= Helen Zerefos =

Australian coloratura soprano (born 1937)

Helen Zerefos OAM
- Born: Helen Zerefos; 8 October 1937; Scone, New South Wales, Australia
- Occupations: Singer; Coloratura soprano
- Years active: 1961–2017

Helen Zerefos OAM (born 8 November 1937) is an Australian coloratura soprano. Her career has spanned more than 56 years on stage, television, in nightclubs, concerts and recordings.

Zerefos was born in Scone, New South Wales to Greek parents, Paul and Katina. Her career was launched in 1961, at a time when musical variety shows were popular on television. She was the first person of Greek heritage to be a regular artist on Australian television.

She was a regular member of the Revue 20 headed by Claire Poole. This was a twenty-piece choral ensemble which provided background choruses for Seven Network variety programs such as Digby Wolfe's Revue '61 and '62, John Laws' Startime and Studio A - hosted firstly by The LeGarde Twins and then by Colin Croft - as well as Curtain Call, a late night variety program hosted by Revue 20 member John Wickham-Hall. She played Tuptim in a professional tent production of The King and I and Marion Paroo in The Music Man in January 1966 at Warringah Mall in Brookvale, New South Wales. She was also engaged to play Maria von Trapp in a later production of The Sound of Music along with June Bronhill (Maria in the original Australian tour of the musical) who was to play the Mother Abbess. The project was scheduled to present six musicals, however only three (The King and I, Annie Get Your Gun and The Music Man) were actually produced. The project was abandoned for lack of both audience support and a dwindling capital base. The remaining musicals (Gypsy, Bye Bye Birdie and The Sound of Music) remained unpresented.

Zerefos was encouraged to pursue a career in America but her marriage in 1971 and strong family ties kept her in Australia.

Zerefos is also a charity worker for the Aging Research Centre at Sydney’s Prince of Wales Hospital. Her father died suddenly in 1981 and her mother soon after began to show signs of Alzheimer's disease. Her mother needed constant attention, so Zerefos became her primary carer and she was soon fund-raising to assist research into this illness. Zerefos' husband, Raymond, died in 2002 after a lengthy, debilitating illness.

Her extravagant costumes earned her the nickname Helen Fairy Floss. She also made a number of LP recordings.

== Awards ==
=== Mo Awards ===
The Australian Entertainment Mo Awards (commonly known informally as the Mo Awards), were annual Australian entertainment industry awards. They recognise achievements in live entertainment in Australia from 1975 to 2016. Helen Zerefos won three awards in that time.

Year	Nominee / work	Award	Result (wins only)
2006	Helen Zerefos	Classical Opera Performer of the Year	Won
2008	Helen Zerefos	John Campbell Fellowship Award	Won
2015	Helen Zerefos	Female Vocal Performer of the Year	Won
