= Ben Gunn =

Ben or Benjamin Gunn may refer to:

- Ben Gunn (campaigner) (born 1965), former prisoner on life licence
- Ben Gunn (Treasure Island), fictional character in Robert Louis Stevenson's Treasure Island
- Ben Gunn, early guitarist with The Sisters of Mercy
- Benjamin B. Gunn (1860–1907), Canadian politician

== See also ==
- Benn Gunn, Australian country performer
- The Adventures of Ben Gunn, a 1956 novel by R. F. Delderfield, written as a prequel to the novel Treasure Island
