= Stephen Fisher-King =

Australia musician

- Born: Canberra, Australian Capital Territory
- Occupation: Musician
- Instrument: vocals
- Years active: 1995–present
- Website: stephenfisher-king.com

Stephen Fisher-King is an Australian musician and entertainer and has performed lead roles in operas including La bohème, The Coronation of Poppea and Dido and Aeneas and Australian productions of Hello Dolly, Evita and Cats and toured Australasia alongside Sarah Brightman in The Music of Andrew Lloyd Webber.

== Early life ==
Stephen was born and grew up in Canberra, Australian Capital Territory and is one of four children. He began singing lessons when he was nine years old.

== Discography ==
=== Albums ===
List of albums with selected details
Title	Details
Reflections	Released: December 2011; Label: Bible Leagure; Format: Digital
Where Do I Begin	Released: 2012; Label: Stephen Fisher-King; Format: Digital
Vocal Treasures	Released: November 2014; Label: Stephen Fisher-King; Format: Digital
Inspiration	Released: 2016; Label: Stephen Fisher-King; Format: Digital
Stephen Fisher-King Sings Songs of the Seventies	Released: 2018; Label: Stephen Fisher-King; Format: Digital

== Awards ==
=== Mo Awards ===
The Australian Entertainment Mo Awards (commonly known informally as the Mo Awards), were annual Australian entertainment industry awards. They recognise achievements in live entertainment in Australia from 1975 to 2016. Fisher-King has won 9 awards in that time.

Year	Nominee / work	Award	Result (wins only)
1995	Stephen Fisher-King	Male Variety Performer of the Year	Won
1996	Stephen Fisher-King	Variety Performer of the Year	Won
1996	Stephen Fisher-King	Male Variety Performer of the Year	Won
1997	Stephen Fisher-King	Variety Performer of the Year	Won
1997	Stephen Fisher-King	Male Variety Performer of the Year	Won
1998	Stephen Fisher-King	Male Variety Performer of the Year	Won
1999	Stephen Fisher-King	Male Variety Performer of the Year	Won
2001	Stephen Fisher-King	Male Variety Performer of the Year	Won
2003	Stephen Fisher-King	Male Variety Performer of the Year	Won
