= Joey Fimmano =

Australia musician

- Occupation: Musician
- Instruments: vocals; piano; accordion
- Years active: 1978–present
- Labels: Message
- Website: www.joeyfimmano.com.au

Joey Fimmano is an Australian musician and entertainer.

== Career ==
Joey Fimmano was just four when his grandfather inspired him to pick up the piano accordion for the first time.

Fimmano's career began in 1978 where he appeared on Young Talent Time. From there, Fimmano went on to be a regular on TV daytime shows during the 1980s and 90s.

Joey now has a show named ‘Music Of The Night’, which tours around Australia ever since 2017. His son, Luca Fimmano, sometimes plays drums in the show.

== Discography ==
=== Albums ===
List of albums with selected details
Title	Details
Presenting Joseph Fimmano	Released: 1979; Label: Message (YPRX-1554); Format: Vinyl, Cassette
There's No Stoppin' Me Now	Released: 1985; Label: Joey Fimmano (JFL001); Format: Vinyl, Cassette
It's Time	Released: 1999; Label: Big Note Music; Format: CD
Music D'Amour	Released: 2015; Label: Joey Fimmano; Format: Digital

== Awards ==
=== Mo Awards ===
The Australian Entertainment Mo Awards (commonly known informally as the Mo Awards), were annual Australian entertainment industry awards. They recognise achievements in live entertainment in Australia from 1975 to 2016. Fimmano won 11 awards in that time.

Year	Nominee / work	Award	Result (wins only)
1994	Joey Fimmano	Vocal/Instrumental Performer of the Year	Won
1995	Joey Fimmano	Vocal/Instrumental Performer of the Year	Won
1996	Joey Fimmano	Vocal/Instrumental Performer of the Year	Won
2006	Joey Fimmano	Instrumental or Vocal Performer of the Year	Won
2007	Joey Fimmano	Instrumental or Vocal Performer of the Year	Won
2008	Joey Fimmano	Instrumental or Vocal Performer of the Year	Won
2012	Joey Fimmano	International Theme Show/Performer of the Year	Won
