= Phil Cass =

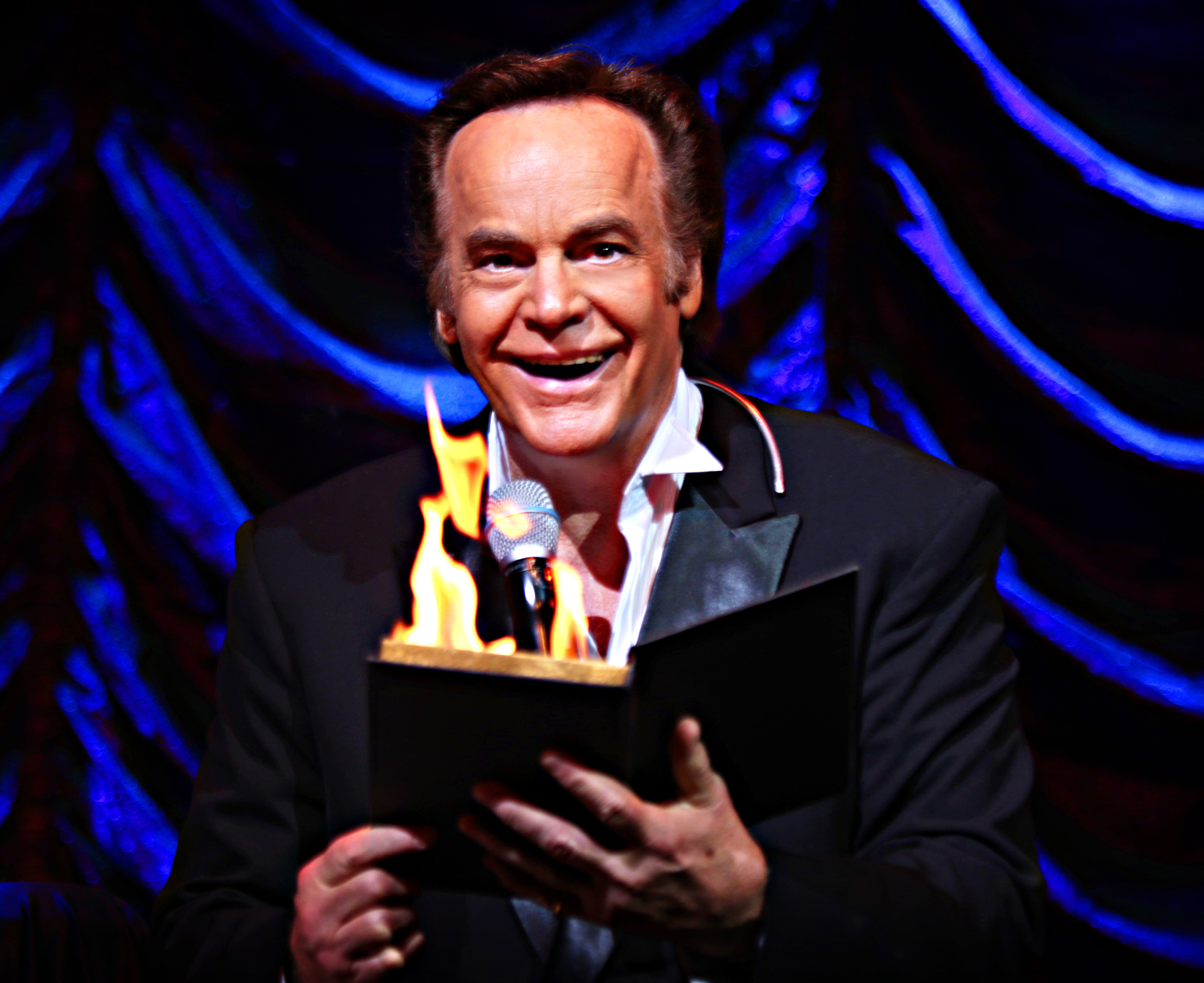
- Born: 2 May 1965 (age 60); Toowoomba, Queensland, Australia
- Citizenship: Australia
- Education: Bachelor of Economics, University of Queensland, 1983
- Occupations: Magician comedian
- Years active: 1983−present
- Notable work: Oh No! Not a Magician!! (1992)
- Website: philcass.com

Phil Cass (born 2 May 1965) is an Australian magician and comedy entertainer. He was the recipient of the Gold MO Award for 2013 Australian Performer of the Year.

== Career ==
Cass is a former rugby league player with Brisbane Souths.

Cass has performed over 5000 shows. He has performed four seasons at Magic Castle in Hollywood, as well as performances in Fiji, Japan, the Philippines, New Zealand, Noumea, Singapore, Hong Kong, Bangkok, Papua New Guinea, World Expo 88, and various club and corporate work throughout Australia.

He is based in Sydney.

== Publications ==
- Oh No! Not a Magician!! (1992)

== DVDs ==
- Phil Cass in Action
- Funniest Comedy Compilation Collector's Set
- The Best of the Footy Show Comedians
- Pea & Shell Game
- Street Shells

== Awards and recognition ==
=== Mo Awards ===
The Australian Entertainment Mo Awards (commonly known as the Mo Awards), were annual Australian entertainment industry awards. They recognise achievements in live entertainment in Australia from 1975 to 2016. Phil Cass won nine awards in that time.

Year	Nominee / work	Award	Result (wins only)
1991	Phil Cass	Specialty Act of the Year	Won
1992	Phil Cass	Specialty Act of the Year	Won
1993	Phil Cass	Specialty Act of the Year	Won
1995	Phil Cass	Versatile Variety Performance of the Year	Won
1996	Phil Cass	Specialty Act of the Year	Won
1997	Phil Cass	Specialty Act of the Year	Won
1998	Phil Cass	Specialty Act of the Year	Won
2013	Phil Cass	Best Specialty Act of the Year	Won
2013	Phil Cass	Peter Allen Performer of the Year	Won

=== Other awards ===
- 8 time Wallace Art Awards including Comedian of the Year and the Entertainer of the Year
- National 'ACE' (Australian Club Entertainment) Awards for Sight Act of the Year (Phil & Philippa) in 1998, 1999, 2000
- 8 time internal 'Best Magician' type awards including a Genii's trophy for his "Outstanding Contribution to Comedy Magic in Australia
