= Michelle Nicolle =

Australian jazz singer

- Origin: Australia
- Genres: Jazz
- Occupation: Singer
- Website: michellenicolle.com

Michelle Nicolle is an Australian jazz singer. She has been nominated for ARIA Awards for Best Jazz Album in 2001 (After The Rain), 2004 (The Crying Game) and in 2009 (The Loveliest Night).

== Discography ==
=== Albums ===
Title	Details
Misterioso	Released: 1998; Label: Michelle Nicolle (MN 24) / New Market Music (NEW3043.2)
After the Rain	Released: May 2001; Label: ABC Jazz (271 0973)
The Crying Game	Released: 2003; Label: ABC Jazz (476 123–0)
Keep Your Heart Right	Released: 2004; Label: Newmarket (NEW3108.2)
What Kind of Fool	Released: 2005; Label: Newmarket (NEW 3201.2)
The Loveliest Night	Released: 2009; Label: ABC Jazz (1799501)
Mancini (as Michelle Nicolle Quartet)	Released: 2012; Label: The Artists Bureau

== Awards and nominations ==
=== ARIA Music Awards ===
The ARIA Music Awards is an annual awards ceremony that recognises excellence, innovation, and achievement across all genres of Australian music. It commenced in 1987.

Year	Nominee / work	Award	Result	Ref.
2001	After the Rain	Best Jazz Album	Nominated	
2004	The Crying Game	Best Jazz Album	Nominated	
2009	The Loveliest Night	Best Jazz Album	Nominated	

=== Mo Awards ===
The Australian Entertainment Mo Awards (commonly known informally as the Mo Awards), were annual Australian entertainment industry awards. They recognise achievements in live entertainment in Australia from 1975 to 2016. Michelle Nicolle won two awards in that time.

Year	Nominee / work	Award	Result (wins only)
2000	Michelle Nicolle	Jazz Vocal Performer of the Year	Won
2002	Michelle Nicolle	Jazz Vocal Performer of the Year	Won

=== Music Victoria Awards ===
The Music Victoria Awards are an annual awards night celebrating Victorian music. They commenced in 2006.

Year	Nominee / work	Award	Result	Ref.
2024	Michelle Nicolle	Best Jazz Work	Won	
