= George Dodd (Australian writer) =

Australian comedy writer

George Dodd is an Australian comedy writer. His list of credits as co-writer includes many popular Australian comedy TV shows from the 1990s up until today, including Good News Week.

He appeared on-screen in Andrew Denton's 1989/1990 comedy series The Money or the Gun, under his own name, playing the part of a supposed expert on various subjects.

== Awards and nominations ==
- AWGIE Awards 2013 – Comedy: Sketch or Light Entertainment – Good News Week
