= Wayne Horsburgh =

Australian country music entertainer (born 1955)

- Born: 11 June 1955 (age 71); Benalla, Victoria
- Genre: Country
- Occupation: Singer

Wayne Horsburgh (born 11 June 1955 in Benalla, Victoria) is an Australian country music singer. He currently lives near Sydney, Australia, and Branson, Missouri, United States.

== Biography ==
Horsburgh's was born in Benalla, Victoria in 1955, being influenced by performers such as Slim Whitman, Frank Ifield, Jim Reeves and Marty Robbins, he also decided on a career in entertainment.

He started a career of his own at the age of 11 when he formed his own dance band in rural Victoria. In 1978, he was asked by Buddy Williams (an Australian pioneer of country music) to tour Australia. By 1979, Horsburgh had moved to Sydney to pursue his musical career.

Horsburgh is noted by fans and critics alike for his smooth voice, excellent falsetto notes, impressive vocal range, yodelling abilities, and his willingness to popularize and maintain a broad range of traditional country music art forms.

Setting his sights even higher, Horsburgh performed for a season in the United Kingdom in 1982 and investigated the US music and entertainment scene in 1984.

In 1989, Horsburgh was introduced to United States' country music audiences when he performed at the Hodag Festival in Rhinelander, Wisconsin. A groundswell of audience appreciation and the establishment of a US-based fan club were among the reasons Horsburgh based himself in Nashville by the mid-'90s for each American summer season.

The year 1997 saw yet another move for Horsburgh - this time a relocation to the live entertainment capital of the USA: Branson, Missouri. In addition to a full tour schedule - predominantly in the Midwest- Horsburgh has represented his home nation at the international music and cultural festival - Silver Dollar City's WorldFest - each spring since 1998.

He continues to entertain on the Australian club circuit during the summer months of the southern hemisphere.

In 2013 Horsburgh was inducted into the Australian Roll of Renown.

== Discography ==
=== Albums ===
Title	Details
Yodelling By Request	Released: 1983; Label:
Sequins & Satins & Buckles & Britches (with Deniese Morrison)	Released: 1984; Label:
I Run Alone (with Desrëe-Ilona Crawford)	Released: 1984; Label: G.O.F.A.A. Records Australia (HMD 009R)
Yodelling for You	Released: 1985; Label: Country City Music (CCE 002)
Now & Then...And Again	Released: 1986; Label: Country City Music (CCE 003)
Where in the World	Released: 1989; Label: Country City Music (CCE 008)
I've Always Wanted to Be a Singing Cowboy	Released: 1991; Label: Rich River Records (WHR 1991)
In Every Stone There's a Diamond	Released: 1992
The Nashville Sessions	Released: 1996
Favourites	Released: 1996
The Old Country Church	Released: 1999; Label:
Favourites Two	Released: 2001
Land of Enchantment	Released: March 2002
Memories & Guitar Strings	Released: September 2002
An Aussie Ozark Christmas with Wayne	Released: 2003
A Salute to Slim Whitman	Released: February 2005
Can You Hear Those Pioneers?	Released: April 2005; Label: Jasmine Records (JASMCD 3572)
Songs of the Islands Volume One	Released: 2005; Label: Jasmine Records (JASCD 425)
I Still Call Australia Home	Released: 2007; Label: ISCAH-RR-2007
Born Free	Released: 2008; Label: RR-2008-BF
A Salute to Marty Robbins	Released: 2010; Label: RR-Marty-2010
Yodels and Love Songs	Released: 2012; Label: RR-Yodels-2012
Roll of Renown	Released: 2013; Label: ROR-2013
40 Cowboy Songs (with Howie Brothers)	Released: 2013; Label: GL-035
22 Gospel Greats	Released: 2013; Label: ROR-2013
Songs of the Islands -Volume 2	Released: 2014; Label: RR-SOTI-2014
Celebrating 40 Years	Released: 2016
22 Yodel Greats	Released: 2017; Label: RR-22YG-2017
Country Songs & Western Swing	Released: 2017; Label: RR-C&W-2017
Reminiscing	Released: 2019; Label: RR-Rem-2019

==== Other singles ====
List of singles as featured artist, with selected chart positions
Title	Year	Peak chart positions
Title	Year	AUS
"The Garden" (as Australia Too)	1985	22

== Awards and honours ==
=== Australian Roll of Renown ===
The Australian Roll of Renown honours Australian and New Zealander musicians who have shaped the music industry by making a significant and lasting contribution to Country Music. It was inaugurated in 1976 and the inductee is announced at the Country Music Awards of Australia in Tamworth in January.

Year	Nominee / work	Award	Result
2013	Wayne Horsburgh	Australian Roll of Renown	inductee

=== Mo Awards ===
The Australian Entertainment Mo Awards (commonly known informally as the Mo Awards), were annual Australian entertainment industry awards. They recognise achievements in live entertainment in Australia from 1975 to 2016. Wayne Horsburgh won eight awards in that time.

Year	Nominee / work	Award	Result (wins only)
1984	Wayne Horsburgh	Male Country Entertainer of the Year	Won
1989	Wayne Horsburgh	Country Entertainer of the Yea	Won
1990	Wayne Horsburgh	Male Country Entertainer of the Yea	Won
1995	Wayne Horsburgh	Male Country Entertainer of the Yea	Won
2007	Wayne Horsburgh	Slim Dusty Country Vocal Performer of the Year	Won
2012	Wayne Horsburgh	Slim Dusty Country Act of the Year	Won
2016	Wayne Horsburgh	Country Solo/ Group or Band of the Year	Won
2016	Wayne Horsburgh	Entertainer of the Year	Won
