= Adam Scicluna =

Australia ventriloquist

Adam Scicluna is an Australian entertainer

== Career ==
Scicluna's career began in the world of Opera with performances at the Sydney Opera House. He has played over 30 lead roles ranging from classics like Tevye in Fiddler on the Roof to modern masterpieces such as God in Children of Eden.

He has played both Javert and Jean Valjean in Les Miserable. He also appeared as The Lion and Cogsworth in Packemin Productions of The Wizard of Oz and Beauty and the Beast at Riverside Theatre.

Se starred as Edward Bloom in the musical adaptation of Big Fish.His musical theatre work also includes cast and workshop recordings under the direction of well-known musical theatre identities Tony Sheldon and Nancye Hayes.

In 1998 he was a backing vocalist for “The Phantom Michael Crawford. His Cabaret “A Lyrical Life” was a sell-out at Riverside Theatre. He has worked in short film, corporate film, TV and Radio and as a guest performer on International Television. In 2008 he was invited to perform for Crown Prince Fredrick and Princess Mary of Denmark.

== Awards ==
=== Mo Awards ===
The Australian Entertainment Mo Awards (commonly known informally as the Mo Awards), were annual Australian entertainment industry awards. They recognise achievements in live entertainment in Australia from 1975 to 2016. Adam Scicluna has won 7 awards.

| Year | Nominee / work | Award | Result (wins only) |
|---|---|---|---|
| 2002 | Adam Scicluna | Johnny O'Keefe Encouragement Award | Won |
| 2004 | Adam Scicluna | Male Vocal Variety Performer of the Year | Won |
| 2007 | Adam Scicluna | Male Performer of the Year | Won |
| 2010 | Adam Scicluna | Male Performer of the Year | Won |
| 2011 | Adam Scicluna | Male Performer of the Year | Won |
| 2011 | Adam Scicluna | Performer of the Year | Won |
| 2012 | Adam Scicluna | Performer of the Year | Won |
