= The Money or the Gun =

1989–1990 Australian comedy TV series

The Money or the Gun is an Australian comedy and talk show on the ABC network. It ran from late 1989 to mid-1990, with occasional specials until 1994. It was written by Andrew Denton (who also hosted it), Simon Dodd, Bruce Griffiths, and George Dodd, directed by Martin Coombes and produced by Mark Fitzgerald. The Canberra Times' reviewer, Mark Wallace described Denton's show, "[it] goes out of its way to take an amusing look at the subject, Denton himself has some ideas which, by their seriousness, are in contrast to those explored on camera."

Each episode was based on a significant theme, with Denton interviewing a number of people as well as conducting vox pops on the street. Significant episodes include "Guns-The Musical" and the award-winning episode on disabilities, "The Year of the Patronising Bastard" (which picked up a United Nations Media Peace Prize). In 1993, a one-off special was called "Topic of Cancer", which talked to teenagers with cancer (while at a CanTeen weekend). In 2003, Denton held a 10-year reunion for the people on the 1993 show, as part of his ABC interview programme Enough Rope.

== "Stairway to Heaven" ==
Each week a guest would perform their own rendition of Led Zeppelin's "Stairway to Heaven". Versions would occasionally tie in with the theme of the episode ("Guns - the Musical" had a Broadway-style version by Jodie Gilles as the conclusion, while the episode on Australian Comedy had the Doug Anthony All Stars performing it with the assistance of Barry Crocker) but the most surprising of all was the interpretation by Rolf Harris which eventually reached number 7 on the UK singles chart. Generally the performance of "Stairway" would be a break in the program and the artists would have no other part in the program.

The audio album, released on CD, Stairways to Heaven (1992) by Various Artists via Triple J Music, won the ARIA Award for Best Comedy Release, in Australia in 1993. It was also nominated for Best Adult Contemporary Album, but lost to Andrew Pendlebury's album, Don't Hold Back That Feeling. Stairways to Heaven was subsequently issued on the Atlantic Label in the USA though truncated.

Performers and styles included:

- Kate Ceberano and The Ministry Of Fun, in a funk style
- John Paul Young, in the style of "Love is in the Air"
- Pardon Me Boys, in a swing style (with numerous references to Glenn Miller songs)
- The Beatnix, a Beatles tribute band, in the style of "I Want to Hold Your Hand", "Please Please Me", and "Twist and Shout"
- Nick Barker & The Reptiles, in a heavy blues style
- Rolf Harris, in the style of "Tie Me Kangaroo Down, Sport"
- The Australian Doors Show, a Doors tribute band, in the style of "When the Music's Over"
- Sandra Hahn, Michael Turkic and the Opera Australia chorus, in the style of an epic Wagner opera
- Robyne Dunn, in the style of "Lucy in the Sky with Diamonds" by The Beatles
- Elvis impersonator Neil Pepper, in the style of "Viva Las Vegas"
- Toots - Jenny Lovell in the flesh, voice by Helen Jones, a femme fatale performance in the style of Jessica Rabbit
- The Whipper Snappers, in an indie rock girl group style
- Friends Of The Castanet Club, as a sea shanty
- Toys Went Berserk, a post-punk version
- Bob Downe, in the style of a lounge singer
- The Rock Lobsters, a B-52's tribute band, in the style of "Rock Lobster"
- Jodie Gillies, in the style of a Broadway musical (with numerous references to "One" from A Chorus Line)
- Etcetera Theatre Company, as a techno dance in the style of Talking Heads
- The Jeff Duff Orchestra, a chamber orchestra with vocals
- Fargone Beauties, as a country thrash in the style of "Dueling Banjos"
- Judi Connelli, as a gospel song
- Barry Crocker and Doug Anthony All Stars in a unique style
- Vegemite Reggae, in a modern reggae/ska style
- The Symphony Chorus of the Sydney Philharmonia Choirs, as an a cappella chorus
- Leonard Teale, as a dramatic poem
- Rory O'Donoghue in the style of an advertising jingle and an Australian ballad

Two compilations of the performances by Various Artists were released in 1992: a video album, The Money or the Gun: Stairways to Heaven, which featured 25 of the 26 performances on VHS via ABC Video/Village Roadshow, and an audio album, Stairways to Heaven, which featured 22 of the 26 performances. An album consisting of 12 tracks was released internationally in 1995.

=== ARIA Music Awards ===
The ARIA Music Awards are a set of annual ceremonies presented by Australian Recording Industry Association (ARIA), which recognise excellence, innovation, and achievement across all genres of the music of Australia. They commenced in 1987.

| Year | Nominee / work | Award | Result | Ref. |
|---|---|---|---|---|
| 1993 | Stairways to Heaven | Best Comedy Release | Won | |
| 1993 | Stairways to Heaven | Best Adult Contemporary Album | Nominated | |

== See also ==
- List of Australian television series
