= Bobby Gebert =

Australian jazz pianist

- Born: John Robert Gebert; 1 April 1944 (age 82); Adelaide, South Australia
- Genre: Jazz

John Robert Gebert (born 1 April 1944, Adelaide) is an Australian jazz pianist. The Bobby Gebert Trio (with Jonathan Zwartz on double bass and Andrew Dickeson on drums) was nominated for the 1995 ARIA Award for Best Jazz Album with The Sculptor.

== Biography ==
John Robert Gebert was born in 1944 in Adelaide. He was trained on piano and studied at London's College of Music before returning to Australia to start his career as a jazz musician. In 1987 he was the pianist for Bernie McGann Quartet for the album, Kindred Spirits, alongside McGann on saxophone, John Pochee on drums and Jonathan Zwartz on double bass.

In 1992 Gebert, Zwartz and Andrew Dickeson on drums backed visiting English saxophonist, Ronnie Scott, for his performances in Australia. Michael Foster of The Canberra Times felt Scott, "was obviously as comfortable with Bobby Gebert's trio as the three Sydney musicians were with him, even on first encounter. This made for a great evening..."

In 1994 Bobby Gebert Trio issued a studio album, The Sculptor, via ABC Music. Foster noticed that Gebert, "can play in many idioms, but is particularly appealing, to me at least, in this mode and mood." He described the tracks, "[it] opens with Gebert's own 'The Sculptor' and he seamlessly blends his own tunes, 'MD. Waltz for Helen' and 'Mo' Blues', with Monk's 'Off Minor', Strayhorn's 'Lotus Blossum', Ellington's 'Reflections in D' and 'Come Sunday', and Hope's 'Something for Kenny'." At the ARIA Music Awards of 1995 it was nominated for Best Jazz Album.

== Discography ==
=== Albums ===
Title	Album details
Kindred Spirits (as Bobby Gebert Quarter)	Released: 1987; Label: Emanem (3602)
The Sculptor (as Bobby Gebert Trio)	Released: 1994; Label: ABC Music (4797574)
The Australia 2000 suite (as Bobby Gebert Trio)	Released: 1997; Label: Australia Council for the Arts

== Awards ==
=== ARIA Music Awards ===
The ARIA Music Awards is an annual awards ceremony that recognises excellence, innovation, and achievement across all genres of Australian music. It commenced in 1987.

Year	Nominee / work	Award	Result
1995	The Sculptor (as Bobby Gebert Trio)	Best Jazz Album	Nominated

=== Mo Awards ===
The Australian Entertainment Mo Awards (commonly known informally as the Mo Awards), were annual Australian entertainment industry awards. They recognise achievements in live entertainment in Australia from 1975 to 2016. Bobby Gebert won two awards in that time.

Year	Nominee / work	Award	Result (wins only)
1993	Bobby Gebert Trio	Jazz Group of the Year	Won
1993	Bobby Gebert	Jazz Performer of the Year	Won
