= Rikki Organ =

Australia entertainer

- Died: 2 August 2016
- Occupations: Musician; Singer
- Instrument: Vocals
- Years active: 1985–2016
- Website: rikkiorgan.com.au

Rikki Organ was an Australian entertainer. He died in 2016 after a seven year battle with cancer. Organ was well known on the Australian club circuit singing favourites by Elvis Presley, Johnny O'Keefe and others. Organ went on to win ten Mo Awards.

== History ==
Rikki left his job as an electrician in Wollongong and found fame after winning Bert Newton's New Faces in the 1980s.

In 2009, Organ was diagnosed with multiple myeloma blood cancer. He died on 2 August 2016 and is survived by his wife Jane and two children, Taylor-Louise and Tyne-James.

== Awards ==
=== Mo Awards ===
The Australian Entertainment Mo Awards (commonly known informally as the Mo Awards), were annual Australian entertainment industry awards. They recognise achievements in live entertainment in Australia from 1975 to 2016. Rikki Organ won ten awards in that time.

Year	Nominee / work	Award	Result (wins only)
1985	Rikki Organ	Johnny O'Keefe Encouragement Award	Won
2004	Rikki Organ	Compere of the Year	Won
2006	Rikki Organ	Compere of the Year	Won
2008	Rikki Organ and the Organ Grinders	Three or More Performer Band of the Year	Won
2009	Rikki Organ and the Organ Grinders	Three or More Performer Band of the Year	Won
2009	Rikki Organ	Compere of the Year	Won
2010	Rikki Organ and the Organ Grinders	Dance Band of the Year	Won
2010	Rikki Organ	Compere of the Year	Won
2011	Rikki Organ and the Organ Grinders	Dance Band of the Year	Won
2012	Rikki Organ and the Organ Grinders	Dance Band of the Year	Won
