= Carter Edwards =

Australian entertainer

Carter Edwards OAM
- Born: Alfred Edward Carter; 3 May 1942
- Died: 10 March 2024 (aged 81); Boolaroo, NSW, Australia
- Occupation: Entertainer
- Children: 4

Carter Edwards OAM (born Alfred Edward Carter) (3 May 1942 - 10 March 2024) was an Australian music legend with an Order of Australia Medal in 2020 for his time in radio presenting and winner of two Mo Awards as "Australia's Most Versatile Entertainer".

Carter began his journey in Perth, where he was unexpectedly entered into the talent show "New Faces," winning the Western Australian heats and earning a spot in the national final.

For nine years, he was known as "the singing painter" in the award-winning "I Did It My Way" television commercials for Taubman's Paints.

Edwards was a prominent figure in radio, hosting the "Carter Edwards Country" program on 2HD in Newcastle for 34 years, starting in 1989. His work in broadcast media, particularly radio, led to him receiving a Medal of the Order of Australia (OAM) in 2020. He was also inducted into the Australian Country Music Broadcasters Hall Of Fame. Edwards retired from radio in 2022.

Edwards also ran as a candidate for Pauline Hanson's One Nation party for the federal division of Dobell in the 2016 Australian federal election. He polled 8,326 votes, equivalent of 8.61% of the primary votes in the electorate.

In March 2024 Carter died at the age of 81.
