= Tony Pantano =

Italian-born Australian musician (1948–2023)

Background information
- Born: January 24, 1948; Messina, Italy
- Died: January 7, 2023 (aged 74) Australia
- Occupation: Musician
- Instrument: Vocals
- Years active: 1965–2023
- Labels: Air label; Image; EMI Music

Tony Pantano (January 20, 1948 – January 7, 2023) was an Italian-born Australian musician, singer, songwriter, and actor.

== Early years and bands ==
Tony Pantano was born in Messina, Italy and arrived in Australia with his parents in 1956.

At the age of 12, Tony worked with his father at local Italian dances and weddings, playing slap bass and singing. At the age of 15 he formed his own pop group Isy and the Dynamics. Isy and the Dynamics recorded the single "One Night/Let Bygones Begone" on the In label in 1965.

Pantano changed his style from pop to Latin American when he joined the group Sammy and The Dolphins as their lead vocalist and bass player. Sammy and The Dolphins released the one extended play titled, The Dolphins At Sergio's Rendezvous, recorded at the Allan Eaton Recording Studios in Melbourne. Following this release, Tony did a tour of Vietnam entertaining the troops. On his return to Australia he entered the talent show Showcase and won his way to the Grand Final.

== Solo career ==
Pantano's first single "Every Time You Touch Me" was released in 1971 on the Air label and reached the Australian top 40.

A second single "Tonight" was released on the His Master's Voice label and peaked at number 80 on the Australian charts.

== Personal life and death ==
Pantano was the grandfather of Australian comedian and Australia's Got Talent semi-finalist JJ Pantano.

On 7 January 2023, it was announced that Pantano had died from cancer, at the age of 74.

== Discography ==
=== Albums ===
List of albums with selected details
Title	Details
Tony Pantano	Released: 1975; Label: Image (ILP749); Format: Vinyl, Cassette
Tonight!	Released: 1976; Label: Image (ILP790); Format: Vinyl, Cassette

=== Charting singles ===
Year	Title	Peak chart positions
Year	Title	AUS
1971	"Every Time You Touch Me"	24
1971	"Tonight"	80

== Awards ==
=== Mo Awards ===
The Australian Entertainment Mo Awards (commonly known informally as the Mo Awards), were annual Australian entertainment industry awards. They recognise achievements in live entertainment in Australia from 1975 to 2016. Pantano won 11 awards in that time.

Year	Nominee / work	Award	Result (wins only)
1975	Tony Pantano	Male Vocal of the Year	Won
1983	Tony Pantano	Male Vocal of the Year	Won
1984	Tony Pantano	Male Vocal Entertainer of the Year	Won
1986	Tony Pantano	Male Vocal Entertainer of the Year	Won
1989	Tony Pantano	Cabaret Performer of the Year	Won
1989	Tony Pantano	Male Vocal Cabaret Entertainer of the Year	Won
1990	Tony Pantano	Cabaret Performer of the Year	Won
2006	Tony Pantano	Ricky May Male Vocal Performer of the Year	Won
2008	Tony Pantano	Ricky May Male Vocal Performer of the Year	Won
2009	Tony Pantano	Ricky May Male Vocal Performer of the Year	Won
2012	Tony Pantano	Ricky May Male Vocal Performer of the Year	Won
