= Fargone Beauties =

- Members: John Spence; James Gillard; Mark Marriot; Terry Murray; Tommy Emmanuel; Mark Collins; Dave Druery; Ian Simpson; Mark Meyer; Doug Bligh Daryl (Jack) Melbourne

Fargone Beauties is an Australian Country music band. Their single "Wild Thing" had national airplay and was on high rotation on many regional radio stations. The played a cover of "Stairway to Heaven" on The Money or the Gun and appeared on the Breaking Ground - New Directions in Country Music compilation which was nominated for a 1991 ARIA Award for Best Country Album. They were nominated for a Golden guitar in 1994 for their song "Single Drop".

== Band members ==
- John Spence - guitar, vocals
- James Gillard - bass, vocals
- Terry Murray - guitar, vocals
- Mark Marriott - drums
- Tommy Emmanuel - drums
- Doug Bligh - drums
- Mark Meyer - drums
- Dave Druery - drums
- Mark Collins - banjo
- Ian Simpson - banjo
- Daryl Melbourne - banjo, dobro

== Discography ==
=== Albums ===
List of albums with selected details
Title	Details	Peak chart positions
Title	Details	AUS
The Fargone Beauties	Released: 1991; Label: True Blue (468528 2); Format: CD	137
It's Hard When You're Ugly	Released: November 1992; Label: Phonogram (514152.2); Format: CD	147
Dark Side of the Moo	Released: 1994; Label: Dino Music (DIN427D); Format: CD	-
A Load of Old Bullocks: The Best of The Fargone Beauties	Released: 2006; Label: The Fargone Beauties; Format: CD	-

== Awards ==
=== Mo Awards ===
The Australian Entertainment Mo Awards (commonly known informally as the Mo Awards), were annual Australian entertainment industry awards. They recognise achievements in live entertainment in Australia from 1975 to 2016. They won 3 awards in that time.

Year	Nominee / work	Award	Result (wins only)
1992	Fargone Beauties	Country Group of the Year	Won
1993	Fargone Beauties	Country Group of the Year	Won
1994	Fargone Beauties	Country Group of the Year	Won
