= Darren Carr (ventriloquist) =

Australia ventriloquist

- Occupation: ventriloquist
- Instruments: ventriloquist; comedian
- Years active: 2001–present
- Website: www.darrencarr.com

Darren Carr is an Australian ventriloquist and comedian.

== Career ==
In 2013, Carr auditioned and made it to the Semi-Final of the season 7 of Australia's Got Talent.

== Awards ==
=== Mo Awards ===
The Australian Entertainment Mo Awards (commonly known informally as the Mo Awards), were annual Australian entertainment industry awards. They recognise achievements in live entertainment in Australia from 1975 to 2016. Darren Carr has won 18 awards.

Year	Nominee / work	Award	Result (wins only)
2001	Darren Carr	Specialty Performer	Won
2003	Darren Carr	Specialty Performer	Won
2004	Darren Carr	Specialty Performer	Won
2006	Darren Carr	Versatile Performer	Won
2006	Darren Carr	Specialty Performer	Won
2007	Darren Carr	Versatile Performer	Won
2007	Darren Carr	Specialty Performer	Won
2007	Darren Carr	Peter Allen Performer of the Year	Won
2008	Darren Carr	Specialty Performer	Won
2008	Darren Carr	Peter Allen Performer of the Year	Won
2009	Darren Carr	Specialty Performer	Won
2010	Darren Carr	Best Specialty Act	Won
2011	Darren Carr	Best Specialty Act	Won
2012	Darren Carr	Best Specialty Act	Won
2014	Darren Carr	Best Specialty Act	Won
2014	Darren Carr	Comedy Act of the Year	Won
2014	Darren Carr	Peter Allen Performer of the Year	Won
2016	Darren Carr	Comedy Act of the Year	Won
