= Mo Awards =

Annual Australian music industry awards

- Awarded for: Achievement in Live Entertainment
- Location: Australia
- First award: 1975
- Final award: 2021

The Australian Entertainment Mo Awards (commonly known as the Mo Awards) were an annual Australian entertainment industry award, established in 1975, to recognise achievements in live entertainment in Australia. They were last awarded in 2021.

Lucky Grills, actor and comedian came up with the idea to create an awards show to celebrate Australian Variety, during a meeting in 1975.

The Mo Awards, initially the Star Awards, were a state honour in New South Wales only, established by local entertainers to promote the live entertainment industry.

Johnny O'Keefe became chairman in 1976, and decided the awards should become an Australia-wide national awards program. Entertainer Don Lane then proposed the awards be renamed the Mo Awards in honour of Australian comedian and vaudevillian Roy Rene, who was famous for the character "Mo McCackie."

== Categories ==
The award categories were reviewed annually and adapted to new trends in the Australian entertainment sector; categories included awards in: musical theatre, opera, classical music, dance, comedy, rock music, jazz, country music, plays and variety shows.

== Award winners ==
The Award winners are listed below.

=== 1975: NSW Star Awards ===
The NSW Star Awards took place on 10 November 1975 at South Sydney Seniors Leagues Club – Redfern. It was compered by Frank Newall.

- AGENT OF THE YEAR: Brian Fogarty
- BEST BALLET: Marrickville RSL (Greg Radford)
- RESIDENT BAND UP TO 4 MEMBERS: Bob Taylor
- RESIDENT BAND 5 OR MORE: Billy Burton
- CLUB OF THE YEAR: Central Coast Leagues Club
- MOST IMPROVED ACT: Llynda Nairn
- ENCOURAGEMENT AWARD: Llynda Nairn
- VOCAL DUO: Bill and Boyd
- VOCAL GROUP: The Four Kinsmen
- INSTRUMENTAL ACT: Mal Cunningham
- SPECIALTY ACT: The Allisons
- VERSATILE VARIETY ACT: Erris and Kevin
- COMEDY ACT: Johnny Pace and Harriet
- COMEDIAN: Slim De Grey
- MALE VOCAL: Tony Pantano
- FEMALE VOCAL: Jenifer Green
- SPECIAL CONTRIBUTION AWARD: John Campbell
- ACT OF THE YEAR: Don Lane and The Four Kinsmen (tie)

=== 1976: 1st Mo Awards ===
The first MO Awards took place on 13 October 1976 at Revesby, New South Wales Revesby Workers Club. It was compered by Don Lane. This year the ceremony was telecast by the Nine Network.

- BEST RESIDENT BAND: Billy Burton Orchestra
- BEST BALLET: Joanne Ansell Dancers
- BEST CLUB: Central Coast Leagues Club
- MOST IMPROVED ACT: Mario D'Andrea
- BEST VOCAL DUO: Bill and Boyd
- BEST VOCAL GROUP: The Four Kinsmen
- BEST SIGHT ACT: Ken Littlewood & Toshi
- BEST INSTRUMENTALIST: The Toppanos
- MOST VERSATILE ACT: Frankie Davidson
- BEST COMEDY ACT: Johnny Pace and Harriet
- COMEDIAN/COMEDIENNE: Slim De Grey
- BEST MALE VOCAL: Barry Crocker
- BEST FEMALE VOCAL: Julie Anthony
- SPECIAL CONTRIBUTION AWARD: Johnny O'Keefe
- ENTERTAINER OF THE YEAR: Barry Crocker

=== 1977: 2nd Mo Awards ===
The second MO Awards took place on 16 November 1977 at Revesby, New South Wales Revesby Workers Club.

- BEST RESIDENT BAND (5 OR LESS): Bob Taylor Quartet
- BEST RESIDENT BAND (6 OR MORE): Billy Burton Orchestra
- BEST RESIDENT or CASUAL BALLET: Joanne Ansell Dancers
- CLUB PROVIDING BEST FACILITIES FOR PRESENTATION OF ENTERTAINMENT: Central Coast Leagues Club
- MOST IMPROVED OR NEW ACT OF THE YEAR: Nairn Goby Duo
- VARIETY PRODUCTION SHOW: Simone and Monique's Playgirls Revue
- VOCAL DUO: Bill and Boyd
- VOCAL GROUP (3 OR MORE): The Four Kinsmen
- BEST SIGHT or SPECIALITY ACT: Ken Littlewood and Toshi & Barry Krause (Tie)
- BEST INSTRUMENTAL ACT: The Toppanos
- MOST VERSATILE ACT: Ross and Robyn
- COMEDY ACT (2 OR MORE): The Rhythmaires
- COMEDIAN/COMEDIENNE: Jan Adele
- MALE VOCAL: Barry Crocker
- FEMALE VOCAL: Julie Anthony
- MO FELLOWSHIP AWARD: Bobby Le Brun
- ENTERTAINER OF THE YEAR: Julie Anthony

=== 1978: 3rd Mo Awards ===
The third MO Awards took place on 14 February 1979 at Revesby, New South Wales Revesby Workers Club. It was compered by Jimmy Hannan.

- BEST RESIDENT BAND (5 OR LESS): Bob Taylor Quartet
- BEST RESIDENT BAND (6 OR MORE): Billy Burton Orchestra
- RESIDENT or CASUAL BALLET: Diane Heaton Dancers
- CLUB PROVIDING BEST FACILITIES & SUPPORTING LOCAL ENTERTAINMENT: Epping RSL Club
- VARIETY PRODUCTION SHOW: Simone and Monique's Playgirls Revue
- INSTRUMENTAL/VOCAL SHOWGROUP: The Fugitives
- VOCAL GROUP (2 OR MORE): The Four Kinsmen
- INSTRUMENTALIST: Mal Cunningham
- SPECIALITY ACT: Steve Bor
- VERSATILE VARIETY ACT: Ross and Robyn
- COMEDY ACT (2 OR MORE): The Rhythmaires
- COMEDIAN/COMEDIENNE: Slim De Grey
- MALE VOCAL: Johnny Farnham
- FEMALE VOCAL: Julie Anthony
- JOHNNY O'KEEFE ENCOURAGEMENT AWARD: Keith Scott
- ENTERTAINER OF THE YEAR: Julie Anthony

=== 1979: 4th Mo Awards ===
The fourth MO Awards took place on 13 February 1980 at Revesby Workers Club. It was compered by Barry Crocker.

- ACCOMPANYING BAND (5 OR LESS): Bob Taylor Quintet & Jack Thorpe's Showband (tie)
- ACCOMPANYING BAND (6 OR MORE): Sounds United
- RESIDENT or CASUAL BALLET: Diane Heaton Dancers
- CLUB PROVIDING BEST FACILITIES & SUPPORTING LOCAL ENTERTAINMENT: Epping RSL Club
- COUNTRY SHOWGROUP: Men of Country
- COUNTRY MALE ENTERTAINER: Johnny Ashcroft
- COUNTRY FEMALE ENTERTAINER: Allison Durbin
- VARIETY PRODUCTION SHOW: Simone and Monique's Playgirls Revue
- VOCAL GROUP: The Flanagans
- INSTRUMENTAL/VOCAL SHOWGROUP: The Fugitives
- INSTRUMENTALIST: Mal Cunningham
- SPECIALITY ACT: Steve Bor
- VERSATILE VARIETY ACT: Carter Edwards
- COMEDY ACT (2 OR MORE): The Rhythmaires
- COMEDIAN/COMEDIENNE: Brian Doyle
- MALE VOCAL: John Farnham
- FEMALE VOCAL: Kirri Adams
- JOHN CAMPBELL FELLOWSHIP AWARD: Jack Griffiths
- DAILY TELEGRAPH READERS AWARD: Don Lane
- JOHNNY O'KEEFE ENCOURAGEMENT AWARD: Family Affair
- ENTERTAINER OF THE YEAR: Ricky May

=== 5th Mo Awards ===
Technically, there was no 5th awards. Following the 1979 awards in 1980, the organisation updated the numbering to reflect the 1975 Star Awards were the 1st, thus renumbering following ceremonies.

=== 1980: 6th Mo Awards ===
The sixth MO Awards took place on 23 February 1981 at Regent Theatre (Sydney). It was compered by Barry Crocker.

- ACCOMPANYING BAND (5 OR LESS): Bob Taylor Quintet
- ACCOMPANYING BAND (6 OR MORE): Sound Unlimited
- RESIDENT or CASUAL BALLET: Diane Heaton Dancers (Epping RSL Club Troupe)
- RESIDENT COMPERE: Jeff Parker
- CLUB OF THE YEAR: Rooty Hill RSL Club
- COUNTRY GROUP: Roadapple
- COUNTRY MALE: Greg Anderson
- COUNTRY FEMALE: Allison Durbin
- VARIETY PRODUCTION SHOW: Toppano Family Show
- SHOWGROUP: The Fugitives
- VOCAL GROUP: Family Affair
- VOCAL DUO: Bill and Boyd
- INSTRUMENTALIST (SOLO or DUO): Mal Cunningham
- VOCAL/INSTRUMENTAL (SOLO or DUO): Greg Bonham
- SPECIALTY ACT: Steve Bor
- VERSATILE VARIETY ACT: Ross and Robyn
- COMEDY ACT (2 OR MORE): The Rhythmaires
- COMEDIAN/COMEDIENNE: Brian Doyle
- MALE VOCAL: John Farnham
- FEMALE VOCAL: Julie Anthony
- JOHN CAMPBELL FELLOWSHIP AWARD: Col Joye
- DAILY TELEGRAPH READERS AWARD: Don Lane
- JOHNNY O'KEEFE ENCOURAGEMENT AWARD: Simon Gallaher
- ENTERTAINER OF THE YEAR: John Farnham

=== 1981: 7th Mo Awards ===
The seventh MO Awards took place on 17 March 1982 at Bankstown Town Hall. It was compered by Toni Stevens & Steve Raymond

- ACCOMPANYING BAND (5 OR LESS): Dave Bridge Band
- ACCOMPANYING BAND (6 OR MORE): Norm Faber Orchestra
- RESIDENT or CASUAL BALLET: Diane Heaton Dancers
- RESIDENT COMPERE: Rickie Hilder
- CLUB OF THE YEAR: Rooty Hill RSL Club
- COUNTRY GROUP: Men Of Country
- COUNTRY MALE: Greg Anderson
- COUNTRY FEMALE: Judy Stone
- VARIETY PRODUCTION SHOW: Simone and Monique's Playgirls Revue
- VOCAL GROUP: The Four Kinsmen
- VOCAL DUO: Bill and Boyd
- INSTRUMENTAL/VOCAL SHOWGROUP: Daly Wilson Big Band
- INSTRUMENTALIST (SOLO or DUO): Peta Lowe
- VOCAL/INSTRUMENTAL (SOLO or DUO): Simon Gallaher
- SPECIALITY ACT: Steve Bor
- VERSATILE VARIETY: Carter Edwards
- COMEDY ACT (2 OR MORE): The Rhythmaires
- COMEDIAN/COMEDIENNE: Johnny Garfield
- MALE VOCAL: John Farnham
- FEMALE VOCAL: Lynn Rogers
- JOHN CAMPBELL FELLOWSHIP AWARD: Jenny Howard
- DAILY TELEGRAPH READERS AWARD: Don Lane
- JOHNNY O'KEEFE ENCOURAGEMENT AWARD: Jackie Love
- ENTERTAINER OF THE YEAR: Barry Crocker

=== 1982: 8th Mo Awards ===
The eighth MO Awards took place on 16 March 1983 at Regent Theatre (Sydney). It was compered by Barry Crocker

- ACCOMPANYING BAND (5 OR LESS): Dave Bridge Band
- ACCOMPANYING BAND (6 OR MORE): Impax
- RESIDENT or CASUAL BALLET: Diane Heaton Dancers
- RESIDENT COMPERE: Jeff Parker
- VENUE OF THE YEAR: Bankstown Sports Club
- COUNTRY SHOWGROUP: Buckskin
- COUNTRY MALE: Digby Richards
- COUNTRY FEMALE: Judy Stone
- VARIETY PRODUCTION SHOW: Jan Adele and Lucky Grills – Fun Follies
- SHOWGROUP: Daly Wilson Big Band
- VOCAL GROUP: The Delltones
- VOCAL DUO: Bill and Boyd
- INSTRUMENTALIST (SOLO or DUO): Peta Lowe
- VOCAL/INSTRUMENTAL ACT: Simon Gallaher
- SPECIALITY ACT: Steve Bor
- VERSATILE VARIETY ACT: Marty Morton
- COMEDY ACT (2 OR MORE): The Rhythmaires
- COMEDIAN/COMEDIENNE: Paul Martell
- MALE VOCAL: John Farnham
- FEMALE VOCAL: Julie Anthony
- JOHN CAMPBELL FELLOWSHIP AWARD: Dorothy Barry
- DAILY TELEGRAPH READERS AWARD: Kamahl
- JOHNNY O'KEEFE ENCOURAGEMENT AWARD: Karen Beckett
- ENTERTAINER OF THE YEAR: Julie Anthony

=== 1983: 9th Mo Awards ===
The ninth MO Awards took place on 21 March 1984 at Sydney Town Hall.

- ACCOMPANYING BAND (5 OR LESS): Bob Taylor Quintet
- ACCOMPANYING BAND (6 OR MORE): Impax
- RESIDENT or CASUAL BALLET: Diane Heaton Dancers
- RESIDENT COMPERE: Rickie Hilder
- VENUE OF THE YEAR: Rooty Hill RSL Club
- COUNTRY SHOWGROUP: The Bushwackers
- COUNTRY MALE: Greg Anderson
- COUNTRY FEMALE: Judy Stone
- PRODUCTION SHOW: Eddie Youngblood's "Golden Years of Elvis"
- VOCAL GROUP: The Delltones
- VOCAL DUO: Bill and Boyd
- INSTRUMENTAL/VOCAL SHOWGROUP: Wickety Wak Showband
- INSTRUMENTALIST (SOLO OR DUO): Peta Lowe
- SPECIALITY ACT: Ken Littlewood and Toshi
- VOCAL/INSTRUMENTAL ACT: Mary Schneider
- VERSATILE VARIETY: Marty Morton
- COMEDY ACT (2 OR MORE): Thomas and Moore
- COMEDIAN/COMEDIENNE: Paul Martell
- MALE VOCAL: Tony Pantano
- FEMALE VOCAL: Jackie Love
- INTERNATIONAL ACT OF THE YEAR: Peter Allen
- JOHN CAMPBELL FELLOWSHIP AWARD: Buster Noble
- DAILY TELEGRAPH READERS AWARD: Kamahl
- JOHNNY O'KEEFE ENCOURAGEMENT AWARD: Jenny Andrews & Tina Cross (tie)
- ENTERTAINER OF THE YEAR: Jon English

=== 1984: 10th Mo Awards ===
The tenth MO Awards took place on 1 May 1985 at the Sydney Opera House.

- ACCOMPANYING BAND (5 OR LESS): Dave Bridge Band
- ACCOMPANYING BAND (6 OR MORE): Impax - Fairfield RSL Club
- RESIDENT or CASUAL BALLET: Diane Heaton Dancers
- RESIDENT COMPERE: Jeff Parker
- VENUE OF THE YEAR: Seagulls Rugby League Football Club
- COUNTRY SHOWGROUP: Redgum
- MALE COUNTRY ENTERTAINER: Wayne Horsburgh
- FEMALE COUNTRY ENTERTAINER: Judy Stone
- PRODUCTION SHOW: Eddie Youngblood's "Golden Years of Elvis"
- INSTRUMENTAL/VOCAL SHOWGROUP: Wickety Wak Showband
- VOCAL GROUP (3 OR MORE): The Ritz Company
- VOCAL DUO: Bill and Boyd
- INSTRUMENTALIST: Martin Lass
- VOCAL/INSTRUMENTAL ACT: Mary Schneider
- SPECIALITY ACT: Ken Littlewood and Toshi
- VERSATILE VARIETY ACT: David Gilchrist
- COMEDY ACT (2 OR MORE): Gallagher and Brown
- COMEDIAN/COMEDIENNE: Paul Martell
- SPECIAL CONTRIBUTION AWARDS: Paul Flanagan & Robyn Selwyn
- MALE VOCAL ENTERTAINER: Tony Pantano
- FEMALE VOCAL ENTERTAINER: Lynn Rogers
- INTERNATIONAL ACT OF THE YEAR: Peter Allen
- JOHN CAMPBELL FELLOWSHIP AWARD: Tommy Tycho
- DAILY TELEGRAPH READERS AWARD: Kamahl
- JOHNNY O'KEEFE ENCOURAGEMENT AWARD: Donna Lee
- ENTERTAINER OF THE YEAR: Jon English

=== 1985: 11th Mo Awards ===
The eleventh MO Awards took place on 30 April 1986 at the South Sydney Junior Leagues Club. The show was directed by Ian Tasker.

- ACCOMPANYING BAND (4 OR LESS): Trojans
- ACCOMPANYING BAND (5 OR MORE): Impax - Fairfield RSL Club
- RESIDENT or CASUAL BALLET: Michelle Day Dancers
- RESIDENT COMPERE: Rickie Hilder
- VENUE OF THE YEAR: Rooty Hill RSL Club
- COUNTRY SHOWGROUP: Grand Junction
- MALE COUNTRY ENTERTAINER: Slim Dusty
- FEMALE COUNTRY ENTERTAINER: Judy Stone
- PRODUCTION SHOW: The Fifty's
- ROCK GROUP: Little River Band
- SHOWGROUP: The Delltones
- VOCAL GROUP (2 OR MORE): The Four Kinsmen
- INSTRUMENTALIST: Martin Lass
- VOCAL/INSTRUMENTAL ACT: Mary Schneider
- SPECIALITY ACT: Max Gillies
- VERSATILE VARIETY ACT: Donna Lee
- COMEDY ACT: Rodney Rude
- MALE VOCAL ENTERTAINER: Jon English
- FEMALE VOCAL ENTERTAINER: Debbie Byrne
- JOHN CAMPBELL FELLOWSHIP AWARD: Billy Kearns
- JOHNNY O'KEEFE ENCOURAGEMENT AWARD: Rikki Organ
- ENTERTAINER OF THE YEAR: Jon English

=== 1986: 12th Mo Awards ===
The twelfth MO Awards took place on 25 March 1987 at Bankstown Sports Club. The show was directed by Bruce Henries.

- ACCOMPANYING BAND (4 OR LESS): Trojans
- ACCOMPANYING BAND (5 OR MORE): Woomera – Mt Pritchard Community Club
- RESIDENT or CASUAL BALLET: Dianne Heaton Dancers
- RESIDENT COMPERE: Rickie Hilder
- VENUE OF THE YEAR: Petersham RSL Club
- COUNTRY SHOWGROUP: The Bushwackers
- MALE COUNTRY ENTERTAINER: John Williamson
- FEMALE COUNTRY ENTERTAINER: Judy Stone
- ROCK GROUP: INXS
- PRODUCTION SHOW: The Fifty's
- SHOWGROUP: Wickety Wak
- VOCAL GROUP (2 OR MORE): The Four Kinsmen
- INSTRUMENTALIST: Martin Lass
- VOCAL/INSTRUMENTAL ACT: Mary Schneider
- SPECIALITY ACT: Marty Coffee
- VERSATILE VARIETY ACT: Marty Morton
- COMEDY ACT: Paul Martell
- DAILY TELEGRAPH READERS AWARD – GROUP: The Four Kinsmen
- DAILY TELEGRAPH READERS AWARD – FEMALE: Jackie Love
- DAILY TELEGRAPH READERS AWARD – MALE: John Farnham
- MALE VOCAL ENTERTAINER: Tony Pantano
- FEMALE VOCAL ENTERTAINER: Jackie Love & Julie Anthony
- JOHNNY O'KEEFE ENCOURAGEMENT AWARD: Dannielle Gaha
- ENTERTAINER OF THE YEAR: John Farnham

=== 1987: 13th Mo Awards ===
The thirteenth MO Awards took place on 13 April 1988 at Rooty Hill RSL Club.

- ACCOMPANYING BAND (4 OR LESS): Trojans
- ACCOMPANYING BAND (5 OR MORE): Woomera – Mt Pritchard Community Club
- RESIDENT or CASUAL BALLET: Dianne Heaton Dancers
- RESIDENT COMPERE: Rickie Hilder
- VENUE OF THE YEAR: Petersham RSL Club
- COUNTRY SHOWGROUP: Redgum
- MALE COUNTRY ENTERTAINER: John Williamson
- FEMALE COUNTRY ENTERTAINER: Judy Stone
- ROCK GROUP: Icehouse
- PRODUCTION SHOW: The Fifty's
- VOCAL GROUP (2 OR MORE): The Four Kinsmen
- INSTRUMENTALIST: Martin Lass
- VOCAL/INSTRUMENTAL ACT: Mary Schneider
- SPECIALITY ACT: Ken Littlewood & Toshi
- MOST OUTSTANDING VARIETY ACT: Wickety Wak
- VERSATILE VARIETY ACT: Mark Loyd with Pleasure
- COMEDY ACT: Brian Doyle
- DAILY TELEGRAPH READERS AWARD – GROUP: Sophisticated Country
- DAILY TELEGRAPH READERS AWARD – FEMALE: Jane Scali
- DAILY TELEGRAPH READERS AWARD – MALE: John Farnham
- MALE VOCAL ENTERTAINER: John Farnham
- FEMALE VOCAL ENTERTAINER: Jackie Love
- JOHN CAMPBELL FELLOWSHIP AWARD: Doug Burgess
- JOHNNY O'KEEFE ENCOURAGEMENT AWARD: Syd Heylen Jnr
- ENTERTAINER OF THE YEAR: John Farnham

=== 1988: 14th Mo Awards ===
The fourteenth MO Awards took place on 22 February 1989 at AJC Royal Randwick. It was compered by Kerri-Anne Kennerley.

- ACCOMPANYING BAND: Trojans
- CHOREOGRAPHER OF THE YEAR: Ross Coleman
- VENUE OF THE YEAR: Petersham RSL Club
- COUNTRY SHOWGROUP: The Bushwackers
- MALE COUNTRY ENTERTAINER: John Williamson
- FEMALE COUNTRY ENTERTAINER: Judy Stone
- ROCK GROUP: INXS
- MUSICAL THEATRE PERFORMER FEMALE: Geraldine Turner and Debra Byrne (tie)
- MUSICAL THEATRE PERFORMER MALE: Philip Quast
- JAZZ PERFORMER OF THE YEAR: James Morrison
- PRODUCTION SHOW: The Fifty's
- VOCAL GROUP (2 OR MORE): The Rhythmaires
- BEST GROUP: The Four Kinsmen
- INSTRUMENTALIST/VOCAL/INSTRUMENTAL ACT: Martin Lass
- SPECIALITY ACT: The Allisons (Rick & Debbie)
- VERSATILE VARIETY ACT: David Gilchrist and Mark Loyd with Pleasure
- COMEDY ACT: Thomas & Moore
- DAILY TELEGRAPH READERS AWARD – GROUP: Sophisticated Country
- DAILY TELEGRAPH READERS AWARD – FEMALE: Julie Anthony
- DAILY TELEGRAPH READERS AWARD – MALE: John Farnham
- MALE VOCAL ENTERTAINER: John Farnham
- FEMALE VOCAL ENTERTAINER: Julie Anthony
- MOST OUTSTANDING CLUB ACT: Col Joye
- AUSTRALIAN SHOWBUSINESS AMBASSADOR – Paul Hogan
- JOHN CAMPBELL FELLOWSHIP AWARD: Ricky May
- JOHNNY O'KEEFE ENCOURAGEMENT AWARD: Tête à Tête
- ENTERTAINER OF THE YEAR: Ricky May

=== 1989: 15th Mo Awards ===
The fifteenth MO Awards took place on 21 February 1990 at AJC Royal Randwick. It was compered by Ray Martin.

- ACCOMPANYING BAND: Trojans
- COMPERE OF THE YEAR: Norm Erskine
- VENUE OF THE YEAR: Blacktown Workers Club
- CIRCUS PERFORMER OF THE YEAR: The Flying Fruit Fly Circus
- CLASSICAL PERFORMANCE OF THE YEAR: Sydney Symphony Orchestra
- CONTEMPORARY CONCERT PERFORMER OF THE YEAR: Kate Ceberano
- DANCE PERFORMANCE OF THE YEAR: Sydney Dance Company
- OPERATIC PERFORMANCE OF THE YEAR: Robert Gard
- FOLK PERFORMER OF THE YEAR:Judy Small
- COUNTRY SHOWGROUP: The Happening Thang
- MALE COUNTRY ENTERTAINER: James Blundell
- FEMALE COUNTRY ENTERTAINER: Deniese Morrison
- COUNTRY PERFORMER OF THE YEAR: Wayne Horsburgh
- ROCK PERFORMER MALE: Paul Kelly
- ROCK PERFORMER FEMALE: Kate Ceberano
- ROCK GROUP: Paul Kelly and the Messengers
- ROCK PERFORMER OF THE YEAR: Kate Ceberano
- MUSICAL THEATRE PRODUCTION: 42nd Street
- SUPPORTING MUSICAL THEATRE PERFORMER FEMALE: Toni Lamond
- SUPPORTING MUSICAL THEATRE PERFORMER MALE: John Bell
- MUSICAL THEATRE PERFORMER FEMALE: Debra Byrne
- MUSICAL THEATRE PERFORMER MALE: Cameron Daddo
- JAZZ PERFORMER OF THE YEAR MALE: James Morrison
- JAZZ PERFORMER OF THE YEAR FEMALE: Kerrie Biddell
- JAZZ GROUP: Ten Part Invention
- JAZZ PERFORMER OF THE YEAR: James Morrison
- CABARET PRODUCTION SHOW: The Fifty's
- CABARET DUO/TRIO: Triple Treat
- CABARET GROUP: The Four Kinsmen
- INSTRUMENTALIST/VOCAL/INSTRUMENTAL ACT: Martin Lass
- SPECIALITY ACT: The Allisons
- VERSATILE CABARET PERFORMANCE: Mark Loyd with Pleasure
- COMEDY GROUP: Wickety Wak
- COMEDY PERFORMER MALE: Bobby Dennis
- COMEDY PERFORMER FEMALE: Geraldine Doyle
- MALE VOCAL CABARET ENTERTAINER: Tony Pantano
- FEMALE VOCAL CABARET ENTERTAINER: Jackie Love
- CABARET PERFORMER OF THE YEAR: Tony Pantano
- AUSTRALIAN SHOWBUSINESS AMBASSADOR: Kylie Minogue
- JOHN CAMPBELL FELLOWSHIP AWARD: Maurie Rooklyn
- JOHNNY O'KEEFE ENCOURAGEMENT AWARD: Mark Kristian
- AUSTRALIAN PERFORMER OF THE YEAR: James Morrison

=== 1990: 16th Mo Awards ===
The sixteenth MO Awards took place on 17 February 1991 at State Theatre (Sydney). It was compered by Ray Martin, Maggie Kirkpatrick, Brian Doyle and Steve Vizard.

- ACCOMPANYING BAND: Trojans
- COMPERE OF THE YEAR: Rickie Hilder
- VENUE OF THE YEAR: Petersham RSL
- CIRCUS PERFORMER OF THE YEAR: Circus Oz
- CLASSICAL PERFORMANCE OF THE YEAR: Stuart Challender
- CONTEMPORARY CONCERT PERFORMER OF THE YEAR: John Farnham
- DANCE PERFORMANCE OF THE YEAR: Sydney Dance Company - King Roger
- OPERATIC PERFORMANCE OF THE YEAR: Australian Opera – La boheme
- FOLK PERFORMER OF THE YEAR: Eric Bogle
- COUNTRY SHOWGROUP: The Happening Thang
- MALE COUNTRY ENTERTAINER: Wayne Horsburgh
- FEMALE COUNTRY ENTERTAINER: Jean Stafford
- COUNTRY PERFORMER OF THE YEAR: James Morrison
- ROCK PERFORMER MALE: Joe Camilleri
- ROCK PERFORMER FEMALE: Wendy Matthews
- ROCK GROUP: Midnight Oil
- ROCK PERFORMER OF THE YEAR: Midnight Oil
- MUSICAL THEATRE PRODUCTION: The Phantom of the Opera
- SUPPORTING MUSICAL THEATRE PERFORMER FEMALE: Christa Leahman
- SUPPORTING MUSICAL THEATRE PERFORMER MALE: Jonathan Biggins
- MUSICAL THEATRE PERFORMER FEMALE: Marina Prior
- MUSICAL THEATRE PERFORMER MALE: Anthony Warlow
- MUSICAL THEATRE PERFORMER OF THE YEAR: Anthony Warlow
- JAZZ PERFORMER OF THE YEAR MALE: James Morrison
- JAZZ PERFORMER OF THE YEAR FEMALE: Kate Ceberano
- JAZZ GROUP: Mike Nock Quartet
- JAZZ PERFORMER OF THE YEAR: James Morrison
- CABARET PRODUCTION SHOW: Greg Anderson's Electric Spectacular
- CABARET DUO/TRIO: Mark Loyd With Pleasure
- CABARET GROUP: Black Tie
- INSTRUMENTAL ACT: Martin Lass
- SPECIALITY ACT: Leaping Loonies
- VERSATILE CABARET PERFORMANCE: Tony Field and Flame
- COMEDY GROUP: Lester and Smart
- COMEDY PERFORMER MALE: Brian Doyle
- COMEDY PERFORMER FEMALE: Geraldine Doyle
- MALE VOCAL CABARET PERFORMER: Tony Pantano
- FEMALE VOCAL CABARET PERFORMER: Jane Scali
- CABARET PERFORMER OF THE YEAR: Tony Pantano
- AUSTRALIAN SHOWBUSINESS AMBASSADOR: Dame Joan Sutherland
- JOHN CAMPBELL FELLOWSHIP AWARD: Norman Kermond
- JOHNNY O'KEEFE ENCOURAGEMENT AWARD: John Bowles
- AUSTRALIAN PERFORMER OF THE YEAR: Dame Joan Sutherland

=== 1991: 17th Mo Awards ===
The seventeenth MO Awards took place on 4 June 1992 at Sydney Convention and Exhibition Centre. It was compered by Geraldine Doyle, Terry Willesee and Larry Emdur.

- 1 & 2 MAN BAND: Bill and Boyd
- ACCOMPANYING BAND: Trojans
- RESIDENT TECHNICAL SUPPORT: Damon Hartley
- COMPERE OF THE YEAR: Stephen 'Spud' Murphy
- VENUE OF THE YEAR: Petersham RSL
- CLASSICAL PERFORMANCE OF THE YEAR: Stuart Challender
- DANCE PERFORMANCE OF THE YEAR: Miranda Coney and Greg Horsman
- OPERATIC PERFORMANCE OF THE YEAR: OperaAustralia - Rigoletto
- FOLK PERFORMER OF THE YEAR: Archie Roach
- COUNTRY SHOWGROUP: The Happening Thang
- MALE COUNTRY ENTERTAINER: John Williamson
- FEMALE COUNTRY ENTERTAINER: Anne Kirkpatrick
- COUNTRY PERFORMER OF THE YEAR: John Williamson
- ROCK PERFORMER OF THE YEAR: Crowded House
- MUSICAL THEATRE PRODUCTION: The Phantom of the Opera
- SUPPORTING MUSICAL THEATRE PERFORMER FEMALE: Maria Mercedes
- SUPPORTING MUSICAL THEATRE PERFORMER MALE: William Zappa
- MUSICAL THEATRE PERFORMER FEMALE: Judi Connelli
- MUSICAL THEATRE PERFORMER MALE: Anthony Warlow
- MUSICAL THEATRE PERFORMER OF THE YEAR: Anthony Warlow
- OUTSTANDING CONTRIBUTION TO MUSICAL THEATRE: David Atkins
- JAZZ PERFORMER OF THE YEAR MALE: Dale Barlow
- JAZZ PERFORMER OF THE YEAR FEMALE: Judy Bailey
- JAZZ GROUP: Free Spirits
- JAZZ PERFORMER OF THE YEAR: Dale Barlow
- VARIETY PRODUCTION SHOW: Licensed to Thrill
- VARIETY DUO/TRIO: Tony Field and Flame
- VARIETY GROUP: The Four Kinsmen
- INSTRUMENTAL ACT: Wayne King
- SPECIALITY ACT: Phil Cass
- VERSATILE VARIETY PERFORMANCE: David Gilchrist
- COMEDY GROUP: Thomas and Moore
- COMEDY PERFORMER MALE: Brian Doyle
- COMEDY PERFORMER FEMALE: Geraldine Doyle
- COMEDY PERFORMER OF THE YEAR: Paul Martell
- MALE VOCAL VARIETY PERFORMER: Tony Pantano
- FEMALE VOCAL VARIETY PERFORMER: Jane Scali
- VARIETY PERFORMER OF THE YEAR: The Four Kinsmen
- AUSTRALIAN SHOWBUSINESS AMBASSADOR: Jason Donovan
- JOHN CAMPBELL FELLOWSHIP AWARD: June Evans
- MOST SUCCESS ATTRACTION OF THE YEAR: John Williamson
- JOHNNY O'KEEFE ENCOURAGEMENT AWARD: Jenni and Michael
- AUSTRALIAN PERFORMER OF THE YEAR: Stuart Challender

=== 1992: 18th Mo Awards ===
The eighteenth MO Awards took place on 9 June 1993 at Sydney Convention and Exhibition Centre. It was compered by David Reyne and Marty Rhone.

- 1 & 2 MAN BAND: Take Two
- ACCOMPANYING BAND: Trojans
- RESIDENT TECHNICAL SUPPORT: Damon Hartley
- COMPERE OF THE YEAR: Frank Garaty
- VENUE OF THE YEAR: Petersham RSL
- CLASSICAL PERFORMANCE OF THE YEAR: Richard Tognetti
- DANCE PERFORMANCE OF THE YEAR: Paul Mercurio
- OPERATIC PERFORMANCE OF THE YEAR: Suzanne Johnston
- FOLK PERFORMER OF THE YEAR: Archie Roach
- COUNTRY GROUP: The Fargone Beauties
- MALE COUNTRY ENTERTAINER: Lee Kernaghan
- FEMALE COUNTRY ENTERTAINER: Anne Kirkpatrick
- COUNTRY PERFORMER OF THE YEAR: Lee Kernaghan
- ROCK PERFORMER OF THE YEAR: Yothu Yindi
- MUSICAL THEATRE PRODUCTION: The Phantom of the Opera
- SUPPORTING MUSICAL THEATRE PERFORMER FEMALE: Nancye Hayes
- SUPPORTING MUSICAL THEATRE PERFORMER MALE: Peter Carroll
- MUSICAL THEATRE PERFORMER FEMALE: Delia Hannah
- MUSICAL THEATRE PERFORMER MALE: David Atkins
- MUSICAL THEATRE PERFORMER OF THE YEAR: David Atkins
- OUTSTANDING CONTRIBUTION TO MUSICAL THEATRE: Gale Edwards
- JAZZ PERFORMER OF THE YEAR MALE: Dale Barlow
- JAZZ PERFORMER OF THE YEAR FEMALE: Sandy Evans
- JAZZ GROUP: Bernie McGann Trio
- JAZZ PERFORMER OF THE YEAR: Bob Barnard
- VARIETY PRODUCTION SHOW: Licensed to Thrill
- VARIETY DUO/TRIO: Mark Loyd With Pleasure
- VARIETY GROUP: The Four Kinsmen
- INSTRUMENTAL ACT: James Edward
- SPECIALITY ACT: Phil Cass
- VERSATILE VARIETY PERFORMANCE: Peter Kaye
- COMEDY GROUP: Thomas and Moore
- COMEDY PERFORMER MALE: Paul Martell
- COMEDY PERFORMER FEMALE: Wendy Harmer
- COMEDY PERFORMER OF THE YEAR: Paul Martell
- MALE VOCAL VARIETY PERFORMER: Tony Pantano
- FEMALE VOCAL VARIETY PERFORMER: Jane Scali
- VARIETY PERFORMER OF THE YEAR: The Four Kinsmen
- AUSTRALIAN SHOWBUSINESS AMBASSADOR: Yothu Yindi
- JOHN CAMPBELL FELLOWSHIP AWARD: Don Burrows
- MOST SUCCESS ATTRACTION OF THE YEAR: John Williamson
- JOHNNY O'KEEFE ENCOURAGEMENT AWARD: The 4 Trax
- AUSTRALIAN PERFORMER OF THE YEAR: Yothu Yindi

=== 1993: 19th Mo Awards ===
The nineteenth MO Awards took place on 14 June 1994 at Her Majesty's Theatre, Sydney It was compered by John Mangos.

- 1 & 2 MAN BAND: Twin Set
- ACCOMPANYING BAND: The Lionel Huntington Orchestra
- RESIDENT TECHNICAL SUPPORT: John Adams
- COMPERE OF THE YEAR: Dee Donovan
- VENUE OF THE YEAR: Blacktown Workers Club
- CLASSICAL PERFORMANCE OF THE YEAR: Richard Tognetti
- DANCE PERFORMANCE OF THE YEAR: Stephen Page
- OPERATIC PERFORMANCE OF THE YEAR: David Hobson
- FOLK PERFORMER OF THE YEAR: Kev Carmody
- COUNTRY GROUP: Fargone Beauties
- MALE COUNTRY ENTERTAINER: Lee Kernaghan
- FEMALE COUNTRY ENTERTAINER: Gina Jeffreys
- COUNTRY PERFORMER OF THE YEAR: Lee Kernaghan
- ROCK PERFORMER OF THE YEAR: Crowded House
- MUSICAL THEATRE PRODUCTION: Into The Woods
- SUPPORTING MUSICAL THEATRICAL PERFORMER: Sharon Millerchip
- MUSICAL THEATRE PERFORMER FEMALE: Judi Connelli
- MUSICAL THEATRE PERFORMER MALE: Philip Quast
- MUSICAL THEATRE PERFORMER OF THE YEAR: Philip Quast
- OUTSTANDING CONTRIBUTION TO MUSICAL THEATRE: Brian Thomson
- JAZZ INSTRUMENTAL PERFORMER OF THE YEAR: Dale Barlow
- JAZZ VOCAL PERFORMER OF THE YEAR: Kerrie Biddell
- JAZZ GROUP: Bobby Gebert Trio
- JAZZ PERFORMER OF THE YEAR: Bobby Gebert
- VARIETY PRODUCTION SHOW: Licensed to Thrill
- VARIETY DUO/TRIO: Triple Treat
- VARIETY GROUP: The Four Kinsmen
- INSTRUMENTAL ACT: Igor Cavdarski
- SPECIALITY ACT: Phil Cass
- VERSATILE VARIETY PERFORMANCE: Peter Kaye
- COMEDY GROUP: The Umbilical Brothers
- VARIETY COMEDY PERFORMER: Geraldine Doyle
- NEW WAVE COMEDY PERFORMER: Steady Eddy
- COMEDY PERFORMER OF THE YEAR: Steady Eddy
- MALE VOCAL VARIETY PERFORMER: Wayne Cornell
- FEMALE VOCAL VARIETY PERFORMER: Julie Anthony
- VARIETY PERFORMER OF THE YEAR: The Four Kinsmen
- AUSTRALIAN SHOWBUSINESS AMBASSADOR: Barry Humphries
- JOHN CAMPBELL FELLOWSHIP AWARD: Colleen Clifford
- JOHNNY O'KEEFE ENCOURAGEMENT AWARD: Igor Cavdarski
- AUSTRALIAN PERFORMER OF THE YEAR: Anthony Warlow

=== 1994: 20th Mo Awards ===
The twentieth MO Awards took place on 28 June 1995 at Regent Hotel, Sydney. It was compered by Alan Jones.

- 1 & 2 MAN BAND: Twin Set
- ACCOMPANYING BAND: The Lionel Huntington Orchestra
- RESIDENT TECHNICAL SUPPORT: Toni Venditti
- COMPERE OF THE YEAR: Dee Donovan
- VENUE OF THE YEAR: Blacktown Workers Club
- CLASSICAL PERFORMANCE OF THE YEAR: Richard Tognetti
- DANCE PERFORMANCE OF THE YEAR: Steven Heathcote
- OPERATIC PERFORMANCE OF THE YEAR: Yvonne Kenny
- COUNTRY GROUP: Fargone Beauties
- MALE COUNTRY ENTERTAINER: Lee Kernaghan and Graeme Connors (tie)
- FEMALE COUNTRY ENTERTAINER: Gina Jeffreys
- ROCK PERFORMER OF THE YEAR: The Cruel Sea
- MUSICAL THEATRE PRODUCTION: West Side Story
- SUPPORTING MUSICAL THEATRICAL PERFORMER: Caroline O'Connor
- MUSICAL THEATRE PERFORMER FEMALE: Marina Prior
- MUSICAL THEATRE PERFORMER MALE: David Atkins
- OUTSTANDING CONTRIBUTION TO MUSICAL THEATRE: Brian Thomson
- JAZZ INSTRUMENTAL PERFORMER OF THE YEAR: Bernie McGann
- JAZZ VOCAL PERFORMER OF THE YEAR: Marie Wilson
- JAZZ GROUP: The Catholics
- VARIETY PRODUCTION SHOW: Licensed to Thrill
- VARIETY DUO/TRIO: The Flanagans
- VARIETY GROUP: The 4 Trax
- VOCAL/INSTRUMENTAL PERFORMER: Joey Fimmano
- INSTRUMENTAL PERFORMER: Ross Maio
- SPECIALITY ACT: Richard Scholes
- VERSATILE VARIETY PERFORMANCE: Peter Kaye
- COMEDY GROUP: The Umbilical Brothers
- VARIETY COMEDY PERFORMER: Paul Martell
- NEW WAVE COMEDY PERFORMER: Steady Eddy and Vince Sorrenti
- MALE VOCAL VARIETY PERFORMER: Wayne Cornell
- FEMALE VOCAL VARIETY PERFORMER: Jenifer Green
- VARIETY PERFORMER OF THE YEAR: The 4 Trax
- AUSTRALIAN SHOWBUSINESS AMBASSADOR: David Atkins
- 20TH ANNIVERSARY YOUTH ACHIEVEMENT: Lucinda Bryant
- JOHN CAMPBELL FELLOWSHIP AWARD: Jack Neary and Geoff Mack
- JOHNNY O'KEEFE ENCOURAGEMENT AWARD: Melinda Schneider
- AUSTRALIAN PERFORMER OF THE YEAR: Tommy Emmanuel

=== 1995: 21st Mo Awards ===
The twenty-first MO Awards took place on 18 June 1996 at the Sydney Entertainment Centre. It was compered by Kerri-Anne Kennerley.

- 1 & 2 MAN BAND: Brian King and Darren Williams (tie)
- ACCOMPANYING BAND: Western Front
- RESIDENT TECHNICAL SUPPORT: B Lloyd/J Dwyer/D Williams/P Walker/J Adler
- COMPERE OF THE YEAR: Neil Hanson
- VENUE OF THE YEAR: Wentworthville Leagues Club
- CLASSICAL PERFORMANCE OF THE YEAR: Simone Young
- MALE DANCE PERFORMANCE OF THE YEAR: Dein Perry
- FEMALE DANCE PERFORMANCE OF THE YEAR: Rosalind Crisp
- OPERATIC PERFORMANCE OF THE YEAR: Graham Pushee
- COUNTRY GROUP: The Dead Ringer Band
- MALE COUNTRY ENTERTAINER: Wayne Horsburgh
- FEMALE COUNTRY ENTERTAINER: Felicity Urquhart
- ROCK PERFORMER OF THE YEAR: Tina Arena
- MUSICAL THEATRE PRODUCTION: Hello Dolly
- SUPPORTING MUSICAL THEATRICAL PERFORMER: Bert Newton
- MUSICAL THEATRE PERFORMER FEMALE: Jill Perryman
- MUSICAL THEATRE PERFORMER MALE: Anthony Warlow
- OUTSTANDING CONTRIBUTION TO MUSICAL THEATRE: David Atkins
- JAZZ INSTRUMENTAL PERFORMER OF THE YEAR: Sandy Evans
- JAZZ VOCAL PERFORMER OF THE YEAR: Kerrie Biddell
- JAZZ GROUP: Ten Part Invention
- VARIETY PRODUCTION SHOW: Licensed to Thrill
- VARIETY DUO/TRIO: Triple Treat
- VARIETY GROUP: The Four Kinsmen
- VOCAL/INSTRUMENTAL PERFORMER: Joey Fimmano
- INSTRUMENTAL PERFORMER: Bernard Walz
- SPECIALITY ACT: Murray Raine
- VERSATILE VARIETY PERFORMANCE: Phil Cass
- COMEDY GROUP: The Umbilical Brothers
- VARIETY COMEDY PERFORMER: Col Elliott
- NEW WAVE COMEDY PERFORMER: Steady Eddy
- MALE VOCAL VARIETY PERFORMER: Stephen Fisher-King
- FEMALE VOCAL VARIETY PERFORMER: Julie Anthony
- VARIETY PERFORMER OF THE YEAR: The Four Kinsmen
- AUSTRALIAN SHOWBUSINESS AMBASSADOR: David Atkins
- JOHN CAMPBELL FELLOWSHIP AWARD: Angry Anderson
- JOHNNY O'KEEFE ENCOURAGEMENT AWARD: Davidia Coombes
- AUSTRALIAN PERFORMER OF THE YEAR: Tina Arena

=== 1996: 22nd Mo Awards ===
The twenty-second MO Awards took place on 18 June 1997 at the Sydney Entertainment Centre. It was compered by Susie Elelman.

- 1 & 2 MAN BAND: Darren Williams
- ACCOMPANYING BAND: Ron Hearne Band
- RESIDENT TECHNICAL SUPPORT: Toni Venditti
- COMPERE OF THE YEAR: Mark Kristian
- VENUE OF THE YEAR: Petersham RSL Club
- CLASSICAL PERFORMANCE OF THE YEAR: Michael Kieran Harvey
- MALE DANCE PERFORMANCE OF THE YEAR: Dein Perry
- FEMALE DANCE PERFORMANCE OF THE YEAR: Vicki Attard
- OPERATIC PERFORMANCE OF THE YEAR: Elizabeth Whitehouse
- COUNTRY GROUP: Dead Ringer Band
- MALE COUNTRY ENTERTAINER: Graeme Connors
- FEMALE COUNTRY ENTERTAINER: Gina Jeffreys
- ROCK PERFORMER OF THE YEAR: You Am I
- MUSICAL THEATRE PRODUCTION: Beauty and the Beast
- SUPPORTING MUSICAL THEATRICAL PERFORMER: Caroline O'Connor
- MUSICAL THEATRE PERFORMER FEMALE: Sharon Millerchip
- MUSICAL THEATRE PERFORMER MALE: Hugh Jackman and Michael Cormick (Tie)
- OUTSTANDING CONTRIBUTION TO MUSICAL THEATRE: Greg Crease
- JAZZ INSTRUMENTAL PERFORMER OF THE YEAR: Bob Barnard
- JAZZ VOCAL PERFORMER OF THE YEAR: Vince Jones
- JAZZ GROUP: Directions In Groove
- VARIETY PRODUCTION SHOW: Licensed to Thrill
- VARIETY DUO/TRIO: Andrews Sisters
- VARIETY GROUP: The Four Kinsmen
- VOCAL/INSTRUMENTAL PERFORMER: Joey Fimmano
- INSTRUMENTAL PERFORMER: Bernard Walz
- SPECIALITY ACT: Phil Cass
- VERSATILE VARIETY PERFORMANCE: Liz Taylor
- COMEDY GROUP: The Umbilical Brothers
- VARIETY COMEDY PERFORMER: Col Elliott
- NEW WAVE COMEDY PERFORMER: Vince Sorrenti
- MALE VOCAL VARIETY PERFORMER: Stephen Fisher-King
- FEMALE VOCAL VARIETY PERFORMER: Jane Scali
- VARIETY PERFORMER OF THE YEAR: Stephen Fisher-King
- AUSTRALIAN SHOWBUSINESS AMBASSADOR: David Helfgott
- JOHN CAMPBELL FELLOWSHIP AWARD: Jimmy Little
- JOHNNY O'KEEFE ENCOURAGEMENT AWARD: David Harris
- AUSTRALIAN PERFORMER OF THE YEAR: Tommy Emmanuel

=== 1997: 23rd Mo Awards ===
The twenty-third MO Awards took place on 23 June 1998 at the Sydney Entertainment Centre. It was compered by Don Lane.

- 1 & 2 MAN BAND: Darren Williams
- ACCOMPANYING BAND: Lionel Huntington Orchestra
- RESIDENT TECHNICAL SUPPORT: K Lennis, M Pepper, G Harbour
- COMPERE OF THE YEAR: Mark Kristian
- VENUE OF THE YEAR: Canterbury-Hurlstone Park RSL Club
- CLASSICAL PERFORMANCE OF THE YEAR: Michael Kieran Harvey
- MALE DANCE PERFORMANCE OF THE YEAR: Dein Perry
- FEMALE DANCE PERFORMANCE OF THE YEAR: Lisa Bolte
- OPERATIC PERFORMANCE OF THE YEAR: Cheryl Barker
- COUNTRY GROUP: Dead Ringer Band
- MALE COUNTRY ENTERTAINER: Troy Cassar-Daley
- FEMALE COUNTRY ENTERTAINER: Felicity Urquhart
- ROCK PERFORMER OF THE YEAR: The Whitlams
- MUSICAL THEATRE PRODUCTION: Cabaret
- SUPPORTING MUSICAL THEATRICAL PERFORMER: David Campbell
- MUSICAL THEATRE PERFORMER FEMALE: Kelley Abbey
- MUSICAL THEATRE PERFORMER MALE: Hugh Jackman
- OUTSTANDING CONTRIBUTION TO MUSICAL THEATRE: David Atkins
- JAZZ INSTRUMENTAL PERFORMER OF THE YEAR: James Morrison
- JAZZ VOCAL PERFORMER OF THE YEAR: Shelley Scown
- JAZZ GROUP: Bernie McGann Trio
- VARIETY PRODUCTION SHOW: Ladies, Laughs and Larrikins
- VARIETY DUO/TRIO: Triple Treat
- VARIETY GROUP: The Four Kinsmen
- VOCAL/INSTRUMENTAL PERFORMER: Shelly White
- INSTRUMENTAL PERFORMER: Bernard Walz
- SPECIALITY ACT: Phil Cass
- VERSATILE VARIETY PERFORMANCE: Maggie Scott
- COMEDY GROUP: The Umbilical Brothers
- VARIETY COMEDY PERFORMER: Brian Doyle
- NEW WAVE COMEDY PERFORMER: Nick Giannopoulos
- MALE VOCAL VARIETY PERFORMER: Stephen Fisher-King
- FEMALE VOCAL VARIETY PERFORMER: Jane Scali
- VARIETY PERFORMER OF THE YEAR: Stephen Fisher-King
- AUSTRALIAN SHOWBUSINESS AMBASSADOR: Tap Dogs
- JOHN CAMPBELL FELLOWSHIP AWARD: Toni Stevens
- JOHNNY O'KEEFE ENCOURAGEMENT AWARD: Nathan Foley
- AUSTRALIAN PERFORMER OF THE YEAR: Human Nature

=== 1998: 24th Mo Awards ===
The twenty-fourth MO Awards took place on 22 June 1999 at the Sydney Entertainment Centre. It was compered by Neil Hanson, Liz Taylor and Chris De Havilland.

- 1 & 2 MAN BAND: Talisman
- ACCOMPANYING BAND: Marconi Dance Band
- RESIDENT TECHNICAL SUPPORT: Miles Harris
- COMPERE OF THE YEAR: Billy Roy
- VENUE OF THE YEAR: Panthers World of Entertainment
- CLASSICAL PERFORMANCE: Michael Kieran Harvey & Bernadette Balkus (tie)
- MALE DANCE PERFORMANCE OF THE YEAR: Gideon Obarzanek
- FEMALE DANCE PERFORMANCE OF THE YEAR: Kate Champion
- OPERATIC PERFORMANCE OF THE YEAR: John Wegner
- COUNTRY GROUP: Dead Ringer Band
- MALE COUNTRY ENTERTAINER: Troy Cassar-Daley
- FEMALE COUNTRY ENTERTAINER: Gina Jeffreys
- ROCK PERFORMER OF THE YEAR: Natalie Imbruglia
- MUSICAL THEATRE PRODUCTION: The Boy from Oz
- SUPPORTING MUSICAL THEATRICAL PERFORMER: Pamela Rabe
- MUSICAL THEATRE PERFORMER FEMALE: Caroline O'Connor
- MUSICAL THEATRE PERFORMER MALE: Todd McKenney
- OUTSTANDING CONTRIBUTION TO MUSICAL THEATRE: David Atkins
- JAZZ INSTRUMENTAL PERFORMER OF THE YEAR: Kevin Hunt
- JAZZ VOCAL PERFORMER OF THE YEAR: Marie Wilson
- JAZZ GROUP: Trevor Griffin Sextet
- VARIETY PRODUCTION SHOW: Ladies, Laughs and Larrikins
- VARIETY DUO/TRIO: Aubrey and Martin
- VARIETY GROUP: The Four Kinsmen
- VOCAL/INSTRUMENTAL PERFORMER: Danny Elliott
- INSTRUMENTAL PERFORMER: Ian Cooper
- SPECIALITY ACT: Phil Cass
- VERSATILE VARIETY PERFORMANCE: Maggie Scott
- COMEDY GROUP: Thomas and Moore
- VARIETY COMEDY PERFORMER: Kenny Graham
- NEW WAVE COMEDY PERFORMER: Vince Sorrenti
- MALE VOCAL VARIETY PERFORMER: Stephen Fisher-King
- FEMALE VOCAL VARIETY PERFORMER: Jane Scali
- VARIETY PERFORMER OF THE YEAR: Maggie Scott
- AUSTRALIAN SHOWBUSINESS AMBASSADOR: Natalie Imbruglia
- ARENA PERFORMER OF THE YEAR: Anthony Warlow
- JOHN CAMPBELL FELLOWSHIP AWARD: John Laws
- JOHNNY O'KEEFE ENCOURAGEMENT AWARD: Adam Brand and Tim Draxl (Tie)
- AUSTRALIAN PERFORMER OF THE YEAR: The Main Event (Anthony Warlow, John Farnham and Olivia Newton-John)

=== 1999: 25th Mo Awards ===
The twenty-fifth MO Awards took place on 20 June 2000 at the Sydney Entertainment Centre. It was compered by Don Lane.

- 1 & 2 MAN BAND: Twin Set
- ACCOMPANYING BAND: Patchwork
- RESIDENT TECHNICAL SUPPORT: John Adams
- COMPERE OF THE YEAR: Mark Kristian
- VENUE OF THE YEAR: Canterbury Hurlstone Park RSL Club
- CLASSICAL PERFORMER OF THE YEAR: Michael Kieran Harvey
- MALE DANCE PERFORMER/CHOREOGRAPHER OF YEAR: Graeme Murphy
- FEMALE DANCE PERFORMER/CHOREOGRAPHER OF YEAR: Kelley Abbey
- OPERATIC PERFORMANCE OF THE YEAR: Peter Coleman-Wright
- COUNTRY GROUP: Dead Ringer Band
- MALE COUNTRY ENTERTAINER: Troy Cassar-Daley
- FEMALE COUNTRY ENTERTAINER: Kasey Chambers
- ROCK PERFORMER OF THE YEAR: Powderfinger
- MUSICAL THEATRE PRODUCTION: The Boy from Oz
- SUPPORTING MUSICAL THEATRICAL PERFORMER: Angela Toohey
- MUSICAL THEATRE PERFORMER FEMALE: Caroline O'Connor
- MUSICAL THEATRE PERFORMER MALE: Todd McKenney
- OUTSTANDING CONTRIBUTION TO MUSICAL THEATRE: Gale Edwards
- JAZZ INSTRUMENTAL PERFORMER OF THE YEAR: James Morrison
- JAZZ VOCAL PERFORMER OF THE YEAR: Shelley Scown
- JAZZ GROUP: Ten Part Invention
- VARIETY PRODUCTION SHOW: Ladies, Laughs and Larrikins
- VARIETY DUO/TRIO: Aubrey and Martin
- VARIETY GROUP: The Zips
- VOCAL/INSTRUMENTAL PERFORMER: Danny Elliott
- INSTRUMENTAL PERFORMER: Ian Cooper
- SPECIALITY ACT: Murray Raine Puppets
- VERSATILE VARIETY PERFORMANCE: Maggie Scott
- COMEDY GROUP: The Scared Weird Little Guys
- VARIETY COMEDY PERFORMER: Kenny Graham
- NEW WAVE COMEDY PERFORMER: Nick Giannopoulos
- MALE VOCAL VARIETY PERFORMER: Stephen Fisher-King
- FEMALE VOCAL VARIETY PERFORMER: Rhonda Burchmore
- VARIETY PERFORMER OF THE YEAR: Maggie Scott
- AUSTRALIAN SHOWBUSINESS AMBASSADOR: Savage Garden
- ARENA PERFORMER OF THE YEAR: John Farnham
- JOHN CAMPBELL FELLOWSHIP AWARD: Daryl Somers
- JOHNNY O'KEEFE ENCOURAGEMENT AWARD: String Fever
- AUSTRALIAN PERFORMER OF THE YEAR: Savage Garden

=== 2000: 26th Mo Awards ===
The twenty-sixth MO Awards took place on 9 July 2001 at the Sydney Town Hall. It was compered by Vince Sorrenti.

- 1 & 2 MAN BAND: Twin Set
- ACCOMPANYING BAND: The Marconi Dance Band
- RESIDENT TECHNICAL SUPPORT: Shane Newham
- COMPERE OF THE YEAR: Mark Kristian
- VENUE OF THE YEAR: South Sydney Juniors RLFC
- FEMALE ACTOR IN A PLAY: Maggie Kirkpatrick
- MALE ACTOR IN A PLAY: Bille Brown
- THEATRE PRODUCTION OF THE YEAR: The Secret Room
- CLASSICAL/OPERA PERFORMER OF THE YEAR: Diana Doherty
- DANCE PERFORMER/CHOREOGRAPHER OF THE YEAR: Miranda Coney
- COUNTRY GROUP: Feral Swing Cats
- MALE COUNTRY ENTERTAINER: Adam Brand
- FEMALE COUNTRY ENTERTAINER: Melinda Schneider
- CONTEMPORARY ROCK PERFORMER OF THE YEAR: Powderfinger
- CLASSIC ROCK PERFORMER OF THE YEAR: Doug Parkinson
- MUSICAL THEATRE PRODUCTION: Shout!
- SUPPORTING MUSICAL THEATRICAL PERFORMER: Chrissie Amphlett
- MUSICAL THEATRE PERFORMER FEMALE: Caroline O'Connor
- MUSICAL THEATRE PERFORMER MALE: David Campbell
- JAZZ INSTRUMENTAL PERFORMER OF THE YEAR: James Muller
- JAZZ VOCAL PERFORMER OF THE YEAR: Michelle Nicolle
- JAZZ GROUP: James Muller Trio
- VARIETY PRODUCTION SHOW: Forever Diamond
- VARIETY DUO/TRIO: The Robertson Brothers
- VARIETY GROUP: Phoenix
- VOCAL/INSTRUMENTAL PERFORMER: Shelly White
- INSTRUMENTAL PERFORMER: Slava Grigoryan
- SPECIALITY ACT: Brendan Montana
- VERSATILE VARIETY PERFORMANCE: Greg Doolan
- COMEDY GROUP: Lano and Woodley
- MALE COMEDY PERFORMER OF THE YEAR: Jonathan Biggins
- FEMALE COMEDY PERFORMER OF THE YEAR: Gretel Killeen
- MALE VOCAL VARIETY PERFORMER: John Bowles
- FEMALE VOCAL VARIETY PERFORMER: Annie Frances
- VARIETY PERFORMER OF THE YEAR: Annie Frances
- AUSTRALIAN SHOWBUSINESS AMBASSADOR: Keith Urban
- SPECIAL EVENT OF THE YEAR: 2000 Summer Olympics opening ceremony
- JOHN CAMPBELL FELLOWSHIP AWARD: Maria Venuti
- JOHNNY O'KEEFE ENCOURAGEMENT AWARD: Nikki Webster
- AUSTRALIAN PERFORMER OF THE YEAR: Kylie Minogue

=== 2001: 27th Mo Awards ===
The twenty-seventh MO Awards took place on 24 June 2002 at the Tumbalong Park Ballroom. It was compered by Liz Taylor and Peter Cousens.

- 1 & 2 MAN BAND: Take Two
- ACCOMPANYING BAND: Lionel Huntington Orchestra
- RESIDENT TECHNICAL SUPPORT: Paul Kelleners
- COMPERE OF THE YEAR: Neil Hanson
- VENUE OF THE YEAR: Canterbury-Hurlstone Park RSL Club
- LIVE RADIO PERFORMER OF THE YEAR: John Bleby
- FEMALE ACTOR IN A PLAY: Jacki Weaver
- MALE ACTOR IN A PLAY: Peter Carroll
- THEATRE PRODUCTION OF THE YEAR: Cloudstreet
- CLASSICAL/OPERA PERFORMER OF THE YEAR: Peter Coleman-Wright
- DANCE PERFORMER/CHOREOGRAPHER OF THE YEAR: Tracey Carrodus
- COUNTRY GROUP: The Wolverines
- MALE COUNTRY ENTERTAINER: Adam Brand
- FEMALE COUNTRY ENTERTAINER: Kasey Chambers
- CONTEMPORARY ROCK PERFORMER OF THE YEAR: Human Nature
- CLASSIC ROCK PERFORMER OF THE YEAR: Doug Parkinson
- MUSICAL THEATRE PRODUCTION: Sweeney Todd
- SUPPORTING MUSICAL THEATRICAL PERFORMER: Jackie Love
- MUSICAL THEATRE PERFORMER FEMALE: Judi Connelli
- MUSICAL THEATRE PERFORMER MALE: Wayne Scott Kermond
- JAZZ INSTRUMENTAL PERFORMER OF THE YEAR: Joe Chindamo
- JAZZ VOCAL PERFORMER OF THE YEAR: Marie Wilson
- JAZZ GROUP: Sydney All Star Big Band
- VARIETY PRODUCTION SHOW: Forever Diamond
- VARIETY DUO/TRIO: The Robertson Brothers
- VARIETY GROUP: The Delltones
- VOCAL/INSTRUMENTAL PERFORMER: Shelly White
- INSTRUMENTAL PERFORMER: String Fever
- SPECIALITY ACT: Darren Carr
- VERSATILE VARIETY PERFORMANCE: Peter Kay
- COMEDY GROUP: The Umbilical Brothers
- MALE COMEDY PERFORMER OF THE YEAR: Paul Martell
- FEMALE COMEDY PERFORMER OF THE YEAR: Geraldine Doyle
- MALE VOCAL VARIETY PERFORMER: Stephen Fisher-King
- FEMALE VOCAL VARIETY PERFORMER: Seamus Earley
- VARIETY PERFORMER OF THE YEAR: String Fever
- AUSTRALIAN SHOWBUSINESS AMBASSADOR: Kylie Minogue
- JOHN CAMPBELL FELLOWSHIP AWARD: Reg Lindsay
- JOHNNY O'KEEFE ENCOURAGEMENT AWARD: Lisa Crouch
- AUSTRALIAN PERFORMER OF THE YEAR: Kylie Minogue

=== 2002: 28th Mo Awards ===
The twenty-eighth MO Awards took place on 16 June 2003 at the Sydney Entertainment Centre. It was compered by Frankie J Holden.

- 1 & 2 PERFORMER BAND: Mike Mathieson
- ACCOMPANYING BAND: Patchwork
- RESIDENT TECHNICAL SUPPORT: Paul Kelleners - Twin Towns
- COMPERE OF THE YEAR: Mark Kristian
- VENUE OF THE YEAR: Canterbury-Hurlstone Park RSL Club
- LIVE RADIO PERFORMER: Toni Tenaglia (SAFM - Morning)
- LIVE RADIO TEAM: The Amanda Blair Team (SAFM Adelaide - Breakfast)
- FEMALE ACTOR IN A PLAY: Miranda Otto
- MALE ACTOR IN A PLAY: Colin Friels
- THEATRE PRODUCTION OF THE YEAR: Copenhagen
- CLASSICAL/OPERA PERFORMER OF THE YEAR: Elizabeth Whitehouse
- DANCE PERFORMER/CHOREOGRAPHER OF THE YEAR: Steven Heathcote
- COUNTRY GROUP: The Wolverines
- MALE COUNTRY ENTERTAINER: Troy Cassar-Daley
- FEMALE COUNTRY ENTERTAINER: Melinda Schneider
- CONTEMPORARY ROCK PERFORMER OF THE YEAR: Human Nature
- CLASSIC ROCK PERFORMER OF THE YEAR: Doug Parkinson
- MUSICAL THEATRE PRODUCTION: Cabaret
- SUPPORTING MUSICAL THEATRICAL PERFORMER: Judi Connelli
- MUSICAL THEATRE PERFORMER FEMALE: Tamsin Carroll
- MUSICAL THEATRE PERFORMER MALE: Toby Allen
- JAZZ INSTRUMENTAL PERFORMER OF THE YEAR: James Morrison
- JAZZ VOCAL PERFORMER OF THE YEAR: Michelle Nicolle
- JAZZ GROUP: Sydney All Star Big Band
- VARIETY PRODUCTION SHOW: Forever Diamond
- VARIETY DUO/TRIO: The Robertson Brothers
- VARIETY GROUP: The Zips
- VOCAL/INSTRUMENTAL PERFORMER: Shelly White
- INSTRUMENTAL PERFORMER: String Fever
- SPECIALITY ACT: Brendan Mon Tanner
- VERSATILE VARIETY PERFORMANCE: Liz Taylor
- COMEDY GROUP: The Umbilical Brothers
- MALE COMEDY PERFORMER OF THE YEAR: Paul Martell
- FEMALE COMEDY PERFORMER OF THE YEAR: Maggie Scott
- MALE VOCAL VARIETY PERFORMER: Darren Williams
- FEMALE VOCAL VARIETY PERFORMER: Seamus Earley
- VARIETY PERFORMER OF THE YEAR: Darren Williams
- AUSTRALIAN SHOWBUSINESS AMBASSADOR: Kylie Minogue
- JOHN CAMPBELL FELLOWSHIP AWARD: Reg Lindsay
- JOHNNY O'KEEFE ENCOURAGEMENT AWARD: Adam Scicluna
- AUSTRALIAN PERFORMER OF THE YEAR: Kylie Minogue

=== 2003: 29th Mo Awards ===
The twenty-ninth MO Awards took place on 28 June 2004 at the Sydney Entertainment Centre. It was compered by Jean Kittson.

- 1 & 2 PERFORMER BAND: Take Two
- ACCOMPANYING BAND: Patchwork
- RESIDENT TECHNICAL SUPPORT: Paul Kelleners & Michael Pepper/ Simon Wade (Tie)
- COMPERE OF THE YEAR: Neil Hanson & Mark Kristian (Tie)
- VENUE OF THE YEAR: Canterbury-Hurlstone Park RSL Club
- FEMALE ACTOR IN A PLAY: Sigrid Thornton
- MALE ACTOR IN A PLAY: Marcus Graham
- THEATRE PRODUCTION OF THE YEAR: The Blue Room
- CLASSICAL/OPERA PERFORMER OF THE YEAR: Emma Matthews
- DANCE PERFORMER/CHOREOGRAPHER OF THE YEAR: Bradley Chatfield
- COUNTRY GROUP: The Wolverines
- MALE COUNTRY ENTERTAINER: Troy Cassar-Daley
- FEMALE COUNTRY ENTERTAINER: Melinda Schneider
- CONTEMPORARY ROCK PERFORMER OF THE YEAR: Doug Parkinson
- CLASSIC ROCK PERFORMER OF THE YEAR: Birtles Shorrock Goble and Jimmy Little (Tie)
- MUSICAL THEATRE PRODUCTION: The Lion King
- SUPPORTING MUSICAL THEATRICAL PERFORMER: Terry Bader
- MUSICAL THEATRE PERFORMER FEMALE: Buyisile Zama
- MUSICAL THEATRE PERFORMER MALE: Toby Allen
- JAZZ INSTRUMENTAL PERFORMER OF THE YEAR: Joe Chindamo
- JAZZ VOCAL PERFORMER OF THE YEAR: Michelle Nicolle
- JAZZ GROUP: The Sydney All Star Big Band
- VARIETY PRODUCTION SHOW: Forever Diamond
- VARIETY DUO/TRIO: The Robertson Brothers
- VARIETY GROUP: The Ten Tenors
- VOCAL/INSTRUMENTAL PERFORMER: Shelly White
- INSTRUMENTAL PERFORMER: String Fever
- SPECIALITY ACT: Darren Carr
- VERSATILE VARIETY PERFORMANCE: Greg Doolan
- COMEDY GROUP: Thomas and Moore
- MALE COMEDY PERFORMER OF THE YEAR: Paul Martell and Calvin De Grey (Tie)
- FEMALE COMEDY PERFORMER OF THE YEAR: Geraldine Doyle
- MALE VOCAL VARIETY PERFORMER: Stephen Fisher-King
- FEMALE VOCAL VARIETY PERFORMER: Lisa Crouch and Seamus Earley (Tie)
- VARIETY PERFORMER OF THE YEAR: Lisa Crouch
- AUSTRALIAN SHOWBUSINESS AMBASSADOR: Hugh Jackman
- JOHNNY O'KEEFE ENCOURAGEMENT AWARD: David Stephens
- AUSTRALIAN PERFORMER OF THE YEAR: Delta Goodrem

=== 2004: 30th Mo Awards ===
The thirtieth MO Awards took place on 28 April 2006 at the Sydney Entertainment Centre. It was presented by Ken Laing, Tommy Tycho and Geoff Harvey.

- 1 & 2 PERFORMER BAND: Just Jammin'
- ACCOMPANYING BAND: Steve Isoardi Band
- RESIDENT TECHNICAL SUPPORT: Gabby Venditti
- COMPERE OF THE YEAR: Rikki Organ
- VENUE OF THE YEAR: Star City Casino
- FEMALE ACTOR IN A PLAY: Cate Blanchett
- MALE ACTOR IN A PLAY: Garry McDonald
- THEATRE PRODUCTION OF THE YEAR: Hedda Gabler
- CLASSICAL/OPERA PERFORMER OF THE YEAR: Teddy Tahu Rhodes
- DANCE PERFORMER/CHOREOGRAPHER OF THE YEAR: Benjamin Nicholls
- COUNTRY GROUP: The Flood
- MALE COUNTRY ENTERTAINER: John Stephan
- FEMALE COUNTRY ENTERTAINER: Melinda Schneider
- CONTEMPORARY ROCK PERFORMER OF THE YEAR: Anthony Callea
- CLASSIC ROCK PERFORMER OF THE YEAR: Marcia Hines
- MUSICAL THEATRE PRODUCTION: Dirty Dancing
- SUPPORTING MUSICAL THEATRICAL PERFORMER: Tony Sheldon
- MUSICAL THEATRE PERFORMER FEMALE: Chloe Dallimore
- MUSICAL THEATRE PERFORMER MALE: Reg Livermore
- JAZZ INSTRUMENTAL PERFORMER OF THE YEAR: Andy Firth
- JAZZ VOCAL PERFORMER OF THE YEAR: Emma Pask
- JAZZ GROUP: The Sydney All Star Big Band
- CHILDREN'S SHOW: The Wiggles
- VARIETY PRODUCTION SHOW: Björn Again
- VARIETY DUO/TRIO: Bella
- VARIETY GROUP: The Shy Guys
- VOCAL/INSTRUMENTAL PERFORMER: Bob Howe
- INSTRUMENTAL PERFORMER: Slava Grigoryan
- SPECIALITY ACT: Darren Carr
- VERSATILE VARIETY PERFORMANCE: Todd McKenney
- COMEDY GROUP: The Kransky Sisters
- MALE COMEDY PERFORMER OF THE YEAR: Gerry Connolly
- FEMALE COMEDY PERFORMER OF THE YEAR: Magda Szubanski
- MALE VOCAL VARIETY PERFORMER: Adam Scicluna
- FEMALE VOCAL VARIETY PERFORMER: Karen Beckett
- VARIETY PERFORMER OF THE YEAR: Wayne Scott Kermond
- AUSTRALIAN SHOWBUSINESS AMBASSADOR: Hugh Jackman
- JOHNNY O'KEEFE ENCOURAGEMENT AWARD: The Baileys
- AUSTRALIAN PERFORMER OF THE YEAR: Anthony Warlow

=== 2005 ===
There were no awards for 2005.

=== 2006: 31st Mo Awards ===
The thirtieth-first MO Awards took place on 28 August 2007 at the Bankstown Sports Club. It was presented by Rodney Marks, Darren Carr, Liz Layton, Kenny Graham and Johnny Pace.

- THREE OR MORE PERFORMER BAND: The Williams Brothers
- COMPERE OF THE YEAR: Rikki Organ
- INSTRUMENTAL or VOCAL INSTRUMENTAL PERFORMER: Joey Fimmano
- CLASSICAL/OPERA PERFORMER: Helen Zerefos
- DANCE PERFORMER: Wayne Scott Kermond
- RICKY MAY JAZZ PERFORMER: James Morrison
- VARIETY DUO OR TRIO PERFORMER: Triple Treat
- RESIDENT TECHNICAL SUPPORT: Blacktown Workers
- TWO PERFORMER BAND: Take Two
- TRIBUTE SHOW: Tom Jones Experience - Jacques Renay
- BRIAN STACEY MUSICAL THEATRE PERFORMER: Tony Sheldon
- KEN LITTLEWOOD AND TOSHI SPECIALTY ACT: Darren Carr
- ACCOMPANYING BAND: Western Front
- BEST VENUE: Blacktown Workers
- FEMALE VOCAL PERFORMER: Karen Beckett
- ONE PERFORMER BAND: Ziggy Zapata
- MALE VOCAL PERFORMER: Tony Pantano
- ACTOR IN PLAY: Geoffrey Rush
- SHOWBAND: Frogs on Toast and The Zips (Tie)
- THE FOUR KINSMEN PRODUCTION SHOW: The Great Pretenders
- ROCK PERFORMER: Billy Thorpe (Posthumous Award)
- VERSATILE PERFORMER: Darren Carr
- COMEDY PERFORMER: Paul Martell
- SLIM DUSTY COUNTRY PERFORMER: Melinda Schneider
- PETER ALLEN VARIETY PERFORMER: Danny Elliott
- JOHNNY O'KEEFE ENCOURAGEMENT AWARD: Nicole Venditti
- AUSTRALIAN PERFORMER OF THE YEAR: Hugh Jackman
- OUTSTANDING CONTRIBUTION TO AUSTRALIAN COMEDY: Rodney Rude
- OUTSTANDING CONTRIBUTION TO AUSTRALIAN MUSIC: Aaron McMillan
- JOHN CAMPBELL FELLOWSHIP AWARD: Jonathon Welch
- HALL OF FAME: Slim De Grey

=== 2007: 32nd Mo Awards ===
The thirty-second MO Awards took place on 17 June 2008 at the Bankstown Sports Club. It was compered by Donnie Sutherland;.

- ONE PERFORMER BAND: Roland Storm
- TWO PERFORMER BAND: The Williams Brothers
- THREE OR MORE PERFORMER BAND: The Williams Brothers
- VERSATILE PERFORMER: Darren Carr
- RESIDENTIAL TECHNICAL SUPPORT: Blacktown Workers Club
- CLASSICAL/OPERA PERFORMER: Anthony Warlow
- CHILDREN'S ENTERTAINMENT: Marty & Emu Crazy Kids Show
- BRAIN STACEY MALE MUSICAL THEATRE PERFORMER: Wayne Scott Kermond
- FEMALE VOCAL PERFORMER: Karen Beckett
- SHOWBAND: The Zips
- COMPERE OF THE YEAR: Bobby Bradford
- BRIAN STACEY FEMALE MUSICAL THEATRE PERFORMER: Lola Nixon
- BEST VENUE: Blacktown Workers Club
- THE FOUR KINSMEN PRODUCTION SHOW: Frogs on Toast
- SLIM DUSTY COUNTRY MALE VOCAL PERFORMER: Wayne Horsburgh
- ACCOMPANYING BAND: Western Front
- VARIETY DUO OR TRIO: Robertson Bros & The Williams Brothers (Tie)
- COUNTRY FEMALE VOCAL PERFORMER: Melinda Schneider
- COUNTRY GROUP: The Wolverines
- INSTRUMENTAL/ VOCAL PERFORMER: Ziggy Zapata
- DANCE PERFORMER: Lucinda Dunn
- RICKY MAY MALE VOCAL PERFORMER: Adam Scicluna
- KEN LITTLEWOOD & TOSHI SPECIALTY PERFORMER: Darren Carr
- INSTRUMENTAL or VOCAL/INSTRUMENTAL PERFORMER: Joey Fimmano
- TRIBUTE SHOW: Tom Jones Experience - Jacques Renay
- MATS UNDER 18'S JUNIOR PERFORMER OF THE YEAR: Mark Vincent
- JOHN CAMPBELL FELLOWSHIP AWARD: Liz Taylor
- COMEDY PERFORMER: Kenny Graham
- JOHNNY O'KEEFE ENCOURAGEMENT AWARD: Robert Jeffery
- OUTSTANDING CONTRIBUTION TO COUNTRY MUSIC: Smoky Dawson
- HALL OF FAME AWARD: Judy Stone
- PETER ALLEN AUSTRALIAN PERFORMER OF THE YEAR: Darren Carr

=== 2008: 33rd Mo Awards ===
The thirty-third MO Awards took place on 15 June 2009 at the Bankstown Sports Club. It was compered by Donnie Sutherland.

- ONE PERFORMER BAND: Ziggy Zapata
- TWO PERFORMER BAND: The Williams Brothers
- THREE OR MORE PERFORMER BAND: Rikki Organ and The Organ Grinders
- SHOWBAND: Frogs On Toast
- INSTRUMENTAL or VOCAL/INSTRUMENTAL PERFORMER: Joey Fimmano
- RESIDENT TECHNICAL SUPPORT: Bankstown Sports Club
- SLIM DUSTY MALE COUNTRY VOCAL PERFORMER: Troy Cassar-Daly
- INTERNATIONAL THEME PERFORMER: Aznavour From Today
- TRIBUTE SHOW: Tonite's The Night
- BRIAN STACEY MALE MUSICAL THEATRE PERFORMER: Wayne Scott Kermond
- CHILDREN'S SHOW: Marty and Emu's Crazy Kids Show
- COUNTRY GROUP: The McClymonts
- MATS UNDER 18'S JUNIOR PERFORMER OF THE YEAR: Blake Giles
- VOCAL GROUP: The Robertson Brothers
- KEN LITTLEWOOD AND TOSHI SPECIALTY PERFORMER: Darren Carr
- FEMALE VOCAL PERFORMER: Lisa Crouch
- BEST VENUE: Bankstown Sports Club
- JOHNNY O'KEEFE ENCOURAGEMENT AWARD: Mark Vincent
- BRIAN STACEY FEMALE MUSICAL THEATRE PERFORMER: Marina Prior
- COMPERE OF THE YEAR: Bobby Bradford
- VERSATILE PERFORMER: Wayne Scott Kermond
- CLASSICAL/OPERA PERFORMER: Anthony Warlow
- FEMALE COUNTRY VOCAL PERFORMER: Melinda Schneider
- ACCOMPANYING BAND: Western Front
- JOHN CAMPBELL FELLOWSHIP AWARD: Helen Zerefos
- THE FOUR KINSMEN PRODUCTION SHOW: The Great Pretenders
- RICKY MAY MALE VOCAL PERFORMER: Tony Pantano
- COMEDY PERFORMER: Paul Martell
- VARIETY DUO OR TRIO PERFORMERS: The Rhythmaires
- OUTSTANDING CONTRIBUTION TO VARIETY ENTERTAINMENT: Wayne Scott Kermond
- PETER ALLEN AUSTRALIAN PERFORMER OF THE YEAR: Darren Carr
- HALL OF FAME: Lucky Starr

=== 2009: 34th Mo Awards ===
The thirty-fourth MO Awards took place on 11 May 2010 at the Bankstown Sports Club. It was compered by Donnie Sutherland.

- ONE PERFORMER BAND: Fallon
- TWO PERFORMER BAND: Just Jammin'
- THREE OR MORE PERFORMER BAND: Rikki Organ and The Organ Grinders
- ACCOMPANYING BAND: Vince Lombardo Band
- INSTRUMENTAL/ VOCAL INSTRUMENTAL PERFORMER: Bob Howe
- SHOWBAND: The Kamis
- RESIDENT TECHNICAL SUPPORT: Bankstown Sports Club
- BEST VENUE: Bankstown Sports Club and South Sydney Juniors Leagues Club (Tie)
- CHILDREN'S SHOW: Brendan Mon Tanner
- COMEDIAN OF THE YEAR: Kenny Graham
- VOCAL GROUP: The Robertson Brothers
- KEN LITTLEWOOD & TOSHI SPECIALTY PERFORMER: Darren Carr
- MATS WINNER FOR 2009: Rhian Saunders
- TRIBUTE SHOW: Strictly Bassey
- INTERNATIONAL THEME PERFORMER: Euro Latino
- SLIM DUSTY COUNTRY PERFORMER OR BAND: The McClymonts
- VARIETY DUO OR TRIO PERFORMER: Thomas & Moore
- JOHNNY O'KEEFE ENCOURAGEMENT AWARD: Chris Gable
- COMPERE OF THE YEAR: Rikki Organ
- THE FOUR KINSMEN PRODUCTION SHOW: Back To The Tivoli
- FEMALE VOCAL PERFORMER: Jenifer Green
- RICKY MAY MALE VOCAL PERFORMER: Tony Pantano
- ROCK PERFORMER OR BAND: Brian Cadd
- JOHN CAMPBELL FELLOWSHIP AWARD: Lorrae Desmond, Lynne Fletcher, Dinah Lee, Little Pattie, Jacqui De Paul, Sylvia Raye
- PETER ALLEN AUSTRALIAN PERFORMER OF THE YEAR: Jenifer Green
- HALL OF FAME AWARD: Frank Ifield

=== 2010: 35th Mo Awards ===
The thirty-fifth MO Awards took place on 24 May 2011 at the Bankstown Sports Club. It was compered by Donnie Sutherland, Susie Elelman, John Mangos and Barry Crocker.

- SOLO BAND PERFORMER: Chris Connolly
- TWO MAN PERFORMER BAND: The Williams Brothers
- DANCE BAND: Rikki Organ and the Organ Grinders
- SHOWBAND: The Kamis and The Zips (Tie)
- TRIBUTE SHOW: Strictly Bassey
- INTERNATIONAL THEME PERFORMER: Italian Delight
- JOHN CAMPBELL FELLOWSHIP AWARD: Marty Rhone
- THE FOUR KINSMEN PRODUCTION/PACKAGE SHOW: Back To The Tivoli
- INSTRUMENTAL or VOCAL/INSTRUMENTAL PERFORMER: Bob Howe
- JOHNNY O'KEEFE ENCOURAGEMENT AWARD: The Seltic Sirens
- BEST SPECIALTY ACT: Darren Carr
- VARIETY DUO OR MORE PERFORMERS: Thomas & Moore
- COMPERE OF THE YEAR: Rikki Organ
- HALL OF FAME: Ian Turpie
- SLIM DUSTY COUNTRY PERFORMER: Nicki Gillis & Kel-Anne Brandt
- BEST CHILDREN'S SHOW: Brendan Mon Tanner
- ROCK PERFORMER OR BAND: Guy Sebastian
- ACCOMPANYING BAND: Trojans and Vince Lombardo Band (Tie)
- RESIDENT TECHNICAL SUPPORT: Petersham RSL Club
- FEMALE VOCAL PERFORMER: Jenifer Green
- BEST VENUE: Bankstown Sports Club and Blacktown Workers Club (Tie)
- COMEDIAN OF THE YEAR: Keith Scott
- RODNEY RUDE STAND-UP PERFORMER: Vince Sorrenti
- RICKY MAY MALE PERFORMER: Adam Scicluna
- PETER ALLEN AUSTRALIAN PERFORMER OF THE YEAR: Jenifer Green

=== 2011: 36th Mo Awards ===
The thirty-sixth MO Awards took place on 29 May 2012 at the Bankstown Sports Club. It was compered by Donnie Sutherland, Susie Elelman, John Mangos and Vince Sorrenti.

- BEST SOLO BAND PERFORMER: Chris Connolly
- BEST DUO BAND: Mike Mathieson Duo
- BEST DANCE BAND: Rikki Organ & The Organ Grinders
- BEST VARIETY SHOWBAND: Frogs on Toast
- BEST TRIBUTE SHOW: Desperado – The Eagles Show
- BEST CHILDREN'S SHOW: Franky Valentyn
- BEST SPECIALTY ACT: Darren Carr
- BEST VERSATILE VARIETY ACT: The Burlesque Spectacular
- BEST INTERNATIONAL THEME SHOW: The Seltic Sirens
- MO COMEDY ACT OF THE YEAR: Keith Scott
- HALL OF FAME AWARD: Russell Morris
- MC / COMPERE OF THE YEAR: Bobby Bradford
- BEST STAND UP COMEDY PERFORMER: Vince Sorrenti
- SLIM DUSTY COUNTRY ACT: Melinda Schneider
- JOHNNY O'KEEFE ENCOURAGEMENT AWARD: Betty Dargie and Susan Jon Rose (Tie)
- BEST ACCOMPANYING BAND: Joe Macri Band
- THE FOUR KINSMEN PRODUCTION/PACKAGE SHOW: Back To The Tivoli
- BEST TECHNICAL SUPPORT: South Sydney Juniors Rugby League Club
- JOHN CAMPBELL FELLOWSHIP AWARD: Ronnie Burns
- SPECIAL ACKNOWLEDGEMENT AWARD: The Artistes Answering Centre
- SPECIAL ACKNOWLEDGEMENT AWARD: Helmut Fisher - Creator of the 'MO' Statuette
- BEST VENUE: South Sydney Juniors Rugby League Club
- BEST ROCK BAND OR PERFORMER: Jon English – The Rock Show
- RICKY MAY MALE VOCAL PERFORMER: Adam Scicluna
- FEMALE VOCAL PERFORMER: Melinda Schneider
- PETER ALLEN PERFORMER OF THE YEAR: Adam Scicluna

=== 2012: 37th Mo Awards ===
The thirty-seventh MO Awards took place on 28 May 2013 at the Bankstown Sports Club. It was compered by Bobby Bradford, Adam Scicluna and Neil Hanson.

- BEST SOLO BAND PERFORMER: Chris Conolly
- BEST DUO: Williams Brothers
- BEST CHILDREN'S SHOW: Franky Valentyn
- BEST HARMONY VOCAL GROUP: The Robertson Brothers
- JOHNNY O'KEEFE ENCOURAGEMENT AWARD: Liam Burrows
- BEST SPECIALTY ACT: Darren Carr
- BEST VERSATILE VARIETY ACT: Danny Elliott
- INTERNATIONAL THEME SHOW / PERFORMER: Joey Fimmano
- BEST VARIETY SHOWBAND: The Zips
- BEST TRIBUTE SHOW: Desperado and Strictly Bassey (Tie)
- BEST DANCE BAND: Rikki Organ & The Organ Grinders
- SLIM DUSTY COUNTRY ACT OF THE YEAR: Wayne Horsburgh
- THE FOUR KINSMEN VARIETY PRODUCTION SHOW: Back To The Tivoli
- MC / COMPERE OF THE YEAR: Elizabeth Star
- RODNEY RUDE STAND UP COMEDIAN OF THE YEAR: Anh Do
- BEST ROCK ACT OF THE YEAR: The Jon English Band
- JOHN CAMPBELL FELLOWSHIP AWARD: Peter Paki
- BEST TECHNICAL SUPPORT: Twin Towns Services Club
- BEST VENUE: Twin Town Services Club
- MO COMEDY ACT OF THE YEAR: Kenny Graham
- TOMMY TYCHO ACCOMPANYING BAND: The Joe Macri Band
- HALL OF FAME: Geoff Mack
- FEMALE VOCAL PERFORMER OF THE YEAR: Alisa Gray
- RICKY MAY MALE VOCAL PERFORMER OF THE YEAR: Tony Pantano
- PETER ALLEN PERFORMER OF THE YEAR: Adam Scicluna

=== 2013: 38th Mo Awards ===
The thirty-eighth MO Awards took place on 27 May 2014 at the Bankstown Sports Club. It was compered by Andrew O'Keefe, John Mangos, Judy Stone and Marcia Hines.

- BEST SOLO BAND PERFORMER: Snowy Robson
- BEST DUO: Take Two
- BEST DANCE/SHOWBAND: The Frocks
- TOMMY TYCHO ACCOMPANYING BAND: Funky Do Da's
- BEST SPECIALTY ACT: Phil Cass
- BEST TRIBUTE SHOW: Roy Orbison Reborn
- BEST VERSATILE VARIETY ACT: Wayne Rogers
- JOHNNY O'KEEFE ENCOURAGEMENT AWARD: Anja Nissen and Rachel Fahim (Tie)
- THE FOUR KINSMEN VARIETY PRODUCTION SHOW: Supreme Motown
- BEST CHILDREN'S SHOW: Brendan Mon Tanner
- BEST VARIETY VOCAL GROUP: Double Exposure
- BEST ROCK BAND/PERFORMER: The Radiators
- INTERNATIONAL THEME SHOW: Peter Paki and The Rhythms of Polynesia
- BEST TECHNICAL SUPPORT: Burwood RSL
- DON LANE COMPERE OF THE YEAR: Terry Mac
- JOHN CAMPBELL FELLOWSHIP AWARD: Carter Edwards
- SLIM DUSTY COUNTRY ACT OF THE YEAR: Benn Gunn
- RODNEY RUDE STAND-UP COMEDIAN OF THE YEAR: Al Showman
- COMEDY ACT OF THE YEAR: Harriet Littlesmith
- BEST VENUE: Campsie RSL
- HALL OF FAME AWARD: Barry Crocker
- JULIE ANTHONY FEMALE VOCAL PERFORMER OF THE YEAR: Kel-Anne Brandt
- RICKY MAY MALE VOCAL PERFORMER OF THE YEAR: Larry Stellar
- PETER ALLEN PERFORMER OF THE YEAR: Phil Cass

=== 2014: 39th Mo Awards ===
The thirty-ninth MO Awards took place on 28 July 2015 at the Canterbury-Hurlstone Park RSL Club. It was compered by Darren Carr, Maria Venuti, Craig Bennet, Helen Zerefos and Vince Sorrenti.

- BEST SOLO PERFORMER: Chris Connolly
- BEST DUO BAND: Aubrey & Martin and Take Two (Tie)
- BEST VARIETY/VOCAL GROUP: Chris Drummond Duo
- BEST DANCE SHOWBAND: Mr James Band
- BEST TRIBUTE SHOW: Tonite's the Night and Sincerely Elvis (Tie)
- JOHNNY O'KEEFE ENCOURAGEMENT AWARD: Brian Lorenz
- BEST CHILDREN'S SHOW: Franky Valentyn and The Party Bears (Tie)
- BEST SPECIALTY ACT: Darren Carr
- BEST VERSATILE VARIETY ACT: Thomas & Moore and Wayne Rogers (Tie)
- BEST INTERNATIONAL THEME SHOW: Peter Paki & The Rhythms of Polynesia
- THE FOUR KINSMEN VARIETY PRODUCTION SHOW: Damn Good Diva's
- DON LANE COMPERE OF THE YEAR: Tony Hogan
- TOMMY TYCHO ACCOMPANYING BAND: Dave Hallard Band
- SLIM DUSTY COUNTRY ACT OF THE YEAR: Melinda Schneider
- JOHN CAMPBELL FELLOWSHIP AWARD: Larry Stellar
- BEST ROCK ACT OF YEAR: Mental As Anything
- BEST VISUAL & AUDIO TECHNICAL SUPPORT: Canterbury-Hurlstone Park RSL
- BEST VENUE: Cabra-Vale Diggers
- RODNEY RUDE BEST STAND-UP COMEDIAN: Gary Who
- MO COMEDY ACT OF THE YEAR: Paul Martell & Darren Carr (Tie)
- HALL OF FAME: Reg Lindsay
- BEST FEMALE VOCAL PERFORMER OF THE YEAR: Lisa Crouch
- RICKY MAY MALE VOCAL PERFORMER OF THE YEAR: Roy Cooper
- PETER ALLEN PERFORMER OF THE YEAR: Darren Carr

=== 2015: 40th Mo Awards ===
The fortieth MO Awards took place on 17 August 2016 at the Canterbury-Hurlstone Park RSL Club. It was compered by Darren Sanders and Darren Carr.

- ACCOMPANYING BAND: Greg Hooper Band
- COMPERE OF THE YEAR: Terry Kaff
- VENUE OF THE YEAR: Hope Estate Hunter Valley
- DANCE SHOW BAND: Mr James Band and Pink Cadillac (Tie)
- JUNIOR AWARD: Bobby Harrison
- JOHNNY O'KEEFE ENCOURAGEMENT AWARD: Sara Mazzurco
- CHILDREN SHOW: The Gigalees Crazy Comedy Show
- VERSATILE VARIETY OR HARMONY ACT: Toni Stevens
- SPECIAL LIFETIME ACHIEVEMENT AWARD: Slim Dusty
- TRIBUTE SHOW: Sincerely Elvis
- DUO ACT: The Happy Hippies
- VARIETY PRODUCTION SHOW: The 3 Gen Show – Warren, Wayne Scott and Alexander (Zan) Kermond
- INTERNATIONAL THEME SHOW: Roddy Montez Show
- COUNTRY FEMALE ACT OF THE YEAR: Jean Stafford
- COUNTRY BAND /GROUP OF THE YEAR: Roadhouse
- COUNTRY MALE ACT OF THE YEAR: Chad Morgan and Col Hardy (Tie)
- SOLO PERFORMER: Chris Bond
- SIGHT ACT OF THE YEAR: HotPot and Aunty Judy
- JOHN CAMPBELL FELLOWSHIP AWARD: Johnny Nicol
- ROCK ACT OF YEAR: The Radiators
- TECHNICAL SUPPORT: Laycock Street Theatre
- RODNEY RUDE BEST STAND-UP COMEDIAN: Jackie Loeb
- MO COMEDY ACT OF THE YEAR: Harriet Littlesmith
- HALL OF FAME: Glenn Shorrock
- FEMALE VOCAL PERFORMER OF THE YEAR: Helen Zerefos
- MALE VOCAL PERFORMER OF THE YEAR: Roy Cooper
- ENTERTAINER OF THE YEAR: The 3 Gen Show

=== 2016: 41st Mo Awards ===
The forty-first MO Awards took place on 20 March 2018 at the Liverpool Catholic Club. It was compered by John Kerr.

- VARIETY ACT OF THE YEAR: Drags to Bitches
- JUNIOR AWARD: Finnian Johnson
- THE MO'S ENCOURAGEMENT AWARDS: Platinum Harmony
- CHILDREN'S SHOW AWARDS: Marty & Emu
- MUSICAL GROUP OF THE YEAR: The Frocks
- COMPERE OF THE YEAR: Roy Cooper
- VENUE OF THE YEAR: Burwood RSL
- SELF CONTAINED ACT OF THE YEAR: Chris Connolly
- HALL OF FAME: The Flanagans
- COMEDY ACT OF THE YEAR: Darren Carr
- PRODUCTION SHOW OF THE YEAR: Wayne Rogers
- COUNTRY SOLO/GROUP/BAND OF THE YEAR: Wayne Horsburgh
- TECHNICAL SUPPORT OF THE YEAR: Burwood RSL
- TRIBUTE SHOW OF THE YEAR: Peter Byrne
- VOCALIST OF THE YEAR: Mark Vincent
- ENTERTAINER OF THE YEAR: Wayne Horsburgh
