= Wickety Wak =

Australian comedy band

- Origin: Brisbane, Queensland
- Genres: comedy, pop, folk, rock
- Years active: 1975–1990, 1997, 2006–2015
- Labels: Hot Wax Records
- Past members: Greg Doolan; Tony Jeffrey; Pahnie Jantzen; Rob Rosenlund; Peter Mackay; Tony Hogan; Peter Smith
- Website: wicketywak.com.au

Wickety Wak were a comedy show band from Queensland, Australia. The band formed in 1975 and were known for their comedic live shows and their work on Australian television. The band split in 1990 and have reformed sporadically from 1997.

== History ==
=== Early years (1975–1990) ===
Prior to Wickety Wak's formation, guitarist Greg Doolan and drummer Peter Mackay had previously been active in numerous Australian pub rock bands, while Irish-born vocalist Tony Jeffrey had once represented Australia at the 1970 Eurovision song contest. After leaving previous band Winston County, Doolan formed Wickety Wak in 1975 with Jeffrey on lead vocals, New Zealand-born bassist Pahnie Jantzen, drummer Peter Smith and keyboardist Tony Hogan. A line-up change followed in 1976, with former Winston County keyboardist Rob Rosenlund replacing Hogan and Mackay replacing Smith on drums.

Wickety Wak's first performances were at the Kuraby Hotel in 1975. The troupe quickly gained notoriety for their variety shows spanning from melodic covers of Louis Armstrong, Willie Nelson, Tom Jones and The Beach Boys, to comedic parodies of Dolly Parton, Cher and Kermit the Frog. Shortly after, the band began playing at Brisbane's National Hotel, pretending to be a touring band from Perth to boost their local profile. In 1978, Wickety Wak became the show band for Jacki MacDonald's morning television show The Jacki Mac Brekkie Show on Brisbane television channel TVQ. Their 1980 debut album Love Me, Love My Dog was a result of the band's appearance on the show.

Throughout the 1980s, Wickety Wak enjoyed a successful period of activity with extensive touring of Australia and the United States and numerous television appearances. They make a number of television specials for BTQ-7.

In 1982, Wickety Wak entered the Australian Charts with their Moonlight Marvel single, followed by albums New Horizons (1983) and Second Helpings (1985). From 1983, Wickety Wak co-produced a series of television specials on BTQ7 titled Wak's Works, and an on-the-road TV special for the Australian Bicentennary called Wak About Australia in 1988. In 1990, Wickety Wak announced their separation with the 11-month "Last Laugh" tour, culminating with a finale show at the Brisbane Entertainment Centre.

After Wickety Wak's breakup, Tony Jeffrey undertook management of several Queensland hotels and performed for numerous local groups. Greg Doolan and Pahnie Jantzen undertook their own solo careers. Jahntzen would occasionally perform Wickety Wak material with Rob Rosenlund and Peter Mackay under the title "Out of Wak". Greg Doolan also continued commercial work, recording jingles for XXXX and Tooheys.

=== Reunions (1997–2015) ===
In 1997, Wickety Wak reformed for a three-month Australian tour, titled "Boys Are Back" and were inducted into the Queensland Hall of Fame that same year. The band reformed again for a performance at the 2006 Gympie Music Muster, with the "Lock Up Your Grandmothers" tour following soon after. The band would tour Australia again in 2009 and 2013. This would be the band's final tour with the full line-up. On 31 March 2013, Wickety Wak bassist and vocalist Pahnie Jantzen died, aged 73.

In 2015, Wickety Wak performed the "Forty Years Young" anniversary concert tour, combining live performance with archived footage of the band to include Pahnie Jantzen's vocals. In 2017, Wickety Wak guitarist and founding member Greg Doolan died following a short battle with cancer, aged 65. Peter Mackay had retired from the band shortly before. Presently, keyboardist Ron Rosenlund and Tony Jeffrey continue to perform Wickety Wak material under the "Outtawak" banner alongside Australian performer Dave "Davo" Mitchell.

== Members ==
- Greg Doolan – guitars and vocals (1975–2015; d. 2017)
- Tony Jeffrey – lead vocals (1975–2015)
- Pahnie Jantzen – bass and vocals (1975–2013; d.2013)
- Rob Rosenlund – keyboards, guitar and vocals (1976–2015)
- Peter Mackay – drums and vocals (1976–2015)

=== Former members ===
- Peter Smith – drums (1975–1976)
- Tony Hogan – keyboards (1975–1976)

== Discography ==
=== Studio albums ===
List of albums, with selected details and chart positions
Title	Album details	Peak chart positions
Title	Album details	AUS
Love Me Love My Dog (with Jacki Mac)	Released: 1980; Format: LP, Cassette; Label: EMI (YPRX-1627)	—
New Horizons	Released: 1983; Format: LP, cassette; Label: Hot Wax (WAX-200)	69
Second Helpings	Released: 1985; Format: LP, cassette; Label: Hot Wax (WAX 201)	73
Wak About Australia	Released: 1988; Format: LP, cassette, CD; Label: Hot Wax (WAX 202)	—

=== Live albums ===
Title	Album details
Wak's Last Laugh	Released: 1990; Format: Cassette
Live at Rumours Toowoomba	Released: 2007; Format: CD

=== Singles ===
List of singles, with selected chart positions
Year	Title	Peak chart positions
Year	Title	AUS
1982	"Moonlight Marvel"	—
1982	"Give the Children a Chance"/"Queensland Medley"	74
1983	"Christmas Needs Love"	—
1983	"Girl on My Street"	—
1983	"You'll Never Get Away with It"	—
1985	"Everlasting Love"	—
1985	"Bend Me Shape Me"	—

== Television Specials ==
- Waks Works (1984)
- Waks Works II (1985)
- Waks Works III (1986)
- Pop Goes the Wak (1987)
- Wak About Australia (1988)

== Awards ==
=== Mo Awards ===
The Australian Entertainment Mo Awards (commonly known informally as the Mo Awards), were annual Australian entertainment industry awards. They recognise achievements in live entertainment in Australia from 1975 to 2016. Wickety Wak won five awards in that time.

Year	Nominee / work	Award	Result (wins only)
1983	Wickety Wak Showgroup	Instrumental / Vocal of the Year	Won
1984	Wickety Wak Showgroup	Instrumental / Vocal of the Year	Won
1986	Wickety Wak	Showgroup of the Year	Won
1987	Wickety Wak	Most Outstanding Showgroup of the Year	Won
1989	Wickety Wak	Comedy Group of the Year	Won
