= The Four Kinsmen =

Australian vocal group

- Origin: Victoria, Australia
- Genres: Rock
- Years active: 1962–2009
- Label: His Master's Voice
- Past members: Bernard Mahony; Adrian Mahoney; Peter Fay; George Fay; Spencer Whiteley; Robert Pearson; Allan Morrison; George Harvey; Graham Wilson; Scott Radburn

The Four Kinsmen were an Australian vocal group formed in 1962 and become stalwarts of Australia's live performance circuit in the later part of the twentieth century and hold the record for the most Mo Awards wins.

== History ==
In 1962, Bernard and Adrian Mahony joined with brothers Peter and George Fay to form The Four Kinsmen. Their first TV appearance was on the Kevin Dennis Auditions in July 1963. After appearing on the show multiple times, they went on to win and were given a spot-on Graham Kennedy's In Melbourne Tonight.

In 1964 they released their first single, "The Sphinx Won’t Tell"/"The Last Leaf", recorded at Television City in Melbourne, it reached number 10 on the Melbourne 3DB chart.

More success followed before the group decided to leave for England and were given a three-month season with Dave Allen at a theatre restaurant. Whilst in England, the group worked with Engelbert Humperdinck, Des O'Connor, Val Doonican, Benny Hill and Morecambe and Wise. While in England they released three singles and they did a pantomime season along with the New Vaudeville Band.

In 1968 the group returned to Australia and gaining work on the club scene in Sydney.

In 1975 they won their first Mo Award. By 1976, Bernard Mahony left the group and was replaced by Spencer Whiteley. Bernard Mahoney died in 1978. In 1980 Peter Fay left and he was replaced by Alan Morrison who was soon replaced by George Harvey. In 1982, Spencer Whiteley left and was replaced by Robert Pearson. Adrian Mahony left and was replaced by Graham Wilson. In 1986 the last original member George Fay left and was replaced by Scott Radburn.

George Fay died from motor neurone disease, shortly after.

The Four Kinsmen carried on touring around the world until 2009.

A documentary about the group is scheduled for an Australian debut in late 2022.

== Discography ==
=== Albums ===
List of albums with selected details
| Title | Details |
|---|---|
| The Four Kinsmen | Released: 1971; Label: His Master's Voice (OCSD 7681); Format: Vinyl |
| Our Own Kind of Music | Released: 1972; Label: His Master's Voice (SOELP 9930); Format: Vinyl |
| Live & Well | Released: 1974; Label: His Master's Voice (SOELP 10183); Format: Vinyl |
| The Very Best of The Four Kinsmen | Released: 1976; Label: Axis (AXIS-6279); Format: Vinyl |
| Two Sides of the Four Kinsmen | Released: 1983; Label: TFK Productions (YPRX-2116); Format: Vinyl, cassette |
| The Four Kinsmen | Released: 1991; Label: Springbrook (DEX 262 CDE); Format: CD, cassette |

== Awards ==
=== Mo Awards ===
The Australian Entertainment Mo Awards (commonly known informally as the Mo Awards), were annual Australian entertainment industry awards. They recognise achievements in live entertainment in Australia from 1975 to 2016. They won 25 awards in that time.

| Year | Nominee / work | Award | Result (wins only) |
|---|---|---|---|
| 1975 | Themselves | Vocal Group of the Year | Won |
| 1975 | Themselves | Act of the Year | Won |
| 1976 | Themselves | Best Vocal Group of the Year | Won |
| 1977 | Themselves | Vocal Group (3 of More) of the Year | Won |
| 1978 | Themselves | Vocal Group (2 of More) of the Year | Won |
| 1978 | Themselves | Vocal Group (2 of More) of the Year | Won |
| 1981 | Themselves | Vocal Group of the Year | Won |
| 1981 | Themselves | Vocal Group of the Year | Won |
| 1985 | Themselves | Vocal Group (2 of More) of the Year | Won |
| 1986 | Themselves | Vocal Group (2 of More) of the Year | Won |
| 1986 | Themselves | Daily Telegraph Readers Award - Group of the Year | Won |
| 1987 | Themselves | Vocal Group (2 of More) of the Year | Won |
| 1988 | Themselves | Best Group of the Year | Won |
| 1989 | Themselves | Cabaret Group of the Year | Won |
| 1991 | Themselves | Variety Performer of the Year | Won |
| 1991 | Themselves | Variety Group of the Year | Won |
| 1992 | Themselves | Variety Performer of the Year | Won |
| 1992 | Themselves | Variety Group of the Year | Won |
| 1993 | Themselves | Variety Performer of the Year | Won |
| 1993 | Themselves | Variety Group of the Year | Won |
| 1995 | Themselves | Variety Performer of the Year | Won |
| 1995 | Themselves | Variety Group of the Year | Won |
| 1996 | Themselves | Variety Group of the Year | Won |
| 1997 | Themselves | Variety Group of the Year | Won |
| 1998 | Themselves | Variety Group of the Year | Won |
