= Studio A (1963 TV series) =

- Genre: Variety
- Presented by: The LeGarde Twins; Terry O'Neill; Stuart Wagstaff
- Country of origin: Australia
- Original language: English

Original release
- Network: ATN-7
- Release: 26 September 1963 – 1964

Studio A is an Australian television series which aired from 26 September 1963 to 1964 on what would eventually become the Seven Network. A variety series, hosts during the run of the series included the Le Garde twins, Terry O'Neill, and Stuart Wagstaff. It featured music and comedy.

Several episodes of the program are held by the National Film and Sound Archive.
