= Benn Gunn =

Australian country performer

Benn Gunn is an Australian country performer who plays "Aussie Heartland Rock". He has played most major country music festivals across Australia and charted multiple singles including the Country Songs Top 40 number-one hits "Girls Like Guys with Trucks", "Only in Australia" and "Luckiest Man Alive".

Gunn released his first album Keep on Drivin in 2011 and the singles "Every Minute I Wait", "Rawsonville Road" and "I Like Girls That Drink Beer". In 2012 "Rawsonville Road" and "I Like Girls That Drink Beer" both made the top 10 of the Country Songs Top 40 chart. "Rawsonville Road" was also a CMC Country Pick.

In 2015 Gunn released the album Ain't Nothing But a Party including the comedic single "Girls Like Guys with Trucks", which became a three-week number-one hit on the Country Songs Top 40 chart. The single also ranked third in the top 40 country singles for the entire year of 2015.

In 2016 Gunn released his single Heavensville with the music video shot with spectacular scenery from the coastal town of Kiama where he currently lives. The video was partly funded by the Kiama Council.

In 2017 Gunn released the single "I'm a Queenslander" to help raise donations for the communities affected by Cyclone Debbie.

In 2018 Gunn released his Only in Australia album. The cover of the album was a tribute to the DJs and radio programmers across Australia who support Australian music; the cover is made from a collage of their photos, each taken in their local area. The title track off the Only in Australia album reached number one in December 2018 and after 33 weeks broke the record for the longest run on the Country Songs Top 40 chart. The single also ranked second on the year end country radio charts for 2019

Three more singles from the Only in Australia album were released in 2019, "We Can Be Mates", "I Got the Boat" and "Luckiest Man Alive". All charted on the Country Songs Top 40. "Luckiest Man Alive" charted at #9 on 21 December just one week after release.

In 2019 Gunn also released his State of Origin song "We're from New South Wales" along with a re-release of what has become the Queensland State of Origin anthem, "I'm a Queenslander".

On 14 March 2020, Benn Gunn's single released in 2019 "Luckiest Man Alive" reached number one on the Australian Country Songs Top 40. The single also ranked second on the year end country radio charts for 2020.

In 2021 Benn Gunn's tribute single to ANZACs and Australian firefighters "Born & Bred" reached #15 on the Australian Country Songs Top 40.

In 2022 Benn Gunn released the single "A Bit More Aussie" which reached #6 on the Australian Country Songs Top 40 and launched his live music tour "The Great Australian Show : Benn Gunn's rocking tribute to Aussie Kulcha" helping raise money for 100 regional charities across Australia. In 2022 Gunn also released the single "Down Highway One" which reached #6 on the Australian Country Songs Top 40.

Benn Gunn is also known for his unofficial mash-up videos with his videos amassing millions of views.

== Awards ==
=== Mo Awards ===
The Australian Entertainment Mo Awards (commonly known informally as the Mo Awards), were annual Australian entertainment industry awards. They recognise achievements in live entertainment in Australia from 1975 to 2016. Benn Gunn won one awards in that time.

Year	Nominee / work	Award	Result (wins only)
2013	Benn Gunn	Country Act of the Year	Won
