= The LeGarde Twins =

Australian country music vocal duo

- Also known as: Australia's Yodeling Stockmen
- Origin: Mackay, Queensland, Australia
- Genres: Country, folk
- Years active: 1950–2021
- Labels: Regal Zonophone Records, American Heritage Records, Festival Records, Super Productions
- Formerly of: Faron Young
- Past members: Tom LaGarde; Ted LaGarde

Tom LeGarde and Ted LeGarde, known professionally as the LeGarde Twins, were an Australian country music duo of vocalists and identical brothers, both born on 15 March 1931 in Mackay, Queensland. Ted LeGarde died on 1 August 2018, at age 87. Tom LeGarde died on 30 July 2021, at age 90.

== Career ==
The twins left home at the age of 15 and after trying their luck on the rodeo circuit as cowboys, they began playing music (they both sing and play guitar) and performed throughout Australia (with the nickname "Australia's Yodeling Stockmen"). They were signed to the Rodeo label from 1950 to 1952, after which they released a string of hits in the 1950s on Regal Zonophone Records. In 1957, they left for North America, initially for Canada (they had acknowledged Canadian country singer Wilf Carter, or "Montana Slim", as an influence); they were even rumored to get their own TV show on the Canadian channel CTV. Soon, however, they left for Hollywood, performed on Doye O'Dell's Western Varieties TV shows, and hosted a TV show on KTLA in Los Angeles, before settling down in Nashville. In the 1970s they were touring the United States, part of a revival of interest in the music of the old western movies. In 1972, they signed with American Heritage Records, and in 1980 with the Australian label Festival Records.

In later years, they opened up the LeGarde Twins Country Music Theatre in Twitty City, in Hendersonville, Tennessee; after the death of Conway Twitty, they moved the theatre to the Quality Inn Hall of Fame Hotel in Nashville. They were still active in the first decade of the 21st century, playing in the Nashville Palace in 2007, at the Williamsburg Film Festival in 2008, and at a festival in Franklin, North Carolina in 2008; in 2009 they played with Tommy Cash in Corydon, Indiana.

== Film and television appearances ==
On 10 February 1958, The LeGarde Twins appeared on the radio and television program "You Bet Your Life" with Groucho Marx. They said the secret word "People" and won $100. They won a further $100 on a consolation question after failing to get four questions correct in the quiz. This appearance was later released on an album of original radio broadcasts.

Both Ted and Tom were regulars on the 1963 TV show Network. In 1967 they appeared on Star Trek: The Original Series in the episode titled, "I, Mudd". In 1968 and 1969 they appeared on Laugh-In, season 2, episodes 13 and 14, as the disastrous circus act, "Brothers LeGarde". In 2009, Ted played the "Old Man Dalton" character in the movie D4, an action-thriller directed by Darrin Dickerson.

== Discography ==
=== Singles ===
- "I Can Almost Touch The Feeling" became their top hit on the Billboard Top 100 Charts (Four Star Records)(1979)"In The Jail House Now" / "As Long As I Live" (Regal Zonophone 10-inch 78 rpm G25401 - date ??)
- "Daddy's Makin' Records in Nashville / Grady Family Band" (Invitation 101, 19??)
- "Roll, Rock 'n' Roll That Hula Hoop / HiDi (instrumental)", with Earl Palmer & The Hoopers (Belcanto 45-BC-725, October 1958)
- "Baby Sitter / Where Can The Lovelight Be" (Liberty F-55266, November 1960)
- "A Donut and A Dream / Striped Circles" (American Heritage Music Corporation AH-401-39, April 1972)

=== Albums ===
- Brand New
- Songs of the West
- Ballads of the Bushlands
- One Little Letter
- Down Under Country (1981, Festival)
