= Live at Fez, New York 2004 =

Live album by Frente!
- Released: 2014
- Recorded: Fez, New York City, 2004
- Genres: Alternative rock, Acoustic music, Indie rock, Indie Pop
- Label: Frente!
- Producer: Frente!

Frente! chronology
Shape (1996)	Live at Fez, New York 2004 (2014)

Live at Fez, New York 2004 is the first live album by Australian alternative rock group Frente!. It was recorded in New York City in 2004 The album was released as a download in 2014 to pledgers of Frente!'s pledgemusic campaign to re-release a remastered Marvin the Album (21st Anniversary Edition). It was self-released and unable to chart.

== Background ==
Frente! were formed in Melbourne in 1989 and during the 1990s released two studio albums, four extended plays and a number of singles, including the platinum selling "Accidently Kelly Street". At the ARIA Music Awards of 1993 the group won two ARIA Awards; ARIA Award for Breakthrough Artist – Album and ARIA Award for Breakthrough Artist – Single. The band split in 1997.

In late 2003 Frente! founders Simon Austin and Angie Hart, were both living in the US and resumed song writing together. The band performed a number of acoustic shows in New York City and Los Angeles in 2004.

== Track listing ==
1. "Goodbye Goodguy"
2. "Dangerous"
3. "Lonely"
4. "Most Beautiful"
5. "Horrible"
6. "Air"
7. "Labour Of Love"
8. "Sit on My Hands"
9. "Cuscatlan"
10. "Paper, Bullets and Walls"
11. "Clue"
12. "Burning Girl"
13. "Oh Brilliance" / "Risk"
14. "Jungle"
15. "Love and Terror"
16. "Safe from You"
17. "Ordinary Angels"
18. "Bizarre Love Triangle"
19. "Somethin' Stupid"
20. "Accidently Kelly Street"
