= Whirled (EP) =

- blue cover

EP by Frente!
- Released: August 1991
- Recorded: 1991
- Genre: Alternative rock, acoustic
- Label: Thumprint Records
- Producer: Frente!

Frente! chronology
Whirled (1991)	Clunk (1992)

Whirled is the debut extended play by Australian alternative rock group Frente!. It was released in August 1991, and was released in 6 different coloured covers: brown, black, blue, gold, pink and yellow.

== Background and release ==
Frente! were formed in Melbourne, as "Frente", in 1989 by Simon Austin on guitar and backing vocals, Angie Hart on lead vocals, Tim O'Connor on bass guitar, and Mark Picton on drums and recorder. The band spent two years performing in Melbourne's inner-city venues before, in August 1991, issuing their self-funded debut extended play, Whirled, on the Thumb Print label. It was produced and engineered by Owen Bolwell at Whirled Records in Richmond. Hart explained that the exclamation mark was added for the CD's cover art "[w]e don't write our name like that, but we thought we would on the CD covers because it looks good". One of Whirled's eight tracks, "Labour of Love", was voted by Triple J listeners to No. 69 on their Hottest 100 for 1991.

== Track listing ==
1. "Love and Terror" - 1:23
2. "Oh Brilliance" - 1:59
3. "Last to Know" - 1:17
4. "Labour of Love" - 3:10
5. "Risk" - 0:28
6. "Baby Blue Sycophant" - 2:50
7. "Testimony" - 1:27
8. "Discipline and Deep Water" - 3:05

== Personnel ==
- Bass – Tim O'Connor
- Drums, Recorder – Mark Picton
- Engineer, Producer – Owen Bolwell
- Guitar, Vocals – Simon Austin
- Harmonica – Chris Wilson
- Mastered By – Malcolm Dennis
- Photography [Cover] – Amanda Dalgleish
- Violin – Jane Schleiger
- Vocals – Angie Hart
- Written-By – Hart, Picton, Austin, O'Connor
