= Company of Strangers =

Company of Strangers may refer to:

- Company of Strangers (group) Australian supergroup (1992–1993)
  - Company of Strangers (Company of Strangers album), 1993
- Company of Strangers (Bad Company album), 1995
- Company of Strangers (Colin Hay album), 2002
- The Company of Strangers, 1990 Canadian film
