= Clunk =

Clunk may refer to:

- Clunk (EP), 1992 EP by Australian alternative rock group Frente!
- Josiah Clunk, a fictional detective in works of H. C. Bailey
- Clunk, a character from the British cartoon series Robozuna

== See also ==
- Clunker (disambiguation)
