= Motor City (disambiguation) =

Motor City is a nickname for Detroit, Michigan, United States.

Motor City may also refer to:

- Oshawa, Ontario

== Geography ==
- Motor City, California
- Dubai Motor City

== Arts, entertainment, media and music ==
- Motor City Online, an online game released by Electronic Arts
- Motor City Patrol, a line of video games published by Matchbox
- Motorcity, an animated TV series on Disney XD
- "Motor City (I Get Lost)", a song by Australian group Company of Strangers
- MC5, one of the most iconic rock band from Detroit. The name is a short for "Motor City Five" based on their Detroit roots
- Motor City (film), a 2025 American action thriller film

== Business ==
- MotorCity Casino, a casino in Detroit

== Sports ==
- The Motor City Machine Guns, a professional wrestling tag team
- Motor City Cruise, NBA G league team
