= 1993 ARIA Music Awards =

Annual Australian music awards

- Date: 14 April 1993
- Venue: Sydney Entertainment Centre, Sydney, New South Wales

Highlights
- Most wins: Wendy Matthews (3)
- Most nominations: Diesel (6)
- Website: ariaawards.com.au

Television/radio coverage
- Network: Network Ten

The Seventh Australian Recording Industry Association Music Awards (generally known as the ARIA Music Awards or simply the ARIAs) was held on 14 April 1993 at the Entertainment Centre in Sydney. Host, Richard Wilkins, was assisted by presenters, James Reyne, Elle Macpherson, Billy Birmingham, Tim Finn, Neil Finn, Daryl Somers and others, to distribute 24 awards. There were live performances and the awards were televised.

In addition to previous categories, a Special Achievement Award was presented to former Countdown host and music commentator Molly Meldrum who provided one of the longest acceptance speeches in ARIA history. The ARIA Hall of Fame inducted: Peter Allen and Cold Chisel.

== Ceremony details ==
Former Countdown host and music commentator Molly Meldrum provided one of the longest speeches in ARIA history upon accepting his Special Achievement Award. At the 1991 ceremony Gary Morris, manager for Midnight Oil, had provided a 20-minute acceptance speech. Meldrum had publicly disapproved of Morris' speech both its content and excessive length—they had also had a shouting match at the ARIAs in 1988. Music journalist, Anthony O'Grady, described Meldrum's 1993 speech, "[he] reeled off some 50 names starting with Ronnie Burns and Ronnie's Aunt Edna [Edna is Burns' mother], ending with a dedication to his adopted son Morgan. The speech contained a classic line describing his time as a mimer in Kommotion: 'I can't mime and I can't talk properly yet'."

=== Presenters and performers ===
The ARIA Awards ceremony was hosted by TV personality Richard Wilkins. Presenters and performers were:

Presenter(s)	Performer(s)	Ref.
Angry Anderson	Peter Andre, Sound Unlimited, Def FX	
Billy Birmingham	Peter Andre, Sound Unlimited, Def FX	
James Blundell, Dale Ryder	Jimmy Barnes	
Kate Ceberano, Jon Stevens	Jimmy Barnes	
D Generation	Kate Ceberano, Andrew Pendlebury, Weddings Parties Anything, the Black Sorrows	
David Dixon, Toni Pearen	Crowded House	
Jon English, Steven Jacobs	Frente!	
Tim Finn, Neil Finn	Frente!	
Paul Hester	Hunters & Collectors	
Deni Hines	Hunters & Collectors	
Elle Macpherson, James Reyne	INXS	
Jenny Morris, Michael Hutchence	Rick Price	
Daryl Somers	Rick Price	

== Awards ==
Nominees for most awards are shown, in plain, with winners in bold.

=== ARIA Awards ===
- Album of the Year
  - **Diesel – Hepfidelity**
    - Hunters & Collectors – Cut
    - Ed Kuepper – Black Ticket Day
    - Wendy Matthews – Lily
    - Rockmelons – Form 1 Planet
- Single of the Year
  - **Wendy Matthews – "The Day You Went Away"**
    - Baby Animals – "One Word"
    - Crowded House – "Weather with You"
    - Diesel – "Tip of My Tongue"
    - Weddings Parties Anything – "Father's Day"
- Highest Selling Album
  - **Australian Cast Recording – Jesus Christ Superstar**
    - Diesel – Hepfidelity
    - Rockmelons – Form 1 Planet
    - Noiseworks – Greatest Hits
    - Wendy Matthews – Lily
    - Hoodoo Gurus – Electric Soup/Gorilla Biscuit
- Highest Selling Single
  - **Wendy Matthews – "The Day You Went Away"**
    - Euphoria – "One in a Million"
    - John Paul Young – "Love Is in the Air"
    - Frente! – "Accidently Kelly Street"
    - Girlfriend – "Take It From Me"
    - Kate Ceberano, Jon Stevens, John Farnham (cast of Jesus Christ Superstar) – "Everything's Alright"
- Best Group
  - **Crowded House – "Weather with You"**
    - Baby Animals – "One Word"
    - The Black Sorrows – Better Times
    - The Cruel Sea – This Is Not the Way Home
    - INXS – Welcome to Wherever You Are
- Best Female Artist
  - **Wendy Matthews – Lily**
    - Kate Ceberano – "I Don't Know How to Love Him"
    - Deborah Conway – "Release Me"
    - Deni Hines – "That Word (L.O.V.E.)"
    - Margaret Urlich – Chameleon Dreams
- Best Male Artist
  - **Diesel – Hepfidelity**
    - Jimmy Barnes – "Ain't No Mountain High Enough"
    - Paul Kelly – Paul Kelly Live
    - Jon Stevens – "Superstar"
    - Chris Wilson – Landlocked
- Best New Talent
  - **Things of Stone and Wood – Share This Wine**
    - Caligula – Caligula (EP)
    - Girlfriend – Make It Come True
    - Rick Price – "Not a Day Goes By"
    - Tiddas – Inside My Kitchen
- Breakthrough Artist – Album
  - **Frente! – Marvin the Album**
    - Company of Strangers – Company of Strangers
    - The Dukes – Harbour City
    - Rick Price – Heaven Knows
    - Chris Wilson – Landlocked
- Breakthrough Artist – Single
  - **Frente! – "Ordinary Angels"**
    - Company of Strangers – "Motor City (I Get Lost)"
    - Rick Price – "Not a Day Goes By"
    - The Sharp – Talking Sly (EP)
    - Things of Stone and Wood – "Share This Wine"
- Best Country Album
  - **Lee Kernaghan – The Outback Club**
    - James Blundell – This Road
    - Colin Buchanan – Hard Times
    - Keith Urban & Slim Dusty – "Lights on the Hill"
    - Brent Parlane – Brent Parlane
- Best Independent Release
  - **Ed Kuepper – Black Ticket Day**
    - The Jackson Code – Strange Cargo
    - Def FX – Blink (EP)
    - Melanie Oxley & Chris Abrahams – Welcome to Violet
    - TISM – Beasts of Suburban
- Best Indigenous Release
  - **Yothu Yindi – "Djäpana (Sunset Dreaming)"**
    - Kev Carmody – Street Beat
    - Coloured Stone – Inma Juju
    - Gondwanaland – Wide Skies
    - Tiddas – Inside My Kitchen
- Best Adult Contemporary Album
  - **Andrew Pendlebury** – **Don't Hold Back That Feeling**
    - Marina Prior – Aspects of Andrew Lloyd Webber
    - Various – Stairways to Heaven
    - Various – Strictly Ballroom
    - Anthony Warlow – On the Boards
- Best Comedy Release
  - **Various – Stairways to Heaven**
    - The 12th Man – Still the 12th Man
    - Agro – Agro Kids Dance Album
    - Andrew Denton & the Cast of Live & Sweaty – "I Don't Care As Long As We Beat New Zealand"
    - Norman Gunston featuring Effie – "Amigos Para Siempre"/"Venereal Girl (Tribute to Madonna)"

=== Fine Arts Awards ===
- Best Jazz Album
  - **Bernie McGann – Ugly Beauty**
    - Judy Bailey – Notwithstanding
    - Paul Grabowsky – Tee Vee
    - Vince Jones – Future Girl
    - James Morrison & Ray Brown – Two the Max!
- Best Classical Album
  - **Australian Chamber Orchestra & Richard Tognetti – Janáček: Kreutzer Sonata for Strings, Barber: Adagio for Strings, Walton: Sonata for Strings**
    - The Brandenburg Orchestra – The Brandenburg Orchestra
    - West Australian Symphony Orchestra – The Transposed Heads
    - Geoffrey Lancaster – Mozart Sonatas for Fortepiano
    - Roger Woodward – The Music of Frédéric Chopin
- Best Children's Album
  - **ABC Symphony Orchestra – Classic Kids**
    - Franciscus Henri – Walking on the Milky Way
    - Mike Jackson – Rufty Tufty
    - George Spartels – George from Play School
    - The Tin Lids – Snakes & Ladders
- Best Original Soundtrack / Cast / Show Recording
  - **John Clifford White – Romper Stomper**
    - Australian Cast Recording – Jesus Christ Superstar
    - Ricky Fataar & Others – Spotswood
    - Paul Grabowsky – The Last Days of Chez Nous
    - Various – Strictly Ballroom
    - Nigel Westlake – Antarctica

=== Artisan Awards ===
- Song of the Year
  - **Mick Thomas – "Father's Day" – Weddings Parties Anything**
    - Suze De Marchi (co-writer) – "One Word" – Baby Animals
    - Diesel (co-writer) – "Tip of My Tongue" – Diesel
    - Neil Finn, Tim Finn – "Weather With You" – Crowded House
    - Bryan Jones, Jonathan Jones, Raymond Medhurst (co-writers) – "That Word (L.O.V.E.)" – Rockmelons featuring Deni Hines
- Producer of the Year
  - **Simon Hussey** – **Daryl Braithwaite** – **"Nothing to Lose"**, **Company of Strangers** – **"Daddy's Gonna Make You a Star"**, **"Motor City (I Get Lost)"**, **"Sweet Love"**
    - David Hirschfelder – John Farnham, Kate Ceberano, Jon Stevens – "Everything's Alright", Kate Ceberano – "I Don't Know How to Love Him"
    - Joe Camilleri – Black Sorrows – "Ain't Love the Strangest Thing", "Better Times", "Come on, Come On" – The Revelators – "Caribbean Wind"
    - Rockmelons – "Form one Planet", "It's not Over"
    - Tony Cohen – The Cruel Sea – This Is Not the Way Home, TISM – "Get Thee to a Nunnery"
- Engineer of the Year
  - **Greg Henderson – Yothu Yindi – "Dharpa", "Tribal Voice"**
    - Adrian Bolland – Margaret Urlich – "Boy in the Moon", "Cover to Cover"; – Teen Queens – "Can't Help Myself", "Love How You Love Me"
    - Doug Brady – 1927 – "Scars"; – Eve – "What a Lover"; – Lisa Edwards – "Cry", "So Dangerous"
    - Doug Roberts – Stephen Cummings – "Keep the Ball Rolling"
    - Niven Garland – INXS – "Baby Don't Cry", "Heaven Sent", "Taste It"
- Best Video
  - **Stephen Johnson – Yothu Yindi – "Djäpana"**
    - Robbie Douglas-Turner – Frente! – "Ordinary Angels"
    - Paul Elliott – Boom Crash Opera – "Bettadaze"
    - Paul Goldman – Lisa Edwards – "Cry"
    - Chris Langman – The Sharp – Talking Sly (EP)
- Best Cover Art
  - **Paul McNeil, Richard All – Hoodoo Gurus – Electric Soup / Gorilla Biscuit**
    - Angie Hart, Louise Beach – Frente! – Marvin the Album
    - Ian Martin, Adrienne Overall – Diesel – Hepfidelity
    - Midnight Oil, Neo One Design – Midnight Oil – Scream in Blue
    - Pascoe & Gray Design, Eryk Photography – The Black Sorrows – Better Times

== Special Achievement Award ==
- Ian "Molly" Meldrum

== ARIA Hall of Fame inductees ==
The Hall of Fame inductees were:

- Peter Allen
- Cold Chisel
