= Crossing the Railroad =

Crossing The Railroad

Studio album by Wonderbra
- Released: May 3, 2007
- Recorded: February–March, 2007
- Studio: Liquid Studio, Depok
- Genre: Alternative rock, punk, Rock and Roll, Psychedelic, Blues
- Length: 32:00
- Label: LIMI Records
- Producer: Harry Sihombing & Ricky Benito Siahaan

Wonderbra chronology
| Crossing The Railroad (2007) | #fiksifriksi (2011) |

Singles from Crossing The Railroad
- 1. "Hell's Kitchen" Released: May 3, 2007

Crossing the Railroad is the debut album by Indonesian rock band Wonderbra, released on May 3, 2007, by Liquid Records through LIMI labels. All songs were written and arranged by Teraya Paramehta, Nosa Normanda, Asep Rachman Muchlas and Edy Sembodo with additional players such as Yuda Wahyudin in guitar and Rizki Mustafa Arisun in keyboards. The album was produced from a series of coincidence. At first the newly formed band was rehearsing in Liquid studio in 2005. They performed some of their own songs from jamming session such as "Die Die Baby, Die!", a punk song, and "Ordinary Orgasm" (unreleased). Harry Sihombing, the owner of the studio, along with Ricky Benito Siahaan watched the band performed and offered them a recording deal. Without further hesitation the band gladly accepted the offer.

== Background ==
When first established in 2005, Wonderbra had no idea that they would record an album. They were just students in University of Indonesia trying to filled time outside classes. They usually played cover songs by Swedish band The Cardigans or Australian band Frente!. They started to jam in Liquid studio and wrote their first jam session song, "Die Die, Baby, Die!", which was eventually become their main song to auditioned in music festivals. It turns out, combining Punk and Rock and Roll with a female Jazz vocalist was something quite unique at that time.

They continued to have jam sessions in Liquid studio and decided to make a demo of two songs: "Die Die, Baby, Die!" and "Ordinary Orgasm." During those recording, the owner of the studio, Harry Sihombing and his colleague Ricky Benito Siahaan saw them and decided to offer them a record deal. Wonderbra accepted the deal and music became seriously fun. They did not only find their path in musical genre, but also to the indie music industry of Indonesia. Too bad, one of their guitarist, Arya, resigned due to his inability to fulfill commitment that can ruin his academic. Therefore, for the recording, Asep brought in an additional player to replace Arya, Yuda "Kuyut" Wahyudin.

== Recording and composition ==
Harry and Ricky produced the record in three weeks. First they asked the band to record all their materials, live. Wonderbra already had 11 songs, and they recorded them in two sessions. After that, the two producers picked 8 songs for the album. They excluded three songs which were "Loveless Blues," "Indie V," and "Ordinary Orgasm." Then they started the studio recording session.

Because none of the players were educated musically, they started to record guides based on memory and the live recording previously made. Nosa and Kuyut recorded the guide. Then for nearly five days, Edy Sembodo filled in all the drums. Being an autodidactic drummer and a first time recording musician, Edy had a hard time in following the metronome. Ricky, one of the producers, was a professional drummer. So before the recording, he teach Edy basic drumming technics. The result was not bad for a starter—although the sound engineer still needed to work hard to perfect the tempo.

Asep Rachman filled the bass-line with a lot of references from the Japanese band L'Arc-en-Ciel's and Nirvana's Krist Novoselic. Nosa take a lot of references from Jimi Hendrix, Nirvana's Kurt Cobain, The Doors and Led Zeppelin's Jimmy Page to filled in lead guitar and most of the songs' base. Kuyut was already well known in the local scene as a Brit Pop guitarist. He perfected the album with his eclectic style, which make the structure of the songs to be neat.

Lastly, Tera filled in the vocal. One thing that they never had suspected was that Tera's high pitched voice was actually too high the technology that time. Even when the microphone was a good quality one, and Tera had tried so hard to keep a proper distance during the recording, her vocal still off peak every time the songs got intensified. So she had to hold her vocal a little bit. In Crossing the Railroad album she put a lot of influence from Aretha Franklin, Janis Joplin and Alanis Morissette.

The producers took care all of the sound arrangements. They even choose the amplifier and instrument's effects for each songs. The personnel accepted this decision because the lack of musical knowledge and lack of hardware resources to personally choose the sounds. Nevertheless, in between these limitations, the rawness of the album was still something to be proud of. The mixing session were finished by Harry, Ricky and Arief Wicaksono.

All lyrics in Crossing the Railroad were written by Tera. Some of them are semi-autobiographical and talked about living dangerously in Indonesia, such as "Midnight Song", "Hell's Kitchen" and "Crossing the Railroad." Some others are tribute songs such as "Ode (to Lady Janis)", a tribute to Janis Joplin, and "Obituary," a tribute to Nietzsche.

== Packaging ==
Crossing the Railroad was chosen as an album title because two things. First, the lyric were inspired by Nosa's struggle to overcome breaking up with his old girlfriend—while during the process of the album, Tera and Asep also have to deal with breaking up with each of their spouse. Being broken hearted was the first ingredients of this album. Second, as a students in University of Indonesia in 2005, every day the band members should cross the dangerous railroad to go to campus. There was a chance to get hit by a train every single day. Crossing the Railroad became the most suitable representation for the band.

Nosa and Kuyut walked from station to station to take pictures of the railroads and the Indonesians commuters. That time, the train was not very safe. Most of them had no doors and people can sit on its roof during commuting. Then Nosa made the layout from the pictures and it became their album sleeve. During the making of this packaging, Kuyut was offer to be an official member of the band if he was to write a "thanks to" note. He accepted the offer.

== Release and reception ==
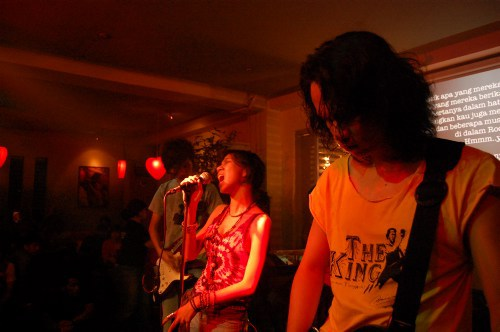
Tera and Nosa in Crossing the Railroad launching party, Colours Cafe. May 3, 2007.

On May 3, 2007, the two managers of the band, Risyiana Meuthia and Erik Cahyanta, managed to get sponsors and created a launching party at Colours Cafe, Jakarta. The show was open by some of the most famous bands in Jakarta Indie Scene at that time, such as Stupid Robotic Killing Machine, Afamous, Zeke and the Popo, and an unexpected guest Gugun Blues Shelter. The show hit a great success due to the involvement of the internal manager, music writer Manan Rasudi, and Wardrobe Designer, Andwi.

The Indie scene of Jakarta in 2007 were mostly underground music lovers. Indie bands at that time were famous from mouth to mouth, but never really occur in mainstream media. Internet were just started to boom in Indonesia, and the usage were limited in big cities. Therefore, the critical reception of Indie Band, can only be traced via early social media such as Friendster, or early blogging such as My Space, Blogspot or Wordpress. In these alternative media, the reception of the album was not bad at all. Nuran Wibisono, a journalist who's also a former blogger wrote in 2007, "Yesterday I performed Wonderbra's Hell Kitchen. Such a cool song.". Felix Dass, a writer from The Jakarta Post, wrote in his Myspace, "This is one dangerous band. Find their album."

== Commercial dispute ==
Two years after its release, Wonderbra had not got any profits from the album selling and ring back tone commercial. This created a dispute between the band and their producers. The band had signed a contract in which the producers hold all the rights to the master recording and all the rights to distribute the records. This dispute had made Wonderbra and LIMI records to split out, and the band still have no rights to reprint Crossing the Railroad records. In 2011, the band decided to produce their own album under their own label, Dagda Records.

== Track listing ==
All songs written and composed by Wonderbra.

| No. | Title | Length |
|---|---|---|
| 1. | "Dig It Deep" | 3:46 |
| 2. | "Dance With The Blues" | 2:31 |
| 3. | "Crossing The Railroad" | 4:37 |
| 4. | "Die Die Baby, Die!" | 2:36 |
| 5. | "Ode (to Lady Janis)" | 5:48 |
| 6. | "Obituary" | 4:10 |
| 7. | "Midnight Song" | 4:09 |
| 8. | "Hell's Kitchen" | 3:50 |
| Total length: | | 32:00 |

== Personnel ==
Wonderbra

- Teraya Paramehta – vocals
- Nosa Normanda - guitar
- Asep Rachman - bass
- Yuda Wahyudin - guitar
- Edy Sembodo - drums

Additional musicians

- RIzki Musthafa Arisun – keyboard in "Dance with The Blues", "Crossing The Railroad", "Obituary" and "Ode (to Lady Janis)."

Technical personnel

- Harry Sihombing - producer, mixing, mastering.
- Ricky Benito Siahaan - producer, mixing, drumming coach.
- Arief Wicaksono - sound assistant.
- Nosa Normanda - graphic designer
