= Company of Strangers (Company of Strangers album) =

Studio album by Company of Strangers
- Released: 7 December 1992
- Recorded: 1992
- Genre: Rock
- Length: 62:37
- Label: Columbia
- Producer: Simon Hussey

Singles from Company of Strangers
- 1. "Motor City (I Get Lost)" Released: 27 July 1992; 2. "Sweet Love" Released: November 1992; 3. "Daddy's Gonna Make You a Star" Released: January 1993; 4. "Baby, You're a Rich Man (cover)" Released: 1993

Company of Strangers is the first and only studio album by Australian supergroup Company of Strangers. The album was recorded in 1992, and first released in Australia in December 1992. It peaked at number 9 on the ARIA Charts and was certified gold.

Simon Hussey won the ARIA Award for Producer of the year for his work on this album at the ARIA Music Awards of 1993. The album was also nominated for 'Breakthrough Artist' but lost to "Ordinary Angels" by Frente!.

== Track listing ==
All tracks are written by Jef Scott and Simon Hussey except where noted.

CD (Columbia - 472081 2)
No.	Title	Writer(s)	Length
1.	"Daddy's Gonna Make You a Star"	Reyne; Scott; Hussey	4:41
2.	"Ain't No Angels"		4:04
3.	"Motor City (I Get Lost)"		4:43
4.	"Old Broadway"	Reyne; Scott; Hussey	4:52
5.	"Welcome To The Sounds Of Detroit"		1:08
6.	"Sweet Love"		4:37
7.	"Lost In The Rhythm Of Love"	Reyne; Scott; Hussey	6:05
8.	"Do It All Over Again"		4:45
9.	"A Stranger's Place"		1:15
10.	"Loose Ends"	Reyne; Scott; Hussey	3:15
11.	"Baby, You're a Rich Man"	Lennon; McCartney	4:56
12.	"It's Just That Way"		5:31
13.	"You Drive Me Crazy"		1:05
14.	"Should've Known Better / Very Light Hell"		8:11
15.	"Don't Take My Love Away"		4:20
Total length:			63:28

== Personnel ==
- Simon Hussey - keyboards, drums, bass synth, backing vocal
- Jef Scott - vocals (tracks 1,4,7,8,10,11,12,14,15), electric and acoustic guitars, drums, bass
- James Reyne - vocals (tracks 1,3,6,10,11), acoustic guitar
- Daryl Braithwaite - vocals (tracks 1,2,3,11)

== Charts and certifications ==
=== Weekly charts ===
Chart (1993)	Peak position
Australian Albums (ARIA)	9
New Zealand Albums (RMNZ)	18

=== Year-end charts ===
Chart (1993)	Position
Australian Albums Chart	44

=== Certifications ===
Region	Certification	Certified units/sales
Australia (ARIA)	Gold	35,000^{^}
^{^} Shipments figures based on certification alone.

== Trivia ==
- James Reyne recorded an acoustic version of "Daddy's Gonna Make You a Star" for his 2007 album Ghost Ships.
- "Motor City (I Get Lost)" appeared on Reyne's upcoming Live CD/DVD - One Night in Melbourne.
- "Should Have Known Better / Very Light Hell" is listed on the track listing as 14a and 14b, rather than simply 14.
- All tracks on the album cross-fade / over-lap with the following / previous track.
