= Clunk (EP) =

1992 EP by Frente!

EP by Frente!
- Released: 16 March 1992
- Studio: Platinum, Melbourne
- Length: 10:51
- Label: White Label; Mushroom
- Producer: Daniel Denholm

Frente! chronology
Whirled (1991)	Clunk (1992)	Marvin the Album (1992)

Clunk is the second extended play (EP) by Australian alternative rock group Frente!. The five-track EP, produced by Daniel Denholm, was released in March 1992 via the White Label imprint of Mushroom Records. It peaked at No. 3 on Australia's ARIA Singles Chart. Its lead track, "Ordinary Angels", won Breakthrough Artist – Single at ARIA Music Awards of 1993. That track also appeared on their debut album, Marvin the Album, in November and was released as a single in Europe and North America in 1993.

== Track listing ==
All tracks are written by Simon Austin unless otherwise noted

Australian CD and cassette EP
No.	Title	Writer(s)	Length
1.	"Ordinary Angels"	Austin, Angie Hart	2:37
2.	"Book Song"		2:39
3.	"Seamless"	Mark Picton	2:59
4.	"Paper, Bullets and Walls"		2:02
5.	"Nadi"	Hart	0:34

== Personnel ==
Frente!

- Simon Austin – lead guitar, vocals
- Angie Hart – lead vocals, cover art concept
- Tim O'Connor – bass guitar
- Mark Picton – drums, recorder

Production work

- Producer – Daniel Denholm, recorded at Platinum Studios, Melbourne
- Engineer – Rob Rowlands

Art work

- Art design – Louise Beach
- Photography – [band shot]: Sam Karanikos, [front cover pattern shot]: Louise Beach

== Charts ==
=== Weekly charts ===
Chart (1992)	Peak position
Australia (ARIA)	3
New Zealand (Recorded Music NZ)	30

=== Year-end charts ===
Chart (1992)	Position
Australia (ARIA)	20

== Certifications ==
Region	Certification	Certified units/sales
Australia (ARIA)	Gold	35,000^{^}
^{^} Shipments figures based on certification alone.
