= Shape (album) =

Studio album by Frente!
- Released: July 15, 1996
- Recorded: 1995
- Genre: Alternative rock
- Length: 48:22
- Label: Mammoth / Atlantic
- Producers: Cameron McVey, Ted Niceley, David M. Allen, Frente!

Frente! chronology
Lonely (EP) (1994)	Shape (1996)	Live at Fez, New York 2004 (2014)

Singles from Album
- 1. "Sit on My Hands" Released: 1996; 2. "Horrible" Released: 1996; 3. "What's Come Over Me" Released: 1996; 4. "Goodbye Goodguy" Released: 1997; 5. "Jungle" Released: 1998

Professional ratings
Review scores
Source	Rating
AllMusic	3/5 stars
The Encyclopedia of Popular Music	3/5 stars

Shape is the second studio album from Australian band Frente!, released in July 1996. The album was recorded in Spain in 1995 and produced by Cameron McVey and Ted Niceley. It was not as successful as their debut album.

== Critical reception ==
Billboard wrote that the band "breaks new creative ground without straying too far from its quirky style."

== Track listing ==
All tracks are written by Angie Hart and Simon Austin, except where noted.

Shape track listing
No.	Title	Writer(s)	Length
1.	"Sit on My Hands"	Hart	4:00
2.	"Horrible"		1:52
3.	"Goodbye Goodguy"	Austin, Hart, Bill McDonald	2:51
4.	"Burning Girl"		2:36
5.	"Clue"		2:24
6.	"Harm"		3:54
7.	"Air"	Austin, Hart, McDonald	4:23
8.	"Jungle"	Austin, Hart, McDonald, Alastair Barden	3:06
9.	"So Mad"	Hart	2:28
10.	"Safe from You"		4:21
11.	"The Destroyer"		2:33
12.	"What's Come Over Me"	Hart	4:52
13.	"Calmly"		8:59

Japanese edition bonus tracks
No.	Title	Length
14.	"Bill's O Bubblin"
15.	"Dub on My Hands"

== Weekly charts ==
Chart (1996)	Peak position
Australian Albums (ARIA)	35

== Personnel ==
- Angie Hart - lead vocals
- Simon Austin - guitar and backing vocals
- Bill McDonald - bass guitar
- Alastair Barden - drums
