= Labour of Love (Frente! EP) =

EP by Frente!
- Released: 1993
- Recorded: 1991/92
- Label: Mammoth
- Producer: Michael Koppelman, Owen Bolwell, Daniel Denholm, Frente!

Frente! chronology
Marvin the Album (1992)	Labour of Love (1993)	Lonely (EP) (1994)

Professional ratings
Review scores
Source	Rating
Allmusic	4.5/5 stars

Labour of Love is the third Extended Play by Australian alternative rock group Frente!. It was released outside of Australia in 1993. The EP peaked at number 10 on the US Top Heatseekers chart.

== Reviews ==
JT Griffith of All Music gave the EP 4.5 out of 5 saying; "[Labour of Love is] a collection of full songs and acoustic demos, the highlight is the standout cover of New Order's "Bizarre Love Triangle". Five of the seven tracks are two minutes or less. "Labour of Love" and "Not Given Lightly" are representative of the Frente! sound: acoustic love songs built around Angie Hart's Lisa Loeb-like vocals. "Paper, Bullets, Walls" finds Frente! in a more upbeat groove. Overall, the band had a classic pre-grunge, alternative sound."

Double J named the title song in the top fifty Australian songs of the 1990s, saying, "This bare-bones song showed the world why we were all so captivated by Hart's voice. For all the comparisons people made to other female folk singers, it was clear she injected something unique and real into her performance."

== Track listing ==
1. "Labour of Love" - 3:03
2. "Testimony" - 1:27
3. "Not Given Lightly" - 3:33
4. "Paper, Bullets, Walls" - 2:02
5. "Risk" - 0:27
6. "Bizarre Love Triangle" - 2:01
7. "Oh Brilliance" - 1:57

== Personnel ==
- Bass – Tim O'Connor
- Design – Marney McKenna, MushroomArt
- Illustration [Cover Illustration] – Ross Hipwell
- Vocals, Art Direction – Angie Hart
- Vocals, Guitar, Programmed By – Simon Austin
