= Splendid (musical duo) =

American musical duo (1999–2005)

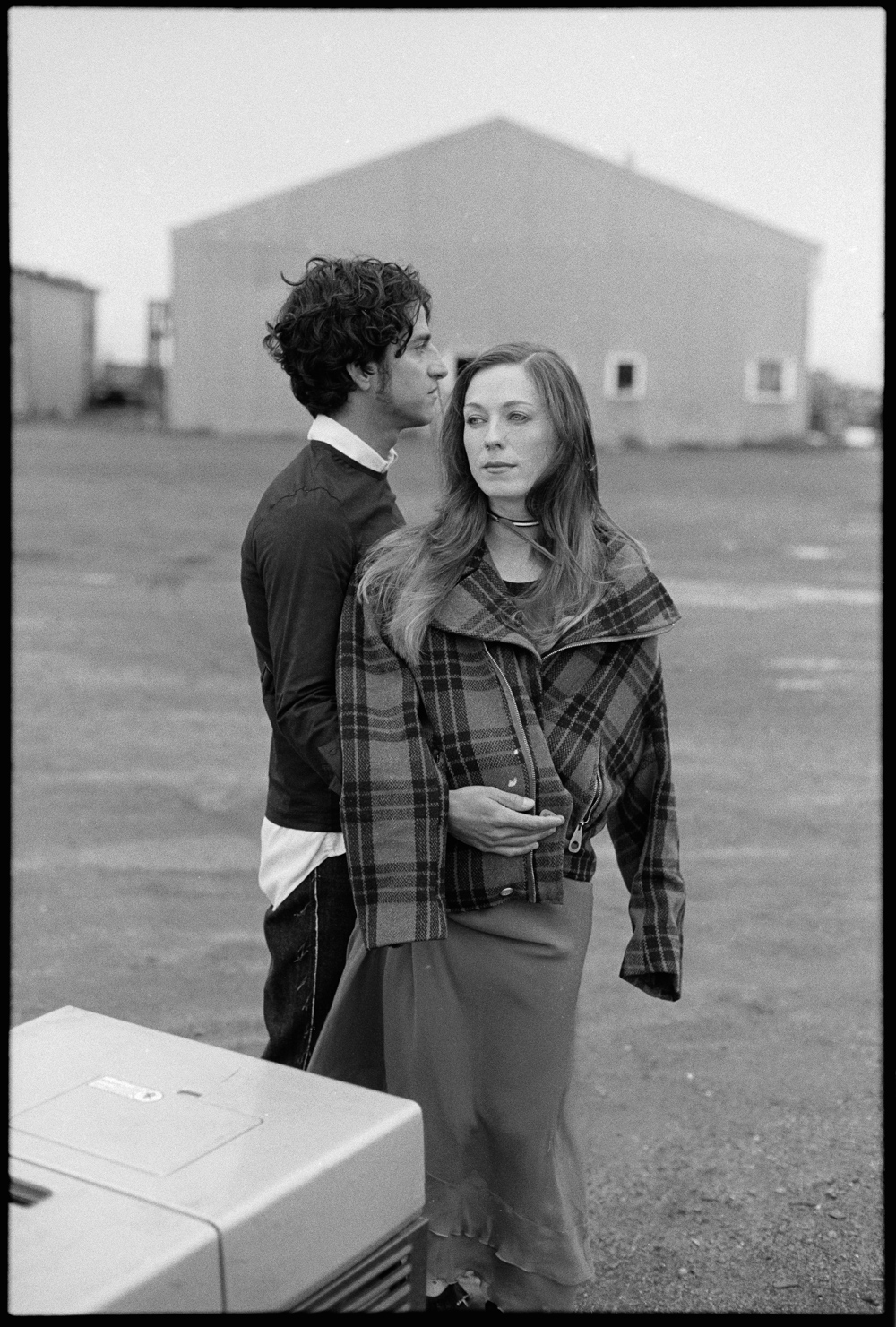
- Splendid in 1999

Background information
- Origin: Los Angeles, California, U.S.
- Genre: Indie pop
- Years active: 1999–2005
- Labels: Mammoth; Popboomerang
- Past members: Angie Hart; Jesse Tobias

Splendid was a musical duo of Angie Hart and Jesse Tobias, who at the time were also husband and wife.

== History ==
They met in Canada, August 1996, when the Australian band Frente!, fronted by Hart, arrived to play over two weeks of support dates for Alanis Morissette's Jagged Little Pill tour, Jesse's band for the last two years – previously with Mother Tongue and the Red Hot Chili Peppers. After the tour, Frente! dissolved. Hart and Tobias married, and decided to form a band, the result being Splendid.

Splendid released its only album, Have You Got a Name for It, in 1999. To their dismay it was released only in Australia, with the American release cancelled by the record company (Mammoth Records) even though the discs had already been manufactured. Frustrated with the music industry, they thought the best approach was to produce their music independently. They divorced in 2005.

Splendid appeared on the television series Buffy the Vampire Slayer three times beginning with the episode "I Only Have Eyes for You" in which Hart sang "Charge", to the episode "The Freshman" in which she sang "You and Me". Hart also co-wrote (with the Buffy creator Joss Whedon) and performed the song "Blue" for the seventh season episode "Conversations with Dead People". No other musical guest on the series was involved in more episodes.

== Discography ==
=== Albums ===
- Have You Got a Name for It (1999)

=== EPs ===
- States of Awake (2004)

=== Singles ===
- "Less Than Zero" (1999)
- "Come Clean" (1999)
