= Fiksifriksi =

#fiksifriksi

Studio album by Wonderbra
- Released: July 22, 2011
- Recorded: May 2009 – June 2011
- Studios: Liquid Studio, Depok
- Genres: Alternative rock, funk, rock, psychedelic, blues
- Length: 45:06
- Label: Dagda Records
- Producers: Asep Rachman Muchlas, Teraya Paramehta, Nosa Normanda, Yuda "Kuyut" Wahyudin, Tyagita Silka

Wonderbra chronology
Crossing the Railroad (2007)	#fiksifriksi (2011)

Singles from {{#}}fiksifriksi
- 1. "Indie V" Released: August 26, 2010; 2. "Tak Ada Cinta di Lemari" Released: June 24, 2011; 3. "Revolution" Released: March 5, 2012; 4. "Simple Things" Released: March 6, 2016

#fiksifriksi is the second album by Indonesian rock band Wonderbra, released on July 22, 2011, by Dagda Records through SebarSabar distributor. All songs were written and arranged by Teraya Paramehta, Nosa Normanda, Asep Rachman Muchlas and Yuda "Kuyut" Wahyudin. The album was mostly self-produced by Wonderbra, except the track "It's Loona", which was co-produced with Tyagita Silka. Some of these are old songs which were rejected by the producers of Crossing The Railroad, such as "Indie V", which was released as a single in 2010.

== Background ==
After separating from their old label in 2009, Wonderbra decided to record their songs on their own. Times were quite hard because after the hype of Crossing The Railroad passed, they faced new problems such as the dismissal of Edy Sembodo (after recording "Indie V"), and the resignation of their managers due to personal problems. They started to record the new songs in separate studios, but mostly in Calista Studio, Depok.

== Recording and composition ==
Fiksifriksi was recorded in four years. One of the songs, "Indie V", was taken from the demo tracks of the first album. The lyrics were originally written in English, as an abbreviation of "Independent Vagina", but later was rewritten to Indonesia by Tera and Nosa. The song was written as a reaction of the Bill against Pornography and Pornoaction in Indonesia which controlled how women should dress in public. Other songs such as "It's Loona" and "Kotak Pandora" were meant to be a solo project but later contributed to the album.

The main concept of the album was exploration and experimentation. The influence of The Doors can still be heard, but the band have picked out new sounds such as The Dresden Dolls. This influence can be heard in the single "Tak Ada Cinta di Lemari" (No Love in The Closet). Blues was still part of the band, as shown in the songs such as "Since My Baby" and "One Month in Bed." The band also tried to record a power pop song, "It's Loona", which was influenced by The Beach Boys, and a choir based song, "Kotak Pandora." They also tried to make a protest song, entitled "Simple Things."

All main personnel started to play multiple instruments on this album. Tera plays the harmonica, Asep plays the flute and additional percussion, and Kuyut plays the cajon. The album was supported by three drummers. Edy Sembodo filled in on drums in the songs "Indie V," Zico played in the songs "It's Loona" and "Tak Ada Cinta di Lemari," and Rizky Aisis Pattynama played in the rest of the album. Different drummers created a different atmosphere in each song, which makes the album rich with variations.

The album also involved additional players such as Iman Fattah of Zeke and The Popo, who played hammond in the song "Since my Baby," Avrila Bayu Santoso of Zivilia played piano in the same song, and Rizki Mustafa Arisun plays keyboard in "Tak Ada Cinta di Lemari."

== Packaging ==
The hardest thing in recording an exploration album was in finding an album title that could bind all the songs. Nosa came up with the title "#fiksifriksi", from two words: "fiction" and "friction". The title means that the album contains songs that tell stories about friction, or conflicts between the global and the local, between lovers, and between paradoxes in human beings.

A professional photographer, Putra Sophan Pribadi, contributed some of his works as the whole artwork in the album. The cover depicts two local boxers hitting each other at the same time, but both of them miss. It also looks like they are running toward the same direction, not boxing. Inside the sleeve are some others photos shot by Sopan, describing the conflict of everyday life of an Indonesian, from the disparity between the rich and the poor, to the geometry of a parking lot.

The album was packaged in a box set, and also contained two bonuses: a board game of snake and ladders which narrates the band's history, and a secret song inside the record. The band printed, folded, and packed the CDs themselves and with the help of friends. With the release of #fiksifriksi, the band officially owned their own record label called Dagda and their distributor team SebarSabar.

== Release and reception ==
In 2009, Wonderbra got a new manager, a radio producer named Rendy Yusuf Satria Sularto. Under Sularto's management, the band got a lot of gigs, including some international events such as Jakarta Blues Festival, Jakarta Rock Parade, and Java Rockinland. #fiksifriksi had a pre-launch in Coffee War Kemang on June 20, 2011, and was launched in Java Rockinland with their theatrical performance: Opera Setan (The Devil's Opera). According to most audiences, this was one of the most memorable performances in Java Rockinland 2011.

The album was received with mixed reviews. The Rolling Stone Indonesia said the album was "wonderful" and that "the band have the ability to... transform themes to be an interesting songs." Website Deathrockstar said that the album "...was only playing 'surface' rock and roll,... like a template." The newspaper Tribun Medan wrote, "Thera vocal power has made some songs in this album to be extraordinary. Her high-pitched voice changes to be hoarse in a certain level of tone, reminding us of the queen of soul Janis Joplin."

== Track listing ==
All songs written and composed by Wonderbra.

No.	Title	Length
1.	"Revolution"	3:24
2.	"Indie V"	4:17
3.	"Since My Baby"	6:19
4.	"Tak Ada Cinta di Lemari"	4:08
5.	"Crossing The Railroad (Acoustic)"	4:30
6.	"One Month in Bed"	5:06
7.	"It's Loona"	2:48
8.	"Simple Things"	5:02
9.	"Kotak Pandora"	9:32
Total length:		45:06

== Personnel ==
Wonderbra

- Teraya Paramehta – vocals, harmonica
- Nosa Normanda - guitar, vocals
- Asep Rachman - bass, flute, percussions
- Yuda Wahyudin - guitar, cajon

Additional musicians

- RIzki Musthafa Arisun – keyboard in "Tak Ada Cinta Di Lemari"
- Iman Fattah - hammond in "Since My Baby", backing vocal in "Simple Things"
- Avrila Bayu Santoso - piano in "Since My Baby"
- Edy Sembodo - drums in "Indie V"
- Zico - drums in "It's Loona" and "Tak Ada Cinta di Lemari"
- Rizki Aisis Pattynama - drums in "Revolution", "Since My Baby", and "One Month in Bed", backing vocal in "Simple Things"

Technical personnel

- Tubagus "Tebe" Taufik - mixing, mastering
- Muslih - sound assistant
- Putra Sophan Pribadi - photographer
- Nosa Normanda - graphic designer
