= Wonderbra (band) =

Indonesian band from Depok, West Java

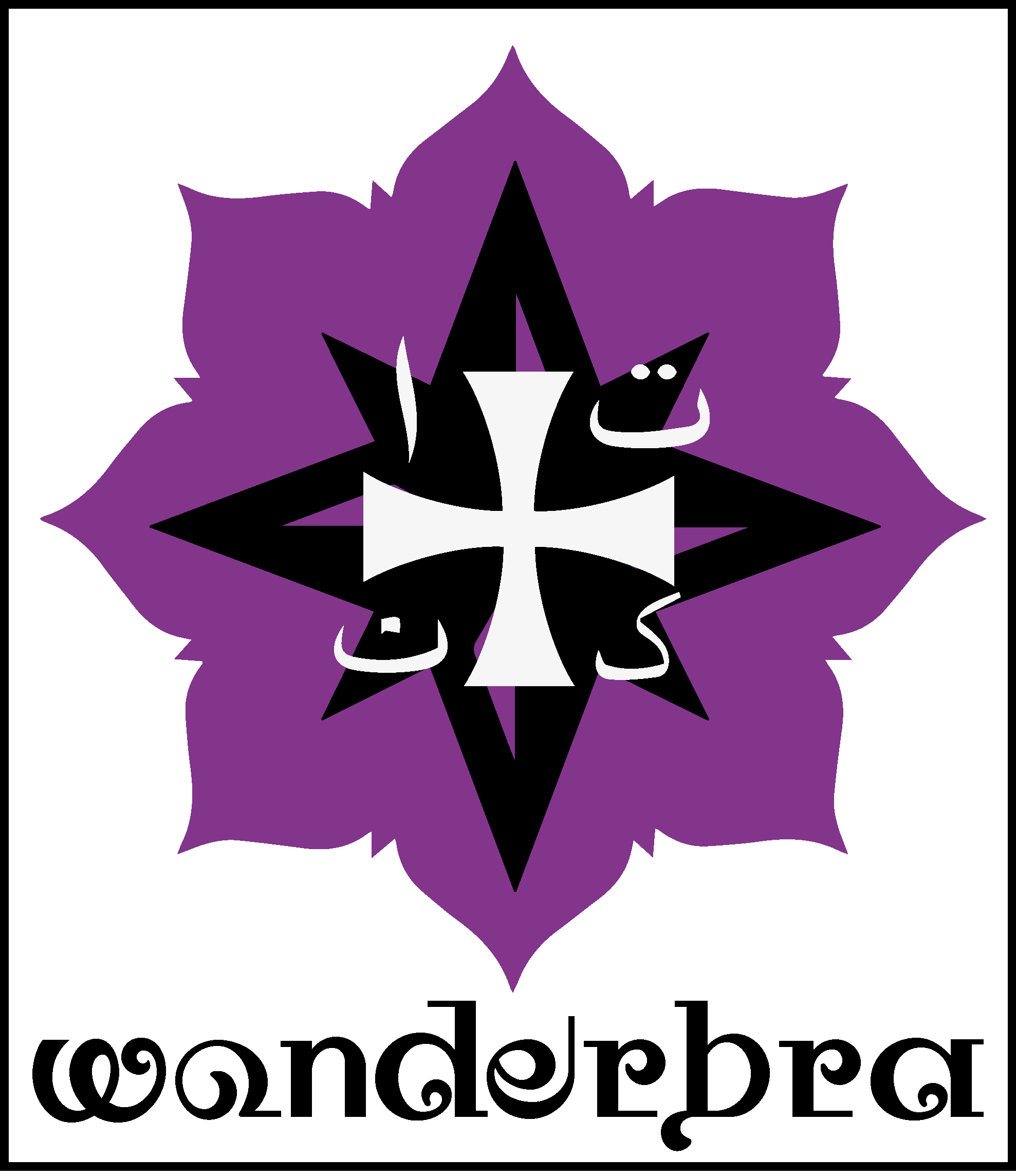
- The lotus, compass and templar cross represents spirituality. The Arabic letter represents the first letter of each band members name. The icon was inspired by Tera's tattoo

Background information
- Origin: Depok, Indonesia
- Genres: Rock and Roll, Psychedelic, Blues
- Years active: 2005–present
- Labels: Liquid Music Indonesia (early), Dagda Records, Ripstore.asia
- Members: Tera; Nosa; Asep; Kuyut
- Past members: Edy Sembodo; I.G.M. Arya Sutta
- Website: wonderbra.band

Wonderbra (band) is an Indonesian independent band from Depok, West Java. The group was formed in 2005 and consists of Teraya Paramehta (vocals), Nosa Normanda (guitar), Asep Rachman Muchlas (Bass) and Yuda Wahyudin (guitar). They have released two albums: Crossing The Railroad (2007) and #fiksifriksi (2011).

== Achievements ==
- 2007: The single "Hell's Kitchen" from Crossing The Railroad reached no.1 in Ardan Radio Bandung.
- 2008: "Indie-V", a single
- 2011: The band's second album, #fiksifriksi has been listed in top 10 album chart by Rolling Stone Indonesia, at which Wonderbra was ranked #7 in September 2011 and #10 in October 2011, sharing the list with other musicians in Indonesia, such as Raisa, Geisha, Gigi, Burgerkill, BRNDLS (The Brandals), and Marcel. Music writer/comedian Soleh Solihun reviewed #fiksifriksi as "A wonderful album."
- In the last eleven years, Wonderbra have performed in hundreds of gigs and several TV shows such as Radio Show in tvOne (Indonesia), and O Channel. Some of their local gigs are RCT UI Backstage in 2007, Indie Carnival HUT Serang, West Java, 2008 and Grassroot Showcase 2 in 2011. They have also performed in international events such as Jakarta Rock Parade 2009, Jakarta Blues Festival 2009, and Java Rockinland 2011.

== Supporting social movements ==
They participate actively in social change events, and they appear in the BERSAMA Project, music video, a creative intervention for gender equality with the theme #1Voice4Women. In the project they performed alongside Tika and The Dissidents, Bonita & the husBAND, and singer Yacko in making video clips directed by Flo Hadjon. They speak up about climate change by performing in an event organized by OXFAM. And they also performed with Tika and The Dissidents in celebrating International Women's Day in Jakarta, with the theme "Tubuhku Otoritasku" (My Body My Authority).

== Discography ==
=== Studio albums ===
- Crossing the Railroad (2007), LIMI Records
- #fiksifriksi (2011), Dagda Records

=== Mini albums ===
- Seven Awesome Years (2012), Self-released

=== Compilations ===
- Provoke! Magazine Compilation, Vol. 1. (2008), Provoke Magazine
- Kompilasi Kansas (2015), Akhirnya Direcord
