= Pop! featuring Angie Hart =

Australian musical group

Pop! is an Australian studio band formed in the 1990s. It was formed as a side project of Amy Flower (formerly known as Tony Stott) of now defunct Melbourne band About Six Feet. Together with Frente's Angie Hart they recorded the song "Tingly", which was released as a single in 1995, and peaked at number 92 on the Australian ARIA singles chart. "Tingly" was placed at number 97 on the Triple J Hottest 100 of the same year.

A follow-up single from Pop! featuring Angie Hart, "Waiting", followed after 26 years on 1 December 2021.

On November 7, 2025, Pop! released a new single, 'Hey Yo!', which doesn't feature Angie Hart.

== Discography ==
=== Singles ===
List of singles, with selected chart positions
Title	Year	Peak chart positions
Title	Year	AUS
"Tingly"	1995	92
"Waiting"	2021	—
