= Tingly =

Single by Pop! featuring Angie Hart
- B-side: "Tingly" (Ang-elic), "Tingly" (I Wish My Brother George Martin Was Here), "Tingly" (Hartless), "Zoo" (Instrumental 8-track demo)
- Released: 9 October 1995
- Recorded: Toyland (Melbourne)
- Genre: Indie pop
- Length: 3:33
- Label: White
- Songwriter: Flower/Richards
- Producer: Pop! and Anthony Horan

"Tingly" is a song recorded by Pop! featuring Angie Hart. It was written by Amy Flower (formerly known as Tony Stott) and John Richards of About Six Feet, and released as Flower's solo side project. Recorded in an hour on Good Friday 1995, the vocals were performed by Angie Hart, who was then in the highly successful band Frente. It was released on October 9, 1995 and became a popular song on the radio, making it on to Triple J Hottest 100, 1995. The single peaked at #92 on the Australian ARIA singles chart in December 1995. It was also featured in dozens of episodes of Neighbours and Home and Away, and was featured on the first Home and Away soundtrack album.

Named "Single of the Week" in both Beat Magazine and 3D, and "Single Of The Year" in the Sydney Telegraph Mirror, "Tingly" was particularly loved by JJJ's Richard Kingsmill. Kingsmill was instrumental in its release, having played it repeatedly when it was sent to him as a demo recording. He was originally asked to stop playing it by White Records, home of Frente, who had not given permission for Hart to make the recording. In the end, White - somewhat begrudgingly - released it as a 5-track single, but refused to make a video for it. There was concern in the company that the song would harm Frente's move to a more adult sound, which they were trying with the Shape album (released a year later in 1996). While never a hit, it received critical acclaim and sold well over a long period.

Tingly, has a lush, retro Brit pop feel, a bit like Saint Etienne - all open top cars, flowing scarves and endless motorways. Pretty special.

— Sue Yeap, The West Australian

Picture (in black and white) Julie Christie skipping through English suburban streets happy with the thought that Terence Stamp is awaiting her arrival at the local as the strings swirl, the beat intensifies and the fragile vocal builds to a euphoric peak.

— Andrew Mast, Inpress Magazine

A grandiose, enormous, hugely gorgeous pop epic reminiscent of Dusty Springfield meets the Pet Shop Boys, Tingly is everything music should be. Gorge yourself on this pop feast because to miss out would be a crime.

— Kathy McCabe, Sydney Telegraph Mirror

You see, Tingly is the genuine thing - a one-off pop project that came together for just one song. And it is totally brilliant - the most glorious old-fashioned pop song redolent of '60s Motown, the Box Tops, the Equals, Dusty Springfield, Kathy Kirby, the British beat boom, all rolled into one litany of harmony and melody set over sweeping, coiling keyboards, tramping drums, a burbling bass and the most effervescent, perfect, vocal Angie Hart (of Frente) has delivered in her life. Guaranteed a place in the history of Australian music… for one of the classic pop songs of its and any time. Congratulations, to all involved. Simply, wonderful.

— Mike Gee, 3D Magazine

== Charts ==
Chart (1995)	Peak position
Australia (ARIA)	92
