= Daddy's Gonna Make You a Star =

"Daddy's Gonna Make You a Star!"
- CD single cover

Single by Company of Strangers

from the album Company of Strangers
- A-side: "Daddy's Gonna Make You a Star!"
- B-side: "Don't Take My Love Away" / "Wind and Fire"
- Released: 31 January 1993
- Genre: Pop; rock
- Length: 4:41
- Label: Columbia Records
- Songwriter(s): S. Hussey, J. Scott, J. Reyne
- Producer(s): Simon Hussey

Company of Strangers singles chronology
"Sweet Love" (1992)	"Daddy's Gonna Make You a Star!" (1993)	"Baby You're a Rich Man" (1993)

"Daddy's Gonna Make You a Star!" is the third single from Australian supergroup Company of Strangers. The track was released in January 1993 and peaked at number 35 in March.

At the APRA Music Awards of 1993, the song won Most Performed Australian Work.

== Track listings ==
CD Single (659001 1)

1. "Daddy's Gonna Make You a Star!" - 4:41
2. "Don't Take My Love Away" - 4:18
3. "Wind and Fire" - 3:39

== Chart positions ==
=== Weekly charts ===
Chart (1993)	Peak position
Australia (ARIA)	35
New Zealand (Recorded Music NZ)	28

== Cover Versions ==
- In 2007, James Reyne recorded an acoustic version for his album Ghost Ships.
