= Lonely (Frente! EP) =

EP by Frente!
- Released: May 1994
- Label: White
- Producers: Daniel Denholm, Frente!

Frente! chronology
Labour of Love (1993)	Lonely (1994)	Shape (1996)

Lonely is the fourth extended play (EP) by Australian alternative rock group Frente!. It was released in Australia in May 1994 and peaked at number seven on the Australian Singles Chart, earning a gold sales certification. Prior to the EP's release, "Lonely" was originally issued as a three-track single on 17 January 1994 and peaked at number 88 on the Australian Singles Chart.

== Track listings ==
All songs were written by Angie Hart and Simon Austin unless otherwise noted.

Australian CD and maxi-cassette single

1. "Lonely"
2. "Explode"
3. "Get Real" (with Dean and Gene Ween)
4. "Not Given Lightly" (Knox)
5. "Bizarre Love Triangle" (New Order)

Three-track CD single version

1. "Lonely"
2. "Explode"
3. "Get Real" (with Dean and Gene Ween)

== Charts ==
=== Weekly charts ===
Chart (1994)	Peak position
Australia (ARIA)	7

=== Year-end charts ===
Chart (1994)	Position
Australia (ARIA)	63

== Certifications ==
Region	Certification	Certified units/sales
Australia (ARIA)	Gold	35,000^{^}
^{^} Shipments figures based on certification alone.
