= No Time (Frente! song) =

1993 single by Frente!

Single by Frente!

from the album Marvin the Album
- B-side: "Thinking Darling"; "Blue"; "Face Like a Spider"
- Released: 30 January 1993
- Length: 3:21
- Label: White
- Songwriter(s): Tim O'Connor
- Producer(s): Frente!; Michael Koppelman

Frente! singles chronology
| "Accidently Kelly Street" (1992) | "No Time" (1993) | "Ordinary Angels" (1993) |

"No Time" is a song by Australian indie pop and ARIA award-winning group, Frente!. The song was released in January 1993 as the second single from their debut studio album, Marvin the Album. The song peaked at number 50 on the Australian Singles Chart.

== Track listing ==
CD single

1. "No Time" – 3:21
2. "Thinking Darling" – 1:00
3. "Blue" – 1:30
4. "No Time" (Something Fishy mix) – 3:19
5. "Face Like a Spider" – 0:52

== Charts ==
| Chart (1993) | Peak position |
|---|---|
| Australia (ARIA) | 50 |
