= Motor City (I Get Lost) =

- CD single cover

Single by Company of Strangers

from the album Company of Strangers
- A-side: "Motor City (I Get Lost)"
- B-side: "Damn California"
- Released: 27 July 1992
- Genre: Pop; rock
- Length: 4:45
- Label: Columbia Records
- Songwriter: S. Hussey J. Scott,
- Producer: Simon Hussey

Company of Strangers singles chronology
"Motor City (I Get Lost)" (1992)	"Sweet Love" (1992)

"Motor City (I Get Lost)" is the first single from Australian supergroup Company of Strangers. The single was released in July 1992 and peaked at number 26 in Australia in September 1992. It features the vocals of Daryl Braithwaite and James Reyne.

At the ARIA Music Awards of 1993, the song was nominated for 'breakthrough artist single' award, but lost out to "Ordinary Angels" by Frente!.

== Video ==
A video was also created. James Reyne plays a guitar with various industries in the backgrounds and Daryl Braithwaite drives a car.

== Track listings ==
CD Single

1. "Motor City (I Get Lost)" - 4:45
2. "Damn California" - 4:51

== Chart positions ==
=== Weekly charts ===
Chart (1992)	Peak position
Australia (ARIA)	26
New Zealand (Recorded Music NZ)	49

== Sydney Buses "We're Moving Sydney" Edit ==
Around 1994, the State Transit Authority of Sydney Buses introduced their "We're Moving Sydney" slogan for their advertising on television.

The advert featured a slightly altered version of Motor City where minor changes were made to the original lyrics to suit the theme of the advert. Most notably, the recurring lyric within the original song was changed from "Here in motor city" to "We're moving Sydney". The dubbed lyrics were still sung by both Braithwaite and Reyens together with the original instrumental backing track.
