= Ordinary Angels =

1993 single by Frente!

Single by Frente!

from the album Marvin the Album
- Released: 1993
- Length: 2:37
- Label: Mammoth, Mushroom
- Songwriters: A Hart, S Austin
- Producer: Daniel Denholm

Frente! singles chronology
"No Time" (1993)	"Ordinary Angels" (1993)	"Lonely" (1994)

Music video
- "Ordinary Angels" on YouTube

"Ordinary Angels" is a song by Australian indie pop group Frente!. The song was not released as a single in Australia but was included on the Clunk EP, which peaked at number three on the Australian ARIA Singles Chart in 1992. "Ordinary Angels" was released in North America and Europe in 1993 and was included on their first full-length album Marvin the Album. The song won the Breakthrough Artist – Single category at the ARIA Music Awards of 1993.

== Background ==
According to Angie Hart, 'Ordinary Angels' was written in a day. "We'd flown to Sydney to meet with (record label) RooArt who were courting us with a demo deal. We stupidly offered them a brand-new song as a sweetener, thinking it would make things more solid. Of course we hadn't written it yet. We had nothing and Simon and I were devastated. We were both exhausted and despondent and through sobs, the first lines of the song emerged. It stacked like a puzzle, word by word, chord by chord. It is still one of my favourites to this day."

== Track listings ==
European CD single

1. "Ordinary Angels" (A Hart, S Austin) – 2:37
2. "Book Song" (S Austin) – 2:39
3. "Seamless" (M Picton) – 2:59
4. "Nadi" (A Hart) – 0:34

North American CD single

1. "Ordinary Angels" – 2:51
2. "Most Beautiful" (acoustic version) – 2:32
3. "Ordinary Angels" (acoustic version) – 2:41
4. "Accidently Kelly Street" (acoustic version) – 3:18

1994 CD remixes

1. "Ordinary Angels" – 2:48
2. "Ordinary Angels" (7-inch remix) – 2:48
3. "Ordinary Angels" (Ayonarra mix) – 2:52
