= Sweet Love (Company of Strangers song) =

- CD single cover

Single by Company of Strangers

from the album Company of Strangers
- A-side: "Sweet Love"
- B-side: "Should've Known Better / Very Light Hell"
- Released: November 1992
- Genre: Pop; rock
- Length: 4:37
- Label: Columbia Records
- Songwriter(s): S. Hussey J. Scott
- Producer(s): Simon Hussey

Company of Strangers singles chronology
"Motor City (I Get Lost)" (1992)	"Sweet Love" (1992)	"Daddy's Gonna Make You a Star" (1993)

"Sweet Love" is the second single from Australian supergroup Company of Strangers. The track was released in November 1992 and peaked at number 21 in December. It features the vocals of James Reyne and backing vocals by Daryl Braithwaite

== Track listings ==
CD Single

1. "Sweet Love" - 4:37
2. "Should've Known Better" / "Very Light Hell" - 8:11

== Chart positions ==
=== Weekly charts ===
Chart (1992)	Peak position
Australia (ARIA)	21
New Zealand (Recorded Music NZ)	32
