= Ben Mastwyk =

- Born: Victoria, Australia
- Genres: country-soul
- Occupation(s): Songwriter, singer
- Instruments: Vocals
- Years active: 2015–present
- Labels: Ben Mastwyk, Social Family Records
- Website: www.benmastwyk.com

Ben Mastwyk is an Australian country songwriter and entertainer.

== History ==
In 2015, Mastwyk released his debut album Mornin' Evenin' limited to 100 vinyl copies, before it was released digitally in 2016.

In 2016 Mastwyk formed a band to record Winning Streak. The band called The Millions features Ben Franz, Josh Duiker, Michael Hubbard and Craig Kelly.

In March 2021, Mastwyk released his third studio album, Livin' on Gold Street, which became his first to peak inside the ARIA top 50.

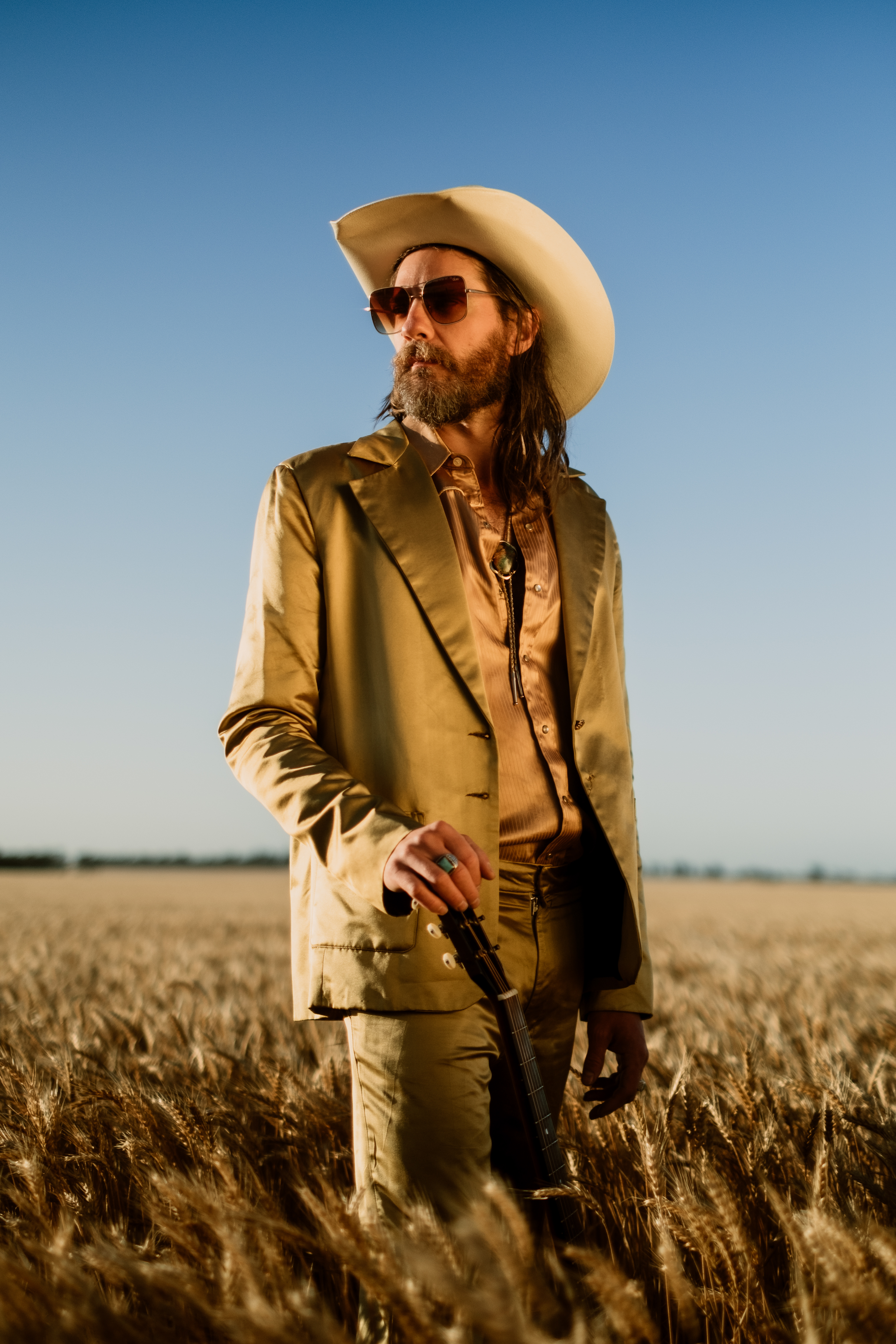

== Discography ==
=== Studio albums ===
Title	Details	Peak positions
Title	Details	AUS
Mornin' Evenin'	Release date: 2015; Label: Ben Mastwyk; Formats: LP, CD	-
Winning Streak (credited to Ben Mastwyk & The Millions)	Release date: 31 May 2018; Label: Ben Mastwyk; Formats: CD, DD, streaming	-
Livin' on Gold Street	Release date: 26 March 2021; Label: Social Family Records; Formats: CD, DD, streaming	49

== Awards and nominations ==
=== Music Victoria Awards ===
The Music Victoria Awards, are an annual awards night celebrating Victorian music. They commenced in 2005.

Year	Nominee / work	Award	Result	Ref.
2015	Mornin', Evenin	Best Country Album	Nominated	
2018	Winning Streak (with The Millions)	Best Country Album	Nominated	
2021	Ben Mastwyk & His Millions	Best Country Act	Nominated	
