= Clunker =

Clunker may refer to:

- A decrepit car
- A western Canadian term for a large hiking boot, often found in outdoors stores
- A cruiser bicycle built during the mid Seventies, in Marin county, California. The inspiration for the Mountain bike.
- A variant of clanker, a word used against AI and robots.
