= Marvin the Album =

Studio album by Frente!
- Released: 24 November 1992
- Recorded: 1992
- Genres: Folk-pop; pop; indie pop; alternative pop; alternative rock
- Length: 39:32 (Australian); 41:13 (international); 83:49 (21st Anniversary Edition)
- Labels: Festival Mushroom, Mammoth
- Producers: Frente!, Michael Koppelman, Daniel Denholm,

Frente! chronology
Clunk (EP) (1992)	Marvin the Album (1992)	Labour of Love (EP) (1993)

Professional ratings
Review scores
Source	Rating
AllMusic	4.5/5 stars
Music Week	3/5 stars
NME	(7/10)
Q	4/5 stars
Rolling Stone	4/5 stars

Marvin the Album is the Australian folk-pop and alternative rock group Frente!'s debut album, released 24 November 1992 (26 April 1994 outside Australia), and recorded in 1992 at Platinum Studios in Melbourne, Australia. Music videos were made for the tracks "Accidently Kelly Street" [sic], "Ordinary Angels" and "No Time", each of which were also released as singles. Additional videos were made for "Lonely" and "Bizarre Love Triangle" when these tracks were appended to the international release.

== Background ==
Marvin the Album was the debut album by Frente! released on 24 November 1992, which peaked at No. 5 on the ARIA Albums Chart. It was produced by Daniel Denholm (Club Hoy), Michael Koppelman (Prince) and the band. The album was certified platinum in Australia. Two of its tracks, "Ordinary Angels" and "Accidently Kelly Street", were placed on the ARIA end-of-year charts for 1992, at No. 20 and No. 29 respectively. At the ARIA Music Awards of 1993, the group won 'Breakthrough Artist – Album' for Marvin the Album and Breakthrough Artist – Single for "Ordinary Angels". The album was also nominated for Best Cover Art (by Angie Hart and Louise Beach) and "Ordinary Angels" was nominated for Best Video (directed by Robbie Douglas-Turner). Another single, "No Time", was released in February 1993, and peaked at No. 50 in March.

== Track listing ==
=== Original release ===
1. "Girl" (Angie Hart) - 2:42
2. "Accidently Kelly Street" (Tim O' Connor) - 3:01 [sic]
3. "Most Beautiful" (Simon Austin) - 2:50
4. "No Time" (O' Connor) - 3:18
5. "Cuscatlan" (Austin) - 2:50
6. "Pretty Friend" (O' Connor) - 3:01
7. "1.9.0" (Mark Picton) - 2:35
8. "Reflect" (Picton) - 3:20
9. "Out of My Sight" (Picton) - 3:07
10. "See/Believe" (Austin, O' Connor) - 2:53
11. "Labour of Love" (Austin, Hart) - 3:19
12. "Ordinary Angels" (Austin, Hart) - 3:08
13. "Dangerous" (Austin) - 3:02

=== International version ===
1. "Girl" – 2:42
2. "Labour of Love" – 3:01
3. "Ordinary Angels" – 2:49
4. "Lonely" – 3:23
5. "Most Beautiful" – 2:50
6. "Cuscutlan" – 3:00
7. "Pretty Friend" – 2:35
8. "No Time" – 3:20
9. "Reflect" – 3:06
10. "Explode" – 2:50
11. "Accidently Kelly Street" – 3:21
12. "See/Believe" – 3:06
13. "Dangerous" – 3:00
14. "Bizarre Love Triangle" – 2:01

=== Differences ===
- "1.9.0" and "Out of My Sight" appear only on the original version
- "Bizarre Love Triangle", "Explode", and "Lonely" appear only on the international version
- The spelling of "Cuscatlan"/"Cuscutlan" is inconsistent.

=== "21st Anniversary Edition" (2014) ===
This reissue contains all the tracks from the original and international editions, together with an additional CD of early material.

CD1

1. "Girl"
2. "Accidently Kelly Street" [sic]
3. "Most Beautiful"
4. "No Time"
5. "Cuscatlan"
6. "Pretty Friend"
7. "1.9.0"
8. "Reflect"
9. "Out of My Sight"
10. "See/Believe"
11. "Labour of Love"
12. "Ordinary Angels"
13. "Dangerous"
14. "Lonely"
15. "Explode"
16. "Bizarre Love Triangle"

CD2

1. "Love And Terror"
2. "Oh Brilliance"
3. "Last To Know"
4. "Labour of Love" (Original)
5. "Risk"
6. "Baby Blue Sycophant"
7. "Testimony"
8. "Discipline And Deep Water"
9. "Ordinary Angels" (Original)
10. "Book Song"
11. "Seamless"
12. "Paper Bullets And Walls"
13. "Nadi"
14. "Somethin' Stupid (Stoopid)"
15. "Blue"
16. "Not Given Lightly"
17. "I Will Miss You"

CD2 tracks 1–8 from the Whirled EP, 9–13 from the Clunk EP, 14–17 listed as "Rarities".

== Personnel ==
- Angie Hart - lead vocals
- Simon Austin - guitar and backing vocals
- Tim O'Connor - bass guitar
- Mark Picton - drums

== Charts ==
Chart (1998)	Peak position	Certifications	Sales/Shipments
Australia (ARIA)	5	Platinum	70,000
New Zealand (RIANZ)	4		
US Billboard 200	75		
US Top Heatseekers	1		
Canada RPM	45		

== Certifications ==
Region	Certification	Certified units/sales
Australia (ARIA)	Platinum	70,000^{^}
Canada (Music Canada)	Gold	50,000^{^}
^{^} Shipments figures based on certification alone.
