= Accidently Kelly Street =

1992 single by Frente!

Single by Frente!

from the album Marvin the Album
- B-side: "Ordinary Angels"
- Released: 26 October 1992
- Studio: Platinum (Melbourne)
- Genre: Pop
- Length: 3:21
- Label: White
- Songwriter: Tim O'Connor
- Producers: Michael Koppelman; Frente!

Frente! singles chronology
"Accidently Kelly Street" (1992)	"No Time" (1993)

"Accidently Kelly Street" is a song by Australian indie pop group Frente!, released as their debut single in October 1992 ahead of their debut studio album, Marvin the Album. The title includes an unintentional misspelling of "accidentally" that the band decided to keep. The song peaked at No. 4 on both the Australian and New Zealand singles charts, and it was a minor hit in the United Kingdom in 1994, peaking at No. 80 on the UK Singles Chart.

== Background and release ==
Frente! had formed in 1989 by Simon Austin on guitar and backing vocals, Angie Hart on lead vocals, Tim O'Connor on bass guitar and Mark Picton on drums and recorder. O'Connor was moving to a new address in Kenny Street, Richmond, Victoria – he mistakenly told his bandmates that it was Kelly Street; "I'm going to write a song about the house" he later told them. Hart suggested that he call it "Accidentally Kelly Street" and Mushroom Records dutifully printed off the single's labels with "Accidently Kelly Street", a mistake they decided to keep. Australian musicologist, Ian McFarlane, felt it was a "summery, sugar pop single" which was accompanied by "a breezy, slightly kooky video clip."

The single was released in October 1992 ahead of their debut studio album, Marvin the Album, while in the United Kingdom, the song was not released until 25 April 1994. Hart described it as "a really happy song for me. It's about making all the right decisions and feeling really confident about yourself." As for the title, she recalled "The mis-spelling was deemed by some a genius stroke. Unfortunately, it was not intentional on my part, but I quietly took the credit for years." Austin remembered the track as "perfect pop craft of Tim O'Connor – An undeniable hit song, it was all over the radio for weeks, sweet and sure against the Pacific Northwest snarl and doof doof cuppa-tea. Some of the sourest people I know and love took me to task but you could see they couldn't help singing it as they railed. I would nod, smile, press their shoulders."

"Accidently Kelly Street" peaked at No. 4 on both the Australian and New Zealand singles charts as well as No. 80 on the UK Singles Chart. McFarlane noticed that "The band was so popular that television comedy troupe the D-Generation was compelled to produce a spot-on send-up of the video." According to Jeff Jenkins The Late Show's parody, "Accidentally Was Released", featuring Jane Kennedy, Tony Martin, Mick Molloy and Tom Gleisner (formerly of The D-Generation) was a "savage send-up of the Kelly Street video" and Hart "soon fell out of love with the song." Austin initially "had a real moment of feeling stabbed... Then I thought, 'You know what? It's an Australian thing.' I know all those guys and they mean it lovingly. To a certain extent, as an Australian, you just have to suck it up. And it's good. People don't allow you to get too full of yourself, or full of yourself at all, or even half full of yourself."

== Track listings ==
Australian 7-inch single

A. "Accidently Kelly Street"
B. "Ordinary Angels"

Australian CD and cassette single

1. "Accidently Kelly Street"
2. "Many Wings"
3. "Here You Come Again"
4. "Somethin' Stupid (Stoopid)"

UK CD single

1. "Accidently Kelly Street"
2. "Oh Brilliance"
3. "Ordinary Angels"
4. "Testimony"

== Credits and personnel ==
Credits are taken from the UK CD single liner notes.

Studio

- Recorded at Platinum Studios (Melbourne)

Personnel

- Tim O'Connor – writing, bass guitar
- Angie Hart – lead vocals
- Simon Austin – guitar, backing vocals
- Mark Picton – drums
- Frente! – production
- Michael Koppelman – production, mixing, recording

== Charts ==
=== Weekly charts ===
Chart (1992–1994)	Peak position
Australia (ARIA)	4
New Zealand (Recorded Music NZ)	4
UK Singles (Official Charts)	80

=== Year-end charts ===
Chart (1992)	Position
Australia (ARIA)	29

Chart (1993)	Position
Australia (ARIA)	87

== Certifications ==
Region	Certification	Certified units/sales
Australia (ARIA)	Platinum	70,000^{^}
^{^} Shipments figures based on certification alone.

== Release history ==
Region	Date	Format(s)	Label(s)	Ref.
Australia	26 October 1992	CD; cassette	White	
United Kingdom	25 April 1994	7-inch vinyl; CD; cassette	Mushroom	
