= Company of Strangers (band) =

Australian pop music group

- Origin: Melbourne, Victoria, Australia
- Genres: Rock; pop
- Years active: 1991–1993
- Labels: Sony
- Past members: Simon Hussey; Jef Scott; James Reyne; Daryl Braithwaite

Company of Strangers were a short-lived rock, pop music studio project formed by Simon Hussey in late 1991. The album featured performances by Daryl Braithwaite (ex-Sherbet) on vocals, Simon Hussey (ex-Cats Under Pressure, Australian Crawl) on keyboards, drums, engineering and production, Jef Scott on guitar and vocals, and James Reyne (ex-Australian Crawl) on vocals and guitar. Their debut self-titled album appeared in December 1992 via Sony Music Australia with Hussey producing. It peaked at No. 9 on the ARIA Albums Chart and was certified gold in 1993 for shipment of 35000 copies.

They released four singles, "Motor City (I Get Lost)" (July 1992), "Sweet Love" (November 1992), "Daddy's Gonna Make You a Star" (January 1993) and their cover version of the Beatles' "Baby, You're a Rich Man" (June 1993). Both "Motor City" and "Sweet Love" reached the ARIA Singles Chart top 30. At the ARIA Music Awards of 1993 Hussey won Producer of the Year for "Sweet Love", "Motor City" and "Daddy's Gonna Make You a Star"; and for "Nothing to Lose" for Braithwaite. Company of Strangers was also nominated for Breakthrough Artist - Album and "Motor City" was nominated for Breakthrough Artist – Single.

== Discography ==
=== Studio albums ===
Title	Album details	Peak chart positions		Certifications
Title	Album details	AUS	NZ	Certifications
Company of Strangers	Release date: 7 December 1992; Label: Sony Music Australia (472081.2, 472081.4); Formats: CD, MC	9	18	AUS: Gold

=== Singles ===
Title	Year	Peak chart positions		Certifications
Title	Year	AUS	NZ	Certifications
"Motor City (I Get Lost)"	1992	26	49	
"Sweet Love"	1992	21	12	
"Daddy's Gonna Make You a Star"	1993	35	18	
"Baby, You're a Rich Man"	1993	118	—	

== Awards and nominations ==
=== ARIA Music Awards ===
The ARIA Music Awards is an annual awards ceremony that recognises excellence, innovation, and achievement across all genres of Australian music. They commenced in 1987.

Year	Nominee / work	Award	Result	Ref.
1993	Company of Strangers	Breakthrough Artist - Album	Nominated	
1993	"Motor City (I Get Lost)"	Breakthrough Artist - Single	Nominated	
1993	Simon Hussey for "Daddy's Gonna Make You a Star", "Motor City (I Get Lost)" and "Sweet Love"	Producer of the Year	Won	
