= Angie Hart =

Australian singer

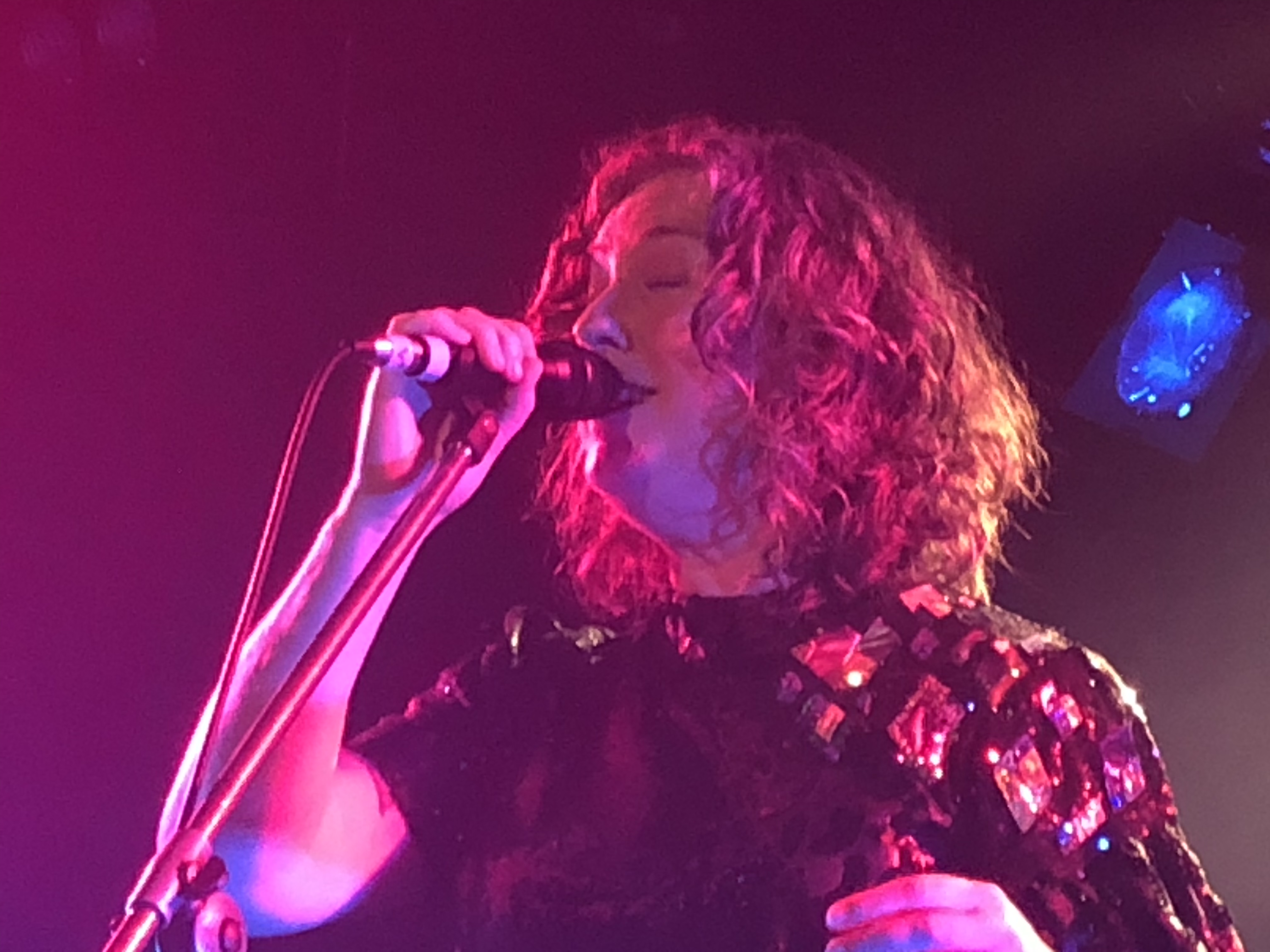
- Hart performing at Corner Hotel in Melbourne, May 2023

Background information
- Born: Angela Ruth Hart; Adelaide, South Australia, Australia
- Origin: Melbourne, Victoria, Australia
- Genres: Pop, indie pop, pop rock
- Occupation: Singer
- Years active: 1989–present
- Website: ihartangie.net

Angela Ruth Hart, billed as Angie Hart, is an Australian singer best known for her role as lead vocalist in the alternative pop rock band Frente! and the indie pop duo Splendid with her then-husband Jesse Tobias. Hart's solo career commenced in 2006 with the release of the album, Grounded Bird (2007).

== Early life ==
Born in Adelaide, South Australia, she has an older sister, Rebecca, also a musician. Her parents were Christians from a missionary background. The family moved to Tasmania while Hart was still a baby where they lived in a Christian commune until she was 10 years old. They then moved to Melbourne to join another commune where they remained until Hart was 15 when, with the separation of her parents, the family left the church altogether.

== Career ==
It was during her family disruption which led Hart to the Punters Club, a live music venue on Brunswick Street in Fitzroy. She frequented the venue to play pool and drink, though she was still under the legal drinking age. It often fell to bartender Simon Austin to eject her from the premises. Hart's older sister was also bartending at the Punters Club in 1989 and when Austin, a guitarist and songwriter, mentioned he was starting a band and looking for a singer, Becky Hart suggested her little sister Angie. Austin and Hart began writing songs together almost immediately, and with the already-recruited bass player Tim O'Connor and drummer Mark Picton, Frente! was born.

In 1990, she co-wrote the song "Marshall" with the Melbourne post-punk band Man in the Wood's bassist and drummer, Owen Bolwell and Stanley Paulzen. In 1991, the band, by then renamed to Tlot Tlot, recorded the song with Hart on vocals which appeared on the album A Day at the Bay. The song would be significantly rewritten several years later, retitled "Under the Water" and becoming a hit for Merril Bainbridge.

=== 1989–1997: Frente! ===
Frente! were formed in Melbourne in 1989 by Simon Austin on guitar and backing vocals, Tim O'Connor on bass guitar, Mark Picton on drums and recorder and Angie Hart on lead vocals.

In August 1991, Frente! self-released their debut EP, Whirled, which featured the song "Labour of Love". "Labour of Love" achieved national airplay on Australia's youth radio station Triple J and ranked highly in the Triple J Hottest 100, 1991. Subsequently, Frente! were signed to Mushroom Records' White label. In 1992, the group released the top 5 single "Accidently Kelly Street", top 5 EP Clunk and top 5 album Marvin the Album. The group won two ARIA Awards at the ARIA Music Awards of 1993.

In 1993 Hart gained brief fame and notoriety by posing near nude for Juice, a now-defunct Australian music magazine . Following an appearance on Home and Away in 1993, Hart, with the rest of Frente!, went overseas to pursue success in Europe and America and achieved success with the cover version of New Order's "Bizarre Love Triangle".

In 1995, Hart lent her vocal to the single "Tingly" by an Australian studio outfit, Pop! featuring Angie Hart. The song was peaked at number 92 on the ARIA Charts.

In March 1996 Hart appeared on the album More of Her by "Melbourne supergroup" Four Hours Sleep, with Frente's new bassist Bill McDonald, plus Stephen Cummings, Peter Luscombe and Dan Luscombe.

In July 1996, Frente! released their second studio album, Shape, which failed to match the success of their debut. Frente! embarked on a world tour to promote Shape, beginning in Australia in July 1996. In January 1997, following an appearance at Melbourne's Big Day Out, the band went their separate ways.

In 1997, Hart collaborated with The Angel for the single "Anything", before leaving Australia for the US.

=== 1998–2004: USA, Marriage and Splendid ===
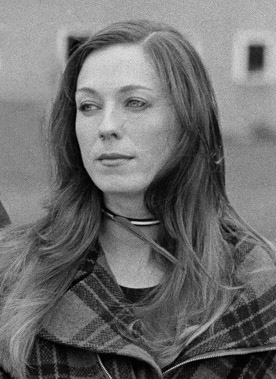
Hart in 1999

From 1998 to 2004, Hart performed as part of the pop duo Splendid with her then-husband, Jesse Tobias, whom she met August 1996 when Frente! was supporting Alanis Morissette in Canada. Tobias was Morissette's touring guitarist. Hart and Tobias were married on 22 March 1997 in Austin, Texas.

As Splendid, the duo released their debut album, Have You Got a Name for It, on 11 October 1999 in Australia. Due to the collapse of their US record company, Mammoth Records, immediately prior to the album's US release date, Have You Got a Name for It was never released outside of Australia.

In 2002, Hart recorded and performed the song "Blue" for the episode "Conversations with Dead People" of the television show Buffy the Vampire Slayer. The song was co-written by Hart with the show's creator, Joss Whedon. As part of Splendid, Hart twice appeared on the show, performing Splendid's songs "Charge" and "You and Me". Splendid's song "Tomorrow We'll Wake" was also aired on Buffy as background music to a scene featuring characters Xander and Anya. She also sang backing vocals on Tara's song, "Under Your Spell" in the musical episode "Once More, with Feeling", of which Tobias was co-music director.

Hart also appeared in Joss Whedon's short-lived TV series Firefly, playing the part of Lucy in "Heart of Gold". This part required Hart to perform "Amazing Grace" a cappella.

A second album was being produced but Hart and Tobias separated in September 2004 and later divorced. In December 2004, an EP, States of Awake, was released, featuring six of these recordings.

=== 2005–present: Frente EP, Solo career and Holidays On Ice ===
Hart returned to Australia in January 2005 and Frente! reformed to perform some Australian concerts. The line-up of Austin, Hart and McDonald were joined by Peter Luscombe on drums. The group issued a three-track EP, Try to Think Less, on Pop Boomerang Records.

In 2005, Hart became co-lead vocalist of the band Holidays on Ice, a project with Dean Manning, formerly of Leonardo's Bride. Holidays On Ice have released three albums: Playing Boyfriends And Girlfriends (2005), Pillage Before Plunder (2009), and The Luxury Of Wasted Space (2013).

In 2006, Hart relocated to Melbourne where she began work on a solo career. She appeared on Four Hours Sleep's second album Love Specifics, released in November 2006, where she again joined Bill McDonald, Stephen Cummings, and the Luscombe brothers.

Hart's debut solo single "Pictures of You" was released on Level Two Music. In 2007, Hart released "Cold Heart Killer", the lead single from her debut album, Grounded Bird released in September 2007 on ABC Music.

On 23 October 2009, Hart released her second studio album Eat My Shadow. At the ARIA Music Awards of 2010, the album was nominated for ARIA Award for Best Adult Contemporary Album.

Hart appeared on SBS One rock quiz show Rockwiz on 2 October 2010.

In March 2014, Four Hours Sleep released their eponymous third album featuring Hart, Cummings, McDonald, and the Luscombe brothers.

Hart appeared on ABC news satire show The Weekly with Charlie Pickering on 12 August 2015 singing the song "Hey Boy" with Miranda Tapsell and Geraldine Quinn.

In 2018, Hart was featured on the Ben Mastwyk single "Happiness".

== Private life ==
In 2025, Angie Hart publicly stated that she had been diagnosed with autism spectrum disorder (ASD) and attention deficit hyperactivity disorder (ADHD).

== Discography ==
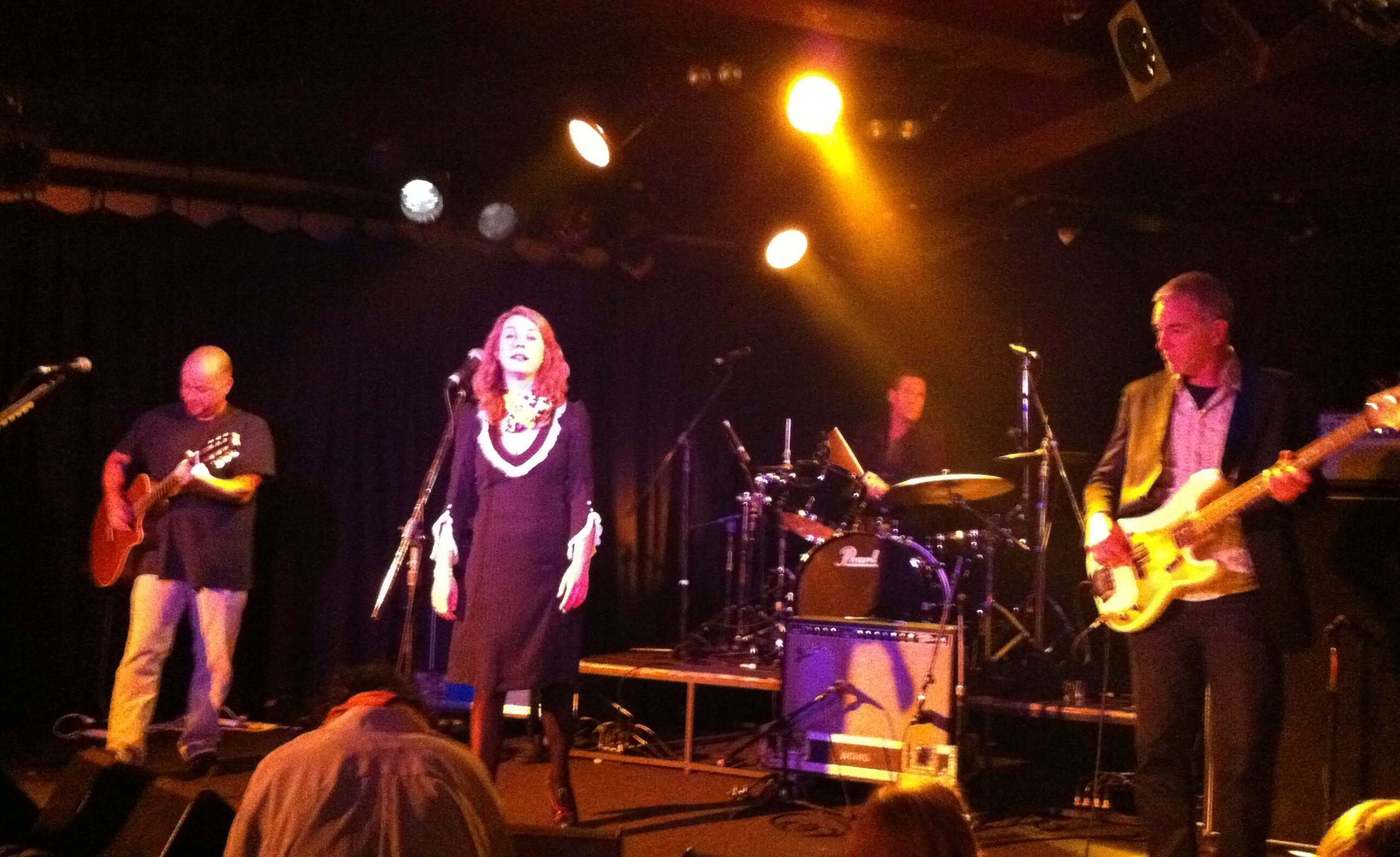
Hart performing with Frente! in 2010

=== Studio albums ===
List of albums, with selected chart positions
Title	Album details	Peak chart positions
Title	Album details	AUS
Grounded Bird	Released: September 2007; Label: ABC Music (5144235472); Format: CD	110
Eat My Shadow	Released: October 2009; Label: ABC Music (2719928); Format: CD	153

=== Singles ===
Year	Title	Peak chart positions	Album
Year	Title	AUS	Album
1995	"Tingly" (Pop! featuring Angie Hart)	92	non album single
1997	"Anything" (The Angel featuring Angie Hart)	-	non album single
2006	"Pictures of You"	166	non album single
2007	"Cold Heart Killer"	-	Grounded Bird
2007	"Care"	-	Grounded Bird
2009	"I'm Afraid of Fridays"	-	Eat My Shadow
2010	"Love Hating It"	-	non album single
2014	"Leap of Faith" (Diana Welshans featuring Angie Hart)	-	Goatfather (soundtrack)
2018	"Happiness" (Ben Mastwyk featuring Angie Hart)	-	Winning Streak (Ben Mastwyk album)

=== Other appearances ===
List of other non-single song appearances
Title	Year	Album
"Our House"	1994	Kate Ceberano and Friends
"Tap Your Heart" (with 60 Channels)	1998	Tuned In, Tuned On
"Give Me Your Love" (with 60 Channels)	1998	Tuned In, Tuned On
"Start Over" (with Abandoned Pools)	2001	Humanistic
"Suburban Muse" (with Abandoned Pools)	2001	Humanistic
"Sunny Day" (with Abandoned Pools)	2001	Humanistic
"Ruin Your Life" (with Abandoned Pools)	2001	Humanistic
"Black Rush" (with 60 Channels)	2004	Tuned In, Tuned On
"Still Burnin'" (with 60 Channels)	2004	Tuned In, Tuned On
"The Hardest Part" (with Cokelat)	2008	Panca Indera
"Our Boat Is Rocking on the Sea"	2011	ReWiggled – A Tribute to the Wiggles
"Little Bridges" (with Mark Seymour)	2011	Undertow
"When You Were Mine"	2014	Songs That Made Me
"Hymn to Her"	2014	Songs That Made Me
"Look at My Fruit" (with Die Roten Punkte)	2014	Eurosmash!
"Underground" (with Ben Lee)	2015	A Mixtape from Ben Lee
"There's a Tree in My Street" (with Benny Time)	2015	What a Beautiful Day
"River" (with RocKwiz Orkestra)	2015	The Christmas Album
"30 Seconds" (with Tracy Bonham)	2017	Modern Burdens
"The Bee Hut"	2018	Borrowed Verse
"Not the Same"	2018	Borrowed Verse
"Stick to My Fingers" (with Stephen Cummings)	2019	A Life is a Life – Anthology
