= Frente! =

Australian alternative rock band

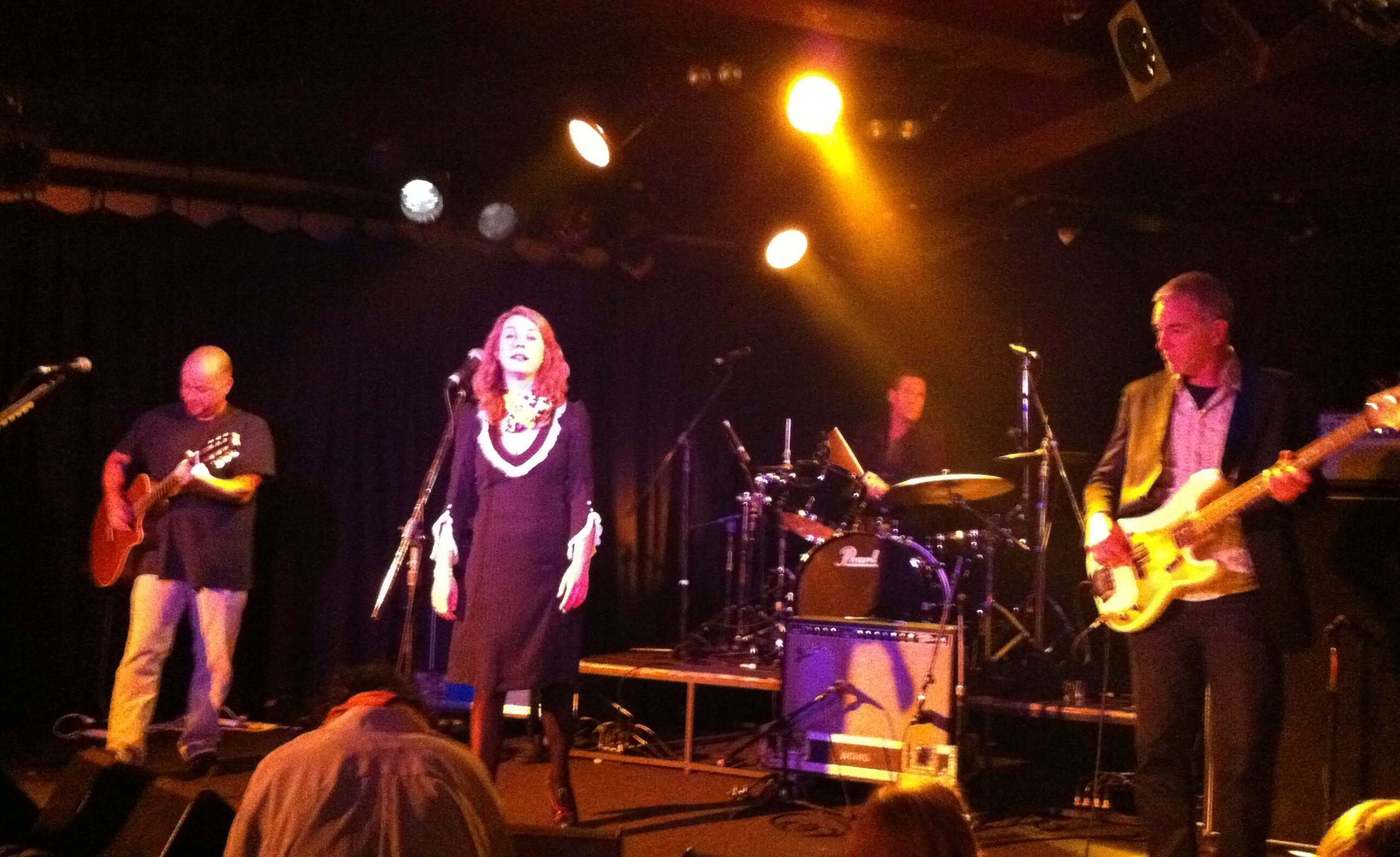
- Frente! performing at the Corner Hotel, Melbourne in 2010. From left to right: Simon Austin, Angie Hart, Pete Luscombe, Bill McDonald

Background information
- Origin: Melbourne, Victoria, Australia
- Genres: Indie pop; indie folk; alternative rock; soft rock
- Years active: 1989–1998, 2004–2005, 2010–2014, 2023–present
- Labels: Thumb Print, Mushroom, Mammoth
- Members: Simon Austin; Angie Hart
- Past members: Tim O'Connor; Mark Picton; Alastair Barden; Bill McDonald; Fraser Brindley; Jesse Tobias; Peter Luscombe

Frente! /frɛnteɪ/ (or Frente) is an Australian folk-pop and indie pop group which formed in 1989. The original line-up consisted of Simon Austin on guitar and backing vocals, Angie Hart on lead vocals, Tim O'Connor on bass guitar (later replaced by Bill McDonald), and Mark Picton on drums (later replaced by Alastair Barden, then by Peter Luscombe).

In August 1991, they issued their debut extended play Whirled, which included the track, "Labour of Love". In March 1992, they released a second EP, Clunk, with its featured track "Ordinary Angels", peaking at No. 3 on the ARIA Singles Chart. It was followed in October by "Accidently Kelly Street" (the unintentional misprint of "Accidentally Kelly Street" was retained) which reached No. 4. Their debut album, Marvin the Album, issued in November, peaked at No. 5 on the ARIA Albums Chart. "Labour of Love" was released as an EP outside of Australasia in 1994 as a CD single with a cover version of New Order's "Bizarre Love Triangle" included.

The band split up in 1998, but have reunited three times to date – most recently in 2014. Australian rock music historian Ian McFarlane wrote that the group's "quirky, irreverent, acoustic-based sound was at odds with the usual guitar-heavy, grunge trends of the day. The band's presentation had a tweeness about it that could have been off-putting if not for its genuine freshness and honesty".

== History ==
Frente! were formed in Melbourne, as "Frente" in 1989 by Simon Austin on guitar and backing vocals, Angie Hart on lead vocals, Tim O'Connor on bass guitar and Mark Picton on drums and recorder. The group were named after the Spanish word for 'forehead' and 'front', according to Inpress magazine "[i]t rhymes with 'heaven-sent-eh!'". The band spent two years performing in Melbourne's inner-city venues before, in August 1991, issuing their self-funded debut extended play, Whirled, on the Thumb Print label. It was produced and engineered by Owen Bolwell at Whirled Records in Richmond. Hart explained that the exclamation mark was added for the CD's cover art "[w]e don't write our name like that, but we thought we would on the CD covers because it looks good". One of Whirled's eight tracks, "Labour of Love", was voted by Triple J listeners to No. 69 on their Hottest 100 for 1991. "Labour of Love" was co-written by Austin and Hart.

Frente! signed with Mushroom Records's White Label which issued their second EP, Clunk, in March 1992. It featured the track, "Ordinary Angels", and peaked at No. 3 on the ARIA Singles Chart. It was certified gold by ARIA for shipment of 35,000 copies. In October 1992, they released a single, "Accidently Kelly Street" (sic), which reached No. 4 and was certified platinum for shipment of 70,000 units. McFarlane described it as a "summery sugar-pop" tune with a "breezy, slightly kooky video clip". O'Connor had written the track after moving to Kenny Street but incorrectly told his friends he was going to Kelly Street; the record label misspelt the first word but the group decided to keep the error and its lower case. Initially Hart was positive about the track, "[i]t's a really happy song for me. It's about making all the right decisions and feeling really confident about what you're doing". Hart changed her mind after it was parodied on TV's The Late Show as "Accidentally Was Released" – in 2005 she reiterated, "I still hate it".

On 24 November 1992, their debut album, Marvin the Album, was released, which peaked at No. 5 on the ARIA Albums Chart. It was produced by Daniel Denholm (Club Hoy), Michael Koppelman (Prince) and the band. The album was certified platinum in Australia. On the ARIA End of Year Charts for 1992 "Ordinary Angels" was placed at No. 20 and "Accidently Kelly Street" was placed at No. 29. At the ARIA Music Awards of 1993 the group won 'Breakthrough Artist – Album' for Marvin the Album and 'Breakthrough Artist – Single' for "Ordinary Angels". The album was also nominated for 'Best Cover Art' (by Hart and Louise Beach) and "Ordinary Angels" was nominated for 'Best Video' (directed by Robbie Douglas-Turner). Another single, "No Time", was released in February 1993, and peaked at No. 50 in March. In July that year, Hart appeared nude for a cover story in Juice, with carefully positioned beads and her hand. By that time Alastair Barden (ex-King Idiot, Maelstrom) had replaced Picton on drums.

In 1994, Frente! toured Europe and the US to promote the international version of Marvin the Album on Mammoth Records. AllMusic's Alex Henderson felt that "after several listens, one starts to realize just how strong this abstract pop-folk-rock release is". Mammoth had also issued a seven-track extended play, Labour of Love. This included their acoustic cover version of New Order's 1986 hit, "Bizarre Love Triangle", which reached No. 76 in the UK – following releases of earlier tracks: "Ordinary Angels" which did not chart, and "Accidently Kelly Street" which reached No. 80. "Bizarre Love Triangle" appeared in Australia on a re-issued version of Lonely EP in May 1994 which peaked at No. 7 on the ARIA Singles Chart – the first issue had charted at No. 88 in February. In the US, "Bizarre Love Triangle" peaked at No. 10 on Billboard's Modern Rock Tracks chart and No. 49 on the Billboard Hot 100. The US re-release of "Labour of Love" managed No. 9 on the Modern Rock Tracks chart. "Ordinary Angels" appeared on the 1994 soundtrack for the US TV series Melrose Place. By year's end, due to constant touring, O'Connor left and was replaced on bass guitar by Bill McDonald (ex-Hot Half Hour, Deborah Conway Band, Rebecca's Empire).

In early 1995, Hart recorded vocals for an Australian single, "Tingly", by Pop! released in November, which reached No. 92. Frente! has a track on a compilation album, Saturday Morning: Cartoons' Greatest Hits (5 December 1995), a cover version of "Open Up Your Heart (and Let the Sunshine In)". During 1995, Frente! recorded their second album, Shape, in Spain with Ted Niceley (Fugazi), David M. Allen (The Cure, Sisters of Mercy), Cameron McVey a.k.a. Booga Bear (Neneh Cherry) and the band producing. The first single, "Sit on My Hands", peaked at No. 66 in Australia in July 1996. The second single, "What's Come Over Me" peaked at No. 116 in Australia, and No. 77 in the UK. The album was issued in July 1996, peaking at No. 35 on the ARIA Albums Chart. McFarlane felt it was "more sophisticated and textured than its naive (yet still classy) predecessor". Allmusic's Stephen Thomas Erlewine noted the group "experiment with trancy instrumental overtones and languid trip-hop beats ... Certain melodic lines slip out of the pleasant mist while the album is playing, but nothing is memorable after the record is finished".

During 1996, the group toured Europe, Asia and US for three months to promote the album. They used Fraser Brindley on keyboards while touring. John Everson of Illinois Entertainer, interviewed Hart in September and described Austin as her "on-again, off-again boyfriend", Hart detailed "Simon and I had a lot of shit to work out. We went out for a while and then we broke up and then we went on tour. It goes in and out of being fine." In Canada in August, and then Australia during December, they supported Alanis Morissette on her tour, promoting Jagged Little Pill. Morissette's guitarist, Jesse Tobias, became Hart's boyfriend. In January 1997, Frente! performed on the Melbourne leg of the Big Day Out, in July that year they issued another CD single, "Goodbye Goodguy". Tobias had joined Frente! for their final tour before the band broke up late in 1997 – Hart and Tobias married and formed a duo, Splendid.

=== Post break-up appearances ===
In late 2003, Frente! founders Austin and Hart, who were both living in the US, resumed song writing together. One of their new compositions, "Sleeping", appeared on Splendid's EP, States of Awake (2004). During late 2004, Austin and Hart reformed Frente! for acoustic shows in both New York and Los Angeles. In January 2005, Frente! performed some Australian east coast dates, the line-up of Austin, Hart, and McDonald were joined by Pete Luscombe on drums. The group issued a three-track EP, Try to Think Less, on Pop Boomerang Records. On 28 November 2010, Frente! played at a Punters Club reunion show at the Corner Hotel, curated by Hart. The show also featured other early 1990s Melbourne bands: The Glory Box, The Hollowmen and The Fauves. In 2011, Frente! performed at the Brisbane Festival in the Speigeltent.

In March 2014, it was announced that Austin and Hart will tour as Frente!, performing nine concerts around Australia during May and June 2014 to mark the 21st anniversary of Marvin the Album. A special two CD anniversary edition of the album was also released on 16 May.

In March 2023, Frente! performed at MordiFest as part of the leadup to the 30th anniversary of Marvin the Album. Hart and Austin were joined by Tamara Murphy on electric bass guitar, Sophie Koh on keyboards and melodica, and Ben Wiesner on drums. The group also performed at the Castlemaine State Festival, at which O'Connor briefly joined the band on bass for "Accidently Kelly Street".

Frente! was selected as one of the bands as part of the Mushroom 50 Concert, celebrating 50 years of Mushroom Records with fifty songs for fifty years. Frente! performed Ordinary Angels in front of the live audience at Rod Laver Arena on 26 November 2023.

On 31 August 2024, Frente! performed at the reopened Punters Club.

== In popular culture ==
"Accidently Kelly Street" was parodied by The Late Show, featuring Jane Kennedy, Tony Martin, Mick Molloy and Santo Cilauro. The parody was named "Accidentally Was Released". The song "Jungle" from Shape featured in an episode of the British television series Teachers. The band also guested in Home and Away in 1993, episode 1202. The song "Accidently Kelly Street" was featured in the 2002 Taiwanese film Blue Gate Crossing.

Their cover of "Bizarre Love Triangle" was one of Stephen Merchant's "Song for the Ladies" on The Ricky Gervais Show.

“Book Song" was featured on the soundtrack of the American television series My So-Called Life.

“Ordinary Angels” aired on American television series Melrose Place and was featured on the soundtrack album.

== Discography ==
=== Studio albums ===
List of studio albums, with selected chart positions and certifications
| Title | Album details | Peak chart positions | | | | | Certifications (sales thresholds) |
| Title | Album details | AUS | NZ | US 200 | US Heat | UK | Certifications (sales thresholds) |
|---|---|---|---|---|---|---|---|
| Marvin the Album | Released: 24 November 1992; Label: Mushroom / White Records Label (MUSH32106.2); Formats: CD | 5 | 4 | 75 | 1 | — | ARIA: Platinum; MC: Gold |
| Shape | Released: 15 July 1996; Label: Mushroom (MUSH32107.2), Mammoth (MR0123); Formats: CD, cassette | 35 | — | — | — | 109 | |
"—" denotes a recording that did not chart or was not released in that territory.

=== Live albums ===
List of live albums, with selected details
| Title | Album details |
|---|---|
| Live at Fez, New York 2004 | Released: 2014; Label: Frente!; Formats: Digital download |

=== Extended plays ===
List of extended plays, with selected chart positions
| Title | EP details | Peak chart positions | | | Certifications |
| Title | EP details | AUS | NZ | US Heat | Certifications |
|---|---|---|---|---|---|
| Whirled | Released: August 1991; Label: Thumbprint (THUMB:1); Formats: CD | 63^{[a]} | — | — | |
| Clunk | Released: March 1992; Label: Mushroom / White Records Label (d11125); Formats: CD | 3^{[b]} | 30 | — | ARIA: Gold |
| Labour of Love | Released: 1993; Label: Mammoth (MR0056); Formats: CD, cassette | — | — | 10 | |
| Lonely | Released: May 1994; Label: White Records Label (d11781); Formats: CD | 7^{[c]} | — | — | ARIA: Gold |
"—" denotes a recording that did not chart or was not released in that territory.

=== Singles ===
List of singles, with selected chart positions and certifications, showing year released and album name
| Title | Year | Peak chart positions | | | | | Certifications | Album |
| Title | Year | AUS | NZ | UK | US | US Alt | Certifications | Album |
|---|---|---|---|---|---|---|---|---|
| "Accidently Kelly Street" | 1992 | 4 | 4 | 80 | — | — | ARIA: Platinum | Marvin the Album |
| "No Time" | 1993 | 50 | — | — | — | — | | Marvin the Album |
| "Ordinary Angels" (North America and Europe only) | 1993 | —^{[b]} | — | — | — | — | | Marvin the Album |
| "Lonely"^{[c]} | 1994 | 88^{[c]} | — | — | — | — | | Lonely (EP) (Australia) |
| "Bizarre Love Triangle" | 1994 | 7^{[c]} | — | 76 | 49 | 10 | | Lonely (EP) (Australia) / Labour of Love (EP) |
| "Labour of Love" | 1994 | —^{[a]} | — | — | 106 | 9 | | Lonely (EP) (Australia) / Labour of Love (EP) |
| "Sit on My Hands" | 1996 | 66 | — | — | — | — | | Shape |
| "Horrible" | 1996 | — | — | 163 | — | — | | Shape |
| "What's Come Over Me" | 1996 | 116 | — | 83 | — | — | | Shape |
| "Goodbye Goodguy" | 1997 | 197 | — | — | — | — | | Shape |
| "Jungle" | 1998 | — | — | — | — | — | | Shape |
| "Try to Think Less" | 2005 | — | — | — | — | — | | single only |
"—" denotes a recording that did not chart or was not released in that territory.

- a "Labour of Love" was used to promote the Whirled EP release in Australia. Despite being an EP, Whirled charted on the Australian albums chart.
- b "Ordinary Angels" was used to promote the Clunk EP release in Australia.
- c "Lonely" was initially released as a 3-track single in Australia in January 1994, when it peaked at number 88. It was re-packaged as a 5-track EP with "Bizarre Love Triangle" added and used to promote the EP in May 1994, when it peaked at number 7.

== Awards and nominations ==
=== ARIA Music Awards ===
The ARIA Music Awards is an annual awards ceremony that recognises excellence, innovation, and achievement across all genres of Australian music. They commenced in 1987. Frente! have won two awards.

| Year | Nominee / work | Award | Result | Ref. |
|---|---|---|---|---|
| 1993 | Marvin the Album | Breakthrough Artist - Album | Won | |
| 1993 | "Ordinary Angels" | Breakthrough Artist - Single | Won | |
| 1993 | "Accidently Kelly Street" | Highest Selling Single | Nominated | |
| 1993 | Robbie Douglas-Turner for Frente! "Ordinary Angels" | Best Video | Nominated | |
| 1993 | Angie Hart and Louise Beach for Frente! Marvin the Album | Best Cover Art | Nominated | |
| 1996 | John Hillcoat and Polly Borland for Frente! "Sit on My Hands" | Best Video | Nominated | |
