= Baby, You're a Rich Man =

- American picture sleeve (reverse)

Single by the Beatles
- A-side: "All You Need Is Love"
- Released: 7 July 1967
- Recorded: 11 May 1967
- Studio: Olympic Sound, London
- Genre: Psychedelic pop, psychedelic rock
- Length: 3:03
- Label: Parlophone, Capitol
- Songwriter: Lennon–McCartney
- Producer: George Martin

The Beatles singles chronology
"Strawberry Fields Forever" / "Penny Lane" (1967)	"All You Need Is Love" / "Baby, You're a Rich Man" (1967)	"Hello, Goodbye" (1967)

"Baby, You're a Rich Man" is a song by the English rock band the Beatles that was released as the B-side of their "All You Need Is Love" single in July 1967. It originated from an unfinished song by John Lennon, titled "One of the Beautiful People", to which Paul McCartney added a chorus. It is one of the best-known pop songs to make use of a clavioline, a monophonic keyboard instrument that was a forerunner to the synthesizer. Lennon played the clavioline on its oboe setting, creating a sound that suggests an Indian shehnai. The song was recorded and mixed at Olympic Sound Studios in London, making it the first of the Beatles' EMI recordings to be entirely created outside EMI Studios.

Lennon wrote his portion of the song after attending the 14 Hour Technicolor Dream, an all-night festival held at London's Alexandra Palace that served as a key event in the emergence of the counterculture in the UK. His lyrics address the "beautiful people" of the 1960s hippie movement and combine with the chorus to present a statement on the universality of non-material wealth. The lyrics have also invited interpretation as a message to the Beatles' manager, Brian Epstein, and alternatively as a comment on fame. George Harrison performed the song during his visit to San Francisco's Haight-Ashbury district in August 1967, at the height of the Summer of Love. The track later appeared on the US Magical Mystery Tour album. Parts of it were used in their 1968 animated film Yellow Submarine.

"Baby, You're a Rich Man" peaked at number 34 on America's Billboard Hot 100 chart. Among reviewers' varied comments on the song, Billboard admired it as "an Eastern-flavored rocker with an infectious beat and an intricate lyric", while Pitchfork has dismissed it as "a second-rate take on John Lennon's money-isn't-everything theme". In 2010, Rolling Stone ranked "Baby, You're a Rich Man" at number 68 on its list of the "100 Greatest Beatles Songs". The Fat Boys, Marilyn Manson (band), Kula Shaker and the Presidents of the United States of America are among the artists who have covered the song. The Beatles recording was used at the end of the 2010 film The Social Network, about the rise of Facebook.

== Background ==
That's a combination of two separate pieces ... put together and forced into one song. One half was all mine. [Sings] "How does it feel to be one of the beautiful people, now that you know who you are, da da da da." Then Paul comes in with [sings] "Baby, you're a rich man," which was a lick he had around.

— John Lennon, 1980

"Baby, You're a Rich Man" was the result of combining two unfinished songs written by Lennon and McCartney, in a similar fashion to "A Day in the Life" and "I've Got a Feeling". The working title, based on Lennon's verses, was "One of the Beautiful People", to which McCartney added the "Baby, you're a rich man" chorus. In a 1980 interview, Lennon described it as "two separate pieces ... forced into one song". The two songwriters worked on the composition at McCartney's London home, on Cavendish Avenue in St John's Wood.

During the 1960s, "beautiful people" was the term adopted by Californian hippies to refer to themselves. According to author Barry Miles, who was among the leading figures in the UK underground in 1967, Lennon drew inspiration for the song from newspaper articles on the emerging hippie phenomenon. It is thought that McCartney wrote his section about the band's manager, Brian Epstein. Lennon's lyrics are in the form of a question-and-answer exchange, similar to that used by him and McCartney in "With a Little Help from My Friends". Musicologist Walter Everett writes that the song "asks an unnamed Brian Epstein what it's like to be one of the 'beautiful people'"; Everett adds: "This appellation was used of both communal hippies and those who mingle with the most celebrated entertainers." Lennon claimed that the meaning of the song was that everybody is a rich man, saying, "The point was stop moaning. You're a rich man and we're all rich men." George Harrison said the message was that all individuals are wealthy within themselves, regardless of material concerns. (Note: Speaking about the song in 1987, Harrison said that, given the Beatles' influence during the 1960s, "the idea was to show that we, being rich and famous and having all these experiences, had realized that there was a greater thing to be got out of life – and what's the point of having that on your own? You want all your friends and everyone else to do it, too.")

According to author and critic Ian MacDonald, Lennon was most likely inspired to write the verses after attending the 14 Hour Technicolor Dream, an all-night festival held at Alexandra Palace in north London on 29 April 1967. Attended by 10,000 people, this musical and performance art event was a fundraiser for the proprietors of the underground newspaper International Times, after a police raid had forced the closure of their offices; in MacDonald's description, it marked the first large-scale coming together of Britain's "beautiful people". Writing in 1981 on the musical and societal developments of 1967, sociomusicologist Simon Frith said that this event was one of the "multi-media happenings" that reflected the new aesthetic represented by English psychedelia, whereby "Dancing became less important than listening" and fashion embraced vivid colours while retaining "the mod concern for looking smart". Frith added: "Psychedelia was essentially elitist but the joy of psychedelic pop was that it made everyone part of the elite."

== Composition ==
The song's principal key is G major in mixolydian mode, and the time signature throughout is 4/4. Its structure comprises an intro, two verses and a chorus, followed by a third verse and repeated choruses. From its opening chord of G major, the verses introduce a ♭VII/I (F^{add9}/G), a chord change that constitutes a pedal point on G (sustained harmonic tone) and so recalls some of the Beatles' Indian-inspired melodies from Revolver. Among musicologists, Everett says that from the seventh bar of the verse, C major is revealed as the true key, whereas Alan Pollack writes that the emphasis given to C major at the end of the musical phrases instead suggests "a perilously high center of gravity with respect to G being the home key". (Note: Pollack also recognises the sustained G note in the bass line, despite the chord change, which creates "the drone-like harmonic style of songs such as 'Rain'".) The Indian influence is heightened on the band's recording of the song through the use of gamak melodies in the accompaniment. Pollack considers a notable aspect of the chorus to be the bass move from C to G via a ♭III (B♭). According to MacDonald, the song's loose, swinging rhythm, which he describes as "chugging pseudo-march", suggests the influence of the Four Tops' 1966 hit single "Reach Out I'll Be There". (Note: Following the Beatles' decision to retire from touring in 1966, Epstein had organised for the Four Tops to play at one of his pop presentations at the Saville Theatre, shortly before "Reach Out I'll Be There" topped the UK charts. He went on to present their UK tour the following year.)

Author and critic Kenneth Womack comments that the lyrics appear to "address issues of wealth and celebrity" for listeners unfamiliar with the countercultural concept of "beautiful people". The song reflects the Beatles' disdain for consumerism and materialism, a theme that, inspired by the band members' use of the hallucinogenic drug LSD, they introduced in the lyrics to Revolver tracks such as "And Your Bird Can Sing". Authors Russell Reising and Jim LeBlanc highlight the lines "You keep all your money in a big brown bag inside a zoo / What a thing to do" as particularly dismissive of the acquisition and hoarding of material wealth. The same authors recognise an element of ridicule towards some of the "beautiful people", specifically those that, in Lennon's words, travel no further than "As far as the eye can see" and, even then, see "Nothing that doesn't show". Music critic Tim Riley identifies a droll quality in the answers that Lennon provides to his own questions. With regard to the song's message, he writes: "It's clear that they understand their position: if the Beatles are beautiful people, by extension their listeners become beautiful people ('Baby, you're a rich man, too')."

== Recording ==
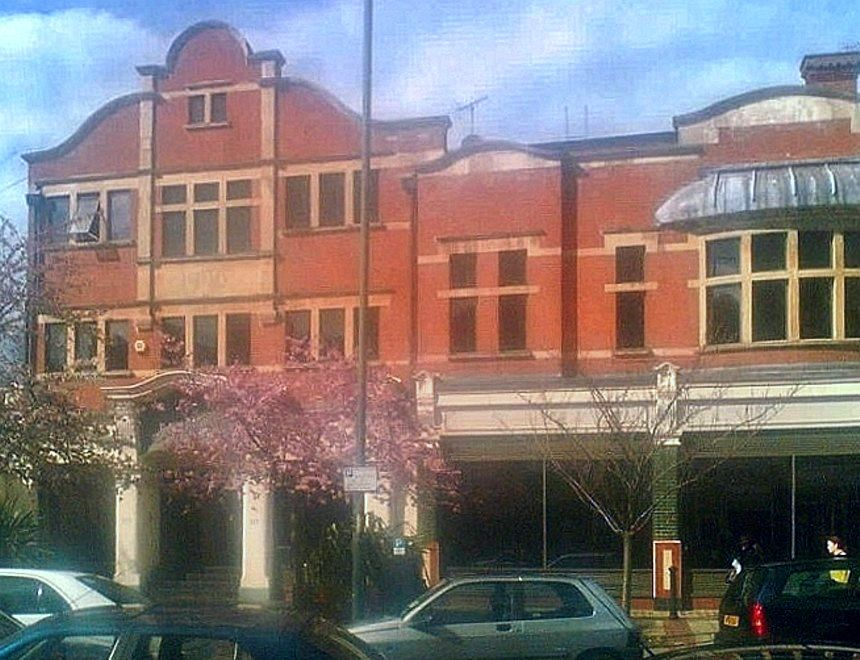
The Beatles recorded the song at Olympic Sound Studios. According to author Mark Lewisohn, "Baby, You're a Rich Man" was "the first Beatles song to be recorded and mixed for record entirely outside of [EMI Studios]".

The recording of "Baby, You're a Rich Man" took place during a period when, free of deadlines following the completion of their album Sgt. Pepper's Lonely Hearts Club Band in April 1967, the Beatles worked on songs for the United Artists animated film Yellow Submarine and for what became the band's television film Magical Mystery Tour. They recorded "Baby, You're a Rich Man" in a six-hour session, starting at 9 pm on 11 May, at Olympic Sound Studios in Barnes, south-west London. The session marked a rare example of the Beatles recording outside of EMI's facility at Abbey Road, after the band had briefly used Regent Sound in central London during the sessions for Sgt. Pepper. The engineers assisting George Martin, the Beatles' producer, were Olympic manager Keith Grant and Eddie Kramer. Mick Jagger, whose band the Rolling Stones regularly used the same studio, also attended the session.

The song was mixed, in mono only, that same day. The music features an unusual oboe-like sound reminiscent of an Indian shehnai, which was created with a clavioline, an early, three-octave forerunner of the synthesizer. Being a monophonic keyboard, it was capable of sounding only one note at a time; according to music journalist Gordon Reid, citing a report from the session, Lennon created the trill sound "by rolling an orange up and down the keyboard" of the clavioline. Musicologist William Echard cites the clavioline part as an example of a psychedelic feature he calls a "garble line" – a musical part that "often meanders widely through pitch space, following a rhythmic profile that does not adhere strongly to the prevailing harmonic or melodic logic" – with "Orientalist connotations". (Note: Other examples of Orientalist "garble" lines, according to Echard, are the lead guitar part on the Byrds' "Eight Miles High", some of the tape loops used on the Beatles' "Tomorrow Never Knows", and the title track to Prince's 1985 album Around the World in a Day.) A feedback delay effect known as spin-echo was used to fill from the end of one line of the verse to the start of the next. After Lennon had played piano on the basic track, McCartney overdubbed a second part, which enters at 1:45 and is heard in reverse over the third verse. In its doubling of the vocal line, Harrison's lead guitar mirrors the role of a sarangi in an Indian khyal vocal piece, an effect that Harrison first used on Lennon's song "Lucy in the Sky with Diamonds".

Following the completion of Sgt. Pepper in late April 1967, the Beatles' recording sessions for the remainder of that year have been dismissed as uninspired by the majority of commentators. (Note: According to the group's recording historian, Mark Lewisohn, their efforts "display a startling lack of cohesion and enthusiasm", while MacDonald cites the band members' drug intake and over-reliance on random events for inspiration.) Kramer contests this view, however; he says of the Beatles' collaboration on "Baby, You're a Rich Man": "The energy level was so intense … that you were riding wave upon wave of amazing creativity. It was like watching a well-oiled machine. Just incredible." According to another Olympic staff engineer, Grant and Kramer were highly complimentary of Lennon as a vocalist and "couldn't believe anyone could sing that well". Aside from the clavioline part, overdubs on the track included maracas and tambourine, and vibraphone played by Kramer. Only a single note of the vibraphone is clearly audible throughout the track, at the 0:53 mark. McCartney recalled the six-hour session as an energetic one and "rather exciting", adding: "Keith Grant mixed it, instantly, right there. He stood up at the console as he mixed it, so it was a very exciting mix, we were really quite buzzed." (Note: Grant's time-conscious approach as the recording engineer contributed to the efficiency of the session. He told Lewisohn in 1987, "I'm a terrible pusher on sessions", and recalled the Beatles telling him that they usually worked at a "much more leisurely pace".)

During the session, it has been written that Lennon changed a line in one repeat of the chorus to "Baby, you're a rich fag Jew". According to author Bob Spitz, this was either a joke at the expense of Epstein or a provocation in reaction to the band's former moptop image. However, there has been no evidence brought forth of this actually being in the song during a session or as released. Spitz writes that the session tapes also reveal Lennon improvising similarly "wicked" remarks about McCartney, Ringo Starr and Jagger. Partly as a result of these kinds of disruptions, the Beatles required twelve takes before they achieved a satisfactory rhythm track. The group enjoyed working at Olympic Sound, which was an independent facility, free of record company control. They returned to Barnes on 14 June to record the basic track for "All You Need Is Love". (Note: As a further example of the closeness between the Rolling Stones, particularly Jagger, and the Beatles at this time, Jagger, Keith Richards and Marianne Faithfull were among the crowd of friends who sang on "All You Need Is Love". Lennon and McCartney also contributed vocals to the Stones' single "We Love You", which was recorded at Olympic in mid June 1967.)

== Release ==
"Baby, You're a Rich Man" was initially submitted for inclusion in Yellow Submarine. While parts of the song were used in the film, its initial release was as the B-side of "All You Need Is Love", which the Beatles performed on the Our World satellite broadcast on 25 June 1967 and then rush-released as a single. The release took place on 7 July in the United Kingdom and on 17 July in the United States. "All You Need Is Love" topped singles charts in many countries around the world. In the United States, the B-side also charted in its own right, peaking at number 34 on the Billboard Hot 100 and number 60 on the Cash Box Top 100. In Australia, it was listed with "All You Need Is Love", as a double A-side, when the single topped the Go-Set national chart.

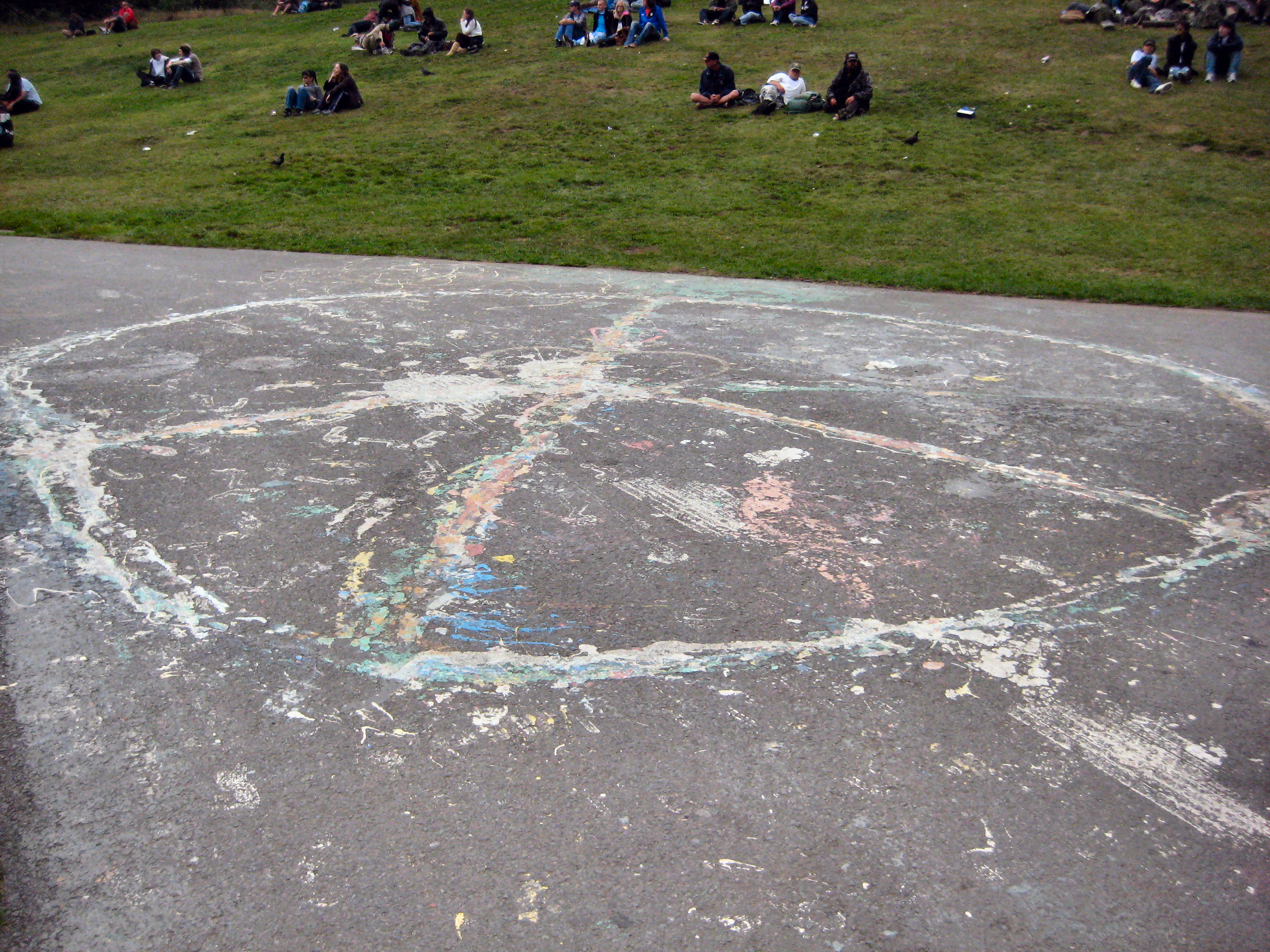
Peace symbol drawn on a walkway at Hippie Hill in San Francisco's Golden Gate Park. Harrison busked the song at the hill during his visit to Haight-Ashbury in August 1967.

The single followed soon after Sgt. Pepper, which historian David Simonelli describes as "the most important cultural moment of 1967" through its resonance "across every boundary of class, age, gender, race and geography". Both records provided a soundtrack to that year's Summer of Love, a phenomenon that marked the full emergence of the 1960s counterculture. The Beatles were viewed as leaders of the counterculture and, during July and August, pursued interests related to the same utopian-based ideology. (Note: At Lennon's insistence, the Beatles spent a week in the Aegean Sea off Greece, in July 1967, searching for an island that could serve as a commune for themselves, their families and members of their inner circle. In the Beatles' 1995 Anthology television series, "Baby, You're a Rich Man" plays over footage of this visit to the Greek islands.) In a 1970 interview, when asked about Haight-Ashbury, the district of San Francisco that represented "the city of the beautiful people" in 1967, Lennon recalled that he was "all for going and living" there, but "George went over in the end." During this visit, on 7 August, Harrison was handed an acoustic guitar in Golden Gate Park and briefly performed "Baby, You're a Rich Man", leading a crowd around in a manner that press reports likened to the Pied Piper of Hamelin.

Although the visit was viewed as the Beatles' endorsement of a youth movement that they helped inspire, Harrison was disappointed at how Haight-Ashbury represented a haven for dropouts and drug addicts, rather than a community looking to explore the possibility of enlightenment that LSD presented. On his return to London, he shared this disillusionment with Lennon. The pair subsequently became avid supporters of Maharishi Mahesh Yogi's Transcendental Meditation technique, after the Beatles had attended a seminar by the Maharishi in Bangor, Wales, where they publicly disavowed LSD on 26 August. In light of this development, author Nicholas Schaffner wrote that "Baby, You're a Rich Man", like "Strawberry Fields Forever", revealed the "redundant" aspect of repeated LSD "trips" after the initial sense of spiritual euphoria awakened by the drug, in that the songs "tend[ed] to provide more riddles than solutions".

Against the Beatles' wishes, Capitol Records, EMI's North American affiliate, included "Baby You're a Rich Man" and other tracks from the band's 1967 singles on the US album Magical Mystery Tour, released in November that year. (Note: In Britain and other markets, Magical Mystery Tour was originally a double EP release, consisting only of the songs from the television film. Because of the difficulty in marketing EPs in the US, Capitol expanded the content to form an LP, with the non-album singles tracks filling side two.) In the company's rush to prepare the album, a duophonic (or "mock stereo") mix of the song was used for the stereo version of the LP. While parts of the song were used in the 1968 film Yellow Submarine, it was not included on the accompanying soundtrack album. The sequence for "Baby, You're a Rich Man" appears towards the end of the film, when Sgt. Pepper's Lonely Hearts Club Band have been released from the paralysis initiated by the Blue Meanies' hatred of music. Later editions of the US single include a voice saying the end of the word "Seven" or "Eleven" before the track starts.

== Critical reception ==
Writing in the NME in July 1967, Derek Johnson commented on the song's modern qualities relative to the sing-along style of the A-side. He highlighted Lennon's falsetto singing, the recording's "Oriental instrumentation and … unusual shuffle beat, emphasised by handclaps", and concluded: "The whole effect is startling and packed with interest from the word go." Billboard's reviewer described it as "an Eastern-flavored rocker with an infectious beat and an intricate lyric". In one of the first cultural essays to acknowledge the Beatles' impact on American culture in a meaningful way, for the journal Partisan Review, Richard Poirier cited both sides of the single as a "particularly brilliant example" of how contemporary British rock bands had "restor[ed] to good standing ... the simplicities that have frightened us into irony and the search for irony". He described the musical backing on "Baby, You're a Rich Man" as "bursts of sitar music and the clip-clopping of Indian song", which combined to "operate in the manner of classical allusion in Pope", and he admired the lyrics' satirical quality, saying that they were superior to Lennon's Edward Lear-inspired poetry writing. (Note: According to author Jonathan Bellman, Poirier's comments also had an adverse effect on the public's perception of Transcendental Meditation, which became inadvertently linked with rock music, the sitar and LSD. Poirier said that whereas the Beatles' "sitar music" on Sgt. Pepper had represented India in the form of the Bhagavad Gita, on "Baby, You're a Rich Man" it evoked "another India, of fabulous riches, the India of the British and their Maharajahs, a place for exotic travel, but also for josh sticks and the otherworldliness of 'the trip'".)

Nobody thought that Baby You're A Rich Man was about money. And how did it feel to be one of the beautiful people? When we listened to The Beatles, we all were … This music was nothing if not inclusive.

— Music critic Charles Shaar Murray, 2002

In his feature article on the clavioline for Sound on Sound magazine, Gordon Reid pairs the song with the Tornados' 1962 hit "Telstar" as the two seminal pop recordings made with the instrument. In his assessment of "Baby, You're a Rich Man", Ian MacDonald welcomes the use of clavioline, saying that it evokes "a beguiling joss-stick exoticism", and he praises Starr's drumming as the equal of his performance on the song "Rain". MacDonald bemoans the lack of focus evident in this and other Beatles recordings from the immediate post-Sgt. Pepper period, however; he says that, while "Baby, You're a Rich Man" demonstrates the band's command of musical "feel" and "black-white acid-dance fusion" a year ahead of the Rolling Stones, McCartney's choruses are weak and, overall, the song is devoid of "well-crafted music". Tim Riley says that the July 1967 single offers two pieces that are "Not such bad notions in themselves, except that they sound spent." Riley criticises the song's lyrics as "lacking in purpose" and says that, although the "snake-charming Clavioline" provides a degree of interest, "There's no center to this music … 'Help!' and 'Drive My Car' addressed the fallacies of fame from cynical impulses; 'Baby, You're a Rich Man' flounders in privileged emptiness."

Writing for Mojo in 2003, Martin O'Gorman paired "Baby, You're a Rich Man" with Harrison "It's All Too Much" as two of the Beatles' "most sonically intriguing, but unfocused tracks". In a 2009 review of Magical Mystery Tour, Scott Plagenhoef of Pitchfork dismissed the song as "a second-rate take on John Lennon's money-isn't-everything theme from the considerably stronger 'And Your Bird Can Sing'". He added that it was "the one lesser moment on an otherwise massively rewarding [album]". Dan Caffrey of Consequence of Sound writes that, while it lacks the wholly universal scope of other songs by the band, "it's a nice little Lennon morality ditty on the perils of materialism with some innovative work with the clavioline from Lennon." Music critic Jim DeRogatis considers the track to be one of the Beatles' best psychedelic rock songs and an effective comment on Britain's first major countercultural happening. In 2010, "Baby, You're a Rich Man" was ranked at number 68 in Rolling Stone's list of the 100 greatest Beatles songs. The magazine's editors wrote: "Lennon's deeply stoned delivery and abstract questions about 'the beautiful people' captured the playfully spaced-out mood of the summer of 1967 – a spirit the Beatles were more tapped into than anyone."

== Remixes, further releases and cover versions ==
George Martin and recording engineer Geoff Emerick created the first true stereo mix of the song when preparing a 1971 German release of the Magical Mystery Tour album. Unable to recreate the spin-echo effect that had been introduced at the mixing stage of the original recording, they simply omitted it. The mix was completed on 22 October 1971. It was first made available in Britain in December 1981, when "Baby, You're a Rich Man" was included on a bonus EP containing previously unissued stereo mixes in the box set The Beatles EP Collection.

"Baby, You're a Rich Man" was mixed in stereo for a second time for the 1999 DVD release of the Yellow Submarine film and the accompanying Yellow Submarine Songtrack album. Portions of Lennon's clavioline part appear in the Love version of "Lucy in the Sky with Diamonds", released in 2006. Elements of "Baby, You're a Rich Man" also appear in the remix of "All You Need Is Love", which closes the Love album. In 2009, remastered stereo and mono Magical Mystery Tour CDs were released.

The Beatles' recording plays at the end of The Social Network, a 2010 film directed by David Fincher about the rise of Facebook and its co-founder and CEO Mark Zuckerberg (played by Jesse Eisenberg). Noel Murray and Matt Singer of The Dissolve include this appearance among the five most effective uses of a Beatles song in a feature film, describing it as the "perfect musical summation for The Social Network". According to Inkoo Kang of Slate magazine, the Beatles "sing-taunt" Zuckerberg with the song's chorus; in Murray and Singer's description, "Baby, You're a Rich Man" appears to "ask Zuckerberg all of our questions about what he's done", after he has developed Facebook into a billion-dollar company and, in the final scene, "sits triumphant – and totally alone".

American rappers the Fat Boys covered "Baby, You're a Rich Man" and performed it in the 1987 comedy film Disorderlies. Hip-hop duo P.M. Dawn incorporated the "How does it feel to be one of the beautiful people?" line into their song "The Beautiful", from the 1991 album Of the Heart, of the Soul and of the Cross: The Utopian Experience. They also replicated part of the music from "Baby, You're a Rich Man" in their track, having been denied permission to sample the Beatles' version. The song has also been covered by Kula Shaker, the Presidents of the United States of America and Umphrey's McGee.

== Personnel ==
According to Mark Lewisohn and Ian MacDonald:

The Beatles

- John Lennon – double-tracked lead vocal, piano, clavioline
- Paul McCartney – backing vocals, bass, piano
- George Harrison – backing vocals, rhythm guitar, lead guitar, handclaps
- Ringo Starr – drums, tambourine, maracas, handclaps

Additional musicians

- Eddie Kramer – vibraphone
- Mick Jagger – backing vocals (Note: Jagger's name appears on a session tape box, possibly indicating that he provided backing vocals near the end of the song.)

== Charts ==
Chart (1967)	Peak position
Australian Go-Set National Top 40	1
Belgium (Ultratop 50 Wallonia)	1
US Billboard Hot 100	34
US Cash Box Top 100	60

== Sources ==
- Babiuk, Andy (2002). Beatles Gear: All the Fab Four's Instruments, from Stage to Studio. San Francisco, CA: Backbeat Books. ISBN 978-0-87930-731-8.
- The Beatles (2000). The Beatles Anthology. San Francisco, CA: Chronicle Books. ISBN 978-0-8118-2684-6.
- Bellman, Jonathan (1998). The Exotic in Western Music. Lebanon, New Hampshire: UPNE. ISBN 1-55553-319-1.
- Borack, John M. (2007). Shake Some Action: The Ultimate Power Pop Guide. Fort Collins, CO: Not Lame Recordings. ISBN 978-0-9797714-0-8.
- Castleman, Harry; Podrazik, Walter J. (1976). All Together Now: The First Complete Beatles Discography 1961–1975. New York, NY: Ballantine Books. ISBN 0-345-25680-8.
- DeRogatis, Jim (2003). Turn on Your Mind: Four Decades of Great Psychedelic Rock. Milwaukee, WI: Hal Leonard. ISBN 978-0-634-05548-5.
- Doggett, Peter (2007). There's a Riot Going On: Revolutionaries, Rock Stars, and the Rise and Fall of '60s Counter-Culture. Edinburgh, UK: Canongate Books. ISBN 978-1-84195-940-5.
- Dowlding, William J. (1989). Beatlesongs. New York, NY: Simon & Schuster.
- Echard, William (2017). Psychedelic Popular Music: A History Through Musical Topic Theory. Bloomington, IN: Indiana University Press. ISBN 978-0-253-02659-0.
- Everett, Walter (1999). The Beatles as Musicians: Revolver Through the Anthology. New York, NY: Oxford University Press. ISBN 0-19-512941-5.
- Everett, Walter (2009). The Foundations of Rock: From "Blue Suede Shoes" to "Suite: Judy Blue Eyes"'. New York, NY: Oxford University Press. ISBN 978-0-19-531024-5.
- Guesdon, Jean-Michel; Margotin, Philippe (2013). All the Songs: The Story Behind Every Beatles Release. New York, NY: Black Dog & Leventhal. ISBN 978-1-57912-952-1.
- Henke, James (2003). Lennon Legend: An Illustrated Life of John Lennon. San Francisco, CA: Chronicle Books. ISBN 978-0-8118-3517-6.
- Lavezzoli, Peter (2006). The Dawn of Indian Music in the West. New York, NY: Continuum. ISBN 0-8264-2819-3.
- Leng, Simon (2006). While My Guitar Gently Weeps: The Music of George Harrison. Milwaukee, WI: Hal Leonard. ISBN 978-1-4234-0609-9.
- Lewisohn, Mark (2005) [1988]. The Complete Beatles Recording Sessions: The Official Story of the Abbey Road Years 1962–1970. London: Bounty Books. ISBN 978-0-7537-2545-0.
- MacDonald, Ian (2005). Revolution in the Head: The Beatles' Records and the Sixties (2nd rev. edn). Chicago, IL: Chicago Review Press. ISBN 978-1-55652-733-3.
- Miles, Barry (1997). Paul McCartney: Many Years from Now. New York, NY: Henry Holt and Company. ISBN 0-8050-5249-6.
- Miles, Barry (2001). The Beatles Diary Volume 1: The Beatles Years. London: Omnibus Press. ISBN 0-7119-8308-9.
- Mojo Special Limited Edition: 1000 Days That Shook the World (The Psychedelic Beatles – 1 April 1965 to 26 December 1967). London: Emap. 2002.
- Norman, Philip (1996) [1981]. Shout!: The Beatles in Their Generation. New York, NY: Fireside. ISBN 0-684-83067-1.
- Norman, Philip (2001). The Stones. London: Sidgwick & Jackson. ISBN 0-283-07277-6.
- Pedler, Dominic (2003). The Songwriting Secrets of the Beatles. London: Omnibus Press. ISBN 978-0-7119-8167-6.
- Poirier, Richard (1992) [1967]. "Learning from the Beatles". The Performing Self: Compositions and Decompositions in the Languages of Contemporary Life. New Brunswick, NJ: Rutgers University Press. ISBN 0-8135-1795-8.
- Reising, Russell; LeBlanc, Jim (2009). "Magical Mystery Tours, and Other Trips: Yellow submarines, newspaper taxis, and the Beatles' psychedelic years". In Womack, Kenneth (ed.). The Cambridge Companion to the Beatles. Cambridge, UK: Cambridge University Press. ISBN 978-0-521-68976-2.
- Riley, Tim (2002) [1988]. Tell Me Why – The Beatles: Album by Album, Song by Song, the Sixties and After. Cambridge, MA: Da Capo Press. ISBN 978-0-306-81120-3.
- Russell, Jeff (1982). The Beatles Album File and Complete Discography. London: Blandford Press. ISBN 0-7137-2065-4.
- Schaffner, Nicholas (1978). The Beatles Forever. New York, NY: McGraw-Hill. ISBN 0-07-055087-5.
- Selvin, Joel (2014). The Haight: Love, Rock, and Revolution. San Rafael, CA: Insight Editions. ISBN 978-1-60887-363-0.
- Sheff, David (2000) [1981]. All We Are Saying: The Last Major Interview with John Lennon and Yoko Ono. New York, NY: St. Martin's Friffin. ISBN 0-312-25464-4.
- Simonelli, David (2013). Working Class Heroes: Rock Music and British Society in the 1960s and 1970s. Lanham, MD: Lexington Books. ISBN 978-0-7391-7051-9.
- Tillery, Gary (2009). The Cynical Idealist: A Spiritual Biography of John Lennon. Wheaton, IL: Quest Books. ISBN 978-0-8356-0875-6.
- Turner, Steve (1999). A Hard Day's Write: The Stories Behind Every Beatles Song (2nd edn). New York, NY: Carlton/HarperCollins. ISBN 0-06-273698-1.
- Unterberger, Richie (2006). The Unreleased Beatles: Music & Film. San Francisco, CA: Backbeat Books. ISBN 978-0-87930-892-6.
- Winn, John C. (2009). That Magic Feeling: The Beatles' Recorded Legacy, Volume Two, 1966–1970. New York, NY: Three Rivers Press. ISBN 978-0-307-45239-9.
- Womack, Kenneth (2007). Long and Winding Roads: The Evolving Artistry of the Beatles. New York, NY: Continuum. ISBN 978-0-8264-1746-6.
- Womack, Kenneth (2014). The Beatles Encyclopedia: Everything Fab Four. Santa Barbara, CA: ABC-CLIO. ISBN 978-0-313-39171-2.
