= Simon Austin =

Australian guitarist, songwriter, producer and sound engineer

- Born: Simon Sean Nicholas David Austin; 9 October 1966 (age 59); Melbourne, Victoria, Australia
- Occupations: Singer; songwriter; guitarist; producer

Simon Sean Nicholas David Austin (born 9 October 1966) is an Australian guitarist, songwriter, producer and sound engineer. Austin was a founding member of Frente! in Melbourne in 1989 with Angie Hart on vocals, Tim O'Connor on bass guitar and Mark Picton on drums. Their top five hits on the Australian Recording Industry Association (ARIA) Singles Chart were "Ordinary Angels" (co-written by Austin and Hart) and "Accidently [sic] Kelly Street" (both in 1992). Their debut album, Marvin the Album, reached top five on the ARIA Albums Chart in the same year. After Frente! disbanded in 1996, Austin moved into record production and sound engineering.

== Biography ==
Simon is the grandson of Jack Austin (1910–1983), an Australian rules footballer.
