= Ian Cooper (violinist) =

Australian violinist

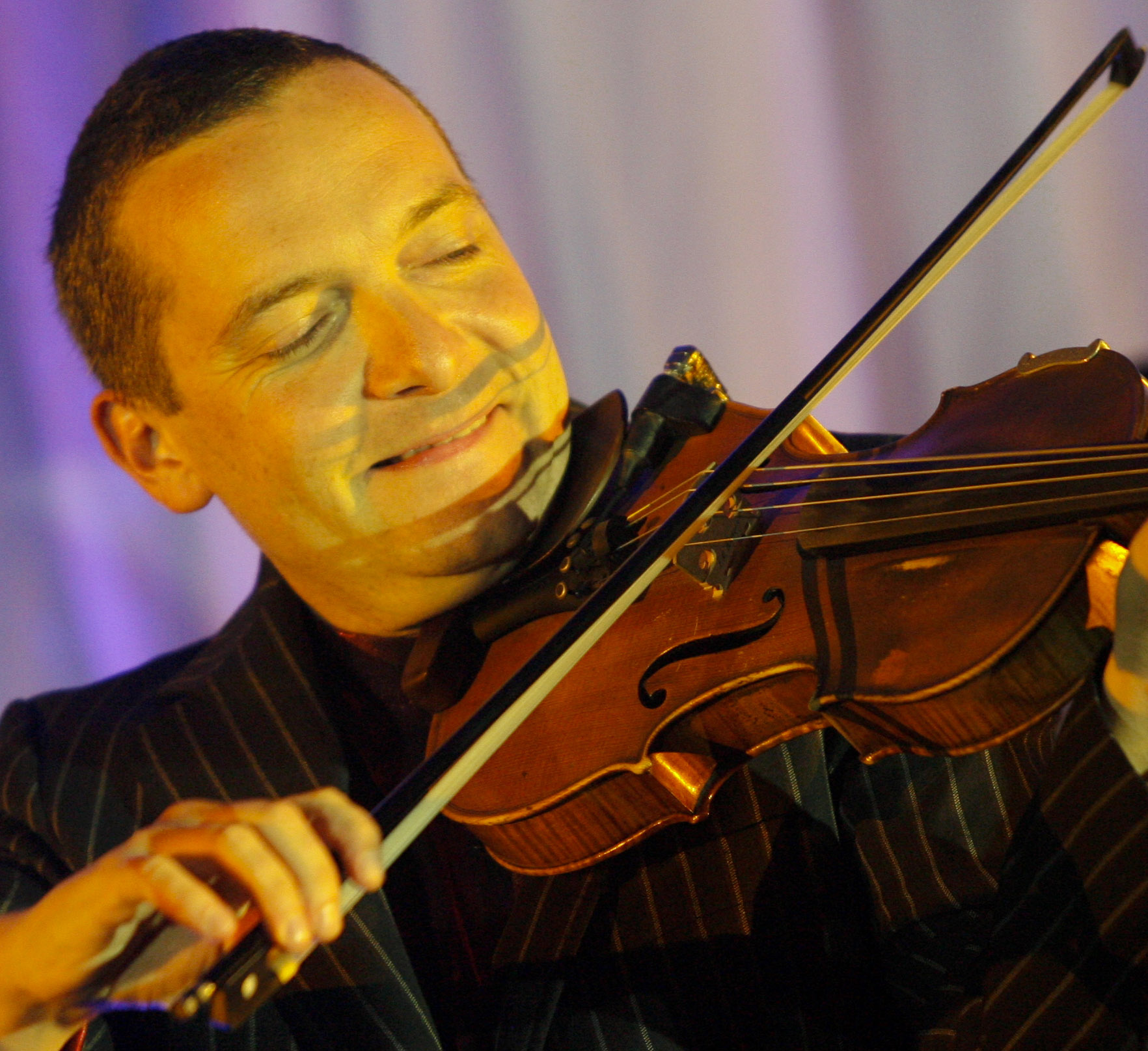

Background information
- Born: Ian Cooper; 4 August 1971 (age 55)
- Origin: Mona Vale, Sydney, Australia
- Genres: Jazz rock; Gypsy punk; Classical rock; Irish rock; Country rock
- Occupation: Musician
- Instruments: Violin, viola, electric cello
- Years active: 1986 – present
- Website: iancooper.com

Ian Cooper (born 4 August 1971) is an Australian violinist. He was commissioned to compose and perform the "Tin Symphony" for the opening ceremony of the Games of the XXVII Olympiad in Sydney. The event was televised worldwide with an estimated 2.85 billion viewers. He performs many musical styles including classical, gypsy, jazz, Irish and country music and has appeared with Tommy Emmanuel, James Morrison, Olivia Newton-John, Barry White, Simon Tedeschi, Deni Hines, and Silverchair.

== Background ==
Cooper began learning the violin at age 4 from his mother Jan Cooper, a Suzuki method violin teacher. He performed the Seitz Violin Concerto No. 2 Allegro Moderato at age 6 on the Seven Network's 11AM program with Roger Climpson. At age 7, Cooper performed concerts in the US and Canada, representing Australia at the Suzuki Violin World Conference. At age 8, he was awarded a scholarship to the New South Wales Conservatorium of Music in Sydney where he studied with Christopher Kimber, Harry Curby and Laszlo Kiss. He was subsequently awarded a music scholarship to Knox Grammar School where he also studied drums and percussion. At age 10, a performance in Japan was broadcast on NHK Television.

In 1990, Cooper was mentored by the French jazz violinist Stéphane Grappelli. After performing with the guitarist Tommy Emmanuel at his invitation at the Sydney Opera House in 1992, Cooper joined Emmanuel on tour until 1997. Cooper has also been a member of trumpeter James Morrison's sextet since 2007.

== Instruments ==
Cooper's main performing violin was made by E.H. Roth in Markneukirchen, Germany in 1926 and is modelled on an Antonio Stradivari 1714 Cremona instrument. His preferred violin for recording was made by Glanville & Co. in Sydney and is based on a Guarneri violin. His electric violins are Epoch, David Guscott and E.F. Keebler.

== Discography ==
- 1993 – Soundpost – with Ike Isaacs, Peter Inglis & Tim Rollinson
- 1994 – Strings of Swing – with Don Burrows, Tom Baker & Ian Date
- 1994 – Royal Flush – with Bernard Berkhout and Ian Date
- 1994 – Marcia Hines - Right Here and Now
- 1994 – Max Sharam - Coma
- 1994 – Chocolate Starfish - Box
- 1995 – Ian's World – with Tom Baker, Ian Date, Bernard Berkhout & John Morrison
- 1995 – The Backsliders - Wide Open
- 1995 – Tim Rogers & You Am I - Jewels & Bullets CD Single
- 1995 – 25th Breda Jazz Festival Official CD with Fapy Lafertin & Ian Date
- 1995 – Max Sharam - A Million Year Girl
- 1996 – Annie Crummer - Seventh Wave
- 1996 – Silverchair - Freak Show
- 1996 – At Home – with David Paquette
- 1997 – Hard Axe to Follow – with Tommy Emmanuel, Tommy Tycho, George Golla & Ian Date
- 1997 – The Nissan Cedrics - Going for a Song
- 1997 – The Earthmen - Love Walked In
- 1997 – John Morrison - Swingin' Upstairs
- 1999 – The Backsliders - Poverty Deluxe
- 2000 – The Games of the XXVII Olympiad 2000: Music from the Opening Ceremony CD & DVD
- 2002 – Big Band – with James Morrison
- 2002 – Geoff Achison - Chasing My Tail
- 2005 – John Farnham - I Remember When I Was Young: Songs from the Great Australian Songbook
- 2007 – Simon Tedeschi & Ian Cooper – with Simon Tedeschi
- 2007 – Deni Hines & James Morrison - The Other Woman
- 2008 – Melinda Schneider - Be Yourself
- 2008 – Olivia Newton-John - A Celebration in Song
- 2008 – Deni Hines & James Morrison - The Other Woman – Live DVD
- 2008 – Melinda Schneider - Hits & Rarities
- 2009 – The Smokin' Crawdads - Straight to the Pool Room
- 2009 – Ballads and Bossa Nova with James Morrison, Emma Pask, Jim Pennell, Steve Brien, Paul Cutlan & Phil Stack
- 2009 – Quintet with Simon Tedeschi & James Morrison
- 2010 – The Idea of North & James Morrison - Feels Like Spring
- 2010 – Hoodoo Gurus - Purity of Essence
- 2011 – Melinda Schneider - Life Begins at 40
- 2012 – The Idea of North - This Christmas
- 2013 – Nathan Leigh Jones - I'll Be Home for Christmas
- 2014 – Richard Ingham - A Return to Home
- 2015 – Just Passing Through – with Tommy Emmanuel and Ian Date
- 2015 – Emma Pask - Cosita Divina
- 2015 – Mayhem 101 - Six Stars & the Union Jack
- 2015 – Richard Ingham - Almost Wordless
- 2016 – Melinda Schneider - Melinda Does Doris Again
- 2020 – Qantas Airways - Qantas In-Flight Safety Video
- 2020 – Husky - Go Don't Stop
- 2022 – Cats in Space - Kickstart the Sun

== Awards and recognition ==
=== Ace Awards ===
Year	Nominee / work	Award	Result (wins only)
1999	Ian Cooper	Instrumental Act of the Year	Won
2000	Ian Cooper	Instrumental Act of the Year	Won
2016	Ian Cooper	Instrumental Act of the Year	Won

=== Golden Fiddle Awards ===
Year	Nominee / work	Award	Result (wins only)
2005	Ian Cooper	Best CD by a fiddler as soloist	Won
2006	Ian Cooper	Best fiddler soloist	Won
2006	Ian Cooper - Big Band	Best CD by a fiddler as soloist	Won
2014	Ian Cooper	Best fiddler as a soloist	Won
2014	Ian Cooper's International Spectacular	Best Band	Won

=== Mo Awards ===
The Australian Entertainment Mo Awards (commonly known informally as the Mo Awards), were annual Australian entertainment industry awards. They recognise achievements in live entertainment in Australia from 1975 to 2016. Ian Cooper won two awards in that time

Year	Nominee / work	Award	Result (wins only)
1998	Ian Cooper	Instrumental Performer of the Year	Won
1999	Ian Cooper	Instrumental Performer of the Year	Won

== See also ==
- List of jazz violinists
