= Berkhout (surname) =

Berkhout is a Dutch surname. Notable people with the surname include:

- Bernard Berkhout (born 1961), Dutch physician and jazz clarinetist
- Christine Marie Berkhout (1893–1932), Dutch mycologist
- Guus Berkhout (born 1940), Dutch engineer
- Jorn Berkhout (born 2002), Dutch football player
- Lobke Berkhout (born 1980), Dutch sailor
- Nina Berkhout (born 1975), Canadian novelist and poet
