= Ian Date =

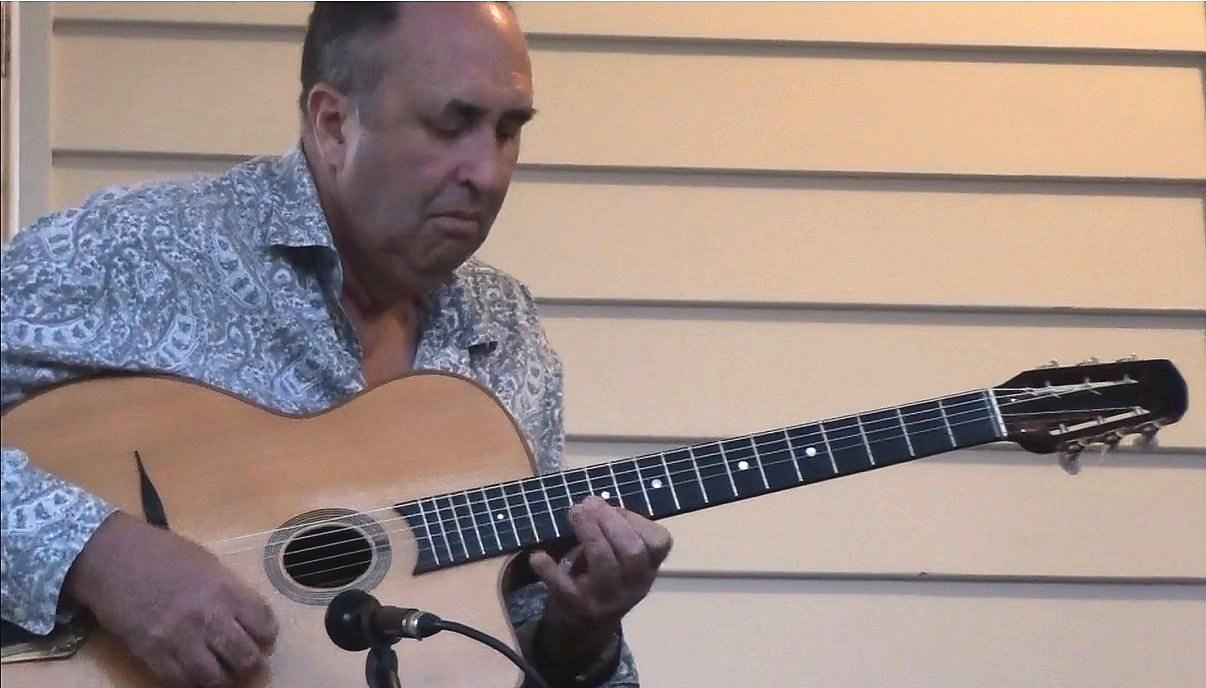

Background information
- Born: 1960 (age 65–66); Australia
- Genres: Gypsy jazz, swing
- Occupation: Musician
- Instruments: Guitar, banjo, trumpet
- Years active: 1976–present
- Website: datebrothers.com

Ian Date (born c. 1960) is an Australian acoustic and electric guitarist most associated with the Gypsy jazz and bebop genres. He achieved success in the 1980s in the band Sweet Atmosphere co-led with Australian violinist George Washingmachine, playing repertoire of the 1930s and 1940s. He also plays banjo, trumpet. Jazz Ramble states, "(Ian) has played all over the world, has made numerous television, radio, festival and concert performances, and is regarded as one of Australia's great guitar players."

== Biography ==
Ian Date grew up in Byron Bay, a coastal town in northern New South Wales, Australia, later moving to Macksville, a small town halfway between Sydney and Brisbane. His mother was a classically trained pianist and his first instrument was the ukulele and later the guitar. He played with high school bands at age 14 and at age 16, left school to play music professionally and never went back. He became a part of the Sydney jazz scene from the 1970s to the early 2000s where he played in numerous jazz ensembles including the Conway Brothers' "Hiccups" Orchestra with Jim and Mic Conway, also including his future collaborator the violinist George Washingmachine; in a long lasting band with George Washingmachine called "Sweet Atmosphere"; plus collaborations with Tom Baker (trumpet), and Ian Cooper (violin) among others. He has appeared on many recordings with other artists including George Golla, Tommy Emmanuel and the harmonica player Brendan Power, and (with his brother Nigel Date) performs as "The Date Brothers" when he is in Australia.

Since 2002 he has been resident in County Cork, Ireland where he lives with his wife Ilse de Ziah, a solo cellist, and their two children, and tours within Ireland, Europe and further afield including at least one return visit to Australia each year. Ian's acoustic guitar (and occasional banjo) repertoire is based firmly on music of the jazz era from the 1920s onwards, with a particular affinity for the virtuoso gypsy jazz style, with excursions to 1950s material and later, and also to elements of classical guitar and world music genres; when playing electric jazz guitar he favours a bebop style owing its origins to the playing of Charlie Christian, Barney Kessel and their successors. In concert, Ian also features his own vocals and trumpet playing, the latter developed mostly over the last 10 years or so.

== Instruments ==
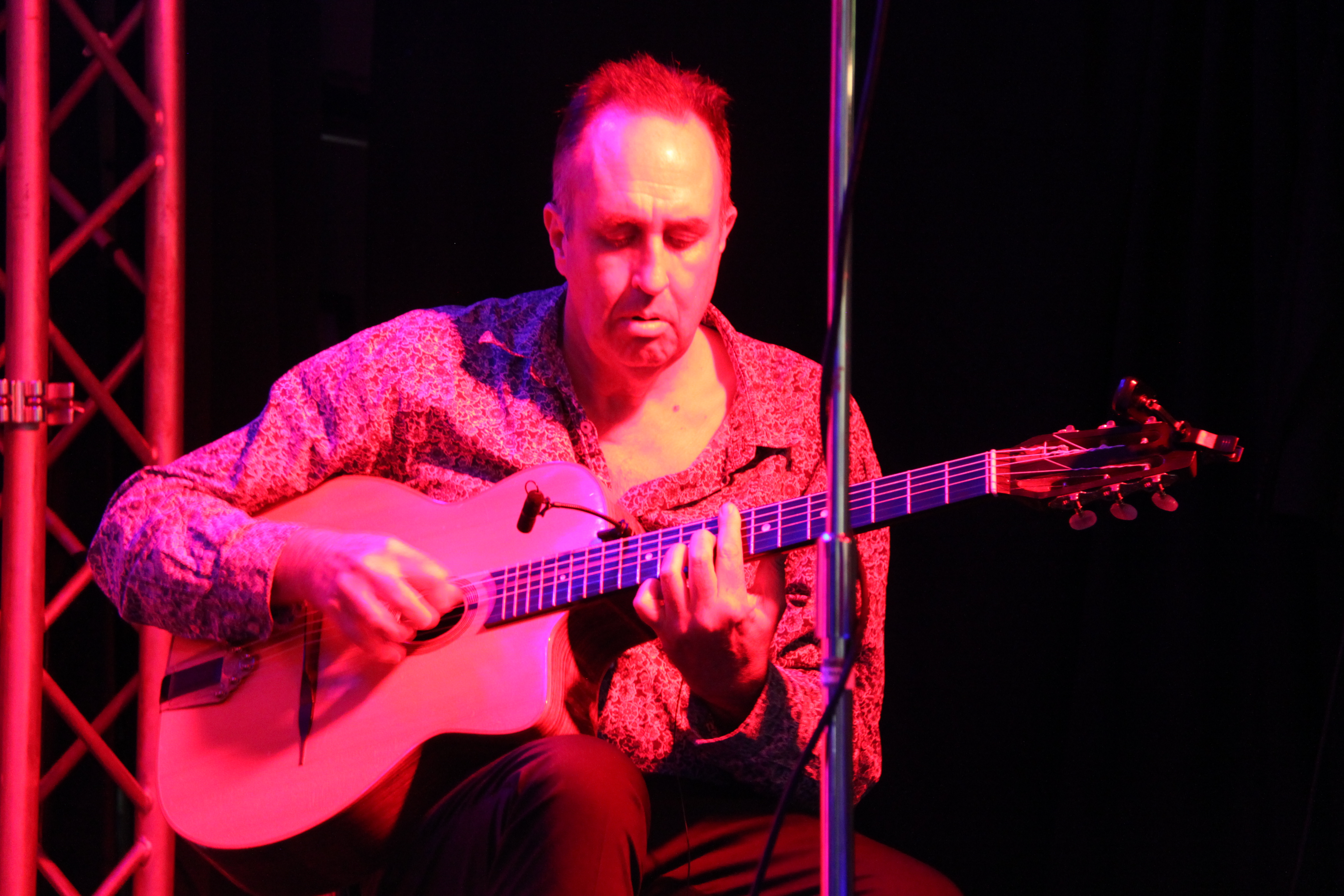
Ian Date performing at the Lismore Jazz Club, Australia, November 2017

Ian's main acoustic jazz guitar is an original oval-hole Selmer (Maccaferri style) instrument, no. 507, just 4 serial numbers away from Django Reinhardt's main guitar (no. 503) which is now in a museum in Paris. He also owns an earlier D-hole Selmer, no. 142, and in Australia has performed and recorded using one of the last Selmer guitars made, no. 861. When not playing his Selmer guitars he also uses an oval-hole Selmer replica constructed by luthier Piers Crocker in Sydney, New South Wales. For electric work he favours hollowbodies after the style of those manufactured by Gibson.

== Discography ==
=== As leader ===
- Sweet Atmosphere (Jarra Hill, 2001)
- The String Band (New Market Music, 2001)
- Just Passing Through with Ian Cooper, Tommy Emmanuel (CGP Sounds, 2015)

=== As sideman ===
- Dan Barrett, In Australia (Arbors, 1997)
- Bernard Berkhout, Royal Flush (Timeless, 1994)
- Ian Cooper, Strings of Swing (Larrikin, 1994)
- Janet Seidel, Winter Moon (La Brava Music, 1994)
- Martin Taylor, Two's Company (Linn, 1997)
