= Take Your Time =

Take Your Time may refer to:

- Take Your Time (Scatman John album), 1999
- Take Your Time (Kulcha album), 1997
- "Take Your Time", a 1958 Buddy Holly song, the B-side of "Rave On"
- "Take Your Time" (Lynyrd Skynyrd song), 1974
- "Take Your Time (Do It Right)", a 1980 song by The S.O.S. Band
- "Take Your Time (Pebbles song)", a 1988 song by Pebbles
- "Take Your Time", a 1990 song by Mantronix featuring Wondress from the album This Should Move Ya
- "Take Your Time" (Sam Hunt song), 2014
