= Flow, River of My Soul =

Studio album by Single Gun Theory
- Released: September 1994
- Genre: Electronic, ambient pop, downtempo
- Label: Volition/Sony; Nettwerk
- Producer: Single Gun Theory

Single Gun Theory chronology
Like Stars in My Hands (1991)	Flow, River of My Soul (1994)	The Monkey's Mask: Music from the Motion Picture (2001)

Singles from Album
- 1. "Fall" Released: 1994; 2. "Motherland" Released: 1995; 3. "Metaphysical" Released: 1995

Flow, River of My Soul is the third studio album by Australian electronic dance-pop band Single Gun Theory. It was released in September 1994 via Volition Records/Sony Music Australia and peaked at No. 46 on the ARIA Albums Chart in the following month. The album's lead single, "Fall", was issued in October and was followed by two more, "Open the Skies" (March 1995) and "Motherland" (August).

At the 1995 ARIA Music Awards, the album was nominated for Best Dance Release and Best Independent Release.

== Track listing ==
1. "Transmission" – 1:02
2. "Fall" – 4:26
3. "The Sea of Core Experience" – 4:36
4. "I've Been Dying" – 3:39
5. "Decimated" – 2:02
6. "My Estranged Wife" – 4:24
7. "Phenomena" – 1:36
8. "Metaphysical" – 3:41
9. "Point Beyond Which Something Will Happen" – 3:48
10. "Thetan" – 2:54
11. "Motherland" – 5:33
12. "Still Closest to My Heart..." – 1:41
13. "Motherland [Remix Edit]"^
14. "Motherland [A Cappella Remix Edit]"^
15. "Motherland [Album Version Edit]"^
16. "Fall [Abstract Gladiators Remix]"^
17. "Fall [Voyage to the Bottom of the Dub Remix]"^

^ These bonus tracks appear on the re-release version of the album in 2001. They were lifted from the Motherland extended play, which was released in August 1995.

== Personnel ==
- Jacqui Hunt – vocals
- Pete Rivett-Carnac – samplers
- Kath Power – samplers

== Charts ==
Chart (1994–95)	Peak position
Australian Albums (ARIA)	46
