= Kulcha (album) =

Studio album by Kulcha
- Released: 5 September 1994
- Label: EastWest
- Producer: Matthew O'Connor

Kulcha chronology
Kulcha (1994)	Take Your Time (1997)

Singles from Kulcha
- 1. "Shaka Jam" Released: 9 May 1994; 2. "Don't Be Shy" Released: 4 July 1994; 3. "Fly Girl" Released: 12 September 1994; 4. "Soul Feeling" Released: 16 January 1995

Kulcha is the debut studio album released by Australian R&B band Kulcha. The album spawned four top 30 singles and was certified gold in Australia. The album was released in September 1994.

At the ARIA Music Awards of 1995, the album was nominated for Best Pop Release; losing out to "Chains" by Tina Arena. Members of Kulcha : Erick Palu, Jay Whitmore, Joe Fidow and Richard Matilla.

== Track listing ==
1. "Kulcha Feel" - 1:33
2. "Don't Be Shy" - 4:10
3. "Shaka Jam" - 4:08
4. "Bring It On" - 3:26
5. "Fly Girl" - 4:18
6. "Soul Feeling" - 4:02
7. "Rush Me" - 5:19
8. "My Love" - 3:36
9. "Be My Lady" - 4:08
10. "Spend the Night" - 5:00
11. "So Special" - 4:31
12. "Nasty" - 4:20

== Charts ==
=== Weekly charts ===
Chart (1994/95)	Peak position
Australian Albums (ARIA)	7
New Zealand Albums (RMNZ)	5

== Certification ==
Region	Certification	Certified units/sales
Australia (ARIA)	Gold	35,000^{^}
^{^} Shipments figures based on certification alone.

== Release history ==
Region	Date	Label	Format(s)	Catalogue	Ref.
Australia	5 September 1994	EastWest	CD; cassette	4509976772; 4509976774	
