= Soul Feeling =

1995 single by Kulcha

Single by Kulcha

from the album Kulcha
- Released: 16 January 1995
- Length: 4:03
- Label: EastWest
- Songwriters: Matthew O'Connor; Jay Whitmore
- Producer: Matthew O'Connor

Kulcha singles chronology
"Fly Girl" (1994)	"Soul Feeling" (1995)	"Everytime You Go Away" (1995)

"Soul Feeling" is a song by Australian R&B group Kulcha. It was released in January 1995 as the fourth and final single from the band's debut studio album, Kulcha. The song peaked at number 16 in Australia and number 18 in New Zealand.

== Track listing ==
CD single

1. "Soul Feeling" (radio edit) – 4:03
2. "Soul Feeling" (remix) – 4:09
3. "Soul Feeling" (instrumental) – 4:09

== Charts ==
Chart (1995)	Peak position
Australia (ARIA)	16
New Zealand (Recorded Music NZ)	18
