= 1995 ARIA Music Awards =

Annual Australian music awards

- Date: 20 October 1995
- Venue: Sydney Convention & Exhibition Centre, Sydney, New South Wales

Highlights
- Most wins: Silverchair (5)
- Most nominations: Silverchair (9)
- Website: ariaawards.com.au

Television/radio coverage
- Network: Network Ten

The Ninth Australian Recording Industry Association Music Awards (generally known as the ARIA Music Awards or simply the ARIAs) was held on 20 October 1995 at the Sydney Convention & Exhibition Centre. There had been a 18-month gap since the previous award ceremony which was moved to be "closer to the business end of the music industry's year" and so reflect that year's works. Presenters distributed 28 awards from 1060 eligible submissions. Big winners for the year were Silverchair with five awards and Tina Arena with four, including Album of the Year and Song of the Year – both first time they were won by a female.

In addition to previous categories, the former category Best Pop/Dance Release was split into Best Pop Release and Best Dance Release. Another new category Best World Music Album was also presented for the first time. The ARIA Hall of Fame inducted: The Seekers.

== Ceremony details ==
=== Presenters and performers ===
The ARIA Awards ceremony was hosted by radio and TV personality Richard Stubbs. Presenters and performers were:

==== Presenters ====
- Peter Asher
- Billy Birmingham
- Kimberley Davies
- Suze DeMarchi
- Diesel
- Melissa Etheridge
- Dave Graney
- Janet Jackson
- Gina Jeffreys
- Montell Jordan
- Alison Drower
- Ian Rogerson
- The Hon. Michael Lee
- Molly Meldrum
- Richard Wilkins
- Rick Price
- Max Sharam
- Vanessa-Mae
- Greedy Smith
- Michael Spiby
- Mandawuy Yunupingu
- Adam Thompson
- Monica Trapaga
- Meat Loaf

==== Performers ====
- Tina Arena - "Heaven Help My Heart"
- Merril Bainbridge - "Power of One"
- Melissa Etheridge with INXS and Southern Sons - "Your Little Secret"
- Deni Hines - "It's Alright"
- Renegade Funktrain - "I Wonder"
- Swoop - "Apple Eyes"
- Screaming Jets - "Sad Song"
- Silverchair, Tim Rogers – "New Race"
- Take That - "Back for Good"
- TISM - "Greg! The Stop Sign!!"

=== Dubious acceptance speech ===
Itch-E and Scratch-E won the inaugural award for Best Dance Release. One of the duo, Paul Mac's acceptance speech included:

We'd like to thank all of Sydney's ecstasy dealers, without whom this award would not be possible.

— Paul Mac, 20 October 1995

One of the sponsors of the ceremony was the National Drug Offensive, which withdrew their financial backing. The jargon term, ecstasy, for a psychoactive drug was bleeped for the TV broadcast. In 2005 Mac explained that he did not expect to win and so had no speech prepared.

== Awards ==
Final nominees are shown, in plain, with winners in bold.

=== ARIA Awards ===
- Album of the Year
  - **Tina Arena – Don't Ask**
    - Christine Anu – Stylin' Up
    - The Cruel Sea – Three Legged Dog
    - Silverchair – Frogstomp
    - You Am I – Hi Fi Way
- Single of the Year
  - **Silverchair – "Tomorrow"**
    - Tina Arena – "Chains"
    - Merril Bainbridge – "Mouth"
    - Nick Cave and the Bad Seeds – "Do You Love Me?"
    - Max Sharam – "Coma"
- Highest Selling Album
  - **The 12th Man – Wired World of Sports II**
    - Tina Arena – Don't Ask
    - The Badloves – Get On Board
    - The Cruel Sea – Three Legged Dog
    - Wendy Matthews – The Witness Tree
- Highest Selling Single
  - **Silverchair – "Tomorrow"**
    - Merril Bainbridge – "Mouth"
    - Chocolate Starfish – "Mountain"
    - Kulcha – "Shaka Jam"
    - Kylie Minogue – "Confide in Me"
- Best Group
  - **The Cruel Sea – Three Legged Dog**
    - Nick Cave and the Bad Seeds – Let Love In
    - Crowded House – "Private Universe"
    - Silverchair – Frogstomp
    - You Am I – Hi Fi Way
- Best Female Artist
  - **Tina Arena – Don't Ask**
    - Christine Anu – Stylin' Up
    - Merril Bainbridge – "Mouth"
    - Kylie Minogue – Kylie Minogue
    - Max Sharam – A Million Year Girl
- Best Male Artist
  - **Diesel – Solid State Rhyme**
    - Paul Kelly – Wanted Man
    - Ed Kuepper – Character Assassination
    - Rick Price – River of Love
    - Chris Wilson – Live at the Continental
- Best New Talent
  - **Silverchair – Frogstomp**
    - Merril Bainbridge – "Mouth"
    - Magic Dirt – Life Was Better
    - Max Sharam – A Million Year Girl
    - The Truth – "My Heavy Friend"
- Breakthrough Artist – Album
  - **Silverchair – Frogstomp**
    - Christine Anu – Stylin' Up
    - D.I.G. – Dig Deeper
    - Max Sharam – A Million Year Girl
    - Vika and Linda – Vika and Linda
- Breakthrough Artist – Single
  - **Silverchair – "Tomorrow"** (Note: ARIA website includes Silverchair's Frogstomp as a final nominee in the 'Breakthrough Artist – Single' category. Frogstomp won the related 'Breakthrough Artist – Album' category. Silverchair have no single/track named "Frogstomp". ARIA's original nomination list and 1995 Yearbook states "Tomorrow" is the nominee. Other nominees are as ARIA's original nomination list and 1995 Yearbook.)
    - Merril Bainbridge – "Mouth"
    - Directions In Groove – "The Favourite"
    - Max Sharam – "Coma"
    - Vika and Linda – "When Will You Fall for Me?"
- Best Dance Release
  - **Itch-E and Scratch-E – "Sweetness and Light"** (Note: ARIA introduces the 1995 Awards page with a summary section that includes "The Best Pop/Dance Release was this year split into two categories, won by Tina Arena and Itch-e & Scratch-e respectively." The main listing of the awards does not show any information on 'The Best Dance Release' category. However, the winners and nominees were published in ARIA's 1996 Yearbook.)
    - Boxcar – "What Are You So Happy About"
    - Quench – "Dreams"
    - Renegade Funktrain – "I Wonder"
    - The Rockmelons – "Stronger Together"
    - Single Gun Theory – Flow, River Of My Soul
- Best Pop Release
  - **Tina Arena – "Chains"**
    - Merril Bainbridge – "Mouth"
    - Kulcha – Kulcha
    - Mental As Anything – Mr Natural
    - Tlot Tlot – "The Girlfriend Song"
- Best Country Album
  - **Troy Cassar-Daley – Beyond the Dancing**
    - Slim Dusty – Natural High
    - Gina Jeffreys – The Flame
    - Lee Kernaghan – Country Crowd
    - Jane Saunders – Strangers to Your Heart
- Best Independent Release
  - **TISM – Machiavelli and the Four Seasons**
    - Def FX – Ritual Eternal
    - Ed Kuepper – Character Assassination
    - Magic Dirt – Life Was Better
    - Single Gun Theory – Flow, River of My Soul
- Best Alternative Release
  - **You Am I – Hi Fi Way**
    - Custard – Wahooti Fandango
    - Magic Dirt – Life Was Better
    - Regurgitator – Regurgitator
    - Silverchair – Frogstomp
- Best Indigenous Release
  - **Christine Anu – Stylin' Up**
    - Kev Carmody – "On the Wire"
    - Ruby Hunter – Thoughts Within
    - Tiddas – "Changing Times"
    - Yothu Yindi & Neil Finn – "Dots on the Shells"
- Best Adult Contemporary Album
  - **My Friend the Chocolate Cake – Brood** (Note: ARIA lists "I've Got a Plan" as the winner of 'Best Adult Contemporary Album' category. "I've Got a Plan" is an album track on Brood.)
    - The Black Sorrows – Lucky Charm
    - Phil Emmanuel & Tommy Emmanuel – Terra Firma
    - Dave Hole – Steel on Steel
    - Wendy Matthews – The Witness Tree
- Best Comedy Release
  - **The 12th Man – Wired World of Sports II**
    - Austen Tayshus – Alive and Schticking
    - Jimeoin – Crack
    - Kevin Bloody Wilson – Let Loose Live in London
    - Scared Weird Little Guys – Scared

=== Fine Arts Awards ===
- Best Jazz Album
  - **Bernie McGann Trio – McGann McGann**
  - **Mark Simmonds Freeboppers – Fire**
    - The Allan Browne Quartet – Birdcalls
    - Australian Art Orchestra – Ringing the Ball Backwards
    - Bobby Gebert Trio – Sculpture
- Best Classical Album
  - **Yvonne Kenny, Melbourne Symphony Orchestra, Vladimir Kamirski – Simple Gifts**
    - Adelaide Symphony Orchestra, David Porcelijn, János Fürst – Powerhouse Three Poems of Byron – Capriccio Nocturnes Unchained Melody
    - Duncan Gifford – Debussy Preludes Books I & II
    - Slava Grigoryan – Spirit of Spain
    - Graham Pushee, Australian Brandenburg Orchestra, Paul Dyer – Handel: Opera Arias
- Best Children's Album
  - **The Wiggles – Big Red Car**
    - Adelaide Symphony Orchestra – Dream Children
    - Cinderella Acappella – Cinderella Acappella
    - Franciscus Henri – I'm Hans Christian Andersen
    - Play School – Oomba Baroomba
- Best Original Soundtrack / Cast / Show Recording
  - **Cast Recording – The Pirates of Penzance**
    - Martin Armiger – Fornicon
    - Guy Gross – The Priscilla Companion Original Score
    - Various – Heartland
    - Various – Metal Skin
    - Various – Once in a Blue Moon
- Best World Music Album
  - **Yungchen Lhamo – Tibetan Prayer**
    - Bu Baca Diop – Stand
    - The Celts – The Rocky Road
    - Nomad - Nomad
    - Sirocco – The Wetland Suite
    - Various – Tribal Heart

=== Artisan Awards ===
- Song of the Year
  - **Tina Arena – "Chains" (Tina Arena)**
    - Merril Bainbridge – "Mouth" (Merril Bainbridge)
    - Daniel Johns/Ben Gillies – "Tomorrow" (Silverchair)
    - Neil Murray – "Island Home" (Christine Anu)
    - Max Sharam – "Coma" (Max Sharam)
- Producer of the Year
  - **Tony Cohen** for **The Cruel Sea – Three Legged Dog**
    - Daniel Denholm
    - David Bridie
    - Paul McKercher
    - Phil McKellar
- Engineer of the Year
  - **Tony Cohen**, **Paul McKercher** for **The Cruel Sea – Three Legged Dog**
    - Doug Brady
    - Cameron Craig
    - Mark Forrester
    - Craig Porteils
    - Doug Roberts
- Best Video
  - **Keir McFarlane – Kylie Minogue – "Put Yourself in My Place"**
    - Robbie Douglas-Turner – You Am I – "Jewels & Bullets"
    - Bob Ellis – Electric Hippies – "Greedy People"
    - Paul Elliott – Max Sharam – "Coma"
    - Tony Mahoney – Dave Graney & the Coral Snakes – "I'm Gonna Release Your Soul"
- Best Cover Art
  - **Dominic O'Brien – Max Sharam – A Million Year Girl**
    - Simon Anderson – Electric Hippies – The Electric Hippies
    - Simon Anderson – You Am I – Hi Fi Way
    - The Cruel Sea, Kristyna Higgins, Jim Paton – The Cruel Sea – Three Legged Dog
    - Reg Mombassa – Mental As Anything – Mr Natural

== ARIA Hall of Fame inductee ==
The Hall of Fame inductee was:

- The Seekers
