= Blindman's Holiday =

Blindman's Holiday was an Australian all-female a cappella ensemble based in Sydney, New South Wales. Formed in 1985, the group became known for close-harmony singing, vocal percussion, and a repertoire drawing on folk, contemporary, and traditional music from a wide range of international traditions.

The ensemble was regarded as the most prominent Australian professional vocal group associated with a cappella and world music and recognised on the international stage in the 1980s and 1990s.

== Band members ==
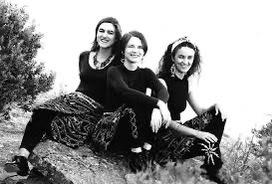
Blindman’s Holiday - early years. Karen Smith, Gemma Turner and Linda Marr - 1980’s

Original members included Linda Marr, Karen Smith, Gemma Turner, and Julie Vickers.

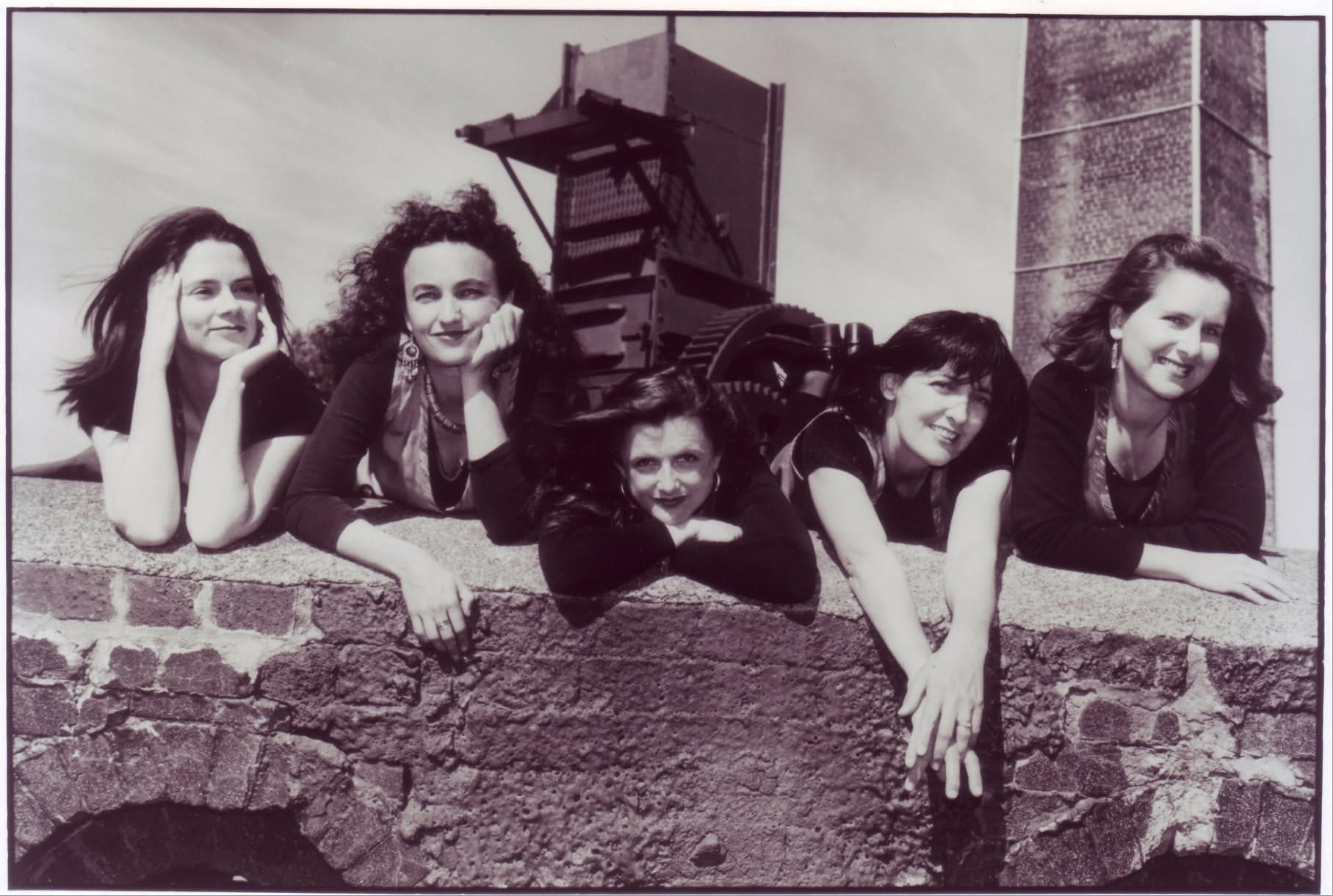
Blindman’s Holiday - Gemma Turner, Linda Marr, Clarita Derwent, Lee Hildyard, Maria De Marco - 1990’s

In 1993, the group's line-up expanded to include Clarita Derwent and Maria de Marco.

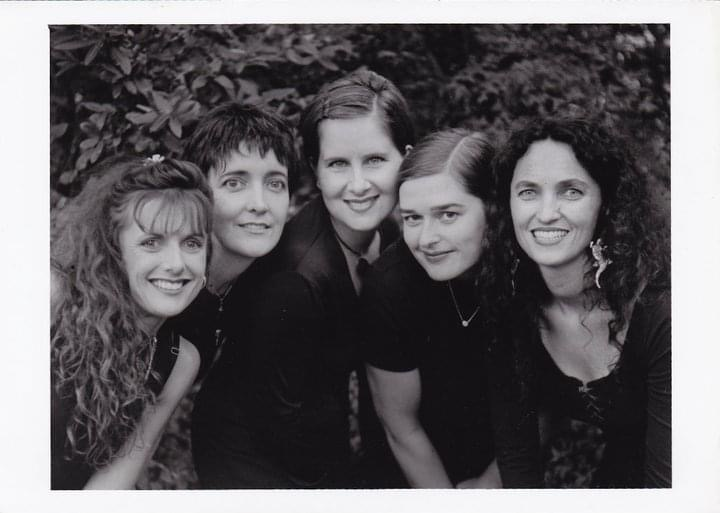
Blindman’s Holiday - Clarita Derwent, Lee Hildyard, Maria De Marco, Eleanor Tucker, Linda Marr - early 2000s

In later years, various members moved on to new projects and other vocalists joined the group: Lee Hildyard (of Xenos), Elizabeth Sison, Eleanor Tucker, Christina Mimmocchi, Helen Rivero, and Gisele Scales.

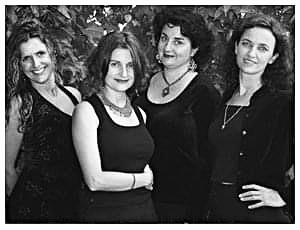
Blindman’s Holiday - Clarita Derwent, Helen Rivero, Christina Mimmocchi, Linda Marr - late 2000’s

== Collaboration and performance highlights ==
Blindman’s Holiday was formed in Sydney in 1985 and from the mid-1980s onward, Blindman's Holiday toured extensively throughout Australia and completed three major European tours. The ensemble performed in the UK and Europe at venues and festivals including the New Morning Jazz Club in Paris, WOMAD in the United Kingdom, and the Melkweg in Amsterdam. A quote from Time Out London said “Ace Australian all-female a cappella group who dazzle with their simple intensity and sensitivity...A must." Time Out (London) 1992.

In Australia, the band appeared at many prestigious venues such as the Sydney Opera House, the City Recital Hall at Angel Place, Melbourne Town Hall, Queensland Performing Arts Centre (QPAC), The Fremantle Arts Centre, Darwin Entertainment Centre, amongst many other venues.

In May 1987, Blindman's Holiday appeared in the performances of OWALA 5 at Sydney's The Edge Theatre in a collaborative program together with the Kinetic Energy Dance Company. This performance featured Tom Shapcott's "The Cycle", dance choreography by Graham Jones and Jepke Goudsmit, and the music and songs by Blindman's Holiday. This series concluded with a collaborative performance of "Mopping Up".

On 30 August 1992, the group were invited to perform for the official opening of the Sydney Harbour Tunnel. On this day, 136,000 pedestrians walked through the tunnel for a ticketed event to raise money for the Royal Institute for Deaf and Blind Children

In 1993, the group was selected to represent Australia as the official performers at the South Pacific Forum, a special gathering of Heads of State. This was held on the island of Nauru in 1993.

In 1994 and 1995, the group performed at the Huntington Estate Music Festival in Mudgee, New South Wales. This appearance was described by some reviewers as a successful crossover between a vocal world-music ensemble and chamber and classical music, due to the theme of this particular festival nd the general attendees at the festival being classical music enthusiasts.

In September 1997, Blindman's Holiday collaborated with The Seymour Group and B'Tutta and conductor Mark Summerbell in performances of Steve Reich's Tehillim. This is a composition for voices and percussion written by Reich in 1981, and is based on Hebrew psalm texts. Commentators noted the suitability of the collaboration, given the vocal ensemble's experience with complex rhythmic structures, close vocal harmonies and singing in languages other than English. The performance was broadcast live on the National Broadcaster ABC Radio Classic FM, from the Turbine Hall of the Powerhouse Museum, “to premiere works by Reich, Bright and Sarcich never before heard in Sydney.” Jeremy Eccles.

On 26 May 1998, Blindman's Holiday performed at the inaugural National Sorry Day Concert on the Sydney Opera House Forecourt. The event marked the first National Sorry Day, one year after the tabling of the Bringing Them Home report on the Stolen Generations. The concert also featured exceptional Australian indigenous performers, including Archie Roach, Ruby Hunter, and Kev Carmody. The concert finale was highlighted by all performers singing together on Kev Carmody’s song "From Little Things Big Things Grow" (co-written with Paul Kelly).

On 30 October 1999, the ensemble was invited to perform for the opening of the new major classical music concert venue in Sydney, City Recital Hall at Angel Place.

In 2002, the group was commissioned to perform a series of concerts as part of the Historic Houses of NSW through the National Trust of Australia, including a specially curated concert dedicated to lullabies from around the world at Elizabeth Bay House, Government House Sydney, and Vaucluse House. This included historic costumes and special choreography.

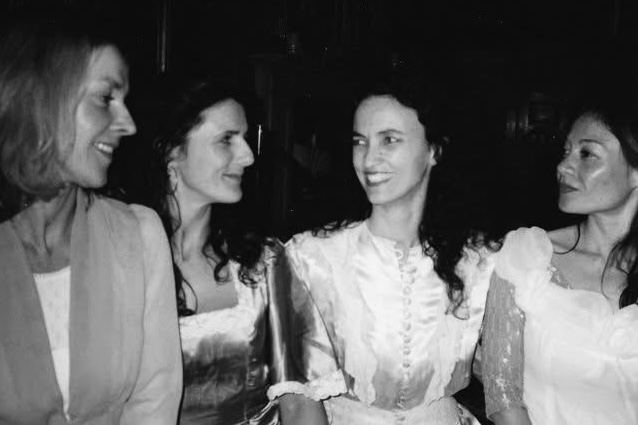
Blindman’s holiday - Historic Houses of NSW lullaby concert series 2002, dressed in historic costumes

In 2005, Blindman's Holiday also undertook a tour to Singapore, with support from the Australia Council for the Arts and Musica Viva. The Singapore tour formed part of the group’s broader international profile during these years.

In 2006, Blindman's Holiday was invited by the Brunei Musical Society in collaboration with Musica Viva Australia and the Australian High Commission, to perform in Brunei Darussalam.

== Radio and television ==
Blindman's Holiday had many television appearances over the working years of the band on the free to air stations Channel 9, Network 10, SBS, ABC TV, Romperemos TV. They appeared on stage at The Domain as part of the annual Carols by Candlelight in the Domain.

On radio the group regularly appeared on the Australian National broadcaster ABC, on the popular music station TripleJ Radio, on the World Beat program with Jaslyn Hall, Radio National Music Delhi program with Paul Petran, The Planet (founded by Robyn Johnston) hosted by Doug Spencer and Lucky Oceans, , RRR Sydney, ABC Classic, 3CR Melbourne, Folkwest RCRFM, PBS radio with Therese Virtue OAM, and Live at the Wireless.

Concerts were recorded live for the ABC on many occasions in the ABC Ultimo studios, and in the Eugene Goossens Hall. The band was also recorded by the ABC - live at Port Fairy Festival, live at the Powerhouse Museum (with Synergy), live at Huntington Festival, live at The Loaded Dog Folk Club, live at Woodford Folk Festival, live at the National Folk Festival.

In 1992 Blindman's Holiday's version of a popular folk tune from Chile South America, originally written by Los Jaivas "Todos Juntos", was played on high rotation on Triple J radio. As a result of this highly successful track it was later included on a Polygram/ABC Music release.

In 1999, like many other bands such as Coldplay and Sticky Fingers, Blindman's Holiday chose the suburb of Newtown and the Inner West of Sydney to film their music video "Langa Aaja". This was broadcast on TV program RAGE regularly during 1999.

On Christmas Day 2003, the quartet was invited to host and appear on the ABC television program Compass, titled The Gift of Song.

== Other performances and festivals ==
The ensemble also appeared regularly at major Australian venues festivals, including:

The inaugural Womadelaide, the Adelaide Festival, the Melbourne International Arts Festival, the Port Fairy Folk Festival, the National Folk Festival, and the Woodford Folk Festival and numerous other festivals such as Mount Beauty Music muster (VIC), Fremantle Fringe Festival (WA), Adelaide festival of 1000 voices (SA), Marrickville festival (NSW), Johnson Park festival (NSW), Pyrmont festival (NSW), La Peña, Bellingen Global festival (NSW), Thredbo World Music Festival

In 2000, during the Sydney 2000 Olympics, Blindman's Holiday performed as part of the city’s Olympic cultural festivities, including events around Darling Harbour at Tumbalong Park, the largest official live site in Sydney .

In 2001, the group undertook a two-month tour across the Top-End of far northern Australia, performing at both large venues (Darwin Entertainment Centre) and remote Aboriginal communities (Borroloola and Jabiru) across Western Australia, the Northern Territory, and Queensland.

== Workshops ==
From 1994 the all-female vocal group presented two shows designed specifically for Music Education across Australia - 'Zingari Voci' and 'Vocal Asia' on regional tours and regional residencies throughout Australia and New Zealand. While primarily working with the Musica Viva InSchool Program for close to 16 years, the group also worked with many other Arts Organisations such as the South East Arts, a Regional Arts Development Organisation of NSW. The ensemble performed and toured with Nora Goodridge Management, the Queensland Arts Council, Regional Arts Victoria in the “Arts To Go Programme”, and other Regional Culture and Arts Organisations across the states of Tasmania, Western Australia and South Australia.

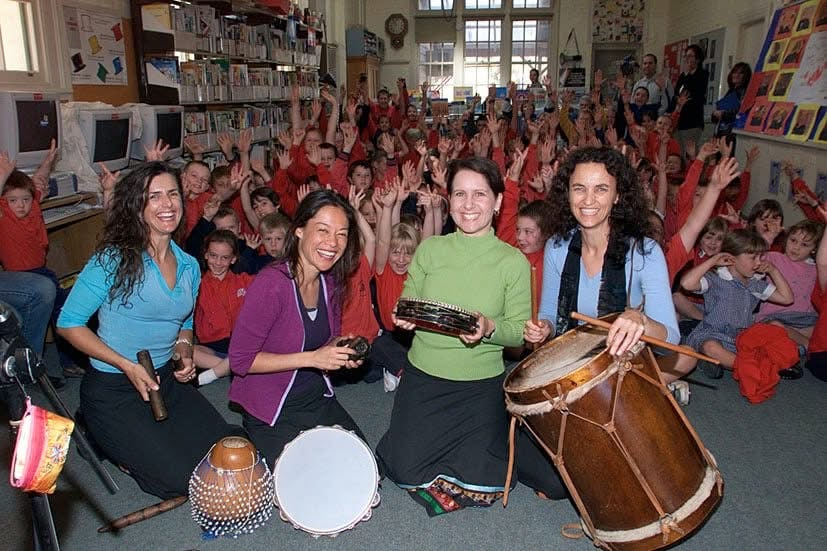
Blindman’s Holiday - Musica Viva Inschools - Linda Marr, Elizabeth Sison, Maria De Marco, Clarita Derwent

From 1995-2001, the band worked with Musica Viva and Correctional Services Australia, creating and delivering a specialised music program for women within the NSW jail system. This consisted of conducting workshops on composition and performance skills, culminating in annual concert performances.

== Musical style ==
Blindman's Holiday specialised in unaccompanied vocal music, combining close harmony singing with vocal and body percussion. Their repertoire drew on tribal, contemporary, and traditional music, ranging from ballads and original compositions to Balkan harmonies and Latin rhythms. Critics noted the ensemble's layered harmonies, rhythmic complexity, and ability to move between contrasting styles. Their repertoire reportedly included material influenced by Hildegard von Bingen, Macedonian folk song, Afro-Cuban salsa, and other global vocal traditions. They are referenced by Seth Jordan in his book The Rough Guide to World Music: Australia

== Discography ==
- 1989, four years after coming together as a band, Blindman's Holiday released their first self-titled album. It was available on vinyl, cassette, and compact disc. This release also coincided with the group’s first European tour.
- 1992, their second album, Archipelago followed. This album was highly successful and received critical acclaim.
- 1997, as a quintet they released their fourth album Airport Lounge.
- 2003, the children’s album Work Play Sleep was recorded and released.
- 2006, the group’s final album About Time was released.
- Historic recordings and release information are also documented through the Last FM Blindman's Holiday page.

They also appeared on compilation albums:

- Subdina - (techno music with Macedonian influences) by the Artist Maxim, also known as Robert Szardov
- The group appeared on Totally Wireless (The Triple J Acoustic Sessions) in 1993, a recording associated with the Australian national youth broadcaster Triple J.
- In 2014 they recorded "Behind Barbed Wire" by Alistair Hulett, for the album Reclaim Your Voice, with all funds going to the Asylum Seekers Resource Centre of Melbourne.
- They recorded and performed with many other artists such as Bu Baca Diop, and Tigramuna.

== Reception ==
Blindman's Holiday received sustained critical attention during its peak years in the late 1980s and 1990s. Reviews frequently highlighted the ensemble's harmonic precision, breadth of repertoire, and energetic performance style. Commentators also drew attention to the group’s use of vocal and body percussion to create dense rhythmic textures without instrumental accompaniment. The Sydney Morning Herald described the ensemble as "surely the best a cappella group in Australia" and “offering miraculous harmonies” Bruce Elder Their live work was often characterised as theatrical, accessible, and educational, with performances that contextualised the musical traditions from which their repertoire was drawn.

"Their sound is complex and cleverly constructed but they perform it with feeling and wit", Rolling Stone 1998

== Awards ==
Contemporary A Cappella Society (CASA)

- Best Folk/World Album 2004 Award Runner-Up (2nd Place) :
- Blindman's Holiday - Work Play Sleep (Winner: Sweet Honey in the Rock - Women Gather)

CASA is an organisation that represents tens of thousands of contemporary a cappella groups around the US and world.

== Legacy ==
After the group ceased full-time touring, former members remained active in Australian music, working as choir directors, in many Australian community vocal projects, and singing for health.

Founding and long-term members, including Linda Marr, Gemma Turner, Clarita Derwent, and Christina Mimmocchi, later became associated with other vocal projects. While during COVID19, and after a hiatus of 11 years, three members of Blindman’s Holiday went on to form the vocal group The Third Voice, still performing today.
