= Always Be (Kulcha song) =

Single by Kulcha

from the album Take Your Time
- Released: April 1997
- Length: 4:17
- Label: EastWest
- Songwriter(s): Matthew O'Connor; Eric Palu
- Producer(s): Matthew O'Connor

Kulcha singles chronology
"Do You Like It?" (1996)	"Always Be" (1997)	"Treat Her Like a Lady" (1997)

"Always Be" is a song by Australian R&B band Kulcha. It was released in April 1997 as the second single from the band's second studio album Take Your Time. The song peaked at number 25 in Australia and 34 in New Zealand.

== Track listing ==
=== CD single ===
1. "Always Be" - 4:17
2. "Feel the Funk" - 3:25
3. "Always Be" (instrumental) - 4:16

== Charts ==
Chart (1997)	Peak position
Australia (ARIA)	25
New Zealand (Recorded Music NZ)	34
