= A Million Year Girl =

Studio album by Max Sharam
- Released: 15 May 1995
- Genre: Pop
- Length: 46:54
- Label: Discovery/Warner Music
- Producer: Daniel Denholm

Max Sharam chronology
Coma (1994)	A Million Year Girl (1995)	The Gods Envy (2014)

Singles from A Million Year Girl
- 1. "Coma" Released: 24 October 1994; 2. "Be Firm" Released: 10 April 1995; 3. "Lay Down" Released: 17 July 1995; 4. "Is It OK if I Call You Mine?" Released: February 1996

A Million Year Girl is the debut studio album by Australian singer Max Sharam. The album was released on 15 May 1995 and peaked at number 9 on the ARIA chart and was certified gold.

At the ARIA Music Awards of 1995 the album was nominated for four awards; winning the ARIA Award for Best Cover Art.

== Reception ==
Professional ratings
Review scores
Source	Rating
AllMusic	3/5 stars
Anthony Horan	9/10 stars

Anthony Horan said "This is a debut album that hides its secrets in the songs themselves, and the trip inside them is well worth it. While a bit more weirdness wouldn't have gone astray, as a career opener, this is more than just a little impressive."

== Track listing ==
A Million Year Girl track listing
No.	Title	Writer(s)	Length
1.	"Be Firm"	Max Sharam, Daniel Denholm, James D'Arcy	3:47
2.	"Coma"	Max Sharam	3:43
3.	"Purple Flower"	Max Sharam	4:19
4.	"Lay Down"	Melanie Safka	4:01
5.	"Is it Okay if I Call You Mine?"	Paul McCrane	2:59
6.	"A Toast To ..."	Max Sharam	0:18
7.	"Jezu's Jewellery" (Backing vocals by Wendy Matthews)	Max Sharam	4:00
8.	"Hunting Ground"	Max Sharam, Daniel Denholm	4:29
9.	"Can I Catch Fire?"	Max Sharam	3:57
10.	"Alice"	Max Sharam, Stevie Nicks, Hine	4:34
11.	"Learning to Let Go"	Max Sharam	2:51
12.	"Raining Angels"	Sharam, Giancarlo De Matteis	4:11
13.	"Orchestra au Naturel"	Sharam, John D'Arcy	3:45
Total length:			46:54

== Personnel ==
- Tony Allayialis – vocals
- Wendy Berge – viola
- Aud Bill – double bass
- Tim Bruer – piano
- Amanda Brown – mandolin, violin
- Lucie Miller – celli viola
- Ian Cooper – violin
- Rebecca Daniel – violin
- Daniel Denholm – bass, guitar, piano, guitar (bass), guitar (electric), French horn, keyboards
- Phillip Hartl – violin
- Alex Hewetson – bass
- Kirsty Hilton – violin
- Nick Mainsbridge – keyboards
- Wendy Matthews – vocals
- Sofie Michalitsianos – vocals
- Connie Mitchell – vocals
- Anthony "Jake" Morgan – cello
- Ben Nightingale – guitar (electric)
- Paul Prestige– guitar (electric)
- Mark Punch – guitar (acoustic)
- Christian Pyle – guitar (acoustic)
- Terepai Richmond – drums
- Max Sharam – vocals
- Jenny Taylor – violin
- Ben Whatmore – guitar (electric)

Production

- Tom Blaxland – assistant engineer
- Brent Clark – mixing
- Virginia Commerford – mixing
- Daniel Denholm – programming, producer, string arrangements
- Nick Mainsbridge – engineer, drum programming, mixing, assistant producer
- Phil Munro – mixing assistant
- David Nicholas – mixing
- Dominic O'Brien – design

== Charts ==
=== Weekly charts ===
Weekly chart performance for A Million Year Girl
Chart (1995)	Peak position
Australian Albums (ARIA)	9

=== Year-end charts ===
1995 year-end chart performance for A Million Year Girl
Chart (1995)	Rank
Australian Albums (ARIA)	85

== Certifications ==
Certifications for A Million Year Girl
Region	Certification	Certified units/sales
Australia (ARIA)	Gold	35,000^{^}
^{^} Shipments figures based on certification alone.
