= Speakeasy (D.I.G. album) =

Studio album by D.I.G.
- Released: September 1995
- Studio: Trafalgar Studios
- Genre: Acid jazz, electronic
- Label: id/Phonogram, Verve Forecast

D.I.G. chronology
Dig Deeper (1994)	Speakeasy (1995)	Curvystrassse (1998)

Singles from Speakeasy
- 1. "Futures" Released: August 1995

Speakeasy is the second studio album by Australian acid jazz band D.I.G. and was released in September 1995. The album peaked at number 8 on the ARIA charts.

At the APRA Music Awards of 1996, the single "Futures" won the Most Performed Jazz Work.

== Track listing ==
Disc 1

1. "Hot Cakes" - 5:47
2. "Futures" - 3:37
3. "Third Stroke" - 3:50
4. "You Get the Crime" - 4:15
5. "The Last Minute" - 4:16
6. "First Steps" - 5:52
7. "History? (Is This the End of)" - 5:58
8. "Same Like B3" - 2:49
9. "Klunky" - 4:45
10. "Fringe Dweller" - 6:23
11. "Merlin's Muse" - 4:21

Disc 2 - Live at the Basement

1. "History" - 5:59
2. "Sweet Thing" - 9:00
3. "Klunky" - 8:37
4. "Pythonicity" - 10:31
5. "Fringe Dweller" - 9:00
6. "Taylor's Cube" - 13:58
- Disc 2 recorded live at The Basement in Sydney in January 1995.

== Charts ==
Chart (1995)	Peak position
Australian Albums (ARIA)	8

== Release history ==
Country	Date	Format	Label	Catalogue
Australia	September 1995	CD, 2CD	Id, Phonogram	5285392
Japan	1995	CD	Verve Forecast	PHCR-1369
