= Greedy People =

Single by Electric Hippies

from the album The Electric Hippies
- Released: May 1994
- Recorded: 1993
- Studio: Charing Cross Studios, Sydney
- Length: 2:41
- Label: rooArt
- Songwriter(s): The Electric Hippies
- Producer(s): The Electric Hippies

Electric Hippies singles chronology
"It's Cool" (1993)	"Greedy People" (1994)	"I Believe in You" (1994)

"Greedy People" is a song by Australian psychedelic rock group, Electric Hippies. It was released in May 1994 as the second single from the group's debut studio album The Electric Hippies. The song peaked at number 29 on the Australian ARIA Charts.

At the ARIA Music Awards of 1995, the song was nominated for Best Video.

== Track listing ==
CD single (rooArt 4509950542)

1. "Greedy People" - 2:41
2. "Little Miss Star" - 2:59
3. "Letter of Apology" - 3:18
4. "I'm Leaving (Reprise)" - 3:03 (German bonus track)

== Charts ==
Chart (1994/95)	Peak position
Australia (ARIA)	29
Germany (GfK)	83
