= Bu Baca Diop =

- Also known as: Bu Baca
- Born: Babacar Maurice Diop; Gorée, Senegal
- Origin: Dakar, Senegal
- Genres: Afro jazz; world jazz; mbalax
- Occupation: Musician
- Instrument: Vocals
- Label: Stern's Africa

Babacar Maurice Diop, also known as Bu Baca Diop or Bu Baca, is an Australian-based Senegal-born musician and is the front man of eponymous bands. His music is Afro jazz and world jazz. The album, Stand, was nominated for the 1995 ARIA Award for Best World Music Album.

== Biography ==
Babacar Maurice Diop, was born on Gorée Island, Senegal. He was a member of Dakar-based groups, Star Band de Dakar and then Number One de Dakar, before relocating to Paris and subsequently to Sydney.

In Australia Diop has fronted eponymous ensembles, Bu Baca Diop and Bu Baca, on lead vocals. His music is Afro jazz and world jazz.

Linc Dubwise of The Canberra Times observed that the album, Nagoo (June 1993), used, "a battery of Senegalese percussionists, young Australian jazz innovators and a thoroughly dynamic sound, even more excitement is promised during concert performances."

Bu Baca has a varying membership that has included Malik Diop, Abdoulaye Lefevre, Yamar Diop, Blindman's Holiday, Miles Kuma, Paul Burton, Carl Dimitarga, Adam Armstrong, Elhadj N'dong, Chris Sweeney, Michael Iveson, Alan Dargin, Cameron Hanley, Craig Walters, James Greening, Miroslav Bukovsky, Ababacar, Lypso Aboud, Victor Rounds, Chris Frazier, Lisa Parrott, Sunil De Silva, Keef West, Jason Gubbay, Con Settineri, Scott O'Hara, Laye Diop, Hadg Diop, Ronnie, Melanie and Lie.

His album, Stand was released in 1994. Opiyo Oloya of RootsWorld felt, "[his] rich Wolof voice soars against the deep response of the didgeridoo while funky horns cut bright swath across the intricate mbalanx drums." At the ARIA Music Awards of 1995, it was nominated for Best World Music Album.

== Discography ==
=== Albums ===
Title	Details	Peak positions
Title	Details	AUS
Nagoo	Released: 1993; Label: Formats: CD	—
Stand	Released: 1994; Label: Larrikin Records (LRF337); Formats: CD	—
Africa	Released: 1996; Label: Bu Baca Diop; Formats: Cassette	—
The Real Sounds of Blackness	Released: Label: Id (0011-2); Formats: CD	—

== Awards and nominations ==
=== ARIA Music Awards ===
The ARIA Music Awards is an annual awards ceremony that recognises excellence, innovation, and achievement across all genres of Australian music. They commenced in 1987.

Year	Nominee / work	Award	Result	Ref.
1995	Stand	Best World Music Album	Nominated	
