= Richard Ingham =

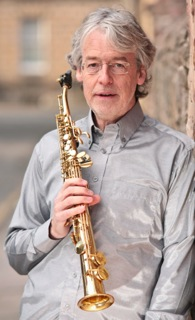

Background information
- Born: 25 March 1954 (age 72)
- Genres: jazz, classical, world
- Occupations: Musician, composer
- Instruments: Saxophone, piano, clarinet, bass clarinet, whistle, WX7 wind controller
- Label: Largo Music

Richard Ingham (born 25 March 1954, Wakefield, West Yorkshire, England) is a composer, performer and educator. He was director of the World Saxophone Congress XVI held July 2012 in St Andrews, Fife, Scotland.

== Biography ==
A graduate of the University of York, his study period at Indiana University with Eugene Rousseau was a major influence on his career. After many years as Visiting Professor of Music at the University of St Andrews, he is now Fellow in New Music and Composer in Residence at the university. He was also Principal Guest Conductor of the National Saxophone Choir of Great Britain in their tours of China and the Czech Republic, and is Principal Conductor of the Aberdeenshire Saxophone Orchestra. His many compositions are frequently performed. Recent works include "Rhynie Man" for solo horn, "Nature Morte au Panier" for solo viola, "Night Invaded the Heavens" (after Ovid) for 15 violas, Robinson, in collaboration with Fife poet Brian Johnstone, for two narrators, two jazz soloists and jazz orchestra. His works for saxophone include "Through a Landscape" and "Walking the Cowgate" for quartet, "Double Concerto" for saxophone, accordion, strings and percussion, "From Pennan to Penang" for saxophone and accordion.

As an educator, Richard was for some years saxophone consultant at the Royal Welsh College of Music in addition to his positions as Professor of Saxophone at both Royal Northern College of Music and Leeds College of Music. Notable past students include Simon Cosgrove, a finalist in the 2010 BBC Young Musician of the Year competition and Andy Goldsmith, saxophonist with RapsodieXarte, who has also performed with one of Richard’s accompanists, Alan Cuckston.

In a recent tour of China and Japan, he gave a jazz workshop at Beijing's Pop Academy, and directed the celebrated 80-strong saxophone orchestra of Showa Academy. As an orchestral player he has worked with the Royal Liverpool Philharmonic Orchestra, the Halle Orchestra, Opera North and the English Northern Philharmonia. He has also worked at the National Theatre, London, (on WX7 and saxophone) on several productions. Concerto performances have included works by Sally Beamish, Charlotte Harding and John Williams.

He released two albums recently – Scenes From a Mountain for saxophone and piano, and From Pennan to Penang for saxophone and accordion. His new solo album, Notes From a Small Country, supported by Creative Scotland, features contemporary repertoire for soprano saxophone and wind synthesiser, including his own works, as well as others by Tom David Wilson, Sally Beamish, Ian Stewart, Charlotte Harding.

He is the editor of the Cambridge Companion to the Saxophone (Cambridge University Press, 1999), published in English and Chinese. He is the President of the Clarinet and Saxophone Society of Great Britain, a member of the Comité International du Saxophone, and a Yamaha artist. He has given recitals in Spain, Poland, Canada, Ireland, USA, India, Slovenia, Latvia and China. He has performed by invitation at every World Saxophone Congress since 1985, and has released several albums. Performances have included UK premieres of works by Ryo Noda, Erwin Schulhoff, Ramon Ricker and François Rossé. He is a member of Trio Verso, and was a member of the Northern Saxophone Quartet for 26 years. He has presented masterclasses in conservatoires in the UK and abroad, and in his capacity as a jazz educator gives many jazz workshops and lectures throughout the country events.

== Publications ==
- Cambridge Companion to the Saxophone – Cambridge University Press, editions in English and Chinese
- Style Masters for Saxophone – Kevin Mayhew Publications
- Music Medals – ABRSM Publishing
- Distant Song in Sax Scorchers – Saxtet Publications
- Mrs Malcolm, Her Reel – Funky Freuchie, Saxtet Publications

== Compositions ==
- Peter and the RTO – for narrator and orchestra was premiered in Edinburgh in 2002
- From Pennan to Penang, a suite for soprano saxophone and accordion was given its first performance in February 2004. Movements: – A Postcard for Peter – The Colours of Kingsbarns – Aumagne Walking – Fog at Whitsand Bay – Picasso and the Temples of Penang – St Patrick Prays For Peace in the Gardens of Craiglockhart – Kuching – Ballyfa Evening – Singapore – Moments with the Golden Tortoise – Two Boats at Oysterhaven – Midsummer in Pennan
- Ballyfa Evening – for solo soprano saxophone, has received many performances, most recently by the Irish saxophonist Gerard McChrystal
- Distant Song – for solo saxophone, premiered in Ireland in 2002
- His Inevitable Lament – for solo saxophone, commissioned and first performed in 2005.
- Through a Landscape – for saxophone quartet, commissioned and premiered in Leeds in 2005 and was performed several times in 2006
- The St Andrews Suite – for jazz orchestra received its first performance in April 2004
- Mrs Malcolm, Her Reel (Funky Freuchie) – has received many performances throughout the UK in various chamber ensemble arrangements. The saxophone choir version is published by Saxtet Publications and was recently performed in China by the National Saxophone Choir of Great Britain, conducted by the composer.
- Double Concerto – for saxophone, accordion and strings was premiered in Scotland in 2005. Movements: – Evening in Hyderabad – Torridon Levels – Return to Kingsbarns
- Nine Pieces for Five Players – for wind quintet was premiered in Cambridge in 2006. Five of the movements are available for saxophone quintet SSATB
- Drift o Rain on Moorland Stane, music with poems by Marion Angus was premiered in St Andrews as part of the StAnza festival in March 2007.
- Taj Mahal – for the National Saxophone Choir of Great Britain (premiered in Birmingham, 2009)
- Fanfare – for brass quintet, premiered in St Andrews in 2009
- Nature Morte au Panier – for solo viola, 2009, commissioned by University of St Andrews
- From Mountain to Sea – Suite for Saxophone Orchestra, 2008, commissioned by Aberdeenshire Saxophone Orchestra. Movements: – From Aboyne to Logie Coldstone – Bennachie – Tunes in the Dunes in June – An African Song in Johnshaven – The Pink Castle – It's Not Cold!?
- Walking the Cowgate – for saxophone quartet, for Scottish Saxophone Ensemble, premiered in Bangkok, July 2009

== Discography ==
- 1987 – Nomad – a solo performance of a commissioned work by Archer Endrich
- 1992 – Second Revolution – with the Northern Saxophone Quartet
- 2001 – Scenes From A Mountain – with pianist Mary McCarthy
- 2003 – The Definitive Ashton Collection – with the Northern Saxophone Quartet
- 2003 – Tribune – with the Tribune Octet
- 2004 – The Cowles Collection – with the Northern Saxophone Quartet
- 2010 – Stormchaser – with Trio Verse
- 2010 – Sax Circus – conducting the National Saxophone Choir
- 2011 – Scenes From A Mountain – re-release with pianist Mary McCarthy
- 2012 – From Pennan to Penang – with pianist Mary McCarthy
- 2012 – Notes From A Small Country

== Ensembles ==
Richard runs many varied music groups across the UK, as listed below.

- Trio Verso
- Aberdeenshire Saxophone Orchestra
- ReBirth of the Cool – Richard and his Organisation
- Relentless Biscuit – Big Band. St. Andrews newest and tastiest band.
- The Really Terrible Orchestra – Guest Conductor
- Ensemble 2021 – Contemporary classical music at the University of St. Andrews
- The Scorch Ensemble – 21st century sax ensemble
- Duo: Richard Ingham (saxophone) and Mary McCarthy (accordion, piano)
- Duo: Richard Ingham (saxophone) and Richard Michael (piano)
- Duo: Richard Ingham (saxophone) and Alan Cuckston (piano)

== Sources ==
- Article title
- http://www.saxtetpublications.com/composers/composer.php?composer=ringham
- http://cassgb.org/president-profile.php?president=Richard-Ingham
- http://norvikmusic.co.uk/html/richard_ingham_-_clarinet_sax
- Richard Ingham (1998). The Cambridge Companion to the Saxophone. Cambridge University Press. ISBN 978-0-521-59666-4.
