= Electric Hippies =

Australian band

- Genre: Psychedelic pop
- Years active: 1993-1995
- Spinoff of: Noiseworks
- Members: Justin Stanley; Steve Balbi

Electric Hippies were an Australian band formed by ex Noiseworks members Justin Stanley and Steve Balbi. The pair also used the same name for their production work. They released a self titled album in 1994 and had a top 30 single with "Greedy People".

As record producers they have worked with Vincent Stone, Juice, Jenny Morris, Nikka Costa and Pearls & Swine.

In February 2023, Balbi and Stanley revealed Electric Hippies are in the studio and working on new material.

== Band members ==
- Justin Stanley - guitar, keyboards, vocals
- Steve Balbi - bass, guitar, vocals

== Discography ==
=== Albums ===
List of studio albums, with release date and label details shown
Title	Album details	Peak chart positions
Title	Album details	AUS
The Electric Hippies	Released: October 1994; Label: rooArt (4509942482); Format: CD	25

=== Singles ===
List of singles, with year released and selected chart positions
Title	Year	Peak chart positions		Album
Title	Year	AUS	GER	Album
"It's Cool"	1993	—	—	The Electric Hippies
"Greedy People"	1994	29	83	The Electric Hippies
"I Believe in You"	1994	76	—	The Electric Hippies
"Jonny Courageous"	1994	—	—	The Electric Hippies
"Didn't Mean to Make You Cry"	1994	—	—	The Electric Hippies

== Awards ==
=== ARIA Music Awards ===
The ARIA Music Awards is an annual awards ceremony that recognises excellence, innovation, and achievement across all genres of Australian music. The Electric Hippies have been nominated for two awards.

Year	Nominee / work	Award	Result
1995	Bob Ellis for "Greedy People"	Best Video	Nominated
1995	Simon Anderson for The Electric Hippies	Best Cover Art	Nominated
