= Kulcha (band) =

Australian R&B band (1993–1999)

- Origin: Sydney, New South Wales, Australia
- Genre: R&B
- Years active: 1993–1999
- Labels: Warner; East West
- Past members: Joe Fidow; Richard Matila; Eric Palu; Jay Whitmore

Kulcha were an Australian R&B band formed in 1993 by four vocalists Joe Fidow, Richard Matila, Eric Palu and Jay Whitmore. They have Samoan or Māori ancestry. They released two studio albums, Kulcha (September 1994) and Take Your Time (May 1997), the former reached No. 13 in Australia and No. 5 in New Zealand. Their top 10 singles are "Shaka Jam" in both markets, and "Don't Be Shy" and "Fly Girl" in New Zealand.

At the ARIA Music Awards of 1995 their self-titled album was nominated for Best Pop Release and "Shaka Jam" was nominated for the Highest Selling Single. Their songs featured on episodes of TV series, Heartbreak High, in 1994, 1995 and 1997.

== History ==
The four members of Kulcha, Joe Fidow, Richard Matila, Eric Palu and Jay Whitmore were all raised in New Zealand but formed their R&B band in Sydney in 1993. They have Māori or Samoan ancestry. Kulcha issued their debut single, "Shaka Jam", in May 1994 via East West Records. It was recorded at Mo Brown Studios with Matthew O'Connor producing. It had been broadcast on Australian Broadcasting Corporation (ABC)'s program, Blackout, series 6, episode 3, which aired in December 1993. It reached No. 7 on the ARIA Singles chart and No. 8 in New Zealand.

Their songs featured on episodes 15 and 38 in Season 1 (1994) of TV series, Heartbreak High with "Shaka Jam", "Spend the Night", "Don't Be Shy" and "Fly Girl"; episode 62 of Season 2 (1995) with "Nasty" and episode 157 of Season 6 (1997) with "Do You Like It?".

== Band members ==
- Joe Fidow
- Richard Matila
- Eric Palu
- Jay Whitmore

== Discography ==
=== Albums ===
Title	Album details	Peak chart positions		Certifications
Title	Album details	AUS	NZ	Certifications
Kulcha	Released: September 1994; Formats: CD; Label: EastWest (4509976772)	13	5	ARIA: Gold
Take Your Time	Released: May 1997; Formats: CD; Label: EastWest / Warner Music Australia (0630186742)	40	—	

=== Singles ===
Title	Year	Peak chart positions		Certifications	Album
Title	Year	AUS	NZ	Certifications	Album
"Shaka Jam"	1994	7	8		Kulcha
"Don't Be Shy"	1994	13	8	RMNZ: Gold	Kulcha
"Fly Girl"	1994	26	4	RMNZ: Gold	Kulcha
"Soul Feeling"	1995	16	16		Kulcha
"Everytime You Go Away"	1995	35	22		non-album single
"Do You Like It?"	1996	18	—		Take Your Time
"Always Be"	1997	25	34		Take Your Time
"Treat Her Like a Lady"	1997	—	—		Take Your Time

== Awards and nominations ==
=== ARIA Music Awards ===
The ARIA Music Awards is an annual awards ceremony held by the Australian Recording Industry Association. They commenced in 1987.

Year	Nominee / work	Award	Result
1995	"Shaka Jam"	Highest Selling Single	WON
1995	Kulcha	Most Popular Australia New Act	WON
