= Do You Like It? =

Single by Kulcha

from the album Take Your Time
- Released: September 1996
- Recorded: 1996
- Length: 3:39
- Label: EastWest
- Songwriter(s): Joe Fidow; Matthew O'Connor; Eric Palu; Jay Whitmore

Kulcha singles chronology
"Everytime You Go Away" (1995)	"Do You Like It?" (1996)	"Always Be" (1997)

"Do You Like It?" is a song by Australian R&B band Kulcha. It was released in September 1996 as the lead single from the band's second studio album Take Your Time. The song peaked at number 18 in Australia.

== Track listing ==
=== CD single ===
1. "Do You Like It" (radio mix) - 3:39
2. "Do You Like It" (12" Dub mix) - 4:12
3. "Do You Like It" (Bubberman Vs JC House mix) - 6:20
4. "Bring It On" (Laidback mix) - 3:34
5. "Do You Like It" (a cappella)

== Charts ==
Chart (1996)	Peak position
Australia (ARIA)	18
