= Single Gun Theory =

Australian electronic dance music band

- Origin: Sydney, New South Wales, Australia
- Genres: Electronic dance, synthpop, downtempo, dream pop, ambient pop
- Years active: 1986–2001
- Labels: Nettwerk, Volition
- Past members: Jacqui Hunt; Kath Power; Pete Rivett-Carnac
- Website: sgt.com.au

Single Gun Theory was an Australian electronic dance music band formed in 1986. Founding mainstay members were Jacqui Hunt on lead vocals; Kath Power on vocal melodies and synthesiser; and Peter Rivett-Carnac on guitar, synthesiser and sampling. They released three studio albums, Exorcise This Wasteland (1987), Millions, Like Stars in My Hands, The Daggers in My Heart Wage War (1991) and Flow, River of My Soul (1994) for Canadian label Nettwerk and Australia's Volition Records. The band’s music combined elements of downtempo electronic music with introspective, ethereal vocals and samples of dialogue. It also released a soundtrack album for Samantha Lang's film The Monkey's Mask in 2000.

== History ==
Single Gun Theory were formed in 1986 in Sydney by Jacqui Hunt on lead vocals; Kath Power on vocal melodies and synthesiser; and Peter Rivett-Carnac on guitar, synthesiser and sampling. They won a band competition run by radio station Double J, which provided free studio recording time. This resulted in their debut album, Exorcise This Wasteland, which was issued by the Canadian label Nettwerk in 1987. The band had been brought to the label's attention by fellow Australian Tom Ellard (of Severed Heads). Exorcise This Wasteland was issued in Australia by Volition Records in the following year. By that time Rivett-Carnac joined Severed Heads' touring line-up for that group's North American tour and Single Gun Theory went into hiatus.

While the band was on hiatus, Hunt and Rivett-Carnac travelled to Asia and Europe, and Power completed a psychiatric therapy course in Sydney. Single Gun Theory reconvened in Vancouver, Canada in May 1991 to record their second album, Millions, Like Stars in My Hands, Daggers in My Heart, Wage War, which was issued in Australia in December. It peaked in the top 50 on the ARIA Albums Chart. Australian musicologist, Ian McFarlane, felt it was "a unique blend of lush, mellow dance grooves, ethnic sampling and fragile, beguiling female vocals." AllMusic's Brendan Swift opined that it provided "Flawlessly executed tracks brushed with Indian, Turkish, and South-East Asian sounds... one that ultimately fails to convey the depth suggested by the new age themes and multicultural music." A single from the album, "From a Million Miles" (November 1991), was used in the pilot episode (April 1994) of Canadian TV series, Due South, and was issued on the series second soundtrack album, Due South, Volume II: The Original Television Soundtrack (1998). It was also used on the soundtrack of the Australian feature film, Reckless Kelly (1993). Another album track, "Great Palaces of Immortal Splendour" was used on The Heartbreak Kid (1993) soundtrack.

The band's third studio album, Flow, River of My Soul, was released in September 1994. It also reached the ARIA Albums Chart top 50. AllMusic's John Bush noticed the group's "change of direction" where they provide "laidback jazzy tones and mixes in various world music samples, while Jacqui Hunt's airy vocals float throughout the album."

Single Gun Theory toured North America, late in 1994, supporting Canadian singer-songwriter, Sarah McLachlan. For their Australian tour in November, they added a percussionist and dancer to their touring line-up. McFarlane declared that the group had "pioneered electronic dance music in Australia. The trio created music through technology, utilising samplers and computers as instruments. Although they rarely performed live, and were hardly prolific, the trio earned a cult following with the release of several captivating albums of dance pop."

Single Gun Theory released a soundtrack album for Samantha Lang's feature film, The Monkey's Mask (November 2000).

In May 2003 Hunt contributed vocals for Endorphin's fourth album, Seduction. Hunt released her debut solo album, Auraphonic, in October 2008.

== Discography ==
=== Albums ===
List of albums, with selected details and chart positions
| Title | Album details | Peak chart positions |
| Title | Album details | AUS |
|---|---|---|
| Exorcise This Wasteland | Released: December 1987; Label: Nettwerk (NTL30010); Formats: CD, cassette | — |
| Millions, Like Stars in My Hands, The Daggers in My Heart Wage War | Released: 1991; Label: Volition (VOLTCD 37); Formats: CD, cassette | 41 |
| Flow, River of My Soul | Released: September 1994; Label: Volition (VOLTCD100); Formats: CD, cassette | 46 |

=== Soundtracks ===
List of soundtracks
| Title | Album details |
|---|---|
| The Monkey's Mask | Released: 2001; Label: ABC Music (ABC 461726-2); Formats: CD |

=== Extended plays ===
List of extended plays
| Title | EP details |
|---|---|
| Single Gun Theory | Released: 1986; Label: Single Gun Theory; Formats: Cassette |
| Burning Bright (But Unseen) | Released: June 1993; Label: Nettwerk (W2-6317); Formats: CD |

=== Singles ===
List of singles, with selected chart positions
| Title | Year | Peak chart positions | Album |
| Title | Year | AUS | Album |
|---|---|---|---|
| "Exorcise This Wasteland" | 1987 | — | Exorcise This Wasteland |
| "Open the Skies" | 1987 | — | Exorcise This Wasteland |
| "Surrender" | 1991 | — | Millions, Like Stars in My Hands, The Daggers in My Heart Wage War |
| "From a Million Miles" | 1991 | 64 | Millions, Like Stars in My Hands, The Daggers in My Heart Wage War |
| "I Am What I See" | 1992 | 153 | Millions, Like Stars in My Hands, The Daggers in My Heart Wage War |
| "Fall" | 1994 | 64 | Flow, River of My Soul |
| "Motherland" | 1995 | — | Flow, River of My Soul |
| "Metaphysical" | 1995 | — | Flow, River of My Soul |

== Awards and nominations ==
=== ARIA Music Awards ===
The ARIA Music Awards is an annual awards ceremony that recognises excellence, innovation, and achievement across all genres of Australian music.

| Year | Nominee / work | Award | Result | Ref. |
|---|---|---|---|---|
| 1995 | Flow, River of My Soul | Best Dance Release | Nominated | |
| 1995 | Flow, River of My Soul | Best Independent Release | Nominated | |
| 2001 | The Monkey's Mask | Best Original Soundtrack | Nominated | |
