= Fly Girl (Kulcha song) =

1994 song by Kulcha

Single by Kulcha

from the album Kulcha
- Released: 12 September 1994
- Length: 4:18
- Label: EastWest
- Songwriters: Gary Johnson; Wayne Daniels; Matthew O'Connor
- Producer: Matthew O'Connor

Kulcha singles chronology
| "Don't Be Shy" (1994) | "Fly Girl" (1994) | "Soul Feeling" (1995) |

"Fly Girl" is a song by Australian R&B band Kulcha. It was released in September 1994 as the third single from the band's debut studio album, Kulcha. The song peaked at number 26 in Australia and number four in New Zealand.

== Track listing ==
1. "Fly Girl" (single mix)
2. "Fly Girl" (album mix)
3. "Bring It On" (album mix)

== Charts ==
| Chart (1994) | Peak position |
|---|---|
| Australia (ARIA) | 26 |
| New Zealand (Recorded Music NZ) | 4 |
