= The Favourite (song) =

Single by D.I.G.

from the album Dig Deeper
- Released: February 1994
- Recorded: July–August 1993
- Studio: Trafalgar Studios, Sydney
- Length: 4:20
- Label: id/Phonogram
- Songwriter(s): Alex Hewetson; Terpain Richmond; Rick Robertson; Tim Rollinson; Scott Saunders
- Producer(s)

D.I.G. singles chronology
"Re-Invent Yourself" (1992)	"The Favourite" (1994)	"2 Way Dreamtime" (1994)

"The Favourite" is a song by Australian acid jazz band, D.I.G. and released in February 1994 as the lead single from the band's debut studio album Dig Deeper. The song peaked at number 63 on the Australian ARIA Charts.

At the ARIA Music Awards of 1995, the song was nominated for Breakthrough Artist – Single.

== Track listing ==
CD single (D11611)

1. "The Favourite" (radio edit) - 4:20
2. "Klunky" (live) - 6:56
3. "The Favourite" (live) - 11:18

== Charts ==
Chart (1994)	Peak position
Australia Singles (ARIA)	63
