= Shaka Jam =

1994 single by Kulcha

Single by Kulcha

from the album Kulcha
- Released: 9 May 1994
- Studio: Mo Brown
- Length: 3:34
- Label: EastWest
- Songwriters: Joe Fidow; Eric Palu; Richard Matila; Matthew O'Connor; Jay Whitmore
- Producer: Matthew O'Connor

Kulcha singles chronology
"Shaka Jam" (1994)	"Don't Be Shy" (1994)

"Shaka Jam" is a song by Australian R&B band Kulcha. It was released in May 1994 as their debut single and as the lead single from their first studio album, Kulcha. The song peaked at number seven in Australia and number eight in New Zealand. At the ARIA Music Awards of 1995, the song was nominated for ARIA Award for Highest Selling Single, losing to "Tomorrow" by Silverchair.

== Track listing ==
Australian CD single

1. "Shaka Jam" (radio edit) – 3:33
2. "Shaka Jam" (extended mix) – 4:09
3. "Shaka Jam" (club mix) – 3:52
4. "Shaka Jam" (12-inch edit) – 6:09

== Charts ==
=== Weekly charts ===
Chart (1994)	Peak position
Australia (ARIA)	7
New Zealand (Recorded Music NZ)	8

=== Year-end charts ===
Chart (1994)	Position
Australia (ARIA)	77
New Zealand (RIANZ)	33
