= Directions in Groove =

Australian acid jazz band

- Also known as: DIG, dig
- Origin: Sydney, New South Wales, Australia
- Genre: Acid jazz
- Years active: 1991–1998; 2008; 2011–2013
- Label: Id/Polygram
- Past members: Alexander Hewetson; Terepai Richmond; Rick Robertson; Tim Rollinson; Scott Saunders; Sam Dixon; Laura Stitt

Directions in Groove or DIG were an Australian acid jazz band which formed in 1991 by Alexander Hewetson on bass guitar, Terepai Richmond on drums and percussion, Rick Robertson on saxophone, Tim Rollinson on guitar and Scott Saunders on keyboards. Originally styled as dig they performed instrumental acid jazz before Saunders added vocals. They released three studio albums, Dig Deeper (March 1994), Speakeasy (August 1995) and Curvystrasse (September 1998). At the APRA Music Awards of 1996 they won Most Performed Jazz Work for their track, "Futures". They disbanded in 1998 before reforming in 2008 for selected performances and again 2011 to release a fourth studio album, Clearlight (October 2011).

== History ==
=== 1991–1993: Formation and EP ===
Directions in Groove formed in 1991 in Sydney by Alexander Hewetson on bass guitar, Terepai Richmond on drums and percussion, Rick Robertson on saxophone, Tim Rollinson on guitar and Scott Saunders (ex-Deckchairs Overboard, Beatfish, also in Bellydance) on keyboards. Hewetson, Richmond and Robertson were, "all graduates of the New South Wales Conservatorium of Jazz." Styled as dig they initially performed instrumental acid jazz before Saunders added vocals. They became popular with a residency at Kinselas in Oxford St, Sydney.

The band toured nationally and in April 1993 released a five-track, self-titled extended play. This attracted Polygram records to sign the band. The Canberra Times' Linc Dubwise observed, "[the] acid jazz group, however, delights in the potential of jazz as accessible, entertaining, populist and, above all, danceable. The acid label is no more than a convenient identifier for the current generation of artists melding elements of jazz, fusion, funk, rap, soul and world music." They continued touring in the following year, Hewetson left to join rock, funk, disco group, Swoop; he was replaced on bass guitar by Sam Dixon.

=== 1994–1998: Dig Deeper, Speakeasy and Curvystrasse ===
DIG released their first studio album, Dig Deeper, in March 1994. It peaked at No. 6 on the ARIA Albums Chart, and was certified gold by Australian Recording Industry Association for shipment of 35,000 units. Nicole Leedham of The Canberra Times observed, "It attracts both older jazz audiences and younger rock followers and keeps them both happy." The group changed their name to Directions in Groove, to avoid confusion with a Canadian group, dig, which was touring internationally. Dig Deeper had its international release via Verve, and they undertook tours in Australia and Europe. In July 1994 they performed at Battersea Park, London for Britain's first B & S Ball. They also toured supporting other artists, Herbie Hancock and Bootsy Collins. At the ARIA Music Awards of 1995, they were nominated for two awards; ARIA Award for Breakthrough Artist – Album and ARIA Award for Breakthrough Artist – Single (for "The Favourite").

Directions in Groove released their second album, Speakeasy in August 1995, which was co-produced by the group with Jeremy Allom (Incognito, Björk, Massive Attack). It reached No. 8 on the ARIA Albums Chart. Australian musicologist, Ian McFarlane, compared their first two albums, "[this] was a more mature, confident and ultimately more durable album... It was a fine collection of sweet, funky jazz-grooves backed up impeccable musicianship." Christo of Tharunka magazine felt Dixon provides, "a big thick meaty bass line that pumps solidly through each track. This new bass sound coupled with the beautifully inventive drumming of Terapai Richmond allows the other musicians to fly high, confident in the rock solid rhythm section. The listener is at ease and floats with the band to places silky smooth and be-bop groovy." A limited release version of Speakeasy included a bonus disc of six live tracks recorded at the Basement, Sydney.

At the APRA Music Awards of 1996 they won Most Performed Jazz Work for "Futures".

A third studio album, Curvystrasse was released in September 1998, and was co-produced by the group with Lex Wilson. The album peaked at number 35 on the ARIA Chart. The group disbanded shortly after.

=== 2008–present: Reformation and Clearlight ===
The original members of the group reformed in the wake of playing to a packed crowd in June 2008. During 2011 Laura Stitt joined on lead vocals, they subsequently recorded their fourth studio album, Clearlight, which was released on 14 October 2011.

== Members ==
- Alexander Hewetson – bass guitar (1991–94, 2008)
- Terepai Richmond – drums, percussion (1991–98, 2008, 2011–13)
- Rick Robertson – saxophone (1991–98, 2008, 2011–13)
- Tim Rollinson – guitar (1991–98, 2008, 2011–13)
- Scott Saunders – keyboards, vocals (1991–98, 2008, 2011–13)
- Sam Dixon – bass guitar (1994–98)
- Laura Stitt – vocals (2011–13)

== Discography ==
=== Studio albums ===
List of studio albums with chart positions and certifications
Title	Details	Peak chart positions	Certifications
Title	Details	AUS	Certifications
Dig Deeper	Released: March 1994; Label: Id, Phonogram, Verve Forecast(518609-2); Format: CD, cassette	6	ARIA: Gold
Speakeasy	Released: August 1995; Label: Id, Verve Forecast (528539-2); Format: CD	8	
Curvystrassse	Released: September 1998; Label: EMI (7243497161-2); Format: CD	35	
Clearlight	Released: 14 October 2011; Label: ABC Music (2775603); Format: CD, digital download	—	

=== Live album ===
List of live album with selected details
Title	Details
Live 1999 @ Milton Theatre & The Basement	Released: 2003; Label: Watt Music (Watt003); Format: CD

=== Extended play ===
List of extended plays with selected details
Title	Details	Peak chart positions
Title	Details	AUS
Directions in Groove	Released: 1992; Label: Id, (iD 0009-2); Format: CD	89

=== Singles ===
List of singles, with selected chart positions
Title	Year	Peak chart positions	Album
Title	Year	AUS	Album
"Re-Invent Yourself"	1992	—	Directions in Groove
"The Favourite"	1994	63	Dig Deeper
"2 Way Dreamtime"	1994	99	Dig Deeper
"Futures"	1995	83	Speakeasy
"Crime"	1996	—	non-album single
"Upside"	1998	—	Curvystrassse
"Strangers Talking"	2011	—	Clearlight

== Awards and nominations ==
=== APRA Awards ===
The APRA Awards (Australia) are annual awards to celebrate excellence in contemporary music, which honour the skills of member composers, songwriters, and publishers who have achieved outstanding success in sales and airplay performance.

Year	Nominee / work	Award	Result
1996	"Futures"	Most Performed Jazz Work	Won

=== ARIA Music Awards ===
The ARIA Music Awards is an annual awards ceremony that recognises excellence, innovation, and achievement across all genres of Australian music. Directions In Groove have been nominated for three awards.

Year	Nominee / work	Award	Result
1994	"Re-invent Yourself"	Breakthrough Artist – Single	Nominated
1995	"The Favourite"	Breakthrough Artist – Single	Nominated
1995	Dig Deeper	Breakthrough Artist – Album	Nominated

=== Mo Awards ===
The Australian Entertainment Mo Awards (commonly known informally as the Mo Awards), were annual Australian entertainment industry awards. They recognise achievements in live entertainment in Australia from 1975 to 2016.

Year	Nominee / work	Award	Result (wins only)
1996	Directions In Groove	Jazz Group of the Year	Won
