= Coma (EP) =

Single by Max Sharam

from the album A Million Year Girl
- Released: 24 October 1994
- Length: 3:35
- Label: EastWest
- Songwriter(s): Max Sharam
- Producer(s): Daniel Denholm

Max Sharam singles chronology
"Coma" (1994)	"Be Firm" (1995)

Max Sharam EPs chronology
I'm Occupied (1984)	Coma (1994)	The Gods Envy (2015)

"Coma" is a song by Australian singer-songwriter Max Sharam. In 1992, she performed the song on Australian talent show New Faces, which led to an extended play album being released in October 1994 and as the lead single from her debut studio album A Million Year Girl (1995). The song peaked at number 14 in Australia. At the ARIA Music Awards of 1995, the song was nominated for three awards: Single of the Year, Song of the Year and Breakthrough Artist – Single.

== Reception ==
Anthony Horan said "A five track EP, it's a remarkable piece of work that sounds quite unlike anything else you'll hear this year. While the title track, courtesy of a very radio-friendly mix, has just been added to the playlists of chart-fodder radio stations after a large amount of play on Triple J, there's a lot more to Max than meets the eye. The EP's brief journey takes in everything from twisted jazz-pop to searing acoustic emotion to very, very strange and rather wonderful operatic experimentation."

== Track listings ==
Extended play (4509976752)

1. "Coma (A Million Year Girl)" – 3:46
2. "Hunting Ground" – 4:33
3. "U Cradle Me" – 3:46
4. "Is It Ok...?" – 2:59
5. "Crash Landing" – 4:24

CD single (4509993912)

1. "Coma (A Million Year Girl)" – 3:46
2. "U Cradle Me" – 3:46
3. "Crash Landing" – 4:24

== Charts ==
Chart (1995)	Peak position
Australia (ARIA)	14
