= Don't Be Shy (Kulcha song) =

1994 single by Kulcha

Single by Kulcha

from the album Kulcha
- Released: 4 July 1994
- Length: 3:52
- Label: EastWest
- Songwriters: Joe Fidow; Matthew O'Connor
- Producer: Matthew O'Connor

Kulcha singles chronology
| "Shaka Jam" (1994) | "Don't Be Shy" (1994) | "Fly Girl" (1994) |

"Don't Be Shy" is a song by Australian R&B band Kulcha. It was released in July 1994 as the second single from the band's debut studio album, Kulcha. The song peaked at number 13 in Australia and number eight in New Zealand.

== Track listing ==
1. "Don't Be Shy" (radio edit) - 3:52
2. "Don't Be Shy" (album edit) - 4:09
3. "Don't Be Shy" (Gangsta mix) - 4:10
4. "Shaka Jam" (radio edit) - 4:08

== Charts ==
=== Weekly charts ===
| Chart (1994) | Peak position |
|---|---|
| Australia (ARIA) | 13 |
| New Zealand (Recorded Music NZ) | 8 |

=== Year-end charts ===
| Chart (1994) | Peak position |
|---|---|
| Australia (ARIA) | 90 |
| New Zealand (RIANZ) | 37 |
