= Directions in Groove (EP) =

EP by DIG
- Released: 1992
- Recorded: 1992
- Studio: Paradise Studios
- Label: id
- Producer: Matt Hayward

DIG chronology
Directions in Groove (1992)	Dig Deeper (1994)

Singles from Directions in Groove
- 1. "Re-Invent Yourself" Released: 1992

Directions in Groove is the debut extended play by Australian acid jazz band DIG and was released in 1992. The album peaked at number 89 on the ARIA charts.

== Reception ==
Linc Dubwise from The Canberra Times said "[the] acid jazz group... delights in the potential of jazz as accessible, entertaining, populist and, above all, danceable. The acid label is no more than a convenient identifier for the current generation of artists melding elements of jazz, fusion, funk, rap, soul and world music."

== Track listing ==
1. "Re Invent Yourself" – 5:20
2. "Sweet Thing" – 5:53
3. "Taylor's Cube" – 4:41
4. "Heaven On Earth" – 6:36
5. "Freezerville" – 4:30

== Charts ==
Chart (1993)	Peak position
Australia Singles (ARIA)	89

== Release history ==
Country	Date	Format	Label	Catalogue
Australia	1992	CD	Id	iD0009-2
