= Dig Deeper (album) =

Studio album by DIG
- Released: March 1994
- Recorded: July/August 1993
- Studio: Trafalgar Studios
- Genre: Acid jazz, electronic
- Length: 64:58
- Label: id/Phonogram, Verve Forecast

DIG chronology
Directions in Groove (1992)	Dig Deeper (1994)	Speakeasy (1995)

Singles from Dig Deeper
- 1. "The Favourite" Released: February 1993; 2. "Two Way Dreamtime" Released: October 1993

Dig Deeper is the debut studio album by Australian acid jazz band DIG and was released in March 1994. The album peaked at number 6 on the ARIA charts and was certified gold.

At the ARIA Music Awards of 1995, the album was nominated for the Breakthrough Artist – Album.

== Track listing ==
Disc 1

1. "Two Way Dreamtime" – 6:05
2. "Medium Rare" (Interlude) – 1:35
3. "The Favourite" – 5:50
4. "D.N.A." (Interlude) – 1:24
5. "Pythonicity" – 5:17
6. "Shelflife" – 5:01
7. "Hip Replacement" – 5:53
8. "Suffer the Children" (Interlude) – 1:40
9. "Gil" – 6:57
10. "The DIG Theme" – 5:40
11. "The Den" (Interlude) – 0:25
12. "Terrified from Dizzy Heights" – 7:39
13. "Re-Invent Yourself" (Re-Mix) – 5:23
14. "Inner Blue Funk" – 6:14

Disc 2 (Bonus Disc) DIG Live

1. "Re-Invent Yourself" – 8:45
2. "The Favourite" – 11:21
3. "Same as B3" – 6:03
- Disc 2 recorded live at The Basement in Sydney on 2 December 1993

== Charts ==
=== Weekly charts ===
Chart (1994)	Peak position
Australian Albums (ARIA)	6

=== Year-end charts ===
Chart (1994)	Position
Australian Albums (ARIA)	92

== Certification ==
Region	Certification	Certified units/sales
Australia (ARIA)	Gold	35,000^{^}
^{^} Shipments figures based on certification alone.

== Release history ==
Country	Date	Format	Label	Catalogue
Australia	March 1994	CD, 2CD	Id, Phonogram	5186092
North America	1994	CD	Verve Forecast	314518609-2
Japan	1994	CD	Quattro	QTCY-2046
