= The Electric Hippies =

Studio album by Electric Hippies
- Released: October 1994
- Studio: Charing Cross Studios
- Label: rooArt
- Producer: Electric Hippies

Singles from The Electric Hippies
- 1. "It's Cool" Released: 1993; 2. "Greedy People" Released: May 1994; 3. "I Believe in You" Released: September 1994; 4. "Jonny Courageous" Released: October 1994; 5. "Didn't Mean to Make You Cry" Released: December 1994

The Electric Hippies is the debut and only studio album by Australian dance group, Electric Hippies. It was released in October 1994 and peaked at number 25 on the ARIA Charts.

At the ARIA Music Awards of 1995, Simon Anderson's work was nominated for Best Cover Art.

== Track listing ==
The Electric Hippies track listing
No.	Title	Length
1.	"Didn't Mean to Make You Cry"	4:03
2.	"I Believe In You"	2:50
3.	"Greedy People"	2:39
4.	"Nothing to Lose"	2:24
5.	"Johnny Courageous"	3:11
6.	"It's Cool"	2:24
7.	"Acid Lady"	2:52
8.	"Schizophrenic Terry"	3:56
9.	"And"	0:58
10.	"My Turn to Cry"	3:24
11.	"Precious"	3:26
12.	"Falling Star"	4:53
13.	"I'm Leaving"	2:53
14.	"I'm Leaving" (reprise)	2:59

== Charts ==
Chart (1994)	Peak position
Australian Albums (ARIA)	25

== Release history ==
Region	Date	Format	Label	Catalogue
Australia	October 1994	CD	rooArt	4509942482
