= Take Your Time (Kulcha album) =

Studio album by Kulcha
- Released: May 1997
- Label: EastWest /Warner Music Australia
- Producer: Matthew O'Connor

Kulcha chronology
Kulcha (1994)	Take Your Time (1997)

Singles from Take Your Time
- 1. "Do You Like It?" Released: September 1996; 2. "Always Be" Released: April 1997; 3. "Treat Her Like a Lady" Released: September 1997

Take Your Time is the second and final studio album released by Australian R&B band Kulcha. The album was released in May 1997 and peaked a number 40 on the ARIA charts.

== Track listing ==
1. "Intro" - 1:35
2. "Do You Like It?" - 3:38
3. "Booty Funk" - 3:53
4. "Always Be" - 5:06
5. "Take Your Time" - 3:15
6. "Slow Motion" - 4:21
7. "Fly Girl" (Interlude) - 1:37
8. "All I Want" - 3:49
9. "Treat Her Like a Lady" - 3:53
10. "Give It to Me" - 3:49
11. "I Wanna Know" - 3:42
12. "Give Me Your Love" - 3:55

== Charts ==
Chart (1997)	Peak position
Australian Albums (ARIA)	40

== Release history ==
Region	Date	Label	Format	Catalogue
Australia	May 1997	EastWest /Warner Music Australia	CD, Compact cassette	0630186742
