= Max Sharam =

Australian entertainer

- Born: Benalla, Victoria, Australia
- Genre: Chamber pop
- Occupations: Musician; singer; songwriter
- Instruments: Vocals; electronic organ; guitar
- Years active: 1990–present
- Label: Warner
- Website: maxsharam.com

Max Sharam is an Australian-American multi-disciplinary artist and singer-songwriter. In the mid-1990s, Sharam had three top 40 hit singles in Australia, "Coma", "Be Firm" and "Lay Down", from her top 10 album A Million Year Girl (1995). She received eight nominations at the ARIA Music Awards of 1995; winning Best Cover Art with Dominic O'Brien for the album.

== Career ==
=== Early Europe ===
Sharam spent several years travelling around Europe where she initially made a living from busking. Sharam, while based in Rome, was part of a bohemian community of artists that included Kurt Wenner known for his groundbreaking street art. Whilst performing in Florence, Italy, Carlo Picone, a RAI news journalist and producer, invited her to audition for Forza Venite Gente, a hit Italian rock opera, starring Oreste Lionello, for which she landed a lead role. The musical toured across Europe for two years. Other Italian Theatre productions engaged her, including Kolbe directed by Polish film director – Krzysztof Zanussi and Tadeaus Bradecki. She received the Star of the Year award at Genoa's Cole Porter Festival, recorded and released a dance extended play, "I'm Occupied". Her story was documented in an Italian television program, La Ragazza con la Chitarra ("Girl with the Guitar"), shown on RAI TV.

=== Climax and Comedy ===
Sharam spent a year in Japan studying Taiko drums and fronting a Japanese band Climax based in Hiroshima before returning to Australia where she worked as a stand-up comedian, performing regularly on the Sydney Comedy Circuit. She also appeared on Red Faces, Hey Hey it's Saturday TV.

=== 1990s ===
In 1992, Sharam performed her self-penned song "Coma" on the television talent show New Faces, reaching the finals and attracting the attention of a number of record companies:

I did the TV spot to make a statement, because I thought it was fucking mad—all this mediocre stuff that goes on all over television. I thought, why doesn't anybody get up and represent my generation—that side of Australia that's so readily ignored? That compelled me to get on New Faces. All the phones started ringing after that. I was very lucky.

Soon after, under the banner of Max Sharam: The Sounds of Sirens, she was performing regular sell-out solo acoustic shows at Kinselas nightclub in Darlinghurst.

=== 1994–1999: A Million Year Girl ===
Sharam signed a recording contract with Warner Music Australia in 1994, which issued her debut EP, Coma, in October – produced by Daniel Denholm and Nick Mainsbridge – with the song peaking at No. 14 on the ARIA Singles Chart during February 1995.

"Coma" was voted the eighth-most popular song on radio station, Triple J's Hottest 100 of 1994. Her debut album, A Million Year Girl, was released in May 1995, achieving gold accreditation and reaching No. 9 in the ARIA Albums Chart.

At the ARIA Music Awards of 1995 Sharam was nominated in eight categories, losing to Tina Arena and Silverchair, but winning ARIA Award for Best Cover Art for the album with Dominic O'Brien. The album spawned two more Top 40 singles, "Be Firm" (No. 25 in June) and "Lay Down (Candles in the Rain)" (a cover of Melanie Safka's song, which reached No. 36 in November). Her fourth single, "Is It OK If I Call You Mine?", a cover written by Paul McCrane for the film Fame, was released in February 1996 but peaked outside the top 100. After several subsequent sell-out national tours, Sharam disappeared from the Australian mainstream music scene moving to Los Angeles for several years. Sharam re-appeared in Channel 9's TV documentary Dream Factory, shot in Los Angeles.

=== 2000–2009 ===
In 2000, Sharam moved to Manhattan, New York where she continued to write. She wrote and staged her first one-woman show, MadmoselleMax, for the Melbourne International Comedy Festival. In January 2005, she performed "Butterfly Suicide" at the Hong Kong Fringe Festival.

In 2006, Sharam portrayed Jean Lee in the musical The Hanging of Jean Lee, which was based on a biographical book of poems by Jordie Albiston. The score was written by Australian composer Andree Greenwell and the musical played at Sydney Opera House alongside Hugo Race.

Sharam performed and produced the music for 2006 AFI award winning documentary Forbidden Lie$ and in 2007 wrote, performed and produced the closing credit song for Expired, a movie starring Samantha Morton, Jason Patric, Illeana Douglas and Teri Garr.

In 2008 Sharam continued to tread new ground and experiment with platforms, creating video performance based art. She was invited to join the New York Foundation for the Arts, a not-for-profit arts organization, panel for Video Art. In February 2009 Sharam returned to the Melbourne International Comedy Festival with her show Songs and Stories from My Suitcase. and followed it up with another more experimental production ″Bushpygmalion″ which featured Sharam's animated artworks in a semi-autobiographical tale. In June, 2017 her performance art was part of an exhibit in Fabrik der Künste in Hamburg, Germany as part of a retrospective for German painter, Tania Jacobi and then in September 2018 as part of the inaugural Ballarat Biennale of Australia Art (BOAA).

=== 2010-2020 ===
Sharam is a Master of Fine Art (MFA) and studied Animation Direction at Australian Film Television & Radio School (AFTRS, Sydney) before graduating from RMIT's Centre for Animation & Interactive Media (AIM) in 2011. In 2011 she was a finalist in the APRA Professional Development Awards and in 2013 The Vanda & Young Songwriting Competition. Sharam also created the music and sound design for the play Anaconda, which won 'Best Original Play' at Hollywood Fringe Festival in 2012.

In April 2019, Max performed "Society" at the APRA Music Awards of 2019. and appeared in Back Roads (ABC TV, "Beaufort" episode) — discussing the cultural significance of preserving historic buildings in the small country town of Beaufort, Victoria, also reflected on the Rainbow Serpent Festival as a modern cultural counterpart. [ref: ABC iview, Back Roads, "Beaufort"]

Sharam portrayed the ghost of Jean Lee in the docudrama A Miscarriage of Justice based on the hanging of Ronald Ryan.

=== POST COVID ===
2026 Max wrote and produced her first short film. Crowded River {Writer / Co-Director / Producer / Composer} Official Selection, Nyack International Film Festival; Official Selection, WILDsound Film & Screenplay Festival (Canada); WON: Best Visual Design. [ref: IMDb, tt40806904]

Contributed an essay to Loving Arrangements: Stories About Modern Living and Loving (Rutgers University Press, June 2026), [ref: rutgersuniversitypress.org/loving-arrangements/9781978844544]

And wrote and produced a new work Mezzo Cuckoo: Diva Gone Dada a genre-defying hybrid of opera, comedy, and live art; it draws on the full range of Sharam's practice while pushing into unmapped territory. Hailed by audiences at Adelaide and Sydney Fringe Festivals as "mind-blowing" for its originality and powerful message. [ref: adelaidefringe.com.au/fringetix/max-sharam-is-mezzo-cuckoo-af2026]

Max Sharam is also a sessional academic at the University of Sydney.

== Discography ==
=== Studio albums ===
List of studio albums, with selected chart positions and certifications
Title	Album details	Peak chart positions	Certifications
Title	Album details	AUS	Certifications
A Million Year Girl	Released: 15 May 1995; Label: EastWest (4509995732); Format: CD, cassette	9	ARIA: Gold

=== Extended plays ===
List of extended plays
Title	Album details
I'm Occupied released under the artist name, Mex	Released: 1984; Label: Notte Antica; Format: vinyl record, cassette
Coma	Released: 1994; Label: Warner Australia; Format: CD, cassette
The Gods Envy	Released: July 2015; Label: Max Sharam; Format: Digital download|streaming

=== Singles ===
Year	Title	Peak chart positions		Album
Year	Title	AUS	Hottest 100	Album
1994	"Coma"	14	8	A Million Year Girl
1995	"Be Firm"	25	—	A Million Year Girl
1995	"Lay Down"	36	—	A Million Year Girl
1996	"Is It OK If I Call You Mine?"	108	—	A Million Year Girl
2013	"Hysteria (The Gods Envy)"	—	—	The Gods Envy
"—" denotes a recording that did not chart or was not released in that territory.

== Awards and nominations ==
=== ARIA Music Awards ===
The ARIA Music Awards is an annual awards ceremony that recognises excellence, innovation, and achievement across all genres of Australian music. Sharam won 1 award from 8 nominations.

Year	Nominee / work	Award	Result
1995	"Coma"	Single of the Year	Nominated
1995	"Coma"	Song of the Year	Nominated
1995	"Coma"	Breakthrough Artist - single	Nominated
1995	"Coma" (Paul Elliott)	Best Video	Nominated
1995	A Million Year Girl	Best Female Artist	Nominated
1995	A Million Year Girl	Best New Talent	Nominated
1995	A Million Year Girl	Breakthrough Artist - Album	Nominated
1995	A Million Year Girl (Dominic O'Brien and Max Sharam)	Best Cover Art	Won
