= The Monkey's Mask =

2000 film by Samantha Lang

- Movie poster
- Directed by: Samantha Lang
- Written by: Anne Kennedy; Dorothy Porter
- Produced by: Robert Connolly; John Maynard
- Starring: Susie Porter; Kelly McGillis; Abbie Cornish
- Cinematography: Garry Phillips
- Edited by: Dany Cooper
- Music by: Jacqui Hunt; Antony Partos; Kathleen Power; Pete Rivett-Carnac
- Distributed by: Footprint Films; Strand Releasing
- Release date: 13 September 2000
- Running time: 93 minutes
- Countries: Australia; Canada; France; Italy; Japan
- Language: English
- Box office: $45,826 (USA sub-total); A$150,177 (Australia)

The Monkey's Mask is an international co-production 2000 thriller film directed by Samantha Lang. It stars Susie Porter and Kelly McGillis. Porter plays a lesbian private detective who falls in love with a suspect (McGillis) in the disappearance of a young woman. The film is based on the 1994 verse novel of the same name by Australian poet Dorothy Porter.

At the ARIA Music Awards of 2001 the soundtrack was nominated for Best Original Soundtrack Album.

== Plot ==
In Australia, a young woman called Mickey reads a poem to an audience at a bar. When she leaves, she gets into an unseen person's car.

Jill Fitzpatrick is a former police officer turned private detective, who investigates missing persons. She gets a job to look for Mickey, who has been missing for two weeks. Jill goes to Mickey's university and meets her poetry professor, Diana. Jill is quickly attracted to Diana, who is married. They meet several times for coffee, not always talking about Mickey, and go out for a drink. They eventually have sex.

Jill hears from Mickey's parents that Mickey's body has been found. They want Jill to continue investigating because the police are "no help". Jill continues working but is distracted by her affair with Diana. One day Diana's husband catches them together, but he is not bothered.

Jill's friend Lou introduces her to the poet community. She meets two poets, Bill and Tony, both of whom are older men who were having sexual relationships with Mickey. Neither want to talk to Jill. Jill reads some of Mickey's poems that were written about Bill. Sexually explicit, Diana calls them "victim poetry" and calls Mickey a "nympho". Jill starts receiving threatening telephone messages from someone with their voice disguised. Mickey's flatmate gives Jill a video taken of Mickey in the bar the night she went missing.

One night Diana chokes Jill during sex to achieve erotic asphyxiation. Later Diana asks her if she enjoyed it. Jill says she cannot remember. Jill meets Bill who tells her that Mickey "broke" him and made him write filth. He says he has evidence connected to the case and will come to Jill's house with it. On his way to her house, Bill's car explodes and he dies.

Jill tells Diana that Bill had told her about some "evil" poems Mickey had written. Diana says they must track them down. Jill begins to wonder who else was in Mickey's life and asks Diana if Mickey ever wrote poems for her. Diana says she does not know, but that Mickey was straight, that other women were just competition to her. Jill gets upset that Diana seems unconcerned by Mickey's death, and leaves.

She goes to Brisbane to meet the poet Tony. He tells her that Mickey kept a diary, that she handed it in to Diana as a poetry assignment. Later, Jill breaks into Diana's office but the diary is gone. She now knows that Diana has lied to her. Tony's wife Barbara comes to see Jill. She tells her that Diana tampered with Bill's car and that Diana has been seeing Tony for months and is crazy about him. She told Tony that Jill seduced her.

Jill goes home to find it broken into. The video of Mickey has been destroyed. Jill finds the copy of the tape she made and watches it. She sees Diana on the tape, talking to Mickey. She then sees Mickey leave the bar with Diana and her husband.

Jill meets Diana's husband Nick. She asks him if he loves Diana. He says yes, and that Jill does too. He flirts with her and they begin to have sex. He puts his hand on her throat and she asks him if he killed Mickey. He tells her he did, and that Diana was there. It was a sex game that went wrong.

Jill takes her evidence to the police. She meets Diana who tells her that if she tells anyone what she knows, they will sue her. Meanwhile, the police look at the evidence and listen to an audio tape Jill took of Nick confessing.

== Cast ==
- Susie Porter as Jill Fitzpatrick, private investigator
- Kelly McGillis as Professor Diana Maitland, married university professor who begins an affair with Jill
- Abbie Cornish as Mickey Norris, university student who disappears and is later found dead
- Brendan Cowell as Hayden
- Bojana Novakovic as Tianna
- Jean-Pierre Mignon as Tony Brach, poet who was having an affair with Mickey, and is also seeing Diana
- Caroline Gillmer as Barbara Brach, Tony's wife
- John Noble as Mr. Norris, Mickey's father
- Linden Wilkinson as Mrs. Norris, Mickey's mother
- Chris Haywood as Dad Fitzpatrick, Jll's father
- Deborah Mailman as Lou, Jill's friend
- Marton Csokas as Nick Maitland, Diana's husband
- William Zappa as Detective Sergeant Wesley, Jill's old boss in the police force
- Jim Holt as Bill McDonald, poet who was having an affair with Mickey
- John Batchelor as Steve (uncredited)

== Reception ==
=== Critical response ===
On the review aggregator website Rotten Tomatoes, 42% of 31 critics' reviews are positive, with an average rating of 5.2/10. Metacritic, which uses a weighted average, assigned the film a score of 49 out of 100, based on 16 critics, indicating "mixed or average" reviews.

A. O. Scott for The New York Times wrote "[t]here is something charming about the movie's vision of poetry as a sleazy, glamorous pursuit" but called Lang's direction "flat" and "paceless" and criticised the "painfully expository script" for "some astonishingly bad dialogue." Ronald Mangravite for the Miami New Times called it "run-of-the-mill" and "very, very routine." He comments that "[a]s film noir, this is routine straight-to-video material. As lesbian cinema, it's hardly groundbreaking material." Paula Nechak's review for the Seattle Post-Intelligencer is more positive and praises Susie Porter, who she says "radiates intelligence and carries an accessible sexiness to the screen."

== Awards and recognition ==
The Monkey's Mask won the Australian Screen Sound Guild award for Soundtrack of the Year in 2001. Susie Porter won the award for Best Actress at the Dallas OUT TAKES festival also in 2001.

== See also ==
- Cinema of Australia
