= Ilse de Ziah =

- Genres: Irish Music, Classical, Popular Music, Film Music
- Occupation(s): Performer, Arranger, Composer, Teacher, Director
- Instrument: Cello
- Years active: 2002-Present
- Website: http://ilsedeziah.com/

Ilse de Ziah is an Australian cellist currently living in Cork, Ireland. She performs within multiple genres of music including baroque, classical, contemporary, popular music, film music, jazz, rock, self-composed works, and the folk music of Australia and Ireland. She is known for her arrangement and creation of repertoire for solo cello and especially for her adaptations of Irish traditional tunes and airs for solo cello.

== Biography ==
De Ziah has been resident in County Cork since the 2000s. Since moving to Ireland, she has completed a master's degree in music from the Cork School of Music and performs and tours within Ireland and Europe.

De Ziah's arrangement process involves frequent listening, research, and adaptation of the melody to include melody, harmonic accompaniment, and embellishment on solo cello. Her compositions and arrangements focus on creating melodies that allow the music to be accessible to performers at a range of skill levels as well as expressive to perform on solo cello without additional accompaniment.

Based on her experience playing in Irish traditional music sessions, she has arranged both tune melodies and accompaniments so that a player can participate in a traditional music session in both melody and accompaniment roles. In her books Trad on Cello: Traditional Irish Tunes in Cello Friendly Keys (2016) and Easy Irish Cello: Slow Session Tunes and Traditional Irish Favourites (2019), she adapted the melody of each tune to be in a key in which the cellist can play the melody without having to shift their left hand up and down the instrument. This allows the cellist to be able to play the melody in a way that is similar to a fiddle player, in one position on the instrument, and so that they can focus more attention and energy on the movement of the bow. As a part of these books, she also included rhythmic accompaniments allowing for participation in a way that is similar to how guitar players participate in sessions – rhythm and harmonic support through playing basic chords.

De Ziah listens to a range of singers and instrumentalists to arrange Irish airs with a core melody, ornamentations, embellishments, and harmonic additions that she finds to best express the emotion and the story behind each Irish air. This process involves extensive research into the history of the air itself and locating a range of performances by multiple artists, both instrumentalists and singers. She then chooses the ornamentation and embellishment styles that she finds to be expressive within the melody on cello and uses these in her arrangements. She encourages cellists to listen to other performers and to choose their own embellishments that they find to be the most personally expressive.

In 2014, De Ziah collaborated with filmmaker Maarten Roos to create a documentary titled Living the Tradition: An Enchanting Journey into Old Irish Airs, which discusses the providence, histories, and performance techniques of ten Irish airs through interviews with musicians and scholars. The film also includes performances of each of those airs in the areas where they are documented to have originated. This film won Best Documentary at the Erie International Film Festival in 2014 and the Fan Award at the Consonance Music and Dance Film Festival 2020. To complement the documentary, she created a solo album of her performances of the airs and published a book of her arrangements of the airs. The album and book are both titled Irish Airs for Solo Cello.

De Ziah tutors chamber music at University College Cork. She also runs an annual Irish Cello Retreat every summer in Ireland and has run other workshops in Europe on improvisation and Irish traditional playing techniques for cello. De Ziah is the musical director of the Cork Light Orchestra, a community orchestra of amateur and semi-professional musicians with various levels of experience. She is also the co-artistic director of the Midleton Arts Festival.

De Ziah has composed original works as well as arranged works for solo cello. Her arranged works consist of film music, classical music, popular music, and Irish traditional music. She is most known for her use of Irish traditional music as a source material to create contemporary arrangements for solo cello.

De Ziah performs most often in solo concerts and on her YouTube channel, where she has included performances of her arrangements and compositions. She is also a member of the Scarlet String Quartet and the Quiet Music Ensemble. The Quiet Music Ensemble is a group which performs a unique and Irish style 'deep listening' music in European contemporary music festivals. She was a featured soloist in summer 2018 with the Irish Gamelan Orchestra in Java at the largest Gamelan festival in the world. She also performs with many traditional, rock, pop, jazz, classical, and world musicians in collaborative performances.

== Discography ==
- Irish Airs for Solo Cello (2010)
- Transcendence (2020)
- Here & There (2023) De Ziah & Date
