= Guus Berkhout =

Dutch engineer and professor

Augustinus Johannes "Guus" Berkhout (born 1 April 1940) is a Dutch engineer who has worked for the oil and gas industry, and as a professor of geophysics.

Berkhout started his career working for Shell. Between 1976 and 2007, he served as professor of acoustics, geophysics and innovation management, at Delft University of Technology. From 2000 to 2002 he was chair of a commission dealing with projected sound norms at Amsterdam Airport Schiphol, from which he resigned after feeling the commission's independence was undermined by the Ministry for Transport and Water Management. In 2019, Berkhout co-founded the Climate Intelligence Foundation (Clintel), which opposes the idea that there is a "climate emergency".

== Early life and education ==
Berkhout was born in 1940 in Den Helder. He studied electrical engineering at Delft University of Technology and obtained his degree in 1963. In 1970 he obtained a PhD cum laude in physics from the same university.

== Career ==
In 1964 Berkhout started working for Royal Dutch Shell. In 1976 he returned to Delft University of Technology, and became a professor of acoustic imaging and sound control. In 1987 he also became professor of geophysics. In 1998 he joined the board of the university, he stepped down in 2001, before the end of his term, due to differences with other board members in vision on the future of the university. In 2001 he became professor of innovation management and he retired from the university in 2007. Berkhout has pleaded against the increase of bureaucratic processes at universities.

During his time at Delft University Berkhout was the founder and scientific director of the Delphi Consortium, which does seismic research for a consortium of oil and gas companies.

== Public sector ==
Berkhout was chair of the independent Commission Experts Airplane sound from mid 2000 to December 2002. On request of the House of Representatives the Dutch Minister for Transport and Water Management, Tineke Netelenbos, instigated the commission. The commission was to look into the sound norms for Amsterdam Airport Schiphol for the upcoming five years. Berkhout resigned as chair after having the feeling that the independence of the commission was hindered by the Ministry, and having to wait for approval of a measurement plan for over half a year. The whole commission resigned, citing they had been actively worked against by the Ministry.

For the 2006 Dutch general elections Berkhout had planned to form a new party with several scientists and entrepreneurs, but did not enter the elections, seeing the huge increase in new parties contesting the election.

== Climate Intelligence Foundation ==
Berkhout founded the Netherlands-based organization Climate Intelligence Foundation (CLINTEL). Mid 2019 plans of CLINTEL and Berkhout were leaked showing that they were organizing a campaign against political commitments to net zero carbon emissions being made into law. The campaign features a number of academics and industry figures with ties to groups skeptical of the anthropogenic global warming theory, as well as members from oil and gas companies. Berkhout claimed the ideal of the organization was to provide an alternative to the Intergovernmental Panel on Climate Change.

In late September 2019 the group produced an open letter presenting a "European Climate Declaration" on behalf of business figures, promoting common misinformation, asserting that there is no climate emergency. A fact check performed by climate scientists for the pro-anthropogenic global warming theory group Climate Feedback gave the letter an overall scientific credibility very low, describing it as biased, cherry-picking, inaccurate and misleading, noting only some of the signers described themselves as climate scientists, despite the letter claiming to represent "500 scientists and professionals". The document was later renamed the "World Climate Declaration" to reflect many added signers from outside Europe.

== Honours and distinctions ==
Berkhout was elected a member of the Royal Netherlands Academy of Arts and Sciences in 1990.

In 2008 he was made an Officer in the Order of Orange-Nassau.
