= Alan Cuckston =

English harpsichordist (1940–2025)

- Born: 2 July 1940; Horsforth, England
- Died: 22 March 2025 (aged 84)
- Education: King's College, Cambridge
- Occupations: Harpsichordist; Conductor; Pianist; Lecturer
- Organization: Barber Institute of Fine Arts

Alan George Cuckston (2 July 1940 – 22 March 2025) was an English harpsichordist, pianist, conductor and lecturer. He recorded for the BBC, especially on historic instruments. Cuckston was the harpsichordist in the 1968 Proms concert of Monteverdi's Vespro della Beata Vergine by the Monteverdi Choir, conducted by John Eliot Gardiner. He toured internationally with the Academy of St Martin in the Fields and Pro Cantione Antiqua. He recorded a broad repertoire of music for keyboards instruments, including the complete piano works by Alan Rawsthorne.

== Life and career ==
Cuckston was born in Horsforth near Leeds on 2 July 1940, to Percy Cuckston and his wife Florence née Titchmarsh, the third of their six children. He studied music with Fanny Waterman and Lamar Crowson and at King's College, Cambridge, where he studied with Thurston Dart, from 1959 to 1963. He became a keyboard soloist for the BBC featured frequently. He taught at the Barber Institute of Fine Arts at the University of Birmingham from 1965 to 1969.

He made his debut at Wigmore Hall in 1965, playing with the Lydian Ensemble. In 1968, he was harpsichordist for a Proms concert at the Royal Albert Hall of Monteverdi's Vespro della Beata Vergine by the Monteverdi Choir, the Philip Jones Brass Ensemble and the English Chamber Orchestra, conducted by John Eliot Gardiner. The same year he played the world premiere of the Harpsichord Sonata by Ronald Stevenson at the Harrogate Festivals.

Cuckston was recognised internationally; specialising in early keyboard instruments (harpsichord, organ and fortepiano), Cuckston gave concerts in many parts of Europe and North America. He toured as harpsichordist with the Academy of St Martin in the Fields and as organist with Pro Cantione Antiqua.

Cuckston produced recordings in a broad repertoire, from medieval music to contemporary. In 1965, he recorded an album of early Scottish music and dances from the Dublin Virginal Manuscript, reviewed by Gramophone: “Cuckston admirably catches the dance spirit of all these with his alert, clean, rhythmically controlled performances.” He recorded music by Handel, John Tomkins, Matthew Locke, Purcell, William Croft, John Blow, Fritz Hart, Rameau and Couperin (Naxos Records). Cuckston studied the music played in the Brontë family household and recorded A Musical Evening with the Brontë Family in 1979. In 1991 he recorded piano pieces by Herbert Howells and Armstrong Gibbs. Cuckston's organ playing was described as of "bright tone and impeccable, unobtrusive and exemplary playing".

Cuckston was a friend of Alan Rawsthorne and recorded Rawsthorne's complete piano music for Swinsty Records. Cuckston authored a tribute to Rawsthorne in The Creel, a journal of the Rawsthorne Trust. He recorded Britten’s Cabaret Songs with jazz singer Norma Winstone.

Cuckston commissioned a piece for the Cuckston Trio for clarinet, viola and piano from Dick Blackford. He commissioned works for harpsichord from Elizabeth Maconchy, Stevenson, Phillip Ramey, David Wooldridge, and Kenneth Leighton. He had a harpsichord built by John Rooks of Ticknall, Derbyshire, based on a 1638 harpsichord made by Andreas Ruckers for playing Baroque music. He owned a one-manual organ, dated 1742 and made by Johannes Schnetzler, with its ownership attributed to Handel.

Cuckston married Joan Vivien Caswell (née Broadbent) in 1965, and became stepfather to her two sons. They had three daughters. The marriage lasted until Joan Cuckston's death in 2008. Alan Cuckston died on 22 March 2025, at the age of 84.{
