= David Paquette =

American jazz pianist

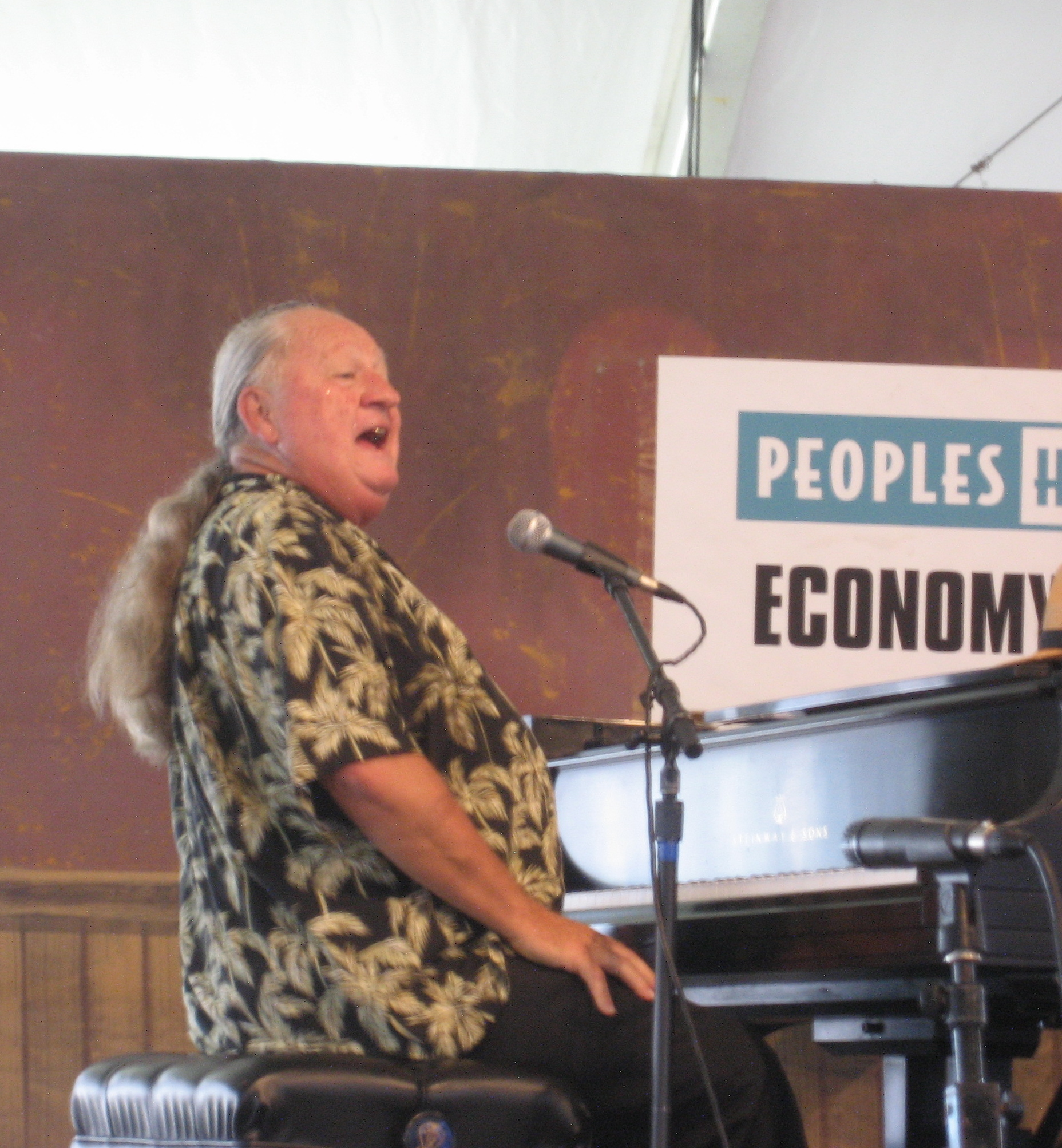
David Paquette

David Paquette (born 1940) is an American jazz pianist. He has recorded more than 53 albums. Highlights of his career include touring the European jazz circuit, establishing and directing a twenty one-year running annual Jazz Festival on New Zealand's Waiheke Island, and years as the musical director for Sydney Australia's Four Seasons Hotel.

== Career ==
Paquette was born in Bridgeport, Connecticut, United States, on March 25, 1950. During his childhood, he was exposed to the New Orleans jazz revival movement of the early 1960s through his parents, who were active in jazz club circles connected to the traditional jazz scene.

As a young musician, Paquette attended informal rehearsals and performances featuring notable New Orleans jazz musicians including Billie and De De Pierce, Louis Nelson, Kid Sheik, Sammy Penn, John Handy, and Kid Thomas Valentine. These early experiences strongly influenced his musical direction and passion for traditional jazz.

Largely self-taught as a pianist, Paquette developed his musical skills through listening, improvisation, and live performance. While attending Louisiana State University, he performed regularly at Pat O’Brien's in the French Quarter of New Orleans, where he refined both his piano and vocal performance style.

Following university, Paquette worked in Aspen, Colorado, performing in ski resorts and restaurants before relocating to San Francisco in the late 1960s. Initially performing as a street musician, he later became house pianist at the Boarding House nightclub.

During this period, he opened performances for emerging artists including Bette Midler, Taj Mahal, The Pointer Sisters, Dr. John, and comedian Steve Martin.

In 1973, Paquette relocated to Maui, Hawaii, after discovering the Pioneer Inn during a vacation. He performed there for approximately twelve years, becoming a prominent figure in the local music scene. His debut album was produced during this time by Fleetwood Mac bassist John McVie.

While based in Hawaii, Paquette collaborated with musicians including Amos Garrett, Maria Muldaur, Bonnie Raitt, Kenny Loggins, Turk Murphy, and Trummy Young.

International touring

In 1983, Paquette undertook an extensive European tour with British clarinettist Sammy Rimington, jazz vocalist Lillian Boutté, and other performers associated with the New Orleans jazz tradition.

Throughout the 1980s and 1990s, he appeared at jazz festivals across Europe, Australia, and New Zealand, including multiple appearances at the New Orleans Jazz & Heritage Festival.

In 1984, Paquette served as musical director for Australian comedian Spike Milligan's touring production in Australia.

His international career has included performances in Indonesia, Mauritius, Greece, Scandinavia, Bulgaria, Senegal, and throughout the South Pacific.

New Zealand and Waiheke Island

After relocating permanently to New Zealand, Paquette settled on Waiheke Island in 2001. There, he founded the Waiheke Island Jazz Festival, which developed into one of New Zealand's recognised boutique jazz festivals.

During his time in New Zealand, Paquette also performed with the Auckland Symphony Orchestra and became involved in arts and cultural development initiatives throughout the country.

Later relocating to Wairoa in Northern Hawke's Bay, he became associated with regional music and arts projects, including the restoration and promotion of a rare 1893 Steinway Model C concert grand piano discovered in a local community hall.

Paquette also serves as Patron of the Poverty Bay Blues Club in Gisborne.

The Paquette Jazz Foundation

Paquette founded The Paquette Jazz Foundation, a charitable trust aimed at supporting emerging jazz musicians through scholarships, mentoring initiatives, workshops, and artist retreat programs on Waiheke Island.

The foundation was established to encourage the preservation and development of jazz performance traditions while fostering opportunities for younger musicians.

Musical style and influences

Paquette's musical style draws heavily from traditional New Orleans jazz, stride piano, blues, swing, and Hawaiian musical influences developed during his years living in Maui.

His performances are characterised by improvisation, storytelling, humour, and strong audience interaction. He has frequently cited early New Orleans jazz musicians as his primary artistic influences.

Personal life

Paquette has spoken publicly about struggles with addiction during the early years of his career, including periods of amphetamine and alcohol dependency. By the early 1980s, he made the decision to give up alcohol, drugs, and cigarettes entirely and has credited sobriety with helping him rebuild both his life and musical career.

He currently resides in Wairoa, New Zealand.
