= Bernard Berkhout =

Dutch musician

Bernardus Johannes Berkhout (April 18 - 1961, Santpoort - June 23 - 2026, Barendrecht, the Netherlands) was a family doctor, best known as a jazz clarinetist.

== Medicine ==
Berkhout studied medicine at the University of Leiden, the Netherlands, where he graduated in 1992. From 1992 until 2005, he worked as a doctor of orthopaedic medicine in Amsterdam (Kliniek Jan van Goyen Kade, Medisch Centrum Noord). From 1997 until 2000, he specialized in becoming a general practitioner. Since 2002, he has been working as a GP in Dordrecht, the Netherlands.

== Musical career ==
Bernhard Berkhout started playing the clarinet in 1970. Berkhout was discovered in the 1980s by the pianist Pim Jacobs, who presented him on Dutch television as a soloist with The Metropole Orkest under Rogier van Otterloo, together with the clarinettist Eddie Daniels. Subsequently, Berkhout founded a successful quintet with the vibraphonist Frits Landesbergen called The Swingmates. In the early 1990s, Berkhout was chosen by the Schilperoort family as a future leader of the Dutch Swing College Band, an appointment which was prevented by others after the death of Peter Schilperoort in 1990. As a result, Schilperoort's widow's wish was never granted.

Even though Berkhout had won numerous awards such as the Edison Grammy Award, soloist award at the Breda Jazz Festival and the Peter Schilperoort Bandleaders Award, his musical activities dwindled in the 1990s, as he became more involved in medicine.

== Recent musical work ==
In 2004, Berkhout read a book by Lewis Erenberg called Swingin’ the Dream about the role of popular music in the Great Depression. He discovered that a new culture had bonded with popular music in the Swing era, like in the ‘Sixties’. Moreover, he concluded "that jazz was never so popular and popular music was never so sophisticated" as in the 1930s. In 2006, Berkhout started a long-term project next to his work as a doctor. He chose the format of clarinet-soloist with a big band as exemplified by Benny Goodman and Artie Shaw in the 1930s and 1940s. In 2008, "Doctor Bernard and His Swing Orchestra" was born.

Meanwhile, dancing has grown in popularity. The 1930s dance the Lindy Hop fits his music. In 2010, this sparked the idea to record a CD for the dancing audience, called Let’s Dance. In 2011, the band visited Great Britain and Denmark and in July of the same year, the band was the top attraction at The Amsterdam Lindy Exchange, where dancers from all over the world gathered to dance to swing music. The Band toured Switzerland and France in 2012.

There is now also a smaller music project called "Bernard Berkhout and Friends" which meets once a month in a Club and play together Jazz.

== Band members ==
Doctor Bernard And His Swing Orchestra consists of Berkhout (clarinet); Mirjam van Dam (voice); Erik van der Weijden, Hans Goemans, Kurt Schwab and Bert Brandsma (saxophone); Nanouk Brassers, Michael Varekamp, Koos van der Hout (trumpet); Jack Coenen, Marcus Glas (trombone); Mark van der Feen (piano); Hans Voogt(guitar); Frans Bouwmeester (bass); Barry Olthof (percussion).

== Selected discography ==
- 1986 - Ode aan Benny Goodman, with the Pim Jacobs Trio
- 1987 - Fascinating Rhythm, The Swingmates (Edison Award)
- 1987 - Airmail Special, The Swingmates
- 1988 - Fascinating Rhythm
- 1990 - Pennies from Heaven, The Swingmates
- 1991 - You’d be so nice to come home to, Bernard Berkhout clarinet, Jeroen Koning guitar
- 1992 - Have you met miss Bell, The Swingmates with Madeline Bell
- 1993 - Have You Met Miss Bell?
- 1994 - Royal Flush, with Ian Cooper and Ian Date (Australia)
- 1994 - Das Sonnenzeichen Krebs
- 1995 - Jazz at the Philharmonic
- 2006 - 4beat6, “The music of Benny Goodman”
- 2006 - Roots, with the Rosenberg Trio
- 2010 - Let’s Dance, Doctor Bernard And His Swing Orchestra
