= The Power of One =

The Power of One or Power of One may refer to:

== Music ==
- "Power of One" (song), a 1995 single by Merril Bainbridge
- The Power of One (album), a 2009 album by Israel Houghton
- "The Power of One" (song), a 2000 single by Donna Summer from the Pokémon: The Movie 2000 soundtrack
- The Power of One (soundtrack), soundtrack to the 1992 film
- The Power of One, a song by Sonata Arctica on the album Silence
- Power of One, an album by Lizard. Also a song on the album of the same name.

== Film and television ==
- The Power of One (film), a 1992 film based on the novel of the same name
- The Power of One (TV series), an Australian television series
- The Power of One, a segment of Pokémon: The Movie 2000
- "The Power of One", a children's program on the Christian-based Smile television network
- Cheetah: The Power of One, Hindi title of the 2005 Indian Telugu-language film Athadu

== Books ==
- The Power of One (novel), a 1989 novel by Bryce Courtenay
- Power of One, a 2003 book by Christian evangelist of teenagers Ron Luce
- Power of One, a 2023 memoir by Facebook whistleblower Frances Haugen#Memoir: The Power of One

== Other ==
- The Power of One, a Canadian solar car team

== See also ==
- Power of two (disambiguation)
