= Let Sleeping Dogs Lie =

Let Sleeping Dogs Lie is a title of multiple works of literature, music, cinematography based on an English proverb, "let sleeping dogs lie":

== Music ==
- Let Sleeping Dogs Lie, a 2015 album by Junkyard Choir
- Let Sleeping Dogs Lie, a 1983 album by Julia Downes
- Let Sleeping Dogs Lie, a 2008 album by Ricardo Garcia
- "Let Sleeping Dogs Lie", a song by Sheena Easton from the 1983 album Best Kept Secret
- "Let Sleeping Dogs Lie", a song by Michael Schenker Group from the 1982 album One Night at Budokan
- "Let Sleeping Dogs Lie", a song by Yngwie Malmsteen from the 2012 album Spellbound
- "Let Sleeping Dogs Lie", a song by Cassandra Vasik from the 1993 album Feels like Home
- "Let Sleeping Dogs Lie", a song by Pop Shuvit from the 2006 album Amped & Dangerous

== Television ==
- "Let Sleeping Dogs Lie", a 2021 episode of Selling Sunset
- "Let Sleeping Dogs Lie", a 1968 episode of Beggar My Neighbour
- "Let Sleeping Dogs Lie", a 2001 episode of Men, Women & Dogs
- "Let Sleeping Dogs Lie", a 2017 episode of The Ancient Magus' Bride
- "Let Sleeping Dogs Lie", a 2008 episode of Just Jordan
- "Let Sleeping Dogs Lie", a 2007 episode of Dogstar
- "Let Sleeping Dogs Lie", a 1967 episode of The Informer
- "Let Sleeping Dogs Lie", a 1974 episode of The Liver Birds

== Literature ==
- Let Sleeping Dogs Lie, a 2014 novel by Rita Mae Brown
- "Let Sleeping Dogs Lie", a 2005 comic story in Beasts of Burden
- Let Sleeping Dogs Lie, a 1986 book in the Hank the Cowdog series

== See also ==
- Sleeping Dogs (disambiguation)
- Let Sleeping Dogs..., a 2005 album by The Dogs D'Amour
- Where Sleeping Dogs Lie, a 1991 American neo noir thriller film
- Henry IV, Part 2 by Shakespeare: "Wake not a sleeping wolf"
