= Tlot Tlot =

Australian pop rock band

- Also known as: Man in the Wood (1986-1991)
- Origin: Melbourne, Victoria, Australia
- Genres: Alternative rock, pop rock, indie rock, post-punk
- Years active: 1986–1997
- Labels: Manhole, Anubis, EMI
- Past members: Owen Bolwell; Stanley Paulzen; Andrew Briant

Tlot Tlot (/təˈlɒt təˈlɒt/) were an Australian pop rock band formed in 1986 as Man in the Wood. The original line-up was Owen Bolwell on bass guitar and lead vocals, Andrew Briant on lead guitar, and Stanley Paulzen on drums and lead vocals. Briant left in 1991 and the band name was changed to Tlot Tlot. Their 1995 single, "The Girlfriend Song", reached the ARIA Singles Chart Top 100 and was nominated for Best Pop Release at ARIA Music Awards of 1995. The group issued four albums, A Day at the Bay (1991), Pistolbuttsa'twinkle (1992), The Live Set - Volume 1 (1993) and Fashion Takes a Holiday (1995), before disbanding in 1997.

== History ==
Tlot Tlot formed in Melbourne in 1986 as alternative rockers, Man in the Wood, with Owen Bolwell on bass guitar and lead vocals, Andrew Briant on lead guitar, and Stanley Paulzen on drums and lead vocals. Their debut release was a 7-inch single, "Rain" in 1989, followed by an eight-track extended play, Thumper, released in 1990, which included "Rain". The single and 12" EP were produced by Aka Setkya and Malcolm Dennis for the Manhole Productions label. All the tracks were co-written by Bolwell and Paulzen. The songs on Thumper were much darker than other Tlot Tlot songs.

In 1991, Briant left Man in the Wood and the group were renamed as Tlot Tlot. This band name was taken from the Alfred Noyes poem, "The Highwayman" (1906). As well as the name change, the music style changed from Man in the Wood's dark and depressing post punk to a more poppy style of music with light-hearted and humorous lyrics. Tlot Tlot's first release was a 14-track cassette album, A Day at the Bay, in December 1991. In 1992 they issued their first CD release, Pistolbuttsa'twinkle. The title is also from "The Highwayman". It was closely followed by a single, "Old Mac", which peaked at No. 5 on the 2XX Independent chart in April 1993. Their track "Birthday" appeared on the various artists compilation, Live at the Empress.

In 1993 Tlot Tlot issued a compilation album, Pistolbuttsatwinklea'twinkle, which combined material from Pistolbuttsa'twinkle and A Day at the Bay. Later that year they followed with another album, The Live Set - Volume 1, which contained previously unreleased tracks and new recordings of older ones. The following year, Paulzen formed a side project called Fred Astereo with Briant.

In 1995 they signed to EMI and issued a single, "The Girlfriend Song" in February, which reached the ARIA Singles Chart Top 100. At the ARIA Music Awards of 1995 it was nominated for 'Best Pop Release'. In May of that year, they supported Things of Stone and Wood at the ANU Bar. They released their next studio album, a covers album entitled Fashion Takes a Holiday, in July that year. The album contained covers of Depeche Mode's "Just Can't Get Enough" and the Romantics' "What I Like About You". The band also produced and co-wrote Merril Bainbridge's debut album The Garden that year, which received worldwide success.

"The Girlfriend Song" appeared on the Collision 4 various artists compilation in 1996. A new track entitled "When We Were Young Stars" appeared in April 1997 on another compilation, A Minute or Less, on Candle Records. On 19 July that year, they supported Sydney band the Simpletons at the Punters Club. Tlot Tlot split up later that year.

Bolwell co-wrote Merril Bainbridge's second album Between the Days, while Paulzen formed Ruck Rover with longtime collaborator Robert Clarkson and former Things of Stone and Wood member Michael Allen in 1998. Paulzen and Bolwell both produced Clarkson's EP Beautiful Girls and Beautiful Boys in 1991. Ruck Rover split up in 2004, and Paulzen resurrected his old Tlot Tlot side project Fred Astereo, who released two albums before splitting up. He is now in a band called the Sublets. Bolwell is no longer producing music. He has been married to Bainbridge since 2003. They have two children. He currently works for Bolwell as Marketing Director.

When Tlot Tlot played live, Bolwell and Paulzen played guitars and sang to pre-recorded backing tracks that contained keyboards, drums, bass, and samples. The backing tracks were played from a CD player, similar to They Might Be Giants' use of a tape player in live performances before 1992. Bolwell operated the CD player. Occasionally, the backing track would often misfire, playing before the band were ready. One such misfiring can be heard in a bootleg of the song "Old Mac", recorded live in Tasmania on 13 September 1992. Shortly after Bolwell brings the backing tape under control, Paulzen says "See what happens if we don't operate our own CD machine".

== Personnel ==
- Owen Bolwell – vocals, bass guitar, tape machine (1991–1997), drum programming (1991–1997), lead guitar (1991–1997)
- Stanley Paulzen – vocals, drums (1986–1991), rhythm guitar (1991–1997)
- Andrew Briant – guitar (1986–1991)

== Discography ==
=== Albums ===
Title	Album details
A Day at the Bay	Released: 1991; Label: Manhole Productions (D7476)
Pistolbuttsa'twinkle	Released: 1992; Label: Manhole Productions (MAN666)
The Live Set - Volume 1	Released: 1993; Label: Manhole Productions (MAN093)
Fashion Takes a Holiday	Released: 1995; Label: Manhole Productions

=== Extended plays ===
Title	Album details
Thumper (as Man in the Wood)	Released: August 1990; Label: Manhole Productions (MAN 597)

=== Singles ===
List of singles, with selecte chart positions
Title	Year	Peak chart positions
Title	Year	AUS
"Rain" (as Man in the Wood)	1989	—
"Old Mac"	1992	—
"The Girlfriend Song"	1995	73

== Awards and nominations ==
=== ARIA Music Awards ===
The ARIA Music Awards are a set of annual ceremonies presented by Australian Recording Industry Association (ARIA), which recognise excellence, innovation, and achievement across all genres of the music of Australia. They commenced in 1987.

Year	Nominee / work	Award	Result	Ref.
1995	"The Girlfriend Song"	Best Pop Release	Nominated	
