= A Day at the Bay =

Studio album by Tlot Tlot
- Released: December 1991
- Recorded: Whirled Records, Melbourne, 1991
- Genre: Alternative rock
- Length: 41:54
- Label: Manhole Productions
- Producers: Owen Bolwell, Aka Setkya

Tlot Tlot chronology
Thumper (1990)	A Day at the Bay (1991)	Pistolbutts- a'twinkle (1992)

A Day at the Bay is the debut album by the Australian rock band Tlot Tlot and their first release under that name. It was released in 1991. It was only released on cassette.

Angie Hart from Frente sings on "Marshall".

"Marshall" was later retitled "Under the Water" and completely rerecorded with Merril Bainbridge on vocals, appearing on her debut album The Garden in 1995 and being released as a single.

On Owen Bolwell's website Bubblerr, he mentions that the album was recorded concurrently with Frente's debut EP Whirled.

== Track listing ==
1. Cancer
2. Dog
3. Once or Twice
4. The Bonebass Suttee
5. Love Potion Number Nine
6. Marshall
7. Bella
8. Judas
9. Screaming Lovers
10. Bus
11. Settle
12. Red Shoes
13. Birthday
14. Victor

All songs except tracks 5, 6, 10, 11, 13 and 14 were rereleased on Pistolbuttsa'twinkle in 1992. Track 5 was released as a B-side to the "Old Mac" single in 1992, while tracks 6, 10, 11, 13 and 14 were rereleased on Pistolbuttsatwinkle'atwinkle in 1993. All tracks were remixed, overdubbed and remastered for the CD releases.

== Crew ==
- Stanley Paulzen - lead vocals, guitars
- Owen Bolwell - backing vocals, processed vocals, guitars, bass, drum programming, special effects, keyboards, lead vocals on track 2
- Aka Setkya - producer
- Greg Fields, Colin Mac - saxophones
- Angie Hart - lead vocals on track 6
