= Lonely (Merril Bainbridge song) =

1998 single by Merril Bainbridge

Single by Merril Bainbridge

from the album Between the Days
- Released: April 1998
- Length: 3:34
- Label: Gotham; Universal
- Songwriters: Merril Bainbridge; Owen Bolwell
- Producer: Siew

Merril Bainbridge singles chronology
"Sleeping Dogs" (1996)	"Lonely" (1998)	"I Got You Babe" (1998)

"Lonely" is a song written by Merril Bainbridge and Owen Bolwell, produced by Siew for Bainbridge's second album, Between the Days (1998). It was released as the album's first single in Australia in April 1998 as a CD single. The bridge of the song samples the lyrics from the nursery rhyme "Georgie Porgie".

== Chart performance ==
The song made its debut to the Australian ARIA Singles Chart at number 74, making the song Bainbridge's fifth song to reach the top 100. On its second week, it fell three places to number 77, then jumped nine places to 68 the following week. After six weeks of being in the chart, it entered the top 50 at number 48. Two weeks later, the song peaked at number 40, then dropped out of the top 50 the next week. The song spent a total of three weeks in the top 50 and 17 weeks in the top 100. According to Australian magazine The Music Network, "Lonely" was the most-aired song on Australian radio for 21 weeks. In the US, the track peaked at number 18 on the Billboard Bubbling Under Hot 100 chart, spending four weeks on the listing.

== Track listing ==
Australian and US CD single

1. "Lonely"
2. "Lonely" (alternate mix)
3. "Lonely" (acoustic version)

== Charts ==
Chart (1998)	Peak position
Australia (ARIA)	40
US Bubbling Under Hot 100 (Billboard)	18

== Release history ==
Region	Date	Format(s)	Label(s)	Ref.
Australia	April 1998	CD	Gotham	
United States	July 14, 1998	Rhythmic contemporary; contemporary hit radio	Universal	
