= Under the Water =

1995 single by Merril Bainbridge

Single by Merril Bainbridge

from the album The Garden
- Released: 17 July 1995
- Studio: 001 (Carlton, Victoria)
- Length: 4:13
- Label: Gotham; Universal
- Songwriters: Merril Bainbridge; Owen Bolwell; Stanley Paulzen
- Producer: Siew

Merril Bainbridge singles chronology
"Mouth" (1994)	"Under the Water" (1995)	"Power of One" (1995)

"Under the Water" is a song written in 1990 by Owen Bolwell and Stanley Paulzen, produced by Siew for Australian singer-songwriter Merril Bainbridge's first album, The Garden (1995). The song is about a lover who drowned.

The first version of the song was released in late 1991 on Bolwell and Paulzen's band Tlot Tlot's album A Day at the Bay as "Marshall", featuring Angie Hart from Frente!. The Bainbridge version of the song was released as the album's second single in July 1995 in Australia and February 1997 in the United States. Although it was successful in Australia, reaching number four on the ARIA Singles Chart. In the United States and Canada, the song peaked at numbers 91 and 72, respectively. At the APRA Music Awards of 1996 it won a trophy for Most Performed Australian Work.

== Commercial performance ==
"Under the Water" had commercial success in Australia. In late July 1995 it debuted at number 46 on the ARIA Singles Chart. During its fifth week on the chart, it peaked at number four, making the song Bainbridge's second top-10 single. The song spent a total of 16 weeks in the top 50, and the Australian Recording Industry Association (ARIA) awarded the single a platinum certification for shipping 70,000 copies. It became the 24th-highest-selling single in Australia for 1995, selling an estimate of 80,000 copies around Australia. The song was nominated for an ARIA Award as the "Highest Selling Single" for 1996 but lost to "Let's Groove" by CDB.

The song was released in the United States on 18 February 1997 but failed to replicate the top-10 success of "Mouth", peaking at ninety-one and spending only six weeks on the Billboard Hot 100. It was Bainbridge's last song to chart on the Hot 100.

== Music video ==
There were two music videos produced to promote the song, the first one for Australia and a second version for the United States. The original Australian version was a simple black and white video with Bainbridge walking around a forest and performing the song with a band. However, when Bainbridge broke in the U.S. with her previous single "Mouth", a sleeker video, directed by Martin Kahan, was produced for the American market. It was released in December 1996 and shows a man and a woman in a room filled with water.

== Track listings ==
Australian CD single

1. "Under the Water"
2. "Garden in My Room" (demo)
3. "Mouth" (demo)

US CD and cassette single

1. "Under the Water"
2. "Mouth" (alternate take)

French CD single

1. "Under the Water"
2. "Under the Water" (rhythmic version)

== Charts ==
=== Weekly charts ===
Chart (1995–1997)	Peak position
Australia (ARIA)	4
Canada Top Singles (RPM)	72
Canada Adult Contemporary (RPM)	27
US Billboard Hot 100	91

=== Year-end charts ===
Chart (1995)	Position
Australia (ARIA)	24

== Certifications ==
Region	Certification	Certified units/sales
Australia (ARIA)	Platinum	80,000

== Release history ==
Region	Date	Format(s)	Label(s)	Catalogue	Ref.
Australia	17 July 1995	CD; cassette	Gotham	GOTH 95012; GOTH 95014	
United States	11 February 1997	Contemporary hit radio	Universal	—N/a	
United States	18 February 1997	CD; cassette	Universal	UDS-56112; UCS-56112	
