= Old Mac (song) =

Single by Tlot Tlot

from the album The Live Set - Volume 1
- Released: 8 December 1992
- Recorded: 1992, AVC Records, Melbourne
- Genre: Alternative rock, hard rock
- Length: 4:04
- Label: Anubis
- Songwriter(s): Bolwell/Paulzen
- Producer(s): Tlot Tlot

Tlot Tlot singles chronology
"Rain" (1989)	"Old Mac" (1992)	"The Girlfriend Song" (1995)

"Old Mac" is a song released as the first non-album single by the Australian alternative rock band Tlot Tlot. It was released on 8 December 1992.

== Composition ==
A sample of the song's intro, demonstrating its heavy riffs.

Musically, the song can be considered either hard rock or alternative rock. It uses a xylophone intro followed by heavy guitar riffs which play in the choruses. The riffs' chord progression is a constant D#-F, using two guitars for a thicker sound. The verses have the same drum and bass backing as the chorus, but instead of guitars, a keyboard is used. A different guitar phrase, the notes C-F-F#-A#-F-C-F#-A#-C-A#-C-A#, is used between the verses. The breakdown has stomping on the bass pedal followed by the xylophone intro followed by the between-verses bit, but without the guitars. The chorus then begins again. There is a minor pause before the outro (which is just the chorus repeated four to five times) begins. The end of the song consists of a final strum of the guitar followed by Paulzen bending one of the strings as the song fades out.

Lyrically, the song is about McDonald's and is sung from the point of view of Ronald McDonald (who is only referred to as a "big yellow clown" in the first verse and is not explicitly named until the end).

When Tlot Tlot played the song live, the between-verses bit was played in the intro in place of the heavy guitars, which were placed behind the verses instead of bare keyboards. The chorus was also sung by Paulzen instead of Dixon. In the studio version, Dixon sang "Will anybody be there?", but Paulzen replaced it with "Will Elvis Presley be there?" in the first chorus and "Will Buddy Holly be there?" in the second. With the "No, I don't think so" backing vocal in the chorus, Paulzen sang it in the studio version, but Bolwell would sing it when playing live.

== Track listing ==
All tracks are written by Bolwell/Paulzen except for track 5 by Leiber/Stoller

No.	Title	Length
1.	"Old Mac"	4:04
2.	"Happy Trippy Phil"	0:44
3.	"Dead Blue Fish Caroline"	2:24
4.	"Mother's Fluid"	1:57
5.	"Love Potion No. 9"	3:02

Track 4 previously appeared on Pistolbuttsa'twinkle. A song called "Hearse" was also written and recorded during these sessions, but it went unused and was later released on Ruck Rover's self-titled EP in 1999. Track 5 previously appeared on A Day at the Bay.

The title track would later be released on the album The Live Set - Volume 1 in 1993, however the recording on the album is not the recording featured on this single. It is instead based on the tape used to back Tlot Tlot in live performance, which was recorded in 1990.

== Personnel ==
- Stanley Paulzen - lead vocals, drums, producer
- Owen Bolwell - guitars, bass, xylophone, co-producer
- Natalie Dixon - keyboards, female vocals
