= Pistolbuttsa'twinkle =

Studio album by Tlot Tlot
- Released: March 1992
- Recorded: Whirled Records, Melbourne, 1991
- Genre: Alternative rock
- Length: 42:22
- Label: Manhole/Anubis
- Producer: Owen Bolwell, Aka Setkya

Tlot Tlot chronology
A Day at the Bay (1991)	Pistolbuttsa'twinkle (1992)	Old Mac (1992)

Pistolbuttsa'twinkle is the second album by Australian rock band Tlot Tlot. The album was released in 1992 and compiles eight remastered versions of cuts from the band's debut, A Day at the Bay, with previously unreleased songs from the sessions.

== Track listing ==
No.	Title	Length
1.	"48 Death Narcotic (Split Spoilt)"	3:52
2.	"Cancer"	1:47
3.	"Sunny Delirious"	3:44
4.	"Mother's Fluid"	1:57
5.	"Red Shoes"	3:36
6.	"Box o' Gods"	3:55
7.	"The Bonebass Suttee"	2:35
8.	"Once or Twice"	3:06
9.	"Beat the Children"	3:32
10.	"Bella"	2:21
11.	"Screaming Lovers"	3:37
12.	"Judas"	1:55
13.	"Dog"	3:08
14.	"Special Piece of Person"	2:05
15.	"Down Yonder Green Valley (Where Streamlets Meander)"	1:12

A music video was filmed for "Box o' Gods".

== Crew ==
- Stanley Paulzen - lead vocals, guitars
- Owen Bolwell - backing vocals, processed vocals, guitars, bass, drum programming, special effects, keyboards, lead vocals on track 13
- Aka Setkya - producer
- Greg Fields, Colin Mac - saxophones

== Pistolbuttsatwinkle'atwinkle ==
Pistolbuttsatwinklea'twinkle

Studio album by Tlot Tlot
- Released: 1993
- Recorded: Whirled Records, Melbourne, 1991
- Genre: Alternative rock
- Length: 59:10
- Label: Anubis

Tlot Tlot chronology
Old Mac (1992)	Pistolbuttsatwinklea'twinkle (1993)	The Live Set - Volume 1 (1993)

In 1993, shortly after Pistolbuttsa'twinkle was sold out and deleted, Tlot Tlot reissued the album as Pistolbuttsatwinkle'atwinkle, with new cover art and a re-ordered track list incorporating five tracks originally from Day at the Bay, but left off the original CD release.

=== Track listing ===
No.	Title	Length
1.	"Down Yonder Green Valley (Where Streamlets Meander)"	1:12
2.	"Sunny Delirious"	3:44
3.	"Cancer"	1:47
4.	"Box o' Gods"	3:55
5.	"Birthday"	3:33
6.	"Screaming Lovers"	3:37
7.	"Judas"	1:55
8.	"Marshall"	3:57
9.	"Red Shoes"	3:36
10.	"Bella"	2:21
11.	"Mother's Fluid"	1:57
12.	"Beat the Children"	3:32
13.	"Bus"	1:40
14.	"Victor"	3:31
15.	"Special Piece of Person"	2:05
16.	"The Bonebass Suttee"	2:35
17.	"Settle"	4:07
18.	"48 Death Narcotic (Split Spoilt)"	3:52
19.	"Once or Twice"	3:06
20.	"Dog"	3:08

== Legacy ==
The name of the track "Sunny Delirious" would, in the 2010s, be used as the name of Sunny Delirious Pty Ltd, the company owning the trademark to Merril Bainbridge's online maternity wear store Peachymama.

Tlot Tlot are the only known pop group to write a song - "The Bonebass Suttee“ on this album - about the practice of Sati.
