= Sleeping Dogs =

Sleeping Dogs or Sleeping Dogs Lie may refer to:

== Film ==
- Sleeping Dogs (1977 film), a New Zealand drama
- Sleeping Dogs (1997 film), a Canadian sci-fi film
- Sleeping Dogs Lie (1998 film), based on the true-life story of Ambrose Small
- Sleeping Dogs Lie (2005 film), a short film
- Sleeping Dogs Lie (2006 film), an American romantic black comedy
- Sleeping Dogs (2024 film), an American crime thriller film

== Literature ==
- Sleeping Dogs, a 1995 novel by Sonya Hartnett
- Sleeping Dogs, a 1990 novel by William Garner
- Sleeping Dogs, a 1992 novel by Thomas Perry

== Television ==
- Sleeping Dogs (TV series), a British late-night program 2000–2001
- "Sleeping Dogs" (Doctors), a 2002 episode
- "Sleeping Dogs" (Star Trek: Enterprise), a 2002 episode
- "Sleeping Dogs Lie" (House), a 2006 episode
- "Sleeping Dogs Lie" (Only Fools and Horses), a 1985 episode
- "Sleeping Dogs Lie", a 2004 episode of Third Watch

== Other uses ==
- Sleeping Dogs (video game), 2012
- "Sleeping Dogs", a song by Merril Bainbridge from the 1995 album The Garden
- "Sleeping Dogs", a song by Moka Only from the 2012 album Airport 6

== See also ==
- Let sleeping dogs lie, a proverb
- Let Sleeping Dogs Lie (disambiguation)
