= Power of two (disambiguation) =

A power of two is a number of the form 2^{n}, meaning 2 multiplied by itself n times.

Power of two or variations may also refer to:

- The Power of Two, a 2009 album by Michael Feinstein and Cheyenne Jackson
- "Power of Two" (song), a song by the Indigo Girls
- Power of 2 (book), a self-help book about partnerships by Rodd Wagner and Gale Muller
- "The Power of Two" (Charmed episode), an episode of the television series Charmed
- The Power of Two, the first book in the novel series Twitches by H. B. Gilmour and Randi Reisfeld
- Epic Mickey 2: The Power of Two, a 2012 video game produced by Junction Point Studios
- Max & Paddy's The Power of Two, a DVD release from the television show Max and Paddy's Road to Nowhere
- "Power of Two", a song from the television series The Acolyte
- Battle for Dream Island: The Power of Two, the fifth season of the animated web series Battle for Dream Island
