= Rain (Man in the Wood song) =

Single by Man in the Wood

from the album Thumper
- Released: 13 November 1989
- Recorded: 1988–1989, AVC Studios, Melbourne
- Genre: Alternative rock, post-punk
- Length: 3:23
- Label: self-released
- Songwriter(s): Bolwell/Paulzen
- Producer(s): Aka Setkya, Owen Bolwell, Stanley Paulzen and Malcolm Dennis

Man in the Wood singles chronology
"Rain" (1989)	"Old Mac" (1992)

Rain is a single by the Australian post-punk band Man in the Wood and one of only two releases under that name before the change to Tlot Tlot in 1991.

Unlike other Man in the Wood and Tlot Tlot releases, this single was not released on any label, however the catalogue number MAN 001 can be seen in the runout groove. On this release, drummer Stanley Paulzen is credited by his middle name of Jason.

== Track list ==
Both songs written and composed by Bolwell/Paulzen.

1. Rain (3:23)
2. Glamour and the Sand (2:52)

Segments of the track "Glamour and the Sand" were later used as an intro and outro to the EP Thumper, renamed "Samurai Glands".

== Crew ==
- Owen Bolwell - bass, lead vocals, artwork
- Andrew Briant - guitar
- Stanley Paulzen - drums, backing vocals
