= Mouth (Merril Bainbridge song) =

1994 single by Merril Bainbridge

- Artwork of the 1995 re-release

Single by Merril Bainbridge

from the album The Garden
- B-side: "Being Boring"; "Song for Neen"
- Released: 24 October 1994
- Studio: 001 (Carlton, Victoria)
- Length: 3:25
- Label: Gotham
- Songwriter: Merril Bainbridge
- Producer: Siew

Merril Bainbridge singles chronology
"Mouth" (1994)	"Under the Water" (1995)

Alternative cover
- US single cover

"Mouth" is a song written by Australian singer-songwriter Merril Bainbridge and produced by Siew for Bainbridge's debut album, The Garden (1995). It was released as the album's first single in October 1994 in Australia, then was re-issued in 1995. "Mouth" became her biggest hit, peaking at number one on the Australian ARIA Singles Chart for six consecutive weeks and in Canada for one week. The song also became a top-five hit in Iceland and the United States, where it peaked at number four on both the Billboard Hot 100 and Cash Box Top 100 charts. It also reached number 17 in New Zealand.

== Content ==
The song, a playful and suggestive tune, was often referred to having something related to sexual themes. Bainbridge stated that "(Any sexuality on "Mouth" was) not deliberate—it was definitely not a sexual song. It's just honest—about a relationship, how you feel in a relationship. Sometimes you feel you're in control and the next thing, you're insecure—it's the role playing thing. To me, it's not about straight up sexuality. It doesn't bother me if people connect with that, because obviously it's there, but it wasn't something I was aware of".

== Chart performance ==
The "Mouth" single was first released in Australia in October 1994 but disappeared quickly due to lack of interest and airplay, charting outside the top 100. The song was repackaged and reissued in 1995 and with the help of airplay and more promotion it became the biggest song of her career. The single belatedly entered the Australian ARIA top 100 in March 1995 at number 60, and during its ninth week on the chart, it reached the number-one position and stayed there for six consecutive weeks. By doing so, Bainbridge became the first Australian woman to top her native country's chart with a self-penned debut single. "Mouth" spent a total of 26 weeks in the charts, was the fourth-highest-selling single for 1995, and was accredited platinum by ARIA. The song was nominated for seven ARIA Awards in 1995 but failed to win any.

In the United States, "Mouth" debuted on the Billboard Hot 100 at number 67, eventually peaking at number four. It also peaked at number four on the US Cash Box Top 100 in the same period. Success in the American music industry was, and still is, a relatively rare occurrence for Australian artists and the success of "Mouth" in the US gave Bainbridge superstar status in her home country for a period. Ross Fraser stated that he thought she would have had more chance of success in Europe and what happened in the US came as a surprise. The song spent a total of thirty weeks in the US charts and was the 37th-highest-selling single for 1996. It was accredited gold by Recording Industry Association of America (RIAA), selling 600,000 copies in the US. After the success of the song, Bainbridge toured the US and during that tour she played at Madison Square Garden in New York City with Sheryl Crow. The song did not enjoy the same success in the UK, peaking at 51 in the charts during its eight-week run in the top 200. The song also entered the top five in Japan, Hong Kong and the Philippines.

== Music video ==
There were two music videos for the song, both directed by Gotham Records co-founder Ross Fraser. Both videos are simple videos with no plot. The first video was shot in both black and white and colour. Scenes included Bainbridge flirting with a long-haired man in a car and singing to the camera wearing a black lingerie dress with a red heart in the middle of it, intercut with shots of another man's mouth. This video was released in Australia. The second video consists of just the black-and-white footage of Bainbridge in the car kissing the first man for the whole video, looking at the camera three times. It was filmed along Yarra Boulevard in the Melbourne suburb of Kew. This video as well as the first, was released around the world. The first music video can be found on the special edition of The Garden as a CD-ROM.

== Track listings ==
- Australian CD and cassette single, UK CD single
1. "Mouth"
2. "Being Boring"
3. "Song for Neen"
4. "Mouth" (off the track mix)
- UK cassette single
1. "Mouth"
2. "Being Boring"
3. "Mouth" (off the track mix)
- European CD single
1. "Mouth"
2. "Being Boring"
- US CD and cassette single
1. "Mouth"
2. "Julie"
- US 12-inch single

A1. "Mouth" (conversion) – 7:17
A2. "Mouth" (subversion) – 3:54
B1. "Mouth" (diversion) – 5:39
B2. "Mouth" (inversion) – 3:54
B3. "Mouth" (perversion) – 3:57

== Charts ==
=== Weekly charts ===
Chart (1995–1997)	Peak position
Australia (ARIA)	1
Canada Top Singles (RPM)	1
Canada Adult Contemporary (RPM)	1
Germany (GfK)	71
Iceland (Íslenski Listinn Topp 40)	5
New Zealand (Recorded Music NZ)	17
Scottish Singles Sales (Official Charts)	53
UK Singles (Official Charts)	51
US Billboard Hot 100	4
US Adult Pop Airplay (Billboard)	8
US Pop Airplay (Billboard)	2
US Rhythmic Airplay (Billboard)	23
US Cash Box Top 100	4

=== Year-end charts ===
Chart (1995)	Position
Australia (ARIA)	4

Chart (1996)	Position
Canada Top Singles (RPM)	62
Canada Adult Contemporary (RPM)	43
US Billboard Hot 100	53
US Adult Top 40 (Billboard)	40
US Top 40/Mainstream (Billboard)	42

Chart (1997)	Position
Canada Top Singles (RPM)	40
Canada Adult Contemporary (RPM)	55
US Billboard Hot 100	42
US Top 40/Mainstream (Billboard)	37

== Certifications ==
Region	Certification	Certified units/sales
Australia (ARIA)	Platinum	70,000^{^}
United States (RIAA)	Gold	600,000
^{^} Shipments figures based on certification alone.

== Release history ==
Region	Date	Format(s)	Label(s)	Catalogue	Ref.
Australia	24 October 1994	CD	Gotham	74321236412	
Australia	24 October 1994	Cassette	Gotham	74321236414	
Japan	21 February 1996	CD	Gotham; BMG	BVCP-8822	
United States	12 August 1996	Top 40 radio	Universal	—N/a	
United Kingdom	25 November 1996	CD	Arista; Gotham; BMG	74321431012	
United Kingdom	25 November 1996	Cassette	Arista; Gotham; BMG	74321431014	
