= The Girlfriend Song =

Single by Tlot Tlot
- B-side: In the Summertime; Stink; Sunny Delirious (live)
- Released: 27 February 1995
- Recorded: 1993
- Genre: Alternative rock
- Length: 3:40
- Label: EMI
- Songwriter(s): Owen Bolwell, Stanley Paulzen
- Producer(s): Siew, Tlot Tlot

Tlot Tlot singles chronology
| "Old Mac" (1992) | "The Girlfriend Song" (1995) |

"The Girlfriend Song" is the second and final single by the Australian rock band Tlot Tlot. The single was released in 1995.

At the ARIA Music Awards of 1995, the song was nominated for Best Pop Release.

== Composition ==
The song is a mid-tempo pop rock song. Its lyrics are about the singer's girlfriend. The chord progression is F-A#-D#-A#.

== Music video ==
The video is set in a white room and begins with a shot of some cables and effects pedals, before cutting to Paulzen singing the intro and playing guitar. Bolwell then starts singing while a crazed woman tries to hug him. In some shots, Bolwell can be seen wearing a hammer and sickle shirt. The end of the video shows Bolwell and Paulzen jumping around, with Bolwell holding a guitar.

== Track listing ==
All tracks are written by O.Bolwell and S.Paulzen except track 2 by Ray Dorset

| No. | Title | Length |
|---|---|---|
| 1. | "The Girlfriend Song" | 3:40 |
| 2. | "In the Summertime" | 2:20 |
| 3. | "Stink" | 2:44 |
| 4. | "Sunny Delirious" (live) | 3:38 |

Track 2 was previously released on the album Fashion Takes a Holiday.

== Personnel ==
- Stanley Paulzen - guitars, drums, lead vocals (track4)
- Owen Bolwell - bass, keyboards, lead vocals (tracks 1–3), megaphone (track 2), CD machine operator (track 4)
- George Siew Ooi - producer

== Charts ==
Chart performance for "The Girlfriend Song"
| Chart (1995) | Peak position |
|---|---|
| Australia (ARIA) | 73 |
