= Fashion Takes a Holiday =

Studio album by Tlot Tlot
- Released: July 1994
- Recorded: 1993
- Studio: Studio 001, Carlton
- Genre: Alternative rock
- Length: 32:03
- Label: Manhole

Tlot Tlot chronology
The Live Set - Volume 1 (1993)	Fashion Takes a Holiday (1994)

Fashion Takes a Holiday is the fourth and final studio album by the Australian rock band Tlot Tlot and their only covers album. It was released in 1994.

== Track list ==
No.	Title	Length
1.	"What I Like About You"	3:09
2.	"Don't Take Your Guns to Town"	3:25
3.	"Computer Games"	3:32
4.	"In the Summertime"	2:19
5.	"Button Up Your Overcoat"	2:33
6.	"Porcupine Pie"	2:23
7.	"Running Bear"	3:25
8.	"Can Your Pussy Do the Dog?"	2:28
9.	"Johnny Get Angry"	2:46
10.	"Just Can't Get Enough"	3:44
11.	Untitled (Unlisted credits track)	2:29

The band covered "Just Can't Get Enough" on their live album The Live Set - Volume 1 two years earlier - the recording from that album is included on this album.

As well as the tracks listed here, at least two more tracks, "The Girlfriend Song" and "Stink", were recorded in the sessions. "The Girlfriend Song" was released as a stand-alone single in 1995 with "In the Summertime" and "Stink" as B-sides.
