= Power of One (song) =

1995 single by Merril Bainbridge

Single by Merril Bainbridge

from the album The Garden
- B-side: "Reasons Why" (demo)
- Released: 16 October 1996
- Studio: 001 (Carlton, Victoria)
- Length: 4:08
- Label: Gotham
- Songwriter: Merril Bainbridge
- Producer: Siew

Merril Bainbridge singles chronology
| "Under the Water" (1995) | "Power of One" (1996) | "Sleeping Dogs" (1996) |

"Power of One" is a song written by Australian singer-songwriter Merril Bainbridge and produced by Siew for Bainbridge's debut album, The Garden (1995). It was released as the album's third single in October 1995. The song peaked at number 21 on the Australian ARIA Singles Chart, spending seven weeks in the top 50.

== Track listing ==
1. "Power of One" (single mix) – 4:14
2. "Power of One" (album mix) – 4:06
3. "Reasons Why" (demo) – 2:58

== Charts ==
| Chart (1995) | Peak position |
|---|---|
| Australia (ARIA) | 21 |
