= Between the Days =

Studio album by Merril Bainbridge
- Released: 5 October 1998
- Recorded: 1997–1998
- Genre: Alternative pop
- Length: 47:49
- Label: Gotham, Universal
- Producer: Siew

Merril Bainbridge chronology
The Garden (1995)	Between the Days (1998)

Singles from Between the Days
- 1. "Lonely" Released: 30 March 1998; 2. "I Got U Babe" Released: 31 August 1998; 3. "Between the Days" Released: 22 November 1998; 4. "Walk on Fire" Released: 29 June 1999

Between the Days is the second and to-date final studio album by Australian singer Merril Bainbridge, released in Australia on 5 October 1998 (see 1998 in music) by Gotham Records. Bainbridge co-wrote most of the album with Owen Bolwell, who also produced the album with Siew and Sam Melamed. The album is a mix between alternative pop songs and features a cover of the Sonny & Cher song "I Got You Babe", sung with the Jamaican rapper Shaggy. The album produced Bainbridge's fifth top forty single on the ARIA Charts, and another top one hundred single.

Bainbridge started writing again when she was completing her first international tour. She states that title of the album "refers to a place I found myself when I was working on this album. I went through a period where I was very much secluded, and my only distractions were my vivid dreams which became a form of escapism". The album has the same sort of sound of her first album The Garden, but is more mature and centred.

== Reception ==
Professional ratings
Review scores
Source	Rating
Allmusic	4/5 stars
IDS	2/5 stars

The album debuted on the Australian Albums Chart on 12 October 1998 at number fifty-eight, not as successful as The Garden which debuted at number five. It then dropped thirty-seven places to ninety-five. The album spent its last week in the chart at number ninety-four with a total of five weeks in the charts. In the U.S. the album was released six months after "Lonely" and did not have much promotion so it failed to chart on the Billboard 200.

The singles released from Between the Days were unsuccessful in most music markets. "Lonely" was the first song released from the album and was not a huge hit only peaking at number forty in Australia but was quite successful in Japan where it peaked at number twenty-five. "Lonely" was Bainbridge's third song eligible to chart in the U.S. but failed to crack the Billboard Hot 100 where it peaked at number eighteen on the Bubbling Under Hot 100 Singles Chart. "I Got You Babe", the second song released and a cover of a Sonny & Cher song, was not her most successful song, only peaking at number sixty-two in Australia. "Between the Days" and "Walk on Fire" were also released as singles but failed to chart.

== Track listing ==
1. "Between the Days" (Bainbridge, Owen Bolwell) – 3:40
2. "Lonely" (Bainbridge, Bolwell) – 3:34
3. "Goodbye to Day" (Bainbridge) – 4:04
4. "Stars Collide" (Bainbridge, Bolwell) – 4:19
5. "Walk on Fire" (Bainbridge, Bolwell) – 3:57
6. "Hello" (Bainbridge, Bolwell) – 4:02
7. "Blindfolded" (Bainbridge, Bolwell) – 4:38
8. "Love and Terror" (Bainbridge, Bolwell) – 3:54
9. "Call My Name" (Bainbridge, Bolwell) – 4:48
10. "Big Machine" (Bainbridge, Bolwell) – 4:10

=== Australian edition ===
11. "I Got U Babe" (Sonny Bono) – 3:22 - hidden track, only mentioned on hype sticker

== Personnel ==
- Aaronski – studio assistant
- Elvis Aljus – percussion (track 9)
- Merril Bainbridge – background vocals (tracks 1–3, 5–11)
- Alastair Barden – drums (tracks 7 and 9)
- Mark Domoney – acoustic guitar (tracks 2, 4, 9, 10)
- Karen Eden – background vocals (track 4)
- Tony Espie – mixing (tracks 1–11)
- Daniela Federici – photography
- Stuart Fraser – guitar (track 7)
- Dion Hirini – acoustic guitar (track 7)
- Mark Ingram – engineer (tracks 1–11)
- Warren Jenkins – bass (tracks 1, 4, 5, 7–10)
- Anne McCue – acoustic guitar (tracks 5 and 7)
- Roger McLachlan – bass (tracks 2 and 6)
- Greg O'Connor – artwork
- Alex Pertout – percussion (track 4)
- Siew – producer (tracks 1–11)
- Gota Yashiki – percussion (track 5), loops (tracks 3 and 8)
- Leon Zervos – mastering

=== Japan edition ===
11. "I Got You Babe" – 3:22
12. "Lonely" (acoustic version) – 2:19

== Singles ==
Release date	Information	Track listing
30 March 1998	"Lonely"; The first single from Between the Days was released on 30 March 1998, and was the very first music release to be released by Bainbridge in two years. The song is a bubblegum pop song written by Bainbridge and Owen Bolwell, and produced by Siew and samples the lyrics from the nursery rhyme "Georgie Porgie". Bainbridge states the song is about relationships in the 1990s, she explains "Women are really testing their boundaries and exploring their sexuality. It's a very different time. Roles are still undefined and quite confusing. Women are reluctant to be aggressive because they are afraid they are going to wind up alone. Basically, it takes courage to explore yourself." The single peaked at number forty on the Australian ARIA Singles Chart and number eighteen on the U.S. Billboard Bubbling Under Hot 100 Singles chart.	1. "Lonely" (radio edit) – 3:36; 2. "Lonely" (alternate mix) – 3:31; 3. "Lonely" (acoustic version) – 2:19
31 August 1998	"I Got U Babe"; The second single from Between the Days and a cover version of the 1965 Sonny & Cher song. Bainbridge's version has a pop reggae feel to it and features Jamaican rapper Shaggy. Released on 31 August 1998, the song was featured in the film Welcome to Woop Woop and was also included on the film's soundtrack. The music video was directed by David Dobkin and features Bainbridge and Shaggy singing in front of a western themed backdrop in a red car, and also features snippets of the film Welcome to Woop Woop. The single peaked at number sixty-two on the Australian ARIA Singles Chart – the last song of Bainbridge's to ever chart.	1. "I Got U Babe" (radio edit); 2. "I Got U Babe" (Rasta Man Ting mix); 3. "I Got U Babe" (Wazza Man Ting mix); 4. "If You Leave"
22 November 1998	"Between the Days"; The third single from Between the Days was released on 22 November 1998 and was written by Bainbridge with Owen Bolwell, and produced by Siew. The music video was directed by Mark Hartley and features a reincarnation of the 1970s Australian music television show Countdown with Ian "Molly" Meldrum presenting Bainbridge and the album at the beginning of the video, then Bainbridge performing the song in front of the audience. The single failed to chart on the Australian ARIA Singles Chart.	1. "Between the Days" (radio edit) – 3:42; 2. "Between the Days" (Phil Spectacular mix) – 3:30; 3. "Between the Days" (The B's Kneez mix) – 6:55; 4. "Between the Days" (TJ Hooker mix) – 7:47; 5. "Between the Days" (Chrome-O-Stone mix) – 5:42
29 June 1999	"Walk on Fire"; The fourth and final single from Between the Days was released on 29 June 1999 and was also written by Bainbridge with Owen Bolwell, and produced by Siew. The music video was directed by Mark Hartley and was recorded in black and white and features Bainbridge driving in a car and it breaks down many times. The single also failed to chart on the Australian ARIA Singles Chart.	1. "Walk on Fire" (single mix); 2. "Walk on Fire" (album version); 3. "Walk on Fire" (groove mix); 4. "Walk on Fire" (instrumental); 5. "Walk on Fire" (ambient mix)

== Charts ==
Chart (1998)	Peak position
Australian ARIA Albums Chart	58

== Release history ==
Country	Date	Label	Format	Catalog
Australia	5 October 1998	Gotham Records	CD	GOTH98062
Japan	24 February 1999	Gotham	CD	BVCP-21036
