= Power of 2 (book) =

Power of 2: How to Make the Most of Your Partnerships at Work and in Life
- Author: Rodd Wagner & Gale Muller, Ph.D
- Language: English
- Subject: Partnerships, collaboration, human nature
- Genre: Nonfiction
- Publisher: Gallup Press
- Publication date: November 2009
- Publication place: United States
- Media type: Print, Hardcover
- Pages: 243
- ISBN: 978-1-59562-029-3

Power of 2 is a book written by bestselling author Rodd Wagner and Gallup World Poll leader Dr. Gale Muller. It describes the authors’ five years of research on collaboration and partnerships. The book is a mixture of advice to the reader, stories of prominent partnerships, and discoveries from various disciplines such as primatology, neuroscience, game theory, and behavioral economics.

== Content ==
Power of 2 is organized into eight main chapters, each detailing one of the elements of partnership identified by the authors’ research. The eight elements are complementary strengths, a common mission, fairness, trust, acceptance, forgiveness, communicating, and unselfishness.

These elements are illustrated through short stories about famous partnerships such as those between Karl Malone and John Stockton, Bill Hewlett and David Packard, John Adams and Thomas Jefferson, and James Watson and Francis Crick.

Power of 2 is one of several books – along with bestsellers Now, Discover Your Strengths and StrengthsFinder 2.0 – based on Gallup’s evidence that people flourish best when using their inherent talents. After summarizing studies indicating people generally overestimate their abilities where they are weak and underestimate them when they are strong, the authors advise: “So admit it: You stink at some things. You have blind spots, weaknesses, areas in which others seem to perform effortlessly while you struggle just to be average. You are also overly modest about your strengths. What seems to be no big deal to you is difficult for others. Your strengths are stronger and your weaknesses weaker than you realize. You need help. You are also precisely the help someone else needs.” This incompleteness of the individual, they argue, is one of the primary reasons for partnerships.

The trust chapter of the book makes use of the numerous studies of the prisoner’s dilemma (what Wagner and Muller prefer to call “the partner’s dilemma”). Although the classic form of the famous trust game gives more incentives to defect than to cooperate, Power of 2 derives lessons from Robert Axelrod’s computer tournaments showing that the optimal strategy is to start friendly, then reciprocate what the other person does. A wise collaborator is simultaneously eager to cooperate, but willing to stand up for himself, they conclude.

The chapter on unselfishness tells the story of the partnership between John Lennon and Paul McCartney, Daniel Kahneman and Amos Tversky, two of the fathers of behavioral economics and highly successful collaborators themselves until Tversky's untimely death from skin cancer.

Power of 2 includes two supplemental chapters for managers and business leaders. Managers who are perceived as being more “partner” than “boss” have substantially more engaged workgroups, according to the book. The authors caution executives that many companies that claim to want collaboration between groups in fact create incentives for two groups to compete with each other.
