= Junkyard Choir =

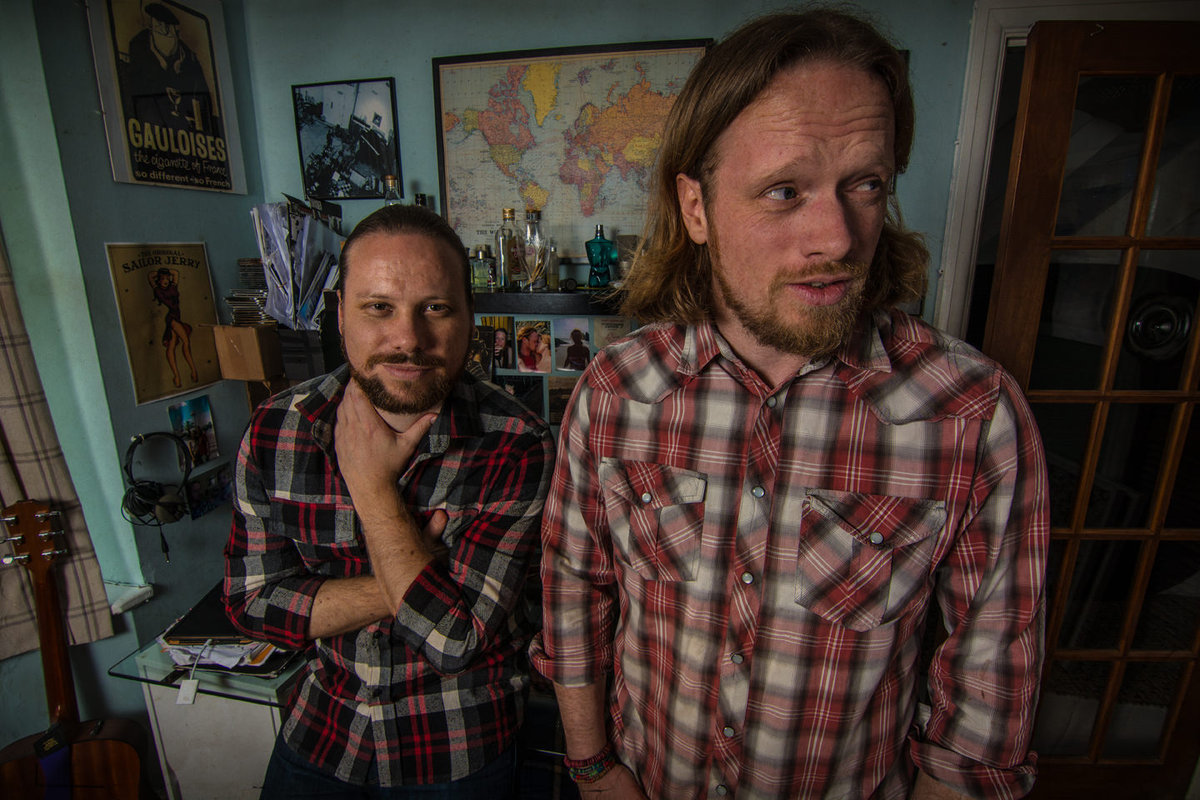
- Junkyard Choir

Background information
- Origin: Brighton, England, UK
- Genres: Alternative Rock / Blues / Grunge / Soul
- Years active: 2014 - present
- Labels: Kingdom Of Dirt
- Members: Mark Woods; Jackie Taylor; Bob Ainsworth; Matt Ainsworth; Joe Flynn
- Website: www.junkyardchoir.com

Junkyard Choir are a five-piece English, Croydon-based rock band. Since its founding, the band has undergone several alterations. The band's sound has its origins in blues rock, soul, garage rock, roots, grunge and punk and has been described as "mean, merciless, hard rollin’ blues rock performed with hammering power and captivating intensity".

== Background ==
The original line up formed sometime around 2006. After releasing a few EP's Junkyard Choir then morphed into a duo of Mark Woods (Vocals, Guitar) and Tom Herbert (Drums, Vocals) performing under the pseudonym ‘Dos Hermanos Locos’ during late 2013 and early 2014 – self-releasing two EPs – before resurrecting the ‘Junkyard Choir’ band name in the summer of 2014.

Junkyard Choir's first single "Get It On" was released in March 2015 and was featured in the 20th issue of Classic Rock's 'The Blues Magazine' later that month. Junkyard Choir's debut album Let Sleeping Dogs Lie was self-released on 24 April 2015.

Junkyard Choir's second album Trouble in Mind was released on 26 January 2018 after a successful crowd sourcing operation which provided funding for the release.

In late 2018, the band became an eight piece for a short time with the addition of three backing singers, saxophone, bass and organ and three revolving drummers. The band will release Wild Ones Never Die on 24 February 2023 at an official album launch event at https://www.thesoundlounge.org.uk/.

== Discography ==
=== Albums ===
Title	Album details
Let Sleeping Dogs Lie	Released: 24 April 2015; Label: Self-released; Format: CD, digital download
Trouble in Mind	Released: 26 January 2018; Label: Kingdom of Dirt Records; Format: CD, digital download
Wild Ones Never Die	Released: 24 February 2023; Label: Kingdom of Dirt Records; Format: Vinyl LP, CD, digital download

=== Singles / EPs ===
Title	Single / EP details
"Someone" / "The Border"	Released: 6 July 2017; Label: Self-released; Format: Digital download
