= Merril Bainbridge =

Australian musician

- Born: 2 June 1968 (age 58); Melbourne, Victoria, Australia
- Genres: Pop
- Occupation: Singer-songwriter
- Instrument: Vocals
- Years active: 1984—present
- Labels: Gotham, Universal
- Website: merrilbainbridge.com

Merril Bainbridge (born 2 June 1968) is an Australian pop music singer and songwriter. Her debut was in 1994 with the single, "Mouth", which peaked at number one for six consecutive weeks in Australia and became a top five hit in the United States.

== Early career ==
Merril Bainbridge started performing at the age of nine. Her first performance was at a carnival that her sisters persuaded her to enter because the prize was free carnival tickets. She came third and won twenty dollars' worth of tickets. After six years of performing in a variety of bands in Australia, and doing backup vocal work in exchange for studio time, Bainbridge began a solo career under the tutelage of producer Siew. Bainbridge stated that she and Siew "really connected well, from a creative point. I liked the way he worked and I knew I had so much more to learn in that environment [and] that's how it started. That was the point where I started feeling a lot more confident as a singer and then wanting to dive more into the songwriting side." She also worked a day job before quitting to concentrate solely on music.

In 1991, she and Siew wrote the track "Could This Be Love" for the Techno-Color single "Unchained Melody".

== Music career ==
=== The Garden: 1994–1997 ===
In 1994, Bainbridge was signed to Ross Fraser and John Farnham's newly formed Gotham Records label. Fraser first heard Bainbridge when he received a tape in the mail and was interested by the combination of voice and guitar. "Mouth" was Bainbridge's debut release and the first song released from her debut album The Garden by Gotham Records. "Mouth" was released in Australia in October 1994 but was lost in the Christmas shuffle. It was reissued in February 1995 where it came to be the biggest song of Bainbridge's career, peaking at number one in Australia for six consecutive weeks before becoming the fourth highest selling single in Australia for 1995. The second song released from The Garden was "Under the Water" which is a song about a lover who drowned, released in Australia in June 1995. The song did not match the success of "Mouth" but was still a top five hit, peaking at number four in Australia and accrediting platinum by ARIA. The Garden was released in Australia on 31 July 1995, where it debuted at its peak position at number five on the Australian ARIA Albums Chart and certifying two times platinum selling 140,000 copies around Australia. In October 1995 the third song off the album was released titled "Power of One" which was not as big but still charted in Australia at number twenty-one. The ninth annual ARIA Awards saw Bainbridge nominated for seven awards but she failed to win any. The fourth and final single "Sleeping Dogs" was released in Australia in February 1996 and featured the Bee Gees song "I Started a Joke" which was used for the bridge of the track. The song only peaked at number fifty-five in Australia.

Marc Nathan signed Bainbridge to the Universal Music record label in the United States by 1996. "Mouth" was released in the United States on 20 August 1996 and became the most requested song on American radio for three weeks. The song debuted on the Billboard Hot 100 at number sixty-seven and after twelve weeks, the song peaked at number four. It spent a total of thirty weeks in the charts selling 600,000 copies and earning a gold single. The Garden was released on 24 September 1996 and debuted on the Billboard 200 at number one hundred and sixty-one. After six weeks just missing the top one hundred it peaked at the position of one hundred and one. "Mouth" was Bainbridge's only release in the United Kingdom. It was released in November 1996 but did not show great success peaking at number fifty-one and spending eight weeks in the top two hundred. At the end of 1996 Bainbridge toured thirty cities in the U.S. for forty days and she presented an award at the Billboard Awards. She also performed at Madison Square Garden supporting American singer Sheryl Crow. "Under the Water" was released in the United States on 18 February 1997 and debuted at number seven on the Billboard Bubbling Under Hot 100 chart. After two weeks it broke into the Billboard Hot 100 at number ninety-seven. It took the song four weeks to reach its peak position of number ninety-one before it fell out of the chart from then on, spending six weeks in the Hot 100.

=== Between the Days: 1998–1999 ===
While Bainbridge was completing her first international tour, she started writing the album Between the Days which she refers to it being a place she found herself when she was working on the album. The first single released from the album was "Lonely" which received wide radio airplay on FOX FM upon its release but only managed a peak at forty in Australia, number eighteen on the Billboard Bubbling Under Hot 100 chart and number twenty-five in Japan. Later that year, she released a cover of "I Got You Babe" featuring a small contribution from Shaggy (which appeared on the soundtrack for the movie Welcome to Woop Woop). Two more songs were released from the album - "Between the Days" and "Walk on Fire".

In 1999 Bainbridge participated in John Farnham's "I Can't Believe He's 50" tour with Kate Ceberano, Ross Wilson, James Reyne, Human Nature, and Nana-Zhami. She covered Farnham's tracks "Burn for You" and "Raindrops Keep Fallin' on My Head".

In 1999 Merril Bainbridge recorded "Sydney from a 747", a song written and previously recorded by fellow Australian Paul Kelly. The track appeared on the soundtrack of the IMAX film Sydney - A Story of a City and was released as part of an official music compilation for the Sydney 2000 Olympic games entitled "Olympic Record" (WEA Australia, 2000). This album is currently out of print.

=== 2000s ===
In 2000, Bainbridge recorded a song named "Friends" for the Australian film The Magic Pudding which is featured on its soundtrack.

In 2003 the song "Girl Next Door" was released and an untitled album produced which remains unreleased. The album was due out in 2004, but then she realised that the tour would separate her from her family and left the music business.

=== Post music career ===
In 2011, Bainbridge founded maternity fashion brand Peachymama. Bainbridge left the company in February 2022 after the company's acquisition by equity investors.

== Discography ==
=== Albums ===
Title	Album details	Peak chart positions			Certifications (sales thresholds)
Title	Album details	AUS	NZ	US	Certifications (sales thresholds)
The Garden	Released: 31 July 1995; Label: Gotham	5	34	101	ARIA: 2× Platinum
Between the Days	Released: 5 October 1998; Label: Gotham	58	—	—	

=== Singles ===
Title	Year	Peak positions						Certifications	Album
Title	Year	AUS	GER	JPN	NZ	UK	US	Certifications	Album
"Mouth"	1994	1	71	—	17	51	4	ARIA: Platinum; RIAA: Gold	The Garden
"Under the Water"	1995	4	—	—	—	—	91	ARIA: Platinum	The Garden
"Power of One"	1995	21	—	—	—	—	—		The Garden
"Sleeping Dogs"	1996	55	—	—	—	—	—		The Garden
"Lonely"	1998	40	—	25	—	—	— (Note: "Lonely" did not chart on the Billboard Hot 100, but peaked at number 18 on the Bubbling Under Hot 100 Singles chart. The "bubbling under" chart only represents the twenty-five singles below the Hot 100's number 100 position which have not yet appeared on the Hot 100.)		Between the Days
"I Got U Babe" (featuring Shaggy)	1998	62	—	—	—	—	—		Between the Days
"Between the Days"	1998	173	—	—	—	—	—		Between the Days
"Walk on Fire"	1999	—	—	—	—	—	—		Between the Days
"Girl Next Door"	2003	105	—	—	—	—	—		Non-album single
"—" denotes singles that did not chart or were not released in that country.

=== Miscellaneous ===
- "2000 Miles" (1995) – a Christmas song written by Chrissie Hynde, and recorded for the compilation The Spirit of Christmas 1995.
- "Sydney from a 747" (1999) – a song on the soundtrack of the IMAX movie "Sydney – Story of a City" (1999) and included on "Olympic Record" (2000) the Sydney Olympic games official album.
- "Friends" (2000) – a song from the soundtrack to the Australian animation The Magic Pudding.

== Awards and nominations ==
=== ARIA Awards ===
Year	Award	Work	Result	Reference
1995	Best Pop Release	"Mouth"	Nominated	
1995	Breakthrough Artist – Single	"Mouth"	Nominated	
1995	Best New Talent	"Mouth"	Nominated	
1995	Best Female Artist	"Mouth"	Nominated	
1995	Single of the Year	"Mouth"	Nominated	
1995	Song of the Year	"Mouth"	Nominated	
1995	Highest Selling Single	"Mouth"	Nominated	
1996	Breakthrough Artist – Album	The Garden	Nominated	
1996	Highest Selling Album	The Garden	Nominated	
1996	Highest Selling Single	"Under the Water"	Nominated	

=== APRA Awards ===
Year	Award	Work	Result
1995	Song of the Year	"Mouth"	Nominated
1996	Most Performed Australian Work	"Under the Water"	Won
1999	Most Performed Australian Work	"Lonely"	Nominated

=== Notes ===
"Lonely" did not chart on the Billboard Hot 100, but peaked at number 18 on the Bubbling Under Hot 100 Singles chart. The "bubbling under" chart only represents the twenty-five singles below the Hot 100's number 100 position which have not yet appeared on the Hot 100.

== See also ==
- List of artists who reached number one on the Australian singles chart
