= The Garden (Merril Bainbridge album) =

Studio album by Merril Bainbridge
- Released: 31 July 1995
- Studios: 001 Studios, Carlton, Victoria, Australia
- Genre: Pop
- Length: 46:36
- Labels: Gotham, Universal Music
- Producers: George Siew Ooi, Owen Bolwell

Merril Bainbridge chronology
The Garden (1995)	Between the Days (1998)

Singles from The Garden
- 1. "Mouth" Released: November 1994; 2. "Under the Water" Released: July 1995; 3. "Power of One" Released: October 1995; 4. "Sleeping Dogs" Released: February 1996

Professional ratings
Review scores
Source	Rating
AllMusic	4/5 stars

The Garden is the first album by Australian singer Merril Bainbridge, released in Australia on 31 July 1995 by Gotham Records. The album has a main genre of alternative pop songs—some written by Bainbridge herself, Owen Bolwell, Stan Paulzen (both of Tlot Tlot) and Siew. The Garden debuted inside the top ten on the Australian ARIA Albums Chart and is her highest selling album to date, being certified double platinum by ARIA. The album nominated Bainbridge for eight awards throughout the 1995 and the 1996 ARIA Awards including; "Best Pop Release", "Breakthrough Artist – Single", "Best New Talent", "Best Female Artist", "Single of the Year", "Breakthrough Artist – Album", "Highest Selling Single" and "Highest Selling Album".

== Commercial performance and singles ==
The Garden was commercially successful in Australia and had minor success in New Zealand and the United States. In mid-August 1995, it debuted at number five on the Australian ARIA Albums Chart. The album dropped off the chart after five months, spending a total of twenty-two weeks on the chart. The Australian Recording Industry Association awarded the album a double platinum certification for shipping 140,000 copies and became the twenty-seventh highest selling album in Australia for 1995. At the 1996 ARIA Awards, the album was nominated for "Breakthrough Artist – Album" and "Highest Selling Album", but lost to Tu-Plang by Regurgitator and Don't Ask by Tina Arena respectively. In New Zealand, The Garden debuted at number thirty-four and spent two weeks on the chart.

"Mouth", the first single, became Bainbridge's most-successful single release, peaking at number-one on the Australian ARIA Singles Chart and top five on the US Billboard Hot 100. Written by Bainbridge herself, it is a bubblegum pop song about relationship—"sometimes you feel you're in control and the next thing, you're insecure." The single was released in October 1994 and failed to chart. When it was re-issued in 1995 it gained success, being certified platinum by ARIA and becoming the fourth highest selling single in Australia for 1995. The song was nominated for "Best Pop Release", "Breakthrough Artist – Single" and "Single of the Year" at the 1995 ARIA Awards. The second single "Under the Water" was written by Owen Bolwell and Stanley Paulzen in 1990. It became Bainbridge's second top ten hit in Australia. The song was nominated for "Highest Selling Single" at the 1996 ARIA Awards, but lost to "Let's Groove" by CDB. The third and fourth singles, "Power of One" and "Sleeping Dogs", had minor success on the chart peaking at number twenty-one and fifty-five respectively.

== Track listing ==
All tracks are written by Merril Bainbridge, except where noted.

Standard edition
No.	Title	Writer(s)	Length
1.	"Garden in My Room"		4:32
2.	"Under the Water"	Bainbridge; Owen Bolwell; Stanley Paulzen	4:13
3.	"Miss You"		3:03
4.	"Mouth"		3:25
5.	"Julie"		3:56
6.	"Song for Neen"		2:40
7.	"Sleeping Dogs"	Bainbridge; Bee Gees	3:28
8.	"Reasons Why"		2:57
9.	"Spinning"	Bainbridge; Bolwell	4:09
10.	"Being Boring"	Chris Lowe; Neil Tennant	3:51
11.	"State of Mind"	Bainbridge; George Siew Ooi	5:01
12.	"Power of One"		4:08
13.	"Garden in My Room" (reprise)		1:13

In late 1996, the album was re-released in Australia with a bonus disc containing several music videos and three remixes.

Australian reissue
No.	Title	Length
1.	"CD-ROM data"	19:00
2.	"Mouth" (Aversion mix)	4:01
3.	"Mouth" (Diversion mix)	5:39
4.	"Mouth" (Conversion mix)	7:15

Australian reissue (CD-ROM video content)
No.	Title	Length
1.	"Mouth"	3:30
2.	"Mouth" (version 2)	3:32
3.	"Garden in My Room"	4:27
4.	"Sleeping Dogs"	3:32
5.	"Under the Water"	3:50
6.	"Power of One"	4:14

== Personnel ==
- Merril Bainbridge – background vocals, vocal arrangement
- Owen Bolwell – electric guitar, keyboards, programming, producer, engineer
- Angus Burchall – percussion, drums
- Jason Catherine – vocal percussion (track 4)
- Gary Costello – double bass (track 3)
- Mark Domoney – acoustic guitar
- Tony Espie – mixing (tracks 1, 2, 5, 7, 9 and 11)
- Ross Fraser – mixing (tracks 4 and 12)
- Aaron Humphries – assistant engineer
- Chong Lim – piano (tracks 6 and 12)
- Michael Losin – violin (tracks 8 and 11)
- Brian Marsh – engineer
- Roger McLachlan – bass
- Sam Melamed – electric guitar, keyboards, programming, producer, engineer, mixing
- Greg O'Connor – graphic design
- Steve O'Hara – strings (tracks 1 and 5)
- Adrienne Overall – photography
- Siew – keyboards, programming, producer.
- Mark Wallace – accordion (track 1)
- Chris Wilson – harmonica, vocals (track 2)

== Charts ==
=== Weekly charts ===
Weekly chart performance for The Garden
Chart (1995)	Peak position
Australian ARIA Albums Chart	5
Chart (1996)	Peak position
Canada Top Albums/CDs (RPM)	74
New Zealand RIANZ Albums Chart	34
US Billboard 200	101
US Billboard Top Heatseekers	1

=== Year-end charts ===
Year-end chart performance for The Garden
Chart (1995)	Position
Australian ARIA Albums Chart	27

== Certifications ==
Certifications for The Garden
Region	Certification	Certified units/sales
Australia (ARIA)	2× Platinum	140,000^{^}
^{^} Shipments figures based on certification alone.

== Release history ==
Release history and formats for The Garden
Region	Date	Label	Format	Catalogue
Australia	31 July 1995	Gotham Records	CD, cassette	GOTH95032
Japan	21 February 1996	BMG Japan	CD	BVCP-914
New Zealand	24 March 1996	—	CD	—
United States	24 September 1996	Universal Records	CD	53019
