= ARIA Award for Best New Talent =

Former Australian music award

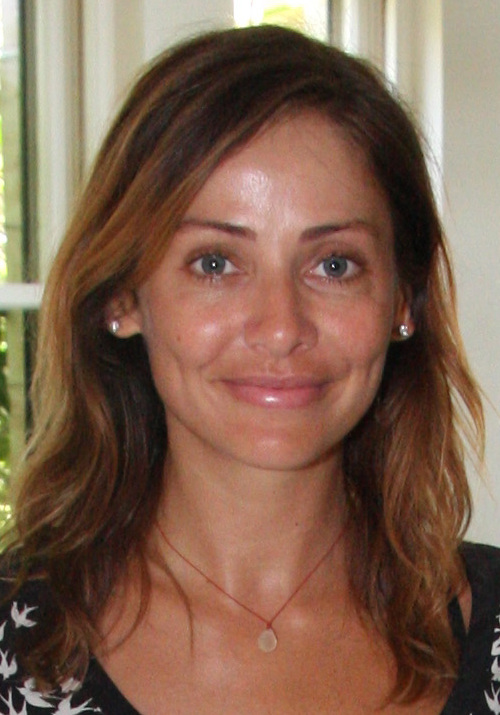
- 1998 winner Natalie Imbruglia
- Country: Australia
- Presented by: Australian Recording Industry Association (ARIA)
- First award: 1987
- Final award: 1998
- Currently held by: Natalie Imbruglia, Left of the Middle (1998)
- Website: ariaawards.com.au

The ARIA Music Award for Best New Talent was an award presented at the annual ARIA Music Awards. It was presented from 1987 through to 1998.

The award for Best New Talent was first presented in 1987. Crowded House won the award with their single "Don't Dream It's Over". It was retired after the 1998 awards with Natalie Imbruglia winning the final award for her album Left of the Middle.

== Winners and nominees ==
In the following table, the winner is highlighted in a separate colour, and in boldface; the nominees are those that are not highlighted or in boldface.

Winner marked in a separate colour

Year	Winner(s)	Album/single title
**1987** (1st)
**1987** (1st)	**Crowded House**	**"Don't Dream It's Over"**
**1987** (1st)	Big Pig	"Hungry Town"
**1987** (1st)	Boom Crash Opera	"Great Wall", "Hands Up in the Air"
**1987** (1st)	Ups and Downs	"The Living Kind"
**1987** (1st)	Wa Wa Nee	"Stimulation"
**1988** (2nd)
**1988** (2nd)	**Weddings Parties Anything**	**Scorn of the Women**
**1988** (2nd)	Dave Dobbyn	—N/a
**1988** (2nd)	James Reyne	—N/a
**1988** (2nd)	Lime Spiders	—N/a
**1988** (2nd)	Painters and Dockers	—N/a
**1989** (3rd)
**1989** (3rd)	**Johnny Diesel & The Injectors**	**"Don't Need Love"**
**1989** (3rd)	Died Pretty	Lost
**1989** (3rd)	Go 101	"Build It Up"
**1989** (3rd)	Roaring Jack	The Cat Among the Pigeons
**1989** (3rd)	The State	"Real Love"
**1990** (4th)
**1990** (4th)	**Gyan**	**Gyan**
**1990** (4th)	The Hummingbirds	loveBUZZ
**1990** (4th)	Martha's Vineyard	Martha's Vineyard
**1990** (4th)	Tall Tales and True	Shiver
**1990** (4th)	Tania Bowra	Heaven and Earth
**1991** (5th)
**1991** (5th)	**Archie Roach**	**Charcoal Lane**
**1991** (5th)	Doug Anthony Allstars	Icon
**1991** (5th)	Sea Stories	Miller's Pond
**1991** (5th)	Mary-Jo Starr	Too Many Movies
**1991** (5th)	The Screaming Jets	"C'mon"
**1992** (6th)
**1992** (6th)	**Underground Lovers**	**Underground Lovers**
**1992** (6th)	Degenerates	Out Of My Head
**1992** (6th)	Euphoria	"Love You Right"
**1992** (6th)	Melissa	"Read My Lips"
**1992** (6th)	Jo Beth Taylor	"99 Reasons"
**1993** (7th)
**1993** (7th)	**Things of Stone and Wood**	**"Share This Wine"**
**1993** (7th)	Caligula	Caligula
**1993** (7th)	Girlfriend	Make It Come True
**1993** (7th)	Rick Price	"Not a Day Goes By"
**1993** (7th)	Tiddas	Inside My Kitchen
**1994** (8th)
**1994** (8th)	**The Badloves**	**Get On Board**
**1994** (8th)	Margot Smith	"Sleeping With The Lion"
**1994** (8th)	The Robertson Brothers	"I Know Why"
**1994** (8th)	Swoop	Thriller
**1994** (8th)	Vincent Stone	"Sunshine"
**1995** (9th)
**1995** (9th)	**Silverchair**	**Frogstomp**
**1995** (9th)	Magic Dirt	Life Was Better
**1995** (9th)	Max Sharam	A Million Year Girl
**1995** (9th)	Merril Bainbridge	"Mouth"
**1995** (9th)	The Truth	"My Heavy Friend"
**1996** (10th)
**1996** (10th)	**Monique Brumby**	**"Fool for You"**
**1996** (10th)	Fiona Kernaghan	Cypress Grove
**1996** (10th)	Human Nature	"Got It Goin' On"
**1996** (10th)	Rail	Bad Hair Life
**1996** (10th)	Ute	Under The External
**1997** (11th)
**1997** (11th)	**The Superjesus**	**Eight Step Rail**
**1997** (11th)	Fini Scad	"Coppertone" / "Testrider"
**1997** (11th)	Frank Bennett	Five O'Clock Shadow
**1997** (11th)	Jebediah	"Jerks of Attention"
**1997** (11th)	Rani	"Always On My Mind"
**1998** (12th)
**1998** (12th)	**Natalie Imbruglia**	**Left of the Middle**
**1998** (12th)	Bachelor Girl	"Buses and Trains"
**1998** (12th)	Diana Ah Naid	"I Go Off"
**1998** (12th)	Groove Terminator	"Losing Ground"
**1998** (12th)	Marie Wilson	"Next Time"
