= Kevin Hunt =

Kevin Hunt may refer to:

- Kevin Hunt (footballer, born 1975), English football player
- Kevin Hunt (American football) (1948–2015), American football player
- Kevin Hunt (Australian footballer) (1933–2016), Australian rules footballer
- Kevin Hunt (British Midland Flight 92), British Midland pilot
- Kevin Hunt (anthropologist)
- Kevin Hunt (musician), Australian jazz pianist and composer
