= Douglas Roberts (disambiguation) =

Douglas Roberts (1919–1976) was an Australian painter and art critic.

Douglas or Doug Roberts may also refer to:

- Doug Roberts (ice hockey) (born 1942), American ice hockey player
- Doug Roberts, Australian music producer, of Into the Blue and others
- Douglas B. Roberts (born 1947), former treasurer of Michigan, U.S.
- Doug Roberts, architect played by Paul Newman in the 1974 film The Towering Inferno
