= Eventide =

Eventide, an archaic word for evening, may also refer to:

- Eventide (EP), a 1998 EP by Monique Brumby
- Eventide (Magic: The Gathering), a 2008 trading card expansion set
- Eventide: A Scene in the Westminster Union, an 1878 painting by Hubert von Herkomer
- Eventide, Inc, an American audio, broadcast, and communications company
- "Eventide" (hymn), a hymn tune by William Henry Monk associated with the hymn "Abide with Me" by Henry Francis Lyte
- Eventide, a 2004 novel by Kent Haruf
- "Eventide", a 2023 song by Kamelot from The Awakening
- Eventide, a trilogy of hidden object games published by Artifex Mundi.
- Eventide Asset Management, a faith-based investment fund located in Boston.
