= Into the Blue (Monique Brumby album) =

Studio album by Monique Brumby
- Released: 13 March 2006
- Genres: Pop rock, Rock music, Adult alternative music
- Length: 51:48
- Labels: Little Wind, Rajon Music Group
- Producers: Monique Brumby, Doug Roberts

Monique Brumby chronology
Signal Hill (2002)	Into the Blue (2006)	Skeletons' Polka (2010)

Into the Blue is the third studio album by Australian singer songwriter and ARIA Award winner, Monique Brumby. The album was released in March 2006. The album was described as "Lyrical based rock/pop with attitude, honesty and originality."

"Daisy Chain" was released as the first and only single from the album.

== Background and release ==
Throughout 2004, Brumby toured extensively throughout Australia, including a performance in her home town of Hobart playing alongside Jewel and george as part of the 'A Day On The Green' concert. Live versions of "The Change in Me" and "Prophecy" by Brumby were released on the associated various artists' album, A Day on the Green, Live!. In 2005 she participated in Garageband, a project from Irish singer, Andy White, she recorded vocals for the band's self-titled album, Garageband. Brumby was the support act on the 2005 Australian tour by US group, The Bangles.

The album features her version of "Melting", co-written with Paul Kelly, which featured on his 1998 album, Words and Music.

== Reviews ==
An Amazon.com reviewer said; "Brumby has delivered a musical feast of songs exploring themes of friendship, hope, love and loss in a manner that will leave the listener yearning for more."

== Track listings ==
1. "Satellite" - 5:27
2. "Daisy Chain" - 5:31
3. "Wild Seed - 4:19
4. "Janie" - 5:27
5. "Procession" - 4:24
6. "Into the Blue" - 4:26
7. "Lucky Man" - 3:37
8. "Telegraph Exchange" - 4:11
9. "One Love" - 4:32
10. "Across This Land" - 4:49
11. "Melting" - 5:01
