= Alan Turnbull (drummer) =

Alan Lawrence Turnbull (23 November 1943 – 28 August 2014) was an Australian jazz drummer and freelance professional musician.

== Biography ==
Alan Turnbull was born in Melbourne, Australia, in 1943. After taking drum lessons from Graham Morgan he commenced his professional career at the age of 14, playing with top local jazz musicians such as Graeme Lyall, Keith Hounslow, Brian Brown (musician) while filling in for drummer Stewart Speer at Horst Liepolt's Melbourne jazz venue "Jazz Centre 44".

Moving to Sydney in the late 1960s, Turnbull soon became very active in the jazz scene and worked regularly as a freelance professional musician, including a number of years with the Don Burrows quartet which worked regularly at Sydney's El Rocco jazz club, the Wentwoth Hotel Supper Club, and at various concerts and venues throughout Australia. He also performed at various international festivals with that quartet, including Montreux Jazz Festival, Newport Jazz Festival and also at Carnegie Hall. The drumset/double bass partnership of Turnbull and American double bassist Ed Gaston set a new standard for swing jazz rhythm sections in Australia; and would influence Australian rhythm sections for decades.

In the following years he worked with a large number of high-profile jazz musicians and popular entertainers, including Milt Jackson, Joe Henderson, Gary Burton, Sonny Stitt, Barney Kessell, Richie Cole, Cleo Laine, Billy Eckstine, Cab Calloway, Billy Field, and Neil Sedaka and he has also performed with the Sydney Symphony Orchestra and the Australian Pops Orchestra.

Alan Turnbull appeared on numerous recordings, including those of Don Burrows, Rolf Stube's Jazz Police, Graeme Norris Band (recorded in New York City), The Jazz Co-op, The Two with Paul Macnamara, Neil Sedaka and Billy Field.

== Bibliography ==
- Clare, John (1995), Bodgie Dada and the Cult of the Cool, University of NSW Press. ISBN 0-86840-103-X.
- Bruce Johnson (1987), The Oxford Companion To Australian Jazz, Oxford University Press. ISBN 0-19-554791-8
