= Diana Anaid =

Australian rock singer-songwriter

- Also known as: Diana Ahnaid
- Born: Diana Gosper; 8 April 1976 (age 50); Newcastle, New South Wales, Australia
- Origin: Byron Bay, New South Wales, Australia
- Genres: Alternative rock, pop rock, post-grunge, dance-pop, acoustic rock
- Occupations: Singer-songwriter, producer
- Instruments: Vocals, guitar
- Years active: 1996–present
- Labels: Origin/MDS, Shock, Five Crowns, Forola/MGM Distribution
- Website: dianaanaid.com

Diana Anaid (born 8 April 1976) is the performance name of Diana Gosper, an Australian alternative rock singer-songwriter. From 1997 to 2003 she used the moniker, Diana ah Naid. Anaid has issued five studio albums, Diana ah Naid (8 April 1997, her 21st birthday), I Don't Think I'm Pregnant (September 1999), Beautiful Obscene (20 April 2004) Diana Anaid (2010) and My Queen (2017). 2007 also saw the release of Diana Anaid's first live album "Live At Bush Theatre" which was recorded in her home town of Nimbin, NSW.

Her self produced debut single, "I Go Off" (June 1997), peaked at No. 35 on the ARIA Singles Chart and soon became a fan favourite, having been given high rotation on TripleJ Radio. Another single, "Last Thing" (2004), reached the Top 40 Tracks on Billboard's component chart. Anaid was invited—after her first single was released—to perform live and solo on acoustic guitar to open the 1998 ARIA Awards ceremony, a rare honour for an emerging artist.

== Early life ==
Diana Anaid was born as Diana Gosper, in Newcastle, on 8 April 1976. Her mother died when Anaid was one year old. With her father and two older brothers, she "lived the archetypal hippie commune life, travelling around the northern part of the state". Anaid later recalled "my dad was travelling around the country trying to escape from his inner demons... It was a gypsy lifestyle and it was quite poor." She had "a long childhood involving children's homes, foster parents, charity organisations, food vouchers and freaks—often on the run from authority but with nowhere to go."

By the age of 15 Anaid had settled in the Lismore-Nimbin area, with her two siblings—their father had moved on. She turned to music, "I picked up the guitar... and taught myself how to play"; and performed in "folk / blues clubs and cafes of the region". Anaid undertook a year of education in Canberra, and with her then-partner, returned to Lismore. At the age of 16 Anaid had a son, Stone, and, for three years, she dropped out of the music industry to look after him. She used the moniker, Diana ah Naid, as an almost palindrome, "a reverse of her first name – except she added the letter 'H'" The 'H' was added for numerological effect, as it "represents the number '8' which signifies 'power' and 'forcefulness' and 'infinity'."

== Career ==
=== 1997–99: First albums ===
Anaid recorded her debut album, Diana ah Naid, in Byron Bay for the cost of AUD$10,000, she had 500 copies pressed and launched it at the Nimbin Bush Theatre on her 21st birthday, 8 April 1997. Her sponsor was a Greenpeace activist from the Netherlands. She sent a copy to Triple J's radio presenter, Richard Kingsmill, who played its lead track, "I Go Off". Anaid signed with Origin Records, an independent Sydney-based label. Graham Bidstrup (of GANGgajang) remixed and, with Anaid, co-produced the album, which was re-released in September. Australian musicologist, Ian McFarlane, described it as "a restless, funky brand of acoustic guitar folk with urgently charged vocals (akin to Ani DiFranco) backed by an emotional, primal energy." Tom Schulte of AllMusic found it was "promising and deserving of attention from those that like hyper-individualist/feminist folk-rock with the emphasis on rock."

"I Go Off" was issued as a single in June 1997, which peaked at No. 35 on the ARIA Singles Chart. McFarlane felt it "highlighted ah Naid's confident and passionate delivery over sparse yet adept guitar work." Anaid had written the track after the father of her then-boyfriend, who had seen her perform at Byron Bay Bluesfest in 1996, had told her she would never succeed, "because you just don't go off." It received extensive airplay on Triple J; where it was listed at No. 58 on the annual listener's poll, Triple J Hottest 100, 1997. It was included on the various artists compilation CD for that year, the Triple J Hottest 100, Volume 5. At the ARIA Music Awards of 1998 she was nominated for Best New Talent and Breakthrough Artist – Single for "I Go Off".

Early in 1998 Anaid supported concerts by Cake, Wendy Matthews and The Whitlams. She followed with an appearance at SXSW in Austin, Texas and gigs in New York and Los Angeles. Anaid developed a cyst on her vocal cords, which she had surgically removed in 1998. Her recovery prevented performing for about a year. Nevertheless, two singles were issued during the year, "Leaving the Country" (April) and "Oh No" (October). At the ARIA Music Awards of 1999 "Oh No (Curbside Lullaby)" was nominated for Best Independent Release.

Anaid's second studio album, I Don't Think I'm Pregnant (September 1999), was produced by Ashley Manning. It was released on Origin and distributed by Shock Records. McFarlane opined that it "was a convincing follow-up." The album provided three singles, "Perfect Family" (August 1999), "Love Song for a Girl" and "Don't Believe in Love" (February 2000). Her backing band were Natt Prang on guitar, Doug E. Styles on drums and Jed Venus on bass guitar. "Perfect Family" was listed at No. 55 on the Triple J Hottest 100, 1999, and was used on the related various artists album, Triple J Hottest 100 Volume 7 (2000). At the ARIA Music Awards of 2000 I Don't Think I'm Pregnant was nominated for Best Independent Release and Best Female Artist.

Australian music journalist, Ed Nimmervoll of In-Site, felt that "Don't Believe in Love" showed Anaid was "One of the most interesting performers and recording artists working on the Australian music scene over recent years. She's still a work in progress. Her songs don't quite match her ambition." Fellow singer-songwriter, Ella Hooper (of Killing Heidi) declared I Don't Think I'm Pregnant as her favourite album of the year, "She's cool, and she rocks!"

=== 2000–10: Third and fourth albums ===
During 2000 Anaid toured Australia with Monique Brumby and Deborah Conway. Anaid and Brumby became friends; Anaid recalled, "although we haven't seen much of each other, we get along so well that when we do hang out we get along like a house on fire."

In 2003 Anaid modified her performance name, dropping the 'H', so that it is a complete palindrome: Diana Anaid.

Her third studio album, Beautiful Obscene (20 April 2004), was produced by Kalju Tonuma. Further production was made by Ted Hutt (No Doubt, Bush) and Paul Palmer in Los Angeles. Anaid was the first artist Palmer signed to his own label, Five Crowns Records. For the album her backing musicians include Hutt on bass guitar, Nathan Correy on electric guitar, and Florian Reinhert on drums. Billboard's Christie Eliezer noted that the album's "outspoken lyrics reflect a traumatic childhood"; she related that "early Faith No More, Red Hot Chilli Peppers and Nirvana helped me a lot."

"Last Thing" (October 2004), first single released in America from the album, received airplay across the USA. Anaid toured and promoted her material in the United States. It became her first international hit, when it appeared on the Billboard component chart, peaking at No. 26 Top 40 Tracks. In Australia it reached No. 14 on the ARIA Hitseekers Singles Chart. During this time, Anaid took another hiatus from the music industry – her father died from cancer – and she was raising her adolescent son.

Anaid issued her first live album, Live at the Bush Theatre, on 20 February 2007, via her own label Forola Music. It was recorded in Nimbin in July 2006, with Anaid performing alone on guitar and vocals. Glen Humprhies of Illawarra Mercury felt her lyrics provide "a real portrayal of love and life – warts and all – whether it's about the harsh reality of break-ups ('Perfect Family') or waking up after a one-night stand to have the guy confess he has a girlfriend ('Piece of Me')." "Cheatin' on Me" was released as her first single, on 27 October, on her label.

On 25 September 2009 her next single, "Cynical on Waking", was released ahead of her fourth studio album, Diana Anaid, which appeared in February 2010. She undertook a tour of the east coast of Australia during October 2009. During August to September in the following year Anaid co-headlined a national tour with Brumby, each promoted their respective fourth albums. The pair co-wrote and performed a duet on a track, "Love Is a Weapon", which provided the name for their tour.

=== 2011 to present ===
In January 2011, Diana Anaid was nominated in the 10th Annual Independent Music Awards for her song "Charity" in the Sing Out for Social Action Song category. It was recorded by Anaid on lead vocals and acoustic guitar; Correy on electric and bass guitars; and Dean Belcastro on drums and keyboards. The track was written by Anaid and Correy.

In February 2017 Anaid announced that she had recorded her fifth album, titled My Queen. Its first single, "Can't Apologise", was released in July 2017 with an accompanying music video, directed by Nick Egan. "Can't Apologise" saw radio support across the country as Diana toured nationally and through New Zealand with Adam and The Ants and her own headline shows. Early accolades for My Queen include "Diana’s a rock ‘n’ roll firecracker... a totally passionate one-off'"- Michael Smith – Rhythms "My Queen' has all the heartache, wit, poetry and honesty of her most well-known work." – MJ O'Neill-TheMusic and producer Steve James has the following praise for Diana's My Queen album "My Queen stands up as one of the best records I’ve recorded. I’ve got a short list of 10 of the hundreds of records I have worked on, including The Screaming Jets, Monty Python’s – The Rutles, Toyah Wilcox, Weta, The Rumjacks and now My Queen has been added to that list. " Following on from "Can't Apologise" second single "Better Girl" was released early in 2018 to more rave reviews "...wistful and edgy, rebellious and arty, relentlessly creative..with an amazing voice." 100% Rock "The spirit is honest, heartfelt and pleads with listeners to, well, listen...'" MusicLove "..the alternative rock/pop on display is world class." OverDrive. Touring nationally in support of "Better Girl" Diana was described as "..the Australian equivalent of Alanis Morissette" and "one of a kind" with the video clip being described as "incredibly powerful" (MGM) and "life changing". 2018 also saw the release of third single from My Queen, the "timeless classic" Leaving Town, along with its "highly effective" (theMusic.com.au) music video. Diana says about the video "The whole concept of the animation really drew me in when I connected it to the song," adds Anaid. "There were some powerful correlations, beginning with the opening moments, where the girl dives into her inner wisdom, and through to the end where she is a wise, integral, connected old woman.

"Leaving Town also relates to finding ones inner strength and connecting to something deeper, walking your own path and making a positive difference. The whole animation seems to throb and sway naturally with the beat of the song."

== Discography ==
=== Studio albums ===
Title	Album details	Peak chart positions
Title	Album details	AUS
Diana ah Naid	Released: September 1997; Label: Diana ah Naid (BE121) / ORiGiN (OR 038); Format: CD	104
I Don't Think I'm Pregnant	Released: August 1999; Label: ORiGiN (OR 048); Format: CD	94
Beautiful Obscene	Released: June 2004; Label: ORiGiN (OR 070); Format: CD, digital	-
Diana Anaid	Released: April 2010; Label: Forola, MGM (FORCD0003); Format: CD, digital	-
My Queen	Released: 2017; Label: Forola, MGM (FORCD0004); Format: CD, digital	-

=== Live albums ===
Title	Album details	Peak chart positions
Title	Album details	AUS
Live at the Bush Theatre	Released: February 2007; Label: Forola (FORCD0001); Format: CD, digital	-

=== Singles ===
Singles – chart and streaming positions
Title	Year	AUS	US (Billboard)	Notes
"I Go Off"	1997	35		One of the most played songs on Australian radio in 1997
"Perfect Family"	1999	48		
"Last Thing"	2004	138	26	Top 10 iTunes Pop Singles (2004)

List of singles, with Australian chart positions
Title	Year	Peak chart positions	Album
Title	Year	AUS	Album
"I Go Off"	1997	36	Diana ah Naid
"See Through"	1997	—	Diana ah Naid
"Leaving the Country"	1998	—	Diana ah Naid
"Oh No"	1998	—	Diana ah Naid
"Perfect Family"	1999	120	I Don't Think I'm Pregnant
"Paper Hat"	1999	—	I Don't Think I'm Pregnant
"Don't Believe in Love"	2000	79	I Don't Think I'm Pregnant
"Love Song for a Girl"	2001	108	I Don't Think I'm Pregnant
"Last Thing"	2004	138	Beautiful Obscene
"Cheatin' on Me"	2007	—	non album single
"Cynical on Waking"	2009	—	Diana Anaid
"Can't Apologise"	2017	—	My Queen
"Better Girl"	2018	—	My Queen
"Leaving Town"	2018	—	My Queen

== Awards and nominations ==
=== ARIA Music Awards ===
The ARIA Music Awards is an annual awards ceremony that recognises excellence, innovation, and achievement across all genres of Australian music. They commenced in 1987.

Year	Nominee / work	Award	Result	Ref.
1998	"I Go Off"	Best New Talent	Nominated	
1998	"I Go Off"	Breakthrough Artist – Single	Nominated	
1999	"Oh No (Curbside Lullaby)"	Best Independent Release	Nominated	
2000	I Don't Think I'm Pregnant	Best Female Artist	Nominated	
2000	I Don't Think I'm Pregnant	Best Independent Release	Nominated	
