= Next Time (disambiguation) =

Next Time is a rock duo from North Macedonia.

Next Time may also refer to:

- Next Time (album)
- "Next Time" (Marie Wilson song), 1998
- "Next Time" (Brooke Hogan song), 2006
- "Next Time" (Keyshia Cole song), 2014

== See also ==
- The Next Time, 1962 song by Cliff Richard
