= Who's Gonna Take the Weight? =

Who's Gonna Take the Weight? may refer to:

- "Who's Gonna Take the Weight?" (Luke Cage), a television episode from the first season of Luke Cage
- "Who's Gonna Take the Weight", a song by Kool & the Gang on the album Live at the Sex Machine, 1971
- "Who's Gonna Take the Weight?", a song by Gang Starr on the album Step in the Arena, 1990
- "Who's Gonna Take the Weight?", a song by Groove Terminator on the album Road Kill, 2000
- Who's Gonna Take the Weight?, a book by Kevin Powell, 2002
