= Signal Hill (album) =

Studio album by Monique Brumby
- Released: 7 October 2002
- Genre: Pop rock, rock
- Label: Little Wind, Shock
- Producer: Monique Brumby, Stephen Moffatt, Simon Polanski, Paul McKercher

Monique Brumby chronology
Eventide (EP) (1998)	Signal Hill (2002)	Into the Blue (2006)

Signal Hill is the second studio album by Australian singer songwriter, Monique Brumby, which was released in October 2002. It was co-produced by Brumby with Paul McKercher, Stephen Moffatt and Simon Polanski.

== Background and release ==
Following the success of her debut studio album Thylacine in 1997, Brumby began working on her second album, Signal Hill, but conflict with the record label meant they parted ways and Brumby set up her own label, Little Wind.

"Silver Dollars" was released in November 2000 as the album's first single. This was followed by "As Sweet as You Are" in October 2002. "Driving Home" was released after the album appeared as its third single in March 2003. Brumby toured the east coast of Australia as a support act to Michelle Shocked in April 2003.

Brumby described her album; "It was very hard to decide what songs to put together. I really thought these 12 songs worked well together as a body of work, and took me on a journey – I think I moved through a place of frustration and hurt and sadness to enlightenment and jubilation" (adding) "That frustration came in the form of pressure – to conform to the expectations of the mainstream music industry."

== Reviews ==
Signal Hill received generally positive reviews. Sain Magazine said "[Brumby]'s new album has been a work in progress probably longer than she cares to admit but, here, on Signal Hill, she reminds everyone why she was ARIA's best female artist in '97. Distinct melodies and strong as steel hooks and licks, [her] style has always set her apart from the pack. For instance, the opener 'As Sweet As You Are' is a killer ode Sinéad O'Connor would gladly shave her head again for while 'Driving Home' is more fun than '24 hours of 24'. If commercial radio would just get behind her, the world could be her oyster once again." TNT said "Her new album, Signal Hill has just been released to an eager Australian music press and it looks like another success. The opener 'As Sweet As You Are' skips and jumps with happiness, but Brumby also uses her sometimes smokey voice to good effect with more melancholic tracks such as 'Eventide'."

Time Off (Brisbane) said "After a musical hiatus of some four years, [Brumby] returns with a positive attitude and upbeat tempo on Signal Hill, an album that should continue to see her star rise. There's a lot to like about [the album], with textured vocals and a breezy feel coasting you through the 12 tracks." Qantas In-flight magazine said "A few more up-tempo pop tracks here from this Australian who's known for her beautiful ballads. Brumby's great voice and some top guest musicians make this an excellent album.". The Herald Sun said; "Brumby's powerful, melodic voice shines right throughout this release. The first part of Signal Hill captures [her] joy of music and is heavily influenced by country roots music and female musicians such as Lucinda Williams. However, the mood turns darker further on as [the artist]'s flair for a sunshiny pop song disappears under layers of guitars. Toward the end, 'Eventide' manages to recapture her gentler style, but is almost drowned out by brooding closer 'Prophecy'. In a word: moody."

== Track listings ==
1. "As Sweet As You Are" - 3:15
2. "Driving Home" - 3:40
3. "I Got This Yacht" - 3:40
4. "Wired" - 3:36
5. "Silver Dollars" - 3:46
6. "Blood Money" - 3:13
7. "Overcome" - 4:20
8. "The Weight of a Memory" - 3:25
9. "Radiate" - 3:43
10. "Observations From Flat 3" - 4:39
11. "Eventide" - 3:57
12. "Prophecy" - 5:44
