= Cordrazine =

Cordrazine may refer to:

- A fictional drug in Star Trek, Earth: Final Conflict and the Mission: Impossible television series.
- Cordrazine (band), an Australian musical group.
