= Groove Terminator =

Australian electronic music artist

- Also known as: GT
- Born: Simon Jude Lewicki; 1971 or 1972 (age 54–55); Adelaide, South Australia, Australia
- Genre: Electronic
- Occupations: DJ, musician, producer
- Instruments: keyboards; backing vocals; bongo; cowbell
- Label: Virgin
- Member of: Jump Jump Dance Dance
- Formerly of: Hoops Inc.; Chili Hi Fly; Tonite Only

Simon Jude Lewicki (born 1969), who performs as Groove Terminator or GT, is an Australian electronic artist. Originally a hip-hop DJ, Lewicki began spinning house music. He was featured on the 2000 Australian edition of Ministry of Sound's Club Nation series. His song "Here Comes Another One" was the theme of the popular Australian reality TV-show The Block (2003). Groove Terminator's debut studio album, Road Kill (February 2000), reached the ARIA albums chart top 40. It provided the single, "One More Time (The Sunshine Song)" (2000), which peaked at No. 25 on the related singles chart.

== Career ==
Simon Jude Lewicki was born in 1969 in Adelaide. His parents helped found Adelaide's first community radio station, where his mother was a presenter. His first concert attendance was Ramones at Thebarton Theatre, Adelaide, as an eight-year-old in July 1980. Lewicki's DJing began from age 13, with the creation of mix-tapes on weekends for community radio. He later recalled, "Mum was doing a radio show. That's how I fell into the whole thing. I was doing a high school radio show and from then on it snowballed really." He had been a fan of punk rock prior to discovering electronic and dance music.

Lewicki first performed as a scratch turntablist in the Adelaide-based hip hop duo, Major Rhyme Squad (fl. 1990), with MC Say. In the early 1990s he was part of an Adelaide hip-hop group, Finger Lickin' Good, alongside DJ Madcap and Quro. Their sole release was a 1993 vinyl extended play, Illegitimate Sons of the Bastard Funk. Also in that year Lewicki issued two solo extended plays, Jump (January) and Predator (July). In 1995, Lewicki formed Hoops Inc. with Steven Hooper and they released two singles. During the mid-1990s Lewicki relocated to Sydney.

Groove Terminator began releasing solo singles, "It's On" (1996) and "Losing Ground" (1997). His debut album, Road Kill followed in February 2000 via Virgin Records. To promote the album he toured in support of the rock band, Grinspoon. Road Kill peaked at No. 39 on the ARIA albums chart. It provided four charting singles, with the second one, "Here Comes Another One", used as the theme of the popular Australian reality TV-show The Block (2003) and had previously featured in the cult spoof-slasher film, Cut (1999). It was followed by "One More Time (The Sunshine Song)" (May 2000), which reached No. 25 on the ARIA singles chart.

Groove Terminator, alongside fellow DJs Nick Skitz and Bexta, is credited with breaking electronic and dance music into regional Australian venues. He was featured on the 2000 Australian edition of Ministry of Sound's Club Nation series, which Jason Birchmeier of AllMusic described, "[it] showcases the U.K. style of club-orientated disco and garage-influenced house that he favors." In 2002, Groove Terminator began releasing music as GT. A second album, Electrifyin' Mojo, was issued in November 2002, which did not reach the top 100 but did provide two charting singles.

Lewicki has worked in several other bands and formed Tonite Only with Sam La More in 2005 in Sydney – they were signed to Ministry of Sound's sub-label Hussle Black. In 2007, Lewicki relocated to Los Angeles where he continued production and DJ work. In 2009, Lewicki started the electronic rock duo, Jump Jump Dance Dance, with American singer-guitarist Chris Carter (DJ Snakepanther). Jump Jump Dance Dance's self-titled, debut album was released in July 2011. In 2012 GT began releasing collaborative singles with various artists. In 2017 and 2018, Groove Terminator toured with Ministry of Sound: Orchestrated, which brought a set of house, rave and club classics arranged for orchestral performance to major venues around Australia. Lewicki is co-creator of the music festival Block Rocking Beats, which premiered at McLaren Vale, South Australia in December 2019.

The artist collaborated with Soweto Gospel Choir to periodically perform History of House in the 2020s. Hi Fi Way's Kim Burley rated their performance at Adelaide Fringe Festival in March 2023 at five stars and explained, "Taking us on a journey through the latter decades of the last millennium, GT showed that even for us devotees who have attended every new performance in the past few years, that house music remains relevant, vibrant, and a passion for many... a truly remarkable performance. Shine bright like the music SWG and GT!" An album of that name was issued in August 2024, which was nominated for Best World Music Album at the 2024 ARIA Music Awards.

== Discography ==
=== Studio albums ===
List of albums, with selected chart positions
Title	Album details	Peak chart positions
Title	Album details	AUS
Road Kill	Released: February 2000; Label: Virgin Records (7243848995 2 3); Format: CD	39
Electrifyin' Mojo (by GT)	Released: 8 November 2002; Label: Virgin Records (7243542843 2 8), EMI (5428432); Format: CD	-
History of House (with Soweto Gospel Choir)	Released: August 2024; Label: Umculo House; Format: digital	-

=== Singles ===
List of singles, with selected chart positions
Title	Year	Peak chart positions	Album
Title	Year	AUS	Album
"It's On"	1996	-	non-album single
"Losing Ground"	1997	64	Road Kill
"Here Comes Another One" (featuring Basshoppa)	1999	73	Road Kill
"One More Time"	2000	25	Road Kill
"You Can't See" (featuring Kool Keith)	2000	74	Road Kill
"This Is Not a Love Song"	2002	73	Electrifyin' Mojo
"Brand New Day"	2002	94	Electrifyin' Mojo
"Kid Dynamite"	2003	-	Electrifyin' Mojo
"Begin" (with Christian Luke & Mr Wilson)	2012	-	non-album singles
"Feels Like It Should" (with Wildfire featuring Freaks in Love)	2015	-	non-album singles
"This Is My Love " (with Wildfire featuring NickClow)	2015	-	non-album singles
"Not Alone" (with Wildfire)	2016	-	non-album singles
"Little Dance" (with Wildfire featuring Pamp Le Mousse)	2017	-	non-album singles
"I'm Telling You " (with Wildfire & Olsen)	2017	-	non-album singles

== Awards ==
=== ARIA Music Awards ===
The ARIA Music Awards is an annual awards ceremony that recognises excellence, innovation, and achievement across all genres of Australian music. Groove Terminator has been nominated for four awards.

Year	Nominee / work	Award	Result
1998	"Losing Ground"	Best Video	Nominated
1998	"Losing Ground"	Best New Talent	Nominated
2000	Road Kill	Best Male Artist	Nominated
2000	Road Kill	Best Cover Art	Nominated
2024	History of House (with Soweto Gospel Choir)	Best World Music Album	Nominated

== Associated acts ==
- Hoops Inc. (c.1995)
- Chili Hi Fly (2000–2002)
- Tonite Only (2005–2006, 2008, 2011–2012, 2014)
- Jump Jump Dance Dance (2007–present)
