= One More Time (The Sunshine Song) =

2000 single by Groove Terminator

Single by Groove Terminator

from the album Road Kill
- Released: 15 May 2000
- Length: 3:23
- Label: Virgin
- Songwriters: Simon Lewicki; James Rado; Gerome Ragni; Galt MacDermot
- Producer: Simon Lewicki

Groove Terminator singles chronology
"Here Comes Another One" (1999)	"One More Time (The Sunshine Song)" (2000)	"You Can't See" (2000)

"One More Time (The Sunshine Song)" is a song by Australian electronic music group Groove Terminator. It was released in May 2000 as the second official single from the band's debut studio album, Road Kill. The song contains elements of the 5th Dimension's "Let the Sunshine In" and peaked at number 25 on the Australian ARIA Singles Chart.

== Track listings ==
CD single

1. "One More Time (The Sunshine Song)" – 3:23
2. "One More Time (The Sunshine Song)" (Killers on the Loose remix) – 5:26
3. "One More Time (The Sunshine Song)" (extended mix) – 5:20
4. "Afraid of the Dark Part 1" – 5:09
5. "Give It Up" (Force Mass Motion mix) – 7:14

== Charts ==
Chart (2000)	Peak position
Australia (ARIA)	25
