= Won't Keep a Good Girl Down =

Single by Marie Wilson

from the album Real Life
- Released: July 1998
- Recorded: Joe's Garage, Memphis, Tennessee
- Length: 3:28
- Label: EastWest / Warner
- Songwriter(s): Jim Vallance; Mark Hudson; Marie Wilson

Marie Wilson singles chronology
"Next Time" (1998)	"Won't Keep a Good Girl Down" (1998)	"Rescue Me" (1998)

"Won't Keep a Good Girl Down" is a song recorded by Australian singer Marie Wilson, and released in July 1998 as the second single from her debut studio album, Real Life. The song peaked at number 21 on the ARIA Charts.

== Background and recording ==
Won't Keep a Good Girl Down was co-written by Jim Vallance, Mark Hudson and Marie Wilson at Miles Copeland's castle (Chateau de Marouatte) in France in September 1997.

Vallance recalled "During the writing session, Mark and I felt very strongly that the song should be titled 'CAN'T Keep a Good Girl Down' ... an obvious word-play on the cliche 'you can't keep a good man down'. In particular we believed the "Can't / Keep" alliteration was one of the lyric's stronger elements. [Marie] insisted we call the song 'WON'T Keep a Good Girl Down' saying that she found the word 'can't' awkward to sing with her Australian accent. At the end of the day, Marie is the recording artist ... the one who has to sing the song and put her name and picture on the CD cover. For that reason, Mark and I acquiesced. Personally, I still prefer the word 'can't'."

== Track listing ==
CD single (EastWest – 3984240482)

1. "Won't Keep a Good Girl Down" - 3:25
2. "Won't Keep a Good Girl Down" (Acoustic Version) - 3:23
3. "Jimmy" - 3:23
4. "Next Time" - 4:25

== Charts ==
Chart (1998)	Peak position
Australia (ARIA)	31
