= Fisherman's Daughter (album) =

Studio album by Kavisha Mazzella
- Released: 1998
- Label: Black Market Music

Kavisha Mazzella chronology
Mermaids in the Well (1995)	Fisherman's Daughter (1998)	Canberra, Cork, Calgary ... Live (2000)

Fisherman's Daughter is the second studio album by Australian musician, Kavisha Mazzella. The album was released in 1998.

At the ARIA Music Awards of 1998, the album won the ARIA Award for Best World Music Album.

== Track listing ==
1. "Big Blue Above" - 2:17
2. "Fisherman's Daughter" - 4:46
3. "All I Want Is You" - 3:48
4. "Gypsy Song" - 7:03
5. "Swan River" - 2:05
6. "Viv's Song" - 3:37
7. "Fishermen Pull in the Sad Nets" - 2:34
8. "Lovewrecked" - 3:52
9. "Wolf" - 5:11
10. "Angel of Pompeii" - 5:09
11. "Storm About to Happen" - 2:51
12. "Polly" - 6:03
13. "Big Blue Above" (Reprise) - 1:46
