= Margot Smith =

- Born: Margot Josephine Smith; 19 September 1966; Brisbane, Queensland, Australia
- Died: 17 April 2011 (aged 44) Sydney, New South Wales, Australia
- Genres: Rock
- Occupation: Singer-songwriter
- Instruments: Vocals; keyboards
- Years active: 1985–2011
- Labels: EMI; Immersion/Phantom; Independent

Margot Josephine Smith (19 September 1966 – 17 April 2011) was an Australian singer-songwriter and keyboardist. Her debut album, Sleeping with the Lion, was produced by Eddie Rayner and Steve Kilbey and was released in October 1993. That album was nominated for the 1994 ARIA Award for Best New Talent. She issued her second album, Taste, in February 1998. After Smith died Kilbey, and fellow members of his band the Church, organised a tribute concert in her honour in September 2011. A posthumous album, Inhumaninane, appeared in the following year.

== Biography ==
Margot Josephine Smith was born on 19 September 1966. She began her music career in Brisbane, where she performed in clubs as the lead singer of the Willie May Trio. By the early 1990s she had relocated to Melbourne where she recorded demos and was consequently signed to EMI Music Australia.

Her debut album, Sleeping with the Lion, appeared in October 1993. Smith provided lead vocals and keyboards, it was co-produced by Steve Kilbey of the Church and Eddie Rayner (ex-Split Enz): both also performed on the album. Nicole Leedham of The Canberra Times saw her performance in October 1993 and observed, "about 70 people listened enthralled to the half-hour of Margot's 'showcase'. Expect more from this lady." At the ARIA Music Awards of 1994 Smith was nominated for Best New Talent for Sleeping with the Lion.

After residing in the United States Smith relocated to Sydney where Kilbey and fellow members of the Church worked on her second album, Taste (February 1998), via Immersion Music/Phantom Records. In mid-1999 she toured with her backing band, Lodestar, comprising Mark Tobin on guitar, Wayne Tritton on rhythm guitar, Simon Wale on drums and Steve Waters on bass guitar and backing vocals. Smith provided guest vocals on the Church's Peter Koppes' fifth solo album, Simple Intent, in August 2002 via Immersion Music.

Smith died on 17 April 2011 in Bondi, aged 44. A tribute concert organised by Kilbey, Koppes and Tim Powles (all from the Church), was held in her honour in September 2011. According to Kilbey, "one of the most brilliant singer/songwriters I have ever heard... She had a gift for composing on the spot." The concert included material from her two albums as well as previously unreleased works. Her third album, Inhumaninane, appeared posthumously in 2012.

== Discography ==
=== Albums ===
Title	Details
Sleeping with the Lion	Released: October 1993; Label: EMI (8270062); Format: CD
Taste	Released: 1998; Label: Immersion Music/Phantom Records (IMM002CD); Format: CD
Inhumaninane (with The 9 Lonely Spirits)	Released: 2012; Label: Margot Smith; Format: CD

=== Singles ===
Year	Title	Album
1993	"Fall Down"	Sleeping with the Lion
1993	"Adored"	Sleeping with the Lion
1998	"Bleedmore"	Taste

== Awards ==
=== ARIA Music Awards ===
The ARIA Music Awards is an annual awards ceremony that recognises excellence, innovation, and achievement across all genres of Australian music. Margot Smith was nominated for one awards.

Year	Nominee / work	Award	Result
1994	Sleeping with the Lion	Best New Talent	Nominated
