= 1998 ARIA Music Awards =

Annual Australian music awards

- Date: 20 October 1998
- Venue: Capitol Theatre, Sydney, New South Wales
- Hosted by: Paul McDermott

Highlights
- Most wins: Natalie Imbruglia (6)
- Most nominations: Natalie Imbruglia (9)
- Website: ariaawards.com.au

Television/radio coverage
- Network: Network Ten

The 12th Australian Recording Industry Association Music Awards (generally known as the ARIA Music Awards or simply the ARIAs) was held on 20 October 1998 at the Capitol Theatre in Sydney. Presenters, including Democrats deputy leader Natasha Stott Despoja and former prime minister Gough Whitlam, distributed 29 awards with the big winner Natalie Imbruglia receiving six trophies.

In addition to previous categories, a new category Best Rock Album, was presented to the Superjesus for Sumo. An Outstanding Achievement Award was presented to Savage Garden for "world sales of 8 million and counting". The ARIA Hall of Fame inducted: the Angels and the Masters Apprentices.

== Ceremony details ==
The ceremony was hosted by comedian and TV presenter Paul McDermott with a capacity crowd of 1900 attending. Presenters (see below for full list) distributed 29 trophies. Best Group winners the Whitlams received their award from the group's namesake Gough Whitlam. The former prime minister announced "It's my family." Once on stage the members knelt at his feet. Upon accepting Savage Garden's award for Outstanding Achievement – selling more than eight million copies world-wide – band member Darren Hayes reflected, "My nephew told me not to come home without the Wiggles' autographs."

=== Presenters and performers ===
The ARIA Awards ceremony was hosted by Australian comedian and TV presenter Paul McDermott. Presenters and performers were:

| Presenter(s) | Performer(s) | Ref. |
|---|---|---|
| Kylie Minogue | Regurgitator | |
| Dylan Lewis | Regurgitator | |
| Grinspoon | Regurgitator | |
| Robyn Loau | Natalie Imbruglia | |
| "Ugly" Phil O'Neil | Natalie Imbruglia | |
| B*Witched | Natalie Imbruglia | |
| Colin Buchanan | the Living End | |
| Baz Luhrmann | the Living End | |
| Glenn A. Baker | the Living End | |
| Alana De Roma | Bachelor Girl | |
| Penne Dennison | Bachelor Girl | |
| Martin Plaza | Bachelor Girl | |
| Flacco | John Williamson, Warren H Williams | |
| the Sandman | John Williamson, Warren H Williams | |
| Christopher Lawrence | John Williamson, Warren H Williams | |
| Natasha Stott Despoja | Jebediah | |
| Angry Anderson | Jebediah | |
| Monique Brumby | Jebediah | |
| Leah McLeod | Marie Wilson | |
| Belinda Emmett | Marie Wilson | |
| Paul Kelly | Marie Wilson | |
| Marcia Hines | Human Nature | |
| Julian Lennon | Human Nature | |
| Alex Dimitriades | Human Nature | |
| Alchemy Hosts | The Mavis's | |
| Savage Garden | The Mavis's | |
| Jabba | The Mavis's | |
| Mary Datoc | The Whitlams | |
| Gough Whitlam | The Whitlams | |

== Awards ==
Final nominees for awards are shown in plain, with winners in bold.

=== ARIA Awards ===
- Album of the Year
  - **Regurgitator – Unit**
    - Natalie Imbruglia – Left of the Middle
    - Kylie Minogue – Impossible Princess
    - The Whitlams – Eternal Nightcap
    - You Am I – #4 Record
- Single of the Year
  - **Natalie Imbruglia – "Torn"**
    - The Living End – "Second Solution / Prisoner of Society"
    - The Mavis's – "Cry"
    - Kylie Minogue – "Did It Again"
    - The Whitlams – "No Aphrodisiac"
- Highest Selling Album
  - **Savage Garden – Savage Garden**
    - John Farnham – Anthology
    - Midnight Oil – 20,000 Watt R.S.L.
    - The 12th Man – Bill Lawry... This Is Your Life
    - Tina Arena – In Deep
- Highest Selling Single
  - **The Living End – "Second Solution / Prisoner of Society"**
    - John Farnham & Human Nature – "Every Time You Cry"
    - Natalie Imbruglia – "Big Mistake"
    - Natalie Imbruglia – "Torn"
    - Tina Arena – "Burn"
- Best Group
  - **The Whitlams – Eternal Nightcap**
    - Regurgitator – Unit
    - Savage Garden – "Universe"
    - The Superjesus – Sumo
    - You Am I – #4 Record
- Best Female Artist
  - **Natalie Imbruglia – Left of the Middle**
    - Tina Arena – In Deep
    - Monique Brumby – Thylacine
    - Kate Ceberano – "Pash"
    - Kylie Minogue – Impossible Princess
- Best Male Artist
  - **Paul Kelly – Words and Music**
    - Ed Kuepper – Live!
    - Mark Seymour – King Without a Clue
    - Matt Walker – I Listen to the Night
    - Chris Wilson – The Long Weekend
- Best New Talent
  - **Natalie Imbruglia – Left of the Middle**
    - Bachelor Girl – "Buses and Trains"
    - Groove Terminator – "Losing Ground"
    - Diana Anaid – "I Go Off"
    - Marie Wilson – "Next Time"
- Breakthrough Artist – Album
  - **Natalie Imbruglia – Left of the Middle**
    - Cordrazine – From Here to Wherever
    - Grinspoon – Guide to Better Living
    - Jebediah – Slightly Odway
    - The Superjesus – Sumo
- Breakthrough Artist – Single
  - **Natalie Imbruglia – "Torn"**
    - Hot Rollers – "Wickerman Shoes"
    - Diana Anaid – "I Go Off"
    - Primary – "Vicious Precious"
    - Marie Wilson – "Next Time"
- Best Dance Release
  - **Sgt Slick – White Treble, Black Bass**
    - Endorphin – Embrace
    - Friendly – Hello Bellybutton
    - Frontside – "Dammerung" / "Mind Distortion"
    - Pee Wee Ferris – Social Narcotic
- Best Pop Release
  - **Natalie Imbruglia – Left of the Middle**
    - The Mavis's – Pink Pills
    - Kylie Minogue – Impossible Princess
    - Snout – Circle High and Wide
    - The Whitlams – Eternal Nightcap
- Best Rock Album
  - **The Superjesus - Sumo**
    - The Angels - Skin & Bone
    - Moler - Golden Duck
    - Ricaine - The Clarity of Distance
    - The Screaming Jets - World Gone Crazy
- Best Country Album
  - **Shanley Del – My Own Sweet Time**
    - Colin Buchanan – Edge of the Kimberley
    - Troy Cassar-Daley – True Believer
    - Gina Jeffreys – Someboy's Daughter
    - The Wheel – The Wheel
- Best Independent Release
  - **The Whitlams – Eternal Nightcap**
    - The Blackeyed Susans – Spin the Bottle
    - Karma County – Olana
    - The Living End – "Second Solution / Prisoner of Society"
    - TISM – www.tism.wanker.com
- Best Alternative Release
  - **Regurgitator – Unit**
    - Dirty Three – Ocean Songs
    - The Living End – "Second Solution / Prisoner of Society"
    - The Paradise Motel – Flight Paths
    - You Am I – #4 Record
- Best Indigenous Release
  - **Archie Roach – Looking for Butter Boy**
    - Gondwana – Xenophon
    - Singers for the Red Black and Gold – "Yil Lull"
    - John Williamson & Warren H Williams – Raining on the Rock
    - Bart Willoughby – Pathways
- Best Adult Contemporary Album
  - **Archie Roach – Looking for Butter Boy**
    - David Campbell – Taking the Wheel
    - Colin Hay – Transcendental Highway
    - The Killjoys – Sun Bright Deep
    - Wendy Matthews – Ghosts
- Best Comedy Release
  - **Paul McDermott – Unplugged Good News Week Tapes Volume 1**
    - The 12th Man – Bill Lawry... This Is Your Life
    - Jimeoin – Forklift Truck
    - John Safran – "Not the Sunscreen Song"
    - The Squirrel Grippers – Nine Inch Males

=== Fine Arts Awards ===
- Best Jazz Album
  - **Chaplin, Tinkler, Rex, Lamble – The Future in Today**
    - Joe Chindamo – Anyone Who Had a Heart
    - Kevin Hunt – Plays JS Bach
    - Shelley Scown with the Paul Grabowsky Trio – Angel
    - Rolf Stube – The Jazz Police
- Best Classical Album
  - **Yvonne Kenny, Paul Dyer, Australian Brandenburg Orchestra – Handel: Arias**
    - Tamara Anna Cislowska – The Persian Hours
    - Slava Grigoryan – Dance of the Angels
    - Karin Schaupp – Leyenda
    - Sydney Alpha Ensemble – Elena Kats-Chernin Clocks
- Best Children's Album
  - **The Wiggles – Toot Toot!**
    - The Flowerpot Gang - Happy Little Flower Pots
    - The Hooley Dooleys – Ready Set... Go!
    - George Spartels – Let's Go Out
    - Don Spencer – Australian Classics
- Best Original Soundtrack / Cast / Show Recording
  - **Original Cast Recording – The Boy from Oz**
    - The Necks – The Boys (Note: ARIA lists this entry as "The Boys for Necks - The".)
    - Cezary Skubiszewski – The Sound of One Hand Clapping
    - Various – A Little Bit of Soul
    - Various – To Hal and Bacharach
- Best World Music Album
  - **Kavisha Mazzella – Fisherman's Daughter**
    - Lisa Gerrard & Pieter Bourke – Duality
    - Matt Walker – I Listen to the Night
    - Tigramuna – Jazz Latino - Americano
    - Tulipan – Manic Celeste
    - Xylouris Ensemble – Antipodes

=== Artisan Awards ===
- Song of the Year
  - **The Whitlams – "No Aphrodisiac"**
    - Monique Brumby – "The Change in Me"
    - The Fauves – "Surf City Limits"
    - The Living End – "Prisoner of Society"
    - The Mavis's – "Cry"
- Producer of the Year
  - **Magoo, Regurgitator – Regurgitator – Unit**
    - Paul Begaud – Human Nature – Whisper Your Name
    - Daniel Denholm, Phil McKellar – The Cruel Sea – "Hard Times"
    - Charles Fisher – Savage Garden – "Universe"; – The Seekers – The Bush Girl
    - Rob Taylor, Tim Freedman – The Whitlams – Eternal Nightcap
- Engineer of the Year
  - **Magoo – Midnight Oil – "White Skin / Black Heart"; – Regurgitator – Unit; – Skunkhour – "Another Childish Man", "Breathing Through My Eyes", "Opportunist", "Pulse"**
  - **Nick Launay – Silverchair – "The Door"**
    - Nigel Derricks – Cordrazine – From Here to Wherever
    - Tony Espie – Wendy Matthews – Ghosts excluding "Halcyon Days"
    - Rob Taylor – The Whitlams – Eternal Nightcap
- Best Video
  - **Baz Luhrmann – Christine Anu, David Hobson, Royce Doherty – "Now Until the Break of Day"** (Note: ARIA lists Dave Dobson as one of three artists for "Now Until the Break of Day". Opera tenor, David Hobson is described as a 1998 ARIA Award winner.)
    - Chris Bently – Groove Terminator – "Losing Ground"
    - Mark Hartley – The Cruel Sea – "Takin' All Day"
    - Jeremy Hydnes, George Pinn – Regurgitator – "Polyester Girl"
    - Quan Yeomans – Regurgitator – "Black Bugs"
- Best Cover Art
  - **The Shits – Regurgitator – Unit** (Note: The Shits were a duo renamed as Happyland consisting of (then) domestic partners Quan Yeomans of Regurgitator and Janet English of Spiderbait.)
    - Carl Breitkreuz, Ian Downie – Various – To Hal and Bacharach
    - Dominic O'Brien, Matt Thomas, Rachel Boyce, Alison Smith – The Mavis's – Pink Pills
    - William Tennent, Chris Tennent – The Superjesus – Sumo
    - Kevin Wilkins – Midnight Oil – 20,000 Watt R.S.L.

== Outstanding Achievement Award ==
- Savage Garden

== ARIA Hall of Fame inductees ==
The Hall of Fame inductees were:

- The Angels
- The Masters Apprentices
