= Skeletons' Polka =

Studio album by Monique Brumby
- Released: 23 March 2010
- Recorded: Thirty Mill Studios
- Genre: Pop rock, Rock music
- Label: Monique Brumby
- Producer: Monique Brumby, Mark Opitz

Monique Brumby chronology
Into the Blue (2006)	Skeletons' Polka (2010)	Monique Brumby (2014)

Signal Hill is the fourth studio album by Australian singer songwriter, and ARIA Award winner, Monique Brumby. It was released physically and digitally in March 2010.

Brumby toured the album across Australia throughout 2010.

"They're Still Alive" was released as the lead single from the album in March 2010.

== Background and release ==
Brumby's previous album Into the Blue was released in 2006. Since then, Brumby produced Emily Davis' and Mosaik's debut albums, toured with The Bangles and mentored young musicians through The Push program. Brumby wrote and recorded 25 tracks for the album in which co-produced Mark Opitz culled down to 11.

Like past albums, Brumby drew on life experience for many of the tracks. She said "The opening track "Small Town" is about my relationship with growing up in Tasmania. “’Anchor’ is well... I feel like now I'm in that time of my life where I can give strength to people in my life cause I'm in a good place..” she continued, “There’s a song called "Bless That Girl" on the album. A friend of mine lost a sister to suicide and she gave me a tealight candle holder... and I went into the lounge room and lit a candle, sat down and started writing a song that was a tribute to her. So from the time I started writing it to the time I finished singing it – it was done – it was one of those songs that just poured out.”

== Track listings ==
1. "Small Town" - 4:07
2. "They're Still Alive" - 3:24
3. "Against the Wind" - 3:46
4. "Feels So Right" - 2:31
5. "Anchor" - 3:29
6. "China Doll" - 4:15
7. "Lika Diamonds" - 4:39
8. "Motorcade" - 3:14
9. "Beautiful Heart" - 3:55
10. "Valerie" - 4:52
11. "Bless That Girl" - 3:51
