= The Earthmen =

Australian musical group

- Origin: Melbourne, Victoria, Australia
- Genres: Indie, pop rock
- Years active: 1991–1999
- Labels: Summershine, Seed, Warner/East West
- Past members: Aaron Goldberg; Stephen Nash; Glen Peters; Eric Prentice; Scott Stevens; Nick Batterham; Ben Bleechmore; Robert Cooper; Stephen Moffatt; Matt Sigley; Craig Mitchell; Nick Murray

The Earthmen were an Australian indie pop rock band formed in Melbourne, Victoria. They released two albums, Teen Sensations and Love Walked In during their career (1991–1999). Love Walked In was nominated for ARIA Award for Breakthrough Artist – Album' at the ARIA Music Awards of 1997.

== History ==
=== 1991-1999: Success ===
The Earthmen was formed by Scott Stevens and Aaron Goldberg in 1991 as a jamming band in Melbourne, Victoria and were influenced by 1960s pop music and late '80s American and UK indie noise-pop.

After winning Triple J's national 'J-Sessions' competition they recorded their debut single, "Stacey's Cupboard" late that year with the line-up of Aaron Goldberg on guitar, Stephen Nash on guitar, Glen Peters on drums, Eric Prentice on bass guitar and Scott Stevens on vocals. Nash left in December and was replaced by Nick Batterham (ex-Blindside) as The Earthmen made their first live performances.

The "Stacey's Cupboard" single was released in April 1992 on the indie label, Summershine, as well as on the JJJ-fm compilation album the J sessions. Aside from Sydney band Glide, the Earthmen were the only band to make any industry impact from a pool of nearly 15 bands. Their second single, "Flyby" in August was followed by an Extended Play (EP), Flyby and a third single "Cool Chick #59" in October. They released another EP, Teen Sensations, in May 1993 on Summershine.

In April 1994 they released, "Figure 8" and by May, Peters was replaced by Ben Bleechmore and Prentice by Robert Cooper, The Earthmen had their last Summershine release, The Fall and Rise of My Favourite Sixties Girl EP.

Following their tour of the US and United Kingdom (UK) in July, Goldberg quit the band, and was replaced by Stephen Moffatt at the behest of the 'Black Pig' Publishing Group.

The band signed a contract with Warner's Australian label East West Records by early 1996. In Australia they released, "Scene Stealer" in April and "Hug Me Tighter" in August, then they entered the recording studio with Batterham and Stevens joined by Matt Sigley on bass guitar and keyboards and they used session drummer, Derek Yuen (Underground Lovers). By year's end they had recruited Craig Mitchell on drums and Nick Murray on guitar.

"Whoever's Been Using This Bed" was released as a single in January 1997 with Love Walked In following in April. The album was nominated for ARIA Award for Breakthrough Artist – Album at the ARIA Music Awards of 1997. It spawned two more singles, "Coloured In" and "Love Walks In".

The Earthmen covered Hal David and Burt Bacharach's "I Just Don't Know What to Do with Myself" for a tribute album, To Hal and Bacharach in April 1998. The War Against Rock and Roll EP, was released in December 1998, with their final gig following on 12 February 1999.

=== 2014-present: Reformation ===
In 2014 the band announced plans to release a retrospective compilation album on the Popboomerang Records label. At the time of the band's demise, they had been writing songs towards their second album for Warners. The band broke up during the first recording session and many of the songs never got past the demo stage. In looking back through all their material for this retrospective, these demos were uncovered and judged to be worth inclusion. The band got together in late 2014 and recorded four new tracks with the album "College Heart" to be released in September 2016.

== Members ==
- Stephen Nash – guitar (1991)
- Glen Peters – drums (1991–1993)
- Eric Prentice – bass guitar (1991–1993)
- Aaron Goldberg – guitar (1991–1994)
- Scott Stevens – vocals (1991–1999)
- Nick Batterham – guitar (1991–1999)
- Ben Bleechmore – drums (1994–1996)
- Robert Cooper – bass guitar (1993–1996)
- Stephen Moffatt – guitar (1995)
- Matt Sigley – bass guitar, keyboards (1996–1999)
- Derek Yuen – drums (1996 recording sessions)
- Craig Mitchell – drums (1996–1999)
- Nick Murray – guitar, organ (1996–1999)

== Discography ==
=== Studio albums ===
Title	Details	Peak chart positions
Title	Details	AUS
Love Walked In	Released: April 1997; Label: Summertime/ EastWest (0630169972); Format: CD	78
College Heart	Released: September 2016; Label: Popboomerang Records (); Format: CD, LP, Digital	-
Periscope	Released: January 2021; Label: Sound as Ever (SAE 003); Format: CD, LP, Digital	-

=== Extended plays ===
Title	Details	Peak chart positions
Title	Details	US CMJ
Flyby	Released: 1992; Label: Summertime (SHINE 24); Format: CD, LP	-
Teen Sensations	Released: 1992; Label: Summertime (SHINECD 5); Format: CD, LP	80
The Fall and Rise of My Favourite Sixties Girl	Released: 1993; Label: Summertime (SHINE44CD); Format: CD, LP	-
The War Against Rock and Roll	Released: 1998; Label: Shock (EARTH001); Format: CD	-

=== Singles ===
Year	Title	Peak chart positions	Album
Year	Title	AUS	Album
1992	"Stacey's Cupboard"	—	Flyby
1992	"Flyby"	—	Flyby
1992	"Cool Chick No.59"	—	Teen Sensations
1994	"Figure 8"/"Tell The Women We're Going"	—	The Fall and Rise of My Favourite Sixties Girl
1996	"Scene Stealer"	—	
1996	"Hug Me Tighter"	—	Love Walked In
1997	"Whoever's Been Using this Bed"	85	Love Walked In
1997	"Coloured In"	—	Love Walked In
1997	"Love Walks In"	—	Love Walked In

== Awards and nominations ==
=== ARIA Music Awards ===
The ARIA Music Awards is an annual awards ceremony that recognises excellence, innovation, and achievement across all genres of Australian music. They commenced in 1987.

Year	Nominee / work	Award	Result	Ref.
1997	Love Walked In	Breakthrough Artist - Album	Nominated	
