= Don Burrows =

Australian jazz musician (1928–2020)

- Don Burrows at the ABC in 1959

Background information
- Born: Donald Vernon Burrows; 8 August 1928; Marrickville, Sydney, Australia
- Died: 12 March 2020 (aged 91) Terrey Hills, Sydney
- Genre: Jazz
- Occupation: Musician
- Instruments: Clarinet, saxophone, flute
- Years active: 1942–2005
- Labels: Columbia Records, WEA, Polygram

Donald Vernon Burrows AO MBE (8 August 1928 – 12 March 2020) was an Australian jazz and swing musician who played clarinet, saxophone and flute.

== Life and career ==
Donald Vernon Burrows was born on 8 August 1928, the only child of Vernon and Beryl and attended Bondi Public School. In 1937 a visiting flutist and teacher (Victor McMahon) inspired him to start learning the flute. He began on a B-flat flute which he later played at Carnegie Hall and the Newport Jazz Festival. By 1940 he was captain of the Metropolitan Schools Flute Band and began entering talent quests.

By 1942, aged 14, Burrows had begun playing clarinet and quit school. He began appearing at Sydney jazz clubs, and appeared on The Youth Show, a Macquarie Radio show. In 1944 he was invited to play and record with George Trevare's Australians. He became well known in Sydney jazz circles and was performing in dance halls, nightclubs and radio bands. He was a member of Jim Gussey's ABC Dance Band for five years.

During the 1960s and 1970s Burrows had many engagements in Australia and the United States, including six years performing at the Wentworth Hotel in Sydney in quartets with Ed Gaston, George Golla, and various drummers. It was this association which made his name the "most familiar in Australian jazz". In 1972, he was invited to perform at the Montreux Jazz Festival and later the Newport Jazz Festival.

The year 1973 was a watershed for Burrows as he received the first gold record for an Australian jazz musician for his record Just the Beginning, instigated the first jazz studies program in the southern hemisphere, at the New South Wales Conservatorium of Music (under the direction of Rex Hobcroft) and was appointed a Member of the Order of the British Empire (MBE). In 1979 he was appointed Chair of Jazz Studies at the conservatorium.

Burrows performed to mostly classical music audiences through tours with Musica Viva and the Australian Broadcasting Corporation concert series. He led the nationally televised show The Don Burrows Collection for six years. He had an extensive recording career with his groups and performed on albums by others.

In the 1980s Burrows mentored and was closely associated with James Morrison. He formed the Don Burrows Quartet with George Golla (guitar), Ed Gaston (double bass) and Alan Turnbull (drums). He also worked with Frank Sinatra, Dizzy Gillespie, Nat King Cole, Oscar Peterson, Tony Bennett, Stéphane Grappelli, Cleo Laine, and the Sydney Symphony Orchestra.

In 1981 Burrows played woodwind on a Play School album, Hey Diddle Diddle: it was his only involvement with the show.

In 2005 Burrows toured with a small band that included the Australian jazz pianist Kevin Hunt. He used his photographic images with his music in a show called Stop, Look and Listen.

Burrows had arthritis from age 38. In a 2008 interview with the Australian Broadcasting Corporation's Andrew Ford, celebrating his 80th birthday, he said that "arthritis is not the greatest for playing a musical instrument. But playing a musical instrument is very, very good for arthritis". In later years he had Alzheimer's disease and lived in a nursing home in northern Sydney. He died on 12 March 2020, aged 91.

== Awards and honours ==
- 1973: Member of the Order of the British Empire (MBE)
- 1987: Officer of the Order of Australia (AO)
- 1988: Life member of the New South Wales Conservatorium of Music
- 1989: Named one of the Australian Living Treasures
- 2000: Honorary Doctorate in Music, Sydney University
- 2001: Honorary Doctorate in Music, Edith Cowan University, Perth

=== APRA Awards ===
The APRA Awards are held in Australia and New Zealand by the Australasian Performing Right Association to recognise songwriting skills, sales and airplay performance by its members annually.

Year	Nominee / work	Award	Result
2004	Don Burrows	Ted Albert Award for Outstanding Services to Australian Music	inducted

=== ARIA Awards ===
The ARIA Music Awards is an annual awards ceremony that recognises excellence, innovation, and achievement across all genres of Australian music. It commenced in 1987.

Year	Nominee / work	Award	Result	Ref.
1988	Nice 'n' Easy (with Adelaide Connection)	Best Jazz Album	Nominated	
1991	Don Burrows	ARIA Hall of Fame	inducted	
2006	Non Stop Flight – Great Music of the Swing Era (with The Mell-O-Tones & Phillip Sametz)	Best Jazz Album	Nominated	
2016	In Good Company (with James Morrison)	Best Jazz Album	Nominated	

=== Australian Jazz Bell Awards ===
The Australian Jazz Bell Awards recognised the talent and achievements of Australian jazz artists locally and internationally

Year	Nominee / work	Award	Result
2008	Don Burrows	Australian Jazz Bell Hall of Fame	inducted

=== Bernard Heinze Memorial Award ===
The Sir Bernard Heinze Memorial Award is given to a person who has made an outstanding contribution to music in Australia.

Year	Nominee / work	Award	Result	Ref.
1999	Don Burrows	Sir Bernard Heinze Memorial Award	awarded	

=== Mo Awards ===
The Australian Entertainment Mo Awards (commonly known informally as the Mo Awards), were annual Australian entertainment industry awards. They recognise achievements in live entertainment in Australia from 1975 to 2016. Don Burrows won one award in that time.

Year	Nominee / work	Award	Result (wins only)
1992	Don Burrows	John Campbell Fellowship Award	Won

== Discography ==
=== Albums ===
List of albums, with Australian chart positions
Title	Album details	Peak chart positions
Title	Album details	AUS
On Camera (as Don Burrows Plus Six)	Released: 1963; Format: LP; Label: Columbia (SCXO-7692)	—N/a
A Tribute to Freddy Gardner	Released: 1966; Format: LP; Label: Columbia (SCXO-7777)	—N/a
The Jazz Sound of the Don Burrows Quartet (as Don Burrows Plus Six)	Released: 1966; Format: LP; Label: Columbia (SCXO 7781)	—N/a
2000 Weeks	Released: 1969; Format: LP; Label: Columbia (SCXO 7883); NB: Soundtrack to the film 2000 Weeks	—N/a
Just the Beginning (as The Don Burrows Quartet)	Released: 1971; Format: LP; Label: Cherry Pie (CPS-1009)	–
Live! at Montreaux (as The Don Burrows Quartet)	Released: 1972; Format: LP; Label: Cherry Pie (CPS-1010)	–
At The Sydney Opera House (as The Don Burrows Quartet)	Released: 1974; Format: LP; Label: Cherry Pie (CPS 1017)	–
Duo (with George Golla)	Released: 1975; Format: LP; Label: Cherry Pie (CPS 1021)	98
The New Don Burrows Quintet (as The New Don Burrows Quintet)	Released: 1975; Format: LP; Label: Cherry Pie (CPF 1023)	–
The Tasman Connection	Released: 1976; Format: LP; Label: Cherry Pie (CPF 1026)	–
St James (with Galapagos Duck)	Released: 1976; Format: LP; Label: 44 Records (6357704)	–
Steph 'n' Us (with George Golla and Stephane Grappelli)	Released: 1977; Format: LP, Cassette; Label: Cherry Pie (CPF 1032)	38
Don Burrows and the Brazilian Connection (with The Brazilian Connection)	Released: 1978; Format: 2xLP; Label: Cherry Pie (CPF 1035)	92
Cool Yule	Released: 1978; Format: LP; Label: Cherry Pie (CPF 1037)	–
Back in Town (with Don Andrews, Andy Brown and Alan Turnbull)	Released: 1979; Format: LP; Label: 44 Records (6357722)	–
Other Places Other Times (with George Golla Duo)	Released: 1980; Format: LP, Cassette; Label: Cherry Pie (CPF 1043)	38
Don Burrows with Neil Thurgate Orchestra (with Neil Thurgate Orchestra)	Released: 1980; Format: LP, Cassette; Label: ABC (ABC LPX 0005)	–
Bonfa Burrows Brazil (with Luiz Bonfá and George Golla)	Released: 1980; Format: LP, Cassette; Label: Cherry Pie (CPF 1045)	–
Other Places Other Times (with Luiz Bonfá and George Golla)	Released: 1981; Format: LP, Cassette; Label: Cherry Pie (L 37654)	–
This Time Tassie (with George Golla Duo)	Released: 1981; Format: 2xLP; Label: Cherry Pie (L 70201)	–
Sara Dane	Released: 1982; Format: LP Cassette; Label: Cherry Pie (LD 37856); NB: Music Inspired By the Series Sara Dane	86
Fluteman (John Sangster with Don Borrows)	Released: 1982; Format: LP Cassette; Label: Rain-Forest (RFLP-006); NB: Soundtrack to the film Fluteman	–
A Retrospective (as Burrows' Jazz Brothers)	Released: 1982; Format: LP Cassette; Label: ABC (ABCL 8207)	–
Burrows at the Winery	Released: 1984; Format: LP Cassette; Label: ABC (L 38161)	–
Makin' Whoopee! (with The Adelaide Connection)	Released: September 1985; Format: LP, Cassette; Label: ABC (L 38321)	–
Jazz at The Opera House (as The Don Burrows Quintet with The Australian Vocal Ensemble & The Chris Hinze Combination)	Released: 1985; Format: LP, Cassette; Label: ABC (L 38402)	–
Flute Salad (with Chris Hinze)	Released: 1986; Format: LP, Cassette; Label: ABC (L 38418)	–
Nice 'n' Easy (as The Don Burrows Quintet with The Adelaide Connection)	Released: 1987; Format: CD, Cassette; Label: ABC (L 38754)	–
With Orchestra (as The Don Burrows Quintet)	Released: 1990; Format: CD, Cassette; Label: WEA (903172626-2)	–
Quintet (as The Don Burrows Quintet)	Released: 1990; Format: CD, Cassette; Label: WEA (903172627-2)	–
Duets (as The Don Burrows Quintet)	Released: 1990; Format: CD, Cassette; Label: WEA (903172628-1)	–
Together at Last (with Julie Anthony)	Released: 1994; Format: CD, Cassette; Label: Castle Communications (CTVCD 1001)	–
In Flight (Marilane with Don Burrows)	Released: 1999; Format: CD, Cassette; Label: MDM (MDM 01 CD)	–
Bob Barnard's Jazz Party 2004 (Bob Barnard)	Released: 2005; Format: CD; Label: Nif Nuf Jazz Recordings (43/021)	–
Eye to Eye Vol 1+2 (Kevin Hunt)	Released: June 2007; Format: 2×CD	–
In Good Company (with James Morrison)	Released: 2015; Format: CD; Label: ABC Jazz	–

=== Compilations ===
Title	Album details
The Babinda Trilogy	Released: 1990; Format: 3xLP; Label: WEA (903172628-1); Features Quintet & With Orchestra & Duets
The First 50 Years: Volume One (1944–1965)	Released: 1992; Format: CD; Label: ABC, Polygram (514296-2)
The First 50 Years: Volume Two (1967–1976)	Released: 1993; Format: CD; Label: ABC, Polygram (514297-2)
The First 50 Years: Volume Three (1977–1979)	Released: 1993; Format: CD; Label: ABC, Polygram (514298-2)
The First 50 Years: Volume Four (1980–1984)	Released: 1993; Format: CD; Label: ABC, Polygram (514299-2)
The First 50 Years: Volume Five (1985–1992)	Released: 1993; Format: CD; Label: ABC, Polygram (514300-2)
Non-Stop Flight: Great Music of the Swing Era (with The Mell-O-Tones)	Released: 2005; Format: 2XCD; Label: ABC Jazz (ABC 982 9885)
