= Time to Leave (EP) =

EP by Cordrazine
- Released: May 1997
- Label: Rubber Records

Cordrazine chronology
Time to Leave (1997)	From Here to Wherever (1998)

Singles from Time to Leave
- 1. "Crazy" Released: 1997

Time to Leave is the debut extended play by Australian rock band, Cordrazine. The EP peaked at number 42 on the ARIA charts.

The EP was re-released on vinyl in August 2020.

== Track listing ==
1. "Crazy" - 4:04
2. "Time to Leave" - 3:30
3. "Uncle Joe's Lament" - 5:41
4. "14" - 4:48

== Charts ==
Chart (1997)	Peak position
Australia (ARIA)	42

== Release history ==
Region	Date	Format	Label	Catalogue
Australia	May 1997	CD	Rubber Records	RUB063
Australia	28 August 2020	12" LP	Rubber Records	RUB332V
