= Monique Brumby (album) =

Studio album by Monique Brumby
- Released: 27 January 2014
- Label: Monique Brumby
- Producers: Monique Brumby, Nick Larkins

Monique Brumby chronology
Skeletons' Polka (2010)	Monique Brumby (2014)

Monique Brumby is the self-titled fifth studio album by Australian singer songwriter, and ARIA Award winner, Monique Brumby. It was released physically and digitally in January 2014.

Brumby toured the album across Australia throughout 2014.

== Background and release ==
Since the release of 2010's Skeletons' Polka, Brumby became the creative director for Aardvark, a not-for-profit community organisation that provides a music program for young people with chronic illness, working alongside Gotye. Brumby told the Sydney Morning Herald “That was the turning point for me, now working with youth seems to follow me around. It feels really great to be able to help young people because I realise that I needed that when I was their age. My relationship with music is now vastly different. I’m much more confident with expressing my music. I don’t really think that I came into my full understanding of that till my mid 30s.” Brumby reflected saying she is now simply being herself, hence the album's self-titled.

Brumby said the album took three years to make and she said out of all of her albums, she is most proud of this one. She said "The songs reflect my feelings around being an outsider, wanting to build a sense of community in a world that can be isolating for so many. Songs about the human condition, the folly of youth and overcoming adversity." She said her favourite track on the album is "In This Game", "...an electro track about lost highways and trying to stay awake at the wheel of your own life." She said "The single 'Silent War' is a love song that happens to be about the union between two women. It reflects my views on the status of marriage equality in Australia, and that I would really like to see same sex couples recognised under the marriage act."

== Reviews ==
Meg Crawford of Beat Magazine called the album "Splendid" saying; "This is a beautiful collection of tracks, all delivered in Monique Brumby’s unmistakably glorious, unique voice – covering love, loss and the stuff of other human problems. It’s paying definite homage to the ‘80s. While earlier releases were more in your alt-country/pop/rock vein, this is almost exclusively ‘80s driven synth/electro pop, overlaid with her beautiful voice. It’s different, but it’s good different. "

Haydn Levette of Pearl HQ said; "The self-titled effort sees Brumby reach exciting new heights. It’s creative, raw and full of passion. The fact that the better half of the album was recorded in the spare room of her Melbourne house, using a make-shift [sic] vocal booth, really allows you to appreciate the lengths she’s gone to and the final product. This album has so much more to give than just its production quality. The music is soothing in a way. Each song has its own voice, holding its own against a raft of exciting material."

== Track listings ==
1. "Silent War" - 4:15
2. "For You April" - 3:11
3. "Hang on Babe" - 3:52
4. "In This Game" - 3:46
5. "Dragonfly" - 3:33
6. "Quicksilver" - 4:50
7. "Forever Gone" - 3:21
8. "All the Ways" - 4:00
9. "The Crown" - 3:01
10. "Underground" - 3:39

== Singles ==
- "Underground" was released as the first single in April 2011.
- "All the Ways" was released in December 2013.
- "Silent War" was released as the third and final single in May 2014.
