= Mary (Monique Brumby song) =

Single by Monique Brumby

from the album Thylacine
- A-side: "Mary"
- Released: September 1996
- Genre: Rock music
- Label: Sony Music Australia
- Songwriter(s): Monique Brumby
- Producer(s): David Birdie

Monique Brumby singles chronology
"Fool for You" (1996)	"Mary" (1996)	"The Change in Me" (1997)

"Mary" is a song by Australian singer songwriter Monique Brumby. It was released in September 1996 as the second single for her debut studio album, Thylacine (1997).

At the ARIA Music Awards of 1997, the track was nominated for two awards. It won 'Best Female Artist'. David Bridie lost out for 'Producer of the Year' to Charles Fisher

== Track listing ==
1. "Mary"
2. "Nothing's Ever The Way You Think It's Gonna Be"
3. "That's Me"
4. "Fool For You" (Acoustic Version)
5. "Mary" (Acoustic Version)
