= Losing Ground (song) =

Single by Groove Terminator

from the album Road Kill
- Released: 1997
- Recorded: 1997
- Studio: The Doghouse, Sydney, Australia
- Length: 3:27
- Label: Virgin
- Songwriter(s): Simon Lewicki
- Producer(s): Simon Lewicki; Noel Burgess

Groove Terminator singles chronology
"It's On" (1996)	"Losing Ground" (1997)	"Here Comes Another One" (1999)

"Losing Ground" is a song by Australian electronic music group, Groove Terminator. It was released in 1997 on 12" vinyl and in May 1998 on CD single. A remixed version is included on the band's debut studio album Road Kill. The song peaked at number 64 on the Australian ARIA Charts.

At the ARIA Music Awards of 1998, the song was nominated for Best New Talent and Best Video (Chris Bently).

== Track listings ==
12" Vinyl (Interdance – ID 005)

1. "Losing Ground" (Original mix) - 5:52
2. "Losing Ground" (Johnny Lisbon remix) - 6:05
3. "Losing Ground" (Coursey & Duane's Mirrorball remix) - 8:05
4. "Losing Ground" (Code Warrior remix) - 6:27

CD single (Interdance – 724388518420)

1. "Losing Ground" (Radio edit) - 3:27
2. "Losing Ground" (Original mix) - 5:52
3. "Losing Ground" (Coursey & Duane's Mirrorball remix) - 8:05
4. "Losing Ground" (Johnny Lisbon remix) - 6:05
5. "Losing Ground" (Code Warrior remix) - 6:27

== Charts ==
Chart (1998)	Peak position
Australia Singles (ARIA)	64
