= Tania Bowra =

Australian musician and songwriter

- Origin: Sydney
- Genres: Pop

Tania Bowra is an Australian musician and songwriter. She released her debut album Heaven and Earth in October 1989 which was nominated for the 1990 ARIA Award for Best New Talent.

== Discography ==
=== Albums ===
List of albums, with selected chart positions
Title	Album details	Peak chart positions
Title	Album details	AUS
Heaven and Earth	Released: October 1989; Label: ABC (838414-1); Format: Vinyl, CD	109
Tania Bowra	Released: 1996; Label: Tania Bowra (TB500CD); Format: CD	—
Place in the Sun	Released: 2004; Label: Craving Records (TB003); Format: CD	—

=== Singles ===
Title	Year	Peak chart positions	Album
Title	Year	AUS	Album
"Heaven and Earth"	1989	98	Heaven and Earth
"No Proposition"	1990	-	Heaven and Earth

== Awards and nominations ==
=== ARIA Music Awards ===
The ARIA Music Awards is an annual awards ceremony that recognises excellence, innovation, and achievement across all genres of Australian music. They commenced in 1987.

Year	Nominee / work	Award	Result	Ref.
1990	Heaven and Earth	Best New Talent	Nominated	
