= Tonite Only =

- Origin: Sydney, New South Wales, Australia
- Genres: Electronic
- Years active: 2005–present
- Labels: Ministry of Sound Australia
- Members: Sam Littlemore; Simon Lewicki
- Website: www.facebook.com/toniteonlymusic

Tonite Only are an electronic music group formed late 2005 in Sydney, Australia, which disbanded late 2006, only to reform a few years later. Its two members are Sam Littlemore (Sam La More) and Simon Lewicki (Groove Terminator), leading proponents in the Australian electronic music scene.

In 2006, the duo released "Danger (The Bomb)" and "Where the Party's At" and soon after announced that they would separate and focus on their respective solo careers.

In 2006, they also remixed Sneaky Sound System's track Pictures which peaked at number one on the ARIA Club Tracks Chart for a record-equaling thirteen weeks.

In 2008, the pair reunited to remix (Ministry of Sound label-mate) Hook n Sling's "The Best Thing", a cover of the 1980s Boom Crash Opera song.

In 2011 they resumed production together and released the single, "We Run the Nite" which peaked at number 42 in the Australian pop charts.

== Discography ==
=== Singles ===
List of singles as lead artist
Title	Year	Peak chart positions
Title	Year	AUS
"Danger (The Bomb)"	2006	–
"Where the Party's At"	2006	–
"We Run the Night"	2011	42
"Haters Gonna Hate"	2011	–
"Go"	2012	–
"Experience" feat. Nathan Hudson	2014	–

== Awards ==
=== AIR Awards ===
The Australian Independent Record Awards (commonly known informally as AIR Awards) is an annual awards night to recognise, promote and celebrate the success of Australia's Independent Music sector.

Year	Nominee / work	Award	Result
2011	"We Run the Night"	Best Independent Dance/Electronic or Club Song or EP	Nominated
2012	"Go"	Best Independent Dance/Electronic or Club Song or EP	Nominated
