= To Hal and Bacharach =

1998 tribute album to Bacharach & David

Studio album by Various
- Released: 20 April 1998
- Genre: Easy listening
- Label: Warner/WEA
- Producer: Kurt Luthy, Christa Mitchell, Melissa Whebell

To Hal and Bacharach is a 1998 tribute album featuring songs written by Hal David and Burt Bacharach covered by Australian artists. The idea, developed by Kurt Luthy, Christa Mitchell and Melissa Whebell, was to have a number of Australian performers cover various David/Bacharach tunes, among them: Regurgitator, Rebecca's Empire, the Whitlams, Tex Perkins, the Avalanches, Dave Graney and Frank Bennett

At the ARIA Music Awards of 1998 the soundtrack was nominated for Best Original Soundtrack, Cast or Show Album.

Bacharach has had his songs recorded by many artists. The track listing gives the original artist as well as the covering artist. It also includes timings

== Track listing ==
Track	Title	Covering Artist	First Recorded by	Track Length
1	Always Something There to Remind Me	Rebecca's Empire	Lou Johnson	4:28
2	Walk On By	The Mavis's	Dionne Warwick	3:15
3	This Girl's in Love with You	Leonardo's Bride	Herb Alpert & the Tijuana Brass	4:48
4	Trains and Boats and Planes	The Dumb Earth	Billy J. Kramer with The Dakotas	3:23
5	The Look of Love	Lisa Miller & Tex Perkins	Dusty Springfield	4:22
6	Raindrops Keep Falling on My Head	Cordrazine	B.J. Thomas	3:42
7	What's New Pussycat	Frank Bennett	Tom Jones	2:11
8	I'll Never Fall in Love Again	The Whitlams	Jerry Orbach	3:38
9	(The Man Who Shot) Liberty Valance	Regurgitator	Gene Pitney	2:18
10	Do You Know the Way to San Jose	The Avalanches	Dionne Warwick	5:00
11	Anyone Who Had a Heart	Kim Salmon and The Surrealists	Dionne Warwick	2:58
12	Twenty Four Hours From Tulsa	Chris Wilson	Gene Pitney	4:43
13	Wives and Lovers	Kiley Gaffney	Jack Jones	2:56
14	I Just Don't Know What to Do with Myself	The Earthmen	Tommy Hunt	4:47
15	Make It Easy on Yourself	The Blackeyed Susans	Jerry Butler	4:39
16	(They Long to Be) Close to You	Billy Baxter	Richard Chamberlain	4:22
17	You'll Never Get to Heaven (If You Break My Heart)	Kiva	Dionne Warwick	3:42
18	What the World Needs Now (Is Love)	Dave Graney and Clare Moore vs Dirty Three	Jackie DeShannon	4:24
