= From Here to Wherever =

Studio album by Cordrazine
- Released: April 1998
- Length: 39:51
- Label: Rubber Records
- Producer: Cordrazine, Nigel Derricks

Cordrazine chronology
Time to Leave (1997)	From Here to Wherever (1998)	Always Coming Down (2010)

Singles from From Here to Wherever
- 1. "Clearlight" Released: August 1997; 2. "Memorial Drive" Released: February 1998; 3. "I Never Cared Before" Released: 1998

From Here to Wherever is the debut studio album by Australian rock band, Cordrazine. The album debuted and peaked at number 9 on the ARIA charts.

The album was nominated for two ARIA Awards at the ARIA Music Awards of 1998.

The album was re-released on vinyl in August 2020.

== Track listing ==
1. "Clearlight" - 4:20
2. "Red Bull" - 1:54
3. "Memorial Drive" - 3:37
4. "Your Kingdom Will Fall" - 2:58
5. "I Never Cared Before" - 5:25
6. "Crazy" - 4:37
7. "Spain" - 4:45
8. "Suddenly in Blue" - 3:43
9. "Ever After" - 2:43
10. "Untitled" - 5:50

== Charts ==
Chart (1998)	Peak position
Australian Albums (ARIA)	9

== Release history ==
Region	Date	Format	Label	Catalogue
Australia	April 1998	CD	Rubber Records	74321566382
Australia	28 August 2020	LP	Rubber Records	RUB331V
