= Marie Wilson (Australian singer) =

Australian singer and songwriter (born 1974)

- Born: 20 April 1974 (age 52); Melbourne, Victoria, Australia
- Genres: Pop rock; rock
- Occupations: Singer; songwriter
- Instrument: Vocals
- Years active: 1992–present
- Labels: East West, Warner Music Australia

Marie Wilson (born 20 April 1974) is an Australian singer and songwriter. She was nominated for Best New Talent and Breakthrough Artist – Single at the ARIA Music Awards of 1998 and for Breakthrough Artist – Album at the ARIA Music Awards of 1999.

== Career ==
Born in Melbourne, Wilson started playing solo gigs in 1993. She had a series of independent releases before signing with Warner Music in 1997.

In 1998 she released two singles, "Next Time" and "Won't Keep a Good Girl Down", both of which made the ARIA top 40. An album Real Life was released in October 1998 and reached #7 on the albums chart.

Real Life was subsequently released in USA in June 1999.

In 2000, Wilson covered "Me Myself I" which was the lead song on the movie Me Myself I. She released two more albums, Studio Sessions in 2001 and Heartbreak in 2005, then took a break from music. She later made her return, releasing a song "Extraordinary" in 2013 and followed it up the next year with an album of the same name.

== Discography ==
=== Studio albums ===
List of studio albums, with selected details and chart positions
Title	Album details	Peak chart positions
Title	Album details	AUS
Real Life	Released: October 1999; Formats: CD, cassette; Label: East West	7
Studio Sessions	Released: June 2002; Formats: CD; Label: Self-release	—
Heartbreak	Released: 14 March 2004; Formats: CD; Label: Self-release	—
The Magic of Hoagy Carmichael (with Kevin Hunt)	Released: April 2004; Label: Marie Wilson and Kevin Hunt (MWKH2002)	—
Studio Sessions 2	Released: 5 August 2012; Formats: CD, digital download; Label: Self-release	—
Extraordinary	Released: 9 May 2014; Formats: CD, digital download; Label: Self-release	—
"—" denotes releases that did not chart or were not released in that territory.

=== Live albums ===
List of live albums, with selected details
Title	Album details
Live in Melbourne	Released: 5 November 2012; Formats: CD, digital download; Label: Self-release

=== Extended plays ===
List of extended plays, with selected details
Title	EP details
Marie Wilson	Released: 2 December 1992; Formats: CD; Label: Self-release
Temptation	Released: 24 August 1996; Formats: CD; Label: Self-release

=== Singles ===
List of singles, with selected chart positions
Title	Year	Peak chart positions	Album
Title	Year	AUS	Album
"Next Time"	1998	21	Real Life
"Won't Keep a Good Girl Down"	1998	31	Real Life
"Rescue Me"	1998	—	Real Life
"Never Going that Way Again"	1999	—	Non-album single
"Me Myself I"	2000	76	Me Myself I
"Another Night"	2002	—	Studio Sessions
"Hold On"	2002	—	Studio Sessions
"Stay Away"	2004	—	Heartbreak
"Can I See You Tomorrow"	2004	—	Heartbreak
"Annie's Song"	2012	—	Studio Sessions 2
"I Don't Mind"	2014	—	Extraordinary
"Free"	2014	—	Extraordinary
"Song4MS (Shine)"	2017	—	Non-album single

== Awards and nominations ==
=== ARIA Awards ===
The ARIA Music Awards are presented annually from 1987 by the Australian Recording Industry Association (ARIA).

Year	Nominee / work	Award	Result
1998	"Next Time"	Best New Talent	Nominated
1998	"Next Time"	Breakthrough Artist – Single	Nominated
1999	Real Life	Breakthrough Artist - Album	Nominated

=== Mo Awards ===
The Australian Entertainment Mo Awards (commonly known informally as the Mo Awards), were annual Australian entertainment industry awards. They recognise achievements in live entertainment in Australia from 1975 to 2016. Marie Wilson won three awards in that time.

Year	Nominee / work	Award	Result (wins only)
1994	Marie Wilson	Jazz Vocal Performer of the Year	Won
1998	Marie Wilson	Jazz Vocal Performer of the Year	Won
2001	Marie Wilson	Jazz Vocal Performer of the Year	Won
