= Hamish (band) =

- Origin: Melbourne, Australia
- Years active: 2001 - 2003

Hamish is an Australian band made up of singer Hamish Cowan (Cordrazine) and producer Bryan St James. Their single "Life Song" reached the top 100 on Australia's ARIA singles chart.

They released their debut album, Homesick, in 2002 to mixed reviews. Writing in the Sunday Herald Sun Graeme Hammond called it "a record of exquisite harmony and balance". Emma Chalmers of the Courier Mail gave it 3 stars calling it "a quite delicate album that beautifully combines emotional melody with techno beats". The Herald Sun's Peter Holmes gave it 7/10 writing "At times the wispy electronic arrangements sit perfectly, yet elsewhere they lack the required drama." Annika Priest of Perth's Sunday Times called it "Slightly morbid, often wishy-washy".

== Members ==
- Hamish Cowan (vocals)
- Bryan St James (keyboards)

== Discography ==
List of albums, with selected details
Title	Details
Homesick	Released: October 2002; Format: CD, 2×CD; Label: Rubber Records, BMG (74321959732)

=== Singles ===
List of singles, with selected chart positions
Title	Year	Peak chart positions	Album
Title	Year	AUS	Album
"Forever and Never"	2002	—	Homesick
"Life Song"	2002	96	Homesick
"4 Your Love"	2003	—	Homesick
