= Real Life (Marie Wilson album) =

Studio album by Marie Wilson
- Released: October 1998
- Label: EastWest, Warner
- Producer: Joe Hardy

Marie Wilson chronology
Temptation (1996)	Real Life (1998)	Studio Sessions (2002)

Singles from Real Life
- 1. "Next Time" Released: March 1998; 2. "Won't Keep a Good Girl Down" Released: July 1998; 3. "Rescue Me" Released: 1998

Real Life is the debut studio album by Australian singer and songwriter, Marie Wilson. It was released in October 1998, peaking at number 7 on the ARIA Charts.

At the ARIA Music Awards of 1999, the album was nominated for Breakthrough Artist – Album.

== Critical reception ==
Professional ratings
Review scores
Source	Rating
AllMusic	3/5 stars

Heather Phares from AllMusic said "[Wilson's] passionate vocals and lyrics lend themselves to unvarnished acoustic numbers as well as straight-ahead rock, with samples and loops mixed in for good measure."

== Track listing ==
1. "Won't Keep a Good Girl Down" - 3:25
2. "Next Time" - 4:24
3. "Real Life" - 3:48
4. "Making It Up As I Go Along" - 4:13
5. "On My Own" - 4:25
6. "Rescue Me" - 3:49
7. "Without My Lover" - 5:17
8. "Ordinary Girl" - 3:16
9. "Take Me As I Am" - 4:05
10. "Impossible" - 4:18
11. "Runaway" - 4:31

== Charts ==
Chart (1998)	Peak position
Australian Albums (ARIA)	7
