= Adelaide Connection =

Australian vocal jazz ensemble

- Origin: Adelaide
- Genres: Jazz
- Years active: 1981–
- Labels: ABC Records

Adelaide Connection is an Australian vocal jazz ensemble from the Elder Conservatorium of Music in Adelaide, South Australia. Their album with the Don Burrows Quintet, Nice 'n' Easy, was nominated for the 1988 ARIA Award for Best Jazz Album.

Musical directors have included John McKenzie, Connaitre Miller, Luke Thompson and Anita Wardle.

== Discography ==
=== Albums ===
List of albums, with details
Title	Album details
Makin' Whoopee! (with Don Burrows)	Released: September 1985; Format: LP, Cassette; Label: ABC (L 38321)
Nice 'n' Easy (with The Don Burrows Quintet)	Released: 1987; Format: CD, Cassette; Label: ABC (L 38754)
Gotcha	Released: 1991; Format: CD; Label: University of Adelaide Foundation
Nature Boy	Released: 1999; Format: CD; Label: University of Adelaide Foundation

== Awards and nominations ==
=== ARIA Awards ===
The ARIA Music Awards is an annual awards ceremony that recognises excellence, innovation, and achievement across all genres of Australian music. It commenced in 1987.

Year	Nominee / work	Award	Result	Ref.
1988	Nice 'n' Easy (with Don Burrows)	Best Jazz Album	Nominated	
