= Frank Bennett (singer) =

- Birth name: David Henry Wray
- Also known as: Tony Sinatra, Rudi Zarsoff
- Born: 20 June 1959 (age 66); Sydney, New South Wales, Australia
- Genres: Swing; lounge; jazz; rhythm and blues
- Occupations: Singer; musician; songwriter
- Instruments: Saxophone; vocals; guitar
- Years active: 1979–present
- Labels: Mercury; Universal; EMI; Capitol

David Henry Wray (born 20 June 1959) is an Australian jazz singer, musician and songwriter who performs under the stage name Frank Bennett, a blend of Frank Sinatra and Tony Bennett. His vocal style is influenced by those two singers and the music of the 1940s and 1950s. He has provided alternative rock cover versions of rock and pop singles in big band arrangements: "Creep" (originally by Radiohead), "Better Man" (Pearl Jam), "Under the Bridge" (Red Hot Chili Peppers) and "Opportunities" (originally by Pet Shop Boys). Bennett’s version of "Creep" was listed in the Triple J Hottest 100, 1996, and he has received nominations at the ARIA Music Awards.

== Early life ==
Frank Bennett was born as David Wray in 1959 and grew up in the Sydney suburb of Birrong (from an Aboriginal word for star) where he attended Birrong Primary and Birrong Boys High School. Wray played drums in his early teens, and after leaving school in 1975, found work as a storeman and labourer.

== Career ==
David Wray started learning saxophone in 1977 and within a year began playing in various bands on the Sydney pub and club circuit from the late 1970s through to the early 1990s: the Layabouts, the Eddys, the Zarzoff Brothers, the Foreday Riders, the Allniters, Club Ska, Paris Green and Bellydance. He began singing professionally several years later as "Tony Sinatra".

In 1996, Wray was offered a recording contract with Polygram/Universal Music and, after changing his stage name to Frank Bennett, he recorded Five O'clock Shadow, an album of lounge music cover versions of contemporary popular songs. Two years later, Bennett released a second album, Cash Landing, on the Capitol Records label, a subsidiary of EMI Music Australia with Derek Williams as co-producer, principal arranger and conductor. The album used a similar big band lineup and rationale to that which had been used for "Creep", and Williams added a full live string section to five of the CD's 13 numbers. With its themes of money and avarice, Cash Landing received a nomination at ARIA Music Awards of 1999 for Best Adult Contemporary Album.

In 1998 Bennett opened for Tom Jones at Sydney's Star City and Burt Bacharach on Bacharach's Australian tour. He appears in the 2000 Australian film The Dish as Barry Steele, a singer who sounds "a little like Frank Sinatra". Bennett has performed on saxophone with Daddy Cool and Glenn Shorrock (ex-the Little River Band), and also played the saxophone solos on Cash Landing.

In 2002 Bennett was a member of Jim Conway's Big Wheel, led by harmonica player, Jim Conway. They released an album, Little Story (September 2003), which received an ARIA nomination for Best Blues and Roots Album in 2004. It was voted best Australian Blues release for 2003 by the readers of Rhythms Magazine.

== Discography ==
=== Studio albums ===
Title	Album details	Peak chart positions
Title	Album details	AUS
Five O'Clock Shadow	Released: November 1996; Label: Mercury Records (534 343–2); Format: CD	65
Cash Landing	Released: November 1998; Label: EMI Records (498085–2); Format: CD	78

=== Singles ===
List of singles, with selected chart positions
Title	Year	Peak chart positions	Album
Title	Year	AUS	Album
"Creep"	1996	74	Five O'Clock Shadow
"Better Man"	1996	—	Five O'Clock Shadow
"Opportunities"	1998	—	Cash Landing
"Beautiful People"	1998	—	Cash Landing
"What's New Pussycat"	1998	—	To Hal and Bacharach

== Awards and nominations ==
=== ARIA Music Awards ===
The ARIA Music Awards is an annual awards ceremony that recognises excellence, innovation, and achievement across all genres of Australian music. They commenced in 1987.

Year	Nominee / work	Award	Result	Ref.
1997	Five O'Clock Shadow	Best New Talent	Nominated	
1997	"Creep"	Breakthrough Artist – Single	Nominated	
1999	Cash Landing	Best Adult Contemporary Album	Nominated	
