= Ute (band) =

- Also known as: Under the External
- Origin: Melbourne, Victoria, Australia
- Genres: Acid jazz
- Years active: 1990s

Ute is a British-Australian band formed by Ian Dixon on trumpet and keyboards and Wayne Elliott on bass guitar and keyboards. Their music has been described as acid jazz. Their album Under The External was nominated for ARIA Award for Best New Talent at the ARIA Music Awards of 1996

== History ==
British-born Ian Dixon and Wayne Elliott met in 1987 when both were students at Adelaide's Elder Conservatorium of Music, while studying music. They formed a dance, jazz group, Switzerland and completed their studies.

Dixon and Elliott relocated to Melbourne, where they formed Ute. The group recorded demos and found greater interest in the English market, hence they relocated to London in the 1990s. They issued their debut album, Free to Be... Free to Breathe, in 1992 via 33 Records, with the pair co-producing. Adrian Jackson in the Age wrote that they had "devised an intelligently constructed set of insistent, funky grooves as a background to a series of instrumental solos (notably Dixon's incisive trumpet and Dale Barlow's cool tenor saxophone), and even a couple of clever (Krazy Cool D-Zine)." They released their major label debut Under the External in 1995. Sharon Aris of the Sydney Morning Herald said of it "A freewheeling soulful vibe permeates the album which cuts a jazz groove with rap, turntables, keyboard and percussion."

== Discography ==
=== Studio album ===
List of studio album with selected details
Title	Details
Free to Be... Free to Breathe	Released: 1992; Label: 33 Records (33JAZZ009); Format: CD, LP
Under the External	Released: 1995; Label: id/Mercury (5287912); Format: CD

=== Singles ===
- "It's a Soul Thing" (1993) – 33 Records
- "One Time" (1993) – 33 Records
- "Joint Just Jumping" (1996) – id/Mercury
- "Not Like You" (1996) – id/Mercury
- "The Third Way"

== Awards and nominations ==
=== ARIA Music Awards ===
The ARIA Music Awards is an annual awards ceremony that recognises excellence, innovation, and achievement across all genres of Australian music. They commenced in 1987.

Year	Nominee / work	Award	Result	Ref.
ARIA Music Awards of 1996	Under The External	Best New Talent	Nominated	
