= Kavisha Mazzella =

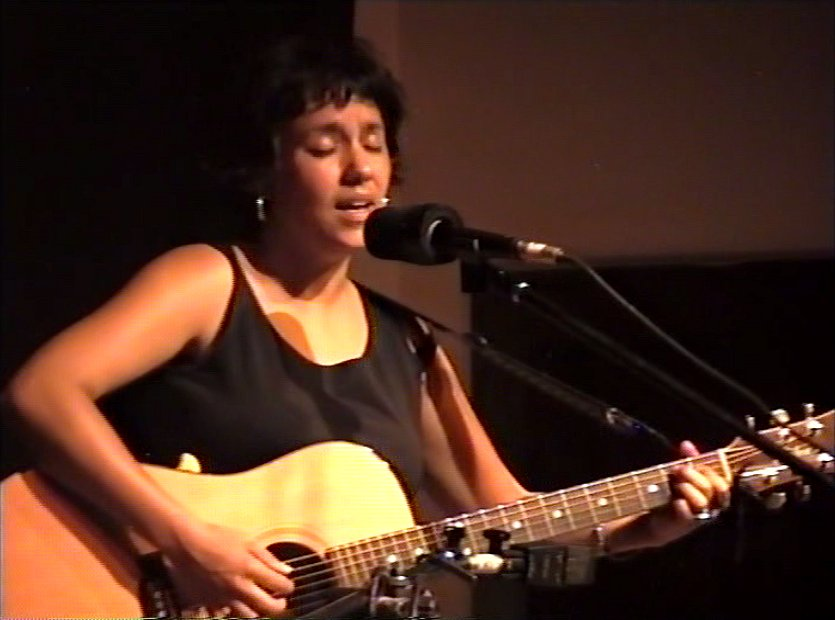
- Mazzella on stage at the Cygnet Folk Festival, 1999

Background information
- Born: Paola Mazzella; London, UK
- Genres: Folk; world
- Occupations: Composer, musician, arranger, singer, songwriter, choirleader
- Instruments: Voice, guitar, accordion, mandolin
- Years active: 1981–present
- Label: Mazzella Music

Kavisha Mazzella AM (pronounced KAV-eesh-a Mutt-Sel-la) is an Australian composer, singer-songwriter, folklorist, activist and choirleader whose style has mediterranean, gypsy and Celtic influences. She won an ARIA Award for Best World Music Album for Fisherman's Daughter produced by Mick Thomas (ex Weddings Parties Anything) in 1998. Mazzella has released several studio albums independently. She is also a member of I Viaggiatori (The Travellers), an Italian-influenced folk band which play Italian folk music and independently released one studio album, Suitcase Serenata, in 2011.

== Early life ==
Mazzella was born in 1959 in London, United Kingdom to an Italian father and an Anglo-Burmese mother. In the 1960s the family emigrated to Perth, Western Australia.

== Musical career ==
In 1981 through researching her Italian heritage Mazzella formed I Papaveri with brother Giri Antonio Mazzella and Sanjiva Gianni Margio playing Italian folk from the 14th century onwards. They released a cassette "Flowers in the Desert" in 1981.

In 1987 after returning from busking in Europe Mazzella formed the band Rich'N' Famous with Lee Buddle, Gary Burke, Reuben Kooperman, Peter Grayling including John Reed. Rich 'N' Famous played shows mainly in Fremantle and various festivals such as Woodford, Port Fairy and Brunswick Music festival.

In 1989 Mazzella founded the Fremantle Italian women's choir Joys of the Women with Italian immigrant women. This was documented by Franco Di Chiera's film The Joys of the Women, which received a national television cinema release in 1993. She led them from 1989 to 1993.

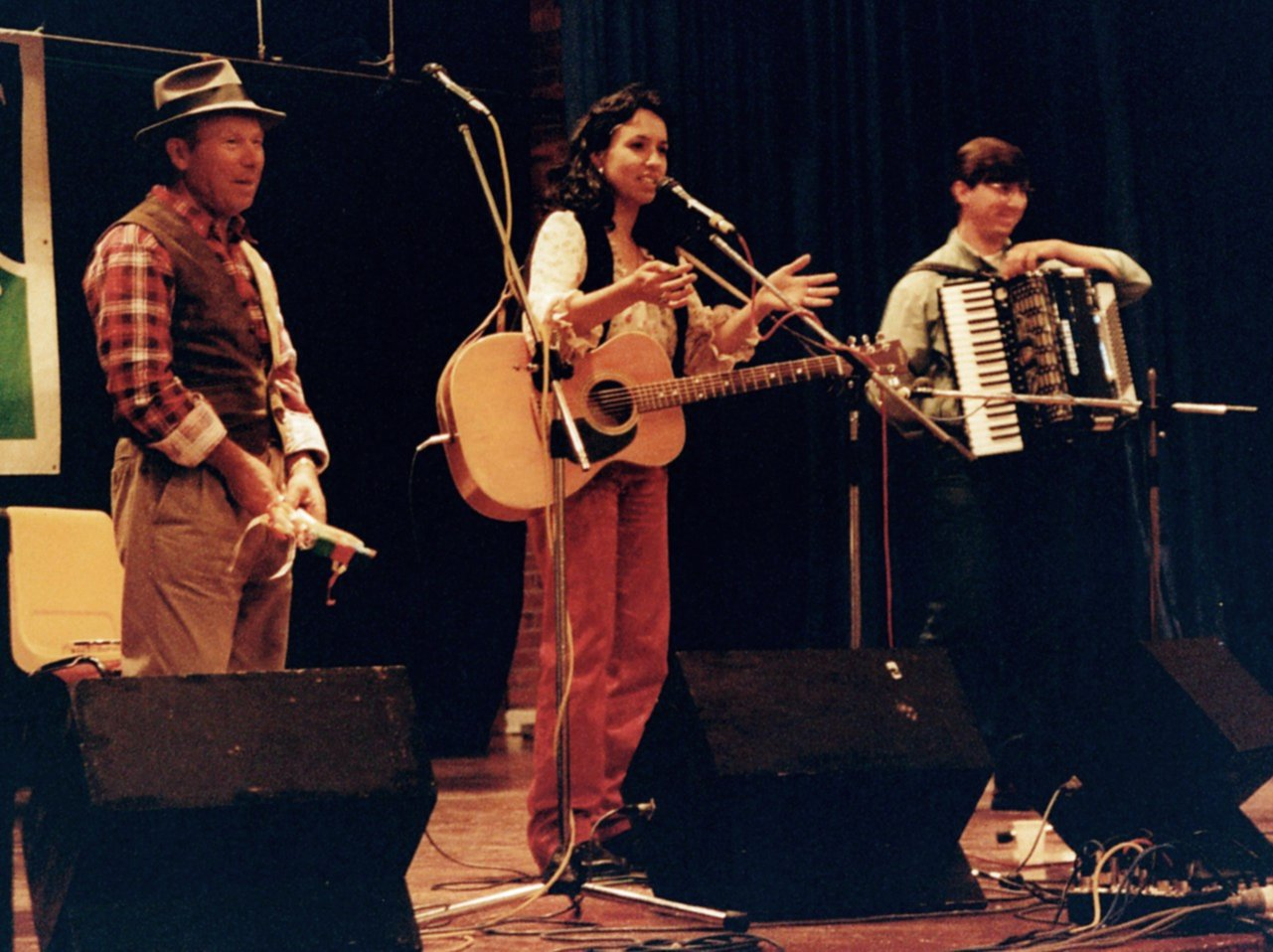
Kavisha Mazzella with Aniello (Andy) and David De Santi performing their Italian music set at the Tamar Valley (George Town) Folk Festival, Australia, 1996

Mazzella's solo releases commenced in 1990 with a self-released 3-track cassette entitled Summer Songs from Kavisha (under the name simply "Kavisha"), followed by her first full album release Mermaids in the Well on Larrikin Records (1995) and Fisherman's Daughter on ABC Music in 1998, which won "Best World Music Album" in that year's ARIA Music Awards. Subsequent releases include Canberra, Cork, Calgary...Live 2000 (2000), Silver Hook Tango (2003) and others (refer Discography). She also contributed to an album 3 Sheilas with Judy Small and Bronwyn Calcutt, released 1997.

In 1996 Mazzella formed the Melbourne Italian Women's choir "la Voce Della Luna".(The Voice of the Moon); in 2000 she was awarded the Italian Government award Italia Nel Mondo for her work in promoting Italian Culture in Australia. She directed la Voce Della Luna until 2013.

In 2004 the Victorian Government commissioned Kavisha to write "Tunc Justus" a choral work celebrating Raffaello Carboni, the famous Italian translator and assistant to Peter Lalor who led the Eureka Stockade uprising in the Victorian Goldfields.The anthem celebrates the Italian connection in the Eureka Stockade.This was first performed at the Echoes of Eureka festival in Ballarat in 2004 to standing ovation. In 2007 Mazzella was commissioned by the Victorian Women's Trust to write the women's Anthem "Love and Justice" to celebrate one hundred years of women's suffrage in Victoria.This premiered in BMW Edge Melbourne Federation Square sung by a choir of over 600 women from regional and metropolitan Melbourne . In 2008 she won the Multicultural Commissions Award for Excellence for her work in community music. From 2011 to 2019 she founded and led the Moon's A Balloon Mental Health Choir in Melbourne.

Mazzella collaborated with Angela Chaplin, the theatre director in Deckchair Theatre Company in Fremantle for many years writing and composing music for shows. In 2002 Mazzella together with co-writers Katherine Thomson and Angela Chaplin won a Helpmann Award for Best New Australian Work for Mavis Goes to Timor.

== Advocacy ==
Kavisha has also worked with indigenous communities in outback Australia teaching songwriting workshops and has also been an advocate for refugees and mental health in many theatre projects. Her concerts and theatre projects promote multicultural harmony and coming together of cultures to share common humanity.

In 2011 Kavisha was awarded an Order of Australia for her services to singing, songwriting and reflecting the experiences of refugees, indigenous and multicultural communities through performance.

In 2023 Kavisha was awarded a Lifetime Achievement Award from FOLK ALLIANCE Australia for advocating for cultural diversity in the Australian Folk festival scene.

== Discography ==
=== Albums ===
List of albums
Title	Album details
as "Kavisha": Summer Songs from Kavisha	Released: 1990; Label: none (self released); Formats: Cassette (3 tracks only)
Mermaids in the Well	Released: 1995; Label: Larrikin Records (LRF 401); re-released Mermaid Productions MPCD001, 1998; Mazzella Music KM003, 2024; Formats: CD
with Judy Small and Bronwyn Calcutt: Three Sheilas	Released: 1997; Label: self released (SSS001); Formats: CD
Fisherman's Daughter	Released: 1998; Label: ABC Music (10572); also EMI 7234 4932122 9, Black Market Music km004, Mazzella Music KM004, 2024; Formats: CD
Canberra, Cork, Calgary...Live 2000	Released: 2000; Label: self released (KM001); Formats: CD; Note: live album
Silver Hook Tango	Released: 2003; Label: Black Market Music (KM002); Formats: CD
Love and Sorrow	Released: 2010; Label: Kavisha Mazzella (KM005); Formats: CD
As "I Viaggiatori" - The Voyagers (with Irene Vala, David De Santi and Mark Holder-Keeping): Suitcase Serenata	Released: 2011; Label: Black Market Music (BMM 347.2); Formats: CD
Riturnella	Released: 2013; Label: Kavisha Mazzella (KM006); Formats: CD
The Fearless Note	Released: 2016; Label: Kavisha Mazzella (KM006); Formats: CD
Empty Sky - Sacred Songs and Chants	Released: 2020; Label: Kavisha Mazzella; Formats: CD
Kavisha Mazzella With Nic Lyon: There Is A Field	Released: 2026; Label: Kavisha Mazzella (KM0009); Formats: CD

=== Soundtracks ===
List of albums
Title	Album details
The Joys of the Women	Released: 1993; Label: ABC Music (5141292); Formats: CD

== Awards and nominations ==
=== ARIA Music Awards ===
The ARIA Music Awards is an annual awards ceremony that recognises excellence, innovation, and achievement across all genres of Australian music. They commenced in 1987.

Year	Nominee / work	Award	Result	Ref.
1998	Fisherman's Daughter	Best World Music Album	Won	
2003	Silverhook Tango	Best World Music Album	Nominated	
