= Degenerates (band) =

Australian rock band

- Years active: 1987 - 2000
- Labels: Amputated Hand, EMI/Chrysalis, Bent Records
- Members: Jamie Durrant; Julian Chick; David Klenjans

Degenerates is an Australian rock band formed by Jamie Durrant (guitar, vocals), Julien Chick (bass) and David Klenjans (drums). Their EP Out Of My Head saw them nominated at the ARIA Music Awards of 1992 for Best New Talent.

Degenerates were formed in 1987 as Degens with Robert MacKay (bass). In 1989 they released a single, "Out Of My Head", through Amputated Hand. They expanded their name to Degenerates, with Julian Chick in place of MacKay on bass, and in 1991 they released an EP "Out Of My Head" through EMI/Chrysalis. In 1992 they released the singles "Crazy World" and "Play Dinosaur" shortly followed by their debut album Play Dinosaur produced at Studios 301, Sydney, by Kevin Shirley.

In 1993, the band started putting out their releases through the Durrant family operated label Bent Records. The second album Outspoken followed in 1993. During this time Durrant released a solo single "Goodbye" in memory of the passing of musician Kurt Cobain.

By the end of 1995, Degenerates had become Box of Anger. They released an EP, Clean" in 1995 and a self titled album in 1996.

Durrant started Penny Safari who released a single "I Believe In Love"/"Two Pennies Drop" in 1998,

Durrant continued running Bent Records, recording and releasing Killing Heidi's first release.

== Discography ==
=== Albums ===
Title	Album details
Play Dinosaur	Released: June 1992; Label: Chrysalis (3218692); Format: CD

=== Extended Plays ===
Title	Album details
Out of My Head	Released: July 1991; Label: Chrysalis (2594-2); Format: CD, 7"

== Awards and nominations ==
=== ARIA Music Awards ===
The ARIA Music Awards is an annual awards ceremony that recognises excellence, innovation, and achievement across all genres of Australian music. They commenced in 1987.

Year	Nominee / work	Award	Result	Ref.
1992	Out of My Head	Best New Talent	Nominated	
