= Hoops Inc. =

Australian group

- Origin: Australia
- Years active: c.1995
- Labels: Dance Pool
- Past members: Steven Hooper; Simon Lewicki

Hoops Inc. were a short-lived Australian dance duo consisting of Steven Hooper and Simon Lewicki. They duo released two singles, before Lewicki formed Groove Terminator in 1996.

== Discography ==
=== Singles ===
Year	Title	Chart positions
Year	Title	AUS
1995	"Joy (A New World Anthem)"	73
1996	"We've Got the Feeling"	-
