= Monique Brumby =

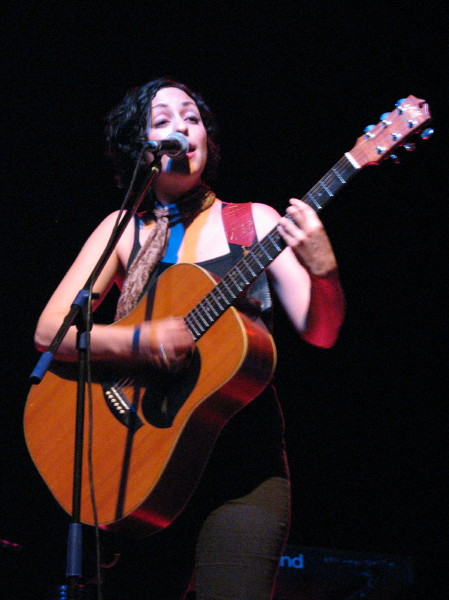
- Monique Brumby performing in Canberra, November 2005

Background information
- Born: 16 September 1974 (age 52); Devonport, Tasmania, Australia
- Genres: Indie pop, rock
- Years active: 1993–present
- Labels: Sony, Columbia, Shock, Rajon
- Formerly of: Monique Brumby & the Riders; Monique Brumby & the Flash Mob
- Website: moniquebrumby.com

Monique Brumby (born 16 September 1974) is an Australian indie pop/rock singer-songwriter, guitarist and producer. Her debut single, "Fool for You", peaked into the top 40 in the Australian Recording Industry Association (ARIA) ARIA Singles Charts, and provided an ARIA Award for Best New Talent at the ARIA Music Awards of 1996. Her single, "Mary", won an ARIA Music Awards of 1997 for ARIA Award for Best Female Artist.

Brumby's songs have been used for television: Neighbours, Home and Away, McLeod's Daughters, The Secret Life of Us and Heartbreak High; and in the Australian films: Diana & Me (1997) and Occasional Coarse Language (1998).

== Early years ==
Brumby was born in 1974 in Devonport, Tasmania, and moved to Hobart at age seven. She attended three different primary schools including Lauderdale Primary School (in nearby Clarence) and then secondary school at St Michael's Collegiate School to Year 12; she sang in stage musicals and tried out for women's soccer. In 1991, she was selected for the Australian under-19 youth team in a three test series against New Zealand. While still at school, Brumby busked by singing to acoustic guitar in Hobart streets and obtained some part-time gigs. In 1993, after leaving school, Brumby had paying gigs in Hobart clubs and then travelled to England on a working holiday as a boarding house mistress for a year; she returned to Tasmania to write songs and, in 1995, relocated to Melbourne, where she performed in local pubs and clubs. She joined a guitar-based band and wrote songs with its members before leaving to concentrate on her own songs. In September 1995, she was the support act for Jeff Buckley's performance at The Athenaeum in Melbourne and at the Phoenician Club in Sydney.

== Career ==
=== 1995–1997: "Fool for You" to Thylacine ===
Brumby signed with Sony Records, she wrote and recorded her debut single, "Fool for You", which was released in April 1996 and peaked at No. 31 on the Australian Recording Industry Association (ARIA) ARIA Singles Charts. It provided an ARIA Award for Best New Talent at the ARIA Music Awards of 1996. The single was also nominated for Breakthrough Artist – Single and Producer of the Year for its producer, David Bridie (member of My Friend the Chocolate Cake). Musicians used on the recording were: Rob Craw on guitar and backing vocals, Will Dickins on bass guitar, Stephen Moffatt on guitar, and Greg Patten (also from My Friend the Chocolate Cake) on drums. In October 1996, Brumby attended a Mushroom Records-run writers' workshop, she worked with Paul Kelly to co-write "Melting". Kelly included the track on his Words and Music released in 1998. Brumby's version appeared on her 2006 album, Into the Blue.

"Mary" was released in September 1996. In addition to Craw, Moffatt and Patten, Brumby's session musicians for the EP included: Michael Barker on drums, Bridie on piano and keyboards, and Paul Kelly on harmonica. "Mary" won the 1997 'Best Female Artist' ARIA for Brumby and received another nomination as 'Producer of the Year' for Bridie.

Her debut album, Thylacine, was produced by Bridie and released in June 1997 by Sony/Columbia. Brumby used session musicians: Barker, Bridie, Craw, Dickins, Moffatt and Patten, with Helen Mountfort (My Friend The Chocolate Cake) on cello, Simon Polinski on bass guitar. In June and July, Brumby was the support act for Kelly on a national tour. Thylacine provided Brumby with an ARIA Award nomination for 'Best Female Artist' and the associated single, "The Change in Me" was nominated for "Song of the Year" in 1998. The B-side, "My Friend Jack", was co-written with Maryanne Window, her guitarist/bass guitarist. Brumby was also awarded Young Tasmanian of the Year in the field of the Arts. Also in 1997, an art photography magazine, Black + White, published The black+white album – A visual celebration of Australian music which included semi-nude photos of Brumby.

=== 1998–2002: Eventide to Signal Hill ===
Brumby co-produced her EP, Eventide, with Polinski, which was released on Sony/Columbia in August 1998 with its lead track, "Wrecking Ball" receiving most airplay. For the EP, Brumby provided songwriting, vocals, guitars (acoustic and electric) and djembe with Window on acoustic and bass guitars, and co-writing "Way it Goes" with Brumby. Brumby described Eventide:

There's a lot more space in the music on Eventide. The songs have got more of an edge and there's also some experimentation with electronica. We thought we'd release the five tracks as a bit of a taste test

— Monique Brumby, 13 October 1998, The Examiner

Brumby started writing songs and making preliminary recordings for her second album, Signal Hill, however problems occurred with Sony and she left to form her own label, Little Wind. Her first independent release was "Silver Dollars" in November 2000 which was distributed by M. Brumby also provided vocals, guitars and keyboards, with assistance of session musicians including her live band, The Riders, consisting of Window, Tom Rouch and Shamus Goble. Additional musicians were Tim Powels (The Church), Joe Creighton (The Revelators), Barry Palmer (Hunters & Collectors, Deadstar), Angus Husband, Stuart Harrison, Bruce Haymes (The Casuals, Professor Ratbaggy), Chris Wilson, Adam Pedretti (Killing Heidi), Craig Patterson and Rachel Samuel. Signal Hill was released on 7 October 2002 by Little Wind distributed by Shock Records, and was produced by Brumby, Moffatt, Polinski and Paul McKercher. In April 2003 Brumby toured the east coast of Australia as a support act to Michelle Shocked.

=== 2003–2006: "Driving Home" to Into the Blue ===
Window became Brumby's manager and a member of Monique Brumby & the Riders to tour in support of Brumby's releases. Other members of the Riders for her 2003 single, "Driving Home", were: Shamus Goble on drums and Tom Rouch on electric and slide guitars. She toured extensively throughout Australia, including a performance in her home town of Hobart playing alongside Jewel and george as part of the 'A Day on the Green' concert. Live versions of "The Change in Me" and "Prophecy" by Brumby were released on the associated various artists' album, A Day on the Green, Live!. In 2005 she participated in Garageband, a project from Irish singer, Andy White, she recorded vocals for the band's self-titled album, Garageband. Brumby was the support act on the Australian tour by US group, The Bangles.

In March 2006, Brumby released her third album, Into the Blue, produced by Brumby and Doug Roberts (Deborah Conway, Chris Wilson, Jack Jones, The Badloves). The album was mastered by Leon Zervos at Sterling Sound, NYC, features her version of "Melting", co-written with Paul Kelly, who appeared as a guest performer, as well as guest performances by Michael Spiby and Kerri Simpson.

In October 2006 she played as the support act for Pete Yorn's Australian performances.

=== 2007–present: Skeletons' Polka and Monique Brumby ===
In 2007 Brumby produced South Australian singer-songwriter, Emily Davis' debut album, Moving in Slow Motion—it was Brumby's first production for another artist.

Emily was looking for a producer so I'd realised her potential and said I'd be interested in helping out. Emily's eyes kinda lit up and it went from there. And it was a great experience as I'd never produced anyone before. So I learnt a lot, especially with Pro Tools. And we actually mixed Emily's album in my lounge room after we'd laid down some good bass and drum tracks at Doug Roberts' studio.

— Monique Brumby, July 2009, Rip It Up

She has since produced the debut album, Zenith Valley, for Melbourne-based acoustic rock group, Mosaik.

Brumby formed Monique Brumby and the Flash Mob, with Shamus Goble, Maryanne Window, Dave Higgins on keyboards and Sophie Turner on guitar. In 2008 they were the support act for another tour by The Bangles. From July 2009, she recorded her fourth album, Skeletons' Polka, co-produced with Mark Opitz.

I'm very excited about the new songs. I went 'home' to Tassie for a month and just demoed the songs using a vocal booth and a little eight-track recorder. It was very relaxing – it's always good to get back to Tassie and reconnect – and then I brought the demos home and played around with them using Pro Tools and added reverb and stuff like that before sending them off to Vicki [Peterson of The Bangles]. I also gave copies to people such as David Bride [sic] and Jeff Lang who are going to be playing on the album so that they could begin thinking about what they might be able to add.

— Monique Brumby, July 2009, Rip It Up

Brumby undertook a series of album launches starting on 19 March 2010 in Hobart to showcase Skeletons' Polka and its first single, "They're Still Alive", both issued on Little Wing/Rajon.

In 2011, Brumby released "Underground" which was to be released from her fifth album Half Moon, Half Everything (October 2011) but the album never eventuated. Brumby's self-titled fifth studio album was released in January 2014, which included "Underground" and singles "All the Ways" and "Silent War".

== Personal life ==
In the December 1997 issue of Outrage, Brumby acknowledged that she is a lesbian, and although some see her as a role model, her sexuality is only one facet of her personality and she would rather be described as a musician.

== Discography ==
=== Studio albums ===
Title	Album details	Peak chart positions
Title	Album details	AUS
Thylacine	Released: June 1997; Label: Sony/Columbia (487196 2); Format: CD, cassette	58
Signal Hill	Released: October 2002; Label: Little Wind/Shock Records (M1249); Format: CD, digital	—
Into the Blue	Released: March 2006; Label: Little Wind/Rajon Records (CDR0565); Format: CD, digital	—
Skeletons' Polka	Released: March 2010; Label: Little Wind/Rajon Records; Format: CD, digital	—
Monique Brumby	Released: January 2014; Label: Little Wind/Rajon Records (201445667); Format: CD, digital	—

=== EPs ===
Title	Details
Eventide	Released: August 1998); Label: Columbia Records (666470-2); Format: CD

=== Singles ===
List of singles, with selected chart positions
Title	Year	Peak chart positions	Album
Title	Year	AUS	Album
"Fool for You"	1996	31	Thylacine
"Mary"	1996	78	Thylacine
"The Change in Me"	1998	57	Thylacine
"Silver Dollars"	2000	—	Signal Hill
"As Sweet as You Are"	2002	—	Signal Hill
"Driving Home"	2003	—	Signal Hill
"Daisy Chain"	2006	—	Into The Blue
"They're Still Alive"	2010	—	Skeletons' Polka
"Underground"	2011	—	Monique Brumby
"All the Ways"	2013	—	Monique Brumby
"Silent War"	2014	—	Monique Brumby
"I Am Woman" (with Judith Lucy)	2015	—	non album singles
"Stop Adani Dirty Coal Mine"	2019	—	non album singles
"Drive Me Crazy"	2020	—	non album singles
"Poland"	2020	—	non album singles
"Tom Deliver"	2020	—	non album singles
"Closer to the Truth"	2021	—	non album singles

== Awards and nominations ==
=== ARIA Music Awards ===
The ARIA Music Awards is an annual awards ceremony that recognises excellence, innovation, and achievement across all genres of Australian music. They commenced in 1987.

Year	Nominee / work	Award	Result	Ref.
1996	"Fool for You"	Best New Talent	Won	
1996	"Fool for You"	Breakthrough Artist – Single	Nominated	
1996	David Bridie for Monique Brumby "Fool for You"	Producer of the Year	Nominated	
1997	"Mary"	Best Female Artist	Won	
1997	David Bridie for Monique Brumby "Mary"	Producer of the Year	Nominated	
1998	Thylacine	Best Female Artist	Nominated	
1998	"The Change in Me"	Song of the Year	Nominated	
