= Douglas Roberts =

Australian painter and art critic

Philip Douglas Roberts (1919–1976) was a South Australian painter and art critic.

== History ==
Roberts was born in Kadina, South Australia, the youngest son of Albert John Roberts (ca.1874 – 3 September 1944) and Sarah Roberts, née Behrmann.

Educated at Kadina, he was a keen cricketer, and at one time held the batting record for the Yorke Peninsula league. He trained as a teacher and was first appointed to the Thebarton Junior Technical School in 1938.

He was a regular art critic for both South Australia daily newspapers and the Sunday Mail.

He was a foundation member of the South Australian branch of the Contemporary Art Society

He was a senior lecturer at the South Australian School of Arts, then acting principal 1957–1958 and principal 1964– .

== Selected works ==
- Portrait of Reginald A. West, former principal of Adelaide High School, held by the school.

The Art Gallery of South Australia holds some fourteen of his paintings.

== Family ==
He married Vera Piggott Southwell, née Southwell (1922–2009) on 22 March 1947. Vera's first husband, Peter Morphett Piggott (12 November 1920 – 30 December 1941) died while serving with RAAF in England.
