= Kevin Hunt (Australian footballer) =

Australian rules footballer

Personal information
- Full name: Kevin Allan Hunt
- Born: 3 December 1933 (age 92)
- Died: 15 September 2016 (aged 82); Pelican Waters, Queensland
- Original team: Pyramid Hill
- Height: 174 cm (5 ft 9 in)
- Weight: 73 kg (161 lb)

Playing career^{1}
| Years | Club | Games (Goals) |
| 1954 | Carlton | 4 (0) |
- ^{1} Playing statistics correct to the end of 1954.

Kevin Allan Hunt (3 December 1933 – 15 September 2016) was an Australian rules footballer who played with Carlton in the Victorian Football League (VFL).
