= Fool for You (Monique Brumby song) =

Single by Monique Brumby

from the album Thylacine
- A-side: "Fool for You"
- Released: April 1996
- Genre: Rock music
- Label: Sony Music Australia
- Songwriter(s): Monique Brumby
- Producer(s): David Birdie

Monique Brumby singles chronology
"Fool for You" (1996)	"Mary" (1996)

"Fool for You" is the first single by the Australian singer-songwriter Monique Brumby. It was released in April 1996 and peaked at number thirty-one on the ARIA Singles Chart. It was included on her first album, Thylacine (1997).

At the ARIA Music Awards of 1996, the track was nominated for three awards. It won the ARIA Award for "best new talent". It was beaten in "breakthrough artist" by Deni Hines' "It's Alright" and "Producer of the Year" by You Am I's Hourly, Daily

== Track listing ==
1. "Fool For You"
2. "Miss Average" (Live Acoustic)
3. "The Real World" (Live Acoustic)

== Charts ==
"Fool for You" debuted at #44 in June 1996 and peaked at number #31 in July. It remained in the top 50 for 10 weeks.

Chart (1996)	Peak position
Australia (ARIA)	31
