= The Change in Me =

Single by Monique Brumby

from the album Thylacine
- A-side: "The Change in Me"
- Released: 13 January 1998
- Genre: Rock music
- Length: 4:14
- Label: Sony Music Australia
- Songwriter: Monique Brumby
- Producer: David Bridie

Monique Brumby singles chronology
"Mary" (1996)	"The Change in Me" (1998)	"Melting" (1998)

"The Change in Me" is a song by Australian singer songwriter Monique Brumby. It was released in January 1998 as the third and final single for her debut studio album, Thylacine (1997).

At the ARIA Music Awards of 1998, the track was nominated for 'ARIA Award for Song of the Year', but lost out to "No Aphrodisiac" by The Whitlams.

== Track listing ==
1. "The Change In Me" - 4:14
2. "My Friend Jack" - 5:20
3. "Lola" - 4:27
