= Thylacine (album) =

Studio album by Monique Brumby
- Released: 7 July 1997
- Genre: Pop rock, rock
- Label: Columbia Records Australia
- Producer: David Bridie

Monique Brumby chronology
Thylacine (1997)	Eventide (EP) (1998)

Thylacine is the debut studio album by Australian singer-songwriter, Monique Brumby.

At the ARIA Music Awards of 1998, the album was nominated for Best Female Artist, but lost out to Left of the Middle by Natalie Imbruglia.

== Track listings ==
1. "Mary"
2. "It's Alright"
3. "Fool for You"
4. "The Change in Me"
5. "One Day"
6. "Lava"
7. "Up and Down"
8. "Just Like That"
9. "Fallen Angel"
10. "Natural"
11. "Bring it on Home"

== Charts ==
Chart (1997)	Peak position
Australian Albums (ARIA)	58
