= Next Time (Marie Wilson song) =

1998 single by Marie Wilson

Single by Marie Wilson

from the album Real Life
- B-side: "Searching"
- Written: September 1997
- Released: 1998
- Length: 4:24
- Label: EastWest; Atlantic
- Songwriter(s): Marie Wilson; Mark Hudson; Jim Vallance
- Producer(s): Joe Hardy

Marie Wilson singles chronology
"Next Time" (1998)	"Won't Keep a Good Girl Down" (1998)

"Next Time" is a song by Australian singer Marie Wilson, released in 1998 as the lead single from her debut studio album, Real Life (1998). The song peaked at number 21 on the Australian Singles Chart. At the ARIA Music Awards of 1998, the song was nominated for Best New Talent and Breakthrough Artist – Single.

== Background and release ==
"Next Time" was co-written by Jim Vallance, Mark Hudson, and Marie Wilson at Miles Copeland's castle (Chateau de Marouatte) in France in September 1997. Released in early 1998, "Next Time" debuted on the Australian ARIA Singles Chart at number 30 for the week ending 15 March 1998. After rising and falling within the top 40 for the next four weeks, the song entered the top 30 and ascended to its peak of number 21 on 10 May 1998. Afterwards, the song fell down the chart, spending four more weeks in the top 50 and logging 13 weeks on the chart altogether. In June 1999, the song was serviced to hot adult contemporary, modern adult contemporary, and contemporary hit radio in the United States.

== Track listing ==
Australian CD single

1. "Next Time" – 4:24
2. "Searching" – 4:27
3. "Next Time" (live/acoustic) – 4:25
- Track three was recorded live on tour with k.d. lang in Sydney, December 1997

== Credits and personnel ==
Credits are lifted from the Australian CD single liner notes and the Real Life album booklet.

Studios

- Produced and engineered at Joe's Garage (Memphis, Tennessee)
- Mixed at Southbeach Studios (Miami, Florida)
- Mastered at Sterling Sound (New York City)

Personnel

- Marie Wilson – writing, vocals, backing vocals, rhythm guitar, keyboards and programming
- Mark Hudson – writing, backing vocals
- Jim Vallance – writing
- Joe Hardy – backing vocals, lead guitar, bass guitar, keyboards and programming, production, engineering
- Greg Morrow – drums
- Tom Lord-Alge – mixing
- Ted Jensen – mastering

== Charts ==
Chart (1998)	Peak position
Australia (ARIA)	21

== Release history ==
Region	Date	Format(s)	Label(s)	Ref(s).
Australia	1998	CD	EastWest	
United States	7 June 1999	Hot adult contemporary; modern adult contemporary radio	Atlantic	
United States	8 June 1999	Contemporary hit radio	Atlantic	
