= Graham Morgan (drummer) =

Australian drummer (1937–2026)

- Born: 30 April 1937; Melbourne, Victoria, Australia
- Died: 1 February 2026 (aged 88)
- Occupation: Drummer

Graham Morgan (30 April 1937 – 1 February 2026) was an Australian drummer and teacher of drumming.

== Life and career ==
Born in Melbourne, Australia, Morgan was educated at Melbourne Grammar School. In 1962, he travelled to Los Angeles, United States, to study under prominent drummers Joe Morello and Murray Spivack.

His work in television included playing on the first ABC television broadcast in 1956, and more than twenty years as staff drummer at GTV-9, playing in bands on live shows such as The Don Lane Show. He also played for 10 years on programmes on the 0/10 Network, including Young Talent Time and The Ernie Sigley Show.

In addition to collaborations with artists such as Cleo Laine, John Dankworth, John Farnham, Kiri Te Kanawa, Clark Terry, Carmen McRae, Freddie Hubbard, Nancy Wilson, and the Melbourne Symphony Orchestra, he performed with numerous informal ensembles and maintained a long career as a highly sought-after session drummer. He has been described as the most recorded drummer in Australia.

Morgan was playing well into his 80s with the jazz ensemble Bete Noire. He taught hundreds of students of drumming, at the Victorian College of the Arts, and privately, through Melbourne-based firm Drumtek. His book, Analysis of Contemporary Drumming: A Modern Physical and Conceptual Approach, was published in 1999.

Morgan died on 1 February 2026, at the age of 88.

== Discography ==
Morgan recorded in Australia, the USA and the UK with artists including:

- Graeme Lyall
- Cleo Laine and John Dankworth
- Kerrie Biddell
- Doug Parkinson
- Jackie Orszaczky
- Normie Rowe
- Lobby Loyde
- Christie Allen
