= Cordrazine (band) =

Australian rock band

- Origin: Melbourne, Victoria, Australia
- Genre: Rock
- Years active: 1996–1998, 2009–present
- Labels: Rubber Records, BMG
- Members: Hamish Cowan; Rohan Heddle; Sam Holloway; Nick Batterham; Jethro Woodward
- Past members: Chris Ambrose
- Website: cordrazine.com.au

Cordrazine are an Australian rock band formed in 1996 in Melbourne. They released a top ten album on the Australian Recording Industry Association (ARIA) Albums Chart, From Here to Wherever in April 1998. The album was nominated for Breakthrough Artist - Album at the ARIA Music Awards of 1998; however they disbanded in 1998. They reformed in 2009.

== History ==
Cordrazine formed in mid-1996 as a rock music band in Melbourne, Victoria, with Chris Ambrose on bass guitar, Hamish Cowan (ex-Blindside) as lead singer-songwriter and guitarist, and Rohan Heddle on drums. They were soon joined by Sam Holloway on keyboards (who was recommended by Rohan) to audition and played in the local pub rock scene. They signed with the Rubber label and released their debut Extended Play (EP), Time to Leave, in May 1997, which peaked at No. 42 on the Australian Recording Industry Association (ARIA) Singles Chart. It featured the track "Crazy", which was placed at No. 17 on radio station Triple J's Hottest 100 in 1997.

"Clearlight", their next single, was released in August but did not reach the top 50. "Memorial Drive" was released in February 1998 ahead of their debut album, From Here to Wherever, in April. The album peaked at No. 9 on the ARIA Albums Chart, and was nominated for 'Breakthrough Artist – Album' at the ARIA Music Awards of 1998. Cordrazine had recorded a cover of the Hal David and Burt Bacharach song "Raindrops Keep Falling on My Head" for a tribute album, To Hal and Bacharach, released by Warner Music Group, also in April. In November the group disbanded. Following the disbandment Cowan formed Hamish with Bryan St James.

== Members ==
- Hamish Cowan – lead singer, guitar (1996–1998, 2009–Current) - Founding member
- Rohan Heddle – drums (1996–1998, 2009–Current) - Founding member
- Nick Batterham – guitar, vocals (2009–Current)
- Jethro Woodward – bass guitar, vocals (2009–Current)
- Sam Holloway – keyboards (1996–1998, 2009)
- Chris Ambrose – bass guitar (1996–1998)

== Discography ==
=== Studio albums ===
Title	Details	Peak chart positions
Title	Details	AUS
From Here to Wherever	Released: April 1998; Label: Rubber Records (74321566382); Format: CD	9
Always Coming Down	Released: July 2010; Label: Rubber Records (RUB253); Format: CD, DD	—

=== Extended plays ===
Title	Details	Peak chart positions
Title	Details	AUS
Time to Leave	Released: May 1997; Label: Rubber Records (RUB063); Format: CD	42

=== Singles ===
Title	Year	Album
"Crazy" "Clearlight"	1997	Time to Leave
"Clearlight"	1997	From Here to Wherever
"Memorial Drive"	1998	From Here to Wherever
"I Never Cared Before"	1998	From Here to Wherever
"Sunshine"	2010	Always Coming Down

== Awards ==
=== ARIA Music Awards ===
The ARIA Music Awards is an annual awards ceremony that recognises excellence, innovation, and achievement across all genres of Australian music.

Year	Nominee / work	Award	Result
1998	From Here to Wherever	Breakthrough Artist - Album	Nominated
1998	Nigel Derricks for Cordrazine From Here to Wherever	Engineer of the Year	Nominated
