= Road Kill (Groove Terminator album) =

Studio album by Groove Terminator
- Released: February 2000
- Studio: The Dog House
- Genre: Electronic
- Length: 65:55
- Label: Virgin Records
- Producer: Noel Burgess, Simon Lewicki

Groove Terminator chronology
Road Kill (2000)	Electrifyin' Mojo (2002)

Singles from Road Kill
- 1. "Losing Ground" Released: 1997; 2. "Here Comes Another One" Released: December 1999; 3. "One More Time (The Sunshine Song)" Released: May 2000; 4. "You Can't See" Released: November 2000

Road Kill is the debut studio album by Australian dance musician Groove Terminator. It was released in February 2000 and peaked at number 39 on the ARIA Charts.

At the ARIA Music Awards of 2000, the album was nominated for Best Male Artist and Best Cover Art.

== Reception ==
The Age said "Roadkill mashed up punky guitar riffage, groove-laden hip-hop, pogoing choruses, rough breaks and anthemic big-beat."

== Track listing ==
1. "What's Your Name?" - 4:21
2. "One More Time (The Sunshine Song)" - 4:07
3. "Who's Gonna Take the Weight?" - 3:20
4. "Yo Baby" - 4:16
5. "You Can't See" (featuring Kool Keith) - 6:37
6. "The Human Beatbox" - 4:24
7. "Here Comes Another One" (featuring Basshoppa) - 3:30
8. "I've Got It in for You" - 8:02
9. "Notorious" - Duran Duran cover - 4:53
10. "Not Everything" (featuring Cameron Baines)- 3:41
11. "Losing Ground" (featuring Zena) (F.I.S.T. remix) - 7:19

== Charts ==
Chart (2000)	Peak position
Australian Albums (ARIA)	39
