= Kevin Hunt (musician) =

Australian jazz pianist and composer

- Origin: Australia
- Genre: Jazz
- Occupations: Pianist, composer

Kevin Hunt is an Australian jazz pianist and composer.

== Early life and education ==
Hunt's first teacher was his father Ellis Hunt.

He trained at The Sydney Conservatorium of Music, alongside musicians such as Don Burrows, James Morrison, and George Golla. His teachers included Chuck Yates, John Speight and David Levy.

== Career ==
Hunt is a jazz pianist and composer. He has been a regular on the Jazz music scene since 1979, and has led his own ensembles performing his own compositions, but also those of classical composers like Johann Bach, Claude Debussy, Maurice Ravel and Leonard Bernstein.

He played in a trio called the JS Bach Trio, with Laurie Thompson and Gary Holgate.

From 1984 until 1988 he worked with the Kinetic Theatre company, and was assistant musical director for Pope John Paul II Youth Celebration.

== Recognition ==
In 1998 the JS Bach Trio (Hunt, with Laurie Thompson and Gary Holgate) won ABC Classic FM's listeners' choice award, for the recording Kevin Hunt plays JS Bach.

In 2001 he was awarded the Australian Elizabethan Theatre Trust Jazz Scholarship to study in New York, in piano and composition. He briefly worked at the Australian International Conservatorium of Music and has also spoke at lectures on music. He was nominated for ARIA Awards for Best Jazz Album with Kevin Hunt - Plays JS Bach in 1998 and with Kevin Hunt Trio - Love Walked In in 2003.

== Discography ==
=== Albums ===
Title	Details	Peak chart positions
Title	Details	AUS
Tree (with Steve Hunter and David Jones)	Released: 1997; Label: Birdland	—
Kevin Hunt Plays JS Bach	Released: 1998; Label: ABC Jazz (724349515727)	—
Love & Logic (with Steve Hunter and David Jones)	Released: May 1999; Label: ABC Jazz	—
Cocktails With The Kevin Hunt Trio	Released: 1999; Label: ABC (SHOPS005)	—
Love Walked In	Released: 2002; Label: La Brava (0055)	—
The Magic of Hoagy Carmichael (with Marie Wilson)	Released: April 2004; Label: Marie Wilson and Kevin Hunt (MWKH2002)	—
Eye to Eye Vol 1+2 (with Don Burrows)	Released: June 2007	—
Duelling Schimmels (with Simon Tedeschi)	Released: 2008; Label: Schimmel	—
Woodlands (with Simon Tedeschi)	Released: October 2010	—

== Awards and nominations ==
=== ARIA Awards ===
The ARIA Music Awards are annual awards, which recognises excellence, innovation, and achievement across all genres of Australian music. They commenced in 1987.

Year	Nominee / work	Award	Result	Ref.
1998	Kevin Hunt Plays JS Bach	Best Jazz Album	Nominated	
2003	Love Walked In	Best Jazz Album	Nominated	

=== Mo Awards ===
The Australian Entertainment Mo Awards (commonly known informally as the Mo Awards), were annual Australian entertainment industry awards. They recognise achievements in live entertainment in Australia from 1975 to 2016. Kevin Hunt won one award in that time.

Year	Nominee / work	Award	Result (wins only)
1998	Kevin Hunt	Jazz Instrumental Performer of the Year	Won
