= Eventide (EP) =

EP by Monique Brumby
- Released: August 1998
- Recorded: 1998
- Studio: Melbourne
- Genre: Rock; electronica
- Length: 21:49
- Label: Sony
- Producer: Monique Brumby; Simon Polinski; Kalju Tonuma

Monique Brumby chronology
Thylacine (1997)	Eventide (1998)	Signal Hill (2002)

Eventide is a five-track extended play by Australian singer-songwriter, Monique Brumby. It was released in August 1998 by Sony Music Australia. A music video for its lead track, "Wrecking Ball", was released to promote the EP.

In Hobart newspaper, The Examiner, on 13 October 1998, former local resident Brumby described the EP to the reporter, "There's a lot more space in the music on Eventide. The songs have got more of an edge and there's also some experimentation with electronica. We thought we'd release the five tracks as a bit of a taste test." She explained that it would provide a "bridge" between her debut album, Thylacine (1997), and her next one.

== Track listing ==
1. "Wrecking Ball" (Monique Brumby) – 3:56
2. "Way It Goes" (Brumby, Maryanne T Window) – 5:01
3. "A Better Way" (Brumby, John Shanks) – 3:57
4. "Progress" (Brumby) – 3:43
5. "Gold Dust" (Brumby, Carl Manuell, Ross Farrell) – 5:14

== Credits ==
Adapted from EP liner.

- Monique Brumby – acoustic guitar, lead vocals
- Peter Luscombe – lead guitar
- Memory Man – djembe, lead guitar
- Carl Manuell – drums
- Helen Mountford – cello
- Michael Sheridan – keyboards
- Phil Wales – lead guitar
- Maryanne Window – guitars (bass, acoustic)
