= Words and Music (Paul Kelly album) =

Studio album by Paul Kelly
- Released: 10 May 1998
- Genre: Folk; rock
- Length: 68:36
- Label: Mushroom (AUS); Vanguard (US)
- Producer: Paul Kelly; Mark Opitz; Simon Polinski

Paul Kelly chronology
Songs from the South (1997)	Words and Music (1998)	Smoke (1999)

Singles from Words and Music
- 1. "Nothing on my Mind" Released: 1997; 2. "Saturday Night and Sunday Morning" Released: 1998; 3. "I'll Be Your Lover" Released: 1998; 4. "Melting" Released: 1998

Words and Music is an album recorded by Paul Kelly and originally released in 1998.

== Description ==
The album was released on Mushroom Records in Australia and Vanguard Records in the United States. It peaked at 17 in Australia and 44 in New Zealand and was certified gold.

Kelly was nominated and won an ARIA Award in the category Best Male Artist for Words and Music in 1998.

== Songs ==
The US release included one additional track, "How to Make Gravy", which in Australia was released as a separate Extended Play prior to the release of Words and Music and was nominated as Song of the Year at the 1997 Australian Record Industry Association (ARIA) Awards. In the US the song appeared as the fifth track, inserted between "Words and Music" and "Gutless Wonder".

The song "Little Kings" begins "I’m so afraid for my country, There’s an ill wind blowing no good, So many lies in the name of history" and includes the lyrics:

In the land of the little kings
There’s a price on everything
And everywhere the little kings
Are getting away with murder

The title was used for the feature-length documentary film, Land of the Little Kings, which tells the stories of Indigenous children affected by being forcibly removed from their families, through the stories of Archie Roach and Ruby Hunter, and the song is sung by Roach in the film.

== Track listing ==
All songs were written by Paul Kelly, except where noted.

1. "Little Kings" – 5:17
2. "I'll Be Your Lover" – 4:12
3. "Nothing on My Mind" (Kelly, Peter Luscombe, Steve Hadley) – 4:55
4. "Words and Music" – 4:40
5. "Gutless Wonder" – 4:56
6. "Tease Me" (Kelly, Bruce Haymes) – 4:08
7. "I'd Rather Go Blind" – 3:12
8. "She Answers the Sun (Lazy Bones)" (with Rebecca Barnard) – 5:24
9. "Beat of Your Heart" – 5:48
10. "It Started with a Kiss" (Errol Brown) – 4:15
11. "Glory Be to God" – 4:07
12. "Saturday Night and Sunday Morning" – 4:06
13. "Charlie Owen's Slide Guitar" – 3:47
14. "Melting" (Kelly, Monique Brumby) (with Monique Brumby) – 5:12

US Edition

1. "Little Kings" – 5:17
2. "I'll Be Your Lover" – 4:12
3. "Nothing on My Mind" (Kelly, Peter Luscombe, Steve Hadley) – 4:55
4. "Words and Music" – 4:40
5. "How To Make Gravy" – 5:10
6. "Gutless Wonder" – 4:56
7. "Tease Me" (Kelly, Bruce Haymes) – 4:08
8. "I'd Rather Go Blind" – 3:12
9. "She Answers the Sun (Lazy Bones)" (with Rebecca Barnard) – 5:24
10. "Beat of Your Heart" – 5:48
11. "It Started with a Kiss" (Errol Brown) – 4:15
12. "Glory Be to God" – 4:07
13. "Saturday Night and Sunday Morning" – 4:06
14. "Charlie Owen's Slide Guitar" – 3:47
15. "Melting" (Kelly, Monique Brumby) (with Monique Brumby) – 5:12

== Personnel ==
- Rebecca Barnard – vocals ("She Answers the Sun" and "Beat of Your Heart")
- John Barrett – saxophone ("Gutless Wonder")
- Monique Brumby – vocals ("Melting")
- Renee Geyer – vocals ("Beat of Your Heart")
- Steve Hadley – bass
- Spencer P. Jones – guitar
- Paul Kelly – guitar, vocals
- Bruce Haymes – keyboards
- Laurence Maddy – horns ("Words and Music")
- Peter Luscombe – drums
- Shane O'Mara – guitar
- Russell Smith – horns ("Words and Music")

== Charts ==
Chart (1998)	Peak position
Australian Albums (ARIA)	17
New Zealand Albums (RMNZ)	43

== Certifications ==
Region	Certification	Certified units/sales
Australia (ARIA)	Gold	35,000^{^}
^{^} Shipments figures based on certification alone.
