= Ticket to Earth =

2017 video game

- Developer: Robot Circus
- Publisher: Robot Circus
- Platforms: iOS; macOS; Microsoft Windows; Android
- Release: iOS: WW: 15 March 2017; macOS, Windows: WW: 28 June 2017; Android: WW: 12 December 2017
- Genres: Tactical role-playing, puzzle

Ticket to Earth is an episodic puzzle/tactical RPG indie video game by the Australian developer Robot Circus. The first episode was released in March 2017 for iOS, and the game was also released on Android, Microsoft Windows and macOS. The music and sound was created by Davide Carbone, Josh Abrahams and James Hewson of samplify.

== Setting and gameplay ==
Set in a far-future offworld colony, the game sees the protagonist Rose fight mutant alien lifeforms, a robot uprising and other threats together with three other team members.

The turn-based tactical combat is complemented with tile-matching puzzle elements, as Rose and her enemies have to traverse floor tiles of matching colors to move and charge their combat powers.

== Reception ==
Reception

Aggregate score
Aggregator	Score
Metacritic	iOS: 84/100

In Kotaku, Mike Fahey praised Ticket to Earth as an "evolutionary leap forward in the puzzle/RPG hybrid genre", noting its "supremely satisfying game mechanics" and "killer sense of style". Writing for Pocket Gamer, Harry Slater likewise gave the game high marks for the quality of its gameplay and writing, describing it as "an original, smart, challenging puzzling RPG" that combined "head-scratching and character development" in an unprecedented manner.
