= Davide Carbone =

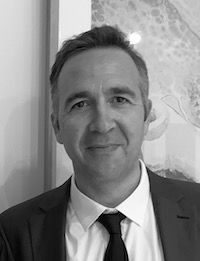
- Davide Carbone at the Melbourne Techno Awards, 2019

Background information
- Also known as: David Carbone, DC, DCee, FSOM, Calbesque, Carbon Electra, samplify
- Origin: Melbourne, Australia
- Occupations: Record producer, DJ, composer, sound designer, music software developer
- Years active: 1987–present
- Labels: Shock, BS1 Records, 31, Renegade Recordings, Volition Records, Intec, React, Warner
- Website: samplify.studio, bs1records.com, schoolofsynthesis.com

Davide Carbone is an Australian music producer, composer, sound designer and technologist. Listed as one of the 7 most influential Australian music producers of all time by Australia's premier audio and music publication Mixdown Magazine, and one of the greatest Australian electronic acts of all time by Rolling Stone, Carbone has released several records, produced music for major artists, composed music and created sound design for TV, film, theatre, and video games, and developed music making software.

== Career ==
=== 1992–1998: Future Sound of Melbourne and ARIA Award ===
Carbone was born in 1971 in Melbourne and started as a DJ in the Melbourne nightclub scene. In 1990 he started an electronic music show called Rhythmatic on Australian radio station 3RRR. Carbone formed the techno group, Future Sound of Melbourne (FSOM) with Josh Abrahams and acid house DJ Steve Robbins. They released 12" singles on Shock Records, Sony Music imprint Volition Records and also released tracks on Belgium's underground dance-music label, Two Thumbs Records. Future Sound of Melbourne won the ARIA Award for "Best Dance Release" for their Chapter One album in 1996.

=== 1998–2004: BS1 Records and relocation to England ===
In 1998, Carbone relocated to Bristol, England where he started drum and bass record label BS1 Records. The label was responsible for launching the career of artists such as TC. Carbone performed at the 1999 Roskilde Festival in Denmark. Carbone also released several drum and bass singles through BS1 Records, 31 Records and React. His single El Dorado debuted at No. 5 in the UK dance singles chart in 2002. In 2004, Carbone moved to London where he produced the sample pack Davide Carbone's Drum & Bass Masterclass for Loopmasters. Released in 2006, the sample pack garnered critical acclaim from the music press including an MTM (Music Tech Magazine) recommended award. During his period in London, Carbone composed several pieces for TV, film and Video Games. His music appeared on Discovery Channel and the Japanese video games Get Amped 2, Get Amped Tournament Edition and Cosmic 21. Get Amped 2, a Massively multiplayer online game (MMO) has over twenty million registered players. Carbone also joined UK music production house Delicious Digital where he composed over one hundred pieces of music, some of which featured on BBC Radio 5 Live, BBC Two and the promo video for House of Saddam which was awarded a 2009 gold Promax Award.

=== 2009–2014: Return to Melbourne and formation of s:amplify ===
In 2009, Carbone returned to Melbourne, Australia where he formed s:amplify. Under this new moniker Carbone teamed with Josh Abrahams and Carl Cox to co-write and co-produce Cox's artist album All Roads Lead to the Dancefloor, released in 2011. This trio also provided remixes for Moby, Miguel Bosé Josh Wink and Gilles Peterson, among others. Carbone also provided complete sonic and music branding packages for 774 ABC Melbourne, Melbourne TV network Channel 31, Melbourne public transport company Metro Trains Melbourne, Macquarie University in Sydney, Tahiti Toursime, and Fiji Airways for which the rebranding package that included Carbone's music was awarded with the Rebrand 2014 Best of Award. s:amplify have also composed music and created sound design for Tourism Australia, Alienware, Ford, Jaguar Cars, BMW, Telstra, the International Cricket Council. and The Artful Escape which was nominated for a BAFTA Award for Audio Excellence and a Golden Joystick Award for Best Audio.

In 2011, s:amplify were featured on the front cover of the April issue of Music Tech magazine and were appointed musical directors for the City of Sydney New Year's Eve fireworks show. The 2011/2012 12-minute NYE Fireworks show on Sydney Harbour showcased 24 Australian songs including original composition from Carbone. Carbone and Abrahams were again appointed musical directors for the 2012/2013 Sydney New Year's Eve fireworks show where they worked alongside Kylie Minogue to produce the 12-minute soundtrack for the show which culminated in a music composition by Carbone that featured exclusive content from Kylie. Carbone also created the 30-minute soundtrack for the highest commemorative status given to an Australian event since the Sydney 2000 Olympics, the International Fleet Review. Carbone worked closely alongside the Royal Australian Navy Band to create the soundtrack. Carbone was again appointed musical director for 2013/2014 Sydney New Year's Eve fireworks show where he worked alongside creative director Reg Mombassa and composed several pieces including the orchestral finale which was attended by 2 million people and broadcast to over a billion people worldwide.

Carbone has tutored at various universities and colleges including the City Literary Institute and RMIT University. In 2012 Carbone founded the School of Synthesis in Melbourne which was set up to offer high end intensive courses in advanced music and audio production.

=== 2013–2017: Awards, Carbon Electra, and video game scoring ===
Carbone was nominated for best soundtrack for his work on the award-winning short film 'Woody' at the 2013 APRA Screen Music Awards and was again nominated at the 2015 and the 2017 APRA Screen Music Awards for his work for Tahiti Tourism and Hennessy. He also produced the top selling sample pack 'Carl Cox - My Life in Music' which was awarded 10/10 by Computer Music Magazine quoting 'One of the most essential sample packs we have ever heard'. In 2015 Carbone designed 'Carbon Electra', a virtual analog synthesiser that features factory presets from internationally acclaimed artists including Mike Huckaby, DJ Pierre, Freemasons, Kosheen, D-Product and Dom Kane. Carbon Electra received several positive reviews in major magazines including Sound on Sound, DJ Mag, Computer Music and was awarded the Music Tech Magazine ‘Editors Choice Award’.

In 2016 Carbone composed the original score and created sound design for the video game Ticket to Earth including the trailer music. The game was featured on the App Store (iOS) and received may positive reviews. The soundtrack was also well received. Pocket Gamer, wrote " an awesome soundtrack, the beautiful art style and soundtrack are key elements to immersing yourself" TouchArcade awarded Ticket To Earth 'Game of The Week' whilst stating "Fantastic music - seriously, turn the sound up." Carbone has also remixed several tracks as part of the Carl Cox Collective and produced and co-wrote an album for Australian artist Wednesday titled 'Fading' which debuted in the top 5 [Triple J] Unearthed charts. In 2017 Carbone as Carbon Electra released the 'Mussenden EP' on Intec Digital, and as FSOM released 'The 90's Anthology' album featuring tracks never before available online.

=== 2018–2020: Scaler software development ===
Carbone designed and released the music software 'Scaler' to positive acclaim as the first piece of software that analyses musical performances and notation in order to detect the scale and key and suggest alternate scales, chord voicings and chord progressions. Scaler received several positive reviews in major magazines and webzines including a 10/10 'Excellence Award' and 'Editors Choice Award' in MusicTech Magazine, a 9/10 in Computer Music, and a review in Sound on Sound which called Scaler 2 "A triumph". In 2020 Scaler 2 was awarded a MusicTech 'Gear of the Year' Award by its readers.

=== 2021–present: recent releases and collaborations ===
In 2021, Carbone released his 'Carbon Electra' album on BS1 Records which featured 12 original tracks including 'Eventide', 'Chosen' and 'Rebelist'. The Carbon Electra LP was launched to a global audience and featured on Apple Music, Spotify, Beatport, BBC Radio One and Drum and Bass Arena. The album received several positive reviews and was called 'A Masterpiece' by WUB Magazine. Carbone has also recently co-composed the music for Tumi's global campaign featuring the actor Alexander Skarsgard, written the soundtrack for the video game 'Torque Drift' announced at the Game Developers Conference, and composed the music for the Australian Football League AFL Finals advertising campaign 'Don't Believe in Never'. Carbone also attended the 'Open Saudi, Open Hearts, Open Doors' event in which he worked with local musicians and composers to score the entire multi-sensory show to commemorate the launch of E-visa tourist scheme into the Kingdom of Saudi Arabia. Davide Carbone was also awarded a 'Techno Pioneer Award' at the Melbourne Underground Techno Awards for his role in introducing Techno Music into Australia and was heavily featured in the book 'Techno Shuffle: rave culture and the Melbourne underground'. In March 2025 Davide Released Scaler 3 a highly anticipated follow-up to the multi award winning music theory software Scaler 2 which has gone to receive several awards including a KVR Readers Award. As of 2026, Carbone continues to collaborate with artists such as Carl Cox and vocalist Kate Watts, and releases music under various monikers—including FSOM, Carbon Electra, Calbesque and Davide Carbone.

== Discography ==
- "Melodia" / "Alien 8" (1992) Candyline Records
- "Beyond E.P." (1992) Candyline Records
- "Shiva Ratri" (1993) Two Thumbs
- "The Avatar E.P." (1994) Candyline Records
- "System X" (1995) Volition
- "Chapter One" (1995) Volition
- "Dicted" (2000) BS1 Records
- "Do You Copy?" (2000) BS1 Records
- "Direct" (2001) Industry Recordings/React Music
- "El Dorado" (2002) Industry Recordings/React Music
- "Friday" (2002) Industry Recordings/React Music
- "In Your Mind" (2002) BS1 Records
- "Innocence" (2002) Industry Recordings/React Music
- "Check It Out" (2003) BS1 Records
- "Chinatown" (2003) BS1 Records
- "Dum Dum" (2003) Industry Recordings/React Music
- "Escape" (2003) BS1 Records
- "Get Down" (2003) Industry Recordings/React Music
- "Heavies" (2003) BS1 Records
- "Secret Levels" (2003) Industry Recordings/React Music
- "Frisco Disco" (2004) Industry Recordings/React Music
- "Hold My Breath" (2004) BS1 Records
- "Let It Roll" (2004) Defunked
- "Lift You Up" (2004) BS1 Records
- "Lovin' Me" (2004) Rubik Records
- "Low Til I Smoke" (2004) Industry Recordings/React Music
- "My Thing" (2004) Industry Recordings/React Music
- "Soul Salaam" (2004) Industry Recordings/React Music
- "Thousand Miles" (2004) Industry Recordings/React Music
- "Totally Distracted" (2004) Defunked
- "After Dark" (2005) BS1 Records
- "Enamorada" (2005) 31 Records
- "Keep on Pushing" (2005) Renegade Records
- "Pull Your Body" (2005) 31 Records
- "Ready With This / Six Hills" (2005) Intrinsic Recordings
- "Strictly Rollin" (2005) BS1 Records
- "Liquidiser" (2006) BS1 Records
- "Misty VIP" (2007) BS1 Records
- "Unusual Sound" (2008) Levitated
- "Cienfuegos" (2009) BS1 Records
- "Radionuclide" (2009) BS1 Records
- 'Arroz Con Pollo" Giles Peterson <Carl Cox Remix> (2010) Little Idiot
- 'Ayurvédico" Miguel Bose <Carl Cox Remix> (2010) Warner Music Latino
- "All Roads Lead to the Dancefloor" Carl Cox (2011) Intec Digital
- 'Walk With Me" Moby <Carl Cox Remix> (2011) Little Idiot
- 'If I Ever Lose my Faith" Scumfrog & Sting <Carl Cox Remix> (2012) Armada Music
- 'Popof" Lidl Girl ft Arno Joey <Carl Cox Collective Remix> (2016) Hot Creations
- 'Talking to You" Josh Wink <Carl Cox Remix> (2016) Intec Digital
- "The 90's Anthology" FSOM (2017) FSOM
- "Mussenden EP" (2017) Intec Digital
- "Abruzzo" (2018) BS1 Records
- "The Upside Down" (2018) BS1 Records
- "Nobody" (2018) BS1 Records
- "Spectra" (2019) BS1 Records
- "Rebelist" (2021) BS1 Records
- "Omnia" (2021) BS1 Records
- "Chosen" (2021) BS1 Records
- "Carbon Electra LP" (2021) BS1 Records
- "Nightlife" DCee (2022) BS1 Records
- "Eventide" <Logistics Remix> (2022) BS1 Records
- "Learn to Fly" <feat. Kate Watts> (2024) DNBB Records
- "Finding Myself" <feat. Kate Watts> (2024) BS1 Records
- "Kingdom Down" <feat. Kate Watts> (2024) BS1 Records
- "Coast of the Gods" Calbesque (2024)
- "All I Desire" <feat. Kate Watts> (2024) DNBB Records
- "Eden" Calbesque (2024)
- "Breaking Free" <feat. Kate Watts> (2025) BS1 Records
- "Version of Us" (2025) BS1 Records
- "Lost Control" (2026) BS1 Records
- "Halcyon Tides" Calbesque (2026)
- "Runaway" (2026) BS1 Records
- "Iluka" Calbesque (2026)

== Awards and nominations ==
=== List of awards and nominations received by Davide Carbone ===
Year	Event	Award	Recipient	Result
1997	ARIA Music Awards	Best Dance Release	"Chapter One"	Won
2008	Radio Academy Awards	Best Station Imaging	"BBC Radio 5 Live"	Nominated
2009	Promax Awards	Gold Award	"House of Saddam"	Won
2013	APRA Awards (Australia)	Best Short Film Soundtrack	"Woody"	Nominated
2015	APRA Awards (Australia)	Best Music for an Advertisement	"Tahiti Tourism"	Nominated
2017	APRA Awards (Australia)	Best Music for an Advertisement	"Hennessy"	Nominated
2017	Techno Awards (Australia)	Techno Pioneer	"Davide Carbone"	Won
2020	MusicTech Awards	Gear of the Year	"Scaler 2"	Won
2021	Golden Joystick Awards	Best Audio	"The Artful Escape"	Nominated
2021	BAFTA Games Awards	Audio Excellence	"The Artful Escape"	Nominated
