= Audio Out =

Studio album by Amiel
- Released: 18 August 2003
- Length: 49:57
- Label: Festival
- Producer: Josh Abrahams, Scott Sandilands, Ryan Freeland, Stuart Crichton, Daniel "Conrad" Glitch, Andy Baldwin, Justin Tresidder, Krish Sharma

Amiel chronology
Audio Out (2003)	These Ties (2005)

Alternative cover
- The cover of the album released in Germany and Japan.

Singles from Audio Out
- 1. "Lovesong" Released: March 2003; 2. "Obsession (I Love You)" Released: June 2003; 3. "Tonight" Released: September 2003

Audio Out is the first album by the Australian singer Amiel, released in Australia by Festival Records on 18 August 2003 (see 2003 in music). Produced by Josh Abrahams, the album is filled with a variety of strange pop songs which helped the album to receive favorable reviews. Amiel states that the album comes from the love of so many different kinds of music; hip hop, folk and pop music and she states "[the album] is my weird take on the world. It all comes from how I see the world." Audio Out debuted inside the top twenty on the Australian ARIA Albums Chart and is her highest selling album to date. The singles released from the album had minor success on the Australian ARIA Singles Chart with "Lovesong" being a top ten hit, "Obsession (I Love You)" becoming a top twenty hit while "Tonight" failed to crack the top fifty. The album nominated Amiel for five awards at the 2003 ARIA Awards including; "Single of the Year", "Highest Selling Single", "Best Female Artist", "Breakthrough Artist – Album" and "Best Pop Release".

== Recording and writing ==
After Amiel's success with her debut single "Addicted to Bass" in 1999 she moved from Melbourne to Sydney to work further with Abrahams and Festival Records. The first songs to emerge from the songwriting process were "Lovesong", "Side by Side" and "Claire De Lune". She then traveled to the United States where she was introduced to the music production team The Matrix (who were developing Avril Lavigne at the time) and together they wrote "Obsession (I Love You)" and "All of Me". Recording began back in Melbourne where Abrahams had set up an old 1970's house full of studio gear. Many producers and musician helped with the album including Ryan Freeland (who had produced for Aimee Mann and assisted Bob Clearmountain), Justin Tressidor (who has worked with george) and Brad Haehnel (who had mixed albums for Nelly Furtado).

Amiel states "The album says what I wanted it to say. Every step along the way, everything, it all has a specific signature of me on it." Amiel states this, because she feels her music "defies the usual stereotypes". She also states "People say 'where do we put you? You're obviously pop but are you country, are you dance, are you R‘n’B?’ I'm all those things. It's a fusion, a hybrid, and a mish-mash of all these different influences coming together. So I had to learn to say my piece and stick up for myself. I realized that if the audience was going to believe it, it had to be real and if it was going to be real it had to come from me."

== Critical reception and commercial performance ==
Professional ratings
Review scores
Source	Rating
inthemix	favourable
Rolling Stone	3/5 stars
Undercover	favourable

Audio Out received acclaim from the Australian music press. Tim Cashmere of the Australian magazine, Undercover, states that the album is full of "catchy guitar-pop tunes more aimed at a generic market than Abrahams' club hit ["Addicted to Bass"]." Tim Duggen of Rolling Stone magazine, states that Amiel could be Australia's answer to Jewel, "as the music melts into the background." Duggen's states "It is perfect pop in a way that only years of writing and production can produce, but it's also soulless and easily disposable." Ending the review, he states "It's light, it's sweet, but don't expect any revelations, just 11 fucking love songs." Australian dance music magazine, In the Mix, gave the album a "thumbs up for a sophisticated electronic pop gem", stating "If your [sic] a fan of pop then this record will exceed your expectations, for the more dance orientated crowd who are thirsty for more of the same old Amiel stuff, you may find yourself a little surprised at the change but still quite satisfied with quite a few tracks especially the Josh/Amiel collaborations."

Audio Out was commercially successful in Australia and Japan. In late August 2003, it debuted at number seventeen on the Australian ARIA Albums Chart. The album dropped out of the top fifty after five weeks and spent ten weeks in the top one hundred, leaving at number ninety-three. The Australian Recording Industry Association awarded the album a gold certification for shipping 35,000 copies. At the 2003 ARIA Awards, the album was nominated for "Breakthrough Artist – Album" and "Best Pop Release", but lost both awards to Innocent Eyes by Delta Goodrem. In Japan, the album debuted on the Japan Oricon Albums Chart in February 2004 and went to peak at number twenty. It spent nineteen weeks in the chart and sold an excess of 18,824 copies.

== Singles ==
"Lovesong", the first single, became Amiel's most-successful single release, reaching number six on the Australian ARIA Singles Chart. Written by Amiel herself, she states that the song is quite autobiographical, she states "I went out with this guy, it was three dates, just dinners, it was so irrelevant, it was completely nothing. I was new in town and I wanted something, someone. But it was a waste of time. I thought: great, all I got out of that was a love song, another fucking love song." The single was released on 10 March 2003 and was certified platinum by ARIA and was the thirty-fourth highest selling single in Australia for 2003. The song was nominated for "Single of the Year" and "Highest Selling Single" at the 2003 ARIA Awards.

The second single "Obsession (I Love You)" was written with the music production team The Matrix and featured an electropop vibe. It became a top-twenty hit for Amiel in Australia. "The song went through many changes and has had many lives" states Amiel. She explains "In the end it [the song] took on a kind of Nine Inch Nails vibe. That’s what Josh is like. He becomes obsessed and driven toward a particular thing and in this song that is what he wanted. It totally works for this song to be dark and strange because it helps illustrate the obsessive, deluded character that I am playing". The song was the twentieth highest selling single in Australia, for an Australian artist, for 2003.

"Tonight", the third single, was the album's least successful single, peaking at number sixty-four in Australia. Amiel wrote the song it in a day with Stuart Crichton and Barry Palmer. Amiel states "Stuart had this William Orbit kind of groove and Barry had a nice riff and it evoked an image for me. It's a meditative song. Then when we had finished Josh remixed it into a 60’s psychedelic thing, he sped it up and gave it its 'Tomorrow Never Knows' type feel. It’s easy to tell from this song that he is obsessed with The Beatles!." The CD single was released in Australia on 29 September 2003 and featured remixes of "Tonight" by Ken Cloud and Kid Kenobi.

== Track listing ==
No.	Title	Writer(s)	Length
1.	"Lovesong"	Amiel Daemion	3:31
2.	"Tonight"	Stuart Crichton, Daemion, Barry Palmer	3:38
3.	"Clair De Lune"	Josh Abrahams, Daemion	3:27
4.	"Side by Side"	Daemion, Palmer	3:21
5.	"Missing the Music"	Abrahams, Daemion	4:12
6.	"All of Me"	Lauren Christy, Daemion, Graham Edwards, Scott Spock	3:56
7.	"Obsession (I Love You)"	Christy, Daemion, Edwards, Spock	3:55
8.	"Games We Play"	Daemion	3:54
9.	"Theme for a One Night Stand"	Abrahams, Daemion	4:45
10.	"Final Piece"	Daemion	4:34
11.	"Nothing Can Break Me"	Daemion, Krish Sharma	4:12

Japan edition
No.	Title	Length
12.	"Lovesong" (uncensored version)	3:31
13.	"Lovesong" (music video)	3:43
14.	"Obsession (I Love You)" (music video)

Australian second disc DVD
No.	Title	Length
1.	"Lovesong" (censored music video)	3:28
2.	"Obsession (I Love You)" (music video)	3:43
3.	"Lovesong" (Monument mix)	4:37
4.	"Obsession (I Love You)" (Rogue Traders Denim Tribute mix)	7:16
5.	"Obsession (I Love You)" (Infusion Underground mix)	8:37

== Charts ==
Chart (2003)	Peak position
Australian ARIA Albums Chart	17
Chart (2004)	Peak position
Japan Albums Chart	20

== Certifications ==
Region	Certification	Certified units/sales
Australia (ARIA)	Gold	35,000^{^}
^{^} Shipments figures based on certification alone.

== Release history ==
Region	Date	Label	Format	Catalogue
Australia	18 August 2003	Festival Records	CD	336352
Japan	11 February 2004	Sony Japan	CD	SICP-521
Germany	14 June 2004	Ministry of Sound	CD	?

== Personnel ==
- Josh Abrahams – drum programming, electric guitar, keyboard.
- Andy Baldwin – drum programming, keyboard.
- Stuart Crichton – drum programming (track 4).
- Amiel Daemion – drum programming (tracks 8 and 9).
- Andy Page – drum programming, electric guitar, keyboard.
- Krish Sharma – drum programming (track 11).
