= FSOM =

FSOM may refer to:

- Future Sound of Melbourne, an electronic music trio from Australia, formed in 1990.
- Federated States of Micronesia, an island country in Oceania
- Frost School of Music
