= Tracklib =

Music service

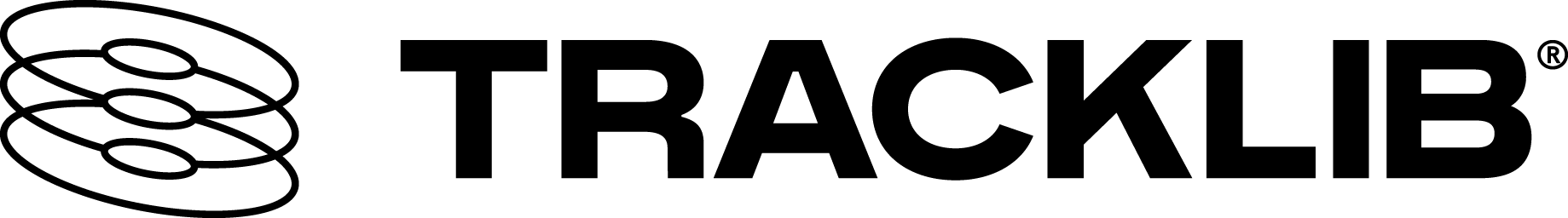
- Company type: Music licensing, music sampling
- Available in: English
- Founded: 2014
- Country of origin: Stockholm, Sweden
- Area served: Worldwide
- Industry: Music
- Website: tracklib.com
- Launched: 2018
- Current status: Active
- Written in: C#, JavaScript

Tracklib (short for Trackliberation) is a Swedish music service that allows producers to sample original music and clear the samples for official use. The platform was founded with the aim to solve legal and ethical issues surrounding sampling and music clearances. The platform has been previously used to sample and clear tracks for commercial releases by J. Cole, Lil Wayne, DJ Khaled, Mary J Blige, Brockhampton, A-Reece among others.

== History ==
Tracklib is based in Stockholm, Sweden, and was originally founded in 2014. After an invite-only beta version in 2017, the music service officially launched to the public in April 2018. In May 2020, Tracklib changed their service to a subscription model.

On 20 May 2025, Tracklib released a mobile app for their service.

== Services ==
The catalog of Tracklib consists of original master recordings and stems. Each track is part of one out of three tiers (Category A, B, or C) which each its purchase and clearance costs. Users can browse and hear all music before downloading it in WAV-format to use in a digital audio workstation (DAW) such as Ableton, Reason, or FL Studio. In 2019, Tracklib developed and launched a technology for users to select and preview loops. Tracklib functions as an intermediary between record labels, publishers, copyright owners, and artists. This allows users to clear all music and purchase a license for official usage of the selected recording(s). The difference with other music services such as Splice and Loopmasters, is that Tracklib only includes original master recordings and stems. All music is previously released and no royalty-free sounds or sample packs are available on Tracklib.

== Catalog ==
Original master recordings on Tracklib include music from artists such as Bob James, Louis Armstrong, Billie Holiday, Sly and Robbie, Ray Charles, across genres such as jazz, R&B/soul, reggae, classical music, rock music, and hip hop. The catalog also includes previously unreleased recordings by Isaac Hayes.

== Releases ==
- J. Cole – "Middle Child" (6× platinum)
- ¥$ (Kanye West and Ty Dolla Sign) – "Burn"
- DJ Khaled – "Holy Mountain"
- Brockhampton – "Dearly Departed"
- Lil Wayne – "Harden"
- Fred Again – "Leavemealone"
- Nas – "WTF SMH"
- Drake – "Stories About My Brother"
- Nicki Minaj – "Super Freaky Girl"
- Mary J. Blige – "Know"
- Phantogram – Ceremony
- Vic Mensa – "Let U Know"

Other notable artists with songs containing Tracklib samples are Firebeatz, A-Trak, Young M.A, $NOT & Statik Selektah.

== Advisory board ==
Tracklib's advisory board consists of producers Prince Paul, Erick Sermon, and Drumma Boy, later joined by producer Zaytoven in 2018 and Scott Storch in 2020. Former Spotify executives Petra Hansson and Niklas Ivarsson joined the advisory board in 2019.

== See also ==
- Loopmasters
- Splice (platform)
- Grooveshark
- AccuRadio
