= Megan Dorman =

Irish-born Australian actress

- Born: 1977 (age 47–48); Ballintra, Republic of Ireland

Megan Dorman (born 1977) is an Irish-born Australian actress who is best known for her role as Katherine Ingram in the series, Head Start. She had a small role in Queen of the Damned, playing Maudy, one of Lestat's band members. Dorman also features in the video for Puretone's Addicted to Bass single from 2001. Megan also played the role of Meg alongside fellow Aussie actress Leeanna Walsman in the mini-series Jessica, based on the novel by Bryce Courtenay.

== Filmography ==
=== Film ===
Year	Title	Role	Type
2000	City Loop (aka Bored Olives)	Stacey	Independent feature film
2002	Queen of the Damned	Maudy	Feature film

=== Television ===
Year	Title	Role	Type
2001	Head Start	Katherine Ingram	TV series
2004	Jessica	Meg Bergman	Miniseries, based on the novel by Bryce Courtenay

=== Music videos ===
Year	Artist	Video
2001	Puretone	Addicted to Bass
