= Future Music =

British electronic music magazine

- Cover of the final issue (414)
- Categories: Music
- Frequency: Monthly
- Publisher: Future plc
- First issue: November 1992
- Final issue Number: September 2024; 414
- Country: United Kingdom
- Language: English
- Website: futuremusic.co.uk (archived)

Future Music (stylised as FutureMusic) was a monthly music magazine, published by Future plc in the UK between 1992 and 2024. It was aimed primarily at record producers working in the electronic music field.

Future Music included hardware and software reviews, tutorials, royalty-free samples and loops, and music by electronic artists. The magazine also had reviews of commercial releases within the electronic genre, regularly naming its "Album of the Month". Interviewees included Aphex Twin, Grimes and Gary Numan, who appeared on the cover of the first issue. Future Music content was reprinted by outlets including The Fader, Amiga Format and Loopmasters.

The journalist and broadcaster Dave Haslam characterised Future Music as "a specialist mag for techno boffins". Matt Feeney in The Lance recognised the publication as one of the best within electronic music, saying that it was "intended not so much for the fans of electronic music as... for the artists themselves".

Publication ceased on 26 September 2024 with the release of issue 414. Future Music advised that its "expert knowledge, writing and opinions" would continue via MusicRadar, an online Future plc property dedicated to musicians.
