= Live Before I Die =

Live Before I Die may refer to:

- "Live Before I Die", a song by the Corrs from their 2017 album Jupiter Calling
- "Live Before I Die", a song by the Matrix from their 2009 album The Matrix
