= Samplify =

Australian music production company

s:amplify
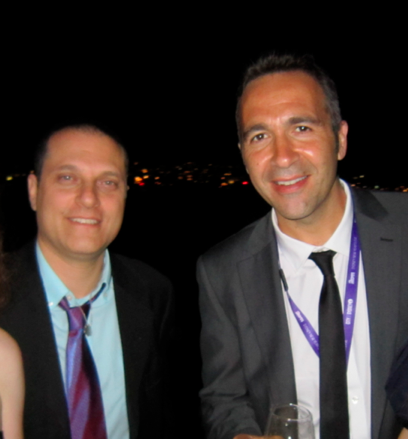

Background information
- Origin: Melbourne
- Genres: House, techno, drum and bass, dubstep, pop, video game music
- Years active: 2009–present
- Labels: Intec Digital, Warner Music, Brownswood Recordings, Rendezvous Music, The Little Idiot
- Members: Davide Carbone; Josh Abrahams
- Website: samplify.com.au

s:amplify is an Australian music production house formed by Davide Carbone and Josh Abrahams who have collectively been producing and composing music since the late 1980s. Together they have won three ARIA Awards and produced several worldwide chart topping hits. s:amplify have also been responsible for the composition and sound design for several synthesizers, TV, film and video game projects.

== Background ==
In 1990, Abrahams and Carbone formed the techno group, Future Sound of Melbourne with acid house DJ Steve Robbins. They released 12" singles on Shock Records. Future Sound of Melbourne also released tracks on Two Thumbs Records, with the Thomas Heckmann remix of their track "Welcome" featured on the inaugural IF? Records compilation Zeitgeist. Future Sound of Melbourne won the ARIA Award for "Best Dance Release" for their Chapter One album in 1996.

After enjoying successful individual careers in the Music industry Abrahams and Carbone reformed under the moniker of s:amplify in 2009.

== 2009-present: s:amplify ==
Under the s:amplify moniker Abrahams and Carbone teamed with Carl Cox to co-write and co-produce Cox's artist album All Roads Lead to the Dancefloor, released in 2011. This trio also provided remixes for Moby, Miguel Bosé and Gilles Peterson, among others. As s:amplify, Carbone and Abrahams provided complete sonic branding packages for Melbourne TV network Channel 31, and the Melbourne public transport company Metro Trains Melbourne, as well as composing music for Tourism Australia, Alienware, Ford, Jaguar Cars, and the International Cricket Council. s:amplify have also produced songs for various artists including the cover version of Wuthering Heights by Robyn Loau.

In 2011, s:amplify were featured on the front cover of the April issue of Music Tech magazine. They released two sound design packs through Loopmasters which have received positive reviews. They also provided the sound design for the Japanese synthesizer KDJ One They were appointed musical directors for the City of Sydney New Year's Eve fireworks show. The 2011/2012 12-minute NYE Fireworks extravaganza on Sydney Harbour showcased 24 Australian songs including original compositions from Carbone and Abrahams. s:amplify were again appointed musical directors for the 2012/2013 Sydney New Year's Eve fireworks show where they worked alongside Kylie Minogue to produce the 12-minute soundtrack for the show, which culminated in a music composition that featured exclusive content from Kylie. Carbone and Abrahams also created the 30-minute soundtrack for the International Fleet Review. They worked closely alongside the Royal Australian Navy Band to create the soundtrack.
