= Obsession (I Love You) =

Single by Amiel

from the album Audio Out
- Released: 30 June 2003
- Length: 3:53
- Label: Festival Mushroom
- Songwriters: Amiel Daemion; Lauren Christy; Graham Edwards; David Scott Alspach
- Producer: Josh G. Abrahams

Amiel singles chronology
"Lovesong" (2003)	"Obsession (I Love You)" (2003)	"Tonight" (2003)

"Obsession (I Love You)" is a song by American-Australian pop singer Amiel, released as the second single from her debut studio album, Audio Out (2003). According to Amiel, the song went through many changes, eventually becoming a dark-sounding track that illustrates the narrator's obsessive tendencies. Released as a single on 30 June 2003, "Obsession" peaked at number 15 on the Australian Singles Chart.

== Background ==
Amiel said of "Obsession": "The song went through many changes and has had many lives. In the end it [the song] took on a kind of Nine Inch Nails vibe. That's what Josh is like. He becomes obsessed and driven toward a particular thing and in this song that is what he wanted. It totally works for this song to be dark and strange because it helps illustrate the obsessive, deluded character that I am playing."

As the song was cowritten with production group The Matrix, a cover of it later appeared on the group's self titled debut album. This version features vocals from British vocalist Adam Longlands and pre-fame American popstar Katy Perry.

== Track listing ==
Australian CD single

1. "Obsession (I Love You)" (original version)
2. "Obsession (I Love You)" (alternate radio mix)
3. "Obsession (I Love You)" (Rogue Traders Denim Tribute mix)
4. "Obsession (I Love You)" (Infusion underground club mix)

== Charts ==
=== Weekly charts ===
Chart (2003)	Peak position
Australia (ARIA)	15

=== Year-end charts ===
Chart (2003)	Position
Australian Artists (ARIA)	20
