= Mixtape (video game) =

2026 video game

- Developers: Beethoven & Dinosaur
- Publisher: Annapurna Interactive
- Director: Johnny Galvatron
- Programmers: Justin Blackwell; Geordie Hall
- Writer: Johnny Galvatron
- Composer: Josh Abrahams
- Engine: Unreal Engine 5
- Platforms: Nintendo Switch 2; PlayStation 5; Windows; Xbox Series X/S
- Release: 7 May 2026
- Genre: Adventure
- Mode: Single-player

Mixtape is an adventure game developed by Beethoven & Dinosaur and published by Annapurna Interactive for Nintendo Switch 2, PlayStation 5, Windows and Xbox Series X/S, released on 7 May 2026. It follows a group of teenage friends on their last day together before going their separate ways, set to a curated playlist of tracks chosen by the protagonist Stacey Rockford. Game director Johnny Galvatron drew narrative inspiration from the films of John Hughes, formulating the three main characters after the 1990s era of Hughes' films. Beethoven & Dinosaur acquired the license to several of Galvatron's favorite songs to incorporate into its levels, including music by Devo, Smashing Pumpkins, Iggy Pop, and Joy Division.

Critics largely praised Mixtape, particularly for its narrative elements and references to 1990s America. It received criticism from players over the limited gameplay and short run-time, with some accusing the game's positive critical reviews of being part of an astroturfing campaign.

== Gameplay and plot ==
Mixtape is a narrative adventure game, following the character of teenager Stacey Rockford and her friends, Van Slater and Cassandra "Cass" Morino. Besides cutscenes, the player follows events as well as learns the backstories of these characters through playable vignettes throughout the game, such as skateboarding down a hilly road, slinging rocks across a pond, or exploring a run-down dinosaur park.

Stacey, Slater, and Cassandra live in the fictional northern California town of Blue Moon Lagoon in the 1990s; Stacey and Van have known each other since they were kids, while Cassandra—the daughter of the local police chief—joined them during high school, seeking to be rebellious against her strict parents. Following the last days of high school, Stacey, an aspiring music supervisor, has arranged to fly to New York City to catch a break for her dream job that she just learned about, cancelling a planned road trip she was going to take with her friends. Believing she will never return to Blue Moon Lagoon, Stacey has planned to spend the last day before the morning flight with Slater and Cassandra in preparing for a large party to be thrown by Camille Cole that night. Stacey frequently breaks the fourth wall to explain to the player that she has chosen the perfect track list for this day and introduces each song as it starts.

They spend the day milling about town and at Stacey's bedroom, reminiscing about the past, when they realize they need to find some alcohol to bring to the party. Ransacking Stacey's older sister's bedroom, they find clues leading to "The Ritz", a dilapidated, abandoned shack in the woods that they have hung out at. On their way there they stop at Cassandra's home, where Cassandra's dad returns, revealing that he knows there is something going on that evening and grounds Cassandra against her wishes, and also insists that she must attend a college much closer to home, considering Stacey and Slater to be a bad influence in her life.

Stacey and Slater go to the Ritz and through more clues from Stacey's sister, find a large stash of alcohol and fireworks. As they relax, Cassandra arrives along with Jenny Goodspeed, another student who Stacey dislikes since Cassandra has separately hung out with her. Stacey pulls Cassandra aside and learns that she and Slater are still planning on the road trip but are taking Jenny along instead, since Stacey had selfishly abandoned them for her New York City trip without any notice. They get into an argument, and Cassandra leaves with Jenny to go drinking near a local convenience store, leaving Stacey shocked. They head to Slater's home while Stacey comes to realize what she has done. While there, Cassandra's dad comes to warn Slater's mom about breaking up a large party that was planned and that she should keep Slater home. Stacey overhears that he will be checking out some teenage delinquents at the convenience store, and races ahead of him to warn Jenny away and hide Cassandra, instead presenting herself as the delinquent. Slater arrives, helps to distract Cassandra's dad, and the three of them flee.

As they distance themselves from the store, they are met by a caravan of cars led by Camille, asking if they know a place to hold a party since their plans were busted. Stacey directs them to the Ritz, and the party ensues, while Stacey and Cassandra reconcile. A misplaced firework causes the shack to catch fire, ending the party, and as the police arrive, Stacey, Slater, and Cassandra make to leave, but Cassandra decides to stay back, telling her father she had set the shack on fire as an act of defiance against her parents' strict upbringing, which she will continue to rebel if they hold her back. Her father acknowledges they have an understanding, and lets Cassandra go while the other police arrive. The three return home, and say their last goodbyes, letting go of their pasts as they go their separate ways.

== Development ==
Melbourne-based studio Beethoven & Dinosaur had previously developed a music-themed platforming title The Artful Escape, also published by Annapurna Interactive and released in 2021. Johnny Galvatron, the game's director, had been the lead of the band The Galvatrons until 2017, when he left to form Beethoven & Dinosaur. After The Artful Escape, Galvatron had the idea of basing a game on Devo's "That's Good", which led to expanding to creating a mixtape of Galvatron's "greatest hits of all time". Galvatron described the feel of the game as "sorta like channel-surfing [old-school] MTV at 3 AM".

Galvatron wanted to take a more narrative approach for Mixtape compared to The Artful Escape; the studio listed out his favourite songs and "arrange them in different ways" to "see what story it can tell" based on musical crescendos and lulls to form a narrative. After creating a horizontal slice of the game to roughly map out how Mixtape's story outline, the studio searched for new songs to add to moments lacking emotional weight or designed moments around a certain song choice. They also wanted to make sure that the interactive sequences set to each song paid tribute to that song, rather than just background music.

From the narrative side, Galvatron was inspired by the films of John Hughes, and said that within the films, "these characters are always at the point where things are about to change that can never be changed back". Other films that influenced the game included Wayne's World, High Fidelity, and Dazed and Confused. Galvatron formulated the three main characters of the 1990s era of Hughes films, with Slater representing the late 80s-early 90s, Stacey the mid-90s, and Cassandra the late 90s.

Among the licensed artists in the game include Devo, Smashing Pumpkins, Iggy Pop, Joy Division, and more. They were able to license nearly every song that they had selected at the start of development, with the only major exception being Pink Floyd. The studio assured the licensing rights for these songs would last for decades to avoid problems with potential delisting. The studio opted not to include a streamer mode in Mixtape to remove copyrighted audio as the licensed music was "the soul of Mixtape"; the characters discuss the songs during several scenes, and the game's "levels are designed around the songs".

Mixtape features stop motion-inspired animation. The Guardian compared Mixtape's art direction to the animation style featured in Spider-Man: Into the Spider-Verse (2018).

== Release ==
At Summer Games Fest 2025, Mixtape was confirmed to be releasing on Xbox Game Pass. The game was initially targeting a 2025 release. In November 2025, it was delayed to 2026, as announced by the developer via its social media accounts.

During Nintendo's Indie World Showcase on 3 March 2026, it was announced that the game would launch on 7 May 2026 and a release for Nintendo Switch 2 was confirmed.

== Reception ==
Reception

Aggregate scores
Aggregator	Score
Metacritic	(NS2) 81/100 (PC) 87/100 (PS5) 86/100 (XSXS) 92/100
OpenCritic	93% recommend

Review scores
Publication	Score
Game Informer	9/10
GameSpot	9/10
GamesRadar+	4/5
Hardcore Gamer	4/5
IGN	10/10
Nintendo Life	9/10
PC Gamer (US)	74/100
Push Square	9/10
Shacknews	9/10
The Guardian	3/5
Video Games Chronicle	5/5

Mixtape received "generally favorable" reviews for the Nintendo Switch 2, Windows, and PlayStation 5 versions while the Xbox Series X/S version received "critical acclaim" according to the review aggregation website Metacritic. Review aggregator OpenCritic assessed that the game received "Mighty" approval, being recommended by 97% of critics.

Simon Cardy of IGN gave the game a perfect score of 10/10, writing that the game "sets a new standard for coming-of-age stories in video games and does so with a masterful sense of style". The editorial team of IGN France gave the game a score of 7/10, saying Mixtape's strengths were its narrative and references to 1990s American culture as reflected in its musical and visual style, but its biggest flaws was being too linear, often lacking any player interaction and feeling more like an "anecdotal" experience.

Tom Regan of The Guardian gave the game three out of five stars, opining that the game had lower stakes than Life Is Strange. Oli Welsh of Polygon, while praising the game's music and presentation, said the story "doesn't feel personal", using a well-known and recognized setting of 1990s America instead of using Galvatron's own Australian background. Welsh contrasted Mixtape to Despelote, a similar slice-of-life game that he felt came across more personal about the developer's own experiences. Harvey Randall of PC Gamer criticized and described Mixtape as a "good movie" instead of a game.

=== Players' response ===
While Mixtape received generally positive reviews from critics, some players have questioned the high scores it received. They were critical of its limited gameplay, considering it more of an interactive film or "walking simulator" than a traditional video game. The game's approximately three- to four-hour runtime consists of cutscenes, vignette-style sequences, and minigames with limited or no fail states. Some players also said the game was too short. There were complaints about the writing, such as heavy reliance on 90s nostalgia, as well as in the character of Stacey, who some players felt was too selfish.

Some players suggested that the game was an industry plant by Annapurna Pictures' Megan Ellison. Such claims took issue with the relationship between Megan and her father Larry Ellison, and claimed that Mixtape's positive reviews were part of an astroturfing campaign based off lower scores given to other games released around the same time.

Some critics, such as Harvey Randall of PC Gamer and Nathan Grayson of Aftermath, suggest that the backlash towards Mixtape is a result of modern-day culture war discourse, with Grayson drawing parallels between it and a resurgence of Gamergate-esque discourse and harassment. Randall said of the game and its discourse: "Mixtape's a game about nostalgia. That's it. That's as complicated as it gets."

=== Awards ===
Year	Award	Category	Result	Ref.
2026	Golden Joystick Awards	Best Indie Game	Nominated	
2026	Golden Joystick Awards	Best Soundtrack	Nominated	
2026	Australian Game Developers' Awards	Game of the Year	Won	
2026	Australian Game Developers' Awards	Excellence in Art	Won	
2026	Australian Game Developers' Awards	Excellence in Sound Design	Won	
2026	The Game Awards 2026	Games for Impact	Pending	
2026	The Game Awards 2026	Best Score and Music	Pending	
