= Apocalypse Now (soundtrack) =

1979 film soundtrack album

Apocalypse Now (Original Motion Picture Soundtrack)

Film score by Francis Ford Coppola and Carmine Coppola
- Released: 1979
- Venues: San Francisco; San Rafael; Los Angeles
- Studios: The Automatt; Omni Zoetrope Studios; Different Fur Studios; Club Front; CBS Studio Center
- Genre: Film score
- Length: 86:47
- Label: Elektra
- Producer: David Rubinson

Carmine Coppola chronology
Mustang: The House That Joe Built (1977)	Apocalypse Now (1979)	The Black Stallion (1979)

Apocalypse Now (Original Motion Picture Soundtrack) is the film score to the 1979 war film Apocalypse Now, directed by Francis Ford Coppola. The music was written by Carmine Coppola and Francis Ford Coppola.

The production of the score was a turbulent process. Isao Tomita, who was the initial choice for writing the music, could not work on the project due to label contracts. Later, David Shire was hired to score the synthesizer-based music, and had recorded most of the tracks. But because of the film's production being stalled, Shire focused on other projects, which led to Francis ousting him from the project and having his father Carmine Coppola take over the scoring duties. Francis assisted him in arranging and compiling the score, and David Rubinson produced it. The album was released by Elektra Records in 1979.

== History ==
Francis determined a heavily synthesized score over an orchestra as it had an inherent coldness to it. Initially, Japanese composer Isao Tomita was hired to write the score and had demanded the film's soundtrack to sound like Tomita's electronic adaptation of The Planets by Gustav Holst. Despite Tomita went to Philippines to accompany the film's crew, label contracts ultimately prevented his involvement. Eventually, David Shire was brought forward to replace Tomita.

Following his involvement, Shire began drafting ideas for recording it at the CBS Studio Center (now known as Radford Studio Center). He did not want the synthesizers to emulate strings, brass and woodwinds, but instead hear imaginary instruments with novel tones. Shire the wrote down rough descriptions of sounds he wanted such as a "celeste with gong ring-off" or a "scumbone" which resembled a dirty, huge trombone. Despite Shire's experience in writing synths for years, he never learnt to program one, which resulted in him collaborating with Dan Wyman to make the synthesizers generate the sounds that Shire imagined.

But although Shire had been writing for synths for years, he had never learned how to program one, much less a whole ensemble of them. For that he turned to Dan Wyman, a musician itching to change the way most people heard synthesizers. Wyman's job was to figure out how to make the massive synthesizers generate the sounds Shire heard in his head. Because of the film's production issues—due to a hurricane in Philippines and casting disputes—Apocalypse Now was stalled temporarily which led Shire to focus on Norma Rae.

Francis being disappointed with Shire's decision, ousted him from the project, and hired his father Carmine who wrote the score from scratch. Though Shire was devastated, he also understood on Francis facing difficulties through this project, admitting that they were working in a sanitized, quiet and safe environment. Francis also co-composed the film score, in his only attempt as a composer, compiling music cues, while the score was produced by David Rubinson. The score was released in 1979 under the Elektra Records label, featuring compilation of Carmine and Francis' score as well as songs performed by The Doors and Flash Cadillac amongst others.

== Reception ==
M. F. Dibella of AllMusic stated "On a whole it's an unconventional soundtrack; rather, it's a facsimile of many of the film's crucial scenes and an auditory synopsis of a phenomenal cinematic experience." Reviewing the multiple score releases, Filmtracks stated "[Francis Ford] Coppola's score for Apocalypse Now is well regarded but doesn't exude the same innovation that comes from Shire's more challenging take using the same technology [...] score-only albums, whether from 1988 or 2001, are more satisfying but expose strategic flaws in the music's narrative. The rejected Shire score was released on a limited album in 2017 and is an intellectual treat but largely impossible to enjoy as music. Neither score is particularly attractive outside of context, leaving the music in the film itself as your best option." Maria Elena of Debaser wrote "Music and direction highlight the merciless atrocities committed where the viewer will be fully involved. The entire complete representation is a disturbing oneiric work."

Reviewing Shire's version of the score, Tom Taylor of Far Out summarized "David Shire’s score, on the other hand, is an unabated hellscape. It is total nightmare fuel, like placing a conch to your ear and hearing the tortured scream of the underworld. The synth-scape is granted and chaotic as though Vangelis and Ennio Morricone had a lovechild called Lucifer and it was brought up listening to industrial music. It certainly captures the war is hell side of things, and it is a magnificently effective and original piece of work, but it might have been too disorientating, claustrophobic and droning to take in one long full blast of war."

== Track listing ==
No.	Title	Artist(s)	Length
1.	"The End" (originally produced by Paul A. Rothchild)	The Doors	4:15
2.	"Saigon" (narration and dialogue)		1:38
3.	"The End – Part 2" (originally produced by Paul A. Rothchild)	The Doors	1:37
4.	"Terminata" (narration and dialogue)		5:44
5.	"The Delta"		2:38
6.	"P. B. R." (narration and dialogue)		2:02
7.	"Dossier I"		1:51
8.	"Colonel Kilgore" (narration and dialogue)		5:43
9.	"Orange Light"		2:15
10.	"The Ride Of The Valkyries" (written by Richard Wagner)	Vienna Philharmonic Orchestra and Sir Georg Solti	2:00
11.	"Napalm In The Morning" (dialogue)		0:55
12.	"Pre-Tiger"		4:50
13.	"Dossier II"		3:30
14.	"Suzie Q" (written by Dale Hawkins, Eleanor Broadwater and Stanley Lewis)	Flash Cadillac	4:26
15.	"Dossier III"		3:09
16.	"75 Clicks" (dialogue)		1:09
17.	"The Nung River"		3:10
18.	"Do Lung Bridge"		9:37
19.	"Letter From Home"		2:39
20.	"Clean's Death"		3:10
21.	"Chief's Death / Strange Voyage"		6:47
22.	"Strange Voyage"		4:16
23.	"Kurtz' Compound" (dialogue)		2:18
24.	"Willard's Capture"		1:18
25.	"Errand Boy" (dialogue)		2:04
26.	"Chef's Head"		2:04
27.	"The Hollow Men" (written by T. S. Eliot)		1:09
28.	"Horror" (dialogue)		5:42
29.	"Even The Jungle Wanted Him Dead" (dialogue)		1:01
30.	"The End" (originally produced by Paul A. Rothchild)	The Doors	3:14
Total length:			86:47

== David Shire's version ==
On 28 November 2017, La-La Land Records released Shire's version of the film's score as Apocalypse Now: The Unused Score. The album accompanied 20 tracks of Shire's music recorded for the film, though not being used because of his exit from the project. Some of his score had been referenced in the 2026 video game Mixtape.

No.	Title	Length
1.	"Into the Jungle"	5:11
2.	"Delta"	2:26
3.	"Village Assault"	2:06
4.	"Hell-icopter"	2:48
5.	"Long Travel Dossier"	3:34
6.	"Dossier Reading 1"	2:35
7.	"Orange Light"	1:28
8.	"Tiger Tiger"	2:22
9.	"The French Plantation"	4:55
10.	"River Encounter"	2:26
11.	"The Lure of Kurtz"	5:26
12.	"Ho Fat Bridge"	2:33
13.	"Dossier Reading 2"	2:39
14.	"Kurtz Calling"	5:27
15.	"Ride of the Valkyries" (piano and synth demo)	0:41
16.	"Ride of the Valkyries" (studio version)	1:33
17.	"Delta Gongs Test"	2:11
18.	"Delta Ostinato Test"	2:38
19.	"The French Plantation" (no viola)	4:48
20.	"Kurtz's Compound"	1:25
Total length:		59:12

== The Apocalypse Now Sessions ==
Director Francis Ford Coppola asked Grateful Dead drummers Mickey Hart and Bill Kreutzmann to record percussion music for Apocalypse Now. Upon recording, they further collaborated with fellow percussionists Airto Moreira, Greg Errico, Jim Loveless and Jordan Amarantha and other instrumentalists, which involved bassist Phil Lesh, guitarist Mike Hinton and vocalist Flora Purim. Some of their music being improvised in the final edit of the soundtrack, while some selections were remixed and assembled into the album. The album The Apocalypse Now Sessions was credited to Hart and Kreutzmann's band The Rhythm Devils, and was released in 1980 under the Passport Records label.

== Apocalypse Now Redux ==
New scenes for the re-edited version Apocalypse Now Redux was scored by Ed Golfarb, who had been Francis' longtime associate, while much of the score was remastered for the edit. It was released through Nonesuch Records on July 31, 2001.
