= Stuck in a Groove =

Studio album by Puretone
- Released: 2002
- Genre: Electronic
- Label: Festival Mushroom
- Producer: Josh Abrahams

Josh Abrahams chronology
Sweet Distorted Holiday (1998)	Stuck in a Groove (2002)

Stuck in a Groove is the sole studio album released by Australian electronic music producer Josh G Abrahams under the alias Puretone. It was released in 2002 by record label Festival Mushroom in Australia, V2 in the US and Sony in the UK. It contains Puretone's 1998 top-20 single "Addicted to Bass" and features collaborations with Amiel Daemion, Dan the Automator and Paul Mac.

The album includes a number of tracks from Abraham's 1998 album, Sweet Distorted Holiday.

== Reception ==
Billboard described the album as "musically diverse [...] revelling in drum and bass, techno, chilled out ambience, and left-of-center pop".

Richard M. Juzwiak of CMJ New Music Monthly wrote: "Groove excites because it sprawls, not only over the course of the tracks, but within them, suggesting that Abrahams is anything but stuck."

== Track listing ==
No.	Title	Length
1.	"(Intro) Thrillseeker"	4:06
2.	"Headroom"	3:25
3.	"Addicted to Bass"	3:56
4.	"Keep On"	4:02
5.	"Hypersensitive"	4:52
6.	"Stuck in a Groove"	3:16
7.	"A Linear Model"	2:54
8.	"Lift Me Up"	4:22
9.	"Breakup Song"	3:47
10.	"Echoes"	4:46
11.	"Headroom Reprise"	4:05
12.	"1 and 9"	8:31
