= Lovesong (Amiel song) =

2003 single by Amiel

Single by Amiel

from the album Audio Out
- B-side: "Games We Play"
- Released: 10 March 2003
- Length: 3:32
- Label: Festival Mushroom
- Songwriter: Amiel Daemion
- Producer: Josh Abrahams

Amiel singles chronology
"The Chase" (2000)	"Lovesong" (2003)	"Obsession (I Love You)" (2003)

"Lovesong" is a song written by American-Australian singer Amiel and produced by Josh Abrahams for Amiel's album, Audio Out (2003). It was released as the album's first single in Australia as a CD single on 10 March 2003. The song was nominated for two awards at the 2003 ARIA Awards: Highest Selling Single and Single of the Year.

The video shows a split screen of Amiel and a man who both enter a restaurant and sit down. Part way through, they both go to the bathroom and end up coming out on the opposite side of the screen and finish sitting at each other's seat and being brought the other's meal.

== Background and commercial performance ==
Amiel wrote the song in 1999 when she first moved to Sydney. She states "I went out with this guy, it was three dates, just dinners, it was so irrelevant, it was completely nothing. I was new in town and I wanted something, someone. But it was a waste of time. I thought: great, all I got out of that was a love song, another fucking love song." Amiel states that the lyrics were changed to "stupid Lovesong" for radio because "stupid" preserves the sentiment better than a beep.

"Lovesong" was commercially successful in Australia. On its first week of release to radio, it became the most added song to Australian radio for that week. In March 2003, it debuted at number 13 on the Australian ARIA Singles Chart, and within five weeks of its release, it had reached the top 10, becoming Amiel's first top-10 single. The single spent 26 weeks on the ARIA Singles Chart, 17 of which were in the top 50. The song went to become Australia's 34th-highest-selling single for 2003, and the Australian Recording Industry Association (ARIA) awarded the single a platinum certification for shipping 70,000 copies. The same year, the song was nominated for two ARIA Awards: the Highest Selling Single and Single of the Year, losing in both categories to "Born to Try" by Delta Goodrem.

== Legacy ==
In 2023, The Sydney Morning Herald named the track the greatest Australian pop song of the 21st century, stating "it's not simply criminally underrated, it's perfect....It's a track that feels so fresh and original today, a decidedly modern earworm brimming with cutting lyrics and bubbling vulnerability. Amiel's voice is lilting and captivating, and the chorus is an absolute banger."

== Track listings ==
Australian CD single

1. "Lovesong"
2. "Lovesong" (censored)
3. "Lovesong" (MONUMENT remix)
4. "Games We Play"

German CD single

1. "Lovesong" – 3:32
2. "Lovesong" (censored radio version) – 3:33
3. "Lovesong" (Scumfrog remix edit) – 3:47
4. "Lovesong" (Scumfrog club mix) – 8:39
5. "Lovesong" (video) – 3:32

== Charts ==
=== Weekly charts ===
Chart (2003–2004)	Peak position
Australia (ARIA)	6
Germany (GfK)	75

=== Year-end charts ===
Chart (2003)	Position
Australia (ARIA)	34

== Certifications ==
Region	Certification	Certified units/sales
Australia (ARIA)	Platinum	70,000^{^}
^{^} Shipments figures based on certification alone.

== Release history ==
Region	Date	Format	Label	Catalogue	Ref.
Australia	10 March 2003	CD	Festival Mushroom	021062	
Germany	26 April 2004	CD	Ministry of Sound	0000025MIN	
