= Laser Graffiti =

Studio album by The Galvatrons
- Released: 3 July 2009
- Genres: Rock; electronica; power pop
- Length: 39:18
- Label: Warner
- Producers: Scott Horscroft; Steve Smart

The Galvatrons chronology
When We Were Kids (2008)	Laser Graffiti (2009)

Singles from Laser Graffiti
- 1. "Cassandra" Released: 6 April 2009; 2. "She's in Love" Released: 3 July 2009

Laser Graffiti is the debut studio album by the Australian rock group The Galvatrons. Originally due for release in April 2009, the release date was pushed back to 3 July 2009. It was the follow-up to the band's previous release, the When We Were Kids EP, released the year prior in 2008.

== Track listing ==
1. "And So They Invade..." – 1:12
2. "The First Starfighter" – 3:52
3. "Cassandra" – 3:26
4. "We Were Kids" – 3:56
5. "Robots Are Cool" – 3:55
6. "Laser Graffiti" – 3:27
7. "Light Speed" – 3:25
8. "Stella" – 3:35
9. "She's in Love" – 3:43
10. "Molotov Cocktail" – 4:15
11. "Galaxy Destroyer" – 4:32

iTunes Australia bonus tracks

12. "Cassandra" (acoustic version) – 3:14
13. "X-Ray Spex" – 3:41

== Personnel ==
- Johnny "Galvatron" – lead vocals, guitar
- Robert Convery "Bozza" – drums, percussion
- Pete "Gamma" – keyboard, backing vocals
- Pete Convery "Condor" – bass, backing vocals

== Charts ==
Chart performance for Laser Graffiti
Chart (2009)	Peak position
Australian Albums (ARIA)	61
