= 2003 ARIA Music Awards =

Annual Australian music awards ceremony

- Date: 21 October 2003
- Venue: Sydney Superdome, Sydney, New South Wales

Highlights
- Most wins: Delta Goodrem (7)
- Most nominations: Delta Goodrem (13)
- Website: ariaawards.com.au

Television/radio coverage
- Network: Network Ten

The 17th Annual Australian Recording Industry Association Music Awards (generally known as the ARIA Music Awards) were held on 21 October 2003 at the Sydney Superdome. The ceremony aired on Network Ten.

== Awards ==
Winners highlighted in bold, with nominees, in plain, below them.

=== ARIA Awards ===
- Album of the Year
  - **Powderfinger** – **Vulture Street**
    - Delta Goodrem – Innocent Eyes
    - The Sleepy Jackson – Lovers
    - Something for Kate – The Official Fiction
    - The Waifs – Up All Night
- Single of the Year
  - **Delta Goodrem – "Born to Try"**
    - Amiel – "Lovesong"
    - Powderfinger – "(Baby I've Got You) On My Mind"
    - Silverchair – "Luv Your Life"
    - The Waifs – "Lighthouse"
- Best Male Artist
  - **Alex Lloyd – "Coming Home"**
    - Ben Lee – Hey You. Yes You.
    - John Butler – Living
    - Nick Cave – Nocturama
    - Tex Perkins – Sweet Nothing
- Best Female Artist
  - **Delta Goodrem – Innocent Eyes**
    - Amiel – Audio Out
    - Kylie Minogue – "Come into My World"
    - Renée Geyer – Tenderland
    - Sarah Blasko - Prelusive EP ("Your Way")
- Best Group
  - **Powderfinger** – **Vulture Street**
    - Grinspoon – "No Reason"
    - Silverchair – "Across the Night"
    - Something for Kate – The Official Fiction
    - The Waifs – Up All Night
- Highest-Selling Single
  - **Delta Goodrem – "Born to Try"**
    - Amiel – "Lovesong"
    - The Androids – "Do It with Madonna"
    - Delta Goodrem – "Innocent Eyes"
    - Delta Goodrem – "Lost Without You"
- Highest-Selling Album
  - **Delta Goodrem – Innocent Eyes**
    - John Farnham – The Last Time
    - Kasey Chambers – Barricades & Brickwalls
    - Powderfinger – Vulture Street
    - Silverchair – Diorama
- Breakthrough Artist – Single
  - **Delta Goodrem – "Born to Try"**
    - Candice Alley – "Falling"
    - The Casanovas – "Shake It"
    - Rogue Traders – "One of My Kind"
    - The Sleepy Jackson – "Vampire Racecourse"
- Breakthrough Artist – Album
  - **Delta Goodrem – Innocent Eyes**
    - Amiel – Audio Out
    - Pete Murray – Feeler
    - The Sleepy Jackson – Lovers
    - The Waifs – Up All Night
- Best Independent Release
  - **The Waifs – Up All Night**
    - 1200 Techniques – "Eye of the Storm"
    - Diesel – Hear
    - John Butler Trio – Living
    - The Mess Hall – Feeling Sideways
- Best Adult Contemporary Album
  - **John Farnham – The Last Time**
    - Blackeyed Susans – Shangri-La
    - David Bridie – Hotel Radio
    - The Go-Betweens – Bright Yellow Bright Orange
    - Renée Geyer – Tenderland
- Best Rock Album
  - **Powderfinger – Vulture Street**
    - Magic Dirt – Tough Love
    - Nick Cave and the Bad Seeds – Nocturama
    - The Sleepy Jackson – Lovers
    - Something for Kate – The Official Fiction
- Best Country Album
  - **Keith Urban – Golden Road**
    - Adam Harvey – Cowboy Dreams
    - Beccy Cole – Little Victories
    - Bill Chambers – Sleeping with the Blues
    - Sara Storer – Beautiful Circle
- Best Blues & Roots Album
  - **The Waifs – Up All Night**
    - John Butler Trio – Living
    - Mia Dyson – Cold Water
    - Pete Murray – Feeler
    - The Revelators – The Revelators
- Best Pop Release
  - **Delta Goodrem – Innocent Eyes**
    - Amiel – Audio Out
    - The Androids – "Do It with Madonna"
    - Dannii Minogue – Neon Nights
    - Kylie Minogue – "Come into My World"
- Best Dance Release
  - **Rogue Traders – "One of My Kind"**
    - 1200 Techniques – "Eye of the Storm"
    - Disco Montego – Disco Montego
    - Gerling – "Who's Ya Daddy?"
    - Wicked Beat Sound System – New Soul Breaks
- Best Children's Album
  - **Hi-5 – Celebrate**
    - Play School – Hip Hip Hooray
    - The Saddle Club – On Top of the World
    - The Wiggles - Go to Sleep Jeff!
    - The Wiggles - Whoo Hoo! Wiggly Gremlins!
- Best Comedy Release
  - **Merrick and Rosso – From Us to Youse**
    - Dave Hughes – Whatever
    - The Drugs – Music's in Trouble
    - Rodney Rude – Rude Bastard
    - Tripod – About an Hour of Song in an Hour

=== Artisan Awards ===
- Best Cover Art
  - **Steven Gorrow, Revolution Design – Powderfinger – Vulture Street**
    - Jenny Sullivan, Sony Music Design – Delta Goodrem – Innocent Eyes
    - Adalita, Steven Gorrow – Magic Dirt – Tough Love
    - Stephanie Ashworth & David Homer, Sony Music Design – Something for Kate – The Official Fiction
    - James Bellesini, Love Police – You Am I – Deliverance
- Engineer of the Year
  - **Chris Thompson – The Waifs – Up All Night**
    - Vince Pizzinga – Delta Goodrem – Innocent Eyes
    - David Leonard – The Butterfly Effect – Begins Here
    - Lindsay Gravina – Magic Dirt – Tough Love
    - Paul McKercher – Pete Murray – Feeler
- Best Video
  - **Bart Borghesi – The Androids – "Do It with Madonna"**
    - Paul Butler, Scott Walton & 50 / 50 Films – Gerling – "Who's Ya Daddy?"
    - Paul Butler, Scott Walton & 50 / 50 Films – Powderfinger – "(Baby I've Got You) On My Mind"
    - Sam Bennetts, Rising Sun Pictures – Rogue Traders – "One of My Kind"
    - Sean Gilligan & Sarah-Jane Woulahan – Silverchair – "Across the Night"
- Producer of the Year
  - **Chris Thompson – The Waifs – Up All Night**
    - David Nicholas – Delta Goodrem – Innocent Eyes
    - Jonathan Burnside – The Sleepy Jackson – Lovers
    - Magoo – Gerling – Bad Blood
    - Paul McKercher – Pete Murray – Feeler

=== Fine Arts Awards ===
- Best World Music Album
  - **Monsieur Camembert – Absynthe**
    - All India Radio – All India Radio
    - David Bridie – West Papua: Sound of the Morning Star
    - Kavisha Mazzella – Silverhook Tango
    - Zulya – Elusive
- Best Jazz Album
  - **Andrea Keller – Mikrokosmos**
    - Andrew Robson – On
    - Kevin Hunt Trio – Love Walked In
    - The Necks – Athenaeum, Homebush, Quay & Raab
    - The World According to James – Wayback
- Best Original Soundtrack Recording
  - **Mick Harvey – Australian Rules**
    - Cezary Skubiszewski – After The Deluge (Original Television Mini-series Soundtrack)
    - Dave Graney & Clare Moore – Music from the Motion Picture - Bad Eggs
    - The Saddle Club – On Top of the World
    - Various Artists – The Secret Life of Us Volume 3
- Best Original Cast/Show Recording
  - **Various Artists - Long Way To The Top - Live In Concert**
- Best Classical Album
  - **Saffire** – Saffire - The Australian Guitar Quartet
    - Marshall McGuire – The 20th Century Harp
    - Slava Grigoryan, Leonard Grigoryan – Play
    - Teddy Tahu Rhodes – Mozart Arias
    - Yvonne Kenny – Make Believe

== ARIA Hall of Fame Inductee ==
Inducted into the ARIA Hall of Fame was:

- John Farnham

== Outstanding Achievement Award ==
- The Wiggles

== Channel V Oz Artist of the Year award ==
- Delta Goodrem
  - Silverchair
  - Powderfinger
  - Something For Kate
  - Grinspoon

== See also ==
- Australian music
