= Amiel Daemion =

Musical artist (born 1979)

- Also known as: Amiel
- Born: Amiel Muki Daemion; 13 August 1979 (age 47); New York City, United States
- Origin: Melbourne, Australia
- Genre: Electronic
- Occupations: Actress, pop singer, songwriter
- Instrument: Vocals
- Years active: 1981–2006
- Labels: Festival, Warner

Amiel Muki Daemion (born 13 August 1979), also known as just Amiel, is an American-born former Australian pop singer, songwriter and actress. She moved to Australia with her family at the age of two and starred in films in the 1990s, including The Silver Brumby, which also starred Russell Crowe and Caroline Goodall. Her music career shot to fame in 1999 when she teamed up with producer Josh Abrahams (as Puretone) for the song "Addicted to Bass" which became a top twenty hit in Australia. This led to Daemion releasing studio albums Audio Out in 2003 and These Ties in 2005.

== Biography ==
=== Early career ===
Born in New York City, United States, Daemion was raised in a musical household, with her parents being musicians. Her father was a musician, composer and vocalist. Daemion states "ever since I was a little girl he [her father] would have musical instruments around. He really encouraged me to do what I'm doing." Her mother was a singer as well, Daemion states "she [her mother] used to play guitar and write songs with her sister. I remember being about four and listening to her Janis Ian records and singing along and learning all the words." Daemion's first three records she bought were John Lennon, De La Soul and Mariah Carey, where she felt that Carey's album was "overproduced". She wrote and recorded her first song at the age of nine in an effort to help spread the message of ecological awareness. Daemion states "I'd seen a documentary. I turned to Dad and said why? and he had no answer for me so I thought if I wrote a song then maybe I could help the cause. I sang it into a tape recorder. Dad heard it and said 'do you realize what you've just done?' I said 'no.' He said: 'Amiel, you've written a song." She was introduced to the world of entertainment at the age of eleven performing the leading role alongside Russell Crowe in the feature film The Silver Brumby. She states "I always knew that all I wanted to do was perform."

=== 1995–2003: Collaborations with Josh Abrahams and debut album ===
Daemion's music career began in 1995 when she was hired to do some backing vocals on a song the Australian producer Josh Abrahams was producing. Instead of just singing the song, she included her harmonies, melodies and lyrics and sang only two takes for Abrahams who then offered her a career in music. They released their first single together called "Addicted to Bass" in 1998. The song had success and peaked in the top twenty on the Australian ARIA Singles Chart and was nominated for two ARIA Awards at the 1999 awards for "Single of the Year" and "Best Video" but lost to "The Day You Come" by Powderfinger and "Girls Like That..." by Custard. With the success of "Addicted to Bass", Daemion was then given a solo recording contract in 1998 at the age of nineteen with Festival Records and decided that Abrahams would be the best producer for her debut album. Daemion was confronted by delays while making the record and refused to be bothered by the record's slow progress, so she used this time to write new songs both in Australia and in the United States where she composed and recorded a song, "Meet Me in the Red Room", for the second Moulin Rouge! soundtrack with Marius De Vries, under the direction of Baz Luhrmann. The new songs Daemion worked with changed the direction of the record and while a couple of the very early songs remained, the songs that were written during this period were replaced by the first demos. Daemion states "As I learnt more about the recording process and worked with different people my writing evolved and my vision for the record expanded." What started out as a small independent record, it turned into a full-scale production and Daemion's record became a major priority for her record company, which had merged to become Festival Mushroom Records since she had been signed.

In 2002, due to the success of "Addicted to Bass" in Australia and New Zealand, Abrahams and Daemion collaborated to form the band Puretone to release the song around the world. The song became a hit around the globe peaking at number two in the United Kingdom with the help of a remixed form by Apollo 440 and number-one on the US Billboard Hot Dance Club Play. Abrahams and Daemion released a second single as Puretone named "Stuck in a Groove" which became a minor hit around the world. They also wrote the music for a Vodafone television commercial that was nominated for "Best Music for an Advertisement" at the 2002 APRA Screen Awards. Daemion released her first single, "Lovesong", in March 2003 and became the most added song to Australian radio upon its release and was one of the most play song on Australian radio for 2003. It became Daemion's first solo top ten single in Australia. Her debut album, Audio Out, was released in Australia on 18 August 2003 and she states it is her weird take on the world. The album debuted in the top twenty on the Australian ARIA Albums Chart and was certified gold by ARIA. Due to the positive reception review and chart wise, Daemion was nominated for five ARIA Awards at the 2003 awards for "Single of the Year" and "Highest Selling Single" for "Lovesong" and "Best Female Artist", "Breakthrough Artist – Album" and "Best Pop Release" for Audio Out.

=== 2004–2006: These Ties and Be Your Girl ===
During the promotion of Audio Out in 2004 in London, Daemion went out on the search for a new producer and came across Stephen Lironi, an ex-member of the UK band Altered Images. Daemion states that she "felt comfortable with him straight away. I felt like he got what I was trying to do creatively." After a few short months of working with Lironi, Daemion felt that her second solo album, These Ties, was born. Just as the album's first single, "Round and Round", was released, it had been announced that the recording assets of the Festival Mushroom group had been acquired by Warner Music. Everything at Warner Music came to a temporary standstill while it was slowly adjusted by its new entity. While staff and artists at Festival Mushroom Records started being dropped all around her, Daemion made the agreement to postpone the release of These Ties until "the dust had settled". These Ties was released in Japan on 19 October 2005 and failed to reach the top twenty success that Audio Out received.

In 2005, she performed the lead vocals on The Blips song "Green Eyed World", which was featured on the soundtrack of the 2005 film Hating Alison Ashley. In addition, she released an electroclash cover of the Split Enz song "One Step Ahead" on the Finn Brothers tribute album She Will Have Her Way which was released also in 2005. A few months later, the dust did settle down for Warner Music. These Ties Australian release date had to be pulled back many times so Daemion and Warner Music both agreed that it was no longer her new album and to try to come back where they had left off halfway through a release would be impossible. Daemion and Warner Music decided to work on an "in between" project, which was to take Daemion's These Ties song, "Be Your Girl", and form it into an EP of remixed songs from the album. Daemion states that she "wanted to find a fun and positive way to use these songs." She decided to collaborate with some of Australia and New Zealand's hip hop and dance producers, and the 'Bass Kleph' version of the song was released to Australian radio to promote the EP.

During November 2008, Daemion announced that she had been released from the Warner Records label. She stated "It may sound strange to all you budding artists out there – that I would try for so long to get out of my contract – when you would give anything just to get one..but there are indeed, always two sides to every coin."

Since the release of the Be Your Girl EP in 2006, Daemion has retreated from the spotlight and not released further music.

== Discography ==
=== Albums ===
Tile	Album details	Chart peak positions		Certifications (sales thresholds)
Tile	Album details	AUS	JPN	Certifications (sales thresholds)
Audio Out	First studio album; Released: 18 August 2003; Label: Festival	17	20	ARIA: Gold
These Ties	Second studio album; Released: 19 October 2005; Label: Sony Japan	—	141	

=== EPs ===
Title	Details
Be Your Girl	Released: 4 November 2006; Label: Warner

=== Singles ===
Year	Title	Chart positions					Album
Year	Title	AUS	GER	NZ	UK	US Dance	Album
1998	"Addicted to Bass" (with Josh Abrahams)	15	—	27	—	—	Sweet Distorted Holiday
1999	"Headroom" (with Josh Abrahams)	146	—	—	—	—	Sweet Distorted Holiday
1999	"The Chase"	96	—	—	—	—	Single only
2002	"Addicted to Bass" (re-release) (as Puretone)	50	58	—	2	1	Stuck in a Groove
2002	"Stuck in a Groove" (as Puretone)	—	—	—	26	4	Stuck in a Groove
2003	"Lovesong"	6	75	—	—	—	Audio Out
2003	"Obsession (I Love You)"	15	—	—	—	—	Audio Out
2003	"Tonight"	64	—	—	—	—	Audio Out
2005	"Round and Round"	64	—	—	—	—	These Ties
2006	"Be Your Girl"	76	—	—	—	—	Be Your Girl EP

== Filmography ==
Year	Title	Role	Notes
1993	The Silver Brumby	Indi Mitchell	Feature film
1997	Raw FM	Emma	TV series, 1 episode
1998	Meteorites!	Crystal Cassidy	

== Awards and nominations ==
=== APRA Awards ===
The APRA Awards are presented annually from 1982 by the Australasian Performing Right Association (APRA).

Year	Nominee / work	Award	Result
2004	"Lovesong" – Amiel – Amiel Daemion	Most Performed Australian Work	Won
2004	"Tonight" – Amiel – Amiel Daemion, Barry Palmer, Stuart Crichton	Most Performed Dance Work	Nominated

=== ARIA Awards ===
Year	Award	Work	Result
1999	Best Video (Craig Melville and David Curry)	"Addicted to Bass"	Nominated
1999	Single of the Year	"Addicted to Bass"	Nominated
2003	Best Pop Release	Audio Out	Nominated
2003	Breakthrough Artist – Album	Audio Out	Nominated
2003	Best Female Artist	Audio Out	Nominated
2003	Highest Selling Single	"Lovesong"	Nominated
2003	Single of the Year	"Lovesong"	Nominated
