= Blair Venn =

Australian actor

- Born: Quindanning, Western Australia
- Occupation: Actor
- Works: Neighbours; Head Start

Blair Venn is an Australian actor who has played roles in theatre, film and television.

== Early life ==
Venn was born in Quindanning, Western Australia.

== Career ==
Venn played the regular role of Garrett Quinn in the short-lived ABC television drama series Head Start in 2001. He has also appeared in two recurring roles on the Australian soap opera Neighbours. In 2000, he played duplicitous lawyer Brendan Bell, who was the abusive husband of Tess Bell (played by Krista Vendy). and Richard Aaronow. Brendan Bell met an untimely end when he died of a heart attack after sustaining an injury in a road accident. The character of Richard Aaronow, whom he played in 2007, was the one-time partner of Rebecca Napier (Jane Hall) and father to Oliver Barnes and Declan Napier. The character—another villain—died of renal failure.

Venn's other television credits include Satisfaction (in which he played the recurring guest role of Hank), and guest roles in All Saints, White Collar Blue, Stingers, Farscape, Rush and The Newsreader. His most recent television role was as Henry in the 2024 8-part Paramount+ drama thriller Fake for 2 episodes.

On 8 November 2001, Debi Enker from The Age reported that Venn had been cast in a telemovie titled Life. That same year he appeared in 2001 Australian comedy film The Man Who Sued God opposite Billy Connolly, Judy Davis and Colin Friels. He later appeared alongside Nicolas Cage, Rose Byrne and Ben Mendelsohn in 2009 Hollywood science fiction thriller film Knowing, which was filmed in Melbourne.

In 2003, Venn carried out theatrical work in the plays The Fat Boy and Uncle Vanya. In 2006, he worked on stage productions of Some Explicit Polaroids and Dinner with Friends.

== Filmography ==
=== Film ===
| Year | Role | Title | Notes |
|---|---|---|---|
| 2001 | The Man Who Sued God | Les | Feature film |
| 2008 | Playing for Charlie | Jim | Feature film |
| 2009 | Knowing | Paramedic | Feature film |

=== Television ===
| Year | Role | Title | Notes |
|---|---|---|---|
| 1996 | Natural Justice: Heat | Detective Quinlan | TV movie |
| 1999 | Stingers | Lenny 'G-Long' Baxter | 2 episodes |
| 2000 | Pozieres | Jim O'Brien | TV movie |
| 2000; 2007–2008 | Neighbours | Brendan Bell / Richard Aaronow | 34 episodes |
| 2001 | Head Start | Garett Quinn | 40 episodes |
| 2002 | White Collar Blue | Michael Cleal | 2 episodes |
| 2003 | Farscape | Macton | 1 episode |
| 2005 | Life | Sam Warburg | TV movie |
| 2006 | All Saints | Lewis Palmer | 1 episode |
| 2007–2008 | Satisfaction | Hank the Marathon Man | 3 episodes |
| 2009 | Rush | Paul Duffy | 1 episode |
| 2021 | The Newsreader | John Parry | 1 episode |
| 2024 | Fake | Henry | 2 episodes |

== Theatre ==
| Year | Role | Title | Notes |
|---|---|---|---|
| 2003 | The Fat Boy | Darren | Malthouse Theatre, Melbourne, with Playbox Theatre Company |
| 2003 | Uncle Vanya | | Darlinghurst Theatre, Sydney, with Peter Darren Productions & You Are Here |
| 2004 | Sprung! | | Earl Arts Centre, Launceston with Monkey Baa Productions |
| 2006 | Some Explicit Polaroids | Nick | Darlinghurst Theatre, Sydney, with Smug Theatre |
| 2006 | Dinner with Friends | | Darlinghurst Theatre, Sydney, with Fishy Productions |
