= Jessica (novel) =

Novel by Bryce Courtenay

- First edition
- Author: Bryce Courtenay
- Language: English
- Publisher: Viking Australia
- Publication date: 1 December 1998
- Publication place: Australia
- Media type: Print (hardcover)
- Pages: 395
- ISBN: 0-670-88351-4

Jessica is a historical novel based on a true story by Bryce Courtenay. It was published in 1998 and like other works from Courtenay covers several years in the life of the main character: Jessica Bergman. It was adapted into a mini-series starring Leeanna Walsman and Sam Neill which aired on Australian television in 2004. Jessica was voted Best Mini Series at the 2004 Chicago International Film Festival. It twice won the APA Who Weekly Reader's Choice Award, in 1999 and 2000.

== Plot ==
Jessica is a tomboy, raised to be her father's son to help out on the farm. Her older sister Meg is very much her mother's daughter, and it is Meg's and their mother's mission for Meg to seduce Jack Thomas, the town's wealthiest eligible bachelor. Jessica and her dad work each year shearing at Riverview station for the Thomases – the richest family in the district. In the shearing shed, Jessica becomes close friends with Jack Thomas and William D'arcy Simon. Jessica is teased by the other boys, predominantly for simply being female. Eventually she is attacked, with tar poured over her head and hair. Jack and William defend her, but William is kicked by a horse, causing brain damage and earning him the name Billy Simple. Subsequently, Jessica and Jack's relationship blossoms and they become Billy's sole friends.

Jack gets Billy a job working as a gardener for his rich family, but one day Billy kills Jack's mother and two sisters, because of their constant taunting of him. Jessica takes him on the long journey to the nearest town with a courthouse, endangering herself. Jessica holds off the angry mob of farmers, to give Billy a fair trial. When they finally reach the courthouse, the farmers (including Jack) catch them. However, although Billy has murdered his mother and sisters, Jack holds off the mob and sweeps exhausted Jessica off her feet and carries her into the courthouse. Billy is later sentenced to death, but not without a fight from his lawyer, Richard Runche.

After this Jack starts coming to their house and "walking out" with Jessica. Meg does not want anything to do with him because he is no longer going to be rich as his father disinherited him. Jack enlists and finds out that he has to leave to war he also mentions that his mothers will was read and he is now sole inheritor of the whole estate. He asks Jessica to be his wife but she says yes but to keep it a secret until he gets back. That same day Hester then informs Jessica that she cannot talk to him anymore and that Meg and Jack were just being nice and they are an item. Jack is leaving in week and her mom cooks up a scheme when Joe takes Jessica to the doctor to get checked because she has been really sick that Hester leaves and Meg seduces Jack as a going away "present". At the doctors visit Jessica finds out she is pregnant, her parents suspect that she had intimate relations with Billy Simple on the way to town, but she will not say who the father is. Meg then pretends to be pregnant, forcing Jack to marry her before he leaves, although he loves Jessica. He does make Meg sign a paper saying she and Hester will receive none of his estate unless she actually gives birth or has a miscarriage. Her mother tells the town that Jessica has gone crazy, so had to be isolated (during her pregnancy). Hester and Meg have a plan to have a miscarriage with witnesses but the witness sees Jessica's pregnancy while she is there so Jessica's father and mother suffocate her and Hester comes up with a plan to take Jessica's baby after it is born. Jessica's baby is born Christmas Day and Joe has a change of heart and decides not to take her baby. Jessica's father tries to kill Jessica's mother, his wife because he is done with everything but he has a heart attack. They convince Jessica to come back for the funeral with the baby and to go to the funeral without Joey because no one knows she had a baby. Then at the funeral, when they announce that Meg gave birth, Jessica breaks down, screaming that they stole her baby and attacks Hester.

She is put in a mental asylum for 4 years, and makes friends with a Jewish man, Moishe Goldberg. She helps him to get better and when he is released, Moishe contacts Billy's lawyer, Richard Runche who fights and frees Jessica. Meg and her mother agree to give her the land entitlement for their old property plus another 10 acres (40,000 m2) on the condition that she never approaches her son, Joey, or tries to get him back. Her Aboriginal friend, Mary's (who helped her during her pregnancy) half-caste children are taken by the authorities, and Jessica, with the help of Runche and Moishe, gets them back in a court case to make history.

Upon return to her house one afternoon, Jessica finds her dog has been bitten by a snake. She goes off to find the snakes and while Jessica is successful in killing one, its mate bites Jessica before being bludgeoned to death with her rifle. Knowing that death is near, she goes back to her hut and is found dead by Mary. Mary also finds a letter Jessica wrote to Jack, but never sent advising him of being pregnant with his child.

=== Publication history ===
- 1998, Australia, Viking Australia ISBN 0-670-88351-4, Pub date 1 December 1998, hardcover
- 1999, Canada, ISBN 1-55278-088-0, Pub date 1 January 1999, hardcover
- 2000, United Kingdom, Penguin Books ISBN 978-0-14-027960-3, Pub date 27 July 2000, paperback

== Literary significance and reception ==
The book was very well received, rated at Amazon as 4.2 out of 5.0 and at 3.92 out of 5.0 at GoodReads. The book won the APA Who Weekly Reader's Choice Award in both 1999 and 2000.

== Adaptations ==
Jessica (2004/TV) – 196 Minutes
