= Chapter One (FSOM album) =

Studio album by Future Sound of Melbourne
- Released: October 1995
- Studio: Fishtank Recording Studio
- Label: Volition Records

Future Sound of Melbourne chronology
The Avatar EP (1994)	Chapter One (1995)	Prologue (1999)

Singles from Chapter One
- 1. "Flashflood" Released: 1995

Chapter One is the debut studio album released by Australian electronic group Future Sound of Melbourne (styled as FSOM). At the ARIA Music Awards of 1996, the album won the ARIA Award for Best Dance Release

== Track listing ==
1. "The Groove" - 2:04
2. "Flashflood" - 5:32
3. "Equinox" - 5:24
4. "Chapter One" - 5:39
5. "System X - 4:47
6. "Lunar Eclipse" - 6:50
7. "Antichrist" - 2:52
