= When We Were Kids =

EP by The Galvatrons
- Released: 3 May 2008
- Genre: Electronic rock
- Label: Warner Music Australia
- Producer: Lindsay Gravina

The Galvatrons chronology
When We Were Kids (2008)	Laser Graffiti (2009)

Singles from When We Were Kids (EP)
- 1. "When We Were Kids" Released: 3 May 2008

When We Were Kids is the debut EP by Australian electronic rock band The Galvatrons. It was released by Warner Music Australia on 3 May 2008 and produced by Lindsay Gravina. The title track was the number one most added track on radio in Australia for the week 19–26 April 2008. The EP peaked at No. 39 on the ARIA Singles Chart.

== Track listing ==
1. "When We Were Kids" (Jonathan Mole)
2. "She's in Love" (Mole)
3. "Donnie's on TV" (Mole)
4. "When We Were Kids (Bag Raiders Remix)"
5. "Donnie's on TV (Bobby Broke & Dudley Moore Remix)"

== Charts ==
Chart (2008)	Peak position
Australian ARIA Singles Chart	39
