= Jessica (miniseries) =

Australian television miniseries

- DVD cover
- Genre: drama, miniseries
- Based on: Jessica by Bryce Courtenay
- Screenplay by: Peter Yeldham
- Directed by: Peter Andrikidis
- Starring: Sam Neill; Leeanna Walsman; Lisa Harrow; Tony Martin; John Howard
- Theme music composer: Paul Grabowsky
- Country of origin: Australia
- Original language: English

Production
- Producer: Anthony Buckley
- Running time: 196 minutes
- Budget: ~A$7,200,000

Original release
- Network: Network Ten
- Release: 18 July 2004

Jessica is an Australian television miniseries based on the historical novel by Bryce Courtenay. Originally broadcast by Australia's Network Ten in 2004 and set in the Australian outback at the turn of the twentieth century, this family based drama follows a young woman who is unjustly institutionalised. Jessica won a 2005 Logie award for best mini-series or telemovie, plus two awards at the 2004 Chicago International Film Festival - one of them for the direction of Australian Peter Andrikidis.

== Plot ==
The Bergman sisters could not be more different. Jessica (Leeanna Walsman) is a feisty tomboy who loves to help her father work their farmland. Her beautiful sister Meg (Megan Dorman) is eagerly being groomed by her mother Hester (Lisa Harrow) to be the perfect wife, so that she can marry her way out of poverty. However, when the man, Jack Thomas (Oliver Ackland), who Meg has set her sights on falls in love with Jessica and gets her pregnant, Hester schemes to wrench the couple apart to claim Jessica's son, Joey for Meg. Later she commits Jessica to a mental asylum. It is here that Jessica receives news of her lover's death and almost loses hope, but after enlisting the help of Mr. Runche (Sam Neill), a down and out lawyer battling alcoholism, she is eventually released.

Years later, it is the reformed Runche who gives Jessica the courage to fight for the return of her child. Eventually Meg and Hester call an uneasy truce with Jessica, and allow her to play a role in Joey's life as his aunt. Jessica later dies from a snake bite and the film ends with Joey (aged 16) visiting Jessica's grave.

== Cast ==
Major characters

- Leeanna Walsman as Jessica Bergman
- Lisa Harrow as Hester Bergman
- Sam Neill as Richard Runche
- Tony Martin as Joe Bergman
- Megan Dorman as Meg Bergman
- John Howard as George Thomas
- Oliver Ackland as Jack Thomas
- Wil Traval as Billy Simple (ep. 1)
- Natasha Wanganeen as Mary Simpson
- Kerry Walker as Mrs Baker
- Heather Mitchell as Ada Thomas (ep. 1)
- Huw Higginson as Prosecutor (ep. 1)
- Peter Sumner as Rennie (ep. 2, guest ep. 1)
- Ivan Clarke as Banjo (ep. 2)

Secondary cast

- Nikki Osborne as Gwen Thomas
- Peter Sommerfeld as Reverend Matthews
- Caroline Stainsby as Winifred Thomas
- Simon Chilvers as Judge
- Justin Byrne as Clerk of the Court
- Harrison Turk as Baby Joey
- Kyah Patten as Sarah Simpson, 7 years old
- Cecileigh Patten as Polly Simpson, 5 years old
- Jess Flanagan as Luke
- Raphael Dickson as Dave
- Nicholas Papademetriou as Coffin Nail
- Felix Dean as Joey Thomas, 4 years old
- Edward Mitchell as Cook's Nephew
- David Baldwin as Magistrate
- Julie Lowe as Cook
- David Kerslake as Merrick
- Richard Healey as Colonel
- John Gregg as Justice Wall
- Antony Milne as Codlington
- Deborah Piper as Churchgoer
- Barry Pearce as Priest
- Richard Connell as Ladd
- Edmund Pegge as Sneddon
- Barry Quin as McDonald
- Eliza Logan as Matron at Girl's Home
- Scott Johnson as Phillips
- Oliver Torr as Tom
- Grant Richardson as Recruiting Sergeant
- Kerry Wildermoth as Shop Owner
- Robert Owens as Soldier
- Mark Sipple as Cop
- David Ritchie as Dr. Warwick
- Brent Williams as Male Nurse
- Sarah White as Matron
- Andrew Vallentine as Hotel Clerk
- George Andrikidis as Blacksmith
- Ross Wilson as Guard at Wagga
- Lee Martin as Yanco Cop
- Mim Dinsmore as Ma Shannon
- Mark Furze as Joey Thomas, age 16
- Vince Melton as Vince Melton
- John Lennon as Foreman of the Jury

== Awards and nominations ==
Year	Award	Category	Recipient	Result
2004	Australian Film Institute	Young Actor's Award	Natasha Wanganeen for Jessica	Won
2004	Australian Film Institute	Best Actor in a Leading Role in a Television Drama or Comedy	Sam Neill for Jessica	Nominated
2004	Australian Film Institute	Open Craft Award for Television (Musical Composition)	Paul Grabowsky for Jessica	Nominated
2004	Chicago International Film Festival	Silver Plaque - Best Miniseries	Peter Andrikidis for Jessica	Won
2004	Chicago International Film Festival	Silver Hugo - Special Achievement in Direction	Peter Andrikidis for Jessica	Won
2005	TV Week Logie Awards	Silver Logie - Most Outstanding Actor in a Drama Series	Sam Neill for Jessica	Won
2005	TV Week Logie Awards	Silver Logie - Most Outstanding Actor in a Drama Series	Tony Martin for Jessica	Nominated
2005	TV Week Logie Awards	Silver Logie - Most Outstanding Actress in a Drama Series	Leeanna Walsman	Nominated
2005	TV Week Logie Awards	Most Outstanding Miniseries/Telemovie	Jessica	Won
