= School of Synthesis =

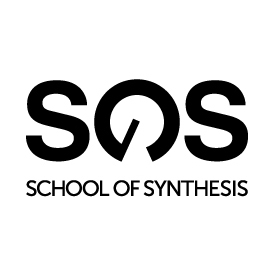

School of Synthesis is a musical school in Melbourne, Australia specializing in electronic music. School of Synthesis was formed in 2010 by ARIA Award-winning Australian music producer, composer, sound designer Davide Carbone and DJ and music producer Mike Callander. Carbone and Callander met at RMIT University in Melbourne where Callander was a student and Carbone a teacher in sound recording.

The school offers courses in Ableton Live, Logic Pro, Sound Design (featuring Native Instruments software Massive and Kontakt), Electronic Music Theory, Maschine and Mixing and Mastering. It also runs free monthly events on electronic music production in Melbourne. In December 2012 School of Synthesis presented an event by Dutch techno producer/DJ Joris Voorn. The attendees at this Masterclass were selected via a competition co-presented by the electronic dance music festival Stereosonic.

== See also ==
- Music of Australia
