= These Ties =

Studio album by Amiel
- Released: 19 October 2005
- Recorded: 2004–2005 in London at Mahoos Studios and The Strongroom
- Genre: Pop
- Length: 42:36
- Label: Sony Japan
- Producer: Stephen Lironi

Amiel chronology
Audio Out (2003)	These Ties (2005)	Be Your Girl (2006)

Alternative cover
- Australian promotional cover.

Singles from These Ties
- 1. "Round and Round" Released: September 2005

These Ties is the second album by the Australian singer Amiel, released in Japan by Sony Japan on 19 October 2005 (see 2005 in music). The album is a mix between a pop and dance songs – written by Stephen Lironi and Amiel herself . It was due to be released in Australia in 2005 but was shelved due to the label break-up of Warner Music Australia and Festival Records. Only one single was released from the album, "Round and Round", which was not a major hit failing to enter the top fifty on the Australian ARIA Singles Chart.

The album was released in Japan due to high sales of her debut album. These Ties made its debut on the Japan Albums Chart at one hundred and forty-one with 1,320 copies sold. The next week also showed not much success falling down to number two hundred and eighty.

== Background and production ==
After the extreme promoting Amiel did for her previous album, Audio Out, she returned to Australia and retreated into the subtropical rainforests of Australia's mid north-eastern coast. In these rainforests, Amiel had three weeks of solitude composing, she states "I found a small, secluded hut nestled deep in the valley by a stream. My bed was a loft surrounded by trees. Deep into the night I wrote and wrote." Amiel would also drive down the back roads of the rainforests listening to her favorite hip hop records when she felt restless.

Amiel then went to look for a new producer for the album, she ended up in London and was introduced to ex Altered Images band member Stephen Lironi. Lironi had previously worked other bands such as Space, Black Grape and Hanson, but Amiel states that none of that really mattered to her when she met him. She states "All that mattered was that I felt comfortable with him straight away- I felt like he got what I was trying to do creatively." Working with Lironi saw Amiel exploring a more organic sound, while still sticking to her electronic roots. She explains "I’ve never seen myself as tied to a particular genre and been happy that my taste tends to lead me right across the musical spectrum."

== Track listing ==
All songs written by Amiel Daemion and Stephen Lironi unless noted.

1. "Expectations" – 3:49
2. "Be Your Girl" (Daemion) – 3:57
3. "Moving On" – 4:40
4. "Round and Round" – 3:33
5. "On the Outside" – 3:37
6. "Under Your Spell" (Daemion) – 4:05
7. "These Ties" (Daemion) – 3:59
8. "Trouble" – 3:55
9. "Storm Blew Over" – 3:26
10. "Stars" – 3:55
11. "Following the Sun" – 3:40
12. "Easier to Lie" – 4:10

== Charts ==
Chart (2005)	Peak position
Japan Albums Chart	141

== Release history ==
Region	Date	Label	Format	Catalogue
Japan	19 October 2005	Sony Japan	CD	SICP-919
