= The Matrix (album) =

2009 studio album by The Matrix

Studio album by the Matrix
- Released: January 27, 2009
- Recorded: 2004
- Studios: Decoy Studios & Ameraycan Studios (California)
- Genres: Pop rock; dance-pop; europop
- Length: 36:00
- Label: Let's Hear It
- Producer: The Matrix

The Matrix is the self-titled debut album by the production group, the Matrix. It was released on the iTunes Store on January 27, 2009, through iTunes, as well as on audio CD. The album featured music written and produced by the group with vocals by Katy Perry and British singer Adam Longlands.

== Background ==
In 2002, the Matrix produced five songs for Avril Lavigne's debut studio album Let Go, including the three top-ten singles "Complicated", "Sk8er Boi", and "I'm with You". The commercial success of Lavigne's album led to a surge in popularity for the Matrix, resulting in them becoming a sought after production team. The Matrix subsequently produced songs for other popular acts, such as Britney Spears, Ricky Martin, Robbie Williams, and Mariah Carey. Knowing that the members of the production team were performers prior to becoming producers, Columbia Records executive Tim Devine suggested to the Matrix that they record and release an album of their own. Wanting an outlet to release their own music, the Matrix agreed with Devine's idea and signed a deal with Columbia Records to record and release one studio album.

While the Matrix desired to release their own music, the production team also wanted to avoid any media attention. Devine also recommended that the production team hire a new singer to bring a "fresh face" and new dynamic to the team. As a result, the production team opted to hire two singers to share lead vocals on their album. The production team was already working with Adam Longlands, then known by the stage name A.K.A., on several songs when they asked him to join the project. Katy Perry was invited to join the project after Devine referred her to the Matrix following a meeting between him and Glen Ballard. Ballard introduced Perry to Devine, and Devine was impressed with her vocal performance and charisma. In regards to hiring Longlands and Perry for the project, Lauren Christy commented: "The reason we picked Katy and A.K.A. is they're amazing performers. [Graham Edwards, Scott Spock, and I] like our role in the background and it shall continue to be there".

== Album information ==
The album was recorded in 2004, when Katy Perry was 19 years old. In the October 2004 issue of Blender, they named Perry "The Next Big Thing!" The Matrix worked with the vocalist who contributed to the writing of the music and the lyrics for the songs. Despite the buzz about the album, the Matrix decided to cancel the album weeks before the album's due date. "Broken" was set to be its first single. In 2009, after the success of Perry's second solo album One of the Boys (2008), the Matrix's label decided to release the album under the record label, Let's Hear It Records. According to Perry, the Matrix wanted to create "Complicated, the sequel" and "Since U Been Gone, the sequel".

With lyrical differences, "Broken" had previously been recorded in 2003, under the title "What Do You Do?", by Matrix-produced sister act, the Troys. It was released in 2003 on Elektra as a promo single for an album that was eventually shelved, but was also included in the compilation album, The Powerpuff Girls: Power Pop. Sara Paxton recorded "Take a Walk" in 2005 for the Darcy's Wild Life soundtrack. In 2006, "Live Before I Die", appeared on a bonus track version of Ashley Parker Angel's debut album Soundtrack to Your Life. Ashley re-wrote the majority of the song. In 2007, a song from Skye Sweetnam's Sound Soldier album, titled "Boyhunter", which was produced by the Matrix surfaced. The song uses a slightly altered version of the music from the track "Damn". Ashley Tisdale re-recorded "Love Is a Train" for her second album, Guilty Pleasure, which was released as "Time's Up", a bonus track on the album.

== Release ==
"Broken" was reportedly planned to be released as the lead single from The Matrix in the spring of 2004, with the album following in the early summer. The production team completed the album, recorded several music videos, shot several photoshoots, and had a heavy promotional campaign planned for the album's rollout. These plans, however, were abruptly cancelled several weeks before the planned release. Several tentative release dates went by without news on The Matrix, before the album was quietly shelved. The Matrix later claimed that the album's cancellation was due to their dissatisfaction with the time commitments of the album's planned promotional campaign, finding that it offered them little time to continue producing music for other artists. Glen Ballard, however, claimed that the project fell apart internally and the production team could not even unanimously decide upon a lead single. In April 2006, Christy stated that the production team was still considering a possible release for the album.

In 2008, the Matrix made tentative plans to release the album through their own record label, Let's Hear It Records. These plans were soon halted, however, after Perry's debut single, "I Kissed a Girl", achieved international commercial success after its release in April 2008. Christy contacted Perry about moving forward with the release of The Matrix, prompting Perry to ask the production team to wait to release the album until after the release of the fourth and final single ("Waking Up in Vegas") from One of the Boys (2008). Despite this suggestion, The Matrix was released on iTunes on January 27, 2009, by Let's Hear It Records. The album received no promotion and failed to attain any notable commercial success. Prior to the album's release, Christy reiterated that the Matrix was not striving for commercial success, but rather just releasing the songs as a creative outlet. She stated: "We don't want to be pop stars, and we're not releasing it on a major label. And it's not called 'Katy Perry and the Matrix.' These are just great songs, and I'm very proud of it".

== Critical reception ==
Professional ratings
Review scores
Source	Rating
AllMusic	2.5/5 stars

AllMusic's Stephen Thomas Erlewine described the album as "bland and stiff Euro-pop", maintaining that the effort illustrates that the Matrix "need a real star, somebody to provide focus and direction".

== Track listing ==
The Matrix – Standard edition
No.	Title	Writer(s)	Vocal(s)	Length
1.	"You Miss Me"	Lauren Christy; Scott Spock; Graham Edwards; Katy Perry; Adam Longlands	Perry; Longlands	3:44
2.	"Broken"	Christy; Spock; Edwards; Anna Troy; Lindsey Troy	Perry; Longlands	3:14
3.	"Damn"	Christy; Spock; Edwards; Perry; Longlands	Perry	3:27
4.	"Take a Walk"	Christy; Spock; Edwards; Longlands	Longlands; Perry	3:12
5.	"Just a Song"	Christy; Spock; Edwards; Perry	Perry	4:04
6.	"I Love You"	Christy; Spock; Edwards; Amiel Daemion	Longlands	3:29
7.	"Live Before I Die"	Christy; Spock; Edwards; Longlands	Longlands	3:51
8.	"Would You Care"	Christy; Spock; Edwards	Perry	3:22
9.	"Seen That Done That"	Christy; Spock; Edwards; Longlands	Longlands	3:44
10.	"Stay with Me"	Christy; Spock; Edwards; Paul Oakenfold; Rolo Green	Longlands; Perry	3:48
Total length:				36:00

== Personnel ==
Credits are adapted from the liner notes of The Matrix.

The Matrix

- Lauren Christy – writer, producer, arrangement, recording, mixing
- Scott Spock – writer, arrangement, recording, mixing
- Graham Edwards – writer, arrangement, recording, mixing

Other musicians

- Katy Perry – writer, producer, lead vocals, background vocals
- Adam Longlands – writer, producer, lead vocals, background vocals
- Corky James – guitar
- Randy Jacobs – guitar
- Dean Parks – guitar
- Victor Indrizzo – drums
- Jim Manley – trumpet on "Damn"
- Cameron Stone – cello on "Just a Song"
- David Campbell – string arrangements on "Live Before I Die"
- Steve Churchyard – strings recording on "Live Before I Die"

Technical

- Serban Ghenea – mixing on "You Miss Me", "Damn", "Take a Walk", and "I Love You"
- Bob Clearmountain – mixing on "Just a Song" and "Live Before I Die"
- Kevin Harp – mixing assistant on "Just a Song" and "Live Before I Die"
- Tom Lord-Alge – mixing on "Broken"
- Femio Hernandez – mixing assistant on "Broken"
- Chris Holmes – assistant engineer
- Stuart Brawley – additional engineering
- Krish Sharma – additional engineering
- Wizards of Oz (Andrew & Liz) – additional engineering
- Greg Trampe – additional engineering
- Chris Gehringer – mastering at Sterling Sound (New York City)
