= Head Start (TV series) =

- Genre: Drama
- Created by: Chris Roache
- Starring: Blair Venn; Freya Stafford; David Hoflin
- Country of origin: Australia
- Original language: English
- No. of seasons: 1
- No. of episodes: 40

Production
- Executive producer: Ben Gannon
- Producers: Chris Roache; Michael Bourchier

Original release
- Network: ABC
- Release: 4 March – 2 December 2001

Head Start is an Australian television teen drama series broadcast on ABC. It ran for 40 episode from 4 March 2001 until 2 December 2001.

== Premise ==
A large banking corporation runs an ongoing competition to foster innovation, creativity and achievement for young Australians. Applicants aged 18 to 21 submit arts, sports, science, business and community projects. Each winner receives a $20,000 grant to make the dream project a reality.

The applicants live in a city warehouse with other skilled competitors.The successful seven are advised and directed by Garrett Quinn (Blair Venn), a 40-year-old former corporate high flyer who lost everything in the crash of '87. He now sees this job as a way of redeeming himself.

Among this year's successful applicants are Loc Minh Vu (Gareth Yuen), a Vietnamese internet programmer determined to set up a website to help refugees, and Clare (Nadia Townsend) and Patrick Gormley (David Hoflin), a brother and sister combination from the country who are attempting to establish and market their line of yabbies for the fresh food market. Basia Lem (Freya Stafford) is a documentary maker striving to complete a film on the life of one of the country's pioneer female aviators. Seth Wallace (Garth Holcombe) and Kyle Richter (Ryan Johnson), designer and promoter of a new automatic gear change prototype for bicycles, and Katherine Ingram (Megan Dorman), a classical piano prodigy who is putting together a recording of her compositions.

== Production ==
Filming for the series began in late 2000 in a warehouse studio in Sydney. It was broadcast on ABC on 4 March 2001, and repeated on pay-TV channel Fox8 a few weeks later.

== Cast ==
=== Main ===
- David Hoflin as Patrick Gormley
- Nadia Townsend as Clare Gormley (episodes 1–18)
- Megan Dorman as Katherine Ingram
- Garth Holcombe as Seth Wallace
- Gareth Yuen as Loc Minh Vu (episodes 1–22)
- Freya Stafford as Basia Lem
- Ryan Johnson as Kyle Richter
- Blair Venn as Garrett Quinn
- Mereoni Vuki as Jade Matu (episodes 23–40)
- Charlie Clausen as Aaron Symonds (episodes 31–40)

=== Recurring ===
- Melissa Jaffer as Amanda Villiers (9 episodes)
- Lara Cox as Posy
- Marshall Napier as John Allott (4 episodes)
- Matthew Le Nevez as Terry Vaughan (3 episodes)
- Rel Hunt as Jordan Gray (6 episodes)

=== Guests ===
- Ally Fowler as Felice (2 episodes)
- Amy Mathews as Louise (1 episode)
- Gerry Sont as Journalist (2 episodes)
- Inge Hornstra as Rhonda (1 episode)
- Jessica Napier as Amy (1 episode)
- Jodie Dry as Carla Mann (2 episodes)
- Michael Denkha as Tom (1 episode)
- Peta Sergeant as Nicole (1 episode)

== See also ==
- List of Australian television series
