= Josh Abrahams =

Australian musician

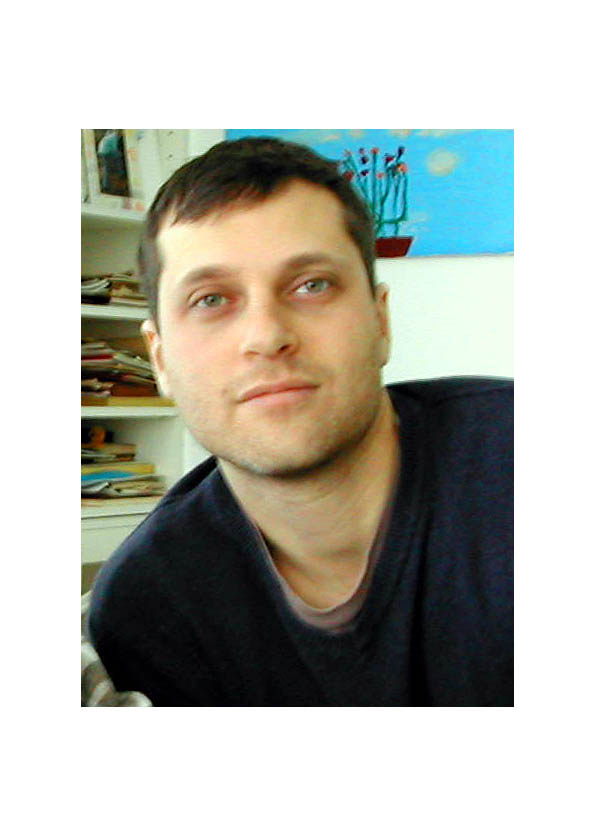
- Abrahams c. 2000

Background information
- Also known as: Puretone, The Pagan, Bassliners
- Born: 1968 (age 57–58); Melbourne, Victoria, Australia
- Years active: 1990–present
- Labels: Shock, Worldwide Ultimatum, Festival, EMI
- Member of: Future Sound of Melbourne, s:amplify

Josh Abrahams (born 1968) is an Australian musician who emerged from the underground dance music scene in the early 1990s. He has performed and recorded under the stage name Puretone and is also known as The Pagan and Bassliners.

Abrahams is a composer, producer, bass guitarist and electronic artist and has worked as a writer, music director and producer on albums and film soundtracks, and in television and theatre. His single, "Addicted to Bass", with singer Amiel Daemion, peaked at No. 15 in February 1999.

== Early life ==
Abrahams was born in 1968 in Melbourne and started as a bass guitarist and singer in covers band Havana Moon in 1990.

=== 1990–1995: Future Sound of Melbourne ===
In 1990, Abrahams formed the techno group, Future Sound of Melbourne (FSOM) with drum and bass producer Davide Carbone and acid house DJ Steve Robbins. They released a number of singles and EPs on the Shock Records imprint, Candyline Records in Australian and released tracks on Belgium's underground dance-music label, Two Thumbs Records. At the ARIA Music Awards of 1996, Future Sound of Melbourne won the ARIA Award for Best Dance Release for their album, Chapter One. During this period, Abrahams also released several dance singles under various artist names including The Pagan and Bassliners. In 1995, Abrahams left Future Sound of Melbourne to become a solo artist,

=== 1996–2001: solo career, "Addicted to Bass" and Sweet Distorted Holiday ===
In 1996, Abrahams was signed to Carl Cox's label Ultimatum and released his debut album The Satyricon to critical acclaim. The album did not chart into the ARIA Top 50, although a track from the album, titled "The Joker", appeared on the soundtrack for the film Hackers.

After briefly creating a pop band called the Edison Project and releasing the single "Don't Be Afraid", Abrahams returned to solo work and signed to Festival Records in Australia in 1997. Film director Baz Luhrmann became interested in Abrahams' work, and asked him to co-produce some tracks for Luhrmann's album Something for Everybody, one of which became the 1998 UK No. 1 single, "Everybody's Free (To Wear Sunscreen)".

In 1998, Abrahams released his second studio album, Sweet Distorted Holiday which included the song "Addicted to Bass", with Amiel Daemion which was released in October 1998 and peaked at No. 15 on the ARIA singles chart. The third single, "Headroom", another collaboration with Daemion, peaked outside the ARIA Top 100. Abrahams also had top 50 chart success in New Zealand. At the ARIA Music Awards of 1999, Abrahams set the record for the number of ARIA nominations for an independent artist with six nominations, winning two.

In 2000, Abrahams released "Rollin'", which peaked at number 58 in Australia.

=== 2001–2008: Puretone, film, television and theatre ===
In 2001, Abrahams produced songs for Daemion, including the platinum-selling single "Lovesong" and the gold-selling album Audio Out. In 2001, Abrahams collaborated with Baz Luhrmann and co-produced the Moulin Rouge film soundtrack.

In 2002, Abrahams composed and produced original music for a feature film by Paul Currie titled One Perfect Day, set in the Melbourne dance music scene.

In 2002, Abrahams changed his stage name and began releasing music under Puretone, to avoid confusion with the similarly named US record producer, Josh Abraham. As Puretone, Abrahams released "Addicted to Bass" internationally, which peaked at No. 2 on the UK Singles Chart. He also released "Stuck in a Groove", once again featuring Daemion on vocals, which peaked at No. 26 in the UK. Both tracks were taken from Puretone's studio album, Stuck in a Groove.

In 2003, Abrahams wrote and produced the original music score for the film One Last Ride, produced by director Ang Lee. He began composing music for television commercials, such as the 'Go for It Girl' campaign for Portmans clothing, a song entitled "Melt with You" for Baileys Irish Cream and the LG technology campaign. In 2005, TV jingles were Abrahams' main focus, along with writing more of his own original music. In 2007, he composed, arranged and recorded large-scale orchestral jingles for a series of three TV commercials for Ask Dot Com. In 2009, he arranged and recorded a version of "My Favourite Things" for a series of Dove TV commercials, and in 2010 he composed and recorded the theme song for the global Tourism Australia advertising campaign.

Abrahams was the music director and pianist for the Soubrettes' Cabaret Tingel Tangel at the Edinburgh Fringe Festival in 2004. He spent July and August 2006 running the nightclub in the first Spiegeltent (a travelling European music and theatre venue) to tour in the US, then returned to this venue as music director for the theatrobatic show Desir, premiering in the New York Spiegeltent in August 2008.

In 2008, Abrahams teamed up with Kaz James, co-writing and producing seven songs for James' debut solo album If They Knew.

=== 2009–present: S:amplify ===
In 2009, Abrahams reunited with his friend Davide Carbone and together they formed the music production house s:amplify. Under this new moniker, Abrahams and Carbone teamed with Carl Cox to co-write and co-produce Cox's album All Roads Lead to the Dancefloor, released in 2012. This trio also provided remixes for Moby, Miguel Bosé and Gilles Peterson, among others. As part of s:amplify, Abrahams and Carbone provided complete sonic branding packages for Melbourne TV network Channel 31, and the Melbourne public transport company Metro Trains Melbourne, as well as composing music for Tourism Australia, Alienware, and the International Cricket Council. S:amplify have also produced several tracks for various artists including the recent cover version of "Wuthering Heights" by Robyn Loau.

In 2011, s:amplify were featured on the front cover of the April issue of Music Tech magazine and released two sound design packs through Loopmasters which have received several positive reviews. S:amplify also provided the sound design for the Japanese synthesizer KDJ One and were appointed musical directors for the City of Sydney New Year's Eve fireworks show. The 2011/2012 12-minute NYE Fireworks show on Sydney Harbour showcased 24 Australian songs including original composition from Abrahams and Carbone.

Since around 2015, Abrahams has been working with Johnny "Galvatron" as part of the video game studio Beethoven & Dinosaur to compose music for The Artful Escape (November 2021). Since 2017, he has performed, recorded and toured with YID!, also producing (with Simon Starr, as the Kvetch Brothers) their second album, Zets!. Alongside Abrahams and Starr other musicians were Husky Gawenda, Gideon Preiss, Audrey Powne, Cheryl Durongpisitkul, Alex Burkoy and Willy Zygier with two of his daughters Alma and Syd Zygier.

== Discography ==
=== Studio albums ===
List of studio albums, with selected details and chart positions
| Title | Album details | Peak chart positions | |
| Title | Album details | AUS | NZ |
|---|---|---|---|
| The Satyricon | Released: 1996; Label: Worldwide Ultimatum Records; Formats: CD | — | — |
| Sweet Distorted Holiday | Released: 1998; Label: Prozaac Recordings; Formats: CD | 59 | 50 |
| Stuck in a Groove (as Puretone) | Released: 2002; Label: Festival Mushroom; Formats: CD | — | — |

=== Singles ===
List of singles, with selected chart positions and certifications
| Title | Year | Peak chart positions | | | | | | Certifications | Album |
| Title | Year | AUS | GER | NZ | SWI | UK | U.S. Dance | Certifications | Album |
|---|---|---|---|---|---|---|---|---|---|
| "Scenes from the Satyricon Part I" | 1995 | — | — | — | — | — | — | | Non-album singles |
| "Scenes from the Satyricon Part 2" | 1995 | — | — | — | — | — | — | | Non-album singles |
| "Thrill Seeker" | 1998 | — | — | 49 | — | — | — | | Sweet Distorted Holiday |
| "Addicted to Bass" (featuring Amiel Daemion) | 1998 | 15 | — | 27 | — | — | — | ARIA: Gold | Sweet Distorted Holiday |
| "Headroom" (featuring Amiel Daemion) | 1999 | 146 | — | — | — | — | — | | Sweet Distorted Holiday |
| "Rollin" | 2000 | 58 | — | — | — | — | — | | Non-album single |
Credited as Puretone
| "Addicted to Bass" (re-release) | 2002 | 50 | 58 | — | 60 | 2 | 1 | BPI: Platinum | Stuck in a Groove |
| "Stuck in a Groove" | 2002 | — | — | — | — | 26 | 4 | | Stuck in a Groove |
| "Addicted to Bass" (Dom Dolla Relapse) | 2026 | — | — | — | — | — | — | | Non-album single |

== Awards ==
=== ARIA Music Awards ===
The ARIA Music Awards is an annual awards ceremony that recognises excellence, innovation, and achievement across all genres of Australian music. Abrahams has won two awards from six nominations.

| Year | Nominee / work | Award | Result |
|---|---|---|---|
| 1999 | "Addicted to Bass" | Single of the Year | Nominated |
| 1999 | "Addicted to Bass" | Best Video (Craig Melville and David Curry) | Nominated |
| 1999 | Sweet Distorted Holiday | Best Male Artist | Nominated |
| 1999 | Sweet Distorted Holiday | Best Dance Release | Won |
| 1999 | Sweet Distorted Holiday | Best Independent Release | Won |
| 1999 | Josh Abrahams for Sweet Distorted Holiday | Engineer of the Year | Nominated |
| 2026 | "Addicted to Bass" (with Dom Dolla) | Best Dance/Electronic Release | Nominated |
| 2026 | "Addicted to Bass" (with Dom Dolla) | Best Video | Nominated |

=== APRA Awards ===
The APRA Awards are held in Australia and New Zealand by the Australasian Performing Right Association to recognise songwriting skills, sales and airplay performance by its members annually. Abrahams has been nominated once.

| Year | Nominee / work | Award | Result |
|---|---|---|---|
| 1999 | "Addicted to Bass" | Song of the Year | Nominated |
| 2026 | Mixtape (with Jonathan Tron) | Best Music for a Video Game of Other Media | Nominated |

== See also ==
- List of number-one dance hits (United States)
- List of artists who reached number one on the US Dance chart
