= The Galvatrons =

Australian rock band

- Origin: Geelong, Victoria, Australia
- Genres: Rock, electronica, electronic rock
- Years active: 2007–present
- Label: Warner Music
- Members: Johnny "Galvatron"; Pete "Gamma"; Pete Convery "Condor"; Robert Convery "Bozza"; Lee Hartney
- Website: myspace.com/thegalvatrons

The Galvatrons are a four-piece rock band who formed on 28 August 2007, in Geelong, Australia.

== Biography ==
=== Origins ===
According to lead singer Johnny Galvatron, the band got their name from the 1986 Transformers movie.

=== When We Were Kids (2008) ===
The band released their debut single, When We Were Kids, in 2008. On 3 May 2008, they released their debut EP of the same name on Warner Music Australia. The title track was the number one most added track on radio in Australia for the week 19–26 April 2008. They played the Big Day Out, Meredith and Cherry Rock festivals in 2007 and 2008. They also toured Australia throughout 2008. They also played a festival tour in the United Kingdom alongside The Police at London's Hyde Park.

The Galvatrons were the support act for Def Leppard and Cheap Trick during Def Leppard's Songs From The Sparkle Lounge Australian tour.

=== Laser Graffiti (2009) ===
On 17 November 2008, the Galvatrons released "Robots Are Cool", a demo from their upcoming debut album. The song was available as a free download via the band's official Myspace. Several days later, the band posted on Myspace that they would be recording their debut album soon, with an intended release date of April 2009. The album, Laser Graffiti, was released in July 2009.

=== The Artful Escape (2017-present) ===
In 2017, it was announced that The Galvatrons had formed a game studio called Beethoven & Dinosaur. In 2021, the studio released its first game, The Artful Escape, directed by Johnny Galvatron.

In 2026, Beethoven & Dinosaur released their second game, Mixtape, directed by Johnny Galvatron.

== Influences ==
The Galvatrons cite their influences as Devo, Stan Bush, Australian Crawl, Van Halen, Lion, Cheap Trick, Kim Wilde, Queen, Stevie Nicks, Pat Benatar, Kenny Loggins, Tears for Fears and Gary Numan.

== Members ==
- Johnny Galvatron – vocals, guitar
- Robert Convery Bozza – percussion
- Pete Convery OG Conepuller – bass
- Pete Gamma – keyboard/synth
- Manny Bourakis "Ultra Fang" – original drummer

== Discography ==
=== Albums ===
List of albums, with Australian chart positions
Title	Album details	Peak chart positions
Title	Album details	AUS
Laser Graffiti	Released: July 2009; Label: Mushroom (5186-54187-2); Format: CD	61

=== Extended plays ===
List of EPs, with Australian chart positions
Title	EP details	Peak chart positions
Title	EP details	AUS
When We Were Kids	Released: May 2008; Label: Mushroom (5144-27172-2); Format: CD	39
