= Dove TV =

Italian television channel

Travel & Living by Dove TV
- Country: Italy
- Broadcast area: Italy

Programming
- Language: Italian

Ownership
- Owner: Cairo Communication

History
- Launched: 18 February 2010; 16 years ago (linear broadcasting); 14 June 2023; 2 years ago (FAST broadcasting, on Samsung TV Plus)
- Closed: 1 July 2020; 5 years ago (linear broadcasting)
- Former names: Dove - Travel & Trends TV (2010-2023)

Availability

Streaming media
- Samsung TV Plus: Internet protocol television

Travel & Living by Dove TV is an Italian television channel owned by Cairo Communication. The channel broadcasts programs related to lifestyle and travel. It is only available on Samsung TV Plus.

== History ==
The channel was launched as Dove - Travel & Trends TV on 18 February 2010 on the Sky Italia platform. It was available on there since its launch date. It was available on channel 412.

The channel's programming, dedicated to lifestyle and travel, was composed of 25% of original productions, and 75% of programs acquired by the network.

The channel's programming was based on the Dove magazine, edited by RCS MediaGroup. On 28 December 2011, the channel began broadcasting on 16:9 format. After four years of activity, on 28 September 2014, the channel moves on channel 413 on the Sky Italia platform.

The channel's logo was the same used in the magazine, slightly rectified for use as brand extension and the claim "Travel and Trends".

In May 2018, it was announced that the channel would close on 30 June, following a failed contract renewal, but it did not happen.

On 1 July 2020, the channel closed. At the time of the closure the channel's speaker was Alberto Bognanni.

On 14 June 2023, the channel returned, but only on Samsung TV Plus.

== Programming ==
- Chi sceglie la seconda casa?
- Conosco un posticino
- Escape to the Country
- Extreme Collectors
- Grand Designs
- Hidden Potential
- Homes by the Med
- I viaggi di Dove
- La seconda casa non si scorda mai
- Location, Location, Location
- Magnifica Italia
- Una gita fuoriporta
