= Sweet Distorted Holiday =

Studio album by Josh Abrahams
- Released: November 1998
- Label: Prozaac Recordings
- Producer: Josh G Abrahams

Josh Abrahams chronology
The Satyricon (1996)	Sweet Distorted Holiday (1998)	Stuck in a Groove (2002)

Singles from Sweet Distorted Holiday
- 1. "Thrill Seeker" Released: July 1998; 2. "Addicted to Bass" Released: 5 October 1998; 3. "Headroom" Released: 1999

Sweet Distorted Holiday is the second and final studio album released by Australian electronica music producer Josh Abrahams. It was released in 1998 and peaked at number 59 in Australia and 50 in New Zealand.

At the ARIA Music Awards of 1999, the album won two awards, Best Dance Release and Best Independent Release.

== Track listing ==
No.	Title	Length
1.	"Open Sesame"	2:22
2.	"Bloodlust"	5:06
3.	"Addicted to Bass"	3:56
4.	"This Is Not a Test"	2:40
5.	"Radio Jordan"	6:38
6.	"Thrillseeker"	3:43
7.	"Headroom"	4:30
8.	"The Breakup Song"	4:01
9.	"St Patrick's Day (A Linear Model)"	2:55
10.	"Free"	5:52
11.	"Dudley Street"	4:15
12.	"1 and 9"	7:13
13.	"Wave Goodbye"	9:15
14.	"Close Sesame"	2:20

Bonus Disc
No.	Title	Length
1.	"Addicted to Bass" (Lords Garden Dub Buttons mix)	4:02
2.	"Headroom" (F.I.S.T. remix)	4:53
3.	"Thrillseeker" (Friendly "King of the Rhodes" remix)	4:58
4.	"Headroom" (Gerling Orphans in Waco mix)	4:01
5.	"Thrillseker" (GENku 8 Bit mix)	5:47
6.	"Addicted unplugged"	3:03

== Charts ==
Chart (1998)	Peak position
Australian Albums (ARIA)	59
New Zealand Albums (RMNZ)	50
