= Addicted to Bass =

1998 single by Josh Abrahams and Amiel Daemion

Single by Josh Abrahams and Amiel Daemion

from the album Sweet Distorted Holiday
- Released: 5 October 1998
- Genre: Drum and bass
- Length: 3:51
- Label: Prozaac (1998); Festival Mushroom (2002)
- Songwriters: Josh Abrahams; Amiel Daemion
- Producer: Josh Abrahams

Josh Abrahams singles chronology
"Thrill Seeker" (1998)	"Addicted to Bass" (1998)	"Headroom" (1999)

Amiel Daemion singles chronology
"Addicted to Bass" (1998)	"Headroom" (1999)

"Addicted to Bass" is a song by Josh Abrahams (Puretone) and Amiel Daemion, featuring Daemion on vocals. It originally appeared on Abrahams' 1998 album, Sweet Distorted Holiday, and was later included on the 2002 album Stuck in a Groove—credited to Abrahams' alias Puretone. The original release reached number 15 in Australia and number 27 in New Zealand, while the 2002 remix version by Apollo 440 reached number two on the UK Singles Chart and number one on the US Billboard Dance Club Play chart.

In 2015, the song was listed at number 14 in In the Mix's '100 Greatest Australian Dance Tracks of All Time' with Nick Jarvis saying "With its memorable, sing-along vocals, nudge-wink drug references and – best of all – that monstrous pre-dubstep bassline paired with scattershot jungle breakbeats, it was a perfect fusion of radio-friendly pop smarts and club madness".

== Australian success ==
Abrahams met Amiel in 1997. They collaborated in the writing and recording of his album Sweet Distorted Holiday, released in 1998, and the single was credited to Josh Abrahams and Amiel Daemion. The song became a hit when released on Shock Records in 1998 reaching the top 20 of the Australian charts and eventually being certified. The Australian Record Industry Association listed the song as its 100th best-selling single for 1998 in its end of year chart. The song was also popular in the Triple J Hottest 100, 1998 being voted at number 16 and appearing on the compilation CD.

The song also enjoyed a strong critical response. It was nominated for the Australian Performing Right Association "Song of the Year" in the awards held in May 1999, losing to "Buses and Trains" by Bachelor Girl. Abrahams was nominated for five Australian Recording Industry Association Awards in 1999 including "Record of the Year" and "Music Video of the Year" for "Addicted to Bass". While "Addicted to Bass" lost out to "The Day You Come" by Powderfinger in the "Record of the Year", he won in the "Best Independent Release" and "Best Dance Artist Album" categories for Sweet Distorted Holiday.

== European single ==
The song gradually became popular in dance clubs in the UK and received a positive response in the media. UKmix.net wrote: "This slice of Australian vocal drum & bass has been tearing up dancefloors, radio stations, and particularly music television for some time now." The song was credited to Puretone to avoid confusion with Josh Abraham who worked with Limp Bizkit and Staind.

The song was officially released in the United Kingdom on 7 January 2002. The week before its release, several retailers accidentally made the single available for purchase, causing it to debut at number 68 on the UK Singles Chart on 6 January, selling 809 copies. The next week, it rose to number two, beaten to the top spot by "More than a Woman", a posthumous number one for Aaliyah. "Addicted to Bass" also reached number 18 in Ireland and was a modest hit in the rest of Europe.

== Music video ==
=== Australian video ===
The original 1998 music video featured Amiel at GL Pro Sound, a high-end car audio store in Essendon, Victoria, sitting in a car, with installers working on a Holden VR Commodore and a Ford EL Falcon, installing various audio equipment. The Soundstream SPL series woofers were often shown operating on the heavy bassline of the song. Rockford Fosgate amplifiers, Image Dynamics speakers, JL Audio woofers, and Alpine head units were also featured. Josh Abrahams is shown performing on the decks on the screen of the Alpine headunit.

The video was nominated for Best Video at the ARIA Music Awards of 1999.

=== European video ===
The European Music Video was inspired by the 1979 movie Mad Max, filmed using the same roads in the You Yangs region of Australia and also featured actors Megan Dorman and Kick Gurry. The video was conceived and directed by Jolyon Watkins (Exit Films, Australia) and was a finalist for music promo of the year of the 2002 Muzik Magazine awards.

The video begins with two bored girls (played by Dorman and Amiel Daemion herself) getting off a bus and looking for some fun, until they spot a black modified unoccupied 1974 Ford Falcon (XB) which resembles the iconic V8 Interceptor Pursuit Special from Mad Max parked next to a Bank of Australasia in Lancefield, Victoria. They steal it, but before they could drive off, two male bank robbers have robbed the bank and attempt to flee the scene in the car as it was theirs. They notice the girls inside, who immediately speed off with the robbers bag of stolen money. In the confusion, the robbers are arrested by police.

The girls enjoy their joyride through the country roads until they are pursued by two Main Force Patrol (MFP) officers in a yellow interceptor that resembles to the ones used in the opening chase sequence in Mad Max. Ultimately the girls find the bag of stolen money in the backseat along with an explosive dye bomb planted inside, they subdue the MFP officers by throwing the dye bomb at their interceptor's windscreen, making them lose sight and spin out in the process thus the officers start fighting.

Afterwards another MFP officer (played by Gurry) is called in and pursues the duo, he then stops his interceptor and waits for the girls just as they are speeding towards him. They both play a game of chicken with their cars and ultimately the MFP officer spins out but continues to pursuit.

The climax ends with both the MFP officer and the girls go neck-and-neck down the road. The MFP officer takes off his sunglasses to get a clear view of the girls, until they brake off and the MFP officer without watching, crashes his interceptor straight through a caravan towed by a broken down pick-up truck, similar to the stunt in Mad Max.

The MFP officer climbs out of his vehicle unharmed and looks at the girls in disappointment and defeat, they then once again speed off into the distance.

== Track listings ==
1998 Australian CD single

1. "Addicted to Bass" (original version)
2. "Addicted to Bass" (Lords Garden Dub Buttons mix)
3. "Addicted to Bass" (Lords Garden Reef Fried mix)
4. "En voyage" (1965 Melbourne University Language Dept. mix)

2002 Australian and UK CD single; UK cassette single

1. "Addicted to Bass" (Apollo 440 mix)
2. "Addicted to Bass" (original version)
3. "Addicted to Bass" (Different Gear mix)

UK 12-inch single

A. "Addicted to Bass" (Different Gear mix)
B. "Addicted to Bass" (John Creamer & Stephane K mix)

European CD1

1. "Addicted to Bass" (original version)
2. "Addicted to Bass" (Beats Intro mix)

European CD2

1. "Addicted to Bass" (original version)
2. "Addicted to Bass" (Beats Intro mix)
3. "Addicted to Bass" (Different Gear mix)
4. "Addicted to Bass" (video version)

European CD3

1. "Addicted to Bass" (original version)
2. "Addicted to Bass" (John Creamer & Stephane K mix)
3. "Addicted to Bass" (Hyper & Rhymes mix)
4. "Addicted to Bass" (Solid Groove dub)

== Charts ==
=== Weekly charts ===
Chart (1998–1999)	Peak position
Australia (ARIA)	15
New Zealand (Recorded Music NZ)	27

Chart (2002)	Peak position
Australia (ARIA)	50
Belgium (Ultratop 50 Flanders)	35
Europe (Eurochart Hot 100)	20
Germany (GfK)	58
Greece (IFPI)	39
Ireland (IRMA)	18
Ireland Dance (IRMA)	3
Romania (Romanian Top 100)	36
Scotland Singles (OCC)	2
Switzerland (Schweizer Hitparade)	60
UK Singles (OCC)	2
UK Dance (OCC)	3
UK Indie (OCC)	1
US Dance Club Play (Billboard)	1
US Maxi-Singles Sales (Billboard)	14

=== Year-end charts ===
Chart (1998)	Position
Australia (ARIA)	100

Chart (2002)	Position
UK Singles (OCC)	37
UK Airplay (Music Week)	38
US Dance Club Play (Billboard)	19

== Certifications ==
Region	Certification	Certified units/sales
Australia (ARIA)	Gold	35,000^{^}
United Kingdom (BPI)	Silver	200,000^{^}
^{^} Shipments figures based on certification alone.

== Release history ==
Region	Date	Format(s)	Label(s)	Ref.
Australia	5 October 1998	CD	Prozaac	
United Kingdom	7 January 2002	12-inch vinyl; CD; cassette	Gusto	
Australia (remix)	1 April 2002	CD	Festival Mushroom	
Worldwide (Dom Dolla relapse)	6 March 2026	Digital download	TMRW Music	

== See also ==
- List of number-one dance singles of 2002 (U.S.)
- List of UK Independent Singles Chart number ones of 2002
