= Future Sound of Melbourne =

Australian electronic music group

- Origin: Melbourne
- Genres: House, techno, electronic
- Years active: 1990–present
- Labels: Candyline Records, Two Thumbs Records
- Members: Davide Carbone; Josh Abrahams; Steve Robbins

Future Sound of Melbourne (also known as FSOM) is an Australian electronic group formed in Melbourne in 1990. At the ARIA Music Awards of 1996, they won the award for Best Dance Release for their album, Chapter One.

== Career ==
Future Sound of Melbourne were an Australian electronic music trio formed in 1990 by bass and drum producer, Davide Carbone, bass guitarist and vocalist, Josh Abrahams, and acid house DJ, Steve Robbins.

In October 1995, the group released Chapter One. At the ARIA Music Awards of 1996, the album won the ARIA Award for Best Dance Release.

Abrahams left the group in 1995 to start his solo career, later performing as Puretone. Carbone relocated to the United Kingdom in 1998 where he established a record label, BS1 Records. Carbone and Robbins performed as FSOM at the Roskilde Festival in Denmark in 1999.

== Discography ==
=== Studio albums ===
List of studio albums, with selected details
Title	Album details
Chapter One	Released: October 1995; Label: Volition Records (Voltcd112); Formats: CD
Prologue	Released: June 1999; Label: FSOM (FSOM004); Formats: CD

=== Compilation albums ===
List of compilation albums, with selected details
Title	Album details
The 90's Anthology	Released: 30 June 2017; Label: FSOM (FSOM005); Formats: Digital download

=== Extended plays ===
List of Extended Plays, with selected details
Title	EP details
Meglamania	Released: 1992; Label: FSOM (FSOM001); Formats: 12" LP
Wear 'n' Tear	Released: 1992; Label: FSOM (FSOM002); Formats: 12" LP
Beyond	Released: July 1993; Label: Candyline Records (CANDY006); Formats: 12" LP
The Avatar EP	Released: 1994; Label: Candyline Records (CANDY011); Formats: 12" LP

=== Singles ===
List of singles, with selected chart positions and certifications
Title	Year	Album
"Melodia" / "Alien 8"	1992	non album single
"Shivaratri"	1993	non album single
"Flashflood"	1995	Chapter One

== Awards ==
=== ARIA Music Awards ===
The ARIA Music Awards is an annual awards ceremony that recognises excellence, innovation, and achievement across all genres of Australian music. They commenced in 1987. Future Sound of Melbourne won one award.

Year	Nominee / work	Award	Result
1996	Chapter One	Best Dance Release	Won
