= The Artful Escape =

2021 video game

- Developers: Beethoven & Dinosaur
- Publisher: Annapurna Interactive
- Director: Johnny Galvatron
- Producers: Justin Blackwell; Dean Woodward
- Programmer: Sean Slevin
- Composers: Johnny Galvatron; Josh Abrahams
- Engine: Unreal Engine 4
- Platforms: Windows; Xbox One; Xbox Series X/S; Nintendo Switch; PlayStation 4; PlayStation 5
- Release: Windows, Xbox One, Series X/S; September 9, 2021; Switch, PS4, PS5; January 25, 2022
- Genre: Platform
- Mode: Single-player

The Artful Escape is a platform video game developed by Beethoven & Dinosaur and published by Annapurna Interactive. The game was originally released on September 9, 2021 for Windows, Xbox One, and Xbox Series X/S, and for Nintendo Switch, PlayStation 4, and PlayStation 5 on January 25, 2022.

== Gameplay ==
The Artful Escape is a platform game, where the player controls Francis in moving him across a musical-infused landscape. Besides running and jumping, Francis has a guitar which he can play to create various effects, such as interacting with the scenery or facing boss characters.

== Plot ==
The fictional town of Calypso, Colorado is the birthplace of the deceased folk-music legend, Johnson Vendetti. On the 20th anniversary of his groundbreaking album during the 1970s, the town is holding a large festival, and Johnson's nephew, Francis Vendetti (Michael Johnston), is expected to play Johnson's folk songs at a concert. However, Francis struggles with living in the shadow of his uncle and follow folk music when he really wants to play rock music. The day before the concert, he meets an odd woman, Violetta (Caroline Kinley), who dares him to take risks, such as climbing a tree he had been scared of climbing before. She tells Francis to look for Lightman's before she heads off, despite Francis not knowing of any such place in Calypso.

That night, Francis is visited by an alien Zomm (Jason Schwartzman) who tells him he must meet Lightman. Recalling Violetta's words, he follows Zomm to find Lightman (Carl Weathers in his final voice acting role), a guitarist that says he needs Francis to play as his opening act. Francis follows Lightman and Zomm through an impossible space below Calypso and finds himself in the Cosmic Extraordinary as they head towards the Cosmic Lung, Lightman's ship. Once there, Lightman explains that to travel through the Cosmic Extraordinary, they need to put on a show for the Glamourgonn (Courtenay Taylor) to gain clearance for the next station, which will be the only way Francis will be able to get back to Calypso in time for the concert. Francis discovers Violetta works as the head of Lightman's laser show but has reservations for Lightman's plans for Francis.

For Francis to be able to perform as Lightman's opening act, he first must travel to meet Stargordon (Mark Strong), a talent agent. There, Stargordon helps Francis conceive of a new name and identity to help sell himself, though senses that the weight of Johnson's influence still haunts Francis' life. With this identity, Francis performs for the Heliotromm, who is impressed with his performance and offers to broadcast it across the galaxy, but Francis declines, still fearing drawing attention to himself. Lightman then sends Francis to the planet of Glimmerdimm to play at a highly exclusive nightclub, but after his performance, Francis finds the only way back is to locate the warp turtle, held in fashion-strict Glimmer City. An alien, Frida, helps Francis to create a new outfit purposely to cause a ruckus in Glimmer City and reach the turtle.

Back at the Cosmic Organ, Francis learns that Lightman is no longer captain of the ship but instead Francis has been promoted due to his performances. Feeling guilty, Francis offers Lightman to be his opening act but allows Lightman to select the stage. Lightman heads to the Hyperion Wailzone, where the Glamourgonn lives. Violetta tells Francis that Lightman was the only person to have performed and survived the Glamourgonn twenty years ago and may be trying to recapture his glory. Francis follows and eventually meets with the Glamourgonn's agent, the Tastemaker (Lena Headey), to arrange to see the Glamourgonn. She sees that Francis still has doubts about accepting this new identity and reveals that when Lightman had faced him, he had brought Johnson Vendetti along, who himself had disliked the folk music he wrote about. Because Francis is still in doubt, she denies both from seeing the Glamourgonn. Francis comes to an epiphany and comes to fully accept his new persona, and demonstrates this to the Tastemaker. She sees Francis has changed, and allows him to perform for the Glamourgonn. Francis's performance, aided by Violetta's laser show, impresses the Glamourgonn, and she grants passage for the Cosmic Lung as well as providing them with a separate vehicle.

Violetta returns Francis back to Calypso, well after the concert was to go on, and promises that she will come back to see him some day. Francis goes to perform at the planned after-party event, showcasing his rock styling and new persona and stunning the crowd.

== Development ==
The Artful Escape was conceived of by Johnny "Galvatron", founding mainstay lead guitarist of Australian rock band the Galvatrons. Prior to forming the band, Galvatron had studied film and computer animation in college in Melbourne, Australia, but then formed The Galvatrons and had a record deal with Warner Bros. shortly after graduation. During the nearly ten years he spent with the band, he also continued his interest in video games, submitted some articles for various publications and creating small games based on the band's music while they toured Australia and the United Kingdom. Galvatron grew weary from the long tours and had been drawn more into the artistic goals. The band eventually went on hiatus, which allowed Galvatron to pursue other creative efforts, including writing a book, creating a short film, and eventually into game development.

The Artful Escape, as described by Galvatron, is a story in the vein of "David Bowie traveling off from London on an interstellar trip to create Ziggy Stardust". In addition to Bowie, Galvatron cited works by Stanley Kubrick, Wes Anderson and Steven Spielberg to help establish the art style he used for the game, as well as using his own experiences from the music touring and the music industry. Some of the character and world designs are based on doodles that Galvatron made in his school books when he was younger. Johnson Vendetti is based on folk music legend Bob Dylan, according to Galvatron.

Galvatron formed Beethoven & Dinosaur, an Australian studio, to work on the game. The studio includes composer Josh Abrahams, guitarist Eden Altman and programmers Justin Blackwell and Sean Slevin. The studio received $17,000 from an Unreal Dev Grant from Epic Games for The Artful Escape of Francis Vendetti in June 2015 to help them develop the title on the Unreal Engine 4. The studio then got approval through the Steam Greenlight program for publishing on the Steam platform in the following month. The studio launched a Kickstarter in March 2016 to secure about $35,000 in additional funds for completing the Microsoft Windows and OS X version of the game. However, the Kickstarter failed to raise sufficient funds, but the studio was able to secure a publication deal with Annapurna Interactive to continue development of the game, and allowing for development of console versions on the PlayStation 4 and Xbox One.

The game, still under the name The Artful Escape of Francis Vendetti, was first shown in playable form at PAX East during March 2017. The game had a larger reveal during the Electronic Entertainment Expo 2017 that June as a featured title in Microsoft's press conference, where it was revealed that the game would have a console-exclusive release on the Xbox One. At Microsoft's Xbox London event in November 2019, the game was confirmed for a 2020 release date on Xbox One, Microsoft Windows, and for iOS devices via Apple Arcade. In November 2020, Annapurna Interactive confirmed that the game was delayed to 2021.

The game was one featured during Annapurna Interactive's July 2021 showcase. In addition to the planned September 9, 2021 release, it was shown that the game would include voicework from Michael Johnston as Francis, Caroline Kinley as Violetta, along with supporting voice work from Lena Headey (the Tastemaker), Jason Schwartzman (Zomm), Mark Strong (Stargordon), and Carl Weathers (Lightman).

Beethoven & Dinosaur were the recipients of a small business grant from the City of Melbourne in 2017.

== Reception ==
Reception

Aggregate scores
Aggregator	Score
Metacritic	PC: 80/100; XONE: 80/100; XSX: 81/100; NS: 77/100; PS5: 81/100
OpenCritic	78% recommend

Review scores
Publication	Score
Edge	7/10
Eurogamer	Recommended
Game Informer	8.5/10
GameSpot	8/10
GamesRadar+	4.5/5
IGN	8/10
Nintendo Life	8/10
PC Gamer (US)	75/100
Push Square	7/10
Shacknews	6/10
The Guardian	4/5
VideoGamer.com	5/10

The Artful Escape received "generally favorable" reviews, according to review aggregator Metacritic. Fellow review aggregator OpenCritic assessed that the game received strong approval, being recommended by 78% of critics.

GamesRadar+ praised the voice cast, singling out the performances of Michael Johnston and Caroline Kinley as helping to "ground the world in human emotion". GameSpot praised the game's art and aesthetic, but criticized the writing, saying that the cast "speak in strange metaphors that aim for artful but end up hitting hackneyed". IGN enjoyed the levels and the audio of The Artful Escape, writing that "the performances of its cast and the quality of its soundtrack are every bit as stellar as the eye-popping celestial realms it crisscrosses through".

Rachel Watts of PC Gamer felt that the gameplay of The Artful Escape did live up to visuals, saying: "The Artful Escape's musical guitar mechanics never reach the heights of its showstopping visuals". The Guardian praised the message of the game, describing it as "a touching tale of how to break free of the creative expectations of others". Kotaku was critical of the short length of the musical puzzles sequences, writing that it was "not long enough to enjoy the proceedings". Rock Paper Shotgun's Matthew Castle wished the game had more replayability beyond the initial playthrough, saying the game was "An awesome ride, but it does mean you've heard everything it has to offer in a couple of hours". Polygon cited it as the 44th best game of 2021, saying the game offered "the most over-the-top, luxurious, self-indulgent, entertaining moments of any game this year." Push Square gave the game seven stars out of ten, praising its guitar battles, art direction, soundtrack, writing, and voicing while criticizing the lack of substantial gameplay, frame drops, and occasionally clunky platforming. Nintendo Life reviewed the Switch port of the game, giving it eight stars, lauding its sights, sounds, and imaginative ideas while taking issue with the underused best bits, light gameplay, and sacrifices made to port the game to the Switch.

=== Accolades ===
Year	Organization	Award	Result	Ref.
2021	Golden Joystick Awards	Best Audio	Nominated	
2021	Golden Joystick Awards	Best Visual Design	Nominated	
2021	Golden Joystick Awards	Xbox Game of the Year	Nominated	
2021	The Game Awards 2021	Best Art Direction	Nominated	
2021	The Game Awards 2021	Best Score and Music	Nominated	
2021	The Game Awards 2021	Best Debut Indie Game	Nominated	
2022	25th Annual D.I.C.E. Awards	Outstanding Achievement in Game Direction	Nominated	
2022	18th British Academy Games Awards	Artistic Achievement	Won	
2022	18th British Academy Games Awards	Audio Achievement	Nominated	
2022	18th British Academy Games Awards	Debut Game	Nominated	
