= Loopmasters =

- Founded: 2003
- Founder: Matt Pelling
- Genre: Library music, sample packs
- Country of origin: United Kingdom
- Location: Brighton
- Official website: loopmasters.com loopcloud.com

Loopmasters is a sample, MIDI file and preset distributor founded in 2003.

The company releases sample packs covering a wide range of genres including house, drum and bass, techno, hip hop, cinematic music and more. Loopmasters also acts as a distribution platform for independent sample labels, and has collaborated with many established music producers to create sample packs and curate collections of sounds.

Loopmasters has a range of music production software that is integrated with the Loopmasters sample library.

Loopcloud is a subscription service that allows the user to search for sounds, samples, MIDI files and plugin presets based on genre, tempo and key. It can be synchronized with a user's DAW (digital audio workstation) through to allow synchronized auditioning and editing of samples.

Loopcloud DRUM and PLAY are standalone sample-based audio plugins integrated with Loopcloud and feature various playable kits and instruments.

== History ==
=== Early Business (CD distribution) ===
Loopmasters started releasing sample CDs in 2003, launching over 30 compilations of individual hits, loops and MIDI files. In 2006, due to frustration with third party distributors, Loopmasters began investment in their own digital distribution portal and in 2007 the first iteration of the Loopmasters website was released.

Users could buy and download samples and loops directly from the Loopmasters website, allowing Loopmasters to move away from CD-based sample packs.

=== Distributing Sublabels and Plugins ===
Between 2006 and 2015, Loopmasters continued to release sample packs, partnering with musicians for their Artist Series and distributing sample packs from a wide array of independent sample labels such as HY2ROGEN, Singomakers and IQ Samples. The company moved into the Echoplex Studio complex in Eastbourne, and expanded their product range to include plugins and virtual instruments.

In 2012, Loopmasters launched Plugin Boutique, a plugin distribution marketplace selling music software from more than 200 brands.

=== Loopcloud ===
In 2017, Loopmasters released Loopcloud, a DAW-integrated desktop application which could sort user's sample libraries, and be used to browse samples, MIDI files and presets using a range of search filters.

There have been several updates to the Loopcloud platform since 2017 including AI sample matching, sample editing, and audio effects. Loopcloud is now on version seven.

Loopmasters acquired the online music production school ProducerTech in 2017. ProducerTech offers music production courses taught by music producers such as MJ Cole, D.Ramirez, and Dave Seaman.

In 2020, Loopmasters was bought by Beatport, becoming part of The Beatport Group alongside other audio brands Plugin Boutique, and later LabelRadar and Ampsuite.

=== Re-acquisition ===
In 2025, original founder Matt Pelling bought Loopmasters back from Beatport. The acquisition was celebrated by some industry commentators as a move against the trend of corporate mergers in the audio industry.
