= APRA Music Awards of 1996 =

Annual Australian music awards

- Date: May 1996
- Location: Australia

The Australasian Performing Right Association Awards of 1996 (generally known as APRA Awards) are a series of awards held in May 1996. The APRA Music Awards were presented by Australasian Performing Right Association (APRA) and the Australasian Mechanical Copyright Owners Society (AMCOS). APRA and AMCOS did not provide any awards in 1997, after the hiatus they resumed the annual ceremony in APRA Music Awards of 1998.

Only one classical music award was available in 1996: Most Performed Contemporary Classical Composition. APRA provided awards for "Best Television Theme", and "Best Film Score" in 1996. APRA and AMCOS also sponsored the Australian Guild of Screen Composers (AGSC), which provided their own awards ceremony, from 1996 to 2000, with categories for film and TV composers.

== Awards ==
Nominees and winners with results indicated on the right.

=== APRA Music Awards ===
Song of the Year
Title	Artist	Writer	Result
"Caroline"	The Badloves	Debra Byrne, Michael Spiby	Nominated
"Pick You Up"	Powderfinger	Jonathan Coghill, John Collins, Bernard Fanning, Ian Haug, Darren Middleton	Nominated
"Waking Up Tired"	Hoodoo Gurus	David Faulkner, Bradley Shepherd	Nominated
"Wasn't It Good"	Tina Arena	Tina Arena, Robert Parde, Heather Field	Won
"Where the Wild Roses Grow"	Nick Cave and the Bad Seeds and Kylie Minogue	Nick Cave	Nominated
Songwriters of the Year
Writer			Result
Nick Cave			Won
Ted Albert Award for Outstanding Services to Australian Music
Name			Result
Ron Tudor			Won
Most Performed Australian Work
Title	Artist	Writer	Result
"Apple Eyes"	Swoop	Joshua Beagley, Roland Kapferer, Alexander Hewetson, Fiona Ta'Akimoeaka	Nominated
"Caroline"	The Badloves	Debra Byrne, Michael Spiby	Nominated
"Under the Water"	Merril Bainbridge	Merril Bainbridge, Owen Bolwell, Stanley Paulzen	Won
"Wasn't It Good"	Tina Arena	Tina Arena, Robert Parde, Heather Field	Nominated
"Where the Wild Roses Grow"	Nick Cave and the Bad Seeds and Kylie Minogue	Nick Cave	Nominated
Most Performed Australian Work Overseas
Title	Artist	Writer	Result
"Tomorrow"	Silverchair	Daniel Johns, Benjamin Gillies	Won
Most Performed Children's Work
Title	Artist	Writer	Result
"Grand Fairies Ball"	Christine Hutchinson	Christine Hutchinson	Nominated
"Growin' Up Strong"	Wendy Notley	Barbara Notley, Wendy Notley, Al Rony, Donna Ross	Nominated
"The Hooley Dooleys"	The Hooley Dooleys	David Butts, Antoine Demarest, Bruce Thorburn	Nominated
"Just Hang Loose"	Incy Wincy	Leonie Cambage, Graham Sattler	Nominated
"Wake Up Jeff!"	The Wiggles	Murray Cook, Jeffrey Fatt, Anthony Field, Gregory Page	Won
Most Performed Country Work
Title	Artist	Writer	Result
"Don't Call Wagga Wagga Wagga"	Jim Haynes	Gregory Champion, James Haynes	Nominated
"Nine Mile Run"	Tania Kernaghan	Colin Buchanan, Tania Kernaghan, Fiona Kernaghan	Nominated
"1959"	Lee Kernaghan	Garth Porter, Lee Kernaghan	Won
"Skinny Dippin'"	Lee Kernaghan	Garth Porter, Lee Kernaghan, Colin Buchanan, Lawrence Minton	Nominated
"Somewhere out There"	Shanley Del	Shanley Del Gregory, Steven Daily	Nominated
Most Performed Foreign Work
Title	Artist	Writer	Result
"As I Lay Me Down"	Sophie B. Hawkins	Sophie B. Hawkins	Nominated
"Fairground"	Simply Red	Mick Hucknall	Nominated
"Give Me One Reason"	Tracy Chapman	Tracy Chapman	Nominated
"Kiss from a Rose"	Seal	Henry Samuel (p.k.a. Seal)	Won
"Lets Groove"	CDB	Maurice White, Wayne Vaughn	Nominated
Most Performed Jazz Work
Title	Artist	Writer	Result
"Ee Yoo Hoo"	Coco's Lunch	Nicola Eveleigh	Nominated
"Futures"	DIG	Samuel Dixon, Scott Saunders, James Robertson, Timothy Rollinson, Terepai Richmond	Won
"Mambo Gumbo"	Wanderlust	Miroslav Bukovsky	Nominated
"Tata"	Wanderlust	Francisco Hevia	Nominated
"Until"	Carl Orr	Carl Orr, Renée Geyer	Nominated
Most Performed Contemporary Classical Composition
Title	Composer	Performer	Result
Fantasy	Helen Gifford	Laura Chislett, the Flute in Orbit	Nominated
Flower Songs	Ross Edwards	Song Company and Friends	Nominated
In the Shuberry	Anthony Bremner	Song Company and Friends	Nominated
Sonata for Harp	Peggy Glanville-Hicks	Marshall Maguire	Won
To His Servant Bach God Grants a Final Glimpse – The Morning Star	Graeme Koehne	Marshall Maguire	Nominated
Best Film Score
Title		Composer	Result
All Men Are Liars		Mark Moffatt, Wayne Goodwin	Nominated
Angel Baby		John Clifford White	Nominated
Babe		Nigel Westlake	Won
Dad and Dave: On Our Selection		Peter Best	Nominated
Lilian's Story		Cezary Skubiszewski	Nominated
Mushrooms		Paul Grabowsky	Nominated
Talk		John Clifford White	Nominated
That Eye, the Sky		David Bridie, John Phillips	Nominated
Best Television Theme
Title		Composer	Result
Blue Murder		Peter Best	Nominated
Bordertown		Guy Gross	Nominated
Breaking the Ice		Robert Moss	Nominated
Correlli		Christopher Neal	Nominated
G.P.		Mario Millo	Won
Mercury		John Clifford White	Nominated
RPA		Geoffrey J Harvey	Nominated
Water Rats		Leslie Gock	Nominated

== See also ==
- Music of Australia
