= A Delicious Collection =

Compilation album by Deni Hines
- Released: 17 June 2002
- Genre: Pop
- Length: 64:33
- Label: Mushroom Records
- Producers: Ian Green, Rockmelons, Adam Reily, Donovan Germain, Kaylan, DON-E, Deni Hines, Phil Buckle, Will.i.am, Akhenaton, Eric Chevet

Deni Hines chronology
Remix Your Imagination (1997)	A Delicious Collection (2002)	Water for Chocolate (2006)

Singles from A Delicious Collection
- 1. "Frenzy" Released: 29 October 2001

Alternative cover
- The Definitive Collection

A Delicious Collection is the first compilation album by Australian singer songwriter, Deni Hines. The album was released in June 2002.

A Delicious Collection was re-released in August 2004 under the title The Definitive Collection.

== Track listings ==
No.	Title	Writer(s)	Length
1.	"It's Alright"	Ian Green, Michelle Lewis	3:33
2.	"Frenzy"		3:35
3.	"Joy"	Deni Hines, Ian Green	3:52
4.	"Ain't No Sunshine" (Rockmelons featuring Deni Hines)	Bill Withers	3:13
5.	"It's Not Over" (Rockmelons featuring Deni Hines)	Bryon Jones, John Kenny	6:25
6.	"That Word (L.O.V.E.)" (Rockmelons featuring Deni Hines)	Rashad Smith, Byron Jones, Jonathan Jones, Raymond Medhurst	4:06
7.	"Delicious" (featuring Don-E)	David Batteau, Danny Sembello	3:52
8.	"Made This Way"	Graham Edwards, Stacy Ferguson, Stefanie Ridel, Renee Sandstrom, Scott Spock	3:12
9.	"I Like the Way"	Ian Green, Deni Hines	3:50
10.	"Runnin'"	Darren Dowlut, Dennis Dowlut, Deni Hines	3:49
11.	"I'm Not in Love"	Eric Stewart, Graham Gouldman	6:02
12.	"Poetry Man"	Phoebe Snow	3:57
13.	"Do You Feel The Way I Do"	Deborah Cox, Lascelles Stephens	4:13
14.	"Pull Up to the Bumper" (Black Eyed Peas NY Summer Mix)	Kookoo Baya, Grace Jones, Dana Mano	3:58
15.	"Something About You"	Derek Bramble	3:11
16.	"What Makes You a Man"		3:45

== Release history ==
Region	Title	Date	Label	Format	Catalogue
Australia	A Delicious Collection	17 June 2002	Mushroom Records, Festival Records	CD, digital download	FMR 334832
Australia	The Definitive Collection	9 August 2004	Warner Music Australia	CD, digital download	337712
