= Ruino Vino =

Studio album by Mara!
- Released: 1995
- Recorded: September 1993
- Studio: ABC Studios, Sydney
- Label: Rufus Records
- Producer: Tony Garman

Mara! chronology
Don't Even Think (1990)	Ruino Vino (1995)	Sezoni (1997)

Ruino Vino is the fourth studio album by the Australian world music quintet, Mara!. It was released in 1995.

At the ARIA Music Awards of 1996, the album won the ARIA Award for Best World Music Album.

== Track listing ==
1. "Ruino Vino" - 1:40
2. "Men Suffer Too" - 1:50
3. "Fair Kop" - 3:43
4. "Ajde" - 4:36
5. "The Big Dance" - 2:30
6. "Dance of Dospat" - 6:23
7. "Lambkin" - 7:15
8. "Jove" - 3:30
9. "Past Carin'" - 7:10
10. "Llew's Blues" - 3:45
11. "Tu Madre" - 6:37
