= Jim Haynes (writer) =

Australian entertainer, poet, historian and songwriter (born 1948)

Jim Haynes OAM
- Born: James Albert Haynes; 1946 (age 79–80); Sydney, Australia
- Occupations: Writer; entertainer; broadcaster; humorist; songwriter; historian
- Spouse: Robyn McMillan
- Website: www.jimhaynes.com.au

Jim Haynes OAM (born 1948) is an Australian entertainer, bush poet, historian and songwriter. As of May 2025, he has published more than 30 books, all of which focus on Australian history, Australiana and bush poetry. As a musician, he is best known for the songs "Mow Ya Lawn" (1989), "Don't Call Wagga Wagga Wagga" (1994) and "Since Cheryl Went Feral" (1997). In 2016 he received a Medal of the Order of Australia for service to the performing arts as part of the Australia Day Honours.

== Early life and career ==
Born in 1948 in Sydney, Haynes' father was a Royal Navy officer stationed in Australia during the Second World War. After the war, he settled there with Haynes' mother, also a British migrant, who he had met during his service. Haynes grew up in Botany, New South Wales and attended Sydney Boys High School and Sydney Teachers College. He later earned two master's degrees in literature, one each from the University of New England and the University of Wales.

Haynes worked as an English teacher at Macintyre High School, Inverell High School and Gunnedah High School, as well as in Menindee. He was one of the original staff members at Macintyre, which opened in 1974. He retired from teaching to work full-time as a musician in 1988.

== Career ==
=== Music ===
While teaching in Inverell in 1977, Haynes formed the Bandy Bill & Co Bush Band. He left the group but returned in 1985. They recorded Modern Day Swaggies (1986) and Spinnin' Yarns, both on the indie label Hadley Records. At the same time, he worked weekends at 2NZ radio station and began contributing to the show Australia All Over on ABC. He moved back to Sydney in 1988 and released "Mow Ya Lawn", a comedy song, on Festival Records the following year. It was a finalist for a 1991 Tamworth Songwriting Association Award. Its B-side was a song about airline deregulation in Australia. He signed onto Festival's Kookaburra label in 1990 and subsequently wrote That Rugby League Album, which was the label's first release. In 1991, he and Russell Hannah released Sleepers and Rails, also on Kookaburra, an album of "railway music" inspired by rail transport in Australia. Its tracks featured other Australian folk singers include Ted Egan, Judy Small, Eric Bogle and John Broomhall.

In 1994, Massive Records released the song "Don't Call Wagga Wagga Wagga", which was co-written and produced by Greg Champion and performed by Haynes, Champion, and Ted Egan. The song charted at number 2 and Warner/Chappell Music then signed Haynes to a deal that included both songwriting and publishing. "Since Cheryl Went Feral", a single about Cheryl Kernot, spent 26 weeks in the country music charts, five of which were at number one. In 1994, he was also involved in the Bridge of Love Project along with other country artists to raise awareness of children's issues, such as homelessness, in Australia. The 1995 album Here I Am was composed primarily of songs written or co-written by Haynes. Felicity Urquhart made a guest appearance on the album. In 1997, he released It's Nothing Serious, also produced by Champion, on ABC Music. Haynes has toured with artists including Slim Dusty, Adam Brand, Melinda Schneider, Lee Kernaghan Greg Champion and Beccy Cole. In 2012, he released an album of new songs, Galah Occasion, featuring duets with Wayne Horsburgh and Melanie Dyer.

Haynes spent 15 years touring schools around the country with his children's educational show Singabout Australia. Singabout Australia is also the name of his label, on which he has released several of his albums and at least one book. Haynes served on the board of the Country Music Association of Australia for 15 years and hosted the Big Bush Brekky Variety Show at the Tamworth Country Music Festival for 32 years until his retirement in 2017. Haynes also co-founded the Stone The Crows Festival in Wagga Wagga with Grant Luhrs and Chrissy Eustace. It was held annually from 2013 to 2022 and was host to the gReyVee Awards, which recognised bush poets over 50.

=== Poetry and history ===
Haynes wrote his first book in the early 1990s and has since published more than 30 books. His first publications were bush poetry and centered on the imaginary town of Weelabarabak and its residents. This included I'll Have Chips!, which he debuted at the Tamsworth Festival in the mid-1990s. It won Book of the Year at the Australian Bush Laureate Awards in 1996. ABC Books published his short story compilation Memories of Weelabarabak in 1999. His subsequent books focused on Australian history, including the anthology The Book of Australian Popular Rhymed Verse (2008), which the Australian Bush Poets Association claimed was the "largest collection of Aussie rhymed verse ever", exceeding 800 pages. It was nominated for an award in the Australian Rhymed Verse (Book Form) category at the Tamworth Country Music Festival. He won Book of the Year awards at the Bush Laureates for An Australian Heritage of Verse (2001), An Australian Treasury of Popular Verse (2004) and The Book of Australian Popular Rhymed Verse (2009). Haynes also wrote a weekly column called Aussie Verse for the Australasian Post until the paper's closure in 2004.

His other books cover a wide range of topics and include All Aboard – Tales of Australian Railways (2004), On All Fronts – Australia's WW2 (2010), Australia's Most Unbelievable True Stories (2013) and Great Australian Rascals, Rogues and Ratbags (2022). Haynes joined 2UE's George and Paul show, hosted by George Moore and Paul B. Kidd, in 2001 as an Australiana expert. He remained on the show until it ended in 2019. In the 2020s, he has appeared on Overnights each week to talk about Australian history. Haynes also leads History and Heritage tours in different parts of Australia through Travelrite.

Haynes arranged the first Bush Poetry Fireside Festival in 1993 and co-founded the Australian Bush Laureate Awards in 1995. Both events are held annually at the Longyard Hotel in Tamworth.

== Personal life ==
Haynes and his wife Robyn McMillan curated an art show about the Sydney Harbour together in 2023. They lived in the Sydney suburbs of Kingsford in 2001 and Moore Park in 2024. Haynes is a supporter of the South Sydney Rabbitohs.

== Awards and honours ==
Year	Award/Honour	Work	Awarding body	Notes	Refs
1995	Comedy/ Novelty Song of the Year	"Weelabarabak for Me"	Tamworth Songwriters Awards		
1996	Comedy/ Novelty Song of the Year	"Don't Call Wagga Wagga Wagga"	Tamworth Songwriters Awards	Co-written with Greg Champion	
1996	Book of the Year	I'll Have Chips	Australian Bush Laureate Awards		
1997	Australian Country Music Hands of Fame		Australian Country Music Hall of Fame		
1997	Comedy/ Novelty Song of the Year	"Since Cheryl Went Feral"	Tamworth Songwriters Awards	Co-written with Roger Corbett	
1998	Album of the Year	Dipso Dan & Other Silly Buggers	Australian Bush Laureate Awards	Co-written with John Kane	
1999	Comedy/ Novelty Song of the Year	"The Video Song"	Tamworth Songwriters Awards	Co-written with Rita and Mary Schneider	
2001	Book of the Year	An Australian Heritage of Verse	Australian Bush Laureate Awards		
2004	Book of the Year	An Australian Treasury of Popular Verse	Australian Bush Laureate Awards		
2005	Comedy/ Novelty Song of the Year	"My Grandad"	Tamworth Songwriters Awards	Co-written with Michael Carr	
2009	Book of the Year	The Book of Australian Popular Rhymed Verse	Australian Bush Laureate Awards		
2015	Life Membership		Australian Country Music Association		
2016	Medal of the Order of Australia	Service to the performing arts	Governor-General of Australia	2016 Australia Day Honours	

== Solo albums ==
- 1990 :That Rugby League Album
- 1990: Jim Haynes Live
- 1990: I Lobster and Never Flounder
- 1991: Sleepers and Rails
- 1994: Here I Am (EMI)
- 1997: It's Nothing Serious (ABC Music)
- 1998: Dipso Dan & Other Silly Buggers (with John Kane)
- 1998: Ratbag (ABC Country)
- 1999: It's Not Cricket (ABC Music)
- 2002: Live - Life's a Laugh (Singabout Australia)
- 2004: Words of Wisdom (Compass Bros Records)
- 2011: The Decline Effect
- 2011: The Complete Jim Haynes Collection
- 2012: Galah Occasion (Singabout Australia)

== Books ==
- 1997: 'I'll Have Chips!' - The Weelabarabak Ballads, Singabout Australia. ISBN 978-064-622-447-3
- 1999: Memories of Weelabarabak – Stories of a Bush Town, ABC Books. ISBN 0733306306
- 2000: An Australian Heritage of Verse, ABC Books. ISBN 978-073-330-898-7
- 2002: An Australian Treasury of Popular Verse, ABC Books. ISBN 073-331-022-2
- 2003: Great Australian Drinking Stories, ABC Books. ISBN 073-331-326-4
- 2004: All Aboard – Tales of Australian Railways, ABC Books. With Russell Hannah. ISBN 073-331-499-6
- 2005: Cobbers – Stories of Gallipoli 1915, ABC Books. ISBN 978-073-331-593-0
- 2005: Great Australian Racing Stories, ABC Books. ISBN 073-331-600-X
- 2006: Great Australian Aviation Stories (with Jillian Dellit), ABC Books. ISBN 978-073-331-707-1
- 2008: The Book of Australian Popular Rhymed Verse, ABC Books. ISBN 978-073-331-904-4
- 2009: The Big Book of Verse for Aussie Kids, Allen & Unwin. ISBN 978-174-237-084-2
- 2009: The ABC Book of Australian Country Music, ABC Books. ISBN 978-073-332-566-3
- 2010: On All Fronts – Australia's WW2, ABC Books. ISBN 978-073-332-600-4
- 2010: The Great Australian Book of Limericks (second edition), Allen & Unwin. First edition published 2001. ISBN 978-174-237-327-0
- 2012: The Best Australian Sea Stories, Allen & Unwin. ISBN 978-174-237-125-2
- 2015: The Best Gallipoli Yarns and Forgotten Stories, Allen & Unwin. ISBN 978-176-011-179-3
- 2015: The Best Australian Yarns (second edition), Allen & Unwin. First published 2013. ISBN 978-176-011-306-3
- 2016: Australia's Best Unknown Stories (second edition), Allen & Unwin. First published 2014. ISBN 978-176-029-107-5
- 2017: The Big Book of Australian Racing Stories (second edition), Allen & Unwin. First edition published 2015. ISBN 978-176-063-240-3
- 2017: Great Australian Scams, Cons, and Rorts, Allen & Unwin. ISBN 978-176-029-650-6
- 2018: The Best Australian Trucking Stories (second edition), Allen & Unwin. First edition published 2011. ISBN 978-176-063-332-5
- 2018: Best Australian Drinking Stories, Allen & Unwin. ISBN 978-176-063-290-8
- 2018: Best Australian Racing Stories (second edition), Allen & Unwin. First edition published 2010. ISBN 978-176-063-331-8
- 2018: Australia's Most Unbelievable True Stories (second edition), Allen & Unwin. First edition published 2016. ISBN 978-176-063-241-0
- 2019: The Best Australian Bush Stories (second edition), Allen & Unwin. First edition published 2013. ISBN 978-176-052-907-9
- 2019: The Big Book of Australia's War Stories, Allen & Unwin. ISBN 978-176-087-561-9
- 2020: Adventurers, Pioneers and Misfits: Australia's Most Amazing True Life Stories, Allen & Unwin. ISBN 978-176-087-762-0
- 2022: Great Australian Rascals, Rogues and Ratbags, Allen & Unwin. ISBN 978-176-106-790-7
- 2023: Heroes, Rebels and Radicals of Convict Australia, Allen & Unwin. ISBN 978-176-118-797-1
- 2022: Great Furphies of Australian History, Allen & Unwin. ISBN 978-176-087-981-5
- 2024: The Big Book of Australian Yarns, Allen & Unwin. ISBN 978-1-76147-186-5
