= Six Mile High =

Australian musical group

- Also known as: Yummy Fur, 6 Mile High
- Origin: Perth, Western Australia
- Genres: Electronic Rock, Indie Rock
- Years active: 1991–98
- Labels: Salmonberry Records; Columbia; Offworld Sounds
- Past members: Travis Calley; Kiriakos Lucas; Andrei Mazandarani; Anton Mazandarani; Jerome Mazandarani; Julian Ralls

Six Mile High (or 6 Mile High) were a Western Australian electronic rock band originally named Yummy Fur. Formed in Perth in 1991 by Travis Calley on keyboards, programming and saxophone, Kiriakos Lucas on guitar, and Julian Ralls on guitar, together with the three Mazandarani brothers, Andrei on vocals and programming, Anton on drums and percussion, and Jerome on bass guitar. They changed their name when they signed with Sony and then relocated to Melbourne.

In 1996 they left Sony, went back to being Yummy Fur and released an album, One of These Things Is Not Like the Other, in the following year. Two of Six Mile High's singles, "Homebaker" and "Hallowed Ground", were engineered by Chris Dickie, who earned a nomination for Engineer of the Year at the ARIA Music Awards of 1996 for these and "Restoration" by Header. The group disbanded in 1998.

== Members ==
- Travis Calley (keyboards, programming, saxophone)
- Kiriakos Lucas (guitar)
- Andrei Mazandarani (vocals, programming)
- Anton Mazandarani (drums, percussion)
- Jerome Mazandarani (bass)
- Julian Ralls (guitar)

== Discography as Six Mile High ==
List of singles as Six Mile High, with selected chart positions
Title	Details	Peak chart positions
Title	Details	AUS
Homebaker	Released: November 1995 Label: Columbia (662471 2)	84
Hallowed Ground	Released: May 1996 Label: Columbia (662985 2)	—

== Discography as Yummy Fur ==
=== Albums ===
Title	Details
One Of These Things Is Not Like The Other	Released: July 1997 Label: Offworld Sounds (OFFCD1)

=== Extended Plays ===
Title	Details
Fur'ther	Released: November 1993 Label: Salmonberry Records (SAL S001)
Initiations	Released: September 1994 Label: Salmonberry Records (SAL CD002)

=== Singles ===
Title	Details	Album
Life	Released: April 1997 Label: Offworld Sounds (OFF2 - SPD)	One Of These Things Is Not Like The Other
New Sun / Daredevil	Released: August 1997 Label: Offworld Sounds (off3 - spd)	One Of These Things Is Not Like The Other
