= Apple Eyes =

1995 single by Swoop

Single by Swoop

from the album The Woxo Principle
- Released: 30 October 1995
- Length: 3:23
- Label: Mushroom
- Songwriters: Joshua Beagley, Roland Kapferer, Alexander Hewettson, Fiona Ta'akimoeaka
- Producers: Joshua Beagley, Roland Kapferer

Swoop singles chronology
"Rock Dog" (1995)	"Apple Eyes" (1995)	"(It Could Happen) Any Day Now" (1996)

"Apple Eyes" is a song by Australian band Swoop that was released in October 1995 as the third single from the group's second studio album, The Woxo Principle (1995). It was their most successful single, peaking at number nine on the Australian ARIA Singles Chart. The single was certified gold by Australian Recording Industry Association (ARIA) for shipments exceeding 35,000 copies. At the ARIA Music Awards of 1996, the song was nominated for Song of the Year and Best Video.

== Background ==
Australian funk music group Swoop released their second studio album The Woxo Principle in November 1995, which was preceded by its third single, "Apple Eyes" in October. The band had signed with Mushroom Records in the previous year, which issued two earlier singles, "Neighbourhood Freak" (November) and "Rock Dog" (August 1995. The line-up for the album and associated singles was Joshua Beagley on electric and acoustic guitars, Chris Brien on drums, bells, tambourine and voices, Armando Gomez on wood block, Alex Hewetson on bass guitar, Roland Kapferer on lead vocals, Brendan St Ledger on piano, electric pianos, organ, clavinet, synthesisers, xylophone, mellotron and talk box and Fiona Ta'akimoeaka on lead vocals.

"Apple Eyes" was co-written by Beagley, Kapferer, Hewetson and Ta'akimoeaka. Co-producers of the track are Beagley, Kapferer, Ashley Cadell and Robbie Rowlands. It is the highest charting single by Swoop, which peaked at No. 9 on the ARIA Singles Chart in January 1996.

== Music video ==
The music video for "Apple Eyes" depicts the band playing on a black and white checkerboard hovering above an ocean in a surreal CGI landscape.

== Track listing ==
Australian CD single (D 1217)
No.	Title	Length
1.	"Apple Eyes"	3:23
2.	"Take It or Leave It"	4:23
3.	"Am I Blind"	4:57
4.	"Apple Eyes" (GT's Special mix for Josh)	5:54
5.	"Apple Eyes" (GT's New Kind of Rhythm mix)	6:35
6.	"Rock Dog" (radio edit)	4:15

== Charts ==
=== Weekly charts ===
Chart (1996)	Peak position
Australia (ARIA)	9

=== Year-end charts ===
Chart (1996)	Position
Australia (ARIA)	69

== Certifications ==
Region	Certification	Certified units/sales
Australia (ARIA)	Gold	35,000^{^}
^{^} Shipments figures based on certification alone.
