= That's the Thing About Football =

Single by Greg Champion

from the album That's What I Like About Football
- Released: 15 August 1994
- Length: 2:40
- Label: Massive
- Songwriter(s): Greg Champion; Mike Brady; Paul Kelly

Music video
- "That's the Thing About Football" on YouTube

"That's the Thing about Football" is a song written and performed by Australian artist Greg Champion, featured for almost a decade on Seven Network's coverage of the Australian Football League.

Champion shares songwriting credit on the song with Mike Brady and Paul Kelly.

Released in August 1994, the song reached a peak of number 31 on the Australian ARIA Charts and is widely regarded as a classic in mainstream Australian sporting culture.

The song was performed by Champion at both the 1995 AFL Grand Final and 2002 AFL Grand Final.

== Charts ==
Chart performance for "That's the Thing About Football"
| Chart (1994) | Peak position |
|---|---|
| Australia (ARIA) | 31 |
