= Imagination (Deni Hines album) =

Studio album by Deni Hines
- Released: 20 May 1996
- Recorded: Red Bus Studios, 1995-1996
- Genre: Pop
- Labels: Mushroom Records; Warner Bros. Records
- Producers: Ian Green, Martyn Ware

Deni Hines chronology
Imagination (1996)	Remix Your Imagination (1997)

Singles from Imagination
- 1. "It’s Alright" Released: 23 October 1995; 2. "Imagination" Released: February 1996; 3. "I Like the Way" Released: 17 June 1996; 4. "I'm Not in Love" Released: 1996; 5. "Joy" Released: 19 May 1998

Alternative cover
- 1997 edition

Imagination is the debut studio album by Australian singer songwriter, Deni Hines.

At the ARIA Music Awards of 1996, Imagination was nominated for two awards - Best Female Artist losing to "Come On" by Christine Anu and Breakthrough Artist – Album losing to Tu-Plang by Regurgitator.

The album was released in Europe in 1998 under the title Pay Attention.

== Track listings ==
1996 track listing

No.	Title	Writer(s)	Length
1.	"I Like the Way"	Deni Hines, Ian Green
2.	"It's Alright"	Ian Green, Michelle Lewis
3.	"It's Not Over"	B. Jones, J. Kenny, J. Jones, R. Smith, R. Medhurst
4.	"Like A River"	Ian Green
5.	"Yes We Can"	Allen Toussaint
6.	"Joy"	Deni Hines, Ian Green
7.	"Imagination"	Alex Richbourg, Andre Robinson, Rachel Oden
8.	"Go Slow"	Deni Hines, Ian Green
9.	"When a Woman Pretends"	Adrian Lee, Chris Neil
10.	"Personal"	Al B. Sure!
11.	"I'm Not in Love"	Eric Stewart, Graham Gouldman

1997 re-release

1. "It's Alright" - 4:16
2. "Make It Happen" - 5:10
3. "I Like The Way" - 4:34
4. "Do You Feel The Way I Do" - 4:13
5. "It's Not Over" - 4:21
6. "Like A River" - 4:28
7. "Delicious" - 6:03
8. "Too High" - 5:21
9. "Go Slow" - 5:30
10. "Joy" - 5:51
11. "Personal" - 4:47
12. "Somethin' About You" - 3:12
13. "Imagination" - 3:25
14. "I'm Not In Love" - 5:40

== Charts ==
Imagination debuted and peaked at number 15 in June 1996. The album remained in the top 50 for 10 weeks.

Chart	Peak position
Australian Albums (ARIA)	15
Japanese Albums (Oricon)	21

== Certifications ==
Region	Certification	Certified units/sales
Australia (ARIA)	Gold	35,000^{^}
Japan	—	300,000
^{^} Shipments figures based on certification alone.
