= Header (band) =

Australian power pop band

- Origin: Perth
- Years active: 1994-
- Members: Ian Freeman; Dave Chadwick; Brad Bolton; Liam Coffey; Dean Willoughby

Header is an Australian power pop band that formed in Perth in 1994.

Their single "Restoration" was engineered by Chris Dickie who earned a nomination for the 1996 ARIA Music Awards for Engineer of the Year for this and two other releases.

== Members ==
- Ian Freeman (vocals)
- Dave Chadwick (guitar)
- Brad Bolton (guitar)
- Liam Coffey (bass, vocals)
- Dean Willoughby (drums)

== Discography ==
=== Albums ===
List of albums, with selected details
Title	Details
On High St	Released: 1996; Format: CD; Label: Bark

=== EPs ===
- Header (1995, Fish Bowl)
- Sugafix (1995, Bark)
- Crazy Head (1996, Bark)
- Brazen Head (1996, Bark)

=== Singles ===
List of singles, with selected chart positions
Title	Year	Peak chart positions	Album
Title	Year	AUS	Album
"Not Proud"	1995	—	Sugafix
"Restoration"	1996	84	On High St

== Awards and nominations ==
=== ARIA Music Awards ===
The ARIA Music Awards is an annual awards ceremony that recognises excellence, innovation, and achievement across all genres of Australian music. They commenced in 1987.

Year	Nominee / work	Award	Result	Ref.
1996	Chris Dickie for "Restoration" by Header	ARIA Award for Engineer of the Year	Nominated	
