= Katia Tiutiunnik =

Australian musician

Katia Tiutiunnik (born 19 March 1967 in Sydney, Australia) is an Australian composer, scholar and violist. She is of Russian, Ukrainian and Irish descent.

== Education ==
Katia Tiutiunnik's high school education was completed at Our Lady of Mercy College, Parramatta and North Sydney Girls High School. She earned her Bachelor of Music degree from the Sydney Conservatorium of Music, the University of Sydney, where she won the John Antill Composition Scholarship, the Don Banks Memorial Scholarship, and the Alfred Hill Prize upon graduation. She gained her PhD from the Australian National University, where she also completed advanced studies in Arabic. She also earned the highest Italian postgraduate title available in composition, the Diploma di Studi Superiori di Perfezionamento, from the Accademia Nazionale di Santa Cecilia, Rome, where she studied with Franco Donatoni for two years.

== Musical work ==
Tiutiunnik has guest lectured internationally and has received a number of awards, commissions, national and international travel grants and other sponsorship, from both the government and private sectors. She was an Honorary Research Associate at the Sydney Conservatorium of Music from 2010 to 2016 and was a Senior Lecturer at the Faculty of Music, Universiti Teknologi MARA, in Shah Alam, Selangor, Malaysia, from March 2012 until April 2016. In August 2016 Tiutiunnik was appointed as Professor of Music at SIAS International University in Xinzheng, Henan Province, People's Republic of China.

Tiutiunnik played the viola with the Sydney Youth Orchestra from 1990 to 1993. She has also performed and recorded a number of her own works, as well as the works of other composers She was the first Australian composer to be appointed visiting scholar at Columbia University, New York City, where she gave a presentation on symbolic references to Islamic mysticism and Middle Eastern affairs, in her music. She was also a visiting fellow at the Australian National University, artist-in-residence and guest composer at Canberra Girls' Grammar School and Canberra Grammar School and composer-in-residence at the celebrated electronic studio, Charles Morrow Productions, New York City. During her sojourn in New York City, Tiutiunnik was a resident and an alumna of International House of New York.

Tiutiunnik's compositions have been published in Australia, Italy and the United States and are held in several international libraries, including the Bodleian Library at Oxford University (which also holds a copy of her doctoral thesis, The Symbolic Dimension: An Exploration of the Compositional Process), Harvard College Library, the National Library of Australia and the Wiener Music Library at Columbia University. On 11 December 2009, a revised version of Tiutiunnik's doctoral dissertation was published as a book and released internationally. Tiutiunnik's published dissertation received an extensive, scholarly review by Australian musicologist, Dr. Sally Macarthur, in the prestigious, peer reviewed journal, Musicology Australia, in July 2011.

The symbolic dimensions of a number of Tiutiunnik's compositions have been associated with the motif of the journey through darkness to illumination. Also, several of Tiutiunnik's works have been inspired by Islamic mysticism and related traditions—the musical symbols therein often manifesting themselves in the form of compositional processes emanating from her interpretations of Near Eastern traditions of numerology. Other important influences on the symbolic dimensions of Tiutiunnik's compositions include the landscapes, flora and fauna of Australia; historical and current events pertaining to the Middle East, in addition to the religion and mythology of Ancient Mesopotamia.

== Performance ==
Tiutiunnik's works have been performed and broadcast in Australia, Brazil, Bulgaria, Canada, China, Germany, Greece, Italy, Jordan, Malaysia, Mexico, the Netherlands, Norway, Panama, Poland, Russia, San Marino, Serbia, Singapore, Thailand, the United Kingdom and the United States.

Festivals and conferences which have featured Tiutiunnik's compositions include the Fairbanks Summer Arts Festival, Alaska; Festivale Internazionale di Musica Contemporanea, Nuove Sincronie, Milan; Suoni e Voci del Lago, Lake Garda, Italy; Sydney Spring Festival; the 28th General Assembly of the International Music Council, Petra, Jordan, 1999 (which featured the world premiere of her symphonic poem, Noor, dedicated to Queen Noor of Jordan); Musica Nova, Sofia, Bulgaria (International Society of Contemporary Music, Bulgarian Section); Festivale Internazionale della Chitarra: Nicolo' Paganini, Parma, Italy; Compositrici: nuove strategie per una migliore valorizzazione, Teramo, Italy (Fondazione Adkins Chiti), 2001; the International Congress for Women in Music, Beijing, 2008; Cinque Giornate per La Nuova Musica e La Musica Sperimentale, Milan; Soundstream Festival, Adelaide, South Australia and others.

On 19 March 2007 (Tiutiunnik's fortieth birthday), a concert of her solo and chamber works was held at the Dom Kompozitorov, Saint Petersburg, Russia, as part of festivities celebrating two hundred years of business relations between Australia and Russia. This third concert of Tiutiunnik's compositions in St Petersburg featured eminent performers such as the Rimsky-Korsakov Quartet of Saint Petersburg and pianist Anna Sbagina. On the same day, Tiutiunnik gave a lecture/recital for the composition students of Boris Tishchenko, at the Saint Petersburg Conservatory and was also interviewed by Radio Maria, Saint Petersburg. The event was organized by Dr. Elena Kostyuchenko (who also organized her 2001 and 2006 St Petersburg concerts) and its sponsors included the Embassy of Australia in Moscow, Lis Faenza of Batemans Bay (who personally funded all of Tiutiunnik's international travel for the event) and Sebastian Fitzlyon-Zinovieff, Honorary Australian Consul in Saint Petersburg.

Presentations on the role of Tiutiunnik's work in global conflict resolution have been given by Dr. James Michael Bicigo of Borealis Brass of the University of Alaska Fairbanks (whose performances of Tiutiunnik's works have been broadcast internationally) at Bard College, Union Theological Seminary, in New York and at the University of Hawaii. Tiutiunnik's music has also been used for theatrical productions at the Edinburgh Fringe Festival, as well as in London, Melbourne, New York and Sydney. Her compositions have also been showcased as part of the Daniel Pearl World Music Days of the Daniel Pearl Foundation.

In early December 2009, the "Borealis in Australis" tour featured over ten performances of Tiutiunnik's works (including two world premieres and an Australian premiere) by Borealis Brass of the University of Alaska Fairbanks. These performances were in Batemans Bay, at Sydney's St. Andrew's Cathedral and on the Sunshine Coast. Highlights of this tour included a lecture/recital on the role of music in global conflict resolution—featuring Tiutiunnik's music and the music of other women composers from around the world—at the Batemans Bay campus of the University of Wollongong and a workshop for highschool students from the Eurobodalla Shire. Another important event in this tour was the VIP reception featuring live Koori music (supervised by local Koori elder, Loretta Parsley), the world premiere of Tiutiunnik's trumpet duo L'Imperatore Amato (dedicated to International House of New York) and speeches by various dignitaries, in Catalina, New South Wales. Two of Tiutiunnik's compositions, featured in the "Borealis in Australis" tour, received repeat performances at the University of Alaska Fairbanks New Music Festival, on 5 February 2010.

In April 2010 Tiutiunnik guest lectured and attended an Australian premiere of her music at the University of Melbourne.

Tiutiunnik's setting of the poem To the Enemy, by Eva Salzman, for soprano and percussion ensemble, received its world premier performance on 26 August 2010, at the opening, "Visionaries" concert of the Soundstream Festival, Adelaide, South Australia. This world premiere was broadcast live by ABC Classic FM.

Since 2012, Tiutiunnik's music has continued to be broadcast internationally and performed by numerous international artists, including Monica Moroni, Chiara Dolcini, Iwona Glinka, Bridges Collective, Elizabeth Reid, Roberto Fabbriciani, Vilma Campitelli, Beatrice Petrocchi, Arcko Symphonic Ensemble, Sideband, Luis Casal, Emille Blondel, Borealis Brass of the University of Alaska Fairbanks, Pemi Paull, Merietta Oviatt, Alice Bennett, Laila Engle, Peter Sheridan, Arya BastaninEzhad, Jane Bishop, Brad Gill, John Sharpley, Akiko Otao, Kalin Yong, Roger Vigulf, Laura Chislett, Stephanie McCallum, Nathan Meaney, Aleksandra Demowska-Madejska, Diana Weston, Jo Arnott, Eliza Shephard, Ross James Carey and others. Tiutiunnik also performed as a violist for over three years with the Sias University Symphony Orchestra, Xinzheng, Henan Province, China, at LASALLE College Singapore; Kuala Lumpur Performing Arts Centre, Universiti Pendidikan Sultan Idris, the Russian Centre for Science and Culture, Kuala Lumpur and elsewhere. As an erhu player, Tiutiunnik performed for three years with the SIAS University Chinese Traditional Orchestra and has also given solo recitals on the erhu at the Russian Centre for Science and Culture, Kuala Lumpur; China-ASEAN Music Festival, Nanning, Guangxi Province, China; Sias University, Xinzheng, Henan Province, China; Zhengzhou, Henan Province, China and elsewhere. On March 4, 2020, Katia Tiutiunnik's flute and piano duo, The Quickening, performed by noted Australian flautist, Laura Chislett, and renowned Australian pianist, Stephanie McCallum, was released on the Australian Broadcasting Corporation, ABC Classics album, Women of Note: A Century of Australian Composers Volume 2.

== Personal life ==
From 2008 to early 2012, Tiutiunnik resided with her two sons in the Eurobodalla Shire of the South Coast of New South Wales, Australia. From March 2012 to September 2016, Tiutiunnik lived in Shah Alam in Selangor, Malaysia. From September 2016 to November 2019, Tiutiunnik resided in Xinzheng, Henan Province, People's Republic of China.

== Selected works ==
Orchestral and concertante

- Nights in Arabia for viola and orchestra (1992, revised 1998)
- Noor for violin and orchestra (1998)
- An Orientalist in Palestine for orchestra (2000)
- Wonders of Babylon for trombone, wind orchestra and percussion (2001)
- Mikhail for cello and orchestra (2005)
- Redemption: Four reflections for viola and string orchestra (2016)
- 玫瑰 Méiguī : Roses for Chinese Traditional Orchestra (2017)
- 鲜花节 Xiānhuā jié : Festival of Flowers: Symphonic Jewels of the East No.I (2018)

Chamber and instrumental

- Al'amut for piccolo, bass clarinet, harp and tubular bells (1993)
- Arcano for oboe, clarinet, violin and harp (1993)
- Sinan for oboe solo (1993)
- Adone for flute, oboe clarinet, bassoon, violin, viola, cello, piano and percussion (1994)
- Arà for flute, oboe, clarinet, bassoon, horn, violin, viola, cello, piano and percussion (1995)
- Hidayah for piccolo solo (1995)
- Erato for clarinet solo (1995)
- Apoteosi for piccolo, flute and alto flute (one player) (1995)
- Mahdoom for trombone solo (1998)
- Al-Kauthar for cello solo (1999)
- Danza delle fate arabe for guitar solo (1999)
- Lament of the Flutes for Dumuzi for flute and piano (1999)
- Night Journey for string quartet (2000)
- Al-Hisar for trombone, or viola, or cello solo (2001)
- Canto di Enheduanna for flute, cello and piano (2001)
- Tre Preghiere di Nabuccoduriussor for guitar solo (2001)
- Prayer for viola solo (2002)
- Rinascita for flute, trombone, mezzo-soprano, percussion and violin (2002)
- Via Trionfale: Verso Il Loto Benedetto for horn, trumpet and trombone (2002)
- Cities of the Gods, Cycle of 5 Works for cello solo (2004)

1. "Portal to Nibiru"
2. "Lament to Inanna"
3. "O Fair Daughter of Man!"
4. "Sacred Marriage in TILMUN"
5. "Ali Dorati dei Nefilim (Golden Wings of the Nefilim)"

- L'Imperatore Amato for 2 trumpets (2004)
- The Quickening: A Tribute to Jonathan Kramer for flute and piano (2005)
- Who Is Like God?, Cycle of 4 Works for cello solo (2006)

1. "Exiled in Babylon"
2. "Embracing Dumuzi"
3. "Temple of the Sun"
4. "White Night"

- White Night for viola solo (2006)
- White Nights of Dreams for viola, tubular bells and tam-tam (2007)
- La Passion de Jehanne for trombone and violin (2009)
- Out of the Depths for brass quintet (2009)
- Invocazione a Dumuzi for piano and violin (2011)
- L'Embargo for viola and percussion ensemble (2011)
- La Notte Bianca for violin (2011)
- Inno a Dumuzi for countertenor and piano (2012)
- Abbracciando Dumuzi for violoncello, vibraphone and togunggak ensemble (2012)
- Malam Putih for 2 violas and togunggak ensemble (2012)
- Elegia: Una Notte Bianca for trombone solo (2012)
- Al-Falaq for trumpet, trombone, togunggak ensemble, 2 gendang and gong aggung (2013)
- Ballando con la Vita for trombone and violin (2013)
- Le Vie del Vento Divino for flute/ney, 2 bass flutes, contrabass flute and percussion (2013)
- At-Taubah: A Meditation for 'Oud for 'oud solo (2013)
- A Requiem for bass flute and vibraphone (2014)
- Gioielli della Notte for contrabass flute solo (2014)
- Notti Bianche d'Amore for bass flute or contrabass flute and tubular bells (2014)
- Al-Laila: A Lamentation for 'Oud for 'oud solo (2014)
- Az-Zuhoor: An Elegy for 'Oud for 'oud solo (2014)
- Sacred Night for bass clarinet, violin and digital delay (2014)
- Una Notte Sacra for bass flute or contrabass flute solo (2015)
- Notti Sacre delle Nuvole Bianche for 2 flutes, alto flute, bass flute and tubular bells (2015)
- Daripada Kedalaman for piccolo, 4 flutes and bass flute (2015)
- Le Regine for violin, amplified gambus and gamelan ensemble (2015)
- Tarian Takdir for amplified gambus, togunggak ensemble, 2 gendang and gong aggung (2015)
- Ukiran Malam for viola, violoncello, tubular bells and digital delay (2015)
- Festival des Roses for trumpet, trombone and gamelan ensemble (2015)
- Roses : Reflections for flute, bass flute, tubular bells/vibraphone and tam-tam (2017)
- 神圣的夜晚 Shénshèng de yèwǎn : A meditation for bass flute, viola, tubular bells/vibraphone and tam-tam (2017)
- Les Nuits Blanches des Rêves for oboe, tubular bells and tam-tam (2018)
- 拥抱重生 Yǒngbào chóngshēng for violin solo (2018)
- Dansant avec la vie for flute and bass flute or flute and contrabass flute (2018)
- 与生活共舞 Yǔ shēnghuó gòng wǔ for flute and violin (2018)
- 挽歌：神圣的白夜 Wǎngē: Shénshèng de Báiyè for alto saxophone solo (2018)
- Embrassant la Renaissance for oboe solo (2018)
- 拥抱重生 Yǒngbào chóngshēng : Embracing the Rebirth for erhu solo (2018)
- 禁运 Jìn yùn : The Embargo for oboe and percussion ensemble (2018)
- Le Notti Bianche dei Sogni : for flute, tubular bells and tam-tam for flute, tubular bells and tam-tam (2018)
- 祷告 Dǎogào : Prayer for gaohu solo (2018)
- 祷告 Dǎogào for erhu solo (2018)
- L'Abbraccio della Rinascita for bass flute and contrabass flute solo (2018)
- Dumuzi's Embrace for viola solo (2018)
- Una notte sacra for alto flute (2018)
- 玫瑰第三章节:白玫瑰献给死去的女王 Méiguī dì sān zhāngjié: Bái méiguī xiàn gěi sǐqù de nǚwáng for erhu and piano (2019)
- L'Abbraccio della Rinascita for flute and bass flute solo (2020)
- Una Notte Sacra per flauto in Do flute solo (2020)
- Iluminada: Três Reflexões sobre Fátima, for recorder and harpsichord (2022)

1. "Sombras dos Segredos" for tenor recorder and harpsichord
2. "Rainha Resplandecente" for descant recorder and harpsichord
3. "Dança Sagrada" for tenor recorder and harpsichord

Piano

- Bhairawa for piano solo (1995)
- Agressi Sunt Mare Tenebrarum Quid in Eo Esset Exploraturi for piano (1996)

Vocal

- Rinascita for mezzo-soprano, trombone, percussion, violin and violoncello (2002)
- Resurrection for massed choirs and two large percussion ensembles (2004)
- To the Enemy for soprano and percussion ensemble (2004); text by Eva Salzman
- Jehanne for soprano and viola (2007); text by Elisabetta Faenza
- De Profundis Clamavi for soprano solo and women's and/or children's choir (2009)

Electroacoustic

- Dumuzi, Priest and King for 3 Dimensional Sound Cube and viola, Charles Morrow Productions (2005)
- Voices in the Night for multi channelled cello and voices (2006); text: Lucy Aponte; cello: David Pereira; voices: Anthony Michael Tiutiunnik and Katia Tiutiunnik
