= Galahs in the Gidgee =

Studio album by Colin Buchanan
- Released: 1991
- Recorded: The Vault, East Balmain; 1990–1991
- Genre: Country rock, Country
- Length: 41:59
- Label: ABC Music
- Producer: John Kane

Colin Buchanan UK chronology
Galahs in the Gidgee (1991)	Hard Times (1992)

Galahs in the Gidgee is the first album released by Colin Buchanan in 1991. Produced by John Kane for the ABC Records label, the album is considered Buchanan's breakthrough album, earning him several Australian Country Music Award nominations and his first winning award for New Talent of the Year for the album.

All of the songs on the album relate to the Australian Outback, the people who live there and local customs. Inspiration came to Buchanan while he lived in Bourke in country New South Wales as quoted in the liner notes of the album.

I came across so many strong images living at Pera Bore, near Bourke. To some it's a scrubby wasteland, but the place has a rugged beauty that got under my skin and often left me wide-eyed and open-mouthed.

The album was dedicated to Bill Vincent.

== Album cover ==
The album cover features Buchanan in front of a stereotypical Australian country outback backdrop setting. It was photographed by Michael Saggus and designed by Deborah Parry.

== Track listing ==
All songs by Colin Buchanan.

1. "Galahs in the Gidgee" – 3:22
2. "Uncle Viv" – 3:44
3. "Frank the Scab" – 3:20
4. "Harvest" – 3:38
5. "She Waits" – 4:17
6. "The Debutantes' Ball" – 3:40
7. "Farm Cars" – 1:52
8. "Come What May" – 3:00
9. "Time For A Yarn" – 4:05
10. "Singlets Blue" – 3:30
11. "Progress" – 4:46

== Personnel ==
- Colin Buchanan: vocals, acoustic guitar, harmonica.
- John Kane: acoustic guitar, mandolin.
- Graham Thompson: bass.
- Hanuman Dass: drums, shelf, fire extinguisher.
- Michael Vidale: acoustic bass.
- Genni Kane: harmony vocals.
- Ian Simpson: harmony vocals, acoustic guitar, banjo.
- Colin Watson: electric guitar.
- Michel Rose: steel guitar, dobro.
- Michael Kerin: fiddle.
- Larry Muhoberac: accordion.
