= John Stanley (radio broadcaster) =

Australian radio broadcaster

John Stanley is an Australian radio broadcaster, who as of 2014 was the co-host with Paul B. Kidd of the breakfast show on Sydney radio station 2GB, a station he worked at since the 1990s.

In 2014, Stanley received the title of "Radio commentator of the year" at the Kennedy Awards for Excellence in NSW Journalism.
