= Christine Hutchinson (entertainer) =

Australian children's entertainer and magician

- Genres: Children's
- Occupations: Entertainer, magician
- Years active: 1980s-present
- Labels: ABC for Kids, EMI, BMG, Festival, PolyGram, Larrikin, Karussell

Christine Hutchinson is an Australian children's entertainer and magician. Her album Grand Fairies Ball was nominated for the ARIA Award for Best Children's Album in 1996 but lost to The Wiggles' Wake Up Jeff!, along with the accompanying song being nominated for the APRA Award for Most Performed Children's Work in the same year, but also lost to The Wiggles' accompanying song.

== Biography ==
Hutchinson is also a magician and performer and toured during the 1980s and 1990s both throughout Australia as well as overseas. Her touring shows included "Wait a Minim...There's Something Up My Sleeve", "Out of the Hat" and "Grand Fairies Ball" (all directed by Gilli Farrelly a.k.a. Gilly McInnes).

From 1993, Hutchinson was a part of the ABC for Kids stable of performers and wrote her two solo albums for ABC/EMI. Out Of The Hat (1993) was produced by Ian Blake, with songs by herself, Blake and Mike Jackson. Grand Fairies Ball (1996) was produced by Justin McCoy. Christine wrote a third solo album, Magical Menagerie: A Big Pond Full of Songs (2009), which she produced with Julian Gough and self-distributed on SoundCloud.

In 2000, Hutchinson started a law degree at La Trobe University in Melbourne. She practised at law firms Deacons and Norton Rose Australia. Between 2010 and 2014 she worked as a judge's associate at the County Court in Melbourne for Judge Jane Patrick.

== Personal life ==
She is married with two children.

== Discography ==
=== Solo albums ===
- Out of the Hat (1993) ABC Music/EMI (produced by Ian Blake)
- Grand Fairies Ball (1996) ABC Music/EMI (produced by Justin McCoy)
- Magical Menagerie: A Big Pond Full of Songs (2009) SoundCloud (produced by Julian Gough)

=== With other artists ===
- Snugglepot and Cuddlepie (their first adventure) (1994) ABC Music (co-performer Justin McCoy)
- Snugglepot and Cuddlepie (their second adventure) (1994) ABC Music (co-performer Justin McCoy)
- A Book For Kids Vol 1. (Clarence James Dennis) (1994) ABC Music (co-performers Ian Blake, Pat Drummond and Mike Jackson)
- A Book For Kids Vol 2. (Clarence James Dennis) (1994) ABC Music (co-performers Ian Blake, Pat Drummond and Mike Jackson)
- A Book For Kids Vol 3. (Clarence James Dennis) (1994) ABC Music (co-performers Ian Blake, Pat Drummond and Mike Jackson)
- Elves and Fairies of the Australian Bush (1995) Larrikin (co-performers Ian Blake and George Spartels)
- Snugglepot and Cuddlepie (their third adventure) (1995) Karussell/PolyGram (co-performer Justin McCoy)
- Snugglepot and Cuddlepie (their fourth adventure) (1995) Karussell/PolyGram (co-performer Justin McCoy)
- Snugglepot and Cuddlepie (their fifth adventure) (1996) Karussell/PolyGram (co-performer Justin McCoy)
- Snugglepot and Cuddlepie (their sixth adventure) (1996) Karussell/PolyGram (co-performer Justin McCoy)
- The Magic Pudding (the first slice) (1996) Karussell/PolyGram, Larrikin (co-performers Ian Blake and George Spartels)
- The Magic Pudding (the second slice) (1996) Karussell/PolyGram, Larrikin (co-performers Ian Blake and George Spartels)
- The Magic Pudding (the third slice) (1996) Karussell/PolyGram, Larrikin (co-performers Ian Blake and George Spartels)
- The Magic Pudding (the fourth slice) (1996) Karussell/PolyGram, Larrikin (co-performers Ian Blake and George Spartels)

== Videography ==
- Monica's House (1996) Network Entertainment (played the character of Mrs George Davino)
- Grand Fairies Ball (1996) ABC Music Promotional Clip (Directed by Ignatius Jones, Cinematography by David Collins. Featuring Monica Trapaga, Mic Conway, George Washingmachine and Julian Gough)

== Books ==
- Out of the Hat: songs, poems, activities, recipes, music and magic (1995) ABC Enterprises (illustrated by Bronwyn Halls)

== Awards and nominations ==
=== APRA Music Awards ===
Year	Nominated works	Award	Result
1996	"Grand Fairies Ball"	Most Performed Children's Work	Nominated

=== ARIA Music Awards ===
Year	Nominated works	Award	Result
1996	Grand Fairies Ball	Best Children's Album	Nominated
