= Thriller (Swoop album) =

Studio album by Swoop
- Released: August 1993
- Length: 56:08
- Label: Freakzone
- Producer: Joshua Beagley, Robert Woolf

Swoop chronology
Thriller (1993)	The Raw Funk Power (1994)

Singles from Thriller
- 1. "Everybody Loves the Sunshine" Released: 1993; 2. "Do It" Released: 1993

Thriller is the debut studio album by Australian funk band Swoop. The album was released in August 1993, peaking at number 160 on the ARIA charts in May 1994.

At the ARIA Music Awards of 1994, the album was nominated for Best New Talent, losing out to Get On Board by The Badloves.

== Track listing ==
No.	Title	Writer(s)	Length
1.	"Prelude"	W. B. Yeats	2:08
2.	"Funkify"	Joshua Beagley; Roland Kapferer; Robert Woolf	4:54
3.	"Do It"	Beagley; Kapferer; Fiona Ta'akimoeaka; Woolf	4:32
4.	"Everybody Loves the Sunshine"	Roy Ayers; Beagley; Kapferer; Woolf	4:45
5.	"Everything I Do from Now On Is Going to Be Funky"	Beagley; Kapferer; Woolf	3:54
6.	"I'm Gonna Blow Your Mind"	Thomas McClary; Walter Orange; Milan Williams	4:18
7.	"The Way You Groove Me"	Beagley; Kapferer	4:07
8.	"Catch Me" (Deeper Still mix)	Beagley; Kapferer; Ta'akimoeaka; Woolf	4:34
9.	"Listen To Your Heartbeat"	Beagley; Kapferer; Ta'akimoeaka; Woolf	6:48
10.	"Gotta Have Your Own Thing"	Beagley; Kapferer; Woolf	4:24
11.	"Tell Me if You Like It"	Beagley; Kapferer; Ta'akimoeaka; Woolf	3:23
12.	"Jelly Funk" (Swooppindulgent mix)	Beagley; Kapferer	7:24

== Charts ==
Weekly chart performance for Thriller
Chart (1993/1994)	Peak position
Australian Albums (ARIA)	160

== Release history ==
Region	Date	Format(s)	Label	Catalogue
Australia	August 1993	Compact Disc	Freakzone	Space004
