= Imagination (Deni Hines song) =

Single by Deni Hines

from the album Imagination
- Released: February 1996
- Genre: Electronic, house
- Length: 4:08
- Label: Festival Mushroom Records
- Songwriter: Rachel Oden
- Producer: Ian Green

Deni Hines singles chronology
"It's Alright" (1995)	"Imagination" (1996)	"I Like the Way" (1996)

"Imagination" is a song by Australian singer Deni Hines. The song was released in February 1996 as the second single from her debut studio album, Imagination (1996). The single peaked at number 37 in Australia.

== Track listing ==
Australian Maxi single (D1285)

1. "Imagination" (Original Version) - 4:08
2. "Imagination" (D-Influence Mix 1) - 4:31
3. "Imagination" (D-Influence Instrumental) - 4:32
4. "Imagination" (D-Influence Dope Version) - 4:32

== Charts ==
Chart (1996)	Peak position
Australia (ARIA)	37

== Credits ==
- Backing vocals – Chris Braide, Deni Hines
- Brass – Nigel Hitchcock, Steve Sidwell
- Drums, bass, keyboards [Fender Rhodes], guitar [Flamenco], programmed by – Ian Green
- Engineer – Tim Russell
