= The Woxo Principle =

Studio album by Swoop
- Released: November 1995
- Studio: 48 Volt, Festival Studios, Studios 301
- Label: Mushroom Records
- Producer: Joshua Beagley, Robert Woolf

Swoop chronology
The Raw Funk Power (1994)	The Woxo Principle (1995)	Freak Fun (1998)

Singles from The Woxo Principle
- 1. "Neighbourhood Freak" Released: November 1994; 2. "Rock Dog" Released: August 1995; 3. "Apple Eyes" Released: 30 October 1995; 4. "(It Could Happen) Any Day Now" Released: March 1996; 5. "Do That to Me (One More Time)" Released: October 1996

The Woxo Principle is the second studio album by Australian funk band Swoop. The album was released in November 1995 and peaked at number 51 on the ARIA Charts.

Band member Roland Kapferer said "We don't turn our nose up at any style of music... The strength of our record is that it doesn't sound like anything else you'll hear at the moment".

At the ARIA Music Awards of 1996, the album was nominated for Best Pop Release, losing out to "Where the Wild Roses Grow" by Nick Cave & Kylie Minogue.

== Reception ==
Simon Wooldridge from Juice Magazine said "Swoop have contrived a cheesy amalgam of funk/rock/disco/pop on The Woxo Principle, and they've put it together with enough skill to make overlooking the amount of second hand riffage totally painless."

== Track listing ==
No.	Title	Writer(s)	Length
1.	"Woxo Prelude"	Joshua Beagley; Roland Kapferer	0:41
2.	"Living How I'm Living"	Beagley; Kapferer; Brendan St Ledger	3:12
3.	"Ephemera (Drop the Vibe)"	Beagley; Kapferer; Fiona Ta'akimoeaka; W. B. Yeats	3:20
4.	"Rock Dog"	Beagley; Kapferer; St Ledger	5:50
5.	"Apple Eyes"	Beagley; Alexander Hewetson; Kapferer; Ta'akimoeaka	3:26
6.	"The Woxo Principle (Gammaphasabiosonicpsychobombalistaphonic)"	Beagley; Kapferer; St Ledger	6:09
7.	"Interlude: Laughing Shock"		0:32
8.	"Shaka Uwaye La"	Beagley; Kapferer; Ta'akimoeaka	3:56
9.	"Matter of Time (Parts 1 & 2)"	Beagley; Hewetson; Kapferer; St Ledger; Ta'akimoeaka	7:20
10.	"(It Could Happen) Any Day Now"	Beagley; Kapferer	4:22
11.	"How Much Do You Want My Love"	Beagley; Armando Gomez; Kapferer; Ta'akimoeaka	1:56
12.	"Do That To Me (One More Time)"	Toni Tennille	3:32
13.	"93 Million Miles Away"	Beagley; Hewetson; Kapferer	5:18
14.	"Neighbourhood Freak"	Beagley; Hewetson; Kapferer	3:53
15.	"Shalla Bal (Ballad(e) Of The Silver Surfer)"	Beagley; Kapferer; Ta'akimoeaka	3:35
16.	"Interlude: The Breadman Suite"		1:20
17.	"Atomic Slam"	Beagley; Hewetson; Kapferer; Ta'akimoeaka	17:13

== Charts ==
Chart performance for The Woxo Principle
Chart (1995–1996)	Peak position
Australian Albums (ARIA)	51

== Release history ==
Region	Date	Format(s)	Label	Catalogue
Australia	November 1995	Compact Disc	Mushroom Records	D31445
