= Colin Buchanan (musician) =

Australian musician (born 1964)

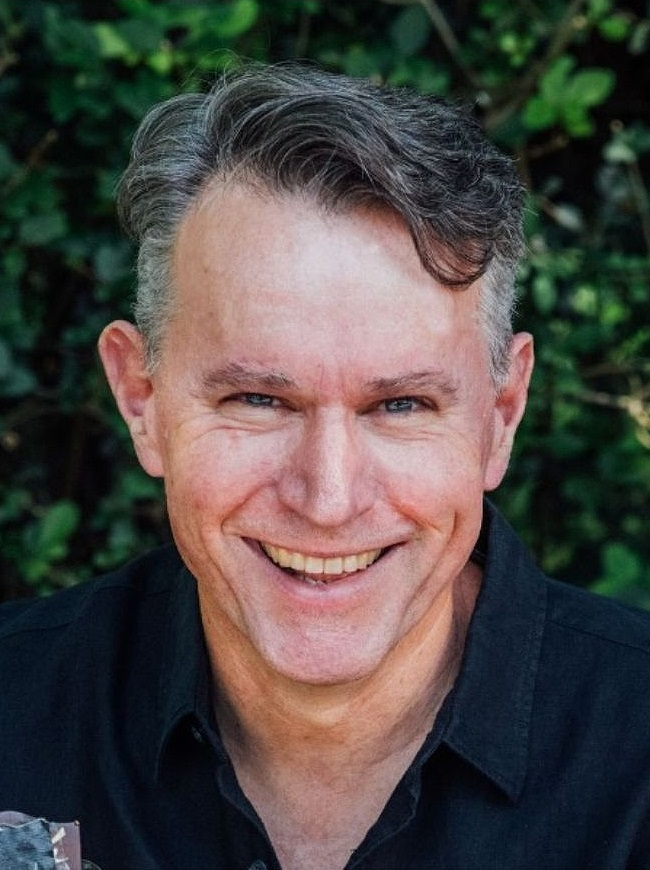
- Buchanan at the 2023 Tamworth Country Music Festival

Background information
- Born: 23 May 1964 (age 62); Dublin, County Dublin, Ireland
- Origin: Bourke, New South Wales, Australia
- Genres: Country, children's, Christian
- Occupation: Singer
- Instruments: Vocals, acoustic guitar, harmonica
- Years active: 1991–present
- Labels: ABC Music; EMI Music Australia; Universal Music Australia
- Website: www.colinbuchanan.com.au

Colin Buchanan (born 23 May 1964) is an Australian singer, songwriter, entertainer and multi-instrumentalist.

== Early life ==
Colin moved with his family to Melbourne, Australia, as a six-year-old, and then Peakhurst, Sydney, before moving to the outback in 1988 with his wife for a couple of years, studying with Cornerstone Community. This included a year in Bourke, in the corner country of New South Wales, and another in Grenfell, New South Wales.

== Career ==
Colin has won ten Golden Guitar Australian Country Music Awards and has written songs with Lee Kernaghan, Adam Brand and Troy Cassar-Daley. His song "Hat Town", written with Lee Kernaghan, won an APRA Award, while his Christmas album, recorded with Greg Champion, has become an Australian classic, in particular his "Aussie Jingle Bells", now a staple at school end-of-year concerts. He was nominated for four ARIA Awards in 1993 for Best Country Album for Hard Times (lost to Lee Kernaghan for The Outback Club), in 1994 for Best Children's Album for I Want My Mummy (lost to Mic Conway for Whoopee), in 1998 for Best Country Album for Edge of the Kimberley (lost to Shanley Del for My Own Sweet Time) and in 2013 for Best Comedy Release for The TGIF Songs of Colin Buchanan (lost to Tom & Alex for The Bits We're Least Ashamed of).

Colin was a regular presenter on ABC TV's Play School from 1992 to 1999, when the program was revamped. More recently he appeared on Playhouse Disney, a co-production between Australia's Seven Network and Disney Channel. He appeared with Monica Trapaga each year representing Seven and Disney on Carols in the Domain. For 20 years he hosted Qantas' in-flight audio entertainment, predominantly "Big Country", pioneering the guest co-host format eventually adopted across all Qantas in-flight audio channels.

Since the mid-1990s, Colin has devoted much of his time to producing Christian albums. In particular, his children's albums are popular across Australia, United Kingdom and in parts of the United States. Colin is often named as the most prominent Christian Kids songwriter. A former school teacher at several schools, his songs can be heard playing in many a primary classroom and Sunday School.

== Personal life ==
Colin and his wife Robyn have four children; Elliot, Laura, Emily and Riley.

== Discography ==
=== Studio albums ===
Year	Album details	Peak chart positions	Certifications (sales thresholds)
Year	Album details	AUS	Certifications (sales thresholds)
Galahs in the Gidgee	Released: 1991; Label: Australian Broadcasting Corporation	-	
Hard Times	Released: 1992; Label: Australian Broadcasting Corporation	-	
The Measure of a Man	Released: 1994; Label: Australian Broadcasting Corporation	-	
Aussie Christmas with Bucko & Champs (with Greg Champion – as Bucko & Champs)	Released: 1995; Label: Massive (7310782)	39	AUS: Gold
Edge of the Kimberley	Released: April 1998; Label: EastWest	98	
Aussie Christmas with Bucko & Champs 2 (with Greg Champion – as Bucko & Champs)	Released: 1998; Label: EastWest (3984254762)	67	AUS: Platinum
Real Hope	Released: 2000; Label: Wanaaring Road Music	-	
Land of the Getaway	Released: 2001; Label: Wanaaring Road Music	-	
God of Wonders	Released: 2003; Label: Wanaaring Road Music	-	
Take 2	Released: November 2003; Label: Wanaaring Road Music	89	
The Songwriter Sessions	Released: 2012; Label: Ambition Records	-	
Calvary Road	Released: 2017; Label: Three Seventeen Trust	-	
Memory Town	Released: August 2024; Label: Compass Brothers Records	-	

=== Compilation albums ===
- Bourke To Beaconsfield (2006)
- The TGIF Songs of Colin Buchanan (Double CD) (2013)

=== Religious Children's albums ===
- I Want My Mummy (1993)
- Remember the Lord (1996)
- Practise Being Godly (1997)
- Follow the Saviour (1998)
- Live in the Big Tent (2000)
- Special Edition Volume # 1 (compilation of demos) (2001)
- 10, 9, 8... God Is Great (2002)
- Baa Baa Doo Baa Baa (compilation) (2003)
- Jesus Rocks the World (2004)
- King of Christmas (Double CD) (2005)
- Nicky Nacky Nocky Noo (2006)
- Colin's Favourites (Compilation) (2007)
- Super Saviour (2008)
- Boom Chicka Boom (2009)
- God Rock (2011)
- Live in the Big Tent (Special Edition) (2010)
- King of the Jungle (2013)
- The Jesus Hokey Pokey (2014)
- Jingle Jingle Jesus (2015)
- Boss of the Cross (2016)
- Colin's Crackers Favourites Vol 2 (2016)
- Living on the Rock (2016)
- Colin's New Testament Big Bible Story Songs (2017)
- Jesus The Game Changer (2017)
- Fam Bam Bible Jam! (2018)
- Catechismo Kids (2019)
- Colin Buchanan's Old Testament Sing-A-Long (2020)

=== Charted and certified singles ===
List of charted and certified singles, with selected chart positions
Title	Year	Peak chart positions	Certification	Album
Title	Year	AUS	Certification	Album
"Aussie Jingle Bells"	1995	-	ARIA: Gold	Aussie Christmas with Bucko & Champs

== Awards and nominations ==
=== APRA Music Awards ===
Year	Nominated works	Award	Result	Ref
1994	"She's My Ute" with Lee Kernaghan and Garth Porter	Country Song of the Year	Nominated	
1994	"Mummy Song (a.k.a. I Want My Mummy)"	Children's Composition of the Year	Nominated	
1996	"Nine Mile Run" with Fiona and Tania Kernaghan	Most Performed Country Work	Nominated	
1996	"Skinny Dippin'" with Lee Kernaghan, Lawrence Minton and Garth Porter	Most Performed Country Work	Nominated	
1999	"Hat Town" with Lee Kernaghan and Garth Porter	Most Performed Country Work	Won	
2012	"Country Is" (Troy Cassar-Daley / Colin Buchanan)	Song of the Year	Shortlisted	
2013	"Country Is" (Troy Cassar-Daley / Colin Buchanan)	Most Performed Country Work	Nominated	

=== ARIA Music Awards ===
The ARIA Music Awards are a set of annual ceremonies presented by Australian Recording Industry Association (ARIA), which recognise excellence, innovation, and achievement across all genres of the music of Australia. They commenced in 1987.

Year	Nominated works	Award	Result	Ref
1993	Hard Times	Best Country Album	Nominated	
1994	I Want My Mummy	Best Children's Album	Nominated	
1996	Aussie Christmas (as Bucko and Champs)	Best Comedy Release	Nominated	
1998	Edge of the Kimberley	Best Country Album	Nominated	
2013	The TGIF Songs of Colin Buchanan	Best Comedy Release	Nominated	

=== Country Music Awards of Australia ===
The Country Music Awards of Australia (CMAA) (also known as the Golden Guitar Awards) is an annual awards night held in January during the Tamworth Country Music Festival, celebrating recording excellence in the Australian country music industry. They have been held annually since 1973. Buchanan has won seven awards and two as a songwriter.

Year	Nominee / work	Award	Result (wins only)
1992	Colin Buchanan – "Galahs in the Gidgee"	New Talent of the Year	Won
1993	"A Drover's Wife"	Heritage Award	Won
1998	"Edge of the Kimberley"	Heritage Song of the Year	Won
1999	"Tough Job" (with Lee Kernaghan)	Vocal Collaboration of the Year	Won
1999	"That Old Caravan"	Bush Ballad of the Year	Won
2000	"They Don't Make 'em Like That Anymore"	APRA Song of the Year	Won
2005	"Missin' Slim" (with Lee Kernaghan)	Heritage Song of the Year	Won
2007	"Close As a Whisper (The Gift)" (performed by Lee Kernaghan – written by Lee Kernaghan, Garth Porter & Colin Buchanan)	Heritage Song of the Year	Won
2010	"The Road to Thargomindah" (performed by The Bushwackers – written by Colin Buchanan)	Bush Ballad of the Year	Won
2025	"Laura & Giselle"	Bush Ballad of the Year	Won

=== Tamworth Songwriters Awards ===
The Tamworth Songwriters Association (TSA) is an annual songwriting contest for original country songs, awarded in January at the Tamworth Country Music Festival. They commenced in 1986. Colin Buchanan has won six awards.

Year	Nominee / work	Award	Result (wins only)
1990	"Up to Their Eyeballs" by Colin Buchanan	Amateur Traditional Award	Won
1991	"Debutantes Ball" by Colin Buchanan	Professional Traditional Award	Won
1994	"Dem Doggies Don't Care" by Colin Buchanan	Children's Song of the Year	Won
2003	"Jesus Is No Fairytale" by Colin Buchanan	Children's Song of the Year	Won
2006	"King of Christmas" by Colin Buchanan	Children's Song of the Year	Won
2015	Colin Buchanan	Songmaker Award	awarded
