= Chris Brien =

Australian musician

- Born: Christian John Brien; Sydney, New South Wales, Australia
- Genres: Rock, funk, disco
- Occupations: Drummer, drum clinician, teacher, writer
- Years active: 1988–present
- Website: chrisbrien.com

Christian John Brien is a drummer, percussionist and drum clinician. From 1992 he was a member of the Australian rock, funk and disco band Swoop and appears on all three of their studio albums, Thriller (October 1993), Woxo Principle (November 1995), and Be What You Is (January 1999).

Swoop's most popular single, "Apple Eyes", was released in 1995, which reached No. 9 on the ARIA Singles Chart. At the ARIA Music Awards of 1994, Swoop were nominated for 'Best New Talent' for Thriller, while at the 1996 awards they were nominated for 'Song of the Year' and 'Best Video' for "Apple Eyes", and for 'Best Pop Release' for Woxo Principle.

Late in 1999 Swoop disbanded, and Brien became a session musician and drum clinician and released solo material. He has also released a number of instructional DVDs including Independence (2002) and Independence, Part 2 (2004). In November 2006 he relocated to Hong Kong, where in 2010 he issued his instructional book, The Chris Brien Drumming System (Level One).

== Biography ==
Christian John Brien grew up in Sydney as the youngest of five children, both his father and grandfather are former drummers. He started playing drums in 1980, from 1986 he taught drum and percussion, and in 1988 he established his first drumming studio. In 1992 he joined a rock, funk and disco band, Swoop, which had formed as a duo, the previous year, with Roland P. Kapferer on lead vocals and Joshua Beagley on guitar and keyboards. He appears on all three of their studio albums, Thriller (October 1993), Woxo Principle (November 1995), and Be What You Is (January 1999). Their most popular single, "Apple Eyes", was released in 1995, which reached No. 9 on the ARIA Singles Chart. At the ARIA Music Awards of 1994 Swoop were nominated for 'Best New Talent' for Thriller; at the 1996 awards they were nominated for 'Song of the Year' and 'Best Video' for "Apple Eyes", and for 'Best Pop Release' for Woxo Principle. Late in 1999 Swoop disbanded.

After Swoop, Brien became a touring and studio session drummer. He also ran drum workshops around Australia and into other parts of the world. His style incorporates the sound of multiple drummers by use of "hand and foot techniques ... playing fast single stroke rolls with one hand or playing 7 or more rhythms simultaneously". A friend dubbed him the "Drumming Wizard of Oz". In October 2005 he issued his instructional book, Progressive Rhythms, which included access to his on-line video lessons. In November 2006 he relocated to Hong Kong and set up his drumming course there from April 2007 while still operating two drumming studios in Sydney. In late 2010 he issued a second instructional book, The Chris Brien Drumming System (Level One).

== Bibliography ==
- Brien, Chris (2002), Independence (DVD)
- Brien, Chris (2004), Independence Part 2, a Giant Step (DVD), Orion-Light Media
- Brien, Chris (October 2005). Progressive Rhythms.
- Brien, Christian John (2010). The Chris Brien Drumming System (Level One). Hong Kong: Brien Christian John. ISBN 978-988-19478-1-9.

== Equipment ==
2004–2006, kit

- SONOR Delight Series Drums (Piano Black), Ufip Cymbals and LP Percussion: Sonor Drums – Birdseye Azure or Brillant Black

- 14x5" Snare
- 12x5" Sonor Designer Snare
- 12x5" Sonor 3001 Snare (kicks with pedal)
- 10x4" Jungle Snare
- 8x8" Tom
- 10x10" Tom
- 12x14" Tom
- 17x22" Bass Drum
- 14" Sonor Jungle Bass Drum
- 14" Bionic Series Hi-hats
- 10" Bionic Series Hi-hats
- 10" Experience Splash (x2)
- 5" Ufip Cup Chime (x3)
- 8" Bionic Series Hi-hats
- 20" Bionic Series Ride
- 18" Bionic Series China
- 16" Bionic Series Crash
- 18" Bionic Series Crash
- L.P Bongo Small"
- L.P Bongo Large"
- L.P Quito (Classic)
- L.P Tumba (Classic)

- Chris mostly used SONOR Hardware and Pedals, but also had been seen using other brands.
- Chris used Attack drum heads and Silverfox Sticks.

2007–present, kit

Chris Brien has switched to Gretsch Drums, Zildjian Cymbals and Vic Firth Sticks.
