= The Soul Sessions (Deni Hines album) =

Studio album by Deni Hines
- Released: 18 November 2016
- Recorded: 2014
- Studio: Hercules Street Studio and Kings X Music
- Genre: Soul
- Label: Bitchin' Productions
- Producer: Insider Trading & Eddie Said

Deni Hines chronology
The Other Woman (2007)	The Soul Sessions (2016)	The Tokyo Sessions (2024)

Singles from The Soul Sessions
- 1. "What About Love " Released: 2 December 2016; 2. "I Got Your Back" Released: 7 April 2017; 3. "Been So Long" Released: 28 April 2017

The Soul Sessions is the fourth studio album by Australian singer Deni Hines. It was released on 18 November 2016 by Bitchin' Productions. The album was released in Japan by P-Vine.

The album includes several tracks co-written by Hines—"I Got Your Back", "Runnin'" and the lead single "What About Love".

== Background and Release ==
Throughout 2013 and 2014, Hines performed around Australia 'The Café Soul Sessions' tour and the idea for a soul-inspired album was born.

Hines decided to record the album concept, stating "I had a moment on stage recently where I stood back and watched them and thought 'Man, this band is hot!' and I wanted to capture in a recording how good they are when they play live." She added; "I hope you support the project because I'd really like to showcase these amazing musicians with songs that have been close to my heart since I was a child."

Hines also wanted to write original tracks for the album, inspired by the soul concept.

The Soul Sessions features cover art from celebrated artist Gabrielle Pool, who created the painting, which was sold at the Oasis Africa Charity Auction night to raise funds for the children of Kibera, Africa's largest slum. Hines and Pool flew to Kibera, with Hines teaching the children how to sing, while Pool taught them how to paint.

== Track listings ==
1. "Memphis Soul Stew" / "You Got the Love" (King Curtis/Chaka Khan, Ray Parker Jr) - 6:12
2. "Rock Steady" (Aretha Franklin) - 3:25
3. "What About Love" [Album Version] (Deni Hines, Edward Said) - 5:21
4. "P.Y.T. (Pretty Young Thing)" (James Ingram, Quincy Jones) - 3:44
5. "I Got Your Back" (Deni Hines, Clive Young, Damian Smith) - 4:28
6. "Been So Long" - 5:30
7. "Exhale" (Babyface) - 4:32
8. "A Long Walk" (Jill Scott, Andre Harris) - 5:02
9. "Runnin'" (Deni Hines, Darren Dowlut, Dennis Dowlut) - 3:59
10. "Piece of My Heart" (Jerry Ragovoy, Bert Berns) - 2:39
11. "Jesus Children of America" (Stevie Wonder) - 3:58
12. "If" (David Gates and Walien Bruner) - 2:54

== Personnel ==
- Vocals - Deni Hines
- Backing vocals: Miss Tery
- Keys & Hammond: Michael Rohanek
- Keys: Edward Said
- Bass: Ralph Marshall
- Drums: Aiden Haworth
- Guitar: Eric Rasmussen, Chris Kamzelas
- Synth: Ralph Marshall
- Engineered: Saul Muscardin, Edward Said
- Mixed by David Hemming, Edward Said
- Album Artwork: Gabrielle Poole
- Graphic Design: 4four Creative
- Produced by Insider Trading & Edward Said [What About Love & Runnin']
