= Deni Hines =

Australian singer (born 1970)

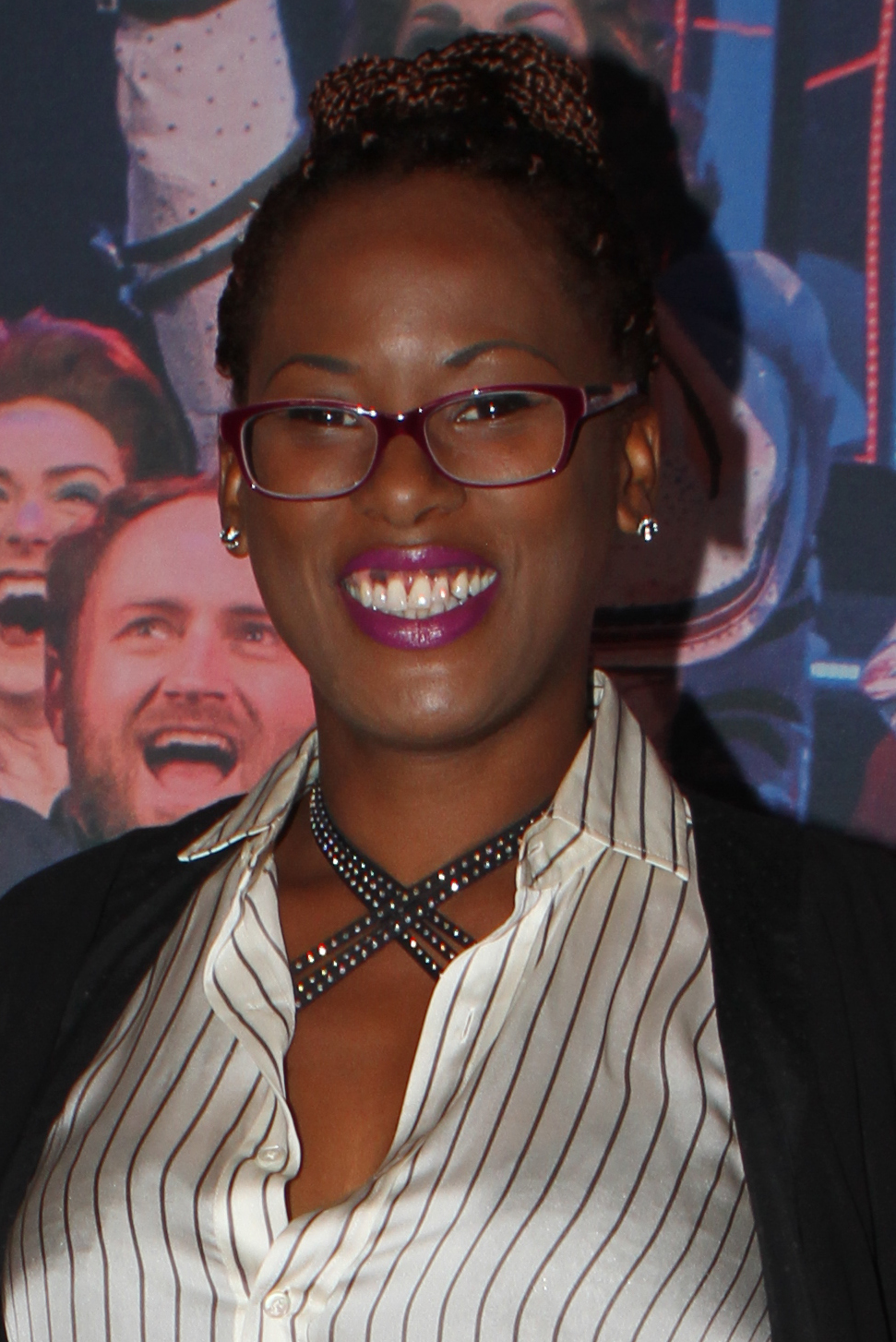
- Hines in 2017

Background information
- Born: Dohnyale Sharon Hines; 4 September 1970 (age 55); Sydney, New South Wales, Australia
- Genres: Soul, dance, pop
- Occupation: Singer
- Years active: 1985–present
- Labels: Mushroom, 3DE Records

Dohnyale Sharon "Deni" Hines (born 4 September 1970) is an Australian singer who has been releasing music since the early 1980s, with chart success in Australia, New Zealand, Japan and Europe. She is the daughter of American-born Australian singer Marcia Hines.

Hines released her first single with the Australian band Rockmelons with a cover version of the Bill Withers 1971 hit "Ain't No Sunshine". She then went on to release solo material, including the top-five single "It's Alright" and the top-20 album Imagination (1996), which sold more than 55,000 copies worldwide. A remix album, which included brand-new tracks, became Remix Your Imagination. Her third studio album was titled Water for Chocolate, which was released on 19 August 2006 and features the singles "Water for Chocolate", "Son of a Preacher Man" and "5 Days of Rain".

In 2007, Hines recorded a successful jazz album with Australian jazz artist James Morrison. The pair toured Australia to sold-out shows. In 2012, she played singer Neri Rogers in "The Green Mill Murder", S1:E3 of Miss Fisher's Murder Mysteries. On 18 November 2016, her fourth studio album, The Soul Sessions, was released, with the lead single "What About Love" co-written by Hines and Edward Said.

She has also appeared on multiple reality shows such as Celebrity Apprentice, Masked Singer, Dancing with the stars and Im A Celebrity Get Me Out Of Here.

== Music career ==
=== 1985–1993: Career launch, The Rockmelons and Jesus Christ Superstar ===
Hines was born in Sydney, New South Wales, and was inspired by her mother's success as a singer to follow a career in show business. She was discovered by a friend when she was singing to the radio and then was encouraged to pursue singing as a career. Her earliest employment was as a backing vocalist for such artists as Kylie Minogue (her Rhythm of Love Tour, Australia and Far East 1991), Jimmy Barnes, Wa Wa Nee and Peter Blakeley before she was approached by the band Rockmelons to provide vocals for several of their songs. The first song that Hines released with the Rockmelons collaboration was a cover version of the Bill Withers 1970s hit "Ain't No Sunshine" in 1991. The song proved to be a success, charting at number five on the Australian ARIA Singles Chart. With the success of the first single, the reggae-inspired "That Word (L.O.V.E.)" was the second song released with the collaboration and became another top-five single, charting at number four in Australia. The third and final song Hines released with the band was the ballad "It's Not Over". The song was also a success but was not as big as the previous two, charting at number 15 in Australia. With the success with the Rockmelons, Hines became one of the most well-known faces, and voices, in Australia.

In 1992, entrepreneur Harry M. Miller signed Hines for the role of Mary Magdalene in a revival of the stage musical Jesus Christ Superstar. Miller had discovered and signed her mother Marcia twenty years earlier, and the role of Mary Magdalene had also been one of Marcia's early successes. Deni Hines was well received in the role but left the production the following year. In 1992, Hines recorded "Not Enough Time" with INXS, and it peaked at number 28 on the Billboard Hot 100; a year later, she married the band's guitarist and saxophonist Kirk Pengilly.

=== 1994–1999: Imagination/Pay Attention and Remix Your Imagination ===
After three hit singles with the Rockmelons, Hines was signed to Mushroom Records and released her first solo single, "It's Alright", in 1995. The song charted at number four on the Australian ARIA Singles Charts and won an ARIA Award for "Breakthrough Artist – Single". "Imagination" was released at the beginning of 1996 and peaked at number 37. With two songs released from the album, Hines released her debut album Imagination on 27 May 1996; it charted at number 15 on the Australia ARIA Albums Chart and was nominated for two ARIA Awards. "I Like the Way" and "I'm Not in Love" (a cover version of a 10cc song) were the album's third and fourth singles, but both failed to chart in to top 50 in Australia.

In order to promote her album internationally, Hines moved to the UK in 1997 and reissued her album under the title Pay Attention and toured with Lighthouse Family and Earth, Wind & Fire. "It's Alright" was released in the United Kingdom in 1997 and was received well, peaking at number 35 on the singles chart. The track also managed to peak at number 22 in France. Further hits such as "I Like the Way", "Joy" and "Delicious" followed. In 1998, Hines cracked the U.S. market on the dance charts with "Joy" and "I Like the Way" both peaking in the top 20 of the U.S. Billboard Hot Dance Music/Club Play charts. Hines released a remix album titled Remix Your Imagination. This album included the song "Dream Your Dream", which was successful in Japan.

=== 2000–2007: A Delicious Collection, Water for Chocolate and The Other Woman ===
In 2000, Hines did a cover version of the Grace Jones song "Pull Up to the Bumper" the soundtrack for 2000 Australian film The Wog Boy. A Soca version of that same song was performed some 18 years later in 2018 by a similarly named Hinds (Alison Hinds "Pull Up" – Barbados Crop Over 2018).

In 2002, Hines released a greatest hits album, A Delicious Collection, based on contractual commitments with her then record company, Festival Mushroom. In 2003, she spent time in France working with hip hop artist I:AM, writing and recording for his album in addition to co-writing a track, "Welcome", on which Beyoncé Knowles sang for I:AM's release.

In 2004 and 2005, Hines spent most of the time overseas with her then-fiancé Ben Steel. Hines was writing for a new album in the US with the likes of the Family Stand and Whole 9 and back in Australia with Jarrad Rogers, Vince Pizzinga and many others. In early 2006, Hines played the part of Reno (a composite character representing a number of Dusty Springfield's lesbian lovers) in the stage musical Dusty – The Original Pop Diva, that premiered in Melbourne before touring Australia until September 2006. Dusty: The Original Pop Diva grossed $20M at the Australian box office.

Hines' single "Water for Chocolate", written by the Family Stand, was released in Australia on 8 July 2006 and just missed the top 100, peaking at number 28 on the Australian Urban Singles Chart. The song was followed up by an album of the same name released on 19 August 2006. Two further singles, "Son of a Preacher Man" and "5 Days of Rain", were released in 2007.

In 2007, she collaborated with trumpeter James Morrison on an album of jazz standards, The Other Woman. Hines and Morrison performed an Australian National Theatre tour to near sell out audiences and received an ARIA nomination for "Best Jazz Album". They also performed at marquee festivals such as the Christchurch Jazz Festival and the Darling Harbour Jazz Festival.

=== 2008–2013: Film, television and theatre work ===
In 2008, she teamed up with Christine Anu for the charity single "Takin' it to The Street". In February 2009 a live DVD with bonus audio disc was released, taken for their two national tours.

In mid-2008, Hines received a call from Oscar-nominated film director Bruce Beresford and agreed to play a small role in Mao's Last Dancer. The film was released on 1 October 2009.

In 9 October, Hines became the ambassador for the humanitarian charity Oasis Africa Australia, where she visited the foundation's village and school in Kibera, Kenya, in January 2010. While there, Hines commenced recording a world music–style album featuring some of the local musicians and the children's choir from the Oasis Africa School.

July 2010 saw Hines reunite with Tamsin Carroll, from Dusty – The Original Pop Diva, to perform a series of shows called Dusty the Concert; it featured over 20 hits. There were 16 shows.

On 9 July 2011, Hines released a new single, "Finger on the Trigger", a Donna Summer classic. Produced by Rob Taylor and DJ Alex Taylor, its uptempo funky feel failed to get dance floors moving and bombed on the charts.

From October 2011, Hines featured in The Celebrity Apprentice Australia. She was fired after task 3, in which her team raised $47,400 for Oasis Africa Australia, but returned for the final episodes on Team Unity.

Hines played the role of Nerine Rogers in the third episode of Miss Fisher's Murder Mysteries, which aired in March 2012.

On 31 July 2012, Hines became engaged to Daniel Moses, a Sydney-based financier. They were married on 23 December 2012 in Sydney.

=== 2014–present: The Soul Sessions, The Tokyo Sessions and reality tv ===
Throughout 2013 and 2014, Hines performed the 'Café Soul Sessions' tour around Australia, and the idea for a soul-inspired album was born. The Soul Sessions was available for download only from her website from December 2014. On 18 November 2016, The Soul Sessions was released digitally and physically, with the lead single "What About Love", an original track co-written by Hines and Edward Said. The album also includes two other Hines co-writes, with "I Got Your Back" and "Runnin'".

In 2022 she was a contestant on Dancing with the Stars Australia where she finished as a finalist.

In 2024, Hines released The Tokyo Sessions, an album recorded over the previous years in Japan.

In 2026 she appeared as a contestant on Im A Celebrity Get Me Out Of Here Australia. She quit the show after 10 days.

== Personal life ==
In an interview, Hines stated that her father "had Somalian and Ethiopian in him".

In December 1993, Hines married INXS musician Kirk Pengilly. The marriage lasted 10 months and they parted ways in early 1995.

Hines married her boyfriend of 18 months, businessman and sometime-musician Daniel Moses, at Sergeant's Mess in Middle Head, overlooking Sydney Harbour National Park, in 2012.

== Discography ==
=== Studio albums ===
Title	Details	Chart positions			Sales and certifications
Title	Details	AUS	JPN	UK	Sales and certifications
Imagination/Pay Attention	Released: 20 May 1996; Label: Mushroom Records (RMD53453); Formats: CD, CS, LP	15	21	124	30,000 (Japan); 55,000 (worldwide)
Water for Chocolate	Released: 19 August 2006; Label: 3de Pty Ltd (3DE002); Formats: CD	—	—	—	
The Other Woman	Jazz album with James Morrison; Released: 13 October 2007; Label: MRA (JMDH2 / MR60762); Formats: CD, DD	86	—	—	
The Soul Sessions	Released: 18 November 2016; Label: Bitchin' Productions (BP001); Formats: CD, DD	—	—	—	
The Tokyo Sessions	Released: 30 August 2024; Featuring Ricky with FSP; Label: Tumbling Dice Records (TDR-009); Formats: CD, DD	—	—	—	
"—" denotes releases that did not chart or were not released in that territory.

=== Remix and compilation albums ===
Title	Details
Remix Your Imagination	Remix album; Released: 21 November 1997; Label: Mushroom / BMG (BVCP-1084); Formats: CD
A Delicious Collection / The Definitive Collection	Compilation album; Released: 17 June 2002; Label: Festival Records (334832); Formats: CD

=== Live albums ===
Title	Details
Takin' It to the Streets (with Christine Anu)	Live DVD + CD; Label: MGM Distribution (HAIRITAGE2); Released: 2008

=== Singles ===
==== As lead artist ====
Year	Single	Peak positions						Album
Year	Single	AUS	FRA	JPN	NZ	UK	US Dance	Album
1995	"It's Alright"	4	22	—	43	35	—	Imagination
1996	"Imagination"	37	—	—	—	—	—	Imagination
1996	"I Like the Way"	67	—	64	—	37	4	Imagination
1996	"I'm Not in Love"	86	—	—	—	—	—	Imagination
1997	"Dream Your Dream"	—	—	52	—	—	—	Remix Your Imagination
1998	"Joy"	94	—	—	—	47	13	Remix Your Imagination
1998	"Delicious" (featuring Don-E)	—	—	—	—	52	—	Pay Attention
2000	"Pull Up to the Bumper"	36	—	—	—	—	—	A Delicious Collection
2001	"Frenzy"	53	—	—	—	—	—	A Delicious Collection
2006	"Water for Chocolate"	102	—	—	—	—	—	Water for Chocolate
2006	"Son of a Preacher Man"	129	—	—	—	—	—	Water for Chocolate
2007	"5 Days of Rain" (featuring Bukkcity)	202	—	—	—	—	—	Water for Chocolate
2007	"I Only Have Eyes for You" (featuring James Morrison)	—	—	—	—	—	—	The Other Woman
2008	"Takin' It to the Streets" (with Christine Anu)	—	—	—	—	—	—	Takin' It to the Streets
2012	"Love Is in Control (Finger on the Trigger)" (with The A-Funk Allstars)	—	—	—	—	—	—	Non-album single
2016	"What About Love"	—	—	—	—	—	—	The Soul Sessions
2017	"I Got Your Back"	—	—	—	—	—	—	The Soul Sessions
2017	"Been So Long"	—	—	—	—	—	—	The Soul Sessions
2022	"Love You in This Life" (with Ricky With FSP)	—	—	—	—	—	—	Non-album single
2024	"Breathe" (with Ricky With FSP)	—	—	—	—	—	—	The Tokyo Sessions
2024	"Feel" (with Ricky With FSP)	—	—	—	—	—	—	The Tokyo Sessions
"—" denotes releases that did not chart or were not released in that territory.

==== As featured artist ====
Year	Single	Peak positions			Album
Year	Single	AUS	NZ	US	Album
1991	"Ain't No Sunshine" (Rockmelons featuring Deni Hines)	5	8	—	Form 1 Planet
1992	"That Word (L.O.V.E.)" (Rockmelons featuring Deni Hines)	4	5	—	Form 1 Planet
1992	"It's Not Over" (Rockmelons featuring Deni Hines)	15	17	—	Form 1 Planet
1992	"Not Enough Time" (by INXS; uncredited vocals)	—	—	28	Welcome to Wherever You Are
2003	"Erotic City" (Supafly featuring Deni Hines)	—	—	—	Single only
2006	"Stomp!" (Marcia Hines featuring Deni Hines)	43	—	—	Discothèque
2019	"Son of a Preacher Man" (Aexcit featuring Deni Hines)	—	—	—	Non-album single
"—" denotes releases that did not chart or were not released in that territory.

== Awards and nominations ==
=== ARIA Music Awards ===
The ARIA Music Awards is an annual awards ceremony that recognises excellence, innovation, and achievement across all genres of Australian music. They commenced in 1987.

Year	Nominee / work	Award	Result	Ref.
1993	"That Word (L.O.V.E.)"	Best Female Artist	Nominated	
1996	"It's Alright"	Breakthrough Artist – Single	Won	
1996	Imagination	Breakthrough Artist – Album	Nominated	
1996	Imagination	Best Female Artist	Nominated	
1997	"I'm Not in Love"	Best Pop Release	Nominated	
1997	"I'm Not in Love"	Best Female Artist	Nominated	
2008	The Other Woman (with James Morrison)	Best Jazz Album	Nominated	
