= Aussie Christmas with Bucko & Champs 2 =

Studio album by Bucko and Champs
- Released: November 1998
- Recorded: August 1997 and August 1998
- Label: EastWest
- Producer: Colin Buchanan, Greg Champion, Chris Wilson

Aussie Christmas with Bucko & Champs 2 is a Christmas album by Australian comedy duo Colin Buchanan and Greg Champion as Bucko and Champs. Released in November 1998, it peaked at number 67 and was certified platinum.

== Track listings ==
1998 release - EastWest (3984254762)

1. "C'mon It's an Aussie Christmas" - 2:30
2. "Santa's Moving To The South Pole" - 2:47
3. "Barry the Elf" - 2:01
4. "Snowink In Copenhagen" - 1:52
5. "The Christmas Bob Bloopers" - 1:56
6. "There's Nothing More Like Christmas" - 3:08
7. "Boombah the Snowman" - 2:10
8. "Cool Rockin' Santa" - 2:12
9. "Here Comes Christmas Bob" - 1:33
10. "Ryebuck Santa" - 2:57
11. "Australians Let Us Barbecue" - 2:01
12. "O Christmas Bush" - 3:42
13. "Merry Christmas Everywhere" - 2:47
14. "Twinkle Twinkle Little Town" - 4:25
15. "C'mon, It's An Aussie Christmas" (Karaoke Versions) - 2:30
16. "Santa's Moving To The South Pole" (Karaoke Versions) -2:47
17. "Snowink In Copenhagen" (Karaoke Versions) -1:52
18. "There's Nothing More Like Christmas" (Karaoke Versions) -3:08
19. "Boombah the Snowman" (Karaoke Versions) -2:10
20. "Cool Rockin' Santa" (Karaoke Versions) -2:12
21. "Here Comes Christmas Bob" (Karaoke Versions) -1:33
22. "Ryebuck Santa" (Karaoke Versions) -2:57
23. "O Christmas Bush" (Karaoke Versions) -3:42
24. "Merry Christmas Everywhere" (Karaoke Versions) -2:47
25. "Twinkle Twinkle Little Town" (Karaoke Versions) -4:25

== Charts ==
Chart (1998)	Peak position
Australian Albums (ARIA)	67

== Certifications ==
Region	Certification	Certified units/sales
Australia (ARIA)	Platinum	70,000^{^}
^{^} Shipments figures based on certification alone.
