= The Other Woman (Deni Hines and James Morrison album) =

Studio album by Deni Hines and James Morrison
- Released: 13 October 2007
- Genre: Jazz music
- Producer: James Morrison

Deni Hines albums chronology
Water for Chocolate (2007)	The Other Woman (2007)	The Soul Sessions (2014)

The Other Woman is a smooth jazz collaborative studio album by ARIA Award-winning recording artists, Deni Hines and James Morrison. The album was released in October 2007. Hines and Morrison toured the album throughout late 2007/early 2008 and recorded a live DVD of the tour.

At the ARIA Music Awards of 2008, The Other Woman was nominated for 'ARIA Award for Best Jazz Album', losing out to Footprints by Andrea Keller.

== Track listing ==
No.	Title	Writer(s)	Length
1.	"I Only Have Eyes For You"	Harry Warren, Al Dubin	3:30
2.	"Lady Sings The Blues"	Billie Holiday, Herbie Nichols	5:21
3.	"Too Darn Hot"	Cole Porter	3:04
4.	"Smoke Gets In Your Eyes"	Otto Harbach, Jerome Kern	4:52
5.	"All The Kings Horses"	Aretha Franklin	4:46
6.	"Them There Eyes"	Maceo Pinkard, Doris Tauber, William Tracey	3:06
7.	"The Man I Love"	George Gershwin, Ira Gershwin	3:34
8.	"Summertime"	George Gershwin, Ira Gershwin, DuBose Hayward	3:26
9.	"The Other Woman"	Jessie Mae Robinson	4:59
10.	"Strange Fruit"	Abel Meeropol	4:01
11.	"God Bless The Child"	Billie Holiday, Arthur Herzog, Jr.	5:07
12.	"Wake Up"	Deni Hines, James Morrison	2:54
13.	"The Very Thought Of You"	Ray Noble	3:44
14.	"Turn Me On"	John D. Loudermilk	3:46
15.	"(Tired Of Being) The Other Woman"	James Morrison	6:41
16.	"Someone To Watch Over Me"	George Gershwin, Ira Gershwin	4:34

== Charts ==
=== Weekly charts ===
Year	Country	Chart	Position
2007/08	Australia	ARIA Jazz & Blues Albums	2

=== Year-end charts ===
The Other Woman was the highest selling Jazz and Blues album by an Australian artist in 2007.

Chart (2007)	Position
Australian Jazz & Blues Album Chart	16
Chart (2008)	Position
Australian Jazz & Blues Album Chart	16

== Credits ==
- Alto saxophone, tenor saxophone, clarinet – Mark Taylor
- Arranged by James Morrison
- Double bass, electric bass – Phil Stack
- Drums – Gordon Rytmeister
- Guitar – James Muller
- Piano, keyboards – Tim Fisher
- Recorded and mixed by Daniel Brown
- Trombone [solo] – Dave Panichi
- Trumpet – Ralph Pyl
- Trumpet, flugelhorn, cornet, trumpet [digital], organ [Hammond], piano – James Morrison
- Violin, strings – Ian Cooper

== Release history ==
Region	Date	Label	Format	Catalogue
Australia	13 October 2007	JM & DH Pty Ltd/ MGM Records	CD, digital download	MRA MR60762
Australia	12 January 2009	JM & DH Pty Ltd	digital download	
