= Water for Chocolate =

Studio album by Deni Hines
- Released: 19 August 2006
- Genre: Pop, hip hop, funk, soul
- Label: 3DE

Deni Hines chronology
The Definitive Collection (2004)	Water for Chocolate (2006)	The Other Woman (2007)

Water for Chocolate is the second studio album by Deni Hines. Released in August 2006, it was her first album to be released independently. Three singles were released from the album: "Water for Chocolate", "Son of a Preacher Man" and "5 Days of Rain". Hines toured the album in 2007.

== Track listings ==
1. "Water for Chocolate" – 3:32
2. "5 Days of Rain" – 4:42
3. "Cut It Up" – 3:14
4. "Rhythm of Life" – 3:05
5. "Son of a Preacher Man" – 2:54
6. "New Day" – 3:22
7. "Ghetto Heaven" – 4:26
8. "Freedom" – 3:44
9. "Love Journey" – 3:56
10. "Sweet Lovin" – 3:52
11. "Getting On My Nerves" – 3:32
12. "That's You" – 3:59

== Release history ==
Region	Date	Label	Format	Catalogue
Australia	19 August 2006	3DE	CD, digital download	3DE002
