= Aussie Christmas with Bucko & Champs =

Studio album by Bucko and Champs
- Released: 1995
- Label: Massive
- Producers: Colin Buchanan, Greg Champion, Sam See

Its a very Aussie Christmas with Bucko & Champs is a Christmas album by Australian comedy duo Colin Buchanan and Greg Champion as Bucko and Champs. Released in 1995, it peaked at number 39 in December 1997 and was certified gold.

At the ARIA Music Awards of 1996, the album was nominated for Best Comedy Release.

== Track listings ==
1995 release - Massive (7310782)

1. "Aussie Jingle Bells" - 2:33
2. "Deck the Shed with Bits of Wattle" - 2:07
3. "Santa Claus Has Got a New Truck" - 1:34
4. "Frosty the Yobbo" - 2:25
5. "Robert the Red-Nosed Reindeer" - 1:39
6. "Six White Boomers" - 3:12
7. "We Three Kings" - 0:26
8. "Aussie Christmas Medley" - 2:19
9. "Good Old Wally King" - 3:08
10. "Everywhere It's Christmas" - 3:31
11. "The North Wind (Christmas Day)" - 2:15
12. "Santa Never Made It into Darwin" - 2:52
13. "Carol of the Birds" - 3:04
14. "It's Christmas Time" - 2:55
15. "Aussie Jingle Bells (Karaoke Version)" - 2:33
16. "Deck the Shed With Bits of Wattle (Karaoke Version)" - 2:07
17. "Santa Claus Has Got a New Truck (Karaoke Version)" - 1:34
18. "Robert the Red-Nosed Reindeer (Karaoke Version)" - 1:39
19. "The North Wind (Christmas Day) (Karaoke Version)" - 2:15

1999 re-release - EastWest (8573806832)

1. "Aussie Jingle Bells" - 2:33
2. "Deck the Shed with Bits of Wattle" - 2:07
3. "The Holly & The Ivy (Feral Pig & Cane Toad)" - 1:45
4. "He's the Aussie Santa" - 3:05
5. "We Wish You a Ripper Christmas" - 2:10
6. "Australians Let Us Barbecue #2" - 2:05
7. "Six White Boomers" - 3:12
8. "We Three Kings" - 0:26
9. "Father Christmas Showed Me How To Yodel" - 2:22
10. "Good Old Wally King" - 3:08
11. "Everywhere It's Christmas" - 3:31
12. "The North Wind (Christmas Day)" - 2:15
13. "Santa Never Made It Into Darwin" - 2:52
14. "Carol of the Birds" - 3:04
15. "It's Christmas Time" - 2:55
16. "Aussie Jingle Bells (Karaoke Version)" - 2:33
17. "Deck the Shed With Bits of Wattle (Karaoke Version)" - 2:07
18. "The Holly & The Ivy (Feral Pig & Cane Toad) (Karaoke Version)" - 1:45
19. "He's The Aussie Santa (Karaoke Version)" - 3:05
20. "We Wish You a Ripper Christmas (Karaoke Version)" - 2:10
21. "Australians Let Us Barbecue #2 (Karaoke Version)" - 2:05
22. "Fathers Christmas Showed Me How to Yodel (Karaoke Version)" - 2:22
23. "Good Old Wally King (Karaoke Version)" - 3:08
24. "Everywhere It's Christmas (Karaoke Version)" - 3:31
25. "The North Wind (Christmas Day) (Karaoke Version)" - 2:15
26. "Carol of the Birds (Karaoke Version)" - 3:04

== Charts ==
| Chart (1995–97) | Peak position |
|---|---|
| Australian Albums (ARIA) | 39 |

== Certifications ==
| Region | Certification | Certified units/sales |
|---|---|---|
| Australia (ARIA) | Gold | 35,000^{^} |
^{^} Shipments figures based on certification alone.
