= Neighbourhood Freak =

Single by Swoop

from the album The Woxo Principle
- Released: October 1994
- Recorded: 1994
- Studio: 48 Volt
- Label: Freakzone
- Songwriter(s): Joshua Beagley, Roland Kapferer, Alexander Hewettson
- Producer(s): Joshua Beagley, Roland Kapferer

Swoop singles chronology
"Do It" (1993)	"Neighbourhood Freak" (1994)	"Rock Dog" (1995)

"Neighbourhood Freak" is a song by Australian band Swoop and was released in October 1994 as the first single from the group's second studio album The Woxo Principle. It was their first charting single, peaking at number 62 on the ARIA Charts.

The song poled at number 74 in the Triple J Hottest 100, 1994.

== Track listings ==
Australian CD Single (SPACE:007)
No.	Title	Length
1.	"Neighborhood Freak"	3:53
2.	"Be What You Is"	3:49
3.	"Tommy Was a Fighter"	5:14
4.	"Gotta Have Your Own Thing"	3:51
5.	"Relief Suite (Part 1)"	4:58

Australian CD Single: The Remixes (SPACE:009)
No.	Title	Length
1.	"Neighborhood Freak" (Original Version)	3:53
2.	"Neighborhood Freak" (Got to Be a Real Freak 12")	5:20
3.	"Neighborhood Freak" (G-Freak 12")	6:10
4.	"Neighborhood Freak" (Got to Be a Real Freak 7")	3:44
5.	"Neighborhood Freak" (G-Freak 7")	4:13
6.	"Neighborhood Freak" (House Freak 12")	6:40
7.	"Neighborhood Freak" (House Freak 7")	3:40
8.	"Neighborhood Freak" (Techno Freak)	8:42

== Charts ==
Chart performance for "Neighbourhood Freak"
Chart (1994)	Peak position
Australia (ARIA)	62
