= It's Alright (Deni Hines song) =

1995 single by Deni Hines

Single by Deni Hines

from the album Imagination
- Released: 23 October 1995
- Length: 3:47
- Label: Mushroom
- Songwriters: Ian Green, Michelle Lewis
- Producer: Ian Green

Deni Hines singles chronology
"It's Not Over" (1992)	"It's Alright" (1995)	"Imagination" (1996)

Alternative cover
- European cover

"It's Alright" is a song by Australian singer songwriter Deni Hines, released as her debut single. It was released in October 1995 as the first single from her debut studio album, Imagination (1996). The single peaked at number four in Australia. At the ARIA Music Awards of 1996, "It's Alright" won the award for Breakthrough Artist – Single; her acceptance speech was: "I don't know, um, thanks and grouse!"

== Track listing ==
Australian maxi-CD single

1. "It's Alright" (7-inch radio mix) – 3:47
2. "It's Alright" (D Influence mix) – 4:18
3. "It's Alright" (G Division mix) – 4:22
4. "It's Alright" (D Influence Extra Bits) – 4:12

European CD single

1. "It's Alright" (D-Influence radio edit) – 3:29
2. "It's Alright" (Don-E radio edit) – 3:55

== Charts ==
=== Weekly charts ===
Chart (1995–1997)	Peak position
Australia (ARIA)	4
Belgium (Ultratop 50 Wallonia)	34
Europe (Eurochart Hot 100)	80
France (SNEP)	22
New Zealand (Recorded Music NZ)	43
UK Singles (OCC)	35

=== Year-end charts ===
Chart (1995)	Position
Australia (ARIA)	42

Chart (1996)	Position
Australia (ARIA)	96

== Certifications ==
Region	Certification	Certified units/sales
Australia (ARIA)	Platinum	70,000^{^}
France (SNEP)	Gold	250,000^{*}
^{*} Sales figures based on certification alone.^{^} Shipments figures based on certification alone.
