= George Moore (radio presenter) =

Australian DJ, Announcer and Radio show host

George Moore (formerly known as Les Pridmore), was born in Wagga Wagga, New South Wales, Australia. He has been on Australian radio for 40 years as a DJ, Announcer and Radio show host. He originally started his radio career at 2WG in Wagga Wagga during the late 1960s. During his time there he was also a singer with a popular Wagga rock band, "Lost & Found".

Since then Moore has worked in Sydney radio stations with stints at 2SM, 2Day FM, 2UW/Mix 106.5,2UE and finally with 2GB where he co-hosted the weekend breakfast show with Paul B. Kidd until December 2019. Co-host Paul B. Kidd was a former dishwasher, mortuary attendant, crop-sprayer, jackeroo, TV salesman, cleaner, waiter, restaurateur, publican, caterer, poulterer, SP bookmaker, real estate salesman, photo-journalist, television presenter and script writer, columnist, features writer, magazine editor, publisher, author and currently a radio commentator.

During his time on radio Moore has conducted interviews with major stars such as Ashley Judd and Angelina Jolie and with prominent Australian politicians, including former NSW premier Bob Carr, Prime Minister John Howard, Treasurer Peter Costello and Foreign Affairs Minister Alexander Downer
