= I Like the Way (Deni Hines song) =

Single by Deni Hines

from the album Imagination
- Released: 17 June 1996
- Recorded: 1995
- Genre: Electronic music, house music, R&B, garage music
- Length: 3:35
- Label: Festival Mushroom Records; Warner Bros. Records
- Songwriters: Ian Green, Deni Hines
- Producer: Ian Green

Deni Hines singles chronology
"Imagination" (1996)	"I Like the Way" (1996)	"I'm Not in Love" (1996)

"I Like the Way" is a song by Australian singer songwriter, Deni Hines. The song was released in June 1996 as the third single from her debut studio album, Imagination (1996). The single missed the top fifty in Australia, but peaked at number 37 in the United Kingdom and at number 4 on the Dance Club Songs in the United States.

== Track listing ==
Australian CD single (MUSH7DCX)

1. "I Like The Way" (Album Mix Radio Edit) - 3:35
2. "I Like The Way" (Acapella) - 4:36
3. "How Can I Be Sure?" - 4:05

European CD Maxi

1. "I Like The Way" (Album Mix Radio Edit) - 3:35
2. "I Like The Way" (Don-E Master Mix) - 4:5-
3. "I Like The Way" (Don-E 90BPM Master Mix) - 5:23
4. "I Like The Way" (Richie P Chill Mix) - 4:15
5. "I Like The Way" (David Morales Prelude Mix) - 10:52
6. "I Like The Way" (David Morales Classic Club Mix) - 9:40

== Charts ==
Chart (1996–1998)	Peak position
Australia (ARIA)	67
UK Singles (OCC)	37
US Billboard Hot Dance/Club Play	4

== Credits ==
- Arranged by [Strings] – Stephen Hussey
- Artwork [design] – Ade Britteon, Craig Gentle, Michelle Le Tissier
- Engineer – Pete Lewis, Tim Russell
- Strings [strings performed by] – Pure Strings*
- Drums, bass, electric piano [Fender Rhodes], sitar, guitar, programmed and arranged by [strings] – Ian Green
