= Paul B. Kidd =

Australian author, journalist, and radio show host (1945–2021)

- Kidd in 2020
- Born: Paul Benjamin Kidd; 1945; Australia
- Died: 26 December 2021 (aged 76); Sydney, New South Wales, Australia
- Other name: Paul Kidd
- Occupations: Author, journalist, radio show host

Paul Benjamin Kidd (1945 – 26 December 2021) was an Australian author, journalist, and radio show host. From 2001 until 2020, Kidd was the co-host of the 2UE George and Paul weekend show with George Moore; from 2020 until his death, he co-hosted Weekends with John and Paul with John Stanley on 2GB. Kidd was also a prolific true crime writer, having published a large number of books about high-profile murder cases across Australia and the world.

== Early career ==
Paul Benjamin Kidd was born in 1945. He began writing in 1970. A self-described "big game fisher", he was in turn the editor of Fishing News, The Tackle Trader, and Fishing Australia Monthly. He was also a photojournalist.

== Radio host ==
Prior to becoming a host for 2UE, Kidd was the station's fishing and boating commentator. He attained the hosting position for the weekend morning show in 2001 after having originally appeared as a guest, and spent the next two decades co-hosting the show with George Moore. After fifteen years, the show switched from 2UE to 2GB. The show, called simply The George and Paul Show, was a profitable ratings success described as a "unique blend of conservative politics and quiz shows".

In late 2019, Moore announced his retirement from The George and Paul Show. Kidd later teamed up with John Stanley to co-host Weekends with John and Paul, changing his timeslot from 9am-2pm to 2pm-6pm.

== True crime writing ==
Kidd was a prolific writer on Australian crime, with 37 published works. His most widely disseminated book, Till Death Do Us Part: True Stories of Australian Marriages That Ended in Murder, is held by 106 WorldCat libraries worldwide. Other books by Kidd to attract significant attention include Celluloid Serial Killers, also published as Cinema Serial Killers, and 50 Australian Crimes of the 20th Century.

Kidd's true crime works have been the subject of controversy over their sociological claims, particularly about Indigenous Australians. His book 50 Australian Crimes of the 20th Century was criticized for its coverage of the murder of Sandra Hoare, a white nurse murdered in 1994 while working in a remote Indigenous town. Kidd's description of the peripheral and troubled lifestyles of the murderers as typical for many rural Indigenous Australians spending their lives in "a disoriented coma from alcohol, marijuana, and petrol fumes" was described as a racist and narrow perspective of Indigenous communities.

== Personal life ==
Kidd lived in Bondi and was married five times. In 2008, he was diagnosed with bladder cancer; he had a "cardiac episode" in 2018, which prevented him from hosting a cruise with Moore for a group of fans. Kidd died on 26 December 2021 after a "protracted illness", at the age of 76; his death was announced the following day on 2GB's Twitter account. His death was mourned by his colleagues, with 2GB presenter Clinton Maynard describing him as a "unique Australian character" and a significant force in the national radio industry and breakfast presenter Ben Fordham calling him a "generous soul". Moore described the death as expected due to Kidd's health issues, but nonetheless "a damn shock".
