= Laura Chislett =

Australian flute player

Laura Chislett is an Australian flute player She performs contemporary repertoire including Brian Ferneyhough's Unity Capsule, James Dillon's Sgothan, Michael Finnissy's Sikangnuqa, Reza Vali's Song flute solo and Maurice Weddington's Deovolente. Her repertoire also includes neglected 20th-century works by Lili Boulanger, Willem Pijper, Augusta Holmès, and Jean Binet. Laura has performed as a guest soloist with orchestra/ensemble at major festivals, including the Huddersfield Contemporary Music Festival, the Sydney Spring Festival, Insel Musik Berlin, the Pittsburgh International Music Festival and the Australian Chamber Orchestra performing Michael Smetanin's flute concerto Shakhmat/Supremat.

Formerly known as Laura Chislett Jones, she has given recitals and/or masterclasses in Australia, Ireland, Sweden, the Netherlands, Italy, Switzerland, Luxembourg, Thailand, China and the USA.

Recent improvisation collaborations have been with Satsuki Odamura (koto), Brad Gill (composer/vibraphone), and Edward Cowie (composer/piano). The 'In Two Minds' CD with Edward Cowie was released by Métier Divine Art Recordings in February 2024.

Chislett has a Bachelor of Music Performance from the Sydney Conservatorium of Music, a Master of Creative Arts from the University of Wollongong, Australia and since 2014 has been an Adjunct Academic at the School of Arts and Media of the University of New South Wales, Australia, where she teaches.

Laura also interviews and writes for The Babel Flute magazine and teaches advanced students in Sydney, Australia.

Laura plays a platinum-plated Muramatsu PTP flute.

== Recordings ==
=== Solo or duo ===
- The Flute Ascendant... (VAST 007-2) 1992, Vox Australis
- Chris Dench: Music for Flute (ETC 1146) 1993, Etcetera Records, Holland
- Flute Impressions with David Miller, piano, (WAL 8018-2 CD) 1994, Walsingham Classics
- The Flute in Orbit with Stephanie McCallum, piano, (ABC 446 738-2) 1995, ABC Classics
- Flute Vox 2015 with Stephanie McCallum, piano, ABC Commercial

=== Ensemble ===
- Kraanerg by Iannis Xenakis (KTC 1075) Etcetera Records, conducted by Roger Woodward
- Strange Attractions, Sydney Alpha Ensemble (ABC 4565372) 1997 ABC Classics
- Against the Wind, original soundtrack by Jon English and Mario Millo, Redmoon Music RED06-009

=== Single tracks ===
- Chris Dench: Sulle scale della Fenice on Perspectives of New Music (PNM 29) 1991, USA
- Richard Karpen: Exchange for flute and tape, Le Chant du Monde, cultures electroniques/2, 1987, France
- Chris Dench: De/ploye and Phillipe Durville: After Effect on Fonit Cetra (CDC 45) 1989, Italy
- Jane O'Leary: Duo for Alto Flute and Guitar, with John Feeley, Overture Music 30, Ireland, 2010
- Katia Tiutiunnik: Duo for flute and piano, The Quickening, with Australian pianist Stephanie McCallum, re-released on the Australian Broadcasting Corporation, ABC Classics album, Women of Note: A Century of Australian Composers Volume 2, Australia, 2020

== Further reading and listening ==
- Laura Chislett - Flute Player/Teacher/Performer official web site
- Listen to Laura Chislett on Spotify, Laura Chislett on YouTube, Laura Chislett on Apple Music, Laura Chislett on Amazon Music, Laura Chislett on TikTok Music, Laura Chislett on Deezer
- A Performer's Notebook by Laura Chislett, Perspectives of New Music, Vol. 29
- Flute Vox CD, Australian Music Centre
- Review of Laura Chislett's Flute Vox, Limelight Magazine, Sydney, Australia
- Laura Chislett Flute Vox Reviews, Fanfare Magazine, USA
- Review: Flute Impressions: Romantic Music for Flute and Piano, Laura Chislett - flute, David Miller - piano", Fanfare Magazine, USA
- Review: The Flute Ascendant, Fanfare Magazine, USA
