= Greg Champion =

Australian songwriter (born 1955)

Greg Champion OAM (born 1955) is an Australian songwriter, guitarist, and radio personality.

== Biography ==
Born in Benalla, Victoria, Champion is most recognised for his work as part of the Coodabeen Champions as a songwriter and guitarist. Greg often appears on the program writing songs about both Australian rules football and cricket.

He is an avid Australian rules football fan, supporting the Adelaide Crows, and since the 1980s has penned many tunes on the Australian game. Of these, the most famous is "That's the Thing About Football", which has gone down as a classic Australian rules song, and has been used on Seven Network's Australian Football League coverage since Seven bought rights to the song in 1994. The song would peak at 31 on the ARIA charts following the 1994 AFL Grand Final. Seven would use the song over a number of seasons, later remixing it with different vocalists.

Greg Champion spent his early childhood in Vienna, before his family moved back to Australia. He grew up in Hectorville, a suburb of the South Australian capital Adelaide, and was educated at Pulteney Grammar.

He would move to Melbourne in the late 1970s, and beginning in 1981 on Melbourne radio station 3RRR has appeared on various Australian radio stations (especially ABC Local Radio) as part of the Coodabeens team, singing parodies of popular songs and relating them to Australian rules footballers.

Champion has written hundreds of songs (many serious, many humorous) and is a multi-awarded country/folk singer, who after being discovered in the Catacombs (an Adelaide folk club of the 1970s), went on to form the band Tidewater before launching a successful solo career.

Champion's highest-selling album is the 1995-released Aussie Christmas with Bucko & Champs with Australian country music star Colin Buchanan. In 1998, Aussie Christmas with Bucko & Champs 2 was released featuring 25 Christmas-themed songs.

Champion would play his song "That's the Thing About Football" at both the 1995 AFL Grand Final and 2002 AFL Grand Final matches.

In 2006, his song "Been There, Done That" peaked at number 4 on the Country Music Chart, having been released that year as part of The Shack Tapes.

In 2009, Greg released his album Strayana.

In 2010, Champion was awarded Victorian Male Vocalist in the Victorian Country Music Awards for his song "this was my town (Marysville)".

In 2012, just prior to heading off to his 22nd Tamworth Country Music Festival, he surprised many with his album Emergence which had a wide range of musical styles of 11 original songs.

In 2017, Champion headlined the All Star Musical Comedy Showcase at the Melbourne International Comedy Festival.

In 2021, Champion moved back to Adelaide after more than four decades in Melbourne, forming a new band with Scott Opie, Tom Stehlik and Goof Miller.

== Discography ==
=== Studio albums ===
| Year | Album details | Peak chart positions | Certifications (sales thresholds) |
| Year | Album details | AUS | Certifications (sales thresholds) |
|---|---|---|---|
| Work Hard Play Hard | Released: 1985; Label: Impressive Records | | |
| Greg Champion | Released: 1990; Label: ABC/EMI | | |
| That's What I Like About Football Volume I | Released: 1994; Label: Massive (7310152) | 31 | |
| Everybody Loves to watch the Cricket | Released: 1995; Label: Massive (7310314) | | |
| That's What I Like About Football Volume II | Released: 1995; Label: Massive (7310492) | | |
| Aussie Christmas with Bucko & Champs (with Colin Buchanan) | Released: 1994; Label: Massive (7310782) | 39 | AUS: Gold |
| Football is a Funny Game | Released: 1996; Label: Massive (0630159252) | | |
| Australian Music | Released: 1997; Label: Massive (7320462) | | |
| Aussie Christmas with Bucko & Champs 2 (with Colin Buchanan) | Released: 1998; Label: | 67 | AUS: Platinum |
| Stand Back Australia | Released: 2000; Label: Warner | | |
| Shady Tree | Released: 2002; Label: Greg Champion (champs003) | | |
| North & South | Released: 2004; Label: ABC Country (13672) | | |
| Cricket's on the Radio | Released: 2005; Label: ABC Country (14292) | | |
| The Shack Tapes | Released: 2006; Label: ORIGiN (OR 069) | | |
| Strayana | Released: 2009; Label: Compass Bros. (063CDCB) | | |
| Emergence | Released: 2012; Label: Greg Champion | | |
| A Whole Different Story | Released: 2013; Label: Greg Champion | | |
| Happy Travels | Released: 2017; Label: Greg Champion | | |
| That Keilor Beat | Released: 2020; Label: Greg Champion | | |

=== Compilation albums ===
| Title | Details |
|---|---|
| Best of Greg Champion | Released: 2003 |
| 50 Fave Footy Ditties | Released: 2010; Label: Shock |
| At This Stage – Songs 1990-2010 | Released: May 2011; Label: Greg Champion (CHAMPS008) |
| Thirty Years of Footy Songs | Released: 2012; Label: Greg Champion |
| Thirty Years of Footy Songs Vol II | Released: 2013; Label: Greg Champion |
| All the Fun Ones | Released: 2015; Label: Greg Champion (CHAMPS016) |
| Gather My Fishing Lines: A Greg Champion Collection | Released: 2016 |
| Best of 1985-2015 + Happy Travels | Released: 2017 |

=== Charted and certified singles ===
List of charted and certified singles, with selected chart positions
| Title | Year | Peak chart positions | Certification | Album |
| Title | Year | AUS | Certification | Album |
|---|---|---|---|---|
| "That's the Thing About Football" | 1994 | 31 | | That's What I Like About Football |
| "Aussie Jingle Bells" | 1995 | - | ARIA: Gold | Aussie Christmas with Bucko & Champs |

== Awards and recognition ==
Champion was awarded the Medal of the Order of Australia (OAM) in the 2022 Queen's Birthday Honours.

=== ARIA Music Awards ===
The ARIA Music Awards are a set of annual ceremonies presented by Australian Recording Industry Association (ARIA), which recognise excellence, innovation, and achievement across all genres of the music of Australia. They commenced in 1987.

| Year | Nominated works | Award | Result | Ref |
|---|---|---|---|---|
| 1996 | Aussie Christmas (as Bucko and Champs) | Best Comedy Release | Nominated | |
| 2000 | Stand Back Australia | Best Comedy Release | Nominated | |

=== Country Music Awards of Australia ===
The Country Music Awards of Australia (CMAA) (also known as the Golden Guitar Awards) is an annual awards night held in January during the Tamworth Country Music Festival, celebrating recording excellence in the Australian country music industry. They have been held annually since 1973.

| Year | Nominee / work | Award | Result (wins only) |
|---|---|---|---|
| 1994 | "May Your Fridge Be Full of Coldies" | Video Track of the Year | Won |

=== Tamworth Songwriters Awards ===
The Tamworth Songwriters Association (TSA) is an annual songwriting contest for original country songs, awarded in January at the Tamworth Country Music Festival. They commenced in 1986. Greg Champion has won two awards.

| Year | Nominee / work | Award | Result (wins only) |
|---|---|---|---|
| 1994 | "May Your Fridge Be Full of Coldies" by Greg Champion | Comedy/ Novelty Song of the Year | Won |
| 1996 | "Don't Call Wagga Wagga, Wagga" by Greg Champion and Jim Haynes | Comedy/ Novelty Song of the Year | Won |
