= Swoop (Australian band) =

Australian musical band

- Origin: Sydney, New South Wales, Australia
- Genres: Rock; funk; disco; alternative dance
- Years active: 1991–1999
- Labels: Freakzone; Mushroom; Festival; Orange
- Past members: Joshua Beagley; Roland Kapferer; Fiona Ta'akimoeaka; Chris Brien; Armando Gomez; Alex 'Gob' Hewetson; Breadman St Ledger; Terepai Richmond; Calvin Welch; Tetsushi Morita; Rebekah Jane; Robert Woolf

Swoop were an Australian seven-piece rock, funk and disco band established in 1991 by mainstays by Joshua Beagley on guitar and keyboards and Roland Kapferer on lead vocals (rapping, MCing). They released three studio albums, Thriller (October 1993), The Woxo Principle (November 1995) and Be What You Is (January 1999). Their most popular single, "Apple Eyes" (1995), reached No. 9 in Australia on the ARIA singles chart, and was certified gold by ARIA.

== History ==
=== 1991–1993: Thriller ===
Swoop were an Australian seven-piece rock, funk and disco band established in 1991 in Sydney as a funk and rap duo by Joshua Beagley on guitar and keyboards and Roland Kapferer on lead vocals (rapping, MCing). The pair had met as students at Marryatville High School, Adelaide in 1987 before relocating to Sydney. The duo were joined by "an ever-changing line-up that has featured a collection of rappers, DJs, musos and dancers". The band released two early singles "Positivity's Groove" (May 1992) and "Jelly Funk" (August). Fiona Ta'akimoeaka joined Swoop on lead vocals before August 1992 and by November the other members of the seven-piece were Chris Brien on drums, Armando Gomez on percussion, Alex 'Gob' Hewetson (previously a member of Directions In Groove) on bass guitar and Breadman St Ledger III on keyboards.

For their third single "Everybody Loves the Sunshine", which appeared in November 1992, they were briefly joined by Terepai Richmond (also a member of Directions In Groove) on percussion. Rebecca Lang of The Canberra Times described their sound, "Drawing on the '70s funk, dipping into '90s acid jazz and adding a blend of '80s rap." In August 1993 the group issued "Do It", which became a disco hit in Japan; it was also listed at No. 87 on national radio station Triple J's popularity poll, Triple J Hottest 100, 1993. It was followed with their debut studio album, Thriller via Freakzone Records/MGM Distribution in October. Beagley recalled "we released [it] on our own label purely through frustration of not being able to get a deal. The end result was a deal so it was worth all the pain."

=== 1994–1999: The Woxo Principle and Be What You Is ===
In October 1994 Swoop released "Neighbourhood Freak", which became the group's first charting single, peaking at No. 62 on the ARIA singles chart. That track appeared at No.74 on Triple J Hottest 100, 1994. At the ARIA Music Awards of 1994 they were nominated for Best New Talent for Thriller. During 1994 and 1995 the group played regular gigs in the Gershwin Room at St Kilda's Esplanade Hotel. The group released "Rock Dog" in July 1995 and followed in October with "Apple Eyes", which peaked at No. 9 on the ARIA Charts and was certified gold by ARIA in the following year for shipment of 35000 copies. "Apple Eyes" was listed at No. 32 on Triple J Hottest 100, 1995.

In November 1995 Swoop released their second studio album The Woxo Principle via Mushroom Records/Festival Records. It reached No. 51 on the ARIA albums chart. The Canberra Times' Liz Armitage felt, "it does embrace the spontaneity and spirit that makes a really good band. Lyrically, Swoop has always been dodgy... and this shows no sign of changing." Simon Woodridge of Juice Magazine observed, they "contrived a cheesy amalgam of funk/rock/disco/pop on [this album], and they've put it together with enough skill to make overlooking the amount of second hand riffage totally painless." Two further singles were released from the album, including their cover version of Captain & Tennille's "Do That to Me (One More Time)" (September 1996). At the ARIA Music Awards of 1996 they were nominated for Song of the Year and Best Video for "Apple Eyes", and Best Pop Release for The Woxo Principle.

The group took a six-month break from touring and performing while Kapferer finished his PhD. During that break Ta'akimoeaka left the band in 1996 and was replaced by Rebekah Jane (later known as Rebekah LaVauney) as lead vocalist in 1997. Brien was replaced by American-born Allen Murphey. By 1998 latter-day members included drummer Calvin Welch and Japanese-born keyboard player Tetsushi Morita.

Swoop issued "Blood Runs Hot" (May 1998), the lead single from their third studio album Be What You Is, which was released in January 1999. Also in that month they provided "Remedy". The group performed "Angel Eyes" at Mushroom 25 Concert in November 1998 and disbanded thereafter.

=== 2000–present: After Swoop ===
After Swoop, Beagley, Kapferer and Welch formed Professor Groove & the Booty Affair with Sam Dixon on bass guitar and Robert Woolf on keyboards and vocals (later replaced by Richard Stanford on keyboards). They released their debut album, And so Funketh the Wise Man in 2001.

Rebekah Jane as Rebekah LaVauney reached the top 8 on Australian Idol in 2003 and issued an EP, Chapter 1 in 2005. Brien became a live and recording session musician, drum clinician and teacher; in November 2006 he relocated to Hong Kong.

== Members ==
- Joshua Beagley – electric, acoustic guitars (1991–1999)
- Roland Kapferer – lead vocals (rap) (1991–1999)
- Fiona Ta'akimoeaka – lead vocals (1992–1996)
- Chris Brien – drums, bells, tambourine, voices (1992–1997)
- Armando Gomez – wood block
- Alex Hewetson – bass guitar (1994–1999)
- Breadman St Ledger – piano, electric pianos, organ, clavinet, synthesisers, xylophone, mellotron, talk box
- Terepai Richmond – percussion (1992–1992)
- Rebekah Jane a.k.a. Rebekah LaVauney – lead vocals (1997–1999)
- Allen Murphey – drums (1997–1998)
- Tetsushi Morita – keyboards (1998–1999)
- Calvin Welch – drums (1998–1999)

== Discography ==
=== Studio albums ===
List of studio albums, with selected details, chart positions and certifications
Title	Details	Peak chart positions
Title	Details	AUS
Thriller	Released: August 1993; Label: Freakzone /MGM (A FREAKY 1); Format: CD	160
The Woxo Principle	Released: November 1995; Label: Mushroom (D31445); Format: CD	51
Be What You Is	Released: January 1999; Label: Mushroom (MUSH33138.2); Format: CD	—

=== Compilation album ===
Compilation album with selected details
Title	Details
Freak Fun	Released: 1998 (Japanese release); Label: Orange (ORANGE1002); Format: CD

=== Extended play ===
Extended play with selected details and chart positions
Title	Details	Peak chart positions
Title	Details	AUS
The Raw Funk Power	Released: 1994; Label: Freakzone (Space005); Format: CD	96

=== Singles ===
List of singles, showing selected chart positions and certifications
Title	Year	Peak chart positions	Certifications	Album
Title	Year	AUS	Certifications	Album
"Positivity's Groove"	1992	—		non-album singles
"Jelly Funk"	1992	—		non-album singles
"Everybody Loves the Sunshine"	1992	—		Thriller
"Do It"	1993	—		Thriller
"Neighbourhood Freak"	1994	62		The Woxo Principle
"Rock Dog"	1995	83		The Woxo Principle
"Apple Eyes"	1995	9	ARIA: Gold	The Woxo Principle
"(It Could Happen) Any Day Now"	1996	74		The Woxo Principle
"Do That to Me (One More Time)"	1996	139		The Woxo Principle
"Remedy"	1998	—		Be What You Is
"Blood Runs Hot"	1998	173		Be What You Is

== Awards and nominations ==
=== ARIA Music Awards ===
The ARIA Music Awards is an annual awards ceremony that recognises excellence, innovation, and achievement across all genres of Australian music. They commenced in 1987.

Year	Nominee / work	Award	Result	Ref.
1994	Thriller	Best New Talent	Nominated	
1996	The Woxo Principle	Best Pop Release	Nominated	
1996	"Apple Eyes"	Song of the Year	Nominated	
1996	John Fransic for Swoop – "Apple Eyes"	Best Video	Nominated	
