= 1996 ARIA Music Awards =

Annual Australian music awards

- Date: 30 September 1996
- Venue: Sydney Convention & Exhibition Centre, Sydney, New South Wales

Highlights
- Most wins: You Am I (6)
- Most nominations: Your Am I (9)
- Website: ariaawards.com.au

Television/radio coverage
- Network: Network Ten

The 10th Australian Recording Industry Association Music Awards (generally known as the ARIA Music Awards or simply the ARIAs) was held on 30 September 1996 at the Sydney Convention and Exhibition Centre. Presenters distributed 28 awards with the big winner for the year was You Am I gaining six awards.

In addition to previous categories an Outstanding Achievement Award was presented to Silverchair, which acknowledged "[their] conquering world charts with the single 'Tomorrow' and the debut album Frogstomp." A Special Achievement Award was presented to Slim Dusty. The ARIA Hall of Fame inducted: Australian Crawl and Horrie Dargie. Australian Crawl's founding guitarist Brad Robinson, was unable to attend; he was hospitalised with lymphoma (diagnosed three years earlier) and died two weeks after the ceremony. It was also the final Australian performance by INXS with original frontman Michael Hutchence before his death 14 months later.

== Ceremony details ==
Australian music journalist, Anthony O'Grady, observed, "It was the last of the Bigger-Than-Ben-Hur Award nights (for the foreseeable future). Over 4,000 (the largest crowd ever and 8 times the number at the first Awards) flooded into the [venue]... [with a] repast at over 200 tables supplied by a dozen kitchens." Deni Hines won a trophy for Breakthrough Artist – Single for "It's Alright". Her entire acceptance speech was:

I don't know, um, thanks and grouse!

— Deni Hines, 30 September 1996

=== Presenters and performers ===
The ARIA Awards ceremony was hosted by American musicians Harry Connick Jr. and Chris Isaak. Presenters and performers were:

Presenter(s)	Performer(s)	Ref.
Chris Isaak	Harry Connick Jr.	
Harry Connick Jr.	Harry Connick Jr.	
Jenny Morris	Harry Connick Jr.	
Glenn A. Baker	David Helfgott	
Richard O'Brien	David Helfgott	
Michael Hutchence	David Helfgott	
Neneh Cherry	Kulcha, CDB	
"Ugly" Phil O'Neill	Kulcha, CDB	
Christine Anu	Kulcha, CDB	
Richard Wilkins	Powderfinger – "Pick You Up"	
David Gates	Powderfinger – "Pick You Up"	
Anne Kirkpatrick	Powderfinger – "Pick You Up"	
Gina Jeffreys	Gina Jeffreys, Keith Urban, Troy Cassar-Daley, Lee Kernaghan, Tommy Emmanuel	
Billy Birmingham	Gina Jeffreys, Keith Urban, Troy Cassar-Daley, Lee Kernaghan, Tommy Emmanuel	
Daryl Braithwaite	Gina Jeffreys, Keith Urban, Troy Cassar-Daley, Lee Kernaghan, Tommy Emmanuel	
Dave Graney	Jimmy Barnes	
Tex Perkins	Jimmy Barnes	
Jimmy Barnes	Jimmy Barnes	
Helen Razer	Deni Hines	
Mikey Robins	Deni Hines	
Ash	Deni Hines	
Savage Garden	INXS	
Shirley Manson	INXS	
Chrissy Amphlett	INXS	
Cathy Freeman	You Am I	
Kieren Perkins	You Am I	
Molly Meldrum	You Am I	

== Awards ==
Final nominees for awards are shown in plain, with winners in bold.

=== ARIA Awards ===
- Album of the Year
  - **You Am I – Hourly, Daily**
    - Nick Cave and the Bad Seeds – Murder Ballads
    - John Farnham – Romeo's Heart
    - Finn – Finn
    - Regurgitator – Tu-Plang
- Single of the Year
  - **Nick Cave & Kylie Minogue – "Where the Wild Roses Grow"**
    - Ammonia – "Drugs"
    - Tina Arena – "Wasn't It Good"
    - Powderfinger – "Pick You Up"
    - You Am I – "Mr. Milk"
- Highest Selling Album
  - **Tina Arena – Don't Ask**
    - John Williamson – True Blue – The Very Best of John Williamson
    - Martin/Molloy – The Brown Album
    - Merril Bainbridge – The Garden
    - Max Sharam – A Million Year Girl
- Highest Selling Single
  - **CDB – "Let's Groove"**
    - Crowded House – "Everything Is Good for You"
    - Merril Bainbridge – "Under the Water"
    - Peter Andre – "Mysterious Girl"
    - Regurgitator – New (EP) (Note: ARIA lists Regurgitator's highest selling single as "New Detention". Regurgitator's highest placing on the singles chart for 1995/96 was for their extended play, New. They have not released a single called "New Detention".)
- Best Group
  - **You Am I – Hourly, Daily** (Note: ARIA lists You Am I as the winner of 'Best Group' category but does not display its 'Best Album' category winner here. Other nominees have an album or single displayed.)
    - The Badloves – Holy Roadside
    - Crowded House – "Everything Is Good for You"
    - Regurgitator – Tu-Plang
    - Silverchair – "Blind"
- Best Female Artist
  - **Christine Anu** – "**Come On**"
    - Tina Arena – "Wasn't It Good"
    - Kate Ceberano – "Change"
    - Deni Hines – Imagination
    - Max Sharam – "Is it OK" / "Huntinground"
- Best Male Artist
  - **Dave Graney – The Soft 'N Sexy Sound**
    - Diesel – Short Cool Ones
    - John Farnham – Romeo's Heart
    - Paul Kelly – Deeper Water
    - Tex Perkins – "You're Too Beautiful"
- Best New Talent
  - **Monique Brumby – "Fool for You"**
    - Human Nature – "Got It Goin' On"
    - Fiona Kernaghan – Cypress Grove
    - Rail – Bad Hair Life
    - Ute – Under the External
- Breakthrough Artist – Album
  - **Regurgitator – Tu-Plang**
    - Ammonia – Mint 400
    - Merril Bainbridge – The Garden
    - Deni Hines – Imagination
    - Pollyanna – Long Player
- Breakthrough Artist – Single
  - **Deni Hines – "It's Alright"**
    - Monique Brumby – "Fool for You"
    - Nikka Costa – "Master Blaster"
    - Rail – "Immune Deficiency"
    - Savage Garden – "I Want You"
- Best Dance Release
  - **Future Sound of Melbourne – Chapter One**
    - DJ Darren (Darren Briais) & DJ Pee Wee – "I Feel It"
    - Infusion – Smoke Screen
    - Itch-E and Scratch-E – "Howling Dog"
    - Renegade Funktrain – Renegade Funktrain
- Best Pop Release
  - **Nick Cave & Kylie Minogue – "Where the Wild Roses Grow"**
    - Christine Anu – "Come On"
    - Tina Arena – "Wasn't It Good"
    - Hoodoo Gurus – Blue Cave
    - Swoop – The Woxo Principle
- Best Country Album
  - **Dead Ringer Band – Home Fires**
    - Graeme Connors – The Here and Now
    - Lee Kernaghan – 1959
    - Tania Kernaghan – December Moon
    - The Wheel – The Wheel
- Best Independent Release
  - **You Am I – Hourly, Daily**
    - Custard – Wisenheimer
    - Ed Kuepper – The Exotic Mail Order Moods of Ed Kuepper
    - TISM – "Greg! The Stop Sign!!"
    - Underground Lovers – Rushall Station
- Best Alternative Release
  - **Regurgitator – Tu-Plang**
    - Nick Cave and the Bad Seeds – Murder Ballads
    - Pollyanna – Long Player
    - Spiderbait – The Unfinished Spanish Galleon of Finley Lake
    - You Am I – Hourly, Daily
- Best Indigenous Release
  - **Christine Anu – "Come On"**
    - Kev Carmody – Images and Illusions
    - Blekbala Mujik – Blekbala Mujik
    - Various – Our Home, Our Land
    - Warumpi Band – Too Much Humbug
- Best Adult Contemporary Album
  - **John Farnham – Romeo's Heart**
    - Kate Ceberano – "Change"
    - Stephen Cummings – Escapist
    - Tommy Emmanuel – Classical Gas
    - Mick Harvey – Intoxicated Man
- Best Comedy Release
  - **Martin/Molloy – The Brown Album**
    - Austen Tayshus – I'm Jacques Chirac
    - Bucko & Champs – Aussie Christmas
    - Silverpram – Frogstamp
    - The Vaughans – "Who Farted?"

=== Fine Arts Awards ===
- Best Jazz Album
  - **Paul Grabowsky Trio – When Words Fail**
    - Bob Barnard – Live at the Sydney Opera House
    - Bob Bertles Quintet – Rhythm of the Heart
    - The Engine Room – Full Steam Ahead
    - Barney McAll – Exit
- Best Classical Album
  - **Australian Chamber Orchestra – Peter Sculthorpe: Music for Strings**
    - Australian Chamber Orchestra – Spirit
    - Australia Ensemble – Shostakovich
    - Macquarie Trio – Beethoven Piano Trios
    - Marshall McGuire – Awakening
- Best Children's Album
  - **The Wiggles – Wake Up Jeff!**
    - Bananas in Pyjamas – It's Singing Time!
    - Christine Hutchinson – The Grand Fairies' Ball
    - Gillian Eastoe – Gillian Eastoe's Extra Awesome Intergalactical Expedition Into The Far Reaches And Back
    - Peter Combe – Little Groover
- Best Original Soundtrack / Cast / Show Recording
  - **Australian Cast Recording – Beauty & the Beast**
    - Australian Cast Recording – The Secret Garden
    - Iva Davies – The Berlin Tapes
    - Cezary Skubiszewski – Lilian's Story
    - Nigel Westlake – Babe
- Best World Music Album
  - **Mara! – Rulno Vlno**
    - Cafe of the Gate of Salvation – A Window in Heaven
    - Dead Can Dance – Spiritchaser
    - Sirocco – Stars and Fires
    - Various – Womadelaide '95

=== Artisan Awards ===
- Song of the Year
  - **Nick Cave & Kylie Minogue – "Where the Wild Roses Grow"**
    - Tina Arena – "Wasn't It Good"
    - Tim Finn & Neil Finn – "Suffer Never"
    - Powderfinger – "Pick You Up"
    - Swoop – "Apple Eyes"
- Producer of the Year
  - **You Am I – You Am I – Hourly, Daily**
    - David Bridie – Monique Brumby – Fool for You
    - The Badloves, Doug Roberts – The Badloves – Holy Roadside
    - Magoo, Regurgitator – Regurgitator – Tu-Plang
    - Victor Vaughan – Dave Graney & the Coral Snakes – The Soft 'N Sexy Sound
- Engineer of the Year
  - **Paul McKercher, Wayne Connolly – You Am I – Hourly, Daily**
    - Doug Brady – John Farnham – Romeo's Heart
    - Chris Dickie - Six Mile High - "Homebaker", "Hallowed ground" / Header - "Restoration"
    - Magoo – Regurgitator – Tu-Plang
    - Tom Whitten – Powderfinger - "Pick You Up" / Automatic - Sister K / Bluebottle Kiss - Double Yellow Tarred
- Best Video
  - **Andrew Lancaster – You Am I – "Soldiers"**
    - Robbie Douglas-Turner – The Cruel Sea – "Too Fast for Me"
    - John Fransic – Swoop – "Apple Eyes"
    - John Hillcoat, Polly Borland – Frente! – "Sit on My Hands"
    - John Witteron – Hoodoo Gurus – "Waking up Tired"
- Best Cover Art
  - **Reg Mombassa – Mental As Anything – Liar Liar Pants on Fire**
    - Simon Anderson – You Am I – Hourly, Daily
    - Rockin' Doodles, Quan Yeomans, Ben Ely – Regurgitator – Tu-Plang
    - Janet English, George Stajsic – Spiderbait – The Unfinished Spanish Galleon of Finley Lake
    - Tony Mahoney – Dave Graney – The Soft 'N Sexy Sound

== Achievement awards ==
=== Outstanding Achievement Award ===
- Silverchair

=== Special Achievement Award ===
- Slim Dusty

== ARIA Hall of Fame inductees ==
The Hall of Fame inductees were:

- Australian Crawl
- Horrie Dargie
