= Wendy Cracked a Walnut (soundtrack) =

Wendy Cracked a Walnut: Original Soundtrack Recording

Soundtrack album by Bruce Smeaton
- Released: 1991 (1M1CD1007)
- Recorded: 1990
- Genre: Score
- Language: English
- Label: 1M1 Records
- Producer: Philip Powers

Wendy Cracked a Walnut: Original Soundtrack Recording is the soundtrack album from the 1990 Australian film Wendy Cracked a Walnut.

== Album information ==
This CD features music by the composer Bruce Smeaton.

== Reception ==
The soundtrack was well received by fans of Bruce Smeaton's music. His ground-breaking synthesized score for Wendy Cracked a Walnut's soundtrack was nominated for an ARIA Award in 1991 for Best Soundtrack / Cast / Show Album.

== Track listing ==
1. Opening Titles
2. Queen of Slink
3. Wendy Walnut
4. Move Them Feet
5. One Dark Night
6. Breathless
7. Closing Credits
8. Midnight Rainbow
9. Fax of Life
10. Antoine's
11. Love Is a Market
12. So Slow
13. That Sinking Feeling

== Credits ==
- Recording producers – Bruce Smeaton and Joe Chindamo
- Executive producer – Philip Powers
- Artwork – Bruce Bath
- Mastering – Meredith Brooks
