= Intoxication (The Habibis album) =

Studio album by The Habibis
- Released: 1998
- Label: Larrikin Records
- Producer: The Habibis

The Habibis chronology
Four Warriors (1995)	Intoxication (1998)	Selections 1995-2006 (2008)

Intoxication is the second and final studio album by Australian band, The Habibis. The album was released in 1998.

At the ARIA Music Awards of 1999, the album won the ARIA Award for Best World Music Album.

== Track listing ==
1. "My Red Apple"
2. "She Walked All Night Long"
3. "The Only Son"
4. "Thrash 5"
5. "Together (Rain or Shine)"
6. "I'll Break Cups"
7. "I Was Born to Suffer"
8. "The Sea"
9. "Yialitissa"
10. "At One With the Sea"
11. "How I'll Sigh"
12. "White Doves"
13. "Nightingale's Request"
14. "The 'Eleven'"
