= Doris & Me =

Studio album by Janet Seidel
- Released: 2001
- Studio: Paradise Studios
- Genre: Jazz
- Label: La Brava Music

Doris & Me is a 2000 cabaret show and 2001 soundtrack album by Janet Seidel. It is a tribute to Doris Day. Seidel sings and plays the piano and is accompanied by her brother David Seidel (bass) and later joined by Chuck Morgan (guitar). The album was nominated for the ARIA Music Award for Best Original Show/Cast Album in 2001.

== Tracklist ==
1. Somebody Loves Me/ Blue Skies
2. Sentimental Journey
3. Secret Love
4. I'll String Along With You
5. My Dreams Are Getting Better All The Time/ Let's Be Buddies/ I May Be Wrong
6. I've Got the Sun in the Morning
7. Embraceable You
8. It's Magic
9. Canadian Capers
10. Too Marvelous For Words
11. I Know That You Know
12. Crazy Rhythm
13. Tea For Two/ Do Do Do
14. The Very Thought of You
15. The Way You Look Tonight
16. Lullaby of Broadway
17. Love Me or Leave Me
18. Ten Cents a Dance
19. Close Your Eyes
20. Perhaps
21. Windy City
22. Pillow Talk/ Please Don't Eat the Daisies/ Teachers Pet
23. Que Sera Sera
24. Please Don't Talk About Me
