= Queensland Pops Orchestra =

Australian orchestra

Queensland Pops Orchestra is an Australian orchestra founded by Colin Harper

The Queensland Pops Orchestra had its first performance on the 31 December 1984 at the Lyric Theatre in South Brisbane, Queensland. This was also the first show at the Queensland Performing Arts Centre which officially opened in April 1985.

Shows put on by Queensland Pops Orchestra include the Vienna Pops series the Scotland the Brave series and the Best of British concerts.

The 2000 ABC Classics album release of highlights of one of their Scotland the Brave concerts was nominated for the 2001 ARIA Award for Best Cast or Show Album.

== Awards and nominations ==
=== ARIA Music Awards ===
The ARIA Music Awards is an annual awards ceremony held by the Australian Recording Industry Association. They commenced in 1987.

Year	Nominee / work	Award	Result	Ref.
2001	Scotland the Brave	Best Original Cast or Show Album	Nominated	
