= Elizabeth (soundtrack) =

Soundtrack album by David Hirschfelder
- Released: 1998
- Genre: Soundtrack
- Label: Gramercy Records

David Hirschfelder chronology
The Interview (1998)	Elizabeth (1998)	What Becomes of the Broken Hearted? (1999)

Elizabeth is the original soundtrack of the 1998 Academy Award and Golden Globe-winning film Elizabeth starring Cate Blanchett, Geoffrey Rush, Christopher Eccleston, Richard Attenborough and Joseph Fiennes. The original score was composed by David Hirschfelder.

The album won the BAFTA Award for Best Film Music and was nominated for the Academy Award for Best Original Dramatic Score (lost to the score of the film La vita è bella).

At the ARIA Music Awards of 1999 the soundtrack was won the ARIA Award for Best Original Soundtrack, Cast or Show Album.

Professional ratings
Review scores
Source	Rating
SoundtrackNet	link

== Track listing ==
No.	Title	Notes	Length
1.	"Elizabeth: Overture"		4:44
2.	"Love Theme - Arrest"		3:08
3.	"Tonight I Think I Die"		4:22
4.	"Walsingham"		2:05
5.	"Night of the Long Knives"	adapted from a composition by William Byrd	4:12
6.	"Coronation Banquet"		6:34
7.	"Love Theme"		1:48
8.	"Aftermath"		5:19
9.	"Parliament"		4:08
10.	"Rondes"	from Tielman Susato (1500-1561) 'Dansereye' Rondes I and VII	4:32
11.	"Conspiracy"		3:21
12.	"Ballard"		3:53
13.	"One Mistress, No Master"		4:25
14.	"Nimrod"	from Enigma Variations by Edward Elgar (Soprano - Kim Wheeler)	4:30
15.	"Requiem"	by Mozart (Soprano - Kim Wheeler)	5:10
Total length:			62:11
