= Colin Harper (conductor) =

- Born: c. 1933; Fort George, Scotland
- Origin: Australia
- Died: 2004
- Formerly of: Queensland Pops Orchestra

Colin Harper AM MBE (c. 1933 – 2004) was a Scottish Australian conductor and the founder of the Queensland Pops Orchestra.

Harper was born in Fort George in Scotland. He joined the Army when he was 14 and later became the bandmaster of Gordon Highlander regiment. He moved to Australia in 1972 and became the music director of the Fifth Military District band in Perth. 1981 saw him move to Brisbane where in 1984 he founded the Queensland Pops Orchestra who put on series of The Best of British and Scotland the Brave concerts. Harper died in January 2004 from cancer.

The 2000 ABC Classics album release of highlights of one of his Scotland the Brave concerts was nominated for the 2001 ARIA Award for Best Cast or Show Album.

== Awards and nominations ==
=== ARIA Music Awards ===
The ARIA Music Awards is an annual awards ceremony held by the Australian Recording Industry Association. They commenced in 1987.

Year	Nominee / work	Award	Result	Ref.
2001	Scotland the Brave	Best Original Cast or Show Album	Nominated	
