= Bruce Smeaton =

Australian composer (born 1938)

- Born: 5 March 1938 (age 88); Brighton, Victoria, Australia
- Occupation: Composer
- Years active: 1973–present
- Spouse(s): Helen Telford (former); Mary Smeaton (current)
- Children: 3

Bruce Smeaton (born 5 March 1938) is an Australian composer who is well known for a variety of Australian film and television scores in all genres, including features, shorts, television, documentaries and advertisements. His scores include Picnic at Hanging Rock, Seven Little Australians, Roxanne, Iceman, and Circle of Iron. He has won the Australian Film Institute (AFI) Best Original Music Score award for The Cars That Ate Paris (1974), The Great Macarthy (1975), The Chant of Jimmie Blacksmith (1978) and Street Hero (1984, shared with Garth Porter and others).

== Biography ==
Smeaton was born in Brighton, Victoria. His music has been championed by the Southern Cross Records and 1M1 Records labels.

In 1964, he spent time as a public school music teacher, at Fawkner Technical School (then an all-boys school) in the Moomba Park area of North Fawkner, a suburb of Melbourne. At the time he had a passionate interest in vintage cars which he would often bring to school.

His ground-breaking synthesized score for Wendy Cracked a Walnut was nominated for an ARIA Award in 1991 for Best Soundtrack / Cast / Show Album.

He currently lives in Binalong, New South Wales. He has been married twice and has three adult children.

== Filmography ==
=== Documentaries ===
- Bush, Books and Breedens (1973)
- My Brother Wartovo (1973)
- Kangaroo Island (1974)
- Pozieres (2000)

=== Feature films ===
- Libido (1973)
- The Cars That Ate Paris (1974)
- Picnic at Hanging Rock (1975)
- The Great Macarthy (1975)
- The Devil's Playground (1976)
- The Trespassers (1976)
- Eliza Fraser a.k.a. The Adventures of Eliza Fraser (1976)
- Summerfield (1977)
- The Chant of Jimmie Blacksmith (1978)
- Circle of Iron a.k.a. The Silent Flute (1978)
- The Last of the Knucklemen (1979)
- Grendel Grendel Grendel (1980)
- ...Maybe This Time (1980)
- Double Deal (1981)
- Monkey Grip (1982)
- Squizzy Taylor (1982)
- Barbarosa (1982)
- Undercover (1983)
- Iceman (1984)
- The Naked Country (1984)
- Departure (1985)
- Plenty (1985)
- Eleni (1985)
- Contagion (1987)
- Roxanne (1987)
- Evil Angels a.k.a. A Cry in the Dark (1988)
- Wendy Cracked a Walnut aka Almost (1989)
- The Missing (1999)

=== Short films ===
- The Clown and the Mindreader (n.d.)

=== Television shows ===
- Seven Little Australians (1973, TV miniseries)
- Ben Hall (1975, TV series)
- Tandarra (1976, miniseries)
- Patrol Boat (1979, TV series)
- The Timeless Land (1980, TV miniseries)
- A Town Like Alice (1981, TV miniseries)
- 1915 (1982, miniseries)
- Five Mile Creek (1983, TV series)
- The Coral Island (1983, TV miniseries)
- Eureka Stockade (1984, TV miniseries)
- Boy in the Bush (1984, TV miniseries)
- A Thousand Skies (1986, TV miniseries)
- Jackson's Crew (1986, pilot)
- Tusitala (1986, TV miniseries)
- The Alien Years (1988, TV miniseries)
- Act of Betrayal (1988, movie)
- Naked Under Capricorn (1989, movie)
- The Private War of Lucinda Smith (1990, dramatised documentary)
- The Last of the Ryans (1997, movie)

== Awards and nominations ==
=== ARIA Music Awards ===
The ARIA Music Awards is an annual awards ceremony held by the Australian Recording Industry Association. They commenced in 1987.

Year	Nominee / work	Award	Result	Ref.
1991	Wendy Cracked a Walnut	Best Original Soundtrack, Cast or Show Album	Nominated	
