= Deone Zanotto =

Australian actress, singer and dancer

Deone Zanotto is an Australian actress, singer and dancer. She has appeared on stage in musicals such as West Side Story, Mack and Mabel, Footloose, Like Me.

Along with Ben Mingay she was nominated for the 2005 ARIA Award for Best Original Soundtrack, Cast or Show Album for Dirty Dancing - The Classic Story on Stage.

== Awards and nominations ==
=== ARIA Music Awards ===
The ARIA Music Awards is an annual awards ceremony held by the Australian Recording Industry Association. They commenced in 1987.

Year	Nominee / work	Award	Result	Ref.
2005	Dirty Dancing - The Classic Story on Stage (with Ben Mingay)	Best Original Cast or Show Album	Nominated	
