= Philip Powers =

Australian record producer

- Born: Philip Powers; 1963 (age 62–63); Bankstown, Sydney, Australia
- Occupations: Record Producer, Composer and Author
- Years active: 1979-present
- Spouse: Alison Robards (m. 2008)
- Children: 2

Philip Powers (born 1963) is a record producer - and author - specialising in film scores and classical music. His recordings have been nominated for five ARIA Awards. He has produced 34 CDs for the 1M1 Records label including The Lighthorsemen and The Coolangatta Gold. He also produced or executive produced more than 50 CDs for the Sydney Symphony Orchestra on Sydney Symphony Live and other labels. A number of these have been with the conductor Vladimir Ashkenazy as well as two CDs with the conductor Gianluigi Gelmetti. Another CD featured Vladimir Ashkenazy as pianist playing rare Rachmaninov works. He was the supervising producer of Sir Charles Mackerras, a double CD featuring famous Czech repertoire and Richard Strauss' Also sprach Zarathustra conducted by Sir Charles Mackerras.

== Career ==
=== Scores ===
After graduating from University of New South Wales having acted in the position of Music Officer for several months in 1984, he was appointed Director of Music for Film Australia in 1986. Between 1983 and 1988 he was responsible for the music in over 200 Film Australia productions, including Cane Toads. He worked with Gillian Armstrong and Jane Campion on Bingo, Bridesmaids and Braces and After Hours. He supervised the musical and choreographed sequences in Academy Award-winning director Bruce Petty's The Movers and was the recording producer of the AFI 1984 Best Film Winner Annie's Coming Out which was also nominated for Best Original Music Score, losing to Bruce Smeaton and Garth Porter for Streethero. 18 years later he released the Original Soundtrack Recording on his 1M1 Records label.

He produced his first CDs of film scores for the Southern Cross label in 1988, working with Simon Walker on The Wild Duck and Brian May on Frog Dreaming as well as Tony Bremner on The Everlasting Secret Family.

Other notable film scores he produced for CD from classic Australian feature films include Robbery Under Arms, The Lighthorsemen, We of the Never Never, The Flying Doctors, Road Games, Patrick, Harlequin, Snapshot, Sky Pirates, Thirst, Devil in the Flesh, Caddie, beDevil, Eliza Fraser and The Coolangatta Gold. Additionally, he produced the CD of Nigel Westlake's score for the four-part television documentary series, The Celluloid Heroes.

He also wrote and produced the scores for a number of plays, documentaries, shorts and animated films. He has also written classical music for orchestra, synthesizers and piano as well as a trio for violin, cello and percussion.

Ironbark Bill (1985) is a 5-episode TV short and a feature short animated film narrated by John Clarke. It played in cinemas in Australia as the animated short before the films Santa Clause (1985) and Crocodile Dundee (1986). "Town Under Threat" is a documentary (which screened on Channel 7's The World Around Us) about the threat of a potentially devastating exploding volcano in Rabaul. "Don't be the Last to Know" is a documentary about the pervading threat of drugs to children in the mid-1980s in Australia, presented by Michael Willesee. "Let 'em Vote" and "Saturday Saturday" were training films for elections in the 1980s. "Combat Zone" was a classified training film for the army in the series, War Administration.

In addition to these were films about accounting for a multicultural society, "The Investigation", the supernatural drama, "The Traveller's Tale", and a documentary produced by Anthony Buckley about the famous Gulflander train (narrated by Bill Peach) which ran from Croydon to Normanton.

=== Other classical productions ===
His work with the Sydney Symphony Orchestra began in 2008 as recording manager, the year before Vladimir Ashkenazy began his five-year tenure as chief conductor. Together they recorded eight CDs of music by Elgar and Prokofiev, with all the symphonies and piano concertos; and in the following three years they collaborated with the Japanese label Exton, and produced another 10 CDs of all of Mahler's symphonies.

In 2014, he accepted a new contract with the orchestra to produce concerts as live webstreams and for video-on-demand.

Other notable releases include contemporary classical music of Elision and a CD with Simon Walker, Guy Gross, Chris Neal and Mark Isaacs on the Music for Pianos, Percussion and Synthesizers CD, which also featured his own work, "Wired".

In 2016, the recording he produced of "Josh Pyke with the SSO" received an ARIA Award.

In 2017, Powers produced two concerts for Foxtel for the SSO, directed a film of the performance of "In Paradisum" by the Sydney Youth Orchestra of a work by George Palmer, and produced four new recordings.

=== Author ===
In 2020 Powers wrote “Black and White: Sidney Poitier's Emergence in the 1960s as a Black Icon”.

== Critical reception ==
Roger Covell, chief classical music critic for The Sydney Morning Herald, wrote in his 1990 review of the CD, "Simon Walker's Binary has a feeling of severity and power to it; Philip Powers, producer of the disc and its animating spirit, inevitably calls to mind a degree of filmic spookiness with his use of almost-human wails and sighs from electronic sources in his inventive Wired." The article finished with praise for the concept album, Covell writing, "[t]he disc is a useful message from composers who are in the process of working out their place in Australian music. More messages of a similar kind would be welcome."

The Australian Recording Industry Association nominated Powers and the 1M1 label for five ARIA awards: Bloodmoon, Wendy Cracked a Walnut, beDevil and the highly regarded Christ Church St Laurence Choir CD Victoria.

== Classical releases as executive producer or producer ==
Year	Composer	Work	Artists	Label	Sessions	CD Producer
2015	Antonio Vivaldi	The Four Seasons	James Ehnes / Sydney Symphony Orchestra	SSO Live	Producer	check
2014	Josh Pyke	Josh Pyke - Live with the SSO	Christopher Dragon / Josh Pyke / Sydney Symphony Orchestra	ABC Classics	Producer	check
2014	Gustav Holst	The Planets	David Robertson / Sydney Symphony Orchestra	SSO Live	Co-Prod	check
2013	Igor Stravinsky	The Firebird (2008 Performance)	David Robertson / Sydney Symphony Orchestra	SSO Live	☒	check
2013	Gustav Mahler	Das lied von de erde (ABC Archival Recording)	Sydney Symphony Orchestra	SSO Live	☒	check
2013	Gustav Mahler	Kindertotenlieder (ABC Archival Recording)	Sydney Symphony Orchestra	SSO Live	☒	check
2013	Gustav Mahler	Rückert-Lieder (ABC Archival Recording)	Sydney Symphony Orchestra	SSO Live	☒	check
2013	Pyotr Tchaikovsky	Piano Concerto No. 2 in G, Op.44	Vladimir Ashkenazy / Garrick Ohlsson / Sydney Symphony Orchestra	SSO Live	Producer	check
2013	Nigel Westlake & Lior	Compassion	Nigel Westlake / Lior / Sydney Symphony Orchestra	ABC Classics	Exec. Producer	☒
2012	Ross Edwards	Saxophone Concerto (Full Moon Dances)	Miguel Harth-Bedoya / Amy Dickson / Sydney Symphony Orchestra	ABC Classics	Exec. Producer	☒
2012	Brett Dean	The Siduri Dances	Benjamin Northey / Amy Dickson / Sydney Symphony Orchestra	ABC Classics	Sup. Prod	☒
2012	Peter Sculthorpe	Island Songs	Benjamin Northey / Amy Dickson / Sydney Symphony Orchestra	ABC Classics	Sup. Prod	☒
2011	Gustav Mahler	Symphony No. 6	Vladimir Ashkenazy / Sydney Symphony Orchestra	SSO Live	Exec. Producer	check
2011	Gustav Mahler	Symphony No. 7	Vladimir Ashkenazy / Sydney Symphony Orchestra	SSO Live	Exec. Producer	check
2011	Gustav Mahler	Symphony No. 9	Vladimir Ashkenazy / Sydney Symphony Orchestra	SSO Live	Exec. Producer	check
2011	Gustav Mahler	Symphony No. 10 (Barshai Edition)	Vladimir Ashkenazy / Sydney Symphony Orchestra	SSO Live	Exec. Producer	check
2011	Gustav Mahler	Symphony No. 2 in C minor Resurrection	Vladimir Ashkenazy / Matthews, DeYoung, Sydney Phil Choirs / Sydney Symphony Orchestra	SSO Live / Exton	Exec. Producer	check
2011	Brett Dean	Violin Concerto - The Lost Art of Letter Writing	Jonathn Nott / Frank Peter Zimmermann / Sydney Symphony Orchestra	BIS / SSO Live	Exec. Producer	check
2009-2011	Sergei Prokofiev	Romeo and Juliet ballet (complete)	Vladimir Ashkenazy / Sydney Symphony Orchestra	SSO Live	Co-Prod	check
2010	Pyotr Tchaikovsky	Violin Concerto in D, Op.35	Vladimir Ashkenazy / James Ehnes / Sydney Symphony Orchestra	SSO Live	Exec. Producer	check
2010	Pyotr Tchaikovsky	Souvenir d'un Lieu Cher, Op. 42: I. Méditation II. Scherzo III. Mélodie	Vladimir Ashkenazy (piano) / James Ehnes (violin)	SSO Live / Onyx Classics	Exec. Producer	check
2010	Pyotr Tchaikovsky	Sérénade mélancolique, Op. 26	Vladimir Ashkenazy / James Ehnes / Sydney Symphony Orchestra	SSO Live / Onyx Classics	Exec. Producer	check
2010	Pyotr Tchaikovsky	Valse-Scherzo for Violin and Orchestra in C, Op. 34	Vladimir Ashkenazy / James Ehnes / Sydney Symphony Orchestra	SSO Live / Onyx Classics	Exec. Producer	check
2010	Vaughan Williams	Flos Campi	Vladimir Ashkenazy / Sydney Symphony Orchestra	Melba [Aust]	Exec. Producer	☒
2010	Vaughan Williams	The Lark Ascending	Vladimir Ashkenazy / Sydney Symphony Orchestra	Melba [Aust]	Exec. Producer	☒
2010	Benjamin Britten	Sinfonia da Requiem	Vladimir Ashkenazy / Sydney Symphony Orchestra	Melba [Aust]	Exec. Producer	☒
2010	Carl W. Stalling and Milt Franklyn	Bugs Bunny at the Symphony	George Daugherty / Sydney Symphony Orchestra	Watertower Music	Exec. Producer	☒
2010	Gustav Mahler	Symphony No. 1	Vladimir Ashkenazy / Sydney Symphony Orchestra	Exton	Exec. Producer	check
2010	Gustav Mahler	Symphony No. 3 in D minor	Vladimir Ashkenazy / Sydney Symphony Orchestra	SSO Live / Exton	Exec. Producer	check
2010	Gustav Mahler	Symphony No. 4	Vladimir Ashkenazy / Sydney Symphony Orchestra	SSO Live	Exec. Producer	check
2010	Gustav Mahler	Symphony No. 5	Vladimir Ashkenazy / Sydney Symphony Orchestra	Exton / SSO Live	Exec. Producer	check
2010	Gustav Mahler	Symphony No. 8 in E-flat major Symphony of a Thousand	Vladimir Ashkenazy / Adelaide Symphony Chorus Gondwana Voices Sydney Children's Choir Sydney Phil Choirs WASO Chorus / Sydney Symphony Orchestra	Exton / SSO Live	Exec. Producer	check
2010	Gustav Mahler	Das lied von de erde	Vladimir Ashkenazy / Stuart Skelton Lilli Paasikivi / Sydney Symphony Orchestra	Exton / SSO Live	Exec. Producer	check
2009	Sergei Rachmaninoff	Rare Rachmaninoff	Vladimir Ashkenazy / Goldner String Quartet	SSO Live	Exec. Producer	check
2009	Sergei Prokofiev	Symphony No. 1	Vladimir Ashkenazy / Sydney Symphony Orchestra	SSO Live / Exton	Exec. Producer	☒
2009	Sergei Prokofiev	Symphony No. 2	Vladimir Ashkenazy / Sydney Symphony Orchestra	Exton	Exec. Producer	☒
2009	Sergei Prokofiev	Symphony No. 3	Vladimir Ashkenazy / Sydney Symphony Orchestra	Exton	Exec. Producer	☒
2009	Sergei Prokofiev	Symphony No. 4	Vladimir Ashkenazy / Sydney Symphony Orchestra	Exton	Exec. Producer	☒
2009	Sergei Prokofiev	Symphony No. 5	Vladimir Ashkenazy / Sydney Symphony Orchestra	Exton	Exec. Producer	☒
2009	Sergei Prokofiev	Symphony No. 6	Vladimir Ashkenazy / Sydney Symphony Orchestra	Exton	Exec. Producer	☒
2009	Sergei Prokofiev	Symphony No. 7	Vladimir Ashkenazy / Sydney Symphony Orchestra	Exton	Exec. Producer	☒
2009	Sergei Prokofiev	Lt. Kije Ugly Duckling Love of Three Oranges	Vladimir Ashkenazy / Sydney Symphony Orchestra	Exton	Exec. Producer	☒
2009	Sergei Prokofiev	Piano Concerto No. 1 In D-flat Major Op. 10 (1912)	Vladimir Ashkenazy / Alexander Gavrylyuk / Sydney Symphony Orchestra	Exton	Exec. Producer	☒
2009	Sergei Prokofiev	Piano Concerto No. 2 In G Minor Op. 16 (1913)	Vladimir Ashkenazy / Alexander Gavrylyuk / Sydney Symphony Orchestra	Exton	Exec. Producer	☒
2009	Sergei Prokofiev	Piano Concerto No. 3 in C major Op.26 (1921)	Vladimir Ashkenazy / Alexander Gavrylyuk / Sydney Symphony Orchestra	Exton	Exec. Producer	☒
2009	Sergei Prokofiev	Piano Concerto No. 4 In B-flat Major Op. 53 (1931) Left Hand	Vladimir Ashkenazy / Alexander Gavrylyuk / Sydney Symphony Orchestra	Exton	Exec. Producer	☒
2009	Sergei Prokofiev	Piano Concerto No. 5 in G major Op.55 (1932)	Vladimir Ashkenazy / Alexander Gavrylyuk / Sydney Symphony Orchestra	Exton	Exec. Producer	☒
2009	Sergei Prokofiev	Peter and the Wolf	Vladimir Ashkenazy / John Bell (narrator) / Sydney Symphony Orchestra	Exton	Exec. Producer	☒
2008	Vaughan Williams	The Dream of Gerontius	Vladimir Ashkenazy / Sydney Symphony Orchestra	Universal	Exec. Producer	☒
2008	Edward Elgar	Cello Concerto in E minor, Op.85	Vladimir Ashkenazy (cond.) / Jian Wang (soloist) / Sydney Symphony Orchestra	Universal	Exec. Producer	☒
2008	Gianluigi Gelmetti	Song of Life (Cantata della vita)	Gianluigi Gelmetti (cond.) / Sydney Symphony Orchestra	SSO Live	Exec. Producer	check
2008	Benjamin Britten	The Young Person's Guide to the Orchestra	Benjamin Northey / Sydney Symphony Orchestra	ABC Classics	Exec. Producer	☒
2008	Maurice Ravel	Mother Goose suite	Benjamin Northey / Sydney Symphony Orchestra	ABC Classics	Exec. Producer	☒
2008	Edward Elgar	Pomp and Circumstance March No. 1 in D major, Op. 39 No. 1	Vladimir Ashkenazy / Sydney Symphony Orchestra	Exton	Exec. Producer	☒
2008	Edward Elgar	Pomp and Circumstance March No. 2 in A minor, Op. 39 No. 2	Vladimir Ashkenazy / Sydney Symphony Orchestra	Exton	Exec. Producer	☒
2008	Edward Elgar	Pomp and Circumstance March No. 3 in C minor, Op. 39 No. 3	Vladimir Ashkenazy / Sydney Symphony Orchestra	Exton	Exec. Producer	☒
2008	Edward Elgar	Pomp and Circumstance March No. 4 in G major, Op. 39 No. 4	Vladimir Ashkenazy / Sydney Symphony Orchestra	Exton	Exec. Producer	☒
2008	Edward Elgar	Pomp and Circumstance March No. 5 in C major, Op. 39 No. 5	Vladimir Ashkenazy / Sydney Symphony Orchestra	Exton	Exec. Producer	☒
2008	Edward Elgar	Pomp and Circumstance March No. 6 in G minor (elab. Payne)	Vladimir Ashkenazy / Sydney Symphony Orchestra	Exton	Exec. Producer	☒
2008	Edward Elgar	Symphony No. 1	Vladimir Ashkenazy / Sydney Symphony Orchestra	Exton	Exec. Producer	☒
2008	Edward Elgar	Symphony No. 2	Vladimir Ashkenazy / Sydney Symphony Orchestra	Exton	Exec. Producer	☒
2008	Edward Elgar	Variations on an Original Theme, Op. 36 Enigma	Vladimir Ashkenazy / Sydney Symphony Orchestra	Exton	Exec. Producer	☒
2008	Edward Elgar	In the South (Alassio), Concert Overture, Op. 50	Vladimir Ashkenazy / Sydney Symphony Orchestra	Exton	Exec. Producer	☒
2008	Richard Strauss	Thus Sprach Zarathustra	Charles Mackerras / Sydney Symphony Orchestra	SSO Live	☒	check
2008	Antonín Dvořák	Symphony No. 7 in D Minor, Op. 70 B141	Charles Mackerras / Sydney Symphony Orchestra	SSO Live	☒	check
2008	Bedřich Smetana	Vltava (The Moldau)	Charles Mackerras / Sydney Symphony Orchestra	SSO Live	☒	check
2008	Leoš Janáček	Sinfonietta	Charles Mackerras / Sydney Symphony Orchestra	SSO Live	☒	check
2008	Johannes Brahms	Symphony No. 1	Gianluigi Gelmtti / Sydney Symphony Orchestra	SSO Live	☒	check
