= The Choir (film) =

2008 documentary film

- Directed by: Michael Davie
- Written by: Michael Davie
- Produced by: Michael Davie; Chris Hilton
- Starring: Jabulani Shabangu; Coleman Mgogodio
- Cinematography: Carlos Carvalho; Michael Davie
- Edited by: Ben Deacon; David Lourie; Karin Steininger
- Music by: Felicity Fox
- Release date: 2008
- Running time: 88 minutes
- Country: Australia
- Language: English

The Choir is a 2008 documentary film directed by Michael Davie. It profiles a choir in Leeuwkop Prison, near Johannesburg, following one prisoner over a four year period.

== Reception ==
Variety's Russell Edwards writes "Paradoxical images of hardened criminals with voices like angels are uplifting from the outset, but Zimbabwe-born helmer, Michael Davie transcends feel-good shortcuts to unblinkingly explore convicts’ lives. " The Manawatu Standard's Peter Lampp gave it 3 stars and finishes "Anyone with a trace of humanity will emerge from The Choir with a lump in their throat and an appreciation for our simple luxuries. That African chanting and dancing grows on you, too." Writing for the Age Philippa Hawker gave it 3 1/2 stars saying "THE Choir is a testimony to the redemptive power of song, but it is a thoughtful film that does not take this potential for granted." Leigh Paatsch of the Herald Sun gave it 4 stars and finishes "In spite of the sweet sounds that dominate here, The Choir is resolutely tough stuff from start to finish.."

== Awards ==
- 2009 Australian Film Institute Awards
  - Best Direction in a Documentary - Michael Davie - won
  - Best Sound in a Documentary - Sam Hayward, Phil Judd, Felicity Fox, Alli Heynes, Phil Vail, David White - nominated
  - Best Documentary - Chris Hilton, Michael Davie - nominated
