= Back to Before =

Soundtrack album by Judi Connelli
- Released: 2001
- Label: ABC Classics

Back to Before is a 2001 autobiographical cabaret show and soundtrack album (subtitled A Life in Song) by Judi Connelli. It features songs from shows she has performed over her career. She previewed the show in Victorian and NSW country towns before opening it at the New York Town Hall.

The album was nominated for the ARIA Music Award for Best Original Show/Cast Album in 2002.

== Track listing ==
1. Journey to the Past
2. Child in Me Again
3. Welcome To the Theater / That Halloween
4. Sunrise, Sunrise
5. Song on the Sand
6. When You're Good to Mama
7. As If We Never Said Goodbye
8. An Old-Fashioned Love Story
9. Could I Leave You
10. I'll Imagine You a Song
11. As Time Goes By
12. Some Enchanted Evening
13. I Don't Want to Know
14. Everything Must Change
15. Back to Before
16. Rose's Turn
