= Afrika - Cape Town to Cairo =

Australian documentary series (1998)

- Written by: Michael Davie; Marcus Gillezeau
- Directed by: Michael Davie
- Presented by: Michael Davie
- Composer: Felicity Fox
- Country of origin: Australia
- Original language: English
- No. of seasons: 1
- No. of episodes: 4

Production
- Executive producer: Geoff Barnes
- Producers: Ellenor Cox; Marcus Gillezeau
- Editor: Keith Lynch
- Running time: 25 minutes

Original release
- Network: ABC
- Release: 19 November – 10 December 1998

Afrika - Cape Town to Cairo was an Australian documentary series created by Michael Davie and broadcast by the ABC in 1998. The four episode series followed Davie as he travelled from Cape Town to Cairo On his travels he documented police brutality, street kids, homeless prostitutes, land mine victims, drugs, human right abuses and teen millionaires. Davie, who was born in Zimbabwe, shot it over seven months on a lightweight digital camera.

The Courier Mail's L Haas says the episodes are "so bursting with energy, passion and unexpected turns, it is immediately and totally addictive." Bruce Elder from The Sydney Morning Herald called it "This is a wonderful combination of investigative journalism (during the journey he exposes the plight of street kids in Bulawayo and the Tanzanian Government's involvement in the heroin trade) and old-style. "what will happen next", adventure travelling." The series won the Best Local Infotainment/Entertainment category in The Sydney Morning Herald's 1998 Couch Potato Awards where Elder declared "The winner, because journalists are suckers for innovation combined with oodles of youthful craziness and bravado. was Michael Davie's extraordinary series Afrika: Cape Town to Cairo."

The series soundtrack album Afrika: Cape Town To Cairo, by Felicity Fox, was nominated for the ARIA Music Award for Best Original Soundtrack Album in 1999.

== Episodes ==
1. Warriors and Witchdoctors
2. Home is Where the Landmines Are
3. Slobs in Paradise
4. Delinquents, Tribes and Millionaires
