= Jennifer McGregor (soprano) =

Australian operatic soprano

Jennifer McGregor is an Australian operatic soprano. Her album The Jennifer McGregor Album, recorded with the West Australian Symphony Orchestra, was nominated for the 1988 ARIA Award for Best Classical Album.

Born in Sydney, she is the sister of actress Julie McGregor. She joined the chorus of the Australian Opera in 1981 and became a principal after winning the Metropolitan Opera Audition Scholarship and the Armstrong-Martin Scholarship and studying in Europe. She left the opera in 1986. From 1988 to 1990 she was a principal with Germany's Heidelberg Opera. Together with Judi Connelli and Suzanne Johnston she formed the 3 Divas. In 2000 they released a self-titled album.

== Discography ==
=== Albums ===
List of albums, with selected details
Title	Details
The Jennifer McGregor Album	Released: 1988; Format: LP; Label: CBS (462793 1)

== Awards and nominations ==
=== ARIA Music Awards ===
The ARIA Music Awards is an annual awards ceremony held by the Australian Recording Industry Association. They commenced in 1987.

Year	Nominee / work	Award	Result	Ref.
1989	The Jennifer McGregor Album	Best Classical Album	Nominated	
