= Robyn Archer =

Australian singer and writer (born 1948)

Robyn Archer AO, CdOAL
- Born: Robyn Smith; 1948 (age 77–78); Prospect, South Australia
- Occupations: Singer-songwriter, festival director
- Website: RobynArcher.com

Robyn Archer, AO, CdOAL (born 1948) is an Australian singer, writer, stage director, artistic director, and public advocate of the arts, in Australia and internationally.

== Biography ==
Archer was born Robyn Smith in Prospect, South Australia. She began singing at the age of four years and was singing professionally from the age of 12 years, everything from folk and pop and graduating to blues, rock, jazz and cabaret. She graduated from the University of Adelaide and immediately took up a full-time singing career. Archer has a Bachelor of Arts degree (Honours English) and Diploma of Education from the University of Adelaide.

Archer is gay.

Robyn Archer is the subject of several pieces now housed in the Australian National Portrait Gallery, in particular an oil painting by George Gittoes was donated to the collection in 2012.

== Performance ==
In 1974, Archer sang Annie I in the Australian premiere of Brecht/Weill's The Seven Deadly Sins to open The Space of the Adelaide Festival Centre. She subsequently played Jenny in Kurt Weill's Threepenny Opera for New Opera South Australia where she met English translator and editor John Willett. Since then her name has been linked particularly with the German cabaret songs of Weill, Eisler, and Paul Dessau and others from the Weimar Republic, a repertoire that Willett guided her to.

Her one-woman cabaret A Star is Torn (1979) covering various female singers including Billie Holiday and her 1981 show The Pack of Women both became successful books and recordings, the latter also being produced for television in 1986. She played A Star is Torn throughout Australia from 1979 to 1983, and for a year at Wyndham's Theatre in London's West End.

Archer has continued to sing a wide-ranging repertoire and in 2008/2009 gave a series of concerts including iprotest! (with Paul Grabowsky) and separate German and French concerts with Michael Morley. All were sell-outs and critically acclaimed.

Robyn has written and devised many works for the stage from The Conquest of Carmen Miranda to Songs From Sideshow Alley and Cafe Fledermaus (directed by Barrie Kosky to open the Merlyn Theatre at the Malthouse in Melbourne). In 1989 she was commissioned to write a new opera, Mambo, for the Nexus Opera, London. In 2008 her play Architektin premiered in Adelaide and in 2009 she devised the Tough Nut Cabaret for a production in Pittsburgh, USA.

== Festival director and public speaker ==
Robyn Archer is also a director of arts festivals in Australia and overseas. Her career took this turn accidentally, with an invitation while she was performing her show Le Chat Noir in Canberra to direct the National Festival of Australian Theatre which was hosted by the national capital. She directed the 1993, 1994 and 1995 editions and this began a string of Artistic Director positions at the Adelaide Festival of Arts (1998 and 2000), the Melbourne International Arts Festival (2002–2004). She created Ten Days on the Island, an international arts festival for Tasmania, spent two years as Artistic Director of the European Capital of Culture, and advised on the start-up of Luminato in Toronto. In 2007 she created The Light in Winter for Federation Square in Melbourne and in July 2009 was appointed Creative Director of the Centenary of Canberra 2013.

She is in frequent demand as a speaker and public advocate of the arts all over the world, and her Wal Cherry and Manning Clark Memorial Lectures in 2008/2009 have increased that status. She was a commentator at the inaugural broadcast Sydney Gay and Lesbian Mardi Gras for the ABC, Australia. She has been a television guest on The Michael Parkinson Show, Clive James at Home, Good News Week (ABC); Adelaide Festival 1998 (ABC National three-part series), the David Frost New Year Special, The Midday Show, Tonight Live, Review, Dateline, Denton, and Express.

On 1 April 2016, Robyn Archer AO was inducted into the South Australian Music Hall of Fame.

== Discography ==
=== Albums ===
List of albums, with selected details
Title	Details
Take Your Partners for... The Ladies Choice	Released: 1977; Format: LP; Label: Slater Sound Studios (RA-001)
The Wild Girl in the Heart	Released: 1978; Format: LP; Label: Larrikin Records (LRF-027)
Tonight: Lola Blau	Released: 1980; Format: LP; Label: Trafalgar Records (ARM 5001)
A Star is Torn	Released: 1980; Format: LP; Label: Trafalgar Records (ARM 5002)
Rough As Guts	Released: 1981; Format: 2×LP; Label: Armada Records (ARM 5003/4); Note: live recording
Robyn Archer Sings Brecht (with The London Sinfonietta & Dominic Muldowney)	Released: 1981; Format: LP; Label: EMI (ASD 4166); Reissued as Songs for Bad Times 1
Robyn Archer Sings Brecht Volume Two (with The London Sinfonietta & Dominic Muldowney)	Released: 1984; Format: LP; Label: EMI (EL 2700491); Reissued as Songs for Bad Times 2
The Pack of Women	Released: 1986; Format: LP, CD, Cass; Label: ABC Records (L 38639); Soundtrack to The Pack of Women
Mrs. Bottle's (Absolutely Blurtingly Beautiful World-Beating) Burp	Released: 1990; Format: LP, CD; Label: ABC Records (846 218-2)
Ancient Warriors	Released: 1993; Format: CD; Label: Larrikin Records (LRF 276)
Keep Up Your Standards! (with Paul Grabowsky)	Released: 1997; Format: CD; Label: Larrikin Records (LRF483)
Classic Cabaret Rarities	Released: 2019; Format: Digital; Label: Rouseabout Records (RRR91)

== Videography ==
Eating on the Plane (ABC for Kids film clip, 1990) (appeared on ABC for Kids: Video Hits from 1991) (Director: Tony Wellington; Producer: Vicki Watson)

== Works ==
=== Stage works as writer, composer or devisor ===
- Live-Could-Possibly-Be-True-One-Day Adventures of Superwoman (1974)
- Kold Komfort Kaffe (1978)
- A Star Is Torn (1979)
- Songs from Sideshow Alley (1980)
- Captain Lazar and his Earthbound Circus (1980)
- The Pack of Women (1981)
- The Conquest of Carmen Miranda (1982)
- Cut and Thrust (1983)
- Il Magnifico (1984)
- The 1985 Scandals (1985)
- Akwanso, Fly South (1988)
- Cafe Fledermaus (1990)
- Mrs Bottle's Absolutely Blurtingly Beautiful World Beating Burp (1990)
- Le Chat Noir (1991)
- The Bridge (1992)
- See Ya Next Century (1993)
- Ningali (1994)
- Sappho Sings the Blues (1997)
- Boy Hamlet (2000)
- Architektin (2008)

=== Other published works ===
- The Robyn Archer Songbook (McPhee Gribble, 1980)
- Mrs Bottle Burps (Nelson, 1983)
- 'Introduction', Women's Role (The National Times, 1983)
- The myth of the mainstream: politics and performing arts in Australia today (Platform paper no. 4) (Currency House, 2005)
- Detritus: addressing culture & the arts (UWA Publishing, 2010)

== Positions ==
=== Current positions held ===
- Creative Director, Centenary of Canberra
- Artistic Director, The Light in Winter (Federation Square, Melbourne)
- Member, European House of Culture
- Co-patron, The Institute of Postcolonial Studies (Melbourne)
- Patron, The Arts Law Centre of Australia
- Patron, The National Script Centre (Tasmania)
- Patron, Brink Productions (Adelaide)
- Patron, The Australian Art Orchestra (Melbourne)
- Ambassador, the Adelaide Crows
- Ambassador, The International Women's Development Agency
- RMIT Global Sustainability Leader

=== Former positions held ===
- Artistic Director, Liverpool European Capital of Culture 2008 (2004–2006)
- Artistic Director, Melbourne International Arts Festival (2002–2004)
- Advisor to the Artistic Program of 10 Days on the Island (Tasmania)(2001–2005)
- Artistic Director, Adelaide Festival (1998 and 2000)
- Artistic Advisor, Australia Day, Hannover EXPO 2000
- Artistic Director, National Festival of Australian Theatre (1993–95) in Canberra
- Chair, Community Cultural Development Board, Australia Council (1993-5)
- Commonwealth Appointee to the Centenary of Federation Advisory Committee (1994)
- Member of the Board of Directors, International Society of Performing Arts
- Member of Council, Victorian College of the Arts
- Inaugural Ambassador, Adelaide Festival Centre
- Trustee, The Don Dunstan Foundation
- Artistic Counsel, Belvoir Street Theatre (1986)
- Patron, National Affiliation of Arts Educators
- Member of the Board, Helpmann Academy.

== Honours ==
- Doctor of Letters (University of Sydney)
- Doctor of the University (Flinders University)
- Officer of the Order of Australia (Australia) – 2000
- Chevalier of the Ordre des Arts et des Lettres (France) – 2001
- Officer of the Order of the Crown (Belgium) – 2008
- Fellow of the Australian Academy of the Humanities – 2014

== Awards and nominations ==
- The Sydney Critics' Circle Award (1980)
- Australia Council Creative Fellowship (1991–93)

=== ARIA Music Awards ===
The ARIA Music Awards is an annual awards ceremony that recognises excellence, innovation, and achievement across all genres of Australian music. They commenced in 1987.

Year	Nominee / work	Award	Result	Ref.
1987	The Pack of Women	Best Original Soundtrack, Cast or Show Album	Won	
1991	Mrs Bottle's Burp	Best Children's Album	Won	

=== Helpmann Awards ===
The Helpmann Awards is an awards show, celebrating live entertainment and performing arts in Australia, presented by industry group Live Performance Australia (LPA) since 2001. In 2019, Archer received the JC Williamson Award, the LPA's highest honour, for their life's work in live performance.

Year	Nominee / work	Award	Result
2013	Robyn Archer in Concert: Que Reste-t-il?	Best Cabaret Performer	Won
2018	Robyn Archer	JC Williamson Award	awarded

=== Henry Lawson Award ===
Year	Nominee / work	Award	Result
1980	Robyn Archer	Henry Lawson Award	awarded

=== South Australian Music Awards ===
The South Australian Music Hall of Fame celebrates the careers of successful music industry personalities and creates relationships with the upcoming youth and future of South Australian Music.

Year	Nominee / work	Award	Result
2016	Robyn Archer	Hall of Fame	awarded

=== Victorian Honour Roll of Women ===
The Victorian Honour Roll of Women was established in 2001 to recognise the achievements of women from the Australian state of Victoria and Archer was one of the inaugural inductees.

=== Sir Bernard Heinze Memorial Award ===
Year	Nominee / work	Award	Result
2001	Robyn Archer	Sir Bernard Heinze Memorial Award	awarded

Preceded by Barrie Kosky	Director of the Adelaide Festival of Arts; 1998–2000	Succeeded by Peter Sellars
