= Bedevil =

1993 film

- Soundtrack album cover
- Directed by: Tracey Moffatt
- Written by: Tracey Moffatt
- Produced by: Anthony Buckley; Carol Hughes
- Starring: Lex Marinos
- Edited by: Wayne LeClos
- Release date: 28 October 1993
- Running time: 90 minutes
- Country: Australia
- Language: English

Bedevil, styled BeDevil, is a 1993 Australian horror film directed by Tracey Moffatt. It was the first feature film to be directed by an Aboriginal Australian woman.

== Plot ==
The film is a trilogy of surreal ghost stories. Inspired by ghost stories she heard as a child from both her extended Aboriginal and Irish Australian families, Moffatt created a trilogy in which characters are haunted by the past. All three stories are set in Moffatt's highly stylised, hyper-real, hyper-imaginary Australian landscape.

=== Mr. Chuck ===
Mr. Chuck is the first of the three-part series featured in BeDevil. It tells the story of a young Indigenous Australian boy haunted by the ghost of an American GI who drowned in the swamp around which much of this segment takes place. Various non-linear events of the boy's childhood are presented through the perspectives of two narrators: the boy as an older man reflecting on his youth and a white woman whose family took part in the colonisation of this area of Australia. The film follows the young boy as he observes and interacts with white settlers who are building a cinema on top of the swamp, while simultaneously holding a caretaker position to his two younger siblings, experiencing abuse at the hands of adults in his family, and having episodic interactions with the ghost of the American GI. These clips of memory are framed by the two narrators’ alternating recounting of them, presented in the style of a documentary interview.

=== Choo Choo Choo Choo ===
In the desolate plains of outback Queensland, Ruby (played by Moffatt) and her family are haunted by invisible trains which run on a track beside their house. The ghost of a young girl killed by a train drives Ruby and her family away. After many years Ruby returns to experience the ghostly presence yet again.

=== Lovin' the Spin I'm in ===
Imelda's people are Torres Strait Islanders. When her son Bebe and his love, Minnie, leave their community to escape opposition to their marriage, Imelda follows them to a small town in north Queensland. Tragedy strikes - Bebe and Minnie die, but the doomed couple never find peace. The spirits of Minnie and Bebe dance on a condemned warehouse and refuse to leave.

== Cast ==
- Lex Marinos as Dimitri
- Tracey Moffatt as Ruby Morphet
- Riccardo Natoli as Spiro
- Dina Panozzo as Voula
- Mawuyul Yanthalawuy as Maudie
- Les Foxcroft as Old Mickey
- Banula Marika as Stompie Morphet
- Auriel Andrew as Older Ruby
- Daphne Byers
- Jack Charles as Rick

== Themes ==
Storytelling is a central concern of beDevil. Creating and sharing stories is a way to make sense of the world, and both encourages and reflects connections between the past and the present, and people and places. Through the process of telling us their stories, each of the narrators in beDevil recount shared tales, a sort of modern folklore. While this brings to mind the importance of storytelling to Indigenous traditions, Moffatt explicitly states that these stories “come from both sides of my background – my white relatives as well as my black relatives.”

Yet she also insists that “I don’t think you can call the stories particularly white or Aboriginal”. The hybrid nature of Moffatt's work reflects the way that she perceives the multicultural make-up of Australian society, and she explains that “it is completely natural for me to represent that mixing of races”. beDevil is very much about her stories, weaving together “a personal mythology”, and presenting images that are “so personal that a lot of the time they embarrass me”.

== Production ==
Tracey Moffatt approached Tony Buckley to produce as she was impressed by the films he had made, especially The Night, the Prowler (1978). Bedevil was filmed on location in Charleville and Bribie Island, Queensland.

== Release ==
Bedevil was screened in the Un Certain Regard section at the 1993 Cannes Film Festival, before general release on 28 October 1993.

== Reception ==
Despite good reviews from critics, the film was a box office flop, grossing $27,300. Similarly, the soundtrack release flopped; however, it was nominated for an ARIA Award for Best Original Soundtrack, Cast or Show Album in 1994.

== Box office ==
Bedevil grossed A$27,300 at the box office in Australia.

== Soundtrack ==
beDevil: Original Soundtrack Recording

Soundtrack album by Carl Vine
- Released: 1993 (1M1CD1020)
- Recorded: 1993
- Genre: Score
- Language: English
- Label: oneMone Records Pty. Ltd.
- Producer: Philip Powers

This soundtrack features music composed and conducted by Carl Vine.

=== Track listing ===
Mr Chuck
1. Title Sequence
2. The Swamp
3. Young Danny Robs the Shop
4. Harmless Island Travelogue
5. Dangerous Island Travelogue
6. Young Danny Goes to the Cinema
7. Young Danny Wrecks the Cinema
8. The G.I. Revealed

Choo Choo Choo Choo
9. The Spirits
10. Ghost Train
11. Haunted Kangaroo Hunt
12. Haunting Spirits
13. Train of Terror

Lovin' the Spin I'm In
14. Imelda and Minnie's Stories
15. Spiro's Story
16. Minnie & Beba Appear
17. Imelda's Nightmare
18. Frieda's Story
19. Minnie & Beba Dance
20. The Nightmare Ends
21. End Titles

=== Credits ===
According to the soundtrack liner notes, the following people were involved in its production:

- Conductor - Carl Vine
- Engineer - Craig Preston
- Soundtrack album mixing - Michael Stavrou
- Soundtrack album producers - Carl Vine and Philip Powers
- Mastering - Kathy Naunton
- Studio - Albert Studios
- Executive soundtrack producer - Philip Powers
- Cover art - Zero Plus Design Co.
- Art direction - Alex Cotton (Ready Set Design)
