= The Pack of Women =

- Written by: Robyn Archer
- Directed by: Ted Robinson
- Starring: Robyn Archer; Judi Connelli; Tracy Harvey
- Country of origin: Australia
- Original language: English

Original release
- Network: ABC
- Release: 1986

The Pack of Women was a cabaret devised by Australian performer and director Robyn Archer, first performed in London in 1981. Although funny and entertaining, the work also set out to shock audiences into examining the role of women in Western society. The title is a metaphor for the game of life played according to rules in which sexual politics were critical. In 1983, it was produced by Understudies (Sue Hill & Chris Westwood), directed by Archer and designed by Roger Kirk. It played seasons in Sydney, Melbourne, Adelaide and Canberra with a cast consisting of Jane Clifton, Judi Connelli and Michele Fawdon.

The Pack of Women was subsequently made into a 1986 television special for the ABC featuring Archer, Connelli, Tracy Harvey, Jo Kennedy and Meryl Tankard. Described as "perhaps the most daring and unashamedly radical thing to happen to Aunty in a long time", it contained the first use of the word cunt on Australian television. The soundtrack won the inaugural ARIA Award for Best Original Soundtrack or Cast Album.

== Television soundtrack ==
The Pack of Women

Soundtrack album by Various
- Released: 1986
- Label: ABC Records
- Producer: Andrew Bell

=== Track listing ===
LP/Cassette

No.	Title	Writer(s)	Vocals	Length
1.	"Is That Me?"	R. Archer, Andrew Bell	Jo Kennedy	3:07
2.	"Whose Pleasure?"	R. Archer, A. Bell	Robyn Archer	3:40
3.	"Waiting Too Long"	R. Archer, A. Bell	Judi Connelli, Tracy Harvey, Jo Kennedy	2:11
4.	"In Business"	R. Archer, A. Bell	Jo Kennedy	3:13
5.	"Nobody Sings"	C. Churchill/M. Random	Tracy Harvey	2:23
6.	"(S)he's a Rebel"	G. Pitney	Jo Kennedy	2:10
7.	"Coupling"	R. Archer	Judi Connelli	2:39
8.	"Sweet Solitary Blues"	R. Archer	Robyn Archer	4:06
9.	"The Ballad of Dancing Doreen"	R. McTell	Judi Connelli	3:05
10.	"Suburban Sonnet"	G. Harwood, R. Archer	Robyn Archer	2:54
11.	"Menstruation Blues"	R. Archer	Judi Connelli, Robyn Archer, Maree Steinway, Tracy Harvey	3:39
12.	"Dig Deeper"	R. Archer, A. Bell	Robyn Archer, Meryl Tankard, Judi Connelli, Tracy Harvey, Jo Kennedy	3:03
