= Jann Castor =

Jan Castor
- Birth name: Wiesław Ruciński
- Also known as: Jann Castor
- Born: 27 June 1954; Włocławek, Poland
- Died: 21 April 2016 (aged 61)
- Occupation(s): Musician, composer

Jann Castor (27 June 1954 – 21 April 2016), sometimes spelt Jan Castor, was a Polish Australian musician and composer. His soundtrack album for the TV series Red Express was nominated for the 1992 ARIA Award for Best Original Cast or Show Album.

Castor was born as Wiesław Ruciński in Włocławek, Poland. In the late 70s, he established the band Res Publica which later morphed into Republika. In 1981, he moved to Australia and took on the Castor moniker. He continued working as a musician and became a film composer, with credits including Kiss of Death (1997), Maniacts (2001), Asylum Days (2001), Four Nights with Anna (2008), and 11 Minutes (2015).

== Discography ==
- "You’re Gotta Go" (1981) – Tonpress
- Precedence (1990) – BMG
- Red Express (1991) – BMG
- Vitamins for the Soul (2009) – Motion Man

Jon Anderson and Jann Castor

- Unbroken Spirit (2000)

== Awards and nominations ==
=== ARIA Music Awards ===
The ARIA Music Awards is an annual awards ceremony held by the Australian Recording Industry Association. They commenced in 1987.

Year	Nominee / work	Award	Result	Ref.
1992	Red Express	Best Original Soundtrack, Cast or Show Album	Nominated	
