= Tonight: Lola Blau =

Tonight: Lola Blau (or Heute Abend: Lola Blau in the original German) is a cabaret musical with music and original text by Georg Kreisler with the English version by Don White.

It concerns Lola Blau, a European Jewish cabaret singer, who flees to Switzerland from the 'Anschluss' annexation of Austria into Nazi Germany, and rises to stardom in the United States. Disillusioned with stardom and fame, she returns to her native Vienna, concluding that even after the war people had not changed much.

It was first performed at the Kleines Theatre der Josefstadt in Vienna in 1971. The English version was first performed in Australia by Robyn Archer in 1979.

== Recording ==
- Robyn Archer, Tonight: Lola Blau, Trafalgar Records, Australia, 1980
