= Felicity Fox =

Felicity Wilcox (Fox)
- Born: Felicity Wilcox
- Origin: Australia
- Occupations: Composer, musician

Felicity Wilcox is an Australian composer, academic, and musician (working as a film composer under the alias Felicity Fox) .

== Accolades ==
Australian Film Institute Awards

Nominated. 1992 AACTA Award for Best Original Music Score for Redheads
Nominated. 2008 AACTA Award for Best Sound in a Documentary for The Oasis
Nominated. 2009 AACTA Award for Best Sound in a Documentary for The Choir

With Phil Judd, Sam Hayward, David White

ARIA Award

Nominated. 1999 ARIA Award for Best Original Soundtrack, Cast or Show Album for Afrika - Cape Town to Cairo

APRA Awards

Nominated. 1999 APRA/AGSC Award for Best Soundtrack Album for Afrika - Cape Town to Cairo
Nominated. 2003 APRA/AGSC Award for Best Documentary Soundtrack Album for A Cave In The Snow
Winner. 1997 AGSC Award Best Original Song in a Feature Film for "Fistful of Flies".

FIFREC FILM AWARD, FRANCE

Winner. 1993 BEST ORIGINAL MUSIC for 'LOYAL TO MY IMAGE'

AMC/APRA Art Music Awards

Finalist. 2023 AMC/APRA Art Music Awards for Work of the Year for Sound Fields performed by Rubiks Collective
Finalist. 2022 AMC/APRA Art Music Awards for Performance of the Year for Tipping Point performed by Andrew Blanch and Ensemble Offspring

== Discography ==
Solo

- Threading the Light (2022) - Move
- Uncovered Ground - Felicity Wilcox Collected Chamber Works (2021) Ensemble Offspring and various performers - Move
- Moment (2018) - Psychopyjama
- The Curling Vine (2015)

Pluto (Felicity Fox and Gene Gill)

- Rise from the Ocean (2003) - Heavy Records

Soundtrack albums

- Afrika Cape Town To Cairo (1998) - BMG
- The President Vs. David Hicks (2004) - Olsen-levy Prods

== Selected Concert Works ==
- Call and (a) Response (2022), for soprano, percussion, clarinet and field recording.
- Sound Fields (2022), for cello, percussion, piano, flute. Winner of the 2021 Pythia Prize commission for Rubiks Collective.
- Currawong Call (2021), for solo instrument and field recording.
- To the Sea (2021), for solo violin.
- Tipping Point (2021), for 2 guitars, violin, double bass, percussion, piano, clarinet.
- Reflections (2018), for viola, cello, live interactive electronics and visualisations, for the IMMERSE Project, University of Technology Sydney and Sydney Festival 2019
- SON-ombra (2018), String quartet no.1. Commissioned by Sean Botha.
- Vivre Sa Vie: Composer's Cut (2017), for flute, clarinet, percussion, piano and images, with film by Jean-Luc Godard. Commissioned by The Australia Ensemble.
- Snow (2016), trio for clarinet, cello and piano/vibraphone
- People of this Place (2016), for solo bass clarinet
- EXIT (2015), 'animated notation' composition for flexible ensemble, electronics and image. Commissioned by Decibel New Music Ensemble.
- Uncovered Ground (2015), for large chamber ensemble. Commissioned by Ironwood and Ensemble Offspring.
- Gouttes d'un Sang Etranger (2014), for viola da gamba, saxophone, electronics, spoken word, and images. Vivid Festival 2014.
- Quotet (2013), for piano quartet and animations, for Australia Piano Quartet and University of Technology Sydney.
- Threading the Light (2012), oratorio for soprano, mezzo-soprano, baritone, percussion, live electronics and string orchestra.
- Dual (2010) for soprano, alto and chamber ensemble (for Kammerklang Vox and Halcyon)

== Selected filmography ==
=== Feature films ===
- Reindeer in my Saami Heart, 2016, Scandinavian Film Festival, Margaret Mead Film Festival, NYC.
- I, Psychopath, 2009, ABC/ARTE/Canada TV
- The Oasis, 2008, ABC, AFI nomination for Best Soundtrack
- Seed Hunter, 2008, ABC/ARTE/ Canada TV
- The Choir, 2007, SBS/Nat Geo, AFI nomination for Best Soundtrack, 2009
- The President Vs. David Hicks, 2004, SBS
- The End Of Extinction, 2000, Discovery Channel ABC
- Fistful Of Flies, 1996, (AGSC Award, Best Original Song for a Feature Film,1997)
- Redheads, 1992, Roxy Films, AFI nomination Best Music for a feature film
- The Last Crop, 1990, ABC

=== TV Series ===
- Baby Boom To Bust, SBS, 2008
- About Women, SBS, 2008
- Dust to Dust, ABC, 2005
- Journeys to the Ends of the Earth, National Geographic Channel, ABC, 2000-2001
- Afrika Cape Town to Cairo, ABC, 1998, (ARIA and AGSC/APRA nominations for Best Soundtrack Album, 1999)
- The Makers, ABC, 1989

=== Documentaries ===
- The Soldier, Shark Island Productions, screened Antenna Documentary Festival, Sydney, 2011
- Playing With Clay, Yowie Films, screened Dendy Opera Quays, August 2010
- Maverick Mother, Go Girl Productions, SBS, 2008
- The Passion Of Gina Sinozich, Vagabond Films, SBS, 2008
- Jabe Babe-A Heightened Life, Go Girl Productions, SBS, 2005
- Selling Sickness, Paradigm Pictures, SBS, 2004
- A Cave in the Snow, Firelight/Tiger Eye Productions, SBS, Nominated APRA/AGSC Best music, 2003
- Everyday Brave: Stranger In My Skin, Film Australia, SBS, 2002
- Gulpilil, One Red Blood, Jotz Productions, ABC, 2002
- Little Dove-Big Voyage, Firelight Productions, Channel 7, 2001
- Breaking Bows And Arrows, Firelight/Tiger Eye Productions, SBS, 2001
- Romancing the Chakra, Anna Broinowski, ABC, 1999
- Up In The Sky: Tracey Moffat In New York, Jane Cole Productions, ABC, 1998
- Mao's New Suit, Singing Nomad Productions, SBS, 1997
- The Golden Pig, Oracle Pictures, SBS, 1996
- The Last Magician, Land Beyond Productions, SBS, 1995
- Hellbento!, SBS, 1995
- The Isabellas, Singing Nomad Productions, SBS, 1994
- It's Ruth!, Yowie Films, ABC, 1994
- Loaded, Film Australia, SBS, 1993
- Loyal To My Image, Harriet McKern, Winner, Best Music, FIFREC Film Festival, France1993
- Patterns Of Landscape, Film Australia, SBS, 1988
- Mum, How Do I Spell Gorbatrof?, Film Australia, SBS, 1987
- The Nights Belong To The Novelist, Yowie Films, ABC, 1986
- Sands of Time, Yowie Films, ABC, 1985

=== Short films ===
- Wall Boy, Shark Island Prod., Dungog Film Festival, 2009
- Polly And Me, Shark Island Prod., ABC, 2008
- Crocodile Dreaming, Darlene Johnson, SBS, 2006
- A Once Smiling Woman, Harriet McKern, 2001
- Tsunami, Anna Broinowski, St Kilda Film Festival, 2000
- Vengeance, Wendy Chandler, Sydney Film Festival, 1997
- Lipstick, ABC, Harriet McKern, 1994, SBS, 1996
- Best Wishes, Monica Pellizzari, Venice Film Festival, 1993
- Just Desserts, Monica Pellizzari, Venice Film Festival, 1992 (Winner Baby Lion Award, 1992)
- Norm And Ahmed, SBS, 1988
- An Ordinary Woman, Sue Brooks and Alison Tilson, Sydney Film Festival, 1988

== Awards and nominations ==
=== ARIA Music Awards ===
The ARIA Music Awards is an annual awards ceremony held by the Australian Recording Industry Association. They commenced in 1987.

Year	Nominee / work	Award	Result	Ref.
1999	Afrika - Cape Town to Cairo	Best Original Soundtrack	Nominated	
