= Christine Douglas =

Australian opera singer and director

- Origin: Australia
- Genres: Opera
- Occupation(s): Opera singer, director

Christine Douglas is an Australian opera singer and director.

Douglas, a soprano, trained at the Victorian College of the Arts. She performed in multiple Australian Opera productions including Cosi fan tutte, Fidelio, La Bohème, A Midsummer Night's Dream, Pagliacci, The Magic Flute, Patience, and Hansel and Gretel.

The soundtrack album to an Opera Australia staging of Hansel and Gretel earned a nomination for the 1999 ARIA Award for Cast or Show Album for Opera Australia, Christine Douglas and Suzanne Johnston.

In 2003 Douglas and Sylvie Renaud-Calmel established Pacific Opera. With Douglas as artistic director they have staged productions of several operas including Cosi fan Tutti set in a football club, Barber of Seville done "Los Angeles–style" and The Magic Flute as a circus show. She has also directed The Marriage of Figaro for Opera Australia.

== Awards and nominations ==
=== ARIA Music Awards ===
The ARIA Music Awards is an annual awards ceremony held by the Australian Recording Industry Association. They commenced in 1987.

| Year | Nominee / work | Award | Result | Ref. |
|---|---|---|---|---|
| 1999 | Hansel & Gretel (with Opera Australia & Suzanne Johnston) | Best Original Cast or Show Album | Nominated | |
