= Suzanne Johnston =

Australian operatic mezzo-soprano (born 1958)

Suzanne Johnston (born 1958) is an Australian operatic mezzo-soprano who first performed professionally in 1981.

Born in the Melbourne suburb of Murrumbeena, Johnston attended Kilvington Grammar School. She then had singing lessons at the Victorian College of the Arts with Joan Hammond.

Along with Judi Connelli she won the 1999 ARIA Award for Best Original Cast or Show Album for their album Perfect Strangers.

Johnston and Connelli have performed the cabaret shows Perfect Strangers and Take Two! around Australia. The pair, first with Jennifer McGregor and later Rosemary Boyle, were part of the 3 Divas who have toured nationally and released a self-titled album in 2000.

== Awards ==
=== ARIA Music Awards ===
The ARIA Music Awards is an annual awards ceremony held by the Australian Recording Industry Association. They commenced in 1987.

Year	Nominee / work	Award	Result	Ref.
1999	Perfect Strangers (with Judi Connelli)	Best Original Cast / Show Recording	Won	
1999	Hansel and Gretel (with Opera Australia, Christine Douglas)	Best Original Cast / Show Recording	Nominated	

=== Mo Awards ===
The Australian Entertainment Mo Awards (commonly known informally as the Mo Awards), were annual Australian entertainment industry awards. They recognise achievements in live entertainment in Australia from 1975 to 2016. Suzanne Johnston won one award in that time.

Year	Nominee / work	Award	Result (wins only)
1992	Suzanne Johnston	Operatic Performance of the Year	Won
