= Red Express =

Red Express, sub titled The Trans-Siberian Railroad, is a 1991 TV documentary following the Trans Siberian railway. It was part of ABC's World of Discovery series. It was written and produced by Hugh Piper and narrated by Ron Perlman.

A soundtrack album, composed and performed by Jan Castor, was nominated for the 1992 ARIA Award for Best Original Soundtrack, Cast or Show Album.
