= Story of Abbey =

2001 rock opera by David McLean

Story Of Abbey is an Australian rock opera created by David McLean. It opened at the Seymour Centre in November 2002 for a run of nine days.

A soundtrack album, credited to Play Act One, was released in 2001 and was nominated for the 2002 ARIA Award for Best Cast/Show Album.

Story Of Abbey got mixed reviews. Writing in the Sydney Morning Herald, Stephen Dunne states that the opera "has two central weaknesses: a score that doesn't contain a single good song, and a dull narrative of decline that is almost incomprehensible." Commenting on the soundtrack, The Newcastle Herald's Chad Watson calls it an "extraordinary tale of an ordinary woman."

== Personnel ==
=== Cast ===
- Yeh Lee - Abbey
- David McLean

=== Crew ===
- David McLean - Writer, Producer
- Yeh Lee - Producer
- Gavin Mitford - Choreographer

== Track listing ==
1. Jackal's Play
2. Run To The Shadows (Letter)
3. Sonnet
4. Fly Away (Puddles)
5. Dogs Are Howling (Swings)
6. Follow Me (Trumpet)
7. Choir Of Angels
8. Happy Faces
9. Mr Magic Man
10. Christmas
11. Crack On The Street
12. Sweet Lady
13. Tomorrow I Will
14. Abbey
15. Suffering
16. Go Away
17. Reach Out
18. Angel As My Witness
19. A Little Light
20. Her Knife
21. Forest
