= Judi Connelli =

Australian singer and actress

Judi Connelli AM
- Born: 20 July 1947 (age 79); Brisbane, Queensland, Australia
- Occupations: Singer; Actress
- Awards: 4 MO Awards; Green Room Award; Helpmann Award; New York Dramalogue Award

Judi Connelli AM (born 20 July 1947) is an Australian singer and actress in theatre, opera and television. Connelli is best known for her career in opera and stage musicals. As a singer she has starred in performances with the Sydney Symphony Orchestra and the Melbourne Symphony Orchestra and also internationally in New York and the United Kingdom.

== Career ==
Connelli is also known for her television soap operas such roles most especially The Young Doctors, in which she played regular Annemarie Austin from 1977 to 1978 and Prisoner playing 'Cookie', in episodes originally aired in 1982. Connelli's work includes leading theatre roles with Opera Australia in The Rake's Progress (Mother Goose), The Mikado (Katisha), Fiddler on the Roof (Golda), The Merry Widow (Zozo), Sweeney Todd (Mrs. Lovett) and The Gondoliers (Duchess of Plaza-Toro).

Other productions include Into the Woods (The Witch), The Threepenny Opera (Mrs. Peachum), Chicago (Matron Mama Morton), The Pack of Women, Jerry's Girls and Cabaret (Fraulein Schneider). In concert she has appeared in Sunset Boulevard (Norma Desmond), Gypsy (Mamma Rose), Australia's Leading Ladies, Follies, Showstoppers, Candide and The 3 Divas.

== Honours ==
In 2004, she was made a Member of the Order of Australia (AM) by the Queen of Australia for services to theatre and charity.

== Discography ==
=== Solo albums ===
Title	Details	Peak chart positions
Title	Details	AUS
Introducing Judi Connelli	Released: 1977; Label: RCA Victor (VPL1-0160)	—
Turning Point	Released: 1987; Label: ABC Records (L 38689)	—
On My Way to You	Released: 1997; Label: WEA (4509999762)	—
Live in London	Released: 1998; Label: Dress Circle (DG CD 01)	—
The 3 Divas (with Suzanne Johnston and Jennifer McGregor)	Released: 2000	—
Back to Before	Released: 2001	—

=== Cast albums and soundtracks ===
- Chicago - original Australian cast (1981)
- The Pack of Women (1986)
- The Money or the Gun - Stairways to Heaven (1992)
- Once in a Blue Moon - A celebration of Australian musicals (1994)
- Perfect Strangers (with Suzanne Johnston) (1999)
- Mary Poppins - original Australian cast (2010)

== Awards ==
=== ARIA Music Awards ===
The ARIA Music Awards is an annual awards ceremony held by the Australian Recording Industry Association. They commenced in 1987.

Year	Nominee / work	Award	Result	Ref.
1999	Perfect Strangers (with Suzanne Johnston)	Best Original Cast / Show Recording	Won	
2002	Back to Before	Best Cast or Show Album	Nominated	

=== Mo Awards ===
The Australian Entertainment Mo Awards (commonly known informally as the Mo Awards), were annual Australian entertainment industry awards. They recognise achievements in live entertainment in Australia from 1975 to 2016. Judi Connelli won four awards in that time.

Year	Nominee / work	Award	Result (wins only)
1991	Judi Connelli	Female Musical Theatre Performer of the Year	Won
1993	Judi Connelli	Female Musical Theatre Performer of the Year	Won
2001	Judi Connelli	Female Musical Theatre Performer of the Year	Won
2002	Judi Connelli	Supporting Musical Theatrical Performer of the Year	Won
