= Janet Seidel =

Australian singer and pianist (1955–2017)

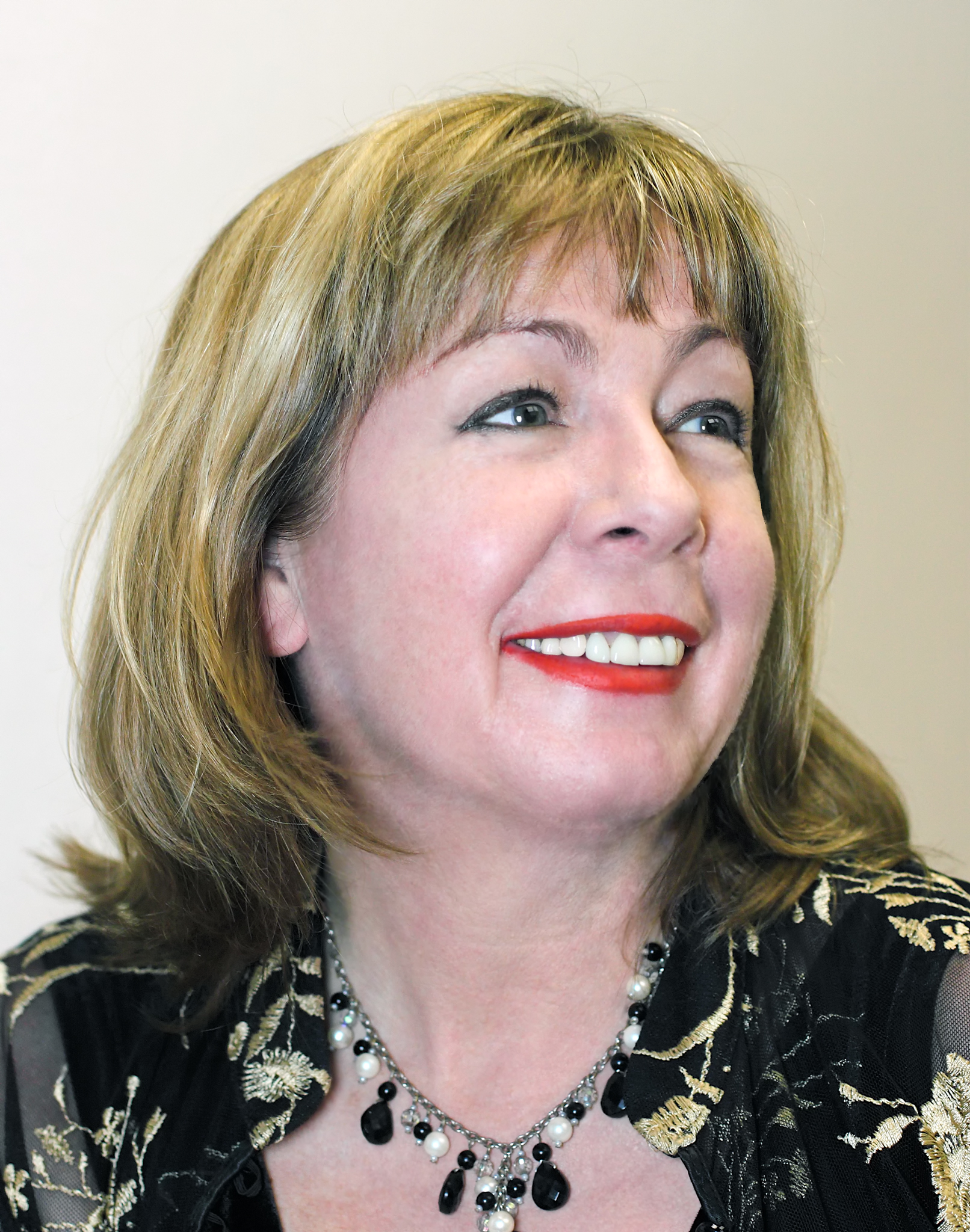
- Seidel at Tokyo Uniform Club in Japan for a concert (April 2010)

Background information
- Born: 28 May 1955; Cummins, South Australia, Australia
- Died: 7 August 2017 (aged 62) Sydney, New South Wales, Australia
- Genres: Jazz, traditional pop
- Occupations: Singer, musician, educator
- Instruments: Vocals, piano
- Years active: 1974–2017
- Label: La Brava

Janet Seidel (28 May 1955 – 7 August 2017) was an Australian jazz vocalist and pianist.

== Education ==
Seidel studied at the Elder Conservatorium at the University of Adelaide (BMusic, 1973–1976).

== Career ==
Seidel worked as a high school music teacher in New South Wales at the Sydney Girls High School and as a professional musician as a pianist and singer. From 1976 to 1980, she was an active member of the Adelaide Feminist Theatre Group. For their first show, The Carolina Chisel Show (1976), she wrote the piano arrangements. For the musical melodrama The Redheads' Revenge (1978), she wrote and arranged all the songs as well as conducting and playing in the orchestra. She was also involved in the writing, production and direction of the show. For the revue Out of the Frying Pan (1980), she wrote five original songs, collaborated with Judy Szekeres on the musical arrangement, played in the orchestra and was involved with the choreography.

Seidel's 18 CD albums, recorded with musicians including her brother, bassist David Seidel, have been nominated for awards such as the ARIA Music Awards. Her album Moon of Manakoora won the Bell Award for Best Australian Jazz Vocal Album in 2006.

== Death ==
Seidel died on 7 August 2017 from ovarian cancer in Sydney at the age of 62. Some newspapers mistakenly reported her death as 8 August. A posthumous CD of previously unreleased recordings was released in September 2018 in Japan. Entitled You Are There, it was produced by her brother David Seidel.

== Discography ==
=== Albums ===
List of albums, with selected details
Title	Details
Little Jazz Bird	Released: 1992; Format: CD; Label: La Brava Music (0001)
Winter Moon	Released: 1994; Format: CD; Label: La Brava Music (LB0002)
Doodlin (with Tom Baker)	Released: 1995; Format: CD; Label: La Brava Music (LB9504)
The Art of Lounge	Released: 1997; Format: CD; Label: La Brava Music (LB9702)
The Way You Wear Your Hat	Released: 1997; Format: CD; Label: La Brava Music (LB9801)
The Art of Lounge Volume Two	Released: 1999; Format: CD; Label: La Brava Music (LB9902)
Comme Ci, Comme Ça	Released: 2000; Format: CD; Label: La Brava Music (LB0033)
Love Letters (with William Galison)	Released: 2000; Format: CD; Label: La Brava Music (LB0034)
Doris & Me	Released: 2001; Format: CD; Label: La Brava Music (LB0038)
Don't Smoke in Bed	Released: 2002; Format: CD; Label: La Brava Music (LB0050)
The Art of Lounge Volume Three	Released: 2003; Format: CD; Label: La Brava Music (LB0056)
Dear Blossom	Released: 2004; Format: CD; Label: La Brava Music (LB0064)
Hooray for Christmas	Released: 2004; Format: CD; Label: La Brava Music (LB0065)
Moon of Manakoora	Released: 2005; Format: CD; Label: La Brava Music (LB0068)
"Charade" Henry Mancini Song Book (with Joe Chindamo)	Released: 2007; Format: CD; Label: La Brava Music (LB0077)
You Are There	Released: 2018; Format: CD; Label: La Brava Music (LB0082); Posthumous release

=== Compilation albums ===
List of compilations, with selected details
Title	Details
Hits	Released: 2004 (UK and Ireland); Format: CD; Label: Hot Records (HOT 1095)
Best of Janet Seidel	Released: 2012 (Indonesia); Format: 2×CD; Label: Platinum Records

== Awards and nominations ==
=== ARIA Music Awards ===
The ARIA Music Awards is an annual awards ceremony that recognises excellence, innovation, and achievement across all genres of Australian music. They commenced in 1987.

Year	Nominee / work	Award	Result	Ref.
1999	The Way You Wear Your Hat	Best Jazz Album	Nominated	
2000	Art Of Lounge Volume Two	Best Jazz Album	Nominated	
2001	Doris and Me	Best Original Cast or Show Album	Nominated	
