= Perfect Strangers (Judi Connelli and Suzanne Johnston album) =

Studio album by Judi Connelli and Suzanne Johnston
- Released: 1999
- Label: ABC

Perfect Strangers is a 1999 album and subsequent live shows by cabaret star Judi Connelli and opera singer Suzanne Johnston. The album is a collection of duets for women and was recorded with the Tasmanian Symphony Orchestra. The album won the ARIA Music Award for Best Original Soundtrack Album in 1999.

== Tracklist ==
1. "Our Time" / "Everybody Says Don't"
2. "Climb Every Mountain"
3. "With a Song (medley)"
4. "Look to the Moon"
5. "Perfect Strangers"
6. "No Matter What Happens"
7. "Children of the Wind"
8. "Music of the Night"
9. "Time After Time"
10. "On the Street Where You Live"
11. "The Nearness of You"
12. "When Did I Fall in Love"
13. "Time Heals Everything"
14. "Pretty Women" / "Johanna"
15. "Happy Days Are Here Again" / "Get Happy"
