= Scotland the Brave (concert) =

Scotland the Brave is a series of concerts celebrating Scottish music in Australia. Conducted by Colin Harper it was first held in Brisbane Concert Hall in 1998. It returned there in 1999 before moving to the Sydney Opera House later in the year and was later presented at other venues around Australia and internationally.

A 2000 Sydney Opera House concert was broadcast nationally by the ABC. A video of that concert was released and by November 2001 had sold around 30,000 copies with the CD version selling 20,000 copies.

== Album ==
In 2000 ABC Classics released an album of highlights recorded at the Sydney Opera House concert on 10 June 2000. It was nominated for the 2001 ARIA Award for Best Cast or Show Album.

=== Track listing ===
1. Wi' a Hundred Pipers
2. Isle of Mull
3. The Long Ships
4. The Dark Island
5. The Uist Tramping Song
6. Dream Angus
7. I'll Walk Beside You
8. My Heart is in the Highlands
9. Banks of Doon
10. Skye Boat Song
11. The Star of Rabbie Burns
12. Sleeps the Noon
13. Annie Laurie
14. The Song of the Clyde
15. Scottish Singalong
16. Gude Wallace / The Gael
17. Scots Wha Hae
18. Highland Cathedral
19. Amazing Grace
20. Auld Lang Syne
21. Will Ye No' Come Back Again

=== Personnel ===
- McKinnon Andrew, Director
- Colin Harper. Conductor
- Greg Moore, tenor
- Thomas Keenan, baritone
- Lisa Lockland, soprano
- Stephen Baker, mouth organ
- Queensland Pops Orchestra
- Australian Concert Orchestra
- Julie Anne O'Reilly, concert master
- Max Ahrens, General Manager
- Pymble Ladies' College Choir
- Imogen Men's Chorus
