= Snapshot =

Snapshot, snapshots or snap shot may refer to:

- Snapshot (photography), a photograph taken without preparation

== Computing ==
- Snapshot (computer storage), the state of a system at a particular point in time
- Snapshot (file format) or SNP, a file format for reports from Microsoft Access

== Film ==
- Snapshot (1979 film), an Australian film directed by Simon Wincer
- Snapshot, a 2017 film featuring Danny Trejo
- Snapshot (2026 film), a British horror film directed by Joseph Archer
- Snapshots (2002 film), an Anglo-Dutch American film starring Burt Reynolds and Julie Christie
- Snapshots (2018 film), an American film directed by Melanie Mayron

== Music ==
=== Albums ===
- Snapshot (Daryl Braithwaite album), 2005
- Snapshot (George Duke album) or the title song, 1992
- Snapshot (Mission of Burma album), 2004
- Snapshot (Roger Glover album), 2002
- Snapshot (The Strypes album), 2013
- Snapshot (Sylvia album) or the title song (see below), 1983
- Snapshot, by Knacker, 2000
- Snapshot, by Tommy Bolin, 1999
- Snapshot, by ReGLOSS, 2025
- Snapshot: Live at the Iron Horse, by Livingston Taylor, 1999
- Snapshots (Eleanor McEvoy album), 1999
- Snapshots (Kim Wilde album), 2011

=== Songs ===
- "Snapshot" (RuPaul song), 1996
- "Snapshot" (Sylvia song), 1983
- "Snapshot", by f(x) from Pink Tape, 2013
- "Snapshot", by Moka Only from Concert for One, 2017
- "Snap Shot", by Slave from Show Time, 1981
- "SnapShot", by In2It, 2018

== Other uses ==
- Snapshot (board game), a 1979 board wargame published by Game Designers' Workshop
- Snapshot (video game), a 2012 platform indie game
- Snapshot (novella), a 2017 novella by Brandon Sanderson
- SNAPSHOT or SNAP-10A, a 1965 American nuclear-powered satellite
- Snap shot (ice hockey), a fast shot made by snapping the wrists
- Snapshots (TV series), a 2016 Canadian reality program for children
- Snapshots, a 2005 jukebox musical of Stephen Schwartz songs
- Snapshot, a Corteva trade name for a herbicide formulation of Isoxaben and trifluralin
- Snapshot (novel), 2005 crime novel by Garry Disher
