= ARIA Award for Best Original Soundtrack, Cast or Show Album =

Australia music award

ARIA Award for Best Original Soundtrack / Cast / Show Album
- Country: Australia
- Presented by: Australian Recording Industry Association (ARIA)
- First award: 1987
- Currently held by: François Tétaz, My Brilliant Career (2026)
- Website: ariaawards.com.au

The ARIA Music Award for Best Original Soundtrack / Cast / Show Album is an award presented within the Fine Arts Awards at the annual ARIA Music Awards. The ARIA Awards recognise "the many achievements of Aussie artists across all music genres", and have been given by the Australian Recording Industry Association (ARIA) since 1987.

Original soundtrack albums and cast/show albums by solo artists, groups and various artist compilations are eligible. This includes recordings of existing or planned theatrical productions and soundtracks, scores and underscores for existing or planned film and television productions. Compilation soundtracks must contain over 50% of previously unreleased material by tracks and/or time and all artists must meet the artist eligibility criteria. It is judged by a specialist judging school of representatives experienced with the genre.

The ARIA Award for Best Original Soundtrack/Cast/Show Album has been awarded since the inaugural ARIA Awards in 1987, and was originally named Best Australian Original Soundtrack or Cast Recording. Between 1999 and 2003, separate awards were given for Best Original Soundtrack Album and Best Original Show/Cast Album.

== Winners and nominees ==
In the following table, the winner is highlighted in a separate colour and in boldface; the nominees are those that are not highlighted or in boldface. Nominees in 1988 are not available in published sources.

Winner marked in a separate colour

| Year | Winner(s) | Album title |
|---|---|---|
**1987** (1st)
| **1987** (1st) | **Robyn Archer** | **The Pack of Women** |
| **1987** (1st) | Martin Armiger | Dancing Daze |
| **1987** (1st) | Nathan Waks | For Love Alone |
| **1987** (1st) | Peter Best | "Crocodile" Dundee |
| **1987** (1st) | Peter Carey, Martin Armiger | Illusion |
**1988** (2nd)
| **1988** (2nd) | **Original Australian Cast Recording** | **Nine** |
| **1988** (2nd) | Mario Millo | The Lighthorsemen |
**1989** (3rd)
| **1989** (3rd) | **Kate Ceberano and Wendy Matthews** | **You've Always Got the Blues (songs from the ABC TV series Stringer)** |
| **1989** (3rd) | Various Artists | Rikky and Pete |
| **1989** (3rd) | David Reeves | Seven Little Australians |
| **1989** (3rd) | Bruce Rowland | The Man from Snowy River II |
| **1989** (3rd) | Various Artists | Boulevard of Broken Dreams |
**1990** (4th)
| **1990** (4th) | **Original Australian Cast Recording** | **Anything Goes** |
| **1990** (4th) | Australian Cast Recording | 42nd Street |
| **1990** (4th) | Various Artists | Sons of Steel |
| **1990** (4th) | Various Artists | Spirits of the Air, Gremlins of the Clouds |
| **1990** (4th) | Various Artists | The Navigator |
**1991** (5th)
| **1991** (5th) | **Jon English and David Mackay** | **Paris** |
| **1991** (5th) | Brian May | Bloodmoon |
| **1991** (5th) | Bruce Smeaton | Wendy Cracked a Walnut |
| **1991** (5th) | Michael Askill & Nigel Westlake | Roads to Xanadu - The Genius That Was China |
| **1991** (5th) | Vince Jones & Grace Knight | Come in Spinner |
**1992** (6th)
| **1992** (6th) | **Mario Millo** | **Brides of Christ** |
| **1992** (6th) | Jan Castor | Red Express |
| **1992** (6th) | Not Drowning, Waving | Proof |
| **1992** (6th) | Original Australian Cast | Return to the Forbidden Planet |
| **1992** (6th) | Philip Judd | Death in Brunswick |
**1993** (7th)
| **1993** (7th) | **John Clifford White** | **Romper Stomper** |
| **1993** (7th) | Australian Cast Recording | Jesus Christ Superstar |
| **1993** (7th) | Ricky Fataar & Others | Spotswood |
| **1993** (7th) | Paul Grabowsky | The Last Days of Chez Nous |
| **1993** (7th) | Various | Strictly Ballroom |
| **1993** (7th) | Nigel Westlake | Antarctica |
**1994** (8th)
| **1994** (8th) | **Original Cast Recording** | **Hot Shoe Shuffle** |
| **1994** (8th) | The Australian Opera, Giacomo Puccini | La bohème |
| **1994** (8th) | Michael Easton, Michael Atkinson (original soundtrack) | Snowy |
| **1994** (8th) | Carl Vine | Bedevil |
| **1994** (8th) | John Waters, Lennon & McCartney | Looking Through a Glass Onion |
**1995** (9th)
| **1995** (9th) | **Cast Recording** | **The Pirates of Penzance** |
| **1995** (9th) | Martin Armiger | Fornicon |
| **1995** (9th) | Guy Gross | The Priscilla Companion Original Score |
| **1995** (9th) | Various | Heartland |
| **1995** (9th) | Various | Metal Skin |
| **1995** (9th) | Various | Once in a Blue Moon |
**1996** (10th)
| **1996** (10th) | **Australian Cast Recording** | **Beauty and the Beast** |
| **1996** (10th) | Australian Cast Recording | The Secret Garden |
| **1996** (10th) | Iva Davies | The Berlin Tapes |
| **1996** (10th) | Cezary Skubiszewski | Lilian's Story |
| **1996** (10th) | Nigel Westlake | Babe |
**1997** (11th)
| **1997** (11th) | **Blixa Bargeld, Nick Cave, Mick Harvey** | **To Have & to Hold** |
| **1997** (11th) | Mario Millo | G.P. |
| **1997** (11th) | Various | Idiot Box |
| **1997** (11th) | Various | Love and Other Catastrophes |
| **1997** (11th) | Various | What I Have Written |
**1998** (12th)
| **1998** (12th) | **Original Cast Recording** | **The Boy From Oz** |
| **1998** (12th) | The Necks | The Boys |
| **1998** (12th) | Cezary Skubiszewski | The Sound of One Hand Clapping |
| **1998** (12th) | Various | A Little Bit of Soul |
| **1998** (12th) | Various | To Hal and Bacharach |
**1999** (13th); Soundtrack
| **1999** (13th); Soundtrack | **David Hirschfelder** | **Elizabeth** |
| **1999** (13th); Soundtrack | Felicity Fox | Afrika - Cape Town to Cairo |
| **1999** (13th); Soundtrack | David Hirschfelder | The Interview |
| **1999** (13th); Soundtrack | Various | Praise |
| **1999** (13th); Soundtrack | Various | Two Hands |
**1999** (13th); Cast/Show
| **1999** (13th); Cast/Show | **Judi Connelli & Suzanne Johnston** | **Perfect Strangers** |
| **1999** (13th); Cast/Show | Bananas in Pyjamas | It's Show Time! |
| **1999** (13th); Cast/Show | Opera Australia, Christine Douglas & Suzanne Johnston | Hansel & Gretel |
| **1999** (13th); Cast/Show | State Orchestra of Victoria | Rudolf Nureyev's Don Quixote |
**2000** (14th); Soundtrack
| **2000** (14th); Soundtrack | **David Bridie** | **In a Savage Land** |
| **2000** (14th); Soundtrack | Iva Davies | The Ghost of Time |
| **2000** (14th); Soundtrack | Paul Grabowsky | Siam Sunset |
| **2000** (14th); Soundtrack | Various | Soft Fruit |
| **2000** (14th); Soundtrack | Various | The Wog Boy |
| **2000** (14th); Soundtrack | David Hirschfelder & Various Artists | What Becomes of the Broken Hearted? |
**2000** (14th); Cast/Show
| **2000** (14th); Cast/Show | **Australian Cast Recording** | **The Sound of Music** |
| **2000** (14th); Cast/Show | John Farnham | Live at the Regent |
| **2000** (14th); Cast/Show | State Orchestra of Victoria, John Lanchbery | The Merry Widow |
| **2000** (14th); Cast/Show | Various | Happy Days - The Arena Mega Musical |
**2001** (15th); Soundtrack
| **2001** (15th); Soundtrack | **Melbourne Symphony Orchestra, Various** | **Music from the Motion Picture – The Dish** |
| **2001** (15th); Soundtrack | David Hirschfelder, Various | Better Than Sex - Original Soundtrack |
| **2001** (15th); Soundtrack | Lisa Gerrard with Hans Zimmer | More Music from Gladiator |
| **2001** (15th); Soundtrack | Richard Pleasance, Various | The Very Best of SeaChange |
| **2001** (15th); Soundtrack | Single Gun Theory | The Monkey's Mask |
| **2001** (15th); Soundtrack | Various | Sydney 2000 The Games of the XXVII Olympiad - Official Music from the Opening Ceremony |
**2001** (15th); Cast/Show
| **2001** (15th); Cast/Show | **Original Cast Recording** | **Shout! The Legend Of The Wild One** |
| **2001** (15th); Cast/Show | Australian Concert Orchestra, Queensland Pops Orchestra, Harper | Scotland the Brave |
| **2001** (15th); Cast/Show | David Chesworth | Wicked Voice |
| **2001** (15th); Cast/Show | Janet Seidel | Doris and Me |
| **2001** (15th); Cast/Show | Various | Sydney 2000 The Games of the XXVII Olympiad - Official Music from the Opening Ceremony |
**2002** (16th); Soundtrack
| **2002** (16th); Soundtrack | **Paul Kelly, Shane O' Mara, Steve Hadley, Bruce Haymes, Peter Luscombe** | **Lantana** |
| **2002** (16th); Soundtrack | Graham Tardif & Rolf de Heer (composers), Archie Roach (performer) | The Tracker |
| **2002** (16th); Soundtrack | David Thrussell | The Hard Word |
| **2002** (16th); Soundtrack | Mario Millo | Changi |
| **2002** (16th); Soundtrack | Various | Dirty Deeds |
**2002** (16th); Cast/Show
| **2002** (16th); Cast/Show | **Various** | **The Man from Snowy River: Arena Spectacular** |
| **2002** (16th); Cast/Show | Judi Connelli | Back to Before |
| **2002** (16th); Cast/Show | Opera Australia, Simone Young | Verdi: Requiem |
| **2002** (16th); Cast/Show | Original Australian Cast Recording | The Wizard of Oz |
| **2002** (16th); Cast/Show | Play Act One | Story of Abbey |
**2003** (17th); Soundtrack
| **2003** (17th); Soundtrack | **Mick Harvey** | **Australian Rules** |
| **2003** (17th); Soundtrack | Cezary Skubiszewski | After the Deluge (Original Television Mini-series Soundtrack) |
| **2003** (17th); Soundtrack | Dave Graney & Clare Moore | Music from the Motion Picture - Bad Eggs |
| **2003** (17th); Soundtrack | The Saddle Club | On Top of the World |
| **2003** (17th); Soundtrack | Various Artists | The Secret Life of Us Volume 3 |
| **2003** (17th); Cast/Show | **Various** | **Long Way to the Top – Live in Concert** |
**2004** (18th)
| **2004** (18th) | **David Bridie** | **Nautical Forlorn** |
| **2004** (18th) | Australian Chamber Orchestra | Musical Renegades |
| **2004** (18th) | Decoder Ring | Somersault |
| **2004** (18th) | Elizabeth Drake | Japanese Story |
| **2004** (18th) | Various | Australian Idol Final 12 |
**2005** (19th)
| **2005** (19th) | **Severed Heads** | **The Illustrated Family Doctor** |
| **2005** (19th) | Art Phillips | Outback House |
| **2005** (19th) | Ben Mingay & Deone Zanotto | Dirty Dancing - The Classic Story on Stage |
| **2005** (19th) | Roger Mason | The Extra |
| **2005** (19th) | Various Artists | Deck Dogz |
**2006** (20th)
| **2006** (20th) | **Paul Kelly, Dan Luscombe, Katie Brianna & the Stormwater Boys** | **Jindabyne soundtrack** |
| **2006** (20th) | David Bridie | RAN – soundtrack |
| **2006** (20th) | Nick Cave, Warren Ellis | The Proposition |
| **2006** (20th) | François Tétaz | Wolf Creek – original motion picture soundtrack |
| **2006** (20th) | Various | Little Fish – soundtrack |
**2007** (21st)
| **2007** (21st) | **Choir of Hard Knocks** | **Choir of Hard Knocks** |
| **2007** (21st) | David Bridie | Gone |
| **2007** (21st) | Monsieur Camembert | Famous Blue Cheese |
| **2007** (21st) | David Bridie | The Circuit |
| **2007** (21st) | Various | The Countdown Spectacular Live |
**2008** (22nd)
| **2008** (22nd) | **Chris Lilley** | **Summer Heights High soundtrack** |
| **2008** (22nd) | Cezary Skubiszewski | Night – original soundtrack |
| **2008** (22nd) | Cast of Priscilla Queen of the Desert - the Musical | Priscilla Queen of the Desert - the Musical |
| **2008** (22nd) | Ben Lee and Jessica Chapnik | The Square – original soundtrack |
| **2008** (22nd) | Various | Countdown Spectacular 2 |
**2009** (23rd)
| **2009** (23rd) | **Soundtrack** | **Balibo** |
| **2009** (23rd) | Amanda Brown | Son of a Lion – original soundtrack |
| **2009** (23rd) | Soundtrack | Samson and Delilah |
| **2009** (23rd) | Soundtrack | East of Everything – series two soundtrack album |
| **2009** (23rd) | Tex Perkins, Murray Paterson | Beautiful Kate |
**2010** (24th)
| **2010** (24th) | **Triple J** | **Before Too Long: Triple J's Tribute to Paul Kelly** |
| **2010** (24th) | Burkhard Dallwitz | Underbelly |
| **2010** (24th) | Christopher Gordon & Various Artists | Mao's Last Dancer |
| **2010** (24th) | Various Artists | Bran Nue Dae |
| **2010** (24th) | Various Artists | Accidents Happen |
**2011** (25th)
| **2011** (25th) | **Chris Lilley** | **Angry Boys – Official Soundtrack Album** |
| **2011** (25th) | Jed Kurzel | Snowtown |
| **2011** (25th) | Stephen Pigram, Alan Pigram, Alex Lloyd | Mad Bastards – Music from the Motion Picture |
| **2011** (25th) | Sydney Symphony & cast, Alexander Briger (conductor) | Don John of Austria |
| **2011** (25th) | Various Artists – Original Australian Cast Recording | Mary Poppins |
**2012** (26th)
| **2012** (26th) | **Triple J** | **Straight to You – Triple J's Tribute to Nick Cave** |
| **2012** (26th) | Jane Rutter | An Australian in Paris |
| **2012** (26th) | RocKwiz | The RocKwiz Christmas Album |
| **2012** (26th) | Jon English & the Original Cast of the Rock Show | The Rock Show |
| **2012** (26th) | Various Artists | The Sapphires Original Soundtrack |
**2013** (27th)
| **2013** (27th) | **Paul Kelly, James Ledger, Genevieve Lacey & ANAM Musicians** | **Conversations with Ghosts** |
| **2013** (27th) | David Bridie | Satellite Boy |
| **2013** (27th) | Nick Cave and Warren Ellis | Lawless |
| **2013** (27th) | Tina Arena | Symphony of Life |
| **2013** (27th) | Various Artists | triple j's One Night Stand |
**2014** (28th)
| **2014** (28th) | **Geoffrey Gurrumul Yunupingu and the Sydney Symphony Orchestra** | **Gurrumul: His Life And Music** |
| **2014** (28th) | Glenn Shorrock & Brian Cadd | The Story of Sharky and The Caddman |
| **2014** (28th) | Katie Noonan | Fierce Hearts: The Music of Love-Song-Circus |
| **2014** (28th) | Various Artists | Spirit Of Akasha |
| **2014** (28th) | Various Artists | triple j's One Night Stand: Mildura |
**2015** (29th)
| **2015** (29th) | **Various Artists** | **Beat the Drum – Celebrating 40 Years of Triple J** |
| **2015** (29th) | Ed Kuepper | Last Cab to Darwin – Original Motion Picture Soundtrack |
| **2015** (29th) | Melbourne Symphony Orchestra / Nigel Westlake | Paper Planes – Original Motion Picture Soundtrack |
| **2015** (29th) | Opera Australia (Brett Dean / Amanda Holden / Peter Carey) | Bliss |
| **2015** (29th) | Various Artists | The Water Diviner – Original Motion Picture Soundtrack |
**2016** (30th)
| **2016** (30th) | **Josh Pyke & the Sydney Symphony Orchestra** | **Live at the Sydney Opera House** |
| **2016** (30th) | Kate Miller-Heidke | The Rabbits (Original Live Cast Recording) |
| **2016** (30th) | Queensland Symphony Orchestra | Gallipoli Symphony |
| **2016** (30th) | Various Artists | The Divorce (Original Cast Recording) |
| **2016** (30th) | Various Artists | Velvet (The Original Cast Recording) |
**2017** (31st)
| **2017** (31st) | **Nigel Westlake & Sydney Symphony Orchestra, with Joseph Tawadros, Slava Grigoryan & Lior** | **Ali's Wedding (soundtrack)** |
| **2017** (31st) | Australian Cast Recording feat. David Campbell | Dream Lover |
| **2017** (31st) | Cezary Skubiszewski | Red Dog: True Blue (original soundtrack) |
| **2017** (31st) | Jessica Mauboy | The Secret Daughter (Songs from the Original TV Series) |
| **2017** (31st) | Richard Tognetti & Australian Chamber Orchestra | Mountain |
**2018** (32nd)
| **2018** (32nd) | **Jimmy Barnes** | **Working Class Boy: The Soundtracks** |
| **2018** (32nd) | Evelyn Ida Morris | Acute Misfortune (Original Soundtrack) |
| **2018** (32nd) | Jessica Mauboy | The Secret Daughter Season Two (Songs for the Original 7 Series) |
| **2018** (32nd) | Liars | 1/1 (Original Soundtrack) |
| **2018** (32nd) | Various Artists | Muriel's Wedding: The Musical (The Original Cast Recording) |
**2019** (33rd)
| **2019** (33rd) | **Various Artists** | **The Recording Studio (Music From The TV Series)** |
| **2019** (33rd) | Burkhard Dallwitz | LOCUSTS: Original Motion Picture Soundtrack |
| **2019** (33rd) | Gang of Youths | MTV Unplugged (Live in Melbourne) |
| **2019** (33rd) | Luke Howard | The Sand That Ate the Sea |
| **2019** (33rd) | Trials | Cargo |
**2020** (34th)
| **2020** (34th) | **Chelsea Cullen** | **I Am Woman (Original Motion Picture Soundtrack)** |
| **2020** (34th) | Dan Golding | Untitled Goose Game (Original Soundtrack) |
| **2020** (34th) | Grigoryan Brothers | A Boy Called Sailboat |
| **2020** (34th) | Matteo Zingales & Antony Partos | Mystery Road (Original Score: Seasons 1-2) |
| **2020** (34th) | Sally Seltmann & Darren Seltmann | The Letdown (Music from Seasons 1+2) |
**2021** (35th)
| **2021** (35th) | **Angus & Julia Stone** | **Life Is Strange** |
| **2021** (35th) | Antony Partos | Rams (Original Motion Picture Score) |
| **2021** (35th) | Caitlin Yeo, Maria Alfonsine, Damian de Boos-Smith | Wakefield (Season One Official Soundtrack) |
| **2021** (35th) | Sia | Music – Songs from and Inspired by the Motion Picture |
| **2021** (35th) | Yve Blake | Fangirls |
**2022** (36th)
| **2022** (36th) | **Australian Chamber Orchestra and Richard Tognetti** | **River (Original Motion Picture Soundtrack)** |
| **2022** (36th) | Brett Aplin | No Mercy, No Remorse (Original Score) |
| **2022** (36th) | In Hearts Wake | Green Is the New Black |
| **2022** (36th) | Maria Alfonsine with Itunu Pepper | Akoni (Original Motion Picture Soundtrack) |
| **2022** (36th) | Matteo Zingales | A Fire Inside (Original Motion Picture Soundtrack) |
**2023** (37th)
| **2023** (37th) | **Various Artists** | **John Farnham: Finding the Voice (Music from the Feature Documentary)** |
| **2023** (37th) | Brett Aplin and Burkhard Dallwitz | Splice Here: A Projected Odyssey (Original Motion Picture Soundtrack) |
| **2023** (37th) | Helena Czajka | Unseen Skies (Original Score Soundtrack) |
| **2023** (37th) | Nigel Westlake, Melbourne Symphony Orchestra and Benjamin Northey | Blueback (Original Motion Picture Soundtrack) |
| **2023** (37th) | Sophie Payton (Gordi), Jason Fernandez | Ride (Music from the Film) |
**2024** (38th)
| **2024** (38th) | **Various Artists** | **Faraway Downs** |
| **2024** (38th) | Ack Kinmonth | Scarygirl |
| **2024** (38th) | Harlow | This is Harlow (Music From Paper Dolls) |
| **2024** (38th) | Helena Czajka | Nemesis (Original Series Soundtrack) |
| **2024** (38th) | Jackson Milas | The Way, My Way |
**2025** (39th)
| **2025** (39th) | **Various Artists** | **How to Make Gravy** |
| **2025** (39th) | Australian Chamber Orchestra | Memoir of a Snail (Original Motion Picture Soundtrack) |
| **2025** (39th) | François Tétaz | The Surfer |
| **2025** (39th) | Michael Cassel Group | Michael Cassel Group Presents a (Very) Musical Christmas |
| **2025** (39th) | Vidya Makan | The Lucky Country (Original Cast Album) |
**2026** (40th)
| **2026** (40th) | **Francois Tetaz** | **My Brilliant Career** |
| **2026** (40th) | Ack Kinmonth | The Pout-Pout Fish (Original Motion Picture Soundtrack) |
| **2026** (40th) | Amanda Brown | Deadloch Season 1 |
| **2026** (40th) | Brian Cachia | Beast (Original Motion Picture Score) |
| **2026** (40th) | Caitlin Yeo | Every Little Thing (Official Motion Picture Soundtrack) |
