= The Habibis =

- Genres: Greek traditional
- Years active: 1995–2001, 2006–present

The Habibis (stylised as The haBiBis) are an Australian band that plays traditional Greek music. They won the ARIA Award for Best World Music Album with their album Intoxication.

== Members ==
- Irine Vela - laouto, bouzouki, guitar
- Pascal Latra - vocals, baglama, percussion
- Mulaim Vela - guitar
- Rachel Cogan - recorder
- Achilles Yiangoulli - bouzouki, vocals, percussion
- Wendy Rowlands - violin
- Sotiris Traianopoulos - clarinet
- Jenny M Thomas - violin
- Zois Tzikas - percussion

== Discography ==
=== Albums ===
List of albums
Title	Album details
Four Warriors	Released: 1995; Label: The Habibis (HAB 001C); Formats: CD, Cassette
Intoxication	Released: 1998; Label: Larrikin Records (LRF511); Formats: CD
Selections 1995-2006	Released: 2008; Label: (TN755-83); Formats: CD

== Awards and nominations ==
=== ARIA Music Awards ===
The ARIA Music Awards is an annual awards ceremony that recognises excellence, innovation, and achievement across all genres of Australian music. They commenced in 1987. The Cat Empire has won one award.

Year	Nominee / work	Award	Result	Ref.
1999	Intoxication	Best World Music Album	Won	
