= 1999 ARIA Music Awards =

Annual Australian music awards

- Date: 12 October 1999
- Venue: Sydney Entertainment Centre, Sydney, New South Wales

Highlights
- Most wins: Powderfinger (4)
- Most nominations: Silverchair (9)
- Website: ariaawards.com.au

Television/radio coverage
- Network: Network Ten

The 13th Australian Recording Industry Association Music Awards (generally known as the ARIA Music Awards or simply the ARIAs) was held on 12 October 1999 at the Sydney Entertainment Centre. Hosted by Paul McDermott and Bob Downe, and presenters, including Melanie C of the Spice Girls, Tina Cousins, Fiona Horne and Molly Meldrum, distributed 33 awards. The big winner for the year was Powderfinger with four awards.

Two new categories, Best Original Cast / Show Recording and Best Blues and Roots Album were created; while Song of the Year (Songwriter), Best Indigenous Release and Best New Talent categories were retired. In addition to the annually presented awards, a Special Achievement Award was received by both recording studio owner Bill Armstrong (see Armstrong Studios) and Fable Record's creator Ron Tudor. An Outstanding Achievement Award was received by Natalie Imbruglia. The ARIA Hall of Fame inducted: Jimmy Little and Richard Clapton.

== Ceremony details ==
The ceremony was hosted by TV comedians, Paul McDermott and Bob Downe, and 33 awards were presented by Melanie C of the Spice Girls, Tina Cousins, Fiona Horne, former Countdown host Molly Meldrum and others.

=== Presenters and performers ===
Presenters and performers were:

Presenter(s)	Performer(s)	Ref.
Harry Connick Jr.	Spiderbait	
The Tea Party	Spiderbait	
Fiona Horne	Powderfinger	
Merrick and Rosso	Powderfinger	
Nick Bennett	Regurgitator	
Dylan Lewis	Regurgitator	
Sarah McLeod	Bachelor Girl	
Leah McLeod	Bachelor Girl	
Troy Cassar-Daley	Human Nature	
Shanley Del	Human Nature	
Garbage	Human Nature	
Melanie C	Frenzal Rhomb – "Never Had So Much Fun"	
Tim Freedman	Frenzal Rhomb – "Never Had So Much Fun"	
Kate Ceberano	Frenzal Rhomb – "Never Had So Much Fun"	
The Living End	Killing Heidi	
Jimmy Barnes	Killing Heidi	

== Awards ==
Final nominees for awards are shown in plain, with winners in bold.

=== ARIA Awards ===
- Album of the Year
  - **Powderfinger – Internationalist**
    - Ben Lee – Breathing Tornados
    - The Living End – The Living End
    - Silverchair – Neon Ballroom
    - Spiderbait – Grand Slam
- Single of the Year
  - **Powderfinger – "The Day You Come"**
    - Josh Abrahams – "Addicted to Bass"
    - Ben Lee – "Cigarettes Will Kill You"
    - Regurgitator – "! (The Song Formerly Known As)"
    - Silverchair – "Ana's Song (Open Fire)"
- Highest Selling Album
  - **John Farnham, Olivia Newton-John, Anthony Warlow – Highlights from The Main Event**
    - Cold Chisel – The Last Wave of Summer
    - Natalie Imbruglia – Left of the Middle
    - Regurgitator – Unit
    - The Living End – The Living End
- Highest Selling Single
  - **Joanne / BZ – "Jackie"**
    - Bachelor Girl – "Buses and Trains"
    - Human Nature – "Last to Know"
    - Savage Garden – "The Animal Song"
    - Silverchair – "Anthem for the Year 2000"
- Best Group
  - **The Living End – The Living End**
    - Powderfinger – Internationalist
    - Regurgitator – "! (The Song Formerly Known As)"
    - Silverchair – Neon Ballroom
    - You Am I – "Heavy Heart"
- Best Female Artist
  - **Natalie Imbruglia – "Wishing I Was There"**
    - Kasey Chambers – The Captain
    - Suze DeMarchi – Telelove
    - Lisa Miller – As Far as a Life Goes
    - Kylie Minogue – "Cowboy Style"
- Best Male Artist
  - **Tim Rogers – What Rhymes with Cars and Girls**
    - Josh Abrahams – Sweet Distorted Holiday
    - Ben Lee – Breathing Tornados
    - Alex Lloyd – "Lucky Star"
    - Paul Kelly – "I'll Be Your Lover"
- Breakthrough Artist – Album
  - **The Living End – The Living End**
    - Bachelor Girl – Waiting for the Day
    - Gerling – Children of Telepathic Experiences
    - Not from There – Sand on Seven
    - Marie Wilson – Real Life
- Breakthrough Artist – Single
  - **Alex Lloyd – "Lucky Star"**
  - **Taxiride – "Get Set"**
    - Frenzal Rhomb – "You Are Not My Friend"
    - Gerling – "Enter, Space Capsule"
    - Not from There – "Sich Offnen"
- Best Dance Release
  - **Josh Abrahams – Sweet Distorted Holiday**
    - B(if)tek – "Bedrock"
    - Fatt Dex – Jus' Funkin
    - Honeysmack – Walk on Acid
    - Sonic Animation – "Love Lies Bleeding"
- Best Pop Release
  - **Savage Garden – "The Animal Song"**
    - Bachelor Girl – Waiting for the Day
    - Deadstar – "Run Baby Run"
    - Human Nature – Counting Down
    - Taxiride – "Get Set"
- Best Rock Album
  - **Powderfinger – Internationalist**
    - Cold Chisel – The Last Wave
    - Frenzal Rhomb – A Man's Not a Camel
    - Henry's Anger – Personality Test
    - Silverchair – Neon Ballroom
- Best Country Album
  - **Kasey Chambers – The Captain**
    - Adam Brand – Adam Brand
    - Tania Kernaghan – Dancing on Water
    - Kedron Taylor – Every Place I Go
    - Various – Not So Dusty
- Best Blues & Roots Album
  - **David Hole – Under the Spell**
    - The Backsliders – Poverty Deluxe
    - Jeff Lang – Cedar Grove
    - Kerri Simpson – Confessin' the Blues
    - Weddings Parties Anything – They Were Better Live
- Best Independent Release
  - **Josh Abrahams – Sweet Distorted Holiday**
    - Crawlspace – "Away"
    - Diana Ah Naid – "Oh No (Curbside Lullaby)"
    - Pauline Pantsdown – "I Don't Like It"
    - Pre-Shrunk – "Triple A Side"
- Best Alternative Release
  - **Not from There – Sand on Seven**
    - Gerling – Children of Telepathic Experiences
    - Tim Rogers – What Rhymes with Cars and Girls
    - Something for Kate – Beautiful Sharks
    - Spiderbait – Grand Slam
    - Tendrills – Soaking Red
- Best Adult Contemporary Album
  - **Jimmy Little – Messenger**
    - Frank Bennett – Cash Landing
    - The Black Sorrows – Beat Club
    - John Farnham, Olivia Newton-John, Anthony Warlow – Highlights from The Main Event
    - Renée Geyer – Sweet Life
- Best Comedy Release
  - **Martin/Molloy** – **Eat Your Peas**
    - Judith Lucy – King of the Road
    - Merrick and Rosso – Teenage Mullet Fury
    - Pauline Pantsdown – "I Don't Like It"
    - Rodney Rude – More Grunt

=== Fine Arts Awards ===
- Best Jazz Album
  - **Andrew Speight Quartet – Andrew Speight Quartet**
    - Browne Haywood Stevens – Sudden in a Shaft of Sunlight
    - Jamie Oehlers – Strut
    - Janet Seidel – The Way You Wear Your Hat
    - Scott Tinkler Trio – Sofa King
- Best Classical Album
  - **Gerard Willems – Piano: Beethoven Sonatas Volume 1**
    - Tamara Anna Cislowska – Piano: The Russian Album
    - Paul Dean (clarinet) Queensland Symphony Orchestra, Richard Mills – Ariel's Music
    - Melbourne Symphony Orchestra, Vernon Handley – The Eternal Rhythm
    - Sara Macliver (soprano), Australian Brandenburg Orchestra, Paul Dyer – If Love's a Sweet Passion
- Best Children's Album
  - **The Hooley Dooleys – Pop**
    - Australian Girls Choir & National Boys Choir – Australian Christmas Spirit
    - Cubbyhouse – Rock Cake
    - Franciscus Henri – Hooray for Mr Whiskers
    - Monica Trapaga – Monica's Trip to the Moon
- Best Original Cast / Show Recording
  - **Judi Connelli & Suzanne Johnston – Perfect Strangers**
    - Bananas in Pyjamas – It's Show Time!
    - Opera Australia, Christine Douglas & Suzanne Johnston – Hansel & Gretel
    - State Orchestra of Victoria – Rudolf Nureyev's Don Quixote
- Best Original Soundtrack Recording
  - **David Hirschfelder – Elizabeth**
    - Felicity Fox – Afrika - Cape Town to Cairo
    - David Hirschfelder – The Interview
    - Various – Praise
    - Various – Two Hands
- Best World Music Album
  - **The Habibis – Intoxication**
    - Lajamanu Teenage Band – Vision
    - Sirocco – Falling Leaf
    - Voices from the Vacant Lot – Dance on Your Bones
    - Xylouris Ensemble – Drakos

=== Artisan Awards ===
- Producer of the Year
  - **Bachelor Girl – Bachelor Girl – Waiting for the Day**
    - Paul Begaud – Felicity – We'll Never Get Along; – Human Nature – "Now that I've Found You", "Depend on Me", "Last to Know", "Be There with You"
    - Nick Launay – Primary – "Supposed to Be Here", "24000", "This Is the Sound", "Come to Take You Home"; – Silverchair – Neon Ballroom
    - Magoo – Automatic – "Pump it Up"; – Custard – "Loverama"; – Not from There – Sand on Seven
    - Phil McKellar – Spiderbait – Grand Slam
- Engineer of the Year
  - **Nick Launay – Primary – "Supposed to Be Here", "24000", "This Is the Sound", "Come to Take You Home"; – Silverchair – Neon Ballroom**
    - Josh Abrahams – Josh Abrahams – Sweet, Distorted Holiday
    - Magoo – Automatic – "Pump it Up"; – Midnight Oil – Redneck Wonderland
    - Phil McKellar – Spiderbait – Grand Slam
    - Kalju Tonuma – 28 Days – Kid Indestructible; – Felicity Hunter – "Hardcore Adore"; – The Mavis's – "Puberty Song"
- Best Video
  - **Andrew Lancaster, David McCormick – Custard – "Girls Like That..."**
    - Cate Anderson – Silverchair – "Ana's Song (Open Fire)"
    - Andrew Dominik – The Cruel Sea – "You'll Do"
    - Craig Melville, David Curry – Josh Abrahams – "Addicted to Bass"
    - Tony McGrath – Regurgitator – "! (The Song Formerly Known As)"
- Best Cover Art
  - **Kevin Wilkins – Powderfinger – Internationalist**
    - Janet English, George Stajsic – Spiderbait – Grand Slam
    - Reg Mombassa – Mental As Anything – Garage
    - John Watson, Kevin Wilkins, Melissa Chenery – Silverchair – Neon Ballroom
    - Quan Yeomans, Janet English – Happyland – Welcome to Happyland

== Achievement awards ==
=== Outstanding Achievement Award ===
- Natalie Imbruglia: recognises her international chart and sales success of her single, "Torn" (October 1997) and the related album, Left of the Middle (November 1997).

=== Special Achievement Award ===
- Bill Armstrong: received for the establishment of his Armstrong Studios, which provided "[the] introduction of Multi Track Recording in Australia... the first 8-track recorded into Australia, then 16- and 24-track machines together with State of the Art mixing desks."
- Ron Tudor: "[his] involvement in the development of the Australian Recording Industry is well recognised throughout Australia and overseas... his greatest moments have been in witnessing the growth and success of our industry and many of Australia's very first recording artists climb their way to recognition at home and overseas."

== ARIA Hall of Fame inductees ==
The Hall of Fame inductees were:

- Richard Clapton inducted by INXS member, Andrew Farriss. When previewing his induction, Clapton observed, "That's very apt. Especially since I wrote a really good song with Andrew a few months ago."
- Jimmy Little
