= ARIA Award for Best World Music Album =

Annual award by ARIA Music Awards

- 2026 winner Not Drowning, Waving
- Country: Australia
- Presented by: Australian Recording Industry Association (ARIA)
- First award: 1995
- Currently held by: Not Drowning, Waving – Malira (2026)

Highlights
- Most wins: Joseph Tawadros (7)
- Most nominations: Joseph Tawadros (20)
- Website: ariaawards.com.au

The ARIA Music Award for Best World Music Album, is an award presented within the Fine Arts Awards at the annual ARIA Music Awards. It was inaugurated in 1995 as Best Folk/World/Traditional Release. The ARIA Awards recognise "the many achievements of Aussie artists across all music genres", and have been given by the Australian Recording Industry Association (ARIA) since 1987.

Album recordings by a group or solo artist are eligible. The award is handed out for an indigenous, ethnic, folk or cross-cultural recording, and cannot be entered into any other genre category. The final nominees and winner are chosen by a judging school, which comprises between 40 and 100 members of representatives experienced in this genre.

Oud virtuoso Joseph Tawadros has won the category seven times from twenty nominations, more than any other artist, including consecutive wins from 2012 to 2014 and again from 2020 to 2023. Yolngu singer-songwriter-guitarist Geoffrey Gurrumul Yunupingu won all five of his nominations as a solo artist, two of which were posthumous, while gypsy fusion band Monsieur Camembert have won all three of their nominations, including consecutive wins in 2002 and 2003.

== Nominees and winners ==
In the following table, the winner is highlighted in a separate colour, and in boldface; the nominees are those that are not highlighted or in boldface.

Winner marked in a separate colour

Year	Artist(s)	Album Title
**1995** (9th)
**1995** (9th)	**Yungchen Lhamo**	**Tibetan Prayer**
**1995** (9th)	Bu Baca Diop	Stand
**1995** (9th)	The Celts	The Rocky Road
**1995** (9th)	Nomad	Nomad
**1995** (9th)	Sirocco	The Wetland Suite
**1995** (9th)	Various^{[A]}	Tribal Heart
**1996** (10th)
**1996** (10th)	**Mara!**	**Ruino Vino**
**1996** (10th)	Cafe of the Gate of Salvation	A Window in Heaven
**1996** (10th)	Dead Can Dance	Spiritchaser
**1996** (10th)	Sirocco	Stars and Fires
**1996** (10th)	Various^{[B]}	Womadelaide '95
**1997** (11th)
**1997** (11th)	**George Telek**	**Telek**
**1997** (11th)	Ashok Roy	The Night Ragas
**1997** (11th)	The Barkers	The Black Joke
**1997** (11th)	Equa	Equa
**1997** (11th)	Mara! & Martenitsa Choir	Sezoni
**1998** (12th)
**1998** (12th)	**Kavisha Mazzella**	**Fisherman's Daughter**
**1998** (12th)	Lisa Gerrard and Pieter Bourke	Duality
**1998** (12th)	Matt Walker	I Listen to the Night
**1998** (12th)	Tigramuna	Jazz Latino - Americano
**1998** (12th)	Tulipan	Manic Celeste
**1998** (12th)	Xylouris Ensemble	Antipodes
**1999** (13th)
**1999** (13th)	**Habibis**	**Intoxication**
**1999** (13th)	Lajamanu Teenage Band	Vision
**1999** (13th)	Sirocco	Falling Leaf
**1999** (13th)	Voices from the Vacant Lot	Dance on Your Bones
**1999** (13th)	Xylouris Ensemble	Drakos
**2000** (14th)
**2000** (14th)	**Chris Duncan**	**Fyvies Embrace - The Golden Age of the Scottish Fiddle**
**2000** (14th)	Riley Lee and Marshall McGuire	Spring Sea
**2000** (14th)	Timothy Kain and Virginia Taylor	Music of the Americas
**2000** (14th)	Inka Marka	Auki Auki
**2000** (14th)	Tim Gibuma and the Storm	The Gaba - Gabamawi
**2001** (15th)
**2001** (15th)	**Mara!**	**Live in Europe**
**2001** (15th)	Akin	Undercurrent
**2001** (15th)	Epizo Bangoura and African Express	Inchallah
**2001** (15th)	George Telek	Serious Tam
**2001** (15th)	Xenos	Tutti Frutti
**2002** (16th)
**2002** (16th)	**Monsieur Camembert**	**Live on Stage**
**2002** (16th)	Coda	There Is a Way to Fly
**2002** (16th)	Kim Sanders	You Can't Get There From Here
**2002** (16th)	Nabarlek	Bininj Manborlh / Blackfella Road
**2002** (16th)	Various^{[C]}	Corroboration
**2003** (17th)
**2003** (17th)	**Monsieur Camembert**	**Absynthe**
**2003** (17th)	All India Radio	All India Radio
**2003** (17th)	David Bridie	West Papua: Sound of the Morning Star
**2003** (17th)	Kavisha Mazzella	Silverhook Tango
**2003** (17th)	Zulya	Elusive
**2004** (18th)
**2004** (18th)	**Seaman Dan**	**Perfect Pearl**
**2004** (18th)	Jane Rutter and Slava Grigoryan	Brazil
**2004** (18th)	Joseph Tawadros	Storyteller
**2004** (18th)	Mohamed Bangoura	Djembe Kan
**2004** (18th)	Saltwater Band	Djarridjarri - Blue Flag
**2005** (19th)
**2005** (19th)	**Monsieur Camembert**	**Monsieur Camembert**
**2005** (19th)	Bobby McLeod	Dumaradje
**2005** (19th)	Cosmo Cosmolino	Nektar
**2005** (19th)	Le Tuan Hung and others	On the Wings of a Butterfly
**2005** (19th)	Southern Gospel Choir	Great Day
**2005** (19th)	Various Artists^{[D]}	This Is the Place for a Song
**2006** (20th)
**2006** (20th)	**The Cat Empire**	**Cities: The Cat Empire Project**
**2006** (20th)	Joseph and James Tawadros	Visions
**2006** (20th)	Mara!	Sorella
**2006** (20th)	The Pigram Brothers	Under the Mango Tree
**2006** (20th)	Seaman Dan	Island Way
**2007** (21st)
**2007** (21st)	**Zulya and The Children of The Underground**	**3 Nights**
**2007** (21st)	Coco's Lunch	Blueprint
**2007** (21st)	Coda	Calling Mission Mu
**2007** (21st)	Joseph Tawadros	Epiphany
**2007** (21st)	Not Drowning, Waving	Maps for Sonic Adventures
**2008** (22nd)
**2008** (22nd)	**Geoffrey Gurrumul Yunupingu**	**Gurrumul**
**2008** (22nd)	Archie Roach	Journey
**2008** (22nd)	David Jones	Colours of the Drum
**2008** (22nd)	Joseph Tawadros	Angel
**2008** (22nd)	Watussi	Tequila, Sangre y Fuego
**2009** (23rd)
**2009** (23rd)	**Seaman Dan**	**Sailing Home**
**2009** (23rd)	Fiona Joy Hawkins	Blue Dream
**2009** (23rd)	Kamerunga	The Push
**2009** (23rd)	Warren Fahey	Australia: Folk Songs & Bush Verse
**2009** (23rd)	Wicked Beat Sound System	Dreaming
**2010** (24th)
**2010** (24th)	**Mamadou Diabate, Bobby Singh** and **Jeff Lang**	**Djan Djan**
**2010** (24th)	Archie Roach	Music Deli Presents Archie Roach
**2010** (24th)	Joseph Tawadros	The Prophet: Music Inspired by the Poetry of Kahlil Gibran
**2010** (24th)	The Public Opinion Afro Orchestra	Do Anything Go Anywhere
**2010** (24th)	Xavier Rudd	Koonyum Sun
**2011** (25th)
**2011** (25th)	**Geoffrey Gurrumul Yunupingu**	**Rrakala**
**2011** (25th)	David Bridie, Hein Arumisore, Jacob Rumbiak, Ronny Kareni and Donny Roem	Strange Birds in Paradise: A West Papuan Soundtrack
**2011** (25th)	Saltwater Band	Malk
**2011** (25th)	The Shaolin Afronauts	Flight of the Ancients
**2011** (25th)	Slava and Leonard Grigoryan, James and Joseph Tawadros	Band of Brothers
**2012** (26th)
**2012** (26th)	**Joseph Tawadros**	**Concerto of the Greater Sea**
**2012** (26th)	Dead Can Dance	Anastasis
**2012** (26th)	Nicky Bomba's Bustamento	Intrepid Adventures to the Lost Riddim Island
**2012** (26th)	Sarah Calderwood	As Night Falls
**2012** (26th)	Warren H Williams & the Warumungu Songmen	Winanjjara: The Song Peoples Sessions
**2013** (27th)
**2013** (27th)	**Joseph Tawadros**	**Chameleons of the White Shadow**
**2013** (27th)	Airileke	Weapon of Choice
**2013** (27th)	Rasa Duende	Improvisations
**2013** (27th)	Shellie Morris and The Borroloola Songwomen	Together We Are Strong – Ngambala Wigi Li – Wun the Song Peoples Sessions
**2013** (27th)	Various^{[E]}	Mélodie Française
**2014** (28th)
**2014** (28th)	**Joseph Tawadros**	**Permission to Evaporate**
**2014** (28th)	Astronomy Class	Mekong Delta Sunrise
**2014** (28th)	Jane Rutter	Flute Spirit: Dreams and Improvisations
**2014** (28th)	The Barons of Tang	Into the Mouths of Hungry Giants
**2014** (28th)	William Barton	Birdsong at Dusk
**2015** (29th)
**2015** (29th)	**Geoffrey Gurrumul Yunupingu**	**The Gospel Album**
**2015** (29th)	Baby et Lulu	Album Deux
**2015** (29th)	Christine Anu	Island Christmas
**2015** (29th)	Genevieve Lacey / James Crabb	Heard This and Thought of You
**2015** (29th)	Joseph Tawadros	Truth Seekers, Lovers and Warriors
**2016** (30th)
**2016** (30th)	**Melbourne Ska Orchestra**	**Sierra Kilo Alpha**
**2016** (30th)	Gawurra	Ratja Yaliyali
**2016** (30th)	Joseph Tawadros	World Music
**2016** (30th)	Paul Grabowsky / Monash Art Ensemble / Daniel Ngukurr Boy Wilfred / David Yipininy Wilfred	Nyilipidgi
**2016** (30th)	Seaman Dan	An Old Man of the Sea
**2017** (31st)
**2017** (31st)	**Katie Noonan and Karin Schaupp**	**Songs of the Latin Skies**
**2017** (31st)	Joseph Tawadros	Live at Abbey Road
**2017** (31st)	Melbourne Ska Orchestra	Saturn Return
**2017** (31st)	Slava Grigoryan & Australian String Quartet	Migration
**2017** (31st)	Xylouris White	Black Peak
**2018** (32nd)
**2018** (32nd)	**Geoffrey Gurrumul Yunupingu**	**Djarimirri (Child of the Rainbow)**
**2018** (32nd)	Joseph Tawadros	The Bluebird, the Mystic and the Fool
**2018** (32nd)	Melbourne Ska Orchestra	Ska Classics
**2018** (32nd)	Mista Savona	Havana Meets Kingston
**2018** (32nd)	Xylouris White	Mother
**2019** (33rd)
**2019** (33rd)	**Melbourne Ska Orchestra**	**One Year of Ska**
**2019** (33rd)	Chaika	Arrow
**2019** (33rd)	Joseph Tawadros	Betrayal of a Sacred Sunflower
**2019** (33rd)	Tara Tiba	Omid
**2019** (33rd)	Zela Margossian Quintet	Transition
**2020** (34th)
**2020** (34th)	**Joseph Tawadros**	**Live at the Sydney Opera House**
**2020** (34th)	Grace Barbé	FANM:WOMAN
**2020** (34th)	Melbourne Ska Orchestra	Live at the Triffid
**2020** (34th)	The Crooked Fiddle Band	Another Subtle Atom Bomb
**2020** (34th)	Xylouris White	The Sisypheans
**2021** (35th)
**2021** (35th)	**Joseph Tawadros**	**Hope in an Empty City**
**2021** (35th)	Bob Weatherall & Halfway with William Barton	Restless Dream
**2021** (35th)	Bukhchuluun Ganburged	The Journey
**2021** (35th)	Eishan Ensemble	Project Masnavi
**2021** (35th)	Kuya James	ISA
**2022** (36th)
**2022** (36th)	**Joseph Tawadros with William Barton**	**History Has a Heartbeat**
**2022** (36th)	Australian Art Orchestra, Daniel Wilfred, Sunny Kim, Peter Knight & Aviva Endean	Hand to Earth
**2022** (36th)	Mista Savona	Havana Meets Kingston Part 2
**2022** (36th)	Parvyn	Sa
**2022** (36th)	William Barton and Véronique Serret	Heartland
**2023** (37th)
**2023** (37th)	**Joseph Tawadros**	**Those Who Came Before Us**
**2023** (37th)	Byron Mark	Odyssey
**2023** (37th)	East of West	Moving Home
**2023** (37th)	Mick Dick	Id of RA
**2023** (37th)	Songs of Disappearance	Australian Frog Calls
**2024** (38th)
**2024** (38th)	**Dobby**	**Warrangu: River Story**
**2024** (38th)	Christine Anu	Waku: Minaral a Minalay
**2024** (38th)	Joseph Tawadros	The Virtue of Signals
**2024** (38th)	Radical Son	Bilambiyal
**2024** (38th)	Soweto Gospel Choir & Groove Terminator	History of House
**2025** (39th)
**2025** (39th)	**Gurrumul**	**Banbirrngu - The Orchestral Sessions**
**2025** (39th)	Electric Fields and Melbourne Symphony Orchestra	Live in Concert
**2025** (39th)	Joseph Tawadros	The Forgotten Path to Humanity
**2025** (39th)	Tenzin Choegyal	Snow Flower
**2025** (39th)	The Cat Empire	Bird in Paradise
**2026** (40th)
**2026** (40th)	**Not Drowning, Waving**	**Malira**
**2026** (40th)	Melbourne Ska Orchestra	Monte Loco Rides Again
**2026** (40th)	Mo'Ju, Nicholas Buc and Melbourne Symphony Orchestra	Double J Live at the Wireless – Hammer Hall, Melbourne 2023
**2026** (40th)	Tenzin Choegyal and Philip Glass	Be the Sky
**2026** (40th)	The Cat Empire	Live at Sydney Opera House

== Artists with multiple wins ==
7 wins

- Joseph Tawadros

5 wins

- Geoffrey Gurrumul Yunupingu

3 wins

- Monsieur Camembert

2 wins

- Mara!
- Melbourne Ska Orchestra
- Seaman Dan

== Artists with multiple nominations ==
20 nominations

- Joseph Tawadros

7 nominations

- Nicky Bomba (Note: Including six as a member of Melbourne Ska Orchestra.)
- Geoffrey Gurrumul Yunupingu (Note: Including two as a member of Saltwater Band.)
- Melbourne Ska Orchestra

5 nominations

- David Bridie (Note: Including the various artists album Corroboration and two nominations as a member of Not Drowning, Waving.)
- Giorgos Xylouris (Note: Two as the leader of the Xylouris Ensemble and three as a member of Xylouris White.)

4 nominations

- William Barton
- Mara!
- Seaman Dan

3 nominations

- The Cat Empire
- Lisa Gerrard (Note: Including two as a member of Dead Can Dance.)
- Slava Grigoryan
- Kavisha Mazzella (Note: Including the various artists album This Is the Place for a Song.)
- Monsieur Camembert
- Katie Noonan (Note: Including the various artists albums Corroboration and Mélodie Française, the former as a member of George.)
- Archie Roach (Note: Including the various artists album Corroboration.)
- Sirocco
- Xylouris White

2 nominations

- Christine Anu
- Tenzin Choegyal
- Coda
- Dead Can Dance
- Inka Marka
- Yungchen Lhamo (Note: Including the various artists album Womadelaide '95.)
- Melbourne Symphony Orchestra
- Not Drowning, Waving
- Jane Rutter
- Saltwater Band
- Mista Savona
- James Tawadros
- George Telek
- Wicked Beat Sound System
- Daniel Wilfred
- Xylouris Ensemble
- Zulya

== Notes ==
A: The musical artists featured on Tribal Heart are: Blek Bala Mujik, Moana and the Moahunters, Fontom From, Willie Hona, I Land, Joe T (Richmond Acheampong), Larry Maluma and Kalimba, Valanga Khoza and Saffika, Herbs, Ron Jemmott and Un Tabu, Shango, Denis Gonzalez, Dee Cee Lewis and The Crew, Barike, Musiki Manjaroa and Kakalika.

B: The musical artists featured on Womadelaide 1995 are: Sunrize Band, Zap Mama, Vika and Linda Bull, Hukwe Zawose, Rough Image, Mouth Music, Jah Wobble's Invaders of the Heart, Justin Vali Trio, Sierra Maestra, Geoffrey Oryema, Nusrat Fateh Ali Khan and Yungchen Lhamo.

C: The following musical artists are featured on Corroboration: Deborah Cheetham, Wicked Beat Sound System, Kylie Minogue, Jimmy Little, Jodi Cockatoo Creed, george, The Cruel Sea, Native Ryme, Kev Carmody, Augie March, Archie Roach, Ruby Hunter, Little G, Pound System, Primary, NoKTuRNL, Frank Yamma, David Bridie, Pnau, Stiff Gins, Billie Court, Friendly, Magic Dirt and Richard Frankland.

D: The following music artists are featured on This Is the Place For a Song: Frank Yamma, Vardos, Dili Allstars, Khalli Gudaz, Fazilla Hijeb, Ramen Nawa, Kavisha Mazzella, Mach Pelican, CDB, Inka Marca, Revolucion Street, Neil Nghi Ta, le Nghiem Tran, Dung Nguyen, Musiki Manjaro, Greg Ulfan, Polish Larsen, Takouni and The Five Venoms.

E: The following music artists are featured on Mélodie Française: Gossling, Oh Mercy, The Jezabels, Dappled Cities, Katie Noonan, Lisa Mitchell, Kate Miller-Heidke, Thelma Plum, Husky, Deep Sea Arcade, Megan Washington, Vance Joy, Jonathan Boulet, Edward Deer, Jinja Safari, Okenyo, Big Scary, The Walking Who and Soko.
