= This Is the Place for a Song =

Compilation album by Various Artists
- Released: May 2005
- Genre: Pop
- Length: 60:06
- Label: The Herald and Weekly Times

This Is the Place for a Song or This Is the Place for a Song: A Melbourne Celebration of World Music is a compilation album by various Australian artists, released in May 2005. It consists of 14 cover versions of Melbourne-associated tracks in different styles, with some in different languages. The album was organised by Paul Stewart and Gil Santos (from the Dili Allstars) and it was created to raise awareness of Melbourne's Immigration Museum and was sponsored by the Victorian Multicultural Commission with a grant of $10,000. At the ARIA Music Awards of 2005 it received a nomination for Best World Music Album.

== Track listing ==
This Is the Place for a Song: A Melbourne Celebration of World Music
No.	Title	Writer(s)	Original artist	Length
1.	"All Torn Down" (Frank Yamma)	Chris Cheney, Travis Demsey	The Living End
2.	"I Should Be So Lucky" (Vardos)	Mike Stock, Matt Aitken, Pete Waterman	Kylie Minogue
3.	"Cool World" (Dili Allstars)	Ross Wilson	Mondo Rock
4.	"The Weeping Song" (Khalil Gudaz, Fazila Hijeb, Ramen Nawa)	Nick Cave	Nick Cave and the Bad Seeds
5.	"From Little Things Big Things Grow" (Kavisha Mazzella)	Kev Carmody, Paul Kelly	Paul Kelly & the Messengers
6.	"Beautiful People" (Mach Pelican)	James Reyne, Mark Hudson	Australian Crawl
7.	"Age of Reason" (CDB)	Todd Hunter, Johanna Pigott	John Farnham
8.	"The Carnival Is Over" (Inka Marka)	Tom Springfield (lyrics) / traditional Russian (music)	The Seekers
9.	"Horror Movie" (Revolucion Street)	Greg Macainsh	Skyhooks
10.	"Wings of an Eagle" (Neil Nghi Ta, Le Nghiem Tran, Dung Nguyen)	Russell Morris	Russell Morris
11.	"Who Can It Be Now?" (Musiki Manjaro)	Colin Hay	Men at Work
12.	"Throw Your Arms Around Me" (Greg Ulfan, Polash Larsen)	John Archer, Geoffrey Crosby, Douglas Falconer, Jack Howard, Robert Miles, Mark Seymour, Michael Waters	Hunters & Collectors
13.	"Don't Fall in Love" (Takouni)	Ian Davis, Kenneth Firth	The Ferrets
14.	"Look What You've Done" (The Five Venoms)	Nic Cester	Jet
