= WOMADelaide =

Music and performing arts festival in Australia

- Festival logo
- Genre: Performing arts festival
- Frequency: Annually
- Locations: Botanic Park, Adelaide, South Australia
- Coordinates: 34.914581°S 138.61075°E
- Years active: 13 March 1992 – present
- Inaugurated: 13 March 1992; 34 years ago
- Founders: Peter Gabriel, Thomas Brooman
- Most recent: 6–9 March 2026
- Next event: 5–8 March 2027
- Attendance: 110,000 (2023 - total across the 4 day event, daily capacity is 30,000)
- Organiser: WOMADelaide Foundation
- Website: www.womadelaide.com.au

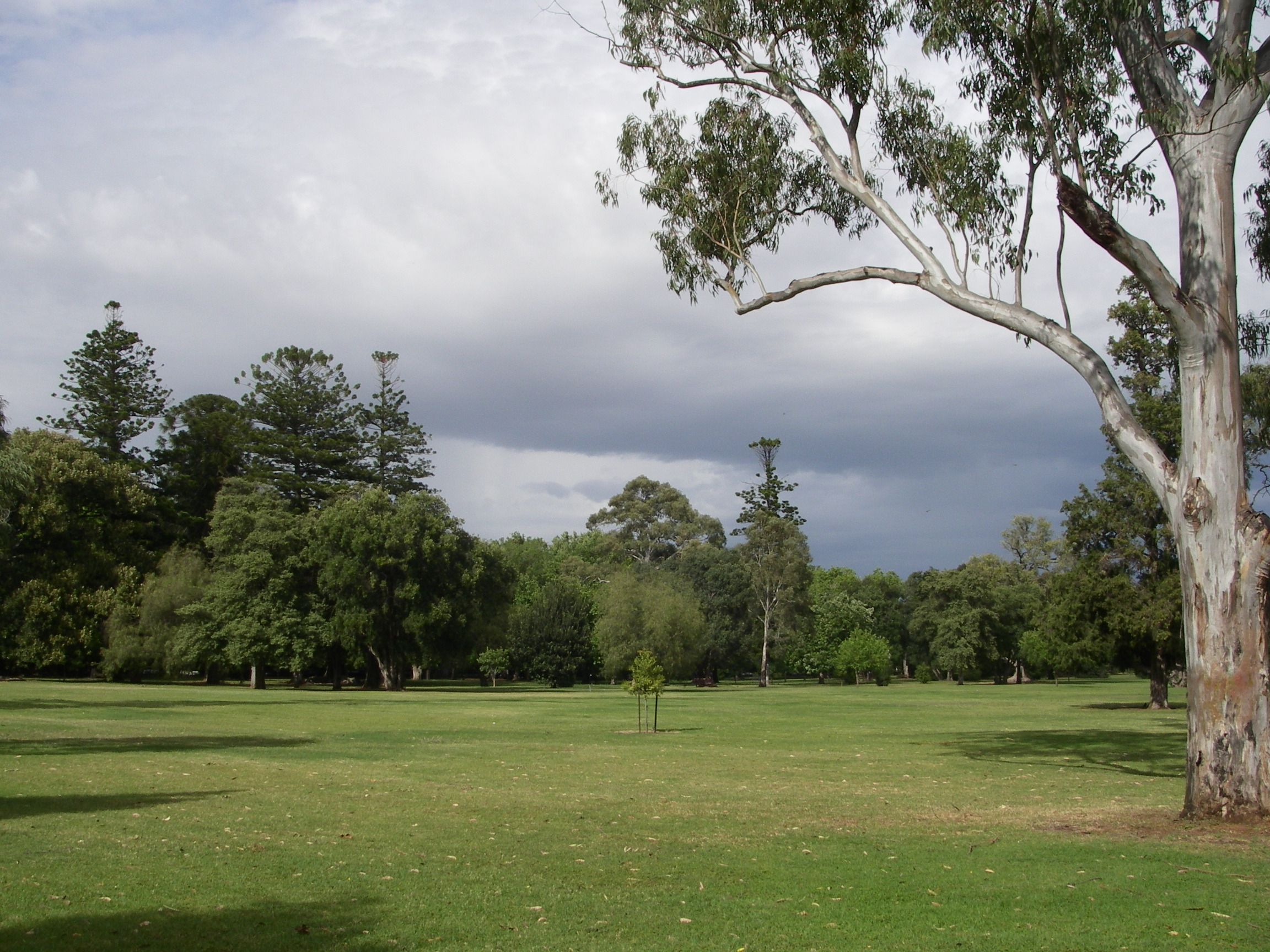
View of Botanic Park

WOMADelaide is an annual four-day festival of music, arts, and dance held in Botanic Park, Adelaide, South Australia which encourages people of all ages and backgrounds to experience the music of cultures other than their own as a way of developing global understanding. Originally presented as part of the 1992 Adelaide Festival in a joint venture with WOMAD in the UK, WOMADelaide is now an independent festival managed by Arts Projects Australia and WOMAD joining multiple iterations of the festival around the world. As well as presenting a selection of music from a wide range of countries and cultures, WOMADelaide also holds side events such as talks and discussions.

WOMADelaide has won a number of awards, including a Helpmann Award for "Best Contemporary Music Festival" in 2008 and 2016, the Australian Event Awards "Best Cultural, Arts or Music Event" in 2015, and the Fowlers Live / SA Music Awards "Best Live Music Event" for five years in a row from 2012 to 2016.

== Festival site ==
WOMADelaide is held in Botanic Park, just north-east of central Adelaide between the Adelaide Zoo and Adelaide Botanic Garden. The 34-hectare (84-acre) park is fenced off for the duration of the festival and the main stages are set up facing outwards from around a backstage compound, with Stage 1 in the middle and Stages 2 and 3 on either side. There are an additional four smaller stages: Zoo Stage; Moreton Bay Stage; and two more stages in Speakers Corner. There are also visual arts exhibitions, a KidZone, a Global Village market area with over 100 food, crafts, and display stalls, as well as several bars. All front-of-stage areas, the KidZone, and the food and drink area are designated smoke-free.

In 2007 WOMADelaide joined forces with Greening Australia, Australia's largest environmental organisation, to reduce the environmental impact of the event. The program has restored over 149 hectares of native biodiverse forests across South Australia in Ngarrindjeri, Peramangk and Nauo Country. 99.5% of event waste is diverted from landfill each year. Since 2026, all stages have been powered by 100% renewable energy using sustainable B100 biodiesel and HVO (hydrotreated vegetable oil).

== Festival format ==
The festival originally ran from 6 pm to 1 am on Friday, from 12 noon until 1 am on Saturday, and from noon until midnight on Sunday. But in 2010 it was extended to include Monday from noon until midnight, making the festival four days in length.

A specific emphasis is placed on hosting traditional music and performances across a range of cultures from all over the world, although some more contemporary, popular acts are also included. Some artists lead workshops on smaller stages to demonstrate and discuss aspects of their performances, while others give roving performances throughout the park or present installation pieces, such as La Compagnie Carabosse's large fire installations at the 2005 festival.

WOMADelaide has grown steadily in audience size from 30,000 in 1993 to over 90,000 across the four day events held annually since 2014. "About 95,000" people attended in 2015, and all prior attendance records were broken in 2016 when over 95,000 people attended over the course of the weekend.

== History ==
=== 1990s ===
WOMADelaide was first run in 1992 as part of the Adelaide Festival of Arts, following an invitation by Rob Brookman to the UK WOMAD organisation to run an event in Adelaide after he had seen the success of other WOMADs in Europe. It was due to be held at Long Gully Oval, Belair National Park on a single stage but was moved to Botanic Park at a late stage due to bush fire threats, and after flyers had been printed. After the threat of bush fires in 1992, the festival officially moved to Botanic Park from 1993, running every two years in odd-numbered years so as not conflict with the Adelaide Festival. 1993 also saw festival founder Peter Gabriel appear for the first time in Australia, with a peak audience attendance that year of 33,000.

In 1995 Stage 4 was added, as well as The Virtual Artists' internet tent, an at-the-time futuristic component of the program with a Netscape web browser. CUCME video conferencing software was also launched during the week of the festival, and The Discovery Channel made a documentary on WOMADelaide's 10-megabyte connection. A one-off CD compilation of artists, Womadelaide '95, was also released. The 1995 audience attendance was 55,000.

From 1996 the management and production of WOMADelaide was taken on by the Adelaide-based company Arts Projects Australia. This saw the special-event, one-off WOMAD Indian Pacific train trip from Perth to Pimba across the Nullarbor Plain on a chartered Indian Pacific train. It featured performances on board the carriages and culminated in a finale concert at Spud's Roadhouse at Pimba, 480 kilometres (300 mi) north of Adelaide, with the following lineup:

- Archie Roach and Ruby Hunter with Dave Steel (Australia)
- Francis Bebey (Cameroon)
- Mara! (Australia)
- Paul Kelly (Australia)
- Purna Das Baul and the Bauls of Bengal (India)
- Remmy Ongala (Tanzania)
- Shu-De (Tuva) and The Well Oiled Sisters (Scotland)

In 1997 the peak audience attendance across the weekend was 60,000, and a sibling event – WOMAD Pacific in Auckland, New Zealand – was held the weekend after WOMADelaide.

In 1998 another one-off event called WOMAD in the Vales, was held at McLaren Vale Oval on 15 March 1998 to celebrate the end of Robyn Archer's 1998 Adelaide Festival of Arts, with the following lineup:

- The Barkers (Australia)
- Geoffrey Oryema (Uganda)
- My Friend the Chocolate Cake (Australia)
- Pa Jobarteh (Gambia)
- The Sabri Brothers (Pakistan)
- Shooglenifty (Scotland)
- Southern Pipes and Drums (Australia)
- Tiddas (Australia)
- Yulduz Usmanova (Uzbekistan)

In 1999 the Workshop Stage became Stage 5, KidZone ran off-site school-based workshops, and the WoZone nightclub was established at the nearby Adelaide University bar, opening on Friday and Saturday from midnight till 5 am during the curfew at Botanic Park. WoZone had three rooms hosting live acts, DJs, and a chilling out space with projections and ambient music. Rather than being a one-off as in 1995, CD compilations of festival highlights for the Australian and New Zealand events became yearly this year.

=== 2000s ===
In 2001 Stage 5 changed locations, Papa Wemba replaced late cancellation Femi Kuti, and 18 volunteers operated the first information booth to celebrate the United Nations International Year of Volunteers.

In 2002 a small-scale event called The WOMAD Warm-Up saw three concerts and three workshops held in September at the Adelaide Festival Centre, with the following lineup:

- Chartwell Dutiro (Zimbabwe)
- Sally Nyolo (Cameroon)
- Trio Mocotó (Brazil)
- Ruby Hunter (Australia)
- Seckou Keita (Senegal)
- Mara and Llew Kiek (Australia)
- Ben Baddoo (Ghana)

In 2003, following a decision by the Rann government to financially support the event until at least 2009, WOMADelaide became an annual festival, with WOMADelaide Foundation Limited established as a not-for-profit organisation. The Foundation presented subsequent festivals and special projects for remote Indigenous arts communities, with the WOMADelaide moved to February and March to avoid the summer heat. 2003 also saw the introduction of the remedial therapy and relaxation area called Sanctuary – later renamed Healing Village – and the sibling WOMAD Pacific became the annual WOMAD New Zealand and moved to its permanent setting in Brooklands Park, New Plymouth in Taranaki.

In 2004 Taste The World was introduced, an innovation that was adopted by subsequent New Zealand and UK festivals, and the WOMADelaide Parade began this year.

In 2005 Stage 4 was renamed Zoo Stage, Stage 5 was renamed Moreton Stage and Stage 6 was renamed Dell. The festival was officially carbon neutral for the first time, and on-site ATMs were introduced.

In 2006 Speakers Corner and the Parachilna Garden Cafe were introduced, and Talvin Singh had the honour of being the first DJ in Botanic Park when he played on Stage 3.

In 2007 a cinema and pharmacy were added, DJs closed the festival each night in Speakers Corner, and workshops for visual arts were held at the Park Arts and Functions Complex.

In 2008 a one-off Eco Village joined the site.

In 2009 the first WOMADelaide Forest in South East Australia was planted in partnership with Greening Australia, KidZone had a stage, and track-matting pathways were added to combat both dry and wet conditions.

=== 2010s ===
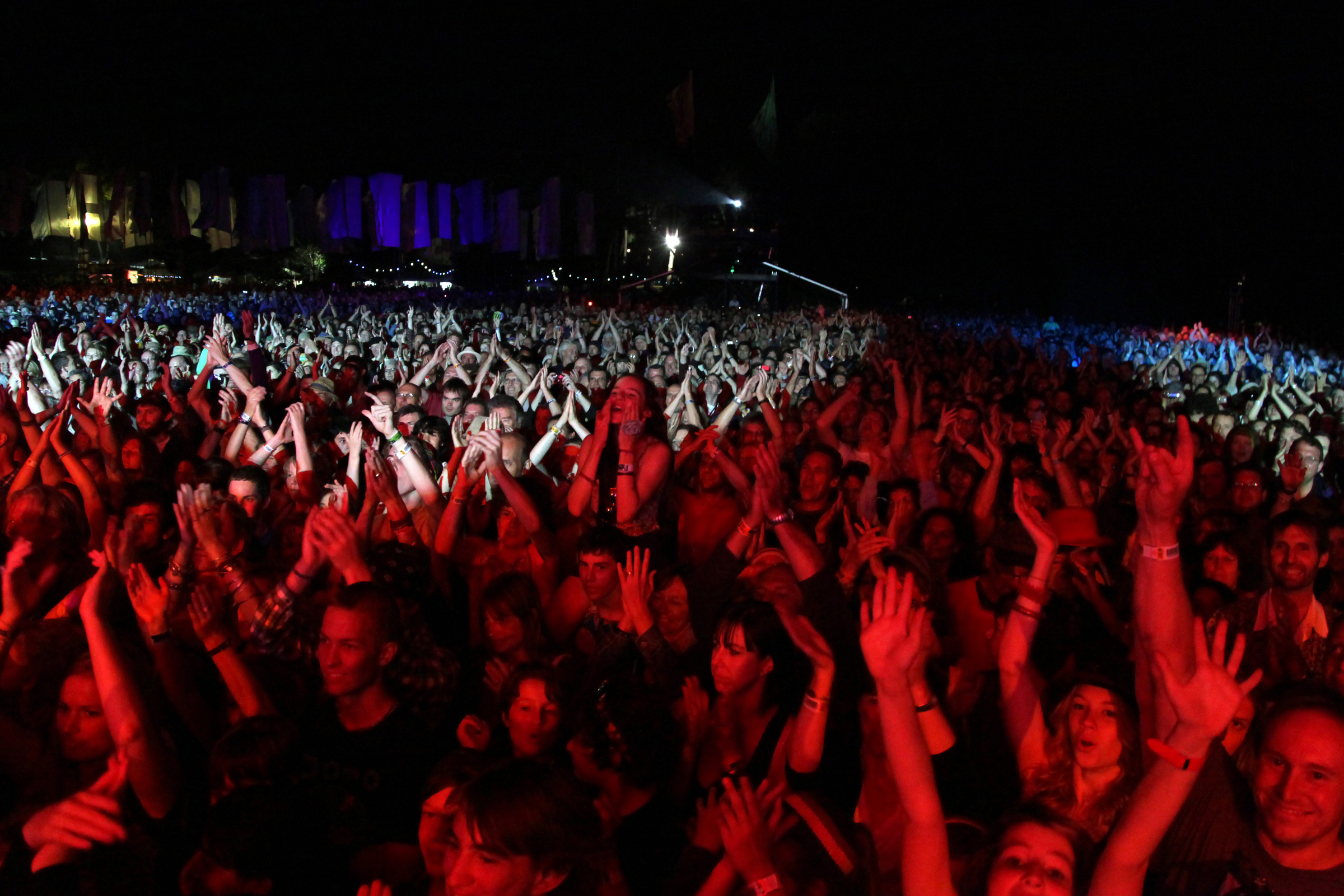
Crowd at WOMADelaide, 2011

In 2010 WOMADelaide extended to four days for the first time in celebration of the 50th anniversary of the Adelaide Festival of Arts, and due to overwhelming popularity the festival has continued at this length. That year WOMADelaide was produced and presented by the WOMADelaide Foundation, was managed by Arts Projects Australia and WOMAD Ltd, and was presented in association with the Government of South Australia.

In 2015 the South Australian Tourism Commission – an agency of the Government of South Australia – replaced the Government of South Australia as the event's principal partner.

In 2017 WOMADelaide became a smoke-free event, with provision for smoking in three designated areas. In addition to a festival highlights CD, a one-off DVD was also released.

=== 2020s ===
In 2020 the last annual festival highlights CD was released.

In 2021, in order to comply with COVID-19 restrictions, WOMADelaide was held in King Rodney Park / Ityamai-itpina instead of its usual location at Botanic Park. The format was changed to a series of seated concerts on a single stage, opening with Archie Roach and closing with Midnight Oil and First Nations collaborators on their Makarrata Live project. This was also the first year of WOMADelaide x NSS Academy, a collaboration with the youth music centre Northern Sound System, which was established to provide training and development program for emerging Aboriginal South Australians and multicultural artists. The program identified ten artists in its first year or operation, with musical duo MRLN x RKM selected to support Vika and Linda and Midnight Oil at WOMAD.

In 2022 the festival returned to Botanic Park for WOMADelaide's's 30th anniversary celebrations.

By 2023 the effects of the COVID-19 pandemic in Australia had waned and the event sold out its first three days for the first time, and was nearly sold out for its final day on the public holiday Monday.

In 2024 the Malinauskas Labour Government extended its longstanding partnership through to 2029.

In 2027 the festival celebrates 35 years with artists such as Leon Bridges, Underworld, and Madness joining the lineup featuring over 30 countries.

== Awards ==
=== National Live Music Awards ===
The National Live Music Awards commenced in 2016 and are a broad recognition of Australia's diverse live industry, celebrating the success of the Australian live scene.

Year	Nominee / work	Award	Result
National Live Music Awards of 2016	WOMADelaide	South Australian Live Event of the Year	Won
National Live Music Awards of 2020	WOMADelaide	Best Live Music Festival or Event	Nominated
National Live Music Awards of 2023	WOMADelaide	Best Live Event in SA	Won

=== South Australian Music Awards ===
The South Australian Music Awards – previously known as the Fowler's Live Music Awards – commenced in 2012 and are annual awards that recognise, promote, and celebrate excellence in the South Australian contemporary music industry.

Year	Nominee / work	Award	Result (wins only)
2012	WOMADelaide	Most Popular SA Live Music Event	Won
2013	WOMADelaide	Favourite SA Live Music Event	Won
2014	WOMADelaide	Favourite SA Live Music Event	Won
2015	WOMADelaide	Best Festival / Music Event	Won
2016	WOMADelaide	Best Festival / Music Event	Won

=== Other awards ===
In 2008 WOMADelaide won both the FasterLouder Festival Award for "Best Sound and Production", and the Helpmann Award for "Best Contemporary Music Festival". It also won a Helpmann Award in 2016.

== See also ==
- WOMADelaide line-ups
