= Kim Sanders (musician) =

- Born: 30 March 1948; Australia
- Died: 26 November 2013 (aged 65)
- Genres: World, Jazz, Folk

Kim Sanders was an Australian musician and composer. His album You Can't Get There From Here was nominated for 2002 ARIA Award for Best World Music Album.

Sanders was a member of multiple bands such as Tansey's Fancy (with Linsey Pollak, Mara Kiek, Llew Kiek and Doug Kelly), Nakisa (with Llew Kiek, Davood Tabrizi, Linda Marr, Tony Lewis and Sabahattin Akdagcik), GengGong (with Sawung Jabo), Trio Dingo (with Blair Greenberg and Ron Reeves) and Kim Sanders & Friends (With friends including Sandy Evans, Bobby Singh, James Greening, Sam Golding, Steve Elphick, Mark Szeto, Peter Kennard, Mustafa Karami, Ron Reeves, Toby Hall, Llew Kiek and Linda Marr).

== Discography ==
=== Albums ===
List of albums
Title	Album details
Bent Grooves	Released: 2007; Label: Kim Sanders; Format: CD
You Can't Get There From Here	Released: 2002; Label: Kim Sanders; Formats: CD
Trance 'N' Dance	Released: 2005; Label: Kim Sanders; Formats: CD
Brassov - Chronic Rhythmosis	Released 1997; Label: Rufus Records; repressed 2014; Format: CD

== Awards and nominations ==
=== ARIA Music Awards ===
The ARIA Music Awards is an annual awards ceremony that recognises excellence, innovation, and achievement across all genres of Australian music. They commenced in 1987.

Year	Nominee / work	Award	Result	Ref.
2002	You Can't Get There From Here	Best World Music Album	Nominated	
