= Timothy Cain =

Timothy Cain or Tim Cain may refer to:

- Tim Cain (born 1965), American video game developer
- Timothy M. Cain (born 1961), American judge
- Major Timothy Cain, a fictional character in the 2004 film Resident Evil: Apocalypse
- Tim Cain, a member of the American rock band Sons of Champlin

== See also ==
- Timothy Kain and Virginia Taylor, an Australian music duo
- Tim Kaine (born 1958), American attorney and politician
- Tim Kane (born 1968), American economist
