= J Boy (singer) =

Australian singer

- Birth name: Jason Connelly
- Born: Mount Isa, Queensland, Australia
- Genres: R&B
- Occupation(s): Singer, songwriter
- Instrument: Vocals
- Labels: Kalakuta Records

J Boy is a singer and songwriter from Mount Isa, Australia. He is a former member of Native Ryme Syndicate and released his solo debut CD in 2002. J Boy won a Deadly in 2001 for Most Promising New Talent .

== Discography ==
- Waited ep (2002) - Kalakuta Records

== Guest appearances ==
List of non-single guest appearances, with other performing artists, showing year released and album name
Title	Year	Other artist(s)	Album
"Do It Big"	2012	Papa Duck	Real Recognize Real
