= Mélodie Française =

Compilation album
- Released: 16 August 2013
- Recorded: 2012–2013
- Genres: Alternative rock, French pop music
- Language: French
- Labels: Inertia, Original Matters

Singles from Mélodie Française
- 1. "La Minute de Silence" Released: April 2013; 2. "Bonnie & Clyde"

Mélodie Française is a compilation album of iconic French pop songs covered by Australian musicians. It was officially released in Australia by independent record label Inertia and Original Matters on 16 August 2013.

Upon its release, Mélodie Française received positive reviews and support from leading Australian music media outlets: Rolling Stone Australia, The Music Network, Music Feeds, Tone Deaf, The AU Review, and Russh.

An album review by Greg Moskovitch of Music Feeds states: "Mélodie Française will course through you like a gliding plume of Gauloises smoke, so bring out your inner Francophile and order this sublime compilation of Aussie artists paying tribute to the language of love through iTunes now."

In a special feature, Australian Harper’s Bazaar said, “Francophiles rejoice. Last week, Mélodie Française - the highly anticipated Australian compilation of French covers - landed in our laps and it’s safe to say we’re hooked".

On 2 October 2013, Mélodie Française was nominated for Best World Music Album under the ARIA Music Awards Fine Arts category.

== Singles ==
The album's official lead single was "La Minute de Silence". Reinterpreted by Gossling and Oh Mercy's Alexander Gow, the single received support on Triple J, being premiered by music director Richard Kingsmill in March 2013.

"Bonnie & Clyde", a collaboration between Deep Sea Arcade and Megan Washington, was the second single released from the album, and the last song to be recorded for the compilation.

== Videos ==
For the music video of "La Minute de Silence", Gossling and Alexander Gow travelled to Paris. They were granted unprecedented access to film at the Moulin Rouge. Of the music clip, Pages Digital said, "It’s tender, romantic and very beautifully shot.”

== Awards ==
Year	Award-giving body	Award	Result
2013	ARIA Music Awards	Best World Music Album	Nominated

== Track listing ==
No.	Title	Lyrics	Music	Artist	Length
1.	"La minute de silence" (originally by Michel Berger)	Berger	Berger	Gossling & Oh Mercy	3:48
2.	"Morgane de toi" (originally by Renaud)	Renaud Séchan	Franck Langolff	The Jezabels	4:59
3.	"La vie en rose" (originally by Édith Piaf)	Piaf	Louiguy	Thelma Plum	2:43
4.	"Sexy Boy" (originally by Air)	Air	Air	Dappled Cities	4:24
5.	"Il n'y a pas d'amour heureux" (originally by Georges Brassens)	Louis Aragon	Brassens	Kate Miller-Heidke	3:56
6.	"Le berger"			Husky	4:21
7.	"Bonnie and Clyde" (originally by Serge Gainsbourg and Brigitte Bardot)	Gainsbourg	Gainsbourg	Deep Sea Arcade (feat. Megan Washington)	4:59
8.	"Bang Bang" (originally by Cher, first recorded in French by Sheila)	Claude Carrère; Georges Aber	Sonny Bono	Lisa Mitchell	3:18
9.	"Je t'aime... moi non plus" (originally by Serge Gainsbourg and Jane Birkin)	Gainsbourg	Gainsbourg	Big Scary	5:02
10.	"Le temps de l'amour" (originally by Les Fantômes as "Fort Chabrol"; first vocal recording by Françoise Hardy)	André Salvet; Lucien Morisse	Jacques Dutronc; Thomas Davidson Noton	Jinja Safari (feat. Okenyo)	2:24
11.	"Les feuilles mortes"	Jacques Prévert	Joseph Kosma	Katie Noonan	5:31
12.	"Belles! belles! belles!" (originally by the Everly Brothers as "Made to Love"; first recorded in French by Claude François)	Vline Buggy; François	Phil Everly	Edward Deer	3:20
13.	"Mini, mini, mini" (originally by Jacques Dutronc)	Jacques Lanzmann	Dutronc	The Walking Who (feat. Soko)	3:39
14.	"La mer" (originally by Charles Trenet)	Trenet	Trenet	Vance Joy	4:49
