= Corroboration (album) =

Compilation album by Various Artists
- Released: 2001
- Genres: Rock; hip hop; country; electronic; operatic
- Label: Sputnik/Festival Mushroom

Corroboration, or Corroboration: A Journey Through the Musical Landscape of 21st Century Australia, is a 2001 compilation album by various Australian artists which was released on the Festival Mushroom Records imprint, Sputnik. It was the result of a project put together by Kurt Luthy. It brought together Indigenous and non-Indigenous musicians and bands from various genres, with the majority of the songs especially written for the compilation. It reached No. 92 on ARIA Top 100 Albums chart.

== Accolades ==
Noel Mengel wrote in The Courier Mail that "it succeeds not just in the way it crosses genres and cultures but because of the quality of the music that results." The Australian's Sandra Bridekirk gave it four stars, calling it "the most unconventional snapshot of Australian music you could get – miles further down the track than predictable Oz rock samplers". Peter Lalor of The Daily Telegraph also gave it four stars, calling it "one of the more interesting "project" albums to have come from these shores." In Michael Duffy's four-star review in The Advertiser he states "this album is pleasing to the ear and an important step forward in the reconciliation process". The Sunday Mail called it "a work of art", saying it "mixes culture with music, heart with soul, black with white, sweet with sour".

In 2002 it received an ARIA Award nomination for Best World Music Album.

== TV and video ==
On 12 October 2001 SBS Television broadcast an episode of ICAM, "Corroboration", which detailed "the coming together of Indigenous and non-Indigenous musicians to record the new Festival Mushroom Records Corroboration CD". The episode was also issued as a music video of the same name, produced by Karla Grant and Darren Dale.

== Track listing ==
1. Deborah Cheetham and Wicked Beat Sound System – Dali Mana Gamarada (D. Cheetham, D. Robertson)
2. Kylie Minogue and Jimmy Little – Bury Me Deep in Love (David McComb)
3. Jodi Cockatoo Creed and george – Hallelujah Sister (Katie Noonan, Nicholas Stewart, Martin Challis)
4. The Cruel Sea and Native Ryme feat. Kev Carmody – Together (The Cruel Sea, Native Ryme, Kev Carmody)
5. Augie March and Archie Roach & Ruby Hunter – Minister For Planets (G. Richards)
6. Little G and Pound System – Who Cares? (Pound System, G Christanthopolous)
7. Primary and NoKTuRNL – One By One (J. Fonti, C. Mitchell, S. Fonti, NoKTuRNL)
8. Frank Yamma and David Bridie – Coolibah (Frank Yamma)
9. Pnau and Stiff Gins – Ride (Pnau and Stiff Gins)
10. Billie Court and Friendly – In The Middle (Andrew Kornweibel)
11. Magic Dirt and Richard Frankland – Who Made Me Who I Am (Richard Frankland)

Another track, "Back in the Shadows" by You Am I and Vic Simms, was left off the album. It was withdrawn by Simms in protest against what he saw as bias in the albums promotion.
