= Baby et Lulu =

Australian chanteuse duo

- Genre: Chanteuse
- Label: Vitamin Records

Baby et Lulu is an Australian chanteuse duo of Abby Dobson ("Baby") and Lara Goodridge ("Lulu"). Their album Album Deux was nominated for 2015 ARIA Award for Best World Music Album.

== Members ==
- Abby Dobson
- Lara Goodridge

== Discography ==
=== Albums ===
Title	Details	Peak positions
Title	Details	AUS
Baby et Lulu	Released: 2012; Label: Baby et Lulu (BN01); Formats: CD, digital	—
Album Deux	Released: 2015; Label: Baby et Lulu (BN02); Formats: CD, digital	—
Album Trois	Released: 3 September 2021; Label: Baby et Lulu (BN02); Formats: CD, digital	—

== Awards and nominations ==
=== AIR Awards ===
The Australian Independent Record Awards (commonly known informally as AIR Awards) is an annual awards night to recognise, promote and celebrate the success of Australia's Independent Music sector.

Year	Nominee / work	Award	Result	Ref.
2022	Album Trois	Best Independent Jazz Album or EP	Nominated	

=== ARIA Music Awards ===
The ARIA Music Awards is an annual awards ceremony that recognises excellence, innovation, and achievement across all genres of Australian music. They commenced in 1987.

Year	Nominee / work	Award	Result	Ref.
2015	Album Deux	Best World Music Album	Nominated	
