= Voices from the Vacant Lot =

Vallinto

Voices from the Vacant Lot is an Australian choir from the South Sydney area. Their album Dance on Your Bones was nominated for the 1999 ARIA Award for Best World Music Album.

The group performs songs from many different countries, in various languages.

== Discography ==
=== Albums ===
Title	Details	Peak positions
Title	Details	AUS
Dance on Your Bones	Released: December 1998; Label: Voices from the Vacant Lot (VVL01); Formats: CD	—

== Awards and nominations ==
=== ARIA Music Awards ===
The ARIA Music Awards is an annual awards ceremony held by the Australian Recording Industry Association. They commenced in 1987.

Year	Nominee / work	Award	Result	Ref.
1999	Dance on Your Bones	Best World Music Album	Nominated	
