= Sirocco (band) =

- Origin: Australia
- Genres: Folk
- Years active: 1980–present
- Labels: Australian Broadcasting Corporation
- Past members: Bill O'Toole; Andrew de Teliga; Guy Madigan; Michael Atherton; Paul Koerbin; Peter Carolan; Peter Jacob; Paul Jarman; Martin Tucker; Doug Kelly; Chai Chang Ning; Robert Bester; David Hudson; Hugh Moran; Sabahattin Akdağcık; Andrew Tredinnick; Gang Xue; Jonathan Xue; Mark Cain
- Website: www.siroccoz.com

Sirocco is an Australian music group that began in 1980 with three musicians: Bill O'Toole, Guy Madigan and Andrew de Teliga. In 1981 Michael Atherton joined and the group recorded their first album Paths of the Wind.

They have been nominated for the ARIA Award for Best Indigenous Release in 1987 (Voyage), for Best Independent Release in 1990 (Port of Call) and for Best World Music Album three times, 1995 (The Wetland Suite), 1996 (Stars and Fires) and 1999 (Falling Leaf).

The concept of the band was to find inspiration from the numerous cultures in Australia. When Sirocco started, the music scene in Australia was classical, rock, jazz and a little folk. However, the numerous migrant cultures, such as Chilean, Turkish, Arabic and Irish, had a vibrant music culture. Sirocco tapped into this and brought many of these expert musicians into the band for guest performances.

The early albums and performances were known for the unusual array of instruments rarely seen outside their community, including the oud, cittern, cabrette, kaval, doumbek, and tupan. Their instruments were mixed and matched in the same way as the Australian population. Their performances were wild, always getting the audience up and dancing—"the excitement of rock and roll, the improvisation of jazz and the musicianship of classical". Of interest, they performed at many weddings because there are many intercultural marriages in Australia. The bride and groom came from very different cultures and it was only Sirocco who could perform their music in such an Australian manner.

They are well known for innovation and it was demonstrated in their concert in the endangered Macquarie Marshes in 1993 and the concert with the Dayaks in central Borneo.

Sirocco now have 14 albums released and a video. They have toured over 32 countries including India (four times), Laos, Nepal and Pakistan, and were the first Australian group to tour both Russia and China.

== Discography ==
=== Albums ===
Title	Details	Peak positions
Title	Details	AUS
Paths of the Wind	Released: 1982; Label: Arika Records (AR004); Formats: LP	—
Earth Dance	Released: 1983; Label: Arika Records (AR004); Formats: LP	—
Voyage	Released: 1986; Label: Larrikin Records (LRF 184); Formats: LP, Cassette	—
Port of Call	Released: 1989; Label: Jarra Hill Records (JHR 2009); Formats: CD, LP, Cassette	—
The Breath of Time	Released: 1990; Label: ABC Records (842738-2); Formats: CD, LP	—
A Celtic Breeze in the Antipodes	Released: 1992; Label: Jarra Hill (CDJHR 2018); Formats: CD; Compilation of Path of the Wind and Earth Dance	—
The Evergreen Realm (with Chai Chang Ning)	Released: 1992; Label: Jarra Hill Records (CDJHR2015); Formats: CD	—
Australian Voyage - Folk-Rock Symphony	Released: 1992; Label: Arc Music; Formats: CD	—
Wetland Suite	Released: 1993; Label: ABC Music (4795892); Formats: CD	—
Stars & Fires	Released: 1995; Label: ABC Music (4798372); Formats: CD	—
Walkabout the World	Released: 1996; Label: Musica Pangaea (MP 10001); Formats: CD	—
Zephyr	Released: 1996; Label: ABC Music, EMI (72438544582 8); Formats: CD	—
Falling Leaf	Released: 1998; Label: ABC Music, EMI (72434945182 7); Formats: CD	—
Essential Elements - A Collection	Released: 2003; Label: ABC Music (13162); Formats: CD; Note: Compilation	—

=== Film/television composer or contributor ===
- Charlie's Angels "Belly" original song (2000)
- Perfume feature film score, directed by Michael Rymer (2001)
- Undertow Didgeridoo for feature film score by Philip Glass (2004)
- Revolution TV film score, directed by Michael Rymer (2009)

== Awards and nominations ==
=== ARIA Music Awards ===
The ARIA Music Awards is an annual awards ceremony that recognises excellence, innovation, and achievement across all genres of Australian music. They commenced in 1987.

Year	Nominee / work	Award	Result	Ref.
1987	Voyage	Best World Music Album	Nominated	
1990	Port of Call	Best Independent Release	Nominated	
1995	The Wetland Suite	Best World Music Album	Nominated	
1996	Stars and Fires	Best World Music Album	Nominated	
1999	Falling Leaf	Best World Music Album	Nominated	
