= Mohamed Bangoura (musician) =

Guinean drummer based in Sydney

- Born: Bourramya-Koubya, Guinea
- Genres: World Music

Mohamed Bangoura, is a Guinean drummer based in Sydney. His album Djembe Kan was nominated for the 2004 ARIA Award for Best World Music Album.

== Discography ==
=== Albums ===
Title	Details
Percussions De Guinee & Chants Baga	Released: 1999; Label: Buda Records (1977802); Formats: CD
Djembe Kan	Released: 2004; Label: Mara Music; Formats: CD
Mandeng Jeli	Released: 2006; Label: Mohamed Bangoura; Formats: CD
Hamanah Doundounba	Released: 2007; Label: Mohamed Bangoura; Formats: CD

== Awards and nominations ==
=== ARIA Music Awards ===
The ARIA Music Awards is an annual awards ceremony that recognises excellence, innovation, and achievement across all genres of Australian music. They commenced in 1987.

Year	Nominee / work	Award	Result	Ref.
2004	Djembe Kan	Best World Music Album	Nominated	
