= Live in Europe (Mara! album) =

Live album by Mara!
- Released: April 2001
- Label: Mara! Music

Mara! chronology
Sezoni (1997)	Live in Europe (2001)	Sorella (2005)

Live in Europe is a live album by Australian world music quintet Mara!. The album was released in April 2001.

At the ARIA Music Awards of 2001, the album won the ARIA Award for Best World Music Album.

== Track listing ==
1. "Na Dolu"
2. "Glastonbury Lullaby"
3. "All Summer"
4. "Eyes Like Berries"
5. "Ovdovyala Lissichkata"
6. "Alessandria"
7. "Nesine Taksim"
8. "Nesine"
9. "The Big Pack"
10. "Tu Madre Quando Te Pario"
11. "Fair Kop"
12. "The Big Dance"
