= James Muller =

- Origin: Australia
- Genre: Jazz
- Occupation: Guitarist

James Muller is an Australian jazz guitarist. The James Muller Trio won the 2000 ARIA Award for Best Jazz Album with the album All Out. Muller was nominated for same award in 2002 with Thrum and in 2006 with Kaboom.

== Discography ==
=== Albums ===
Title	Details
No You Don't	Released: 1995; Label: Round Records
All Out	Released: 1999; Label: ABC Jazz
Thrum	Released: 2002; Label: ABC Jazz
Kaboom	Released: 2006; Label: Birdland (BL 007)
Live At Wangaratta 07 (with Sean Wayland, Matt Penman and Jochen Rueckert)	Released: 2007; Label: Seed Music Records (SEED CD 13)
Neurotica	Released: 2015; Label: Cluster-J Records (CLU15001)
Live At Wizard Tone (with Will Vinson, Sam Anning and Ben Vanderwal)	Released: 2018; Label: 54 Records (CD5405)

== Awards ==
=== ARIA Music Awards ===
The ARIA Music Awards is an annual awards ceremony that recognises excellence, innovation, and achievement across all genres of the music of Australia.

Year	Nominee / work	Award	Result	Ref.
2000	All Out (as James Muller Trio)	Best Jazz Album	Won	
2002	Thrum	Best Jazz Album	Nominated	
2006	Kaboom	Best Jazz Album	Nominated	

=== Freedman Jazz Fellowship ===
This award is offered each year to young Australian musicians to enable them to execute a particular project.

Year	Result	Ref.
2004	Won	

=== Mo Awards ===
The Australian Entertainment Mo Awards (commonly known informally as the Mo Awards), were annual Australian entertainment industry awards. They recognise achievements in live entertainment in Australia from 1975 to 2016. James Muller won two awards in that time.

Year	Nominee / work	Award	Result (wins only)
2000	James Muller	Jazz Instrumental Performer of the Year	Won
2000	James Muller Trio	Jazz Group of the Year	Won
