= 2002 ARIA Music Awards =

Annual Australian music awards ceremony

- Date: 15 October 2002
- Venue: Sydney Superdome, Sydney, New South Wales

Highlights
- Most wins: Kylie Minogue (5); Silverchair (5)
- Most nominations: Kasey Chambers (7); Alex Lloyd (7); Kylie Minogue (7); Silverchair (7)
- Website: ariaawards.com.au

Television/radio coverage
- Network: Network Ten

The 16th Annual Australian Recording Industry Association Music Awards (generally known as the ARIA Music Awards or simply the ARIAs) were held on 15 October 2002 at the Sydney SuperDome.

== Awards ==
=== ARIA Awards ===
Winners highlighted in bold with nominations below them in plain.

- Album of the Year
  - **Kasey Chambers – Barricades & Brickwalls**
    - Alex Lloyd – Watching Angels Mend
    - george – Polyserena
    - Kylie Minogue – Fever
    - Silverchair – Diorama
- Single of the Year
  - **Kylie Minogue – "Can't Get You Out of My Head"**
    - Alex Lloyd – "Amazing"
    - Grinspoon – "Chemical Heart"
    - Kasey Chambers – "Not Pretty Enough"
    - The Vines – "Get Free"
- Highest Selling Album
  - **Kylie Minogue – Fever**
    - Alex Lloyd – Watching Angels Mend
    - Kasey Chambers – Barricades & Brickwalls
    - Nikki Webster – Follow Your Heart
    - The 12th Man – The Final Dig?
- Highest Selling Single
  - **Kylie Minogue – "Can't Get You Out of My Head"**
    - Alex Lloyd – "Amazing"
    - Holly Valance – "Kiss Kiss"
    - Kasey Chambers – "Not Pretty Enough"
    - Shakaya – "Stop Calling Me"
- Best Group
  - **Silverchair – Diorama**
    - george – Polyserena
    - Grinspoon – New Detention
    - Powderfinger – "The Metre/Waiting for the Sun"
    - The Vines – Highly Evolved
- Best Female Artist
  - **Kasey Chambers – Barricades & Brickwalls**
    - Holly Valance – "Kiss Kiss"
    - Kylie Minogue – Fever
    - Lisa Miller – Car Tape
    - Natalie Imbruglia – White Lilies Island
- Best Male Artist
  - **Alex Lloyd – Watching Angels Mend**
    - Dan Brodie – Empty Arms Broken Hearts
    - Darren Hayes – Spin
    - Paul Kelly – Nothing But a Dream
    - Paul Mac – 3000 Feet High
- Breakthrough Artist – Album
  - **george – Polyserena**
    - 1200 Techniques – Choose One
    - Dan Brodie & The Broken Arrows – Empty Arms Broken Hearts
    - Eskimo Joe – Girl
    - The Vines – Highly Evolved
- Breakthrough Artist – Single
  - **The Vines – "Get Free"**
    - 1200 Techniques – "Karma (What Goes Around)"
    - Holly Valance – "Kiss Kiss"
    - Machine Gun Fellatio – "Girl of My Dreams (Is Giving Me Nightmares)"
    - The Waifs – "London Still"
- Best Pop Release
  - **Kylie Minogue – Fever**
    - Disco Montego – "Beautiful"
    - george – Polyserena
    - Holly Valance – "Kiss Kiss"
    - The Whitlams – Torch the Moon
- Best Dance Release
  - **Paul Mac – 3000 Feet High**
    - 1200 Techniques – "Karma (What Goes Around)"
    - Gerling – "Dust Me Selecta"
    - Katalyst – Manipulating Agent
    - [Love] Tattoo – [Love] Tattoo
- Best Rock Album
  - **Silverchair – Diorama**
    - Alex Lloyd – Watching Angels Mend
    - Grinspoon – New Detention
    - Motor Ace – Shoot This
    - The Vines – Highly Evolved
- Best Country Album
  - **Kasey Chambers – Barricades & Brickwalls**
    - Adam Harvey – Workin' Overtime
    - Catherine Britt – Dusty Smiles and Heartbreak Cures
    - Lee Kernaghan – Electric Rodeo
    - Troy Cassar-Daley – Long Way Home
- Best Independent Release
  - **1200 Techniques – Karma (What Goes Around)**
    - Icecream Hands – "Rain Hail Shine"
    - Killing Heidi – Heavensent
    - Lisa Miller – Car Tape
    - The Waifs – "London Still"
- Best Adult Contemporary Album
  - **Paul Kelly – Nothing But a Dream**
    - Archie Roach – Sensual Being
    - Jimmy Little – Resonate
    - Lisa Miller – Car Tape
    - Vika and Linda – Love is Mighty Close
- Best Blues & Roots Album
  - **Jeff Lang & Bob Brozman – Rolling Through This World**
    - Backsliders – Hanoi
    - Bondi Cigars – Down in the Valley
    - Dave Steel – Home Is a Hard Thing to Find
    - Mick Hart – Upside Down in the Full Face of Optimism
- Best Children's Album
  - **Hi-5 – Boom Boom Beat**
    - The Hooley Dooleys – Roll Up! Roll Up!
    - The Star Girls – The Star Girls from Planet Groove
    - Tasmanian Symphony Orchestra, Sean O'Boyle – Symphony of Lullabies
    - The Wiggles – Wiggly Safari
- Best Comedy Release
  - **The 12th Man – The Final Dig?**
    - The Drugs – The Bold and The Beautiful
    - Kevin Bloody Wilson – The Second Kumin' of Kev
    - "Slamming" Sam Kekovich – You Know It Makes Sense
    - The Umbilical Brothers – "Don't Dance to This"

=== Fine Arts Awards ===
- Best Jazz Album
  - **Andrea Keller – Thirteen Sketches**
    - Dale Barlow – Dale Barlow Live
    - James Morrison – Scream Machine
    - James Muller – Thrum
    - The Umbrellas – Bravo Nino Rota
- Best Classical Album
  - **Slava Grigoryan – Sonatas & Fantasies**
    - David Hobson – Handel: Arias
    - Genevieve Lacey, Linda Kent – Piracy
    - Geoffrey Lancaster – Haydn: Keyboard Sonatas Volume 1
    - Yvonne Kenny, Adelaide Symphony Orchestra – Gorecki: Symphony No. 3
- Best Original Cast / Show Production Recording
  - **Various – The Man from Snowy River: Arena Spectacular**
    - Judi Connelli – Back to Before
    - Opera Australia, Simone Young – Verdi: Requiem
    - Original Australian Cast Recording – The Wizard of Oz
    - Play Act One – Story of Abbey
- Best Original Soundtrack Production Recording
  - **Paul Kelly, Shane O' Mara, Steve Hadley, Bruce Haymes, Peter Luscombe – Lantana**
    - Graham Tardif & Rolf de Heer (composers), Archie Roach (performer) – The Tracker
    - David Thrussell – The Hard Word
    - Mario Millo – Changi
    - Various – Dirty Deeds
- Best World Music Album
  - **Monsieur Camembert – Live on Stage**
    - Coda – There Is a Way to Fly
    - Kim Sanders – You Can't Get There From Here
    - Nabarlek – Bininj Manborlh / Blackfella Road
    - Various – Corroboration

=== Artisan Awards ===
- Producer of the Year
  - **Daniel Johns – Silverchair – Diorama**
    - Alex Lloyd, Magnus Fiennes – Alex Lloyd – Watching Angels Mend
    - Daniel Denholm – The Whitlams – Torch the Moon
    - David Nicholas, george – george – Polyserena
    - Gerling, Magoo – Gerling – When Young Terrorists Chase the Sun
    - Phil McKellar – Grinspoon – New Detention
    - Richard Pleasance & Paul Kelly – Archie Roach – Sensual Being
- Engineer of the Year
  - **Anton Hagop – Silverchair – Diorama**
    - Adam Rhodes & DW Norton – Superheist – "A Dignified Rage"
    - Daniel Denholm – The Whitlams – Torch the Moon
    - Paul Mac – Paul Mac – 3000 Feet High
    - Phil McKellar – Grinspoon – Chemical Heart
- Best Video
  - **Michael Gracey, Babyfoot Productions – 1200 Techniques – "Karma (What Goes Around)"**
    - Jolyon Watkins – Gerling – "Dust Me Selecta"
    - Michael Spiccia, Prodigy Films – Disco Montego – "Beautiful"
    - Nash Edgerton – Eskimo Joe – "Liar"
    - Square-Eyed Films – Silverchair – "The Greatest View"
- Best Cover Art
  - **Darren Glindemann, John Watson, Melissa Chenery, Daniel Johns – Silverchair – Diorama**
    - Art of the State, Scott James Smith – The Whitlams – Torch the Moon
    - Campbell Murray Creating – Kasey Chambers – Barricades & Brickwalls
    - Chris Von Sanden – george – Polyserena
    - Craig Nicholls – The Vines – Highly Evolved

== Outstanding Achievement Award ==
- Kylie Minogue

== ARIA Hall of Fame inductee ==
Inducted into the ARIA Hall of Fame was:

- Olivia Newton-John

== See also ==
- Music of Australia
