= Tribal Heart =

Compilation album
- Released: 1994
- Label: AIM

Tribal Heart is a compilation album of music from the South Pacific. It was coordinated by Denis Gonzalez and released in Australia by AIM Records in 1994. It was nominated for a 1995 ARIA Award for Best World Music Album.

== Accolades ==
Year	Award	Nomination	Result
1995	ARIA Music Awards	Best World Music Album	Nominated

== Track listing ==
1. Buffalo Stampede - Blek Bala Mujik
2. Tahi (Kia Kotahi Ra) - Moana and the Moahunters
3. Saturday Night - Fontom From
4. Keep an Open Heart - Willie Hona
5. Black Australia - I Land
6. Congo Bongo - Joe T (i.e. Richmond Acheampong)
7. Uyu Teo - Larry Maluma and Kalimba
8. Mununutapa - Valanga Khoza and Saffika
9. French Letter - Herbs
10. My Mother, My Land - Ron Jemmott and Un Tabu
11. Somalia - Shango
12. I Man Never Die - Denis Gonzalez
13. Just Another Weekend - Dee Cee Lewis and The Crew
14. Rowena - Barike
15. Musiki Manjaro - Musiki Manjaro
16. Mawo Ma - Kakalika
