= Paul Jarman =

Australian musician

Paul Jarman is an Australian multi-instrumentalist, composer and choirmaster. He is known for his work with school children, assisting them to develop their compositions.

Jarman works with other composers and choir leaders. and promotes the inclusion of traditional music forms in compositions. His compositions for choir and orchestra have been performed around the world in venues such as the White House and at the opening of the World Rugby and at the London Olympics.

From 1996 Paul Jarman has been part of the Australian world music group, Sirocco. He produced their album 'Falling Leaf' as well as playing on all the tracks. He has performed for audiences in over 35 countries.

His instruments include the piano, saxophone, clarinet, bombard, tin whistle, synthesizer, taragoto, and bagpipe.

He lives in northern New South Wales.

== Albums ==
- Birralee Blokes – Towards Infinity (ABC Classics)
- Gondwana Voices – New Light New Hope (ABC Classics)
- Sing NSW/Sirocco – Young Australian’s Voices of Achievement (ABC Classics)
- Sirocco – Falling Leaf (ABC Classics – nominated for Aria award 1999)
- Sirocco – Under the Southern Sky and Essential Elements
- The Voices of Vinegar Hill – (NSW ministries for the Arts)
- ABC Choir of the Year 2006 – Pemulwuy, Birralee Blokes (ABC Classics)
- Young Voices of Melbourne – Journeys
- Woden Valley Youth Choir – Ancient Cries (Songs from Australia)
- Voices of Birralee – A world Full of Colour

Jarman also played several penny whistle and taragoto solos on Fiona Joy Hawkins' album 600 Years in a Moment.
