= Love Tattoo (musician) =

[Love] Tattoo
- Birth name: Stephen Allkins
- Origin: Australia
- Genres: Dance music; EDM
- Occupation: Music producer
- Years active: 1999–2006
- Labels: Essential Recordings; Hussle Recordings; ABC Music

Stephen Allkins, known professionally as [Love] Tattoo is an Australian DJ and music producer. He is best known for his 2001 single "Bass Has Got Me Movin'".

== Career ==
In 1999, [Love] Tattoo released his debut single "History of Disco" on Essential Recordings. This was followed by the double A sided single "Drums"/"Bass" on Hussle Recordings.

In April 2001, [Love] Tattoo released "Bass Has Got Me Movin'", which peaked at number 56 on the ARIA Charts. At the ARIA Music Awards of 2001, "Bass Has Got Me Movin'", was nominated for the Best Dance Release. His debut album, [Love] Tattoo was released in 2001 and at the ARIA Music Awards of 2002, [Love] Tattoo was also nominated for Best Dance Release.

In April 2006, [Love] Tattoo released his second studio album, Body Work.

== Discography ==
=== Albums ===
Year	Album details
2001	[Love] Tattoo: Released: August 2001; Label: Hussle Recordings (HUSSYCD002); Format: CD
2006	Body Work: Released: April 2006; Label: ABC Music (5101105762); Format: CD

=== Singles ===
List of singles as lead artist, with selected chart positions and certifications
Year	Title	Peak chart positions	Album
Year	Title	AUS	Album
1999	"History of Disco"	—	non album singles
1999	"Drums" / "Bass"	—	non album singles
2000	"Drop Some Drums"	—	(Love) Tattoo
2001	"Bass Has Got Me Movin'"	56	(Love) Tattoo
2002	"Love's Theme (Party)"	—	(Love) Tattoo
2004	"Burnin' Up"	—	Body Work
2005	"Put Ya Body in It"	—	Body Work

== Awards and nominations ==
=== ARIA Music Awards ===
Year	Nominee / work	Award	Result
2001	"Bass Has Got Me Movin'"	Best Dance Release	Nominated
2002	[Love] Tattoo	Best Dance Release	Nominated
