= Tigramuna =

Tigramuna is an Australian band active since 1993 that combines Latin-American music with jazz. Their album Jazz Latino-Americano was nominated for ARIA Award for Best World Music Album.

== Members ==
- Carlos Villanueva
- Wendy Upjohn
- Fernando Arancibia
- Craig Driscoll
- Richard Ottmar
- Phillip South
- Andrew Robertson
- Mark Taylor
- Emile Nelson
- Jeff Camilleri
- Robbie Siracusa
- Alex Osorio
- Cesar Marin
- Steve Marin
- Paul Chenard
- Willow Neilson
- Nick Southcott
- Duano Martinez
- Evan Mannell
- Nicolas Villanueva
- Marcelo Villanueva
- Ednaldo Ignacio
- Claudio Hevia
- Marco Cavajal
- Hamish Mcleod

== Discography ==
=== Albums ===
Title	Details	Peak positions
Title	Details	AUS
Tigramuna	Released: 1997; Label: Tigramuna; Formats: CD	—
Jazz Latino - Americano	Released: May 1998; Label: Tigramuna (ANA-TIG-001); Formats: CD	—

== Awards and nominations ==
=== ARIA Music Awards ===
The ARIA Music Awards is an annual awards ceremony that recognises excellence, innovation, and achievement across all genres of Australian music. They commenced in 1987.

Year	Nominee / work	Award	Result	Ref.
1998	Jazz Latino - Americano	Best World Music Album	Nominated	
