= Womadelaide '95 =

Compilation album
- Released: 1996
- Genre: World music
- Label: ABC Records

Womadelaide '95 is a compilation album of music by artists from Womadelaide in 1995. The songs were recorded live by ABC Radio sound crews. Bruce Elder from the Sydney Morning Herald wrote that the album was "an extraordinary demonstration of how some of the greatest world music acts are reduced by studio technology, and how immensely better they sound when they perform live". The album was nominated the 1996 ARIA Award for Best World Music Album.

== Track listing ==
1. Didgeridoo Solo/Baru (Crocodile) - Sunrize Band
2. Les Mamas Des Mamas - Zap Mama
3. We've Started A Fire - Vika and Linda Bull
4. Uzelange - Hukwe Zawose
5. Modernise, Westernise - Rough Image
6. Static - Mouth Music
7. Sahara (Medley) - Jah Wobble's Invaders of the Heart
8. Boabab - Justin Vali Trio
9. Cachito Pa Huele - Sierra Maestra
10. Lapwony - Geoffrey Oryema
11. Loay Loay Aaja Mahi - Nusrat Fateh Ali Khan
12. Must Must - Nusrat Fateh Ali Khan
13. Ari Lo - Yungchen Lhamo
