= The Barons of Tang =

The Barons Of Tang
- Genre: World Music
- Years active: 2007 –

The Barons Of Tang is a Melbourne-based seven-piece band who mix together a large range of genres, most commonly world music. They term the resulting music "gypsy deathcore".

Their album Into the Mouths of Hungry Giants was nominated for the 2014 ARIA Award for Best World Music Album.

== Members ==
- Don Carlos Parraga – Accordion
- Julian Cue – Double bass, Vocals
- Sean Wyers – Drums
- Anders Pfeiffer – Percussion
- Aviva Endean – Bass Clarinet
- Anna Joy Gordon – Saxophone
- Jules Brunton – Electric Guitar

== Discography ==
=== Albums ===
Title	Details	Peak positions
Title	Details	AUS
Into the Mouths of Hungry Giants	Released: November 2013; Label: Birds Robe Records; Formats: CD, digital	—

== Awards and nominations ==
=== ARIA Music Awards ===
The ARIA Music Awards is an annual awards ceremony that recognises excellence, innovation, and achievement across all genres of Australian music. They commenced in 1987.

Year	Nominee / work	Award	Result	Ref.
2014	Into the Mouths of Hungry Giants	Best World Music Album	Nominated	
