= Chaika (band) =

Australian band

- Origin: Sydney, Australia
- Members: Susie Bishop; Laura Altman; Emily-Rose Sarkova; Laura Bishop; Johan Delin; Rendra Freestone

Chaika is an Australian band. Originally formed as Di Khupe Heybners they play a mix of styles including folk, jazz, chamber music and they sing in Italian, Russian, Bulgarian, Hebrew, Romanie and English.

Their third album, Arrow, was nominated for the 2019 ARIA Award for Best World Music Album.

== Members ==
- Susie Bishop (violin, guitar, vocals)
- Laura Altman (clarinet, vocals)
- Emily-Rose Sarkova (accordion, piano, vocals)
- Laura Bishop (percussion, piano, accordion, vocals)
- Johan Delin (double bass, vocals)
- Rendra Freestone (percussion, guitar, vocals)
- Phillippa Murphy-Haste (clarinet, vocals)
- Sarah Myerson (cimbalom, vocals)
- Mirabai Peart (violin)

== Discography ==
=== Albums ===
Title	Details	Peak positions
Title	Details	AUS
Songs of the Vulgar Boatwomen (as Di Khupe Heybners)	Released: June 2008; Label: Formats: CD	—
Chaika	Released: July 2012; Label: Chaika (Chaika 001); Formats: CD	—
I Monti	Released: 2014; Label: Chaika (Chaika 002); Formats: CD	—
Arrow'	Released: 2019; Label: Chaika (Chaika 003); Formats: CD, Digital	—

== Awards and nominations ==
=== ARIA Music Awards ===
The ARIA Music Awards is an annual awards ceremony that recognises excellence, innovation, and achievement across all genres of Australian music. They commenced in 1987.

Year	Nominee / work	Award	Result	Ref.
2019	Arrow	Best World Music Album	Nominated	
