= Eishan Ensemble =

Australian jazz ensemble

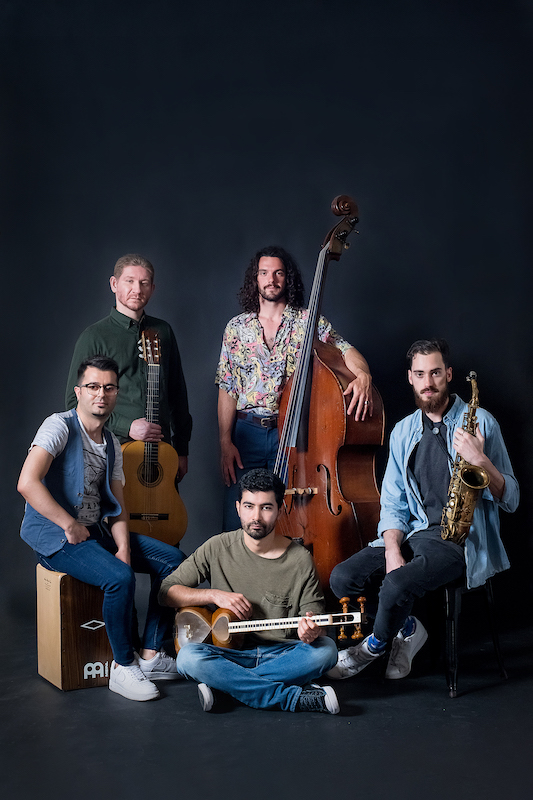

Background information
- Origin: Sydney, NSW, Australia
- Genres: world music; jazz; fusion
- Years active: 2016 – present
- Labels: Art As Catharsis Records; Earshift Music
- Members: Hamed Sadeghi; Michael Avgenicos; Pedram Layegh; Adem Yilmaz; Maximillian Alduca
- Website: www.EishanEnsemble.com

Eishan Ensemble are an Australian world/jazz band. Formed and led by the Persian-Australian composer and tar player Hamed Sadeghi, they are known for blending Persian classical music with jazz through original compositions by Sadeghi.

The core members of Eishan Ensemble are Michael Avgenicos on saxophone, Pedram Layegh on guitar, Adem Yilmaz on drums, Maximillian Alduca on double bass and Hamed Sadeghi on tar. The band has toured nationally and internationally since it was formed.

They released their debut album, Nim Dong in 2018; their second album, Afternoon Tea At Six, at Sydney Festival 2021; their third album, Project Masnavi, was also released in 2021 and was launched at the Sydney Opera House.

== Members ==
- Hamed Sadeghi (tar)
- Michael Avgenicos (alto and tenor saxophones, clarinet)
- Pedram Layegh (guitar)
- Adem Yilmaz (percussions)
- Maximillian Alduca (double bass)

=== Collaborators ===
- Sonya Holowell (vocal, on Afternoon Tea At Six)
- Adnan Barake (oud, on Afternoon Tea At Six)
- Marcello Maio (accordion, on Project Masnavi)
- Alex Inman-Hislop (drums, on Project Masnavi)
- Elsen Price (double bass, on Nim Dong and Afternoon Tea At Six)

== Discography ==
=== Albums ===
| Title | Details |
|---|---|
| Nim Dong | Released: 28 June 2018; Label: Art As Catharsis Records |
| Afternoon Tea at Six (featuring Hamed Sadeghi) | Released: 15 May 2020; Label: Art As Catharsis Records |
| Project Masnavi | Released: 7 May 2021; Label: Earshifts Music |
| Northern Rhapsody | Released: 9 May 2025; Label: ACEL |

== Awards and nominations ==
=== ARIA Music Awards ===
The ARIA Music Awards is an annual awards ceremony that recognises excellence, innovation, and achievement across all genres of Australian music. They commenced in 1987.

| Year | Nominee / work | Award | Result | Ref. |
|---|---|---|---|---|
| 2021 | Project Masnavi | Best World Music Album | Nominated | |
