= Tim Gibuma and the Storm =

- Genres: Traditional

Tim Gibuma and the Storm is an Australian band fronted by Papua New Guinea-born singer-songwriter Timothy Mawi Gibuma. Their album The Gaba - Gaba Mawi was nominated for 2000 ARIA Award for Best World Music Album. It is an album of traditional music of the Torres Strait Islands.

== Discography ==
=== Albums ===
List of albums
Title	Album details
The Gaba - Gaba Mawi	Released: 1999; Label: CAAMA; Formats: CD

== Awards and nominations ==
=== ARIA Music Awards ===
The ARIA Music Awards is an annual awards ceremony that recognises excellence, innovation, and achievement across all genres of Australian music. They commenced in 1987.

Year	Nominee / work	Award	Result	Ref.
2000	The Gaba - Gaba Mawi	Best World Music Album	Nominated	
