= The Celts (band) =

Australian folk music band

- Genre: Folk
- Label: New Market Music
- Past members: Michael Caine; Jeremy Dunlop; Brian McLaughlin; Alex Black; Martin Ball

The Celts is an Australian folk music band. Members included: Michael Caine (mandolin & whistle), Jeremy Dunlop (guitar), Brian McLaughlin (vocals & bodhran), Alex Black and Martin Ball (fiddle & keyboards). Their second album, The Rocky Road, saw them nominated for the ARIA Award for Best World Music Album.

== Discography ==
=== Albums ===
Title	Details	Peak positions
Title	Details	AUS
The Celts	Released: 1993; Label: New Market Music (NEW 1056.2); Formats: CD	—
Rocky Road	Released: 1995; Label: New Market Music (NEW 1072.2); Formats: CD	—

== Awards and nominations ==
=== ARIA Music Awards ===
The ARIA Music Awards is an annual awards ceremony that recognises excellence, innovation, and achievement across all genres of Australian music. They commenced in 1987.

Year	Nominee / work	Award	Result	Ref.
1995	Rocky Road	Best World Music Album	Nominated	
