= Akin (band) =

Australian world fusion band

- Genres: World fusion

Akin is an Australian world fusion band. Their album Undercurrent was nominated for 2001 ARIA Award for Best World Music Album. They have toured Australia performing at festivals such as Port Fairy Folk, Melbourne Festival, Sydney Festival, National Folk Festival, Fairbridge Festival, Victor Harbour Folk Festival, and Woodford Folk Festival.

== Members ==
- Jenny Thomas
- Jason Day
- Glen Kniebeiss
- Chris Sprague

== Discography ==
=== Albums ===
List of albums
Title	Album details
Live	Released: 1999; Label: Akin (AKIN 002); Formats: CD
Undercurrent	Released: 2000; Label: Akin (AKIN 003); Formats: CD

== Awards and nominations ==
=== ARIA Music Awards ===
The ARIA Music Awards is an annual awards ceremony that recognises excellence, innovation, and achievement across all genres of Australian music. They commenced in 1987.

Year	Nominee / work	Award	Result	Ref.
2001	Undercurrent	Best World Music Album	Nominated	
