= Tara Tiba =

Tara Tiba تارا تیبا
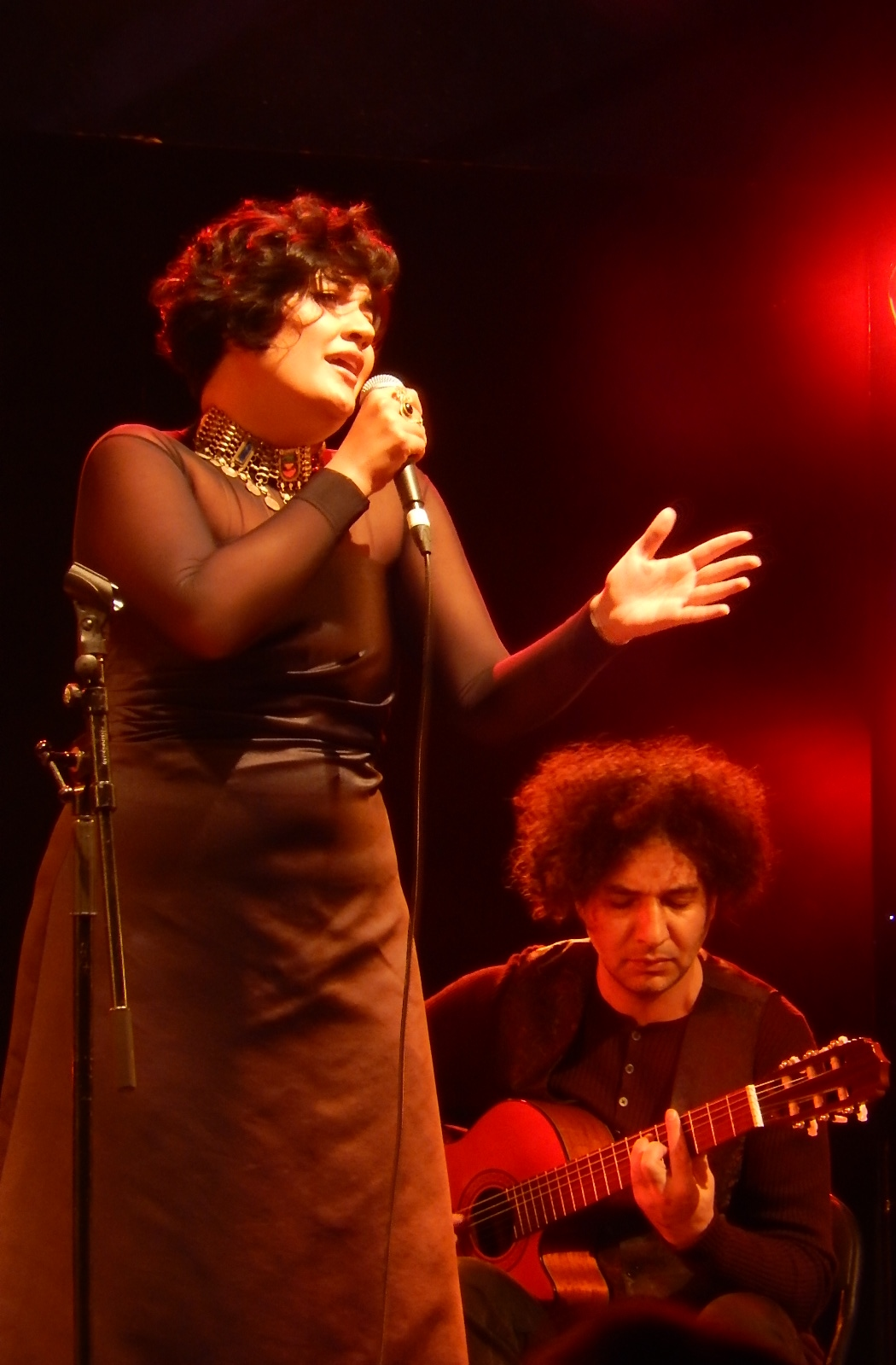

Background information
- Born: Tehran, Iran
- Origin: Perth, Australia
- Genres: World Music, Persian, Jazz
- Occupations: Musician, Singer, Song writer
- Instrument: Vocals
- Years active: 2013–present
- Label: Cezanne
- Website: https://www.taratiba.com/

Tara Tiba (Persian: تارا تیبا) is an Iranian born singer based in Australia. Her music genre is Persian traditional music singing with jazz, Latin and contemporary music. She has been nominated for 2019's ARIA Award for Best World Music Album.

Tiba recorded an EP in 2010 but was not able to get it released due to Iranian laws. She then moved to Perth in 2012 and released an album in 2014. She released a second album, Omid, in 2019.

== Discography ==
=== Albums ===
Title	Details	Peak positions
Title	Details	AUS
A Persian Dream	Released: June 2014; Label: Tara Tiba; Formats: CD, Digital	—
Omid	Released: April 2019; Label: Formats: CD, Digital	—

== Awards and nominations ==
=== ARIA Music Awards ===
The ARIA Music Awards is an annual awards ceremony that recognises excellence, innovation, and achievement across all genres of Australian music. They commenced in 1987.

Year	Nominee / work	Award	Result	Ref.
2019	Omid	Best World Music Album	Nominated	
