= Xenos (band) =

- Origin: Zürich, Switzerland
- Genres: Romani
- Years active: 1989–present
- Website: xenosmusic.com

Xenos are an Australian Romani music ensemble with a flexible roster of three to five core members and an extended line-up. They were formed in Zürich, Switzerland in 1989 playing Macedonian Roma music and relocated to south-eastern Australia in 1995.

Their third album, Tutti Frutti, was nominated at the 2001 ARIA Awards in the category, Best World Music Album.

== Members ==
- Rob Bester – fretless electric bass, davul, bagpipes
- Anne Hildyard – lead vocals, saxophone, gajda, zurna, clarinet
- Sabine Bester - lead vocals, trumpet, baritone
- Dave McNamara - trumpet, keys
- Dave Birch - baritone
- Oliver Platt - sousaphone

=== Past members ===
- Lee Hildyard – vocals
- Alister Price – piano accordion
- Matt De Boer – clarinet, kaval
- Josh Dunn – guitar
- Will Eager – drums
- Philip Griffin – guitar, lauto
- Greg Sheehan – drums
- Fuat Sazimanoski – drums
- Michael Karamitsos – drums
- Tunji Beier – drums
- Stephanos Elefteriadis – kemençe, drums
- Sophie Chapman – piano accordion
- Andy Busuttil –drums
- Christian Fotsch – bouzouki
- Marem Aliev – sax, clarinet
- Tahir Arsimov – drums
- Blair Greenberg – drums

== Discography ==
=== Albums ===
List of albums
Title	Album details
Let the Swine Loose	Released: 1991; Label: Arc Records (CF 2222); Formats: CD
My Mother Said	Released: 1993; Label: Formats: CD
New Moves	Released: 1997; Label: Formats: CD
Tutti Frutti	Released: 2001; Label: Formats: CD
Cirikli	Released: 2004; Label: Formats: CD
Florinalia	Released: 2008; Label: Formats: CD

== Awards and nominations ==
=== ARIA Music Awards ===
The ARIA Music Awards is an annual awards ceremony that recognises excellence, innovation, and achievement across all genres of Australian music. They commenced in 1987.

Year	Nominee / work	Award	Result	Ref.
2001	Tutti Frutti	Best World Music Album	Nominated	
