= Jacob Rumbiak =

West Papuan academic (born 1958)

Jacob Rumbiak (born March 11, 1958) is a West Papuan academic and political leader who has been in self-imposed exile in Australia after escaping from detention as a political prisoner for ten years in Indonesian gaols. Rumbiak is the Foreign Affairs representative of the Federated Republic of West Papua declared at the conclusion of the Third Papuan People's Congress on 19 October 2011. Rumbiak's advice from within West Papua to not attend the Congress for security reasons was vindicated in the crack-down which led to six deaths, hundreds of arrests and the sentencing of five of the principal figures to three years gaol each for treason.

Rumbiak was born in Yabon in the highland district of Ayamaru in Dutch New Guinea and was eight years old when the UN handed his country over to Indonesia in 1963. His parents are from Biak-Numfoor Island on the north coast. Both were primary school teachers, his father also a Protestant pastor. His mother died in 1982 when he was studying in West Java.

In 1967 his family fled to the jungle from the Indonesian military which had overtaken West Papua. There they were protected by the Free Papua Organization (OPM). Jacob became involved with the OPM and at a young age became a commander of troops. He finally returned to the towns and was exiled with an education scholarship to Java in 1978. Rumbiak graduated from the Indonesia University of Education in Bandung (where he spent nine years), with a BA (1982 Maths) and Masters (1987 Geography). By 1987 Jacob was an academic at the Indonesian National Scientific Institute; the Physical Geography Research Institute for East Indonesia; and the Environment Resource Institute of Indonesia.

In 1987 he was appointed to teach in Astronomy and Meteorology at Cenderawasih University in Jayapura. Jacob became increasingly politicised, and committed to a non-violent campaign of resistance based on universal concepts like 'justice, peace and love' he began educating student activists. Together with Dr Thomas Wainggai he established the West Melanesia Council. In 1988 Dr Wainggai and his wife were arrested, and the next year Jacob took refuge in the PNG Consulate in Jayapura. Despite the Indonesian assurances of his safety, when Jacob left the Consulate he was arrested, and in 1989 then sentenced to life imprisonment for subversion.

Rumbiak was moved through eight military and four civilian prisons, including five years on death row at Kalisosok where he completed a degree in theology. He then spent two and a half years in isolation at the top of a stone tower in Tangerang Prison (West Java); Jacob attests that his survival was only by God's grace. After intervention by the International Committee of the Red Cross, he was moved to Cipinang Penitentiary Institution, which he described in the foreword of Xanana Gusmão's autobiography as a 'first-class Indonesian jail'.

As a student, lecturer, and later in prison, Jacob studied and experimented with 'non-violence' and 'democracy' on the streets of Jakarta and West Java, helping to inspire the generation of Indonesian students who brought down President Suharto in 1998. With other intellectuals and ex-political prisoners he developed the West Melanesia Council, an indigenous non-violent Melanesian based movement for self- determination and independence which became the philosophical and political foundations of the West Papua National Authority.

In 1998, following the downfall of Suharto, he was released to 'house arrest' inside military barracks. The next year he managed to fly to East Timor as a UN-accredited electoral observer for the referendum, and escaped on a RAAF Hercules plane to Darwin. Jacob has lived in Australia since his escape in 1999, and has been an Australian citizen since 2006. He was a member of West Papua's delegation to the Pacific Islands Forum in Fiji in 2002, in New Zealand in 2003, and Fiji in 2006. In 2003 he was a member of West Papua's delegation to the European Union in Brussels. In 2004 he wrote a briefing paper for the British Government, and represented the West Papua National Authority at the Japanese Foreign Affairs Department in Tokyo. In 2005, he organized the West Papua National Authority delegation to the Melanesian Spearhead Group meeting in PNG, and in 2006 met the United Decolonization Committee in Fiji. In 2006 he attended the First Nation's International Solidarity meeting in Canada, and in 2007 co-hosted the first Melanesian Cultural Festival in the Netherlands. Rumbiak has dedicated himself to achieving self-determination for the people of West Papua by peaceful means.

On 19 Oct 2011 the Third Papuan People's Congress (Abepura, Jayapura) declared an independent Federal Republic of West Papua (FRWP), with Forkorus Yaboisembut appointed President and Edison Waromi appointed Prime Minister. Both were arrested and incarcerated with sentences of three years. Jacob Rumbiak has been appointed the Republic's Foreign Minister. On 23 June 2014 the Office of FRWP Dept Foreign Affairs, Immigration & Trade was opened in Docklands, Melbourne. In his opening speech Rumbiak stated that, according to State Administration theory, when a political society has established the five pre-requisites of a nation state, they are equal with other nation-states, and should be treated like one, and that West Papua has fulfilled those prerequisites, unlike America and Indonesia when they declared independence.

With a view to a successful application by West Papua to join the Melanesian Spearhead Group, at historic unity meetings in Vanuatu, on 6 Dec 2014 Rumbiak was elected as one of the five international representatives of the newly formed United Liberation Movement for West Papua, a unity body comprising the FRWP, the West Papua Coalition for Liberation and the West Papua National Parliament. On 14 July 2016 at a MSG Special Leader's Summit in Honiara, the ULMWP was admitted with Observer status, the decision on full membership being deferred for technical reasons.

== Music awards and nominations ==
=== ARIA Music Awards ===
The ARIA Music Awards is an annual awards ceremony that recognises excellence, innovation, and achievement across all genres of Australian music. They commenced in 1987.

Year	Nominee / work	Award	Result	Ref.
2011	Strange Birds in Paradise: A West Papuan Soundtrack (with David Bridie, Hein Arumisore, Ronny Kareni and Donny Roem)	Best World Music Album	Nominated	
