= Zela Margossian =

Australian pianist of Armenian heritage (born 1980)

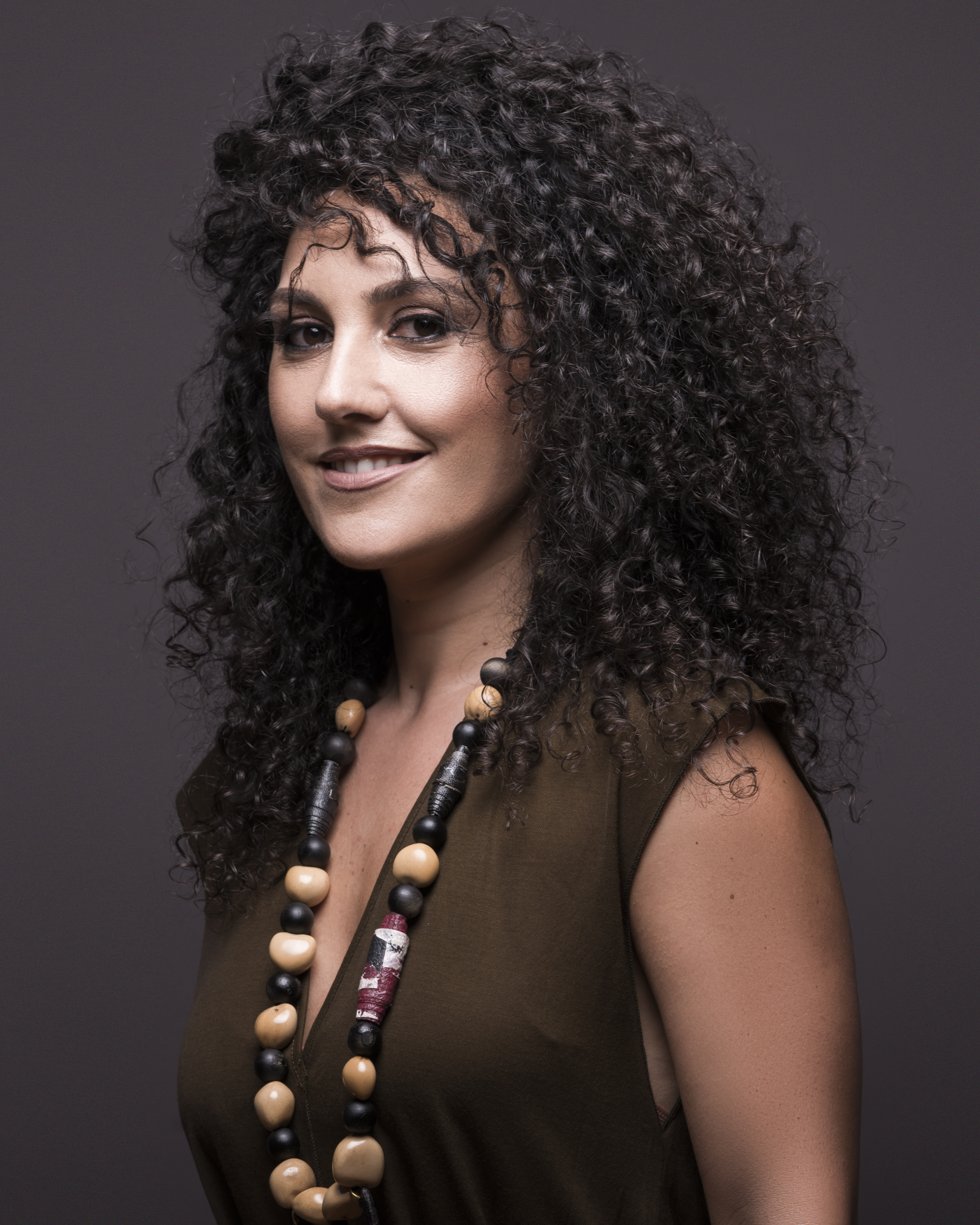
- Taken in 2018, Yerevan (Armenia) by Armen Aghayan

Background information
- Born: 09/06/1980; Beirut
- Origin: Armenian
- Genres: Jazz, World Music
- Occupation: Musician
- Instrument: Piano

Zela Margossian is an Australian pianist of Armenian heritage. Born in Beirut, she is currently based in Sydney.

She is the founder of the Zela Margossian Quintet that was nominated for an ARIA Award for Best World Music Album in 2019.

== Education ==
From 1988 to 1999, Margossian studied Piano Performance at Parsegh Ganatchian Hamazkaine Musical College in Beirut, Lebanon. She continued her education at the Lebanese Higher State Conservatory while earning a Bachelor of Arts with Honours in English Literature from the Haigaizian University in Beirut, Lebanon.

After graduating from Haigaizian University in 2002, she moved to Yerevan, Armenia to study at the Yerevan Komitas State Conservatory in the class of Vili Sargsyan. In 2007, Margossian earned a Master's degree in Piano Performance from the Yerevan Komitas State Conservatory.

While studying in Yerevan, Margossian developed an interest in ethno-jazz and moved to Sydney, Australia where she studied Jazz Piano Performance Course at the Sydney Conservatorium of Music.

== Career ==
After moving to Sydney, Margossian formed the critically acclaimed ethno-jazz band Zela Margossian Quintet. The band consisted of Alexander Inman-Hislop (drums), Adem Yilmaz (percussion), Jacques Emery (bass, Stuart Vandegraaff (wind instruments), and Elsen Price (bass). The band's music is heavily influenced by traditional Armenian music.

Since its foundation, the band has been performing its original repertoire throughout the world, making appearances at international jazz festivals including Jazz Women's Festival (2017), Beirut Jazz Festival (2018), and Sydney Improvised Music Association Winter Jazz Program (2018). The quintet also toured around Australia and the world, performing in Canberra, Melbourne, Hobart, Auckland, and Wellington.

Zela Margossian Quintet released its debut album Transition in November 2018. The release has been positively reviewed by The Sydney Morning Herald, DownBeat, Jazzwise, Heavy Blog is Heavy, and Everything is Noise. The album was nominated for the Best World Music Album at ARIA Awards in 2019.

Outside of the band, Zela Margossian gives private lessons at Zealous Music.

== Discography ==
=== Albums ===
Title	Details	Peak positions
Title	Details	AUS
Transition	Released: November 2018; Label: Art As Catharsis Records; Formats: CD, Digital	—

== Awards and nominations ==
=== ARIA Music Awards ===
The ARIA Music Awards is an annual awards ceremony that recognises excellence, innovation, and achievement across all genres of Australian music. They commenced in 1987.

Year	Nominee / work	Award	Result	Ref.
2019	Transition	ARIA Award for Best World Music Album	Nominated	
