= Epizo Bangoura and African Express =

- Origin: New York City, New York, United States
- Genres: World
- Years active: 1993–2004
- Past members: Epizo Banguoura

Epizo Bangoura and African Express were an Australian-based band formed by Guinean-born percussionist, Abdoulaye "Epizo" Bangoura. At the ARIA Music Awards of 2001, their album, Inchallah, was nominated for Best World Music Album. They were named Best Live Act at the World Music Awards where Bangoura was also Best Instrumentalist and Best Male.

== History ==
Abdoulaye "Epizo" Bangoura was born in Conakry, Guinea and has younger brothers, Mohamed and Sibo Bangoura. Bangoura learnt to play percussion instruments: djembe and balafon. He relocated to France in 1984 and then to New York City in the early 1990s, there he formed Epizo Bangoura and African Express. In 1996 he migrated to Australia where he formed a new version of African Express.

Bangoura released his debut album, N' Na by Epizo in 1998 and followed with Inchallah by Epizo Bangoura and African Express in 2000. At the ARIA Music Awards of 2001 it was nominated for Best World Music Album.

== Discography ==
=== Albums ===
List of albums
Title	Album details
N' Na	Released: 1998; Label: Formats: CD
Inchallah	Released: 2000; Label: Global Groove Records (ABE002CD); Formats: CD
N'NA nin N'FA	Released: 2007; Label: Formats: CD

== Awards and nominations ==
=== ARIA Music Awards ===
The ARIA Music Awards is an annual awards ceremony that recognises excellence, innovation, and achievement across all genres of Australian music. They commenced in 1987.

Year	Nominee / work	Award	Result	Ref.
2001	Inchallah	Best World Music Album	Nominated	
