= The Wizard of Oz (2001 album) =

The Wizard of Oz, subtitled Live Australian Cast Recording is a cast recording of the 2001 Australian production of the stage musical The Wizard of Oz, featuring Nikki Webster. It was nominated for the 2002 ARIA Award for Best Cast or Show Album.

== Background ==
In 2001 an Australian musical theatre staging of The Wizard of Oz, an adaptation of The Wonderful Wizard of Oz toured the country. It was directed by Nancye Hayes with Peter Casey as musical director. It ran from November 2001 until December 2002 and featured Nikki Webster as Dorothy.

The Wizard of Oz was first staged at the Lyric Theatre in Sydney before moving to the Regent Theatre in Melbourne then onto the Lyric Theatre in South Brisbane.

== Cast ==
- Nikki Webster - Dorothy
- Kane Alexander - Scarecrow (NSW)
- Derek Metzger - Scarecrow (Vic, Qld)
- Philip Gould - Tinman
- Doug Parkinson - Cowardly Lion
- Bert Newton - Wizard of Oz
- Delia Hannah - Glinda (NSW)
- Patti Newton - Glinda (Vic, Qld)
- Pamela Rabe - Wicked Witch
- Tony Geappen - Uncle Henry

== Soundtrack ==
The original cast recording was released in 2001 through BMG Australia.

Track list:

1. Overture
2. Over the Rainbow
3. Cyclone
4. Come Out Come Out
5. It Really Was No Miracle
6. We Thank You Very Sweetly
7. Ding Dong! The Witch Is Dead
8. As Mayor of the Munchkin City
9. As Coroner I Must Aver
10. Ding Dong! The Witch Is Dead (Reprise)
11. Lullaby League
12. Lollipop Guild
13. We Welcome You to Munchkinland
14. Follow the Yellow Brick Road - You're Off To See The Wizard
15. If I Only Had a Brain
16. We're Off To See The Wizard (Duo)
17. If I Only Had a Heart
18. We're Off To See The Wizard (Trio)
19. Lions, Tigers And Bears
20. If I Only Had the Nerve
21. We're Off To See The Wizard (Quartet)
22. Out Of The Woods
23. Entr'acte
24. Merry Old Land Of Oz
25. If I Were King of the Forest
26. Jitterbug
27. Witchmelt
28. Curtain Calls
29. Over The Rainbow (Reprise)

Webster released "Over the Rainbow" as a single along with another song, "The Best Days". The double A side single peaked at #21 on the ARIA Singles Chart and was certified gold.
