= Coda (Australian band) =

- Origin: Sydney
- Genre: art-rock
- Years active: 1994 -

Coda (stylised as CODA) is a Sydney-based art-rock band. They mix classical strings and contemporary music. Their album There Is A Way To Fly was nominated for the ARIA Award for Best World Music Album at the ARIA Music Awards of 2002. and Calling Mission Mu was nominated for the same award in 2007.

== Members ==
- Nick Wales - keyboards, viola
- Naomi Radom - violin, accordion
- Jared Underwood - drums
- Bree Van Reyk - vibraphone, percussion

Former members

- Zoe Hauptman - bass
- Jeremy Barnett - vibraphone, percussion
- Oliver Smith - bass
- Veronique Serret - violin
- Mina Kanaridis - vocals
- Ed Goyer - drums
- Matthew Steffen - bass
- Kim Moyes - percussion

== Discography ==
=== Studio albums ===
| Title | Details |
|---|---|
| There Is a Way to Fly | Released: October 2001; Label: Silent Recordings (SIL002); Format: CD, digital download |
| Calling Mission Mu | Released: October 2006; Label: Silent Recordings (SIL015); Format: CD, digital download |
| Golden Times | Released: July 2016; Label: Silent Recordings (SIL019); Format: digital download |

=== Extended Plays ===
| Title | Details |
|---|---|
| For Our Animal Friends | Released: 2004; Label: Silent Recordings (SIL012); Format: CD, digital download |

== Awards and nominations ==
=== ARIA Music Awards ===
The ARIA Music Awards is an annual awards ceremony that recognises excellence, innovation, and achievement across all genres of Australian music.

| Year | Nominee / work | Award | Result | Ref. |
|---|---|---|---|---|
| 2002 | There Is A Way To Fly | Best World Music Album | Nominated | |
| 2007 | Calling Mission Mu | Best World Music Album | Nominated | |
