= Wicked Beat Sound System =

Electronica/dub/soul group from Sydney

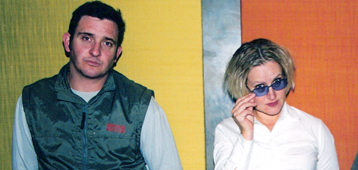
- Damian Robinson and Linda Janssen

Background information
- Origin: Sydney, Australia
- Genres: Electronica; Dub; Soul
- Years active: 1992 – present
- Labels: Mushroom Records; Wicked Beat Records
- Members: Linda Janssen; Damian Robinson
- Past members: MC KYE; Dave Carnovale
- Website: Official website

Wicked Beat Sound System is a Sydney-based group whose sound is best described as a mixture of electronica, dub and soul. The group formed in 1992, following a series of live "jams" instigated by DJ Dave Carnovale (Crucial D) in collaboration with Damian Robinson and other DJs Scott Pullen and Mark Walton which took place at the Bentley Bar c. 1991 in Sydney's Darlinghurst area. They have released five albums to date. Originally featuring reggae and hip hop, the group expanded their sound to incorporate elements of soul, jazz, Latin, funk and breaks. They have been nominated for three ARIA Music Awards and an Australian Dance Music Award as well as creating dozens of remixes for others.

The lineup of the group was originally Linda Janssen and MC KYE on vocals, alongside producers Damian Robinson and DJ Dave Carnovale. Over the years many other artists have been included in the lineup of the 'Live' band including Marko Simec (Waiting For Guinness), the late Bruce (Babs) Clarke, well known breaks producer Andy Page, Dave Norris (Nubreed) as well as current performers Gerard Masters, Ian Mussington and Cameron Undy. Dave Carnovale departed the band in 2003 to concentrate on his 'Dubnosis' project and MC Kye departed the band shortly after the release of their fourth album 4ormation in 2005 to work on his Budspells Album. They have headlined their own tours and have supported Ben Harper and The Fugees

== History ==
Wicked Beat Sound System's first single releases, "Stand Up", "Inside" and "Summer Sun", were produced by John Prior at Unity Gain Studios. "Stand Up" was the group's first video, "Inside" and "Summer Sun" were originally released on Matt Hayward's independent label One Movement, while "Summer Sun" was picked up by DJ Andy Glitre and continued to receive high rotation on national radio network Triple J for several years. The first album release, Music From The Core was also originally released on One Movement in 1996 and the single "Local MP" also achieved high radio rotation. These tracks were featured on the soundtrack to the French film Clubbed to Death (Lola). They collaborated with other local artists such as Yothu Yindi, Directions in Groove, Deborah Conway, Iva Davies, Christine Anu and Renee Geyer.

The second album, Inna Styles was released through Mushroom Records in 1999, followed by an extensive touring schedule. Three singles from the album "I Don't Wanna know", "Church of Al Green", and "Stay With Me Til Dawn" were again featured on Triple J. The album also featured dancefloor tracks "Cookin' with Kazz" and "Genie of the Lab".

In 2000 Wicked Beat Sound System received an ARIA nomination for Inna Styles and a Dance Music Award nomination (DMA) for Best Band. They also played festivals across Australia including the Perth International Arts Festival, Vibes On a Summer's Day and the closing of the Sydney Paralympics.

In September 2002, the third album, New Soul Breaks, was released and featured vocal tracks by Janssen including "I Want To" and "Brand New Day", as well as instrumental tracks "Do The Tings" and "Ounce Of Swing". In the same year they received another ARIA nomination for "Best Dance Release". In 2005 Wicked Beat Sound System released 4ormation featuring the track "Nightmare". Shortly after the release of 4ormation MC Kye departed the group to concentrate on his solo project and the group ceased touring for a period of time. In 2006, Wicked Beat Sound System, now largely Robinson and Janssen, recorded Hydromajestik which was released on 24 March 2007. More in the vein of their previous Inna Styles album, this album featured vocal tracks in addition to dub-influenced instrumentals. The first single was "Won't Let Go".

In 2008 WBSS released the album Dreaming, originally a commissioned piece of work written by Damian Robinson. He was approached by Indigenous Artistic director Rhoda Roberts to compose the music for a Cleansing Ceremony she was directing called Sydney Dreaming which was to be a theatrical adaptation of the rainmaker creation story. Since that performance, variations of this music have been performed at several festivals and ceremonies including Woodford Festival and Perth Festival. Dreaming was the culmination of several years' work. The original concept was penned in the heat of a Byron Bay summer and completed in WB's studio in Sydney and then Bungendore. The themes revolve around Salt Water, Fresh Water and Desert, three dividing realities for Aboriginal people's connection to country.

The Dreaming album was nominated for an ARIA Award in 2009 in the category of Best World Music Album.

Reworked variations from this album were used to make the soundtrack for the Lighting of the Sydney Opera House Sails for Vivid Festival 2016 along with Badu Gili (meaning 'water light' in the language of the traditional owners of Bennelong Point), which accompanies a contemporary Aboriginal art projection performed each evening year-round on the western sails of the Sydney Opera House.

In 2017 Robinson was also commissioned to compose the soundtrack for the Parrtjima Festival at Alice Springs. The festival involved five Aboriginal art centres and showcased the work of 20 Aboriginal artists. Parrtjima (pronounced Par-CHee-ma) means 'lighting up' and conveys two meanings: physically illuminating an object with light and 'lighting up' as in to shed light and understanding on a subject. This public event transformed Alice Springs Desert Park into a mesmerising outdoor gallery of light and sound including a breathtaking illumination of a 300-million-year-old natural canvas, 2 km of the majestic MacDonnell Ranges, a series of new installations involving Aboriginal artists from the Central Desert Region.

== Discography ==
=== Studio albums ===
List of studio albums, with selected details and chart positions
Title	Album details	Peak chart positions
Title	Album details	AUS
Music from the Core	Released: 1996; Label: One Movement (OM14); Formats: CD	154
Inna Styles	Released: 1999; Label: Mushroom (MUSH332502); Formats: CD	43
New Soul Breaks	Released: September 2002; Label: Wicked Beat (WBR01), Roadshow Music (300723-2); Formats: CD	53
4ormation	Released: 2004; Label: Wicked Beat, Inertia Distribution (WBR02); Formats: CD	—
Hydromajestik	Released: 2007; Label: Wicked Beat, Inertia Distribution (WBR03); Formats: CD	—
Dreaming	Released: 2008; Label: Wicked Beat, Inertia Distribution (WBR04); Formats: CD, digital	—

=== Charting singles ===
List of singles, with selected chart positions (to top 200)
Title	Year	Chart positions
Title	Year	AUS
"Local MP"	1997	162
"Stay With Me 'til Dawn"	1999	149
"I Want To"	2002	113
"Brand New Day" / "Do the Thing"	2002	133

== Awards ==
=== ARIA Music Awards ===
The ARIA Music Awards is an annual awards ceremony that recognises excellence, innovation, and achievement across all genres of Australian music. They commenced in 1987. Wicked Beat Sound System were nominated for four awards.

Year	Nominee / work	Award	Result
1997	Music from the Core	Best Dance Release	Nominated
2000	Inna Styles	Best Dance Release	Nominated
2003	New Soul Breaks	Best Dance Release	Nominated
2009	Dreaming	Best World Music Album	Nominated
