= 2000 ARIA Music Awards =

Annual Australian music awards

- Date: 24 October 2000
- Venue: Sydney Entertainment Centre, Sydney, New South Wales

Highlights
- Most wins: Killing Heidi (4); Madison Avenue (4)
- Most nominations: Madison Avenue (8)
- Website: ariaawards.com.au

Television/radio coverage
- Network: Network Ten

The 14th Australian Recording Industry Association Music Awards (generally known as the ARIA Music Awards or simply the ARIAs) was held on 24 October 2000 at the Sydney Entertainment Centre. Presenters distributed 28 awards with the big winners for the year being Killing Heidi and Madison Avenue, each with four trophies. In addition to the annually presented awards, a "Special Achievement Award" was given to Daryl Somers; an "Outstanding Achievement Award" was received by Slim Dusty and another presented to Tina Arena. There were no ARIA Hall of Fame inductees.

== Awards ==
Final nominees for awards are shown in plain, with winners in bold.

=== ARIA Awards ===
- Album of the Year
  - **Killing Heidi – Reflector**
    - David Bridie – Act of Free Choice
    - Alex Lloyd – Black the Sun
    - Savage Garden – Affirmation
    - Shihad – The General Electric
- Single of the Year
  - **Madison Avenue – "Don't Call Me Baby"**
    - 28 Days – "Rip It Up"
    - Kasey Chambers – "The Captain"
    - Killing Heidi – "Mascara"
    - Powderfinger – "Passenger"
- Highest Selling Album
  - **Savage Garden – Affirmation**
    - Bardot – Bardot
    - Killing Heidi – Reflector
    - Taxiride – Imaginate
    - Vanessa Amorosi – The Power
- Highest Selling Single
  - **Madison Avenue – "Don't Call Me Baby"**
    - Bardot – "Poison"
    - Chris Franklin – "Bloke"
    - S2S – "Sister"
    - Vanessa Amorosi – "Absolutely Everybody"
- Best Group
  - **Killing Heidi – Reflector**
    - Madison Avenue – "Don't Call Me Baby"
    - Powderfinger – "Passenger"
    - Savage Garden – Affirmation
    - Shihad – The General Electric
- Best Female Artist
  - **Kasey Chambers – "The Captain"**
    - Diana Ah Naid – I Don't Think I'm Pregnant
    - Vanessa Amorosi – "Absolutely Everybody"
    - Christine Anu – "Sunshine on a Rainy Day"
    - Kylie Minogue – "Spinning Around"
- Best Male Artist
  - **Alex Lloyd – Black the Sun**
    - David Bridie – Act of Free Choice
    - Endorphin – Skin
    - Groove Terminator – Road Kill
    - Paul Kelly – Smoke
- Breakthrough Artist – Album
  - **Killing Heidi – Reflector**
    - Vanessa Amorosi – The Power
    - Alex Lloyd – Black the Sun
    - Sonic Animation – Orchid for the Afterworld
    - Taxiride – Imaginate
- Breakthrough Artist – Single
  - **Madison Avenue – "Don't Call Me Baby"**
    - 28 Days – "Rip it Up"
    - Vanessa Amorosi – "Have a Look"
    - Augie March – "Asleep in Perfection (Waltz)"
    - Lo-Tel – "Teenager of the Year"
- Best Dance Release
  - **Pnau – Sambanova**
    - Chili HiFly – "Is it Love?"
    - Madison Avenue – "Don't Call Me Baby"
    - Sonic Animation – Orchid for the Underworld
    - Wicked Beat Sound System – Inna Styles
- Best Pop Release
  - **Kylie Minogue – "Spinning Around"**
    - Vanessa Amorosi – "Absolutely Everybody"
    - Frenzal Rhomb – "Never Had So Much Fun"
    - Savage Garden – Affirmation
    - Spiderbait – "Glokenpop"
- Best Rock Album
  - **Killing Heidi – Reflector**
    - Area 7 – Bitter & Twisted
    - Deadstar – Somewhere Over the Radio
    - Grinspoon – Easy
    - Shihad – The General Electric
- Best Country Album
  - **Troy Cassar-Daley – Big River**
    - Adam Brand – Good Friends
    - Lee Kernaghan – Rules of the Road
    - Keith Urban – Keith Urban
    - John Williamson – The Way It Is
- Best Blues & Roots Album
  - **Matt Walker – Soul Witness**
    - Peter Gelling – Bluestime
    - Ruby Hunter – Feeling Good
    - Neil Murray – Wondering Kind
    - Mick Thomas – Under Starters Orders
- Best Independent Release
  - **S2S – "Sister"**
    - Diana Ah Naid – "I Don't Thing I'm Pregnant"
    - iOTA – "The Hip Bone Connection"
    - Skulker – Too Fat for Tahiti
    - Stella One Eleven – "Only Good for Conversation"
- Best Alternative Release
  - **Dirty Three – Whatever You Love, You Are**
    - 28 Days – "Rip It Up"
    - David Bridie – Act of Free Choice
    - Nokturnl – "Neva Mend"
    - Tumbleweed – Mumbo Jumbo
- Best Adult Contemporary Album
  - **Karma County – Into the Land of Promise**
    - Marcia Hines – The Time of Our Lives
    - Icecream Hands – Sweeter Than the Radio
    - Michael Spiby – Ho's Kitchen
    - Vika and Linda – Two Wings
- Best Comedy Release
  - **Guido Hatzis – Do Not Talk Over Me**
    - Greg Champion – Stand Back Australia
    - Club Veg – We Suck – The Best of Sucked in Calls
    - Chris Franklin – "Bloke"
    - Elliot Goblet – Internally Berserk

=== Fine Arts Awards ===
- Best Jazz Album
  - **James Muller Trio – All Out**
    - Australian Art Orchestra, Sruthi Laya Ensemble – Into the Fire
    - The Catholics – Barefoot
    - Mike Nock, Marty Ehrlich – The Waiting Game
    - Janet Seidel – Art of Lounge Vol 2
- Best Classical Album
  - **Gerard Willems – Beethoven: Complete Piano Sonatas**
    - Rosamund Illing, Richard Bonynge, Australian Opera and Ballet Orchestra – Amoureuse: Sacred and Profane Arias
    - Michael Kieran Harvey – Messiaen: Twenty Contemplations of the Infant Jesus
    - Simon Tedeschi – Simon Tedeschi
    - Richard Tognetti, Australian Chamber Orchestra – Beethoven Violin Concerto & Mozart Symphony No. 40
- Best Children's Album
  - **Hi-5 – Jump And Jive With Hi-5**
    - The Flowerpot Gang – Flower Pot Gang
    - Franciscus Henri – Mister Whiskers: Monkey Business
    - Play School – Hullabaloo
    - The Wiggles – It's a Wiggly Wiggly World
- Best Original Cast / Show Recording
  - **Cast Recording – The Sound of Music**
    - John Farnham – Live at the Regent
    - State Orchestra of Victoria, John Lanchbery – The Merry Widow
    - Various – Happy Days - The Arena Mega Musical
- Best Original Soundtrack
  - **David Bridie – In a Savage Land**
    - Iva Davies – The Ghost of Time
    - Paul Grabowsky – Siam Sunset
    - Various – Soft Fruit
    - Various – The Wog Boy
    - David Hirschfelder & Various Artists – What Becomes of the Broken Hearted?
- Best World Music Album
  - **Chris Duncan – Fyvies Embrace - The Golden Age of the Scottish Fiddle**
    - Riley Lee, Marshall McGuire – Spring Sea; Music for Shakuhachi and Harp
    - Timothy Kain and Virginia Taylor – Music of the Americas
    - Inka Marka – Auki Auki
    - Tim Gibuma and the Storm – The Gaba-Gaba Mawi

=== Artisan Awards ===
- Producer of the Year
  - **Steve James – Oblivia – "My Friend"**
    - Augie March, Richard Pleasance – Augie March – "Asleep in Perfection"
    - Darren Hayes, Daniel Jones – Savage Garden – Affirmation
    - Rob Taylor, Tim Freedman – The Whitlams – "You Gotta Love This City"
    - Andy Van, Cheyne Coates – Madison Avenue – "Don't Call Me Baby"
- Engineer of the Year
  - All nominees tied for the Award in this year
    - Doug Brady – John Farnham – Live at the Regent
    - Jonathan Burnside – Grinspoon – Easy
    - Brent Clarke – Christine Anu – "Sunshine on a Rainy Day"
    - Iva Davies, Simon Leadley – Iva Davies – The Ghost of Time
    - Steve James – Oblivia – "My Friend"
- Best Video
  - **Mark Hartley – Madison Avenue – "Who the Hell Are You"**
    - Bart Borghese – Nokturnl – "Neva Mend"
    - Mark Hartley – Bardot – "Poison"
    - Mark Hartley – Madison Avenue – "Don't Call Me Baby"
    - Paul Butler, Scott Walton – Regurgitator – "Happiness (Rotting My Brain)"
- Best Cover Art
  - **Janet English – Spiderbait – "Glokenpop"**
    - Mark Gowling – Groove Terminator – Road Kill
    - Paul Kosky – Killing Heidi – Reflector
    - Love Police – Various – Triple J Hottest 100 Vol 6
    - Kevin Wilkins – Powderfinger – "Passenger"

== Achievement awards ==
=== Outstanding Achievement Award ===
- Tina Arena "for selling in excess of one million albums across Europe."

Arena reflected on the award, "I have been around a long time. I've had an incredible time and I'm still learning many things. Receiving the award is wonderful as it's great to be recognised for the work you put in. I'm very proud." She described her colleagues, "I've worked with some wonderful people in Europe, like Desmond Child (worked with Ricky Martin) and Matthew Wilder (worked with No Doubt)."

- Slim Dusty "for a career spanning over five decades (100 albums)."

Dusty described his works, "I started making private records in 1942 and got accepted to a recording contract of kind in 1946. It's hard to believe that I've done this many records. I still record very fast, getting the tracks down quickly, and I like to have young people around me in the process."

=== Special Achievement Award ===
- Daryl Somers "for the contribution that Hey Hey It's Saturday made in providing an outlet for Australian artists to showcase their music." Hey Hey It's Saturday (1971–1977, 1979–1999, 2009–2010, 2021, 2022) was an Australian TV variety show hosted and co-produced by Somers.

== ARIA Hall of Fame inductees ==
There were no Hall of Fame inductees.

== Performers ==
Performers included:

- Killing Heidi – "Superman/Supergirl"
- 28 Days
- Bardot – "These Days"
- The Living End
- Christine Anu
- Madison Avenue – "Don't Call Me Baby"
