= Timothy Kain and Virginia Taylor =

Australian music duo

Timothy Kain and Virginia Taylor are an Australian music duo based in Canberra. Their album Music of the Americas was nominated for 2000 ARIA Award for Best World Music Album.

Timothy Kain was born on 25 January 1951, outside Canberra.

== Members ==
- Timothy Kain - guitar
- Virginia Taylor - flute

== Discography ==
=== Albums ===
List of albums
Title	Album details
For Flute & Guitar	Released: 1991; Label: Tall Poppies (TP003); Formats: CD
The Mantis and the Moon (Guitar Duets from Around the World) (with John Williams)	Released: 1995; Label: Sony Classical (SK 62007); Formats: CD
Music of the Americas	Released: 1999; Label: ABC Classics (456 691-2); Formats: CD
Mirrors on Fire	Released: 2004; Label: Tall Poppies (TP169); Formats: CD
Character Interludes	Released: 2011; Label: Move (MCD-454); Formats: CD

== Awards and nominations ==
=== ARIA Music Awards ===
The ARIA Music Awards is an annual awards ceremony that recognises excellence, innovation, and achievement across all genres of Australian music. They commenced in 1987.

Year	Nominee / work	Award	Result	Ref.
2000	Music of the Americas	Best World Music Album	Nominated	
