= Inka Marka =

Inka Marka (meaning Force of the Incas) is an Australian band that plays Bolivian, Peruvian and Ecuadorian music. Their album Auki Auki was nominated for 2000 ARIA Award for Best World Music Album.

== Members ==
- Jose Diaz Rodriguez
- Michel Bestrin
- Raul Reinal
- Karen Ivanyi
- Limbert Angulo

Former members

- Orlando Arias
- Enqrique Berbis
- Henry Saavedra
- John Paul Pincheira
- Rodrigo Santelices
- Cristian Seguin
- Jaime Carrasco
- Juan Paredes
- Andrew Mellado
- Jorge Cuiza
- John Kendall
- Nicholas Sajeropolous

== Discography ==
=== Albums : These are the albums of Inka Marka Music of the Andes (based in Australia) ===
NOT to be confused with the Peruvian Inka marka based in Cusco ( whoever did the last discography )

- Ripusani : 1996 Produced and distributed Inka Marka
- Kusi Kuna : 1997 Produced and distributed Inka Marka
- Entre Los Amigos :1997 Produced and distributed Mabuhay Records
- Auki Auki :1999 Produced by and distributed Market Music
- Valle de la Luna : 2001 Produced and distributed Black Market Music
- Wirachocha : 2002 Produced and distributed Black Market Music
- Shaman : 2005 Produced and distributed Black Market Music
- Misa Criolla : 2004 Produced and distributed Black Market Music
- Quilla Tierra de Suenos : 2011 Produced and distributed Inka Marka
- En Vivo : 2012 Produced and distributed Inka Marka
- Mama Luna : 2012 Produced and distributed Inka Marka

== Awards and nominations ==
=== ARIA Music Awards ===
The ARIA Music Awards is an annual awards ceremony that recognises excellence, innovation, and achievement across all genres of Australian music. They commenced in 1987.

Year	Nominee / work	Award	Result	Ref.
2000	Auki Auki	Best World Music Album	Nominated	
