= 2001 ARIA Music Awards =

Annual Australian music awards

- Date: 30 October 2001
- Venue: Capitol Theatre, Sydney, New South Wales

Highlights
- Most wins: Powderfinger (6)
- Most nominations: The Avalanches (9)
- Website: ariaawards.com.au

Television/radio coverage
- Network: Nine Network

The 15th Annual Australian Recording Industry Association Music Awards (generally known as the ARIA Music Awards) were held on 30 October 2001 at the Capitol Theatre. Rock band Powderfinger won the most awards with six from eight nominations. Leading the nominations were dance, electronic group, The Avalanches, with nine nominations: they won four.

== Awards ==
The following list includes the winners, highlighted in bold, and the other final nominations below them.

=== ARIA Awards ===
- Album of the Year
  - **Powderfinger – Odyssey Number Five**
    - The Avalanches – Since I Left You
    - Kylie Minogue – Light Years
    - Something for Kate – Echolalia
    - You Am I – Dress Me Slowly
- Single of the Year
  - **Powderfinger – "My Happiness"**
    - The Avalanches – "Frontier Psychiatrist"
    - Kylie Minogue – "On a Night Like This"
    - Something for Kate – "Monsters"
    - You Am I – "Damage"
- Highest Selling Album
  - **Powderfinger – Odyssey Number Five**
    - John Farnham – 33 1/3
    - Kylie Minogue – Light Years
    - Savage Garden – Affirmation
    - Slim Dusty – Looking Forward Looking Back
- Highest Selling Single
  - **Scandal'us – "Me, Myself & I"**
    - Human Nature – "He Don't Love You"
    - Nikki Webster – "Strawberry Kisses"
    - Powderfinger – "My Happiness"
    - Kylie Minogue – "On A Night Like This"
- Best Group
  - **Powderfinger – Odyssey Number Five**
    - The Avalanches – Since I Left You
    - Killing Heidi – "Superman Supergirl"
    - Something for Kate – Echolalia
    - You Am I – Dress Me Slowly
- Best Female Artist
  - **Kylie Minogue – Light Years**
    - Christine Anu – Come My Way
    - Jodi Phillis – In Dreams I Live
    - Leah Haywood – "Takin' Back What's Mine"
    - Vanessa Amorosi – The Power
- Best Male Artist
  - **Nick Cave – No More Shall We Part**
    - John Butler – Three
    - Paul Kelly – Roll on Summer
    - Paul Mac – "Just the Thing"
    - Tex Perkins – Dark Horses
- Breakthrough Artist – Album
  - **The Avalanches – Since I Left You**
    - Augie March – Sunset Studies
    - John Butler Trio – Three
    - Lo-Tel – Planet of the Stereos
    - 28 Days – Upstyledown
- Breakthrough Artist – Single
  - **The Avalanches – "Frontier Psychiatrist"**
    - Eskimo Joe – "Who Sold Her Out"
    - George – "Special Ones"
    - The John Butler Trio – John Butler Trio EP
    - Lash – "Take Me Away"
- Best Pop Release
  - **Kylie Minogue – Light Years**
    - Christine Anu – Come My Way
    - Invertigo – "Chances Are"
    - Madison Avenue – The Polyester Embassy
    - Vanessa Amorosi – The Power
- Best Dance Release
  - **The Avalanches – Since I Left You**
    - Infusion – Phrases and Numbers
    - [Love] Tattoo – "The Bass Has Got Me Movin'"
    - Paul Mac – "Just the Thing"
    - Sgt Slick – "Let It Ride"
- Best Rock Album
  - **Powderfinger – Odyssey Number Five**
    - The Living End – Roll On
    - The Mark of Cain – This Is This...
    - Motor Ace – Five Star Laundry
    - The Superjesus – Jet Age
- Best Country Album
  - **Slim Dusty – Looking Forward Looking Back**
    - Audrey Auld – The Fallen
    - Beccy Cole – Wild at Heart
    - Gina Jeffreys – Angel
    - Sara Storer – Chasing Buffalo
- Best Independent Release
  - **John Butler Trio – Three**
    - Allan Browne's New Rascals – East St Kilda Toodleoo
    - Nitocris – "Manic"
    - Pre-Shrunk – Digital Sunrise
    - Stella One Eleven – In Your Hands
- Best Alternative Release
  - **Art of Fighting – Wires**
    - Big Heavy Stuff – Size of the Ocean
    - Magic Dirt – What Are Rock Stars Doing Today
    - Something for Kate – Echolalia
    - You Am I – Dress Me Slowly
- Best Adult Contemporary Album
  - **Mark Seymour – One Eyed Man**
    - Jodi Phillis – In Dreams I Live
    - John Farnham – 33 1/3
    - Stella One Eleven – In Your Hands
    - Wendy Matthews – Beautiful View
- Best Blues & Roots Album
  - **Collard Greens & Gravy – More Gravy**
    - Andy Cowan – 10.30pm Thursdays
    - Jeff Lang – Everything Is Still
    - John Butler Trio – Three
    - The Revelators – The Adventures of The Amazing Revelators
- Best Children's Album
  - **Hi-5 – It's a Party**
    - George Spartels, Queensland Philharmonic Orchestra, Sean O'Boyle – George Meets the Orchestra
    - The Hooley Dooleys – Keep On Dancing
    - Monica Trapaga – I Love the Zoo
    - The Wiggles – Hoop Dee Doo: It's a Wiggly Party
- Best Comedy Release
  - **Guido Hatzis – Whatever...**
    - The 12th Man – "Bruce 2000"
    - Chris Franklin – "Mullet Head"
    - The Drugs – The Only Way Is Up
    - Rodney Rude – Ya Mum's Bum

=== Fine Arts Awards ===
- Best Jazz Album
  - **Bernie McGann Trio – Bundeena**
    - Allan Browne's New Rascals – East St Kilda Toodleoo
    - Andrew Robson Trio – Sunman
    - Joe Chindamo Trio – The Joy of Standards
    - Michelle Nicolle – After the Rain
    - Paul Grabowsky Trio – Three
- Best Classical Album
  - **Genevieve Lacey, Australian Brandenburg Orchestra, Paul Dyer – Vivaldi – Ii Flauto Dolce**
    - Macquarie Trio – Schubert: Complete Piano Trios
    - Shu-Cheen Yu – Lotus Moon
    - Stephanie McCallum – Perfume
    - Woof! – Tuneful Percussion
- Best Original Cast / Show Production Recording
  - **Cast Recording – Shout! The Legend Of The Wild One**
    - Australian Concert Orchestra, Queensland Pops Orchestra, Harper – Scotland the Brave
    - David Chesworth – Wicked Voice
    - Janet Seidel – Doris and Me
    - Various – Sydney 2000 The Games of the XXVII Olympiad – Official Music from the Opening Ceremony
- Best Original Soundtrack Production Recording
  - **Melbourne Symphony Orchestra, Various – Music from the Motion Picture – The Dish**
    - David Hirschfelder, Various – Better Than Sex – Original Soundtrack
    - Lisa Gerrard with Hans Zimmer – More Music from Gladiator
    - Richard Pleasance, Various – The Very Best of SeaChange
    - Single Gun Theory – The Monkey's Mask
    - Various – Sydney 2000 The Games of the XXVII Olympiad – Official Music from the Opening Ceremony
- Best World Music Album
  - **Mara! – Live in Europe**
    - Akin – Undercurrent
    - Epizo Bangoura and African Express – Inchallah
    - George Telek – Serious Tam
    - Xenos – Tutti Frutti
- International Artist of the Year
  - **Craig David**
    - Limp Bizkit
    - U2
    - The Corrs
    - Anastacia

=== Artisan Awards ===
- Producer of the Year
  - **Bobbydazzler** (a.k.a. **Darren Seltmann**, **Robbie Chater**) – **The Avalanches** – **Since I Left You**
    - Augie March, Paul McKercher, Richard Pleasance – Augie March – Sunset Studies
    - Kalju Tonuma – Superheist – The Prize Recruit
    - The Mark of Cain – The Mark of Cain – This Is This...
    - Nick Launay – The Living End – Roll On
    - Paul Kosky – Killing Heidi – "Superman Supergirl"
- Engineer of the Year
  - **Paul McKercher, Chris Thompson, Richard Pleasance, Chris Dickie – Augie March – Sunset Studies**
    - Doug Brady – John Farnham – 33 1/3
    - Kalju Tonuma – Superheist – The Prize Recruit
    - Nick Launay – The Living End – Roll On
    - Tony Espie, Bobbydazzler (a.k.a. Darren Seltmann, Robbie Chater) – The Avalanches – Since I Left You
- Best Video
  - **Ben Saunders – Eskimo Joe – "Wake Up"**
    - Bart Borghesi – Something for Kate – "Monsters"
    - Mark Hartley – Human Nature – "He Don't Love You"
    - Mark Hartley – Invertigo – "Chances Are"
    - Paul Butler, Scott Walton – Gerling – "The Deer in You"
    - Paul Butler, Scott Walton – Powderfinger – "Like A Dog"
    - Scandal'us – "Me, Myself & I"
- Best Cover Art
  - **Kevin Wilkins – Powderfinger – Odyssey Number Five**
    - Bobbydazzler (a.k.a. Darren Seltmann, Robbie Chater) – The Avalanches – Since I Left You
    - Darren Glindemann – The Superjesus – Jet Age
    - Sam Hickey – Augie March – Sunset Studies
    - Stephanie Ashworth – Something for Kate – Echolalia

== Outstanding Achievement Award ==
- Keith Urban

== ARIA Hall of Fame inductees ==
The following were inducted into the Hall of Fame.

- INXS
- The Saints

== See also ==
- Australian music
