= The Barkers =

Australian contemporary folk band

The Barkers were an Australian contemporary folk band formed in 1993. Their second album Black Joke (1996) was nominated at the ARIA Music Awards of 1997 for Best World Music Album.

== History ==
The Barkers were formed in Adelaide in 1993. Members have included Terry Bradford on acoustic guitar and vocals, James Clark on acoustic bass guitar, Stuart Day on guitar, 12-string guitar, mandolin, banjo and fiddle, Imogen Lidgett on violin and vocals, Peter Lloyd on piano and Richard Tonkin on accordion, spoons, concertina and harmonica. They released four albums, The Barkers (1995), Black Joke (1996), Wolf (1998) and Templehill on Round Records, owned by Bradford. At the ARIA Music Awards of 1997 Black Joke was nominated for Best World Music Album. Bradford reformed the Barkers three performance in February–March 2017 at The Gov, Hindmarsh.

== Members ==
- Terry Bradford – acoustic guitar, vocals
- James Clark – acoustic bass guitar
- Stuart Day – guitar, 12-string guitar, mandolin, banjo, fiddle
- Steve Fleming –
- Imogen Lidgett – violin, vocals
- Peter Lloyd – piano
- Richard Tonkin – accordion, spoons, concertina, harmonica

== Discography ==
=== Albums ===
| Title | Details | Peak positions |
| Title | Details | AUS |
|---|---|---|
| The Barkers | Released: 1995; Label: Round Records; Formats: CD | — |
| Black Joke | Released: 1996; Label: Round Records (RR0027); Formats: CD | — |
| Wolf | Released: 1998; Label: Round Records; Formats: CD | — |
| Templehill | Released: Label: Round Records; Formats: CD | — |

== Awards and nominations ==
=== ARIA Music Awards ===
The ARIA Music Awards is an annual awards ceremony that recognises excellence, innovation, and achievement across all genres of Australian music. They commenced in 1987.

| Year | Nominee / work | Award | Result | Ref. |
|---|---|---|---|---|
| 1997 | The Black Joke | Best World Music Album | Nominated | |
