= Vardos =

Vardos are an Australian all-female violin, accordion and double bass gypsy trio based in Melbourne, known for their energetic performance style. Formed by Alana Hunt (violin) in Perth in 1993, Vardos relocated to Melbourne in 1998 where Sofia Chapman (accordion) joined the band. Kate Hosking (bass) joined later and was replaced by Melinda McCarthy (double bass) in 2003. Indra Buraczewska played double bass with Vardos from 2005- 2011 along with Frances Evans. Multi-instrumentalist Kirri Büchler took over on double bass in 2012 along with Maxine Sutcliffe in 2022. Hunt and Chapman have made trips to eastern Europe to study with folk and Romani musicians and have recorded six albums.

Vardos have toured to New Caledonia, New Zealand, Switzerland, Hungary, Amsterdam, London and the Edinburgh Fringe and have made cameo appearances on television including Spicks and Specks and Seachange on ABC television, and Painted Lady, a film about artist Vali Myers, shown on SBS in Australia, and the BBC news in Scotland. Vardos' version of Kylie Minogue's "I Should Be So Lucky" can be heard on the compilation CD "This is the Place for a Song" which was a finalist for an Aria award for Best World Music Album 2005.

== Discography ==
- Vardos (1999)
- Entertaining Countess Dracula (2002)
- Wild Side of the Village (2006)
- Until it's time to go (2011)
- Palazzo Party (2017)
- The Top Secret Violin Case (2020)
