= Mara! =

Australian world music quintet

- Origin: Sydney Australia
- Genres: World music, world/jazz fusion
- Years active: 30
- Labels: Mara Music, Rufus Records, Real World Records, Topic Records (UK), Laika Disc (Germany), Marquee Music (Japan)
- Members: Paul Cutlan; Lloyd Swanton; Sandy Evans; Llew Kiek; Mara Kiek
- Past members: Jim Denley; Michael Haughton; Tony Gorman; Stefan Kozuharov; Andrew Robson; Steve Elphick; Danny Thompson
- Website: www.maramusic.com.au

Mara! is an Australian world music quintet. They have won 2 ARIA Awards for Best World Music Album in 1996 (Ruino Vino) and 2001 (Live in Europe) and they were also nominated in 2006 (Sorella) and along with the Martenitsa Choir in 1997 (Sezoni).

== Members ==
=== Members ===
- Paul Cutlan - clarinets, saxophones
- Lloyd Swanton - bass
- Sandy Evans - saxophones
- Llew Kiek - guitar, bouzouki, baglama
- Mara Kiek - vocals, percussion

=== Former members ===
- Jim Denley - flute, alto sax
- Michael Haughton - tenor and soprano saxes
- Tony Gorman - clarinet and alto sax
- Steve Elphick - double bass
- Danny Thompson - double bass
- Andrew Robson - saxophones

=== Associate artists ===
- Stefan Kozuharov (librettist)
- Silvia Entcheva (vocalist)
- Daniele di Giovanni - engineer
- Guy Dickerson - engineer

=== Associate artists: Schools performers ===
- Tim Clarkson - horns
- Brendan Clarke - double bass
- Dave Ellis - double bass
- Loretta Palmeiro - horns
- Sam Gill - horns

== Discography ==
=== Albums ===
List of albums
Title	Album details
Images	Released: 1984; Label: Plant Life (PLR 070); Formats: LP, Cassette
On the Edge	Released: 1987; Label: Sandstock Music (SSM 025); Formats: LP, Cassette
Don't Even Think	Released: 1990; Label: Sandstock Music (SSM 042); Formats: LP, CD, Cassette
Ruino Vino	Released: 1995; Label: Rufus Records (RF013); Formats: CD
Sezoni (with Martenitsa Choir)	Released: June 1997; Label: Rufus Records (RF030); Formats: CD
Live in Europe	Released: April 2001; Label: Mara! Music (MM001); Formats: CD
Sorella	Released: 2005; Label: Mara! Music; Formats: CD
Tra Parole E Silenzio (with Martenitsa Choir)	Released: April 2012; Label: Mara! Music; Formats: CD, digital

== Awards and nominations ==
=== ARIA Awards ===
Mara! have won two ARIA Music Awards from four nominations, all in the same category: Best World Music Album.

Year	Nominee / work	Award	Result
1996	Rulno Vlno	Best World Music Album	Won
1997	Sezoni (with Martenitsa Choir)	Best World Music Album	Nominated
2001	Live in Europe	Best World Music Album	Won
2006	Sorella	Best World Music Album	Nominated
