= Deep Sea Arcade =

Australian indie rock music band

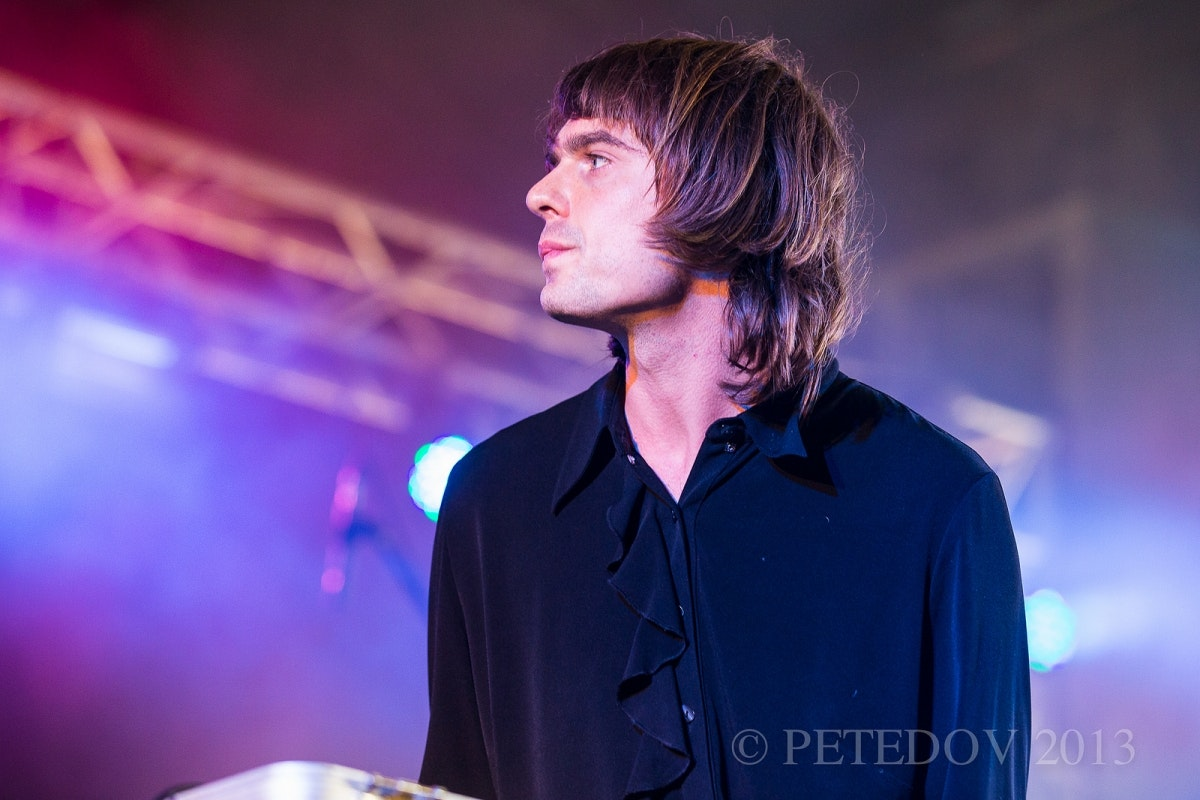
- Deep Sea Arcade lead singer Nic Mckenzie performing at FBi Turns 10 music festival in 2013

Background information
- Origin: Sydney, New South Wales, Australia
- Genres: Neo-psychedelia; indie rock; psychedelic pop; pop rock
- Years active: 2008–present
- Labels: Chugg Music; Speak N Spell; Ivy League Records; Universal Music Australia; Origin Recordings; Warner; ADA
- Members: Nic Mckenzie
- Past members: Nick Weaver

Deep Sea Arcade is an Australian psychedelic band, formed in Sydney, New South Wales in 2008.

The group began as a home recording project of founding members Nic McKenzie (lead singer, songwriter, lyricist) and Nick Weaver (co-composer, bassist, and guitarist) during their mid-teens, using four-track tape recorders, broadcast microphones, analog synths and unconventional computer programs.

Their debut album, Outlands, released worldwide in 2012 through Ivy League Records. The band has played several sold-out tours across venues in Australia, the United Kingdom, and across Europe.

On 26 October 2018, their second album, Blacklight, was released. The album was co-produced and mixed by Grammy award-winning producer Eric J (Flume, The Chemical Brothers), and featured Matt Johnson (Jeff Buckley, St. Vincent) on drums.

Weaver left the band in 2018 and died from cancer in 2021 at the age of 37. In 2022, an album consisting of Weaver's solo compositions was posthumously published, entitled Won’t Let Go.

In 2024, McKenzie announced a vinyl reissue of Outlands through Impressed Recordings, and revealed that a third studio album, featuring and co-produced by Jay Watson (Tame Impala, Pond), is set for release in 2026 through Origin Recordings and Warner ADA.

== Members ==
=== Current members ===
- Nic McKenzie – lead vocals, guitar, synthesizer (2008–present)

=== Former members ===
- Nick Weaver – guitar, bass guitar (2008–2018, died 2021)

=== Former touring members ===
- Mason Lewtas – bass guitar (2016–2018)
- Rob Turner – drums (2016–2018)
- Brendan O' Mahony – synthesizer (2016–2018)
- Mody Grant – guitar (2013–2016)
- James Booker – bass guitar (2013–2016)
- Xavier Diekman – drums (2013–2016)
- Simon Relf – guitar (2010–2013)
- Carlos Adura – drums (2010–2013)
- Tim Chamberlain – guitar (2010–2013)

== Discography ==
=== Albums ===
List of albums, with selected details
Title	Details
Outlands	Released: 16 March, 2012; Format: CD, LP, digital; Label: Ivy League Records (IVY143)
Blacklight	Released: 26 October, 2018; Format: CD, LP, digital; Label: Universal Music Australia (CAT 6781060)

== Performances ==
=== International tours ===
- Blacklight South American Tour (2018)
- Embassy Tour Abu Dhabi (2016)
- Granite City Tour – England, Germany, France, Belgium (2013)
- Outlands Tour – Switzerland, Germany, France, Belgium (2012)
- Girls Tour – England (2011)
- Lonely in Your Arms 7" Tour – Spain, England (2011)

=== National tours ===
- Learning To Fly Tour – October 2016
- Spoon Tour – February 2015
- Black Cat Tour – September 2013
- Granite City Tour – November 2012
- Outlands Album Tour – June 2012
- Girls Single Tour – November 2011
- Co-headline with Surf City – February 2011
