= Native Ryme Syndicate =

Australian hip hop band

Native Ryme (Syndicate)
- Origin: Brisbane, Queensland, Australia
- Genres: Hip hop
- Past members: C-Rock; DK; J Boy; DJ Angus

Native Ryme Syndicate is an Australian hip hop group formed in Brisbane, Queensland. Native Ryme Syndicate won a Deadly award in 1998 for Most Promising New Talent. They were the first Australian urban music group to the elite music festivals and have played with Spiderbait, Regurgitator and 28 Days as well as at the Big Day Out and Livid festivals. Named as one of the best unknown rap/hip-hop music groups in the World by Grammy Award-winning US group Naughty By Nature (Tour 2004). The group are known today as Native Ryme. Native Ryme are releasing their debut full-length album in 2013 after 19 years since formation.

== Discography ==
- Native Ryme Syndicate (2006)
