= ARIA Award for Best Indigenous Release =

Former Australian music award

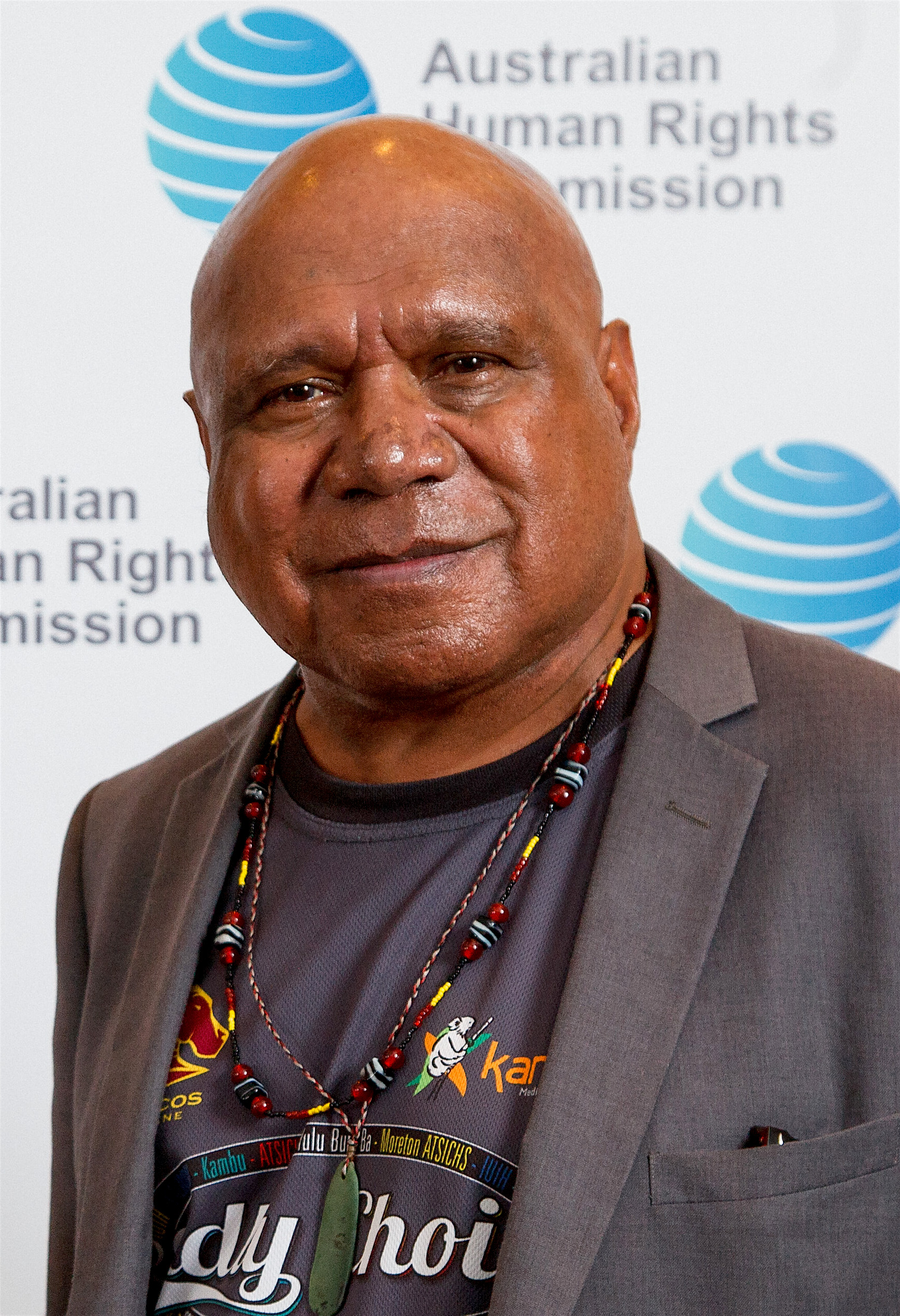
- 1998 winner Archie Roach
- Country: Australia
- Presented by: Australian Recording Industry Association (ARIA)
- First award: 1987
- Final award: 1998
- Currently held by: Archie Roach, Looking for Butter Boy (1998)

Highlights
- Most wins: Archie Roach (3)
- Most nominations: Kev Carmody and Yothu Yindi (6 each)
- Website: ariaawards.com.au

The ARIA Music Award for Best Indigenous Release was an award presented at the annual ARIA Music Awards. It was presented from 1987 through to 1998. Originally titled Best Indigenous Record in 1987, it was renamed Best Aboriginal/Islander Release in 1995. From 1996 it was Best Indigenous Release.

The award for Best Indigenous Release was first presented to Coloured Stone for their album Human Love. It was retired after the 1998 awards with Archie Roach winning the final award for his album Looking for Butter Boy. Roach won the award three times and Weddings Parties Anything, Yothu Yindi and Christine Anu each won it twice, with all except Yothu Yindi winning both their nominations. Kev Carmody and Yothu Yindi were tied for the most nominations with six each, with both additionally contributing to the various artists album Our Home, Our Land, though Carmody never won. In 1988, upon Midnight Oil's nomination for Best Indigenous Record, their manager Gary Morris objected to the group being put in that category by ARIA, saying "an Indigenous Award should go to an indigenous band."

== Winners and nominees ==
In the following table, the winner is highlighted in a separate colour, and in boldface; the nominees are those that are not highlighted or in boldface.

Winner marked in a separate colour

Year	Winner(s)	Album title
**1987** (1st)
**1987** (1st)	**Coloured Stone**	**Human Love**
**1987** (1st)	Dave de Hugard	The Magpie in the Wattle
**1987** (1st)	John Williamson	Mallee Boy
**1987** (1st)	Sirocco	Voyage
**1987** (1st)	The Three Chord Wonders	Try Change
**1988** (2nd)
**1988** (2nd)	**Gondwanaland**	**Gondwanaland**
**1988** (2nd)	Australia All Over	Australia All Over
**1988** (2nd)	Flying Emus	This Town
**1988** (2nd)	Midnight Oil	Diesel and Dust
**1988** (2nd)	Warumpi Band	Go Bush
**1989** (3rd)
**1989** (3rd)	**Weddings Parties Anything**	**Roaring Days**
**1989** (3rd)	Kev Carmody	Pillars of Society
**1989** (3rd)	Flying Emus	"This Town" / "Darling Street"
**1989** (3rd)	Midnight Oil	"Dreamworld"
**1989** (3rd)	Dave Steel	"The Hardest Part"
**1990** (4th)
**1990** (4th)	**Weddings Parties Anything**	**The Big Don't Argue**
**1990** (4th)	Coloured Stone	Wild Desert Rose
**1990** (4th)	Gondwanaland	Wildlife
**1990** (4th)	Scrap Metal	Broken Down Man
**1990** (4th)	Yothu Yindi	Homeland Movement
**1991** (5th)
**1991** (5th)	**Archie Roach**	**Charcoal Lane**
**1991** (5th)	Coloured Stone	Crazy Mind
**1991** (5th)	Various Artists	Australia All Over Macca's No. 4
**1991** (5th)	Various Artists	From the Bush
**1991** (5th)	Wild Pumpkins At Midnight	Little Victories
**1992** (6th)
**1992** (6th)	**Yothu Yindi**	**Tribal Voice**
**1992** (6th)	Archie Roach	"Down City Streets"
**1992** (6th)	Kev Carmody	"Eulogy (For a Black Person)"
**1992** (6th)	Shane Howard	"Escape from Reality"
**1992** (6th)	Not Drowning, Waving & The Musicians of Rabaul, Papua New Guinea featuring George Telek	Tabaran
**1993** (7th)
**1993** (7th)	**Yothu Yindi**	**"Djäpana (Sunset Dreaming)"**
**1993** (7th)	Kev Carmody	Street Beat
**1993** (7th)	Coloured Stone	Inma Juju
**1993** (7th)	Gondwanaland	Wide Skies
**1993** (7th)	Tiddas	Inside My Kitchen
**1994** (8th)
**1994** (8th)	**Tiddas**	**Sing About Life**
**1994** (8th)	Kev Carmody	Bloodlines
**1994** (8th)	Not Drowning, Waving	Circus
**1994** (8th)	Archie Roach	Jamu Dreaming
**1994** (8th)	Yothu Yindi	Freedom
**1995** (9th)
**1995** (9th)	**Christine Anu**	**Stylin' Up**
**1995** (9th)	Kev Carmody	"On the Wire"
**1995** (9th)	Ruby Hunter	Thoughts Within
**1995** (9th)	Tiddas	"Changing Times"
**1995** (9th)	Yothu Yindi & Neil Finn	"Dots on the Shells"
**1996** (10th)
**1996** (10th)	**Christine Anu**	**"Come On"**
**1996** (10th)	Kev Carmody	Images and Illusions
**1996** (10th)	Blekbala Mujik	Blekbala Mujik
**1996** (10th)	Various Artists	Our Home, Our Land
**1996** (10th)	Warumpi Band	Too Much Humbug
**1997** (11th)
**1997** (11th)	**Archie Roach**	**Hold On Tight**
**1997** (11th)	George Telek	Telek
**1997** (11th)	Tiddas	Tiddas
**1997** (11th)	Warumpi Band	Stompin' Ground
**1997** (11th)	Yothu Yindi	Birrkuta - Wild Honey
**1998** (12th)
**1998** (12th)	**Archie Roach**	**Looking for Butter Boy**
**1998** (12th)	Gondwana	Xenophon
**1998** (12th)	Singers for the Red Black and Gold	"Yil Lull"
**1998** (12th)	John Williamson & Warren H Williams	"Raining on the Rock"
**1998** (12th)	Bart Willoughby	Pathways

== Artists with multiple wins ==
3 wins

- Archie Roach

2 wins

- Christine Anu
- Weddings Parties Anything
- Yothu Yindi

== Artists with multiple nominations ==
7 nominations

- Kev Carmody (Note: Including the various artists album Our Home, Our Land.)
- Archie Roach (Note: Including the various artists album Our Home, Our Land and "Yil Lull" by the supergroup Singers For The Red Black & Gold.)
- Yothu Yindi

6 nominations

- Tiddas

5 nominations

- Coloured Stone

4 nominations

- Christine Anu
- Gondwanaland
- Warumpi Band

3 nominations

- David Bridie (Note: Including two as a member of Not Drowning, Waving and the various artists album Our Home, Our Land.)
- Blekbala Mujik (Note: Including the various artists albums From the Bush and Our Home, Our Land.)

2 nominations

- Flying Emus
- Shane Howard
- Ruby Hunter
- Paul Kelly
- Midnight Oil
- Not Drowning, Waving
- Dave Steel (Note: Including one as a member of Weddings Parties Anything in 1989.)
- George Telek
- Weddings Parties Anything
- John Williamson
- Bart Willoughby
