= Our Home, Our Land =

Compilation album
- Released: 1995
- Label: CAAMA

Our Home, Our Land is a compilation album released in Australia by CAAMA in 1995. It was released to celebrate the victory in the Mabo case. It focused on the importance of land to the Aboriginal and Torres Strait Islander beliefs. It was nominated for a 1996 ARIA Award for Best Indigenous Release.

The CDs featured a mix of new and established artists. The title track was commissioned for this release. Previously recorded tracks were licensed from well known artist and some new tracks were recorded for this album. The new tracks were winners of a song contest for artist that had not been previously recorded.

The album received positive reviews. Jarrod Watt writing in the Age noted that it was "a pretty decent snapshot of the directions indigenous musicians are taking off to while keeping the traditions of the past." Sunday Age's Larry Schwartz states " It is a rich mix of talent that will delight enthusiasts."

In 2000 an illustrated book by Stephen Lalor called Our home, our land : contemporary Aboriginal music education kit was released as a resource about the cds for secondary schools.

== Accolades ==
Year	Award	Nomination	Result
1996	ARIA Music Awards	Best Indigenous Release	Nominated

== Track listing ==
1. Our Home, Our Land – Various
2. Mabo – Yothu Yindi
3. Land Rights – Sunrize Band
4. Forgotten Tribe – Coloured Stone
5. Kulha Vaday – Christine Anu
6. Solid Rock – Shane Howard
7. Respect for Eddie Mabo – Rygela Band
8. Stricken Land – Blackfire
9. Angerwuy – Raven
10. Our Home, Our Land (instrumental)
11. Nitmiluk – Blekbala Mujik
12. We Shall Cry – Warumpi Band
13. This Land's Worth More than Gold and Silver – Phil Moncrieff
14. Yolngu – Frances Williams
15. Climbing that mountain – Amunda (with Rachel Perkins)
16. From Little Things Big Things Grow – Paul Kelly and Kev Carmody with Tiddas
17. A Little Drop – Minnie Read
18. Big Mountain Wilpena Pound – Artoowarapana Band
19. Original Aboriginal – Dave Quinlan
20. Tjapwurrung country – Neil Murray
21. Koiki, Father Dave and James – Peter Yanada McKenzie
22. Mabo – Mills Sisters
23. Nakkanya – Paul Kelly
24. Our home, our land (Language version) – Buna Lawrie

Artist appearing on the first track are Lou Bennett, Sally Dastey, Amy Saunders (all from Tiddas), Kev Carmody, Archie Roach, Ruby Hunter, Bart Willoughby, Buna Lawrie, Sammy Butcher, Shane Howard and David Bridie.
