= Gondwanaland (Australian band) =

- Also known as: Gondwanaland Project, Gondwana, Charlie McMahon and Gondwana
- Origin: Sydney, New South Wales, Australia
- Genres: Progressive electronic; world; ambient
- Years active: 1981–1992, 1994–present
- Labels: Hot, Powderworks, WEA, Log/Shock
- Past members: Peter Carolan; Charlie McMahon; Eddie Duquemin

Gondwanaland, originally billed as Gondwanaland Project, were an Australian musical ensemble which combined the indigenous Australian instrument the didgeridoo with western instruments such as synthesiser and guitar.

In 1981 Gondwanaland Project was formed by Peter Carolan on synthesiser and Charlie McMahon on didgeridoo and vocals. After releasing the lp Terra Incognita (1984) the duo were joined full-time by percussionist Eddy Duquemin and the group name was shortened to Gondwanaland. Four albums were released under this title Let the Dog Out (1986), Gondwanaland (1987), Wildlife (1989) and Wide Skies (1992).

In 1994 McMahon formed a variable line-up band called Gondwana or Charlie McMahon and Gondwana releasing albums Travelling (1994), Xenophon (1998), Bone Man (2002), and Didj Heart (2012).

Peter Carolan released three solo albums Windswept (1994),Tides (1999),Overland (2006).

Ed Duquemin released a solo album Crossculture in 2002.

At the ARIA Music Awards of 1988 Gondwanaland won the 'Best Indigenous Release' category, Wide Skies and Xenophon, were each nominated in the same category in 1993 and 1998, respectively.

== History ==
Sydney musician Charlie McMahon formed Gondwanaland Project to combine his love for the Australian outback with his didgeridoo playing and he was one of the first musicians to unite western and traditional indigenous music into the genre of ambient, world music. To achieve the sound for McMahon's desert tunes, he joined up with synthesiser player, Peter Carolan, in 1981. Gondwana is a continental landmass of the prehistoric Mesozoic era which included Antarctica, South America, Africa, India and Australia. McMahon learned didgeridoo as a teenager and improved his technique while working in Central Australia.

In 1983 Gondwanaland issued a self-financed six-track cassette, Didgeridu-Synth. In 1984 Carolan and McMahon were assisted in the studio by various musicians: Rob Hirst (Midnight Oil) on percussion, Andrew De Teliga on guitar and violin, and Rob Schad on didgeridoo. They recorded the first Gondwanaland album, Terra Incognita, which was released on the small independent Hot Records label, together with a single, "Danger", in May.

In May 1985 the group advertised for a drummer, "Gondwana Wana Drummer", and received only one response from an energetic multi-format percussionist, Eddy Duquemin. With Duquemin joining Gondwanaland, McMahon decided to make the group his full-time occupation. In November that year, the group supported Midnight Oil on a 26-date national tour starting in Dubbo. In 1986 Gondwanaland's second album, Let the Dog Out, was issued by Midnight Oil's Powderworks label. It contained a bracket of aggressive, up-tempo numbers followed by two extended compositions, the first of which, "Ephemeral Lakes", later became a regular choice for meditative ambient music compilations. The group spent a year of extensive live work in Sydney and then a four-week tour of the Northern Territory.

In 1987 the band signed with WEA, which released their third album, Gondwanaland. It had taken many months to record and while the prolonged touring helped tighten the arrangements some of the groups intense live energy was diluted by the usual studio technique of making a separate recording of each member's instrumental part before a final mix. At the ARIA Music Awards of 1988 Gondwanaland won the 'Best Indigenous Release' category. One track, "Landmark", featured the first use of McMahon's invention, the multi-tone, slide didgeridoo he dubbed a 'didjeribone'.

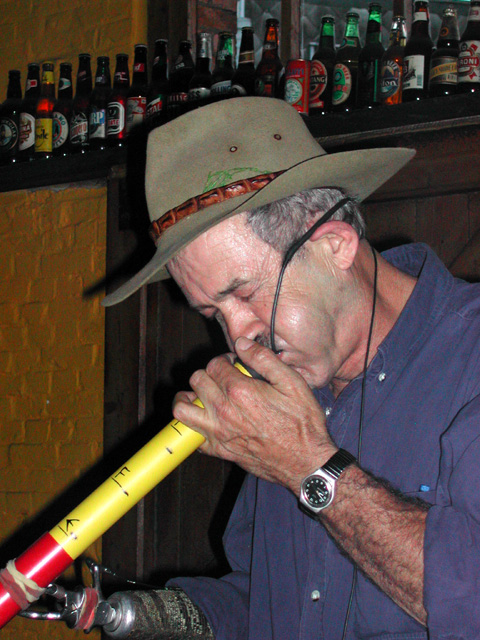
Charlie McMahon of Gondwana playing his invention, a 'didjeribone'. He is using a mouth-held geologist's seismic sensor to amplify its growling subsonic dynamics. Sfinks Festival in Boechout, Belgium, in 2002

In November 1988 Gondwanaland performed at the Tomita Sound Cloud in Sydney – Hymn to Mankind, a AUD $3 million, Japanese government-sponsored, light and sound, opera spectacular held on Sydney Harbour as part of the Australian Bicentennial celebrations. The concert attracted an audience of over 120,000: an Australian record for a live music event. Gondwanaland's fourth album, Wildlife, which was released in 1989, was a live recording in a Sydney nightclub, Kakadu. The group "achieved its strongest combination of ambient and avant-garde experimentation on [this album], with tracks like 'Highway' and 'Deja Vu' evoking the vastness and loneliness of Central Australia".

Gondwanaland's next album, Wide Skies (1992) came after touring northern Australia and includes guest performances by Bobby Bunuggurr, Cleis Pierce, Maroochy Barambah, Andrew de Teliga (Sirocco), Blair Greenberg, Pee Wee Ferris and Carl Zhang. It was produced by Martin Armiger, recorded from 1990 to 1992 in both Sydney and the Northern Territory, and was released by WEA. Gone were the earthy good time romps and quiet moments of reflection, now complex panoramic chord clusters enveloped the arrangements in an almost overwhelming evocation of the sky and all that happens in and under it. This album's multi-layered textures and moods earned the band even greater critical respect. Wide Skies was nominated at the ARIA Music Awards of 1993 for 'Best Indigenous Release'.

By 1994 McMahon formed another band, Gondwana, with an emphasis on rhythm and increasingly dominant bass and experimental didgeridoo sounds. This group released three albums: Travelling (1994), Xenophon (1998), and Bone Man (2002). The latter two albums feature another McMahon innovation: the mouth-held use of a geologist's seismic sensor to amplify the growling subsonic didgeridoo dynamics. This gave McMahon a new audience: the trance, dance crowd. Xenophon was nominated at the ARIA Music Awards of 1998 for 'Best Indigenous Release'.

Gondwanaland composer/arranger Peter Carolan [64] died on 28 July 2012 from a respiratory illness.

In 2012 Charlie McMahon and Gondwana released album Didj Heart

== Members ==
- Charlie McMahon – didgeridoo, vocals, didjeribone (1981–1992, 1994–present)
- Peter Carolan – synthesiser (1981–1992)
- Eddie Duquemin – drums, percussion (1986–1992)

== Discography ==
=== Studio albums ===
List of albums, with Australian chart positions
Title	Album details	Peak chart positions
Title	Album details	AUS
Credited as Gondwanaland
Terra Incognita	Released: 1984; Format: LP, cassette; Label: Powderworks (POW 6113)	–
Let the Dog Out	Released: 1985; Format: LP, cassette; Label: Powderworks (POW 6112)	–
Gondwanaland	Released: 1987; Format: LP, cassette, CD; Label: WEA (255135–2)	93
Wildlife	Released: November 1990; Format: LP, cassette, CD; Label: WEA (256415–2)	70
Wide Skies	Released: 1992; Format: CD; Label: EastWest Records (903177465.2)	-
Big Land	Released: 1993; Format: CD; Label: Log Music (LOG1)	-
Credited as Gondwana
Traveling	Released: 1994; Format: CD; Label: Log Music (4797382)	-
Xenophon	Released: 1998; Format: CD; Label: Log Music (LOG 27D)	-
Bone Man	Released: 2002; Format: CD; Label: Log Music (LOG 28D)	-
Didj Heart (with Charlie McMahon)	Released: 2012; Format: CD, download; Label: Log Music (LOG 29D)	-

=== Compilation albums ===
Title	Album details
Over Gondwanaland (as Gondwanaland)	Released: 2000; Format: CD; Label: Latisphere (LAT1001)
Spirit of Gondwana (as Gondwana)	Released: 2000; Format: CD; Label: Latisphere (LAT1002)

== Awards and nominations ==
=== ARIA Music Awards ===
The ARIA Music Awards is an annual award ceremony event celebrating the Australian music industry.

Year	Nominee / work	Award	Result
1988	Gondwanaland	Best Indigenous Release	Won
1990	Wildlife	Best Indigenous Release	Nominated
1993	Wide Skies	Best Indigenous Release	Nominated
1998	Xenophon	Best Indigenous Release	Nominated
