= Deadly Awards 1996 =

Annual Australian music awards

The 1996 Deadly Awards were hosted by Rhoda Roberts at the Metro Theatre in Sydney on 1 October 1996. Presenters included Nicky Winmar, Toni Janke, Warren Fahey and Triple J's Chris Thompson. The awards were an annual celebration of Australian Aboriginal and Torres Strait Islander achievement in music, sport, entertainment and community.

== Winners ==
- Outstanding Contribution to Aboriginal Music: Warumpi Band
- Single Release of the Year: Maroochy Barambah - "Mongungi"
- Album Release of the Year: Blekbala Mujik – Blekbala Mujik
- Male Artist of the Year: Kev Carmody
- Female Artist of the Year: Christine Anu
- Band of the Year: Tiddas
- Excellence in Film or Theatre Score - Alchemy - David Page
- Most Promising New Talent: Wild Water
- Community Broadcaster: Roxy Musk (Top FM)
