= Coloured Stone =

Aboriginal Australian music band

- Origin: Koonibba, South Australia, Australia
- Genres: Aboriginal rock, ska, reggae, funk
- Years active: 1977–present
- Labels: CAAMA, RCA/BMG
- Members: Bunna Lawrie and guest musicians
- Past members: Selwyn Burns; Cee Cee Honey Bee; Tjimba Possum-Burns; Russell "Rusty" Pinky; Duane Lawrie; Neil Coaby; Mackie Coaby; Bart Willoughby; Jason Scott; Bruce "Bunny" Mundy; John John Miller; Joseph Williams; Ash Dargan; Robby Fletcher; Jojo Coleman; Corey Noll; Nicky Moffat; Lionel Sarmardin

Coloured Stone are an Aboriginal Australian band whose members originate from the Koonibba Mission, west of Ceduna, South Australia. They first became known for their 1984 single, "Black Boy". The band performs using guitar, bass, drums, and Aboriginal instruments – didjeridu, bundawuthada (gong stone) and clap sticks – to play traditional music.

== Background and members ==
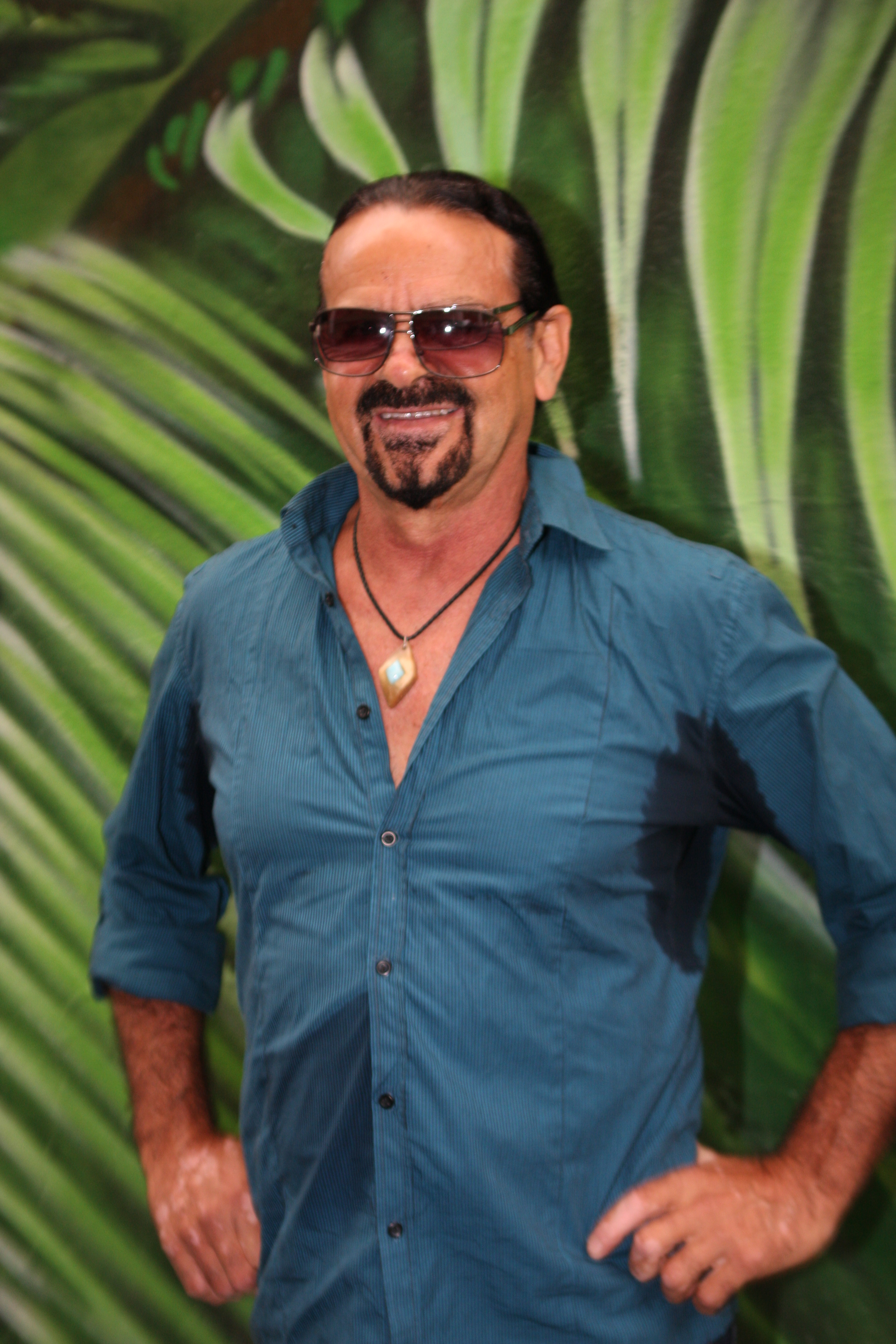
Bunna Lawrie in February 2012

The original Coloured Stone band members were three brothers, Bunna Lawrie (drums, lead vocals, songwriter), and Neil Coaby (rhythm guitar and backing vocals) and Mackie Coaby (bass guitar and backing vocals), and their nephew, Bruce (a.k.a. Bunny) Mundy (lead guitar and backing vocals). All are from the community of Koonibba, South Australia.

Lawrie is a member and respected elder of the Mirning people coastal Nullarbor region in South Australia. He is known as a whale-dreamer, songman, medicine man and storyteller. He is Coloured Stone's founding member and chief songwriter.

The band's single, "Black Boy" was a success when first released in 1984. It became the number one song in Fiji, and sold 120,000 copies. The lyrics included the line "Black boy, black boy, the colour of your skin is your pride and joy", which was a somewhat revolutionary sentiment for Aboriginal people in the 1980s. Four decades after its release, the single still inspires hope and inspiration for generations of Aboriginal people. The song was used in Warwick Thornton's 2021/2 vampire TV series, Firebite.

Lawrie's son, Jason Scott, played guitar, bass, drums and didgeridoo for Coloured Stone from the age of 13 years. His first major gig was "Rock Against Racism" in Adelaide. Scott has also performed at the Sydney Opera House and he toured the US in 1994 with the Wirrangu Band as part of a cultural exchange program. With his band Desert Sea, Scott released an album in 2002 titled From the Desert to the Sea.

The current members of Coloured Stone are: Lawrie (vocals, rhythm guitar, didgeridoo, gong stone), Selwyn Burns (lead guitar, vocals), Peter Hood (drums), Cee Cee Honeybee (backing vocals) and guest musicians (bass guitarist, didgeridoo player, keyboard player.

== Support for Aboriginal causes ==
On the first day of an April 1998 outdoor gig, Wild Water opened for Coloured Stone and Regurgitator at Brown's Mart Community Arts Centre. On the third day the band went to Jabiru, Northern Territory, to play at the Sports and Social Club. At dawn on day four, Coloured Stone travelled to Jabiluka to play on a makeshift stage in support of the Mirrar people's protest blockade of the road to a uranium mine on Mirrar land.

From March to August 2001, Lawrie and fellow Aboriginal musician Barry Cedric took part in a songwriting workshop for Aboriginal youth at Yarrabah. The young people learned to play musical instruments, compose a song and set it to music. At the end, six youths went to Cairns to record their song, "One Fire", in a recording studio.

Four of Coloured Stone's songs have been recognised as important resources for Australian teachers and educators to employ when discussing topics such as reconciliation, and Aboriginal and Torres Strait Islander cultures, contributions and histories. These pieces include, Island of Greed, No more boomerang (based on Oodgeroo Noonuccal's poem of the same name), Black Boy and Human Love.

== In the media ==
"A Rare Gem: Coloured Stone" is an episode of 2013 TV series Desperate Measures, which features the band.

== Discography ==
=== Albums ===
Title	Details
Koonibba Rock	Released: 1984; Label: Imparja Records (IMLP 1001); Format: Vinyl
Island of Greed	Released: 1985; Label: Imparja Records (IMLP 1002); Format: Vinyl
Human Love	Released: 1986; Label: Powderworks (POW6122); Format: Vinyl
Wild Desert Rose	Released: 1988; Label: RCA Victor (VPL10714); Format: Vinyl
Crazy Mind	Released: 1990; Label: RCA Victor (VPCD0821); Format: CD
Inma Juju Dance Music	Released: 1991; Label: BMG (VPCD0847); Format: CD
Rhythm of Nature	Released: 1998; Label: CAAMA Music (M306); Format: CD
I Dance to the Sun	Released: 2013; Label: Coloured Stone; Format: DD

==== Compilation albums ====
Title	Details
Black Rock from the Red Centre	Released: 1986; Label: Powderworks (POW6123); Format: Vinyl, CD; Compilation of Koonibba Rock & Island of Greed
Bunna Lawrie's Best of Coloured Stone	Released: 1997; Label: CAAMA Music (CAMMA 313); Format: CD
Bunna Lawrie's Best Of Coloured Stone	Released: 1997; Label: CAAMA Music (CAMMA 313); Format: CD

=== Singles ===
Year	Title	Album
1978	"Dancing in the Moonlight"	
1984	"Black Boy"	Koonibba Rock
1985	"Island of Greed"	Island of Greed
1987	"Dancing in the Moonlight"	Human Love
1987	"Human Love"	Human Love
1988	"Stay Young"	Wild Desert Rose
1988	"Kiss the Days Goodbye" / "Dreamtime Stories"	Wild Desert Rose
1988	"Wild Desert Rose"	Wild Desert Rose
1989	"Crazy Minds"	Crazy Mind
1992	"Love is the Medicine"	Inma Juju Dance Music
2000	"Australia"	non album single
2011	"Black Boy" (featuring Yung Warriors)	non album single

== Awards and recognition ==
- 1978: Perth's 3rd National Aboriginal Country Music Festival Talent (Western Australia) – First Prize for Best Band
- 1978: Perth's 3rd National Aboriginal Country Music Festival Talent – Best Original Song for "Dancing in the Moonlight"
- 1995: Brian Syron Scholarship Award (Australia) – Contribution to Aboriginal music
- 2012: National NAIDOC Lifetime Achievement Award (Australia) to Bunna Lawrie

=== ARIA Music Awards ===
The ARIA Music Awards is an annual awards ceremony that recognises excellence, innovation, and achievement across all genres of Australian music. Coloured Stone has one ARIA Award and been nominated for three, as follows:

Year	Nominee / work	Award	Result
1987	Human Love	Best Indigenous Release	Won
1989	Wild Desert Rose	Best Cover Art	Nominated
1990	Crazy Mind	Best Indigenous Release	Nominated
1993	Inma Juju	Best Indigenous Release	Nominated

=== Deadly Awards ===
The Deadly Awards, (commonly known simply as The Deadlys), was an annual celebration of Australian Aboriginal and Torres Strait Islander achievement in music, sport, entertainment and community. It ran from 1995 to 2013

Year	Nominee / work	Award	Result
1999	Coloured Stone	Outstanding Contribution to Aboriginal Music	awarded

=== Don Banks Music Award ===
The Don Banks Music Award was established in 1984 to publicly honour a senior artist of high distinction who has made an outstanding and sustained contribution to music in Australia. It was founded by the Australia Council in honour of Don Banks, Australian composer, performer and the first chair of its music board.

Year	Nominee / work	Award	Result
2000	Bunna Lawrie	Don Banks Music Award	awarded

=== Music Victoria Awards ===
The Music Victoria Awards are an annual awards night celebrating Victorian music. They commenced in 2006.

Year	Nominee / work	Award	Result	Ref.
2014	Dance to the Sun	Best Global or Reggae Album	Nominated	

=== National Indigenous Music Awards ===
The National Indigenous Music Awards recognise excellence, innovation and leadership among Aboriginal and Torres Strait Islander musicians from throughout Australia. It commenced in 2004.

Year	Nominee / work	Award	Result
2011	Coloured Stone	Hall of Fame	inducted

=== South Australian Music ===
Year	Nominee / work	Award	Result
2024	Coloured Stone	Hall of Fame	awarded
