= Warren Fahey =

Australian cultural historian and performer

Warren Fahey (AM)
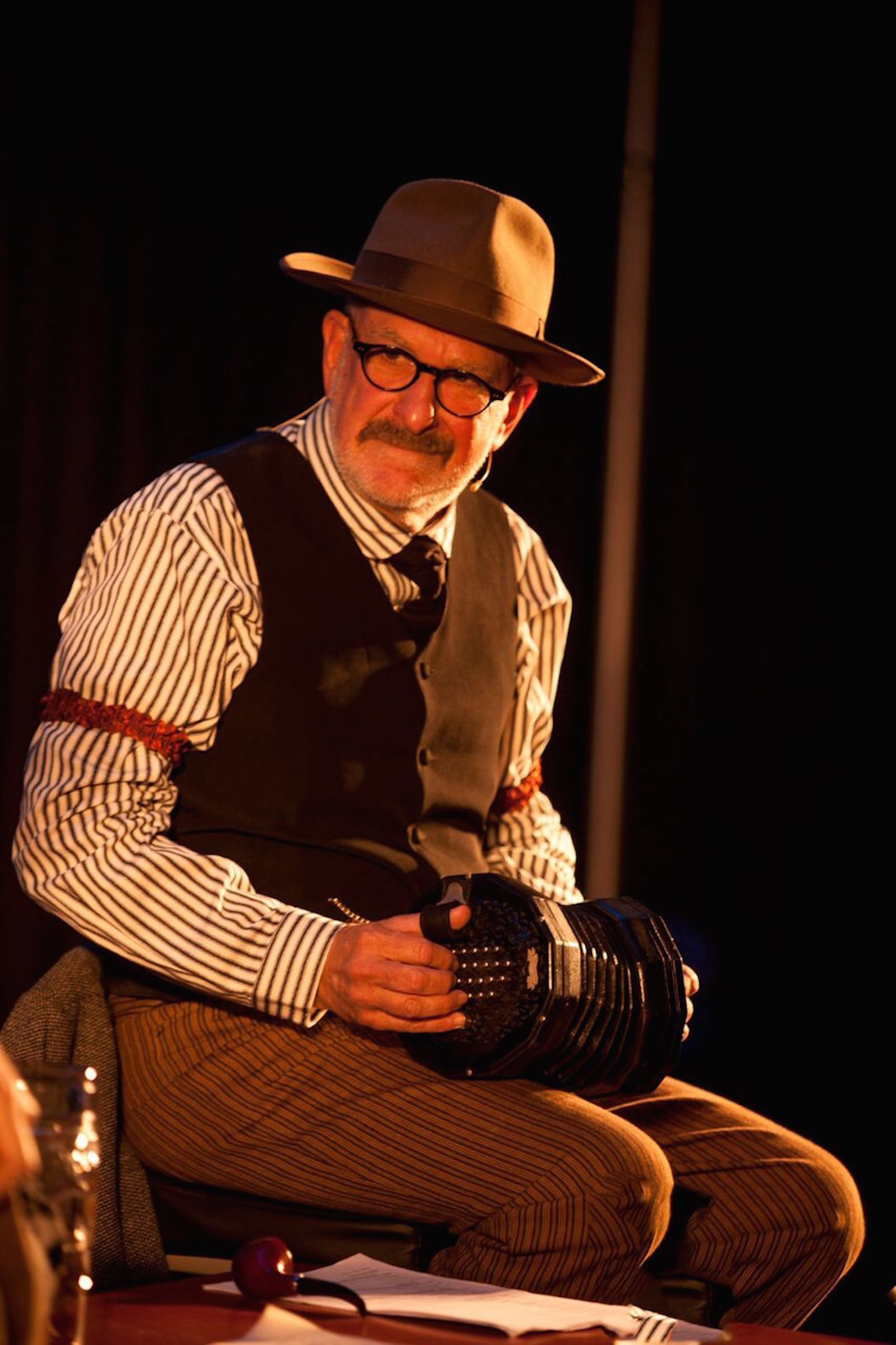
- Warren as Banjo Paterson. 2014
- Born: Warren John Fahey; 3 January 1946 (age 80); Sydney, Australia
- Occupations: Folklorist and cultural historian; singer-songwriter; author; actor; artist; record and concert producer
- Musical career
- Genre: Folklore
- Years active: 1969
- Labels: EMI Records, ABC Records, Larrikin Records, Bodgie Records, Undercover Records, Rouseabout Records
- Awards: Centenary Medal, Don Banks Music Award

Warren John Fahey AM (born 3 January 1946) is an Australian folklore collector, cultural historian, author, actor, broadcaster, record and concert producer, visual artist, songwriter, and performer of Australian traditional and related historical music. He is the founder of Folkways Music (1973), Larrikin Records (1974) and a folk music ensemble, the Larrikins (1975).

Fahey has had a long association with ABC Radio, and has received numerous awards for his folklore efforts, including the 2010 Don Banks Music Award.

== Early life ==
Warren John Fahey was born on 3 January 1946 and grew up in Sydney. His father, George Fahey, and mother, Deborah (née Solomon), were each members of large families. Fahey attended Marist Brothers College, Kogarah.

== Career ==
Fahey has a distinguished career as a folklorist and collector of oral histories. His collection has been housed in the National Library of Australia since 1973.

As a performer he tells Australian folk stories, recites bush poetry, and sings either solo or with The Larrikins, The Celebrated Knickers & Knockers Band, and the Australian Bush Orchestra. Lahey started performing in 1969 and has a repertoire of bush songs, early ballads, city ditties and associated folklore including poetry, drinking toasts and parodies. He presents entertainment programs based on his books at various Writers Week festivals as well as performances at folk and regional arts festivals. He plays an English Edeophone concertina.

=== Folklore unit and Folkways Music ===
In 1970, Fahey began a folklore unit in Sydney, where he collects material of cultural significance. His Australian folklore unit has been collecting and annotating Australian folklore for nearly 50 years and made available in his books, radio programs, concerts and, on his website. In 1973, he established Folkways Music as a "retail music outlet specialising in folkloric recordings and publications." The store supplied "records, books, sheet music and instruments" and commenced "as a means to financing its proprietor's collecting activities. It received no government assistance, and for its first year was subsidised by advertising work."

=== Larrikin records ===
Fahey founded Larrikin Records in 1974 "to publish and commercially release extended play recordings featuring Australian traditional folk music and songs for both educational and entertainment purposes." The label's first album, Man of the Earth: Songs and Ballads of the Australian Mining Industry (1975), produced by Lahey, credited Fahey on lead vocals; Dave de Hugard on concertina, button accordion and fiddle; Phyl Lobl on guitar, Mike Jackson on mouth organ and spoons; Andy Saunders on 5-string banjo and guitar; and Tony Suttor on accordion. Fahey also produced the album. By 1995, the record company was one of the largest independent distributors in Australia, and was acquired by Festival Records.

Larrikin Music, a publishing company Fahey sold in 1988 owns the rights to the well-known children's "Kookaburra song". In a high-profile case that began in 2009, Norm Lurie, then the managing director of Music Sales, Larrikin Music's parent company, sued the group Men at Work for using its melody in five bars of their 93-bar song "Down Under". After the Down Under court case, Fahey, who had nothing to do with the court case, suggested that the copyright owners of the Kookaburra, Larrikin Music, 'gift' the song to Australia.

=== The Larrikins ===
In 1971 Fahey formed a folk music ensemble, the Larrikins. In April 1975 the Larrikins undertook a tour of north-western Australia, to perform "folk-army songs, bush songs, bush poetry and yarns, bush dance music." The band issued an album, Limejuice and Vinegar (1977), with the line-up of Fahey and Suttor (on button accordion and Anglo concertina) joined by Ned Alexander on fiddle; Liora Claff on guitar and whistle; Jack Fallis on mandolin and guitar; and Paddy McLaughlin on banjo. It was re-released in 1985, with the content described as "Traditional Australian seamen's and boatmen's songs". The Larrikins toured for Musica Viva and the Arts Council circuit for the past 40 years.

=== Other appearances ===
Fahey has performed at the National Folk Festival (2001, 2004, 2006, 2007, 2009), Majors Creek Music Festival (twice), Victor Harbour Festival, Araluen Folk Festival WA and, in 2009, The Blue Mountains Festival, National Folk Festival and Cobargo Festival. In 2001, he hosted and performed at the Belongings Exhibition for the State Library of NSW for the Governor-General, and then at the re-opening of the Mitchell Library with a performance for the Governor of NSW and the Premier.

In 2006, he performed a song cycle world premiere performance of Andrew Ford's "Barleycorn" for the Brisbane Festival. Lahey was artistic director of the ten-day Australian Spotlight, Lorient Festival, Brittany, France, on behalf of the Australian Government.

Fahey is a regular broadcaster on ABC Radio.

=== Art, film, and acting ===
In 2010, Fahey devised, scripted, recorded and co-produced (with visual artist Mic Gruchy) a major multi-screen art installation commissioned by the Biennale of Sydney titled Damned Souls and Turning Wheels, a history of Cockatoo Island. In 2012, he was Artistic Producer for the Kings Cross Festival. 2014 saw Lahey return to collaborating with video artist Mic Gruchy to devise and create a series of films on the history of Rookwood Cemetery for the Rookwood Trust.

In 2015, Fahey and Max Cullen co-wrote and performed the two-hand stage play Dead Men Talking, Cullen playing Henry Lawson and Warren Fahey portrayed Banjo Paterson. The first tour covered the mid-NSW coast in a twelve-night tour. Since March 2015 through to May 2016, the play was performed nearly 250 times, including successful tours in NSW, Tasmania, ACT and Victoria. The actors toured west New South Wales and Victoria in 2019.

In January 2016, Fahey presented three sold-out shows of 40 Ways To Love Your City celebrating the 40th anniversary of the Sydney Festival. These shows were staged in the Famous Spiegel Tent in Sydney's Hyde Park. In August 2019, he was artistic director for the Sydney Folk Festival, a three-day event staged in Sydney Central with over 150 performers.

== Discography ==
=== Albums ===
List of albums
| Title | Album details |
|---|---|
| Man of the Earth (with various artists) | Released: 1975; Label: Larrikin Records (Larrikin 001); Formats: LP |
| Lime Juice & Vinegar (with the Larrikins) | Released: 1977; Label: EMI (EMC 2574); Formats: LP |
| The Larrikin Sessions (with Dave de Hugard, Bob McInnes and Andy Saunders) | Released: 1993; Label: ABC Music (518202-2); Formats: CD |
| A Panorama of Bush Songs | Released: 2004; Label: ABC Music (13942); Formats: CD |
| Larrikins, Louts and Layabouts | Released: 2004; Label: ABC Music (13952); Formats: CD |
| Australia: Folk Songs & Bush Verse | Released: 2009; Label: ABC Music (1798174); Formats: CD |
| Rare Convict Ballads and Broadsides | Released: April 2010; Label: Bodgie Productions; Formats: Digital |
| Give Me a Hut on My Native Land: Colonial Settlers | Released: April 2010; Label: Bodgie Productions; Formats: Digital |
| Warren Fahey's Australian Bush Orchestra | Released: 2012; Label: ABC Music (2794887); Formats: CD |
| The World Turned Upside-Down (with Garry Steel) | Released: 2014; Label: Rouseabout Records (RRR63); Formats: CD |
| Dead Men Talking (with Max Cullen) | Released: April 2015; Label: Undercover Music; Formats: Digital |
| Diggers (Songs of Australians at War) (with Mic Conway) | Released: April 2015; Label: Undercover Music; Formats: Digital |

== Selected publications ==
- All at Sea – Australian Maritime Traditions, Bodgie Books. ebook 2017
- The Good Old Bad Old Days – a curious history of Woolloomooloo, Potts Point, Kings Cross, Elizabeth & Rushcutters Bay, Bodgie Books 2017"
- The World Turned Upside-down – a history of the Australian Gold Rush, Bodgie Books
- Australia: Its Folksongs & Bush Verse, ABC Books
- Australia: Its Folksongs & Bush Ballads, ABC/HarperCollins
- Sing Us Anothery Dirty As Buggery. – Australian bawdry, Bodgie Books
- Manar: a Potts Point local history, Bodgie Books
- Old Bush Songs – the centenary edition (with Graham Seal), ABC
- Classic Bush Yarns, HarperCollins
- Great Aussie Yarns, A&R
- The Big Fat Book of Aussie Jokes: Australian humour at work in the 21st Century, HarperCollins
- Ratbags & Rabblerousers – Australian political parody and satire in the 20th century, Currency Press
- Diggers' Songs – the songs Australian diggers sang in eleven wars from the Maori Wars to the Gulf War, Australian Military History Press
- When Mabel Laid The Table – the folklore of eating and drinking in Australia from colonial days to takeaways, ABC
- The Balls of Bob Menzies – Australian political folklore from Federation onwards, A&R
- The Songs That Made Australia – 107 bush songs, A&R
- Australian Folksong Guide – the bush band, CBC
- Eureka. – the social history of Australia as seen through song, Ominbus
- Pint Pot & Billy. A selection of Australian songs, William Collins
- Joe Watson – his life and times, Folklore Associates
- While The Billy Boils, ABC
- Folklore of the Australian Wedding, Bodgie Books
- While The Billy Boils. Australian history (with accompanying 16 tape set), ABC
- Tucker Track: the curious history of Australian food, ABC
- Oxford Companion to Australian Folklore, Oxford University Press
- The Stockman, Kevin Weldon Publishing
- The Companion to Australian Music, Currency Press
- Missing in Action, MUP
- Australian Almanac 1989/1991/1992, Angus & Robertson/HC
- Verandah Music, Curtin University
- Folklore Essays (edited Graham Seal/Jennifer Gall) 2010 Curtin University Press

== Awards and nominations ==
- In 1997, Member of the Order of Australia, "In recognition of service to Australian music and Australian folklore, particularly as a record producer, broadcaster, author, folklore collector and performer".
- In 2001, Centenary Medal
- In 2004, Judith Hosier Award: Bush Laureate Golden Gumleaf Award for lifetime achievement in bush balladry 2004.
- In 2013, Rebel Studios released a one-hour bio documentary on Fahey's work titled Larrikin Lad which was screened on SBS and released as a DVD by ABC Video. The documentary was selected to be screened on Qantas for four months of 2014.
- In 2015, Australian Sound Recording Association Life Achievement Award.

=== ARIA Music Awards ===
The ARIA Music Awards is an annual awards ceremony that recognises excellence, innovation, and achievement across all genres of Australian music. They commenced in 1987.

| Year | Nominee / work | Award | Result | Ref. |
|---|---|---|---|---|
| 2009 | Australia: Folk Songs & Bush Verse | Best World Music Album | Nominated | |

=== Don Banks Music Award ===
The Don Banks Music Award was established in 1984 to publicly honour a senior artist of high distinction who has made an outstanding and sustained contribution to music in Australia. It was founded by the Australia Council in honour of Don Banks, Australian composer, performer and the first chair of its music board.

| Year | Nominee / work | Award | Result |
|---|---|---|---|
| 2010 | Warren Fahey | Don Banks Music Award | awarded |
