= Charlie McMahon =

Australian didgeridoo player

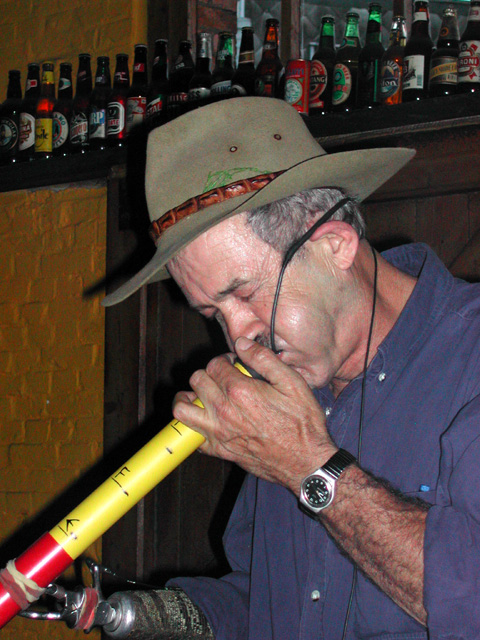
- Charlie McMahon playing the didjeribone in 2002. The microphone going into his mouth is the "Face Bass," a seismic microphone that captures the subtleties of sound inside his mouth while he is playing.

Charlie McMahon is an Australian didgeridoo player. The founder of the group Gondwanaland, McMahon was one of the first non-Aboriginal musicians to gain fame as a professional player of the instrument. He is also the inventor of the didjeribone, a sliding didgeridoo made from two lengths of plastic tubing and played somewhat in the manner of a trombone (hence its name).

== Early life ==
In 1955, Jedda, the first Australian feature movie filmed in colour, was released, and the McMahons, living in the Blue Mountains outside of Sydney, were just one Australian family among many who went to see it. The film was notable for being the first mainstream Australian movie to have Aboriginal actors in the lead roles and characters that acknowledged the existence of, and identification with, an indigenous culture.

Jedda, in the screenplay, is an Aboriginal girl adopted by a white station owner's wife to replace her own child who had died (coincidentally, the station owner's surname, McMann, is a variation of the Irish surname McMahon). Deliberately isolated from all contact with her birth family and relations, Jedda, is unsure of her identity until she meets Marbuck, a tribal Aboriginal man in trouble with the European system of justice. She is seduced by his intense didgeridoo playing but their elopement into the wilderness ends in tragedy when Marbuck's tribe rejects him for having broken its own laws regarding marriage. Marbuck, spurned by both the old and the new cultures, jumps off a cliff and takes Jedda with him.

The movie was also significant for its presentation of panoramic outback scenery and its mixture of documentary and fiction (curiously, the destruction of the last reel of the film in a plane crash meant the movie's dramatic climax had to be refilmed in McMahon's home environment, the Blue Mountains).

After the show young Charlie McMahon had been so absorbed by his cinema experience he tried to imitate the gut-stirring didge sound he heard in the movie by blowing into a garden hose and various hollow household objects like vacuum cleaner nozzles. He also developed an ongoing fascination with Aboriginals and their lives an unlikely interest for a four-year-old as "there weren't any black fellas living near us". He also took to running away and wandering in the scrub for comparatively long periods. Later, when he got older, he used to live off the land for a night and generally "went native" whenever he could.

During 1958, when he was 7 years old, the McMahon family relocated from the Blue Mountains to the tough outer western suburb of Blacktown near Sydney, but McMahon still managed to find ways to "go bush" regularly.

In 1967, McMahon blew off his right arm experimenting with a homemade rocket in a friend's backyard at Seven Hills, a neighbouring suburb of Blacktown. The Sydney Morning Herald newspaper report of the incident stated that the friend, Ron Carley, had some of his fingers amputated so presumably both boys were holding the cylinder at the time it exploded.

During a lengthy recuperation period getting used to his new metal arm (which, true to character, he wrapped in goanna hide) McMahon reactivated his earlier interest in didgeridoo playing, this time as therapy. At the same time he concentrated on previously neglected school work. During study breaks McMahon used to relax by going off to the sand flats of the Windsor River with his bongo playing brother Phil and some mates and the "westie tribe" would dress up in loincloths, paint their faces and have a corroboree.

With the wild side of his nature given an occasional outlet McMahon settled into study and won a university scholarship, achieving an honorary degree in Arts and Town Planning which led to him becoming, for a year, a lecturer and tutor in Town Planning at The University of Sydney. McMahon has said he became interested in studying town planning as a possible future way of correcting the all too obvious mistakes he found in the running of Blacktown. He wrote a treatise on the subject but became disillusioned when he realised the many political and vested interests trying to prevent the ideal becoming a reality.

One fateful weekend at Australia's equivalent of Woodstock, the 1973 Nimbin Aquarius Festival, McMahon found himself intrigued by the performance of The White Company an experimental Theatre Troupe featuring a number of alternative culture artists including one Peter Carolan, a 25-year-old actor with roles in Australian TV's Skippy the Bush Kangaroo, The Rovers, and stage productions such as Servant of Two Masters, and Graham Bond's Drip Dry Dreams. Carolan came from a musical family. His mother played classical piano; his father was a professional jazz musician who performed on accordion, piano, organ, and synthesiser; and his paternal grandfather, Bart Carolan, was a composer and arranger who worked for a time at the BBC. The Carolan family had immigrated to Australia from England when Peter was 18. At the time his gift for creating flowing melodies "with spine" was noticed by McMahon, Carolan was playing lap dulcimer, an instrument to which he was attracted because of its simplicity – "a primal drone, a strummed rhythm and a monophonic melody that could change mode by tuning". No direct communication between the two musicians was made at the festival but they had both noticed each other's presence.

In 1974 a three-day arts festival season by the White Company at Sydney's Arts Castle venue included a performance by McMahon. After a productive post-show dulcimer and didgeridoo improvisation session in a dome on the roof of the venue the two players realised they had many attitudes towards music in common: McMahon was attracted to music with "atmosphere" while Peter had become interested in composing music that evoked a sense of "place" after hearing Maurice Jarre's 1962 score for the film Lawrence of Arabia. The two players made a vague promise to "do something in music together sometime in the future.

In 1974, back at his day job, McMahon was growing increasingly disillusioned with what he later described as the "too much talk" atmosphere of campus academic life. During one particularly stifling lecture in a dungeon-like library basement with no windows and bare walls McMahon and his assistant interrupted their discussion of map interpretation with the impulsive act of encouraging the students to join them in painting the walls. This behaviour was seen by the University Chancellor as the ultimate act of confrontation and defiance of authority by an untameable teacher and McMahon was dismissed.

He decided to do something more practical so he bought a 40-acre (16 ha) property in a thickly forested valley on the south coast of New South Wales with two of his brothers and settled down to building a house the hard way by hand (and hook), all the time learning more about bush craft and living in a natural environment—skills that would come in handy for his next cycle of experience in the desert regions of Central Australia.

In early 1978, McMahon jumped on stage during a Midnight Oil performance at French's Tavern in Sydney and added his didge sounds to their song "Stand in Line." This marked the beginning of a friendship that was to last throughout both their music careers (in 1978 Midnight Oil had only played a half dozen or so gigs under that name).

After two and a half years of labouring and living on his diminishing savings he finished his bush retreat and was fortunate to be offered a job working for the Federal Department of Aboriginal Affairs in the position of a Development Coordinator in the Northern Territory, supervising outstation work grants to tribal people living hundreds of kilometres west of Alice Springs at the settlements of Kintore, Kiwirrkurra Community, Western Australia, and Papunya (the 1971 birthplace of the Australian Aboriginal dot painting revival).

An important part of McMahon's initial work program to supervise the building of a store and meeting place for the local people as the levelling of an air strip for the Royal Flying Doctor Service. He also helped construct a 400 km chain of windmills and water bores in the Great Sandy Desert area, many times driving a three-ton water truck with only a thrown right hook to stabilise the steering wheel in rough country. Because of his obvious sincerity and work for the tribal communities McMahon was sometimes invited to observe traditional ceremonies held under the resplendent starlight of nighttime Central Australia.

After 18 months he took some time off to gig with Midnight Oil, where he learned set dynamics and the art of talking to an audience from watching frontman Peter Garrett.

== 1980s ==
In 1980, encouraged by Tony Walker, an announcer from Triple J (an Australian alternative music radio station), McMahon sold his Toyota Land Cruiser work truck and embarked on a two-month exploratory holiday to the United States starting in San Francisco, then going on to Los Angeles and Fresno. Some soundtrack work beckoned in Hollywood on a 1981 horror film called Wolfen but a musician's strike delayed the recording and, returning to San Francisco, McMahon, in the same week, missed his plane flight home and had his wallet, containing all his money, stolen creating the urgent need to find some way to earn a living wage and save for the air trip back to Australia.

He found gigs on the daunting (and taunting) San Francisco punk club circuit and survived spectacularly with an improvised solo act alternating original didgeridoo compositions with stories based on memories of his desert experiences. He also involved himself musically on stage with whoever else was performing at the same venue. One such partnership resulted when McMahon was invited to join Timothy Leary's 1980 lecture tour for a few gigs. McMahon formed a band with some musicians he met in San Francisco: Mark Isham, Kurt Wortman, and Pat Cooley. They performed under the name The Yidaki Brothers and they did their own improvised acid rock take on the subjects of some of McMahon's stories. Another notable combination was with punk electronics group Indoor Life whose songs of urban frustration "buried in cement" were dominated by the sound of a trombone fed through a synthesizer.

After five months of work he found himself earning about 500 dollars a week and quickly developing a fan base but, having reached one goal, financial, it was time to aim for the next one, creative, which for McMahon meant the recording of an album which he felt could only be done in Australia, the source of his musical inspiration.

McMahon returned to Sydney and, in 1981, received his first major Australia-wide publicity when the Adelaide music paper Roadrunner published a lengthy article with the intriguing heading "This Years Thing? One Armed Didgerdu Players? It's No Joke! Says Miranda Brown."

As McMahon later stated, "I realised what I wanted to do was work with a good synth player – a very good synth player. So I mucked around with a few guys in Sydney but their range was too narrow then I remembered hearing Peter Carolan's playing ten years ago. He was playing a dulcimer in the bush and when I heard he was now playing synth I knew straight away this was the melody man to compose that key part of Gondwanaland." They worked on their first composition, "Pulse," inspired by the sound of a heartbeat.

In the following months Carolan continued to create ideal music settings for McMahon's didgeridoo and expanded on his key image ideas such as an emu running, a drought, an eagle flying, and a landscape stretching beyond the horizon. Carolan's use of simple but powerful melodies linked to intelligently emotional arrangements openly conveyed in sound those poetic moments "when time stops and the joys, and mysteries of life are felt."[19]

In 1984 McMahon and Carolan assembled a small studio band of musician friends and recorded the first Gondwanaland album under the title Terra Incognita. When released on the small independent Hot label it was a critical and popular success.

In October 1984, shortly after the debut of the first album, McMahon went "on the swag" again, only to be caught up in a sensationalist media drama when a group of nine Aboriginals, known as the Pintupi Nine, were encountered near the last of a chain of water bores he had been overseeing between Kintore and "the remotest outpost in Australia"—Kiwirrkurra. A visiting journalist hyped the incident into a biblical "finding of the lost tribe" but the people concerned were not "lost" but had instead "gone walkabout" after rejecting attempts by 1950s Woomera rocket range personnel to resettle them at Papuna. The small tribal group managed to go through their usual birth, initiation, marriage, and death rituals for decades, living off the natural resources of their desert environment before "coming in" to face the anger, and relief, of their relatives. McMahon's diary at the time noted "Tomorrow [16 Oct 1984] we will find the two men's tracks and maybe they will spend their last night free of the modern world".

In April 1985 McMahon was flown to London to perform with the London Philharmonic Orchestra on the recording of Maurice Jarre's Mad Max Beyond Thunderdome soundtrack.

When he returned a month later an advertisement was placed in a music paper "Gondwana Wana Drummer." Only one reply was received – from an energetic multi – format percussionist called Eddy Duquemin as equally at home on electric pad drums as he was on acoustic "skins'. He joined the live Gondwanaland band and McMahon decided to make the group his full time occupation. Because of his restless stage presence, Duquemin was soon given the nickname "Brolga" by McMahon—the brolga being an Australian outback bird that is renowned for its dancing; Carolan had already been dubbed "Lizard," although this was later changed to "Professor.

In November 1985, Midnight Oil commenced a 26-date local tour starting in Dubbo with Gondwanaland supporting. As well as feeding them to the mosh pit, this gave the newly constituted three piece some "tour of duty" exposure [if not exactly the type of audience they were hoping to attract].

In 1986, Let the Dog Out, Gondwanaland's second album, was released. It contained a bracket of aggressive, up-tempo numbers followed by two extended compositions, the first of which, "Ephemeral Lakes," later became a regular choice for meditative ambient music compilations.

Midnight Oil's Black Fella/White Fella tour of remote Northern Territory Aboriginal settlements in July 1986 recruited McMahon with the task of "co-ordinating the tour group's camping and guiding requirements and [contributing] plenty of common sense and a touch of sanity as well" A tour book entitled Strict Rules, by Andrew McMillan, and a video: "Black Fella White Fella," were subsequently released and McMahon features in both.

In 1987, after a year of extensive live work in Sydney and an Arts Council-sponsored four-week tour of the Northern Territory, the third album, self-titled Gondwanaland, was released. It had taken many months to record and while the prolonged touring helped tighten the arrangements some of the groups intense live energy was diluted by the usual studio technique of making a separate recording of each member's instrumental part before a final mix. Despite this limitation the album won the Australian music industry's ARIA Award for best indigenous album of 1988. One track from this collection, the outstanding "Landmark," features a dramatic use of McMahon's re-invention of an instrument first made in the 1970s in the UK by Dr Peter Holmes, the multi-tone, slide didgeridoo called "didjeribone."

In November 1988 Gondwanaland performed during the "Tomita Sound Cloud in Sydney – Hymn To Mankind," a A$3 million, Japanese government sponsored, light and sound, opera spectacular held on Sydney Harbour as part of the Australian Bicentennial celebrations. The concert attracted an audience of over 120,000 an Australian record for a live music event.

== 1990s to the present ==
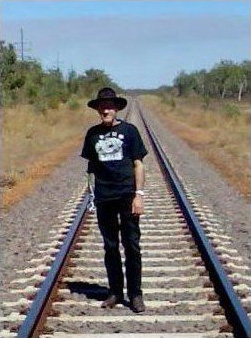
McMahon at Pine Creek, Northern Territory, Australia, July 2007

In 1991, Gondwanaland's Wide Skies was released.

In 1992, McMahon appeared in a film with Indigenous didgeridoo master David Blanasi.

In 1994, after the great leap forward of Wide Skies, McMahon formed a second band, Gondwana, with an emphasis on rhythm and increasingly dominant bass and experimental didge sounds. The band released three albums: Travelling, Xenophon, and Bone Man, with the last two featuring another McMahon innovation: the mouth-held use of a geologist's seismic microphone to amplify the growling subsonic didge dynamics. This approach to music gave McMahon a new audience: the trance/dance crowd.

In 2005 McMahon experienced a bizarre case of déjà vu when he found himself, 20 years after his 1985 London Mad Max soundtrack work, in Russia with a new manager associated with a Mad Max Smash and Crash "theme park." The episode was made the subject of a quirky Foreign Correspondent report in March 2006.

In 2006 Peter Carolan released a sampler CD called Overland, collecting examples, old and new, of his various music explorations.

In August 2008 McMahon released a DVD storage disc library of over 800 samples under the title "Rhythm Organism".

On 24 April 2012 McMahon released a subdued and mellow Gondwana album called Didge Heart. On 28 July 2012 Peter Carolan died at the age of 64.

== Discography ==
=== Unreleased early Charlie McMahon live tape compilation ===
- Long Way My Country Journey Home; Blue Wren at Waterhole; Swooped By Eagles; Spirit Dawn [McMahon]; Trek; Campsite [McMahon / Yidaki Brothers] Recorded San Francisco US Various Venues December 1980

=== Cassette ===
- 1981 Didge/Synth [cover illustration: an Emu mesmerised by an Eye in the Sky] Hot

=== CDs ===
- Terra Incognita – Gondwanaland [Hot / Log] 1984 / 1987
- Let The Dog Out – Gondwanaland [Hot /Log] 1986 / 1987
- Gondwanaland / Big Land – Gondwanaland [WEA] 1987 [LOG] 1993
- Wild Life – Live – Gondwanaland [WEA] 1989
- Wide Skies – Gondwanaland [Log] 1991
- Travelling – Gondwana [Log] 1994
- Tjilatjila – Charlie McMahon [Log] 1996
- Xenophon – Gondwana [Log] 1998
- Over Gondwanaland – Compilation [Latisphere] 2000
- Spirit of Gondwana – Compilation [Latisphere] 2000
- Bone Man – Gondwana [Log] 2002
- Overland – Peter Carolan sampler album [McMahon on "Airwaves" and "Dragonflies"] [Origin] 2006
- Didge Heart – Gondwana 2012

=== Compilation ===
- Savoy Sound – Wave Goodbye (CD Presents, 1981)

=== Unreleased Gondwanaland tracks ===
- 1986 Land of the Lightning Brothers Soundtrack – Ancient Mysteries; Legend; Visiting The Gallery; Land of the Lightning Brothers; Battle of the Lightning Brothers; Protecting the Paintings; Boomerangs
- 1987 Ochre Dusk Dance Suite – World's End; Time Flies; Homelands
- 1988 Trob

=== Other media ===
- 1987 Bedrock [Video clip]
- 1987 Land of the Lightning Brothers [Film Australia video]
- 1987 Ochre Dusk [Original Gondwanaland dance score for Dance North Company]
- 1988 Sound Cloud Spectacular with Tomita, Sydney Harbour [Gondwanaland performance]
- 1988 A Big Country – Charlie McMahon [60-minute special ABC television]
- 1989 Gondwanaland – Live at Kuranda [unreleased 2-hour video]
- 1991 Nature of Australia [ABC DVD of 5-hour TV series with Gondwanaland score]
- 1991 Until the end of the World [Gondwanaland appearance] Village Roadshow Film
- 1992 Didjeridu With Charlie McMahon [dir. Jeni Kendell and Paul Tait] Gaia Films
- 1997 The Didjeridu from Arnhem Land to Internet [pp. 123–37] John Libbey 1997
- 1999 Swarm, Sydney Youth Orchestra and Gondwana, Australia Day Lunch, Sydney
- 2000 Gondwana performance Australian Pavilion, World Expo, Hannover
- 2000 Gondwana performance Opening Ceremony, Sydney Paralympic Games
- 2006 Mad Max Goes to Moscow – [ABC TV Foreign Correspondent Series]
- 2006 The ABC of Our Lives – 50 Years of Television – [5 November Australian TV special mentioned that the 1991 Nature of Australia documentary series, with an extensive Gondwanaland score, has been seen – and heard – by an estimated 100+ million people worldwide]

== See also ==
- Gondwanaland (Australian band)
- Modern didgeridoo designs
