= Gondwanaland (Gondwanaland album) =

Studio album by Gondwanaland
- Released: 1987
- Recorded: Sydney, 1987
- Genre: Progressive electronic
- Label: WEA
- Producer: Gondwanaland, Paul Radcliffe

Gondwanaland chronology
Let the Dog Out (1985)	Gondwanaland (1987)	Wildlife (1990)

Gondwanaland is the third studio album by Australian musical ensemble Gondwanaland. It was released in 1987 and peaked at number 93 on the Kent Music Report.

At the ARIA Music Awards of 1988, the album won the ARIA Award for Best Indigenous Release.

== Track listing ==
- All tracks written by Charlie McMahon, Eddy Duquemin & Peter Carolan.
1. "Bedrock" - 6:16
2. "Troppo (Dry) / Troppo (Wet)" - 7:13
3. "Swamp" - 3:13
4. "VJD - Communication" - 4:20
5. "Hair of the Dog" - 3:48
6. "Rainforest" - 5:50
7. "Landmark" - 5:52
8. "Worlds End" - 4:20
9. "Overland" - 3:42
10. "Bullant" - 3:00

== Charts ==
Chart (1987/88)	Peak position
Australian (Kent Music Report)	93
