= 1988 ARIA Music Awards =

Annual Australian music awards

- Date: 29 February 1988
- Venue: Sheraton Wentworth Hotel, Sydney, New South Wales

Highlights
- Most wins: John Farnham; Midnight Oil (3 each)
- Most nominations: Icehouse; Midnight Oil (5 each, known)
- Website: ariaawards.com.au

The Second Australian Recording Industry Association Music Awards (generally known as the ARIA Music Awards or simply the ARIAs) was held on 29 February 1988 at the Sheraton Wentworth Hotel in Sydney. Cliff Richard was the host, with Bryan Ferry, Feargal Sharkey and Ian "Molly" Meldrum included as presenters of the 21 awards. Other presenters were Rudi Grassner (RCA/BMG boss), Col Joye and Richard Wilkins. There were no live performances and the awards were not televised. A shouting match developed between manager Gary Morris, accepting awards for Midnight Oil, and former Countdown compere Meldrum who was presenting.

Some significant changes were made for the second ARIA Awards. In addition to the categories for the inaugural year, "Best Children's Album" was added. The ARIA Hall of Fame was also created, with six acts being inducted: AC/DC, Slim Dusty, Col Joye, Johnny O'Keefe, Dame Joan Sutherland and Vanda & Young. Finally an "Outstanding Achievement Award" was created and first awarded to John Farnham.

== Ceremony details ==
Midnight Oil won "Best Cover Art" for Diesel and Dust and both "Best Single" and "Best Song" for "Beds Are Burning". A shouting match developed between manager Gary Morris, accepting awards for Midnight Oil, and former Countdown compere Ian "Molly" Meldrum who was presenting:

I think Molly was a little precious. He was in awe of Bryan [Ferry], whereas I had an attitude about bringing over offshore artists to present at a local awards [...] I said something like, 'The Poms look at us as being pretty archaic down here, but we've got room service. You could have ordered an iron, mate'.

— Gary Morris

Morris had also objected to ARIA's award category, Best Indigenous Release, as some nominees (including Midnight Oil themselves) had no Indigenous members. Meldrum objected to Morris' political commentary from the podium and the making jokes at the expense of Bryan Ferry who was wearing a (deliberately) crumpled suit:

I pointed out that Gary was staying in one of the very expensive hotel rooms, on behalf of Midnight Oil [...] Then I said, 'If we're talking about disrespect, what was he doing up here accepting the awards and not Midnight Oil'. Then it all boiled over.

— Ian Meldrum

Karen Middleton of The Canberra Times was disappointed by the ceremony where "[i]nsults flowed almost as freely as the wine and all three of the international guest presenters fell victim to flimsy jokes and foolishness". She felt that Morris was "winner of the unofficial prize for least-liked personality. ... [he] aimed a poor one-liner at British presenter Bryan Ferry". However the "greatest revelation of the evening proved that there are more sore losers in the business than the small screen would lead us to believe. When a winner happened to be a little unpopular, the beautiful people booed".

== Awards and nominations ==
Winners are listed first and bolded, other final nominees (where known) are listed alphabetically.

=== ARIA Awards ===
- Album of the Year
  - **Icehouse – Man of Colours**
- Single of the Year
  - **Midnight Oil – "Beds Are Burning"**
    - Dave Dobbyn with Herbs – "Slice of Heaven"
    - Icehouse – "Crazy"
- Highest Selling Album
  - **Icehouse – Man of Colours**
- Highest Selling Single
  - **Kylie Minogue – "Locomotion"**
    - Dave Dobbyn with Herbs – "Slice of Heaven"
- Best Group
  - **Crowded House**
    - Hunters & Collectors
    - Icehouse
    - INXS
    - Midnight Oil
- Best Female Artist
  - **Jenny Morris – Body and Soul**
    - Anne Kirkpatrick – Come Back Again
    - Kate Ceberano
    - Sharon O'Neill
    - Shona Laing
- Best Male Artist
  - **John Farnham**
- Best New Talent
  - **Weddings Parties Anything – Scorn of the Women**
    - Dave Dobbyn
    - James Reyne
    - Lime Spiders
    - Painters and Dockers
- Best Country Album
  - **Flying Emus – This Town**
    - Anne Kirkpatrick – Come Back Again
- Best Indigenous Release
  - **Gondwanaland – Gondwanaland**
    - Australia all Over – Australia all Over
    - Flying Emus – This Town
    - Midnight Oil – Diesel and Dust
    - Warumpi Band – Go Bush
- Best Adult Contemporary Album
  - **John Farnham – "Touch of Paradise"**
- Best Comedy Release
  - **The 12th Man – Wired World of Sports**
    - Garry Who – "Life's Just a Routine"

=== Fine Arts Awards ===
- Best Jazz Album
  - **Vince Jones – It All Ends Up in Tears**
    - The Don Burrows Quintet with the Adelaide Connection – Nice 'n' Easy
- Best Classical Album
  - **Voss (Australian Opera) – Voss**
    - Dave Loew and the National Arts Orchestra Australia – Debut
- Best Children's Album
  - **Peter Combe – Toffee Apple**
- Best Original Soundtrack / Cast / Show Recording
  - **Original Australian Cast Recording – Nine**
    - Original Motion Picture Soundtrack (Mario Millo) – The Lighthorsemen

=== Artisan Awards ===
- Song of the Year
  - **Peter Garrett, Rob Hirst & Jim Moginie – "Beds Are Burning" (Midnight Oil)**
    - Dave Dobbyn – "Slice of Heaven" (Dave Dobbyn with Herbs)
    - Icehouse – "Crazy"
- Producer of the Year
  - **Mark Opitz**
    - Andrew Farriss
    - Jon Farriss
- Engineer of the Year
  - **David Nicholas – Richard Clapton – Glory Road, INXS – Kick**
- Best Video
  - **Claudia Castle – Paul Kelly – "To Her Door"**
- Best Cover Art
  - **Ken Duncan, Creative Type Wart, Gary Morris, Midnight Oil – Midnight Oil – Diesel and Dust**

== Outstanding Achievement Award ==
- John Farnham

== Multiple nominations and awards ==
Artists who received multiple nominations
Known nominations	Artist
5	Icehouse
5	Midnight Oil
4	Dave Dobbyn
3	John Farnham
3	Andrew Farriss (Note: Including two as a member of INXS.)
3	Jon Farriss
3	Herbs (Note: All shared with Dave Dobbyn.)
2	Flying Emus
2	INXS
2	Anne Kirkpatrick

Artists who received multiple awards
Wins	Artist
3	John Farnham
3	Midnight Oil
2	Icehouse

== ARIA Hall of Fame inductees ==
The inaugural Hall of Fame inductees were:

- AC/DC
- Slim Dusty
- Col Joye
- Johnny O'Keefe
- Dame Joan Sutherland
- Vanda & Young
