= Human Love (Coloured Stone album) =

Studio album by Coloured Stone
- Released: 1986
- Recorded: June 1986
- Studios: Trafalgar Studios, Sydney
- Label: Powderworks
- Producer: Coloured Stone

Human Love is the third studio album by Australian band, Coloured Stone. It was released in 1986.

At the ARIA Music Awards of 1987 the album won the ARIA Award for Best Indigenous Release.

== Track listing ==
1. "Cry Cry" - 3:27
2. "Human Love" - 4:10
3. "Don't Want the World to Fall Apart" - 3:14
4. "The Brush" - 3:10
5. "Dancing in the Moonlight" - 3:46
6. "Alice Springs" - 3:46
7. "Truganinni's Dreaming" - 4:33
8. "That's the Girl That's in My Eyes" - 3:06
9. "Easy World" - 4:10
10. "Our Cry" - 3:27
11. "Waiting for the Tide" - 3:27
12. "Don't Drink and Drive" - 2:50

== Personnel ==
- Bunna Lawrie — lead vocals, rhythm guitar
- Selwyn Burns — lead guitar, backing vocals
- Mackie Coaby — bass, backing vocals
- Bart Willoughby — drums, backing vocals
