= Blekbala Mujik =

- Origin: Barunga, Northern Territory, Australia
- Genres: Rock; reggae
- Years active: 1986–present
- Label: CAAMA/Shock
- Members: Peter Miller; Lazarus Murray (a.k.a. Gulindirriy); Lachlan Lawrence; Johnny Blanasi; Michael Havir; Dwayne Billy; Hason Fuller; Allen Murphy; Sammy Bush

Blekbala Mujik (Black People's Music) are an Australian rock, reggae group formed in Barunga, Northern Territory in 1986. They fused rock and reggae with a pop, dance sound and have support base for their live shows and recordings. They are cited in the World Music: The Rough Guide as next best known to Yothu Yindi. The band sings in English and in Kriol (a creole language based on English and Australian Aboriginal languages). At the ARIA Music Awards of 1996 their album, Blekbala Mujik (May 1996), was nominated for Best Indigenous Release.

== History ==
Blekbala Mujik were formed in 1986 in the rural community of Barunga (Gulin-Gulin) in central Arnhem Land. The founding member, Peter Miller on vocals and guitar, lives in Alice Springs, and was a member of the Northern Land Council. The band sings partly in English and partly in Kriol, which is a creole language based on English and Australian Aboriginal languages. Blekbala mujik means "blackfella music" in Kriol.

The group signed with Central Australian Aboriginal Media Association (CAAMA) and, in 1990, they issued two albums, Nitmiluk and Midnait Mujik. In 1993 they issued a seven-track cassette, Come-N-Dance. In May 1996 they followed with their eponymous full-length album, Blekbala Mujik, via CAAMA and distributed by Shock Records, which Australian musicologist, Ian McFarlane, described as "a mix of catchy Aboriginal pop, reggae, techno-tribal dance material and bright funky rock." At the ARIA Music Awards of 1996 in September, Blekbala Mujik was nominated for Best Indigenous Release.

Alongside Miller other members have included Dwayne Billy on percussion (clapsticks), Johnny Blanasi on lead guitar, Jason Fuller on percussion (clapsticks), Lachlan Gela Lawrence on bass guitar and vocals, Wayne Kala Kala on drums, Allen Murphy on drums (ex-Warumpi Band, Village People, Yothu Yindi), Lazarus Murray on yidaki (see didjeridoo) and Thomas Valandhu on drums. In June 1997 they issued "Walking Together" as a CD single. In February 2013 they issued a new album, We Are One, and followed with a compilation, live album, Greatest Hits Live, in September 2014. Five of the songs on this album were recorded live at the 1995 Barunga Festival and others during a 2012 tour of the Northern Territory.

== Band members ==
- Peter Miller – guitar, vocals
- Lazarus Murray (a.k.a. Gulindirriy) – didgeridoo, vocals
- Lachlan Lawrence – bass guitar, vocals
- Johnny Blanasi – lead guitar
- Michael Havir – keyboards, accordion
- Dwayne Billy – clapsticks
- Jason Fuller – clapsticks, vocals, dancing
- Allen Murphy – drums, vocals
- Sammy Bush – lead vocals
- Ngarritj Ducky – clapsticks

== Discography ==
=== Albums ===
Title	Details
Nitmiluk	Released: 1990; Label: CAAMA; Format: Cassette, Vinyl
Midnait Mujik	Released: 1990; Label: CAAMA; Format: Cassette, Vinyl
Come-N-Dance	Released: 1993; Label: CAAMA (CAAMA 226 CD); Format: Cassette, CD, Vinyl
Blekbala Mujik	Released: May 1996; Label: CAAMA Music (CAAMA 244 CD); Format: CD
We Are One	Released: February 2013; Label: CAAMA Music (CAAMA 436); Format: CD, Digital download
Greatest Hits Live	Released: 2014; Label: CAAMA Music (CAAMA 509); Format: CD, Digital download

== Awards ==
=== ARIA Music Awards ===
The ARIA Music Awards is an annual awards ceremony that recognises excellence, innovation, and achievement across all genres of Australian music. They commenced in 1987.

Year	Nominee / work	Award	Result
1996	Blekbala Mujik	Best Indigenous Release	Nominated

=== Deadly Awards ===
The Deadly Awards, (commonly known simply as The Deadlys), was an annual celebration of Australian Aboriginal and Torres Strait Islander achievement in music, sport, entertainment and community. They ran from 1996 to 2013.

Year	Nominee / work	Award	Result
1996	Blekbala Mujik	Album of the Year	Won

== Bibliography ==
Blekbala Mujik have been cited in numerous articles on Indigenous Australian music.
