= Flying Emus =

Australian band

- Origin: Sydney, Australia
- Genres: Country, bluegrass
- Years active: 1984–1990, 2013–present
- Members: Genni Kane; John Kane; Mike Kerin; Ian Simpson; Michael Vidale; Wayne Goodwin
- Past members: Graham Thompson; Malcolm Wakeford; Hanuman Dass

Flying Emus are an Australian country/bluegrass band that formed in 1984 and released four studio albums, including, This Town, which won an ARIA Award for Best Country Album in 1988. They disbanded in 1990. At the Country Music Awards of Australia in January 2013, John Kane (guitar, mandolin), announced they had reformed with other founders: his younger sister Genni Kane on lead vocals and guitar, Mike Kerin on violin and mandolin and Ian Simpson on banjo, joined by new member Michael Vidale on bass guitar.

== History ==
=== 1984–1991 ===
In 1984 the Flying Emus were formed in Sydney with Genni Kane and her older brother John Kane, Mike Kerin, and Ian Simpson, as a country, bluegrass group. In 1985 the band released their debut studio album, Look Out Below, which won Instrumental of the Year at the 1986 CMAA Country Music Awards. At the same ceremony they won Vocal Group of the Year for their song "Diamond Creek". At the 1987 CMAA awards, the band took Instrumental of the Year again, for the track "Emu Strut". In October 1986 they supported Steeleye Span in a show at the Canberra Theatre, where local correspondent Robert Hefner of The Canberra Times praised the vocals of Genni Kane, violin work by Kerin and banjo by Simpson.

In 1987 the band released This Town and in September of that year they supported Suzanne Vega at the Sydney Town Hall. Tharunka's Jim Dwyer felt the venue did not suit their intimate style. At the 1988 CMAA awards the group won Instrumental of the Year for the third consecutive year with the track "Jackaroo", and secured another Vocal Group of the Year for "Auctioneer". They won Best Country Album for This Town at the ARIA Music Awards of 1988.

In 1989 the band released Postcards from Paradise, which was nominated for an ARIA Award for Best Country Album in 1990. Also in that year they released their final studio album, Thank You and Goodnight, before breaking up. At the 1991 CMAA awards they won Instrumental of the Year for the fourth time with the track "Dixie Breakdown".

=== 2013–present: Reformation and The Collection ===
In January 2013 at the Country Music Awards of Australia, band member John Kane announced the group were reforming. In December 2013 the Flying Emus announced a reunion tour for January 2014 with the four original members (John and Genni Kane, Simpson and Kerin) joined by Michael Vidale on bass. A compilation album, Flying Emus: The Collection, was released through Warner Music on 10 January 2014, with tracks from the band's four albums spanning from 1984 to 1990. 4ZZZ said, "Pretty good at whatever they chose to do: country, pop, trad-folk, the Flying Emus were at their best, I think, when doing bluegrass. Bluegrass bands are renowned for their crazy soloing, but even amongst them The Flying Emus have the skills to make you do a double-take."

== Members ==
- Genni Kane (Genevieve Wilby) – lead vocals, guitar
- John Kane – guitar, mandolin
- Mike Kerin – violin, mandolin, guitar, vocals
- Ian Simpson – banjo, guitar
- Hanuman Dass – percussion
- Graham Thompson – bass guitar
- Michael Vidale – bass guitar
- Malcolm Wakeford – drums, percussion
- Wayne Goodwin – violin
- Lucky Oceans – pedal steel guitar
- Michael Rose – pedal steel guitar

Credits:

== Discography ==
List of albums, with selected details
Title	Album details
Look Out Below	Released: 1985; Label: Larrikin Records (LRF-166); Format: LP, Cassette
This Town	Released: September 1987; Label: Infinity Records, Festival (38815); Format: LP, Cassette, CD
Postcards From Paradise	Released: 1989; Label: Infinity, Festival (30045); Format: LP, Cassette, CD
Thank You and Goodnight	Released: 1990; Label: Infinity, Festival (30471); Format: LP, CD
The Collection 1984–1990	Released: 10 January 2014; Greatest Hits collection; Label: Festival Records / Warner (FEST1024); Format: CD, DD

=== Singles ===
List of singles as lead artist
Title	Year	Album
"Wheeler/Dealer"	1985	Look Out Below
"It's a Sunburnt Country"	1986	This Town
"I'm In Love with Love"	1987	This Town
"Hey Sister"	1988	This Town
"This Town"	1988	This Town
"I Just Want to Dance With You"	1988	Postcards from Paradise
"Different Drum"	1989	Postcards from Paradise
"I Don't Know About That"	1989	Thank You and Goodnight
"Dixie Breakdown"	1990	Thank You and Goodnight

== Awards ==
=== ARIA Music Awards ===
The ARIA Music Awards is an annual awards ceremony that recognises excellence, innovation, and achievement across all genres of Australian music. Flying Emus have won one awards from five nominations.

Year	Nominee / work	Award	Result
1988	This Town	Best Country Album	Won
1988	This Town	Best Indigenous Release	Nominated
1989	"I Just Want to Dance With You"	Best Country Album	Nominated
1989	"This Town" / "Darling Street"	Best Indigenous Release	Nominated
1990	Postcards From Paradise	Best Country Album	Nominated

=== Country Music Awards of Australia ===
The Country Music Awards of Australia (CMAA) (also known as the Golden Guitar Awards) is an annual awards night held in January during the Tamworth Country Music Festival, celebrating recording excellence in the Australian country music industry. They have been held annually since 1973. Flying Emus have won six awards.

Year	Nominee / work	Award	Result
1986	"Look Out Below"	Instrumental of the Year	Won
1986	"Diamond Creek"	Vocal Group of the Year	Won
1987	"Emu Strut"	Instrumental of the Year	Won
1988	"Auctioneer"	Vocal Group of the Year	Won
1988	"Jackaroo"	Instrumental of the Year	Won
1991	"Dixie Breakdown"	Instrumental of the Year	Won

- Note: Wins only
