= Dave de Hugard =

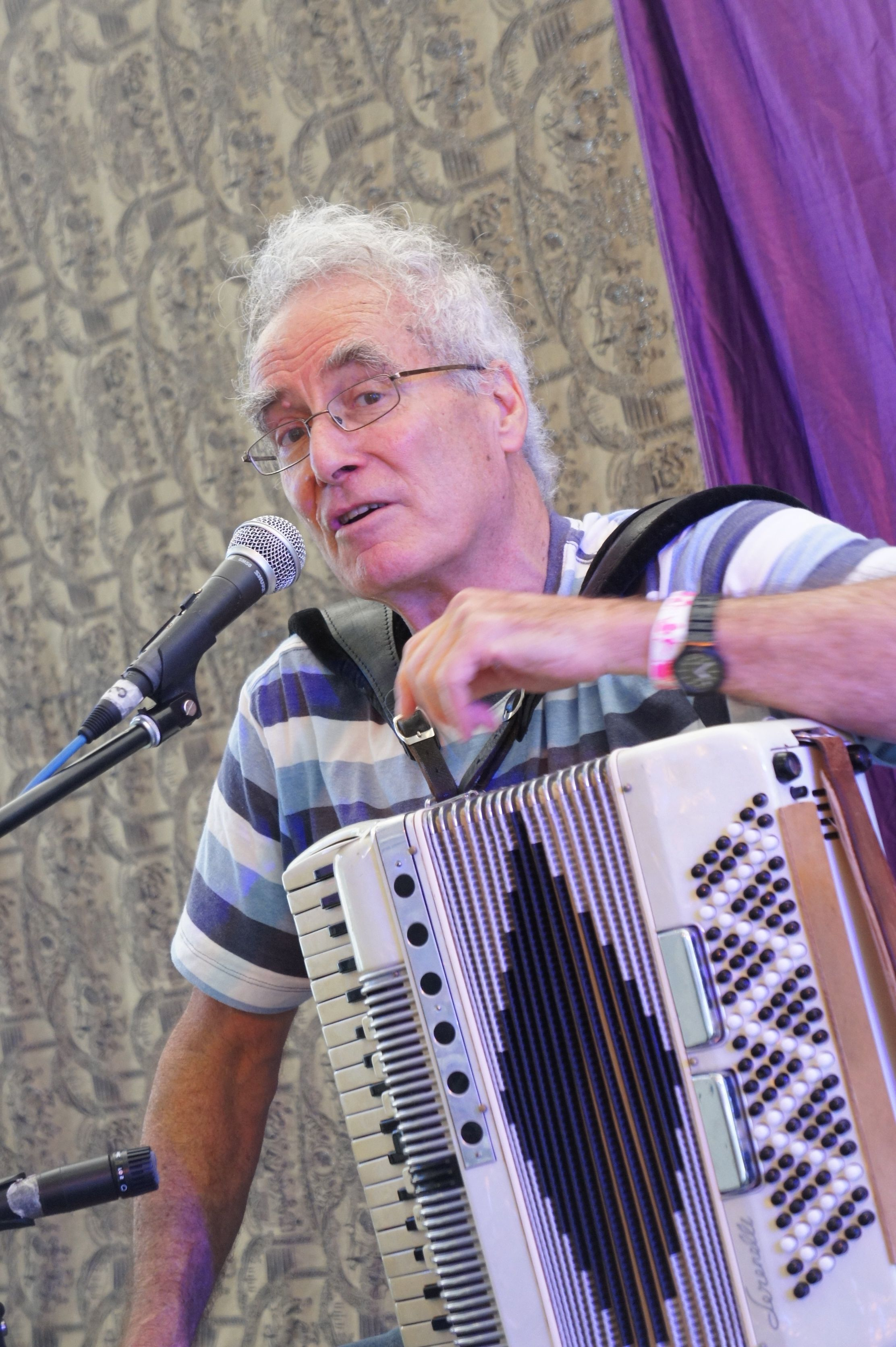
- Dave de Hugard at Illawarra Folk Festival, 2014

Background information
- Born: 1945 (age 79–80)

Dave de Hugard (born 1945) is an Australian musician and folklorist. He has been described as "the country's foremost interpreter of the 'old bush songs'". He was nominated for the 1987 ARIA Award for Best Indigenous Release.

== Discography ==
- Freedom on the wallaby : Australian bush songs (1970)
- On the steps of the dole office door : oral images of the Great Depression in Australia. (1977) - Larrikin
- The Magpie in the Wattle (1986) - Larrikin
- Magpie morning (1993) - Sandstock Music
- Songs of the Wallaby Track (2003) - Folk Alliance Australia

with The Wild Colonials

- Euabalong Ball (1971) - EMI
