= This Town (album) =

Studio album by Flying Emus
- Released: September 1987
- Label: Infinity, Festival Records

Flying Emus chronology
Look Out Below (1985)	This Town (1987)	Postcards From Paradise (1989)

This Town is the second studio album by Australian country/blues group, Flying Emus. It was released in September 1987.

At the ARIA Music Awards of 1988, the album won the ARIA Award for Best Country Album.

== Track listing ==
No.	Title	Writer(s)	Length
1.	"I'm in Love with Love"	Genni Kane, John Kane
2.	"This Town"	John Kane
3.	"Darling Street"	Genni Kane, John Kane
4.	"Hey Sister"	Genni Kane, John Kane
5.	"Old Man"	Genni Kane, Jeremiah Tehunai, John Kane
6.	"Something Somewhere"	Genni Kane, John Kane
7.	"Say Old Man"	traditional (adapted by Ian Simpson, John Kane)
8.	"It's a Sunburnt Country"	Genni Kane, John Kane
9.	"Auctioneer"	John Kane
10.	"Jackaroo"	Ian Simpson, John Kane, Mike Kerin
11.	"Crocodile Water"	Genni Kane, John Kane
12.	"Coalminer"	John Kane
13.	"If You Won't Go Away"	Genni Kane, John Kane
