= Modern didgeridoo designs =

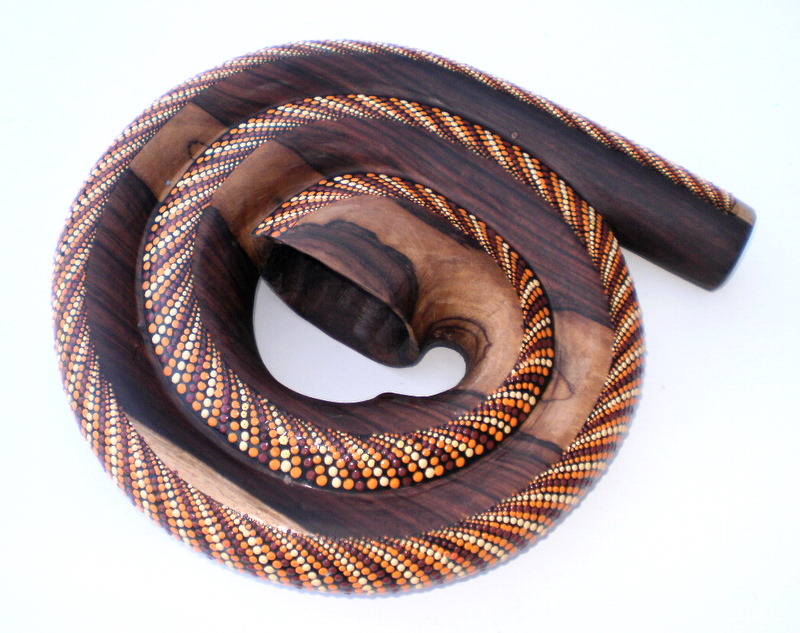
The spiral didgeridoo is a type of non-traditional didgeridoo with similarities to a natural horn

Modern didgeridoo designs are distinct from the traditional Australian Aboriginal didgeridoo, and are innovations recognized by musicologists. Didgeridoo design innovation started in the late 20th century using non-traditional materials and non-traditional shapes. The design changes include features that are similar to more familiar musical instruments like the trombone and natural horn.

The modern didgeridoo design innovations differ from traditional authentic didgeridoos because they are not made by Indigenous Australians in a traditional style and do not use eucalyptus branches hollowed by termites. Some didgeridoo design innovations, like the sliding didgeridoos, are also multi-tonal, unlike monotonal traditional didgeridoos. Like traditional didgeridoos, modern didgeridoo innovations produce a drone sound and are classified as aerophones.

== Sliding didgeridoos ==
The sliding didgeridoo, or didgiphone, uses a telescopic mechanism to create a variable pitch instrument, and can be made from plastic, aluminium or wood.

=== Didjeribone ===
A Didjeribone, with trombone-like features.

Invented by didgeridoo player Charlie McMahon, the Didjeribone design is a cross between the didgeridoo and trombone, and consists of two plastic tubes placed inside the other. The sliding inner tube creates nine different tones, similar to the trombone mechanism. This enables the pitch to be varied mid-song, unlike traditional didgeridoos. As a result of eliminating the monotonal aspects of traditional didgeridoos, the Didjeribone can be used in horn concertos. The Didjeribone has a pitch range from high G to low B. The length is 65" extended, and 37.5" closed. The flared end also gives a brighter and louder sound.

=== Slide didge ===
Scott Dunbar independently created a version of the variable pitch didgeridoo instrument called the slide didge in the early 1990s. The slide didge was the world's first commercially sold variable pitch didgeridoo, and Scott later produced the world's first timber slide didge.

== Carbon-fiber didgeridoos ==
Many modern didgeridoos are now built from carbon fiber, plastics, or other synthetic/composite materials rather than traditional termite-hollowed wood. These newer materials are valued for their greater durability, resistance to changes in humidity and temperature, and lighter weight—important both for touring performers and for travel instruments. For example, the Airdidge is a travel didgeridoo made from 100 % carbon fibre; it packs down to about 37 cm, extends to 186 cm, and is described by its maker as “absolutely unempfindlich gegen Nässe, Kälte und Hitze” (completely insensitive to moisture, cold, and heat). didgehouse. Similarly, the company Carbony offers didgeridoos made from aerospace-grade carbon fiber composite, claiming they are geometrically stable (don’t warp), avoid cracking or rotting, and deliver more consistent tone across varying weather conditions. Carbony Celtic Winds In addition to carbon fiber, synthetic plastics are used: for example, Meinl’s synthetic series didgeridoos, made of lightweight plastic, are marketed as weather-resistant, durable, and suitable for outdoor use, offering an alternative to wood didgeridoos for players in climates or settings where wood might crack or degrade.

== Travel didgeridoos ==
The travel didgeridoos are also called traveller didgeridoo or compact didgeridoos, indicating the compact size originally designed for portability by folding the length of the didgeridoo. They are made from wood, plastic or resin, and are usually monotonal.

=== Didgebox ===
The original "Didjbox" was invented by Marko Johnson in 1995. The first production line didgebox was released in 1999. Since then, numerous versions of didgebox have been developed, including the traveler box, obelisk box, didj flute, meditator and mindblower. The didgebox is monotonal and made in the specific keys C, D, and E.

=== Biking PVC didgeridoo ===
The Biking PVC Didgeridoo, also named as a Cyclophonica Didge and Bike Didge, was developed by the Cyclophonica Bicycle Orchestra, founded in 1999 in Rio de Janeiro- Brazil. It is built with a number of 50 mm PVC pipe sections and 90-degrees curved PVC connections. The complete length is approx. 1200 mm, producing a steady C drone sound and a G overblowing tone. The construction method includes cutting the cylindrical parts, joining them with the connections and making a "mouthpiece" from the pipe end by heating it up and molding it to better adapt in the player's mouth. The main interesting features are that it can be used while the player is cycling - with no accident risks to the audience or player- and that a trained performer is able to make circular breathing while doing the physical work required for biking with the Cyclophonica.

=== Spiral didgeridoo ===
The spiral didgeridoo is also known variously as a spiral didge, spiralidoo, didgehorn or snail didgeridoo. Its spiral shape makes it more like a natural horn, and instruments are monotonal in C, C#, D, E, and F. The construction method includes splitting the wood, carving, and gluing back together to form the basic instrument.

== Other modern didgeridoo types ==
A keyed didgeridoo (having keys somewhat like those of a saxophone, allowing the performer to play melodically) was developed in the late 20th century by the U.S. didgeridoo player Graham Wiggins (stage name Dr. Didg) and used on his CDs Out of the Woods (1995) (in the track "Sun Tan") and Dust Devils (2002) (in the tracks "T'Boli" and "Sub-Aqua"). Wiggins built the unique and somewhat unwieldy instrument in 1990 at the physics workshop of Oxford University, from which he earlier obtained his Ph.D.

Multidrone didgeridoos have been created by William Thoren, a U.S didgeridoo player and crafter. The construction method and technique was developed in 2008 that gives a didgeridoo the possibility to produce multiple drone notes on a single didgeridoo. William has designed a larger cup-shaped mouthpiece with a concave face that is close to double the diameter of a regular didgeridoo mouthpiece. This mouthpiece gives a player more room to control the vibration of their lips at frequencies below the traditional drone. The technique is similar to playing pedal tones on a brass instrument. The desired tone is different from that provided by brass, and therefore the embouchure used to play it is different from that used for brass. The most prominent playable note on these instruments is always one octave below the fundamental didgeridoo drone. Several other drone-notes can be played below the fundamental as well, and these correlate with notes that exist in the harmonic series above the drone.

=== Closed end didgeridoo ===
The "closed end didgeridoo" was invented by Richard J Marquette in 2009. Created by leaving end opposite of mouthpiece closed. Then holes and designs are carved and drilled into the closed end for the sound to flow out.

=== Celloridoo ===
In 2015 Aidin Ardjomandi won A’DESIGN Award by inventing a new brand musical instrument, the Celloridoo, which was a hybrid one by a combination of Cello and the Didgeridoo. The aerophone part of Celloridoo is played with continuously vibrating lips to produce the drone while using a special breathing technique called circular breathing. This requires breathing in through the nose whilst simultaneously expelling stored air out of the mouth using the tongue and cheeks and the chordophone part is played with a bow. A chordophone needs a Pegbox, a neck and a resonance box, and an aerophone needs a pipe and a mouthpiece so the pipe under the mouthpiece became to peg box and neck to install finger board on it, and the lowest part of it became to a resonance box to install bridges, holes and keep the strings.
