= Didgeridoo =

Traditional Australian musical instrument

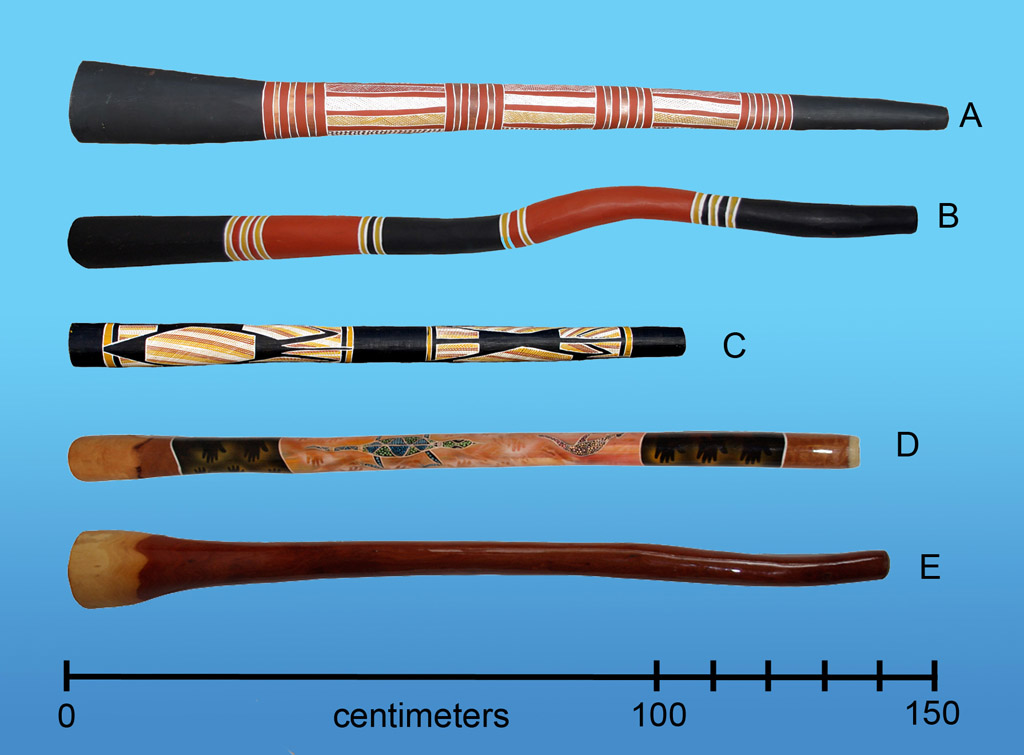
- A, B and C: traditionally made didgeridoos. D and E: non-traditional didgeridoos
- Other names: Didjeridu, yiḏaki, mandapul, mako, and various other local names
- Classification: Wind; Aerophone
- Hornbostel–Sachs classification: 423.121.11 (end-blown straight tubular natural trumpet without mouthpiece)

Playing range
- Written range: fundamental typically A2 to G3

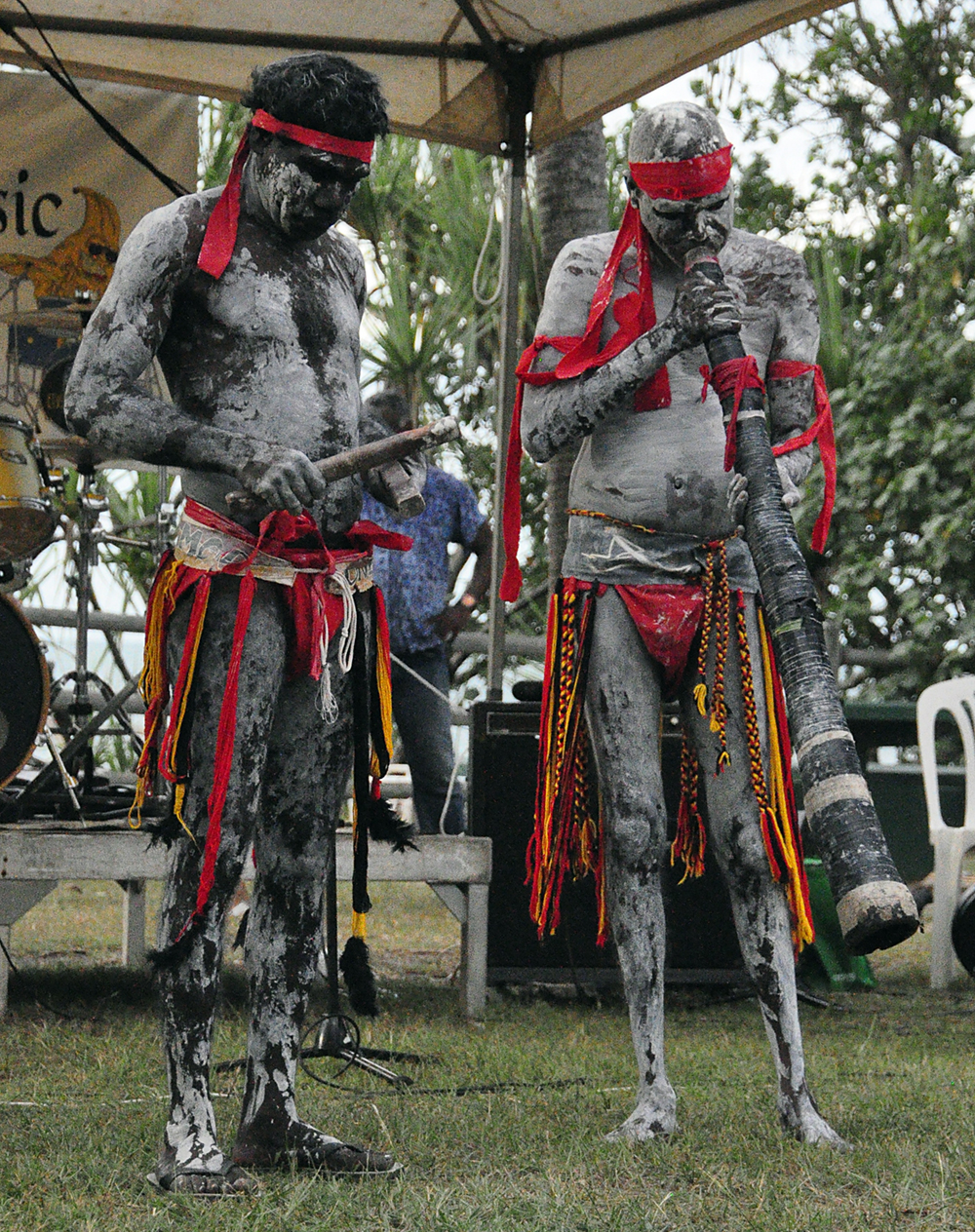
Didgeridoo and clapstick players performing at Nightcliff, Northern Territory

Sound of didgeridoo

A didgeribone, a sliding-type didgeridoo

The didgeridoo (/ˌdɪdʒəriˈduː/; also spelt didjeridu, among other variants) is a wind instrument, played with vibrating lips to produce a continuous drone while using a special breathing technique called circular breathing. The didgeridoo was developed by Aboriginal peoples of northern Australia at least 1,000 years ago, and is now in use around the world, though still most strongly associated with Indigenous Australian music. In the Yolŋu languages of the indigenous people of northeast Arnhem Land the name for the instrument is the yiḏaki, sometimes more recently also called mandapul. In the Bininj Kunwok language of West Arnhem Land it is known as mako (pronounced, and sometimes spelt, as mago).

A didgeridoo is usually cylindrical or conical, and can measure anywhere from 1 to 3 m (3 to 10 ft) long. Most are around 1.2 m (4 ft) long. Generally, the longer the instrument, the lower its pitch. Flared instruments play a higher pitch than unflared instruments of the same length.

== History ==
There is currently no consensus on the exact age of the didgeridoo. Archaeological studies suggest that people of the Kakadu region in Northern Australia have been using the didgeridoo for less than 1,000 years, based on the dating of rock art paintings. A clear rock painting in Ginga Wardelirrhmeng, on the northern edge of the Arnhem Land plateau, from the freshwater period (that had begun 1500 years ago) shows a didgeridoo player and two song-men participating in an Ubarr ceremony. It is thus thought that it was developed by Aboriginal peoples of northern Australia, possibly in Arnhem Land.

T. B. Wilson's Narrative of a Voyage Round the World (1835) includes a drawing of an Aboriginal man from Raffles Bay on the Cobourg Peninsula (about 350 kilometres (220 mi) east of Darwin) playing the instrument. Others observed such an instrument in the same area, made of bamboo and about 3 feet (0.9 m) long. In 1893, English palaeontologist Robert Etheridge, Junior observed the use of "three very curious trumpets" made of bamboo in northern Australia. There were then two native species of bamboo growing along the Adelaide River, Northern Territory.

According to A. P. Elkin, in 1938, the instrument was "only known in the eastern Kimberley [region in Western Australia] and the northern third of the Northern Territory".

== Etymology ==
The name didgeridoo is not of Aboriginal Australian linguistic origin and is considered to be an onomatopoetic word. The earliest occurrences of the word in print include a 1908 edition of the Hamilton Spectator referring to a "'did-gery-do' (hollow bamboo)", a 1914 edition of The Northern Territory Times and Gazette, and a 1919 issue of Smith's Weekly, in which it was referred to as a "didjerry" and was said to produce the sound "didjerry, didjerry, didjerry and so on ad infinitum".

A rival explanation, that didgeridoo is a corruption of the Irish phrase dúdaire dubh or Scottish Gaelic dùdaire dúth, is controversial. Irish dúdaire or dúidire, and Scottish Gaelic dùdaire, are nouns that, depending on the context, may mean "trumpeter", "hummer", "crooner" or "puffer", while Irish dubh means "black", and Scottish Gaelic dúth means "native".

== Other names ==
There are numerous names for the instrument among the Aboriginal peoples of northern Australia, none of which closely resemble the word "didgeridoo" (see below). Some didgeridoo enthusiasts, scholars and Aboriginal people advocate using local language names for the instrument.

Yiḏaki (transcribed yidaki in English, sometimes spelt yirdaki) is one of the most commonly used names although, strictly speaking, it refers to a specific type of the instrument made and used by the Yolngu peoples of north-east Arnhem Land. Some Yolngu people began using the word mandapul after 2011, out of respect for the passing of a Manggalili man who had a name sounding similar to yidaki.

In west Arnhem Land, it is known as a mako, a name popularised by virtuoso player David Blanasi, a Bininj man, whose language was Kunwinjku, and who brought the didgeridoo to world prominence. However the mako is slightly different from the Yiḏaki: usually shorter, and sounding somewhat different – a slightly fuller and richer sound, but without the "overtone" note. The word is pronounced mago and is sometimes spelt that way.

There are at least 45 names for the didgeridoo which are still used in the lingua franca by some Aboriginal people. The following are some of the more common regional names.

| People | Region | Local name |
|---|---|---|
| Anindilyakwa | Groote Eylandt | ngarrriralkpwina |
| Arrernte | Alice Springs | ilpirra |
| Djinang (a Yolngu people) | Arnhem Land | yiḏaki |
| Gagudju | Arnhem Land / Kakadu | garnbak |
| Gupapuygu | Arnhem Land | yiraka |
| Iwaidja | Cobourg Peninsula | artawirr |
| Jawoyn | Katherine / Nitmiluk / Kakadu | gunbarrk |
| Kunwinjku | Arnhem Land / Kakadu | mako |
| Mayali | Alligator Rivers | martba |
| Ngarluma | Roebourne, W.A. | kurmur |
| Nyul Nyul | Kimberleys | ngaribi |
| Pintupi | Central Australia | paampu |
| Warray | Adelaide River | bambu |
| Yolngu | Arnhem Land | mandapul (yiḏaki) |

== Description and construction ==
A didgeridoo is usually cylindrical or conical, and can measure anywhere from 1 to 3 m (3 to 10 ft) long. Most are around 1.2 m (4 ft) long. Generally, the longer the instrument, the lower its pitch or key. However, flared instruments play a higher pitch than unflared instruments of the same length.

The didgeridoo is classified as a wind instrument and is similar in form to a straight trumpet, but made of wood. It has also been called a dronepipe.

=== Traditional ===
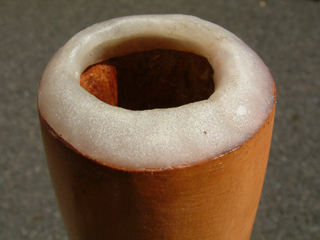
A wax mouthpiece can soften during play, forming a better seal.

Traditional didgeridoos are usually made from hardwoods, especially the various eucalyptus species that are endemic to northern and central Australia. Generally the main trunk of the tree is harvested, though a substantial branch may be used instead. Traditional didgeridoo makers seek suitably hollow live trees in areas with obvious termite activity. Termites attack these living eucalyptus trees, removing only the dead heartwood of the tree, as the living sapwood contains a chemical that repels the insects. Various techniques are employed to find trees with a suitable hollow, including knowledge of landscape and termite activity patterns, and a kind of tap or knock test, in which the bark of the tree is peeled back, and a fingernail or the blunt end of a tool, such as an axe, is knocked against the wood to determine if the hollow produces the right resonance. Once a suitably hollow tree is found, it is cut down and cleaned out, the bark is taken off, the ends trimmed, and the exterior is shaped; this results in a finished instrument. A rim of beeswax may be applied to the mouthpiece end.

=== Modern ===
Non-traditional didgeridoos can be made from native or non-native hard woods (typically split, hollowed and rejoined), bamboo, glass, fibreglass, metal, agave, clay, resin, PVC piping and carbon fibre. These typically have an upper inside diameter of around 3 centimetres (1.2 in) down to a bell end of anywhere between 5 and 20 centimetres (2 and 8 in) and have a length corresponding to the desired key. The end of the pipe can be shaped and smoothed to create a comfortable mouthpiece or an added mouthpiece can be made of any shaped and smoothed material such as rubber, a rubber stopper with a hole or beeswax.

Modern didgeridoo designs are distinct from the traditional Australian Aboriginal didgeridoo, and are innovations recognised by musicologists. Didgeridoo design innovation started in the late 20th century, using non-traditional materials and non-traditional shapes. The practice has sparked, however, a good deal of debate among indigenous practitioners and non-indigenous people about its aesthetic, ethical, and legal issues.

=== Decoration ===
Didgeridoos can be painted by their maker or a dedicated artist using traditional or modern paints while others retain the natural wood grain design with minimal or no decoration.

== Playing ==
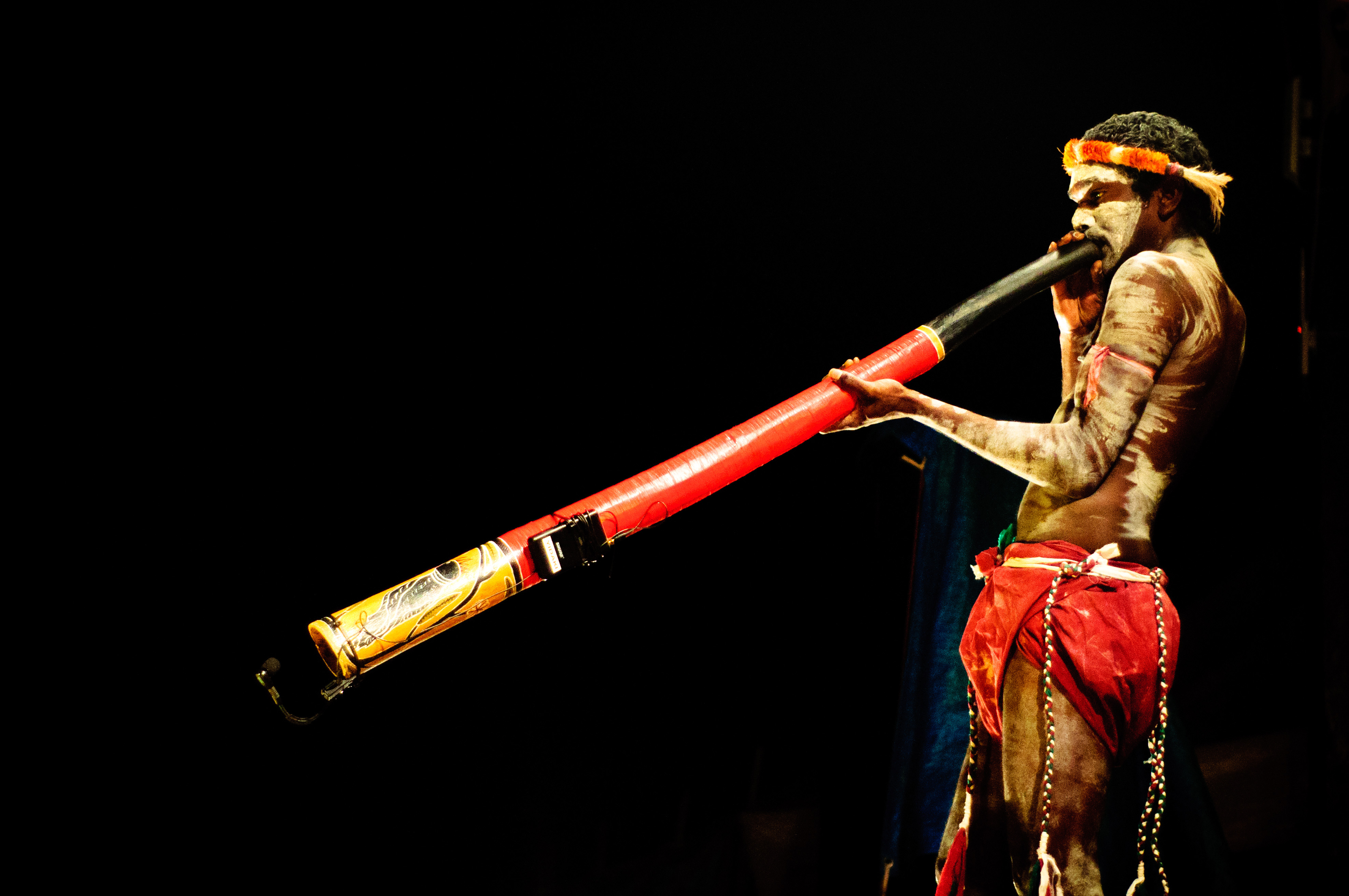
Ŋalkan Munuŋgurr performing with East Journey

A didgeridoo can be played simply by producing a vibrating sound of the lips to produce the basic drone. More advanced playing involves the technique known as circular breathing. The circular breathing technique requires breathing in through the nose while simultaneously using the muscles of the cheeks to compress the cheeks and release the stored air out of the mouth. By using this technique, a skilled player can replenish the air in their lungs, and with practice they can sustain a note for as long as desired. Recordings exist of modern didgeridoo players playing continuously for more than 40 minutes; Mark Atkins on Didgeridoo Concerto (1994) plays for over 50 minutes continuously. Although circular breathing does eliminate the need to stop playing to take a breath, discomfort might still develop during a period of extended play due to chapped lips or other oral discomfort.

The didgeridoo functions "as an aural kaleidoscope of timbres" and "the extremely difficult virtuoso techniques developed by expert performers find no parallel elsewhere".

The didgeridoo player and composer William Barton has expanded the role of the instrument in the concert hall both with his own orchestral and chamber music works and with those written or arranged for him by prominent Australian composer Peter Sculthorpe.

== Physics and operation ==
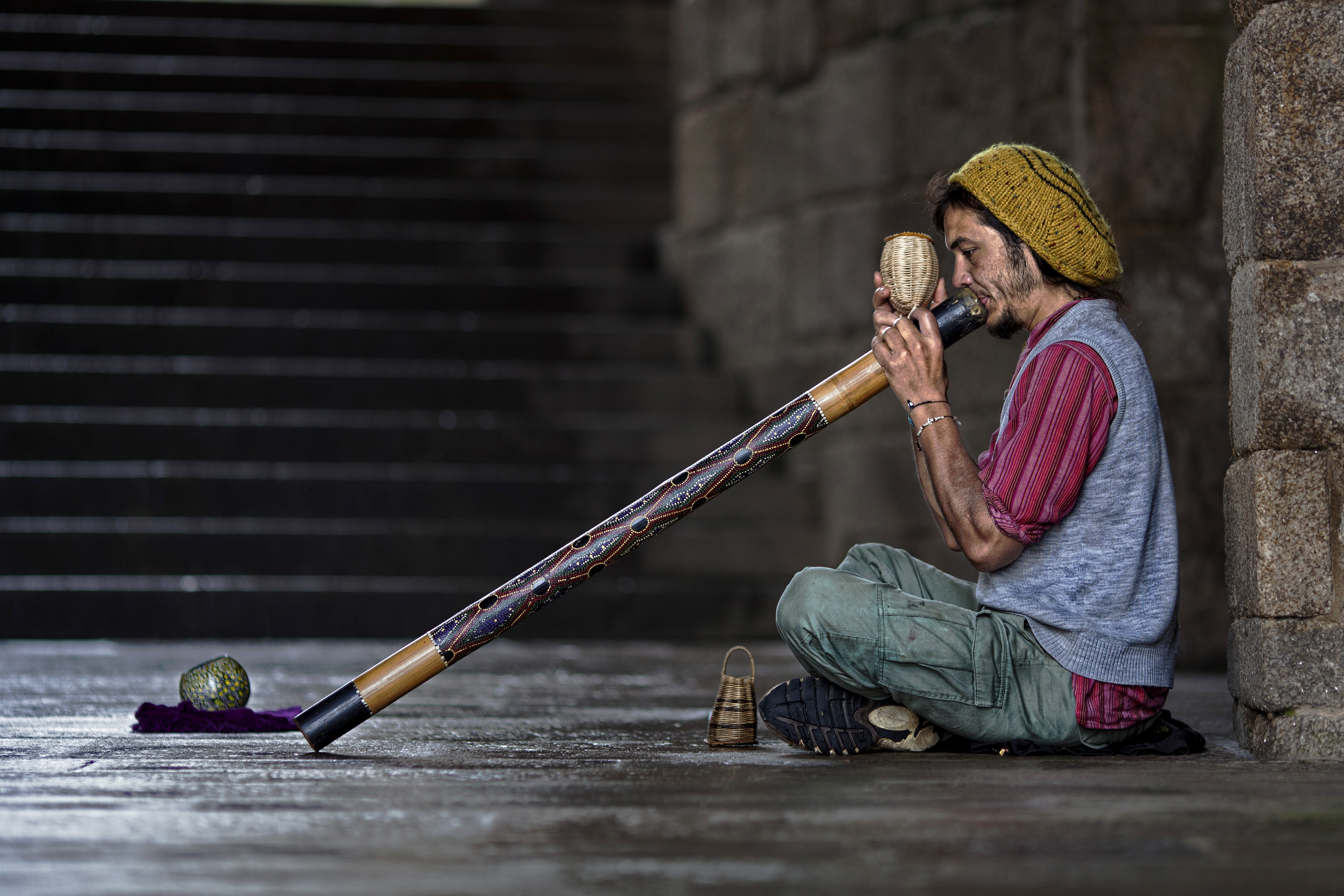
Didgeridoo street player in Spain

A termite-bored didgeridoo has an irregular shape that, overall, usually increases in diameter towards the lower end. This shape means that its resonances occur at frequencies that are not harmonically spaced in frequency. This contrasts with the harmonic spacing of the resonances in a cylindrical plastic pipe, whose resonant frequencies fall in the ratio 1:3:5 etc. The second resonance of a didgeridoo (the note sounded by overblowing) is usually around an 11th higher than the fundamental frequency (a frequency ratio of 8:3).

The vibration produced by the player's lips has harmonics in the ratio 1:2:3 etc. However, the non-harmonic spacing of the instrument's resonances means that the harmonics of the fundamental note are not systematically assisted by instrument's resonances, as is usually the case for Western wind instruments (e.g., in the low range of the clarinet, the 1st, 3rd, and 5th harmonics of the reed are assisted by resonances of the bore).

Sufficiently strong resonances of the vocal tract can strongly influence the timbre of the instrument. At some frequencies, whose values depend on the position of the player's tongue, resonances of the vocal tract inhibit the oscillatory flow of air into the instrument. Bands of frequencies that are not thus inhibited produce formants in the output sound. These formants, and especially their variation during the inhalation and exhalation phases of circular breathing, give the instrument its readily recognisable sound.

Other variations in the didgeridoo's sound can be made by adding vocalisations to the drone. Most of the vocalisations are related to sounds emitted by Australian animals, such as the dingo or the kookaburra. To produce these sounds, the players use their vocal folds to produce the sounds of the animals while continuing to blow air through the instrument. The results range from very high-pitched sounds to much lower sounds involving interference between the lip and vocal fold vibrations. Adding vocalisations increases the complexity of the playing.

== In popular culture ==
Charlie McMahon, who formed the group Gondwanaland, was one of the first non-Aboriginal players to gain fame as a professional didgeridoo player. He has toured internationally with Midnight Oil. He invented the didjeribone, a sliding didgeridoo made from two lengths of plastic tubing; its playing style is somewhat in the manner of a trombone.

It was featured on the British children's TV series Blue Peter.

Industrial music bands like Test Dept use the didgeridoo.

Early songs by the acid jazz band Jamiroquai featured didgeridoo player Wallis Buchanan, including the band's first single "When You Gonna Learn", which features prominent didgeridoo in the introduction and solo sections.

Ambient artist Steve Roach uses it in his collaborative work Australia: Sound of the Earth with Australian Aboriginal artist David Hudson and cellist Sarah Hopkins, as well as Dreamtime Return.

It is used in the Indian song "Jaane Kyon" from the film Dil Chahta Hai.

Chris Brooks, lead singer of the New Zealand hard rock band Like a Storm, uses the didgeridoo in some songs, including "Love the Way You Hate Me" from their album Chaos Theory: Part 1 (2012).

Kate Bush made extensive use of the didgeridoo, played by Australian musician Rolf Harris, on her album The Dreaming (1982), which was written and recorded after a holiday in Australia.

Singer and multi-instrumentalist Xavier Rudd plays the didgeridoo and features the instrument frequently in his recordings

Stephen Colbert has come under fire and accusations of racism in 2023 for using a didgeridoo during a comedy sketch about Australia.

== Cultural significance ==
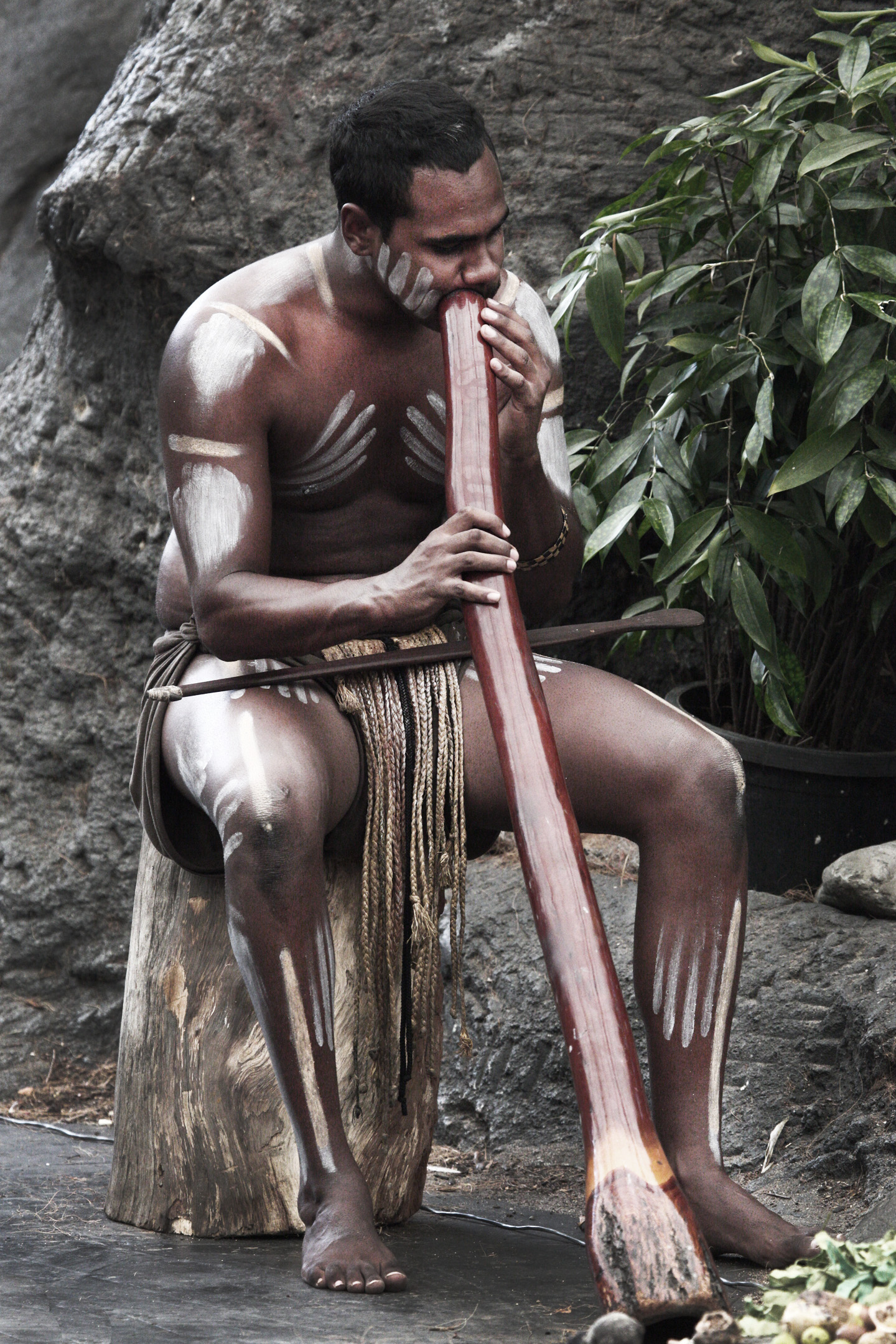
An Indigenous Australian man playing a didgeridoo

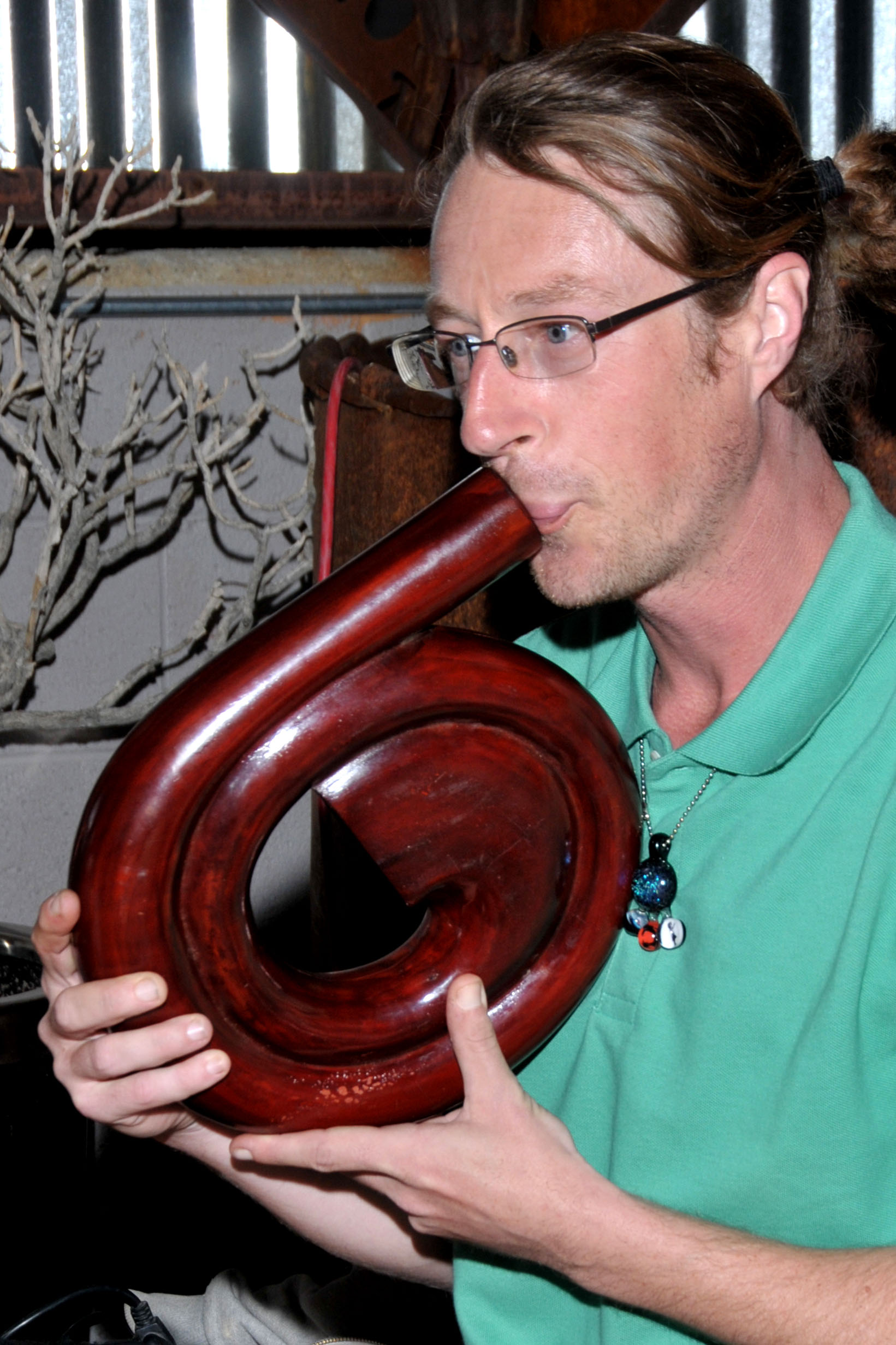
Musician playing a travel or reticulated didgeridoo

Traditionally, the didgeridoo was played as an accompaniment to ceremonial dancing and singing and for solo or recreational purposes. For Aboriginal peoples of northern Australia, the yidaki is still used to accompany singers and dancers in cultural ceremonies. For the Yolngu people, the yidaki is part of their whole physical and cultural landscape and environment, comprising the people and spirit beings which belong to their country, kinship system and the Yolngu Matha language. It is connected to Yolngu Law and underpinned by ceremony, in song, dance, visual art and stories.

Pair sticks, sometimes called clapsticks (bilma or bimla by some traditional groups), establish the beat for the songs during ceremonies. The rhythm of the didgeridoo and the beat of the clapsticks are precise, and these patterns have been handed down for many generations. In the Wangga genre, the song-man starts with vocals and then introduces bilma to the accompaniment of didgeridoo.

=== Sex-based traditional prohibition debate ===
Traditionally, only men play the didgeridoo and sing during ceremonial occasions; playing by women is sometimes discouraged by Aboriginal communities and elders. In 2008, publisher HarperCollins apologised for its book The Daring Book for Girls, which openly encouraged girls to play the instrument, after Aboriginal academic Mark Rose described such encouragement as "extreme cultural insensitivity" and "an extreme faux pas ... part of a general ignorance that mainstream Australia has about Aboriginal culture." However, Linda Barwick, an ethnomusicologist, said that though traditionally women have not played the didgeridoo in ceremony, in informal situations there is no prohibition in the Dreaming Law. For example, in 1966, ethnomusicologist Alice Marshall Moyle made a recording in Borroloola of Jemima Wimalu, a Mara woman from the Roper River, proficiently playing the didgeridoo. In 1995, musicologist Steve Knopoff observed Yirrkala women performing djatpangarri songs that are traditionally performed by men and in 1996, ethnomusicologist Elizabeth MacKinley reported women of the Yanyuwa group giving public performances.

Although there is no prohibition in the area of the didgeridoo's origin, such restrictions have been applied by other Indigenous communities. The didgeridoo was introduced to the Kimberleys in the early 20th century but it was only much later, such as in Rose's 2008 criticism of The Daring Book for Girls, that Aboriginal men showed adverse reactions to women playing the instrument and prohibitions are especially evident in the South East of Australia. The assumption that women are prohibited from playing is widespread among non-Aboriginal people and is also common among Aboriginal communities in Southern Australia; some ethnomusicologists claim that the dissemination of the taboo belief and other misconceptions is a result of commercial agendas and marketing. The majority of commercial didgeridoo recordings available are distributed by multinational recording companies and feature non-Aboriginal people playing a New Age style of music with liner notes promoting the instrument's spirituality which misleads consumers about the didgeridoo's other roles in traditional Aboriginal culture.

The taboo is particularly strong among many Aboriginal groups in the South East of Australia, where it is forbidden and considered "cultural theft" for non-Aboriginal women, and especially performers of New Age music regardless of sex, to play or even touch a didgeridoo.

== Health benefits ==
A 2006 study reported in the British Medical Journal found that practising and playing the didgeridoo helped reduce snoring and obstructive sleep apnea by strengthening muscles in the upper airway, thus reducing their tendency to collapse during sleep. In the study, intervention subjects were trained in and practised didgeridoo playing, including circular breathing and other techniques. Control subjects were asked not to play the instrument. Subjects were surveyed before and after the study period to assess the effects of intervention. A small 2010 study noted marked improvements in the asthma management of 10 Aboriginal adults and children following a six-month programme of once-weekly didgeridoo lessons.

== See also ==
- Aboriginal Centre for the Performing Arts
- Alphorn
- William Barton, didgeridoo virtuoso and orchestral composer
- Djalu Gurruwiwi, master maker and player of yiḏaki
- Erke
- List of didgeridoo players
- Mayan trumpet

== Bibliography ==
- Ah Chee Ngala, P., Cowell C. (1996): How to Play the Didgeridoo – and history. ISBN 0-646-32840-9
- Chaloupka, G. (1993): Journey in Time. Reed, Sydney.
- Cope, Jonathan (2000): How to Play the Didgeridoo: a practical guide for everyone. ISBN 0-9539811-0-X.
- Jones, T. A. (1967): "The didjeridu. Some comparisons of its typology and musical functions with similar instruments throughout the world". Studies in Music 1, pp. 23–55.
- Kaye, Peter (1987): How to Play the Didjeridu of the Australian Aboriginal – A Newcomer's Guide.
- Kennedy, K. (1933): "Instruments of music used by the Australian Aborigines". Mankind (August edition), pp. 147–157.
- Lindner, D. (ed) (2005): The Didgeridoo Phenomenon. From Ancient Times to the Modern Age. Traumzeit-Verlag, Germany.
- Moyle, A. M. (1981): "The Australian didjeridu: A late musical intrusion". in World Archaeology, 12(3), 321–31.
- Neuenfeldt, K. (ed) (1997): The didjeridu: From Arnhem Land to Internet. Sydney: J. Libbey/Perfect Beat Publications.
