= WOMADelaide line-ups =

WOMADelaide is an annual four-day festival of music, arts and dance in Botanic Park, Adelaide, South Australia, one of many WOMAD festivals held around the world. The event has been running for over 30 years, during which time it has hosted a diverse selection of music from artists around the world.

(Acts in bold are headliners)

== 1992 ==
March 13th-15th

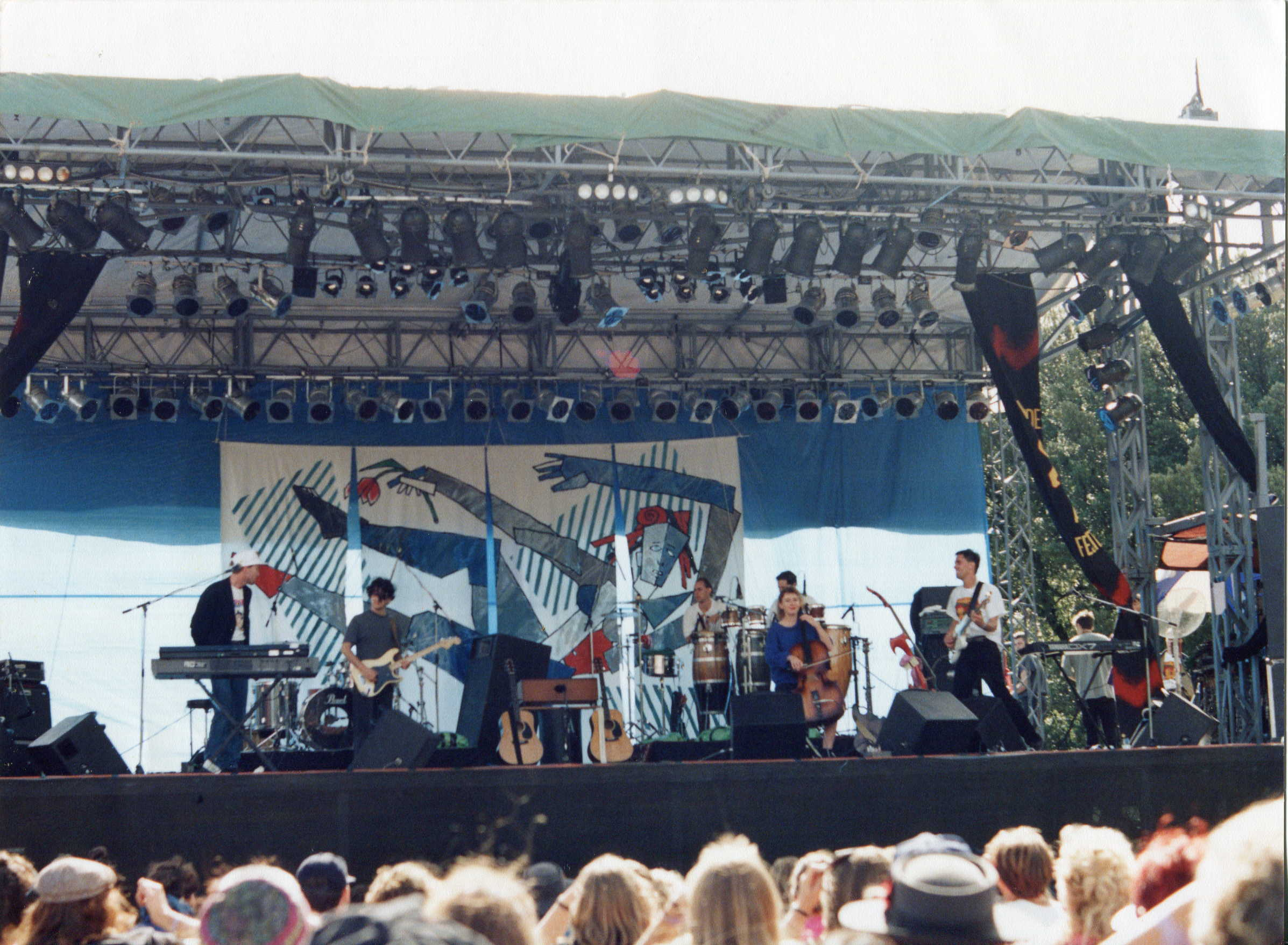
Not Drowning, Waving performing at the first WOMADelaide, 1992

- Archie Roach (Australia)
- Awatinas (Bolivia)
- Ayub Ogada (Kenya)
- Balkana (Bulgaria)
- Blind Man's Holiday (Australia)
- Colin Offord and the Great Bowing Co (Australia)
- Crowded House (New Zealand)
- Dya Singh (India / Malaysia / Australia)
- Flamenco Aire (Australia)
- Great Bowing Co (Australia)
- Guo Yue (China)
- Klezmer Conservatory Band (USA)
- The Mapapa Acrobats and Mandingo (Kenya)
- Mara! (Australia)
- Not Drowning, Waving (Australia / PNG)
- Nusrat Fateh Ali Khan (Pakistan)
- Paul Kelly (Australia)
- Penguin Café Orchestra (UK)
- Remmy Ongala (Tanzania)
- Sile Na Gig (Australia / Ireland)
- Simon O'Dwyer (Australia)
- Sinfonye (Australia)
- Sirocco (Australia)
- Slivanje (Australia)
- Dr L Subramaniam (India)
- Trio Bulgarka and Martenitsa (Bulgaria / Australia)
- Voices of Georgia (Georgia)
- Youssou N'Dour (Senegal)

== 1993 ==
February 19th-21st

=== Stage 1 ===
Friday	Saturday	Sunday
Yothu Yindi (Australia); Mahlathini and The Mahotella Queens (South Africa); SE Rogie (Sierra Leone); The Holmes Brothers (USA); Geoffrey Oryema (Uganda); **Peter Gabriel** (UK)	The Mambologists (Australia); Coloured Stone (Australia); Terem Quartet (Russia); Alistair Black (Australia); Tiddas (Australia); Salif Keita (Mali); Not Drowning, Waving (Australia) with Telek (Papa New Guinea); Szalai Hungarian Gypsy Orchestra (Hungary); **Peter Gabriel** (UK)	The Persuasions (USA); Szalai Hungarian Gypsy Orchestra (Hungary); Terem Quartet (Russia); Mahlathini and The Mahotella Queens (South Africa); Galliano (UK); Sheila Chandra (India/UK); **Salif Keita** (Mali)

=== Stage 2 ===
Friday	Saturday	Sunday
Kunjal; Germaine Acogny (Senegal); **Sheila Chandra** (India/UK)	Meryl Tankard's Australian Dance Theatre (Australia); Zi Lan Liao; Jackie Daly (Ireland); Dya Singh (India/Malaysia/Australia); **Café of the Gate of Salvation** (Australia)	SE Rogie (Sierra Leone); The Holmes Brothers (USA); Geoffrey Oryema (Uganda); Meryl Tankard's Australian Dance Theatre (Australia); Kunjal; Sheila Chandra (India/UK); **Not Drowning, Waving (Australia) with Telek (Papa New Guinea)**

=== The Tent ===
Friday	Saturday	Sunday
SE Rogie: Songs and Stories of Sierra Leone; Alistair Black: Didjeridu Workshop; **Frankie Armstrong** (UK)	Sheila Chandra: The Voice and Drone Workshop; Kunjal: Dance Workshop; Frankie Armstrong: Workshop; Alistair Black: Didjeridu Workshop; Geoffrey Oryema; The Holmes Brothers: Blues Jam; **Terem Quartet**	Jackie Daly; Zi Lan Liao: Ribbon Dance Workshop; Arona N'Diaye: Percussion Workshop; Germaine Acogny: (Senegal): Dance Workshop; Tiddas (Australia); **Fresh Air**

== 1995 ==
February 24th-26th

=== Stage 1 ===
Friday	Saturday	Sunday
Sierra Maestra (Cuba); Geoffrey Oryema (Uganda); **Cruel Sea** (Australia)	Tiddas (Australia); Mouth Music (Scotland); Papa Wemba (Democratic Republic of the Congo); Christine Anu (Australia); Gil Scott-Heron (USA); ALT (Ireland / NZ); Jah Wobble's Invaders of the Heart (UK); **Nusrat Fateh Ali Khan** (Pakistan)	Zap Mama (Cameroon / Zaire); Sunrize Band (Australia); Vika and Linda (Tonga / Australia); Jah Wobble's Invaders of the Heart (UK); Christine Anu (Australia); Hukwe Zawose (Tanzania); Stella Chiwese (Zimbabwe); Salameh and Sridar (Palestine / India); Archie Roach and Ruby Hunter (Australia); Kate Ceberano (Australia); **Papa Wemba** (Democratic Republic of the Congo)

=== Stage 2 ===
Friday	Saturday	Sunday
Vika and Linda (Tonga / Australia); Leningrad Cowboys (Finland); Bangarra Dance Theatre (Australia); **Nusrat Fateh Ali Khan** (Pakistan)	Sunrize Band (Australia); Justin Vali; The Borderers (Australia); Archie Roach and Ruby Hunter (Australia); The Mutton Birds (NZ); Stella Chiwese (Zimbabwe); **Zap Mama** (Cameroon / Zaire)	Rough Image (Australia); Kashtan (Australia); Bad Boys Batucada (Australia / Brazil); Bangarra Dance Theatre (Australia); Mouth Music (Scotland); Justin Vali Trio; Sierra Maestra (Cuba); **Geoffrey Oryema**

=== The Tent ===
Friday	Saturday	Sunday
Slivanje (Australia); Utungan Percussion (Australia); Archie Roach and Ruby Hunter; **Yungchen Lhamo** (Tibet)	Slivanje (Australia); Kona-Lien (Chile / Australia); Hukwe Zawose (Tanzania); Yolgnu Dance Theatre (Australia); Martin and Porter (USA); Gesuino Deiana (Italy); **Salameh and Sridar** (Palestine / India)	Justin Vali Trio; Stella Chinese (Zimbabwe); Zap Mama (Cameroon / Zaire); Salameh and Sridar (Palestine / India); Tiddas (Australia); Rockin' Rembets (Australia / Greece); **Yungchen Lhamo** (Tibet)

== 1997 ==
February 28 - March 1st

=== Stage 1 ===
Friday	Saturday	Sunday
Guo Yi and Guo Yue (China); Shooglenifty (Scotland); **Midnight Oil** (Australia)	Terem Quartet (Russia); Well Oiled Sisters (Scotland); Bu Baca Diop (Senegal / Australia); Telek (Papa New Guinea); Radio Tarifa (Spain); Richard Thompson (UK); Salif Keita (Mali); **Christine Anu** (Australia)	Shooglenifty (Scotland); Tenores de Bitti (Italy); Afro Celt Sound System (UK / Ireland / Africa); Terem Quartet (Russia); Moana and the Moahunters (New Zealand); Fun-Da-Mental (UK / Pakistan); Paul Kelly (Australia); **Salif Keita** (Mali)

=== Stage 2 ===
Friday	Saturday	Sunday
Radio Tarifa (Spain); Wasi Ka Nanara Pan Pipers (Solomon Islands); Afro Celt Sound System (UK / Ireland / Africa); **Tenores de Bitti** (Italy)	Kev Carmody (Australia); The Backsliders; Bu Baca Diop (Senegal / Australia); Shikisha (South Africa); Shooglenifty (Scotland); Justin Vali Trio (Madagascar); Fun-Da-Mental (UK / Pakistan); Moana and the Moahunters (New Zealand); Misia (Portugal)	Lunar Drive (USA); Neil Murray and the Rainmakers (Australia); Well Oiled Sisters (Scotland); Richard Thompson (UK); Mara! (Australia); Loudon Wainwright III (USA); Telek (Papa New Guinea)

=== Stage 3 ===
Friday	Saturday	Sunday
Kev Carmody (Australia); FRUIT (Australia); **Andrea Rieniets** (Australia)	Tenores de Bitti (Italy); Loudon Wainright III (USA); Lunar Drive; Neil Murray and the Rainmakers (Australia); Heavenly Light Quartet (Australia); Wasi Ka Nanara Pan Pipers (Solomon Islands); **The Backsliders** (Australia)	The Borderers (Australia); Guo Yi and Guo Yue (China); Roman Hrynkiv (Ukraine); Justin Vali Trio; Dya Singh (India / Malaysia / Australia); Misia; **Bu Baca Diop** (Senegal / Australia)

=== The Tent ===
Friday	Saturday	Sunday
Yolngu Bungul (Australia); Kanyinda Makala (Zaire); **Roman Hrynkiv**	Stephen Hannigan: Uilean Pipe; Iarla O'Lionard and James McNally (Ireland); Guo Yi and Guo Yue (China); Colin Offord (Australia); Joji Hirota (Japan); Yolngu Bungul; Terem Quartet; **Lewis and Young** (Australia)	Simon Emmerson Workshop; Mara!; Yolngu Bungul; Sam Minkler (from Luna Drive): Storyteller; Heavenly Light Quartet; Lewis and Young; **Gesuino Deiana** (Italy)

=== Other venues ===
Venues in italic

Saturday	Sunday
Sheila Langeberg (Zimbabwe / Australia): Storytelling in Botanic Garden; Gamelan Sekar Laras: The Tree; Justin Vali Trio: The Tree; The Harmonic Singers: The Zoo	Shikisha (South Africa): Workshop at The Tree; Sheila Langeberg (Zimbabwe / Australia): Storytelling in Botanic Garden; Kanyinda Makala (Zaire): Workshop at The Tree; Joji Hirota: Workshop at The Tree; Other acts that appeared over the weekend: Adelaide Symphony Orchestra (Australia), Before You Were Blonde (Australia), Mornington Island Dancers

== 1999 ==
19th - 21st February

Music and dance stages (5 stages)	WO-Zone
Adelaide Symphony Orchestra (Australia); African Gypsies (South Africa); Ataru Taru Taiko (Japan/Australia); Baaba Maal (Senegal); Bangarra Dance Theatre (Australia); Cesar Stroscio and Esquinas (Argentina); Chris Finnen (Australia); Colin Hay (Australia); Dave Dobbyn (New Zealand); Master Drummers of Burundi (Burundi); Ernest Ranglin (Jamaica); Frank Yamma (Australia); FRUIT (Australia); The Gadflys (Australia); Gjallarhorn (Finland); Gospel Nation (Australia); Heather Frahn (Australia); Hung Phan (Vietnam/Australia); Jackie Leven (Scotland); Kaha (New Zealand/Australia); Karma County (Australia); Kila (Ireland); Las Perlas del Son (Cuba); Liam O'Flynn (Ireland); Lo'Jo (France); Los Gamberros (Australia); Men at Work (Australia); Monks of Sera Mey (Tibet); Mornington Island Dancers; Muszikas feat Marta Sebestyen (Hungary); Oliver Mtukudzi (Zimbabwe); Reuben Fast Horse (USA); Satori (Australia); Shiv Kumar Sharma (India); Sidewalk Tango (Australia); Slava Grigoryan (Australia); Te Vaka (New Zealand); Trilok Gurtu (India); Trochus (Australia); Tulipan (Australia); Whiplash (Australia); Xenos (Australia); Yair Dalal and the Al Ol Ensemble (Israel); Yungchen Lhamo (Tibet)	Agent 86; Bel; Ben Walsh and The Bird; Catalyst; Code; Forest; Ganga Giri; Klangen; Matt Pearce; Rautie; Re:incarnation; Sam g; Slim; Systa BB; Terence Towelling; White Sirens; Yusef Wilson III

== 2001 ==
March 7th-9th

Music and dance stages (5 stages)	WO-Zone
Adelaide Symphony Orchestra (Australia); Afro Celt Sound System (UK / Ireland / Africa); Anangu Pitjantatjara Inma artists (Australia); Barbara Luna (Argentina); The Benning Brothers (Australia); Bob Brozman (USA); Calo' Calo' (Spain / Australia); Carlos Nunez (Spain); Chava Alberstein (Israel); Chemirani Zarb Trio (Iran); Colors of Invention (France / USA); Csokolom (Netherlands); David Bridie (Australia); Djivan Gasparyan (Armenia); Dr Natesan Ramani (India); Eugenio Bennato and Musicanova (Italy); Flook! (Ireland); FourPlay String Quartet (Australia); FRUIT (Australia); Gilles Apap (France / USA); Gyuto Monks (Tibet); The Habibis (Australia); HUMAN NATURE – Craig Walsh (Australia); Iyer Brothers (India / Australia); Jimmy Little (Australia); John Butler Trio (Australia); Karma County (Australia); Liana Vargas Dancers (Australia); Meng Pichenda (Cambodia); Nabarlek (Australia); Nayima Hassan (Egypt / Australia); Oliver Mtukudzi and the Black Spirits (Zimbabwe); Paitya Dancers (Australia); Papa Wemba (Democratic Republic of Congo); Pato Banton and the Reggae Revolution (United Kingdom); Richard Thompson (United Kingdom); Riley Lee (Australia); Rokia Traore (Mali); Sierra Maestra (Cuba); Soukous Ba Congo (Australia); Soul Capoeira (Africa / Australia); Southern Cross Tango (Australia); Stiff Gins (Australia); TaikOz (Australia); Tananas (South Africa); Te Rama Nui (Cook Islands / SA); White Cockatoo Performing Group (Australia)	Ben Walsh and The Bird Collective (Australia); Bomba (Australia); Brazza and DJ El Papi (SA / Colombia); Bundi (Australia); DJ Akaash (India / Australia); DJ Derek (United Kingdom); D-Lux (Australia); Echelon (Australia); El Papi (Colombia); Frank Rodi (Australia); Incube (Australia); Jah Trinity Outer National Sound System (Australia); Juno (Australia); Karamel Shakespeare (Australia); Kim Dezen (Australia); Kristian (Australia); Marc 3.1 (Australia); Meg (Australia); Opsimath (Australia); Rah (Australia); Rautie (Australia); Rory (Ireland / Australia); Sam G (Australia); Shimmeeshok (Australia); Slim (Australia); Spolding (Australia); Systa BB (Australia); Terence Towelling (Australia); Tim Koch (Australia); Troy J Been (Australia)

== 2003 ==
March 7th-9th

=== Stage 1 ===
Friday	Saturday	Sunday
*Kaurna Welcome: Badenya les Freres Coulibaly (Burkina Faso); Rizwan-Muazzam Qawwali (Pakistan) with Temple of Sound (United Kingdom); **Los de Abajo (Mexico)**	*Drum Drum (Papa New Guinea / Fiji / Australia): Cara Dillon (Ireland); Amjad Ali Khan (India) with Mathew Barley (United Kingdom); Julien Jacob (Berlin / West Indies / France); Cheikh Lo (Senegal); **Rachid Taha (Algeria / France)**	Felpeyu (Spain); Toto La Momposina (Columbia); Cheikh Lo (Senegal); Ernest Ranglin (Jamaica); Los de Abajo (Mexico); **All-Star Festival Finale**

=== Stage 2 ===
Friday	Saturday	Sunday
Shooglenifty (Scotland / United Kingdom); Australian Dance Theatre (Australia); **Amjad Ali Khan (India)**	Andy White (Ireland); Toto La Momposina (Columbia); Anagu Pitjantjatjara Inma (Australia); The Waifs (Australia); Ernest Ranglin (Jamaica); La Volee d'Castors (Canada); Australian Dance Theatre (Australia); **Rizwan-Muazzam Qawwali (Pakistan)**	Bob Brozman and Takahashi Hirayasu (USA); Kerianne Cox (Australia); Julien Jacob (Berlin / West Indies / France); Badenya les Freres Coulibaly (Burkina Faso); Rachid Taha; **Temple of Sound (United Kingdom)**

=== Stage 3 ===
Friday	Saturday	Sunday
La Volee d'Castors (Canada); **Cara Dillon**	King Kadu (Australia); Apodimi Compania (Greece); Kerianne Cox (Australia); Bob Brozman and Takahashi Hirayasu (USA); Kavisha Mazzella (Australia); **Felpeyu (Spain)**	Keriba Wakai – CASM Choir (Australia); Zulya (Australia); King Kadu (Australia); iOTA (Australia); Apodimi Compania (Greece); **Drum Drum (Papa New Guinea / Fiji / Australia)**

=== Stage 4 ===
Friday	Saturday	Sunday
Bob Brozman and Takahashi Hirayasu (USA); Andy White (Ireland); **Mei Han and Randy Raine-Reusch (China / Canada)**	Amjad Ali Khan (India); Douglas Spotted Eagle (USA); Los de Abajo (Mexico); Cara Dillon; iOTA (Australia); **Toto La Momposina (Columbia)**	Cheikh Lo (Senegal); Madosini (South Africa); Kavisha Mazzella (Australia); Rizwan-Muazzam Qawwali (Pakistan); Zulya (Australia); **Mei Han and Randy Raine-Reusch (China / Canada)**

=== Stage 5 ===
Friday	Saturday	Sunday
The Waifs (Australia); **Zulya (Australia)**	Khalil Gudaz (Afghanistan / Australia); Madosini (South Africa); La Volee d'Castors (Canada); Liam Gerner (Australia); The Bloody Marys (Australia); **Papa Kwasi and the Iriehights (Australia)**	Julien Jacob (Berlin / West Indies / France); Badenya les Freres Coulibaly (Burkina Faso); Felpeyu (Spain); Columbian Brass; Salsa; **Madosini (South Africa)**

=== Stage 6 ===
Friday	Saturday	Sunday
The Bloody Marys (Australia); **Anagu Pitjantjatjara Inma (Australia)**	Anagu Pitjantjatjara Inma (Australia); Apodimi Compania (Greece); King Kadu (Australia); Drum Drum (Papa New Guinea / Fiji / Australia); **Mei Han and Randy Raine-Reusch (China / Canada)**	Gamelan Sekar Laras (Indonesia) with Ade Suharto; Gamelan Sekar Laras; **Khalil Gudaz (Afghanistan / Australia)**

=== WOZone ===
- The Bird Collective (Australia)
- bP aka Brendan Palmer (Australia)
- The Cat Empire (Australia)
- Dee Nasty (France)
- Deepchild (Australia)
- DJ Aah (UK / Australia)
- DJs Angelina and Systa BB (Australia)
- DJ Desperado (United Kingdom)
- DJ Gemma (Australia)
- Drum Drum (PNG / Fiji / Australia)
- Kim Dezen (Australia)
- Rah (Australia)
- Mobin Master aka Tribal Funk (Australia)
- Morganics and Elf Tranzporter, Brothablack and MC Wire (Australia)
- Sanjii (Australia)
- Systa BB (Australia)
- Temple Of Sound (UK)

== 2004 ==
March 5th-7th

=== Stage 1 ===
Friday	Saturday	Sunday
*Kaurna Welcome: Inti-Illimani (Chile); Youssou N'Dour and the Super Etoile de Dakar (Senegal); Oumou Sangare (Mali)	Leo; Souad Massi (Algeria / France); Eliza Carthy (United Kingdom); Tinariwen (Mali); **Gilberto Gil (Brazil)**	The Cat Empire (Australia); Savina Yannatou (Greece); Hamid Baroudi (Algeria); Kila (Ireland); **Youssou N'Dour and the Super Etoile de Dakar (Senegal)**

=== Stage 2 ===
Friday	Saturday	Sunday
Mary Coughlan (Ireland); Eliza Carthy (United Kingdom); **Zakir Hussein (India)**	Los Cabrones (Australia); Kila (Ireland); Hamid Baroudi (Algeria); Inti-Illimani (Chile); Abdullah Ibrahim Trio (South Africa); **Sultan Khan (India)**	Yilila (Australia); Abdullah Ibrahim Trio (South Africa); Oumou Sangare (Mali); All-Star Jam; **Tinariwen (Mali)**

=== Stage 3 ===
Friday	Saturday	Sunday
Leo; The Cat Empire (Australia); **Mark Atkins (ATSI, Australia)**	Monsieur Camembert (Australia); Yilila (Australia); Dirty Lucy (Australia); Waak Waak Jungi (Australia); **Savina Yannatou (Greece)**	Oki Kano and the Far East Band (Japan); Souad Massi (Algeria / France); Slava and Leonard Grigoryan (Australia); Xavier Rudd (Australia); **Los Cabrones (Australia)**]

=== Stage 4 ===
Friday	Saturday	Sunday
John Boden; Tinariwen (Mali); **Dirty Lucy (Australia)**	Eliza Carthy (United Kingdom); Waak Waak Jungi (Australia); Risnga Makondo; Kila (Ireland); **Oki Kano and the Far East Band (Japan)**	Mark Atkins (ATSI, Australia); Linsey Pollak; R Carlos Nakai (USA); Savina Yannatou (Greece); Sotho Sounds (Lesotho); **R Carlos Nakai (USA)**

=== Stage 5 ===
Friday	Saturday	Sunday
Oumou Sangare (Mali); **Oki Kano and the Far East Band (Japan)**	Abbie Cardwell (Australia); Slava and Leonard Grigoryan (Australia); Xavier Rudd (Australia); **Mark Atkins (ATSI, Australia)**	Joseph Tawadros (Egypt / Australia); Sultan Khan (India); Howie Summer (Australia); Waak Waak Jungi (Australia); **Monsieur Camembert (Australia)**

=== Stage 6 ===
Saturday	Sunday
Inti-Illimani (Chile); Sotho Sounds (Lesotho); Zakir Hussein (India); African Drumming; **Joseph Tawadros (Egypt / Australia)**	Hamid Baroudi (Algeria); Yilila (Australia); Sotho Sounds (Lesotho); *Dhol Intentions Crew (India / Australia) **Other Acts who played that weekend**: **Cie Carabosse (France), Les Hurelements d'Leo (France)**

=== WoZone ===
- Bill Fragos (Australia)
- Dhol Intentions Crew (India / Australia)
- DJ Desperado (Australia)
- DJ Dunks and Muskrat (Australia)
- DJ Russ Jones (United Kingdom)
- Hamid Baroudi (Algeria)
- Henri (Australia)
- Russ Jones (United Kingdom)
- Salmonella Dub (New Zealand)

== 2005 ==
March 4th-6th

=== Stage 1 ===
Friday	Saturday	Sunday
Kaurna Welcome; Zap Mama (Cameroon / Zaire); **Alpha Blondy and the Solar System (Cote d'lvoire)**	Pigram Brothers (Australia); Dulsori (South Korea); Capercaillie (Scotland, UK); Les Yeux Noirs (France); Ozomatli (USA); **Daara J (Senegal)**	George Rrurrambu and Birdwave (Australia); Lo'Jo (France); Richie Havens (USA); Not Drowning, Waving (Australia / Papa New Guinea); Capercaillie (Scotland, UK); **Ozomatli (USA)**

=== Stage 2 ===
Friday	Saturday	Sunday
Te Matarae I Orehu (New Zealand); Lo'Jo (France); **Ustad Rashid Khan (India)**	Yair Dalal and the Asmar Ensemble (Israel); Sally Ford and the Pachuco Playboys (Australia); Not Drowning, Waving (Australia / Papa New Guinea); Richie Havens (USA); Alpha Blondy and the Solar System (Cote d'lvoire); **Kronos Quartet (USA) with Tony MacMahon (Ireland)**	Te Matarae I Orehu (New Zealand); Les Yeux Noirs (France); Zap Mama (Cameroon / Zaire); All-Star Jam; **Dulsori (South Korea)**

=== Stage 3 ===
Friday	Saturday	Sunday
Yair Dalal and the Asmar Ensemble (Israel); **Café of the Gate of Salvation (Australia)**	Vusi Mahlasela (South Africa); Ustad Rashid Khan (India); Harper (Australia); George Rrurrambu and Bird-wave (Australia); **Mahinarangi Tocker (New Zealand)**	Nadya's 101 Candles Orkestra (Australia); Mahinarangi Tocker; Patrick Duff and Alex Lee (England, UK); Pigram Brothers (Australia); **Daara J**

=== The Zoo Stage (4) ===
Friday	Saturday	Sunday
Mahinarangi Tocker: Workshop; Adel Salameh Trio (Palestine / Algeria): Workshop; Jim Moray 4 (England, UK); **Les Yeux Noirs (France)**	George Rrurrambu and Bird-wave (Australia); Jim Moray (England, UK): workshop; Tony Mac Mahon (Ireland): workshop; Silvia Entcheva (Bulgaria / Australia): workshop; Ustad Rashid Khan (India): workshop	Michael Goldrick; Ozomatli (USA)" workshop; Jim Moray 4 (England, UK); Sally Ford and the Pachuco Playboys (Australia); Café of the Gate of Salvation]] (Australia); **Silvia Entcheva (Bulgaria / Australia)**

=== The Moreton Stage (5) ===
Friday	Saturday	Sunday
Silvia Entcheva (Bulgaria / Australia); Mia Dyson (Australia)	Nick Parnell Trio (Australia); Patrick Duff and Alex Lee (England, UK); Nadya's 101 Candles Orkestra (Australia); **Adel Salameh Trio (Palestine / Algeria)**	Jali Buba Kuyateh (Gambia); Adel Salameh Trio (Palestine / Algeria); Alpha Blondy: The Road To Reggae (in conversation); Harper (Australia); **Vusi Mahlasela (South Africa)**

=== The Dell (6) ===
Friday	Saturday	Sunday
The Audreys (Australia); Paitya Dance Group: workshop	Te Matarae I Orehu (New Zealand): workshop; Daara J and Zap Mama: workshop; Jali Buba Kuyateh (Gambia); Café of the Gate of Salvation]] (Australia); **Mia Dyson (Australia)**	Parade Musicians: workshop; Tony Mac Mahon (Ireland); Akhter Jahan (Bangladesh / Australia); Nadya's 101 Candles Orkestra (Australia): workshop

- Also played over the weekend: Cie Carabosse (France)

== 2006 ==
March 10th-12th

=== Music and dance (6 stages) ===
Friday	Saturday	Sunday
Miriam Makeba (South Africa); Jalsa Creole (Mauritius / Australia); Coco Mbassi (Cameroon): workshop; Gupapuygnu Dancers (Australia); Sharon Shannon and Friends (Ireland / England); LABJACD (Chile / Australia); Chakrini (Australia); Paul Kelly and The Stormwater Boys (Australia); Tommee and The Neighbourhood (Indonesia/Australia); Ravibandhu Vidyapathy and Ensemble (Sri Lanka): workshop; La Bottine Souriante (Canada); Briscoe Sisters (Australia); Dhol Foundation (India / UK); Chico Cesar (Brazil); Musafir Gypsies of Rajasthan (India): workshop; Dr L Subramaniam (India) and Amjad Ali Khan (India); Clare Bowditch and The Feeding Set (Australia)	Eitetsu Hayashi (Japan); Saltwater Band (Australia); DOCH (Australia); Sharon Shannon and Friends (Ireland / England): Farida and The Iraqi Maqam Ensemble (Iraq); Orchestra Baobab (Senegal): workshop; Gupapuygnu Dancers (Australia): workshop; Joe Camilleri and Nicky Bomba (Malta / Australia); Golden Pride Children's Choir (Tanzania); Kim Sanders Trio (Australia); Lura (Cape Verde); Amjad Ali Khan (India); La Bottine Souriante (Canada): workshop; Renegades Steel Orchestra (Trinidad and Tobago); Ravibandhu Vidyapathy and Ensemble (Sri Lanka); Nick Krieg (Australia); Musafir Gypsies of Rajasthan (India); Ba Cissoko (Guinea); Chico Cesar (Brazil); Wicked Aura Batucada (Singapore); Evelyn Glennie (Scotland, UK); Jeff Lang (Australia); La Bottine Souriante (Canada); Lura (Cape Verde); Orchestra Baobab (Senegal); Scrap Arts Music (Canada); Tommee and The Neighbourhood (Indonesia/Australia); Kanda Bongo Man (Democratic Republic of Congo); Coco Mbassi (Cameroon); Farida and The Iraqi Maqam Ensemble (Iraq); Sekar Budaya Nusantara (Indonesia); Talvin Singh (India/UK): DJ Set	Eitetsu Hayashi (Japan); Musafir Gypsies of Rajasthan (India); Evelyn Glennie (Scotland, UK); Renegades Steel Orchestra (Trinidad and Tobago); Jalsa Creole; Parade and Workshop featuring Wicked Aura Batucada (Singapore); Gupapuygnu Dancers (Australia); Dhol Foundation (India / UK); Ravibandhu Vidyapathy and Ensemble (Sri Lanka); Studio Flamenco; Saltwater Band (Australia); Clare Bowditch and The Feeding Set; Kim Sanders Trio (Australia): workshop; Farida and The Iraqi Maqam Ensemble (Iraq); Golden Pride Children's Choir; Chico Cesar (Brazil); Kanda Bongo Man (Democratic Republic of Congo); Coco Mbassi (Cameroon); Jalsa Creole: workshop; All-star band; Jeff Lang (Australia); Sekar Budaya Nusantara (Indonesia); Orchestra Baobab (Senegal): workshop; DOCH (Australia); Renegades Steel Orchestra (Trinidad and Tobago); Lura (Cape Verde); LABJACD (Chile / Australia); Briscoe Sisters (Australia); **Jimmy Cliff** (Jamaica); Ba Cissoko (Guinea); Kanda Bongo Man (Democratic Republic of Congo); Dalai Lama's Namgyal Monks (Tibet)

== 2007 ==
March 9th-11th

=== Stage 1 ===
Friday	Saturday	Sunday
Mahotella Queens (South Africa); Lunasa (Ireland); **Femi Kuti and the Positive Force** (Nigeria)	The Backsliders (Australia); Augie March (Australia); Fat Freddy's Drop (NZ); Habib Koite (Mali); Lila Downs (Mexico / USA); **Mariza** (Portugal)	Etran Finatawa (Niger); The Waifs (Australia); Mahotella Queens (South Africa); Asha Bhosle and Kronos Quartet featuring special guest Wu Man (India / USA / China); **Salif Keita** (Mali)

=== Stage 2 ===
Friday	Saturday	Sunday
Lila Downs (Mexico / USA); Gotan Project (France / Argentina); Shivkumar Sharma and Rahul Sharma (India)	SambaSunda (Indonesia); Blue King Brown (Australia); Lunasa (Ireland); Etran Finatawa (Niger); **The Waifs** (Australia)	San Lazaro (Australia); SambaSunda (Indonesia); Yasmin Levy (Israel); All-star jam; **Mariza** (Portugal)

=== Stage 3 ===
Friday	Saturday	Sunday
Blue King Brown (Australia); **Lior** (Australia)	Lior (Australia); Celenod (New Caledonia); Deborah Conway and Willy Zygier (Australia); San Lazaro (Australia); Bill Cobham (USA); **Guo Yue** (China)	Wu Man; Rebetiki (Greece / Australia); The Backsliders (Australia); **Augie March** (Australia)

=== Zoo Stage ===
Friday	Saturday	Sunday
Guo Yue (China); **Ensemble Shanbehzadeh** (Iran): workshop	Southern Cross Tango (Australia); Huun-Huur Tu (Tuva / Russia); Shivkumar Sharma and Rahul Sharma (India); Kev Carmody (Australia); **Yasmin Levy** (Israel)	WOMEN's VOICES: Emma Donovan Band (Australia), *Mahotella Queens (South Africa), Lila Downs (Mexico / USA) & Yasmin Levy (Israel); Ensemble Shanbehzadeh (Iran): workshop; Nganampa Music (Australia); Guo Yue (China); **Circle of Rhythm** (Australia)

=== Moreton Bay Stage ===
Friday	Saturday	Sunday
Circle of Rhythm (Australia); **Rebetiki** (Greece / Australia)	Lunasa (Ireland); Mornington Island Dancers (Australia): workshop; Ensemble Shanbehzadeh (Iran); Emma Donovan Band (Australia); **Sweet Baby James and Rob Eyers** (Australia)	Circle of Rhythm (Australia): workshop; Emily Davis and the Sunday Brides (Australia); Celenod; Deborah Conway and Willy Zygier (Australia); Mad Professor (UK)

*Mr Scruff (UK) also played this year, stage unknown

== 2008 ==
March 7th-9th

=== Stage 1 ===
Friday	Saturday	Sunday
Farafina (Burkina Faso); The John Butler Trio (Australia); **Mavis Staples** (USA)	Don McGlashan and the Seven Sisters (NZ); The Beautiful Girls (Australia); Terem Quartet (Russia); Susana Baca (Peru); Cesaria Evora (Cape Verde); **Toumani Diabate's Symmetric Orchestra** (Mali)	Tecoma (Australia); Toumani Diabate's Symmetric Orchestra (Mali); Taraf de Haidouks (Romania); David D'Or (Israel); **Cesaria Evora** (Cape Verde)

=== Stage 2 ===
Friday	Saturday	Sunday
Taraf de Haddocks (Romania); The Black Arm Band (Australia); **Kora** (NZ)	Farafina (Burkina Faso); Titi Robin Quintet (France); Clube do Balanco (Brazil); The John Butler Trio (Australia); **Black Grace** (NZ)	Susana Baca (Peru); Watussi (Australia); Billy Cobham Septet (USA); All-star gala; **Black Grace** (NZ)

=== Stage 3 ===
Friday	Saturday	Sunday
Beirut (USA / France); Clube do Balanco (Brazil); **Dr Natesan Ramani** (India)	Mista Savona (Australia); Joji Hirota Trio (Japan); Beirut (USA / France); Sarah Blasko (Australia); David D'Or (Israel); **Idan Raichel Project** (Israel)	Bob Evans (Australia); Sarah Blasko (Australia); The Beautiful Girls (Australia); Sharon Jones and the Dap-Kings (USA); **Tenzin Choegyal and the Tashi Lhunpo Monks of Tibet** (Tibet)

=== Zoo Stage ===
Friday	Saturday	Sunday
Joji Hirota Trio (Japan); Titi Robin Quintet (France); **Watussi**	Mojio Webb (Australia); Joseph Tawadros Trio (Egypt / Australia); Bob Evans; **Dr Natesan Romani** (India)	Tecoma; Master Kong Nay and Ouch Savy (Cambodia); Mamadou Diabate (Mali); Terem Quartet (Russia); **Mista Savon** (Australia)

=== Moreton Bay Stage ===
Friday	Saturday	Sunday
Martin Hayes and Dennis Cahill (Ireland); **Tenzin Choegyal** (Tibet)	Highway 31 (Australia); Telcoma; Kutcha Edwards (Australia); Martin Hayes and Dennis Cahill (Ireland); **Victor Valdes and the Real Mexico Mariachi Band** (Mexico / Australia)	Clube Du Balacao: workshop; Victor Valdes and the Real Mexico Mariachi Band (Mexico / Australia); Lowrider (Australia); Mojio Webb (Australia); **Joseph Tawadros Trio** (Egypt / Australia)

=== Speakers Corner ===
Friday	Saturday	Sunday
Terem Quartet (Russia): workshop; Toumani Diabate (Mali): in conversation; Pedson Kasume: workshop; Soul Jazz Sound System (UK); **Master Kong Nay & Ouch Savy**	Martin Hayes and Dennis Cahill (Ireland); Shane Howard & Kutch Edwards from The Black Arm Band: in conversation; Manjiri Kelkar (India); Susana Baca: in conversation; Farafina: workshop; Joji Hirota: in conversation; Joji Hirota Trio: workshop; Master Kong Nay: in conversation; Taraf de Haddocks (Romania) & Titi Robin Quintet (France): workshop; **Nickodemus** (USA)	Club Do Balanco: workshop; David D'Or (Israel): in conversation; Samba Parade Music & Dance workshops; Neil Ieremia from Black Grace: in conversation; Master Kong Nay & Ouch Savy: workshop; Billy Cobham: in conversation; Toumani Diabate (Mali): workshop; **Soul Jazz Sound System** (UK)

Stage unknown: *Cie Carabosse (France)

== 2009 ==
- Aaron Choulai, VADA and the Tatana Village Choir (PNG / Australia)
- Akoustic Odyssey (Australia)
- The Andi and George Band (Australia)
- Arte Kanela (Australia / Spain)
- The Audreys (Australia)
- Australian Dance Theatre "Zero-Sum" (Australia)
- Bedouin Jerry Can Band (Egypt)
- The Black Jesus Experience (Africa / NZ / Australia)
- The Cat Empire (Australia)
- Dan Sultan (Australia)
- Dengue Fever (USA / Cambodia)
- Dimi Mint Abba (Mauritanian)
- Dino Moran (South Africa)
- Dona Rosa and Ensemble (Portugal)
- Ego Lemnos (East Timor)
- Geoffrey Gurrumul Yunupingu (Australia)
- Justin Adams and Juldeh Camara Trio (UK / Gambia)
- Kaki King (USA)
- King Tide (Australia)
- Lo Cor de la Plana (France)
- Mark Atkins (Australia)
- Mihirangi (NZ)
- Mikidache (Mayotte)
- Natacha Atlas (Egypt / UK)
- Neil Finn (NZ)
- Paprika Balkanicus (Romania / Slovenia / Serbia)
- Rachel Unthank and the Winterset (UK)
- Redhead (Australia)
- Rokia Traore (Mali)
- Russ Jones, the Hackney Globetrotter (UK)
- Sa Dingding (China)
- Seckou Keita SKQ (Senegal / UK)
- Seun Kuti and Egypt 80 (Nigeria)
- Ska Cubano (Cuba / UK)
- Speed Caravan (Algeria / Paris)
- Tony Allen (Nigeria)
- U Shrinivas and U Rajesh (India)

== 2010 ==
- Amal Murkus (Israel)
- The Armada (Canada / Australia / Ireland)
- Arrebato Ensemble (Australia)
- Babylon Circus (France)
- The Bamboos (Australia)
- Besh o droM (Hungary)
- Calexico (USA)
- The Cholmondeleys and The Featherstonehaughs (UK)
- Dean and Britta (USA)
- Djan Djan (Mali / India / Australia)
- Dub Colossus (Ethiopia / UK)
- Eliades Ochoa (Cuba)
- Ethiopiques (Ethiopia / France)
- Frank Yamma (Australia)
- Fyah Walk (Australia)
- George Kamikawa and Noriko Tadano (Japan / Australia)
- DJ Gilles Peterson (UK)
- Gochag Askarov (Azerbaijan)
- Grrilla Step (Australia / Pacific)
- Hypnotic Brass Ensemble (USA)
- Jane Siberry (Canada)
- Kamel el Harrachi (Algeria/France)
- Kathakali Dance Ensemble (India)
- LAFA and Artists Dance Company (Taiwan)
- Lepisto and Lehti (Finland)
- Los Amigos Invisibles (Venezuela)
- Mairtin O'Connor Trio (Ireland)
- Mama Kin (Australia)
- Mariem Hassan (Western Sahara)
- Monkey Puzzle Tree (Australia)
- Nickodemus (USA)
- Nortec Collective presents: Bostich and Fussible (Mexico)
- Ojos de Brujo (Spain)
- The Public Opinion Afro Orchestra (Australia)
- Ravi Shankar and Anoushka Shankar (India)
- Ray Lee's "Siren" (UK)
- Ross Daly Ensemble (Greece)
- Shellie Morris (Australia)
- The Skatalites (Jamaica)
- Tim Finn (NZ)
- Transe Express (France)
- Tutti Ensemble (Australia)
- Unified Gecko (Turkey / Australia)
- Vorn Doolette (Australia)
- VulgarGrad (Australia)
- Xavier Rudd and Izintaba (Australia)
- Yamato, The Drummers of Japan (Japan)

== 2011 ==
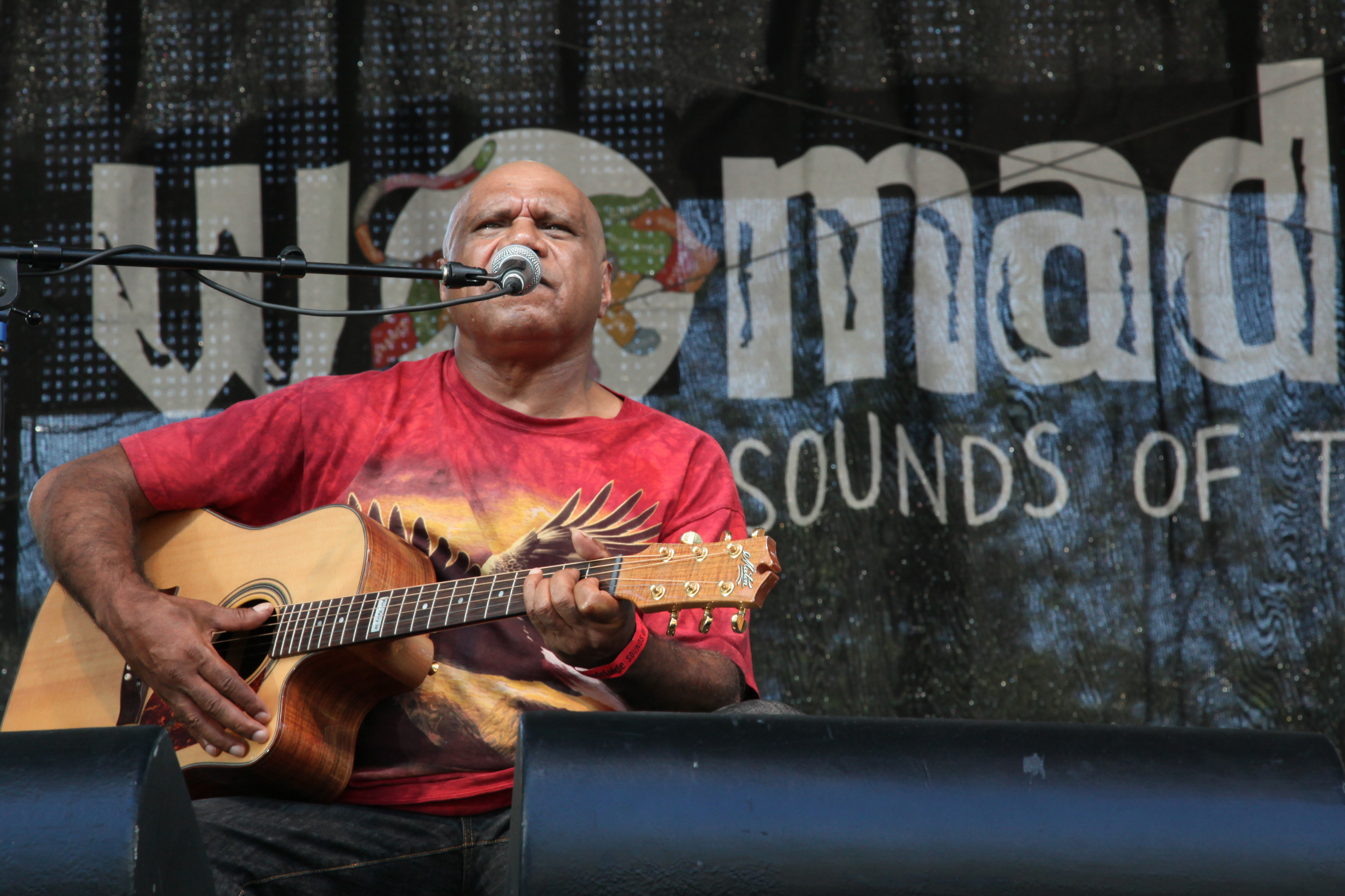
Archie Roach performing at WOMADelaide 2011

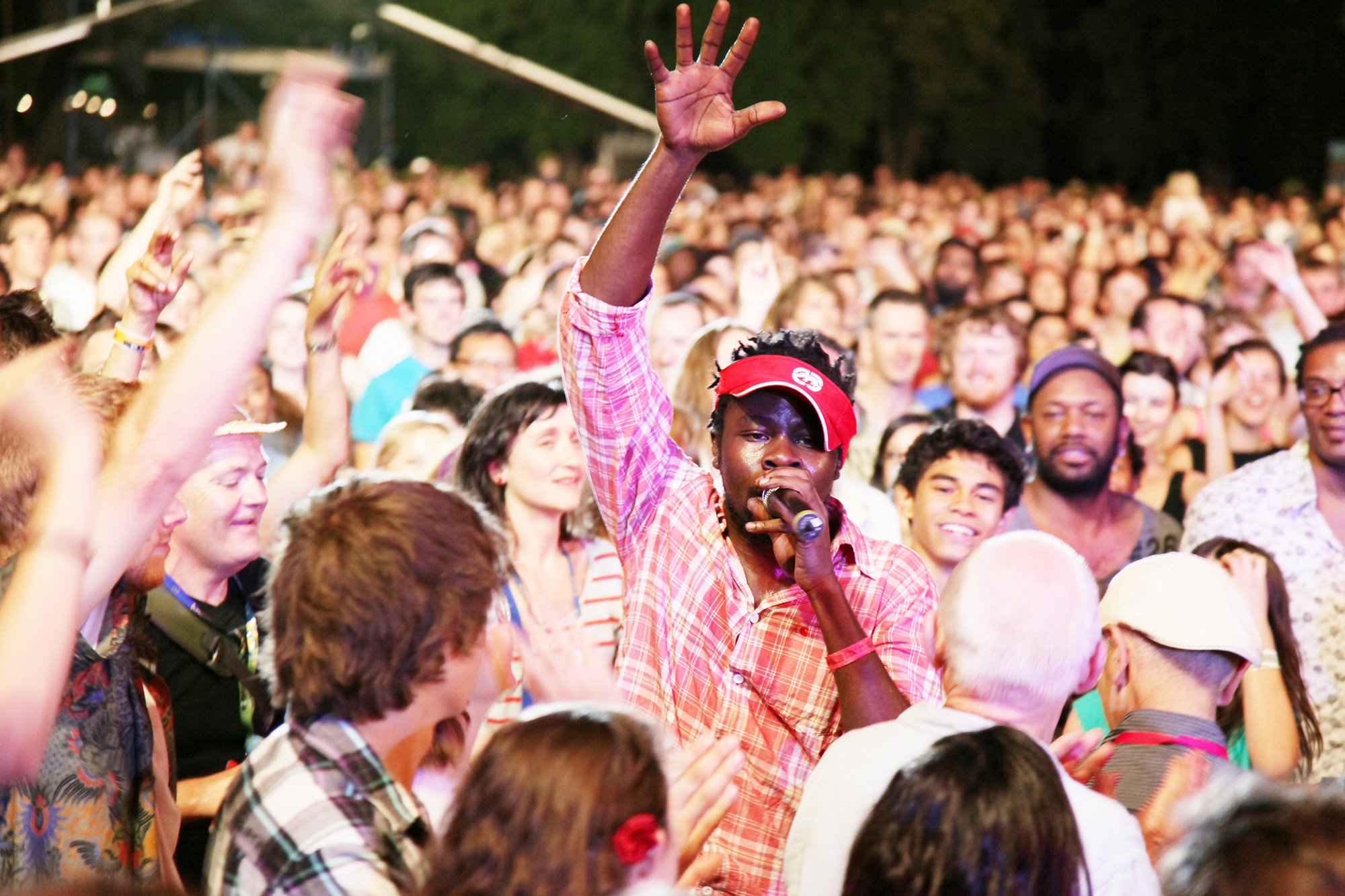
Féfé performing at WOMADelaide 2011

Music and Dance:

- 17 Hippies (Germany)
- Adam Page (Australia)
- Afro Celt Sound System (UK)
- Afro Mandinko (Australia / Senegal / Gambia)
- Alan Kelly Quartet (Ireland)
- Amadou and Mariam (Mali)
- Ana Moura (Portugal)
- Angus and Julia Stone (Australia)
- Archie Roach (Australia)
- Asa (Nigeria / France)
- Ash Grunwald (Australia)
- Band of Brothers (Australia)
- Bob Brozman (USA)
- Caliente Guitar Trio (Australia)
- Calypso Rose (Trinidad and Tobago)
- Creole Choir of Cuba (Cuba)
- DakhaBrakha (Ukraine)
- Dereb The Ambassador (Ethiopia / Australia)
- Don Letts (UK)
- Dubmarine (Australia)
- Faiz Ali Faiz (Pakistan)
- Fefe (France)
- The Gadflys (Australia)
- Hanggai (China)
- Horace Andy and Dub Asante (Jamaica / UK)
- Imelda May (Ireland)
- Joanna Newsom (USA)
- Juan De Marcos Afro-Cuban All Stars (Cuba)
- Leah Flanagan (Australia)
- Leigh Warren and Dancers (Australia)
- Luka Bloom (Ireland)
- Marshall McGuire (Australia)
- Martha Wainwright (Canada)
- Nathalie Natiembe (Reunion)
- The Necks (Australia)
- Nitin Sawhney (UK)
- Norman Jay (UK)
- Omar Souleyman (Syria)
- Os Mutantes (Brazil)
- Rajendra Prasanna (India)
- Rango (Egypt / Sudan)
- Rhombus with Michael Tuffery (New Zealand)
- ScrapArts Music (Canada)
- The Shaolin Afronauts (Australia)
- Sidestepper (Colombia / UK)
- Space Invadas (Australia / UK)
- Tanya Tagaq (Canada)
- Tim O'Brien Two Oceans Trio (USA / NZ / Ireland)
- Whitireia Performing Arts (New Zealand)
- Wildbirds and Peacedrums with Voices (Sweden)
- The Woohoo Revue (Australia)
- The Yabu Band (Australia)
- Yasar Akpence HAREM'DE (Turkey)

Around The Park:

- Compagnie Ekart - "Not So Beastly" and "Maurice and Jules" (France)
- Flags of the APY Lands - "Tjukurpa Mulapa Tjukaritja" (Australia)
- Gracie Spoon - "The Tiger's Bride" (France)
- Huri Duna Dancers (Papua New Guinea)
- Le Phun - "Les Gûmes" (France)
- murundak: Songs of Freedom (Australia)
- Roundabout Theatre Company - "The Slow Show" (Australia)
- Tawdry Heartburn's Manic Cures (Australia)

KidZone:

- Adelaide Face Painters
- The Amazing Drumming Monkeys
- Nico and Martin's Instant Orchestra
- Evelyn Roth's Nylon Zoo
- Whitireia Performing Arts

== 2012 ==
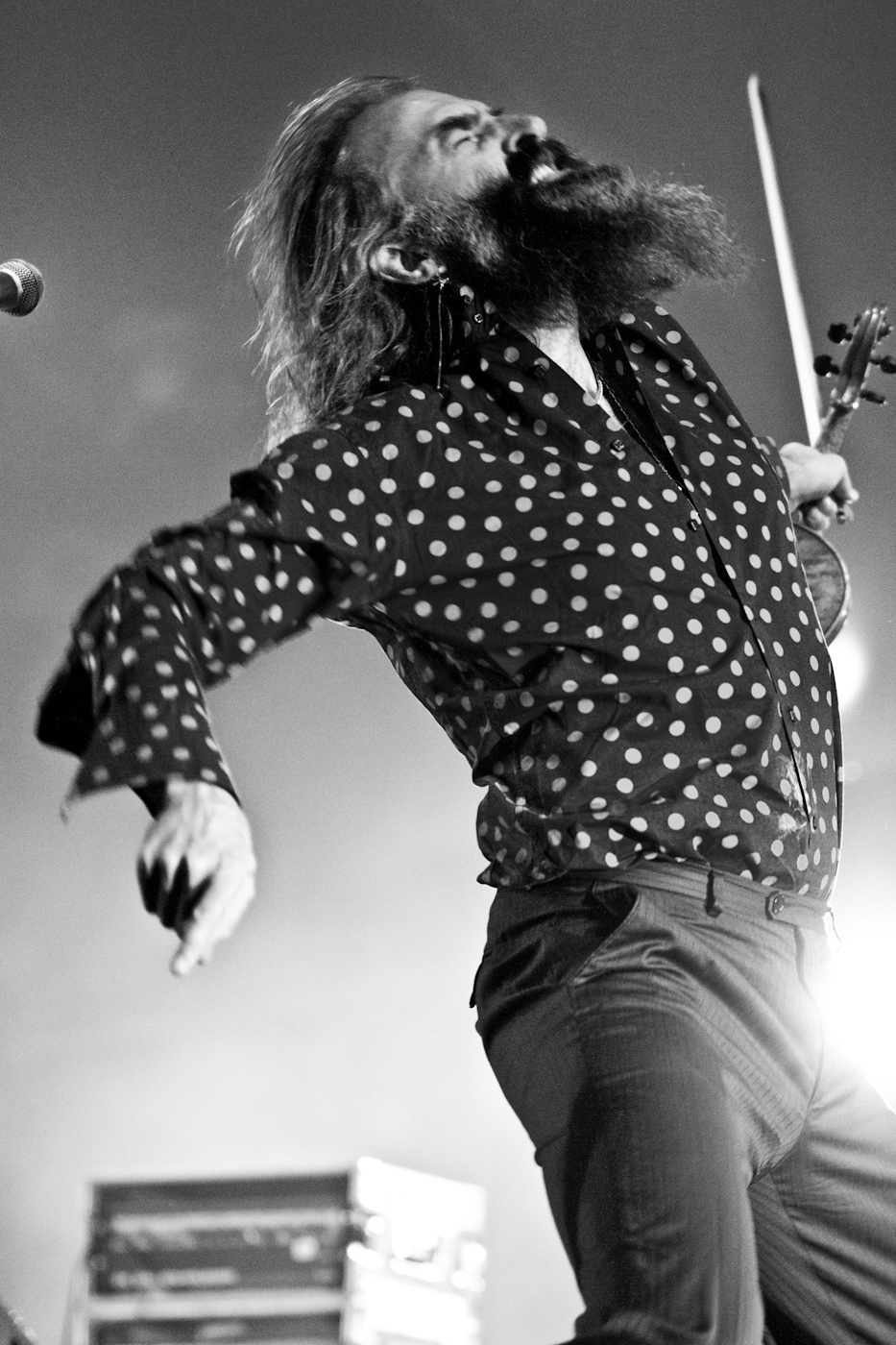
Warren Ellis of the Dirty Threeperforming at WOMADelaide 2012

Music and Dance:

- Anda Union (China)
- Baaba Maal (Senegal)
- The Barons of Tang (Australia)
- The Bearded Gypsy Band (Australia)
- Blue King Brown (Australia)
- The Bombay Royale (Australia)
- Bonobo (UK)
- Bunna Lawrie (Australia)
- Cambodian Space Project (Cambodia/France/Australia)
- Chapelier Fou (France)
- Chic (USA)
- Chris Finnen (Australia)
- Diego Guerrero y El Solar de Artistas (Spain)
- Dirty Three (Australia)
- DJ Jumps (Australia)
- DJ Krush (Japan)
- Dobet Gnahoré (Ivory Coast)
- Eddi Reader (Scotland)
- Electric Wire Hustle (New Zealand)
- First Aid Kit (Sweden)
- Frigg (Finland/Norway)
- Grace Barbé (Seychelles/Australia)
- Groundation (Jamaica/USA)
- Gurrumul (Australia)
- Jay Hoad Band (Australia)
- Jinja Safari (Australia)
- Joe Bataan and the I Like it Like That Orchestra (Philippines/USA/Australia)
- Johnny Clegg (South Africa)
- Kimmo Pohjonen (Finland)
- La Voce Della Luna (Australia)
- Le Trio Joubran (Palestine)
- Lo'Jo (France)
- Mad Professor (UK)
- Mahala Rai Banda (Romania)
- Master Drummers of Burundi (Burundi)
- Melbourne Ska Orchestra (Australia)
- Mo' Horizons (Germany)
- Nano Stern and The Sindicato (Chile)
- Narasirato (Solomon Islands)
- Pajama Club (New Zealand)
- Pascals (Japan)
- Penguin Café (UK)
- Picture Box Orchestra (Australia/UK/Pakistan)
- The Pigram Brothers (Australia)
- Ponydance Theatre Company (Ireland)
- Shane Howard (Australia)
- Shantala Shivalingappa (India)
- Sharon Shannon Big Band (Ireland)
- Shivkumar Sharma (India)
- Staff Benda Bilili (Democratic Republic of Congo)
- Sundog (UK)
- Tenzin Choegyal and Monks of Tibet (Tibet/Australia)
- Tété (Senegal/France)
- Tinariwen (Mali)
- Toninho Ferragutti and Bebê Kramer (Brazil)
- TORI Ensemble (Korea)
- Two Pianos - "Canto Ostinato by Simeon Ten Holt" (Australia)
- Ukulele Orchestra of Great Britain (UK)

Around The Park

- Amanda King - Parade Workshops
- Da Klinic
- Gramophone Man
- Rebound
- Sivouplait (Japan)
- The Amazing Drumming Monkeys
- The Pitts Family Circus
- Weaving the World (Tibet/Australia)

== 2013 ==
Music and Dance:

- Abigail Washburn and Kai Welch (USA)
- Adnaan Baraky (Syria / Australia)
- The Alaev Family (Tajikistan / Israel)
- Alim Qasimov Ensemble (Azerbaijan)
- Amparo Sanchez (Spain)
- Antibalas (USA)
- Arpaka Dance Company (Australia)
- Ayarkhaan (Russia)
- Bassekou Kouyate and Ngoni Ba (Mali)
- The Bird (Australia)
- The Cat Empire (Australia)
- Christine Salem (Reunion)
- Clairy Browne and The Bangin' Rackettes (Australia)
- Circolombia (Colombia)
- The Correspondents (UK)
- Dhafer Youssef (Tunisia)
- Dj ClicK (France)
- DJ Tr!p (Australia)
- East Journey (Australia)
- Golonka (Australia)
- Goran Bregovic and His Weddings and Funerals Orchestra (Serbia)
- Heather Frahn and the Moonlight Tide (Australia)
- The Herbaliser (UK)
- The Herd (Australia)
- Hugh Masekela (South Africa)
- Hugo Mendez (UK)
- Illapu (Chile)
- Jimmy Cliff (Jamaica)
- Jordi Savall (Spain)
- Kingfisha (Australia)
- LA-33 (Colombia)
- LAU (Scotland)
- Manjiri Kelkar (India)
- Mara! and Martenitsa Choir (Australia)
- Mari Boine (Norway)
- Mia Dyson (Australia)
- Moriarty (France)
- Nidi d'Arac (Italy)
- Novalima (Peru)
- Oisima (Australia)
- Paul Ubana-Jones (UK / Nigeria / NZ)
- Psarantonis (Greece)
- Salif Keita (Mali)
- Sanso-xtro (Australia)
- Savoy Family Cajun Band (USA)
- Seth Lakeman (UK)
- Shunsuke Kimura and Etsuro Ono (Japan)
- Sing Sing (Australasia)
- Souad Massi (Algeria / France)
- Soweto Gospel Choir (South Africa)
- Sudha Ragunathan (India)
- Swamp Thing (New Zealand)
- The Tallest Man on Earth (Sweden)
- Tim Koch (Australia)
- Tim Rogers and the Bamboos (Australia)
- Tuba Skinny (USA)
- Tubular Bells for Two (Australia)
- Vieux Farka Toure (Mali)
- The Volatinsky Trio (Russia / Australia)
- Zoe Keating (USA)

Around The Park

- Barnaby Gibbons - "Charlie O'Taney, The Brooklyn Healer" (UK)
- Compagnie L'Elephant Vert – "Man's Best Friend" (France)
- Compagnie Luc Amoros – "Blank Page" (France)
- Macnas – "The Boy Explorer" (Ireland)
- Ringbalin – "River Stories" (Australia)

The Planet Talks

- Anna Rose
- Bernie Hobbs
- Prof Corey Bradshaw
- Costa Georgiadis
- Dr Dana Cordell
- Giles Parkinson
- Graham Brookman
- Dr Graham Turner
- Prof Ian Lowe
- Michael Yeo
- Miranda Gibson
- Paul Ralph Ehrlich
- Prof Randy Stringer
- Robyn Williams
- Ronni Kahn
- Simon Bryant
- Urthboy

KidZone

- Bowerbird - "Flutter"
- Boxwars: The Art of Destruction
- Carclew Youth Arts
- Polyglot Theatre - "Tangle"
- SA Museum Explorers' Tent

== 2014 ==
Music and Dance:

- Ade Suharto and Peni Candra Rini "Ontosoroh" (Indonesia / Australia)
- Airileke (PNG / Australia)
- Ane Brun (Sweden / Norway)
- Antonio Serrano (Spain)
- Arrested Development (USA)
- Asif Ali Khan (Pakistan)
- Awesome Tapes from Africa (USA)
- Azadoota (Iraq / Australia)
- Baby et Lulu (Australia)
- The Baker Suite (Australia)
- Balanescu Quartet (UK)
- Billy Bragg (UK)
- Breabach (Scotland)
- The Brown Hornet (Australia)
- Buika (Guinea / Spain / USA)
- Carminho (Portugal)
- Coloured Stone (Australia)
- Danyel Waro (Reunion)
- DJ Yoda (UK)
- Dub Inc (France)
- Emel Mathlouthi (Tunisia)
- Fat Freddy's Drop (New Zealand)
- Femi Kuti and the Positive Force (Nigeria)
- Hanggai (China)
- Hiatus Kaiyote (Australia)
- Jeff Lang (Australia)
- Jon Cleary and the Absolute Monster Gentlemen (UK / USA)
- Kutcha Edwards (Australia)
- La Chiva Gantiva (Colombia / Belgium)
- Les Gitans Blanc (Australia)
- Lior (Australia)
- Living Room (Australia)
- Loren Kate (Australia)
- Los Coronas (Spain)
- Makana (USA)
- Megan Washington (Australia)
- Mehr Ensemble (Iran / Australia)
- Menagerie (Australia)
- Mikhael Paskalev (Norway / Bulgaria)
- Mokoomba (Zimbabwe)
- Muro (Japan)
- Neko Case (USA)
- Ngaiire (Australia)
- No Birds (Australia)
- Oddessa (Australia)
- Osaka Monaurail (Japan)
- Pokey LaFarge (USA)
- Quantic [DJ set] (UK)
- Question Question (Australia)
- Rachid Taha (Algeria)
- Red Baraat (USA)
- Roberto Fonseca (Cuba)
- Sam Lee and Friends (UK)
- Saskwatch (Australia)
- Shanren (China)
- Sitara (Australia)
- Thelma Plum (Australia)
- Tinpan Orange (Australia)

Around The Park

- Cie Fracasse de 12 - "HOP!" (France)
- Cocoloco - "Madame Bonbon" (UK)
- David Michalek's - "Slow Dancing" (USA)
- Mallakhamb Gymnasts (India)
- Roundabout Theatre Company (Australia)

The Planet Talks

- Amie Albrecht
- Annabel Crabb
- Professor Chris Davies
- Paul Gilding
- Peter Garrett
- Peter Owen
- Peter Ward
- Polly Higgins
- Dr Richard Slaughter
- Simon Sheikh
- Simon Holmes à Court
- Dr Steffen Lehmann
- Tanya Ha
- Tim Flannery
- Tim Hollo
- Professor Tom Wigley
- Tory Shepherd

KidZone

- Bowerbird (Amanda King) - Viva la Vida Parade and Workshops
- Boxwars - The Art of Destruction
- Carclew Youth Arts
- Evelyn Roth's Nylon Zoo
- Polyglot Theatre - "Ants"
- SA Museum Explorers' Tent
- The Imagination Playground

== 2015 ==
Music and Dance

- Abdullah Ibrahim Quartet (South Africa)
- Astronomy Class feat. Srey Channthy (Australia)
- Balkan Beat Box (USA / Israel)
- Bärra w/ Djalu Gurruwiwi and Gotye (Australia)
- Bombino (Niger)
- Brokers (Australia)
- Buffy Saint-Marie (Canada)
- Canzoniere Grecanico Salentino (Italy)
- Charlie Musselwhite (USA)
- Che Sudaka (Argentina / Columbia / Spain)
- Criolo (Brazil)
- CW Stoneking (feat. Vika and Linda Bull) (Australia)
- Depedro (Spain)
- DJ Spooky (USA)
- Emma Donovan and The PutBacks (Australia)
- Fanfare Ciocarlia (Romania)
- First Aid Kit (Sweden)
- Flavia Coelho (Brazil)
- Fourplay (Australia)
- Gordie MacKeeman and His Rhythm Boys (Canada)
- Gruff Rhys (UK - Wales)
- Hi Top Brass Band (Australia)
- How Green (Australia)
- Invisible Cities DJs (Canada)
- Jambinai (South Korea)
- Julia Henning (Australia)
- Jupiter and Okwess International (Democratic Republic of Congo)
- Kamerunga (Australia)
- Lake Street Dive (USA)
- Live Live Cinema (New Zealand)
- Luzmila Carpio (Bolivia)
- Malawi Mouse Boys (Malawi)
- Margaret Leng Tan (Singapore / USA)
- Marrugeku - Cut the Sky (Australia)
- Max Savage (Australia)
- Meeta Pandit (India)
- Mista Savona w/ guests Prince Alla and Randy Valentine (Australia / Jamaica / UK)
- Myele Manzanza and the Eclectic (New Zealand)
- Neneh Cherry with Rocketnumbernine (Sweden / UK)
- Nick Waterhouse (USA)
- Orquesta Buena Vista Social Club (Cuba)
- Public Service Broadcasting (UK)
- Ramzi Aburedwan and Ensemble Dal 'Ouna (Palestine)
- Robert Forster w/ Jherek Bishoff and the Zephyr Quartet (Australia / USA)
- Robyn Hitchcock and Emma Swift (UK / Australia)
- Rufus Wainwright (Canada)
- Sebastian Vivian (Australia)
- Sharon Van Etten (USA)
- Sinéad O'Connor (Ireland)
- Soil and "Pimp" Sessions (Japan)
- Sóley (Iceland)
- Tara Tiba (Iran / Australia)
- The Gloaming (Ireland)
- The Painted Ladies (Australia)
- Theo Parish (USA)
- Timberwolf (Australia)
- Tjintu Desert Band (Australia)
- Toumani and Sidiki Diabate (Mali)
- Typhoon 台风 (China / Australia / USA)
- Urtekk (Australia)
- Willow Beats (Australia)
- Youssou N'Dour (Senegal)

Around The Park

- Architects of Air – "Exxopolis" (UK)
- Artonik - "The Colour of Time" (France)
- Hammocktime (Australia)
- Mr Culbuto (France)
- Osadia (Spain)

The Planet Talks

- Andrew Denton (Australia)
- Bob Brown (Australia)
- Bronwyn Gillanders (Australia)
- Cecilia Woodford (Australia)
- Charlie Veron (Australia)
- Emily Johnston (USA)
- Hannah Gadsby (Australia)
- Ingo Weber (Australia)
- Paul Sutton (Australia)
- Paul Willis (Australia)
- Peter Langridge (Australia)
- Rod Quantock (Australia)
- Simran Sethi (USA)
- Sylvia Earle (USA)
- Tim Jarvis (Australia)
- Vandana Shiva (India)

KidZone

- Andy Griffiths
- Carclew
- Evelyn Roth's Nylon Zoo
- James Berlyn's "Dreamstore"
- SA Museum Explorers' Tent

== 2016 ==
Music and Dance

- 47SOUL (Palestine / Syria / Jordan)
- Ainslie Wills (Australia)
- Ajak Kwai (Sudan / Australia)
- All Our Exes Live in Texas (Australia)
- Alpine (Australia)
- Alsarah and the Nubatones (Sudan / USA)
- Angelique Kidjo (Benin) and the Adelaide Symphony Orchestra (Australia)
- APY Choir (Australia)
- Asha Bhosle (India)
- Asian Dub Foundation (UK)
- Australian Dance Theatre "The Beginning of Nature" (Australia)
- Calexico (USA)
- Cedric Burnside Project (USA)
- Cirque Alfonse (Canada)
- DakhaBrakha (Ukraine)
- Datakae (Australia)
- De La Soul (USA)
- Debashish Bhattacharya (India)
- Diego el Cigala (Spain)
- Djuki Mala (Australia)
- Edmar Castañeda Trio (Colombia / USA)
- Eska (UK)
- Ester Rada (Ethiopia / Israel)
- Hazmat Modine (USA)
- Husky (Australia)
- Ibeyi (Cuba / France)
- John Grant (USA)
- Kev Carmody (Australia)
- Ladysmith Black Mambazo (South Africa)
- Mahsa and Marjan Vahdat (Iran)
- Marcellus Pittman (USA)
- Marlon Williams and the Yarra Benders (NZ / Australia)
- Miles Cleret (UK)
- Mojo Juju (Australia)
- Mortisville vs The Chief (Australia)
- Mountain Mocha Kilimanjaro (Japan)
- NO ZU (Australia)
- Orange Blossom (France / Egypt)
- Osunlade (USA)
- Problems (Australia)
- Quarter Street (Australia)
- Radical Son (Tonga / Australia)
- Ripley (Australia)
- Sadar Bahar (USA)
- Sampa the Great (Zambia / Australia)
- Sarah Blasko (Australia)
- Savina Yannatou and Primavera en Salonico (Greece)
- Seun Kuti and Egypt 80 (Nigeria)
- Songhoy Blues (Mali)
- Spiro (UK)
- St Germain (France)
- Surahn (Australia)
- Tek Tek Ensemble (Australia)
- The Cat Empire (Australia)
- The Jerry Cans (Canada)
- The Once (Canada)
- The Spooky Men's Chorale (Australia)
- The Strides (Australia)
- Tulegur (China)
- Violent Femmes (USA)
- Wasted Wanderers (Australia)
- Zeequil (Australia)
- 숨[su:m] (South Korea)

Around The Park

- Acrojou "The Wheel House" (UK)
- Fair Play Comedy "Fairly Fresh Fish Company" (UK)
- Jeremy Deller's "Sacrilege" (UK)
- The Miraculous Theatre Company "Romantic Botanic" (UK)

The Planet Talks

- Amelia Telford (Australia)
- Daniel Spencer (Australia)
- David Suzuki (Canada)
- Dee Madigan (Australia)
- Dr Karl Kruszelnicki (Australia)
- Felicia Whiting (Australia)
- First Dog on The Moon (Australia)
- Indira Naidoo (Australia)
- Jane Caro (Australia)
- John Hewson (Australia)
- Lenore Taylor (Australia)
- Naomi Oreskes (USA)
- Paul Willis (Australia)
- Robyn Williams (Australia)
- Ross Garnaut (Australia)
- Simon Hackett (Australia)
- Tanya Monro (Australia)
- Tory Shepherd (Australia)

KidZone

- Carclew
- Dr Karl Kruszelnicki
- Evelyn Roth's Nylon Zoo
- Maybe ( ) Together - "The Future Postal Service"
- SA Museum Explorers' Tent

== 2017 ==
Music and Dance

- 30/70 (Australia)
- 9Bach (Wales)
- Aaron Thomas (Australia)
- A. B. Original (Australia)
- A Guy Called Gerald (UK)
- Alma Flamenca (Australia)
- Ana Tijoux (Chile)
- Archie Roach w/ Uncle Jack Charles (Australia)
- Aurelio (Honduras)
- Aziza Brahim (Western Sahara / Spain)
- Baba Zula (Turkey)
- Bamba Wassoulou Groove (Mali)
- Bebel Gilberto (Brazil)
- Bokanté (USA)
- Brushy One String (Jamaica)
- Caiti Baker (Australia)
- Dancenorth, Lucy Guerin Inc and Senyawa - "Attractor" (Australia / Indonesia)
- D. D. Dumbo (Australia)
- Dope Lemon (Australia)
- The East Pointers (Canada)
- EkosDance Company - "Cry Jailolo" (Indonesia)
- Electric Fields (Australia)
- Emir Kusturica and the No Smoking Orchestra (Serbia)
- FLAMINGO (Australia)
- Fuel Fandango (Spain)
- Gawurra (Australia)
- Hanoi Masters (Vietnam)
- Hemingstein (Australia)
- The Hot 8 Brass Band (USA)
- Inna Modja (Mali)
- Jesse Davidson (Australia)
- Joy and Sparks (Australia)
- Kelly Menhennett (Australia)
- Kiasmos (Iceland)
- L-FRESH the LION (Australia)
- La Bomba: Afro-Latino Dance (Australia)
- La Mambanegra (Colombia)
- Lamine Sonko and the African Intelligence (Senegal / Australia)
- MANE (Australia)
- The Manganiyar Classroom (India)
- Mercedes Peón (Spain)
- Montaigne (Australia)
- Nattali Rize (Jamaica / Australia)
- Nhatty Man and Gara (Ethiopia / Australia)
- Oki Dub Ainu Band (Japan)
- Orquesta Tipica Fernandez Fierro (Argentina)
- Oumou Sangaré (Mali)
- Parov Stelar (Austria)
- Philip Glass Ensemble "KOYAANISQATSI" LIVE! - Life out of Balance (USA)
- The Piyut Ensemble (Israel)
- Rahaan (USA)
- Rich Medina (USA)
- Senyawa (Indonesia)
- Sinkane (Sudan/USA)
- Skratch Bastid (Canada)
- The Soil (South Africa)
- The Specials (UK)
- Sudha Ragunathan (India)
- TAGO (South Korea)
- Tangents (Australia)
- Toni Childs (USA / Australia)
- Uncle Jack Charles (Australia)
- The Waifs (Australia)
- Warsaw Village Band (Poland)
- William Crighton (Australia)
- Xanga (Australia)
- Xylouris White (Greece / Australia)

Around The Park

- AES+F (Russia)
- Astrid Mendez (Chile / Australia)
- Cie Carabosse (France)
- Cie Ekhart (France)
- Les Goulus (France)
- Sans Compagnie Fixe (France)
- Tyrone Sheather (Australia)
- [big] String (Australia)

The Planet Talks

- Carmel Johnston (USA)
- Erin Rhoads (Australia)
- Father Bob Maguire (Australia)
- Fiona Walsh (Australia)
- Jon Dee (Australia)
- Josh Richards (Australia)
- Karen O'Brien (Norway)
- Kyle Wiens (USA)
- Lewis Yerloburka (Australia)
- Miriam Corowa (Australia)
- Nicholas Chileshe (Australia)
- Philippa Rowland (Australia)
- Prof Mohamad Abdalla (Australia)
- Rabbi Jonathan Keren-Black (Australia)
- Richard Fidler (Australia)
- Robyn Williams (Australia)
- Sir Tim Smit (UK)
- Sonya Feldhoff (Australia)
- Vanessa Morrish (Australia)
- Veena Sahajwalla (Australia)
- Veronica Perrurle Dobson (Australia)
- Zaachariaha Fielding (Australia)

KidZone

- Carclew
- Evelyn Roth's Nylon Zoo
- Allan Sumner - Kaurna and Ngarrindjeri Stories
- Mem Fox
- The Nature Village
- SA Museum Explorers' Tent
- Adelaide City Libraries Bedtime Stories

== 2018 ==
Music and Dance

- a Bit na Ta (PNG)
- Abbey Howlett (Australia)
- Adrian Sherwood (UK)
- Anoushka Shankar (India / UK)
- The Avalanches (Australia)
- Baker Boy (Australia)
- Bashka (Turkey / Australia)
- Bedouine (USA / Syria)
- Bixiga 70 (Brazil)
- Blick Bassy (Cameroon / France)
- Chico Trujillo (Chile)
- Constantinople and Ablaye Cissoko (Canada / Iran / Senegal)
- Dan Sultan (Australia)
- Daymé Arocena (Cuba)
- Deborah Conway and Willy Zygier (Australia)
- Didirri (Australia)
- DJ Marky (Brazil)
- Dustyesky (Australia)
- Elephant Sessions (Scotland)
- Eva Quartet (Bulgaria)
- Ghada Shbeir (Lebanon)
- Gogol Bordello (USA)
- Hana and Jessie-Lee's Bad Habits (Australia)
- Hartway (Australia)
- Hat Fitz and Cara (Ireland / Australia)
- Havana Meets Kingston (Cuba / Jamaica)
- Hypnotic Brass Ensemble (USA)
- Jazz Party (Australia)
- Jojo Abot (Ghana)
- Kamasi Washington (USA)
- Kings and Associates (Australia)
- Le Vent du Nord (Canada)
- Lonelyspeck (Australia)
- Lura (Cape Verde)
- Mama Kin Spender (Australia)
- The Manganiyar Seduction (India)
- Mission Songs Project (Australia)
- Moussa Diakite and Wassado (Mali / Australia)
- My Bubba (Iceland / Sweden)
- Nai Palm (Australia)
- Nano Stern (Chile)
- Naomi Keyte (Australia)
- Nickodemus (USA)
- Noura Mint Seymali (Mauritania)
- Pat Thomas and Kwashibu Area Band (Ghana)
- The Pin - panel discussion w/ Remi and N'fa Jones (Australia)
- POW! Negro (Australia)
- Rahim AlHaj Trio (Iraq)
- Rajab Suleiman and Kithara (Zanzibar)
- Remi x Sampa (Australia)
- Rodrigo y Gabriela (Mexico)
- San Lazaro (Australia)
- Soul Capoeira (Australia)
- Tank and The Bangas (USA)
- TAO Dance Theater (China)
- Tex, Don and Charlie (Australia)
- Thievery Corporation (USA)
- Thundercat (USA)
- Tim Whitt (Australia)
- Tinariwen (Mali)
- Victoria Hanna (Israel)
- Violons Barbares (France / Mongolia / Bulgaria)
- Yellow Blue Bus (Australia)
- YID! (Australia)
- Yirrmal and the Miliyawutj (Australia)

USA's Peanut Butter Wolf was due to play but cancelled

Around The Park

- Ackroyd and Harvey (UK)
- Architects of Air – "Arboria" (UK)
- Cie Bivouac - "Erica's Dream" (France)
- Cie Pernette - "Commandeau" (France)
- Francois Knoetze (South Africa)
- Gratte Ciel - "Place des Anges" (France)

The Planet Talks

- Anne Sharp (Australia)
- Ben Doherty (Australia)
- Bernie Hobbs (Australia)
- Clare Press (Australia)
- Deb Tribe (Australia)
- Genevieve Bell (USA)
- Jim Robbins (USA)
- Julian Burnside (Australia)
- Kathy Jetñil-Kijiner (Marshall Islands)
- Kristin Alford (Australia)
- Peter Greste (Australia)
- Robyn Williams (Australia)
- Sonia Kleindorfer (Australia)
- Tim Costello (Australia)
- Tim Flannery (Australia)
- Toby Walsh (Australia)
- Ursula Rakova (Papua New Guinea)
- Vaughan Levitzke (Australia)
- Vivian Sim (Australia)
- Walk Sew Good (Gab Murphy and Megan O'Malley) (Australia)

KidZone

- Adelaide City Libraries Book Nook
- Amanda King – "The Bower"
- Evelyn Roth's Nylon Zoo
- SA Museum Explorers' Tent
- Story Time with Justine Clarke
- The Nature Village by Climbing Tree
- Uncle Stevie's Kaurna Classroom

== 2019 ==
Music and Dance

- Adrian Eagle (Australia)
- Alina Bzhenzhinska Quartet (Poland / UK)
- Amaru Tribe (Australia)
- Amjad Ali Khan and The ASO (India)
- Angelique Kidjo "Remain in Light" (Benin)
- Baloji (DR Congo / Belgium)
- The Bamboos (Australia)
- BCUC [Bantu Continua Uhuru Consciousness] (South Africa)
- Canzoniere Grecanico Salentino (Italy)
- Central Australian Aboriginal Women's Choir (Australia)
- Christine and the Queens (France)
- Circus Abyssinia (Ethiopia)
- Cool Out Sun (Australia)
- The Correspondents (UK)
- Dangerous Song and Bukhu (Australia / Mongolia)
- Danny Krivit (USA)
- Digital Afrika (Australia)
- DJ Harvey (UK)
- DJ SAMA (Palestine)
- Dona Onete (Brazil)
- DuOuD (Tunisia / Algeria)
- Fat Freddy's Drop (NZ)
- Fatoumata Diawara (Mali)
- Gwenno (Wales)
- Harts (Australia)
- Isango Ensemble (South Africa)
- Jamie Smith's MABON (Wales)
- Jason Heerah and Otentik Groove (Mauritius)
- John Butler Trio (Australia)
- Julia Jacklin (Australia)
- Kaiit (Australia / PNG)
- Khrunangbin (USA)
- La Dame Blanche (Cuba)
- LaBrassBanda (Germany)
- Las Cafeteras (USA)
- Leftfield (DJ set) (UK)
- Liz Phair (USA)
- Lord Echo (NZ)
- Maalem Hamid El Kasri (Morocco)
- Maarja Nuut and Ruum (Estonia)
- The Maes (Australia)
- Mambali (Australia)
- Maria Pages Company – "Yo, Carmen" (Spain)
- Marrugeku - "Le Dernier Appel" (The Last Cry) (Australia / New Caledonia)
- Mojo Juju (Australia)
- My Baby (Netherlands / NZ)
- Of Desert and Sea (Australia)
- Ollie English (Australia)
- The Original Gypsies (France)
- Rebetien (Greece)
- The Seven Ups (Australia)
- Shantel and Bucovina Club Orkestar (Romania / Germany)
- Sharon Shannon Band (Ireland)
- Silkroad Ensemble (USA / Various)
- Sona Jobarteh (Gambia)
- Taiwu Ancient Ballads Troupe (Taiwan)
- Tara Tiba (Iran / Cuba)
- TEEKS (NZ)
- Thando (Australia / Zimbabwe)
- Thelma Plum (Australia)
- Timberwolf (Australia)
- Tkay Maidza (Australia / Zimbabwe)
- Ukulele Death Squad (Australia)
- Volya - Ukrainian Cossack Dance Workshop (Australia)
- Yohai Cohen Quintet (Israel/Australia)
- Zephyr Quartet (Australia)

Around The Park

- "Arrived" (Spain / Lithuania)
- 5AngryMen - "The Bells" (Australia)
- Artonik – "The Colour of Time" (France)
- Compagnie BiLBoBaSSo - "Amore" (France)
- Janis Claxton Dance - "POP-UP DUETS: Fragments of Love" (UK)
- Le Phun – "The Leaf People" (France)
- MOD. presents "Feeling Human" (Australia)
- Olivier Grossetete - "Ephemeral City" (France)
- Punctum's Public Cooling House (Australia)

The Planet Talks

- Alex Gaut (Australia)
- Alison Pouliot (Australia)
- Andy Lowe (Australia)
- Angie Plummer (Australia)
- Annabel Crabb (Australia)
- Bunna Lawrie (Australia)
- Brian Pickles (UK)
- Cecile Godde (Australia)
- Clare Press (Australia)
- David Ritter (Australia)
- Deb Tribe (Australia)
- First Dog On The Moon (Australia)
- Fran Kelly (Australia)
- Gavin McIntyre (USA)
- Jodie Rummer (Australia)
- Matthew Evans (Australia)
- Michael Hornblow (Australia)
- Monica Gagliano (Australia)
- Natasha Stott-Despoja (Australia)
- Patricia Karvelas (Australia)
- Senator Penny Wong (Australia)
- Peter Owen (Australia)
- Quentin Baresford (Australia)
- Robyn Williams (Australia)
- Minister Simon Birmingham (Australia)

KidZone

- The Talking Trees - SAYarts
- SA Museum Explorers' Tent
- Evelyn Roth's Nylon Zoo
- Silent Disco
- The Nature Village - Climbing Tree
- Adelaide City Libraries Book Nook
- Story Time w/ Peter Helliar
- Uncle Stevie's Kaurna Classroom

== 2020 ==
Music and Dance

- Aldous Harding (NZ)
- Artefactum (Spain)
- Bill Callahan (USA)
- The Blind Boys of Alabama (USA)
- Briggs (Australia)
- The Cat Empire (Australia)
- Catrin Finch and Seckou Keita (Wales / Senegal)
- Circolombia (Colombia)
- Deline Briscoe (Australia)
- Destyn Maloya (Reunion)
- Dr Piffle and The Burlap Band (Australia)
- Dyson Stringer Cloher (Australia)
- Echo Drama (Australia)
- Ezra Collective (UK)
- B.DANCE – Floating Flowers (Taiwan)
- Flor de Toloache (Mexico / USA)
- Gelareh Pour's Garden (Iran/Australia)
- General Levy (UK)
- Greg Wilson (UK)
- Hiatus Kaiyote (Australia)
- Iberi (Georgia)
- Ifriqiyya Electrique (Maghreb / Europe)
- Jorge Ben Jor (Brazil)
- Kate Miller-Heidke (Australia)
- Kathryn Joseph (Scotland)
- KermesZ a l'Est (Belgium)
- Kikagaku Moyo (Japan)
- Kim So Ra (South Korea)
- King Ayisoba (Ghana)
- Late Nite Tuff Guy (Australia)
- Laura Marling (UK)
- Liniker e os Caramelows (Brazil)
- Los Amigos Invisibles (Venezuela)
- Luisa Sobral (Portugal)
- Marina Satti and Fones (Greece / Sudan)
- Matt Corby (Australia)
- Maubere Timor (East Timor)
- Mavis Staples (USA)
- Minyo Crusaders (Japan)
- Misstress Barbara (Italy / Canada)
- Ngaiire (PNG / Australia)
- Odette (Australia)
- Oisima (Australia)
- Orang Orang Drum Theatre – LanguKu and The Memories (Malaysia)
- Orquesta Akokan (Cuba / USA)
- Party Dozen (Australia)
- Public Opinion Afro Orchestra (Australia)
- Rhiannon Giddens with Francesco Turrisi (USA / Italy)
- RURA (Scotland)
- Salif Keita (Mali)
- Sleaford Mods (UK)
- SO.Crates (Australia)
- Spinifex Gum (Australia)
- Sprigga Mek (PNG)
- Stellie (Australia)
- Dr. L Subramaniam (India)
- Super Rats (Australia)
- Tami Neilson (NZ / Canada)
- Thandi Phoenix (Australia)
- Themba (South Africa)
- Trio Da Kali (Mali)
- True Vibenation (Australia)
- Tuuletar (Finland)
- Ustad Saami (Pakistan)
- William Barton and Veronique Serret (Australia)
- Ziggy Marley (Jamaica) - cancelled

Around The Park

- Company Archibald Caramantran (France)
- Craig Walsh – MONUMENTS (Australia)
- Foco al Aire – (Mexico) - cancelled
- Gravity and Other Myths – A Simple Space (Australia)
- MOD – Feeling Human (Australia)
- Northern Sound System Bedroom Studio (Australia)
- Wired Aerial Theatre – As the World Tipped (UK)
- 1.5 Degrees Live! (Various)

The Planet Talks

- Bernie Hobbs (Australia)
- Christiana Figueres (Costa Rica)
- Damon Gameau (Australia)
- Danny Eckert (Australia)
- Deb Tribe (Australia)
- Doha Khan (Australia)
- Fran Kelly (Australia)
- Greg Roach (Australia)
- Harriett O'Shea Carre (Australia)
- Jan Fran (Australia)
- Jill Dorrian (Australia)
- Jules Schiller (Australia)
- Julia Powles (Australia)
- Kit Warhurst (Australia)
- Marc Fennell (Australia)
- Michelle Lim (Australia)
- Milou Albrecht (Australia)
- Patricia Karvelas (Australia)
- Peter Lewis (Australia)
- Rebekha Sharkie (Australia)
- Robert Elliott Smith (USA)
- Sabra Lane (Australia)
- Sandy Verschoor (Australia)
- Sarah Hanson-Young (Australia)
- Tim Ross (Australia)
- Tory Shepherd (Australia)
- Will Steffen (Australia)

KidZone

- Story Time w/ Justine Clark
- Silent Disco w/ Guru DuDu
- The Talking Trees
- Marty McBubble
- SA Museum Explorers Tent
- Evelyn Roth's Nylon Zoo
- Climbing Tree's Nature Village
- City Libraries Book Nook
- Uncle Stevie's Kaurna Classroom

== 2021 ==
Friday	Saturday	Sunday	Monday
Sarah Blasko; Archie Roach; Lior / Westlake / Adelaide Symphony Orchestra: Compassion	Midnight Oil; Vika and Linda; MRLN x RKM (WOMADelaide x NSS Academy artists)	Tash Sultana; Kaiit; Miiesha	Midnight Oil and First Nations Collaborators: Makarrata Live; The Teskey Brothers; Siberian tiger

== 2022 ==
Music and Dance:

- A.B Original
- Aroha
- Asteroid Ekosystem
- Ausecuma Beats
- Australian Art Orchestra
- Azymuth and Marcus Valle (Brazil)
- Baker Boy
- Balkan Ethno Orchestra
- Barkaa
- Bullhorn
- Bush Gothic
- Carla Lippis' Mondo Psycho
- The Cat Empire
- Cedric Burnside (USA)
- Charles Maimarosia
- Chikchika
- Courtney Barnett
- The Crooked Fiddle Band
- Dancenorth
- Dhungala Baarka
- Eishan Ensemble
- El Gran Mono
- Electric Fields
- Elephant Sessions (Scotland)
- Elsy Wameyo
- Emma Donovan and The Putbacks
- The Empty Threats
- Farhan Shah and Sufi-Oz
- Floating Points (UK)
- Gaby Moreno (USA)
- Glass Beams
- Goanna
- Gordon Koang
- Grace Barbé
- Haiku Hands
- High Ace
- Inner City (Live) (USA)
- Jayda G (Canada)
- Jerome Farah
- Joseph Tawadros and James Tawadros
- Joseph Tawadros w/ the Adelaide Symphony Orchestra
- Karen Lee Andrews
- King Stingray
- Kutcha Edwards
- L-Fresh The Lion
- L.A.B (New Zealand)
- Luluc
- Makepisi
- Martinez Akustica
- Melbourne Ska Orchestra
- Motez (Live)
- The New Monos
- Parvyn
- Paul Kelly
- Reb Fountain (New Zealand)
- The Shaolin Afronauts
- Silence w/ the ASO
- Sokel
- Sonz Of Serpent
- Sorong Samarai
- Springtime
- Sub-Tribe
- Taikoz
- Te Tangi O Te Ka'ara
- Tijuana Cartel
- Valanga Khoza
- Victor Martinez
- Yid!
- Ye-Yé 2.0
- Zöj

Around the Park

- Bush Mechanics: The Exhibition
- Cathedral Of Light
- Cocoloco
- Angus Watt Flags
- Gravity and Other Myths
- Hexadeca
- Kardla Paltendi (Dancing Fire)
- NSS Studio
- Peter Drew - Aussie
- Restless Dance Theatre
- Taksu
- The Memoryologist
- Tim Koch - Halcyon

Planet Talks

- Alex Bruhn
- Amber Brock - Fabel
- Amelia Chaplin
- Andrew Blakers
- Anika Molesworth
- Anthony James
- Bruce Pascoe
- Charles Massy
- Jane Goodall (UK)
- Katja Hogendoorn
- Keira Jenkins
- Lee Constable
- Lisa Hill
- Luke Price
- Martin Breed
- Michael Harvey
- Michael - Shawn Fletcher
- Natasha Mitchell
- Nick Feik
- Pantju Nam
- Renate Egan
- Richard Denniss
- Richard Glatz
- Rocio Ponce-Reyes
- Scott Stephens
- Tiahni Adamson
- Waleed Aly

KidZone

- Climbing Tree's Nature Village
- Evelyn Roth's Nylon Zoo
- Lakun Mara
- Mirror Mirror
- Story Time W/ Eddie Betts
- Uncle Stevie's Kaurna Classroom

== 2023 ==
'Music and Dance'

- ADG7 (South Korea)
- Ailan Songs Project (Australia)
- Alexander Flood (Australia)
- Angel Olsen (USA)
- Asanti Dance Theatre (Ghana/Australia)
- AURORA (Norway)
- Aurora Vocal Ensemble (Australia)
- Bab L' Bluz (Morocco/France)
- Balaklava Blues (Canada/Ukraine)
- Bandaluzia (Australia)
- Bangarra Dance Theatre Terrain (Australia)
- Beckah Amani (Australia)
- Béla Fleck and Abigail Washburn (USA)
- Billy Bragg (UK)
- Bon Iver (USA)
- Cimafunk (Cuba)
- Constantinople (Canada)
- Danielle (PNG)
- DEM MOB (Australia)
- Didier Kumalo (Australia)
- Dili Allstars (Timor Leste/Australia)
- Fantastic Negrito (USA)
- Florence + The Machine (UK)
- Garifuna Collective, The (Belize)
- Genesis Owusu and the Black Dog Band (Australia)
- Grace Cummings (Australia)
- GUTS (DJ) (France/Spain)
- Izy (Australia)
- Jaguar (UK)
- Jamie Goldsmith (Australia)
- Julian Belbachir (Australia)
- Justin Adams and Mauro Durante (UK/Italy)
- Jyoty (UK)
- Kee'ahn (Australia)
- Kefaya and Elaha Soroor (Afghanistan/UK/Italy)
- Kokoroko (UK)
- Kronos Quartet (USA)
- Lachy Doley Group, The (Australia)
- Langan Band, The (Scotland)
- Madeleine Peyroux (USA)
- Mdou Moctar (Niger)
- MEUTE (Germany)
- Mindy Meng Wang 王萌 and Tim Shiel (China/Australia)
- Nakhane (South Africa)
- Ngangki Warra (Australia)
- Nightmares on Wax (DJ) (UK)
- Ondatrópica (Colombia)
- Pandit Ronu Majumdar and Dr Jayanthi Kumaresh (India)
- Proclaimers, The (Scotland)
- Quinteto Astor Piazzolla (Argentina)
- Ria Hall (New Zealand)
- Richard J Frankland (Australia)
- Ripple Effect Band (Australia)
- Rizwan Muazzam Qawwals (Pakistan)
- Sampa The Great (Zambia)
- San Salvador (France)
- Sister Nancy meets Legal Shot (Jamaica/France)
- Small Island Big Song (Taiwan/PNG/Mauritius/Aus+)
- Sons Of Zöku (Australia)
- Soul II Soul (UK)
- TAIAHA (New Zealand/Australia)
- Taikurtinna (Australia)
- Tarabeat x MzRizk (Lebanon/Australia)
- Taraf de Caliu (Romania)
- Tiana Khasi (Samoa/India/Australia)
- Youssou N'Dour and Le Super Étoile de Dakar (Senegal)
- Yungchen Lhamo (Tibet)

Around the Park

- Angus Watt flags (UK)
- Didier Théron Company - La Grande Phrase / The Big Phrase (France)
- Foco alAire LOStheULTRAMAR (Mexico)
- Gaia by Luke Jerram (UK)
- Galmae c'est pas là, c'es par là / it's not that way, it's this way (France/South Korea)
- Gosti - (Australia)
- Gratte Ciel Place des Anges (France)
- Ku Arts Connecting to Country (Australia)
- NSS Studio (Australia)

Planet Talks

- Alice Jones
- Anne Poelina
- Brynn O'Brien
- Catriona Macleod
- Dan Bourchier
- Emma Carmody
- Erin O'Donnell
- Eytan Lenko
- Fran Kelly
- Maree Lowes
- Megan Davis
- Nikolai Beilharz
- Patricia Anderson AO
- Patricia Karvelas
- Penny Wong
- Peter Burdon
- Phill Cassey
- Polly Hemming
- Ruby Jones
- Sally Scales
- Sarah Wheeler
- Steve Meller
- Tanya Ha
- Tory Shepherd

KidZone

- Adelaide City Libraries Book Nook
- Art Gallery of South Australia
- Cirkidz and Kaurna Warra Pintyanthi
- Climbing Tree's Nature Village
- Evelyn Roth's Nylon Zoo
- Guru Dudu
- Ripple Effect Band Workshop
- South Australian Museum - Explorer's Tent
- Story Time With Rachael Coopes
- Uncle Stevie's Kaurna Classroom
- University of Adelaide - Edible Insect Adventure

== 2024 ==
Music and Dance

- A.Girl (Australia)
- Al-Qasar (France/Turkey/Armenia/USA)
- Angelique Kidjo (Benin)
- Arooj Aftab (USA/Pakistan)
- Aurora Vocal Ensemble (Australia)
- AURUS (Reunion)
- Baaba Maal (Senegal)
- Black Jesus Experience (Ethiopia/Aus)
- Born in a Taxi - Illuminated Angels
- Braxe + Falcon (France)
- Bromham (Australia)
- Budos Band, The (USA)
- Bumpy (Australia)
- Cambodian Space Project, The (Cambodia/Aus)
- CC:DISCO! (Australia)
- Charlotte Adigéry and Bolis Pupul (Belgium)
- Cie L'immédiat - La lévitation réelle (France)
- Compagnie On Off - Le Chant de L'eau (France)
- Corinne Bailey Rae (UK)
- CORPUS - Divine Intervention and Les moutons (Canada)
- Cymande (UK)
- DakhaBrakha (Ukraine)
- Dean Brady (Australia)
- DJ Koco (Japan)
- Druid Fluids (Australia)
- DUBIOZA KOLEKTIV (Bosnia and Herzegovina)
- Elephants Laugh - Muljil (South Korea)
- Elle Shimada (Australia)
- Emel Mathlouthi (Tunisia)
- Emma Volard (Australia)
- Erin Buku (Australia)
- Folk Bitch Trio (Australia)
- Gilberto Gil (Brazil)
- Good Ones, The (Rwanda)
- Handspring Puppet Company Celebration Parade - with Slingsby Theatre Co (South Africa)
- Hollie Cook (UK)
- Ibibio Sound Machine (UK)
- Illapu (Chile)
- Jen Cloher + T'HONI (Aus/NZ)
- José González (Sweden)
- Ju Ben (Fiji)
- Katanga Junior (Tanzania/Aus)
- Kaurna Welcomes to Country - Jamie G Taikurtinna and Ashum Owen Ngangki Warra (Australia)
- La Bomba (Australia)
- Leenalchi (South Korea)
- Lisa O'Neill and Cormac Begley (Ireland)
- MC Yallah and Debmaster (Uganda/France)
- Omar Rajeh I Maqamat – Beytna (Lebanon/France)
- Mari Kalkun (Estonia)
- Marta Pereira da Costa (Portugal)
- Mauskovic Dance Band (Netherlands)
- Mildlife (Australia)
- Mo'Ju (Australia)
- Moonlight Benjamin (Haiti/France)
- Morcheeba (UK)
- Pongo (Angola/Portugal)
- Pt. Tejendra Narayan Majumdar and Dr. Ambi Subramaniam (India)
- Rob Edwards (Australia)
- RoZéO - Gratte Ciel (France)
- Seun Kuti and Egypt 80 (Nigeria)
- Sharon Shannon Big Band (Ireland)
- Sofia Menguita (Australia)
- Slowmango (Australia)
- Son Rompe Pera (Mexico)
- STREB EXTREME ACTION (USA)
- Tenzin Choegyal (Tibet/Aus)
- Thee Sacred Souls (USA)
- Tio (Vanuatu)
- Wantok Sing Sing feat. TELEK (Oceania)
- Wildfire Manwurrk (Australia)
- WITCH (Zambia)
- Yoga - The Dock Studios (Australia)
- Yussef Dayes (UK)
- Ziggy Marley (Jamaica)
- Ziggy Ramo (Australia)

Planet Talks

- Abby Barrows
- Anote Tong
- Andrew Lowe
- Andrew Skeoch
- Anthony Albrecht
- Ariadne Gorring
- Bob Brown
- Bronwyn Gillanders
- Chris Daniels
- Clare Peddie
- Darryl Jones
- Elaine Johnson
- Joe Morrison
- Kate Andrews
- Martine Maron
- Noah Schultz-Byard
- Roj Amedi
- Sarah Bekessy
- Shannon Evenden
- Sheryn Pitman
- Simone Slattery
- Tiahni Adamson
- Tishiko King
- Vanessa Pirotta
- Yessie Mosby

Around the Park

- Born in a Taxi – Illuminated Angels
- Cie L'immediat - La lévitation réelle
- Compagnie On Off - Le Chant de L'eau
- CORPUS - Les moutons and Divine Intervention
- Elephants Laugh – Muljil
- Handspring Puppet Company - Celebration Parade
- Gratte Ciel - RoZéO
- NSS Studio
- STREB EXTREME ACTION
- Taikurtinna Welcome to Country

KidZone

- Art Gallery of South Australia – Paper Garden
- City of Adelaide – City Libraries
- Belinda and Marika Wilson - Ku Arts / Iwiri Arts / Sonya Rankine - First Nations weavers
- Guru Dudu – Silent Disco Walking Tours
- Handspring Puppet Company
- Leafy Seadragon
- Nature Play SA – endangered species puppet making
- Evelyn Roth's Nylon Zoo
- Pacific Island Council SA - performances and weaving activity
- Uncle Stevie's Kaurna Classroom
- Zoos SA – finger puppets
