= Los de Abajo =

Official barra brava of Universidad de Chile

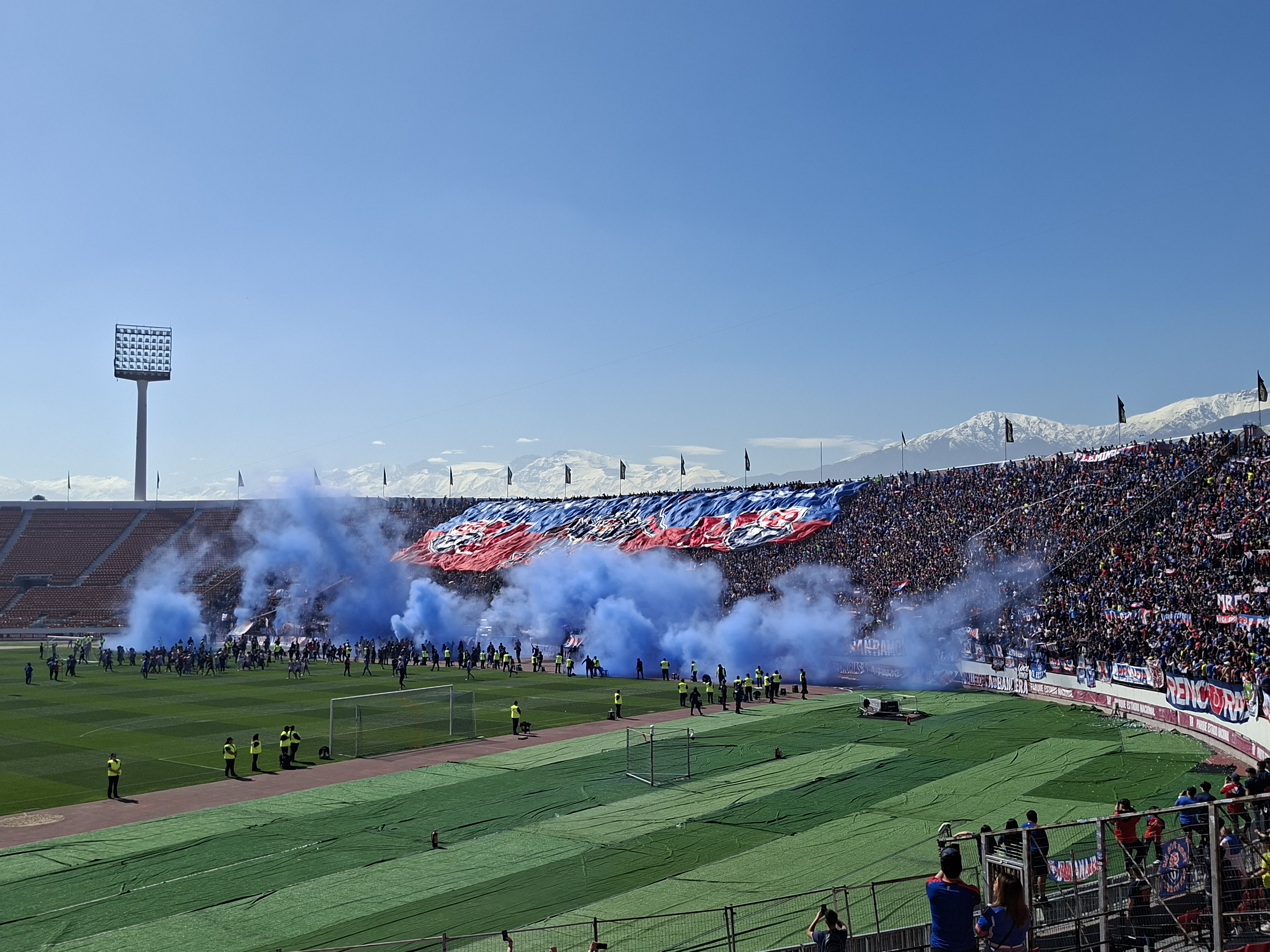
- Los de Abajo supporting Universidad de Chile in Banderazo.
- Nickname: LDA
- Established: 1989
- Type: Supporters' group Ultras group
- Team: Universidad de Chile
- Location: Santiago, Chile
- Arena: Estadio Nacional Julio Martínez Prádanos
- Stand: South stand (Galería Sur)
- Colors: Blue, Red

Los de Abajo ("The Ones From Below") is the official barra brava of Universidad de Chile. They are one of the biggest groups of supporters in Chile. It is the team that takes the most people to the stadium in Chile.

== History ==
In 1987, Universidad de Chile disputed the last places in the honor series, while the official bar at that time, Imperio Azul, commanded by Eduardo Martínez, young fans, mostly of the thrash metal and punk style, who participated in it began to gather and they stood below it, glued to the fence, singing and encouraging the team with a couple of canvases with the text "Devotos del Bulla" and "Con la U Siempre", which broke the traditional scheme by incorporating phrases referring to the identification of the fans towards the team. Some of his modernizing ideas clashed in part with the generational barrier made up of the other members of the fans. Among these ideas was eliminating the snare drum and letting the bass drum sound alone and to one beat, in the Argentine way, streamlining the songs and giving a more active and aggressive attitude to the attitude that the fans should have. When Universidad de Chile returned to the first division, Los de Abajo began to be more active, mainly as a result of confrontations involving fans of Colo-Colo and Universidad de Chie during the derbies.

The final friction that determined the final separation occurred in a match with Audax Italiano prior to the official promotion competition. Before this, the classic was played with Colo-Colo, where Los de Abajo obtained as a trophy a large flag that belonged to the White Claw. This type of action had no place in the fan fees of the official bar, so the return of the aforementioned flag to its legitimate owners was requested. Given the refusal, it was decided to move from the south-east sector to the south-west sector of the Nacional. This would be the beginning of the fans as an independent group, adopting the name by which the group was known for always being located in the lower part of the galleries next to the fence.

In 1994, Universidad de Chile won its first title in 25 years. The final match was played in the city of El Salvador, a mining town of 10,000 inhabitants in the desert or Chile. The stadium's capacity was of 20,000 but 25,000 supporters of Universidad de Chile (football club) travelled to witness the end of the title drought.

== Criticism ==
From the beginning the group have been criticised for the being violent. The press have been very critical and claim that the barras bravas are the reason for the lack of fans at matches. They have been also been involved in scuffles with the police.

Attendants to football matches, according to the Chilean law, must be registered on the "Registro de Hinchas" ("Football Fans Register) Usually, those involved in violence are members using other people's ID's to "trick the system", since many, who supports other teams too, as members of "Garra Blanca", have been banned to enter any match. Many regular supporters of the Team considered them to be outsiders of the "barra" that just go to the stadiums to cause conflict.

== Social and political activism ==
Los de Abajo are well known for their left-wing ideas. As a "Barra Brava", they were born in the Pinochet dictatorship, and the majority of the Universidad de Chile fans were known for their opposition at the dictatorship. On the other hand, Pinochet was honorary president of the archrival Colo-Colo, and many universidad fans think that he helped on the building of the stadium with government funds, though they have no proof of this, yet Pinochet during his dictatorship stole many State funds to himself, so it's not a far fetched claim.

The group is mainly formed by working-class men and women, lower-class teens, and students. Los de Abajo make several charity events, and recreational activities. Also, in 1999 they opened the "Escuela Libre Los de Abajo", a free school for teens of low-class and people that didn't finish their basic grades. In 2006 they also open a free pre-university, so the students can study to achieve the university aptitude exam.

Politically, in 2003, they were one of the founding organizations of the Juntos Podemos Más, a left-wing coalition that includes the Communist Party of Chile and several others organizations. They had one candidate to deputy on the 2005 parliamentary election.
