= Tishiko King =

Indigenous Australian climate activist

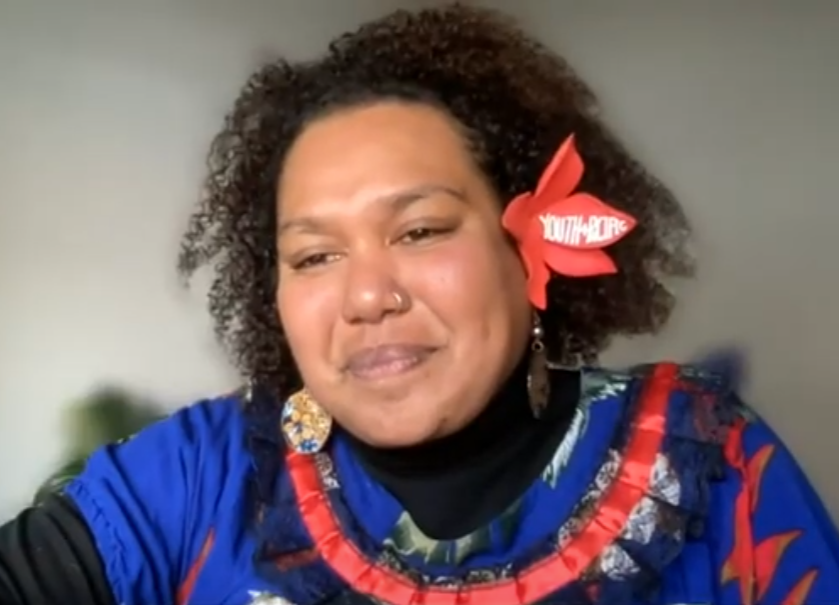
- In an ANU video in 2022
- Education: Griffith University
- Occupation: Activist

Tishiko King is originally from Yorke Island in the Torres Strait Islands of Australia. She is the campaign director at Seed Indigenous Youth Climate Network and took part in the 2021 United Nations Climate Change Conference (COP26) in Glasgow, where she also represented the Torres Strait island organization, Our Islands Our Home.

== Early life and education ==
King, an Indigenous Australian, which belong to Kulkalaig group who lived in Masig Island (Yorke Island) and has strong family connections with Badu Island, also in the Torres Strait. Kulkalaig is an indigenous people who lived in Central Island which located in Torres Strait Island. Kulkalaig divided into people who lived in Masig, Nagir and Tud Island. She left her home to attend a boarding school at a young age and grew up in a mining town, seeing the impact the mining had on the traditional owners. After one year of undergraduate study, she dropped out of university and worked at a resort on Moreton Island, north east of Brisbane, which strengthened her love of the ocean. Her decision to pursue a career as a marine biologist was further influenced by Cyclone Hamish in 2009 which caused damage to the MV Pacific Adventurer ship, resulting in spillage of fuel and containers of ammonium nitrate into the Coral Sea, which washed ashore on Moreton Island and surrounding areas. King was part of the clean-up crew on Moreton Island, enabling her to see first-hand the damage caused to the coastline and to the marine life. King is getting her Bachelor of Science from Griffith University.

== Career and activism ==
Some years later, King returned to university, to study ocean science at Griffith University in South East Queensland with sponsorship from CSIRO, the Australian agency responsible for scientific research. She then worked as an indigenous liaison officer with a bauxite mining company in Weipa, on the Cape York Peninsula in Queensland. She then became the campaign director at Seed Indigenous Youth Climate Network and also works as a volunteer impact coordinator with Environmental Film Festival Australia. She is also community organizer for Our Islands Our Home.

King represented Seed Indigenous Youth Climate Network and Our Islands Our Home at the COP26 meeting in Glasgow in November 2021. Because of COVID-19 restrictions, she was one of relatively few Australians to participate. She first became aware of the impact of climate change when she saw the impact of sea erosion on the graveyard of her ancestors on Masig Island, assisting with picking up their bones for reburial, and also noticed that fish were disappearing from traditional fishing grounds. She condemned the federal government of Australia for failing to make reference to indigenous people in its plan to reach net zero emissions by 2050, released shortly before the COP26 meeting.

King's participation at the summit was made possible by crowdfunding. On completion of the Summit she published an article entitled "Empty words, no action: Cop26 has failed First Nations people", which was published in The Guardian online newspaper and reproduced on many other web sites.

== Personal life ==
King's brother, Yessie Mosby is one of eight claimants for Torres Strait 8. Torres Strait 8 is a movement from eight citizen of the Torres Strait Islands who accused the Australian Government for his lack of action on climate change and making complaint to the UN Human Rights.
