= Watussi =

Australian rock 'n' roots band

- Origin: Sydney, Australia
- Genre: Afro-Colombian rock 'n' roots
- Years active: 2005–2015
- Members: Michael Brown: Flute and saxophone
- Website: https://watussimusic.bandcamp.com/

Watussi was a Sydney-based band that performed Afro-Colombian rock 'n' roots, with lyrics mainly sung in Spanish. The band's name is slang for "the most handsome man at the party". Their album Tequila, Sangre y Fuego was nominated for the 2008 ARIA Award for Best World Music Album. The band's lead was Colombian born singer-songwriter and producer Oscar Jimenez.

In 2010 back from a South American tour, they began work on their next Album El Olvido with producer Joel Hamilton. The album was released in September 2011.

In 2012, they collaborated with New Orleans legend Jon Cleary with whom they arranged recorded and released the tracks "Che Che Cole" (by Willie Colon's) and "Agua".

== Members ==
- Oscar Jimenez – vocals, guitar
- Vicente Sebastian – percussion
- Pat Harris – bass
- Michael Brown – saxophone, flute
- Simon Feranci – trumpet, trombone
- Nick Garbett – trumpet
- Daniel Saddleton – drums
- Daniel Pliner – keyboards, vocals

== Former members ==
- Simon Olsen – guitar
- Jared Kneale – drums

== Discography ==
=== Albums ===
List of albums
Title	Album details
Tequila, Sangre y Fuego	Released: 2007; Label: Watussi; Formats: CD
100% Handsom	Released: 2009; Label: Watussi; Formats: CD, digital
El Olvido	Released: September 2011; Label: Watussi; Formats: CD, digital

== Awards and nominations ==
=== ARIA Music Awards ===
The ARIA Music Awards is an annual awards ceremony that recognises excellence, innovation, and achievement across all genres of Australian music. They commenced in 1987.

Year	Nominee / work	Award	Result	Ref.
2008	Tequila, Sangre y Fuego	Best World Music Album	Nominated	
