= Terem Quartet =

Russian musical ensemble

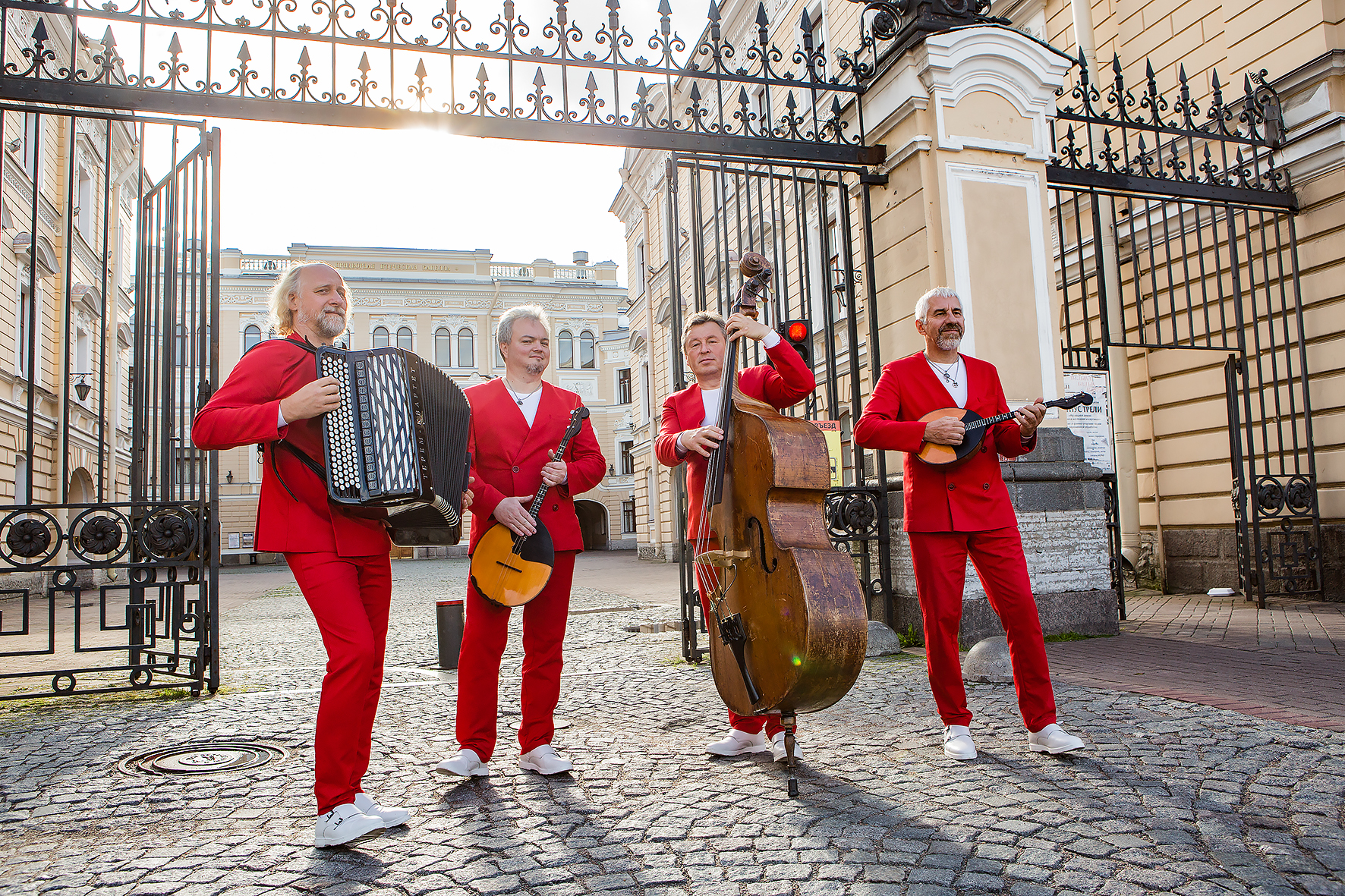
- Terem Quartet. From left to right: Andrey Smirnov, Alexey Barshchev, Vladimir Kudryavtcev and Andrey Konstantinov

Background information
- Origin: Saint Petersburg, Russia
- Genre: Classical crossover
- Years active: 1986–present
- Members: Andrey Konstantinov; Andrey Smirnov; Vladimir Kudryavtcev; Alexey Barshchev
- Past members: Igor Ponomarenko, Mikhail Dzudze
- Website: https://terem-quartet.ru/

The Terem Quartet (Russian: Терем Квартет) is a musical ensemble from Saint Petersburg, Russia. The ensemble, which plays in the Crossover genre, was created in 1986. Having represented St Petersburg in cultural events across the world, the quartet has come to be regarded as a symbol of their native city.

The current line-up is: Andrey Konstantinov (soprano domra), Andrey Smirnov (bayan), Vladimir Kudryavtcev (double bass) and Alexey Barshchev (alto domra)

== History ==
=== 1980s ===
The ensemble was created in 1986 as a project of four Saint Petersburg Conservatory students: Andrey Konstantinov (soprano domra), Andrey Smirnov (bayan), Mikhail Dzudze (double bass balalaika) and Igor Ponomarenko (alto domra). At one time the students were called up for military service. After the first year of this service they were transferred to the local army ensemble, which consisted of orchestra, choir and ballet. Some time later, an idea to create a new ensemble was born and this one was called "Russian Souvenir".

At this time we promised each other that just the ensemble will be the main thing for all of us. We have already understood that we are interesting only when we are together. Our "Terem" is not just a beautiful building. There are no chiefs for us, everyone does his bit and it forms what we are building. In our music we unite different genres under one roof. Terem is open for guests, we are always glad to see them (Andrey Konstantinov)

The group's first concert took place on 26 November 1986 on the stage of music teachers training college. According to Andrey Konstantinov, at the end of the performance the audience stood up to applaud and the musicians knew they had made the right choice. In 1989 Melodiya released the first LP record of the ensemble - "Terem Quartet".

=== 1990s ===
In 1991, the quartet was invited to take part in the Womad festival in the UK, where they performed along with the likes of Peter Gabriel, Sinéad O'Connor, Suzanne Vega and Led Zeppelin. At Gabriel's instance, Real World Records recorded the quartet's first CD – "The Terem" – which was released in 1992. AllMusic gave it 4.5 stars, saying: "The Quartet's eccentric approach transforms everything it touches into shades of humor and delight.". In the following years, Terem Quartet repeatedly performed at Womad.

In 1994. Pope John Paul II invited Terem Quartet to the Vatican. Here, on the "Family Day" holiday, they gave a concert to an audience of 120,000, among whom was Mother Teresa, who blessed the musicians and presented them with medallions. This year two CDs were released: "Classical" and "1000 concert" (1000-й концерт). The first was released by "Real World Records" and took its name from the inclusion of pieces by Mozart, Schubert, Glinka and Chopin. The second is a recording of the 1000 concert in Saint Petersburg Philharmonia and was released on the Terem Quartet label.

In 1998, the quartet performed at the Edinburgh festival in the UK, and the ensemble's concerts received the highest marks from The Scotsman newspaper.

In 1999, as part of the 300th anniversary celebrations for Alexander Pushkin, Terem Quartet played Alexander Chaikovsky's opera in St. James's Palace in London. Among the audience was Prince Charles (now King Charles III). That year, two further CDs were released. The first was No, Russia Cannot Be Perceived by Wit ("Intuition" Label), produced by Giovanni Amighetti and awarded four stars by AllMusic: "These classically-trained musicians exhibit masterful technique at their tools. The sounds they make seem to arise from an ensemble much greater than a quartet. Subtle, inventive, and gifted with a sense of humor, their gypsy turns thrill and enthrall". The second, Flea Waltz (Sobachy Vals), was released by Bomba-Piter.

=== 2000–2010 ===
In 2000, the line-up underwent a change as Igor Ponomarenko was replaced by Alexey Barshchev. In 2002, Bomba-Piter released a three-CD compilation: Anthology I, "Anthology II" and "Anthology III". In addition, the album Russian Sufferings was released.

In 2003, the Terem Quartet organized their own world music festival in Saint Petersburg. In 2004, three more CDs were released: Terem Quartet and Friends (featuring the Remake ensemble, comprising Vladimir Chernov, Joji Hirota, Svetlana Kruchkova, Dora Shwarzberg, Igor Sharapov, Arkady Shilkloper and Igor Dmitriev), "2000th concert" (recording of the concert in Saint Petersburg Philharmonia on 25 March 2004) and "Neapolitan Songs" (joint project with Vladimir Chernov).

In 2009, the quartet opened the Eurovision second semi-final in Moscow. For this event, the musicians prepared a six-minute potpourri of songs by winners of this competition, including ("Waterloo" by ABBA, "Volare", "Diva" by Dana International, "Believe" by Dima Bilan and Ding-A-Dong by Teach-In). Also this year, the quartet released a DVD. "Terem Quartet or Imperceptibles" (Terem-Quartet Y Snova Neulovimiye).

== Style ==
In 1991 Peter Gabriel called the ensemble style "Teremism" by analogy with "communism". In European terminology Terem-Quartet's style is known as "World music".

In the "Creative Infantry" (Tvorchesky Desant) programme the musicians themselves spoke about their style. The name of the ensemble resembles this attitude: "Terem" is a big house which unites musical currents all over the world.

Terem is not only a house. It is a place where everything is fine. When creating the ensemble if we had set our goal to make money we wouldn't have become Terem. We always have had a sublime goal - to create contemporary music on the basis of national one so that it was clear and public. So that it excited us and the audience (Andrey Konstantinov).

== Critics ==
The Quartet's immaculate musicianship shines like an illuminated manuscript...(Independent)

Mozart, Chopin and Bizet as you've never heard them before - classical music become theatre. (The Scotsman)

Love, hatred, irony, more philosophical feelings, all of these are mixed in Russian music, it's very spiritual. (Independent)

Nikita Mikhalkov said that it was important for him to find a wonderful combination of professionalism, musicality, mischief and root structure in the ensemble.

Following a joint performance with the ensemble, Yuri Shevchuk said that his band DDT and Terem Quartet will be friends. For their 20th anniversary, he presented the quartet with notes of his songs in the hope that they would perform one of them. The Terem Quartet subsequently recorded three songs from DDT's "Beautiful Love" (Prekrasnaya Lubov) album.

== Members ==
The current line-up comprises:

- Andrey Konstantinov (Soprano domra)
- Andrei Smirnov (Bayan accordion)
- Vladimir Kudryavtcev (Double bass)
- Alexey Barshev (Alto domra)

== Releases ==
=== LP ===
No.	Name	Year	Label
1	Terem Quartet	1989	Melodiya

=== Compact cassettes ===
№	Name	Year
1	Terem Quartet (double album)	1989
2	Russian-German music	1992
3	Anthology I	1994
4	Anthology II	1999
4	Flea Waltz	1999

=== CD ===
№	Name	Year	Label
1	The Terem	1991	Real World Records
2	Classical	1994	Real World Records
3	1000-th concert (1000-й концерт)	1994	Terem Quartet
4	No, Russia cannot be perceived by wit	1999	Intuition
5	Flea Waltz (Собачий вальс)	1999	Bomba-Piter
6	Jubillenium (Юбилениум)	2001	Bomba-Piter
7	Anthology I	2002	Bomba-Piter
8	Anthology II	2002	Bomba-Piter
9	Anthology III	2002	Bomba-Piter
10	Russian Sufferings (Русские страдания)	2002	Bomba-Piter
11	Terem-Quartet and Friends (Терем-квартет и его друзья)	2004	Bomba-Piter
12	2000-th concert (2000-й концерт)	2004	Terem Quartet
13	Vladimir Chernov and Terem Quartet "Neapolitan Songs" (Владимир Чернов и Терем-Квартет "Неаполитанские песни")	2004	Terem Quartet
14	Teremok (children's song album)	2006	Bomba-Piter
15	Teremok on German (children's song album)	2008	Terem-Quartet
16	Diddu og Terem	2008	Sögur
16	La Folle Journée. Schubert	2008 |	
17	TÉRÉMok!(chanson populaire française) (children's song album)	2010	Terem Quartet
18	TeremOK!: Ai-Chu-Chu (children's song album)	2010	Terem Quartet
19	Russian Schubert	2011	Terem Quartet
20	MyBach	2011	Terem Quartet
21	Roads	2013	Terem Quartet
22	Russian Paintings	2017	Terem Quartet

=== DVD ===
№	Name	Year	Label
1	Terem-Quartet or Imperceptibles	2009	Terem-Quartet

== Other activity ==
Since 2003 Terem-Quartet organizes world music festivals in Saint Petersburg.
