= Spy File =

Compilation album by Spy vs. Spy
- Released: 1991
- Recorded: 1984–1989
- Label: EastWest Records
- Producer: V.Spy V.Spy, Les Karski, Gary Grey, Craig Leon, Gary Fox

Spy vs. Spy chronology
Trash the Planet (1989)	Spy File (1991)	Fossil (1993)

Spy File (subtitled The Best of V. Spy V. Spy) is the first greatest hits album by Australian rock band Spy vs. Spy. It was released in 1991 and peaked at number 85 on the ARIA charts in 1992.

It includes tracks from the band's 1984 EP Meet Us Inside and first four studio albums.

== Track listing ==
No.	Title	from the Album	Length
1.	"All Over the World"	Harry's Reasons	4:45
2.	"The Golden Mile"	Xenophobia (Why?)	3:53
3.	"Hardtimes"	Trash the Planet	2:51
4.	"Sallie-Anne"	A.O. Mod. TV. Vers.	5:10
5.	"Harrys Reasons"	Harry's Reasons	4:30
6.	"Use Your Head"	A.O. Mod. TV. Vers.	4:28
7.	"Injustice"	Harry's Reasons	3:20
8.	"One of a Kind"	Meet Us Inside	6:40
9.	"Credit Cards"	A.O. Mod. TV. Vers.	4:36
10.	"Clarity of Mind"	Xenophobia (Why?)	3:50
11.	"Waiting"	Xenophobia (Why?)	3:22
12.	"Working Week"	Xenophobia (Why?)	4:32
13.	"Our House"	Trash the Planet	3:26
14.	"Clear Skies"	Trash the Planet	3:57
15.	"Don't Tear It Down"	A.O. Mod. TV. Vers.	4:05
16.	"Oceania"	Trash the Planet	2:50
17.	"A.O. Mod"	Xenophobia (Why?)	3:35

== Charts ==
Chart performance for Spy File
Chart (1991–1992)	Peak position
Australian Albums (ARIA)	85

== Release history ==
Country	Date	Label	Format	Catalogue
Australia	1991	EastWest Records	CD	903175649-2
Brazil	1991	Warner Music Group	CD	M175649-2
