= Ya Ya Choral =

Australian rock/pop band

- Origin: Sydney, Australia
- Genres: synth-pop; hard rock; post-punk; art rock
- Years active: 1982-1994
- Labels: M2; Red Eye; Maelstromm; Rattlesnake
- Spinoff of: The Systematics
- Past members: Fiona Graham; Michael Tee; Patrick Gibson; Michael Filewood; Chris Morrow; Joanna Urbanik; Polly Newham; John Bliss; Dave Kelly; Rob Dunne; Paul Abrahams

Ya Ya Choral was a Sydney band active in the 1980s and early 90s. Though a synthesizer-based three-piece when it began, the group later became a hard rock five-piece, and played in both inner-city and outer suburban venues. The hard rock version of the group toured Britain. A third iteration of the group, reduced to a duo, reinvented itself as a pop band in the early 1990s.

== The Systematics ==
Two of Ya Ya Choral's founding members, Fiona Graham (22 April 1962 – 21 May 2013) and Patrick Gibson (11 October 1961 - 4 May 2019) had been active in The Systematics, which began as a project of Patrick Gibson's in the late 1970s. He was initially the sole member, and released the single 'Pulp Baby' in 1979. Michael Filewood, a childhood friend of Gibson's, joined and the duo released Rural, an 8-track EP, in 1980 (a cassette called Rural Side 3 was also available at this time) on the M2 label, operated by Mitch Jones and Michael Tee, both of whom played in Scattered Order. A third Systematics release, a 7" EP called My Life in the Field of Cows (the title is a joke reference to Brian Eno and David Byrne's album My Life in the Bush of Ghosts, released the previous year) was issued in 1982. It featured Fiona Graham, previously a member of Splendid Mess and another childhood friend of Gibson's, who became the third member of the group when they transitioned to playing live. Tee recalled in 1983 that 'when they played their first show... I was going to join the band but I just never got round to doing it, I was just too scared.' Instead, he became their sound engineer for live shows. Filewood was the Systematics’ guitarist; all three members played keyboards; Gibson and Graham were vocalists.

In an unusual move for an obscure independent band, the Systematics obtained support slots for The Cure’s shows in Sydney in August 1981. Patrick Gibson writes that:

The story goes that Michael Tee and Fiona were watching Sounds on the morning of Saturday Aug. 8 when Robert Smith of The Cure let slip in a live interview with Donnie Sutherland... that they were playing that night in Sydney and still hadn't organised a support band. As ludicrous as that sounds, I swear it's the truth. It was, in any event, the work of a moment for the enterprising Tee to hop on the blower to Channel Seven (for it was they) and offer the services of Fiona, Filewood and myself, should our British cousins require us.

According to the insert in the live cassette release Stall, this led to three support slots with The Cure on the 8th, 9th and 17th of August 1981. One of these shows was recorded by Michael Tee from the mixing desk and released in 2009 as part of a box set of albums, Pardon me for barging in like this... M Squared Rare Recordings: 1979-1983. The Systematics supported other, local, acts such as Hunters and Collectors and Models, but had broken up (with, Gibson suggests, 'a minimum of acrimony') by the time My Life in the Field of Cows was released: according to the text on its back cover, it was 'a posthumous release'.

== 'Lounge' era ==
Seen by some as The Systematics with a minor line-up change, Ya Ya Choral was Gibson and Graham without Filewood but joined by Michael Tee (real name Michael Coffey) (9 December 1958 – 15 May 2024) who had been an experimental recording artist since his early teens and was co-proprietor of the M2 label and studio. Tee had released music on M2 under the name 'A Cloakroom Assembly', a solo project which often also included contributions from collaborators including Gibson and Graham ('sometimes I opened up and let other people in', he writes on the 'production notes' to the A Cloakroom Assembly album mrrk+MRRK). In addition to the three core members, the original Ya Ya Choral were 'backed by a "choir" of friends', Phil Turnbull writes, 'who tried their hardest but never sounded more than clamorous.'

Ya Ya Choral recorded its first EP, Such a Dutchman, in March 1982, and released it the same year on M2. The group described their new sound as 'ambient disco' though much later Tee would categorise this as their 'Lounge' era. In October, 1982 Stuart Coupe referred to them as 'M Squared's most commercially viable band'. In 2023, Tee wrote:

This version of YYC were so much better live than on record. We needed help, to fully realise our potential, before we ran out of energy. So we just had our instincts. When the three of us got together on a stage something magic happened. People loved us or hated us. But we certainly had lots of attention.

In May, 1983 the group underwent a considerable change; the three-piece with Gibson played a final show at the Sydney Trade Union Club on the 27th of that month. A second EP, What's a Quaver? followed with the three core members joined by three former members of The Reels, John Bliss, Paul Abrahams and Polly Newham. The title of one song on What's a Quaver?, 'My Friend the Chocolate Cake,' was appropriated in 1989 by David Bridie and Helen Mountfort for their Melbourne band of that name. Decades later Michael Tee, reminiscing on the No Night Sweats website, wrote 'I must apologise for my friend the chocolate cake (R.I.P.) using a YYC song title for their band name.'

In May, 1983, Graham and Tee parted ways with Gibson (many years later, Tee wrote that they 'self-sabotaged') they briefly changed the group's name to Zeee Toons (the three 'e's presenting a challenge for the press), suggesting the new version would be 'a bit rockier than its predecessor'. Ahead of their first show under this name (which officially took place on 24 September 1983 although attendees to their shows in Melbourne two weeks earlier were informed that 'Ya Ya Choral' was now 'Zeee Toons'), Tee told Stuart Coupe:

Ya Ya Choral made the mistake of becoming a city band, but we want to play to as many people as possible... We'd prefer to play civic centres rather than pubs because we figure our music is more attuned to young kids

In another interview within the same few weeks, Tee explained the split with Gibson and the decision to change the band's name:

We just got pretty bored with what we were doing - and then Fiona and I decided that we still wanted to work with each other. So we were going to were going to work again as Ya Ya Choral without Patrick 'cos Patrick's ideas and our ideas had since [diverged]... he wants to do more radio plays, and comedy sort of things, and we want to do more pop music, more danceable stuff. And then we decided not to call it Ya Ya Choral because what we were doing had nothing to do with the old YYC, and for the past few months we've been working out things with Paul Abrahams who used to be in the Reels.

== 'Huh?' and 'In Rock' eras ==
Zeee Toons played few shows and do not appear to have lasted beyond the end of 1983. Abrahams, Bliss and Newham did not work with them after this time. However Ya Ya Choral re-emerged in early 1985 in a very different form, typified by Tee much later as their "'Huh?' era'.

In 1983, during the brief Zeee Toons period, Tee had said 'We think what we're doing now is very commercial... and we figure while we're writing these sorts of songs, we ought to try and make as much money as we can, until we move onto something else... So we want to move to Japan.' He added that there was 'no point in going to England'. The mooted move to Japan did not occur, and the next phase of Ya Ya Choral was almost unrecognisable.

Phil Turnbull has written of the mid-1980s version of the group as 'playing a more strident rock and pop sound in the great western Sydney sprawl'. A single, 'Two Lines', presaged a new, rockier outfit and featured Chris Morrow, whose group The Numbers had recently broken up, on guitar. For this single, the group had continued its practice of using a drum machine; by the time of its next release, the five-track mini-album Grunts in 1988, Ya Ya Choral was a five-piece featuring Graham and Tee joined by Dave Kelly (drums), former member of the Systematics Michael Filewood (lead and rhythm guitar) and Joanna Urbanik (bass). One side of the release was recorded live at the Shellharbour Workers Club, in itself, signifying a very different approach for a group which had originated as an electronic pop band in Sydney's inner city. The group reissued this EP with extra tracks as a cassette called Extra Grunt. This period of the band came to be described by Tee as their 'In Rock' era, possibly in reference to the album by Deep Purple. In the same year, the same line-up of Ya Ya Choral released the album One Small Step for Mankind.

In 1989 the group - advertised as a 'mega-heavy Australian five-piece' - toured the UK. Visiting Accrington, the town in which he was born but had left at the age of 7, Tee told the Lancashire Telegraph that while people might call their music heavy metal, 'I describe it as a 1990s version of AC/DC'. He was also quoted saying that the band - which had started in 1982 - was 'formed two years ago' and that it had released two records. The article also describes Graham as Tee's wife, but does not mention that she is a band member. Returning to Australia, in 1990–1991 the group changed its name to Fear of Angels.

== 'The Pop in Our Head' era ==
In the early 1990s Graham and Tee reverted to the name Ya Ya Choral, made demos for Warner Brothers but did not release anything further under that name. They did, however, issue a 6-track CDEP, Interface for Max in Lo-Tec, under the name Ultravelvet in 1994. In 2013 Tee released the duo's final recordings on Bandcamp, under the name Ya Ya Choral, annotating them thus:

The last Ya Ya Choral (Version 4) recording .... After a failed attempt at working with Garth Porter, and wasting heaps of $$$ (those recording[s] are never to see the light of day) 9 months later, these raw and laid back demos were our last recordings for Warners. Our last attempt to fuse Zip Gun era T.Rex structures with earlier YYC pop and MOR directions. And maybe pay back some of the $$000s owed to Warners. Rob Dunne on keys brings more of a 'disco duck' sort of feel to proceedings and the first and last time we ever used MIDI. His samples are lifted from various blood feast movies and 1950s Paul Newman movies. Fiona Graham handles vocals and guitar. Michael Tee lurks in the background vocals and guitar and some keys. These are pretty much start up demos live in the studio with a few overdubs but not final realised productions. I kind of like how they are unfinished. This 3 piece version of the band played live around the Northern Beaches in early 1995. .... Then Tee and Graham went to NYC and UK - but when they came back Ya Ya Choral switched off and I started doing A Cloakroom Assembly again.

Fiona Graham-Coffey (as she had come to be known) died from brain cancer in 2013. Michael Tee, who late in life was more commonly known by his real name Michael Coffey, died in May 2024 from multiple myeloma and amyloidosis. In March the same year he had written that he had 'retired A Cloakroom Assembly as a band' but that he would 'continue to release the quiet stuff as Michael Tee'.
