= Brood (album) =

Studio album by My Friend the Chocolate Cake
- Released: July 1994
- Recorded: July 1993 at Metropolis Audio, Melbourne, July 1993 and Periscope, Melbourne, August–September 1993
- Genre: Australian rock
- Length: 65:31
- Label: Liberation Music
- Producer: Helen Mountfort, David Bridie, Jim Rondinelli

My Friend the Chocolate Cake chronology
My Friend the Chocolate Cake (1991)	Brood (1994)	Good Luck (1996)

Professional ratings
Review scores
Source	Rating
Allmusic	4.5/5 stars

Brood is the second studio album by Melbourne band My Friend the Chocolate Cake. The album was released in July 1994 and peaked at number 32 on the ARIA Chart.

At the ARIA Music Awards of 1995, the album won the ARIA Award for Best Adult Contemporary Album.

== Track listing ==
(All lyrics by David Bridie except where noted; all arrangements by My Friend the Chocolate Cake)

1. "Dance (You Stupid Monster to my Soft Song)" – 2:36
2. "I've Got a Plan" – 3:12
3. "Throwing It Away" – 3:59
4. "Greenkeeping" – 3:27
5. "The Old Years" – 3:46
6. "Song From Under the Floorboards" (music, lyrics by Howard Devoto) – 3:57
7. "Jimmy Stynes" – 3:21
8. "Slow Way to Go Down" – 5:18
9. "Bottom and the Rustics" – 4:23
10. "Rosetta" – 3:49
11. "The Gossip" – 4:18
12. "Brood" – 3:47
13. "Yandoit" – 4:17
14. "The Pramsitters" – 3:12
15. "Aberystwyth" – 4:10
16. "The Red Wallpaper" – 1:40
17. "John Cain Avenue" – 3:43
18. "Low" – 2:28

== Personnel ==
- David Bridie - vocals, piano, harmonium
- Helen Mountfort - cello, backing vocals
- Hope Csutoros - violin, occasional viola and hats
- Andrew Carswell - mandolin, tin whistle, mandola
- Andrew Richardson - acoustic guitar
- Michael Barker - drums, percussion
- Bill McDonald - bass guitar ("Plan", "Old Years", "Song From Under the Floorboards")
- Jim Rondinelli - backing vocals ("The Old Years")

== Chart ==
Chart (1994)	Peak position
Australian Albums (ARIA)	22
