= Telek (album) =

Studio album by George Telek
- Released: 1997
- Label: ORIGiN
- Producer: David Bridie, John Phillips and George Telek

George Telek chronology
Tabaran (1990)	Telek (1997)	Serious Tam (2000)

Telek is the debut studio album by Papua New Guinean musician George Telek.

At the ARIA Music Awards of 1997, the album was nominated for Best World Music Album and Best Indigenous Release, winning the former.

== Reception ==
Lesley Sly of Rolling Stone called the album "a mixed bag of traditional songs, rock and stringband music", saying "Whether in sparse semi-acoustic settings, chanting over pounding and complex percussion, or telling stories in fields of ambience, Telek is compelling." calling the album "One of the best 'world' releases, so far this year."

Bruce Elder of the Sydney Morning Herald said, "The magic of this recording lies in the way it mixes traditional and contemporary sounds. It is a triumphant celebration of the power and beauty of Telek's songwriting and singing." Elder called it "a crime that world music fans in Australia have ignored the music of our immediate area" adding "there is still no truly well-produced recording of the harmonising of choirs from Fiji or the Cook Islands. This marvellous record should go a long way to putting Papua New Guinea on the international music map."

== Track listing ==
1. "Apinpidik"
2. "Go Long We Long Bush" {featuring Archie Roach)
3. "Iamagit"
4. "Waligur Iau"
5. "Desi"
6. "Melbourne City"
7. "iwarwatut Papa"
8. "Lili"
9. "Abebe"
10. "Midal"
11. "Talaigu"
12. "Anoro"
13. "Ririwon"
14. "Unlisted Track"

== Release history ==
Region	Date	Format	Label	Catalogue
Australia	1997	CD	ORIGiN	OR030
