= Serious Tam =

Studio album by George Telek
- Released: 17 July 2000
- Length: 52:57
- Label: ORIGiN
- Producer: David Bridie, Vic Coppersmith-Heaven and George Telek

George Telek chronology
Telek (1997)	Serious Tam (2000)	Arnette (2004)

Serious Tam is the second studio album by Papua New Guinean musician George Telek. The album was released in July 2000. At the ARIA Music Awards of 2001, the album was nominated for ARIA Award for Best World Music Album.

The Times voted the album as 'Best Pop Album of 2000.

== Reception ==
Diana Potts from AllMusic said "Translated, most of the songs on Serious Tam are about the common themes of daily life and passionate love. This a definite global pop album with an ethnic twist. Serious Tam's tribal drum sounds and simplicity will take the listener to a better, more serene place."

Josef Woodard from Jazz Times said "Producer David Bridie brings Telek into popish relief, layering on guitars, backbeats and synth sounds on the album Serious Tam. A singer of no small talents, Telek shows his interest in exploring indigenous roots, but there are genuine Beatlesque roots, as well, and enough echoes of Peter Gabriel to make one wonder about a trickle-down 'company sound' over at Realworld. Most of the lyrics are in the Tolai tongue, Kuanuan and Tok Pisin (Pidgin English) and recount the life of the Tolai people, then and now."

In a review by The Times, the reviewer said "One phenomenal song follows another...Telek's voice on its own is a thing of rare beauty...a magical album".

Li Robbins said "Telek takes the music of Papua New Guinea's Tolai people, and updates it with keyboards, electric bass and guitar, and ambient sounds. The hybrid is for the most part executed with a sure hand, excepting the track Waitpela Gras, where vestiges of prog rock suddenly make an unwelcome visit -- a heavy-handedness sadly all too regular a feature of Realworld recordings. Overall though, it's charming, and sweetly evocative music."

Billboard said "The songs speak of common experiences, love, and magic charms. Once some conventional, and not-so-conventional, Western instrumentation was added to this music, the arrangements emerged as a very appealing traditional/world pop fusion."

== Track listing ==
1. "Midal" - 4:12
2. "Bunaik" - 5:13
3. "To Pol" - 4:05
4. "Serious Tam" - 2:14
5. "Boystown" - 4:48
6. "Iamagit" - 2:35
7. "Barturana (Duke of Yorks)" - 3:10
8. "Tolili" - 2:19
9. "Balamaris" - 4:04
10. "Go Ralom" - 3:43
11. "Tolili Kundu" - 2:27
12. "Waitpela Gras" - 3:02
13. "Lili" - 4:18
14. "Tutana Kuraip" - 2:43
15. "Talaigu" - 2:26
16. "Ririwon" - 1:46
17. "Sori Tru" - 3:31 (Australian only bonus track)
18. "Paska" - 3:22 (Australian only bonus track)
19. "Paliwo" - 3:35 (Australian only bonus track)

== Release history ==
Region	Date	Format	Label	Catalogue
Australia	17 July 2000	CD	ORIGiN	OR055
United States	August 2000	CD	Real World Records	CDRW90
