= Home Improvement =

Home improvement is the process of renovating or adding to a home.

Home Improvement may also refer to:

- Home Improvement (TV series), a 1990s U.S. television sitcom starring Tim Allen
  - Home Improvement: Power Tool Pursuit!, video game based on the TV series
- Home Improvements, a 2007 album by My Friend the Chocolate Cake
- "Home Improvement", an episode of Beavis and Butt-Head
- "Home Improvement", a season 2 episode of The Casagrandes
- "Home Improvements" (Not Going Out), a 2018 television episode
- "Home Improvement" (The Upper Hand), a 1995 television episode
