= Tabaran =

1990 studio album by Not Drowning, Waving

Studio album by Not Drowning, Waving and the Musicians of Rabaul, Papua New Guinea featuring Telek
- Released: 1990
- Recorded: July–September 1988
- Studio: Pacific Gold Studios, Papua New Guinea
- Label: WEA

Not Drowning, Waving albums chronology
Claim (1989)	Tabaran (1990)	Proof (1991)

Telek chronology
Tabaran (1990)	Telek (1997)

Tabaran is a studio album credited to Not Drowning, Waving and the Musicians of Rabaul, Papua New Guinea featuring Telek, released in 1990. At the ARIA Music Awards of 1992, the album was nominated for the ARIA Award for Best Indigenous Release.

== Track listing ==
1. "Tabaran" – 5:02
2. "The Kiap Song" – 4:30
3. "Pila Pila" – 2:21
4. "Sing Sing" – 4:47
5. "Rain" – 3:50
6. "Feast" – 2:30
7. "Boys On the Beach" – 0:54
8. "Blackwater" – 5:50
9. "Abebe" – 2:28
10. "Lapun Man" – 3:20
11. "Up in the Mountains" – 5:19
12. "Azehe" – 2:20
13. "Call Across the Highlands" – 2:21
14. "Funeral Chant" – 3:25

== Charts ==
Chart performance for Tabaran
Chart (1991)	Peak position
Australian Albums (ARIA)	80
