= Trash the Planet =

Studio album by Spy vs. Spy
- Released: November 1989
- Recorded: July–August 1989
- Studios: The Manor, Shipton on Cherwell, England
- Length: 39:06
- Label: WEA
- Producer: Craig Leon

Spy vs. Spy chronology
Xenophobia (Why?) (1988)	Trash the Planet (1989)	Spy File (1991)

Singles from Trash the Planet
- 1. "Hard Times" Released: November 1989; 2. "Clear Skies" Released: February 1990; 3. "Our House" Released: May 1990; 4. "Oceania" Released: October 1990

Trash the Planet is the fourth studio album by Australian rock band Spy vs. Spy, produced by Craig Leon (The Ramones, Blondie) and released through WEA in November 1989.

== Track listing ==
All songs written by Craig Bloxom, Michael Weiley, Cliff Grigg and Russell Thomas

No.	Title	Length
1.	"Hardtimes"	2:51
2.	"What the Future Holds"	4:21
3.	"Take It or Leave It"	4:06
4.	"Our House"	3:24
5.	"Have No Fear"	3:25
6.	"Clear Skies"	3:56
7.	"Trash the Planet"	4:02
8.	"Hooligans"	3:12
9.	"Don't Fall Asleep at the Wheel"	4:17
10.	"A New Start"	2:42
11.	"Oceania"	2:48

== Charts ==
Chart (1989/90)	Peak position
Australian Albums (ARIA)	22

== Release history ==
Country	Date	Label	Format	Catalogue
Australia	November 1989	WEA	LP, CD, Cassette	256920-1, 256920-2, 256920-4
