= George Telek =

Papua New Guinean musician and singer

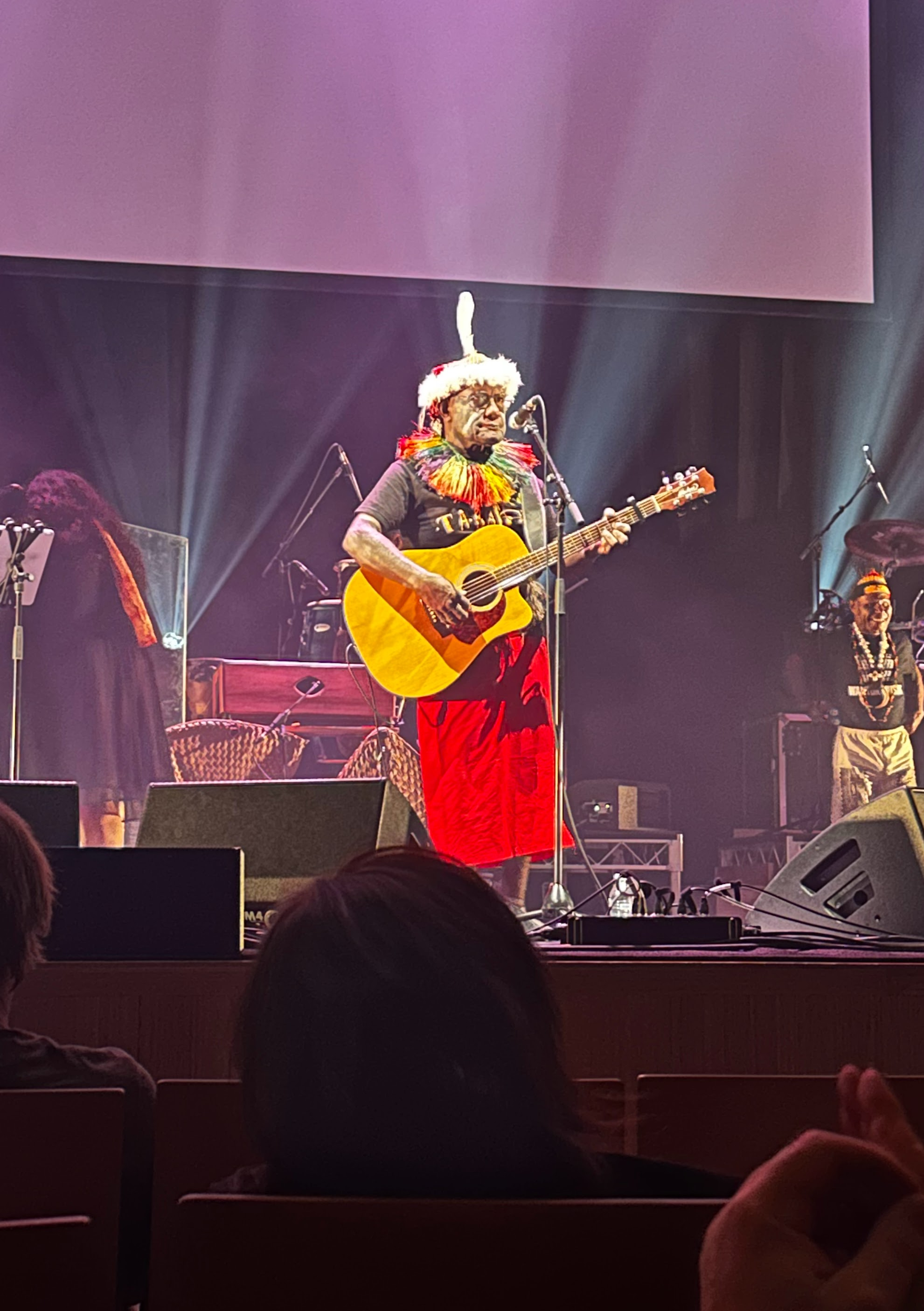
- George Telek performing with Not Drowning, Waving at the Melbourne Recital Centre in September 2025

Background information
- Also known as: Telek
- Born: 1959 (age 66–67); Barovon village, East New Britain Province, Papua New Guinea

George Telek Mamua MBE, commonly known simply as Telek, is a musician and singer from Papua New Guinea. He has won one ARIA Award for this 1997 self-titled album. Telek sings in his native language, Kuanua, and in Tok Pisin. Many of his songs are sung in three-part harmonies that are characteristic of the Tolai.

== Career ==
=== 1959–1995: early years ===
Born in 1959 in Barovon village near Kokopo in East New Britain Province, Telek is one of the few Papua New Guinean singers to gain an international following. Telek sang with various bands in Papua New Guinea early in his career - most notably with the contemporary Tolai group Painim Wok where he was the lead vocalist.

In 1989, Telek met David Bridie of the Australian band Not Drowning, Waving, and they recorded the album Tabaran, which was released in 1990. At the ARIA Music Awards of 1992, the album was nominated for ARIA Award for Best Indigenous Release.

=== 1997–2002: Telek and Serious Tam ===
Telek released his debut solo album, Telek in 1997. At the ARIA Music Awards of 1997, the album won ARIA Award for Best World Music Album.

Telek recorded his second studio album Serious Tam in 2000 at Peter Gabriel's Real World Studios in England. The album was released in July 2000. Telek toured the album across Europe, Australia, United Kingdom and the United States of America. The Times voted the album as 'Best Pop Album of 2000.

In December 2000, Telek was awarded an MBE for services to Papua New Guinea music.

=== 2003–2011: Amette, Matogo and Akave ===
In March 2003, Telek recorded his third studio album, again with David Bridie as producer. The album sees a slight departure from his previous two efforts focusing on the more acoustic side of Telek's writing, featuring a mix of string band, Pacific roots pop and traditional Tolais songs. Amette was released in October 2004.

In 2006, Telek's three studio album were repackaged and rereleased to coincide with an Australian tour with his band The Moab Stringband. This tour featured a range of artists from around the Pacific, including Not Drowning, Waving, Tony Subam, Pius Wasi, Albert David, Djakapurra, Frank Yamma and Airi Ingram.

Whilst in Australia for Sing Sing 2006, The Moab Stringband spent two weeks in David Bridie's studios and recorded the album Matogo. The album comprises 12 stringband tunes as is the first international stringband album to be recorded. The album was released in 2007.

Akave, released in 2010 was described by Limelight Magazine as "balancing respect for traditional village music with just enough technology to satisfy contemporary sensibilities" and as "The pop album of the year" by The Sunday Times UK.

=== 2012–present: A Bit na Ta, Malira and cancer ===
In 2016, Telek again joined with David Bridie for the project A Bit na Ta (Source of the Sea); a multimedia installation based on the lives of the Tolai people. An album of the same name was released. The album was nominated for Best Global/Reggae Act at the 2017 Victorian Music Awards.

In 2018, Telek was diagnosed with mouth cancer. The cancer was successfully removed by a surgeon in Brisbane, and Telek's voice was not affected. He was quoted as saying "I'm okay because they took the tumour from my lips. It didn't go into my mouth, it was just on the outside".

In September 2025, as part of Not Drowning, Waving, Telek released the album Malira. The album came about as the band prepared to play in the Sydney Festival and worked on the tracks that became part of the album. Telek also performed at the Melbourne Recital Centre in September 2025 as part of Not Drowning, Waving.

== Discography ==
=== Albums ===
List of albums, with Australian chart positions
Title	Album details	Peak chart positions
Title	Album details	AUS
Tabaran (credited to Not Drowning, Waving and the Musicians of Rabaul featuring Telek)	Released: 1990; Label: WEA (903172999.2); Format: LP, CD, Cassette	80
Telek	Released: 1997; Label: ORIGiN (OR030); Format: CD	-
Serious Tam	Released: 2000; Label: ORIGiN (OR055); Format: CD	-
Amette	Released: 2004; Label: The Blunt Label / Shock (20047); Format: CD	-
Matogo (with the Moab Stringband)	Released: 2007; Label: Wantok Musik (SV0587); Format: CD	-
Christmas with George Telek and Friends	Released: 2008; Label: CHM Supersound (CHM881); Format: CD, cassette	-
Akave	Released: 2010; Label: Wantok Musik (W0002); Format: CD, Digital download	-
Celebration of a Legend	Released: September 2015; Label: Wantok Musik; Format: CD, Digital download; Note: compilation	-
A Bit Na Ta (with David Bridie and Musicians of the Gunantuna)	Released: 2016; Label: Wantok Musik; Format: CD, Digital download	-
Kambek (I Lilikun Mulai)	Released: October 2022; Label: Wantok Musik; Format: CD, Digital download	-
Malira	Released: September 2025; Format: LP, CD, Digital Download	-

== Awards ==
=== ARIA Music Awards ===
The ARIA Music Awards is an annual awards ceremony that recognises excellence, innovation, and achievement across all genres of Australian music. George Talek has won 1 award from 4 nominations.

Year	Nominee / work	Award	Result
1992	Tabaran (credited to Not Drowning, Waving and the Musicians of Rabaul, Papua New Guinea featuring Telek)	Best Indigenous Release	Nominated
1997	Telek	Best Indigenous Release	Nominated
1997	Telek	Best World Album	Won
2001	Serious Tam	Best World Album	Nominated

=== Music Victoria Awards ===
The Music Victoria Awards are an annual awards night celebrating Victorian music. They commenced in 2006.

Year	Nominee / work	Award	Result	Ref.
2017	A Bit Na Ta (with David Bridie & Musicians of the Gunantuna)	Best Global or Reggae Album	Nominated	
