= My Friend the Chocolate Cake =

Australian musical ensemble

- Origin: Melbourne, Victoria, Australia
- Genres: Chamber pop; pop rock; folk rock; alternative rock
- Years active: 1989–2018 (indefinite hiatus)
- Labels: Warner/East West; White/Mushroom/Festival; Mushroom/Sony; Shock; Liberation
- Spinoff of: Not Drowning, Waving
- Past members: David Bridie; Helen Mountfort; Hope Csutoros; Greg Patten; Dean Addison; Andrew Richardson; Russel Bradley; Andrew Carswell; Michael Barker
- Website: mftcc.com

My Friend the Chocolate Cake were an Australian chamber pop group formed in 1989 by mainstays David Bridie on vocals and keyboards and Helen Mountfort on cello and backing vocals (both ex-Not Drowning, Waving). They have released seven studio albums with two reaching the ARIA Albums Chart top 50, Brood (1993) and Good Luck (1996). These two albums both won the ARIA Award for Best Adult Contemporary Album in 1995 and 1997, respectively.

== History ==
=== 1989–1992: Career beginnings ===
My Friend the Chocolate Cake were formed initially as an acoustic side project in 1989 by David Bridie on vocals, piano, harmonium and keyboards and Helen Mountfort on cello and backing vocals. Bridie and Mountfort were members of an ambient, world music ensemble not drowning, waving. In 1989, Bridie had taken a holiday to New Zealand and had written "a few more breezy compositions" that did not fit into the style of not drowning, waving. Upon return to Melbourne, Mountford joined his project with her own writing.

My Friend the Chocolate Cake took their name from the title of a song by Sydney band Ya Ya Choral. Bridie admitted that one reason they chose an all-acoustic act was so they did not have to carry around amplifiers. Charles Miranda of The Canberra Times observed, "[their] emotive, in some instances ambient tunes, takes you to places you've been to in the past or would like to go to in the future."

Although the intention was to play a handful of shows, the band developed a following after securing a residency at Madigan's, a now-defunct venue in Brunswick. By 1990 Bridie and Mountfort were joined in the group by Russel Bradley on percussion, Andrew Carswell on mandolin, Hope Csutoros on violin and Andrew Richardson on guitar. With a budget of $800, the group released their debut self-titled album, My Friend the Chocolate Cake, in 1992 and it peaked at number 109 on the ARIA Charts in April of that year. It was co-produced by Bridie, Carswell and Mountfort with Tim Cole for Warner/East West. Ian McFarlane, an Australian musicologist, cited music journalist, Bruce Elder's review of the album in Rolling Stone Australia, "one of the best albums of high-art pop ever recorded in Australia." The album's lead single "A Midlife's Tale (Get It Back Now)" peaked at number 134 on the ARIA singles chart.

=== 1993–1997: Brood and Good Luck ===
The group began recording their second studio album in mid-1993, while maintaining performances between not drowning, waving and My Friend the Chocolate Cake. Brood was released in July 1994. McFarlane described how it, "[showed] a more serious aesthetic at work. [It] had been recorded with a generous budget and mixed in New York... [and] featured an intimate, accessible sound that ranged from the uptempo pop of the [second] single 'Throwing It Away' to the gentle ballad 'The Old Years'." Brood peaked at No. 32 on the ARIA Albums Chart. By that time Bradley was replaced by Michael Barker on percussion and drums (ex-Daryl Braithwaite, the Black Sorrows). The lead single, "I've Got a Plan", was released in November 1994. At the ARIA Music Awards of 1995, Brood won the ARIA Award for Best Adult Contemporary Album. Barker was replaced in turn during 1995 by Greg Patten on drums.

My Friend the Chocolate Cake's third album, Good Luck was co-produced by Bridie and Mountfort with Jeremy Allom and was released in 1996. It peaked at No. 44 on the ARIA Albums Chart. McFarlane opined, "among the band's most accomplished and direct statements to date." At the ARIA Music Awards of 1997, it won ARIA Award for Best Adult Contemporary Album. The group played a sell-out show at Edinburgh Festival in Scotland and toured Europe. They followed with a live album, Live at the National Theatre, in December 1997.

=== 1998–2009: Curious and Home Improvements ===
From 1998 the group went into hiatus while Bridie developed an interest in the musical environment of Papua New Guinea and moved there in 2000. Bridie began experimenting with the local string music scene, with a band called Hotel Radio.

In 2000, My Friend the Chocolate Cake's contract with Mushroom Records ended and they decided to represent themselves independently. Gathering in 2002 the group released their fourth studio album, Curious, in May of that year, via Capitol Records. It was co-produced by Bridie, Mountfort and Christian Scallan. It peaked at No. 14 on the ARIA Australasian Artists Albums chart and No. 19 on the related Alternative Albums chart. They followed with another hiatus from 2003.

In 2005 independent Australian label Liberation Music re-released My Friend the Chocolate Cake's back catalogue.

The band resumed recording in 2006 and released their fifth studio album, Home Improvementsin March 2007 – its title refers to its lyrical observations of suburban Australian life, a reoccurring theme in the band's music. The album reached the ARIA Albums Chart top 100.

Andrew Carswell left the band in July 2010 but continued playing with the Americana band The Stetson Family until his untimely death in 2016.

=== 2011–2018: Fiasco and The Revival Meeting ===
In February 2011, the group released "25 Stations", the lead single from their sixth studio album, Fiasco, released in April 2011. Bridie admitting that Carswell's departure had removed a part of their folky element. In May 2014, the band released Best Cake in Show, a compilation of live tracks. In January 2016, the group performed a one-off concert with Archie Roach at the Sydney Opera House.

Their seventh studio album, The Revival Meeting, was self-released in May 2017. In June 2018 the group announced "the upcoming MFTCC shows will be their last shows for some years, as they will be taking an indefinite hiatus to pursue other projects".

== Musical style ==
My Friend the Chocolate Cake's music can be seen to straddle the worlds of ambient and world music, with an emphasis on piano and violin-led acoustic music. The band's collective musical influences are diverse and include: Penguin Cafe Orchestra, Irish and Scottish folk music, Joy Division, Arvo Pärt, and folk / pop / rock performers such as Billy Bragg, Talk Talk, John Cale and Michelle Shocked.

== Television ==
In the 1990s, the song "The Romp" was frequently used on promotional adverts on Australia's ABC channel. A number of the band's songs have appeared in the Australian adolescent television drama Heartbreak High including "Salt", "Your Ship Is Gone" and "Talk About Love". "I've Got a Plan" was used in episodes of the Australian soap opera, Home and Away, broadcast in the UK on 16 March 2012.

== Discography ==
=== Studio albums ===
List of studio albums with chart positions and certifications
Title	Details	Peak chart positions
Title	Details	AUS
My Friend the Chocolate Cake	Released: March 1992; Label: EastWest (903175819-2); Format: CD, cassette	109
Brood	Released: July 1994; Label: White/ Mushroom (D31136); Format: CD, cassette	32
Good Luck	Released: September 1996; Label: White/ Mushroom (TVD93462); Format: CD, cassette	44
Curious	Released: 27 May 2002; Label: EMI Music (7243540166-2); Format: CD	108
Home Improvements	Released: March 2007; Label: Liberation Music (LIBCD9231.2); Format: CD	89
Fiasco	Released: April 2011; Label: Shock Records (MFTCC20); Format: CD, digital download	141
The Revival Meeting	Released: 17 May 2017; Label: My Friend the Chocolate Cake (MFTCC22); Format: CD, DD, LP	—

=== Live album ===
List of live albums with chart positions
Title	Details	Peak chart positions
Title	Details	AUS
Live at the National Theatre	Released: November 1997; Label: Mushroom (MUSH33072.2); Format: CD, CD+VHS	107

=== Compilation album ===
List of compilation album with selected details
Title	Details
Review	Released: 1997; Label: Mushroom (MUSH4CD); Format: CD
19 Easy Pieces	Released: November 1999; Label: My Friend the Chocolate Cake (CC1199M); Format: CD; Note: A collection of song from film soundtracks, theatre, compilations and b-sides.
Parade – The Best Of...	Released: June 2004; Label: Liberation Music; Format: CD
Best Cake in Show	Released: May 2014; Label: My Friend the Chocolate Cake (MFTCC21); Format: CD, DD; Note: A collection of live recordings spanning the bands 25 year career.

=== Singles ===
List of singles, with selected chart positions
Year	Title	Chart positions	Album
Year	Title	AUS	Album
1992	"A Midlife's Tale (Get It Back Now)"	134	My Friend the Chocolate Cake
1994	"Throwing It All Away"	180	Brood
1994	"I've Got a Plan"	140	Brood
1995	"Song from Under the Floorboards"	149	Brood
1996	"Lighthouse Keeper"	150	Good Luck
1996	"Talk About Love"	149	Good Luck
1997	"Your Ship Has Gone"	—	Good Luck (bonus disc)
2003	"Let's Go Walk This Town"	(promo)	Parade – The Best Of...
2006	"Home Improvements"	125	Home Improvements
2011	"25 Stations"	—	Fiasco
2017	"Jeffrey Smart"	—	The Revival Meeting

== Awards ==
=== ARIA Music Awards ===
The ARIA Music Awards is an annual awards ceremony that recognises excellence, innovation, and achievement across all genres of Australian music. My Friend the Chocolate Cake has won 2 awards from 2 nominations.

Year	Nominee / work	Award	Result	Ref.
1995	Brood	Best Adult Contemporary Album	Won	
1997	Good Luck	Best Adult Contemporary Album	Won	
