= Home Improvements =

Studio album by My Friend the Chocolate Cake
- Released: 2007
- Recorded: Enormodome and Newmarket Studios, 2006
- Genre: Australian rock
- Length: 64:57
- Label: Liberation Music
- Producers: Tim Cole, David Bridie

My Friend the Chocolate Cake chronology
Curious (2002)	Home Improvements (2007)

Professional ratings
Review scores
Source	Rating
Sunday Herald Sun	4/5 stars
Sydney Morning Herald	(favorable)
The Australian	3.5/5 stars

Home Improvements is the sixth studio album by Melbourne band My Friend the Chocolate Cake. The album was released in 2007.

== Track listing ==
(All lyrics by David Bridie, song arrangements by My Friend the Chocolate Cake)

1. "Hymn for the Carnies" – 5:14
2. "Home Improvements" – 3:42
3. "She Dreams All Different Colours" – 4:07
4. "Five Sisters" – 5:42
5. "The Weather Coast" (music by Dean Addison, Bridie, Greg Patten) – 5:59
6. "Pentecostal Girl" – 4:15
7. "Opus Lagavulin" (music by Hope Csutoros, Helen Mountfort) – 4:20
8. "Let's Go Walk This Town" – 4:11
9. "Seek" – 4:40
10. "The Forgotten Athletes of Persia" (music by Csutoros, Mountfort) – 3:53
11. "John Patap" (music by Junior Devils Stringband, Bridie) – 2:46
12. "Movement" (music by Mountfort, Addison) – 4:48
13. "This Life Tonight" – 6:29
14. "Malaise" – 4:44

== Personnel ==
- David Bridie – piano, singing, harmonium
- Helen Mountfort – cello, backing vocals
- Hope Csutoros – violin
- Andrew Carswell – mandolin, tin whistle
- Greg Patten – drums, ukulele, bvs
- Dean Addison – double bass
- Andrew Richardson – acoustic guitar

== Charts ==
Chart performance for Home Improvements
Chart (2007)	Peak position
Australian Albums (ARIA)	89
