= Maybe Dolls =

Australian pop music band

- Origin: Sydney, New South Wales, Australia
- Genre: Pop
- Years active: 1991–1993
- Labels: BMG; RCA
- Past members: Annalisse Morrow; Chris Morrow; Paul Wheeler; Tim Powles

Maybe Dolls were a short lived Australian pop music band consisting of siblings Annalisse Morrow (bass guitar, lead vocals) and Chris Morrow (lead guitar, lead vocals). The pair were former members of a power pop group, the Numbers. They had issued a single, "A Five Letter Word", in mid-1980, which reached No. 40 on the Kent Music Report Singles Chart.

== Formation ==
The Morrows formed Maybe Dolls in 1991 in Sydney as a pop music trio with Paul Wheeler on drums (ex-Icehouse). Tim Powles (ex-Venetians) later took over on drums. In July 1992 Chris Morrow reflected on the differences between the two groups, "With our former band, The Numbers, I used to write most of the material. I tended to focus on lyrics and guitar riffs but being a singer Annalisse broadens the songs melodically. Now the voice is serving the lyrics and vice versa — the songs have got both form and content." The Canberra Times' reviewer felt that "Annalisse's unique vocal style — equal parts pixie and banshee — has been enriched by stints singing jazz and blues in small clubs and even some techno-funk dabblings."

Their debut single, "Nervous Kid", was released in August 1991, and reached No. 32 on the ARIA Singles Chart. It was featured in the Australian TV soap opera, E Street. At the ARIA Music Awards of 1992 "Nervous Kid" was nominated for Breakthrough Artist – Single.

A second single, "Cool Jesus", reached No. 31 in February 1992, followed by their only album, Propaganda (2 March 1992), which reached the top 30. To record the album the Morrows were joined in the studio by Paul Gray on keyboards (ex-Wa Wa Nee), Peter Kekel on keyboards (ex-Jimmy Barnes Band), Justin Stanley on keyboards (ex-Noiseworks), and John Watson on drums. Annalise explained that "the songs were written over a three year period so they cover lots of ground. I guess lyrically they're all about applying personal politics to the world outside. A lot of them work on a number of different levels so they sort of keep people guessing what they may be about."

== Break-up ==
After disbanding Annalisse left the music industry and Chris became a design teacher in northern New South Wales. In January 2008 Annalisse told The Sydney Morning Herald's correspondent that "'The one thing I miss is singing,' she says, adding with a laugh, 'And I still can't get used to getting up in the morning... It got to the point where I couldn't listen to anybody singing for quite some time'."

== Discography ==
=== Studio albums ===
List of albums, with Australian chart positions
Title	Album details	Peak chart positions
Title	Album details	AUS
Propaganda	Released: 2 March 1992; Format: CD; Label: BMG	25

=== Singles ===
Year	Title	Peak chart position	Album
Year	Title	AUS	Album
1991	"Nervous Kid"	32	Propaganda
1992	"Cool Jesus"	31	Propaganda
1992	"Never Look Back"	114	Propaganda
1992	"Only Love"	—	Propaganda
1993	"Goodbye"	—	non-album single
"—" denotes a recording that did not chart.

== Awards and nominations ==
=== ARIA Music Awards ===
The ARIA Music Awards is an annual awards ceremony held by the Australian Recording Industry Association. They commenced in 1987.

Year	Nominee / work	Award	Result	Ref.
1992	"Nervous Kid"	Breakthrough Artist - Single	Nominated	
