= The Numbers (band) =

Australian power pop band

- Origin: Sydney, New South Wales, Australia
- Genre: Power pop
- Years active: 1978–1984
- Label: Deluxe
- Members: Graham `Buzz' Bidstrup; John Bliss; Craig Bloxom; Russell Handley; Annalisse Morrow; Chris Morrow; Marty Newcombe; Colin Newham; Marcus Phelan; Gary Roberts; Simon Vidale

The Numbers were an Australian power pop band formed by siblings Annalisse (bass guitar, lead vocals) and Chris Morrow (lead guitar, lead vocals) in early 1978. They issued two studio albums, The Numbers (October 1980), which peaked at No. 29 on the Kent Music Report Albums Chart, and 39.51 (April 1982). The group disbanded in 1984; the Morrows formed another band, Maybe Dolls, in 1991.

== History ==
The Numbers were formed early in 1978 in Sydney by Annalisse Morrow on bass guitar and lead vocals and her elder brother, Chris Morrow on lead guitar and lead vocals; they were joined by Marty Newcombe on drums. Australian musicologist, Ian McFarlane, observed that they "emerged from the post-punk Sydney scene with a clean sound and a strong sense of direction. In spite of a regular touring schedule and a brace of accessible pop releases, the band never made the commercial breakthrough for which they so vigorously strived."

In January 1979 Newcombe was replaced on drums and percussion by Simon Vidale. The group supported the Australian leg of a tour by British group XTC. The Numbers released their debut three-track, extended play, Govt. Boy, on the Local Records label in September. All the tracks were written or co-written by Chris. McFarlane writes that it "featured three dazzling blasts of tough guitar pop reminiscent of The Jam or The Buzzcocks."

Late in 1979 the group signed with Deluxe Records, which issued their debut single, "The Modern Song", the following March. The second single, "Five Letter Word", reached the Kent Music Report Singles Chart top 40. A third single, "Mr President" (February 1981) failed to chart. Their debut album, The Numbers, appeared in October 1980, and reached No. 29 on the Kent Music Report Albums Chart. It was produced by Cameron Allan and was recorded at EMI Studios 301, Sydney in mid-year. The album was issued in Britain the following year with one additional track, "Jericho".

In 1981, The Numbers had devolved to the Morrow siblings only. In his autobiography No Secrets, Graham "Buzz" Bidstrup writes:

The Numbers were a young quirky unit featuring Annalisse Morrow on vocals and bass and her songwriting brother, Chris, playing some great guitar... Cameron had produced their debut album... but Deluxe label boss (and former AC/DC manager) Michael Browning asked me if I would do the second. Chris had written a bunch of really good new power pop-style songs and I knew Annalisse was a solid bass player, so I was keen. At the time, they didn't have a drummer.

Bidstrup provided additional instrumentation, including drums, on this second album. He relates the story that the album's title, 39.51, was a response to critics who had claimed the 28-minute debut album was too short. He writes "It was hard not to feel a bit guilty when it didn't really shake up the charts, but the single 'Big Beat' got a nice bit of airplay, at least." The album also included a re-recorded version of the song "Jericho", which was also issued as a single as was the song "Alone".

The Numbers broke up in 1983. Annalisse moved to Perth. In 1985, Chris recorded a single with Ya Ya Choral and in 1987, released a solo single, "Just What I Needed". In 1988, the Morrows began working together again, leading to the formation of Maybe Dolls.

== Members ==
- Graham `Buzz' Bidstrup
- John Bliss
- Craig Bloxom
- Russell Handley
- Annalisse Morrow
- Chris Morrow
- Marty Newcombe
- Colin Newham
- Marcus Phelan
- Gary Roberts
- Simon Vidale

== Discography ==
=== Studio albums ===
List of albums, with Australian chart positions
Title	Album details	Peak chart positions
Title	Album details	AUS
The Numbers	Released: October 1980; Label: DeLuxe (103546)	29
39.51	Released: May 1982; Label: DeLuxe (103637)	92

=== Compilations ===
Title	Details
Numerology	Released: 2007; Label: Aztec Music

=== Extended plays ===
Title	Details
Govt. Boy	Released: September 1979; Label: Local Records (Local 3)

=== Singles ===
List of singles, with Australian chart positions
Year	Title	Peak chart positions
Year	Title	AUS
1980	"The Modern Song"/"Take Me Away"	47
1980	"Five Letter Word"/"Alone"	40
1981	"Mr President"/"Private Eye"/"Guerilla"	-
1982	"Jericho"/"Turn Back"	-
1982	"Big Beat"/"Telephone"	-
1982	"Dreams from Yesterday"/"Again"	-

== Awards and nominations ==
=== TV Week / Countdown Awards ===
Countdown was an Australian pop music TV series on national broadcaster ABC-TV from 1974–1987, it presented music awards from 1979–1987, initially in conjunction with magazine TV Week. The TV Week / Countdown Awards were a combination of popular-voted and peer-voted awards.

Year	Nominee / work	Award	Result
1980	Annalise Morrow (The Numbers)	Most Popular Female Performer	Nominated
