= Not Drowning, Waving =

Australian musical ensemble

- Not Drowning, Waving after a 2025 concert at the Melbourne Recital Centre

Background information
- Origin: Melbourne, Victoria, Australia
- Genres: Rock, ambient, world
- Years active: 1983–1994, 2001, 2003, 2005–2006, 2025–present
- Labels: Rampant, East West, WEA, Mighty Boy, Reprise, Liberation, Rogue's Gallery, White, Mushroom
- Spinoffs: My Friend the Chocolate Cake
- Past members: see Members section below

Not Drowning, Waving (styled as not drowning, waving) are a musical group formed in Melbourne, Australia, in 1983 by David Bridie and John Phillips. Their music combines elements of rock, ambient music and world music; their lyrics deal with characteristically Australian topics: word-pictures of landscapes and people, the seasons, and some political issues – such as Indonesia's invasion of East Timor. The group have released six studio albums and two soundtracks before disbanding in 1994. They have briefly reformed in 2001, 2003, 2005–2006 and 2025–present. From 2005 to 2007, they issued three compilation albums. Not Drowning, Waving won the ARIA Award for Best Independent Release at the ARIA Music Awards of 1992 for Proof, their soundtrack for the 1991 film of the same name. In 1991, Bridie and fellow members of Not Drowning, Waving, formed a side-project, My Friend the Chocolate Cake, to play more acoustic-based material. In 2025, Not Drowning, Waving again reformed, with George Telek, to produce a series of live shows and a new studio album, Malira.

== History ==
=== 1983–1985: Beginnings and Another Pond ===
Not Drowning, Waving were formed in Melbourne, Australia, in 1983 by David Bridie and John Phillips. Bridie and Phillips are trained in classical music and met when Bridie, on keyboards, was composing a track, "Moving Around", and asked Phillips to provide guitar. Their name is derived from Stevie Smith's poem "Not Waving but Drowning". Rowan McKinnon soon joined on bass guitar and they recorded "Moving Around" with a drum machine. Other atmospheric instrumentals were recorded at LaTrobe University's music department studio. "Moving Around" was released as their debut single in April 1984 on the Rampant Records label. Tim Cole on vocals and Russel Bradley on drums joined the group. Another Pond was released in January 1985. In September 1985, the band released a dance single, "Mr Pooh, (Do Be a Don't Be)".

=== 1986–1992 :The Little Desert, Cold and the Crackle, Claim and Tabaran ===
Not Drowning, Waving's second album, The Little Desert, was released in January 1986. Bridie and Phillips also worked on the soundtrack for Canoe Man, a documentary about canoe makers from Manus Island, Papua New Guinea. Their work resulted in a six-track extended play (EP), The Sing Sing, which was released in June. Other members of Not Drowning, Waving have included Penny Hewson and Andrew Carswell.

In June 1987, the band released their third studio album, Cold and the Crackle, which was followed in December 1987 with an EP, I Did, recorded with Robby Douglas Turner on vocals. By 1989, Not Drowning, Waving left Rampant Records and signed with Mighty Boy to issue their fourth album, Claim, in May. The album was voted Best Australian Album on the Australian Rolling Stone Critics Poll in 1989. In 1989, Bradley, Bridie and Mountfort formed a side project, My Friend the Chocolate Cake, as an acoustic music group after Bridie took a holiday in New Zealand and wrote a collection of songs that did not fit into the Not Drowning, Waving style.

Later in 1989, the group visited Papua New Guinea, playing several concerts and meeting George Telek (Moab Stringband, Painim Wok) with whom they later recorded two tracks for their next album, Tabaran, which was released late in 1990. Tabaran was credited to Not Drowning, Waving and the Musicians of Rabaul, Papua New Guinea Featuring Telek. Helen Mountfort joined on cello in 1990 and they covered the Reels' track "Kitchen Man" for a various artists' album, Used and Recovered By (1990). Not Drowning, Waving recorded the soundtrack for the 1991 film Proof which was released in April 1992.

In May 1992, they were the support act for David Byrne at the State Theatre in Sydney, Australia, playing: Palau, Amidel, The Kiap Song, Crazy Birds, Willow Tree, Terra Nullius, Albert Namatjira, The Migrant and Sing Sing.

At the ARIA Music Awards of 1992, Tabaran was nominated for ARIA Award for Best Indigenous Release, while Proof won ARIA Award for Best Independent Release.

=== 1993–1994: Circus and break up ===
In 1993, the group released their sixth studio album, Circus, which was recorded at the Rockfield Studios in Wales and produced by Hugh Jones.

In 1994, they were the support act for Peter Gabriel on his first tour of Australia. Late in the year, Bridie and Montfort recorded the soundtrack for the film Hammers Over the Anvil, they used Jen Anderson on violin (ex-The Black Sorrows) and the horn section from Hunters & Collectors. It was released in 1994 as Hammers under the name Not Drowning, Waving. The group disbanded in 1994, while Bridie and Mountfort continued with their offshoot venture, My Friend the Chocolate Cake.

=== 2001–present: Reunions and Malira ===
In November 2001, a short reunion of Not Drowning, Waving – consisting of Bradley, Bridie, Mountfort, Phillips and Southall in the line-up – occurred at the Corner Hotel in Richmond for the book launch of Blunt: A Biased History of Australian Rock.

In February 2003, they reunited again for the Morning Star Concert for West Papua at the Melbourne Concert Hall.

Another reunion, for several months, started in March 2005 when the band, together with Telek, performed twice at the 2005 WOMADelaide festival. Several other performances followed – at the 10th Fest'Napuan in Port Vila, Vanuatu, the Corner Hotel and the Northcote Social Club. The band's final show with the full lineup took place at Festival Melbourne 2006 at the Alexandra Gardens, a free concert for Melbourne's Commonwealth Games celebrations on 25 March 2006. During this time they issued two compilation albums, Through the One Last Door – Best Of (2005) and Maps for Sonic Adventurers (2006). A live album of performances from 1986 to 2005 was released as Live (At the Butchers' Picnic) in 2007.

In January 2025, Not Drowning Waving and George Telek performed for "one night only" at the Sydney Festival to celebrate the 35th anniversary of their album Tabaran. In September 2025, coinciding with the 50th anniversary of Papua New Guinea independence, they performed the Tabaran show at the Melbourne Recital Centre.

In September 2025, Not Drowning, Waving released a new studio album, Malira, a set of tracks which arose from playing together to rehearse for Tabaran live shows. George Telek is credited as a member of Not Drowning, Waving for the album, along with PNG-based musicians Ben Hakalitz (drums) and Pius Wasi (bamboo flute). Malira was recorded at various studios across Australia and Papua New Guinea, including samples from local musicians in PNG and Vanuatu. The album notes describe it as "not Tabaran version two but something different", noting that the album release coincided with celebrations of the 50th anniversary of Papua New Guinea's independence.

In 2026 Not Drowning, Waving did a mini Australian tour.

== Members ==
Band members have included:

- Russel Bradley – drums, percussion (1987–1993, 1996, 2025)
- David Bridie – piano, keyboards, vocals (1983–1993, 1996, 2001, 2003, 2005–2006, 2025)
- Amanda Brotchie – vocals (1985–1987)
- Andrew Carswell – mandolin
- Tim Cole – vocals, producer, engineer (1984–1992, 1996)
- Phillip Flinker – (1984–1987)
- Darren Geraghty – (1984–1987)
- Penny Hewson – acoustic guitar
- Rowan McKinnon – bass guitar, guitar (1984–1993, 1996, 2025)
- Helen Mountfort – cello, vocals (1989–1993, 1996, 2025)
- John Phillips – guitar, samples, sounds (1983–1993, 1996, 2001, 2003, 2005–2006, 2025)
- Tanya Plack – flute (1985–1986)
- Jaqui Rutten – vocals (1984–1987)
- Tanya Smith – keyboards (1984–1987)
- James Southall – percussion (1987–1993, 1996)
- Phillip Wale – cello (1985–1986)
- Ben Hakalitz - drums, garamut, kundus (2025)
- George Telek - vocals (2025)
- Pius Wasi - bamboo flute (2025)

== Discography ==
=== Studio albums ===
List of albums, with selected details and chart positions
Title	Album details	Peak chart positions
Title	Album details	AUS
Another Pond	Released: January 1985; Label: Rampant Releases (RR010); Format: LP	—
The Little Desert	Released: January 1986; Label: Rampant Releases (RR020); Format: LP, cassette	—
Cold and the Crackle	Released: June 1987; Label: Rampant Releases (RR040); Format: LP, cassette	—
Claim	Released: May 1989; Label: Mighty Boy (MBLP7012/MBCD7012); Format: LP, CD	80
Tabaran (credited to Not Drowning, Waving and the Musicians of Rabaul, Papua New Guinea, featuring George Telek)	Released: 1990; Label: WEA (903172999.2); Format: LP, CD	80
Circus	Released: 1993; Label: White / Mushroom (D31029); Format: CD	64
Malira	Released: September 2025; Label: Origin / Wantok (D31029); Format: LP, CD, digital	77

=== Soundtracks ===
List of soundtracks with selected details
Title	Details
Proof	Released: 1991; Label: Rogues Gallery (RG001); Format: CD
Hammers	Released: 1994; Label: Rampant Releases (RG002); Format: CD

=== Compilation and remix albums ===
List of compilation and remix albums with selected details
Title	Details
Follow the Geography: A Compilation	Released: 1993; Label: White / Mushroom (D30998); Format: LP
Through the One Last Door	Released: 2005; Label: Bloodlines; Format: CD, digital download
Maps for Sonic Adventurers	Released: 2006; Label: Liberation Blue (BLUE118.2); Format: CD, digital download; Note: Remixes
Live at the Butchers' Picnic	Released: September 2007; Label: self-released; Format: digital download; Note: Compilation of live recordings between 1987 and 2005. Limited to 50 copies

=== Extended plays ===
List of extended plays with selected details
Title	Details
The Sing Sing	Released: June 1986; Label: Rampant Releases (MLRR005); Format: LP
I Did (with Robby Douglas Turner)	Released: 1987; Label: Rampant Releases (RR050); Format: LP

=== Singles ===
Year	Title	Album
1984	"Hunting for Nuggets"	Another Pond
1984	"Moving Around"	non-album singles
1985	"Do Be a Don't Be (Mr Pooh)"	non-album singles
1989	"Willow Tree" / "Claim"	Claim
1989	"Fishing Trawler"	Claim
1991	"Pila Pila"	Tabaran
1991	"Blackwater"	Tabaran
1991	"The Kiap Song"	Tabaran
1993	"Spark"	Circus
1993	"Penmon"	Circus

== Awards ==
=== ARIA Music Awards ===
The ARIA Music Awards is an annual awards ceremony that recognises excellence, innovation, and achievement across all genres of Australian music. Not Drowning, Waving has won one award from seven nominations.

Year	Nominee / work	Award	Result
1990	Claim	Best Adult Contemporary Album	Nominated
1992	Proof	Best Independent Release	Won
1992	Proof	Best Original Soundtrack / Cast / Show Recording	Nominated
1992	Tabaran	Best Indigenous Release	Nominated
1994	Circus	Best Indigenous Release	Nominated
2007	Maps for Sonic Adventures	Best World Music Album	Nominated
2026	Malira	Best World Music Album	Won
