= Good Luck (My Friend the Chocolate Cake album) =

Studio album by My Friend the Chocolate Cake
- Released: September 1996
- Studio: Periscope Studios
- Label: Mushroom Records
- Producer: David Bridie, Helen Mountfort, Jeremy Allom

My Friend the Chocolate Cake chronology
| Brood (1994) | Good Luck (1996) | Live at the National Theatre (1997) |

Good Luck is the third studio album by Melbourne band My Friend the Chocolate Cake. The album was released in September 1996 and peaked at number 44 on the ARIA Charts.

At the ARIA Music Awards of 1997 the album won the ARIA Award for Best Adult Contemporary Album.

== Track listing ==
1. "Good Luck" - 3:15
2. "Lighthouse Keeper" - 4:11
3. "Salt" - 4:54
4. "100 Flowers in Bloom" - 2:45
5. "The Kitsch Parade" - 3:42
6. "Vandorlo" - 3:31
7. "Talk About Love" - 3:08
8. "Sirens" - 5:49
9. "Cello Song for Charlie" - 3:13
10. "Your Ship Has Gone" - 3:10
11. "Young Girls" - 2:29
12. "Algeria..." - 2:25
13. "Can't Find Love" - 3:11
14. "G-B" - 2:01

== Chart ==
| Chart (1996) | Peak position |
|---|---|
| Australian Albums (ARIA) | 44 |
