= Spy vs. Spy (band) =

Australian ska/pub rock band

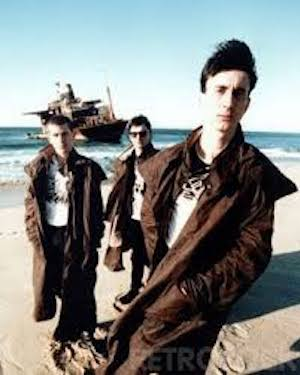
- L to R: Cliff Grigg, Michael Weiley and Craig Bloxom in July, 1986

Background information
- Also known as: Spy vs Spy; SPY v SPY; the Drug Grannies; the Spies/Spys
- Origin: Sydney, New South Wales, Australia
- Genres: Ska, pub rock, reggae
- Years active: 1981–2003, 2026–present
- Labels: Green; Starcall; Powderworks; WEA
- Members: Craig Bloxom; Bob Spencer; Paul Elliott; Justin Ngariki
- Past members: Cliff Grigg; Michael Weiley

v.Spy v.Spy, also known as Spy vs. Spy or SPY v SPY, are an Australian pub rock band formed in 1981. They became known for tackling political issues through their music, including racism, homelessness and contemporary drug culture. The band's initial line-up was the trio of Craig Bloxom on bass guitar and lead vocals, Cliff Grigg on drums and percussion, and Michael Weiley on lead guitar and vocals. Spy vs. Spy's early music was indie rock, which became more straightforward hard rock. Their debut studio album Harry's Reasons was released via Powderworks in February 1986. They switched to WEA and reached No. 31 in February 1987 on the Australian singles chart with "Don't Tear It Down". While the associated album A.O. Mod. TV. Vers. peaked at No. 12 on the related albums chart. Spy vs. Spy's third album, Xenophobia (Why?), was issued in March 1988 and reached No. 15. Their 1989 album Trash the Planet peaked at No. 22 on the ARIA Charts. Cliff Grigg left the band in 1991, and was replaced on drums by Mark Cuffe. The group disbanded in 2003 after Craig Bloxom relocated to the United States. Michael Weiley died in 2018.

As of 2026 they have reformed, with Craig Bloxom joined by Bob Spencer and Paul Elliott on guitars, and Justin Ngariki on drums.

== History ==
Spy vs. Spy were formed in 1981 in Sydney. Their lead vocalist, bass guitarist, Craig Bloxom, was born on 31 July 1959 in Los Angeles and, with his family, moved to Australia in August 1965. He met guitarist-vocalist Michael Weiley at Nelson Bay High School in 1976. Weiley, having migrated from England to Australia, was paired with Bloxom by the principal based on their common musical interests. After secondary education, Bloxom and Weiley moved to Cammeray in Sydney's north shore, playing in various local bands. One of Bloxom's ex-bandmates introduced them to a drummer, Cliff Grigg, who was from Northern Territory and lived in a squat in the inner suburb of Glebe. They named their band after the Spy vs. Spy comics published in Mad magazine. As a rent-saving device Bloxom and Weiley also moved into Grigg's squat, which initially had no roof: it became their rehearsal space.

Spy vs. Spy's first performance was at Sydney's Sussex Hotel, substituting for the Fast Cars, whose singer had taken ill. The band developed a following for their ska-influenced rock music. The group toured indigenous communities in rural New South Wales during 1981. Dirty Pool management picked them up and the group performed at Sydney venues, particularly the Trade Union Club where they supported INXS. They also supported international acts the Clash at the Capitol Theatre and U2 at the Sydney Entertainment Centre. The band's first single, "Do What You Say", was recorded at T.R.M. in Surry Hills, which was released in April 1982 on the independent, Green label. It was followed by their four-track debut extended play (EP), Four Fresh Lemons in August, the 1,000 pressings sold out in five days. Australian musicologist Ian McFarlane described their early recordings, "[they] displayed a strong ska inflection which found the band instant favour amongst the rude boys who packed into Sydney pubs". The New Zealand release of Six Fresh Lemons, combined the four Australian EP's tracks with the A & B sides of their debut single. These were issued under the name Spy vs. Spy, but the band were forced to change it to v.Spy v.Spy to avoid legal action from the publishers of Mad.

The band became prominent on the pub rock scene, performing high energy songs dealing with social issues: racism of any kind (particularly that against Indigenous Australians), drug addiction, homelessness, homophobia, sexual assault, child abuse and domestic violence. They were telling "stories polite Australia didn't necessarily want told." Early in 1983 the band broke up; Bloxom briefly joined the Numbers in March but re-formed Spy vs. Spy in July, with Marcus Phelan (ex-the Numbers) joining as a second guitarist. With Phelan's addition, "ska had been dropped for a more straight-ahead rock attack." Their music suited Australian pub audiences, who listened to AC/DC, the Angels, Lime Spiders, Rose Tattoo and Radio Birdman. During 1983 Weiley became seriously ill with hepatitis and was confined to a hospital bed for months, which periodically debilitated him thereafter. Second guitarist, Phelan left late that year after the band's equipment was stolen.

Gary Morris, talent manager for Midnight Oil, took on Spy vs. Spy. Midnight Oil's label, Powderworks Records, released their five-track EP Meet Us Inside in October 1984, which was followed by the single "One of a Kind" in November. Its music video was filmed outside the MV Sygna shipwreck near Stockton Beach. The band's first full-length album, Harry's Reasons, was released in March 1986 on Powderworks and was produced by Leszek Karski. Singles included "Injustice" (August 1985), about the plight of Australia's Aboriginal communities (dedicated to the Aboriginal Arts Council), "Give Us Something" (February 1986) dealing with the media and "Harry's Reasons" (May), about heroin addiction ("Harry" is a euphemism for heroin). The album reached the top 50 while two singles peaked in the top 100 of the Kent Music Report's charts. McFarlane felt the album was "much stronger with a clear socio-political focus".

The trio switched labels, signing with WEA, and released their second studio album A.O. Mod. TV. Vers. in November 1986. The name is an abbreviation for "Adults Only Modified Television Version", a common censorship notification appearing on Australian television programmes, at that time. It provided three singles – "Don't Tear It Down" inspired by the Department of Main Roads' endeavour to demolish the band's Darling Street squat, "Sallie-Anne'" about murdered prostitute-whistleblower Sallie-Anne Huckstepp and "Credit Cards", a commentary on spiralling debt and consumerism. "Credit Cards" also highlighted the national debate on the introduction of a national identification card, the Australia Card. "Don't Tear It Down" was the band's highest charting single, peaking at No. 31 in February 1987, it stayed in the charts for 20 weeks attaining Gold accreditation for 35,000 units shipped.

After touring the A.O. Mod. TV. Vers. album, WEA demanded another album. The third album, Xenophobia (Why?), was written and recorded in six weeks, its title inspired by racism surfacing in the lead-up to Australia's Bicentennial year of 1988. The album was issued in March 1988 and peaked at No. 15 in Australia, it was produced by Karski and Guy Gray. WEA released it internationally in 14 countries. It provided three singles, "Forget About the Working Week", "Clarity of Mind" and "Waiting". During this time the band played smaller venues to dedicated fans in Sydney under the pseudonym, the Drug Grannies. In 1989 the band received a substantial advance from their record label and travelled to England to record their next studio album Trash the Planet, at Richard Branson's Manor House studios, which was produced by Craig Leon. McFarlane felt its their "most refined and cohesive release." It was issued in November 1989 and peaked at No. 22 on the ARIA albums chart. Four singles were issued – "Hardtimes", "Clear Skies" in February 1990, "Our House" in May and "Oceania" in October. "Hardtimes" reached the top 60, but the others did not appear on the top 100.

Grigg quit the band in late 1991, joining Mixed Relations as guest percussionist, whilst Bloxom and Weiley took a year off performing. In Noosa Heads, Queensland the pair removed themselves from "drugs, alcohol and destructive friendships" in Sydney. According to Bloxom, "`I got baptised in the name of Jesus and something really weird happened _ I got out of the tank and started speaking in tongues. It blew me right out". The duo also auditioned new drummers. Mark Cuffe joined on drums and vocals.

Spy vs. Spy signed a deal with Sony Music Australia. In May 1993 they released their fifth album, Fossil, produced by Karski and Peter Cobbin, which provided the singles "Comes a Time" in March 1993 and "One Way Street" in June. The Age's Nicole Brady observed, that their changing sound has a "new emphasis on gentler vocals, [which] has made their music more accessible." Bloxom reflected, "We don't need to be a cock-rock kind of culture. We've got a myriad of musical styles". Due to the influence of Australian surfers in Brazil, local DJs had played pirated tapes of the group's performances over local radio. The band had developed a local fanbase, which resulted in Brazilian tours to their biggest audiences. Brazil remained the band's strongest market. In 1993 they were heard in two episodes of The Big Backyard, a weekly radio programme promoting Australian music, sponsored by the Department of Foreign Affairs and Trade for broadcast on college radio stations in the United States and Canada - this gave the band a spike in interest in North America.

By 1994 Spy vs. Spy had split up again with members pursuing varied projects. Bloxom and Cuffe formed a band, Shock Poets, while Weiley worked on his side-project, the Honey Island Project, with producer Danny Bryan. Spy vs. Spy reformed in 1996. Cuffe left to concentrate full-time on Shock Poets and was replaced by Australian drummer Paul Wheeler (ex-Icehouse), In November 1999, Festival Records issued a compilation album, Mugshot: The Best of... which included five previously unreleased tracks. By 2000 Bloxom was training as apprentice chef in Newcastle, New South Wales, but still performing with the group. Bloxom played his final gig with the group in Sydney in 2003 before leaving Australia for the US and then settling in Mexico as a chef. Bloxom later returned to Australia to reside in Newcastle.

Cuffe and Weiley reformed the Spys in 2006, gigging for over a decade with various line-ups, but not releasing any new recordings. Weiley died on 29 September 2018, after being diagnosed with cancer.

Post-Weiley Spys

Following Weiley's passing Grigg established a new group under the name Spy v Spy. An album titled New Reasons was released in 2021. In March 2023 Grigg replaced the entire band with new members. Grigg continued touring with this band until early 2025.

In 2019 Craig Bloxom started playing music again, initially in a duo with Newcastle guitarist Richie Lara. In September 2023 Bloxom announced the formation of a new touring band called ReggaeSPYS (or RSPYS) reinterpreting songs from the 1981-1993 era in a style he dubbed "mongrel reggae". In July 2024 ReggaeSPYS issued an album titled Unity Gain, featuring 16 re-imagined songs and one new composition, the lead single "RUOK?" In August 2024 Craig Bloxom’s ReggaeSPYS toured Brazil in support of fellow Australian groups Hoodoo Gurus and Ganggajang.

In March 2025 it was revealed that the former members of Weiley's Spys were booked to play a concert in honour of Weiley in Brazil. However, without the band's knowledge the event was promoted in Brazil as a Spy vs Spy concert. The tour was cancelled by the band when they found out.

In April 2025 a legal dispute began between Grigg and Bloxom when Grigg's management company issued a Cease and Desist letter over Bloxom's use of the band name.

In March 2026 Craig Bloxom announced that ReggaeSPYS were on hiatus and he was forming a new band to play Spy vs Spy material in the original style to celebrate the 40th anniversary of Harry's Reasons.

== Members ==
- Craig Bloxom – bass guitar, vocals (1981–1983, 1984–2003, 2026–present)
- Bob Spencer – guitar (2026-present)
- Paul Elliott – guitar (2026-present)
- Justin Ngariki – drums, percussion (2026-present)
- Cliff Grigg – drums, percussion (1981–1983, 1984–1991)
- Michael Weiley – guitar, vocals (1981–1983, 1984–2003, died 2018)
- Marcus Phelan – guitar (1983)
- Mark Cuffe – drums, guitar, backing vocals (1992–1997)
- Paul Wheeler – drums (1999–2003)
- Richard Coleman – drums (1997–1998)

== Discography ==
=== Studio albums ===
List of studio albums, with selected details, selected chart positions
Title	Details	Peak chart positions
Title	Details	AUS
Harry's Reasons	Released: 10 February 1986; Label: Powderworks (POW6106); Format: LP	7 (Note: Harry's Reasons originally peaked at number 42 in 1986. It peaked at number 7 in 2026 following a vinyl reissue.)
A.O. Mod. TV. Vers.	Released: December 1986; Label: WEA (254458-1); Format: LP	8 (Note: A.O. Mod. TV. Vers. originally peaked at number 12 in 1986. It peaked at number 8 in 2026 following a vinyl reissue.)
Xenophobia (Why?)	Released: March 1988; Label: WEA (255349-1); Format: LP, cassette	15
Trash the Planet	Released: November 1989; Label: WEA (256920-1); Format: LP, CD, cassette	22
Fossil	Released: May 1993; Label: Sony (473606-2); Format: CD, cassette	—

=== Live albums ===
List of live albums, with selected details, selected chart positions
Title	Details	Peak chart positions
Title	Details	AUS
Feito Na Praia	Released: 2000; Label: Tronador (TMSS12); Format: CD, digital	—
Demolition Live - The Hottest Place in Town	Released: 2001; Label: Unofficial (1905485-2); Format: CD, digital download; Note: Live early 1980s at various Sydney venues	—
Live in Caringbah 1981	Released: 2020; Label: Laneway; Format: Digital	—
Live at the Prince of Wales 1984	Released: 2021; Label: ARCA; Format: Digital; Note: Australian Road Crew Association's Desk Tape Series	83

=== Compilation albums ===
List of compilation albums, with selected details, selected chart positions
Title	Details	Peak chart positions
Title	Details	AUS
Spy File: The Best Of	Released: 1991; Label: EastWest (903175649-2); Format: CD	85
Mugshots: The Best Of	Released: 1999; Label: Festival (D26388); Format: CD, digital download	—
The Early Cases	Released: 2002; Label: Tronador (TMCL01); Format: CD, digital download	—
Demolition I - Squat	Released: 2004; Label: Tronador (TMDEMO1-2); Format: CD; Note: Early demos, recordings	—
Demolition II - Rough Heads	Released: 2004; Label: Tronador (TMDEMO2-2); Format: CD; Note: Early demos, recordings	—
Demolition	Released: 2004; Label: Tronador (TMCL06); Format: 3xCD box set of Demolition albums	—
The 1981 Demos	Released: 2020; Label: Laneway; Format: Digital	

=== Extended plays ===
List of extended plays, with selected details and selected chart positions
Title	Details	Peak chart positions
Title	Details	AUS
Four Fresh Lemons	Released: 1982; Label: Green (LRM111); Format: LP; Note: Limited edition of 1000 copies	—
Six Fresh Lemons	Released: 1982; Label: Stunn (MIST 103); Format: LP; Note: Four Fresh Lemons + "Do What You Say"	—
Meet Us Inside	Released: October 1984; Label: Starcall (SMK1 0501)/Powderworks (POW 7002); Format: LP	—
Because Bootlegger e.p.	Released: September 1993; Label: Sony (6595351); Format: CD	193

=== Singles ===
List of singles, with selected chart positions, showing year released and album name
Title	Year	Peak chart positions	Album
Title	Year	AUS	Album
"Do What You Say"/"Table Tea and Mix"	1982	—	Non-album single
"One of a Kind"	1984	66	Meet Us Inside
"Injustice"	1985	87	Harrys Reasons?
"Harry's Reasons"	1986	—	Harrys Reasons?
"Something"	1986	65	Harrys Reasons?
"Don't Tear it Down"	1986	31	A.O. Mod. TV. Vers.
"Sallie-Anne"	1987	64	A.O. Mod. TV. Vers.
"Credit Cards"	1987	—	A.O. Mod. TV. Vers.
"Forget About the Working Week"	1987	44	Xenophobia [Why?]
"Clarity of Mind"	1988	—	Xenophobia [Why?]
"Waiting"	1988	—	Xenophobia [Why?]
"Hardtimes"	1989	59	Trash the Planet
"Clear Skies"	1990	103	Trash the Planet
"Our House"	1990	119	Trash the Planet
"Oceania"	1990	—	Trash the Planet
"Stand Out" b/w "Troubled Waters (A Song for Somalia)" by Quick and the Dead	1993	122	Fossil
"Comes a Time"	1993	117	Fossil
"One Way Street"	1993	—	Fossil
