= Harry's Reasons =

Studio album by v. Spy v. Spy
- Released: 10 February 1986
- Recorded: 1985
- Studios: Trafalgar Studios, Albert Studios
- Genre: Rock
- Label: Powderworks
- Producers: Leszek Karski, V. Spy V. Spy

V. Spy v. Spy chronology
Meet Us Inside (1984)	Harry's Reasons (1986)	A.O. Mod. TV. Vers. (1986)

Singles from Harry's Reasons
- 1. "Injustice" Released: August 1985; 2. "Harry's Reasons" Released: November 1985; 3. "Something" Released: February 1986

Harry's Reasons is the debut studio album by Australian rock band Spy vs. Spy. The album was released in February 1986 on the Powderworks label and was produced by Leszek Karski.

== Track listing ==
Side A

1. "All Over the World" – 4:42
2. "Something" – 3:41
3. "Learn to Laugh" – 4:17
4. "Shirt of a Happy Man" – 4:18
5. "Out and Dreaming" – 4:03
6. "Dangerman" – 1:28

Side B

1. "Harry's Reasons?" – 4:29
2. "Way of the World" – 4:06
3. "The Wait" – 3:34
4. "Iron Curtain" – 3:53
5. "Injustice" – 3:10

== Charts ==
Chart (1986)	Peak position
Australian Albums (Kent Music Report)	42

Chart (2026)	Peak position
Australian Albums (ARIA)	7

== Release history ==
Country	Date	Label	Format	Catalogue
Australia	10 February 1986	Powderworks	LP, CD, Cassette	POW 6106
Brazil	1987	Warner Music Group	LP, CD	254695-2/ 254695-1
Brazil	2002	Tronador Music	CD	TMCL02-2
Australia	2 October 2026	SL1	LP	SPYSCDHR2026
