= Xenophobia (Why?) =

Studio album by Spy vs. Spy
- Released: March 1988
- Recorded: November/December 1987
- Studios: Rhinoceros Studios, Sydney
- Length: 44:44
- Label: Warner Music Group
- Producers: Guy Gray, Les Karski

Spy vs. Spy chronology
A.O. Mod. TV. Vers. (1986)	Xenophobia (Why?) (1988)	Trash the Planet (1989)

Singles from Xenophobia (Why?)
- 1. "Forget about the Working Week" Released: December 1987; 2. "Clarity of Mind" Released: May 1988; 3. "Waiting" Released: August 1988

Xenophobia (Why?) is the third studio album by Australian rock band Spy vs. Spy, it was produced by Les Karski (Boys Next Door, Midnight Oil, Nauts) and Guy Gray, and released through WEA in March 1988. For this album Spy vs Spy were known as v. Spy v. Spy, and the line-up was the original trio Craig Bloxom on bass guitar/lead vocals, Cliff Grigg on drums/percussion and Mike Weiley on lead guitar/vocals.

After having toured for A.O. Mod. TV. Vers., WEA demanded another album immediately, so Xenophobia (Why?) was written and recorded in just six weeks, the title was inspired by race issues surfacing in the lead-up to Australia's Bicentennial year. The album peaked at No. 15 on the Kent Music Report and was released in 14 countries.

It provided three singles, "(Forget about the) Working Week", "Clarity of Mind" and "Waiting". None of the singles peaked in the Top 40 of the Kent Music Report for the Australian singles charts.

== Reception ==
Smash Hits said, "The "why?" in the title is there so you won't think V.Spy V.Spy consider xenophobia a good idea. The rampant unsubtlety is the Spies through and through. They can't leave things alone. They have to keep ramming the point home. The production on the album is great. The cover is awful."

== Track listing ==
All songs written by Craig Bloxom, Michael Weiley, Cliff Grigg and G Vasicek (aka Gary Morris).

No.	Title	Length
1.	"Test of Time"	4:11
2.	"The Golden Mile"	3:52
3.	"Free the Future"	3:46
4.	"Waiting"	3:20
5.	"Working Week"	4:28
6.	"A.O Mod"	3:34
7.	"Clarity of Mind"	3:48
8.	"Soldiers"	3:42
9.	"Mingle 'n' Mix"	3:24
10.	"Back on the Track"	5:41
11.	"Relax"	4:58

== Charts ==
Chart (1988)	Peak position
Australia (Kent Music Report)	15

== Release history ==
Country	Date	Label	Format	Catalogue
Australia	March 1988	WEA	LP, CD, Cassette	255349-1 255349-2 255349-4
Brazil	2002	Tronador Music	CD	TMCL04-2
