= Proof (1991 film) =

- Film poster
- Directed by: Jocelyn Moorhouse
- Written by: Jocelyn Moorhouse
- Produced by: Lynda House
- Starring: Hugo Weaving; Geneviève Picot; Russell Crowe
- Cinematography: Martin McGrath
- Edited by: Ken Sallows
- Music by: Not Drowning Waving
- Distributed by: Roadshow Entertainment
- Release date: 15 August 1991
- Running time: 86 minutes
- Country: Australia
- Language: English
- Budget: $1.1 million
- Box office: $2.1 million domestic; $1 million overseas sales

Proof is a 1991 Australian romantic comedy-drama film written and directed by Jocelyn Moorhouse. The film stars Hugo Weaving, Geneviève Picot and Russell Crowe. The film was released in Australia on 15 August 1991. It was chosen as "Best Film" at the 1991 Australian Film Institute Awards, along with five other awards, including Moorhouse for Best Director, Weaving for Best Leading Actor, and Crowe for Best Supporting Actor.

== Plot ==
The story concerns the tribulations of Martin, a blind photographer. Through a series of flashbacks, Martin is shown as a child, distrustful of his own mother. She describes to him the garden outside his bedroom window. She tells him that someone is raking leaves, but he cannot hear the sound and angrily decides she is lying to him.

This childhood experience strongly affects Martin as an adult, as he anticipates that sighted people will take advantage of his blindness to lie to him, or worse yet, pity him. He has become a resentful, vaguely bitter person who spends his days taking some photographs of the world around him, then having various people describe them. He uses these photographs and the Braille descriptions before he stamps on them as "proof" that the world around him really is as others describe it to him. He also takes secret pleasure in rebuking the romantic advances of Celia, his housekeeper. Celia harbours a deep-seated and obsessive crush on Martin, as evidenced by the scores of photographs of him adorning the walls of her flat, and takes out her frustration at her unrequited love by tormenting Martin in small ways, such as rearranging the furniture in his house. Martin keeps Celia around because her love and hatred of him means he knows she cannot pity him.

One day Martin encounters Andy, and is pleased with the depth and detail with which Andy describes his photos. The two fast become close friends, and Martin soon comes to trust him implicitly. The jealous Celia is threatened by Andy's increasing presence in Martin's life. She seduces Andy, and Martin catches the two in the act, before Andy reluctantly lies to him about it. Celia recognizes this opportunity to foil Martin yet again, and sets up a series of events leading Martin to discover Andy's dishonesty. Martin is devastated and plunged into a deep despair, and breaks off his friendship with Andy. Later on, Andy confronts him, and tries to convince him that everyone has flaws, and should not be judged on such simple terms. "People lie," he tells Martin, "but not all the time. And that's the point." Martin does not respond, but is swayed by Andy's impassioned words. Near the story's conclusion, Martin decides to fire Celia, but acknowledges his own role in purposely antagonizing her in their love-hate relationship. Despite his openness she is extremely angry that her efforts have gone to waste, and when asked to return her key to Martin's house, she throws it in a sink full of water.

Finally, Martin asks Andy to describe one last photo for him, one he has kept locked away for years. Martin had previously told Andy that this was the first and most important photo he had ever taken. It is a photo of the garden from Martin's childhood, taken moments after his mother described it on that fateful day. However, Andy's detailed description includes the iconic man raking leaves Martin's mother told him about, that he had rejected for all these years. This revelation provides Martin with his proof and emotional release.

== Cast ==
- Hugo Weaving as Martin
- Geneviève Picot as Celia
- Russell Crowe as Andy
- Heather Mitchell as Martin's mother
- Jeffrey Walker as Young Martin
- Daniel Pollock as Punk
- Frankie J. Holden as Brian
- Frank Gallacher as Vet
- Saskia Post as Waitress
- Belinda Davey as Doctor
- Cliff Ellen as Cemetery Caretaker
- Tania Uren as Customer
- Robert James O'Neill as Hoon
- Anthony Rawling as Hoon
- Darko Tuscan as Hoon

== Production ==
The film took four years to go from script to finished film.

== Box office ==
Proof grossed $2.1 million at the box office in Australia and $1 million in foreign sales. It was the third highest-grossing Australian film of the year behind Green Card and Death in Brunswick.

== Reception ==
On the review aggregator website Rotten Tomatoes, 94% of 18 critics' reviews are positive.

Rob Lowing, film critic for The Sydney Morning Herald, praised the quality of the script and the acting. Lowing wrote, "Proof is an extraordinary film, another landmark in Australian movie history which proves that, yes, you can have it all: great drama with wit and wisdom, lasting impact and entertainment too."

=== Awards ===
- 1991: Won Australian Film Institute Awards: Best Achievement in Editing, Best Actor in Lead Role (Hugo Weaving), Best Actor in Supporting Role (Russell Crowe), Best Director, Best Film, and Best Screenplay
- 1991: Nominated Australian Film Institute Awards: Best Achievement in Sound, and Best Actress in Lead Role (Geneviève Picot)
- 1991: Won Tokyo International Film Festival: Bronze Award, Jocelyn Moorhouse
- 1991: Won Cannes Film Festival: Golden Camera Award, Jocelyn Moorhouse
- 1992: Won São Paulo International Film Festival: Critics Awards, Jocelyn Moorhouse
- 1992: Won British Film Institute Awards: Sutherland Trophy, Jocelyn Moorhouse

== Soundtrack ==
Proof

Soundtrack album by Not Drowning, Waving
- Released: 1991
- Studio: Pig Pen and Hothouse Studios
- Label: Rogues Gallery
- Producer: Not Drowning, Waving, Paul Kosky, Tim Cole

Not Drowning, Waving chronology
Tabaran (1990)	Proof (1991)	Circus (1993)

The soundtrack was released in 1991, credited to Not Drowning, Waving. At the ARIA Music Awards of 1992, it won the ARIA Award for Best Independent Release and was nominated for Best Original Soundtrack, Cast or Show Album.

=== Track listing ===
1. "Walk" - 3:03
2. "Sunday" - 5:36
3. "Sad" - 2:52
4. "Happy" - 3:45
5. "Fun" - 1:25
6. "Sad" - 1:14
7. "The Garden" - 3:52
8. "Panic" - 2:00
9. "Sultry" - 3:34
10. "Walk" - 3:21
11. "Sad" - 2:52

== See also ==
- Cinema of Australia
- Russell Crowe filmography
