= A.O. Mod. TV. Vers. =

Studio album by v. Spy v. Spy
- Released: December 1986
- Recorded: August/September 1986; Alberts Studios, Sydney
- Genre: rock
- Length: 43:39
- Label: WEA
- Producer: Leszek Karski

V. Spy v. Spy chronology
Harry's Reasons (1986)	A.O. Mod. TV. Vers. (1986)	Xenophobia (1988)

Singles from A.O. Mod. TV. Vers.
- 1. "Don't Tear It Down" Released: November 1986; 2. "Sallie-Anne" Released: March 1987; 3. "Credit Cards" Released: May 1987

A.O. Mod. TV. Vers. is the second studio album by Australian rock band Spy vs Spy, produced by Leszek Karski (Boys Next Door, Midnight Oil, Nauts) and released through WEA in December 1986.

The title is an abbreviation of 'Adults Only Modified Television Version' which used to appear at the bottom of late night movies in Australia at the time. The album peaked at No. 12 on the Kent Music Report and went gold. For this album Spy vs Spy recorded as v. Spy v. Spy, and the line-up was the original trio Craig Bloxom on bass guitar/lead vocals, Cliff Grigg on drums/percussion and Mike Weiley on lead guitar/vocals.

The album provided three singles – "Don't Tear it Down" inspired by the Department of Main Roads seeking to demolish the band's Darling Street squat, "Sallie-Anne" about murdered prostitute/whistleblower Sallie-Anne Huckstepp and "Credit Cards" a commentary on spiralling debt and consumerism. "Don't Tear It Down" was the band's most successful single, peaking at No. 31 on the Kent Music Report of the Australian singles charts in February 1987, it stayed in the charts for 20 weeks and went platinum.

== Background ==
Spy vs Spy had formed in 1981 in Sydney as a ska/pub rock band. Their line-up was the trio Craig Bloxom on bass guitar/lead vocals, Cliff Grigg on drums/percussion and Mike Weiley on lead guitar/vocals. They became known for tackling political issues including racism, homelessness and contemporary drug culture. By 1984 they were using the name v. Spy v. Spy to avoid legal problems with Mad magazine. They were signed to Midnight Oil's label Powderworks and managed by Oils manager, Gary Morris. Their first full-length album Harry's Reasons was released in February 1986.

Spy vs Spy switched labels to WEA in 1986 and released the single "Don't Tear it Down" in November 1986.

== Track listing ==
All tracks written by Craig Bloxom, Michael Weiley, Cliff Grigg and G Vasicek (aka Gary Morris).

No.	Title	Length
1.	"Don't Tear it Down"	4:05
2.	"Credit Cards"	4:40
3.	"Mission Man"	4:07
4.	"Pockets of Pride"	4:00
5.	"Go to Work"	5:12
6.	"Sallie-Anne"	5:08
7.	"Snowblind"	4:04
8.	"Use Your Head"	4:27
9.	"Peace and Quiet"	3:11
10.	"Take Me Away"	4:45

== Personnel ==
v. Spy v. Spy members

- Craig Bloxom – bass guitar, vocals
- Cliff Grigg – drums, percussion
- Michael Weiley – lead guitar

Recording details

- Producer – Leszek Karski
- Engineer – David Hemming
- Mixer – Hemming, Karski
- Studio – Alberts Studio, Sydney

== Charts ==
Chart (1986/87)	Peak position
Australian Albums (Kent Music Report)	12

Chart (2026)	Peak position
Australian Albums (ARIA)	8

== Release history ==
Country	Date	Label	Format	Catalogue
Australia	December 1986	Warner Music Group	LP, Cassette	254458-1/ 254458-4
Japan	December 1986	WEA	LP	P-13583
Australia	1987	Warner Music Group	CD	254458-2
Australia	2 October 2026	SL1	LP	SPYSCDAOM2026
