= David Bridie =

Australian musician

- Born: David Ross Hope Bridie; 1962 (age 63–64); Melbourne, Victoria, Australia
- Genres: World; rock; ambient; alternative; art rock
- Occupations: Musician; music producer
- Instruments: Piano; vocals; keyboards
- Years active: 1980–present
- Label: EMI

David Ross Hope Bridie (born 1962) is an Australian contemporary musician and songwriter. He was a founding mainstay member of world music band Not Drowning, Waving which released six studio albums to critical acclaim. He also formed a chamber pop group, My Friend the Chocolate Cake, which released seven studio albums. During his solo career he has issued five studio albums and worked on soundtracks for Australian films and television like The Man Who Sued God, Remote Area Nurse, Secret City, and The Circuit. Bridie is the founder and artistic director of Wantok Musik Foundation; a not-for-profit music label that records, releases and promotes culturally infused music from indigenous Australia, Melanesia and Oceania. In 2019 he received the Don Banks Music Award. David was awarded an Honorary Doctorate from Deakin University in 2024, and awarded the Medal of Merit, Timor Leste in 2026.

== Life and career ==
Bridie grew up in the Melbourne suburb of Deepdene with three siblings. He attended Camberwell High School and the University of Melbourne, and received training in classical music. From 1980 to 1983 Bridie provided keyboards for Misspent Youth, with James Southall on percussion. They travelled to Perth, after their lead singer convinced them they would earn more money. Bridie had dropped out of his Arts/Law degree course for the venture, but found that Perth bands performed cover versions due to "the city's penchant for Top 40 and retro hits." They returned to Melbourne and he left the group soon after. He was also a member of Go Circus, alongside Rowan McKinnon on bass guitar.

Bridie on vocals, piano, synthesiser and percussion formed a World music duo, Not Drowning, Waving in Melbourne in 1983 with fellow classical musician John Phillips on guitar. The pair had met at La Trobe University when Bridie invited Phillips to help record a track, "Moving Around", which had McKinnon providing bass guitar. Initially Not Drowning, Waving was a studio-only project while Bridie, McKinnon, Phillips and Southall formed a performance group, Easter, with Russel Bradley on drums and Tim Cole on lead vocals. "Moving Around" was issued as Not Drowning, Waving's debut single in April 1984. The duo followed with their debut album, Another Pond, in January 1985 via Rampant Records. It was produced by their Easter bandmate, Cole.

Easter were performing shows around Melbourne and released their own single, "Cheesecloth", in August 1985. Some of its members joined Not Drowning, Waving and the two groups co-existed with almost the same line-up. Not Drowning, Waving started live shows, while Easter wound down and eventually disbanded. Bridie and Phillips also worked in screen music beginning with the soundtrack for a film documentary, Canoe Man, directed by Mark Worth. To research music for the documentary, Bridie had travelled to Rabaul, Papua New Guinea (PNG) in 1986 and first heard George Telek's "amazing song coming out of a recording studio." He returned, with Not Drowning, Waving, to Rabaul in late 1988 to record their fifth album, Tabaran (1990). Aside from Telek they used other local musicians, and the album was co-credited to The Musicians of Rabaul, Papua New Guinea featuring Telek. They toured PNG together, including a concert at the nation's capital, Port Moresby, to an audience of 25000; and then they toured Australia.

In late 1989 Helen Mountfort joined Not Drowning, Waving after having provided cello on a track on Tabaran. Bridie, with bandmates Bradley and Mountfort formed an acoustic strings-based side project, My Friend the Chocolate Cake, as a chamber pop group. Other founders were Andrew Caswell on mandolin, Hope Csutoros on violin and Andrew Richardson on guitar. They released a self-titled album in 1991 with Bridie co-producing alongside Mountfort, Carswell and Cole. Also in that year Not Drowning, Waving provided the soundtrack for comedy-drama film, Proof. Bridie and Mountfort worked with Jen Anderson on violin (ex-the Black Sorrows) and members of Hunters & Collectors' horn section on a feature film, Hammers Over the Anvil (1993), which was issued in the following year as a soundtrack album, Hammers, credited to Not Drowning, Waving. The group released their sixth and last studio album, Circus, in 1993 and disbanded by the end of the year.

AllMusic's Australian-based music journalist, Ed Nimmervoll, observed that Bridie and Phillips' early work, "sparked the duo's enthusiasm for the sort of free-form ambient soundscapes that would become the basis of their sound as the group Not Drowning Waving and lay the seeds for their interest in film music." Fellow Australian music historian, Ian McFarlane, noticed the influences of Brian Eno and David Byrne on the pair, but "[they] were not averse to incorporating African and other Third World rhythms into their muse. Likewise, they placed an emphasis on natural acoustic and atmospheric dynamics rather than an electronic approach."

My Friend the Chocolate Cake, with Bridie and Mountfort as mainstays, issued seven studio albums before the group took an indefinite hiatus from August 2018. Periodically Not Drowning, Waving have reformed in 1996, 2001, 2003 and 2005 to 2006 and released a live album. Bridie and Phillips have issued two duo albums, Projects 1983–1993 (1994) and Projects 2 (2011). After My Friend the Chocolate Cake's debut album Bridie's further work as a record producer in the mid-1990s includes Archie Roach's Jamu Dreaming (1993), Paul Kelly's Wanted Man (1994) and Christine Anu's Stylin' Up (1995). He joined Anu's touring band in support of her album's release throughout 1995. At the ARIA Music Awards of 1995 he was nominated for Producer of the Year.

During 1998 he recorded a soundtrack album, In a Savage Land (November 1999), for a feature film of the same name, which was set and partly filmed on PNG's Trobriand Islands. He had collaborated with Musicians from the Trobriand Islands. His score received widespread critical acclaim, Andrew L. Urban of Urban Cinefile praised the film's "unity of vision", in using "a wide palette of extraordinary music and sound." His work achieved multiple awards, Best Original Score at the 1999 AFI Awards, Best Music Score from the Film Critics Circle of Australia, and Best Original Soundtrack Album at the 2000 ARIA Awards. Upon reflection Bridie explained to Paris Pompor of FilmInk in 2017 why it was one of his favourite projects, "[it] allowed me to soak in the Trobriand Islands' culture and stay in a beach shack for eight weeks recording anything that moved and learning about a fascinating part of the world. It was dark, cultural and layered and challenging and I had free rein."

His first solo studio album, Act of Free Choice, appeared in May 2000, and "was greeted with critical praise." The album's title refers to the Indonesian Act of Free Choice (1969), which was supported by a plebiscite on the incorporation of Western New Guinea into Indonesia. Bridie's Act of Free Choice reached the top 40 on the ARIA Albums Chart. Evan Cater of AllMusic rated it at three-out-of-five stars and explained, "[he] finds new layers in his well-established gift for moody atmospherics" although "his breathy tenor can be slightly grating", while "his real strength lies in a compositional adventurousness." PopMatters' Imran Khan determined, "[he] created a new world of sound to explore, one that would define him as an artist as well as create a sonic visual that would allow the listener to enter that world and immerse himself in the emotional experience created from the album's imagined realities." In 2019 he received the Don Banks Music Award.

== Personal life ==
Bridie is the father of two daughters – one of whom, Stella, is a singer-songwriter. He is divorced. Bridie formerly resided in the inner north suburbs of Melbourne, living in Northcote until 2009 and Thornbury until 2020. That year, he moved to an off-grid property close to the Otway National Park on Victoria's Shipwreck Coast. Bridie was diagnosed with ADHD as a 10-year-old and has since had an adult diagnosis of Autism.

Bridie is a frequent traveller. His first trip overseas was to Papua New Guinea in 1986, encouraged to do so by filmmaker Mark Worth. He still makes extended trips to Rabaul, where his friendship with musician George Telek began and where his band recorded an album. He speaks Tok Pisin, and had gone through Tubuan initiation rites at the invitation of the community. This was documented in the 2023 film Abebe-Butterfly Song, directed by Rosie Jones, which included extensive archival footage of Bridie and Telek.

== Discography ==
=== Studio albums ===
List of studio albums, with release date, label, selected chart positions and certifications shown
Title	Details	Peak chart positions
Title	Details	AUS
Projects 1983–1993 (with John Phillips)	Released: 1994; Label: White Records/Mushroom Records (D31140); Format: CD	−
Act of Free Choice	Released: May 2000; Label: EMI Music (52671625); Format: CD, digital	37
Music to Tempted	Released: 2002; Label: The Blunt Label/Mushroom Records; Format: CD, digital	−
Hotel Radio	Released: April 2003; Label: Capitol Records (5804002); Format: CD, digital	97
Succumb	Released: 2008; Label: Bridie (LMCD0014); Format: 2xCD, digital	−
Projects 2 (with John Phillips)	Released: 2011; Label: Bridie; Format: digital	−
Wake	Released: 2013; Label: Bridie (DB004-CD); Format: CD, LP, digital	−
The Wisdom Line	Released: 2019; Label: David Bridie; Format: CD, LP, digital	−
Reconstructions (with All India Radio)	Released: October 2020; Label: Spectra; Formats: digital	−
It's been a while since our last correspondence	Released: March 2023; Label: David Bridie; Formats: digital and vinyl	−

On Karens Piano.  Released May 2025.

=== Compilation albums ===
Title	Album details
Nautical Forlorn: A Selection for Film, Television, Festivals and CD	Released: 2003; Label: The Blunt Label, Shock (20035); Format: CD, DD
Take the Next Illusionary Exit	Released: 2013; Label: Bridie (DB005-CD); Format: CD, DD

=== Soundtracks ===
Over the years, David Bridie has balanced his career as a live musician with the composition of soundtrack music, with credits for over 100 feature films including Proof, Bran Nue Dae, The Man Who Sued God and Gone, several of which received International release. He also received the ARIA Award for "Best Original Soundtrack, Cast or Show Album" for Nautical Forlorn in 2004.

David Bridie has also contributed to many television shows, short films and documentaries soundtracks most notably for Remote Area Nurse for which he won an AFI Award as well as The Straits, Dealine Gallipoli and Secret City.

The song "Pitjantjara" written and performed with Frank Yamma for The Alice was awarded an APRA Screen Music Award for "Best Original Song" composed for a 'Feature Film, Telemovie, TV Series or Mini-Series'.

== Awards and nominations ==
Year	Nominee / work	Award	Result	Ref.
1995	himself	ARIA Award for Producer of the Year	Nominated	
1996	That Eye, the Sky (with John Phillips)	APRA Screen Music Award for Best Film Score	Nominated	
1996	"Fool for You" by Monique Brumby	ARIA Award for Producer of the Year	Nominated	
1997	"Mary" by Monique Brumby	ARIA Award for Producer of the Year	Nominated	
1999	In a Savage Land	AFI Award for Best Original Score	Won	
1999	In a Savage Land	Film Critics Circle of Australia Award for Best Music Score	Won	
2000	In a Savage Land	ARIA Award for Best Original Soundtrack Album	Won	
2000	Act of Free Choice	ARIA Award for Album of the Year	Nominated	
2000	Act of Free Choice	ARIA Award for Best Male Artist	Nominated	
2000	Act of Free Choice	ARIA Award for Best Alternative Release	Nominated	
2003	Hotel Radio	ARIA Award for Best Adult Contemporary Album	Nominated	
2003	West Papua: Sound of the Morning Star	ARIA Award for Best World Music Album	Nominated	
2004	Nautical Forlorn	ARIA Award for Best Original Soundtrack, Cast or Show Album	Won	
2004	Land of the Morning Star	AACTA Awards for Best Sound in a Non-Feature Film	Won	
2005	The Alice: "Pitjantjara" (with Frank Yamma)	APRA Screen Music Award for Best Original Song composed for a Feature Film, Telemovie, TV Series or Mini-Series	Won	
2005	The Alice	APRA Screen Music Award for Best Music for a Mini-Series or Telemovie	Nominated	
2006	Remote Area Nurse (with Albert David, Kadu, Key Torres Strait Island Composers)	APRA Screen Music Award for Best Soundtrack Album	Won	
2006	Remote Area Nurse	ARIA Award for Best Original Soundtrack, Cast or Show Album	Nominated	
2007	The Circuit	ARIA Award for Best Original Soundtrack, Cast or Show Album	Nominated	
2007	Gone	ARIA Award for Best Original Soundtrack, Cast or Show Album	Nominated	
2009	Two Fists, One Heart	APRA Screen Music Award for Best Feature Film Score	Nominated	
2011	Strange Birds in Paradise: A West Papuan Soundtrack	ARIA Award for Best World Music Album	Nominated	
2012	The Straits	APRA Screen Music Award for Best Soundtrack Album	Nominated	
2013	Satellite Boy	ARIA Award for Best Original Soundtrack, Cast or Show Album	Nominated	
2013	David Bridie	Music Victoria Awards Best Male	Nominated	
2016	Putuparri and the Rainmakers	APRA Screen Music Award for Best Music for a Documentary	Nominated	
2016	Secret City	APRA Screen Music Award for Best Music for a Mini-Series or Telemovie	Nominated	
2017	Music project: a Bit na Ta	APRA Art Music Award for Excellence by an Individual	Nominated	
2017	A Bit na Ta (with George Telek & Musicians of the Gunantuna)	Music Victoria Awards Best Global or Reggae Album	Nominated	
2019	Australia's Lost Impressionist	APRA Screen Music Award for Best Music for a Documentary	Won	
2019	Secret City: Under the Eagle: "Run Little Rabbit"	APRA Screen Music Award for Best Music for a Television Series or Serial	Nominated	
2019	The Merger	APRA Screen Music Award for Best Soundtrack Album	Nominated	
2019	himself	Don Banks Music Award	awarded	
2020	The Skin of Others: "Ballad of the Bridge-Builders" (with Tom Murray)	APRA Screen Music Award for Best Original Song Composed for the Screen	Won	
2025	himself	AIR Awards for Outstanding Achievement Award	awarded	
2026	Journey Home, David Gulpilil	AACTA Awards Best Original Score in a Documentary	Won	

- Australian Antarctic Territory Fellowship, 2023.
