= Chris Duncan (musician) =

Australian Scottish Fiddle player

- Genres: Folk Music

Chris Duncan, is an Australian Scottish Fiddle player. He was described by The Age's Anna King Murdoch as being one of the "two really great Scottish fiddle players in the world." His album Fyvies Embrace - The Golden Age of the Scottish Fiddle won the 2000 ARIA Award for Best World Music Album.

== Discography ==
=== Albums ===
List of albums
Title	Album details
Fyvies Embrace - The Golden Age of the Scottish Fiddle	Released: September 1999; Label: ABC Classics (465 2632); Formats: CD
The Red House - The Heritage of Scottish Fiddle (with Catherine Strutt and Julian Thompson)	Released: November 2006; Label: ABC Classics (465 2632); Formats: CD
Carriages at Midnight (with Catherine Strutt)	Released: March 2015; Label: Chris Duncan; Formats: CD, digital

== Awards and nominations ==
=== ARIA Music Awards ===
The ARIA Music Awards is an annual awards ceremony that recognises excellence, innovation, and achievement across all genres of Australian music. They commenced in 1987.

Year	Nominee / work	Award	Result	Ref.
2000	Fyvies Embrace - The Golden Age of the Scottish Fiddle	Best World Music Album	Won	
