= Fyvie's Embrace =

Studio album by Chris Duncan
- Released: September 1999
- Label: ANC Music

Chris Duncan chronology
Fyvie's Embrace (1999)	The Red House - The Heritage Of Scottish Fiddle (2006)

Fyvie's Embrace (subtitled The Golden Age of the Scottish Fiddle) is the debut studio album by Australian musician, Chris Duncan. The album was released in September 1999.

At the ARIA Music Awards of 2000, the album won the ARIA Award for Best World Music Album.

== Track listing ==
1. "The Bonnie Lass o' Bon-Accord Set"
2. "The Cradle Song"
3. "The Haggis Set"
4. "Lady Charlotte Campbell Set"
5. "Fyvie Castle"
6. "Miss McPherson Set"
7. "Nathaniel Gow's Lament On the Death of His Brother"
8. "The Highlandman Set"
9. "Bovaglie's Plaid"
10. "The Marquis of Huntly's Farewell Set"
11. "Niel Gow's Lament for the Death of His Second Wife"
12. "The Merry Making Set"
13. "Angus Campbell Set"
14. "The Fairy Dance Set"
15. "The Cottage Adjoining the Falls"
16. "The Piper's Weird"
17. "Craigellachie Brig Set"
18. "Giullan nam bo 'The Cow Boy'"
