= John Butler Trio discography =

- Studio albums: 7
- Extended plays: 2
- Live albums: 5
- Singles: 14
- Video albums: 3

The John Butler Trio are an Australian roots jam band. To date, they have released seven studio albums, five live albums, eleven singles, two EPs, and three video albums.

The John Butler Trio's second studio album, Three (2001), reached the top 30 on the Australian album charts and achieved platinum sales status. The band's subsequent studio albums titled Sunrise Over Sea (2004), Grand National (2007), and April Uprising (2010) all debuted at #1 on the Australian album charts with all three reaching platinum sales status.

The band's first live album titled Living 2001–2002 (2003) reached the top 10 and achieved platinum status in Australia. The band's second live album, Live at St. Gallen (2005), was successful as well achieving gold record status in Australia.

== Studio albums ==
Year	Album details	Peak chart positions								Certifications (sales thresholds)
Year	Album details	AUS	US	US Heat.	NZ	FRA	SWI	BEL (Fl)	BEL (Wa)	Certifications (sales thresholds)
1998	John Butler: Released: 27 December 1998; Label: Independent/MGM Distribution (JBT001); Format: LP	—	—	—	—	—	—	—	—	ARIA: Gold
2001	Three: Released: 18 April 2001; Label: Independent/MGM Distribution (JBT003); Format: CD	24	—	—	—	—	—	—	—	ARIA: Platinum
2004	Sunrise Over Sea: Released: 8 March 2004 (Note: Sunrise Over Sea debuted at #1 on the ARIA Top 50 Charts on 15 March 2004, reaching gold record status in its first week on sale. It was the first time a release by a completely independent Australian artist on their own independent label had debuted at the top of the national charts. It peaked at #1 for three weeks and spent a total of 57 weeks in the charts. Sunrise Over Sea also debuted at #1 on the AIR Album Charts and spent a total of 84 weeks in those charts.); Label: Jarrah Records (JBT006); Format: CD	1	—	16	9	36	—	—	—	ARIA: 5× Platinum
2007	Grand National: Released: 24 March 2007; Label: Jarrah Records (JBT011); Format: CD	1	110	1	14	17	58	—	94	ARIA: 3× Platinum
2010	April Uprising: Release: 26 March 2010; Label: Jarrah Records (JBT015); Format: CD	1	36	2	6	4	9	33	61	ARIA: Platinum
2014	Flesh & Blood: Released: 7 February 2014; Label: Jarrah Records; Format: CD	2	58	1	2	1	1	8	24	ARIA: Gold
2018	Home: Released: 28 September 2018; Label: Jarrah Records; Format: CD	1	—	—	—	—	61	—	87	
"—" denotes releases that did not chart or receive certification.

== Live albums ==
Year	Album details	Peak chart positions		Certifications (sales thresholds)
Year	Album details	AUS	FRA	Certifications (sales thresholds)
2002	Living 2001–2002: Released: 10 February 2003; Label: Jarrah (JBT004); Format: CD	6	—	ARIA: Platinum
2005	Live at St. Gallen: Released: 5 December 2005; Label: Jarrah (SFL1-0142); Format: LP	47	76	ARIA: Gold
2009	Live at Lollapalooza: Released: 22 September 2009; Label: Jarrah; Format: Digital	—	—	
2011	Live at Red Rocks: Released: 19 July 2011; Label: Jarrah; Format: CD	22	—	
2023	Live in Paris: Released: 21 April 2023; Label: Family Music; Format: Digital download, streaming	—	—	

== EPs ==
Year	EP details
2000	JBT EP: Released: 31 July 2000; Label: Independent/MGM Distribution (JBT002); Format: CD
2004	What You Want: Released: 9 August 2004; Label: Jarrah (JBT007); Format: CD

== Cassette ==
Year	Album details	Sales
1996	Searching for Heritage (Note: Searching for Heritage was recorded and released by John Butler prior to the formation of the John Butler Trio): Released: 1996; Label: Independent (self release); Format: cassette	3,500

== Singles ==
Year	Title	Peak chart positions		Certifications (sales thresholds)	Album
Year	Title	AUS	NZ	Certifications (sales thresholds)	Album
2001	"Betterman"	—	—	ARIA: Platinum	Three
2003	"Zebra"	22	27	ARIA: 2× Platinum	Sunrise Over Sea
2004	"What You Want"	29	—		Sunrise Over Sea
2004	"Somethings Gotta Give"	47	—		Sunrise Over Sea
2006	"Funky Tonight"^{[A]}	15	—		non-album single
2007	"Good Excuse"^{[B]}	—	—	ARIA: Gold	Grand National
2007	"Better Than"	16	32	ARIA: 3× Platinum	Grand National
2007	"Funky Tonight" (with Keith Urban)^{[C]}	11	—		non-album single
2007	"Used to Get High"^{[D]}	—	—	ARIA: Gold	Grand National
2009	"One Way Road"	15	—		April Uprising
2010	"Close to You"	38	—	ARIA: Platinum	April Uprising
2010	"Revolution"	34	—	ARIA: Platinum	April Uprising
2011	"I'd Do Anything"	69	—		April Uprising
2013	"Only One"	44	—		Flesh & Blood
2018	"Home"	—	—		Home
2018	"Just Call Me"	—	—		Home
2018	"Tell Me Why"	—	—		Home
"—" denotes a recording that did not chart or was not released in that territory.

== DVDs ==
Year	Album details	Certifications (sales thresholds)
2005	Live at St. Gallen: Released: 5 December 2005; Label: Jarrah Records; Format: DVD	—
2007	Live at Federation Square: Released: 3 November 2007; Label: ABC Music/Warner Music Australia; Format: DVD	ARIA: Platinum
2011	Live at Red Rocks: Released: 19 July 2011; Label: Jarrah Records; Format: DVD	—

== Notes ==
A."Funky Tonight" was originally released as a non-album single, it subsequently appeared on the album, Grand National.
B."Good Excuse" was released as a radio promotional single only.
C."Funky Tonight" was performed by John Butler Trio and Keith Urban at 2007 ARIA Awards and the duet was released as a digital download single only.
D."Used to Get High" was released as a radio promotional single only.
