= One Small Step (album) =

Live album by John Butler
- Released: 2007
- Recorded: 29 June 2007
- Studio: Twist & Shout Records - Denver, Colorado
- Genre: Acoustic
- Length: 41:17
- Label: Jarrah
- Producer: John Butler

John Butler chronology
Searching for Heritage (1996)	One Small Step (2007)	Tin Shed Tales (2012)

One Small Step (subtitled Live and Solo), is a live album by John Butler. It features 8 tracks from three previous John Butler Trio albums, recorded live at Twist & Shout Records in Colorado, United States. The album was also released under the title Live At Twist & Shout.

The albums inner gatefold also featured an advertisement for OxfamAUS's "Close The Gap" campaign, which aims at narrowing the difference between the average life span of indigenous and non-indigenous Australians (currently 17 years). $1 AUD from every sale of the record was donated to Close The Gap.

== Track listing ==
1. "Used To Get High" (from Grand National) - 4:18
2. "Treat Yo Mama" (from Sunrise Over Sea) - 5:41
3. "Daniella" (from Grand National) - 3:22
4. "Ocean" (from John Butler) - 9:53
5. "Better Than" (from Grand National) - 4:20
6. "Zebra" (from Sunrise Over Sea) - 3:53
7. "Fire In The Sky" (from Grand National) - 3:47
8. "Funky Tonight" (from Grand National) - 6:04

== Personnel ==
- John Butler - Vocals, acoustic/amplified 11 string guitar, banjo, Weissenborn lapsteel, Harmonica
- Artwork & Design by Tom Walker
- Cover Photography by James Minchin
- Live Photography by Chris Newman, Adam Whitehouse, Brad Woodard
- Recorded by Ian Hlatky
- Mixed by Jeff Juliano
- Mastered by Brian "Big Bass" Gardner

== Charts ==
=== Weekly chart ===
Chart (2008)	Peak position
Australia (ARIA)	23
