= Byron Luiters =

Australian-born musician

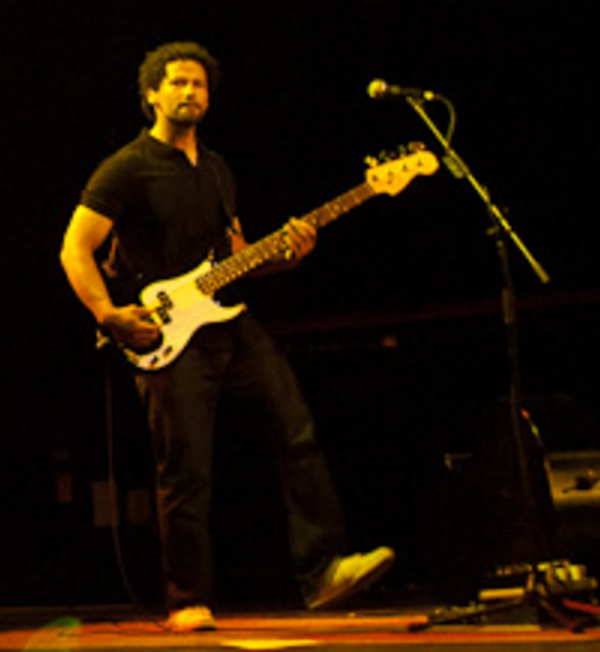
- Luiters performing with the John Butler Trio in Toronto c. 2012

Background information
- Also known as: Message from the Sun.......
- Born: Australia
- Genres: Roots, funk
- Occupations: Musician, composer
- Instruments: Double bass, electric bass, piano, didgeridoo
- Label: Jarrah Records

Byron Luiters is an Australian-born musician, best known as the bass guitarist for John Butler Trio and a Message from the Sun......

== Early career ==
Luiters first played on a didgeridoo at age sixteen before learning how to play the bass about a year later, inspired by Stuart Zender's bass playing on Jamiroquai's 1994 album The Return of the Space Cowboy.

Luiters was initially in a neo-soul band called Ray Mann Three. He joined the band in May 2007, replacing the band's original bassist, Matt Hunter. At that time the band comprised Luiters, along with Ray Wassef on lead vocals and guitar and Bart Denaro on drums. The Ray Mann Three released a self-titled debut album in April 2008. Luiters performed extensively with the band, from their first national headline tour in 2008 to performances on the band's national tour support for Al Green in 2010.

== John Butler Trio ==
In June 2009 Luiters was announced as the bassist for The John Butler Trio, replacing previous bassist Shannon Birchall, although he didn't officially leave The Ray Mann Three until August 2010.

The new line-up of The John Butler Trio, according to Billboard recorded twenty two songs at Butler's home based studio in Fremantle in late 2009 to early 2010, this was eventually cut down to the fifteen that appear on the album, April Uprising. The album was released on 26 March 2010 debuting at No. 1 on the Australian ARIA albums chart on 5 April and the first two singles from the album, "One Way Road" and "Close to You", charting at No. 15 and No. 36 on the Australian ARIA singles charts.

On 4 June 2010 John Butler Trio played a show at Red Rocks Amphitheatre, which was streamed live to fans around the world at Livestream. This performance was also recorded and released on CD and DVD in July 2011.

In 2013 Luiters appeared on second series of the Australian reality talent show, The Voice, as part of the house band, backing the various contestants. He also performs in a Sydney-based six-piece R&B Soul band, Brown Sugar.

== Discography ==
=== with Ray Mann Three ===
- Ray Mann Three (April 2008)
- "Smile" (27 January 2009)
- "Hook Me Up" (13 April 2009)
- "Opa Opa" (19 June 2009)

=== with John Butler Trio ===
- "One Way Road" – Jarrah (4 December 2009) (AUS #15)
- "Close to You" – Jarrah (11 March 2010) (AUS #36)
- April Uprising – Jarrah (26 March 2010) (AUS #1)
- "Revolution" – Jarrah (2 June 2010)
- "Don't Wanna See Your Face" – Jarrah (5 October 2010)
- Live at Red Rocks – Jarrah (19 July 2011)
- Flesh & Blood - Jarrah (2013)
- Home - Jarrah (2018)
