= Live at Red Rocks (The John Butler Trio album) =

Live album by The John Butler Trio
- Released: 19 July 2011
- Recorded: 4 June 2010; Red Rocks Amphitheatre
- Length: 126 minutes
- Label: Jarrah
- Producer: John Butler

The John Butler Trio chronology
April Uprising (2010)	Live at Red Rocks (2011)	Flesh & Blood (2014)

Live at Red Rocks is the fourth live album of The John Butler Trio. It was recorded on 4 June 2010 at Red Rocks Amphitheatre, and was streamed live to fans around the world at Livestream. The album was released in July 2011.

== Track listing ==
Disc 1

1. "Introduction" – 0:57
2. "Used to Get High" – 4:27
3. "I'd Do Anything" – 3:46
4. "Betterman" – 8:31
5. "Don't Wanna See Your Face" – 3:37
6. "Revolution" – 6:47
7. "Hoe Down" – 0:55
8. "Better Than" – 3:18
9. "Johnny's Gone" – 3:43
10. "Take Me" – 4:51
11. "Treat Yo Mama" – 10:40
12. "Losing You" (featuring Mama Kin) – 5:25
13. "Intro to Ocean" – 1:29
14. "Ocean" – 12:02

Disc 2

1. "Ragged Mile" – 3:59
2. "Zebra" – 7:07
3. "Good Excuse" – 17:00
4. "C'mon Now" – 2:39
5. "Close to You" – 6:06
6. "Peaches and Cream" – 7:04
7. "One Way Road" – 5:24
8. "Funky Tonight" – 11:51

== Personnel ==
- John Butler – vocals, acoustic guitar, electric guitar, 12 string guitar, lap steel guitar, banjo
- Byron Luiters – electric bass, double bass, didgeridoo, vocals
- Nicky Bomba – drums, percussion, steel drums, vocals

== Various ==
- Byron Luiters broke a string of his electric bass in the middle of his solo. Nicky Bomba has had to play while the bass has been replaced.
- Nicky Bomba broke a rind of his tom just in the middle of his solo.
- The amphitheatre is built on an Indian sacred site.
- The show was preceded by an exhibition of Indians (Native Americans) invited by the trio.
- Butler's wife made an appearance to sing with John.
