= The Truth (Australian band) =

Australian funk band

- Also known as: Truth
- Origin: Melbourne, Victoria, Australia
- Genres: Funk
- Years active: 1991–1997
- Past members: Nicky Bomba; Michael Caruana; Tony Kopa; Geoff Wells; Mick Girasole

The Truth were an Australian funk band, active from 1991 to 1997. The lineup included Nicky Bomba (a.k.a. Nicholas Caruana) on drums, his older brother Michael Caruana on keyboards, Mick Girasole on bass guitar, Tony Kopa on vocals and Geoff Wells on guitars. They released two albums, The Truth (1994), which peaked in the top 60 on the ARIA Albums Chart, and Headspace (1997).

== History ==
=== 1991–1993: Career beginnings ===
The Truth were formed in Melbourne in 1991 by Nicky Bomba (a.k.a. Nicholas Caruana) on drums, his older brother, Michael Caruana on keyboards, Tony Kopa on vocals and Geoff Wells on guitars. For about a year they held a residency at the 120 Bar, Fitzroy. In December 1992 they recorded their debut single, "Secrets".

The band gained popularity, by performing around Melbourne, and from their tracks, "My Heavy Friend" and "Secrets", receiving airplay on national youth radio station, Triple J. A live-in-the-studio version of "My Heavy Friend" was included on Triple J's compilation album by various artists, Live at the Wireless 3 (1993). As a consequence, "My Heavy Friend", was issued as their second single in 1993.

=== 1994–1997: The Truth, Headspace and break up ===
Their self-titled first studio album, The Truth was released via Mushroom Records in July 1994. It was produced by Jim Hilbun (The Angels' bass guitarist). It peaked in the top 60 on the ARIA Albums Chart. For touring the band had no traditional bass player: bass lines were provided by Michael "Funkmeister" Caruana on keyboards.

Wells told Nicole Leedham of The Canberra Times, in November 1994, "It's very rare to have overnight success and it's even rarer for someone who has it to stay around a while. If it was overnight success it was a bloody long night."

At the ARIA Music Awards of 1995, "My Heavy Friend" was nominated for ARIA Award for Best New Talent.

For the band's second album, Headspace was released in 1997., Mick Girasole was added on bass guitar. The band broke up toward the end of that year.

=== 1998–present: After The Truth ===
Nicky Bomba formed the band, Bomba, in 1999 for whom Caruana played keyboards. Bomba also joined the John Butler Trio from 2003 – led by John Butler who was married to Bomba's and Caruana's youngest sister, Danielle Caruana (who performs as Mama Kin).

Wells was a session musician for Daryl Braithwaite, Tina Arena and John Farnham. Farnham recorded one of Wells' tracks, "The Way" on his album 33⅓ (2000). "The Way" was track four on The Truth.

Kopa became a backing musician for Jon Stevens' solo shows and also appeared on the artist's album, The Works (2005). He also appears on a semi-regular basis with Black Dogs.

The Truth returned to the stage in 2003 for a one-off gig at The Espy in St Kilda.

== Discography ==
=== Studio albums ===
List of studio albums, with selected details and chart positions
Title	Details	Peak chart positions
Title	Details	AUS
The Truth	Released: July 1994; Label: Mushroom (D24219); Format: CD, cassette	57
Headspace	Released: 1997; Label: Mushroom (MUSH33018.2); Format: CD	—

=== Singles ===
List of singles, with selected chart positions
Title	Year	Peak chart positions	Album
Title	Year	AUS	Album
"Secrets"	1993	—	The Truth
"My Heavy Friend"	1993	—	The Truth
"Can't Help It"	1994	87	The Truth
"Let's Stay Together"	1995	—	The Truth
"Spirit of Man"	1995	—	The Truth
"Shine"	1997	—	Headspace

== Awards and nominations ==
=== ARIA Music Awards ===
The ARIA Music Awards is an annual awards ceremony that recognises excellence, innovation, and achievement across all genres of Australian music.

Year	Nominee / work	Award	Result
1995	"My Heavy Friend"	Best New Talent	Nominated
