= What You Want (EP) =

EP by John Butler Trio
- Released: 9 August 2004
- Recorded: Woodstock Studios - Melbourne, Victoria
- Genre: Roots, alternative, rock
- Length: 31:36 (Worldwide); 15:42 (AUS)
- Label: Jarrah; Lava Records (Worldwide)
- Producer: Tracks 1–3: John Butler; Track 4: Martin Armiger

John Butler Trio chronology
| Zebra (2003) | What You Want (2004) | Something's Gotta Give (2004) |

Professional ratings
Review scores
| Source | Rating |
|---|---|
| AllMusic | 4/5 stars |

What You Want (originally titled "Far Away") is the second commercially available single/EP by Australian jam band the John Butler Trio from the album Sunrise Over Sea. It was released on 9 August 2004 and is a curious blend of roots and alternative rock.

"What You Want" was ranked #51 on Triple J's Hottest 100 of 2004.

The title track was originally released on the 2003 album Sunrise Over Sea, as was the original version of "Treat Yo Mama"; while "Pickapart" was included on the JBT EP. It is also featured in the movie 'In Her Skin' directed and written by Simone North and released in 2009.

The release includes a version of "Betterman" which is a previously unreleased re-recorded version with John Butler's current band, "Treat Yo Mama" is also a previously unreleased country funk version that was recorded during the '"Betterman" (US Version)' sessions. "Across the Universe" is the John Butler Trio's take on the Beatles Classic.

The Australian release of the CD single included the video clip of "Treat Yo Mama".

== Track listing ==
All tracks written by John Butler unless otherwise noted.

Worldwide release:

1. "What You Want" - 5:20
2. "Somethings Gotta Give" - 3:07
3. "Treat Yo Mama (Country Funk version)" - 4:43
4. "Pickapart" - 3:01
5. "Across the Universe" - 3:51 (written by Lennon/McCartney)
6. "Betterman (live)" - 12:14

Australian release:

1. "What You Want (Radio Edit)" - 4:21
2. "Betterman (US Radio version)" - 3:43
3. "Treat Yo Mama (Country Funk version)" - 4:41
4. "Across the Universe" - 3:47 (written by Lennon/McCartney)

== Personnel ==
=== John Butler Trio ===
- John Butler - Amplified acoustic 11-string guitar, acoustic lapsteel, dobro lapsteel, acoustic 6-string guitar, vocals
- Shannon Birchall - Double bass, backing vocals
- Michael Barker - drums, percussion, country funk kit - "Somethings Gotta Give" & "Treat Yo Mama"
- Nicky Bomba - drums, tambourine - "What You Want" & "Pickapart"

=== Additional musicians ===
- Danielle Caruana - backing vocals - "What You Want"

String section on "What You Want"

- Shannon Birchall
- Ceridwen Davies
- Fiona Furphy
- Helen Ireland
- Amanda Rowarth
- Jane Mason
- Stephanie Lindner
- Andrea Keeble
- Caerwen Martin
- Airlie Smart
