= Live at St. Gallen =

Live album by The John Butler Trio
- Released: 5 December 2005
- Recorded: St Gallen Festival, Switzerland (3 July 2005)
- Genre: Roots
- Length: 94:40
- Label: Jarrah
- Producer: John Butler

The John Butler Trio chronology
Sunrise Over Sea (2004)	Live at St. Gallen (2005)	Grand National (2007)

Alternative Cover
- Australian release of Live at St. Gallen

Live at St. Gallen is a 2005 live CD and DVD by The John Butler Trio recorded in St. Gallen, Switzerland. The CD version peaked at No. 47 on the ARIA Albums Chart. The two CDs included in the set were recorded live at St. Gallen, whereas the DVD was recorded at the Sydney Opera House in 2004. The cover art was designed by John Butler Trio regular Tom Walker. On the Australian edition, the credits for the DVD include "In memory of Paul Hester", the original drummer from Crowded House. By the end of 2005 the album was certified gold by Australian Recording Industry Association (ARIA).

== Track listing ==
All songs were written by John Butler.

=== Disc one ===
1. "Treat Yo Mama" – 7:55
2. "Company Sin" – 5:11
3. "Somethings Gotta Give" – 3:24
4. "What You Want" – 8:35
5. "Band Introduction" – 0:25
6. "Oldman" – 5:49
7. "Ocean" – 11:38

=== Disc two ===
1. "Peaches and Cream" – 7:25
2. "Pickapart" – 6:45
3. "Betterman" – 16:44
4. "Hello" – 5:44
5. "Zebra" – 4:37
6. "Take" – 11:21

=== DVD ===
1. "Bound to Ramble"
2. "Attitude"
3. "Treat Yo Mama"
4. "Company Sin"
5. "Seeing Angels"
6. "Ocean"
7. "Peaches and Cream"
8. "Betterman"
9. "Somethings Gotta Give"
10. "Zebra"
11. "Interview with audience"

=== Bonus with sunrise over the sea ===
1. "Hello" – 5:44
2. "Zebra" – 4:37
3. "Peaches and Cream" – 7:25
4. "Ocean" – 11:38

== Personnel ==
The John Butler Trio are managed by Phil Stevens.

=== Band members ===
- John Butler - vocals, guitar
- Shannon Birchall - bass guitar
- Michael Barker - drums

=== Road crew ===
- Colin Ellis
- Julian Cribb
- Jane Wiltshire-Butler
- Stephane Popoff
- Cole Xuereb
- Rafael Lazzaro
- Julie Bright

=== Production ===
- Recording - DRS 3, Switzerland
- Engineering - Patrick Miller
- Mastering - Ron Kurz
- Additional editing - Shaun O'Callaghan
- Photography - Paul Smith Images, Twenty Twenty Imaging

== Charts ==
Chart (20005)	Peak position
Australian Albums (ARIA)	47

== Certifications ==
Region	Certification	Certified units/sales
Australia (ARIA)	Gold	35,000^{^}
^{^} Shipments figures based on certification alone.
