= The Groovesmiths =

Australian roots-music band, founded by Gavin Shoesmith

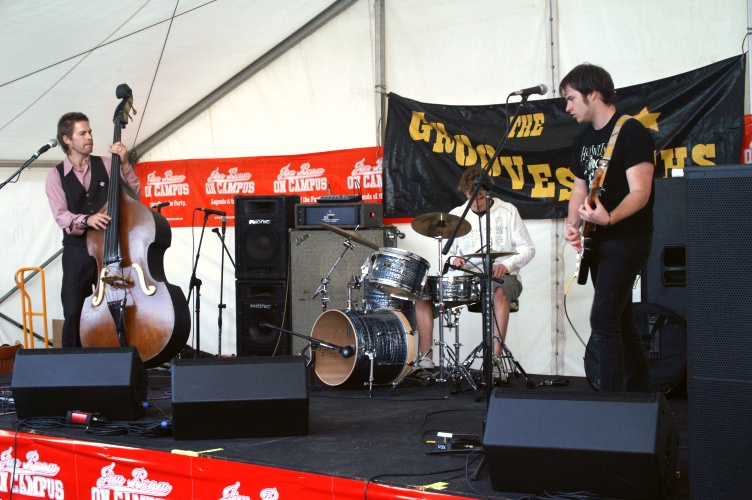
- The Groovesmiths performing at Curtin University in August 2007.

Background information
- Origin: Darwin, Northern Territory, Australia
- Genres: Roots
- Years active: 2004–present
- Labels: Independent, MGM
- Website: myspace.com/thegroovesmiths

The Groovesmiths are an Australian roots-music band, founded by Gavin Shoesmith, former bass guitarist from John Butler Trio. Originally located in Darwin, Northern Territory, Shoesmith relocated to Fremantle. The band is recognized for its unique style and live performances, blending strong elements of Reggae, Jazz, and Hip-Hop into traditional Blues and Roots music.

The Groovesmiths released a debut five-track extended play, Demonstrations of Intent, in 2006. It featured guests, John Butler and Saritah. In November 2007 the Groovesmiths with Shoesmith on lead vocals, bass guitar, lap steel bass and harmonica; Alex Dew on lead guitar; and Matt Wright on drums performed at the Blues at Bridgetown festival. A follow-up self-titled album was issued in July 2008 on MGM Distribution.

== Style and songwriting ==
Rockus Online Magazine's Dominic Pearce reviewed Demonstrations of Intent:

The hallmarks of roots music are all there; inflections of ska and reggae, acoustic percussion, steel & slide guitars, and lyrical content much in the vein of social awareness. The slight twist here, however, is that the rhythm and beat of the music sits much more in the area of hip-hop than blues or rock. The instrumental side of things is top notch. Guest appearances from West Australian roots-stalwart John Butler on Bushranger, and local diva Saritah on Lonely, certainly add flavor to the recipe.

Shoesmith explained that his song writing was partly based on experiences with indigenous Noongar peoples while growing up in Lockridge (a Perth suburb) and are also based on "general political topics, I'm quite a political animal, mainly Australian and a bit of general politics as well. I don't really try to write songs so much as they just come to me, I really try to write in metaphors, for example, there are songs on the album where the meanings are quite hidden in the metaphors."

== Discography ==
Extended plays

- Demonstrations of Intent (2006)

The band's debut EP features five original songs, written by Gavin Shoesmith.

1. "Bushranger" – 3:51
2. "Lonely" – 4:05
3. "Rebirth" – 5:04
4. "Viva La Revolution" – 3:33
5. "Oh the Sun Is Shining" – 4:35

The EP features performances from previous band-members Michael Boase (Drums) and Jesse Moore (Guitar), as well as John Butler (Lap-steel Guitar), Saritah (Vocals), Mark Robinson (Didgeridoo), and Francis Diatschenko (Guitar)

Albums

- The Groovesmiths (Hello Operator) 14 July 2008 MGM (MGM GS002)

The band's album featured four more of Shoesmith's songs as well as reworked versions of the five featured on the EP. Guitarist Alex Dew contributed "Sun and Moon".

1. "Bushranger" – 3:51
2. "Oh the Sun Is Shining"
3. "Red Fox"
4. "The Rebirth of Cool"
5. "Viva La Revolution"
6. "The Chant of Jimmy Blacksmith"
7. "The Gypsy Song"
8. "Sun and Moon"
9. "Blues and Roots"
10. "3AM Monday Morning'

The recording of their self-titled album saw the return of Mark Robinson on Didgeridoo as well as percussionist Walter Piccolruaz and drummer Matt Wright joining the core group of Shoesmith and Alex Dew. Sometimes erroneously called Hello Operator due to its cover art.
