= Mama Kin (musician) =

Australian singer-songwriter

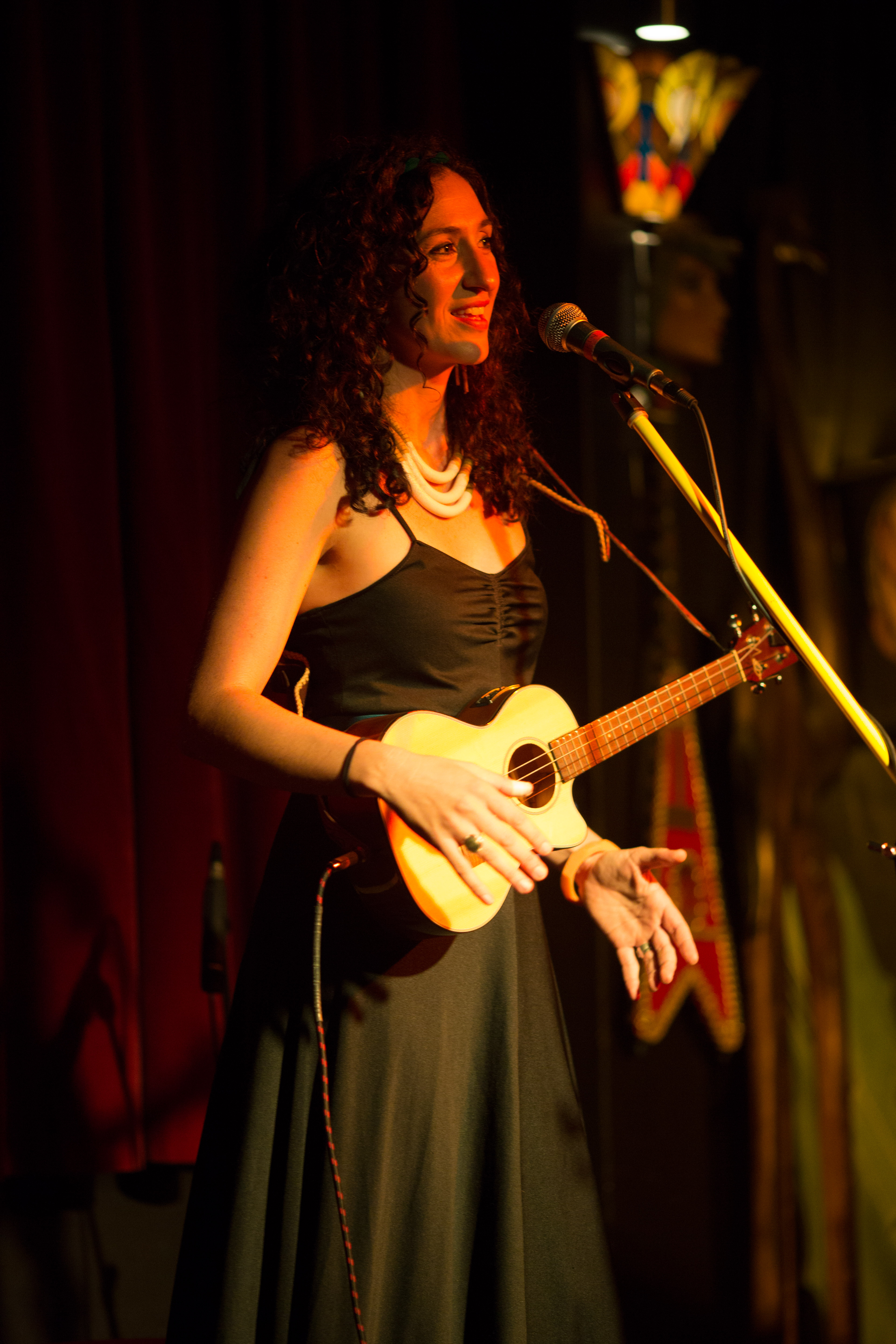
- Mama Kin in 2012

Background information
- Born: Danielle Caruana
- Occupation: Singer-songwriter
- Years active: 2006–present
- Member of: Mama Kin Spender
- Website: www.mamakin.com

Danielle Caruana, known professionally as Mama Kin, is an Australian singer-songwriter. She has released two albums, Beat and Holler and The Magician's Daughter. She lives with her family in Fremantle.

== Early life ==
Caruana grew up in the Melbourne suburb of Newport, the youngest, by some years, of six siblings by parents of Maltese extraction. The family was musical and she studied classical piano from the age of five to 16. Every child in the family was expected to play an instrument and to play in the family band in church and for members of the Maltese community who visited their house. Her strongest musical influence was her sister Carmen, 14 years older, with whom she sang and who taught her to harmonise, and who introduced her to lasting musical influences: blues and gospel, Aretha Franklin, Nina Simone, the Pretenders and Joan Armatrading. Other family influences were country, Jerry Lee Lewis, Johnny Cash, Dolly Parton, Ray Charles, Elvis Presley, the crooners, Stevie Wonder, Dr John, The Cure, The Police, Prince and Michael Jackson. Caruana says, "I loved all of it, because my brothers and sisters were into it. I couldn't imagine a life without music", but also that the musicality of her family inhibited her own career: "I was completely petrified. After having grown up under two really incredibly, incredibly diverse musical brothers and a really musical family, I think I just made a decision really early on that I wasn't good enough, that I wasn't as good as them."

== Career ==
Caruana first started writing songs in 2006. Prior to her solo career, she provided vocals on albums by her husband, John Butler. The Mama Kin band came about through playing with her brothers Nicky Bomba and Michael Caruana. The name Mama Kin was given her by Bomba, a former member of the John Butler Trio. Caruana says, "we were toying with the idea of doing a creative project together called Kin. A couple of days into the process I found out I was pregnant with my second child and he called me the Mama Kin." When it stuck as her band name she had not heard of the Aerosmith song. Caruana, her brother Michael on keyboards and drummer George Servanis are the principal members of the Mama Kin ensemble.

Mama Kin's first released recording was an EP, Papoose in 2008, followed by a single, "Tore My Heart Out", released in 2009. Her debut album, Beat and Holler, written almost entirely on an old Wurlitzer organ and recorded at The Compound, Fremantle and released in 2009. Of the album Caruana has said, "In almost every song, although it might sound like I'm talking about a partner, I'm generally talking about a part of myself." Beat and Holler was nominated for Best Blues and Roots Album at the AIR Awards of 2010.

Caruana's second album, The Magician's Daughter, was released on 22 February 2013. It is named after her mother, an actual magician's daughter. Caruana's grandfather worked as a professional magician in post-World War II Malta, and her mother, Iris, was one of his assistants. The album was written mostly from home and recorded at The Compound. It was produced by Jan Skubiszewski.

The Magician's Daughter was nominated for ARIA Award for Best Blues and Roots Album at the ARIA Music Awards of 2013.

Caruna joined with Dingo Spender from Offcutts to form Mama Kin Spender and they released the album Golden Magnetic in 2018. Golden Magnetic was nominated for an ARIA Award for Best Blues & Roots Album at the ARIA Music Awards of 2018.

In 2025 Caruana and Spender released their second studio album, Promises (as Mama Kin Spender), resulting in their third ARIA nomination for Best Blues & Roots Album at the ARIA Music Awards of 2025.

== Philanthropy and other activities ==
Caruana contributes to philanthropic activities in the fields of indigenous and environmental rights.

In February 2011 John Butler and Caruana performed as Brave and the Bird at the annual Gimme Shelter fundraising event for the homeless at the Fremantle Arts Centre, their set introduced by Kevin Rudd.

The Seed Fund, originally the JB Seed Fund, was set up in 2005 by Butler, Caruana and others with an initial donation of A$80,000, to help artists and musicians become self-sustained. Its flagship project is the Management Workshop, in which 25 emerging managers have three days of workshops with experienced industry managers of internationally known Australian bands. Caruana says the main motivation behind creating the organisation is to create community within the music industry.

In August 2023, Caruana was appointed as one of eight members of the newly-formed Music Australia Council, a division of Creative Australia (formerly Australia Council for the Arts).

== Personal life ==
Caruana met John Butler in Fremantle, Western Australia and they were married in Broome in 1999. Their home is in Fremantle. They have a daughter, Banjo, and a son, Jahli. Both children play music and Caruana credits having them, along with the Seed Fund, with starting her musical career. Of her musical relationship with her husband, she has said, "I love and respect his opinion, but we definitely have different tastes in music." Prior to beginning her solo musical career Caruana suffered from depression, an experience that has informed her songwriting and which she ascribes to her suppression of her musicality. She reports that one of her biggest discoveries was Transcendental Meditation and that, "When I first started this practice I remember thinking 'Oh, this is what sanity must feel like.'"

The John Butler Trio song "Daniella", from the group's 2007 album Grand National, is about Caruana.

== Discography ==
=== Studio albums ===
Title	Details
Beat and Holler	Released: 2009; Label: Mama Kin (MAMA003); Format: CD, digital download
The Magician's Daughter	Released: 22 February 2013; Label: Star House Collective (SHC004); Format: CD, digital download
Golden Magnetic (as Mama Kin Spender)	Released: 13 February 2018; Label: ABC Music (6728163); Format: CD, LP, streaming digital download

=== EPs ===
Title	Details
Papoose	Released: 4 October 2008; Label: Mama Kin; Format: Digital download
Talisman	Released: March 2013; Label: Mama Kin; Format: Digital download
Are You Listening? (as Mama Kin Spender)	Released: 9 April 2020; Label: Mama Kin Spender; Format: Digital download, streaming

== Awards and nominations ==
=== AIR Awards ===
The Australian Independent Record Awards (commonly known informally as AIR Awards) is an annual awards night to recognise, promote and celebrate the success of Australia's Independent Music sector.

Year	Nominee / work	Award	Result
2010	Beat and Holler	Best Blues and Roots Album	Nominated
2013	The Magician's Daughter	Best Blues and Roots Album	Nominated

=== ARIA Music Awards ===
The ARIA Music Awards is an annual awards ceremony that recognises excellence, innovation, and achievement across all genres of Australian music.

Year	Nominee / work	Award	Result	Lost to
2013	The Magician's Daughter	Best Blues & Roots Album	Nominated	Russell Morris - Sharkmouth
2018	Golden Magnetic (as Mama Kin Spender)	Best Blues & Roots Album	Nominated	Tash Sultana - Flow State
2025	Promises (as Mama Kin Spender)	Best Blues & Roots Album	Nominated	The Teskey Brothers – Live At The Hammersmith Apollo

=== West Australian Music Industry Awards ===
The West Australian Music Industry Awards (WAMIs) are annual awards presented to the local contemporary music industry, put on annually by the Western Australian Music Industry Association Inc (WAM).

Year	Nominee / work	Award	Result (wins only)
2013	Mama Kin	Best Folk Act	Won
2018	Mama Kin Spender	Best Blues / Roots Act	Won
