= Saritah =

- Born: Sarah Louise Newman; Seoul, South Korea
- Origin: Perth, Western Australia, Australia
- Genres: Reggae; dub
- Occupation: Singer-songwriter
- Instruments: Vocals; guitar
- Years active: 2000–present
- Label: MGM
- Website: saritah.com

Saritah is an Australian-based singer-songwriter and musician. She was born in Seoul, South Korea, raised in Perth, Australia and has also lived in France, Spain, London (UK) and Los Angeles, California. She has released three full-length albums, Gratitude (31 May 2004), Ancient Forward (10 August 2009) and Dig Deep (5 November 2012) as well as an EP These Days/You’re The One and many singles and music videos.

== Biography ==
Sarah Louise "Saritah" Newman, was born in Seoul, South Korea to an English-born father and a South Korean mother. The Newman family relocated to Perth when Saritah was an infant. She took piano lessons from six-years-old and began song writing on guitar from 15. After seeing Malian musician, Rokia Traoré, she was inspired to start her music career "I saw her show and I was actually in tears. She just moved me deeply, that I had to do this. I have to make this my life." She explained her stage name, "My birth name is Sarah... but phonetically in Korean, it means 'constant renewal and transgression'. Saritah comes from when I went to Spain... in their accent it became Sarit-ah, it's an affection nickname."

In 2000 she teamed with Nathan "Floods" Winterflood on drums, bass guitar and percussion (of Seahorse Radio) to record a four-track extended play, Saritah. Three tracks were co-written by the duo while Saritah wrote the other track, "Temple". She followed with another four-track EP, Saritah Sampler, in 2002, which included the tracks, "Gratitude" and "Safe Again". "Safe Again" also appeared on a various artists 3× CD compilation album, Kiss My WAMI 2002.

Saritah debut studio album, Gratitude, was issued independently in May 2004 using MGM Distribution. In 2006 she performed on the Perth leg of the Big Day Out. She appeared at the Fremantle Fringe Festival in March–April 2007. As of August 2009 she was living in Melbourne. Also in that month she released her second album, Ancient Forward, which Reverb magazine's reviewer felt was "an important, inspiring and extremely relevant album." It was recorded at Brisbane's Tanuki Lounge with Paulie Bromley (bass guitarist of the Beautiful Girls) as producer. She toured across Australia and internationally: "performing over 400 live shows" from 2005 to 2009.

Saritah's third album, Dig Deep, appeared in November 2012, via MGM Distribution. According to Eve Jeffery of The Echo "[it] reveals an artist at the next level of her career." The album was recorded in Montecito, California, and was partly produced by Mario Caldato Jr. (Beastie Boys, Manu Chao, Jack Johnson, John Butler Trio, Beck). Jeffrey explained how "[the] songs deals with personal evolution as the starting point for global revolution... [for] a vibrant, rich album that unites roots reggae, dancehall, pop and nu-soul flavours on a courageous journey through universal conditions of joy, loss, inspiration and faith." A single, "Tears of Joy", was released ahead of the album, in September 2012.

== Discography ==
=== Albums ===
- Gratitude (31 May 2004)
- Ancient Forward (10 August 2009) Time to Shine
- Dig Deep (5 November 2012)

=== Extended plays ===
- Saritah (2000)
- Saritah Sampler (2002)
- These Days/You're the One (19 September 2005)
