= Gavin Shoesmith =

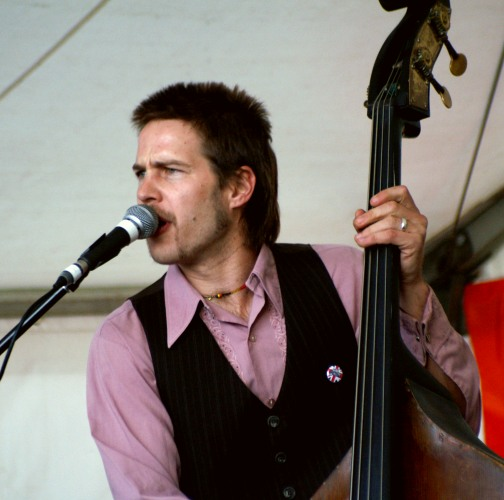
- Gavin Shoesmith with The Groovesmiths, Curtin University, Perth, August 2007

Background information
- Birth name: Gavin Dominic Shoesmith
- Origin: Fremantle, Western Australia, Australia
- Genres: Roots
- Occupation(s): Musician, song writer
- Instrument(s): Double bass, bass guitar, singing, harmonica
- Years active: 1994–present

Gavin Dominic Shoesmith is an Australian singer, songwriter, double bassist and bass guitarist. He was a founding member of the John Butler Trio, from 1998 to 2001. In 2004 he formed a roots music group, the Groovesmiths.

== Biography ==
In the early 1990s Shoesmith was a member of Moustache 750 on double bass, contrabass and acoustic bass guitar. In 1995 he formed Woodcave as a jam band, which later included John Butler on lead vocals and guitar. Shoesmith, Butler and Jason McGann on drums formed John Butler Trio as a roots music and jam band.

In 2001 Shoesmith, on double bass, formed an organic dance music band, Katamaran, based in Darwin. The band included Mark Hoffman on didgeridoo and Grant Smith on percussion. In its one year of existence, Katamaran, released an album, Didge Drum Bass, it sold around 5,000 copies. In 2004 Shoesmith formed the Groovesmiths Nu Jazz Ensemble as a roots music group.
