= Zebra (The John Butler Trio song) =

2003 single by John Butler Trio

Single by the John Butler Trio

from the album Sunrise Over Sea
- B-side: "Media" (live); "Losing My Cool"
- Released: 1 December 2003
- Length: 3:56
- Label: Jarrah
- Songwriter: John Butler
- Producer: John Butler

The John Butler Trio singles chronology
"Betterman" (2001)	"Zebra" (2003)	"What You Want" (2004)

"Zebra" is a song by Australian band the John Butler Trio, released as the first single from their third studio album, Sunrise Over Sea (2004). It features the Sunrise lineup of John Butler on guitar and vocals, Shannon Birchall on double bass and Nicky Bomba on drums and percussion. "Zebra" became a top-30 hit in both Australia and New Zealand, reaching numbers 22 and 27, respectively. In the United States, it peaked at number 12 on the Billboard Triple-A chart in April 2005.

== Inspiration ==
According to John Butler, the song began as a riff that he had stuck in his head for several years, but had difficulty recalling when he had a guitar. The lyric pattern of "I could be da da, I could be da da" originated from Butler scat singing the riff to his baby daughter, while the opposites in each line of the lyrics led Nicky Bomba to the idea of a zebra asking itself if it was white with black stripes or black with white stripes, from which the song's title is derived.

== Music video ==
The music video for "Zebra" features Butler and the band recording the song in a studio which seems like a small, worn-out backyard shed. It is also interspersed with footage of Butler on his skateboard.

== Track listings ==
All tracks were written by John Butler.

1. "Zebra" – 3:56
2. "Media" (Live at the Wireless for Triple J) – 7:10
3. "Losing My Cool" (previously unreleased) – 8:10

== Personnel ==
John Butler Trio

- John Butler – Amplified 11-string acoustic guitar, banjo, lead vocals
- Shannon Birchall – Double bass, electric bass, backing vocals
- Nicky Bomba – Drums, percussion, backing vocals

Additional musicians

- Michael Barker – cookie spoons, congas (Track 1)
- Michael Caruana – Hammond organ (Track 1)
- Dave Pensabene – backing vocals (Track 1)

== Charts ==
=== Weekly charts ===
Weekly chart performance for "Zebra"
Chart (2004–2005)	Peak position
Australia (ARIA)	22
New Zealand (Recorded Music NZ)	27
US Triple-A (Billboard)	12

=== Year-end charts ===
2004 year-end chart performance for "Zebra"
Chart (2004)	Position
Australia (ARIA)	97

2005 year-end chart performance for "Zebra"
Chart (2005)	Position
US Triple-A (Billboard)	37

== Certifications ==
Certifications for "Zebra"
Region	Certification	Certified units/sales
Australia (ARIA)	2× Platinum	140,000^{‡}
New Zealand (RMNZ)	Platinum	30,000^{‡}
^{‡} Sales+streaming figures based on certification alone.

== Release history ==
Release dates and formats for "Zebra"
Region	Date	Format(s)	Label(s)	Ref.
Australia	1 December 2003	CD	Jarrah	
United States	18 January 2005	Triple-A radio	Jarrah; Lava; WEA	
United States	28 March 2005	Alternative radio	Jarrah; Lava; WEA	
