= Something's Gotta Give (The John Butler Trio song) =

"Somethings Gotta Give"

Single by The John Butler Trio
- Released: 6 December 2004
- Recorded: Track 1: Woodstock Studios, Melbourne; Tracks 2 & 3: Hordern Pavilion, Sydney (9 July 2004)
- Genre: Funk, roots
- Length: 13:01
- Label: Jarrah
- Songwriter: John Butler
- Producer: John Butler

The John Butler Trio singles chronology
"What You Want" (2004)	"Somethings Gotta Give" (2004)	"Funky Tonight" (2006)

"Somethings Gotta Give" is a 2004 single written by John Butler and performed by the John Butler Trio. Released on 6 December 2004, in Australia only, "Somethings Gotta Give" is a blend of funk, rock, blues, roots, and the traditional sound of a jam band. The cover art was designed and photographed by regular Tom Walker, and features a blurred image of fans dancing at a concert.

On the ARIA Singles Chart it peaked at No. 47, while it was listed at No. 7 on Triple J's Hottest 100 of 2004.

The Ben Joss and Tribal directed music video was nominated for Best Video at the ARIA Music Awards of 2005.

== Track listing ==
All tracks written by John Butler, and mixed/engineered by Robyn Mai

1. "Somethings Gotta Give" – 3:05
2. "Ocean" [live] – 6:07
3. "Somethings Gotta Give" [live] – 3.49

== Personnel ==
- John Butler – Amplified 11-String Acoustic Guitar, Vocals
- Shannon Birchall – Double Bass, Backing Vocals
- Michael Barker – Drums, Percussion, Backing Vocals

== Trivia ==
- The single is an Enhanced CD and contains the film clip for "Somethings Gotta Give" when put in a PC.
- The single was released in Australia only.
- On recent versions of Sunrise Over Sea, the song is featured as a bonus track and is followed by 7:09 minutes of ambient sounds and cheeping birds.
- The music video for the single stars former Round the Twist star Jeffrey Walker, and features a cameo from Blue King Brown singer Natalie Pa'apa'a.
