= Mama Kin Spender =

Australian music duo

- Origin: Australia
- Years active: 2017–present
- Members: Mama Kin; Dingo Spender

Mama Kin Spender is an Australian music duo made up of Mama Kin (Danielle Caruana) and Dingo Spender (Spender). They released their debut album Golden Magnetic in 2018, which was nominated for the ARIA Award for Best Blues and Roots Album. Their sophomore album Promises was released in August 2025 and debuted at number 20 on the ARIA Albums Chart. Promises was also nominated for Best Blues and Roots Album at the 2025 ARIA Awards.

== Career ==
The duo have performed at festivals including WOMADelaide, Woodford, Perth Festival, Darwin Festival and Vivid, and have toured across Australia, North America and Ireland. In 2020, they released the EP Are You Listening?.

In February 2026, Mama Kin Spender premiered Promises & Wild Beasts, a theatrical adaptation of the Promises album directed by Craig Ilott, at Perth Festival. The production sold out its run at The Embassy, Perth Town Hall.

== Members ==
- Mama Kin - vocals, drums
- Dingo Spender - vocals, guitar

== Discography ==
=== Studio albums ===
Title	Details	Peak chart positions
Title	Details	AUS
Golden Magnetic	Released: 13 February 2018; Label: ABC Music (6728163); Format: CD, LP, streaming digital download	—
Promises	Released: 15 August 2025; Label: Self-released/MGM; Format: CD, LP, streaming, digital download	20

=== EPs ===
Title	Details
Are You Listening?	Released: 9 April 2020; Label: Mama Kin Spender; Format: Digital download, streaming

== Awards and nominations ==
=== ARIA Music Awards ===
The ARIA Music Awards is an annual awards ceremony that recognises excellence, innovation, and achievement across all genres of Australian music.

Year	Nominee / work	Award	Result
2018	Golden Magnetic	Best Blues & Roots Album	Nominated
2025	Promises	Best Blues & Roots Album	Nominated

=== West Australian Music Industry Awards ===
The West Australian Music Industry Awards (WAMIs) are annual awards presented to the local contemporary music industry, put on annually by the Western Australian Music Industry Association Inc (WAM).

Year	Nominee / work	Award	Result (wins only)
2013	Mama Kin	Best Folk Act	Won
2018	Mama Kin Spender	Best Blues / Roots Act	Won
