= Sunrise Over Sea =

Studio album by The John Butler Trio
- Released: 8 March 2004
- Recorded: 2003
- Studio: Woodstock Studios, Melbourne
- Genre: Roots
- Length: 71:11
- Label: Jarrah/MGM
- Producer: John Butler

The John Butler Trio chronology
Living 2001-2002 (2003)	Sunrise Over Sea (2004)	Live at St. Gallen (2005)

Singles from Sunrise Over Sea
- 1. "Zebra" Released: 2003; 2. "What You Want" Released: 2004; 3. "Something's Gotta Give" Released: 2004

Professional ratings
Review scores
Source	Rating
Allmusic	link
musicOMH	Favourable link
NZ Herald	(29 May 2004)

Sunrise Over Sea is the third studio album by Australian band the John Butler Trio. It was released in March 2004.

== Conception and production ==
In late 2003, John Butler entered Woodstock Studios in Melbourne, which is owned by Joe Camilleri, the leader of Jo Jo Zep & The Falcons and the Black Sorrows. He had a new band consisting of percussionist Nicky Bomba and upright-bass player Shannon Birchall. This would be Bomba's only recording with the Trio (having returned to his own reggae band) until April Uprising (2010) The sound engineer for this production was Robin Mai.

John Butler told the Australian edition of Rolling Stone published in April 2004 that he wanted greater freedom to pursue his vision. "Essentially what I learnt out of this process was, more so than ever, I'm the keeper of the music. I have the intuition and the foresight to pick the right players to my music. I've learned it's not always about having the same players for five, six or 10 years, it’s having the right chemistry for these songs at this time. Some of my favourite Jimi Hendrix music is off-the-cuff stuff with Band of Gypsys."

The title Sunrise Over Sea is probably a reference to his home in Byron Bay, which is one of the most easterly points in Australia and therefore one of the first points to see the sunrise. It is also part of the lyrics to the song "Peaches & Cream."

All the songs on the album were written, arranged and produced by John Butler, except for "What You Want" where the string section was arranged by Shannon Birchall and John Butler and was scored and conducted by Shannon Birchall.

Additional musicians performing on the album include: Michael Barker – "Treat Yo Mama", "Company Sin", "Bound To Ramble", Seeing Angels", "There'll Come a Time", "Zebra"; Danielle Caruna – "Treat Yo Mama", "Peaches & Cream", "What You Want", "Sometime"; Michael Caruna – "Zebra"; Dave Pensabene – "Zebra"; Tim Neil – "Sometimes"

Recent editions of the album have included the bonus track "Something's Gotta Give", which was released on an EP in 2004. It is a politically charged song that was very successful off the back of the recent LP.

In August 2004, a new disc, What You Want was released, with the song "What You Want" (Shared by Sunrise over Sea) and including a new version of the song "Treat Yo' Mama" and a cover of The Beatles' song "Across the Universe".

== Commercial performance ==
The album debuted at number one in the Australian album charts on 15 March 2004 and achieved gold record status in its first week of release. "Zebra" was released in December 2003 and made the ARIA singles charts in early 2004. It was number 8 in the Triple J Hottest 100 for 2003 and also had significant airplay on commercial FM radio across Australia. This was the first fully independent album (independent label/independent distributor) to debut at number 1 on the Australian Record Industry Association (ARIA) albums chart. In 2011, Sunrise Over Sea was certified five times platinum in Australia.

== Track listing ==
=== Australian release ===
1. "Treat Yo Mama" – 4:47
2. "Peaches and Cream" – 6:47
3. "Company Sin" – 4:39
4. "What You Want" – 5:21
5. "Damned to Hell" – 1:49
6. "Hello" – 4:26
7. "Bound to Ramble" – 6:08
8. "Seeing Angels" – 6:14
9. "There'll Come a Time" – 3:36
10. "Zebra" – 3:57
11. "Mist" – 2:25
12. "Oldman" – 5:10
13. "Sometimes" – 10:37

=== US release ===
1. "Treat Yo Mama" – 4:47
2. "Peaches and Cream" – 6:47
3. "Company Sin" – 4:39
4. "Betterman" – 3:44
5. "What You Want" – 5:21
6. "Damned to Hell" – 1:49
7. "Hello" – 4:26
8. "Bound to Ramble" – 6:08
9. "Seeing Angels" – 6:14
10. "There'll Come a Time" – 3:36
11. "Zebra" – 3:57
12. "Mist" – 2:25
13. "Oldman" – 5:10
14. "Sometimes" – 10:37

=== International Release ===
1. "Treat Yo Mama" – 4:47
2. "Peaches and Cream" – 6:47
3. "Company Sin" – 4:39
4. "What You Want" – 5:21
5. "Damned to Hell" – 1:49
6. "Hello" – 4:26
7. "Bound to Ramble" – 6:08
8. "Seeing Angels" – 6:14
9. "There'll Come a Time" – 3:36
10. "Zebra" – 3:57
11. "Mist" – 2:25
12. "Oldman" – 5:10
13. "Sometimes" – 11:05 (Includes :28 of silence)
14. "Something's Gotta Give" – 10:14 (Includes 7:07 of silence and ambience)

== Personnel ==
John Butler Trio

- John Butler – vocals, guitars; banjo (tracks 5, 7, 8), lapsteel (track 1), E-Bow (track 9), string arrangements (track 4)
- Shannon Birchall – double bass; electric bass (tracks 9, 13), vocals (tracks 7, 13), piano (track 3), strings (track 4), string arrangements (track 4)
- Nicky Bomba – drums; vocals (tracks 7, 10, 13), tambourine (tracks 4, 6), shakers (tracks 3, 9), djembe (tracks 1, 11), sticks (track 3), tikky tak electric guitar (track 3)

Additional musicians

- Michael Barker – congas (tracks 1, 3, 10), tambourine (tracks 1, 3), marimba (tracks 8, 9), darumbukka (track 1), marching bass drum (track 7), cymbals (track 7), kooky spoon solo (track 10)
- Danielle Caruana – backing vocals (tracks 1, 2, 4, 13)
- Michael Caruana – Hammond organ (track 10)
- Dave Pensabene – backing vocals (track 10)
- Tim Neil – Hammond organ (track 13)

== Charts ==
=== Weekly charts ===
Chart (2004–2005)	Peak position
Australian Albums (ARIA)	1
French Albums (SNEP)	36
New Zealand Albums (RMNZ)	9

=== Year-end charts ===
Chart (2004)	Peak position
Australian (ARIA Charts)	5
Chart (2005)	Peak position
Australian (ARIA Charts)	58

=== Decade-end chart ===
Chart (2000–2009)	Position
Australian Albums (ARIA)	51

== Certifications ==
Region	Certification	Certified units/sales
Australia (ARIA)	4× Platinum	280,000^{^}
^{^} Shipments figures based on certification alone.
