= Living 2001–2002 =

Living 2001-2002

Live album by The John Butler Trio
- Released: 10 February 2003
- Recorded: The Forum, Melbourne, Victoria – 3 November 2001; The Forum, Melbourne, Victoria – 6 April 2002; University of Western Australia, Crawley, Western Australia – 12 April 2002; Arena Joondalup, Western Australia – 13 October 2002
- Genre: Roots
- Label: Jarrah
- Producer: John Butler

The John Butler Trio chronology
Three (2001)	Living 2001-2002 (2003)	Sunrise Over Sea (2004)

Living 2001–2002 is a double live album from Australian jam band John Butler Trio. The album was released in February 2003 and debuted at #6 on the ARIA album charts and went on to achieve platinum sales.

== Track listing ==
All tracks are written by John Butler

Living 2001-2002 – Disc 1
No.	Title	Length
1.	"Attitude" (recorded live at The Forum, Melbourne, Victoria, 3 November 2001 by Chris Thompson)	5:33
2.	"Pickapart" (recorded live at the Forum, Melbourne, Victoria, 6 April 2002 by Dave McCluney)	7:53
3.	"Valley" (recorded live at The University of Western Australia (UWA), Perth, Western Australia, Friday 12 April 2002 by James Hewgill)	18:26
4.	"Spring" (recorded live at The Forum, Melbourne, Victoria, 3 November 2001 by Chris Thompson)	6:01
5.	"Crazy" (recorded live at the Forum, Melbourne, Victoria, 6 April 2002 by Dave McCluney)	7:50
6.	"Colours" (recorded live at The Forum, Melbourne, Victoria, 3 November 2001 by Chris Thompson)	7:50
7.	"Treat Your Mama" (recorded live at the Forum, Melbourne, Victoria, 6 April 2002 by Dave McCluney)	7:42

Living 2001-2002 – Disc 2
No.	Title	Length
1.	"Sista" (recorded live at Rock-It Festival, Joondalup Arena, Western Australia, Sunday 13 October 2002 by James Hewgill)	4:10
2.	"Earthbound Child" (recorded live at the Forum, Melbourne, Victoria, 6 April 2002 by Dave McCluney)	5:44
3.	"Betterman" (recorded live at the Forum, Melbourne, Victoria, 6 April 2002 by Dave McCluney)	8:25
4.	"Don't Understand" (recorded live at the Forum, Melbourne, Victoria, 6 April 2002 by Dave McCluney)	15:16
5.	"Believe" (recorded live at the Forum, Melbourne, Victoria, 3 November 2001 by Chris Thompson)	4:41
6.	"Money" (recorded live at the Forum, Melbourne, Victoria, 3 November 2001 by Chris Thompson)	16:04
7.	"Take" (recorded live at The University of Western Australia (UWA), Perth, Western Australia, Friday 12 April 2002 by James Hewgill)	10:21
8.	"Home Is Where the Heart Is" (studio version)	3:05

== Personnel ==
- John Butler – electrified/acoustic 11 string guitars, vocals; percussion on "Take"
- Rory Quirk – electric bass, double bass; percussion on "Take"
- Jason McGann – drums, percussion, backing vocals
- Andrew Fry – electric bass on "Earthbound Child"; double bass, backing vocals on "Home is Where the Heart Is"

=== Additional musicians ===
- Paul Boon – didgeridoo on "Earthbound Child"

== Charts ==
=== Weekly charts ===
Chart (2003–04)	Peak position
Australian Albums (ARIA)	6

=== Year-end charts ===
Chart (2003)	Peak position
Australian (ARIA Charts)	97

== Certifications ==
Region	Certification	Certified units/sales
Australia (ARIA)	Platinum	70,000^{^}
^{^} Shipments figures based on certification alone.
