= JBT (EP) =

JBT EP

EP by the John Butler Trio
- Released: 2000
- Recorded: Studio Couch - Fremantle, Western Australia
- Genres: Rock, alternative, roots
- Length: 15:33
- Label: IndependentMGM Distribution
- Producers: John Butler; Shaun O'Callaghan

The John Butler Trio chronology
John Butler (1998)	JBT EP (2000)	Three (2001)

JBT EP, also known as the Pickapart EP, is a four track EP from Australian jam band the John Butler Trio. "Pickapart", "Don't Understand" and "Earthbound Child" would then make it onto the U.S. version of their LP Three, but none of the tracks were re-used in the Australian release of that album.

The album art was designed by Insomnia Design, and features the same graphic art of a tree that is on the Trio's independent record label Jarrah Records, run by their manager Phil Stevens.

== Track listing ==
All tracks written by John Butler

1. "Pickapart" – 2:59
2. "Don't Understand" – 4:30
3. "Earthbound Child" – 3:50
4. "Trees" – 4:14

== Performers ==
- John Butler - amplified/acoustic 11 string guitar
- Gavin Shoesmith - electric & double bass
- Jason McGann - drums, percussion
