= John Butler (album) =

First full length album by the John Butler Trio

Studio album by The John Butler Trio
- Released: 27 December 1998
- Recorded: Studio Couch, Fremantle
- Genre: Roots
- Length: 64:08
- Label: Independent/MGM Distribution
- Producer: John Butler

The John Butler Trio chronology
Searching for Heritage (1996)	John Butler (1998)	JBT EP (2000)

John Butler is the first full-length album by the John Butler Trio, released 27 December 1998.

It was recorded at Studio Couch, Fremantle and engineered by George Nikoloudis and Shaun O'Callaghan, mixed by Shaun O'Callaghan and George Nikoloudis and mastered by Shaun O'Callaghan and Richard Mahony at Studio Couch and Toad Hall.

All music and lyrics were written, arranged and produced by John Butler, except for the words of the chorus in "Colours" which were from Sly and the Family Stone.

With Jason McGann on drums and Gavin Shoesmith on bass, the first version of the group recorded the album in December 1998 which was launched at Mojos Bar in North Fremantle.

== Track listing ==
All songs written and composed by John Butler, except where noted.

John Butler
No.	Title	Length
1.	"Valley"	8:34
2.	"Inspiration"	5:18
3.	"Busted"	7:40
4.	"Sista"	3:18
5.	"Ocean"	12:28
6.	"Colours" (the words of the chorus are from Sly and the Family Stone)	9:05
7.	"Crazy"	5:29
8.	"Keeper"	5:00
9.	"Under an Indian Sky"	7:39
Total length:		64:08

== Release history ==
Region	Date	Label	Format	Catalog
Australia	27 December 1998	Independent	CD	JB-002
Australia	13 November 2000	MGM Distribution	CD	JBT001

== Personnel ==
- John Butler - resonator [Dobro] guitar, guitar [11 string], vocals
- Gavin Shoesmith - bass guitar and double bass
- Jason McGann - percussion

== Credits ==
- Arrangements, Artwork, Producer - John Butler
- Artwork [Design, Layout] - Peter Nicol
- Engineer, Mixer - George Nikoloudis, Shaun O'Callaghan
- Mastering - Richard Mahony, Shaun O'Callaghan
- Photography [Disc Pic] - Tony Gajewski
- Photography [Photos Of John Butler's Art Pieces] - Danny Khoo

== Certifications ==
Region	Certification	Certified units/sales
Australia (ARIA)	Gold	35,000^{^}
^{^} Shipments figures based on certification alone.
