= Three (The John Butler Trio album) =

Studio album by John Butler Trio
- Released: 18 April 2001
- Recorded: Studio Couch - North Fremantle
- Genre: Bluegrass, alternative rock
- Length: 65:08
- Label: Independent (Aus); ATO Records (US)
- Producer: John Butler Trio; Shaun O'Callaghan

John Butler Trio chronology
JBT EP (2000)	Three (2001)	Living 2001-2002 (2003)

Professional ratings
Review scores
Source	Rating
Allmusic	4/5 stars

Three is the second studio album of Australian jam band The John Butler Trio.

All the music and lyrics were written and arranged by John Butler except Earthbound Child, which Ozzie Rea co-wrote. The album was recorded, engineered and mixed by Shaun O'Callaghan at Studio Couch, North Fremantle, Western Australia. Robin Mai, Nicky Bomba, and Joe Camilleri mastered it at Woodstock Studios. The John Butler Trio and Shaun O'Callaghan produced the album. John Butler designed the cover concept with Matt and Iowana at Insomnia Design.

There were guest appearances by:

- Paul Boon - didgeridoo
- George Rrurrambu - intro vocals on "Money"
- Rosie Johnstone, David Broadfoot & Brenda Fost - backing vocals

In 2001, Three won the ARIA Award for Best Independent Release.

In the United States, it was released on ATO Records, with a few more tracks than the Australian CD - partly because it was the first John Butler Trio album released in the United States.

== Australian track listing ==
All music and lyrics written and arranged by John Butler.

1. "Betterman" – 8:16
2. "Attitude" – 6:09
3. "Media" – 5:19
4. "Believe" – 3:59
5. "Take" – 8:01
6. "Life Ain't What It Seems" – 7:04
7. "Money" – 11:33
8. "Foundation" – 14:47

== U.S. track listing ==
1. "Betterman" – 8:19
2. "Attitude" – 6:13
3. "Media" – 6:04
4. "Believe" – 4:02
5. "Take" – 8:05
6. "Life Ain't What It Seems" – 8:14
7. "Money" – 11:33
8. "Pickapart – 2:59
9. "Earthbound Child – 3:50
10. "Don't Understand" – 4:31

== Charts ==
=== Weekly charts ===
Chart (2001)	Peak position
Australian Albums (ARIA)	24

=== Year-end charts ===
Chart (2001)	Peak position
Australian (ARIA Charts)	88
Chart (2002)	Peak position
Australian (ARIA Charts)	67

== Certifications ==
Region	Certification	Certified units/sales
Australia (ARIA)	Platinum	70,000^{^}
^{^} Shipments figures based on certification alone.
