= Flesh & Blood (John Butler Trio album) =

Studio album by John Butler Trio
- Released: 7 February 2014
- Recorded: The Compound, Fremantle - 2013
- Genre: Roots
- Length: 51:58
- Labels: Jarrah Records; MGM Records
- Producer: John Butler

John Butler Trio chronology
April Uprising (2010)	Flesh & Blood (2014)	Home (2018)

Singles from Flesh & Blood
- 1. "Only One" Released: 14 November 2013

Flesh & Blood is the sixth studio album by Australian roots band the John Butler Trio. The album, produced by Jan Skubiszewski, was recorded over 20 days at Butler's studio 'The Compound' during December 2012, with extra recording sessions taking place in 2013. The photograph used on the album cover was taken in Butler's backyard shed at his home. The album was released on 7 February 2014 in Australia, with releases in other countries occurring within the same week. An international tour took place across 2014 to help promote the album's release. The album debuted and peaked at number 2 on the ARIA Albums Chart and was certified gold by the Australian Recording Industry Association for shipments exceeding 35,000 copies.

== Background and release ==
The early sessions for the John Butler Trio's sixth studio album commenced in mid-2013, following the band's largest tour of the US. For the first time in the band's lifetime, the members began with a blank songwriting slate, rather than using the initial ideas Butler had introduced. The trio gathered at The Compound in Fremantle, Western Australia - which serves as the band's headquarters and the frontman's artistic space - and co-wrote material for the first time, deviating from the Butler-centric process of the past. After contributing a large portion of work towards the album, Bomba eventually left The Compound and the trio to focus on his own Melbourne Ska Orchestra project and was replaced by Grant Gerathy.

Butler explained in an interview during the band's US tour:

But a lot of these songs on this album I kind of magpied. Magpies are this bird in Australia that takes shiny things from anywhere and builds its nest, and so that’s kind of what I do. I’ll take a little of my own experience of having some heavy party time with certain friends, and then I’ll hear some other stories about addicts or other intense relationships. I’ll put them into the mixing pot and make up these characters to explore different possibilities and emotional landscapes.

One of the songs on the album, "Wings Are Wide", was written as a dedication to his grandmother, who gave Butler his grandfather's Dobro guitar that became the foundation for his songwriting. Butler admitted that "I wasn’t at all into roots music or playing the slide or anything when I got it, and it sat under my bed for a long, long time." Released in Australia on 8 February 2014, Flesh and Blood was produced by Jan Skubiszewski and features a vocal duet with Ainslie Wills.

The first single from the album was "Only One", which was released for digital download on 14 November 2013, followed by a lyric video on YouTube on 18 November 2013, then followed up by an official music video on 3 December 2013. The single peaked at No. 44 on the ARIA Singles Chart.

== Disc 1 Track Listing ==
1. "Spring to Come" 4:13
2. "Livin' in the City" 3:28
3. "Cold Wind" 4:57
4. "Bullet Girl" 5:20
5. "Devil Woman" 3:00
6. "Blame It On Me" 6:08
7. "Only One" 3:39
8. "Young and Wild" 5:36
9. "Wings Are Wide" 5:51
10. "How You Sleep at Night" 4:13
11. "You're Free" 5:33

== Disc 2 Track Listing (Best Buy Exclusive) ==
1. "Runaround" 3:27
2. "Higher" 4:03

== Personnel ==
- John Butler - vocals (all tracks), acoustic 6-string guitar (tracks 1, 3, 4, 7, 8, 9, 10), amplified 6-string guitar (tracks 4, 7, 9, 10), electric 6-string guitar (tracks 2, 3, 5, 6), amplified/acoustic Weissenborn guitar (track 11), Wurlitzer (track 1), ebow (track 3)
- Bryon Luiters - electric bass (tracks 2, 4, 5, 6, 10), fretless bass (tracks 1, 7), Moog bass (tracks 2, 3, 9, 10, 11), double bass (track 8), vocals (tracks 1, 2, 3, 4, 5, 6, 7, 9, 10), organ (tracks 2, 5, 6, 7), synths (tracks 2, 3, 10, 11), clavinet (tracks 5, 6), Wurlitzer (track 4), upright piano (track 8)
- Nicky Bomba - drums & percussion (tracks 1–9, 11), vocals (tracks 1, 2, 3, 5, 6, 9), steel pans (tracks 7, 9, 11)
- Grant Gerathy - drums (track 10), vocals (track 10)
- Ainslie Wills - vocals (track 8)
- Jan Skubiszewski - producer (all tracks)

== Charts ==
=== Weekly charts ===
Chart (2014)	Peak position
Australian Albums (ARIA)	2
Belgian Albums (Ultratop Flanders)	152
Belgian Albums (Ultratop Wallonia)	95
French Albums (SNEP)	29
Hungarian Albums (MAHASZ)	7
New Zealand Albums (RMNZ)	32
Scottish Albums (Official Charts)	92
Swiss Albums (Schweizer Hitparade)	53
UK Albums (Official Charts)	97
UK Independent Albums (Official Charts)	18

=== Year-end charts ===
Chart (2014)	Position
Australian Albums Chart	47

== Certifications ==
Region	Certification	Certified units/sales
Australia (ARIA)	Gold	35,000^{^}
^{^} Shipments figures based on certification alone.
