= Nicky Bomba =

Australian musician (born 1963)

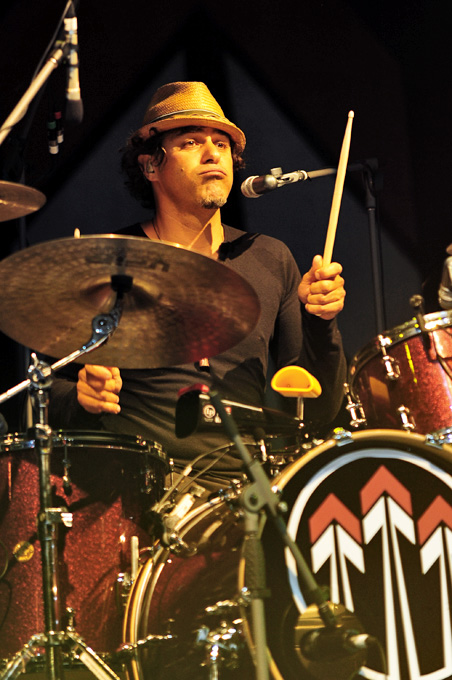
- Bomba, as a member of John Butler Trio, performing at the 2012 Southbound Festival

Background information
- Born: Nicholas Caruana; 7 September 1963 (age 63); Malta
- Origin: Melbourne, Victoria, Australia
- Genres: Reggae, funk, roots, jazz, ska, mento
- Instruments: Drums, percussion, guitar, vocals
- Years active: 1978–present
- Labels: Transmitter; FOUR FOUR
- Website: nickybomba.com

Nicholas Caruana (born 7 September 1963), also known as Nicky Bomba, is an Australian musician and singer-songwriter. He is the leader of the ARIA Award-winning Melbourne Ska Orchestra, frontman of his band, Bomba, as well as the former drummer and percussionist of John Butler Trio (2003–04, 2009–13). He has performed in other acts and as a solo artist. His youngest sister, Danielle Caruana, (who performs as Mama Kin), is married to his former bandmate, John Butler. His older brother, Michael Caruana, is a member of Bomba and of Mama Kin's backing band.

== Early life ==
Nicholas Caruana was born on 7 September 1963 in Malta, he later performed under the name Nicky Bomba. His father, Nicholas "Nicol" Caruana (born 4 June 1933) and mother, Iris (born 8 October 1934) had four children, Josephine, Michael, Carmen and Nicholas, in Malta. The family migrated to Australia in late 1964 and lived in the Melbourne suburb of Newport. They had two more children, including their youngest daughter, Danielle (who later performed as Mama Kin). Bomba started learning drums when he was six years old.

== Career ==
=== 1978-1997: Early years and The Truth ===
In 1978 Bomba formed a cover band with his brother, Michael, called Fugitive Flight. In 1982 they began playing original music with Peter Miller on lead vocals, Steve Morgan on bass guitar (later of Icehouse), and Peter Weeda on guitar. They soon changed their name to Guided Tour. After working in a variety of lesser known bands, Bomba formed The Truth in 1991 in Melbourne as a funk group. Initially Bomba was on drums with Michael on keyboards, Tony Kopa on lead vocals and Geoff Wells on guitars. Their debut single, "Secrets", was recorded in December 1992 and was followed by "My Heavy Friend" (1993). The Truth released a self-titled album in 1995, and in 1997 added a bass player, Mick Girasole, for the release of their second album, Headspace with the band re-branded as Truth. The Truth broke up in late 1997.

In September 1996 Bomba had supplied drums for The Ross Hannaford Trio, with Hannaford on lead vocals and guitar and Howard Cairns on bass guitar. The trio issued a self-titled album on Mushroom Records

=== 1998-2004: formation of Banana Oil and Melbourne Ska Orchestra ===
In 1998, Bomba formed a jazz band called Banana Oil, with Andy Baylor on guitar, Tim Neal on keyboards and David Williamson on saxophone. They released an album, Guavo Lampo. At the APRA Music Awards of 1998 Banana Oil members, Bomba (as Nicholas Caruana), Chris Tabone and Trevor Wraight, won Most Performed Jazz Work for their composition, "My Family". The group were also nominated in the same category for "Baylorology" by Baylor and "Neal Shuffle" by Neal.

In 1999 Bomba formed the band Bomba as a reggae-funk group with himself on guitar, percussion and lead vocals; Simon Bourke on keyboards; Phil Bywater on alto and tenor saxophones and clarinet; Paul Coyle on trumpet and trombone; Barry Deenick on bass guitar and vocals; George Servanis on drums, percussion and vocals; and Mal Webb on trombone and vocals. In 2003 his brother, Michael, replaced Bourke on keyboards. By 2006 the group had released four albums, Population (April 2000), Solar Plexus (February 2002), Learn to Breathe (March 2005) and Bomba Vs. Laroz (September 2006).

In March 2003 Bomba founded the Melbourne Ska Orchestra with an ensemble of between 27 and 32 musicians. His "idea was to get as many horn players as possible on stage at the same time playing ska skank, the accented upbeat that is typical of ska, the genre that originated in Jamaica in the late 1950s." In November that year Bomba joined John Butler (his brother-in-law), together with Shannon Birchall on upright bass, as part of the John Butler Trio to record that group's third studio album, Sunrise Over Sea. In March 2004, after the release of the album, he resumed his association with Bomba and with Melbourne Ska Orchestra.

=== 2005-present: Solo work and Bustamento ===
In 2005 Bomba and Joe Camilleri released Limestone, an album of covers and original music. In 2007 he recorded an album of Maltese songs, Nicol Caruana, with his father, Nicol. This was followed in 2008 with Jah in the Moment, which he then toured with a trio around Australia. In 2009 he released, Planet Juice, his first solo album, on which he played drums, guitar, ukulele and marimba.

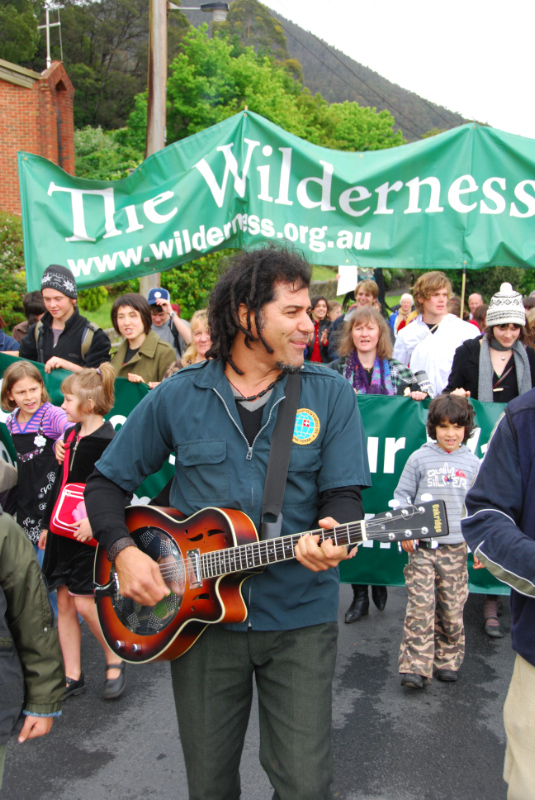
Nicky Bomba at a rally in Warburton, Victoria, 2008

By July 2009 he had re-joined John Butler Trio, now with Byron Luiters on bass guitar alongside Butler. They recorded the group's fifth studio album, April Uprising (March 2010). Bomba and Butler co-wrote the track, "Take Me". The trio's sixth album, Flesh & Blood, was released in February 2014. On 31 August 2013, Butler announced that Bomba had left John Butler Trio. Bomba appears on ten of its eleven tracks and co-wrote material with Butler and Luiters.

During 2012 Bomba focussed on a side-project, Bustamento, to perform mento music with a line-up of Bomba band members, Michael, Coyle, Deenick and Servanis, and new collaborators, Lennox Jordan on steelpans and Peter Mitchell on saxophone. They recorded Intrepid Adventures to the Lost Riddim Islands over a week-end and released it on 14 May 2012; they followed with a tour in June and July.

Bustamento issued their second album, Intercontinental Journey 7, on 28 November 2014. Lukas Murphy of Issuu magazine felt the album was "to be taken with a healthy dose of carefreeness" as exemplified by lyrics where "nonsense is rarely utilised in such a juxtapositional way, matched with both expertise and musical frivolity." From September 2014 Bomba worked with Melbourne Ska Orchestra to provide a musical accompaniment to the fireworks display for Melbourne's New Year's Eve celebrations.

In October 2021, Bomba released Food and Shelter. All the songs on the album relate to the theme of food and shelter.

== Personal life ==
Bomba's sister, Danielle Caruana, performs as Mama Kin, and is married to John Butler. His brother Michael Caruana also plays in Mama Kin and Bomba.

== Discography ==
=== Albums ===
Title	Details
Limestone (with Joe Camilleri)	Released: 2005; Label: Transmitter (TRFIG-LIME124); Format: CD
Drums and Lions (with Dereb Desalegn)	Released: 2005; Label: Transmitter (TRDER7002); Format: CD
Jah In the Moment	Released: July 2008; Label: Transmitter (TRNB777); Format: CD, digital
Planet Juice	Released: May 2009; Label: Bomba Music / Mushroom; Format: CD, digital
Intrepid Adventures to the Lost Riddim Islands (as Nicky Bomba's Bustamento)	Released: May 2012; Label: Vitamin (TRNB779); Format: CD, digital, LP
Intercontinental Journal 7 (as Bustamento)	Released: November 2014; Label: Four/ ABC; Format: CD, digital
Food and Shelter	Released: October 2021; Label: Four Four Music (FOUR0001); Format: CD, digital

== Awards and nominations ==
=== ARIA Music Awards ===
The ARIA Music Awards is an annual awards ceremony that recognises excellence, innovation, and achievement across all genres of Australian music. They commenced in 1987.

Year	Nominee / work	Award	Result	Ref.
2012	Intrepid Adventures to the Lost Riddim Island	Best World Music Album	Nominated	

=== Music Victoria Awards ===
The Music Victoria Awards are an annual awards night celebrating Victorian music. They commenced in 2006.

Year	Nominee / work	Award	Result	Ref.
2022	Nicky Bomba	Best Reggae and Dancehall Work	Nominated	
