= Bomba (band) =

Australian funk and reggae band

- Origin: Melbourne, Australia
- Genres: Reggae, Funk
- Years active: 1999–present
- Labels: Transmitter
- Members: Nicky Bomba; Paul Coyle; Dorian West; Pete Mitchell; George Servanis; Michael Caruana

Bomba are an Australian funk and reggae band from Melbourne. Led by Maltese-Australian Nicky Bomba, they are known for their "energetic live shows and passionate performances". They have released four albums, the latest of which is Bomba Vs. Laroz (2006).

== History ==
Bomba grew out of the band the Overtones, which formed in 1997. The band's original lineup comprised Nicky Bomba on guitar, percussion and vocals; Simon Burke on keyboards; Paul Coyle on trumpet, flugelhorn, percussion and vocals; Barry Deenick on bass guitar and vocals; Mal Webb on trombone and vocals; Phil Bywater on alto and tenor saxophones and clarinet; and George Servanis on drums, percussion and vocals.

In 2000, Bomba released the album Population. Australian music journalist, Ed Nimmervoll described the album as "delightfully eclectic, bridging the previously unrelated gap between reggae and big band music". Their second album, Solar Plexus, was released by Transmitter Records in 2002.

By about 2003, the band's lineup comprised Nicky Bomba on guitar, theremin, percussion and vocals; his brother Michael Caruana on keyboards, percussion and vocals; Paul Coyle on trumpet, trombone, flugelhorn, percussion and vocals; Dorian West on bass guitar, trumpet, flugelhorn, guitar, theremin, percussion and vocals; Pete Mitchell on tenor and baritone saxophone, guitar, percussion and vocals; and George Servanis on drums, percussion and vocals.

In 2005, Bomba released their third album, Learn to Breathe.

== The band ==
The current Bomba lineup comprises six members:

- Nicky Bomba: guitar, theremin, percussion, vocals
- Paul Coyle: trumpet, trombone, flugelhorn, percussion, vocals
- Dorian West: bass, trumpet, flugelhorn, guitar, theremin, percussion, vocals
- Pete Mitchell: tenor, baritone saxophone, guitar, percussion, vocals
- George Servanis: drums, percussion, vocals
- Michael Caruana: keyboards, percussion, vocals

== Discography ==
=== Albums ===
Title	Details
Population	Released: 9 April 2000; Label: Mushroom Music (BOMB04); Format: CD
Solar Plexus	Released: 1 February 2002; Label: Transmitter Records (TRFIG123); Format: CD
Learn to Breathe	Released: 21 March 2005; Label: Transmitter Records (TRCAQ777); Format: CD
Bomba Vs. Laroz	Released: 4 September 2006; Label: Transmitter Records (TRLAR7001); Format: CD, DD
