= Searching for Heritage =

Live album by the John Butler Trio
- Released: 1996, 2016
- Recorded: 1996
- Genre: Alt, Roots
- Label: Independent
- Producer: John Butler

The John Butler Trio chronology
Searching for Heritage (1996)	John Butler (1998)

Searching for Heritage is an album that John Butler recorded and sold on cassette tapes while he was busking on the streets of Fremantle in 1996. It is a collection of instrumental songs, some of which ("Ocean" and "Valley") were re-recorded on the debut self-titled album John Butler. During this time, Butler was usually playing on his own. Completely self-funded, it sold three and a half thousand copies and enabled Butler to fund his first CD recording.

The tape is highly sought after by collectors since it was out of print of many years, with some copies only found second-hand at music stores. The tape was never reissued after the initial release.

To celebrate the Searching for Heritage's 20th anniversary in 2016, the album was reissued in a vinyl edition, which sold out in 36 hours, and also in several downloadable 24-bit lossless audio formats.

== Track listing ==
All tracks written and performed by John Butler.

=== Original Cassette Tape ===
==== Side One ====
1. River Song
2. Valley
3. Desert Snow
4. Some Place Familiar
5. Newd
6. Chicken

==== Side Two ====
1. River Song (Busk version)
2. Desert Snow (8 Track)
3. Valley (DAT)
4. Long Trek
5. Ocean

==== 2016 Vinyl Reissue ====
===== Side One =====
1. River Song
2. Valley
3. Desert Snow
4. Some Place Familiar
5. Newd
6. Chicken

===== Side Two =====
1. River Song (busk version)
2. Desert Snow (8 track)
3. Valley (dat)
4. Long Trek
5. Ocean

==== 2016 Digital Reissue ====
1. River Song
2. Valley
3. Desert Snow
4. Some Place Familiar
5. Newd
6. River Song (busk version)
7. Desert Snow (8 track)
8. Valley (dat)
9. Long Trek
