= Shannon Birchall =

Australian born musician, probably

- Performing with the John Butler Trio at Wollongong Botanical Gardens, 2008

Background information
- Genres: Roots, funk, orchestral
- Occupation(s): Musician, composer
- Instrument(s): Double bass, electric bass, violin, mandolin, harmonica
- Years active: 1997–present
- Labels: Jarrah Records

Shannon Birchall is an Australian born musician, probably best known as the bassist for jam band the John Butler Trio. Birchall is often labeled a virtuoso by different music experts. He is also known for composing and conducting the string sections of the John Butler Trio's work.

== Biography ==
Birchall switched to double bass at the age of 15 after initially studying classical violin. He is a Victorian College of the Arts graduate and has played with the Tasmanian, Adelaide and Melbourne Symphony Orchestras. He has also toured overseas with The Hoodangers, an energetic cross between the Sex Pistols and Jelly Roll Morton. In 1997 they visited Europe, Russia and the former Soviet republics. They also toured North America. In 2000, Birchall returned to Europe, performing in the Netherlands and Denmark with The Band Who Knew Too Much.

Since then, Birchall has played in a variety of bands - remaining loyal to John Butler Trio, but also playing with many other jam and blues bands. Shannon played on You Am I's 2002 release "Deliverance". Deborah Conway and Willie Zygier enlisted him to arrange and record on their 2004 album "Summertown". On 16 May 2007, Birchall was spotted on Australian music quiz show, Spicks and Specks, playing with The Band Who Knew Too Much.

On 23 March 2009, the John Butler Trio website reported that Shannon as well as JBT drummer Michael Barker would be playing their last shows with the John Butler Trio in April. According to the website, this is an artistic decision made by John himself. To quote John, "Michael and Shannon have been by far the best line up I have performed with in The John Butler Trio to date. They have been a pleasure to live, love, learn, record and tour with. Their professionalism, musicianship, and commitment have been unwavering and for that and a whole lot more I am truly thankful."

In the fall of 2009, Birchall debuted with the Spaghetti Western Orchestra, a highly theatrical and musical interpretation of the western cinematic works of Ennio Morricone. A 2010/11 tour culminated in a live BBC Radio and TV performance at the Royal Albert Hall in the 2011 season of the BBC Proms on 14 August.

The Albert Hall performance attracted more attention to the group and the 2011 tour was followed up with a UK and European tour in 2012.

== Partial discography ==
=== With The Hoodangers ===
- Dang On (1997)
- Astro-Naughties (1998)

=== With The Band Who Knew Too Much ===
- The Band Who Knew Too Much (1996)
- Never Heard Of 'Em (1999)
- Come on Let's Go (2003)
- Eat Sleep Work (2007)

=== With Doug deVries ===
- A Knot in the Wood (2002)

=== With Estuary Three ===
- "Thumbnails" (2002)"

=== With Deborah Conway ===
- Summertown (2004)

=== With You Am I ===
- Deliverance (2002)

=== With Neil Murray ===
- Overnighter (2007)

=== With Daquqi ===
- The Lift Equation (2010)

=== With Jeremy Woolhouse ===
- "The Scenery of Life Unfolding" (2013)

=== With The John Butler Trio ===
==== Albums ====
- Sunrise Over Sea (2003)
- Grand National (2007)

==== Singles ====
- "Zebra" (2003)
- "What You Want" (2004)
- "Somethings Gotta Give" (2004)
- "Funky Tonight" (2006)
- "Good Excuse" (2007)
- "Better Than" (2007)
