= April Uprising (album) =

Studio album by John Butler Trio
- Released: 26 March 2010
- Recorded: 2009–2010
- Genre: Roots
- Length: 60:00
- Producer: John Butler

John Butler Trio chronology
Grand National (2007)	April Uprising (2010)	Flesh & Blood (2014)

Singles from April Uprising
- 1. "One Way Road" Released: 4 December 2009; 2. "Close To You" Released: 11 March 2010; 3. "Revolution" Released: 2 June 2010; 4. "Don't Wanna See Your Face" Released: 5 October 2010

April Uprising is the fifth studio album by Australian roots band the John Butler Trio. The album was recorded from late 2009-early 2010 in Fremantle, Australia. The album's name comes from Butler's appearance on the television documentary series, Who Do You Think You Are, where he journeyed to Bulgaria to find information about his ancestors. The 1876 April Uprising was an important event in Bulgarian history.

The first single from the album was "One Way Road", which was accompanied by a music video, and was released on 4 December 2009. The second single was "Close To You", also with a video, on 11 March 2010.

== History ==
Professional ratings
Review scores
Source	Rating
Allmusic	3/5 stars
And Pluck Your Strings	positive

The album was recorded in Fremantle, Australia, with the band's new line-up, consisting of drummer and Butler's brother-in-law Nicky Bomba and bassist Byron Luiters. Bomba has been in the band's line-up before, and was the band's drummer for the album Sunrise Over Sea.

The band recorded 22 tracks at Fremantle, then cut them down to 15 as the track list for the album. The first single, "One Way Road", was released on 4 December 2009, accompanied by a music video which received a fair amount of airplay. The single also featured two b-sides, a track called "I'm Ready" and a demo of a song called "Johnny's Gone", which is featured on the album.

The album was put up on the iTunes Store in two forms, a normal version featuring the average edition of the album, and a deluxe version with three bonus tracks ("Gone", "Only You", "Satisfy") and the video of "One Way Road".

The second single was announced as "Close To You" on 11 March. It was accompanied by a music video, and on 26 March, a "making-of" video in a blog on the band's MySpace. Four songs from the album, "Revolution" and "Don't Wanna See Your Face", as well as "One Way Road" and "Close To You", the album's singles, are available for listening on the band's MySpace.

On Thursday 15 April 2010, "April Uprising" debuted at No.36 on the American Billboard Albums Chart. This is the John Butler Trio's first Top 100 selling album in America.

== Track listing ==
1. "Revolution" – 5:03
2. "One Way Road" – 3:06
3. "C'mon Now" – 2:42
4. "I'd Do Anything (Soldier's Lament)" – 3:21
5. "Ragged Mile (Spirit Song)" – 3:57
6. "Johnny's Gone" – 4:55
7. "Close to You" – 3:45
8. "Don't Wanna See Your Face" – 2:43
9. "Take Me" – 5:01
10. "Fool for You" – 5:07
11. "To Look Like You" – 4:19
12. "Steal It" – 3:43
13. "Mystery Man" – 3:55
14. "Gonna Be a Long Time" – 3:46
15. "A Star Is Born" – 4:35
16. "Gone (French bonus)" – 5:00
17. "Only you (French bonus)" – 3:33

== Charts ==
=== Weekly charts ===
Chart (2010)	Peak position
Australian Albums (ARIA)	1

=== Year-end charts ===
Chart (2010)	Peak position
Australian (ARIA Charts)	20

== Certifications ==
Region	Certification	Certified units/sales
Australia (ARIA)	Platinum	70,000^{^}
^{^} Shipments figures based on certification alone.
