= John Butler Trio =

Australian rock band

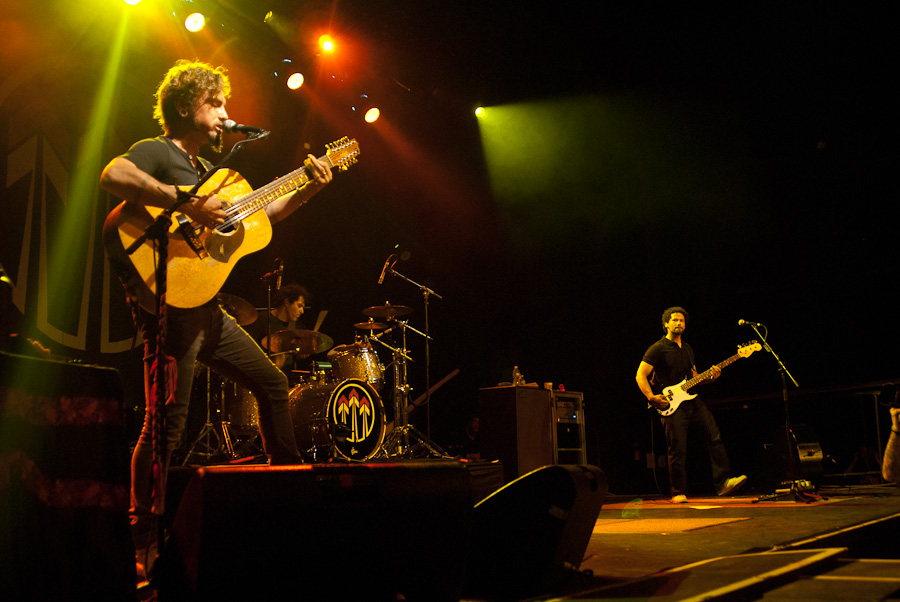
- The John Butler Trio (left to right: John Butler on guitar, Nicky Bomba on drums, Byron Luiters on bass) performing in Toronto c. 2012

Background information
- Origin: Fremantle, Western Australia
- Genres: Alternative rock, bluegrass, blues rock, funk rock, reggae, roots rock
- Years active: 1998–2019, 2026–present
- Labels: Jarrah, ATO, MapleMusic Recordings (Canada)
- Members: John Butler; Ian Peres; Jackie Barnes
- Past members: OJ Newcombe; Terepai Richmond; Byron Luiters; Grant Gerathy; Nicky Bomba; Shannon Birchall; Michael Barker; Gavin Shoesmith; Rory Quirk; Jason McGann; Andrew Fry
- Website: www.johnbutlertrio.com

The John Butler Trio are an Australian roots rock band led by guitarist and vocalist John Butler. They formed in Fremantle in 1998 with Jason McGann on drums, Gavin Shoesmith on bass and Butler on vocals. By 2009, the trio consisted of Butler with Byron Luiters on bass and Nicky Bomba on drums and percussion, the latter being replaced by Grant Gerathy in 2013. After both Luiters and Gerathy exited the trio in early 2019, bassist OJ Newcomb and drummer Terepai Richmond (also of the Whitlams) joined the band, accompanied by touring musician Elana Stone on keyboards, percussion and backing vocals.

The band's second studio album, Three (2001), reached the top 30 in the Australian album charts and achieved platinum sales. The band's subsequent studio albums, Sunrise Over Sea (2004), Grand National (2007) and April Uprising (2010), all debuted at the number one position on the Australian album charts, with all three albums reaching platinum sales status. Living 2001–2002 (2003), the band's first live album, reached the top ten and also achieved platinum status in Australia. The band's second live album, Live at St. Gallen (2005), also achieved gold record status. The band's releases since 2002 have been marketed independently by Jarrah Records, which Butler co-owns with West Australian folk band the Waifs and manager of both acts, Philip Stevens. Their final studio album, Home, was released in 2018 before Butler discontinued the project a year later. In 2026, Butler revived the Trio with a new line-up consisting of bassist/keyboardist Ian Peres and drummer Jackie Barnes.

== History ==
=== Early career ===
The John Butler Trio was founded by the titular John Butler, who started his career as a busker in Fremantle, Western Australia and released a self-recorded cassette, Searching for Heritage in 1996. He began performing with Gavin Shoesmith on double bass and bass guitar, who had founded the band Katamaran in Darwin before relocating to Fremantle. With Butler, Shoesmith and Jason McGann on drums, John Butler Trio was formed in 1998 and independently released the John Butler album in December. It was produced by Butler and included re-recorded versions of two tracks from his Searching for Heritage.

The John Butler Trio released a four-track extended play, JBT, in April 2000. It was produced by Butler and Shaun O'Callaghan. Radio station Triple J chose the track "Pickapart" to put on high rotation. The band began to develop a wider reputation with a performance at the East Coast Blues & Roots Music Festival in Byron Bay in 2000. Butler recalled that his first gig had about 50 people, the second gig started the same way when "it absolutely pissed with rain and 3000 people ran into our tent. And the show just went berserk. It was like a suffocated fire – you lift the lid and it explodes". The John Butler Trio went on to become regular performers at the annual event.

=== Three ===
In April 2001, the John Butler Trio released Three and relocated to Melbourne to promote the record on the east coast. The track "Betterman" was placed on high rotation by Triple J. Three peaked at No. 24 on the ARIA Charts. It also remained on the alternative charts for nine months reaching No. 3. At the ARIA Music Awards of 2001 the album won an award for 'Best Independent Release'. "Betterman" reached No. 5 on the Triple J Hottest 100, 2001.

Shoesmith left the trio to form his own band, the Groovesmiths. Butler replaced him with 19-year-old Rory Quirk, who was on their first tour of the United States in 2001. Quirk, in turn, left in 2002 to pursue a career with his band Quirk. Andrew Fry joined as the next bass player.

The success of Three led to its release in the US in 2002 and two tours of the US followed. The band supported the Dave Matthews Band and John Mayer as well as playing at the Bonnaroo Music Festival and the South by Southwest Festival. The band also played at the Splendour in the Grass festival in Australia. Butler, his manager Phil Stevens and fellow Western Australian folk artists the Waifs, founded Jarrah Records in July 2002.

As a result of intensive touring, the band developed a strong live reputation in Australia. The band released Living 2001-2002 in February 2003, a double live album which had a top ten debut in the ARIA album charts and went on to achieve platinum sales. Butler took a brief break after five years of solid work since 1997 for the birth of his daughter Banjo.

=== Sunrise Over Sea ===
In late 2003, John Butler entered Woodstock Studios in Melbourne owned by Joe Camilleri, the leader of Jo Jo Zep and the Black Sorrows. He had a new band consisting of percussionist Nicky Bomba and upright-bass player Shannon Birchall. After recording the album, Bomba returned to his own reggae band and was replaced by drummer/percussionist Michael Barker.

John Butler told Rolling Stone that he wanted greater freedom to pursue his vision. "Essentially what I learnt out of this process was, more so than ever, I'm the keeper of the music. I have the intuition and the foresight to pick the right players to my music. I've learned it's not always about having the same players for five, six or 10 years, it's having the right chemistry for these songs at this time. Some of my favourite Jimi Hendrix music is off-the-cuff stuff with Band of Gypsies."

The title Sunrise Over Sea is taken from the lyrics to the second track, Peaches and Cream. The album debuted at number one in the national album charts on 15 March 2004 and achieved gold record status in its first week of release.

The Zebra EP was released in December 2003 and made the ARIA singles charts in early 2004. The song was voted No. 7 in the Triple J Hottest 100, 2004 and also was the first John Butler Trio single to gain significant airplay on commercial FM radio across Australia, although it was still quite popular on Triple J. John Butler would win an Australasian Performing Right Association award for Song of the Year in March 2004. On 20 October 2006, the track also appeared as the opening music for the episode 'Traffic' (Season 3, Episode 5) of the popular US Crime drama Numb3rs.

In 2005 John Butler and co-founder Danielle Caruana (his wife) inaugurated the JB Seed grant program. "The Seed aims to help Australian artists from any background, creating art and music across any genre, to establish themselves as self-sustained, professional artists." Caruana also plays independent music, she plays under the name Mama Kin.

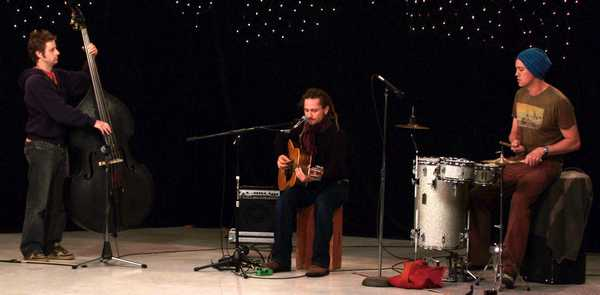
John Butler Trio in 2006.

Following the Boxing Day Tsunami, the John Butler Trio appeared at the Wave Aid fundraising concert in Sydney, to raise funds for aid organisations working in disaster affected areas.

The John Butler Trio played at all venues for the Big Day Out music festival, starting in Auckland, New Zealand on 19 January 2007, and finishing in Perth Western Australia on 4 February.

=== Grand National ===
Their fourth studio album, entitled Grand National, was released on 24 March 2007 in Australia and New Zealand, and released on 27 March 2007 in the United States and France. The first single off the album, titled "Funky Tonight", reached a high of No. 15 on the ARIA charts and No. 12 on Triple J Hottest 100 for 2006. A second single, "Better Than," was also released. In conjunction with the American release, the trio scheduled a small American Tour consisting of five cities starting in Los Angeles and ending in New York.

In April 2007 Grand National was the initial album nominated for a J Award by national youth broadcaster Triple J. "Better Than" which was released as the first overseas single from Grand National, reached No. 1 on the Triple A format charts in United States in June 2007. It also reached the top ten international songs at Japanese Radio and has been a major radio hit in France where the video made MTV's video of the week.

On 7 July 2007 they performed at the Australian leg of Live Earth in Sydney. On 31 July 2007 the John Butler Trio performed their song, "Better Than" on The Tonight Show with Jay Leno. On 4 August 2007 they performed at Newport Folk Festival playing a set that included "Used to Get High", "Better Than", "Ocean", "Funky Tonight", and "Good Excuse".

In 2007, the John Butler Trio won the Australian Independent Record (AIR) Award for Best Performing Independent Album as well as Best Independent Release and Best Blues and Roots Album at the ARIA Awards.

On 3 August 2008 they performed at Lollapalooza in Chicago. The John Butler Trio concluded the summer of 2008 touring the U.S. with G. Love and Special Sauce.

In July 2009 "Betterman" was voted number 47 by the Australian public in Triple J Hottest 100 of all time.

On 26 March 2009 John Butler announced that the current bass and drum musicians of the John Butler Trio, Shannon Birchall and Michael Barker are separating from the band. For purely artistic reasons, John feels that it is necessary to change the line up in an attempt by John to discover new inspirations with new members. John stated in his announcement;

Michael and Shannon have been by far the best line up I have performed with in The John Butler Trio to date. They have been a pleasure to live, love, learn, record and tour with. Their professionalism, musicianship, and commitment have been unwavering and for that and a whole lot more I am truly thankful.

— John Butler, 2009

Michael Barker went on to form Swamp Thing with guitarist/singer Grant Haua, based in New Zealand. Their first album Balladeer was released in May 2011.

=== April Uprising ===
On 30 June 2009 John Butler announced the new bass and drum musicians of the John Butler Trio to be Byron Luiters as the bassist and Nicky Bomba as the drummer and percussionist. Bomba, Butler's brother-in-law, had previously been a member of the John Butler Trio.

The new line-up has spent the last few months in a studio in Fremantle, recording the band's fifth studio album, which was released 26 March 2010. The album will be called April Uprising, named after Butler's voyage to find his ancestors on SBS Television's genealogy series, Who Do You Think You Are?. The recording process for the new album has been shared with fans via a special studio sessions page on the band's website. The first single from the album, "One Way Road", was released on 4 December 2009. Butler described the song as being

the combination of pretty much most of my musical influences; dancehall, roots & rock. Some how we found a way to bring all these feels in a way that sounds natural and not too contrived or cerebral. I'm really happy with how we captured the vibe of this song.

The band, according to billboard.com, recorded twenty two songs at Butler's home based studio in Fremantle, this was eventually cut down to the fifteen that appear on the album. The album was released in Australia, Germany, Belgium, Switzerland and The Netherlands on 26 March 2010, in New Zealand and France on 29 March, in the UK on 5 April, and in the USA / Canada on 6 April.

April Uprising debuted at No. 1 on the Australian ARIA albums chart on 5 April and whilst the first two singles from the album, "One Way Road" and "Close to You", charted at No. 15 and No. 36 on the Australian ARIA singles charts they both reached the top five in the Spins radio airplay charts, the former reaching No. 1.

On 4 June 2010 John Butler Trio played a show at Red Rocks Amphitheatre, which was streamed live to fans around the world at Livestream.

In 2010, the John Butler Trio received the award for Most Popular Independent Artist at the Australian Independent Record (AIR) Awards while April Uprising was nominated at the ARIA Awards for 'Best Blues and Roots Album' and 'Best Independent Release'.

In February 2012, John Butler recorded a studio version of the Trio's instrumental single "Ocean", at The Compound in Fremantle, and uploaded it to the band's YouTube channel later in that year. The 12-minute video clip went viral, and has accumulated over 35 million views online.

On 31 August 2013, it was announced by John Butler that Nicky Bomba (drums and percussion) will be leaving the band. Subsequently, on 8 October, Butler announced that Grant Gerathy of Ray Mann Three will be the new drummer for the Trio.

=== Flesh & Blood ===
Flesh & Blood, produced by Jan Skubiszewski, was released on 7 February 2014, with the initial single "Only One" released on 15 November 2013. While the single ranked 87th in the Triple J Hottest 100, 2013, the album itself received the 2014 ARIA Award for Best Blues and Roots Album, debuted at No. 2 on the Australian charts, and reached No. 7 in the Hungarian charts. The trio also undertook a large national tour in February and March 2014 to support the release of the new album.

Singles from Flesh & Blood were performed by the Trio on the American late-night talk show Conan on 24 February 2014, and for Triple J's Like a Version on 11 April 2014. Their roots rock cover of Pharrell Williams' "Happy" features on the CD and DVD releases of Like a Version's Volume Ten.

=== Home, split and reunion ===
In August 2018, the band released the title track to their seventh studio album Home; it was later released on 28 September that same year.

On March 11, 2019, John Butler Trio announced that Byron Luiters and Grant Gerathy would be leaving the band.

In April 2024, with the release of his solo album Running River, Butler confirmed that the John Butler Trio had dissipated following the conclusion of the Home tour in late 2019. Butler continued to pursue his solo career, releasing the album Prism in September 2025.

In September 2026, Butler played two surprise sets with the John Butler Trio as part of Bigsound in Brisbane, marking the first shows under the moniker since 2019. The new line-up of the band consists of bassist/keyboardist Ian Peres – who has toured extensively with Butler as part of his solo backing band – as well as drummer Jackie Barnes. A remastered 25th anniversary edition of Three was released the following week.

== Political activism ==
The band performed at The Wilderness Society's Save the Kimberley concert on 5 October 2012, alongside Clare Bowditch and Missy Higgins. The concert was part of a long-running campaign to protest against a proposal to industrialise the James Price Point area in Broome, Western Australia, and also featured an address from former leader of the Australian Greens, Dr Bob Brown.

== Members ==
Current members

- John Butler – lead vocals, guitar, banjo (1998–2019, 2026–present)
- Ian Peres – bass, keyboards, backing vocals (2026–present)
- Jackie Barnes – drums, percussion, backing vocals (2026–present)

Former members

- Gavin Shoesmith – bass (1998–2001)
- Jason McGann – drums, percussion (1998–2003)
- Rory Quirk – bass (2001–2002)
- Andrew Fry – bass (2002–2003)
- Shannon Birchall – bass, backing vocals (2003–2009)
- Nicky Bomba – drums, percussion, backing vocals (2003–2004, 2009–2013)
- Michael Barker – drums, percussion, backing vocals (2004–2009)
- Byron Luiters – bass, backing vocals (2009–2019)
- Grant Gerathy – drums (2013–2019)
- Owen "OJ" Newcomb – bass, keyboards, backing vocals (2019)
- Terepai Richmond – drums, percussion, backing vocals (2019)

Former touring musicians

- Lozz Benson – percussion, backing vocals (2018–2019)
- Ben Corbett – keyboards, percussion, backing vocals (2018–2019)
- Elana Stone – keyboards, percussion, backing vocals (2019)

Timeline

== Discography ==
Studio albums

- John Butler (1998)
- Three (2001)
- Sunrise Over Sea (2004)
- Grand National (2007)
- April Uprising (2010)
- Flesh & Blood (2014)
- Home (2018)

Live albums

- Living 2001–2002 (2003)
- Live at St. Gallen (2005)
- One Small Step (2009)
- Live at Red Rocks (2011)
- Tin Shed Tales (2012)
- Live In Paris (2023)

== Awards and nominations ==
=== AIR Awards ===
The Australian Independent Record Awards (commonly known informally as AIR Awards) is an annual awards night to recognise, promote and celebrate the success of Australia's Independent Music sector.

Year	Nominee / work	Award	Result
2006	Live at St. Gallen	Best Performing Independent Album	Nominated
2006	themselves	Independent Artist of the Year	Nominated
2007	Grand National	Best Performing Independent Album	Won
2007	Grand National	Best Independent Blues and Roots Album	Nominated
2007	themselves	Independent Artist of the Year	Nominated
2007	"Funky Tonight"	Best Performing Independent Single/EP	Nominated
2010	themselves	Most Popular Independent Artist	Won
2014	Flesh & Blood	Best Independent Blues and Roots Album	Nominated
2014	themselves	Independent Artist of the Year	Nominated
2019	Home	Best Independent Blues and Roots Album	Nominated

=== APRA Awards ===
The APRA Awards are presented annually from 1982 by the Australasian Performing Right Association (APRA).

Year	Nominee / work	Award	Result
2004	"Zebra"	Song of the Year	Won
2006	"Somethings Gotta Give"	Most Performed Blues & Roots Work	Won
2006	"What You Want"	Most Performed Blues & Roots Work	Nominated
2008	"Better Than"	Song of the Year	Nominated
2008	"Funky Tonight"	Blues & Roots Work of the Year	Nominated
2008	"Good Excuse"	Blues & Roots Work of the Year	Won
2010	"One Way Road"	Song of the Year	Shortlisted
2011	"Revolution"	Song of the Year	Nominated
2011	"Close to You"	Blues & Roots Work of the Year	Won
2011	"Close to You"	Most Played Australian Work	Nominated
2011	"One Way Road"	Blues & Roots Work of the Year	Nominated
2011	"One Way Road"	Most Played Australian Work	Nominated
2014	"Only One"	Song of the Year	Shortlisted
2014	"Only One"	Blues & Roots Work of the Year	Won
2015	"Livin' in the City"	Blues & Roots Work of the Year	Nominated
2015	"Livin' in the City"	Song of the Year	Shortlisted
2019	"Home"	Song of the Year	Shortlisted
2020	"Just Call"	Most Performed Blues & Roots Work of the Year	Won

=== ARIA Awards ===
The ARIA Music Awards are presented annually from 1987 by the Australian Recording Industry Association (ARIA). The John Butler Trio have won six awards from twenty-eight nominations.

Year	Nominee / work	Award	Result
2001	Three	Best Blues & Roots Album	Nominated
2001	Three	Best Independent Release	Won
2001	Three	Breakthrough Artist – Album	Nominated
2001	John Butler Trio EP	Breakthrough Artist – Single	Nominated
2003	Living 2001-2002	Best Blues & Roots Album	Nominated
2003	Living 2001–2002	Best Independent Release	Nominated
2004	Sunrise Over Sea	Best Cover Art	Nominated
2004	Sunrise Over Sea	Engineer of the Year	Nominated
2004	Sunrise Over Sea	Producer of the Year	Nominated
2004	Sunrise Over Sea	Best Blues & Roots Album	Won
2004	Sunrise Over Sea	Best Independent Release	Won
2004	"Zebra"	Single of the Year	Nominated
2004	Sunrise Over Sea	Album of the Year	Nominated
2005	"Somethings Gotta Give" (Ben Joss and Tribal)	Best Video	Nominated
2006	Live at St. Gallen	Best Independent Release	Nominated
2007	Grand National	Best Independent Release	Won
2007	Grand National	Best Blues & Roots Album	Won
2007	"Funky Tonight"	Single of the Year	Nominated
2007	Grand National	Album of the Year	Nominated
2008	Live at Federation Square	Best Music DVD	Nominated
2010	April Uprising	Best Independent Release	Nominated
2010	April Uprising	Best Blues & Roots Album	Nominated
2011	Live at Red Rocks	Best Independent Release	Nominated
2011	Live at Red Rocks	Best Blues & Roots Album	Nominated
2014	Flesh & Blood	Best Blues & Roots Album	Won
2014	Flesh & Blood Tour	Best Australian Live Act	Nominated
2014	"Only One" – Ben Young	Best Video	Nominated
2019	Home	Best Blues & Roots Album	Nominated

=== J Awards ===
The J Awards are presented annually from 2005 by the Australian national youth radio broadcasting station, Triple J.

Year	Nominee / work	Award	Result
2007	Grand National	Album	Nominated
2018	himself	Double J Artist of the Year	Nominated

=== National Live Music Awards ===
The National Live Music Awards (NLMAs) are a broad recognition of Australia's diverse live industry, celebrating the success of the Australian live scene. The awards commenced in 2016.

Year	Nominee / work	Award	Result
2018	John Butler Trio	Live Blues and Roots Act of the Year	Nominated

=== Western Australian Music Industry Awards ===
The Western Australian Music Industry Awards (commonly known as WAMis) are annual awards presented to the local contemporary music industry, put on by the Western Australian Music Industry Association Inc (WAM). John Butler /John Butler Trio has won five awards.

Year	Nominee / work	Award	Result (wins only)
2002	John Butler Trio	Most Popular Local Original Folk Act	Won
2002	John Butler	Most Popular Male Original Vocalist	Won
2002	John Butler	Most Popular Male Original Guitarist	Won
2003	John Butler Trio	Most Popular Local Original Blues & Roots Act	Won
2014	"Only One" by John Butler Trio	Most Popular Video	Won
