= John Butler (musician) =

Australian musician, songwriter, record label owner and producer

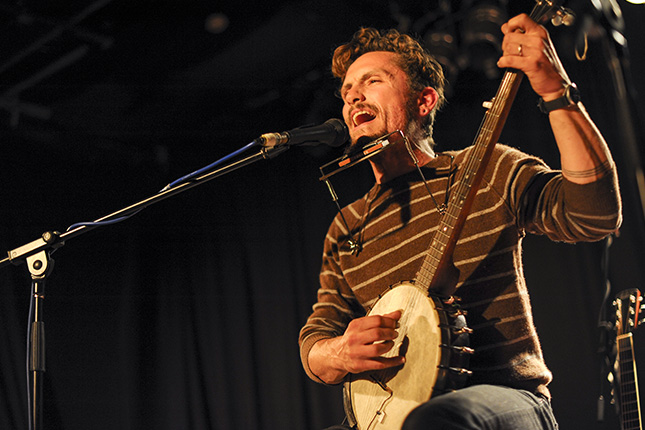
- Butler performing in Perth, 2012

Background information
- Born: John Charles Wiltshire-Butler; 1 April 1975 (age 51); Torrance, California, U.S.
- Origin: Pinjarra, Western Australia, Australia
- Genres: Blues rock; alternative rock; jam rock; Celtic rock; roots rock; funk rock
- Occupations: Musician; singer; songwriter; record label owner; producer
- Instruments: Vocals; guitar; banjo; ukulele; drums; harmonica; didgeridoo; stomp box
- Years active: 1996–present
- Labels: Waterfront; Jarrah
- Formerly of: John Butler Trio

John Charles Wiltshire-Butler (born 1 April 1975), professionally known as John Butler, is an Australian singer, songwriter and music producer. He is best known for his time as the eponymous frontman of the John Butler Trio, a roots rock and jam rock band that formed in Fremantle, Western Australia, in 1998.

The John Butler Trio recorded five studio albums, including three that reached number one on the Australian charts: Sunrise Over Sea, Grand National and April Uprising. His recordings and live performances have met with critical praise and received awards from the Australian Performing Right Association and the Australian Recording Industry Association.

Butler was born in the United States and moved to Australia at an early age. He began playing the guitar at the age of 16. In 2002, along with several partners, formed the Jarrah record label. He is also the co-founder of The JB Seed, a grant programme that seeks to improve artistic diversity in Australia.

== Early life and education ==
John Charles Wiltshire-Butler was born on 1 April 1975 to an Australian father, Darryl Wiltshire-Butler, and an American mother, Barbara (née Butler).^{[A]} He was named after his paternal grandfather, John Francis Wiltshire-Butler, a forestry worker who died fighting a bushfire in Nannup. Butler has British, Bulgarian and Greek ancestry through his father. His genealogy was investigated on an episode of the SBS Television series Who Do You Think You Are?, which aired on 1 November 2009. The show traced his family history from his deceased grandfather's war diaries through to ancestors in Bulgaria and the events of the 1876 April Uprising.

In January 1986, after his parents divorced, Butler's father moved the family to Western Australia. They eventually settled in Pinjarra, a small country town, and Butler attended Pinjarra Primary School and Pinjarra Senior High School. He began playing guitar at the age of sixteen after his grandmother gave him a 1930s dobro belonging to his deceased grandfather. In 1996, he attended Curtin University in Perth and enrolled in an art teaching course, but eventually abandoned his studies to pursue a career in music. Some of his first musical performances were as a busker at the Fremantle Markets. Butler was also participant in the Western Australian skateboarding scene, and is recognised for his involvement with the internationally renowned "Woolstores" street spot in Fremantle.

== Career ==
=== Vitamin ===
Butler travelled to Encinitas, California, after high school, where he spent two years with his brother Jim and began his music career in a band called Vitamin. His first gig was on 9 September 1994 at the Metaphor Cafe in Escondido, California. Vitamin were written up and reviewed in Go magazine, performed around the San Diego area and played one show in Houston, Texas, opening for Dive (which later became Osmant in 1995). Vitamin recorded two tracks, "Deadhorse" and "Mary Jane", at the Belly Up Studios in Solana Beach, California, in 1994. Vitamin bandmate Ozzie Rea fronted a Perth funk band, Proton. The two can be found on The Live at Mojo's CD and performed together on New Years Ever Y2K. The members of Vitamin were John Butler (12-string guitar, vocals); Ozzie Rea (vocals); Justin Bancroft (electric guitar); Taria Flower Star (bass); Duck Grossberg (bass); Desiree (congas); Gabe (Djembe); Jim (Harmonica); and Hailey Odom (harmonica). Butler was a busker on the streets of Fremantle playing his own compositions. In mid-1996, he released a self-recorded cassette of his instrumentals, Searching for Heritage, which sold 3,000 copies. He played different styles of music including "Indian, Celtic, bluegrass and folk". Butler had his first paid performance in 1997 at the Seaview Hotel in Fremantle. In 1998, North Fremantle Mojo's club owner Phil Stevens hired Butler as a regular performer. Stevens became his manager and later his business partner.

=== John Butler Trio ===
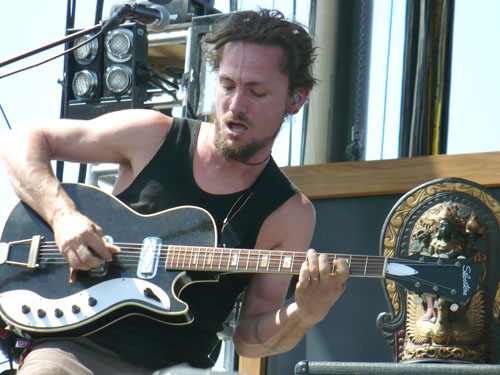
Butler on electric guitar, 2009

==== John Butler ====
Butler was joined by drummer Jason McGann (Mojos sound engineer) and bass player Gavin Shoesmith to form the John Butler Trio and recorded the John Butler album which was released on Waterfront Records in December 1998. At various times the members of the John Butler Trio included drummers Michael Barker (2003–2009) and Nicky Bomba, bass players Rory Quirk (2001–2002), Andrew Fry (April 2002 – November 2002), Shannon Birchall (2002–2009) and Byron Luiters. The band's musical style was influenced by Black Sabbath, Fleetwood Mac and Jeff Lang. The band toured throughout Western Australia in 1999.

==== Three ====
The band's second album, Three, was produced by Butler and Shaun O'Callaghan. It was released and distributed on Waterfront Records in April 2001. It featured the tracks "Take" and "Betterman", which both received radio airplay on the Australian alternative youth radio station Triple J and rated in its annual Hottest 100. The band appeared at the Big Day Out concert series and the Woodford Folk Festival.

==== Sunrise Over Sea ====
The song "Zebra" was released as a single in December 2003 and received mainstream radio airplay and reached the top 30 on the ARIA Charts. It was selected as 'Song of the Year' at the APRA Music Awards of 2004. The album, Sunrise Over Sea, was released in March 2004 and peaked at No. 1 on the ARIA Albums Chart. It was the first independently released and distributed album to debut at No. 1 and Butler received the ARIA 'Best Male Artist' award that same year.

==== Grand National ====
In September 2006, John Butler Trio released a promotional studio diary of the recording progress of their next album, Grand National, which was released in March 2007 and peaked at No. 1. In December 2006, Funky Tonight (EP) was released and included tracks from their live shows, such as "Daniella", "Fire in the Sky", and "Funky Tonight". The band performed at the Melbourne entertainment hub, Federation Square at Easter 2007. The one off performance featured musicians who had collaborated on Grand National, including Vika and Linda Bull, Jex Saarhelart and Nicky Bomba. The performance was telecast on JTV and was released on DVD in November.

==== April Uprising ====
On 21 October, Butler featured on SBS Television's documentary called Destination Australia – Bridge Between Two Worlds performing to refugee children in a class at Perth's Highgate Primary School. Butler's discovery of his Bulgarian ancestor's involvement in the April Uprising provided the title for the trio's next No. 1 album, April Uprising, issued in March 2010. Butler performed "How to Make Gravy" and the Kev Carmody/Paul Kelly song "From Little Things Big Things Grow" (with Carmody, Kelly, Missy Higgins and Dan Sultan) at the Kelly tribute concerts staged by Triple J in mid-November 2009, which was released as the 2010 live album Before Too Long.

On 19 February 2011, Butler performed for the first time with his wife Danielle, also known as Mama Kin, under the moniker Brave and the Bird, at the Gimme Shelter event (an annual fundraiser for the homeless) held at the Fremantle Arts Centre.

==== Flesh and Blood ====
The early sessions for the John Butler Trio's sixth studio album commenced in mid-2013, following the band's largest tour of the US. For the first time in the band's lifetime, the members began with a blank songwriting slate, rather than using the initial ideas of Butler that had been introduced. Butler gathered with Luiters and Bomba at The Compound in Fremantle, Western Australia, which serves as the band's headquarters and the frontman's artistic space, and co-wrote material for the first time, deviating from the Butler-centric process of the past: "I had always brought the material." After contributing a large portion of work towards the album, Bomba eventually left the Compound space to work on his Melbourne Ska Orchestra project and was replaced by Grant Gerathy.

Butler explained in an interview during the band's US tour:

But a lot of these songs on this album I kind of magpied. Magpies are this bird in Australia that takes shiny things from anywhere and builds its nest, and so that's kind of what I do. I'll take a little of my own experience of having some heavy party time with certain friends, and then I'll hear some other stories about addicts or other intense relationships. I'll put them into the mixing pot and make up these characters to explore different possibilities and emotional landscapes.

One of the songs on the album, "Wings Are Wide", was written as a dedication to his grandmother, who gave Butler his grandfather's Dobro guitar that became the foundation for his songwriting. Butler admitted that "I wasn't at all into roots music or playing the slide or anything when I got it, and it sat under my bed for a long, long time." Released in Australia on 8 February 2014, Flesh and Blood was produced by Jan Skubiszewski and features a vocal duet with Ainslie Wills.

== Solo ==
On 29 June 2007, Butler gave a live solo performance at Twist and Shout Records in Denver, Colorado, which was released in January 2008 as an eight-track EP, One Small Step, with A$1 from each record sold being donated to Oxfam's "Close the Gap" campaign. One Small Step was Butler's first official solo release. At the ARIA Music Awards of 2007, Butler performed "Funky Tonight" in a collaboration with fellow Australian musician Keith Urban. Radio station, Triple J's listeners voted Grand National their favourite album for 2007.

"Ocean" garnered John Butler newfound success when recordings of live performances of the song went viral on the internet. Butler made a cameo appearance in 2009 Australian film, In Her Skin, as a busker. The film's soundtrack featured three songs by the John Butler Trio, "Ocean", "Caroline" and "What You Want".

"Ocean" by John Butler featured on the benefit album 'Surfing Medicine: Volume I' released in 2009 with Slightly Stoopid, The Pharcyde, and others raised enough funds for charity to conduct an international peer-reviewed herbal cancer research and treatment publication in Journal of Ethnobiology and project by Indigenous leaders from Hawai'i, Jamaica and Africa in Kormantse territory of Ghana which led to a cover story about the 'Ocean' funded charity music project in a surf magazine that won 2 Silver Medals at the American Advertising Awards for best collateral material for any magazine issue and series in America in 2015. Kelly Slater also featured the track 'Ocean' for the charity album project with John Butler in a PSA he released to help promote the project.

In July 2009, Butler undertook a solo overseas tour commencing in North America, where he played at the Montreal Jazz Festival, the Rothbury Music Festival in Michigan and The Mile High Music Festival in Denver. In North America he sold out headline shows in Toronto and Los Angeles. In Europe, Butler played at the Folies Bergère in Paris and London's Union Chapel. He also performed at Cannes, Amsterdam and Antwerp.

Upon his return in August, he took part in the Cannot Buy My Soul concert at the Queensland Music Festival. Butler performed alongside other local musicians (including Paul Kelly, Missy Higgins, Troy Cassar-Daley, Clare Bowditch, Tex Perkins and Bernard Fanning) reinterpreting the catalogue of indigenous Australian musician Kev Carmody. Butler's interpretation of the song, "Thou Shalt Not Steal", was included on the compilation album, and later was featured on the iTunes Deluxe album of Grand National. Butler participated at the Garma Festival of Traditional Cultures located in Northeast Arnhem Land in the Northern Territory.

In 2025, Butler released his solo studio album, Prism, this marked his first full production album after stepping away from the John Butler Trio moniker and was produced entirely solo. When touring to promote the album, Butler formed and played with a band consisting of Michael Barker (drums), Michael Boase (percussion), and Ian Peres (bass guitar). Notably, this was Michael Barker's first return to playing with Butler since 2009, having previously been a member of the John Butler Trio.

== Jarrah ==
In July 2002, Jarrah Records was created by Butler, members of fellow Western Australian act The Waifs and their common manager, Phil Stevens. Being a partner in a record label allowed Butler to maximise artistic control of his recordings.

== Equipment and technique ==
Butler plays harmonica, didgeridoo, drums, lap-steel, banjo and amplified acoustic guitars and his custom-made, 11-string Maton guitar. Butler prefers the Maton custom 11-string guitar and often uses a Seymour Duncan SA-6 Mag Mic pick-up with a Marshall Amplification JMP Super Lead Head and a Marshall 4×12 cabinet. He uses a variety of electronic effects including distortion, reverb / delay and wah-wah pedal to achieve his unique sound. Butler uses long, pointed fibreglass fingernails for finger picking. Ocean's arrangement is similar to Salento pizzica.

== Political activism ==
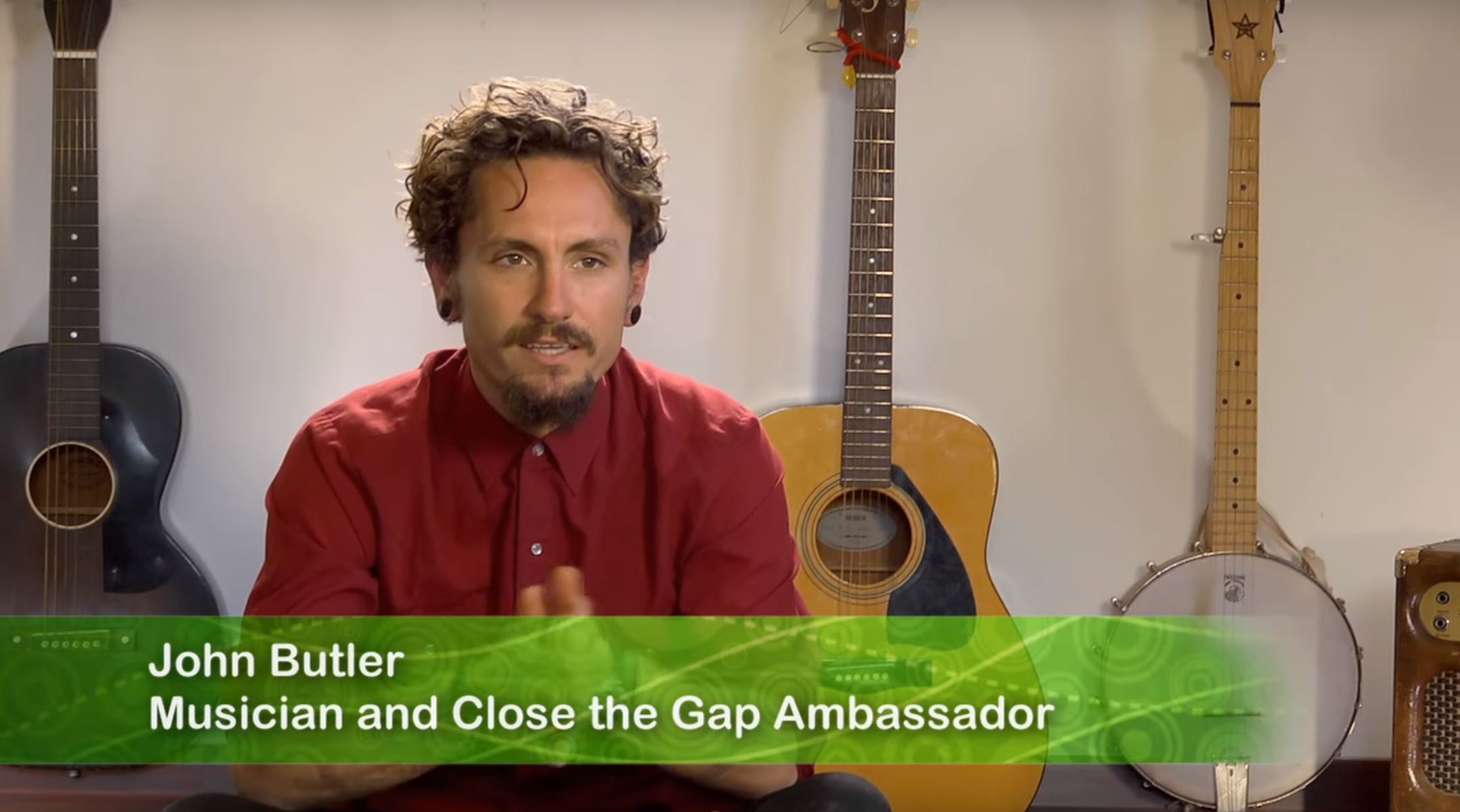
Butler speaking with Oxfam Australia about Close the Gap in 2013

Butler is an advocate of peace, environmental protection, and global harmony. He has supported The Wilderness Society and the Save Ningaloo Reef campaign.

In 2005, Butler and Caruana co-founded the JB Seed grant program – renamed as The Seed in 2010 – to support artistic expression and encourage the "social, cultural and artistic diversity in Australian society". The couple contributed $80,000 to establish the project. Other supporters include Paul Kelly, Correne Wilkie (Manager, The Cat Empire), Paul and Michelle Gilding (Ecoscorp), Maureen Ritchie, Missy Higgins, John Watson (Eleven Music), John Woodruff (JWM Productions), Sebastian Chase (MGM Distribution), Philip Stevens (Jarrah Records), The Waifs and Blue King Brown.

Butler is one of the largest supporters of the "Save The Kimberley" campaign in Australia and performed at the Save the Kimberley concert in Melbourne, Australia's Federation Square in October 2012. On 4 October 2012, Butler was joined by 150 people during a protest outside the BHP Billiton headquarters in Melbourne; the protest was in response to the corporation's involvement with a proposed James Price Point gas industrial complex in Western Australia's Kimberley region.

Butler performed at another concert in support of the Kimberley cause on 24 February 2013, with Missy Higgins also appearing again, with the event held at The Esplanade in Fremantle, Western Australia. Jarrah Records, the record label that Butler co-founded with The Waifs and Phil Stevens, worked in partnership with The Wilderness Society to stage the free event that also featured the band Ball Park Music and Bob Brown, former leader of the Australian Greens. A march to protest the proposed gas refinery construction at James Price Point accompanied the free concert and campaign supporters were photographed with banners and placards.

In response to the proposed dumping of around 3,000,000 cubic metres (110,000,000 cu ft) of dredged seabed onto the Great Barrier Reef, a legal fighting team was formed by World Wide Fund for Nature-Australia and the Australian Marine Conservation Society (AMCS) in late 2013/early 2014. The legal team received further support in April 2014, following the release of the "Sounds for the Reef" musical fundraising project. Produced by Straightup, the digital album features Butler, in addition to artists such as The Herd, Sietta, Missy Higgins, The Cat Empire, Fat Freddys Drop, The Bamboos (featuring Kylie Auldist) and Resin Dogs. Released on 7 April, the album's 21 songs were sold on the Bandcamp website.

Butler is against Coal Seam Gas (CSG) and gave a free supporting concert at the Bentley protesting the Northern Rivers of New South Wales, Australia, on 20 April 2014.

Butler supports freedom of West Papua on Republic of Indonesia.

== Personal life ==
Butler is married to Danielle Caruana, an Australian musician and vocalist who performs under the name of Mama Kin. They have two children, a daughter and a son.

After wearing dreadlocks for 13 years, Butler cut them off in early 2008. In an interview with the Herald Sun newspaper in 2008, Butler acknowledged that he had been referred to as the "million dollar hippie" in various articles and around his hometown in Australia. The nickname refers to his inclusion on the Business Review Weekly list of the 50 richest entertainers in 2004, with reported earnings of A$2.4 million.

Prior to the release of the John Butler Trio's sixth album, Flesh and Blood, Butler explained:

I still care about everything I care about. But I don't know how to write another song about a greedy arsehole ruining the planet. I have done it. I started writing about the damage of war and the environment, but as you drill down deeper, move closer to the core of the heart, there are so many great stories to be had which aren't literally talking about a problem.

Butler also admitted to substance use: "I've never had any big addictions. I feel like I might smoke pot a bit too much, and I've done cigarettes." He affirmed to his audience that he is "normal" and is "going through all the same things" they are, and he asked that he not be placed on a "pedestal".

== Discography ==
=== Albums ===
List of albums, with selected details and chart positions
Title	Album details	Peak chart positions	
Title	Album details	AUS	FRA Rock
Searching for Heritage	Released: 1996; Format: Cassette; Label: John Butler	—	—
One Small Step/ Live At Twist & Shout	Released: 2007; Format: CD; Label: Jarrah Records (JBT013)	23	—
Tin Shed Tales	Released: May 2012; Format: 2×CD, digital; Label: Jarrah Records (JBT017)	28	—
Running River	Released: 24 May 2024; Format: Digital; Label: Family Music	—	—
Still Searching	Released: 1 November 2024; Format: Digital, LP, CD; Label: Family Music	23	—
Prism	Released: 5 September 2025; Format: Digital, LP, CD; Label: Family Music	3	14

=== Charted singles ===
List of singles, with selected details and chart positions
Title	Year	Peak chart positions		Album
Title	Year	JPN Over.	US AAA	Album
"Trippin on You"	2025	—	19	Prism
"So Sorry"	2025	17	—	Prism

== Awards and nominations ==
=== AIR Awards ===
The Australian Independent Record Awards (commonly known informally as AIR Awards) is an annual awards night to recognise, promote and celebrate the success of Australia's Independent Music sector.

Year	Nominee / work	Award	Result
2012	Tin Shed Tales	Best Independent Blues and Roots Album	Nominated
2026	Prism	Best Independent Blues and Roots Album or EP	Nominated

=== APRA Awards ===
The APRA Awards are presented annually from 1982 by the Australasian Performing Right Association (APRA).

Year	Nominee / work	Award	Result
2004	"Zebra" (John Butler) – The John Butler Trio	Song of the Year	Won
2006	"Something's Gotta Give" (John Butler) – The John Butler Trio	Most Performed Blues & Roots Work	Won
2006	"What You Want" (John Butler) – The John Butler Trio	Most Performed Blues & Roots Work	Nominated
2008	"Better Than" (John Butler) – The John Butler Trio	Song of the Year	Nominated
2008	"Funky Tonight" (John Butler) – The John Butler Trio	Blues & Roots Work of the Year	Nominated
2008	"Good Excuse" (John Butler) – The John Butler Trio	Blues & Roots Work of the Year	Won
2010	"One Way Road" (John Butler) – The John Butler Trio	Song of the Year	Shortlisted
2011	"Revolution" (John Butler) – The John Butler Trio	Song of the Year	Nominated
2011	"Close to You" (John Butler) – The John Butler Trio	Blues & Roots Work of the Year	Won
2011	"Close to You" (John Butler) – The John Butler Trio	Most Played Australian Work	Nominated
2011	"One Way Road" (John Butler) – The John Butler Trio	Blues & Roots Work of the Year	Nominated
2011	"One Way Road" (John Butler) – The John Butler Trio	Most Played Australian Work	Nominated
2014	"Only One" (John Butler) – The John Butler Trio	Blues & Roots Work of the Year	Won
2015	"Livin' in the City" (John Butler) – The John Butler Trio	Blues & Roots Work of the Year	Nominated
2020	"Just Call" (John Butler) – The John Butler Trio	Most Performed Blues & Roots Work of the Year	Won

=== ARIA Awards ===
The ARIA Music Awards are presented annually from 1987 by the Australian Recording Industry Association (ARIA). The John Butler Trio have won five awards from 21 nominations (see John Butler Trio awards). Butler has won a further ARIA award for 'Best Male Artist' in 2004 from six nominations in that category.

Year	Nominee / work	Award	Result
2001	Three	Best Male Artist	Nominated
2003	Living 2001-2002	Best Male Artist	Nominated
2004	Sunrise Over Sea	Best Male Artist	Won
2005	"Somethings Gotta Give"	Best Male Artist	Nominated
2007	Grand National	Best Male Artist	Nominated
2010	April Uprising	Best Male Artist	Nominated
2026	Prism	Best Blues & Roots Album	Nominated

== See also ==
- Danielle Caruana

== Notes ==
1. For full name as John Charles Wiltshire-Butler see Australasian Performing Right Association (APRA) search result for songwriter and performer of "Something's Gotta Give".
  - For full name as John Charles Butler see APRA search result for songwriter and performer of "All My Honey".
  - For date and place of birth see Matera.
