= Swamp Thing (band) =

New Zealand blues rock duo

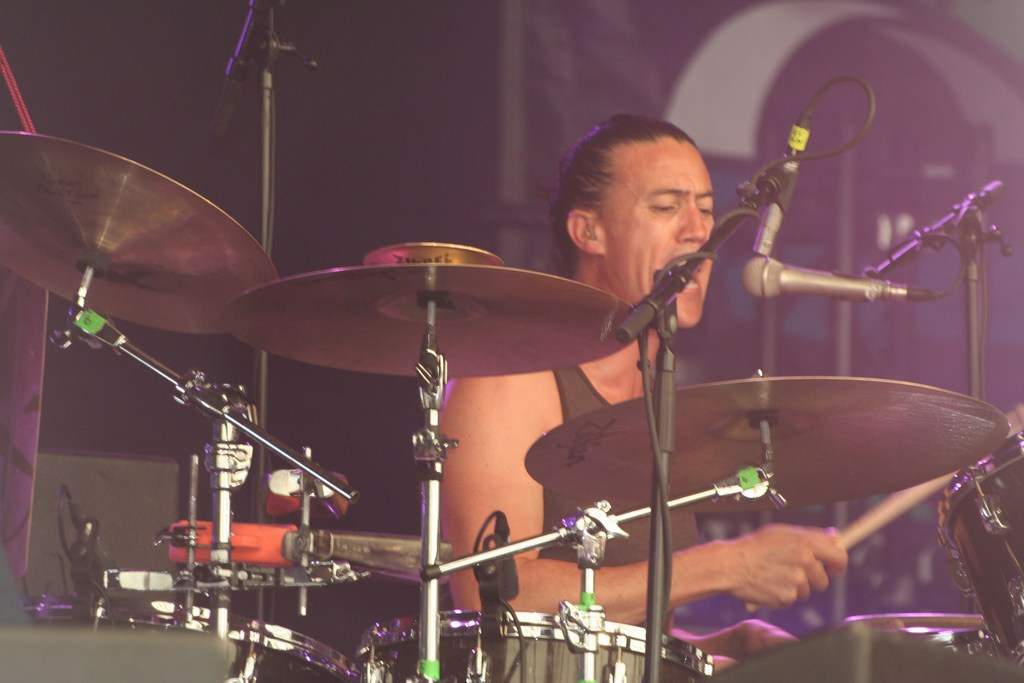
- Barker at the Cambridge Folk Festival

Background information
- Origin: Rotorua, New Zealand
- Genre: Blues rock
- Years active: 2010–present
- Label: Yellow Eye Music
- Members: Michael Barker; Grant Haua
- Website: swampthing.band

Swamp Thing is a New Zealand blues rock duo who define themselves as a "two-man blues roots juggernaut from New Zealand", and consist of Michael Barker (formerly of the John Butler Trio) and Grant Haua.

Barker wrote, recorded and mixed his first solo album, Wonderland, released in November 2006. In 2007, Michael Barker made headlines as he unsuccessfully tried to save the life of a drowning man in Townsville, Queensland.

== Band members ==
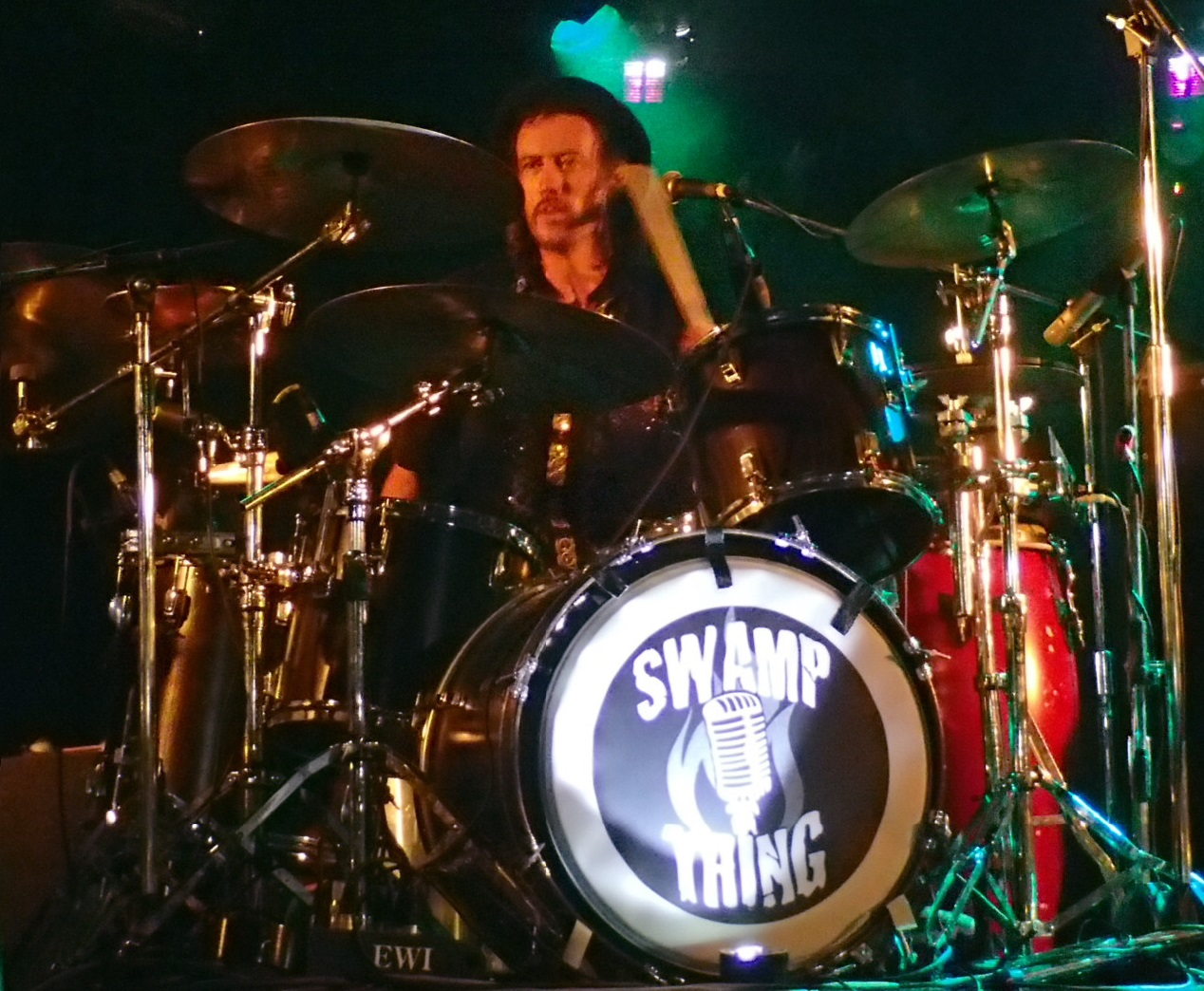
Michael Barker performing at a free gig in Nelson in December 2013.

- Michael Barker - Drums, percussion, vocals
- Grant Haua - Guitar, vocals

== Discography ==
=== Albums ===
Year	Album	Label
2011	Balladeer	Yellow Eye Music
2013	Primordium	Yellow Eye Music
2015	Let's Get Live	Yellow Eye Music
2017	Rumors & Lies	
