= Wonderful Things: Retrospective =

Compilation album by Underground Lovers
- Released: November 2001
- Genre: Indie rock
- Length: 126:55
- Label: Rubber Records
- Producer: Wayne Connolly, Glenn Bennie, Vincent Giarrusso, David Chesworth, Robert Goodge, Simon Grounds

Underground Lovers chronology
Mallboy (2001)	Wonderful Things: Retrospective (2001)	Weekend (2013)

Professional ratings
Review scores
Source	Rating
Sunday Herald Sun	4/5 stars

Wonderful Things: Retrospective is a two-CD compilation album by Australian indie rock/electronic band Underground Lovers, released in November 2001. The album is a 30-track retrospective spanning their entire recording career: while the first disc contains album tracks from Leaves Me Blind (1992) to Cold Feeling (1998), the second contains tracks from CD singles and EPs including a 1990 vinyl single.

The album includes a previously unreleased Japanese-language version of "Holiday"—a song originally on Leaves Me Blind—and also has three remixes of Underground Lovers album tracks. One of those remixes, "Losin' Brunehilda", featured remixing, additional production and rhythm and keyboard programming by Robert Goodge, a former member of Melbourne electronica band Essendon Airport, while "Your Eyes Remix" was remixed by Goodge and former bandmate David Chesworth, with both also sharing rhythm and keyboard programming credits. "Rushall Station Remix", which also credited Goodge for samples and programming, was remixed by dance production duo Sonic Animation—Rupert Keiller and Adrian Cartwright. The track had earlier appeared on Whitey Trickstar, a 1997 album by GBVG, a side project of Underground Lovers founders Glenn Bennie and Vincent Giarrusso.

The album was two years in the making, with all songs remastered by the band's original engineer, Don Bartley.

== Track listing ==
Disc one
No.	Title	Writer(s)	Origin	Length
1.	"Dream It Down"	Glenn Bennie, Vincent Giarrusso	from Dream It Down, 1994	4:32
2.	"Undone"	Bennie, Giarrusso	from Rushall Station, 1996	4:08
3.	"Promenade"	Bennie, Giarrusso	from Leaves Me Blind, 1992	4:31
4.	"Holiday"	Bennie, Giarrusso	from Leaves Me Blind, 1992	3:43
5.	"Starsigns"	Bennie, Giarrusso	from Ways T'Burn, 1997	3:25
6.	"I Was Right"	Maurice Argiro, Glenn Bennie, Vincent Giarrusso	from Leaves Me Blind, 1992	4:18
7.	"Beautiful World"	Bennie, Giarrusso	from Dream It Down, 1994	3:57
8.	"Rushall Station"	Bennie, Giarrusso	from Rushall Station, 1996	5:14
9.	"Cold Feeling"	Bennie, Giarrusso	from Cold Feeling, 1999	6:04
10.	"Losin' It"	Glenn Bennie, Vincent Giarrusso, David Chesworth, Robert Goodge	from Dream It Down, 1994	5:03
11.	"Ways T'Burn"	Argiro, Bennie, Giarrusso	from Ways T'Burn, 1997	4:48
12.	"Recognise"	Bennie, Giarrusso	from Dream It Down, 1994	8:05
13.	"Las Vegas"	Argiro, Bennie, Giarrusso	from Dream It Down, 1994	5:31
14.	"Eastside Stories"	Argiro, Bennie, Giarrusso	from Leaves Me Blind, 1992	7:09
15.	"Your Eyes"	Bennie, Giarrusso	from Leaves me Blind, 1992	8:29

Disc two
No.	Title	Writer(s)	Origin	Length
1.	"Get It On"	Bennie, Giarrusso	from Nice extended-play CD, 1991	1:51
2.	"Corn"	Bennie, Giarrusso	from Nice, 1991	4:08
3.	"Everybody's Favourite"	Philippa Nihill, Vincent Giarrusso	from Nice, 1991	4:01
4.	"Wonderful Things"	Bennie, Giarrusso	from Splendid extended-play EP, 1995	4:09
5.	"Round and Round"	Bennie, Giarrusso	from Round and Round 7-inch single, 1990	2:31
6.	"All Strung Out"	Bennie, Giarrusso	from In My Head CD single, 1996	3:45
7.	"Yeah I Might"	Bennie, Giarrusso	from I Was Right CD single, 1992	2:31
8.	"Leaves Me Blind"	Bennie, Giarrusso	from Leaves me Blind single, 1993	3:26
9.	"Persistent Too"	Bennie, Giarrusso	from Las Vegas CD single, 1994	4:13
10.	"Mumblehead Again"	Bennie, Giarrusso	from Las Vegas, 1994	4:33
11.	"Light"	Bennie, Giarrusso	from Las Vegas, 1994	2:43
12.	"Japanese Holiday"	Bennie, Giarrusso	previously unreleased, 1992	3:44
13.	"Rushall Station Remix"	Bennie, Giarrusso	from Whitey Trickstar, 1996	4:20
14.	"Losin' Brunehilda" (originally on Dream It Down)	Bennie, Giarrusso, Chesworth, Goodge	from Losin' It CD single, 1994	3:46
15.	"Your Eyes Remix"	Bennie, Giarrusso	from Your Eyes CD single, 1993	4:32
