= ARIA Award for Best Independent Release =

Annual Australian music industry award

- Country: Australia
- Presented by: Australian Recording Industry Association (ARIA)
- First award: 1989
- Currently held by: Ecca Vandal, Looking for People to Unfollow (2026)

Highlights
- Most wins: John Butler Trio (3)
- Most nominations: John Butler Trio (7)
- Website: ariaawards.com.au

The ARIA Music Award for Best Independent Release is an award presented at the annual ARIA Music Awards, which recognises "the many achievements of Aussie artists across all music genres", since 1987. It is handed out by the Australian Recording Industry Association (ARIA), an organisation whose aim is "to advance the interests of the Australian record industry."

John Butler Trio hold the record for both the most wins and the most nominations in this category, with three wins from seven nominations, though Ed Kuepper's total nominations also reach seven if his nomination as a member of the Aints is counted. Vance Joy and Dan Sultan are tied for the most nominations without a win with four each. Kuepper is both the only artist to win in consecutive years, which occurred in 1993 and 1994, and the only musician nominated for two acts in the same year, as in 1992 he was nominated both as a solo artist and a member of the Aints. American producer Porter Robinson became the first non-Australian nominee as a co-lead artist on "WannaCry" with Ninajirachi in 2026.

== Winners and nominees ==
In the following table, the winner is highlighted in a separate colour, and in boldface; the nominees are those that are not highlighted or in boldface. Winners are only provided where reliable sources do not mention of nominees.

Winner marked in a separate colour

Year	Winner(s)	Album/Single title
**1989** (3rd)
**1989** (3rd)	**TISM**	**"Apathy"**
**1989** (3rd)	Eric Bogle	Something of Value
**1989** (3rd)	Flederman	Flederman
**1989** (3rd)	Larry Sitsky	Contemporary Australian Piano
**1989** (3rd)	The Spliffs	"Sixteen"
**1990** (4th)
**1990** (4th)	**Wild Pumpkins at Midnight**	**This Machine Is Made of People**
**1990** (4th)	Dubrovniks	Dubrovnik Blues
**1990** (4th)	Girl Monstar	"Surfing on a Wave"/"He's Hell"
**1990** (4th)	Sirocco	Port of Call
**1990** (4th)	Various Artists	Rockin' Bethlehem
**1991** (5th)
**1991** (5th)	**The Killjoys**	**Ruby**
**1991** (5th)	Blue Ruin	I'm Gonna Smile
**1991** (5th)	Girl Monstar	"Joe Cool"
**1991** (5th)	Roaring Jack	Through the Smoke of Innocence
**1991** (5th)	Various Artists	Rockin Bethlehem: The Second Coming
**1992** (6th)
**1992** (6th)	**Not Drowning, Waving**	**Proof**
**1992** (6th)	The Aints	Ascension
**1992** (6th)	Def FX	Water
**1992** (6th)	Ed Kuepper	Honey Steel's Gold
**1992** (6th)	Underground Lovers	Underground Lovers
**1993** (7th)
**1993** (7th)	**Ed Kuepper**	**Black Ticket Day**
**1993** (7th)	The Jackson Code	Strange Cargo
**1993** (7th)	Def FX	Blink (EP)
**1993** (7th)	Melanie Oxley and Chris Abrahams	Welcome to Violet
**1993** (7th)	TISM	Beasts of Suburban
**1994** (8th)
**1994** (8th)	**Ed Kuepper**	**Serene Machine**
**1994** (8th)	The Jackson Code	Dragging the River
**1994** (8th)	Juice	Movin' On
**1994** (8th)	Dave Steel	Cross My Palm
**1994** (8th)	Brenda Webb	"Little Black Girl"
**1995** (9th)
**1995** (9th)	**TISM**	**Machiavelli and the Four Seasons**
**1995** (9th)	Def FX	Ritual Eternal
**1995** (9th)	Ed Kuepper	Character Assassination
**1995** (9th)	Magic Dirt	Life Was Better
**1995** (9th)	Single Gun Theory	Flow, River of My Soul
**1996** (10th)
**1996** (10th)	**You Am I**	**Hourly, Daily**
**1996** (10th)	Custard	Wisenheimer
**1996** (10th)	Ed Kuepper	The Exotic Mail Order Moods of Ed Kuepper
**1996** (10th)	TISM	"Greg! The Stop Sign!!"
**1996** (10th)	Underground Lovers	Rushall Station
**1997** (11th)
**1997** (11th)	**Savage Garden**	**Savage Garden**
**1997** (11th)	Deadstar	"Don't it Get You Down"
**1997** (11th)	Dirty Three	Horse Stories
**1997** (11th)	Ed Kuepper	Frontierland
**1997** (11th)	Even	Less Is More
**1998** (12th)
**1998** (12th)	**The Whitlams**	**Eternal Nightcap**
**1998** (12th)	The Blackeyed Susans	Spin the Bottle
**1998** (12th)	Karma County	Olana
**1998** (12th)	The Living End	"Second Solution / Prisoner of Society"
**1998** (12th)	TISM	www.tism.wanker.com
**1999** (13th)
**1999** (13th)	**Josh Abrahams**	**Sweet Distorted Holiday**
**1999** (13th)	Crawlspace	"Away"
**1999** (13th)	Diana Ah Naid	"Oh No (Curbside Lullaby)"
**1999** (13th)	Pauline Pantsdown	"I Don't Like It"
**1999** (13th)	Pre-Shrunk	"Triple A Side"
**2000** (14th)
**2000** (14th)	**S2S**	**"Sister"**
**2000** (14th)	Diana Ah Naid	I Don't Thing I'm Pregnant
**2000** (14th)	iOTA	The Hip Bone Connection
**2000** (14th)	Skulker	Too Fat for Tahiti
**2000** (14th)	Stella One Eleven	"Only Good for Conversation"
**2001** (15th)
**2001** (15th)	**John Butler Trio**	**Three**
**2001** (15th)	Allan Browne's New Rascals	East St Kilda Toodleoo
**2001** (15th)	Nitocris	Manic
**2001** (15th)	Pre-Shrunk	Digital Sunrise
**2001** (15th)	Stella One Eleven	In Your Hands
**2002** (16th)
**2002** (16th)	**1200 Techniques**	**"Karma (What Goes Around)"**
**2002** (16th)	Icecream Hands	"Rain Hail Shine"
**2002** (16th)	Killing Heidi	Heavensent
**2002** (16th)	Lisa Miller	Car Tape
**2002** (16th)	The Waifs	"London Still"
**2003** (17th)
**2003** (17th)	**The Waifs**	**Up All Night**
**2003** (17th)	1200 Techniques	"Eye of the Storm"
**2003** (17th)	Diesel	Hear
**2003** (17th)	John Butler Trio	Living
**2003** (17th)	The Mess Hall	Feeling Sideways
**2004** (18th)
**2004** (18th)	**John Butler Trio**	**Sunrise Over Sea**
**2004** (18th)	Butterfingers	Breakfast at Fatboys
**2004** (18th)	Jebediah	Braxton Hicks
**2004** (18th)	The Waifs	"Bridal Train"
**2004** (18th)	Dan Kelly and the Alpha Males	Sing the Tabloid Blues
**2005** (19th)
**2005** (19th)	**Ben Lee**	**Awake Is the New Sleep**
**2005** (19th)	Architecture in Helsinki	In Case We Die
**2005** (19th)	Joel Turner and the Modern Day Poets	Joel Turner and the Modern Day Poets
**2005** (19th)	Lior	Autumn Flow
**2005** (19th)	The Waifs	A Brief History...
**2006** (20th)
**2006** (20th)	**Hilltop Hoods**	**The Hard Road**
**2006** (20th)	Ben Lee	"We're All in This Together"
**2006** (20th)	Gotye	Like Drawing Blood
**2006** (20th)	The John Butler Trio	Live at St. Gallen
**2006** (20th)	Lior	Doorways of My Mind
**2007** (21st)
**2007** (21st)	**The John Butler Trio**	**Grand National**
**2007** (21st)	Gotye	Mixed Blood
**2007** (21st)	Hilltop Hoods	The Hard Road: Restrung
**2007** (21st)	Sneaky Sound System	Sneaky Sound System
**2007** (21st)	Wolf & Cub	Vessels
**2008** (22nd)
**2008** (22nd)	**Geoffrey Gurrumul Yunupingu**	**Gurrumul**
**2008** (22nd)	Ben Lee	Ripe
**2008** (22nd)	British India	Thieves
**2008** (22nd)	Lior	Corner of an Endless Road
**2008** (22nd)	Midnight Juggernauts	Dystopia
**2009** (23rd)
**2009** (23rd)	**Bertie Blackman**	**Secrets and Lies**
**2009** (23rd)	C. W. Stoneking	Jungle Blues
**2009** (23rd)	Dappled Cities	Zounds
**2009** (23rd)	Sneaky Sound System	2
**2009** (23rd)	The Drones	Havilah
**2010** (24th)
**2010** (24th)	**Sia**	**We Are Born**
**2010** (24th)	Art vs. Science	Magic Fountain
**2010** (24th)	Dan Sultan	Get Out While You Can
**2010** (24th)	Eddy Current Suppression Ring	Rush to Relax
**2010** (24th)	John Butler Trio	April Uprising
**2011** (25th)
**2011** (25th)	**Art vs. Science**	**The Experiment**
**2011** (25th)	Geoffrey Gurrumul Yunupingu	Rrakala
**2011** (25th)	John Butler Trio	Live at Red Rocks
**2011** (25th)	Tex Perkins & the Dark Horses	Tex Perkins & the Dark Horses
**2011** (25th)	The Jezabels	"Dark Storm"
**2012** (26th)
**2012** (26th)	**The Jezabels**	**Prisoner**
**2012** (26th)	Dappled Cities	Lake Air
**2012** (26th)	Katie Noonan and Karin Schaupp	Songs of the Southern Skies
**2012** (26th)	San Cisco	Awkward
**2012** (26th)	The Bamboos	Medicine Man
**2013** (27th)
**2013** (27th)	**Nick Cave & the Bad Seeds**	**Push the Sky Away**
**2013** (27th)	Big Scary	Not Art
**2013** (27th)	San Cisco	San Cisco
**2013** (27th)	Sheppard	"Let Me Down Easy"
**2013** (27th)	The Drones	I See Seaweed
**2014** (28th)
**2014** (28th)	**Chet Faker**	**Built on Glass**
**2014** (28th)	Dan Sultan	Blackbird
**2014** (28th)	Sheppard	Bombs Away
**2014** (28th)	Vance Joy	"Mess Is Mine"
**2014** (28th)	Violent Soho	"Saramona Said"
**2015** (29th)
**2015** (29th)	**Courtney Barnett**	**Sometimes I Sit and Think, and Sometimes I Just Sit**
**2015** (29th)	Hermitude	Dark Night Sweet Light
**2015** (29th)	Jarryd James	"Do You Remember"
**2015** (29th)	Paul Kelly	The Merri Soul Sessions
**2015** (29th)	Vance Joy	Dream Your Life Away
**2016** (30th)
**2016** (30th)	**Flume**	**Skin**
**2016** (30th)	Jarryd James	Thirty One
**2016** (30th)	King Gizzard & the Lizard Wizard	Nonagon Infinity
**2016** (30th)	Sia	This Is Acting
**2016** (30th)	Violent Soho	WACO
**2017** (31st)
**2017** (31st)	**A.B. Original**	**Reclaim Australia**
**2017** (31st)	Dan Sultan	Killer
**2017** (31st)	Sia	"The Greatest" (featuring Kendrick Lamar)
**2017** (31st)	Tash Sultana	Notion
**2017** (31st)	Vance Joy	"Lay It on Me"
**2018** (32nd)
**2018** (32nd)	**Gurrumul**	**Djarimirri (Child of the Rainbow)**
**2018** (32nd)	Angus & Julia Stone	Snow
**2018** (32nd)	Courtney Barnett	Tell Me How You Really Feel
**2018** (32nd)	DMA's	For Now
**2018** (32nd)	Pnau	"Go Bang"
**2019** (33rd)
**2019** (33rd)	**Tones and I**	**The Kids Are Coming**
**2019** (33rd)	Angie McMahon	Salt
**2019** (33rd)	G Flip	About Us
**2019** (33rd)	Julia Jacklin	Crushing
**2019** (33rd)	The Teskey Brothers	Run Home Slow
**2020** (34th)
**2020** (34th)	**Sampa the Great**	**The Return**
**2020** (34th)	Archie Roach	Tell Me Why
**2020** (34th)	DMA's	The Glow
**2020** (34th)	Lime Cordiale	14 Steps to a Better You
**2020** (34th)	Nick Cave and the Bad Seeds	Ghosteen
**2021** (35th)
**2021** (35th)	**Genesis Owusu**	**Smiling with No Teeth**
**2021** (35th)	Archie Roach	The Songs of Charcoal Lane
**2021** (35th)	Ball Park Music	Ball Park Music
**2021** (35th)	Emma Donovan & The Pushbacks	Crossover
**2021** (35th)	Vance Joy	"Missing Piece"
**2022** (36th)
**2022** (36th)	**Archie Roach**	**"One Song"**
**2022** (36th)	Ball Park Music	Weirder & Weirder
**2022** (36th)	Courtney Barnett	Things Take Time, Take Time
**2022** (36th)	Genesis Owusu	"GTFO"
**2022** (36th)	Julia Jacklin	Pre Pleasure
**2023** (37th)
**2023** (37th)	**Genesis Owusu**	**Struggler**
**2023** (37th)	Cub Sport	Jesus at the Gay Bar
**2023** (37th)	Dan Sultan	Dan Sultan
**2023** (37th)	G Flip	Drummer
**2023** (37th)	Kylie Minogue	"Padam Padam"
**2024** (38th)
**2024** (38th)	**Angie McMahon**	**Light, Dark, Light Again**
**2024** (38th)	Emily Wurramara	Nara
**2024** (38th)	Kylie Minogue	Tension
**2024** (38th)	Miss Kaninna	"Blak Britney"
**2024** (38th)	Royel Otis	Pratts & Pain
**2025** (39th)
**2025** (39th)	**Ninajirachi**	**I Love My Computer**
**2025** (39th)	Ball Park Music	Like Love
**2025** (39th)	Confidence Man	3AM (La La La)
**2025** (39th)	Folk Bitch Trio	Now Would Be a Good Time
**2025** (39th)	Miss Kaninna	Kaninna
**2026** (40th)
**2026** (40th)	**Ecca Vandal**	**Looking for People to Unfollow**
**2026** (40th)	2Charm	"Boyfriend"
**2026** (40th)	Genesis Owusu	Redstar Wu & the Worldwide Scourge
**2026** (40th)	Miss Kaninna	Blackprint
**2026** (40th)	Ninajirachi and Porter Robinson	"WannaCry"

== Artists with multiple wins ==
3 wins

- John Butler Trio

2 wins

- Ed Kuepper
- Genesis Owusu
- TISM

== Artists with multiple nominations ==
7 nominations

- Ed Kuepper (Note: Including one as a member of the Aints.)
- John Butler Trio

5 nominations

- TISM

4 nominations

- Vance Joy
- Genesis Owusu
- Archie Roach (Note: Including the various artists album Rockin Bethlehem: The Second Coming.)
- Dan Sultan
- The Waifs

3 nominations

- Ball Park Music
- Courtney Barnett
- Def FX
- Warren Ellis (Note: One as a member of Dirty Three and two as a member of Nick Cave and the Bad Seeds.)
- Girl Monstar (Note: Including the various artists album Rockin' Bethlehem.)
- The Jackson Code
- Ben Lee
- Lior
- Miss Kaninna
- Sia
- Geoffrey Gurrumul Yunupingu

2 nominations

- 1200 Techniques
- Art vs. Science
- Dappled Cities
- Diana Ah Naid
- DMA's
- The Drones
- The Dubrovniks
- G Flip
- Gotye
- Hilltop Hoods
- Julia Jacklin
- Jarryd James
- The Jezabels
- Paul Kelly
- Angie McMahon
- Kylie Minogue
- Nick Cave and the Bad Seeds
- Ninajirachi
- Pre-Shrunk
- San Cisco
- Sheppard
- Sneaky Sound System
- Dave Steel (Note: Including the various artists album Rockin' Bethlehem as a member of the Whipper Snappers.)
- Stella One Eleven
- Underground Lovers
- Violent Soho
