= Piano Salt =

EP by Angie McMahon
- Released: 2 October 2020
- Recorded: 2018–2020
- Studio: The Perch Recording Studio, Castlemaine. Green Bunch Florist (track 5)
- Label: Angie McMahon
- Producer: Alex O'Gorman, Jono Steer

Angie McMahon chronology
Salt (2019)	Piano Salt (2020)	Light, Dark, Light Again (2023)

Singles from Piano Salt
- 1. "If You Call" Released: 7 May 2020; 2. "Soon" / "The River" Released: 16 September 2020

Piano Salt is the second extended play by Australian singer-songwriter Angie McMahon. The EP was released on 2 October 2020 and peaked at number 19 on the ARIA chart.

The EP is a combination of reimagined piano versions of McMahon's debut studio album Salt, as well as a two of her favourite covers by Lana Del Rey and Bruce Springsteen. McMahon said "Piano is the first instrument I learnt and the one that made me first love singing. My favourite piano song when I was young was k.d lang's cover of 'Hallelujah'. So this EP feels like a return to my piano-cover-loving inner kid. It's been a really nice creative opportunity to recreate the feeling of some bigger songs off my first record, give them a new life, and cover some of my favourite songs too. It gave me something to do when we went into quarantine. The creative process also helped me shed some fear around sounding too cheesy on the piano, or too sad - I realised that doesn't matter so much because I just love to play and sing."

In choosing songs, McMahon said, "Some of the other songs on the record would easily offer themselves to piano, they're a bit more ballad-y. So I just kind of felt like, because they were the furthest from a piano ballad, they felt like the right ones to do."

== Track listing ==
No.	Title	Writer(s)	Length
1.	"Soon"	Angie McMahon	3:52
2.	"Slow Mover"	McMahon	4:32
3.	"Keeping Time"	McMahon	3:25
4.	"The River"	Bruce Springsteen	5:46
5.	"If You Call" (featuring Leif Vollebekk)	McMahon	5:47
6.	"Born to Die"	Elizabeth Grant, Justin Parker	4:25
7.	"Pasta"	McMahon	5:41

== Charts ==
Chart (2020)	Peak position
Australian Albums (ARIA)	19

== Release history ==
Region	Date	Format	Label	Catalogue
Australia	2 October 2020	CD; digital download; streaming; vinyl LP	Angie McMahon	AM002PCD / AM002PLP
United States	2020	digital download; streaming; vinyl LP	Dualtone	803020219212
