= Light, Dark, Light Again =

Studio album by Angie McMahon
- Released: 27 October 2023
- Length: 49:45
- Label: Gracie Music; AWAL
- Producer: Angie McMahon; Brad Cook; Alex O'Gorman

Angie McMahon chronology
Piano Salt (2020)	Light, Dark, Light Again (2023)

Singles from Light, Dark, Light Again
- 1. "Saturn Returning" Released: 9 June 2023; 2. "Letting Go" Released: 12 July 2023; 3. "Fireball Whiskey" Released: 25 August 2023; 4. "Exploding" Released: 22 September 2023; 5. "Making it Through" Released: 27 October 2023

Light, Dark, Light Again is the second studio album by Australian singer-songwriter Angie McMahon. The album was announced on Triple J on 12 July 2023 and released on 27 October 2023.

At the 2023 J Awards, the album was nominated for Australian Album of the Year.

The album was nominated for the 2023 Australian Music Prize. The album won Best Album at the 2024 Music Victoria Awards.

At the 2024 ARIA Music Awards, the album was nominated for Album of the Year, Best Rock Album and for McMahon, Best Solo Artist. The album won Best Independent Release.

== Recording ==
Light, Dark, Light Again was recorded between Melbourne, Australia and Durham, USA with producers Brad Cook, Alex O'Gorman and Bonnie Knight.

== Critical reception ==
Professional ratings
Review scores
Source	Rating
The AU Review	5/5 stars
The Guardian	4/5 stars

Zoë Radas from Stack Magazine wrote that "As its title suggests, Light, Dark, Light Again considers dualities. But it's the movement between those positions – the undulations and the way states return to a former shape before changing again – which Angie McMahon finds fascinating" further adding "McMahon rarely sings static statements like 'I am this' or 'it is that', but communicates the constant evolution and progression of things with phrases like 'I am learning to', 'I hope I continue to'". Radas named 'Mother Nature' as the album "stand out".

Jules LeFevre from The Sydney Morning Herald felt that "Where Salt was pared back, Light, Dark, Light Again is expansive and cinematic: harmonies ricochet atop thundering drums, guitars build into walls of sound, and Angie's voice stretches powerfully outwards."

Giselle Au-Nhien Nguyen from The Guardian said, "As its title suggests, Light, Dark, Light Again moves through emotional and sonic worlds both gentle and heavy, always returning to the former." She added: "This beautiful, soothing record shows McMahon's skills not only as a songwriter and storyteller but as a wise guide for the busy and anxious modern mind."

Mary Varvaris from The Music stated that "McMahon sings and writes about universal concepts, such as heartbreak, depression, accountability, and anxiety. And on the highly anticipated, rewarding follow-up to her 2019 debut album, Salt, McMahon tackles those experiences like nobody else." They ended their review saying "Light, Dark, Light Again isn't exactly a happy album, but for those who connect with McMahon's authentic storytelling and messages, it might just feel like the soothing hug you need right now."

Mikey Cahill from NME called it a "cathartic and exhilarating second album".

In a five-star review, Dylan Marshall from The AU Review said "A step up in production and vibe from her last album, McMahon placed an emphasis on creating songs that are warm, cosmic and vast in their content, volume and vibe." Marshall called the album "something special" and said "Light, Dark, Light Again is an album of growth, confidence and acceptance. It will go down as one for the ages."

In the week of release, it was Triple J's feature album of the week, with the station saying, "Bubbling with cinematic indie rock, raw and empowering lyrics, this is a record that sees Angie stepping out from the past and embracing her fears; using them as a journey to a bigger, brighter future."

== Track listing ==
Light, Dark, Light Again track listing
No.	Title	Writer(s)	Length
1.	"Saturn Returning"	McMahon	2:47
2.	"Fireball Whiskey"	McMahon	3:29
3.	"Fish"	McMahon	4:33
4.	"Letting Go"	McMahon	3:30
5.	"Divine Fault Line"	McMahon, Emma Louise Lobb	4:18
6.	"Mother Nature"	McMahon	2:41
7.	"Black Eye"	McMahon	3:43
8.	"Exploding"	McMahon, Jennifer Decilveo	4:01
9.	"I Am Already Enough"	McMahon, Meg Duffy	2:58
10.	"Serotonin"	McMahon	4:19
11.	"Staying Down Low"	McMahon, Olivia Hally, Lachlan O'Kane	4:37
12.	"Music's Coming In"	McMahon, Hannah McKittrick	4:07
13.	"Making It Through"	McMahon	4:42
Total length:			49:45

== Charts ==
Chart performance for Light, Dark, Light Again
Chart (2023)	Peak position
Australian Albums (ARIA)	6

== Awards and nominations ==
Awards and nominations for Light, Dark, Light Again
Award	Year	Category	Result	Ref.
J Awards	2023	Australian Album of the Year	Nominated	
