= Angie McMahon =

Australian singer-songwriter

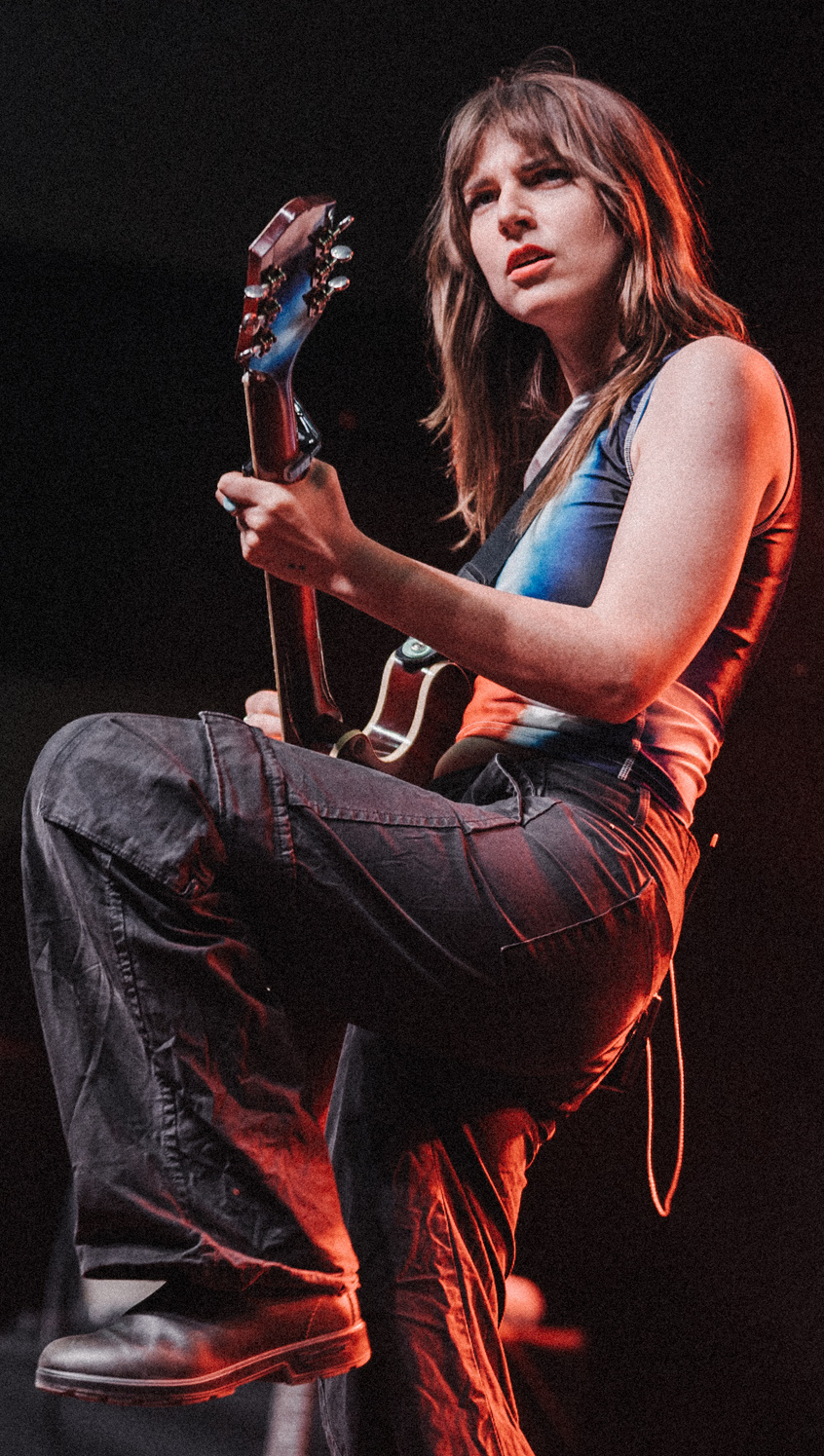
- McMahon in 2024

Background information
- Born: Alphington, Victoria, Australia
- Years active: 2013–present
- Labels: Angie McMahon, AWAL
- Website: angiemcmahon.com

Angie McMahon is an Australian singer-songwriter and musician from Melbourne, Victoria. She released her debut studio album Salt in 2019.

== Early life ==
McMahon grew up in the Melbourne suburb of Alphington and began piano lessons at four years of age.

McMahon was inspired to be an artist after hearing Missy Higgins' The Sound of White, saying "That was a really big turning point in my life. I felt like [after] listening to that record and learning to play the songs, which I did a lot, I had a clear understanding of what I wanted to do with myself."

== Career ==
=== 2013–2021: Salt ===
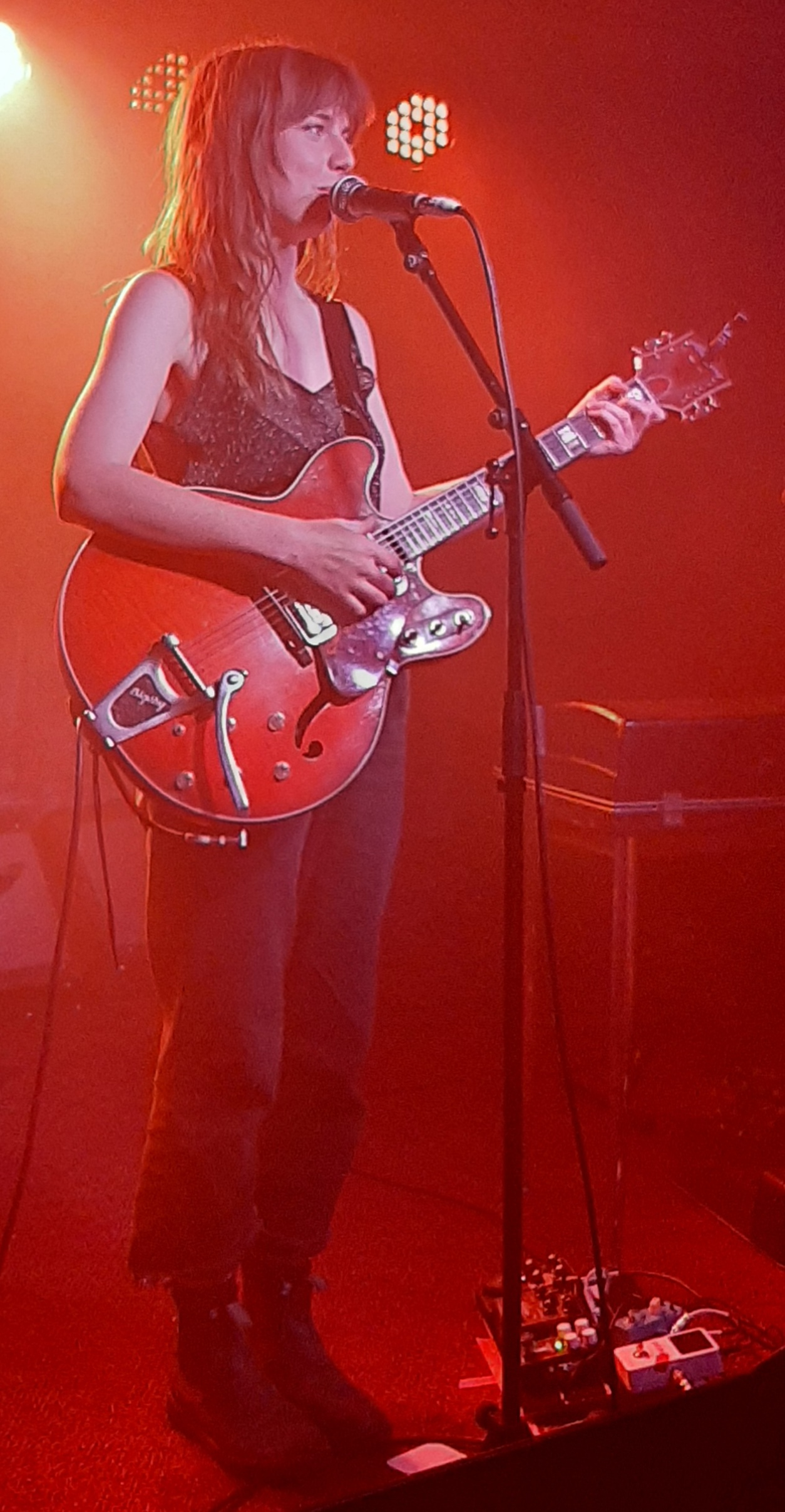
McMahon performing in 2021

McMahon performed in a nine-piece soul band called The Fabric before beginning her solo career. She won a Telstra competition in 2013 to open for Bon Jovi on the Australian leg of their Because We Can tour.

McMahon completed an arts degree at the University of Melbourne. She returned to music in 2017.

In 2017, McMahon won the Josh Pyke Partnership, releasing her debut single "Slow Mover" in the same year. She then later released the singles, "Missing Me", "Keeping Time", a cover of Neil Young's "Helpless", "Pasta", and "And I am a Woman".

Her debut album, Salt, was released in July 2019 and peaked at #5 on the ARIA Charts. A live extended play was released in September 2019.

In October 2019, Happy Mag labelled her as "one of the most endearing and talented voices in music today," placing her at no. 15 on their list of "The 15 Australian female artists changing the game right now." On 3 October 2019, McMahon released a cover of Tom Waits' "Take It With Me"; the lead single from an all-female tribute album to the singer titled Come On Up to the House: Women Sing Waits. In November 2019, McMahon released a cover of the Fleetwood Mac song, "Silver Springs"; a song McMahon names as her favourite. In February 2020, McMahon released a cover version of ABBA's "Knowing Me, Knowing You" as part of Triple J's Like a Version.

=== 2022–present: Light, Dark, Light Again ===
In June 2023, McMahon released the single "Saturn Returning", her first new single in three years.

On 12 July 2023, McMahon released "Letting Go" and announced her second studio album, Light, Dark, Light Again. The album was released on 27 October 2023.

Announced in February 2024, McMahon embarked on the "Making it Through Tour" in May and June 2024, encompassing 13 shows in Australia and New Zealand, which included selling out three nights at the Forum Theatre in her hometown Melbourne.

In August, McMahon released "Untangling" and announced an EP titled Light Sides would be released on 13 September 2024.

In October 2026 Angie McMahon featured prominently onstage at the PEOPLE festival in Berlin, notably with Aaron Dessner from The National, Ben Howard, and Adam Cohen, who asked her to cover his father Leonard Cohen's song Lover, Lover, Lover.. She said the experiment in musical collaboration was "balm" for her soul.

== Discography ==
=== Albums ===
Title	Album details	Peak chart positions
Title	Album details	AUS
Salt	Released: 26 July 2019; Label: Angie McMahon, AWAL (AM001CD); Formats: CD, LP, digital download, streaming	5
Light, Dark, Light Again	Released: 27 October 2023; Label: Angie McMahon, AWAL (AM003CD); Formats: CD, LP, digital download, streaming	6

=== Extended plays ===
Title	EP details	Peak chart positions
Title	EP details	AUS
Audiotree Live	Released: 10 September 2019; Label: Audio Tree; Formats: Digital download, streaming	—
Piano Salt	Released: 2 October 2020; Label: Angie McMahon (AM002PCD); Formats: CD, LP, digital download, streaming	19
Light Sides	Released: 13 September 2024; Label: Gracie Music, AWAL; Formats: Digital download, streaming	—

=== Singles ===
==== As lead artist ====
List of singles, with year released, selected certifications and album shown
Title	Year	Certifications	Album
"Slow Mover"	2017	ARIA: 2× Platinum	Salt
"Missing Me"	2018	ARIA: Platinum	Salt
"Keeping Time"	2018	ARIA: Gold	Salt
"Helpless" (with Mahogany)	2018		Non-album single
"Pasta"	2019	ARIA: Gold	Salt
"And I am a Woman"	2019		Salt
"Silver Springs"	2019		Non-album singles
"Total Eclipse of the Heart"	2020		Non-album singles
"Knowing Me, Knowing You" (Triple J Like a Version)	2020		Non-album singles (Note: Later included on the 2025 compilation Triple J's Best Australian Like A Version)
"If You Call" (featuring Leif Vollebekk)	2020		Piano Salt
"Soon"/"The River" (piano)	2020	ARIA: Gold	Piano Salt
"Tea, Milk & Honey"	2021		Amerikinda: 20 Years of DualTone
"Saturn Returning"	2023		Light, Dark, Light Again
"Letting Go"	2023		Light, Dark, Light Again
"Fireball Whiskey"	2023		Light, Dark, Light Again
"Exploding"	2023		Light, Dark, Light Again
"Making It Through"	2023		Light, Dark, Light Again
"Reckless" (Triple J Like a Version)	2024		Non-album single
"Just Like North"	2024		Light Sides
"Untangling"	2024		Light Sides
"Take It to the Limit" (with Leif Vollebekk)	2025		Non-album single
"Honeycrash" (with Sasami)	2026		Non-album single

==== As featured artist ====
List of singles as featured artist
Title	Year	Album
"Slave" (Jim Alxndr featuring Angie McMahon)	2019	Non-album single
"Angie (I've Been Lost)" (Fred again.. featuring Angie McMahon)	2021	Actual Life (April 14 – December 17, 2020)
"Light Dark Light" (Fred again.. featuring Angie McMahon)	2024	Two More Days
"What I Aim For" (Konradsen featuring Angie McMahon)	2026	Hunt Gather

=== Guest appearances ===
List of guest appearances, showing year released and album name
Title	Year	Album
"Take It with Me"	2019	Come On Up to the House: Women Sing Waits

== Awards and nominations ==
=== AIR Awards ===
The Australian Independent Record Awards (commonly known informally as AIR Awards) is an annual awards night to recognise, promote and celebrate the success of Australia's Independent Music sector.

Year	Nominee / work	Award	Result	Ref.
2018	"Slow Mover"	Breakthrough Independent Artist	Nominated	
2020	herself	Breakthrough Independent Artist	Nominated	
2020	Salt	Best Independent Rock Album or EP	Won	

=== APRA Awards ===
The APRA Awards are presented annually from 1982 by the Australasian Performing Right Association (APRA), "honouring composers and songwriters". They commenced in 1982.

Year	Nominee / work	Award	Result	Ref.
2019	"Slow Mover"	Rock Work of the Year	Nominated	
2019	"Slow Mover"	Song of the Year	Nominated	
2020	"Pasta"	Song of the Year	Shortlisted	
2024	"Letting Go"	Song of the Year	Nominated	
2025	"Making It Through"	Song of the Year	Shortlisted	

=== ARIA Music Awards ===
The ARIA Music Awards is an annual awards ceremony that recognises excellence, innovation, and achievement across all genres of Australian music. Angie McMahon has been nominated for six awards.

Year	Nominee / work	Award	Result	Ref.
2019	Salt	Best Independent Release	Nominated	
2024	Light, Dark, Light Again	Album of the Year	Nominated	
2024	Light, Dark, Light Again	Best Independent Release	Won	
2024	Light, Dark, Light Again	Best Rock Album	Nominated	
2024	herself	Best Solo Artist	Nominated	
2024	Making It Through Tour	Best Australian Live Act	Nominated	

=== Australian Music Prize ===
The Australian Music Prize (the AMP) is an annual award of $30,000 given to an Australian band or solo artist in recognition of the merit of an album released during the year of award. It exists to discover, reward and promote new Australian music of excellence.

Year	Nominee / work	Award	Result	Ref.
2023	Light, Dark, Light Again	Australian Music Prize	Nominated	

=== Environmental Music Prize ===
The Environmental Music Prize is a quest to find a theme song to inspire action on climate and conservation. It commenced in 2022.

Year	Nominee / work	Award	Result	Ref.
2025	"Mother Nature"	Environmental Music Prize	Nominated	

=== J Awards ===
The J Awards are an annual series of Australian music awards that were established by the Australian Broadcasting Corporation's youth-focused radio station Triple J. They commenced in 2005.

Year	Nominee / work	Award	Result	Ref.
2018	Angie McMahon	Unearthed Artist of the Year	Nominated	
2023	Light, Dark, Light Again	Australian Album of the Year	Nominated	
2024	Angie McMahon	Australian Live Act of the Year	Won	

=== Music Victoria Awards ===
The Music Victoria Awards are an annual awards night celebrating Victorian music. They commenced in 2006.

Year	Nominee / work	Award	Result	Ref.
2018	Angie McMahon	Best Solo Artist	Nominated	
2018	Angie McMahon	Breakthrough Act	Nominated	
2019	Salt	Best Album	Nominated	
2019	Angie McMahon	Best Female Musician	Nominated	
2019	Angie McMahon	Best Solo Artist	Nominated	
2020	Angie McMahon	Best Solo Artist	Nominated	
2024	Light, Dark, Light Again	Best Album	Won	

=== National Live Music Awards ===
The National Live Music Awards (NLMAs) are a broad recognition of Australia's diverse live industry, celebrating the success of the Australian live scene. The awards commenced in 2016.

Year	Nominee / work	Award	Result	Ref.
2019	Angie McMahon	Live Indie / Rock Act of the Year	Won	
