= Rockin Bethlehem: The Second Coming =

Rockin Bethlehem: The Second Coming is a 1990 compilation album, following on from Rockin' Bethlehem It featured 14 christmas songs recorded by independent Australian bands. It was created by Timberyard Records to support the Camperdown Children's Hospital. It received a 1991 ARIA Award nomination for Best Independent Release.

== Track listing ==
1. Screaming Tribesmen – Santa's Little Helper
2. Rum Babas – Christmas Sweeps Away Another Year
3. Ape The Cry – Funny World
4. Painters and Dockers – Merry Christmas, Carol
5. Rob Craw – When It's Christmas Time
6. Falling Joys – Little Drummer Boy
7. Dom Mariani's Orange – Christmasonic
8. Archie Roach & Paul Kelly – Christmas Eve
9. Psychotic Turnbuckles – Psychotic Christmas
10. Hellmenn – Sock It To Me Santa
11. Lost Boys – Guiding Star
12. The Healers – Six White Boomers
13. Stu Spasm's Bubble Machine – Ho Ho Ho
14. Celibate Rifles – Merry Xmas Blues
