= Missing Me (Angie McMahon song) =

Single by Angie McMahon

from the album Salt
- Released: 26 February 2018
- Length: 3:19
- Label: Angie McMahon
- Songwriter(s): Angie McMahon

Angie McMahon singles chronology
"Slow Mover" (2017)	"Missing Me" (2018)	"Keeping Time" (2018)

"Missing Me" is a song written and performed by Australian singer Angie McMahon. The song was released in February 2018 as the second single from McMahon's debut studio album Salt (2019). The song was certified gold in Australia in 2019.

Upon released, McMahon told Richard Kingsmill on Triple J "It felt like a lot of things, it's sad but it also makes me feel powerful when I sing it. That's what songwriting is for me, it's therapy; it's a way to get over the thing. I had all the feelings bubbling under the surface and that was the unleashing, the tipping point, the sassy empowerment song."

The song polled at number 49 on the Triple J Hottest 100, 2018.

== Reception ==
Al Newstead from Triple J described the song as "a punchy, angsty rumbler" saying "The stark, stabbing opening chords and Angie's vocals plumb the depths of anger, confusion, and rejection but wipes the sadness away with a powerful performance that laps like waves between wounded sorrow and sass; it's bruised and bluesy but also an emboldening biteback."

== Track listing ==
- Digital download
1. "Missing Me" – 3:19

== Certifications ==
Region	Certification	Certified units/sales
Australia (ARIA)	Platinum	70,000^{‡}
^{‡} Sales+streaming figures based on certification alone.

== Release history ==
Country	Date	Format	Label
Australia	26 February 2018	Digital download	Angie McMahon
