= Mallboy (album) =

Soundtrack album by Underground Lovers
- Released: 2001
- Genre: Electronic
- Length: 42:34
- Label: Silvertone
- Producers: Philip Brophy, Glenn Bennie, Vincent Giarrusso, Robert Goodge

Underground Lovers chronology
Cold Feeling (1999)	Mallboy (2001)	Wonderful Things: Retrospective (2011)

Professional ratings
Review scores
Source	Rating
Sunday Herald Sun	2/5 stars
The Australian	3/5 stars
The Age	2/5 stars
Herald Sun	3/5 stars
Sydney Morning Herald	3.5/5 stars

Mallboy is a soundtrack album by Australian indie rock/electronic band Underground Lovers, released in 1997. The music was written as a score for the feature film of the same name written and directed by Underground Lovers keyboardist Vincent Giarrusso and starring Kane McNay and Neil Feeney.

Much of the album is atmospheric in tone, with sound effects echoing the inner-city environment, but Giarrusso said his decision to limit the number of songs on the album was deliberate.

"I was adamant with the soundtrack that we didn't want a party tape, the back catalogue of a record company," he told The Australian. Instead he wrote minimal instrumentation, such as single guitar notes, to convey the inner state of the lead character, Shaun, by suggesting his turmoil. Giarrusso then worked with sound designer Philip Brophy to cut the film to the music rather than the other way around.

== Track listing ==
(All songs by Glenn Bennie and Vincent Giarrusso except where noted)

1. "Escalation" – 1:55
2. "In a World of Shit" – 3:52
3. "Trucks, Trams and Automobiles" – 0:47
4. "The Mull is High in the Paddocks" – 3:38
5. "Shaun in the City" – 1:08
6. "Crunchy Payola Sweet" – 2:35
7. "The Squirrel Grippers" – 3:08
8. "Shaun's Motif in G" – 1:52
9. "I Love My Trackies Man" – 3:37
10. "Souse Une Bonne Etoile" – 1:00
11. "Mainman Mall Motif" – 1:25
12. "Western Boy" — 1:12
13. "Shaun's Motif in D Movement to Clarity" – 2:00
14. "Twittering" — 1:02
15. "Suburban Spawls" — 8:18
16. "Shaun's Motif in D Reprise" – 1:16
17. "Trackies Remix" — 3:37

== Personnel ==
- Glenn Bennie – guitar
- Vincent Giarrusso – vocals, keyboards

Additional musicians

- Philip Brophy — drums ("Escalation", "Trucks, Trams and Automobiles", "Mainman Mall Motif")
- Roderick Kempton — bass ("Crunchy Payola Sweet", "Suburban Spawls")
- Andrew Nunns — drums ("Crunchy Payola Sweet", "Suburban Spawls")
