= Vessels (Wolf & Cub album) =

Studio album by Wolf & Cub
- Released: 28 August 2006
- Recorded: 2005–2006
- Genres: Psychedelic, funk
- Length: 46:05
- Labels: Dot Dash, 4AD, Remote Control
- Producers: Tony Doogan, Matt Hills, Wolf & Cub

Wolf & Cub chronology
Steal their Gold (2005)	Vessels (2006)	Science and Sorcery (2009)

Singles from Vessels
- 1. "This Mess" Released: 13 March 2007; 2. "March of Clouds" Released: 28 April 2007

Vessels is the first full-length album from psychedelic rock group Wolf & Cub. It was recorded in Adelaide, Australia from April 2005 and released on 28 August 2006. The album was mixed by producer Tony Doogan after lead singer Joel Byrne travelled to Scotland for 3 weeks. Tony Doogan previously worked with artists such as Mogwai, Belle & Sebastian, Super Furry Animals, Dirty Pretty Things and The Mountain Goats. The album was mastered by Greg Calbi in New York. Vessels features nine completely new tracks from the band and a reworking of their earlier single "Steal Their Gold". It peaked in the top 100 of the ARIA Albums Chart.

== Reception ==
Professional ratings
Review scores
Source	Rating
AllMusic	link
Blunt	6 Sep
Pitchfork	5.2/10
Playboy	7.5/10 link
Sound Generator	8/10 link
Spin	March 2007, p.99
URB	9/10 March 2007, p.98
Vice	link
Zoo Weekly	28 August

The album was Drum Media's fifth most favoured album of 2006 as decided by over 20 reviewers. Internet publication and magazine, Mess + Noise, voted Vessels' album artwork as the best of 2006. The album was bestowed Album of the Week by popular alternative radio station Triple J in September.

== Versions ==
Vessels was released on 28 August 2006 via Dot Dash in Australia. On 6 March 2007 it appeared on the 4AD label (home of TV on the Radio, Pixies, Breeders, Thievery Corporation, The Mountain Goats) elsewhere in the world. It comes in two formats: a standard jewel case edition and a limited edition digipak with embossed gold writing.

== Track listing ==
Music by Wolf & Cub. Words by Joel Byrne.

1. "Vessels" – 6:42
2. "This Mess" – 3:48
3. "Rozalia Bizarre" – 3:37
4. "Hammond" – 3:55
5. "March of Clouds" – 4:14
6. "Kingdom" – 7:26
7. "Seeds of Doubt" – 3:55
8. "Conundrum" – 5:01
9. "Steal Their Gold" – 4:26
10. "Vultures, Part 2, Section 2" – 2:53

== Personnel ==
- Joel Byrne – vox, guitars, keys
- Thomas Mayhew – bass
- Joel Carey – drums/percussion
- Adam Edwards – drums/percussion
- Matt Hills – producer
- Tony Doogan – mixing, additional production, recording
- Greg Calbi – mastering
- Monica Queen – backing vocals

== Charts ==
Chart performance for Vessels
Chart (2008)	Peak position
Australian Albums (ARIA)	72
