= Wolf & Cub =

Australian psychedelic rock band

- Left to right: Joel Byrne, Joel Carey, Marvin Hammond and Thomas Mayhew; Sydney, 5 August 2007

Background information
- Origin: Adelaide, South Australia
- Genre: Psychedelic rock
- Years active: 2002–present
- Labels: Dot Dash, 4AD
- Members: Joel Byrne; Jonathan Boulet; Wade Keighran; Brock Fitzgerald
- Past members: Adam Edwards; Tom Mayhew; Marvin Hammond; Joel Carey
- Website: Official website

Wolf & Cub are a psychedelic rock band from Adelaide, Australia. Three of the original members hail from Port Augusta. The four-piece were signed to record label 4AD, which make use of two drummers. This allows the percussive elements of their music to feature more prominently alongside the guitar. Their name derives from a comic from Japan, "Lone Wolf and Cub". Wolf & Cub signed with Last Gang records in North America. Their third studio album, Heavy Weight, was released in 2013.

== History ==
Wolf & Cub formed in 2002 in Adelaide with Joel Byrne on lead vocals and guitar, Adam Edwards on drums and percussion, and Thomas Mayhew on bass guitar. Byrne, Edwards and Mayhew had met at high school in Port Augusta. Joel Carey met Byrne at university, he joined initially just on percussion, later becoming the second drummer. After playing regularly around Adelaide the band signed to an Australian label, Dot Dash Recordings, with representation from Remote Control Records. On 1 November 2004 they released their first EP, Wolf & Cub, with five tracks, including "Thousand Cuts". It was co-produced by the band with Matt Hills in April that year.

In 2005, a 7" record featuring "Thousand Cuts" was released in the United Kingdom, which was played on the Zane Lowe and Steve Lamacq radio shows on the BBC. The track was heard by producer Paul Epworth (Bloc Party, The Futureheads), who took it into the studio and recorded the Phones Remix. This became a white label 12" version and later became John Kennedy's Single of the Week on XFM. They signed to international label, 4AD, in September and played in a string of London shows for 4AD's 25th Anniversary with The Breeders in November. In October 2005 the band released their second EP, Steal Their Gold, which included "Thousand Cuts" (Phones Slasher Remix). They toured Japan and the UK. "Steal Their Gold" was named Single of the Week status by Lamacq and the band received greater attention from the UK press.

In Australia, the band performed with TV on the Radio, The Killers, The Music, Wolfmother, Queens of the Stone Age (handpicked by Josh Homme) and Death from Above 1979. The quartet played in multiple festivals, such as Big Day Out and Homebake, and underwent two nationwide tours of Australia. Work on Wolf & Cub's debut album, Vessels, began in April 2005: Hills co-produced with Tony Doogan. It was released in Australia on 28 August 2006, which peaked in the ARIA Albums Chart top 100. It received generally favourable responses from critics, including becoming the fifth most favoured album of The Drum Media's editors and contributors for 2006. 4AD released the album internationally on 6 March 2007. In the same month, the band toured the US playing at SXSW and a 4AD showcase.

Rock music you can dance to. Many have tried, some have come close, but none have got the formula right. Until now. Port Augusta's Wolf & Cub have definitely found the right ingredients and if driving bass lines, howling guitar and an eight limbed, two headed drummer is your thing, you should check them out.
-Adam Wilding, live review of the Annandale show, 29 September 2006, The Drum Media

On 20 May 2007, the band announced on their MySpace page that Edwards had left and that they were looking for a new drummer: "Well, just letting everyone know that it was Adam's last show on Saturday night at the Adelaide Uni Bar... We'd like to thank Adam for everything and wish him all the best in everything he's going to get up to". On 8 July they announced the replacement drummer is Marvin Hammond from Adelaide band Artax Mission.

In June 2008, Wolf & Cub released another EP, One to the Other, produced by Christopher Colonna from Bumblebeez. Their second studio album, Science and Sorcery followed on 18 April 2009, which peaked at No. 8 on the ARIA Hitseekers Albums Chart.

In 2011, Brock Fitzgerald on drums and percussion and Wade Keighran on bass guitar (both formerly of The Scare) joined Byrne and Carey in a new line-up of Wolf & Cub. In 2012 they previewed their new direction with their single, "Salao". Their single "I Need More" appeared ahead of their third album, Heavy Weight (13 September 2013), it was recorded and produced by the band at Sydney's Linear studios, and mixed by Burke Reid (The Drones, PVT, Oh Mercy). It was made available digitally and in retail stores via MGM Distribution.

== Members ==
- Joel Byrne – vocals, electric guitar, percussion
- Jonathan Boulet – drums/percussion
- Wade Keighran – bass guitar
- Brock Fitzgerald – drums/percussion, keyboard, guitar

== Discography ==
=== Albums ===
List of studio albums, with selected details and chart positions
Title	Details	Peak chart positions
Title	Details	AUS
Vessels	Released: 2006; Label: Dot Dash (DASH004CD); Formats: CD, DD	72
Science and Sorcery	Released: 2009; Label: Dot Dash (DASH011CD); Formats: CD, DD	—
Heavy Weight	Released: 2013; Label: Wolf & Cub Music (WAC003); Formats: CD, DD	—
Nil	Released: 20 November 2020; Label: Wolf & Cub Music; Formats: CD, DD, streaming	—

=== EPs ===
List of extended plays, with selected details
Title	Details
Wolf & Cub	Released: 2004; Label: Dot Dash (DOT002CD); Formats: CD, DD

=== Singles ===
List of singles
Title	Year
"Thousand Cuts"	2004
"Steal Their Gold"	2005
"This Mess"	2007
"March of Clouds"	2007
"Seven Sevens"	2008
"One to the Other"	2008
"See the Light // All Through the Night"	2012

== Awards and nominations ==
In 2006 Wolf & Cub were awarded the Qantas Spirit of Youth award for music. SOYA is an Australian premier youth arts prize, recognising and rewarding outstanding young Australians. The band received a cheque for $5000 and $5000 in Qantas airline tickets.

=== AIR Awards ===
The Australian Independent Record Awards (commonly known informally as AIR Awards) is an annual awards night to recognise, promote and celebrate the success of Australia's Independent Music sector.

Year	Nominee / work	Award	Result	Ref.
2007	Vessels	Best Performing Independent Album	Nominated	
2007	themselves	Best Independent Artist	Nominated	
2008	"One to the Other"	Best Independent Single/EP	Nominated	
2021	Nil	Best Independent Heavy Album or EP	Nominated	
2022	Dusk At The Watagan Forest Motel	Best Independent Heavy Album or EP	Won	

=== ARIA Music Awards ===
The ARIA Music Awards is an annual awards ceremony that recognises excellence, innovation, and achievement across all genres of Australian music.

Year	Nominee / work	Award	Result
2007	Vessels	Best Independent Release	Nominated
