= This Mess =

Single by Wolf & Cub

from the album Vessels
- B-side: "The Death Rattle Shakes", "Chameleon and the Snakes"
- Released: March 13, 2007
- Genre: Psychedelic, funk
- Length: 12:03
- Label: 4AD; Remote Control
- Songwriter(s): Joel Byrne
- Producer(s): Tony Doogan, Matt Hills, Wolf & Cub

Wolf & Cub singles chronology
"This Mess" (2007)	"March of Clouds" (2007)

This Mess is the debut single by Australian band Wolf & Cub, released from their first album, Vessels. The track was featured as iTunes' "Single of the Week" in the first week of August 2006, introducing the band's psychedelic-funk style to a wider audience.

== Track listing ==
iTunes cover.

=== CD ===
BAD 2715CD

1. "This Mess" – 3:52
2. "The Death Rattle Shakes" – 4:29
3. "Chameleon and the Snakes" – 3:42

=== 7" Vinyl ===
AD 2715

1. "This Mess" – 3:52
2. "The Death Rattle Shakes" – 4:29

=== iTunes ===
1. "This Mess" (single edit) – 3:06

== Music video ==
Joel Byrne in "This Mess".

Wolf & Cub's music video for "This Mess" employs kaleidoscopic editing techniques to complement the song's psychedelic sound. The visual symmetry reflects the band's use of dual drummers, creating a mirrored effect that enhances the song's dynamic rhythm.
