= Dave Steel =

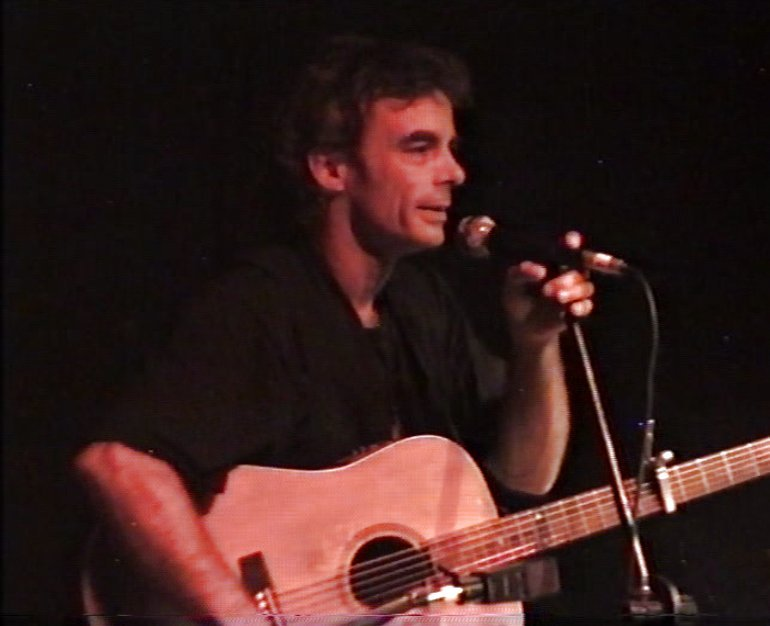
- Steel performing on stage at the Cygnet Folk Festival in 1999

Background information
- Born: David Alexander John Steel; Melbourne, Victoria, Australia
- Genres: Folk; country; rock
- Occupations: Musician; arranger; producer
- Instruments: Guitar; vocals; harmonica; mandolin; dobro
- Years active: 1976–present
- Labels: WEA; Ravenswood; Black Market
- Website: davesteelmusician.tumblr.com

David Alexander John Steel is an Australian singer-songwriter, guitarist and producer. He is a former member of folk rock group, Weddings Parties Anything (1985–88) and pop band, the Whipper Snappers (1990–91). Steel has released eleven solo studio albums, including one as leader of Dave Steel and the Roadside Prophets and two albums with folk singer, Tiffany Eckhardt. He has been nominated for three ARIA Music Awards.

== Career ==
=== 1976-1984: Early bands ===
Early in his musical career Steel was a member of various Melbourne pub bands: Related Mechanics in 1976 with Iain Colquhoun, Peter Lillee, John Lloyd and Nick Reischbeth; Moonshine from 1976 to 1977, the Trouts in 1977 with Mark Bell, Stuart Crosby, Dave McNaughton and Rob Stevens; the Satellites from 1978 to 1981; Zeros in 1981; Strange Tennants in 1981 with Alex Formosa, Lawrence Maddy, Bruce Worrall; and Fire Below from 1984 to 1985.

Fire Below had a line-up of Steel with Lloyd Campbell on guitar, Nigel Harrison on drums and vocals, Michael Kennedy on bass guitar, and Peter Myers on guitar. They issued a single, "Walk Tall", in 1985 and provided a track, "Johnny's Tombstone", for a various artists compilation album, A Slab of Vic, in that year. According to Australian musicologist, Ian McFarlane they, "played a tough brand of pub rock."

=== 1985-1988: Weddings Parties Anything ===
In 1985, Steel, on guitar, vocals and harmonica, joined a newly formed folk rock band, Weddings Parties Anything, alongside Dave Adams on drums; Mick Thomas on lead vocals, bass guitar, guitar and mandolin; Mark Wallace on piano accordion, keyboards and vocals. Steel is recorded on their first two studio albums, Scorn of the Women (April 1987) and Roaring Days (April 1988).

Prior to their second album, Karen Middleton of The Canberra Times, described how the group, "[were] compared to Irish post-punk folk rockers the Pogues, the more mellow Bushwackers and even Redgum. Steel ignored such comparisons. 'It's a rock 'n roll band', he said." Steel wrote the Weddings Party Anything tracks, "Big River", "Shotgun Wedding" and "Up for Air". Steel left in mid-1988 because of strained relations; however, according to AllMusic's Aaron Badgley, it was, "due to exhaustion." He was replaced in the group by Richard Burgman on guitar and saxophone.

=== 1988-1992: Solo career ===
Steel relocated to Sydney, where he recorded his first solo single, "The Hardest Part" which was released in October 1988. At the ARIA Music Awards of 1989 it was nominated for Best Indigenous Release but lost to Weddings Party Anything's Roaring Days.

Steel's debut album, Bitter Street was produced by Graham Bidstrup and released in September 1989. McFarlane observed, "Steel's concise and economical arrangements, narrative style vocal manner drew comparisons with Paul Kelly, albeit in a very positive light." Badgley felt, "most of the songs are well-crafted country/folk/rock, but there is little variety. Steel cannot sustain an entire album on his own... [they] are, for the most part, pretty depressing. Pleasant melodies, but the songs start to sound all the same by the end of the disc."

During 1990 to 1991 he fronted the Dave Steel Band with Bidstrup on drums, Chris Bailey on bass guitar, Wayne Goodwin on fiddle, guitar and keyboards, Peter Howell on bass guitar, Graham Rankin and Dave Sandford on saxophone. He was also a guitarist of pop group, the Whipper Snappers. That line-up provided a cover version of Russell Morris' "Sweet, Sweet Love" (February 1991), which appeared on the various artists' compilation, Used and Recovered By... RRR, in 1993.

In 1991, Steel released his second solo album, Angels Never Cry, with Bidstrup producing again. His bandmates, Bailey and Goodwin, were joined in the studio by Michael Barclay on drums, James Black on keyboards, John Brewster on guitar, Peter Bull on keyboards, Mark Dennison on saxophone, Kevin Dubber on trumpet and Charlie McMahon on didgeridoo.

The Last Radio, Steel's third album, was released in August 1992. Charles Miranda of The Canberra Times noticed, "he shows why he is a respected writer. As with his past offerings, the recording is a blend of acoustic guitar and rhythm and blues." McFarlane observed, "another well-crafted set of songs competently played... It did little, however to further [his] status as one of this country's most promising singer/guitarists."

Also in 1992 Steel formed The Maddisons with Clyde Bramley (ex-the Hitmen, Hoodoo Gurus, Damien Lovelock's Wigworld) on bass guitar, Brent Marks on drums and Wayne Tritton on guitar and lead vocals (both ex-Pressmen). That group released their debut EP, Just Fine, in September with Steel also producing, before they disbanded.

=== 1993-2000s: Solo career and band work ===
In 1993 Steel formed the Dave Steel and the Roadside Prophets with Tritton, Darren Gower on drums and Gerry Kortesgast on bass guitar. They released an album, Cross My Palm in June 1993 and an extended play, Broken English in March 1994. Cross My Palm was nominated for Best Independent Release at the ARIA Music Awards of 1994.

From November 1994 to August 1995 Steel recorded his next album, Old Salt Blues which was released in June 1996. For the album he co-wrote two tracks with Andrew Pendlebury. Steel also toured as a member of the Deadly Band (1995–97) with Archie Cuthbertson, Kerry Gilmartin, Ruby Hunter, Amos Roach and Archie Roach. He worked as a session musician for various artists.

Steel's sixth album, The Edge of the World was released in May 1999 and according to McFarlane "featured a collection of contemporary Australian acoustic roots tunes with plenty of charm". One of his guest musicians was folk singer, Tiffany Eckhardt.

Steel's seventh solo album, Home Is a Hard Thing to Find was released in August 2002 and was nominated for Best Blues & Roots Album at the ARIA Music Awards of 2002.

=== 2010-present: with Tiffany Eckhardt ===
Tiffany Eckhardt and Dave Steel have performed as a duo and released two albums, Sunday (2010) and Big Big Sky (2014). As from January 2015 they are married and live in Franklin, Tasmania with their two children.

Steel was inducted into the EG Fall of Fame in 2012 for his contribution to Australian music as a member of Weddings Parties Anything.

== Discography ==
=== Albums ===
List of albums, with selected chart positions
Title	Album details	Peak chart positions
Title	Album details	AUS
Bitter Street	Released: September 1989; Label: Warner Music Group (256628-1); Format: LP, CD, Cassette	134
Angels Never Cry	Released: June 1991; Label: East West Records (903174299-2); Format: CD	103
The Last Radio	Released: July 1992; Label: Warner Music Australia (450990146-2); Format: CD	175
Cross My Palm (by Dave Steel and the Roadside Prophets)	Released: June 1993; Label: Ravenswood (RV-1004); Format: CD	—
Old Salt Blues	Released: June 1996; Label: Ravenswood (RV-1020); Format: CD	—
The Edge of the World	Released: May 1999; Label: Dave Steel (DS001); Format: CD	—
Home Is a Hard Thing to Find	Released: August 2002; Label: Black Market Music (BM258.2); Format: CD	—
Been On This Road Too Long (As Dave Steel and The Welcome Wagon )	Released: 2004; Label: Sound Vault (SV0433); Format: CD, DD	—
Blues & Ballads	Released: 2007; Label: Sound Vault (SV0543); Format: CD, DD	—
Sunday (with Tiffany Eckhardt)	Released: March 2010; Label: Black Market Music (); Format: CD, DD	—
Big Big Sky (with Tiffany Eckhardt)	Released: 2014; Label: Black Market Music (TECK002); Format: CD	—

=== Extended plays ===
Title	Details
Hard Done by You (with Dave Steel, Peter Wells and Bob Armstrong)	Released: August 1993; Label: Ravenswood (RV-1005); Format: CD
Broken English (Dave Steel and the Roadside Prophets)	Released: 1994; Label: Ravenswood (RV1008); Format: CD

=== Singles ===
List of singles, with selected chart positions
Title	Year	Chart positions	Album
Title	Year	AUS	Album
"The Hardest Part"	1988	—	Bitter Street
"Hurt By You"	1989	162	Bitter Street
"The News"	1990	—	Bitter Street
"Bay of Swans"	1991	165	Angels Never Cry
"Angels Never Cry"	1991	157	Angels Never Cry
"Suzanne"	1992	—	The Last Radio

== Awards and nominations ==
=== ARIA Music Awards ===
The ARIA Music Awards is an annual awards ceremony that recognises excellence, innovation, and achievement across all genres of Australian music. Steel has been nominated for three awards.

Year	Nominee / work	Award	Result
1989	"The Hardest Part"	Best Indigenous Release	Nominated
1994	Cross My Palm	Best Independent Release	Nominated
2002	Home Is a Hard Thing to Find	Best Blues and Roots Album	Nominated

=== The Age EG Awards/Music Victoria Awards ===
The Age EG Awards are an annual awards night celebrating Victorian music. They commenced in 2005. Steel was inducted into its Hall of Fame as part of group Weddings, Parties, Anything.

Year	Nominee / work	Award	Result
2012	(as part of) Weddings, Parties, Anything	Hall of Fame	inductee
