= Weekend (Underground Lovers album) =

Studio album by Underground Lovers
- Released: 5 April 2013
- Genre: Rock
- Length: 46:34
- Label: Rubber
- Producers: Glenn Bennie, Vincent Giarrusso, Wayne Connolly

Underground Lovers chronology
Wonderful Things: Retrospective (2011)	Weekend (2013)

Professional ratings
Review scores
Source	Rating
Herald Sun	4/5 stars
The Age	4/5 stars
Sunday Herald Sun	3.5/5 stars
The Courier-Mail	4.5/5 stars

Weekend is the seventh studio album by Australian indie rock/electronic band Underground Lovers, the band's first after a 12-year hiatus. It followed a reunion for Sydney and Melbourne performances at the 2009 Homebake festival and the release of their 2011 retrospective album, Wonderful Things. A Rubber Records media release said: "This led to sporadic carefully selected shows and the realisation that the band still had something to say."

"The moment we got back together it clicked", lyricist and vocalist Vincent Giarrusso told The Courier-Mail. "We did one rehearsal, we had six or seven song ideas and we went to the studio to record them. The first four songs on the album are from that initial recording and some of those are first takes. The song 'Can For Now', what you are hearing is the first time we played it." The band also reunited with producer Wayne Connolly, producer of their 1997 album Ways T' Burn, to get the guitar sounds they wanted.

Giarrusso said the album was inspired by the energy of director Jean-Luc Godard's 1960s cinema hit Weekend, and Godard's film was used in their video for "Au Pair".

== Track listing ==
(All songs by Underground Lovers, lyrics by Vincent Giarrusso):

1. "Spaces" – 3:41
2. "Can For Now" – 3:17
3. "Haunted (Acedia)" – 4:58
4. "Dream To Me" – 4:42
5. "Signs of Weakness" – 4:15
6. "Riding" – 4:55
7. "St Germain" – 3:50
8. "Au Pair" – 4:22
9. "In Silhouette" – 4:04
10. "The Lie That Sets You Free" – 7:14

== Personnel ==
- Richard Andrew – drums
- Maurice Argiro – bass guitar
- Glenn Bennie – guitar
- Emma Bortignon – bass
- Vincent Giarrusso – vocals, keyboards
- Philippa Nihill – vocals, guitar, keyboard
