= Stella One Eleven =

Australian musical group

- Origin: Sydney, New South Wales, Australia
- Genres: Pop; rock
- Years active: 1997–2005
- Labels: Candle; Wow/MGM; Universal
- Past members: Bowden Campbell; Pat Hayes; Genevieve Maynard; Cindy Ryan; Raphael Wittingham; Brian Cachia; Sam Carter

Stella One Eleven were an Australian pop, rock band, which formed in September 1997. They released three studio albums, Mr Big Car (1999), In Your Hands (2000) and Stella One Eleven (October 2003). Three of the band's singles, "Go Slow Girl" (July 2001), "Out There Somewhere"/"S.S.D." (October 2003) and "She" (March 2004), reached the top 40 on the ARIA Singles Chart. At the ARIA Music Awards of 2001 they were nominated for Best Independent Release and Best Adult Contemporary Album for In Your Hands. At the previous year's ceremony their single, "Only Good for Conversation" (September 1999), was nominated for Best Independent Release. The group had disbanded by October 2005 with the members undertaking solo projects.

== History ==
=== 1997–2002: Formation, Mr Big Car and In Your Hands ===
Stella One Eleven were formed in September 1997 in Sydney when singer-songwriter Cindy Ryan went into a studio to record her debut solo album. While working with her session musicians, Ryan decided to form a pop rock band with them instead. Stella One Eleven's debut single, "Hard", appeared in 1998 and was followed by their first album, Mr Big Car, in 1999 on Candle Records.

The group's line-up was Bowden Campbell (ex-Front End Loader) on guitar, Pat Hayes (ex-Falling Joys) on bass guitar and backing vocals, Genevieve Maynard (ex-Bughouse) on guitar and backing vocals, Ryan on lead vocals and guitar, and Raphael Wittingham (ex-Clouds, Golden Rough) on drums. Most of the album's tracks were co-produced by Maynard with Tim Powles (of the Church); two tracks were produced solely by Maynard.

Additional singles issued from the album are "Mr Big Car" (June 1999), "Only Good for Conversation" (September) and "She Lies" (December). At the ARIA Music Awards of 2000, "Only Good for Conversation", was nominated for Best Independent Release.

Stella One Eleven released their second album, In Your Hands, on Wow Records in late 2000. The line-up was Hayes, Maynard and Ryan with Brian Cachia on drums and Sam Carter (ex-Dogbouy) on guitar. At the ARIA Music Awards of 2001 In Your Hands was nominated for Best Independent Release and Best Adult Contemporary Album.

It generated a top 40 single, "Go Slow Girl" (July 2001), on the ARIA Singles Chart, which was placed on high rotation by national youth radio station, Triple J. The album reached No. 13 on Alternative Albums Chart. The band wrote the theme song for National Youth Week in Australia and were appointed official Youth Week ambassadors for 2000. In October 2001 the group were guest programmers on rage.

=== 2003–2005: Self-titled album to disbandment ===
After a hiatus of two years the group reconvened to release their third studio album, Stella One Eleven, on 6 October 2003. Ryan had collaborated with outside writers including Mark Seymour (of Hunters and Collectors) on "Cold" and Paul Andrews of Lazy Susan on "Paleface" and "Beautiful Boys". It reached number 12 on the ARIA Australasian Artists Albums chart. Lucinda Gardiner of Oz Music Project described it as "an unashamedly pop album that deserves more recognition then it will probably get... Ryan's lyrics are sweeter and more optimistic here than in previous recordings. There is none of the outward vitriol on [it] that is on their other albums."

They issued two singles – "Out There Somewhere"/"S.S.D. (Sweet Sweet Darling)" in October 2003 and "She" (March 2004) – the latter was produced by Paul Mac. Both singles reached the ARIA Singles Chart top 40.

By October 2005 Stella One Eleven had disbanded with both Ryan and Campbell releasing solo albums: Ryan's Love Hate Tattoo and Campbell's Crooked Mile.

== Members ==
- Cindy Ryan – lead vocals and guitar
- Genevieve Maynard – guitar and backing vocals
- Pat Hayes – bass guitar and backing vocals
- Sam Carter – guitar
- Brian Cachia – drums
- Raphael Wittingham – drums (Mr Big Car)
- Bowden Campbell – guitar (Mr Big Car)
- Bernie Hayes – lead vocals
- Mary-Anne Cornford - bass guitar
- Stuart Robertson

== Discography ==
=== Albums ===
List of albums, with selected details
Title	Details
Mr Big Car	Released: 1999; Label: Wow (WOW311); Format: CD
In Your Hands	Released: 2000; Label: Wow (WOW611); Format: CD
Stella One Eleven	Released: October 2003; Label: Wow / MGM (121 1-2); Format: CD

=== Extended plays ===
List of extended plays, with selected details and chart positions
Title	Details	Peak chart positions
Title	Details	AUS
Jump and the Eclectic Acoustic Covers Collection	Released: March 2001; Label: Wow Records/MGM (WOW911); Format: CD	93

=== Singles ===
List of singles, with selected chart positions
Title	Year	Peak chart positions	Album
Title	Year	AUS	Album
"Hard"	1998	100	Mr Big Car
"Mr Big Car"	1999	163	Mr Big Car
"Only Good for Conversation"	1999	192	Mr Big Car
"She Lies"	1999	95	Mr Big Car
"Loose"	2000	—	In Your Hands
"Jump"	2001	—	Jump and the Eclectic Acoustic Covers Collection
"Go Slow Girl"	2001	31	In Your Hands
"Out There Somewhere"/"S.S.D."	2003	33	Stella One Eleven
"She"	2004	36	Stella One Eleven

== Awards and nominations ==
=== ARIA Music Awards ===
The ARIA Music Awards is an annual awards ceremony that recognises excellence, innovation, and achievement across all genres of Australian music. They commenced in 1987.

Year	Nominee / work	Award	Result
2000	"Only Good for Conversation"	Best Independent Release	Nominated
2001	In Your Hands	Best Adult Contemporary Album	Nominated
2001	In Your Hands	Best Independent Release	Nominated
