= Underground Lovers =

Australian band

- Origin: Melbourne, Victoria, Australia
- Genres: Indie rock; shoegaze; electronic
- Years active: 1988–2002, 2009–present
- Labels: 4AD; BMG; Festival; Fiido; Mainstream; Polydor; Reliant; Rubber; Shock; Silvertone; Zomba
- Spinoffs: GB3, Mist & Sea, Raining Ropes
- Spinoff of: GBVG
- Members: Maurice Argiro; Glenn Bennie; Emma Bortignon; Vincent Giarrusso; Philippa Nihill
- Past members: Richard Andrew; Stephen Downes; Andrew Nunns; Derek J. Yuen
- Website: undergroundlovers.bandcamp.com

Underground Lovers (sometimes stylised as undergroundLOVERS) are an Australian pop-rock band whose sound encompasses elements of indie rock, electronic and shoegaze. Founding members Glenn Bennie (guitar, vocals) and Vincent Giarrusso (vocals, guitar, keyboards) formed the group GBVG in 1988. By May 1990 they became Underground Lovers with Richard Andrew (drums), Maurice Argiro (bass guitar), and Philippa Nihill (vocals, guitar and keyboards) joining. At the 1992 ARIA Music Awards the group won Best New Talent for their debut self-titled album from March 1991. Their highest charting studio album, Dream It Down (June 1994), reached the ARIA albums chart top 60. After releasing seven studio albums, they disbanded in 2002. They reformed in 2009 and subsequently issued three more studio albums. Richard Andrew died in October 2024, after being diagnosed with lung cancer.

== History ==
=== 1988–1999 ===
Glenn Bennie and Vincent Giarrusso met in a suburban Melbourne high school during the 1970s. Both musicians credit their careers to Orchestral Manoeuvres in the Dark (OMD) and the album Architecture & Morality (1981); they were also influenced by Joy Division, New Order, the Cure and the local underground electronic and experimental music scenes. While later studying drama at university, they formed a music duo called GBVG, and released a single, "Blast", in 1988. Australian music journalist Ed Nimmervoll praised how well "Glenn's striking hypnotic guitar atmospheres balanced against Vince's acute pop sense."

New members Richard Andrew, Stephen Downes, and Philippa Nihill were recruited throughout 1989, and by the end of the year, they had changed the name of the group to Underground Lovers, borrowing from the title of an Italian surrealist play. Their first gig, in May 1990, was at the Corner Hotel in Richmond, supporting the Macguffins. Maurice Argiro, formerly of No Nonsense, replaced Downes on bass guitar after the first show.

The members of Underground Lovers self-financed the recording of their self-titled debut album, with producer Simon Grounds; it was picked up by the independent record label Shock Records, and released nationally in March 1991. Australian musicologist Ian McFarlane noted that the record contained "melancholy guitar pop ('Girl Afraid', 'Wasted'), rhythmic dance pop ('Yes I Do', 'Round and Round') and reflective, acoustic folk ('My American Accent')." Two singles were released from the album: "Round and Round" in February and "Looking for Rain" in April. In November, they issued a new non-album single, "Lick the Boot", which was their first release in the United Kingdom. With hype for the band beginning to grow outside of Australia, Shock released a new version of the album for the UK and United States markets, changing the title to Get to Notice (the name of the opening track) and replacing the penultimate track ("Ascend Up") with "Lick the Boot".

The band finished out 1991 with the release of a four-track EP of new material called Nice, as well as an exclusive track, "Ripe", on rooArt's Youngblood 3 compilation album. Beat magazine selected Nice as their single of the week, describing it as "pop rich in all the right ingredients" and "awesome". Bevan Hannan of The Canberra Times wrote that "Nice G.I.", which dealt with "the early stages of the Gulf War about the commandos orchestrating the bombing of Iraq," was the "outstanding cut" from the EP. Hannan also praised "Ripe" as "by far the best" track on Youngblood 3.

In January 1992, the group entered the studio to record their second album, this time with Bennie and Giarrusso co-producing with Wayne Connolly (of the Welcome Mat). At the ARIA Music Awards of 1992 in March, they won the Best New Artist award for Underground Lovers; it had also been nominated for Best Independent Release. The second album, Leaves Me Blind, was a more layered and experimental work. It was first released in August in the UK by the short-lived 4AD sublabel Guernica.; by that stage, Polydor had signed the group for the rest of the world, and released Leaves Me Blind locally in December. Mathieson described them as "so far ahead of their contemporaries that they passed over the horizon, borne on a rolling sea of sound that would become their signature." Over the following year, three singles were released: "Ladies Choice", "I Was Right", and "Your Eyes". Mathieson called the latter track a "telling example of their refusal to be contained... The focus is on the bedroom, one person looking into the eyes of another, as the bassline dips and rises like a heart beginning to race with excitement." Underground Lovers also supported both the Cure and My Bloody Valentine on their respective Australian tours in 1992.

The band spent the first half of 1993 on a tour of North America and the UK, including a performance at 4AD's prestigious 13 Year Itch festival in July. Upon returning home, they commenced production on their third album, first enlisting two former members of Essendon Airport, David Chesworth and Robert Goodge, to handle rhythm and keyboard programming, as well as co-production along with engineers Connolly and Grounds. During the recording, Andrew was replaced on drums by Derek Yuen. Dream It Down was released in June 1994, bookended by two singles, "Las Vegas" and "Losin' It". Praised as "lush and atmospheric", the album became the band's first to make the top 60 on the ARIA Albums Chart. "Losin' It" reached the ARIA Singles Chart top 100, and received high rotation on national youth radio, Triple J, eventually landing on the station's year-end chart at No. 19. A third song, "Beautiful World", was released the next year as the lead track from a four-song EP called Splendid.

Seeking greater artistic freedom, the band parted ways with Polydor in 1995 and set up their own indie label, Mainstream Recordings, in conjunction with a larger indie, Rubber Records. Their fourth album, Rushall Station, was named after Rushall railway station, located near Giarrusso's home in Clifton Hill. Released in April 1996, the album showcased the band taking "a minimalist approach". Philippa Nihill amicably parted ways with the band during the recording of the album, though she recorded vocals for two tracks, and remained with Mainstream for the release of her debut solo EP, Dead Sad, later that year. The album earned Underground Lovers another nomination for Best Independent Release at the 1997 ARIA Awards. 1997 also saw the release of two new albums: first, Bennie and Giarrusso revived their original duo project, GBVG, putting out a debut album titled Whitey Trickstar; the fifth Underground Lovers album, Ways t'Burn, was released in June. The latter saw a move towards more electronic territory, and Derek Yuen departed during the recording sessions, later to be replaced by Autohaze drummer Andrew Nunns.

Bennie and Giarrusso maintained a low profile for much of 1998, releasing only a GBVG cover of Can's "I Want More". The vocals were credited to a Japanese chanteuse named "Mitsuame", who in reality was Triple J DJ and Recovery co-host Jane Gazzo. Maurice Argiro left the band at the end of 1998, leaving the core duo of Bennie and Giarrusso to ready their sixth album. Cold Feeling again showed the increasing influence of electronica on the group's music, and featured contributions from other Melburnian musicians, including the Paradise Motel's Mérida Sussex and ex-Triffids pedal steel guitarist Graham Lee. The title track received considerable airplay on Triple J, and new bassist Emma Bortignon joined up with the band in time to appear on the b-sides to the second single, "Infinite Finite".

=== 2000–present ===
Rubber Records released the live album Evil. Underground Lovers 94.97, a compilation of live tracks sourced from various gigs during 1994–1997. Meanwhile, Giarrusso concentrated mainly on finalising his feature film debut, Mallboy, which he wrote and directed. Inspired by Giarrusso's early career as a social worker, the film focused on a troubled youth (played by Kane McNay of SeaChange fame) and his dysfunctional lifestyle in Melbourne's northern suburbs. The film premiered during the 2000 Cannes Film Festival, where it was selected for the highly-prestigious Director's Fortnight slot, becoming only the fifth Australian film to have ever been selected at that time. It later premiered in Australia at the closing night of the 2001 Melbourne International Film Festival, and had a limited release in cinemas soon after through Buena Vista International. McNay's performance earned an AFI Award for Best Actor. Bennie and Giarrusso also composed and recorded the score for Mallboy, which was released as the seventh Underground Lovers album in 2001. Newer material was previewed by the band at concerts later that year, but none was ever released. After playing shows supporting New Order during their Australian tour in January 2002, the band quietly took an extended break.

The early-1990s lineup of Underground Lovers reformed for an appearance at the Homebake Festival in Sydney on 5 December 2009. The band had expanded to a sextet with Andrew, Argiro, Bennie, Bortignon, Giarrusso and Nihill. In conjunction with the reunion, Rubber Records re-released their debut album and post-1996 output digitally on iTunes that November. A warm-up show occurred on 1 November at Toff in Town hotel, Melbourne followed by shows in Sydney and Melbourne in December. In October 2010, Mathieson and fellow music writers and critics John O'Donnell and Toby Creswell listed Leaves Me Blind as the 54th greatest Australian album in their book, 100 Best Australian Albums. The band opened for Primal Scream on their Melbourne shows in February 2011, and also supported Mark Gardener (formerly of Ride) on his Australian tour in 2012.

Underground Lovers' next album, Weekend, was released in April 2013, featuring the mix of energetic rock and electronica. Weekend was created with longtime studio collaborators Connolly and mix engineer Tim Whitten along with a new addition, recording engineer Tim Prince. The 6-piece version of the band continued to play some shows around Australia each year while maintaining their relationship with Rubber Records, having released two more albums, Staring at You Staring at Me in 2017 and A Left Turn in 2019, plus two compilations: one of remixes (Shadows) and one of b-sides (Others).

Early in 2023 Bennie and Giarrusso created a spin-off group Underground Lovers Moda Discoteca (ULMD) with Argiro, Matthew Sigley (the Earthmen, the Lovetones, Greenhouse) and Mat Watson (Free Fields, Other Places, Taipan Tiger Girls). They played shows in Melbourne and Sydney, providing "electronically infused" versions of Underground Lovers' material. ULMD returned for another show in December of that year. In August 2024 ULMD announced they were due to support United Kingdom visitors OMD on their February 2025 Australian tour. Drummer Richard John Andrew (16 August 1966 – 30 October 2024) died, at the age of 58, after being diagnosed with lung cancer. He was survived by his wife.

== Related projects ==
After their break up in 2002 Glenn Bennie began an ongoing solo project, GB3, in 2003 with collaborator Tim Prince and various vocalists or musicians, which has included Philippa Nihill. Rubber Records released GB3's albums, Circlework (October 2003) and Emptiness Is Our Business(August 2006). The latter used more collaborators, Sarah Blasko, Steve Kilbey, Stephen Cummings, Grant McLennan, ex-Frente! vocalist Angie Hart, Sianna Lee from Love Outside Andromeda, and Adalita from Magic Dirt. Their third album, Damaged/Controlled (2010), was co-written and recorded with Kilbey, while Nihill provided vocals for "Nectarine", which was promoted by an animated video, created by Maurice Argiro.

Vincent Giarrusso created a new band, Mist and Sea in 2007 with Cailan Burns and Jason Sweeney of Pretty Boy Crossover. Their album, Unless, was released by Popfrenzy in July 2007. Giarrusso also performed live, at that time, with another band, Raining Ropes, alongside former members of Bergerac and the Paradise Motel, but they issued no recordings. In 2009, Giarrusso performed two shows in Melbourne with a group, Underground Lovers in LA, which included bassist Todd Hutchinson, cellist and keyboardist Zoe Barry, guitarist Jed Palmer and drummer Steve Griffiths from the Hope Diamond. They provided a selection of Underground Lovers material.

Philippa Nihill released her debut EP in 1996 and followed with a studio album, A Little Easy (2000). She also collaborated with Irish singer and filmmaker Paula Kehoe in a duo, Saoi which issued an album, This Drowning Is Dreaming, in December 2006. Nihill's second solo album is Find Her Way (2023). In January 2025 Bernie issued a solo album, Juno Low. Arun Kendall of Backseat Mafia observed, "[it's] filled with shimmering guitars and a motorik beat, delivering melodic pieces that are luminescent and grand, creating a sense of euphoria with its vibrant pulse."

== Members ==
Current members

- Maurice Argiro – bass guitar (1990–1998, 2009–present)
- Glenn Bennie – guitar, vocals (1988–2002, 2009–present)
- Emma Bortignon – bass (1998–2002, 2009–present)
- Vincent Giarrusso – vocals, guitar, keyboard (1988–2002, 2009–present)
- Philippa Nihill – vocals, guitar and keyboard (1989–1996, 2009–present)

Past members

- Richard Andrew – drums (1990–1994, 2009–2024; died 2024)
- Stephen Downes – bass (1990)
- Andrew Nunns – drums (1997–2002)
- Derek J. Yuen – drums (1994–1997)

== Discography ==
=== Studio albums ===
List of studio albums, with selected details and chart positions
Title	Details	Peak positions
Title	Details	AUS
Underground Lovers/Get to Notice	Release date: March 1991; Label: Shock (SHOCK CD 005); Formats: CD, cassette, LP	—
Leaves Me Blind	Release date: August 1992; Label: Guernica, Polydor (517 436–2); Formats: CD, cassette, LP	133
Dream It Down	Release date: June 1994; Label: Polydor (521 987–2); Formats: CD, cassette	55
Rushall Station	Release date: April 1996; Label: Mainstream Recordings (Main CD 001); Formats: CD	107
Ways T'Burn	Release date: July 1997; Label: Mainstream, BMG (74321580772); Formats: CD	109
Cold Feeling	Release date: February 1999; Label: Reliant Records (NC170001); Formats: CD	92
Mallboy	Release date: January 2001; Label: Silvertone Records (SILV011); Formats: CD	—
Weekend	Release date: 2013; Label: Rubber (RUB281); Formats: CD, LP, digital	—
Staring at You Staring at Me	Release date: 2017; Label: Rubber (RUB300); Formats: CD, LP, digital	—
A Left Turn	Release date: 2019; Label: Rubber (RUB325); Formats: CD, LP, digital	—

=== Compilation albums ===
Title	Details
Evil. Underground Lovers 94.97	Release date: 2000; Label: Rubber (TRS2005); Formats: CD
Wonderful Things: Retrospective	Release date: November 2011; Label: Rubber (RUB262); Formats: CD, digital
Shadows	Release date: 2020; Label: none; Formats: digital
Others	Release date: 2021; Label: none; Formats: digital

=== Charting singles ===
List of singles, with selected chart positions (to top 200), showing year released and album name
Title	Year	Peak chart positions		Album
Title	Year	AUS	US Dance	Album
"I Was Right"	1992	174	-	Leaves Me Blind
"Promenade"	1993	140	-	Leaves Me Blind
"Your Eyes"	1993	134	-	Leaves Me Blind
"Las Vegas"	1994	118	-	Dream It Down
"Losin' It"	1994	93	36	Dream It Down
"The Splendid"	1995	138	-	Rushall Station
"In My Head"	1996	157	-	Rushall Station
"Star Signs"	1997	169	-	Ways T'Burn
"Cold Feelings"	1998	194	-	Cold Feeling

=== Other appearances ===
- "Ripe" on Young Blood 3 (rooArt, 1991)
- "I'll Be Your Mirror" on The Velvet Down Underground (Birdland, 1992)
- "Get to Notice" on Screaming at the Mirror Three (Giggle Records, 1992)

== Awards and nominations ==
=== APRA Awards ===
The APRA Awards are presented annually from 1982 by the Australasian Performing Right Association (APRA), "honouring composers and songwriters". They commenced in 1982.

Year	Nominee / work	Award	Result	Ref.
2020	"Seven Day Weekend" (Richard Andrew / Maurice Argiro / Glenn Bennie / Vincent Giarrusso / Phillipa Nihill)	Song of the Year	Shortlisted	

=== ARIA Music Awards ===
The ARIA Music Awards is an annual awards ceremony that recognises excellence, innovation, and achievement across all genres of Australian music. They commenced in 1987. Underground Lovers won one award.

Year	Nominee / work	Award	Result	Ref.
1992	Underground Lovers	Best New Talent	Won	
1992	Underground Lovers	Best Independent Release	Nominated	
1996	Rushall Station	Best Independent Release	Nominated	
