= Wolf & Cub (EP) =

EP by Wolf & Cub
- Released: 1 November 2004
- Recorded: April 2004
- Genre: Psychedelic
- Length: 21:57
- Label: Dot Dash
- Producer: Matt Hills, Wolf & Cub

Wolf & Cub chronology
Wolf & Cub (2004)	Steal Their Gold (2005)

Wolf & Cub was the first extended play released in November 2004 by Australian psychedelic rock group, Wolf & Cub, via Dot Dash Recordings. It has five tracks, including "Thousand Cuts". The group's line-up was Joel Byrne on lead vocals and guitar, Joel Carey on percussion, Adam Edwards on drums and percussion, and Thomas Mayhew on bass guitar. It was co-produced by the band with Matt Hills in April that year with Byrne writing all the tracks.

== Track listing ==
All tracks are written by Joel Byrne

No.	Title	Length
1.	"Targets"	4:25
2.	"Thousand Cuts"	2:08
3.	"Poison Fang"	6:02
4.	"Spirals"	2:55
5.	"Hands Go Down"	6:22
