= Salt (Angie McMahon album) =

Studio album by Angie McMahon
- Released: 26 July 2019
- Recorded: 2017–2019
- Studio: Melbourne, Victoria, Australia
- Length: 48:39
- Label: Angie McMahon
- Producer: Alex O'Gorman, Angie McMahon

Angie McMahon chronology
Salt (2019)	Piano Salt (2020)

Singles from Salt
- 1. "Slow Mover" Released: 9 October 2017; 2. "Missing Me" Released: 26 February 2018; 3. "Keeping Time" Released: 18 July 2018; 4. "Pasta" Released: 7 March 2019; 5. "And I am a Woman" Released: 21 June 2019

Salt is the debut studio album by Australian singer-songwriter Angie McMahon. The album was released in July 2019. The album was supported by an national tour in October 2019.

At the ARIA Music Awards of 2019, the album was nominated for Best Independent Release. At the Music Victoria Awards 2019, the album was nominated for Best Album. At the AIR Awards of 2020, the album won Best Independent Rock Album or EP.

== Critical reception ==
Professional ratings
Review scores
Source	Rating
AllMusic	3/5 stars
The AU Review	5/5 stars
Beat Magazine	9.5/10 stars

Salt was named Album of the Year by Beat Magazine. Reviewer Eddy Lim said, "While Salt is primarily driven by deft guitar work and a tight rhythm section, it's McMahon's stunning vocal performance that unequivocally captures the spotlight," adding, "Her stunning vocal range takes notes from K.D. Lang, Florence Welch and Lucy Rose with a timbre that sporadically oscillates between husky intimacy and cathartic clamour."

Dylan Marshall from The AU Review said, "Angie McMahon is a tour-de-force, an artist demanding to be listened to and heard. She is a musician second, and a human first. She's put her lived experiences into these tracks. There's a special sentiment to be gained there. Salt is an album that in ten years time will be looked back on as being pivotal in the shaping of so many artists."

Kayleigh Hughes from Consequence of Sound said, "Salt exhibits McMahon's lyrical prowess time and time again." adding "For those who are feeling lost and needing to really listen, Salt will speak loud."

Laura Stanley from Exclaim said, "The songs are anchored by McMahon's electric guitar, which she pounds or softly strums, depending on how she's feeling. Often, McMahon's songs start quietly and slowly, but steadily bloom into riotous rock tracks. At their boisterous peak, McMahon has a grand realization or admits something difficult" calling the album "a confident debut".

== Track listing ==
Salt track listing
No.	Title	Writer(s)	Length
1.	"Play the Game"	McMahon	4:10
2.	"Soon"	McMahon	3:43
3.	"Keeping Time"	McMahon	3:31
4.	"Slow Mover"	McMahon	3:10
5.	"Missing Me"	McMahon	3:19
6.	"Push"	McMahon	4:51
7.	"Pasta"	McMahon	4:38
8.	"Standout"	McMahon	4:37
9.	"Mood Song"	McMahon	4:18
10.	"And I Am a Woman"	McMahon	4:43
11.	"If You Call"	McMahon	7:41
Total length:			48:39

== Charts ==
Chart performance for Salt
Chart (2019)	Peak position
Australian Albums (ARIA)	5

== Release history ==
Release history and formats for Salt
Region	Date	Format	Label	Catalogue
Australia	26 July 2019	CD; digital download; streaming; vinyl LP	Angie McMahon	AM001CD / AM001LP
Europe	July 2019	digital download; streaming; vinyl LP	AWAL	803020197411
United States	July 2019	CD; digital download; streaming; vinyl LP	Dualtone	803020197411
