= Keeping Time (song) =

Single by Angie McMahon

from the album Salt
- Released: 18 July 2018
- Length: 3:31
- Label: Angie McMahon
- Songwriter(s): Angie McMahon

Angie McMahon singles chronology
| "Missing Me" (2018) | "Keeping Time" (2018) | "Helpless" (2018) |

"Keeping Time" is a song written and performed by Australian singer Angie McMahon. The song was released in July 2018 as the third single from McMahon's debut studio album Salt (2019). The song was certified gold in Australia in 2023.

The song premiered on triple j with McMahon saying, "I wrote it a while back thinking about diving into this music career thing and having the confidence to do that amidst all my insecurities - feeling like everyone was a better musician than me. This song is about pushing that stuff aside... Like, 'you can do this, you know how to play music, just get over yourself and do it!'"."

The music video was released in March 2019.

== Reception ==
Triple J said "Built upon an openly inviting chord pattern and a rough strut, Angie's voice is plump with feeling yet glides in satin-smooth phrases."

== Certifications ==
| Region | Certification | Certified units/sales |
|---|---|---|
| Australia (ARIA) | Gold | 35,000^{‡} |
^{‡} Sales+streaming figures based on certification alone.
