= Rockin' Bethlehem =

Rockin' Bethlehem is a 1989 compilation album. It has 14 Christmas songs recorded by independent Australian bands. The songs are mostly original while others are well known Christmas carols. It was created by Timberyard Records to support the Camperdown Children's Hospital. It received a 1990 ARIA Award nomination for Best Independent Release.

== Track listing ==
1. Johnny Teen & The Broken Hearts – "Dear Santa"
2. Dubrovniks – "Bah Humbugger"
3. The Whipper Snappers – "The Christmas Song"
4. The Interstellar Villains – "Christmas Chimes (Are Here Already)"
5. Ratcat – "A Christmas Lullaby"
6. Girl Monstar – "Dead By Christmas"
7. Chris Klondike Masuak – "It's Christmas Time Again"
8. Happy Hate Me Nots – "Jesus Christ"
9. Steve Kilbey – "Spirit of Christmas Yet To Come"
10. Box The Jesuit – "The Beard and the Buckle"
11. The Plunderers – "24 Days Til Biscuits"
12. Damien Lovelock's Wig World – "Sleigh Ride"
13. The Jackson Code – "Have Yourself a Merry Little Christmas"
14. Lime Spiders – "Children of the Sun"
