= Slow Mover =

Single by Angie McMahon

from the album Salt
- Released: 9 October 2017
- Length: 3:10
- Label: Angie McMahon
- Songwriter(s): Angie McMahon
- Producer(s): John Castle

Angie McMahon singles chronology
"Slow Mover" (2017)	"Missing Me" (2018)

"Slow Mover" is a song written and performed by Australian singer Angie McMahon. The song was released in October 2017 as McMahon's debut single and lead from her debut studio album Salt (2019). The song was certified gold in Australia in 2019 and platinum in 2021.

Upon release, McMahon said "'Slow Mover' is a song about putting energy into things that are worthwhile, and taking plenty of time to get to a good place. I'd spent a lot of time pining after love, but at this point my head was shifting, and what I actually wanted and needed was to pursue my music career."

The song polled at number 33 on the Triple J Hottest 100, 2017.

At the APRA Music Awards of 2019, the song was nominated for the "Rock Work of the Year" and "Song of the Year".

== Reception ==
Forte Magazine said "With a deep sound reminiscent of London Grammar, and upbeat summer anthem vibe, this new track is an easy listen."

Joseph Earp from The Brag called the song "an extraordinarily elegant and intelligent song about indecision and the aching desire to be kinder. The song is a stunning work – a compact piece of art, so sharp it could draw blood."

== Track listing ==
- Digital download
1. "Slow Mover" – 3:10

== Certifications ==
Region	Certification	Certified units/sales
Australia (ARIA)	2× Platinum	140,000^{‡}
^{‡} Sales+streaming figures based on certification alone.

== Release history ==
Country	Date	Format	Label
Australia	9 October 2017	Digital download	Angie McMahon
