= Cold Feeling =

Studio album by Underground Lovers
- Released: January 1999
- Recorded: Birdland
- Genre: Rock
- Length: 52:50
- Label: Reliant Records
- Producers: Glenn Bennie, Vincent Giarrusso

Underground Lovers chronology
Ways T'Burn (1997)	Cold Feeling (1999)	Mallboy (2001)

Professional ratings
Review scores
Source	Rating
Daily Telegraph	3/5 stars
Herald Sun	3/5 stars
Sunday Herald Sun	3/5 stars

Cold Feeling is the sixth album by Australian indie rock/electronic band Underground Lovers. It was released in 1999, and peaked at #92 on the ARIA albums chart in March 1999.

The band comprised just original members Glenn Bennie and Vincent Giarrusso but the album also featured contributions by Matt Bailey and Mérida Sussex of The Paradise Motel, ex-Triffids pedal steel guitarist Graham Lee, minimalist producer/performer David Chesworth, as well as cellist Helen Mountfort and violinist Hope Csutoros from My Friend the Chocolate Cake and Robert Tickner and Jim Yamouridis, former members of Melbourne band A Bunch of Lonesome Losers.

On Cold Feeling, the band "approximated something similar" to the 1981 album Architecture & Morality by Orchestral Manoeuvres in the Dark.

Two singles, "Cold Feeling" (November 1998) and "Infinite Finite", were lifted from the album.

== Track listing ==
(All songs by Glenn Bennie and Vincent Giarrusso)

1. "Cold Feeling" – 6:04
2. "You Put Me In Your Movie" – 3:17
3. "A Fools Song" – 2:22
4. "Pauline In The City" – 7:38
5. "Excerpt From 'A Winters Day' " – 4:40
6. "Infinite Finite" – 7:47
7. "Towards The Skies" – 3:32
8. "Feels So Good To Be Free" – 5:39
9. "Lucky Strike" – 1:40
10. "Worrier God" – 6:52

== Personnel ==
- Glenn Bennie – guitar
- Vincent Giarrusso – vocals, keyboards

Additional musicians

- Mérida Sussex – vocals ("You Put Me In Your Movie", "Towards The Skies")
- Matt Bailey – bass guitar ("Pauline In The City", "Infinite Finite")
- David Chesworth – keyboards
- Graham Lee– pedal steel
- Robert Tickner – backing vocals ("Excerpt From A Winters Day", "Worrier God")
- Andrew Nunns – drums ("Infinite Finite")
- Jim Yamourdis – guitar ("A Fools Song")
- Helen Mountfort – cello
- Hope Csutoros – violin

== Charts ==
Chart performance for Cold Feeling
Chart (1999)	Peak position
Australian Albums (ARIA)	92
