= Leaves Me Blind =

Studio album by Underground Lovers
- Released: August 1992 (UK); December 1992 (Australia)
- Recorded: Paradise Studios, Sydney
- Genre: Indie rock
- Length: 51:03
- Label: Guernica (UK); Polydor (Australia)
- Producer: Wayne Connolly, Glenn Bennie, Vincent Giarrusso

Underground Lovers chronology
Underground Lovers (1991)	Leaves Me Blind (1992)	Dream It Down (1994)

Professional ratings
Review scores
Source	Rating
AllMusic	2.5/5 stars
Herald Sun	7/10 stars

Leaves Me Blind is the second album by Australian indie rock/electronic band Underground Lovers, released in the UK in August 1992 and Australia in December. It was the first album released as part of a recording contract with the Polydor label. Three singles, "Ladies Choice" (August 1992) "I Was Right" (November 1992) and a remix of "Your Eyes" (August 1993) were taken from the album.

The band included surging, 15-minute versions of "Your Eyes" as part of their 35-minute sets supporting The Cure on their eight-date Australian tour in August 1992.

A version of "Whisper Me Nothing" by Underground Lovers featuring Stephen Cummings on vocals appeared on Cummings' 1994 CD single "September 13" .

In 2010, music writers and critics John O'Donnell, Toby Creswell and Craig Mathieson named Leaves Me Blind as the 54th greatest Australian album in their book 100 Best Australian Albums.

== Track listing ==
(All music by Glenn Bennie and Vincent Giarrusso, all lyrics by Vincent Giarrusso, except where noted)

1. "Eastside Stories" (Maurice Argiro, Glenn Bennie, Vincent Giarrusso) – 7:09
2. "Promenade" – 4:31
3. "I Was Right" (Maurice Argiro, Glenn Bennie, Vincent Giarrusso) – 4:18
4. "Holiday" – 3:43
5. "Got Off On It" (Maurice Argiro, Glenn Bennie, Vincent Giarrusso, Richard Andrew, Philippa Nihill) – 4:01
6. "Daze" – 2:14
7. "Waves" – 2:55
8. "Your Eyes" – 8:29
9. "Ladies Choice" – 9:16
10. "Get To Know" – 2:09
11. "Whisper Me Nothing" – 2:17

== Personnel ==
- Glenn Bennie – guitars, drums
- Vincent Giarrusso – vocals
- Maurice Argiro — bass
- Philippa Nihill — vocals
- Richard Andrew — drums

Technical personnel

- Wayne Connolly — recording engineer

== Charts ==
Chart performance for Leaves Me Blind
Chart (1992)	Peak position
Australian Albums (ARIA)	133
