= Science and Sorcery (album) =

Studio album by Wolf & Cub
- Released: 18 April 2009 in Australia
- Recorded: 2008–2009
- Genre: Psychedelic, funk

Singles from Science and Sorcery
- 1. "One to the Other" Released: 7 May 2008; 2. "Seven Sevens" Released: 27 November 2008

Professional ratings
Review scores
Source	Rating
Time Out Sydney	4/5 stars

Science and Sorcery is the second full-length album to come from the psychedelic rock group Wolf & Cub. The album was released on 18 April 2009.

A preview of the album can be found on Wolf & Cub's MySpace, https://www.myspace.com/wolfandcub.

== Track listing ==
1. "Seven Sevens"
2. "What Are They Running"
3. "One to the Other"
4. "Master"
5. "Spider's Web"
6. "Restless Sons"
7. "Hearts"
8. "The Loosest of Gooses (Go on Your Own)"
9. "Blood"
10. "Burden"
11. "Tama Swing Soul" (bonus track, iTunes extended version)
