= Ways T'Burn =

Studio album by Underground Lovers
- Released: 23 June 1997
- Recorded: Birdland
- Genre: Rock
- Length: 39:54
- Label: Mainstream/Rubber Records
- Producer: Glenn Bennie, Vincent Giarrusso

Underground Lovers chronology
Rushall Station (1996)	Ways T'Burn (1997)	Cold Feeling (1999)

Professional ratings
Review scores
Source	Rating
The Age	3/5 stars
The Daily Telegraph	8/10 stars
Herald Sun	3.5/5 stars

Ways T'Burn is the fifth album by the Australian indie rock/electronic band Underground Lovers, released in 1997.

Two singles were released from the album—"Starsigns" (June 1997) and "From 'Jumbled in the Common Box'" (November 1997).

== Track listing ==
(All songs by Glenn Bennie and Vincent Giarrusso except where noted)

1. "All Is Quiet" – 3:04
2. "Starsigns" – 3:25
3. "Take a Piece of Cake" – 2:57
4. "She Thinks Her Revenge" – 4:18
5. "From 'Jumbled in the Common Box' " (lyrics adapted from poem by W. H. Auden) – 3:10
6. "Under the Microscope" – 2:41
7. "Ways To Burn" – 4:48
8. "On the Way Home" – 4:31
9. "Las Vegas Lullaby" – 2:31
10. "Excerpt from 'Seven' " (David Chesworth, Robert Goodge) – 0:42
11. "I Feel So Cold" – 7:35

== Personnel ==
- Glenn Bennie – guitar
- Vincent Giarrusso – vocals, keyboards, drums
- Maurice Argiro – bass

Additional musicians

- Derek J. Yuen — drums ("Take a Piece of Cake", "Las Vegas Lullaby", "I Feel So Cold")
- Philippa Nihill — Hammond organ ("She Thinks Her Revenge")
- Richard Andrew — drums ("She Thinks Her Revenge")
- Tim Howden — violin ("Ways To Burn")
- Peter Knight — trumpets ("Las Vegas Lullaby")
- Mal Pinkerton — cello ("Las Vegas Lullaby")

== Charts ==
Chart performance for Ways T'Burn
Chart (1997)	Peak position
Australian Albums (ARIA)	109
