= Dream It Down =

Studio album by Underground Lovers
- Released: June 1994
- Recorded: January 1993 to January 1994
- Genre: Indie rock
- Length: 49:10
- Label: Polydor
- Producer: Glenn Bennie, Vincent Giarrusso, Wayne Connolly, David Chesworth, Robert Goodge, Simon Grounds

Underground Lovers chronology
Leaves Me Blind (1992)	Dream It Down (1994)	Rushall Station (1996)

Singles from Album
- 1. "Las Vegas" Released: 1994; 2. "Losin' It" Released: 1994

Professional ratings
Review scores
Source	Rating
Herald Sun	3.5/5 stars

Dream It Down is the third album by Australian indie rock/electronic band Underground Lovers, released in 1994. It was the second and final album released as part of a recording contract with the Polydor label and was named Australian album of the year by Triple J. Two singles, "Las Vegas" (May 1994) and "Losin' It" (August 1994) were taken from the album.

== Background ==
Songwriter Vincent Giarrusso said the band wanted the album to be markedly different from its predecessor. "Leaves Me Blind had a desperate feel to it," he said. "With this new album we wanted to make the point that you can be subversive and confronting by softer means—that's even more powerful than being smacked over the head with drum rolls and guitars going the whole time."

The album was originally recorded in January 1993, but the band, unhappy with the result, teamed with part of the Filthy Lucre production team—Robert Goodge and David Chesworth, formerly of Melbourne electronic band Essendon Airport, and Simon Polinski—to re-construct the songs with a combination of re-recordings, overdubs and editing. Songwriter Vincent Giarrusso said: "We went with David and Robert because we were comfortable with what they could do. They knew how to take the songs to where we wanted to get them. David is an amazing musician; classical, adventurous. Robert is great at showbiz." Bennie said the extra work on production had come at a cost: "It was a lot more frustrating to get the parts right, whereas on Leaves me Blind we went for a lot of first takes."

The album also marked the arrival of Derek Yuen in the band, replacing original drummer Richard Andrew, who went on to join Sydney band Crow.

== Track listing ==
(All songs by Glenn Bennie and Vincent Giarrusso except where noted)

1. "Dream it Down" – 4:32
2. "Losin' It" (Bennie, Giarrusso, David Chesworth, Robert Goodge) – 5:03
3. "Recognise" – 8:05
4. "Blues Team (Only Thinkin')" – 2:32
5. "Superstar" – 3:27
6. "Supernova" – 3:03
7. "Las Vegas" (Maurice Argiro, Bennie, Giarrusso) – 5:31
8. "Va Va Va Va" – 2:54
9. "Weak Will" (Bennie, Giarrusso, Chesworth, Goodge) – 5:31
10. "Beautiful World" – 3:57
11. "Earth Manna" (Argiro, Bennie, Giarrusso) – 4:33

== Personnel ==
- Glenn Bennie – guitars, drums
- Vincent Giarrusso – vocals
- Maurice Argiro — bass
- Derek John Yuen — drums
- Philippa Nihill — vocals

Additional musicians

- Robert Goodge — keyboard programming ("Losin' It", "Las Vegas", "Weak Will")
- Helen Mountfort — cello ("Losin' It", "Superstar", "Supernova", "Las Vegas", "Earth Manna")
- Hope Csutoros — violin ("Losin' It", "Superstar", "Supernova", "Las Vegas")
- Richard Andrew — drums ("Dream It Down", "Recognise", "Earth Manna")
- Amanda Brown — violin ("Blues Team (Only Thinkin')", "Beautiful World", "Earth Manna")
- Paul Williamson — tenor and baritone sax ("Las Vegas")
- Simon Meyers — trombone ("Las Vegas")
- David Chesworth — piano ("Las Vegas"), keyboard programming ("Weak Will")
- Wayne Connolly — acoustic and electric guitar ("Va Va Va Va"), backing vocals ("Earth Manna")

Technical personnel

- Wayne Connolly — recording engineer
- Robert Goodge — recording engineer
- Simon Grounds — recording engineer, additional recording and overdubs
- Chris Corr — recording engineer, additional recording and overdubs

== Charts ==
Chart performance for Dream It Down
Chart (1994)	Peak position
Australian Albums (ARIA)	55
