= The Whipper Snappers =

Australian pop band

- Also known as: WhipperSnappers
- Origin: Sydney
- Genres: Pop
- Years active: 1986 - 1993
- Members: Annette Crowe; Joy Howard; Tim Eaton; Frank Zaknich

The Whipper Snappers is an Australian pop band. Based in Sydney, the band was formed in 1986 by Annette Crowe, Joy Howard, Tim Eaton and Frank Zaknich. They released their debut single in 1988 and the next year played a cover of "Stairway To Heaven" on The Money or the Gun. Later that year they contributed a new original song to Rockin' Bethlehem in support of Camperdown Children's Hospital. Brad Shepherd (as "Rock Hard") replaced Eaton and the band covered Kiss for Hard to Believe: A Kiss Covers Compilation. Dave Steel replaced Shepard as a live guitarist and in 1990 they covered Russell Morris's "Sweet, Sweet Love" for Used and Recovered By... RRR. In 1991 the lineup changed to be Crowe, Steve Waters, Christian Powers, Lara Goodridge and Tim Seckold. The band released EPs in 1992 and 1993. Andrew Masterton in the Age's EG writes of their first EP "The core of the is the combined sweet vocals of Joy Howard and Annette Crowe".

== Band members ==
- Annette Crowe (bass, vocals)
- Joy Howard (rhythm guitar, vocals)
- Tim Eaton (lead guitar)
- Frank Zaknich (drums)
- Brad Shepherd (guitar)
- Dave Steel (guitar)
- Steve Waters (guitar)
- Christian Powers (guitar)
- Lara Goodridge (backing vocals, violin)
- Tim Seckold (drums)

== Discography ==
=== Extended plays ===
Title	Details
See My Finger See My Thumb	Released: 1992; Label: Temptation Records (TEMPT 2); Format: CD
Dragster	Released: 1993; Label: Cleopatra Records (Dragster); Format: CD
