= Pasta (song) =

Single by Angie McMahon

from the album Salt
- Released: 7 March 2019
- Length: 4:38
- Label: Angie McMahon
- Songwriter(s): Angie McMahon

Angie McMahon singles chronology
"Helpless" (2018)	"Pasta" (2019)	"And I am a Woman" (2019)

"Pasta" is a song written and performed by Australian singer Angie McMahon. The song was released in March 2019 as the fourth single from McMahon's debut studio album Salt (2019). The song was certified gold in Australia in 2023.

The song premiered on triple j and is an ode to feeling lethargic and worn out.

The Ben McNamara directed music video captures feelings of procrastination and release. It was released in March 2019.

The song polled at number 72 on the Triple J Hottest 100, 2019.

At the APRA Music Awards of 2020, "Pasta" was shortlisted for Song of the Year.

== Reception ==
Triple J said "the song is actually another honest, insightful rock number."

== Certifications ==
Region	Certification	Certified units/sales
Australia (ARIA)	Gold	35,000^{‡}
^{‡} Sales+streaming figures based on certification alone.
