= Underground Lovers (album) =

Studio album by Underground Lovers
- Released: March 1991
- Genre: Indie rock
- Length: 38:24
- Label: Shock
- Producer: Simon Grounds

Underground Lovers chronology
Underground Lovers (1991)	Leaves Me Blind (1992)

Underground Lovers is the debut album by Australian indie rock/electronic band Underground Lovers, released in March 1991. The album was released in the UK under the title "Get To Notice".

"Looking for Rain" (April 1991) and "Lick the Boot" (August 1991) were lifted from the album as singles; "Lick the Boot" was also the band's first release in the UK. The band won the 1992 ARIA Award for Best New Artist.

== Track listing ==
(All music by Underground Lovers, all lyrics by Vincent Giarrusso)

1. "Get to Notice" – 4:45
2. "Yes I Do" – 1:44
3. "She Draws Circles" – 4:37
4. "Girl Afraid" – 3:43
5. "Persistence" – 4:12
6. "Wasted" – 4:06
7. "Looking For Rain" – 4:37
8. "Sleep" – 2:57
9. "Lick the Boot" – 4:00
10. "My American Accent" – 3:42

== Personnel ==
- Glenn Bennie – guitars, drums
- Vincent Giarrusso – vocals
- Maurice Argiro — bass
- Philippa Nihill — vocals
- Richard Andrew — drums
