= Konradsen =

Norwegian musical duo

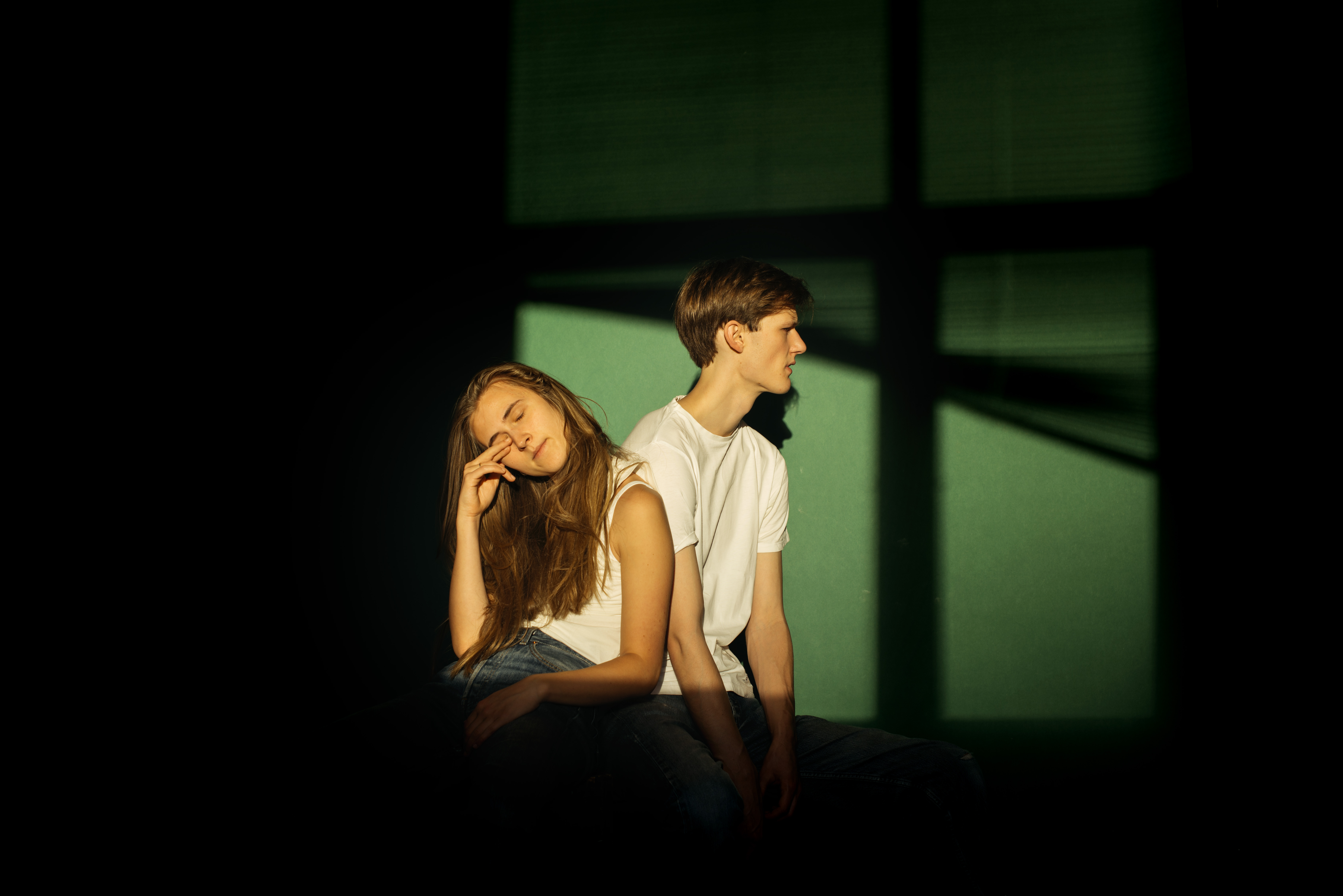
- Press photo

Background information
- Origin: Norway
- Genres: Indie
- Years active: 2017-present
- Labels: Cascine, Su Tissue
- Members: Jenny Marie Sabel, Eirik Vildgren

Konradsen is a Norwegian musical duo founded by musicians Jenny Marie Sabel and Eirik Vildgren. They are both originally from northern Norway, but by the release of their debut album had relocated to Oslo.

The group released its debut album, Saints & Sebastian Stories, on October 25, 2019, which was awarded the Norwegian Grammy Awards in the category indie/alternative. A follow-up EP was released on May 1, 2020, also on the label Cascine. Their album Hunt, Gather is scheduled to release on March 27, 2026.

== Discography ==
- Saints & Sebastian Stories (Cascine, 2019)
- Rodeo No. 5 EP (Cascine, 2020)
- You Can Be Loved EP (Ulyssa, 2021)
- Hunt, Gather (777 Music, 2026)
