= Rushall Station =

Studio album by Underground Lovers
- Released: April 1996
- Recorded: Hothouse, Melbourne, January 1996
- Genre: Indie rock
- Length: 45:12
- Label: Mainstream/Rubber
- Producers: Glenn Bennie, Vincent Giarrusso

Underground Lovers chronology
Dream It Down (1994)	Rushall Station (1996)	Ways T'Burn (1997)

Professional ratings
Review scores
Source	Rating
Herald Sun	3.5/5 stars

Rushall Station is the fourth album by Australian indie rock/electronic band Underground Lovers, released in 1996. It was named after Rushall railway station, located near the home of band member Vincent Giarrusso in Clifton Hill in Melbourne.

== Background ==
The album was the first to be released on the band's own label, Mainstream Recordings, following their departure from Polydor. It was recorded and mixed in 10 days for less than $5000 and the band did their own promotion and marketing.

Singer Vincent Giarrusso said: "We found on Polydor that we had to fit in with marketing plans and a lot of other bands. It's kind of good if you can stand it, but there were two years between Leaves Me Blind and Dream it Down, so it was a bit too frustrating. We want to put out one a year, at least." He said the band had also been unsettled by Polydor's plans for the follow-up to Dream It Down, their second album for the label, which had suffered from poor sales despite critical acclaim. Giarrusso told the Herald Sun that after giving Polydor a demo tape of its new songs, the band learned the label planned to hire a big-name producer and turn the album into an epic. "We wrote a letter to the lawyer," he said, "and told him we weren't happy with the way it was going, and could we be released from our contract?"

Giarrusso said the album could have been recorded in even less time than its 10 days. "We were in a studio that broke down half way through. We knew what we wanted to achieve, there was room to improvise within the songs, but we kept the song arrangements simple. It's quite different. The last two albums we did had a lot more layering of guitars, synthesisers and acoustic instruments to get a thicker, more lush sound. This time we went for a minimalist approach."

After performing on two tracks, singer Philippa Nihill left the band during recording to pursue a solo career; her debut solo EP, Dead Sad, was released on Mainstream in November 1996. Giarrusso said one of Nihill's songs for Rushall Station, "Song of Another Love", had traces of Englilsh trip hop band Portishead. "We tried to treat that track like a traditional ballad, but it's got an eerie feel about it. Philippa's delivery was something we had never heard before from her. She's been listening to a lot of Celtic music lately—I don't know why—but I think there's that sort of inflection in her voice."

"In My Head" and "Takes You Back"/"Undone" were released as singles. The album was nominated for best Australian independent release at the ARIA Music Awards of 1996.

== Track listing ==
(All songs by Glenn Bennie and Vincent Giarrusso)

1. "All Brand New" – 2:56
2. "Takes You Back" – 4:05
3. "In My Head" – 3:22
4. "On and On and On and On" – 4:55
5. "Rushall Station" – 5:14
6. "Some Stupid Adage" – 3:58
7. "Some Sweet Mourning" – 3:06
8. "Song of Another Love" – 3:20
9. "Descending for Now" – 4:04
10. "Undone" – 4:08
11. "Tabloid or Bust" – 6:04

== Personnel ==
- Glenn Bennie – guitars
- Vincent Giarrusso – vocals
- Maurice Argiro — bass
- Derek John Yuen — drums

Additional musicians

- Philippa Nihill — vocals ("Rushall Station", "Song of Another Love")
- Robert Goodge — keyboards ("Takes You Back", "In My Head", "On and On and On and On")
- Mal Pinkerton — cello
- Peter Knight (musician) — trumpet

Technical personnel

- Wayne Connolly — mixing
- Robert Goodge — additional production, engineering
- Justin Press — assistant engineer

== Charts ==
Chart performance for Dream It Down
Chart (1994)	Peak position
Australian Albums (ARIA)	107
