= The Waifs discography =

- Studio albums: 8
- Live albums: 2
- Singles: 9

The discography of The Waifs, an Australian folk rock band, consists of eight studio albums, nine singles and two live albums.

== Albums ==
=== Studio albums ===
Title	Album details	Chart peak positions	Certifications (sales thresholds)
Title	Album details	AUS	Certifications (sales thresholds)
The Waifs	Released: May 1996; Label: Outside Music (WAIFSCD001); Formats: CD	—	
Shelter Me	Released: 1 March 1998; Label: Outside Music (WAIFSCD002); Formats: CD	—	
Sink or Swim	Released: June 2000; Label: Outside Music (WAIFSCD003); Formats: CD	—	
Up All Night	Released: 13 January 2003; Label: Jarrah (WAIFSCD005); Formats: CD	3	ARIA: 2× Platinum
Sun Dirt Water	Released: 1 September 2007; Label: Jarrah (WAIFSCD010); Formats: CD	2	ARIA: Platinum
Temptation	Released: 4 March 2011; Label: Jarrah Jarrah (WAIFSCD013); Formats: CD, digital download	3	
Beautiful You	Released: 14 August 2015; Label: Jarrah (WAIFSCD013); Formats: CD, LP, digital download	5	
Ironbark	Released: 24 February 2017; Label: Jarrah (WAIFSCD014); Formats: 2×CD, digital download	1	
"—" denotes releases that did not chart or were not released in that territory.

=== Live albums ===
Title	Album details	Chart peak positions	Certifications
Title	Album details	AUS	Certifications
A Brief History...	Released: 8 November 2004; Label: Jarrah (WAIFSCD008); Formats: CD	23	ARIA: Platinum
Live from the Union of the Soul	Released: 1 January 2009; Label: Jarrah (WAIFSCD011); Formats: CD	48	—
"—" denotes releases that did not chart or were not released in that territory.

=== Singles ===
Year	Title	Peak chart positions			Album
Year	Title	AUS	AUS AIR	Hottest 100	Album
2002	"London Still"	49	—	3	Up All Night
2003	"Lighthouse"	62	1	12	Up All Night
2004	"Bridal Train"	50	1	54	A Brief History...
2007	"Sun Dirt Water"	32	1	92	Sun, Dirt, Water
2007	"Stay"	—	—	—	Sun, Dirt, Water
2015	"6000 Miles"	—	—	—	Beautiful You
2015	"Black Dirt Track"	—	—	—	Beautiful You
2017	"Ironbark"	—	—	—	Ironbark
2023	"I Was Only 19 (with John Schumann)"	—	—	—	non album single
"—" denotes a recording that did not chart or was not released in that territory.
