= A Brief History... =

A Brief History

Live album by The Waifs
- Released: 1 November 2004 (Australia); 11 January 2005 (U.S.)
- Recorded: 2002–2004
- Genre: Folk
- Length: 2:19:59
- Label: Jarrah
- Producer: The Waifs, Chris Wilson

The Waifs chronology
Up All Night (2003)	A Brief History (2004)	Sun Dirt Water (2007)

Professional ratings
Review scores
Source	Rating
Allmusic	3.5/5 stars

A Brief History... is the fifth album and first live album by Australian folk band The Waifs, first released by Jarrah in 2004.

== Track listing ==
=== Disk one ===
1. "Lighthouse" – 4:17
2. "London Still" – 4:29
3. "Take It In" – 3:40
4. "Love Serenade" – 3:11
5. "The Waitress" – 4:00
6. "Fisherman's Daughter" – 6:35
7. "Papa" – 2:58
8. "Crazy Train" – 8:02
9. "Brain Damage" – 4:59
10. "Don't Think Twice, It's Alright" – 3:18
11. "Lies" – 4:43
12. "Haircut" – 4:23
13. "The River" – 4:02
14. "Gillian" – 4:41
15. "A Brief History..." – 5:03
16. "Bridal Train (studio version)" – 4:21

=== Disk two ===
1. "Willow Tree" – 4:06
2. "When I Die (introduction)" – 0:40
3. "When I Die" – 4:28
4. "Sunflower Man" – 4:11
5. "Flesh And Blood" – 5:16
6. "Highway One" – 5:17
7. "Bridal Train (introduction)" – 0:35
8. "Bridal Train" – 4:20
9. "Since I've Been Around" – 4:44
10. "Here If You Want" – 3:53
11. "Billy Jones" – 4:15
12. "Company" – 4:16
13. "Spotlight" – 5:46
14. "Shelter Me" – 3:12
15. "Shiny Apple" – 3:16
16. "Crazy/Circles" – 9:51

All songs by the members of the Waifs, with the exception of "Crazy/Circles", which was written by Willie Nelson and The Waifs and "Don't Think Twice, It's Alright", which was written by Bob Dylan.

== Personnel ==
=== Musical ===
- Josh Cunningham – Guitar, Vocals
- Donna Simpson – Guitar, Vocals, Photography
- Vikki Simpson – Guitar, Harmonica, Vocals
- Jen Anderson – Violin
- Ben Franz – Guitar (Bass), Photography

=== Technical ===
- Philip Barlow – Photography
- James Cadsky – Engineer
- Joseph Carra – Mastering
- Simon Cowling – Photography, Cover Photo
- Jill Furmanovsky – Photography
- James Hewgill – Engineer
- Sam Hickey – Design
- Anton Koch – Engineer, Live Sound, Live Sound Engineer
- Kit Luce – Photography
- Steven Schram – Engineer, Assistant
- Ellen Smith – Photography
- Phil Stevens – Photography, Management
- Chris Thompson – Engineer, Mixing
- Kathy Wade – Photography
- The Waifs – Producer, Photography

== Charts ==
Chart (2004-07)	Peak position
Australian Albums (ARIA)	23

== Certifications ==
Region	Certification	Certified units/sales
Australia (ARIA)	Platinum	70,000^{^}
^{^} Shipments figures based on certification alone.
