= Triple J's Hottest 100 of 2007 =

Australian song chart in 2007

2007 Triple J Hottest 100

Countdown details
- Date of countdown: 26 January 2008

Countdown highlights
- Winning song: Muse "Knights of Cydonia"
- Most entries: Silverchair; Kings of Leon; John Butler Trio; Bloc Party; Josh Pyke; Harry Angus (3 tracks)

Chronology
← Previous; 2006	Next → 2008

The 2007 Triple J Hottest 100 was announced on January 26, 2008. It was the fifteenth countdown of the most popular songs of the year, as chosen by the listeners of Australian radio station Triple J.

Voting began on 1 January 2008, and closed on 20 January 2008. More than 700,000 votes were counted in the poll. The broadcast began at 10 a.m. AEST, and for the first time was broadcast live to all time zones (as opposed to being on a delayed broadcast). Triple J hosted two live sites, one at The Domain, Sydney and one at Melbourne Docklands.

The 2007 poll was the closest in Hottest 100 history with only 13 votes separating the number 1 and 2 songs. The 2007 Hottest 100 contained 52 works by Australian artists, equaling the record set in 1999.

== Full list ==
Note: Australian artists

#	Song	Artist	Country of origin
1	Knights of Cydonia	Muse	United Kingdom
2	Straight Lines	Silverchair	Australia
3	On Call	Kings of Leon	United States
4	Better Than	John Butler Trio	Australia
5	This Heart Attack	Faker	Australia
6	The Pretender	Foo Fighters	United States
7	Harder, Better, Faster, Stronger (Alive 2007)	Daft Punk	France
8	Hang Me Up to Dry	Cold War Kids	United States
9	I'll Kill Her	Soko	France
10	Don't Fight It	The Panics	Australia
11	Vitriol	Bluejuice	Australia
12	Let's Dance to Joy Division	The Wombats	United Kingdom
13	Ruby	Kaiser Chiefs	United Kingdom
14	Ice Cream	Muscles	Australia
15	Lost and Running	Powderfinger	Australia
16	Snakeskin	Gyroscope	Australia
17	Paper Planes	M.I.A.	United Kingdom
18	My People	The Presets	Australia
19	Heart It Races	Architecture in Helsinki	Australia
20	Stronger	Kanye West	United States
21	The Salmon Dance	The Chemical Brothers	United Kingdom
22	Used to Get High	John Butler Trio	Australia
23	Icky Thump	The White Stripes	United States
24	Hunting for Witches	Bloc Party	United Kingdom
25	We Get Around	Urthboy	Australia
26	Recapturing the Vibe (Restrung)	Hilltop Hoods	Australia
27	Just a Song About Ping Pong	Operator Please	Australia
28	Lazy Eye	Silversun Pickups	United States
29	Real Love (Like a Version)	Regina Spektor	United States
30	If You Keep Losing Sleep	Silverchair	Australia
31	Wasted	Angus & Julia Stone	Australia
32	Opinions Won't Keep You Warm at Night	Kisschasy	Australia
33	Fans	Kings of Leon	United States
34	1234	Feist	Canada
35	D.A.N.C.E.	Justice	France
36	Hold Music	Architecture in Helsinki	Australia
37	Hospital Beds	Cold War Kids	United States
38	I Thought About You	The Beautiful Girls	Australia
39	Hearts on Fire	Cut Copy	Australia
40	I Still Remember	Bloc Party	United Kingdom
41	Dashboard	Modest Mouse	United States
42	Back in Your Head	Tegan & Sara	Canada
43	Superstar	Lupe Fiasco featuring Matthew Santos	United States
44	Teenagers	My Chemical Romance	United States
45	The Beast	Angus & Julia Stone	Australia
46	Tie Up My Hands	British India	Australia
47	What If	Cog	Australia
48	Flux	Bloc Party	United Kingdom
49	Fluorescent Adolescent	Arctic Monkeys	United Kingdom
50	So Many Nights	The Cat Empire	Australia
51	Peachy	Missy Higgins	Australia
52	Spray on Pants	Kisschasy	Australia
53	Steer	Missy Higgins	Australia
54	Golden Skans	Klaxons	United Kingdom
55	Good Excuse	John Butler Trio	Australia
56	Better People	Xavier Rudd	Australia
57	Into the Galaxy	Midnight Juggernauts	Australia
58	Invincible	Muse	United Kingdom
59	Chelsea Dagger	The Fratellis	United Kingdom
60	Charmer	Kings of Leon	United States
61	Wayside	Birds of Tokyo	Australia
62	No Longer There	The Cat Empire	Australia
63	The Only Way	Karnivool	Australia
64	Australia	The Shins	United States
65	Smokers Outside the Hospital Doors	Editors	United Kingdom
66	I Don't Remember	Powderfinger	Australia
67	Rehab (Remix)	Amy Winehouse featuring Jay-Z	United Kingdom/United States
68	Penny on the Train Track	Ben Kweller	United States
69	Pogo	Digitalism	Germany
70	The Con	Tegan & Sara	Canada
71	Reach	The Butterfly Effect	Australia
72	Down the Line	José González	Sweden
73	Black Tattoo	Grinspoon	Australia
74	Run the Red Light	British India	Australia
75	Shoot the Runner	Kasabian	United Kingdom
76	Sweaty	Muscles	Australia
77	Get What You Want	Operator Please	Australia
78	Brianstorm	Arctic Monkeys	United Kingdom
79	Lines on Palms	Josh Pyke	Australia
80	Reflections of a Sound	Silverchair	Australia
81	No Cars Go	Arcade Fire	Canada
82	Long Road to Ruin	Foo Fighters	United States
83	Pleased to Meet You	Wolfmother	Australia
84	Do It Again	The Chemical Brothers	United Kingdom
85	Down Boy	Yeah Yeah Yeahs	United States
86	Tombstone	Midnight Juggernauts	Australia
87	Eliza	Jackson Jackson	Australia
88	The Message	The Cops	Australia
89	Sick, Sick, Sick	Queens of the Stone Age	United States
90	When the Lights Went Down	Clare Bowditch and the Feeding Set	Australia
91	Sew My Name	Josh Pyke	Australia
92	Sun Dirt Water	The Waifs	Australia
93	Dr. Love	The Bumblebeez	Australia
94	Jigsaw Falling into Place	Radiohead	United Kingdom
95	Samson	Regina Spektor	United States
96	Love Me Like the World Is Ending	Ben Lee	Australia
97	Forever Song	Josh Pyke	Australia
98	The Heinrich Maneuver	Interpol	United States
99	Tick Tick Boom	The Hives	Sweden
100	Wild Strawberries	Pnau	Australia

== Statistics ==
=== Artists with multiple entries ===
#	Artist	Entries
3	Silverchair	2, 30, 80
3	Kings of Leon	3, 33, 60
3	John Butler Trio	4, 22, 55
3	Bloc Party	24, 40, 48
3	Harry Angus (Note: Twice with The Cat Empire (50, 62), once with Jackson Jackson (87))	50, 62, 87
3	Josh Pyke	79, 91, 97
2	Muse	1, 58
2	Foo Fighters	6, 82
2	Cold War Kids	8, 37
2	Muscles	14, 76
2	Powderfinger	15, 66
2	Architecture in Helsinki	19, 36
2	The Chemical Brothers	21, 84
2	Operator Please	27, 77
2	Regina Spektor	29, 95
2	Angus & Julia Stone	31, 45
2	Kisschasy	32, 52
2	Tegan and Sara	42, 70
2	British India	46, 74
2	Arctic Monkeys	49, 78
2	The Cat Empire	50, 62
2	Missy Higgins	51, 53
2	Midnight Juggernauts	57, 86
2	Ian Kenny (Note: Once with Birds of Tokyo (61), once with Karnivool (63))	61, 63

=== Countries represented ===
Country	Entries
Australia	52
United States	22
United Kingdom	18
Canada	4
France	3
Sweden	2
Germany	1

=== Records ===
- This is the first Hottest 100 not to feature The Living End since 1996. Ending their streak of ten consecutive appearances.
- Muse's "Knights of Cydonia" was first released July 2006, making the song over 18 months old when it was awarded the No. 1 spot.
- Daft Punk's "Harder, Better, Faster, Stronger" made an appearance twice in the countdown, in a live version at No. 7, and sampled in Kanye West's "Stronger", at No. 20.
- For the first time since the 2002 countdown, Triple J revealed what song came in at No. 101 spot. No. 101 belonged to "Foundations" by Kate Nash.
- The song "Recapturing the Vibe" by Hilltop Hoods charted in the countdown for the second year in a row, with a 'restrung' version featuring at No. 26.
- The Butterfly Effect and Jack White, made their fifth consecutive appearance in the Hottest 100, with both artists having featured in every annual countdown since 2003.

== Top 10 Albums of 2007 ==
#	Artist	Album	Country of origin	Tracks in the Hottest 100
1	John Butler Trio	Grand National	Australia	4, 22, 55 (12 in 2006)
2	Radiohead	In Rainbows	United Kingdom	94
3	Kings of Leon	Because of the Times	United States	3, 33, 60
4	Arcade Fire	Neon Bible	Canada	81
5	Silverchair	Young Modern	Australia	2, 30, 80
6	Josh Pyke	Memories & Dust	Australia	79, 91, 97 (38 in 2006)
7	The White Stripes	Icky Thump	United States	23
8	Bloc Party	A Weekend in the City	United Kingdom	24, 40, 48 (65 in 2006)
9	Midnight Juggernauts	Dystopia	Australia	57, 86
10	Arctic Monkeys	Favourite Worst Nightmare	United Kingdom	49, 78

== CD release ==
Triple J's Hottest 100 Volume 15 is the compilation featuring the best of the Top 100 voted tracks on two CDs. It went on sale 8 March 2008.

Disc 1
No.	Title	Artist(s)	Length
1.	"Knights of Cydonia" (#1)	Muse	4:49
2.	"Harder, Better, Faster, Stronger (Alive 2007 Radio Version)" (#7)	Daft Punk	3:27
3.	"Better Than" (#4)	John Butler Trio	3:27
4.	"On Call" (#3)	Kings of Leon	3:23
5.	"I'll Kill Her" (#9)	Soko	3:51
6.	"This Heart Attack" (#5)	Faker	3:47
7.	"Vitriol" (#11)	Bluejuice	2:29
8.	"Hunting for Witches" (#24)	Bloc Party	3:31
9.	"Snakeskin" (#16)	Gyroscope	4:11
10.	"Ruby" (#13)	Kaiser Chiefs	3:23
11.	"Heart It Races" (#19)	Architecture in Helsinki	2:57
12.	"The Salmon Dance" (#21)	The Chemical Brothers featuring Fatlip	3:40
13.	"Dashboard" (#41)	Modest Mouse	4:06
14.	"I Thought About You" (#38)	The Beautiful Girls	3:12
15.	"Into the Galaxy" (#57)	Midnight Juggernauts	4:08
16.	"Paper Planes" (#17)	M.I.A.	3:24
17.	"Wasted" (#31)	Angus & Julia Stone	3:44
18.	"Hang Me Up to Dry" (#8)	Cold War Kids	3:38
19.	"Chelsea Dagger" (#59)	The Fratellis	3:35
20.	"Pogo" (#69)	Digitalism	3:05
21.	"The Pretender" (#6)	Foo Fighters	4:31

Disc 2
No.	Title	Artist(s)	Length
1.	"Straight Lines" (#2)	Silverchair	4:17
2.	"My People" (#18)	The Presets	3:49
3.	"We Get Around" (#25)	Urthboy	3:37
4.	"Let's Dance to Joy Division" (#12)	The Wombats	2:54
5.	"Just a Song About Ping Pong" (#27)	Operator Please	2:17
6.	"Don't Fight It" (#10)	The Panics	3:56
7.	"Cars Go" (#81)	Arcade Fire	5:40
8.	"Golden Skans" (#54)	Klaxons	2:45
9.	"Tie Up My Hands" (#46)	British India	3:33
10.	"Back in Your Head" (#42)	Tegan And Sara	3:00
11.	"Ice Cream" (#14)	Muscles	3:28
12.	"So Many Nights" (#50)	The Cat Empire	3:31
13.	"Opinions Won't Keep You Warm at Night" (#32)	Kisschasy	3:05
14.	"D.A.N.C.E." (#35)	Justice	3:28
15.	"Superstar" (#43)	Lupe Fiasco featuring Matthew Santos	3:59
16.	"Jigsaw Falling into Place" (#94)	Radiohead	4:05
17.	"Peachy" (#51)	Missy Higgins	2:36
18.	"Lines on Palms" (#79)	Josh Pyke	3:01
19.	"Hearts on Fire" (#39)	Cut Copy	3:51
20.	"Recapturing the Vibe (Restrung)" (#26)	Hilltop Hoods	3:16
21.	"What If" (#47)	Cog	4:19
22.	"Wild Strawberries" (#100)	Pnau	3:54

=== DVD Release ===
1. Muse – "Knights of Cydonia" (#1)
2. Silverchair – "Straight Lines" (#2)
3. Daft Punk – "Harder, Better, Faster, Stronger (Live)" (#7)
4. The Chemical Brothers feat. Fatlip- "The Salmon Dance" (#21)
5. Architecture in Helsinki – "Heart It Races" (#19)
6. The Bumblebeez – "Dr Love" (#93)
7. The John Butler Trio – "Better Than" (#4)
8. Foo Fighters – "The Pretender" (#6)
9. The Panics – "Don't Fight It" (#10)
10. M.I.A. – "Paper Planes" (#17)
11. Justice – "D.A.N.C.E." (#35)
12. Urthboy – "We Get Around" (#25)
13. The Wombats – "Let's Dance to Joy Division" (#12)
14. Operator Please – "Just a Song About Ping Pong" (#27)
15. Modest Mouse – "Dashboard" (#41)
16. Klaxons – "Golden Skans" (#54)
17. The Presets – "My People" (#18)
18. Bloc Party – "Flux" (#48)
19. Faker – "This Heart Attack" (#5)
20. Tegan and Sara – "Back in Your Head" (#42)
21. Gyroscope – "Snakeskin" (#16)
22. Kisschasy – "Opinions Won’t Keep You Warm at Night" (#32)
23. José González – "Down the Line" (#72)
24. My Chemical Romance – "Teenagers" (#44)
25. Midnight Juggernauts – "Into the Galaxy" (#57)
26. Digitalism – "Pogo" (#69)
27. Bluejuice – "Vitriol" (#11)
28. Missy Higgins – "Steer" (#53)
29. Amy Winehouse – "Rehab" (#67)
30. Kings of Leon – "On Call" (#3)
31. Kasabian – "Shoot the Runner" (#75)
32. Hilltop Hoods – "Recapturing the Vibe Restrung" (#26)
33. Jackson Jackson – "Eliza" (#87)
34. Regina Spektor – "Samson" (#95)
35. Angus & Julia Stone – "Wasted" (#31)
36. Cold War Kids – "Hang Me Up to Dry" (#8)
37. The Beautiful Girls – "I Thought About You" (#38)
38. Cog – "What If" (#47)
39. Lupe Fiasco feat. Matthew Santos – "Superstar" (#43)
40. Muscles – "Sweaty" (#76)
41. Josh Pyke – "Lines on Palms" (#79)
42. Editors – "Smokers Outside the Hospital Doors" (#65)
