= Up All Night (The Waifs album) =

Studio album by The Waifs
- Released: 13 January 2003
- Recorded: 2002
- Genre: Folk
- Length: 47:44
- Label: Jarrah
- Producer: The Waifs, Chris Thompson, Steven Schram

The Waifs chronology
Sink or Swim (2000)	Up All Night (2003)	A Brief History... (2004)

Singles from Up All Night
- 1. "London Still" Released: 2002; 2. "Lighthouse" Released: 2003

Professional ratings
Review scores
Source	Rating
Allmusic	2.5/5 stars

Up All Night is the fourth studio album by Australian folk band The Waifs, first released by Jarrah in January 2003. Critics reacted more favourably to this release and it has been the band's biggest album to date.

Up All Night debuted on the Australian ARIA album chart at No. 3 and 12 months later had shipped over 140,000 copies, garnering a double platinum accreditation.

Their hard work was rewarded at the ARIA Music Awards of 2003 where they won Best Independent Release, Best Blues and Roots Album for Up All Night, as well as Engineer of the Year and Producer of the Year for Chris Thompson's work on the album. The media celebrated with them, calling them an "overnight success 11 years in the making!".

In some parts of North America, the album was packaged with a bonus sampler of Waifs songs.

== Track listing ==
1. "Fisherman's Daughter" (D. Simpson) – 4:43
2. "Nothing New" (V. Simpson) – 3:32
3. "London Still" (D. Simpson) – 3:46
4. "Lighthouse" (Cunningham) – 3:21
5. "Flesh And Blood" (Cunningham) – 4:00
6. "Highway One" (D. Simpson) – 5:07
7. "Since I've Been Around" (Cunningham) – 4:40
8. "Fourth Floor" (Cunningham) – 3:25
9. "Rescue" (D. Simpson) – 2:32
10. "Three Down" (V. Simpson) – 3:18
11. "Sweetness" (D. Simpson) – 3:24
12. "Up All Night" (Cunningham) – 5:51

== Personnel ==
=== Musical ===
- Josh Cunningham - Dobro, Guitar, Mandolin, Songwriter, Ukulele, Vocals, Group Member
- Donna Simpson - Guitar (Acoustic), Songwriter, Vocals, Group Member
- Vikki Simpson - Guitar (Acoustic), Harmonica, Songwriter, Vocals, Group Member
- Ben Franz - Bass, Dobro, Bass (Electric), Double Bass
- David MacDonald - Percussion, Drums
- Bruce Haymes - Keyboards, Wurlitzer

=== Technical ===
- Sam Hickey - Design, Photography, Typography
- Mark Howard - Engineer
- Tony "Jack The Bear" Mantz - Mastering
- Victor Rijken - Photography Official Site
- Steven Schram - Producer, Assistant Engineer, Mixing, Mixing Assistant
- Chris Thompson - Producer, Engineer, Mixing
- The Waifs - Photography

== Charts ==
=== Weekly charts ===
Chart (2003–04)	Peak position
Australian Albums (ARIA)	3
UK Country Albums (OCC)	3

=== Year-end charts ===
Chart (2003)	Position
Australian Albums (ARIA)	40

== Certifications ==
Region	Certification	Certified units/sales
Australia (ARIA)	2× Platinum	140,000^{^}
^{^} Shipments figures based on certification alone.
