= The Waifs (album) =

Studio album by The Waifs
- Released: May 1996
- Recorded: February 1996, Western Australia
- Genre: Folk
- Length: 44:29
- Label: Outside Music (later re-released on Jarrah Records, Compass Records)
- Producer: The Waifs; Jen Anderson; Michael Thomas

The Waifs chronology
The Waifs (1996)	Shelter Me (1998)

Professional ratings
Review scores
Source	Rating
Allmusic	3/5 stars

The Waifs is the self-titled debut album by Australian folk band The Waifs, first released in May 1996.

== Release and re-release ==
The Waifs was originally released on Outside Music in 1996. Based on the mainstream success of the Waifs in the early 2000s, the album was later re-released on Jarrah Records of Australia in 2003, and Compass Records in America in 2004.

== Track listing ==
1. Take It In (Cunningham) - 3:42
2. Gillian (Cunningham) - 3:21
3. Circles (Simpson) - 2:58
4. Sunflower Man (Simpson) - 3:13
5. Intimate (Cunningham) - 3:25
6. Jealousy (Cunningham) - 4:16
7. Crazy Train (Simpson) - 4:19
8. Billy Jones (Simpson) - 3:55
9. Brain Damage (Cunningham) - 2:45
10. I Believe (Cunningham) - 3:45
11. Company (Simpson) - 3:25
12. Waif Song (Waifs) - 3:10
13. Shiny Apple (Cunningham) - 2:11

== Personnel ==
=== Musical ===
- Josh Cunningham - Guitar, Mandola
- Donna Simpson - Guitar, Percussion, Vocals, Group Member
- Vikki Simpson - Guitar, Harmonica, Vocals, Tin Whistle
- Jen Anderson - Mandolin, Violin, Producer, Engineer
- Mark Aspland - Percussion
- Archie Cuthbertson - Percussion

=== Technical ===
- Simon Cowling - Photography
- Dylan Hughes - Engineer
- Tim Johnson - Mixing
- Tim Johnston - Mastering
- Michael Thomas - Producer, Engineer
- The Waifs - Producer
