= Sun Dirt Water =

Studio album by The Waifs
- Released: 1 September 2007
- Recorded: February 2007
- Genre: Folk rock
- Length: 46:35
- Label: Jarrah

The Waifs chronology
A Brief History... (2004)	Sun Dirt Water (2007)	Live from the Union of the Soul (2009)

Professional ratings
Review scores
Source	Rating
AllMusic	4/5 stars

Sun Dirt Water is the fifth studio album by Australian folk rock band The Waifs. It was released by Jarrah Records on 1 September 2007. It debuted at number two in the ARIA Albums Chart on 10 September. It was certified platinum, for shipment of 70000 units, in 2010.

== Track listing ==
1. "Pony" (Cunningham)
2. "Sun Dirt Water" (Thorn)
3. "Vermillion" (Simpson)
4. "How Many Miles" (Cunningham)
5. "Without You" (Cunningham)
6. "Sad Sailor Song" (Simpson)
7. "Get Me Some" (Cunningham)
8. "Eternity" (Cunningham)
9. "Sweetest Dream" (Cunningham)
10. "Goodbye" (Cunningham)
11. "Stay" (Cunningham)
12. "Love Let Me Down" (Simpson)
13. "Feeling Sentimental" (Cunningham)

== Personnel ==
=== The Waifs ===
- Josh Cunningham - vocals, acoustic & electric guitars, ukulele
- Donna Simpson - vocals, acoustic guitar, percussion
- Vikki Thorn - vocals, harmonica, acoustic guitar
- Ben Franz - electric & double bass
- David Ross Macdonald - drums & percussion

=== Additional Musicians ===
- Reese Wynans - hammond b3, piano, wurlitzer
- Dan Dugmore - pedal steel, lap steel
- Jeff Coffin - clarinet
- Scat Springs - background vocals
- Erick Jaskowiak - background vocals
- Garry West - hand claps

== Credits ==
- Produced by The Waifs and Garry West
- Recorded at Compass Sound Studio, Nashville, TN
- Engineered by Erick Jaskowiak

== Charts ==
=== Weekly charts ===
Chart (2007)	Peak position
Australian Albums (ARIA)	2

=== Year-end charts ===
Chart (2007)	Peak position
Australian (ARIA Charts)	57

== Certifications ==
Region	Certification	Certified units/sales
Australia (ARIA)	Platinum	70,000^{^}
^{^} Shipments figures based on certification alone.
