= Good Excuse =

Single by The John Butler Trio

from the album Grand National
- A-side: "Good Excuse"
- Released: March 2007
- Recorded: 2004; Sing Sing Studios; Melbourne, Australia
- Genre: Alternative rock, roots rock, funk
- Length: 3:26
- Label: Jarrah — AUS; Atlantic — US
- Songwriter(s): John Butler
- Producer(s): John Butler; Mario Caldato Jr.

The John Butler Trio singles chronology
| "Funky Tonight" (2006) | "Good Excuse" (2007) | "Better Than" (2007) |

"Good Excuse" is a promotional-only release by the Australian jam band, The John Butler Trio, from their fourth studio album Grand National.

"Good Excuse" was released in March 2007 in Australia by Jarrah Records and in the United States by Atlantic Records.

Butler describes the song as a "wake-up call to our self-obsessed consumerist society".

== Awards ==
"Good Excuse" won 'Blues & Roots Work of the Year' at the 2008 Australasian Performing Right Association Awards.

== Video ==
The video for the song was directed by James Hackett and Jean Camden (Hackett Films) and features a combination of 2D and 3D animation together with live action. The video was nominated 'Most Popular Music Video' at the 2008 West Australian Music Industry Awards.

== Track listing ==
Written by John Butler

| No. | Title | Length |
|---|---|---|
| 1. | "Good Excuse" | 3:26 |
| Total length: | | 3:26 |

== Personnel ==
=== John Butler Trio ===
- John Butler — vocals, acoustic/amplified 6 string guitar, harmonica
- Shannon Birchall — double bass, backing vocals
- Michael Barker — drums, congas, shaker, tambourine, cow bells, vibraslap, backing vocals

=== Additional musicians ===
- Michael Caruana — piano, B3 Hammond

=== Production credits ===
- John Butler — producer
- Mario Caldato Jr. — producer, engineer, mixing
- Shannon Birchall — co-producer
- Michael Barker — co-producer
- Jarrad Hearman — assistant engineer
- Bernie Grundman — mastering
- Tom Walker — artwork

== Certifications ==
Certifications for "Good Excuse"
| Region | Certification | Certified units/sales |
|---|---|---|
| Australia (ARIA) | Gold | 35,000^{‡} |
^{‡} Sales+streaming figures based on certification alone.
