= Funky Tonight =

2006 single by John Butler Trio

Single by John Butler Trio

from the album Grand National
- Released: 9 December 2006
- Length: 3:41
- Label: Jarrah
- Songwriter: John Butler
- Producers: Mario Caldato Jnr; John Butler

John Butler Trio singles chronology
"Somethings Gotta Give" (2004)	"Funky Tonight" (2006)	"Better Than" (2007)

"Funky Tonight" is a song by Australian roots rock band John Butler Trio from their fourth studio album, Grand National. It was released in December 2006 through Jarrah Records as the album's lead single. The cover art for the single was designed by Tom Walker. The song peaked at number 15 on the Australian ARIA Singles Chart. It performed at the ARIA Music Awards of 2007 with special guest Keith Urban, which was then released as a digital download; this version debuted and peaked at number 11 on the ARIA Singles Chart. The video for "Funky Tonight" was directed by Damon Escott and Stephen Lance.

== Track listing ==
All tracks are written by John Butler.

No.	Title	Length
1.	"Funky Tonight"	3:41
2.	"Good as Gone"	2:32
3.	"Nowhere Man" (demo)	3:26
4.	"Funky Tonight" (live)	6:00
Total length:		15:39

== Personnel ==
- John Butler – 12-string guitar, 6-string nylon guitar, banjo, harmonica, vocals
- Shannon Birchall – double bass, electric bass, vocals
- Michael Barker – drums, percussion, vocals
- Danielle Caruana – backing vocals on "Good As Gone"

== Charts ==
Chart (2006)	Peak position
Australia (ARIA)	15

Chart (2007)	Peak position
Australia (ARIA) live at the 2007 ARIA Awards with Keith Urban	11
