= Hearman =

Hearman is a surname. Notable people with the surname include:

- Jarrad Hearman (born 1980), British recording, mixing and mastering engineer
- John Hearman (1910–1994), Australian politician
- Louise Hearman (born 1963), Australian painter
