= Still (Katy B song) =

Single by Katy B

from the album Little Red
- Released: 2 May 2014
- Recorded: 2013
- Genre: Electronic
- Length: 3:29
- Label: Rinse; Ammunition; Sony
- Songwriters: Kathleen Anne Brien; Gordon Warren; Fraser T Smith
- Producers: Geeneus; Fraser T Smith

Katy B singles chronology
"Crying for No Reason" (2014)	"Still" (2014)	"Save Me" (2015)

"Still" is a song by English singer Katy B, produced by Geeneus and Fraser T Smith. It was released on 2 May 2014 as the official third and final single from her second studio album, Little Red. The song peaked at number 116 on the UK Singles Chart. The Richy Ahmed remix of the song appears on the soundtrack of the 2014 racing video game Forza Horizon 2.

== Music video ==
The music video for "Still" was released onto Katy B's YouTube channel on 31 March 2014. Produced by Sophie Muller, it features several scenes of Katy B in a white outfit, standing against winter landscapes and white backgrounds, surrounded by light, in order to highlight the color of her hair. In other scenes, Katy sits alone on a glowing table. The video has a total length of three minutes and twenty-nine seconds, the same length as the song itself.

== Track listing ==
Digital download - single
No.	Title	Length
1.	"Still"	3:29

Digital Download - Remix EP
No.	Title	Length
1.	"Still" (Billon Remix)	4:56
2.	"Still" (Richy Ahmed Remix)	5:25
Total length:		10:21

Promo CD
No.	Title	Length
1.	"Still"	3:29
2.	"Still" (Instrumental)	3:29
Total length:		06:58

== Personnel ==
- Kathleen "Katy B" Brien - vocals, writer
- Fraser T Smith - producer, writer
- Gordon "Geeneus" Warren - producer, writer
- Jarrad Hearman - mixing

== Chart performance ==
The song charted at number 84 in the HOT40UK, lasting two days in the same position. It was the first single from the album Little Red to chart this low. On the UK Singles Chart, the song peaked at number 116.
