= Better Than =

2007 single by John Butler Trio

Single by John Butler Trio

from the album Grand National
- Released: 27 August 2007
- Length: 3:31
- Label: Jarrah
- Songwriter: John Butler
- Producers: John Butler; Mario Caldato Jr.

John Butler Trio singles chronology
"Good Excuse" (2007)	"Better Than" (2007)	"Used to Get High" (2007)

"Better Than" is a song by Australian band John Butler Trio from their fourth studio album, Grand National (2007). Produced by John Butler and Mario Caldato Jr., it was released as the album's third single in Australia in August 2007. In the United States, it was released digitally as the album's lead single in early 2007. The single includes two previously unreleased tracks recorded in the Grand National sessions and a special radio mix version of "Better Than" from Chris Lord-Alge.

"Better Than" debuted and peaked at number 16 on the Australian ARIA Singles Chart on 3 September 2007. On the Triple J Hottest 100 of 2007, it ranked in at number four. The song also charted in the US, where it topped the Billboard Triple A chart for seven weeks in mid-2007.

== Music video ==
An accompanying music video for "Better Than", which utilizes the "Chris Lord-Alge radio mix" has been released on YouTube on 1 August 2007. In this video, members of the John Butler Trio band perform the song while on animated posters and performing on various spots of the streets with various pedestrians and skateboarders going by. Throughout, two messages (which reiterate the lyrical content in the song itself) are shown in a style of graffiti saying "The best things in life...aren't things!" and "Art changes people... people change the world."

== Track listing ==
All tracks are written by John Butler.

Australian CD single
No.	Title	Length
1.	"Better Than"	3:31
2.	"Recognise Me"	4:02
3.	"Ain't That Just the Way"	5:23
4.	"Better Than" (Chris Lord-Alge radio mix)	3:28

== Personnel ==
The John Butler Trio

- John Butler – vocals, acoustic/amplified 6 string guitar, banjo, harmonica
- Shannon Birchall – double bass, backing vocals
- Michael Barker – drums, congas, shaker, tambourine, cow bells, vibraslap, backing vocals

Production credits

- John Butler – producer
- Mario Caldato Jr. – production, engineering, mixing
- Shannon Birchall – co-production
- Michael Barker – co-production
- Jarrad Hearman – assistant engineering
- Bernie Grundman – mastering
- Tom Walker – artwork

== Charts ==
=== Weekly charts ===
Chart (2007)	Peak position
Australia (ARIA)	16
New Zealand (Recorded Music NZ)	32
US Triple A (Billboard)	1

=== Year-end charts ===
Chart (2007)	Position
Australia (ARIA)	100

== Certifications ==
Certifications for "Better Than"
Region	Certification	Certified units/sales
Australia (ARIA)	3× Platinum	210,000^{‡}
^{‡} Sales+streaming figures based on certification alone.
