= Used to Get High =

Single by The John Butler Trio

from the album Grand National
- A-side: "Used to Get High"
- Released: November 2007
- Recorded: 2005-2006
- Genre: Alternative rock, roots rock, funk
- Length: 3:45
- Label: Jarrah
- Songwriter: John Butler
- Producers: John Butler and Mario Caldato Jr.

The John Butler Trio singles chronology
"Better Than" (2007)	"Used to Get High" (2007)	"One Way Road" (2009)

Music video
- "Used to Get High" on YouTube

"Used to Get High" is a radio promotional single by Australian jam band, The John Butler Trio from their fourth studio album Grand National. It was released by Jarrah Records in November 2007. It deals with the issue of addiction, and the many forms it takes.

The song was voted in at #22 on Triple J's Hottest 100 for 2007.

"Used to Get High" featured on the 2009 Australian comedy film, Stone Bros., directed by Richard J. Frankland.

== Music video ==
The music video for the song was directed by Dori Oskowitz (Highway 144) and was released to MTV and YouTube on 28 February 2008. The video received little airplay, but has over 2,000,000 views on YouTube. The video opens with John Butler walking down a dark alleyway, he picks up his guitar and the band begins playing the song in the same alleyway. Despite several puddles, a dark look and a generally unpleasant looking location, the band plays, and is obviously enjoying themselves. During the second verse, a man can be seen taking pills. As the band performs, a crowd begins to formulate. But each of them is distracted by something. Some are distracted by mobile phones, some are eating, and some are using portable games consoles. In the final verse, leading the final chorus in the song, a young boy sees the band playing, and begins to move to the rhythm. The rest of the crowd notices the band, and does the same. When the song finishes, the crowd dissipates, and the video fades to black.

== Track listing ==
All tracks written by John Butler

No.	Title	Length
1.	"Used to Get High"	3:45
Total length:		3:45

== Certifications ==
Certifications for "Used to Get High"
Region	Certification	Certified units/sales
Australia (ARIA)	Gold	35,000^{‡}
^{‡} Sales+streaming figures based on certification alone.
