= Bride trains =

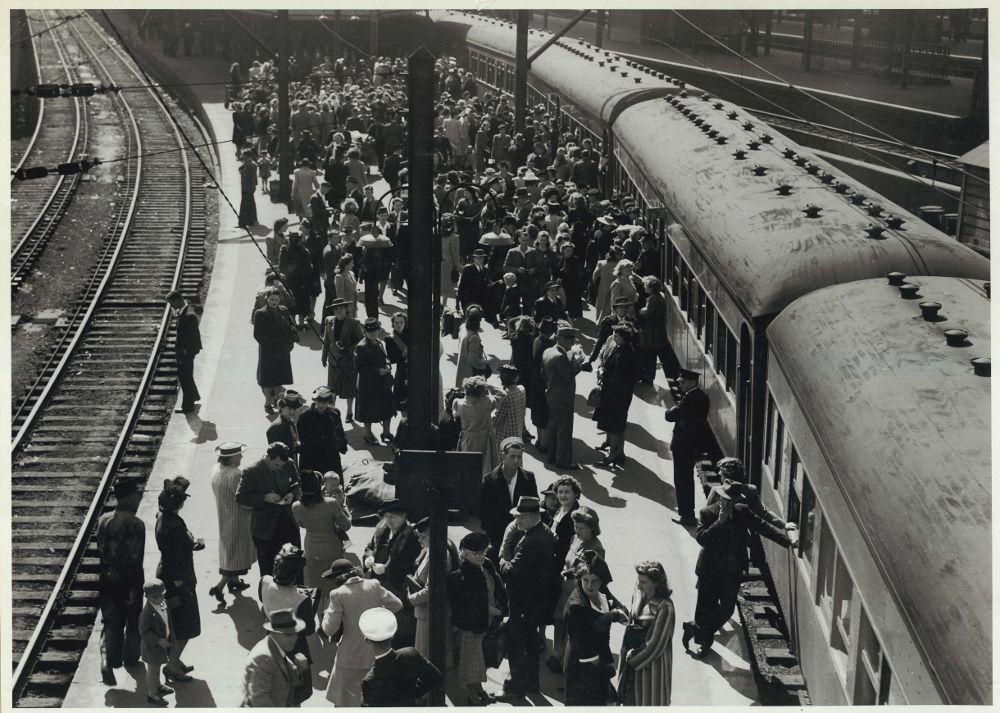
Crowds seeing off a bride train departing from Central railway station, Sydney bound for Brisbane in September 1945

In 1945 and 1946 several "bride trains" were run in Australia to transport war brides to or from ships.

These trains included:

- September 1945: A train from Perth to Brisbane, where the women and their children were to embark on a ship bound for the United States. The war brides endured cramped and uncomfortable conditions during the first leg of this trip.
- September 1945: A train travelling directly from Melbourne to Brisbane carrying 230 women and 70 children (including those who had embarked at Perth) bound for the United States.
- September 1945: A special train from Sydney to Brisbane carrying more than 254 women and 85 children bound for the United States.
- October 1945: A train carrying Canadian war brides departed Brisbane for the southern states.
- February 1946: A train carrying 495 women and children from Western Australia, South Australia and Victoria to Sydney where they boarded a ship bound for the United States.
- April 1946: A train carrying British war brides from Melbourne to Sydney
- April: A train carrying 41 women and 17 children to Brisbane where they boarded a ship bound for the United States.
- May 1946: A train carrying women and children from Perth, Adelaide, Melbourne to Sydney where they boarded a ship bound for the United States.
- June 1946: A train carrying 80 women and 46 children bound for the United States.

The 2004 single Bridal Train by The Waifs is about the experiences of women who travelled on the Bride Trains.
