= Vikki Thorn =

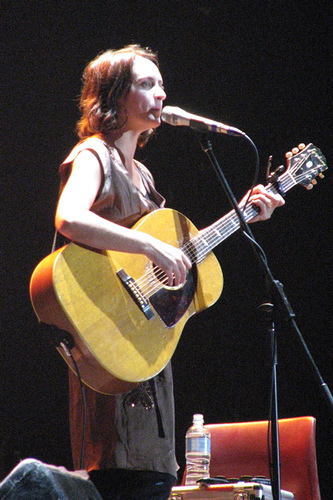
- Thorn performing with The Waifs in Perth, May 2007

Background information
- Born: Vikki Elizabeth Simpson ca. 1974; Albany, Western Australia, Australia
- Genres: Folk rock; blues
- Occupation: Musician
- Instruments: Vocals; harmonica; guitar
- Years active: 1990–present
- Label: Jarrah
- Member of: The Waifs
- Formerly of: Colours; Stray Sisters
- Spouse: Matt Thorn

Vikki Elizabeth Thorn (née Simpson, born c. 1974) is an Australian harmonica player, guitarist, vocalist, and songwriter and one-third of the Australian folk rock band the Waifs. Her elder sister, Donna Simpson, also plays guitar and sings in the group. Vikki has released eight studio albums with the Waifs, and wrote the band's singles, "Bridal Train" (2004) and "Sun Dirt Water" (2007).

Since 2021, Thorn has released music under the name Thornbird.

== Early life and education ==
Thorn and her elder sister, Donna, grew up in Albany, Western Australia. Their father, Jimmy Simpson, fished salmon in season. In an interview with Andrew Denton on Enough Rope, Thorn described the lifestyle of a fisherman's daughter:

"we played in vats of blood, and all these fish guts. Yeah, it happened sort of three months a year. And there's three families that go out there, and we're the third generation actually, so our grandfather, and our father and now us and ah the, they sit on the beach and they watch for schools of salmon coming along, and it's a very old method of fishing."

== Career ==
=== 1980s-1991: Early life ===
Thorn received a harmonica when she was a teenager, and started playing Bob Dylan songs. She harmonised Everly Brothers songs with her sister, who played guitar. They formed a blues covers duo, Colours, in Albany. On Thorn's last day of high school, aged 16, she was picked up by Simpson, in a yellow Kombi, who asked her to travel with her:

"I'd said to Vikki, you know, we should go round Australia. Let's, let's just get out of here, let's go travelling. You know, we were from this town where if we saw a car come through from over east with eastern states number plates, I mean I would just look at these cars and think wow, they're from over east. They're from Sydney and, and Wollongong and… you know and it was really exciting for us. So I bought this old van and I went and picked her up from school." – Donna Simpson, August 2007.

=== 1992-2018: The Waifs ===
Thorn and Simpson met Josh Cunningham in August 1992 in Broome, the sisters had been travelling across greater Western Australia, playing the blues in rural bars based on what a town's tourist bureau described as the music scene for that area. After less than an hour conversation with Cunningham, Simpson asked him to join them in Colours as a trio. Upon return to Albany their "grandmother said 'Oh here come the waifs'" and they decided to rename their trio as the Waifs.

The Waifs toured Western Australia from 1993 to 1996. In 1996 they moved to the east coast and made the group a serious music career. In May 1996, their self-titled debut was released, three months after it was recorded. It featured three songs from Thorn: "Circles", "I Believe", and "Company". After touring more throughout the mid-nineties, the band released Shelter Me in 1998, and Sink or Swim in 2000. Sink or Swim was released, and more touring commenced. The Waifs were now becoming an international concern, and popularity increased when Up All Night was released. Shortly after its release, the album was certified 2× platinum in Australia and two successful singles followed: "London Still" and "Lighthouse", written by Simpson and Cunningham, respectively.

At the 2004 Boxing Day tsunami relief concert, WaveAid, in January 2005 the Waifs performed with Thorn providing harmonica. Thorn's song "Bridal Train" was released as a single, by the group in 2004, and the song won the USA Songwriting Competition in 2006. The Waifs' fifth studio album, Sun, Dirt, Water (September 2007), provided a title single, which was written by Thorn.

During 2014 Thorn and Simpson undertook a side project, Stray Sisters, with Ben Franz on pedal steel and lap steel guitars (also an auxiliary bass guitarist of the Waifs). Thorn recalled "That was a real different experience for me because usually I play a minimum amount of guitar in the Waifs but when I was in the Stray Sisters I had to play more rhythm, supporting rhythm parts to what Donna was doing. So that was the good thing about it. That challenged me a little bit and I got to play electric guitar."

The group's eighth studio album, Ironbark, released in February 2017, led Thorn to reflect on their being together for 25 years, "I just sent an email the other day saying 'When the tour's over, when do we celebrate?' We need to have a party, we need to have something where we sit down and celebrate, just have a toast."

=== 2020: Vikki Thorn and the Red Tails ===
Thorn returned home to Western Australia after ten years in Utah, USA and in 2020, Thorn formed an Albany-based trio, Vikki Thorn and the Red Tails, with Simon and Tammy London and started performing solo material around Western Australia.

=== 2021-present: Thornbird ===
In July 2021, Thorn released her first material as Thornbird. The single, "Tempest" is a cinematic tale of hope and desire, told by a lonely waitress stuck in a predictable, suffocating, desolate, outback truck stop.

IN March 2022, Thornbird release her debut studio album, which debuted at number 5 on the Australian Independent Label chart.

== Personal life ==
Vikki Thorn and bandmate, Josh Cunningham, had a romantic relationship for 12 years, which according to Thorn "broke down". She also said that "Through all those years of touring, there was that dynamic going on."

Thorn wrote the Waifs song, "Sun Dirt Water" (August 2007), for her husband, Matt Thorn, "I wrote the song as a letter to him, just letting him know the things that were important to me and describing the road we were going to travel... It's the last song I wrote, and I wrote it four years ago." The couple have three children and since 2008 reside in Utah.

== Discography ==
=== Studio albums ===
List of studio albums, with selected chart positions
Title	Album details	Peak chart positions
Title	Album details	AUS Indi
Thornbird	Released: 11 March 2022; Formats: CD, digital; Label: Vikki Thorn, MGM	5

== Awards and nominations ==
=== ARIA Music Awards ===
The ARIA Music Awards is an annual awards ceremony that recognises excellence, innovation, and achievement across all genres of Australian music. They commenced in 1987.

Year	Nominee / work	Award	Result	Ref.
2022	Thornbird (as Thornbird)	Best Blues and Roots Album	Nominated	

=== Australian Women in Music Awards ===
The Australian Women in Music Awards is an annual event that celebrates outstanding women in the Australian Music Industry who have made significant and lasting contributions in their chosen field. They commenced in 2018.

Year	Nominee / work	Award	Result
2025	Vikki Thorn (with Donna Simpson)	Songwriter Award	Nominated
2025	Vikki Thorn (with Donna Simpson)	Inspiration Award	Won
