= Find Tomorrow (Ocarina) =

Single by Dimitri Vegas & Like Mike featuring Wolfpack and Katy B
- Released: 29 November 2013
- Genre: Progressive house
- Length: 4:55
- Label: Smash the House
- Songwriters: Sammy Merayah, Dimitri Thivaios, Michael Thivaios, Jeremy Dussolliet, Tim Sommers, Erin Beck
- Producers: Dimitri Vegas, Like Mike, Wolfpack

Dimitri Vegas & Like Mike singles chronology
"Stampede" (2013)	"Find Tomorrow (Ocarina)" (2013)	"G.I.P.S.Y" (2013)

Katy B singles chronology
"5 AM" (2013)	"Find Tomorrow (Ocarina)" (2013)	"Crying for No Reason" (2014)

"Find Tomorrow (Ocarina)" is a song by Belgian electronic DJ duo Dimitri Vegas & Like Mike, Wolfpack and Katy B. It was co-written by Kinetics & One Love, Erin Beck, and Belgian musician Sammy Merayah, and features vocals from UK recording artist Katy B. The single was released in Belgium as a digital download on 29 November 2013, and peaked at number 2 there. The song is a vocal version of Vegas & Mike's previous collaboration with Wolfpack, "Ocarina (The TomorrowWorld Anthem)", which was released two months earlier.

== Track listing ==
Digital download
No.	Title	Length
1.	"Find Tomorrow (Ocarina)" (Radio Edit)	3:08

Digital download - Remix
No.	Title	Length
1.	"Find Tomorrow (Ocarina)" (Bodybangers Remix)	5:41

== Chart performance ==
=== Weekly charts ===
Chart (2013–14)	Peak position
Belgium (Ultratop 50 Flanders)	2
Belgium Dance (Ultratop Flanders)	1
Belgium (Ultratop 50 Wallonia)	13
Belgium Dance (Ultratop Wallonia)	19

=== Year-end charts ===
Chart (2014)	Position
Belgium (Ultratop Flanders)	44

== Release history ==
Region	Date	Format	Label
Belgium	November 29, 2013	Digital download	Smash the House
