= Ben Weaver =

American singer-songwriter (born 1980)

- Born: 1980 (age 45–46); Eugene, Oregon, U.S.
- Genres: Rock, experimental, Americana
- Occupation: Singer-songwriter
- Instruments: Vocals, guitar, banjo
- Years active: 1999–present
- Labels: Hymie's Records; Bloodshot Records; Glitterhouse Records; Fugawee Bird Records; 30/30 Industries; Unit Three Records
- Spouse: Donna Simpson (m. 2003; div. 2009)
- Website: benweaver.net

Ben Weaver (born 1980) is an American singer-songwriter.

== Early life ==
Weaver was born in Eugene, Oregon, but spent most of his childhood in Saint Paul, Minnesota. He has a worldwide following, though his popularity is strongest in his native Midwestern United States.

Growing up in a musical household, Weaver always envisioned a career in music. After one year of college, he decided to drop out and begin traveling, an experiences that would later deeply influence his songwriting.

== Career ==
Weaver's debut album, El Camino Blues, was released in 1999 and featured Greg Brown, with input from Tony Glover. Weaver then undertook his first tour in support of the album. His second album, Living in the Ground, was recorded in a single five-hour-session and featured Bo Ramsey. His third album, Hollerin' at a Woodpecker, released in 2002, was critically acclaimed in Britain and the United States, including being named No.3 Americana album of the year by Mojo magazine. This success laid the ground for the international release of his fourth album, Stories Under Nails, in 2004, which was followed by his first international tour. Over the years, Weaver has toured with numerous artists including The Waifs and Kristin Hersh.

Weaver's 2010 album, Mirepoix and Smoke, was inspired by his time working in a Minneapolis restaurant after taking a break from recording and touring in 2009. In addition to his music, he is also a poet and fiction writer. His short story "Humanesque" was featured in the 2009 anthology Amplified: Fiction from Leading Alt-Country, Indie Rock, Blues and Folk Musicians, and his poem "Devastations" won the 2009 What Light Grand Jury Prize.

An avid bicyclist, Weaver has embraced cycling as his primary mode of transport during tours.

== Personal life ==
In 2003, Weaver married Australian musician Donna Simpson. They have one son, born in 2005. They divorced in 2009.

== Discography ==
- 1999: El Camino Blues (Unit Three Records)
- 2002: Hollerin' at a Woodpecker (30/30 Industries)
- 2003: Living in the Ground (30/30 Industries)
- 2004: Stories Under Nails (Fugawee Bird Records)
- 2007: Paper Sky (Fugawee Bird Records / Glitterhouse Records)
- 2008: The Ax in the Oak (Bloodshot Records / Glitterhouse Records)
- 2010: Mirepoix and Smoke (Bloodshot Records)
- 2014: I Would Rather Be A Buffalo (Hymie's Records)
- 2017: Sees Like a River (Ben Weaver)
