= Sink or Swim (The Waifs album) =

Sink Or Swim

Studio album by The Waifs
- Released: June 2000 (Australia); 23 July 2002 (U.S.)
- Recorded: 2000
- Genre: Folk
- Label: Jarrah

The Waifs chronology
Shelter Me (1998)	Sink Or Swim (2000)	Up All Night (2003)

Professional ratings
Review scores
Source	Rating
AllMusic	4.5/5 stars

Sink or Swim is the third album by Australian folk band The Waifs. It was released in Australia in 2000, and following their growing international success, it was released in the United States in 2002.

== Track listing ==
1. "The Waitress" (D. Simpson) - 2:19
2. "Lies" (Cunningham) - 4:15
3. "Danger" (V. Simpson) - 2:19
4. "Without You" (Cunningham) - 3:31
5. "The Haircut" (D. Simpson) - 2:29
6. "Love Serenade" (Cunningham) - 3:31
7. "Taken" (V. Simpson) - 3:30
8. "Service Fee" (D. Simpson) - 2:42
9. "A Brief History" (Cunningham) - 3:51
10. "When I Die" (Cunningham) - 2:55
11. "Sink Or Swim" (Cunningham) - 2:00

== Personnel ==
- The Waifs
  - Josh Cunningham - Electric & Acoustic Guitars, Mandolin, Vocals
  - Donna Simpson - Acoustic Guitar, Vocals
  - Vikki Simpson - Acoustic Guitar, Vocals, Harmonica
- Additional Musicians
  - Dave MacDonald - Drums, Percussion, Banjo, Additional Vocal
  - Stewart Speed - Electric & Double Bass
  - Matt Walker - Lap Steel
  - Jen Anderson - Violin
  - Phil Moriarty - Clarinet
  - Anita Quayle - Cello
  - Steven Teakle - Accordion

== Charts ==
=== Weekly charts ===
Chart (2004)	Peak position
UK Country Albums (OCC)	13
