= One Small Step =

One Small Step may refer to:

- "One small step for [a] man, one giant leap for mankind", a phrase spoken by Neil Armstrong as he became the first person to set foot on the Moon
- One Small Step (album), an album by John Butler
- One Small Step..., an album by Guy Manning
- One Small Step (novella), a 1990 novella by Reginald Hill
- One Small Step: The Story of the Space Chimps, a 2008 documentary film
- "One Small Step" (Star Trek: Voyager), an episode of the TV series
- "One Small Step", a song by Ayreon from Universal Migrator Part 1: The Dream Sequencer
- "One Small Step...", an episode (S04 E19) of the TV program EUReKA
- One Small Step (film), a 2018 Chinese-American animated short film
- one small stEP, an extended play album by American rock band Major Moment
- "One Small Step" (Doc), a 2025 episode of Doc
