= Spaghetti Western Orchestra =

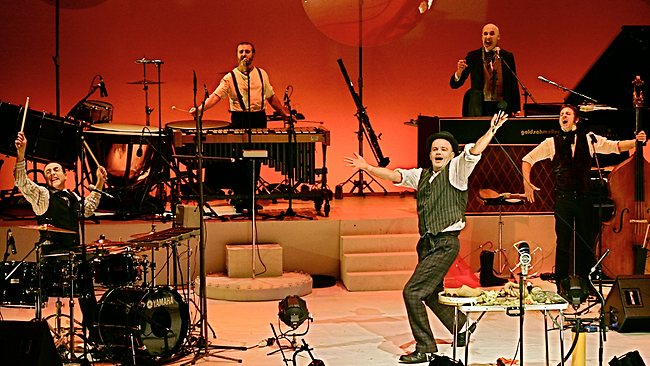
- Spaghetti Western Orchestra in the Netherlands – 2009

Background information
- Origin: Australia
- Genres: Film music, comedy
- Years active: 2004–2014
- Members: Boris Conley; Jess Ciampa; Graeme Leak; Shannon Birchall; Patrick Cronin; Denis Blais (Director)
- Past members: Dan Witton; David Hewitt; Philip McLeod
- Website: Archived 12 April 2009 at the Wayback Machine

The Spaghetti Western Orchestra, formerly the Ennio Morricone Experience, were a quintet of musicians who perform music from Spaghetti Westerns, especially the music of Ennio Morricone.

As the Ennio Morricone Experience, they performed at venues such as The Studio in Sydney. John Shand, reviewing their act in 2004, praised its inventive humour, saying that their "versatility is a constant surprise and regular source of laughs."

They premiered their current act at the Montreal Jazz Festival in 2007, were successful at the Edinburgh Festival, and have toured the world with this show in which they re-enact the music and incidents of famous Spaghetti Westerns, such as For a Few Dollars More and Once Upon a Time in the West, using a variety of unusual musical instruments such as the theremin and Foley sound effects such as a duck call.

John Lewis of The Guardian reviewed their performance at the Queen Elizabeth Hall in October 2009, saying that, while the storyline and comedy didn't work perfectly, their musicianship and the strong theme made this "an endearing, impressive show".

They performed at the Royal Albert Hall in the 2011 season of the BBC Proms on 14 August. Hugo Shirley, reviewing for the Daily Telegraph, praised their "imaginative exuberance" and observed that they were more successful in engaging the audience than the BBC Concert Orchestra, which had performed Spaghetti Western music as an encore in their earlier prom performance of film music that day.

It was announced on their Facebook page on 1 September 2014 that the group had come to the decision to no longer tour "for the foreseeable future".
