= Crying for No Reason =

2014 single by Katy B

Single by Katy B

from the album Little Red
- Released: 26 January 2014
- Recorded: 2013
- Genre: Breakstep
- Length: 4:03
- Label: Rinse; Columbia
- Songwriters: Kathleen Brien; Gordon Warren; Guy Chambers
- Producer: Geeneus

Katy B singles chronology
| "Find Tomorrow (Ocarina)" (2013) | "Crying for No Reason" (2014) | "Still" (2014) |

"Crying for No Reason" is a song by English singer Katy B, produced by Geeneus. It was released on 26 January 2014 as the second single from her second studio album, Little Red. It entered the UK Singles Chart at number five.

== Music video ==
The music video for the song was released onto Katy B's YouTube channel on 26 December 2013, lasting a total length of four minutes and three seconds. As of May 2025, the video has over 16 million views.

== Critical reception ==
Robert Copsey of Digital Spy gave the song a positive review, stating:

Now in the January/February Q1 period where exciting releases are few and far between, her latest effort 'Crying For No Reason' shines brightly in an otherwise desolate pop landscape. That's not to say the song itself - a stunning breakstep ballad about having a weepy moment for no particular reason ("I felt strong but am I breaking now?" she asks over crashing electro drums) - isn't worthy of such attention, as it really is one of the best ballads we've heard in quite some time..

== Track listing ==
Digital download - single
| No. | Title | Length |
|---|---|---|
| 1. | "Crying for No Reason" | 4:03 |

Digital download - EP
| No. | Title | Length |
|---|---|---|
| 1. | "Crying for No Reason" (Infinity Ink Remix) | 6:51 |
| 2. | "Crying for No Reason" (Morri$ Remix) | 3:20 |
| 3. | "Crying for No Reason" (Tom Shorterz Remix) | 6:05 |
| 4. | "Crying for No Reason" (KDA Remix) | 5:21 |
| Total length: | | 23:42 |

Amazon-exclusive remix
| No. | Title | Length |
|---|---|---|
| 1. | "Crying for No Reason" (KDA Blue Mix) | 5:05 |

== Personnel ==
- Kathleen "Katy B" Brien - vocals, writer
- Gordon "Geeneus" Warren - producer, instruments, writer
- Guy Chambers - writer

== Chart performance ==
The song charted at number 5 in the United Kingdom and also peaked at 21 in the Irish Charts. It is her first solo single to chart in Ireland.

== Charts and certifications ==
=== Weekly charts ===
| Chart (2014) | Peak position |
|---|---|
| Belgium (Ultratip Bubbling Under Flanders) | 4 |
| Belgium Dance (Ultratop Flanders) | 34 |
| Bulgaria (IFPI) | 4 |
| Czech Republic (Rádio – Top 100) | 84 |
| Ireland (IRMA) | 21 |
| Scotland Singles (OCC) | 5 |
| UK Singles (OCC) | 5 |

=== Year-end charts ===
| Chart (2014) | Position |
|---|---|
| UK Singles (OCC) | 63 |

=== Certifications ===
| Region | Certification | Certified units/sales |
|---|---|---|
| United Kingdom (BPI) | Gold | 400,000^{‡} |
^{‡} Sales+streaming figures based on certification alone.
