= Little Red (album) =

Studio album by Katy B
- Released: 7 February 2014
- Genres: Electronic; dance; R&B
- Length: 48:11
- Labels: Rinse; Columbia; Sony
- Producers: The Arcade; The Invisible Men; Geeneus; George FitzGerald; Joker; Route 94; Sampha; Jacques Greene; Moto Blanco; Fraser T Smith; M. J. Cole; Al Shux; Huxley

Katy B chronology
On a Mission (2011)	Little Red (2014)	Honey (2016)

Singles from Little Red
- 1. "5 AM" Released: 4 November 2013; 2. "Crying for No Reason" Released: 26 January 2014; 3. "Still" Released: 2 May 2014

Little Red is the second studio album by British singer Katy B. It was released on 7 February 2014 by Rinse, Columbia Records and Sony Music. The album includes the singles "5 AM", "Crying for No Reason" and "Still". The album is her first number 1 on the UK Albums Chart.

== Singles ==
"5 AM" was released as the lead single on 4 November 2013. It reached number 14 on the UK Singles Chart. "Crying for No Reason" was released as the album's second single on 26 January 2014. It debuted at number five on the UK Singles Chart. "Still" was released as the album's third single on 2 May 2014.

=== Other songs ===
"What Love Is Made Of" was released on 5 July 2013 and reached number 21 on the UK Singles Chart; however, the song did not make the album's final cut. "Aaliyah", originally released as part of the Danger EP, received extensive airplay on the likes of BBC Radio 1 and became part of the album.

== Promotion ==
=== Tour ===
On 12 November 2013 it was announced that Katy B will be doing a five-date UK tour. A date for London's Roundhouse in October 2014 was added on 17 January 2014. On 5 March 2014, full tour dates for October were added.

Tour dates
Date	City	Country	Venue
Leg 1, March 2014
25 March 2014	Brighton	England	Concorde 2
26 March 2014	London	England	KOKO
27 March 2014	Oxford	England	O2 Academy
28 March 2014	Birmingham	England	The Institute
29 March 2014	Manchester	England	Manchester Academy
Leg 2, October 2014
18 October 2014	Birmingham	England	O2 Academy Birmingham
19 October 2014	Nottingham	England	Rock City
20 October 2014	Southend	England	Cliffs Pavilion
21 October 2014	Bournemouth	England	O2 Academy Bournemouth
23 October 2014	London	England	Roundhouse
24 October 2014	Bristol	England	O2 Academy Bristol
25 October 2014	Manchester	England	Manchester Academy
27 October 2014	Leeds	England	O2 Academy Leeds
29 October 2014	Newcastle	England	O2 Academy Newcastle

== Critical reception ==
Professional ratings
Aggregate scores
Source	Rating
Metacritic	74/100
Review scores
Source	Rating
AllMusic	3.5/5 stars
The Daily Telegraph	5/5 stars
DIY	4/5 stars
The Guardian	3/5 stars
The Independent	3/5 stars
NME	3.5/5 stars
The Observer	3/5 stars
Pitchfork	7.8/10
Rolling Stone	4/5 stars
Slant Magazine	3.5/5 stars

The album received generally positive reviews, with an average score of 74/100 on Metacritic.

== Track listing ==
No.	Title	Writer(s)	Producer(s)	Length
1.	"Next Thing"	Kathleen Brien; The Invisible Men; The Arcade	The Invisible Men; The Arcade	3:03
2.	"5 AM"	Brien; Gordon Warren; Guy Chambers	Geeneus	3:21
3.	"Aaliyah" (featuring Jessie Ware)	Brien; Jessie Ware; Warren	Geeneus	4:38
4.	"Crying for No Reason"	Brien; Warren; Chambers	Geeneus	4:02
5.	"I Like You"	Brien; George Fitzgerald	George Fitzgerald	4:03
6.	"All My Lovin'"	Brien; Warren; Liam McLean	Joker; Geeneus (add.)	4:41
7.	"Tumbling Down"	Brien; Warren	Geeneus	4:42
8.	"Everything"	Brien; Rowan Jones	Route 94	3:47
9.	"Play" (featuring Sampha)	Brien; Sampha Sisay	Sampha	3:23
10.	"Sapphire Blue"	Brien; Jacques Greene	Greene	4:27
11.	"Emotions"	Brien; Warren; Arthur Smith; John Cohen	Geeneus; Moto Blanco	4:35
12.	"Still"	Brien; Warren; Fraser T Smith	Geeneus; Fraser T Smith	3:29
Total length:				48:11

Deluxe edition bonus tracks
No.	Title	Writer(s)	Producer(s)	Length
13.	"Blue Eyes"	Brien; Fraser T Smith; Matthew Coleman	M. J. Cole	5:17
14.	"Stay Down"	Brien; Cohen; A. Smith	Moto Blanco	3:17
15.	"Hot Like Fire"	Brien; Warren	Geeneus	3:54
16.	"Wicked Love"	Brien; Al Shuckburgh	Al Shux	4:03
17.	"Sky's the Limit"	Brien; Warren; Michael Dodman	Huxley; Geeneus (add.)	3:49
Total length:				68:31

Deluxe edition bonus disc
No.	Title	Length
1.	"Little Red" (Continuous Mix)	65:52

iTunes deluxe edition bonus tracks
No.	Title	Writer(s)	Producer(s)	Length
13.	"Blue Eyes"	Brien; Fraser T Smith; Matthew Coleman	M. J. Cole	5:17
14.	"Stay Down"	Brien; Cohen; A. Smith	Moto Blanco	3:17
15.	"Hot Like Fire"	Brien; Warren	Geeneus	3:54
16.	"Wicked Love"	Brien; Al Shuckburgh	Al Shux	4:03
17.	"Sky's the Limit"	Brien; Warren; Michael Dodman	Huxley; Geeneus (add.)	3:49
18.	"Little Red" (Continuous Mix)			65:52

Continuous Mix track listing
No.	Title	Length
1.	"Crying for No Reason"
2.	"Sapphire Blue"
3.	"I Like You"
4.	"Everything"
5.	"Tumbling Down"
6.	"Play" (featuring Sampha)
7.	"Aaliyah" (featuring Jessie Ware)
8.	"Next Thing"
9.	"Blue Eyes"
10.	"5 AM"
11.	"Sky's the Limit"
12.	"Wicked Love"
13.	"Stay Down"
14.	"All My Lovin'"
15.	"Emotions"
16.	"Hot Like Fire"
17.	"Still"

Vinyl
No.	Title	Length
1.	"Crying for No Reason"	4:02
2.	"I Like You"	4:03
3.	"All My Lovin'"	4:41
4.	"Aaliyah" (featuring Jessie Ware)	4:38
5.	"5 AM" (Route 94 Remix)	5:15
6.	"Next Thing"	3:03
7.	"Tumbling Down"	4:42
8.	"Sapphire Blue"	4:27
9.	"Play" (featuring Sampha)	3:23
10.	"Blue Eyes"	5:17
11.	"Emotions"	4:35
12.	"Sky's the Limit"	3:49

== Personnel ==
Credits adapted from Little Red album liner notes.

- Katy B – vocals
- Geeneus – engineer, producer
- DJ Zinc – engineer, keys, mixing
- The Invisible Men – engineer, producer
- Jessie Ware – vocals
- Sampha – producer, vocals
- Phil Tan – mixing
- Joey Dyer – keys, programming
- Jon Shave – keys, programming
- Jarrad Hearman – engineer, mixing
- George Fitzgerald – mixing, production
- Glenn Callaghan – keys
- Jacques Greene – producer
- Jason Pebworth – keys
- George Astaslo – programming
- Moto Blanco – producer
- Joker – producer
- Adam Harris – Guitar
- Tom Forrest – mixing
- Route 94 – producer
- Largo – engineer, producer
- Al Shux – mixing, producer
- Huxley – producer
- Fraser T Smith – producer
- Beatriz Artola – engineer
- M.J. Cole – engineer, producer
- Stuart Hawkes – mastering
- Simon Emmett – photography
- Give Up Art – art direction, design

== Chart performance ==
=== Weekly charts ===
Chart (2014)	Peak position
Australian Albums (ARIA)	100
Belgian Albums (Ultratop Flanders)	22
Belgian Albums (Ultratop Wallonia)	129
Irish Albums (IRMA)	35
Scottish Albums (Official Charts)	1
Swiss Albums (Swiss Hitparade)	61
UK Albums (Official Charts)	1

=== Year-end ===
Chart (2014)	Rank
UK Albums (OCC)	82

== Certifications ==
Region	Certification	Certified units/sales
United Kingdom (BPI)	Gold	100,000^{‡}
^{‡} Sales+streaming figures based on certification alone.

== Release history ==
Country	Release date	Format	Label
Ireland	7 February 2014	CD; digital download	Rinse; Columbia; Sony
Germany	10 February 2014	CD; digital download	Rinse; Columbia; Sony
United Kingdom	10 February 2014	CD; digital download	Rinse; Columbia; Sony
United Kingdom	19 April 2014	Vinyl	Rinse; Columbia; Sony
