= Sun Dirt Water (song) =

Single by The Waifs

from the album Sun Dirt Water
- A-side: "Sun Dirt Water"
- B-side: "Mess Around", "Trouble At My Door"
- Released: August 2007
- Genre: Folk rock
- Label: Jarrah Records
- Songwriter(s): Vikki Thorn

The Waifs singles chronology
"Bridal Train" (2004)	"Sun Dirt Water" (2007)	"Stay" (2007)

"Sun Dirt Water" is a song by the Australian folk-rock band The Waifs. It was released in August 2007, as the lead single from their fifth studio album Sun Dirt Water. "Sun Dirt Water" was written by Vikki Thorn.

At the 2007 WAM Song of the Year, the song won Professional Song of the Year.

At the APRA Music Awards of 2009, the song was nominated for Blues & Roots Work of the Year.

== Track listing ==
CD single (WAIFSCD009)

1. "Sun Dirt Water"
2. "Mess Around"
3. "Trouble At My Door"

== Charts ==
Chart (2007)	Peak position
Australia (ARIA)	32
