= Bridal Train =

Single by The Waifs

from the album A Brief History...
- Released: March 2004
- Label: Jarrah Records
- Songwriter(s): Donna Simpson
- Producer(s): Chris Thompson

The Waifs singles chronology
"Lighthouse" (2003)	"Bridal Train" (2004)	"Sun Dirt Water" (2007)

"Bridal Train" is a song by the Australian folk-rock band The Waifs. It was released in March 2004 as the lead single from their first live album, A Brief History....

The song is about the bride trains that ran from Perth to Sydney and Brisbane in 1945 and 1946 to allow Australian war brides to join their husbands in the United States.

In Australia, the song was ranked #54 on Triple J's Hottest 100 of 2004.

The song Bridal Train won the first prize in the 'Folk' category, as well as the overall first prize, in the 2006 USA Songwriting Competition.

== Synopsis ==
In a 2007 interview with Andrew Denton, Vikki Thorn explained the song:

"Yeah, my grandmother was a war bride, after the Second World War. She met Bob Cain, he was an American sailor. And they met in Perth, and after a very brief engagement, married and then he was sent away. She received a telegram at about midnight one night, saying eh pack your things, there’s a train, ah the US Navy is chartering a train to take ah war brides to Sydney, and from Sydney you can board a ship, and we’ll take you to America to be with your husbands, and I just wonder how those women must have felt as they were journeying across their country possibly for the last time you know to go and live in this, in this new place and you know with children, and you know I was…I get a bit emotional still when I sing that song."

== Track listing ==
CD single (WAIFSCD007)

1. "Bridal Train" - 4:18
2. "Strings of Steel" - 4:07
3. "Sweetness" (Live At The Athenaeum, Melbourne) - 3:25

== Charts ==
Chart (2004)	Peak position
Australia (ARIA)	50
