= Shelter Me (The Waifs album) =

Studio album by The Waifs
- Released: March 1, 1998
- Recorded: January 1998; Mixmasters Productions
- Genre: Folk
- Label: Outside Music
- Producer: The Waifs

The Waifs chronology
The Waifs (1996)	Shelter Me (1998)	Sink or Swim (2000)

Professional ratings
Review scores
Source	Rating
Allmusic	4/5 stars

Shelter Me is the second album by Australian folk band The Waifs, first released by Jarrah in March 1998.

== Track listing ==
1. "Heart Lies" (Cunningham) – 2:43
2. "People Who Think They Can" (V. Simpson) – 3:15
3. "Shelter Me" (Cunningham) – 3:05
4. "Lest We Forget" (Cunningham) – 4:54
5. "Smith St" (D. Simpson, Cunningham) – 3:40
6. "Time To Part" (V. Simpson) – 4:04
7. "Sound The Alarm" (Cunningham) – 3:37
8. "Stuck" (V. Simpson, Cunningham) – 4:01
9. "The River" (Cunningham) – 3:20
10. "Spotlight" (V. Simpson) – 5:51
11. "Attention" (Cunningham) – 2:31
12. "Bonus Track – Billy Jones (Jazz Version)" – 3:29

== Release and re-release ==
Much like The Waifs' debut album, Shelter Me was originally released in 1998 on Outside Music, but following the mainstream success of The Waifs, the album was re-released on Jarrah Records of Australia in 2003, and Compass Records of America in 2004.

== Personnel ==
=== The Waifs ===
- Josh Cunningham – guitar (acoustic), mandolin, guitar (electric)
- Donna Simpson – guitar, percussion, vocals
- Vikki Simpson – guitar, harmonica, vocals

=== Additional musicians ===
- Jen Anderson – violin, viola
- Jeff Algra – percussion, drums
- Ashley Davies – drums
- Andrew Entsch – double bass

=== Technical ===
- Don Bartley – mastering
- The Waifs – producer, design, photography
- Graham Fraser – engineer
- Adam Rhodes – engineer

=== Musical/technical ===
- Chris Dickie - percussion, engineer, mixing
