= Grand National (album) =

Studio album by John Butler Trio
- Released: 24 March 2007
- Genre: Roots rock, traditional, jam, indie rock
- Length: 59:32
- Label: Jarrah; Atlantic
- Producer: John Butler and Mario Caldato Jr.

John Butler Trio chronology
Live at St. Gallen (2005)	Grand National (2007)	April Uprising (2010)

Singles from Grand National
- 1. "Funky Tonight" Released: December 2006; 2. "Good Excuse" Released: March 2007; 3. "Better Than" Released: 23 August 2007; 4. "Used to Get High" Released: November 2007

Professional ratings
Review scores
Source	Rating
AllMusic	3/5 stars

Grand National is the fourth album by the John Butler Trio. Somewhere between 22 and 25 songs were considered for this album, some created during or before Sunrise Over Sea.

At the J Awards of 2007, the album was nominated for Australian Album of the Year.

The album reached number one on the ARIA Albums Chart and the Billboard Heatseekers chart in the US, and as of 10 March 2008 it has reached triple Platinum Status (210,000+ copies sold). Grand National was the 7th highest selling album in Australia in 2007, remaining in the ARIA top 20 album charts for over nine months.

The title of the album is derived from the antique dobro resophonic guitar that Butler inherited from his grandfather. In the 1920s the Dobro and National were competitors in the development of resonator or resophonic guitars, in 1934 they merged to form the National-Dobro Corporation, and hence the name of the album.

== Track listing ==
All music and lyrics written and arranged by John Butler.

The following track listing and song times are from the official release:

1. "Better Than" – 3:29
2. "Daniella" – 4:16
3. "Funky Tonight" – 5:27
4. "Caroline" – 3:48
5. "Good Excuse" – 3:26
6. "Used to Get High" – 4:28
7. "Gov Did Nothin'" – 8:04
8. "Groovin' Slowly" – 4:32
9. "Devil Running" – 4:49
10. "Losing You" – 3:47
11. "Nowhere Man" – 3:21
12. "Fire in the Sky" – 5:36
13. "Gonna Take It" – 4:44

The following tracks were including on the limited-edition vinyl version of the record:

1. "Good as Gone"
2. "Recognise Me" (also released as bonus track on iTunes Deluxe Album)
3. "Ain't That Just the Way"
4. "Thou Shalt Not Steal" (also released as bonus track on iTunes Deluxe Album, and previously recorded for the Kev Carmody tribute album Cannot Buy My Soul)

The following track listing and song times are from the bonus disc:

1. "Ain't That Just the Way" – 5:21
2. "Good as Gone" – 2:30
3. "Thou Shalt Not Steal" – 4:51
4. "Funky tonight (live)" – 6:00
5. "Funky tonight (video)" – 3:40

== Personnel ==
- John Butler – vocals, acoustic/amplified open back banjo, 12-string, 6-string, resonator lapsteel, and Weissonborn lapsteel guitars, baritone tricone resonator guitar, nylon string acoustic guitar, banjo, mouth harp, harmonica, ukulele (track 8), yidaki (didgeridoo) & electric guitar (track 9)
- Shannon Birchall – backing vocals, double bass, electric bass guitar, violin and string section composition and arrangement (track 4)
- Michael Barker – backing vocals, drums, shakers, tambourine, glockenspiel, marimba, congas, timbale, cow bell, timpani, vibraphone, tubular bell, crotale, vibraslap, kalimba, tongue drum, clave, cabassa, bongos, triangle, beat box (track 2)
- Danielle Caruana – backing vocals (tracks 2, 7, 11)
- Meng Jones – beat box (2)
- Chad Hedley – turntables (2)
- Money Mark – clavinet (2)
- Bobby Singh – tabla (2, 9, 12)
- Michael Caruana – piano and B3 Hammond (5), Wurlitzer (7, 8)
- Ray Pereira – talking drum (7)
- Jex Saarelaht – piano (7), Hammond organ (9)
- Vika Bull – backing vocals (7, 8)
- Linda Bull – backing vocals (7, 8)
- Stacia Goninon – backing vocals, chants & claps (7)
- Jesse Goninon – backing vocals, chants & claps (7)
- Nicky Bomba – backing vocals, chants & claps (7), Police skank (8)

Strings section on "Caroline":

- Charlotte Armstrong – violin
- Aaron Barndon – violin
- Andrea Keeble – violin
- Jane Mason – violin
- Sue Simpson – violin
- Stephanie Thom – violin
- Michelle John – cello
- Helen Mountford – cello
- Caerwen Martin – cello
- Jason Bunn – viola
- Erkki Veltheim – viola
- Sharni Williams – viola

Horns section on "Gov Did Nothin'":

- Eugene Ball – trumpet
- Mark Elton – tuba
- Ben Gillespie – trombone
- Cam Robbins – clarinet

== Singles ==
- "Funky Tonight" was released as the first Australian single (December 2006)
- "Good Excuse" was released as the second Australian single (March 2007)
- "Better Than" was released on 20 February 2007 as an online single in the United States, available via iTunes and later in Australia as a CD single in August 2007 and it served as the third single in Australia.
- "Used to Get High" was released as a radio promotional fourth single in Australia (November 2007).

== Other songs recorded during Grand National sessions ==
Before the official track list was released, these tracks were considered for the album, but were left out of the final cut.

- "Good As Gone" (released on the Funky Tonight single)
- "Recognize Me" (released as bonus with iTunes pre-order and on the "Better Than" import single)
- "Waited For You"
- "Feel Forever"
- "The Frame"
- "Happy Home"
- "On This Sad Day"
- "Start Again"
- "These Chords"
- "Tomorrow"
- "All Night Long"

== Charts ==
=== Weekly charts ===
Chart (2007–2008)	Peak position
Australian Albums (ARIA)	1
Belgian Albums (Ultratop Wallonia)	94
French Albums (SNEP)	17
New Zealand Albums (RMNZ)	14
Swiss Albums (Schweizer Hitparade)	58
US Heatseekers Albums (Billboard)	1

=== Year-end charts ===
Chart (2007)	Position
Australian Albums (ARIA)	7
French Albums (SNEP)	176

== Certifications ==
Region	Certification	Certified units/sales
Australia (ARIA)	3× Platinum	210,000^{^}
^{^} Shipments figures based on certification alone.
