= Jarrad Hearman =

UK audio recording technician

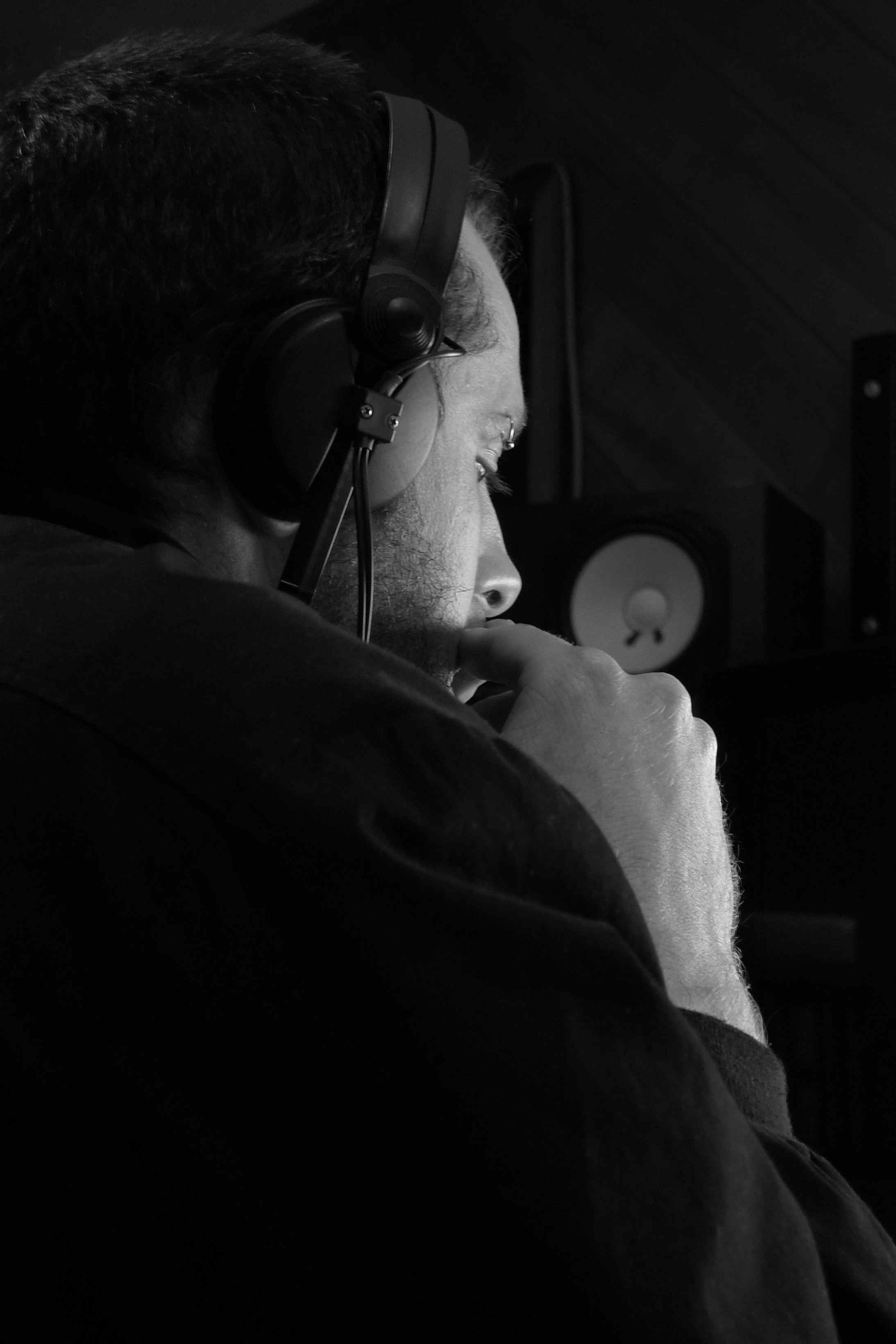

Background information
- Born: 26 June 1980 (age 45); Australia
- Genres: Pop; R&B; Grime; Dance; Rock
- Occupations: Recording, Mixing and Mastering Engineer
- Instrument: Guitar
- Years active: 2003–present
- Website: jarradhearman.com

Jarrad Hearman (born 26 June 1980) is a recording, mixing and mastering engineer, based in London, England. He has worked with artists including Katy B, Sinéad Harnett, Fetty Wap, Becky G, Nadia Rose, Tinie Tempah, Kali Uchis, Keys N Krates, Craig David, P Money, Novelist, Tinashe, Wretch 32, Ian Brown, Taj Mahal, and Toumani Diabaté.

He recorded and mixed the 2014 Katy B album, Little Red, which reached number one on the UK Albums Chart, as well as the KDA Single "Turn the Music Louder (Rumble)" which debuted at number one on the UK Singles Chart in 2015. In other roles he has worked with the likes of Jay-Z, Kanye West, The Prodigy, Will.i.am, Slipknot, John Butler, and Dirty Three, and mixed TV performances for Channel 4, the BBC, and MTV UK.

== Discography ==
- 2021 – Katy B "Peace And Offerings" EP (mixing)
- 2021 – Bklava "Autonomy" EP (mixing)
- 2021 – Sophia Amato "Glorious Mess" EP (mixing & mastering engineer)
- 2021 – Blaise x Poppy Baskcomb "Moments" Single (mixing & mastering engineer)
- 2021 – Bklava x Absolute "Fired Up" Single (mixing & mastering engineer)
- 2020 – The Bloody Mallard "Realm" Album (producer, recording & mixing engineer)
- 2020 – Sinéad Harnett "Quaranteen Queen" Single (mixing)
- 2020 – SOSA "Won't Give Up Single (mixing & mastering engineer)
- 2020 – Waze & Odyssey, George Michael, Mary J. Blige, & Tommy Theo "Always" Single (mixing & Mastering + additional production)
- 2020 – Rika "Doses" EP (mixing & mastering engineer)
- 2019 – Sinéad Harnett "Lessons In Love" Album (mixing)
- 2019 – Rika "Hold On To Me" Single (mixing & mastering engineer)
- 2019 – Blaise x Nono x Sweetie Irie "Good Body" Single (mixing & mastering engineer)
- 2019 – Salute "Conditions III" EP (mixing & mastering engineer)
- 2019 – Luke Burr "Keep On Loving" Single (mixing & mastering engineer)
- 2019 – Sinéad Harnett "Leo Bear" Single (mixing)
- 2019 – Luke Burr "Heaven" Single (mixing & mastering engineer)
- 2019 – ARUN "Y.D.E.K" Single (mixing & mastering engineer)
- 2018 – Suspect "F-About" Single (mixing & mastering engineer)
- 2018 – Nathan Dawe ft Jaykae & Br-C "Cheatin" (UKG Remix)
- 2018 – Sinéad Harnett "Lessons" Single (mixing & mastering engineer)
- 2018 – Kid Enigma & Riton (musician) "Dangerous"(mixing & mastering engineer + additional production)
- 2018 – Salute "Nostalgia '96" (mixing & mastering engineer)
- 2018 – Sinéad Harnett & JD. Reid "System" Single (mixing)
- 2018 – James Smith "T-Shirts" Single (mixing & mastering engineer)
- 2018 – Conducta ft Liv Dawson & Courage "Sleep" Single (mixing & mastering engineer)
- 2018 – James Smith "Little Love" EP (recording, mixing & mastering engineer)
- 2018 – Monro ft Flohio "Gone Clear" Single (mixing & mastering engineer)
- 2018 – Sinéad Harnett "Body" Single (mixing & mastering engineer)
- 2017 – Monro "Motion" EP (mixing & mastering engineer)
- 2017 – Kideko x Tinie Tempah x Becky G "Dum Dum" Single (mixing & mastering engineer + additional production)
- 2017 – Sinéad Harnett "Live From Jazz Cafe London" EP (mixing & mastering engineer)
- 2017 – Jarreau Vandal feat. Zak Abel "Make You Love Me" Single (mixing & mastering engineer)
- 2017 – The Magician & TCTS ft Sam Sure "Slow Motion" Single (mixing)
- 2017 – JD. Reid "Calibrate" EP (mixing & mastering engineer)
- 2017 – Fetty Wap x Blackmagic "Wonder" Single (mixing & mastering engineer)
- 2017 – Sinead Harnett "Chapter One" Album (recording, mixing & mastering engineer)
- 2017 – Friend Within x Kideko "Burnin' Up" Single (mixing & mastering engineer)
- 2017 – TCTS ft Sage The Gemini & Kelis "Do It Like Me (Icy Feet)" Single (mixing & mastering engineer)
- 2017 – Mr Mitch "Devout" Album (mixing engineer)
- 2017 – Faze Miyake "N.O.T." EP (mixing & mastering engineer)
- 2016 – Kideko & George Kwali ft Nadia Rose & Sweetie Irie "Crank It, Whoah!" Single (mixing & mastering engineer)
- 2016 – Sinead Harnett "Sinead Harnett" EP (recording, mixing & mastering engineer)
- 2016 – Lee Walker vs DJ Deeon ft. Katy B "Freak Like Me" Single (recording, mixing & mastering engineer)
- 2016 – Katy B "Honey" Album (recording, mixing & mastering engineer)
- 2016 – JD. Reid "io" EP (recording, mixing & mastering engineer)
- 2015 – Nick Brewer ft Sinead Harnett Single "Never Say Never" (recording, mixing & mastering engineer)
- 2015 – Tinie Tempah "Junk Food" Mixtape (mixing engineer)
- 2015 – Kali Uchis Ft Tory Lanes "Ridin Round" Single (mixing & mastering engineer)
- 2015 – KDA Ft Tinie Tempah & Katy B "Turn the Music Louder (Rumble)" Single (recording, mixing & mastering engineer)
- 2015 – Maxta, Boothroyd & Maniac "100 Problems" EP (recording & mixing engineer)
- 2015 – Novelist "Endz" Single (mixing engineer)
- 2015 – Novelist "War" Single (mixing engineer)
- 2015 – Faze Miyake "Faze Miyake" Album (recording & mixing engineer)
- 2015 – P Money "Money Over Everyone 2" Mixtape (recording, mixing & mastering engineer)
- 2015 – Keys N Krates ft. Katy B "Save Me" Single (recording & mixing engineer)
- 2015 – Various Artist "100 Copies Mahraganaat" Album (mixing engineer)
- 2015 – Amane "Lost Weekend" EP (recording & mixing engineer)
- 2015 – Celestial Trax "Stargate" EP (recording & mixing engineer)
- 2015 – Mellor "I Don't Know Where You’re Sleeping Tonight" Single (producer, recording & mixing engineer)
- 2014 – Laura Clock "Baby : Part 1" EP (recording & mixing engineer)
- 2014 – P Money "Originators" EP (recording & mixing engineer)
- 2014 – Sunless ’97 / Palmistry "Pure4Sure / Aia" Single (recording & mixing engineer)
- 2014 – Geeneus "ELE / Red Velvet" Single (mixing engineer)
- 2014 – Tom Shorterz "Colours" Single (mixing engineer
- 2014 – Samantha Jade "Sweet Talk" Single (recording engineer)
- 2014 – Mellor "Ruby Love" Single (producer, recording & mixing engineer)
- 2014 – Proxima "Alpha" Album (recording & mixing engineer)
- 2014 – Krystal Klear ft Yasmin "One Night Only" Single (recording & mixing engineer)
- 2014 – Jess Glynne "Right Here" Single Skream Remixes (mixing engineer)
- 2014 – Roska "Crossed Wires" EP (recording & mixing engineer)
- 2014 – Denitia And Sene "Side FX" EP (mixing engineer)
- 2014 – All About She "Go Slow" EP (mixing engineer)
- 2014 – Obe "Partners" Album (producer, recording & mixing engineer)
- 2014 – Katy B "Little Red" Album (recording & mixing engineer)
- 2013 – P Money "Round The Clock" EP (recording & mixing engineer)
- 2013 – Frictional Games "Amnesia: A Machine For Pigs" Soundtrack (mixing engineer)
- 2013 – Roska "Shocking" EP (recording & mixing engineer)
- 2013 – Jaime George "Take Me There" EP (recording & mixing engineer)
- 2013 – Brackles "Go" EP (mixing engineer)
- 2013 – Mellor "One Of The Faces" EP (producer, recording & mixing engineer)
- 2013 – Loom "Acid King City" Single (recording & mixing engineer)
- 2013 – Katy B "What Love Is Made Of" Single (recording engineer)
- 2013 – Rae Morris "From Above" EP (recording engineer)
- 2013 – P Money "Mad" Mixtape (recording, mixing & mastering engineer)
- 2012 – Katy B "Danger" EP (recording & mixing engineer)
- 2012 – Rae Morris "Grow" EP (recording engineer)
- 2012 – J:Kenzo "J:Kenzo" Album (recording engineer)
- 2012 – Mellor "In The Water" Single (producer, recording & mixing engineer)
- 2012 – Indians "4AD Sessions" (recording & mixing engineer
- 2012 – P Money "Dubsteppin" EP (recording & mixing engineer)
- 2012 – Wretch 32 "Wretchercise" Mixtape (recording & mixing engineer)
- 2012 – Bassekou Kouyate + Taj Mahal "Poye 2" Single (recording engineer)
- 2012 – Patrick Wolf "Sundark And Riverlight" Album (recording engineer)
- 2012 – Mellor "Catch Me Girl" Single (producer, recording & mixing engineer)
- 2012 – Royal T "Rinse Presents: Royal T" Album (recording & mixing engineer)
- 2012 – The Irrepressibles "Nude" Album (recording engineer)
- 2012 – Roska "Rinse Presents Vol 2" Album (recording engineer)
- 2011 – Revere & Toumani Diabaté "Love Will Never Turn Us Apart" Single (recording engineer)
- 2011 – Liam Bailey Blind Faith (Acoustic) Single (recording & mixing engineer)
- 2011 – Alex Metric ft Ian Brown "Open Your Eyes" Single (recording engineer)
- 2011 – King Mob "Force 9" Album (recording & mixing engineer)
- 2011 – Orders of the British Empire "Act II" EP (mixing engineer)
- 2010 – Slipknot "(sic)nesses :Live At Download" DVD (assistant mix engineer)
- 2010 – Roll Deep "Winner Stays On" Album (assistant mix engineer)
- 2009 – Engine Three Seven "Atmosphere" EP (producer & recording engineer)
- 2009 – Chaos Divine "Avalon" Album (producer, recording & mixing engineer)
- 2008 – Mammal (band) "The Majority" Album (recording engineer & live sound)
- 2007 – John Butler "Grand National" Album (assistant record engineer)
- 2006 – Kanye West Various Writing Sessions (assistant record engineer)
- 2006 – Jay-Z "Kingdom Come" Album (assistant record engineer)
- 2006 – Heavy Weight Champ "Lo-Fi Funeral" Album (producer, recording & mixing engineer)
- 2005 – Rolling Stones "Rain Fall Down" Single Will.I.Am Remix (assistant recording engineer)
- 2005 – Dirty Three "Cinder" Album (assistant recording & mix engineer)
- 2005 – The Whitlams "Little Cloud" Album (assistant mix engineer)

== Television and viral ==
- Katy B "Drunk In Love / Vulnerable" - Rinse Sessions
- Katy B "Tumbling Down" - Rinse Sessions
- Kwabs "Pray For Love" - Rinse Sessions
- Kwabs "Diana" / "He Loves Me" - Rinse Sessions
- Tinashe "Stunt" / "Cry Me A River" - Rinse Sessions
- Tinashe "2 On" - Rinse Sessions
- Little Dragon "Killing Me" - Rinse Sessions
- Little Dragon "Paris" - Rinse Sessions
- Fatima "Rain" - Rinse Sessions
- Fatima "Underwater" - Rinse Sessions
- Katy B "Crying For No Reason" - The Graham Norton Show
- Tom Odell "Sense" - Live Viral Version
- Tom Odell "Grow Old With Me" - Nowness Sessions
- Katy B "What Love Is Made Of" - Acoustic
