= The Waifs =

Australian folk rock band

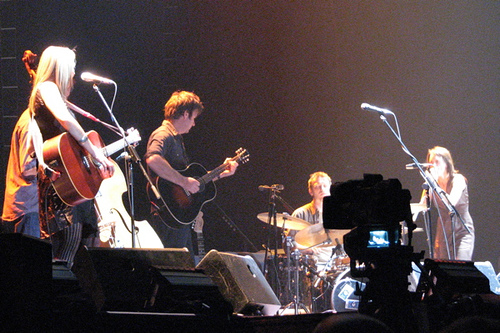
- The Waifs performing in Perth, May 2007

Background information
- Origin: Albany, Western Australia, Australia
- Genre: Folk rock
- Years active: 1992–present
- Labels: Outside, Jarrah, Compass, Hummingbird
- Members: see Members list
- Website: thewaifs.com

The Waifs (originally styled as The WAiFS) are an Australian folk rock band formed in 1992 by sisters Vikki Thorn (harmonica, guitar, vocals) and Donna Simpson (guitar, vocals) as well as Josh Cunningham (guitar, vocals). Their tour and recording band includes Ben Franz (bass), David Ross Macdonald (drums) and Tony Bourke (keyboard / piano).

The band's 2003 album Up All Night reached the top five of the Australian Albums Chart, achieving double platinum status and winning four ARIA Awards in October. Two further top five albums were issued, Sun Dirt Water in 2007 and Temptation in 2011. The Waifs have three top 50 singles, "London Still" (2002), "Bridal Train" (2004) and "Sun Dirt Water". The band supported Bob Dylan on his 2003 Australian tour and then his 2003 North American tour, including a gig at the Newport Folk Festival.

The Waifs founded the independent label Jarrah Records in July 2002, co-owned with fellow musician John Butler and their common manager Phil Stevens, which handles their Australian releases.

== History ==
=== 1992–1996: Fisherman's daughters and a farmer's son ===
The Waifs formed in August 1992 in Albany, Western Australia, as a folk rock band. The Simpson sisters, Donna and Vikki (now Vikki Thorn), had formed a duo, Colours, in Albany to perform cover versions of Bob Dylan and the Everly Brothers at local pubs. Their father, Jimmy Simpson, was a seasonal salmon fisherman at Cosy Corner beach and had bought Donna her first guitar when she was 15. In February 1992, 20-year-old Donna and her 16-year-old sister Vikki headed off in a Kombi van to tour the state as Colours. Josh Cunningham, a Moruya farmer's son, had started playing guitar in 1987, he was touring Australia playing bass guitar for a band. The Simpsons met 18-year-old Cunningham while Colours were playing twelve-bar blues in Broome. After a ten-minute jam session, Donna invited Cunningham to join Colours, Cunningham later recalled, "there was a connection that Donna felt that I felt as well ... it's always felt very much like a family to me and I felt instantly welcomed into that right from the very start". Upon return to Albany, Colours changed its name to "The Waifs" (initially styled as "The WAiFS") with Cunningham on guitars, ukulele, mandolin, dobro and vocals, Donna on vocals, guitar and tambourine and Vikki on vocals, harmonica and guitar. The Waifs used the Kombi van from 1992 to 1996 to travel to gigs across Australia.

=== 1996–2000: First three albums ===
In February 1996, the Waifs relocated to Melbourne, recorded their debut, eponymous album, The Waifs, which was released in May by independent label Outside Music. The band co-produced it with Jen Anderson and Mick Thomas of folk rock band Weddings Parties Anything. Aside from producing, Anderson was a session musician for the album. Jason MacNeill of Allmusic described The Waifs as "a more than adequate stab at troubadour folk and acoustic pop ... In some instances, the band is guilty of what can be termed funk folk, a style all too often used with little to no benefit". The group commenced a year-long tour of Australia to support the album.

Their second album, Shelter Me, was recorded in Adelaide at Mixmasters Studios and, produced by the Waifs, it was released in March 1998. MacNeill felt it was "[s]tructured in a cozy, country-like frame of harmonies and acoustic guitars, most of the album works all too well. A few songs, including the soulful "Time to Part", seem a bit askew from the others, but aren't annoying to the senses". Once again, the album was supported by a national tour.

The band released its third album, Sink or Swim, in June 2000. MacNeill states, "Abstaining from traditional folk for a more rural, quasi-country sound, the band rarely misses the mark, although "Love Serenade" is just satisfactory'. They had used David Ross Macdonald on drums and percussion – he became part of their touring band.

=== 2001–2007: Chart success and Up All Night ===
In 2001, the Waifs hired Phil Stevens as band manager – he also manages fellow West Australian musician John Butler and the John Butler Trio. The band started to play folk festivals in Canada and the United States. In August, the group made its first appearance at the Newport Folk Festival. The Newport Daily News acclaimed them as "the darlings of [that] year's festival".

In June 2002, the Waifs, Butler and Stevens founded the independent label Jarrah Records. The label was initially set up to issue both artists' material in North America, later it handled all their Australian releases. The growing international reputation of the Waifs led to the release of Sink or Swim in the US in 2002 by Jarrah Records. The Waifs first new work for Jarrah was a five-track single "London Still", which reached the top 50 on the ARIA Singles Chart. In October, "London Still" received two nominations at the ARIA Music Awards of 2002 for 'Best Independent Release' and 'Breakthrough Artist – Single'.

The Waifs fourth album, Up All Night, was released in January 2003 and debuted at No. 3. It was produced by The Waifs, Chris Thompson, Steven Schram. For the album and subsequent touring, Ben Franz played bass guitar and double bass, and dobro on the title track. The album was certified gold four weeks after release, went platinum in October 2003 and double platinum in February 2004. "Lighthouse" was released in April 2003, which was their second Top 100 single.

Vikki Simpson told The Sydney Morning Herald in October that the album's success had taken the band by surprise, "We were nonchalant about releasing albums. We'd released three already and had learned not to put too much hope behind an album because you're usually disappointed. So it was a surprise, but we took it in our stride. It was all very exciting but it didn't seem real to us because it was such a new experience."

The band supported Bob Dylan on his Australian tour in March. Dylan offered the group a support slot on his subsequent tour of North America, including a gig at the Newport Folk Festival. During the tour Donna met Ben Weaver, a United States singer-songwriter. They later married and have a son. In 2003, the band also participated in Big Day Out, an Australian travelling music festival.

At the ARIA Music Awards of 2003, the Waifs won in four categories, Best Roots and Blues Album, Best Independent Album, Producer of the Year and Engineer of the Year from eight nominations. "Lighthouse" also reached No.12 in the Triple J Hottest 100, 2003.

"Bridal Train" was released in March 2004 and made the Australian Top 50 singles charts in April. The track tells the story of the Simpsons' grandmother, a war-bride of a United States Navy sailor, Bob Cain. She boarded the "Bridal Train" from Perth to Sydney and then travelled to San Francisco to be with her husband. Thorn won the USA Songwriting Competition for "Bridal Train". The Waifs released a double live album, A Brief History..., in November which debuted in the top thirty of the Australian album charts.

A month after the Asian 2004 Boxing Day tsunami, the Waifs joined a cast of Australian artists to perform at the WaveAid concert in January 2005 in Sydney to raise funds for the relief effort. Later in 2005, they indicated that they had no immediate plans for another album, "We won't be going into the studio any time soon. Our collective focus is too outside of music and career right now to put out an album."

=== 2007–2011: Sun, Dirt, Water to Temptation ===
The Waifs at the annual Falls Festival in late 2007

The Waif's fifth studio album, Sun Dirt Water, was released in September 2007. It debuted and peaked at No. 2. Vikki had written the title song, "Sun Dirt Water", after meeting her husband. By 2007, Vikki had married Matt Thorn, lived on a farm in Utah and had two children.

The Waifs performed across Australia in September and October on the SunDirtWater Tour. It started in Broome, and ended at Legs 11, a concert for breast cancer research. In November, the group announced a collaboration with label mates, John Butler Trio, for the Union of Soul Tour in January – February 2008. The tour had five concerts, with shows in various Western Australian cities, Denmark, Margaret River, Swan Valley, and two gigs at the Fremantle Arts Centre. A second live album, Live from the Union of Soul was issued in January 2009, which peaked into the top 50. During 2009, Simpson and Weaver were divorced.

The group released their sixth studio album, Temptation, in March 2011, which peaked at No. 3. It was recorded late in 2010 in a basement studio in Minneapolis over ten days. Once again, they used the rhythm section of Franz and Macdonald. Simpson had attended rehab at Hazelden Treatment Center in Minnesota in 2008 for her alcohol addiction and wrote the album track, "Just Like Me", about her experience. As from March 2011, Thorn lives in Utah with her husband Matt and two sons, Simpson in Minneapolis with her son, Cunningham in California with his wife Jackie, Macdonald in Canada and Franz in Australia. While in Australia, Cunningham recorded his debut solo album, Into Tomorrow.

== Members ==
=== Current members ===
- Joshua Cunningham — lead guitar, mandolin, ukulele, backing and occasional lead vocals (1992–present)
- Donna Simpson — lead vocals, rhythm guitar (1992–present)
- Vikki Thorn (née Simpson) — lead vocals, harmonica, rhythm guitar (1992–present)

=== Auxiliary members ===
- David Ross Macdonald — drums, percussion (1998–present)
- Ben Franz – bass, additional guitar (2001–present)

=== Former auxiliary members ===
- Mikel Azpiroz – keyboards (2009)
- Jen Anderson – violin (1996, 1998)

== Discography ==
- The Waifs (1996)
- Shelter Me (1998)
- Sink or Swim (2000)
- Up All Night (2003)
- Sun Dirt Water (2007)
- Temptation (2011)
- Beautiful You (2015)
- Ironbark (2017)

== Awards and nominations ==
=== AIR Awards ===
The Australian Independent Record Awards (commonly known informally as AIR Awards) is an annual awards night to recognise, promote and celebrate the success of Australia's Independent Music sector.

Year	Nominee / work	Award	Result
2008	themselves	Best Independent Artists	Nominated
2008	Sun Dirt Water	Best Independent Blues and Roots Album	Nominated
2009	Live from the Union of the Soul	Best Independent Blues and Roots Album	Nominated
2017	Beautiful You	Best Independent Blues and Roots Album	Nominated
2018	Ironbark	Best Independent Blues and Roots Album	Nominated

=== APRA Awards ===
The APRA Awards are presented annually from 1982 by the Australasian Performing Right Association (APRA), "honouring composers and songwriters".

Year	Nominee / work	Award	Result
2003	"London Still" (Josh Cunningham, Donna Simpson, Vikki Thorn)	Song of the Year	Nominated
2004	"Lighthouse" (Josh Cunningham)	Song of the Year	Nominated
2009	"Stay" (Josh Cunningham, Donna Simpson, Vikki Thorn, Brett Canning)	Blues & Roots Work of the Year	Nominated
2009	"Sun Dirt Water" (Josh Cunningham, Donna Simpson, Vikki Thorn)	Blues & Roots Work of the Year	Nominated
2012	"Falling" (Josh Cunningham, Donna Simpson, Vikki Thorn)	Blues & Roots Work of the Year	Nominated
2016	"6000 Miles"	Song of the Year	Shortlisted

=== ARIA Awards ===
The ARIA Music Awards are a set of annual ceremonies presented by Australian Recording Industry Association (ARIA), which recognise excellence, innovation, and achievement across all genres of the music of Australia. They commenced in 1987. The Waifs have won four awards from nineteen nominations.

Year	Nominee / work	Award	Result
2002	"London Still"	Best Independent Release	Nominated
2002	"London Still"	Breakthrough Artist – Single	Nominated
2003	Up All Night	Album of the Year	Nominated
2003	Up All Night	Best Blues & Roots Album	Won
2003	Up All Night	Best Group	Nominated
2003	Up All Night	Best Independent Release	Won
2003	Up All Night	Breakthrough Artist – Album	Nominated
2003	Chris Thompson for Up All Night	Engineer of the Year	Won
2003	Chris Thompson for Up All Night	Producer of the Year	Won
2003	"Lighthouse"	Single of the Year	Nominated
2004	Bridal Train	Best Independent Release	Nominated
2005	A Brief History...	Best Independent Release	Nominated
2005	A Brief History...	Best Blues & Roots Album	Nominated
2008	Sun Dirt Water	Best Blues & Roots Album	Nominated
2009	Live from the Union of Soul	Best Blues & Roots Album	Nominated
2011	Temptation	Best Blues & Roots Album	Nominated
2015	Beautiful You	Best Blues & Roots Album	Nominated
2015	Beautiful You	Engineer Of The Year	Nominated
2015	Beautiful You	Producer Of The Year	Nominated

=== Australian Songwriters Hall of Fame ===
The Australian Songwriters Hall of Fame was established in 2004.

Year	Nominee / work	Award	Result
2017	themselves	Australian Songwriters Hall of Fame	inducted

=== National Live Music Awards ===
The National Live Music Awards (NLMAs) commenced in 2016 to recognise contributions to the live music industry in Australia.

Year	Nominee / work	Award	Result
2019	The Waifs	Live Country Act of the Year	Won

=== WAM Song of the Year ===
The WAM Song of the Year was formed by the Western Australian Rock Music Industry Association Inc. (WARMIA) in 1985, with its main aim to develop and run annual awards recognising achievements within the music industry in Western Australia.

Year	Nominee / work	Award	Result (wins only)
2007	"Sun Dirt Water"	Professional Song of the Year	Won

=== West Australian Music Industry Awards ===
The West Australian Music Industry Awards are annual awards celebrating achievements for Western Australian music. They commenced in 1985.

Year	Nominee / work	Award	Result
2006	Ben Franz (The Waifs)	Best Bassist	Won
2011	The Waifs	Hall of Fame	inductee
2017	The Waifs	Most Popular Act	Won

=== Other awards ===
Year	Nominee / work	Award	Result
2005	Rob Bygott (Bard Films) for "Bridal Train"	West Australian Screen Awards, Best Music Video	Won
2006	Vikki Thorn for "Bridal Train"	USA Songwriting Competition, Folk Category First Prize	Won
2006	Vikki Thorn for "Bridal Train"	USA Songwriting Competition, Overall First Prize	Won
