= London Still =

"London Stil"

Single by The Waifs

from the album Up All Night
- Released: June 2002
- Recorded: March 2002
- Venue: ABC Studios
- Genre: ABC Studios
- Label: Jarrah Records
- Songwriter(s): Donna Simpson
- Producer(s): Chris Thompson

The Waifs singles chronology
"London Stil" (2002)	"Lighthouse" (2003)

"London Still" is a song by the Australian folk-rock band The Waifs. It was released in June 2002 as the lead single from their fourth studio album Up All Night. "London Still" peaked at number 49 on the ARIA charts.

At the ARIA Music Awards of 2002, the song was nominated for Best Independent Release and Breakthrough Artist – Single. At the APRA Music Awards of 2003, the song was nominated for Song of the Year.

It placed third on Australian radio station Triple J Hottest 100, 2002 and 74th on the Triple J Hottest 100 of Australian Songs in 2025.

== Reception ==
Junkee said, "The Waifs' heartfelt, plucked ode to missing home resonated with every Australian that has ever found themselves in a far-flung, cold place somewhere across the globe. Inside Josh Cunningham's scratched and ringing guitar was the warmth of a Perth summer's day, as Australian as a crinkled eucalyptus leaf."

== Track listing ==
CD single (WAIFSCD004)

1. "London Still" - 3:42
2. "Crazy Train" - 4:51
3. "Lies" - 4:13
4. "Here If You Want" - 3:50
5. "Jealousy" - 2:59

== Charts ==
Chart (2002)	Peak position
Australia (ARIA)	49
