= Josh Cunningham =

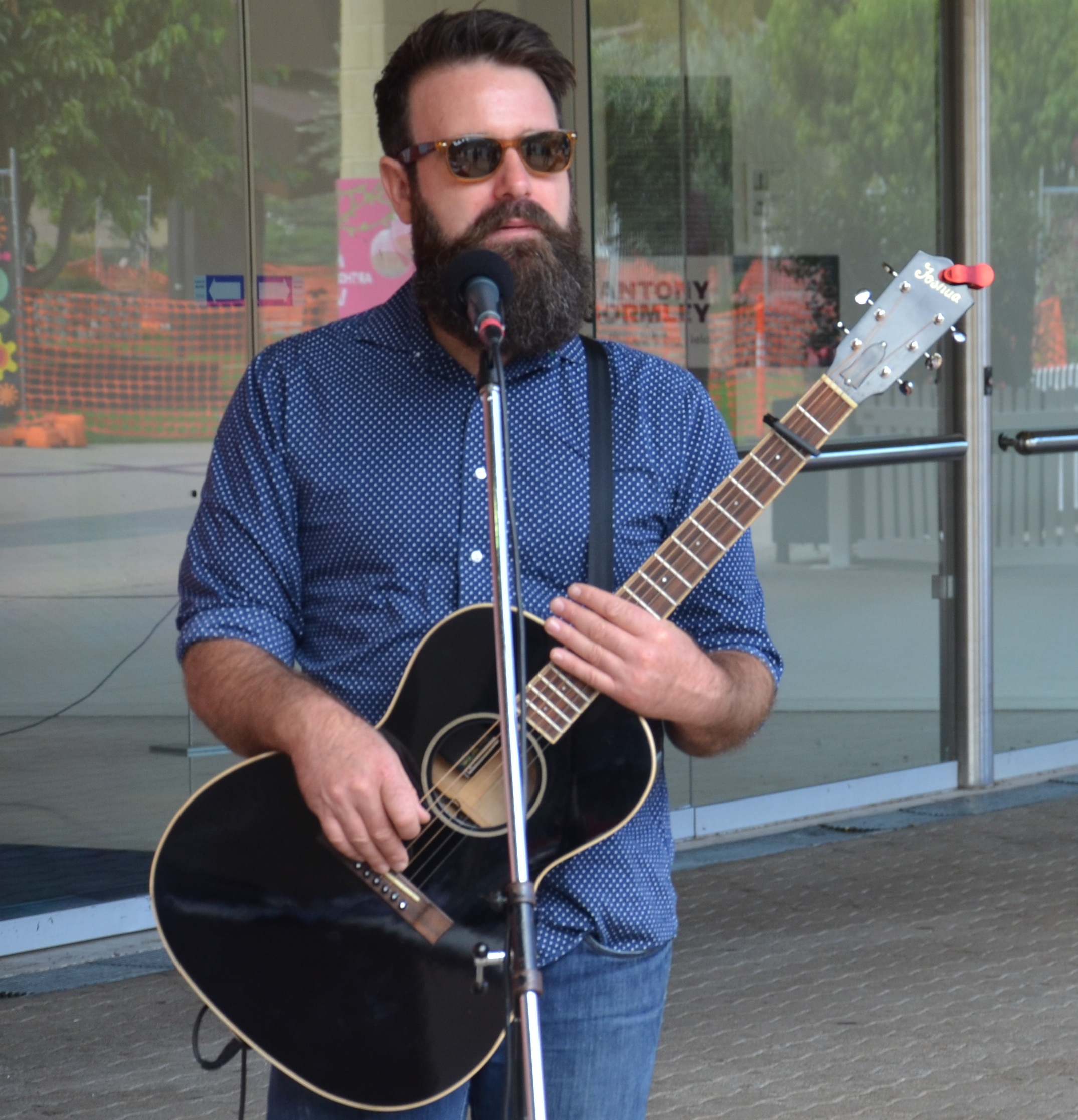
- Cunningham in March 2017

Background information
- Born: Joshua Hayden Cunningham; Moruya, New South Wales, Australia
- Genre: Folk rock
- Occupations: Guitarist, singer-songwriter
- Instruments: Guitar, ukulele, mandolin, dobro, banjo
- Years active: 1987–present
- Label: Jarrah Records ABC Music

Joshua Hayden Cunningham is an Australian guitarist, vocalist and songwriter. He is a founding member of folk rock band The Waifs, and one-half of folk and country duo Felicity Urquhart and Josh Cunningham. Collectively, Cunningham has been awarded four ARIA Awards, three CMAA Golden Guitar Awards, one AIR Award, and was inducted into the Australian Songwriters Association Hall of Fame in 2017.

Cunningham was also a member of Missy Higgins's backing band for the first three years of her career, and performed on her album On a Clear Night.

He has constructed some of the guitars he plays, both acoustic and electric.

== Early life ==
Cunningham grew up on a farm in Moruya, New South Wales. His family were poor and lived in a one-room shack without power or modern conveniences, and yet he describes a loving and secure upbringing that taught him the value of what is truly important in life .

"Many would use the word 'underprivileged' to describe the way I grew up, but I regard it as a privilege – more and more as I've gotten older."

At the age of 13, he was inspired to pick up the guitar after seeing Michael J Fox's (aka Marty McFly) spirited rendition of Johnny B Goode in the 1985 movie "Back to The Future".

== Career ==
=== The Waifs (1992–present) ===
Cunningham met Donna and Vikki Simpson while the two sisters played gigs in Broome, in 1992. At the time, Cunningham was playing bass guitar in an all-male band. Donna Simpson described, on The Waifs' official website, how they met:

"We jammed for about 10 minutes and I asked him to join the band and he said "ok"... Just like that, and we became The Waifs."

In 2003, they became an "overnight sensation" when they picked up four ARIA awards for their album Up All Night and had radio success with several of the tracks from that album including "London Still" and "Lighthouse Man".

The Waifs have opened for and shared stages with many high-profile artists along the way, most notably being personally invited by Bob Dylan to join him for over thirty shows in the US in 2003.

=== Felicity Urquhart & Josh Cunningham (2000–present) ===
In 2020 Cunningham teamed up in music and in life with Australian country music star Felicity Urquhart. Their ARIA and 4 times Golden Guitar-nominated debut album The Song Club, blended Cunningham's signature folk/roots sound with Felicity's country leanings and established the duo as a potent musical force.

Described by The Australian's Phil Stafford as "Australia's first couple of folk-country," Urquhart and Cunningham topped the pool at the 2024 Golden Guitar Awards for both nominations (six) and wins (three) for their follow up album Birdsong, released in September 2023.

== Discography ==
=== Studio albums ===
Title	Details	Peak chart positions
Title	Details	AUS
Into Tomorrow	Release date: 2011; Label: Format: CD, DD	—
The Song Club (with Felicity Urquhart)	Release date: 7 May 2021; Label: ABC Music/Universal Music (3595271); Format: CD, DD, streaming	77
Birdsong (with Felicity Urquhart)	Released: 29 September 2023; Label: ABC Music/Universal Music; Format: CD, digital	—
Everything Around You (with Felicity Urquhart)	Release date: 6 March 2026; Label: ABC Music; Format: CD, DD, streaming	85

== Awards and nominations ==
=== AIR Awards ===
The Australian Independent Record Awards (commonly known informally as AIR Awards) is an annual awards night to recognise, promote and celebrate the success of Australia's Independent Music sector.

Year	Nominee / work	Award	Result
2022	The Song Club (with Felicity Urquhart)	Best Independent Country Album or EP	Won

=== ARIA Music Awards ===
The ARIA Music Awards is an annual ceremony presented by Australian Recording Industry Association (ARIA), which recognise excellence, innovation, and achievement across all genres of the music of Australia. They commenced in 1987.

Year	Nominee / work	Award	Result	Ref.
2021	The Song Club (with Felicity Urquhart)	Best Country Album	Nominated	

=== Country Music Awards of Australia ===
The Country Music Awards of Australia is an annual awards night held in January during the Tamworth Country Music Festival. Celebrating recording excellence in the Australian country music industry. They commenced in 1973.

Year	Nominee / work	Award	Result	Ref.
2022	Felicity Urquhart & Josh Cunningham	Group or Duo of the Year	Nominated	
2022	The Song Club	Alt. Country Album of the Year	Nominated	
2022	The Song Club	Album of the Year	Nominated	
2022	"Spare Parts"	Video of the Year	Nominated	
2023	"Bogswamp" (written by Josh Cunningham) – Recorded by Felicity Urquhart & Josh Cunningham	Heritage Song of the Year	Nominated	
2024	Birdsong (with Felicity Urquhart)	Album of the Year	Nominated	
2024	Birdsong (with Felicity Urquhart)	Traditional County Album of the Year	Won	
2024	"Size Up" (with Felicity Urquhart)	Single of the Year	Won	
2024	"Size Up" (with Felicity Urquhart)	Song of the Year	Won	
2024	"Size Up" (with Felicity Urquhart) (dir. Duncan Toombs & The Filmery)	Video of the Year	Nominated	
2024	Josh Cunningham & Felicity Urquhart	Group or Duo of the Year	Nominated	
2026	Josh Cunningham & Felicity Urquhart	Group or Duo of the Year	Nominated	
2027	"Riverside" (with Felicity Urquhart)	Heritage Song of the Year	Pending	
2027	Josh Cunningham & Felicity Urquhart	Group or Duo of the Year	Pending	
2027	Everything Around You (with Felicity Urquhart)	Traditional Country Album of the Year	Pending	
2027	Everything Around You (with Felicity Urquhart)	Album of the Year	Pending	
