= Donna Simpson (musician) =

Australian guitarist and singer-songwriter

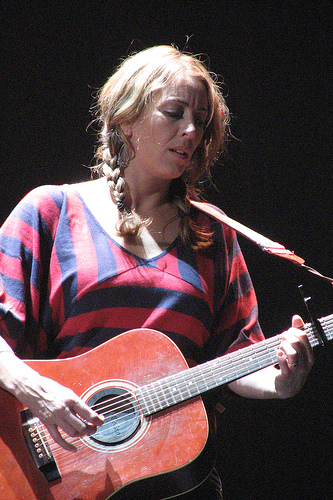
- Simpson performing with The Waifs on 18 May 2007 in Brisbane, Queensland

Background information
- Born: 1970 (age 55–56); Albany, Western Australia, Australia
- Genre: Folk rock
- Occupations: Singer-songwriter, guitarist
- Instruments: Vocals, guitar, tambourine
- Label: Jarrah Records
- Spouse: Ben Weaver (m. 2003; div. 2009)

Donna Simpson (born 1970) is an Australian guitarist, vocalist and songwriter. She is a member of the Australian folk rock band The Waifs, alongside her younger sister Vikki Thorn (née Simpson), who plays harmonica and sings in the band. Simpson has released six albums with The Waifs, and wrote the single "London Still", one of the band's most successful releases.

== Personal life ==
In 2003, Simpson married Ben Weaver, an American singer-songwriter. Together they had one son, born in 2005. The couple divorced in 2009.

In 2012, Simpson moved back to Western Australia. She had two further sons, born in 2012 and 2013, and lives in Fremantle.

== Discography ==
For releases with her band, see The Waifs.

=== Guest appearances and collaborations ===
- John Dee Holeman & the Waifs Band (John Dee Holeman & The Waifs Band) (2007)

== Awards and nominations ==
=== Australian Women in Music Awards ===
The Australian Women in Music Awards is an annual event that celebrates women in the Australian music industry who have made significant and lasting contributions in their chosen field. The awards commenced in 2018.

Year	Nominee / work	Award	Result
2025	Donna Simpson (with Vikki Thorn)	Songwriter Award	Nominated
2025	Donna Simpson (with Vikki Thorn)	Inspiration Award	Won
