= Jarrah Records =

Australian record label

- Founded: 2002
- Founder: John Butler, Josh Cunningham, Donna Simpson, Philip Stevens, Vikki Thorn
- Distributor: MGM Distribution
- Genre: Various
- Country of origin: Australia
- Location: Perth, Western Australia
- Official website: www.jarrahrecords.com

Jarrah Records is an independent Australian record label which releases material by Western Australian-formed bands, John Butler Trio and the Waifs, and their members. In July 2002 the label was founded and co-owned by John Butler; The Waifs' members Josh Cunningham, Donna Simpson, and her sister Vikki Thorn; and the artists' common manager, Philip Stevens. Initially it was established to handle their releases for the territory of the United States by 2003 it expanded. Jarrah Records has won numerous Western Australian Music Industry Awards and was the first artist-owned independent label to debut at No.1 on the ARIA album charts.

== History ==
Jarrah Records' founders are John Butler (leader of John Butler Trio); The Waifs' band members Josh Cunningham, Donna Simpson, and her sister Vikki Thorn; and the artists' common manager, Philip Stevens. The label was established in Fremantle in July 2002, initially, to release John Butler Trio and the Waif's material into the United States market. The Waifs had formed in 1992 as a folk rock band in Albany by Cunningham, Simpson and Thorn. Butler initially performed as a busker in Fremantle in mid-1996. Since the mid-1980s Stevens was involved in the local music scene, he became a music promoter and by 1996 was the owner of Mojo's Bar in North Fremantle. In 1998 Stevens gave Butler a regular Tuesday night gig at his venue and soon became the artist's manager. Also that year Butler formed his trio as a roots and jam band. In 2001, the Waifs hired Stevens as their manager. In the following year both groups were due to tour the US and wanted to release material into that market on their own independent label.

Butler explained in 2008 that

"We never set out to do that. We just did it because of … our passion for what we wanted to do and the fact that we just had to. No one wanted to talk to us until we sold gold, so it was a little too late and a little bit too obvious what their interests were. So we did it because we had to do it that way. It was hard to find a team that was willing to believe in something that was out of the norm, so we made our own team. We saw the people liked it; it was just the industry who didn’t have the foresight."

— John Butler

In July 2002, Jarrah Records re-issued the Waifs third studio album, Sink or Swim, into the US – it had appeared in Australia in June 2000. The group's first new work for Jarrah was a five-track extended play, London Still, released in July 2002, which reached the top 50 on the ARIA Singles Chart. In October London Still received two nominations at the ARIA Music Awards of 2002 for 'Best Independent Release' and 'Breakthrough Artist – Single'. In February the following year John Butler Trio issued a 2× CD live album, Living 2001–2002, on the label for the Australian market. It peaked at No. 6 on the ARIA Albums Chart. According to The Age's Patrick Donovan by March 2004 John Butler Trio and the Waifs had "proved that mainstream airplay and huge sales are not reliant on the backing of a big record company". In March 2004 John Butler Trio released their third studio album, Sunrise Over Sea, on the Jarrah label. The album debuted at number one in the Australian album charts on 15 March 2004 and achieved gold record status in its first week of release. It was the first fully independent album (independent label/independent distributor) to debut at number 1 on the Australian Record Industry Association (ARIA) albums chart. Sunrise Over Sea went on to achieve five-times platinum sales. The label continued to issue work by both acts, including subsequent solo material from Butler and Cunningham.

== Awards ==
=== West Australian Music Industry Awards ===
The West Australian Music Industry Awards (WAMIs) are annual awards presented to the local contemporary music industry, put on annually by the Western Australian Music Industry Association Inc (WAM). The Panda Band won three awards.

Year	Nominee / work	Award	Result (wins only)
2005	Jarrah Records	Best WA Based Record Label	Won
2006	Jarrah Records	Best WA Based Record Label	Won
2007	Jarrah Records	Best WA Based Record Label	Won
2008	Jarrah Records	Best WA Based Record Label	Won
2011	Jarrah Records	Best WA Based Record Label	Won

== See also ==
- List of record labels
