= Xavier Rudd discography =

- Studio albums: 10
- EPs: 5
- Live albums: 9

The discography of Australian multi-instrumentalist Xavier Rudd, consists of 10 studio albums, 9 live albums and 5 extended plays.

== Albums ==
=== Studio albums ===
List of albums, with selected chart positions, sales figures and certifications
Title	Details	Peak chart positions						Certifications
Title	Details	AUS	BEL	GER	NLD	SWI	UK download	Certifications
To Let	Released: 2002; Label: Salt. X (Salt001), UMA (9818679); Formats: CD, 2×LP (2015)	—	—	—	—	—	—	
Solace	Released: 28 March 2004; Label: Salt. X, UMA (9818584); Formats: CD, LP (2014)	13	—	—	—	—	—	ARIA: Platinum
Food in the Belly	Released: 28 October 2005; Label: Salt. X (Salt005), UMA (9874506), Anti- (6831-2); Formats: CD, digital	16	97	—	56	—	35	ARIA: Gold
White Moth	Released: 2 June 2007; Label: Salt. X, Anti- (6869-2); Formats: CD, digital, LP (2015)	6	—	—	—	—	—	AUS: Gold
Dark Shades of Blue	Released: 16 August 2008; Label: Salt. X, Anti- (6875-2); Formats: CD, digital, LP (2015)	5	94	—	—	—	—	
Koonyum Sun (with Izintaba)	Released: 19 April 2010; Label: Salt. X (Salt150), UMA (2735425); Formats: CD, digital, 2×LP	6	—	—	—	—	—	
Spirit Bird	Released: 8 June 2012; Label: Salt. X, UMA (3704825) SideOneDummy Records (SD1494); Formats: CD, digital, 2×LP	2	119	—	38	85	—	
Nanna (with The United Nations)	Released: 17 March 2015; Label: Salt. X (4717487); Formats: CD, digital, 2×LP	8	108	—	—	74	—	
Storm Boy	Released: 25 May 2018; Label: Salt. X, Warner (5419700649); Formats: CD, digital, 2×LP	6	35	—	92	31	—	
Jan Juc Moon	Released: 25 March 2022; Label: Salt. X (XR10CD); Formats: CD, digital, 2×LP	6	46	93	—	49	—	

=== Live albums ===
List of albums, with selected chart positions, sales figures and certifications
Title	Details	Peak chart positions			Certifications
Title	Details	AUS	BEL	NLD	Certifications
Live in Canada	Released: 2001; Label: Xavier Rudd; Formats: CD; Note: Recorded in March 2001	—	—	—	
Live at the Grid	Released: December 2002; Label: Salt. X (0067); Formats: CD	—	—	—	
Good Spirit	Released: April 2005; Label: Salt. X (9871129); Formats: CD, DVD, digital	29	—	—	ARIA: Gold (DVD)
Live Bonnaroo 11 June 2005	Released: 2005; Label: Salt. X; Formats: digital	—	—	—	
Live Bonnaroo 16 June 2007	Released: 2007; Label: Salt. X; Formats: digital	—	—	—	
Live in Brussels	Released: 2009; Label: Salt. X; Formats: digital	—	—	—	
Live at the Melbourne Zoo (with Bobby Alu)	Released: 15 February 2014; Label: Salt. X; Formats: CD, digital	—	—	—	
Live in the Netherlands	Released: 24 February 2017; Label: Salt. X (5729914); Formats: 2×CD, 3×LP, digital	24	40	108	
Live in Belgium	Released: 31 December 2024; Label: Salt. X; Formats: digital	—	—	—	

=== EPs ===
List of EPs, with selected details
Title	Details
Scattered Minds	Released: 1998; Label: Xavier Rudd (SJE 02)
Xavier and the Hum (as Xavier and the Hum)	Released: October 1999; Label: Xavier Rudd
3 (as Xavier and the Hum)	Released: 2000; Label: Xavier Rudd
Freedom Sessions	Released: 29 March 2024; Label: Salt. X
Where to Now	Released: 10 September 2025; Label: Salt. X

=== Charted or certified singles ===
List of charted or certified singles
Title	Year	Chart positions				Certification	Album
Title	Year	ITA	GER	NLD	UK	Certification	Album
"Let Me Be"	2003	—	—	—	—	ARIA: Platinum	Solace
"Messages"	2005	—	—	—	—	ARIA: Gold	Food in the Belly
"Better People"	2007	—	—	—	—	ARIA: Gold	White Moth
"Come Let Go"	2007	—	—	—	—	ARIA: Gold	White Moth
"Follow the Sun"	2012	—	—	24	56	ARIA: 5× Platinum; RMNZ: Platinum	Spirit Bird
"Spirit Bird"	2012	—	—	—	—	ARIA: Platinum	Spirit Bird
"Follow the Sun" (Time Square featuring Xavier Rudd)	2014	20	77	100	—		Non-album single
"Stoney Creek"	2021	—	—	—	—	ARIA: Gold	Jan Juc Moon
"We Deserve to Dream"	2021	—	—	—	—	ARIA: Gold	Jan Juc Moon
