= Live in the Netherlands (Xavier Rudd album) =

Live album by Xavier Rudd
- Released: 24 February 2017
- Recorded: 3 May 2016
- Studio: TivoliVredenburg, Utrecht, Netherlands
- Length: 109:54
- Label: Salt. X Records

Xavier Rudd chronology
Nanna (2015)	Live in the Netherlands (2017)	Storm Boy (2018)

Live in the Netherlands is a live album by Australian multi-instrumentalist Xavier Rudd. It was recorded in May 2016 and released on 24 February 2017. The album peaked at number 24 on the ARIA Charts.

Upon release, Rudd said "Live in the Netherlands kind of just fell together pretty organically.The tour in Europe was sold out and pumping and Bobby (Alu), Ant (Eggs) and I were really on top of our game. The energy at the shows was huge and there was a really strong thread of positive intention running through the communities. We had an opportunity to record the last two nights in Utrecht, which I thought would be a good idea mainly for a reference for us to document where we were at. When I listened back to it I felt like we captured some magic particularly on the last night and I’m happy to share, what I feel is the best live product I’ve released to this point in my career."

== Reception ==
Stu Kelly from The Melomaniacs said "The beautiful collection is intensely explored as it's not uncommon for the trio to break away from each song's structure and improvise spontaneously in the live atmosphere. The crowd is fully enthralled and rich with energy in the recording and at times Rudd drops a free-form jam for a call and release with the crowd. The energy bounced back and forth from the stage and the audience in the most beautiful way that even the listener at home can feel the impact of the ritualistic relationship."

== Track listing ==
- all tracks written by Xavier Rudd, except where noted
1. "Flag" - 6:03
2. "Come Let Go" - 8:46
3. "Food in the Belly" - 4:31
4. "The Mother" - 9:00
5. "While I'm Gone" - 3:22
6. "Come People / Sacred" - 8:05
7. "Breeze" (intro) - 4:01
8. "Breeze" - 6:20
9. "No Woman No Cry" (Bob Marley and Vincent Ford) - 5:20
10. "Messages" - 4:54
11. "The Letter" - 4:27
12. "Bow Down" - 6:35
13. "Follow the Sun"" - 7:03
14. "Rise Up" - 1:50
15. "Creancient" - 11:11
16. "Let Me Be" - 4:38
17. "Solace" - 4:51
18. "Spirit Bird" - 9:02

== Charts ==
Weekly chart performance for Live in the Netherlands
Chart (2017)	Peak position
Australian Albums (ARIA)	24
Belgian Albums (Ultratop Flanders)	40
Belgian Albums (Ultratop Wallonia)	155
Dutch Albums (Album Top 100)	108
