= Live in the Netherlands =

Live in the Netherlands may refer to:

- Live in the Netherlands (Charlie Peacock album), 1999
- Live in the Netherlands (David S. Ware album), 2001
- Live in the Netherlands (Xavier Rudd album), 2017
