= Nine Mile (band) =

Canadian indie rock band

- Origin: Kitchener-Waterloo, Ontario, Canada
- Genres: Indie rock
- Years active: 2001–2010
- Labels: Universal, Xiola, Dreadrock
- Past members: Trevor Norris; Joshua Cowan; Dave Matthews

Nine Mile was a Canadian indie rock band from Kitchener-Waterloo, Ontario, active from 2001 to 2010. The band was founded by D'Ari Pouyat and Trevor Norris, with the original line-up including drummer Joshua Cowan and bassist Dave Matthews. The band's debut album, Run, was recorded by this line-up, with percussionist Dave Tolley contributing as a session musician. Shortly after, Tolley became a permanent member of the band.

== History ==
The original line-up performed extensively for two years, including a Canadian national tour, before disbanding. Trevor Norris, Joshua Cowan, and Dave Matthews left the band, while Tolley moved to Boston to study at Berklee College of Music. Pouyat remained in Toronto, continuing to work on material and collaborating with Tolley remotely.

Nine Mile evolved as a collaboration between Pouyat and Tolley. Performing mainly as a duo, they released their second album, Close to Touch, in 2003. Between 2003 and 2006, the pair toured extensively, performing at festivals and concerts across Canada, the United States, Australia, and New Zealand.

In 2007, the duo took a hiatus. Tolley became the full-time drummer for Xavier Rudd, while Pouyat relocated to the Canadian countryside. This led to the creation of Nine Mile's third album, Country Porno Electric Fireplace, released in 2009.

Over the years, Nine Mile toured internationally, sharing stages with other artists including The Black Keys, Joel Plaskett, Xavier Rudd, G. Love & Special Sauce, Sarah Harmer, and Donavon Frankenreiter. The band operated under their self-owned indie label, Dreadrock Records, which licensed their music to Liberation/Warner Australia and Entak/Universal Japan.

== Discography ==
- Run EP (2001)
- Run (2001)
- Glance EP (2003)
- Close to Touch (2003)
- The Almanac EP (2006)
- Country Porno Electric Fireplace (2009)
- Summer EP (2010)
