= Good Spirit =

Live album by Xavier Rudd

Live album by Xavier Rudd
- Released: 11 April 2005 (Australia)
- Recorded: The Enmore Theatre (14 August 2004); The Palais (19 August 2004); Fly-by-Night Club (21 August 2004)
- Genre: Roots; Alternative
- Label: Salt. X
- Producer: Todd Simko

Xavier Rudd chronology
Solace (2004)	Good Spirit (2005)	Food in the Belly (2005)

Good Spirit is the third live album from Australian roots musician Xavier Rudd. It was released in Australia on 11 April 2005.

The album was album recorded from various gigs around Australia: The Enmore Theatre in Sydney on 14 August 2004; The Palais, Melbourne on 19 August 2004 and at the Fly-by-Night Club in Fremantle on 21 August 2004.

== Track listing ==
All tracks are written by Xavier Rudd.

No.	Title	Length
1.	"Yirra Kurl"
2.	"Messages"
3.	"Let Me Be"
4.	"4th World"
5.	"Green Spandex"
6.	"12th of September"
7.	"Conceal Me"
8.	"Solace"
9.	"Shelter"
10.	"GBA"
11.	"Chances"
12.	"One Short Story"
13.	"To Let"

== Charts ==
Chart (2005)	Peak position
Australian Albums (ARIA)	29

== Certifications ==
Region	Certification	Certified units/sales
Australia (ARIA)	Gold	7,500^{^}
^{^} Shipments figures based on certification alone.
