= Dave Tolley =

Canadian hand percussionist and drummer (born 1961)

David Tolley
- Born: 1961 (age 64–65); Kitchener, Ontario, Canada
- Occupation: Percussionist
- Formerly of: Nine Mile
- Website: www.davetolley.com

Dave Tolley (born 1961, Kitchener, Ontario) is a Canadian hand percussionist and drummer. He studied at York University in Toronto and Berklee College of Music in Boston. He is best known for his involvement with Canadian band Nine Mile. He often plays a cajon, as well as drumkit, and a variety of hand percussion. His playing is featured on all four Nine Mile albums, and he played on Xavier Rudd's Food in the Belly album. Tolley's drumming and percussion work can also be found on Rudd's June 2007 release, White Moth.
