= Koonyum Sun =

Studio album by Xavier Rudd
- Released: 19 April 2010
- Studio: Studios 301 in Byron Bay, Australia
- Label: Salt. X, Universal Music
- Producer: Xavier Rudd

Xavier Rudd chronology
Dark Shades of Blue (2008)	Koonyum Sun (2010)	Spirit Bird (2012)

Professional ratings
Review scores
Source	Rating
AllMusic	4/5 stars

Koonyum Sun is the sixth studio album by Australian multi-instrumentalist Xavier Rudd released 19 April 2010. The song peaked at number 6 on the ARIA Charts.

== Musical style ==
Koonyum Sun shows Rudd returning to the Blues and roots feel of White Moth. The album is credited to the trio of Xavier Rudd and Izintaba. It is his first album with the contributions of bassist Tio Moloantoa and percussionist Andile Nqubezelo.

== Track listing ==
All tracks are written by Xavier Rudd.

No.	Title	Length
1.	"Sky to Ground"	4:28
2.	"Set Me Free"	3:54
3.	"Fresh Green Freedom"	4:00
4.	"The Reasons We Were Blessed"	1:45
5.	"Love Comes and Goes"	3:25
6.	"Soften the Blow"	5:11
7.	"Koonyum Sun"	5:58
8.	"Time to Smile"	3:34
9.	"Woman Dreaming"	5:04
10.	"Breeze"	3:29
11.	"Yandi"	3:36
12.	"Bleed"	3:31
13.	"Badimo"	5:46

== Personnel ==
- Warne Livesey – mixing
- Bob Ludwig – mastering
- Ken Turta – recording
- Terry Murray – engineering
- Anthony Lycenko – studio assistant
- Ben Mannaa – studio assistant
- James Looker – production manager, instrument technician, banjo on "Time to Smile"
- Oneill Steyn – drum technician
- Xavier Rudd – producer, vocals, harmonica, guitar (acoustic), guitar (electric), slide guitar, didgeridoo
- Tio Moloantoa – bass guitar, vocals
- Andile Nqubezelo – drums, vocals
- Renee Simone – vocals on "Bleed"
- Joaquin Rudd – vocals on "Koonyum Sun"
- Travis Page – vocals on "Badimo"

== Charts ==
Chart performance for Koonyum Sun
Chart (2010)	Peak position
Australian Albums (ARIA)	6
