= Freedom Suite =

Freedom Suite may refer to:

- Freedom Suite (The Rascals album), 1969
- Freedom Suite (Sonny Rollins album), 1958
- Freedom Suite (David S. Ware album), 2002
