= Jan Juc Moon =

Studio album by Xavier Rudd
- Released: 25 March 2022
- Recorded: Bloodwood Studios, Queensland.
- Length: 69:42
- Label: Salt. X Records
- Producer: Xavier Rudd

Xavier Rudd chronology
Storm Boy (2018)	Jan Juc Moon (2022)	Live in Belgium (2024)

Singles from Jan Juc Moon
- 1. "Stoney Creek" Released: 18 June 2021; 2. "We Deserve to Dream" Released: 24 September 2021; 3. "Ball and Chain" Released: 20 January 2022

Jan Juc Moon is the tenth studio album by Australian multi-instrumentalist Xavier Rudd. It was announced in January 2022 alongside the album's third single "Ball and Chain" and released on 25 March 2022. The album peaked at number 6 on the ARIA Charts; becoming his seventh top ten album in Australia.

== Reception ==
Professional ratings
Review scores
Source	Rating
Rolling Stone Australia	4.5/5 stars

Double J said "There are a few new sounds and moods going on, but hasn't changed is the ultimate intent and result; this is another Xavier Rudd record made with great heart."

Tyler Jenke from Rolling Stone Australia said "Weaving together organic sounds of nature and wildlife, themes of environmentalism and Indigenous history—and powerful compositions that sees him working with the likes of J-Milla or the Slabb Brothers, Jan Juc Moon is one of Xavier Rudd's most resonant albums to date."

Liv Toerkell from Off Key said "Jan Juc Moon features some of the most prolific work of the artist so far... Drawing from the connectedness to nature, the album is inspired by the long conversation that Xavier continues to have with the grounds of his home country. Not always an easy or positive one, the singer is aware of the injustice and discrimination that the colonial past brought upon the country."

== Track listing ==
1. "I Am Eagle" - 4:53
2. "Jan Juc Moon" - 4:46
3. "Stoney Creek" - 4:37
4. "Great Divine" - 5:45
5. "Ball and Chain" (featuring J-Milla) - 4:54
6. "We Deserve to Dream" - 5:17
7. "The Window" - 5:44
8. "Slidin' Down a Rainbow" - 4:28
9. "Dawn to Dusk" - 10:39
10. "Magic" - 4:28
11. "Angel At War" - 3:10
12. "The Calling" - 6:31
13. "Joanna" - 4:30

== Charts ==
Weekly chart performance for Jan Juc Moon
Chart (2022)	Peak position
Australian Albums (ARIA)	6
Belgian Albums (Ultratop Flanders)	46
Belgian Albums (Ultratop Wallonia)	60
German Albums (Offizielle Top 100)	93
Swiss Albums (Schweizer Hitparade)	69
