= Storm Boy (album) =

Studio album by Xavier Rudd
- Released: 25 May 2018
- Studio: Mangrove Jack Studios, New Brighton
- Length: 56:46
- Label: Salt. X Records, Warner

Xavier Rudd chronology
Live in the Netherlands (2017)	Storm Boy (2018)	Jan Juc Moon (2022)

Singles from Storm Boy
- 1. "Walk Away" Released: 23 February 2018; 2. "Times Like These" Released: 4 May 2018; 3. "Honeymoon Bay" Released: June 2019; 4. "Storm Boy" Released: 2019

Storm Boy is the ninth studio album by Australian multi-instrumentalist Xavier Rudd. It was released on 25 May 2018 and peaked at number 6 on the ARIA Charts; becoming his sixth straight top ten in Australia.

The title track was inspired by the 1976 film of the same name; about a young boy's adventures in an isolated region of Australia, including his friendship with an Aboriginal man and the learning of some of life’'s unavoidable lessons.

Before its release, Rudd said "This album is very special to me, it's much more personal than Nanna with the United Nations, which can be considered a separate chapter in my discography. On the other hand, Stom Boy is a natural progression from Spirit Bird, the continuation of my journey and an honest tale of my experiences in the last five years."

== Reception ==
Professional ratings
Review scores
Source	Rating
The Music	3.5/5 stars

Carley Hall from The Music spoke about it being the a follow up to 2012's Spirit Bird saying "Storm Boy retains the passion the troubadour is known for, although this time some less provocative tracks lack punch." Hall added "Rudd sure does have a lot to share. Always with a distinctly Australian way of crafting his words, he makes mention throughout Storm Boy of the ills troubling the world like greedy companies ('Best That I Can'), terrorism and threats to the environment ('Keep It Simple'), the issues that continue to plague the lives of our First People ('Gather the Hands') - all with his trademark slide guitar and reedy vocals. But for all the wrongs Rudd finds in our country, he also celebrates - with tinny guitar plucks and lush instrumentation - all the things that are right with it, like kookaburras singing ('Storm Boy') and a sundered love ('Before I Go')."

Elisabeth Woronzoff from Pop Matters said "Storm Boy explores the linkages between humans and the earth while endowing the listener with an impression of optimism. Like his previous endeavours, Storm Boy captures the need to maintain an environmental and human kinship."

Pablo Gorondi from Associated Press said "Musically, Rudd fits effortlessly into the contemporary singer-songwriter vernacular — some acoustic sounds, some strings, some reggae beats, plenty of soaring choruses and a didgeridoo and ample earnestness." Gorondi also said "The journey on Storm Boy has plenty of captivating tunes and if sometimes it feels a tad long as the 13 songs stream by, Rudd’s personality and musicianship make for amiable travelling companions.

== Track listing ==
All tracks written by Xavier Rudd

1. "Walk Away" - 3:55
2. "Keep It Simple" - 4:58
3. "Storm Boy" - 3:59
4. "Honeymoon Bay" - 3:44
5. "Fly Me High" - 3:47
6. "Gather the Hands" - 5:06
7. "Best That I Can" - 4:39
8. "Feet on the Ground" - 3:18
9. "Growth Lines" - 4:10
10. "True to Yourself" - 3:02
11. "Before I Go" - 2:52
12. "True Love" - 7:38
13. "Times Like These" - 3:38
14. "Untitled" - 2:00

== Charts ==
Weekly chart performance for Storm Boy
Chart (2018)	Peak position
Australian Albums (ARIA)	6
Austrian Albums (Ö3 Austria)	54
Belgian Albums (Ultratop Flanders)	35
Belgian Albums (Ultratop Wallonia)	127
Dutch Albums (Album Top 100)	92
Swiss Albums (Schweizer Hitparade)	31
UK Independent Album Breakers (OCC)	18
