= To Let =

Studio album by Xavier Rudd
- Released: 2002 (Australia)
- Genre: Blues'nRoots; Alternative

Xavier Rudd chronology
Live in Canada (2001)	To Let (2002)	Live at the Grid (2003)

To Let is the debut studio album from Australian roots musician Xavier Rudd. It was released in 2002 and peaked at No. 7 on the ARIA Hitseekers Albums Chart in March 2004.

== Track listing ==
No.	Title	Length
1.	"Introduction"	2:48
2.	"Conceal Me"	3:54
3.	"The 12th of September"	4:17
4.	"Where Do We Fit"	3:58
5.	"To Let"	8:54
6.	"Light the Shade"	2:20
7.	"Little Chief"	6:03
8.	"One Short Story"	4:18
9.	"Timber and Wood"	5:05
10.	"9 Times a Day"	4:10
11.	"Things Meant to Be"	4:59
12.	"Central Avenue"	3:32
13.	"The Wind Cries Mary"	3:50
