= Live in the Netherlands (David S. Ware album) =

Live album by David S. Ware
- Released: 2001
- Recorded: October 26, 1997
- Venue: Effenaar, Eindhoven
- Genre: Jazz
- Length: 39:07
- Label: Splasc(H)

David S. Ware chronology
Corridors & Parallels (2001)	Live in the Netherlands (2001)	Freedom Suite (2002)

Live in the Netherlands is a solo album by American jazz saxophonist David S. Ware, which was recorded in 1997 at Zuid-Nederlands Jazz Festival in Eindhoven and released on the Italian Splasc(H) label.

== Reception ==
Professional ratings
Review scores
Source	Rating
AllMusic	3/5 stars
The Penguin Guide to Jazz	2.5/4 stars

In his review for AllMusic, Steve Loewy states "While this recording will satisfy many of Ware's fans, in some ways it is ultimately a flawed document, and one not likely to stand the test of time as readily as much of his other work."

The Penguin Guide to Jazz notes "The first drawback is that the performance have a curious quality of inwardness and abstraction, almost as if we were listening to David in rehearsal rather than communicating to a live audience."

== Track listing ==
All compositions by David S. Ware

1. "4th Dimensional" – 9:24
2. "5th Dimensional" – 4:33
3. "6th Dimensional" – 10:11
4. "7th Dimensional" – 14:59

== Personnel ==
- David S. Ware – tenor sax
