= Solace (Xavier Rudd album) =

Studio album by Xavier Rudd
- Released: 28 March 2004 (Australia)
- Genres: Blues'nRoots; Alternative
- Label: Salt X/Universal Music Australia
- Producers: Xavier Rudd, Todd Simko

Xavier Rudd chronology
Live at the Grid (2003)	Solace (2004)	Good Spirit (2005)

Singles from Solace
- 1. "Let Me Be" Released: 2003; 2. "Solace" Released: March 2004; 3. "Shelter" Released: July 2004

Professional ratings
Review scores
Source	Rating
Allmusic	3/5 stars

Solace is the second album from Australian roots musician Xavier Rudd, released in Australia on 28 March 2004 and which debuted in the top twenty of the ARIA album chart on 5 April 2004. It is his first record distributed by a major label with distribution by Universal Music Australia. Solace's success earned Rudd two ARIA Music Awards nominations for Best Breakthrough Artist (album) and Best Blues and Roots Album at the 2005 ceremony, but lost to Jet's Get Born and John Butler Trio's Sunrise Over Sea, respectively.

== Songs ==
The eleventh track on the album, "No Woman No Cry", is a cover of Bob Marley's 1974 song of the same name.

"Let Me Be" was ranked number 54 on the Triple J Hottest 100, 2003, while "Shelter" reached number 56 and "Solace" 59 on the Triple J Hottest 100, 2004.

== Track listing ==
No.	Title	Length
1.	"Shelter"	3:49
2.	"3 Degrees"	0:53
3.	"Let Me Be"	4:13
4.	"Solace"	5:01
5.	"G.B.A."	4:35
6.	"In Transit"	1:31
7.	"Chances"	3:42
8.	"Journey Song"	2:41
9.	"A Fourth World"	3:53
10.	"Yirra - Kurl"	1:30
11.	"No Woman No Cry"	4:24
12.	"Partnership"	5:15
13.	"Silence"	4:08
14.	"Green Spandex"	3:56

== Personnel ==
=== Music ===
- Xavier Rudd – guitar, harmonica, drums, vocals, didjeridu, bells, slide guitar, djembe, shaker, slide banjo, Aztec drum, guitar (12 string electric), stomp box, guitar (12 string acoustic)
- Todd Simko – banjo, shaker, Omnichord

=== Production ===
- Producer: Xavier Rudd
- Assistant producer: Todd Simko
- Engineers: Xavier Rudd, Todd Simko
- Mixing: Todd Simko
- Mastering: Gavin Lurssen

== Charts ==
Chart (2004–2005)	Peak position
Australian Albums (ARIA)	13

== Certifications ==
Region	Certification	Certified units/sales
Australia (ARIA)	Platinum	70,000^{^}
^{^} Shipments figures based on certification alone.
