= Stoney Creek (song) =

Single by Xavier Rudd

from the album Jan Juc Moon
- Released: 18 June 2021
- Genre: Alternative music
- Length: 4:37
- Label: Salt.X
- Songwriter: Xavier Rudd
- Producers: Xavier Rudd, Jordan Power, Leon Zervos

Xavier Rudd singles chronology
"Shame" (2020)	"Stoney Creek" (2021)	"We Deserve to Dream" (2021)

Music video
- "Stoney Creek" on YouTube

"Stoney Creek" is a song by Australian multi-instrumentalist Xavier Rudd. It was released on 18 June 2021 as the lead single from his tenth studio album, Jan Juc Moon (2022).

Rudd said, "It was under the melaleuca trees that I wrote 'Stoney Creek' as I contemplated life and what was happening in the world. I had been hearing stories about how the forced lockdowns across the world had allowed space for many of the environment's natural ecosystems to spring back to life and recover from relentless human traffic. I had been thinking 'Without nature, without our natural resources, how do we survive?'"

At the APRA Music Awards of 2022, the song was nominated for Most Performed Blues & Roots Work.

It won the Environmental Music Prize in 2023, with Rudd saying "What an honour to be named winner of the Environmental Music Prize. The land and sea and all its magnificent plants and animals have been the biggest inspiration for my music by far since I began writing songs when I was a kid and, so as far as music awards go, this one feels perfect." Rudd donated the $20,000 prize money to environmental organisations.

The song was certified gold in Australia in March 2026.

== Music video ==
The music video, directed and produced by Axel Massin, premiered on 17 June 2021 and shows Valeriya Gogunskaya skateboarding along the Portuguese coastline, moving through beaches, forests and clifftops.

== Track listing ==
digital single

1. "Stoney Creek" - 4:37

digital single

1. "Stoney Creek"- 4:37
2. "Stoney Creek" (a cappella) - 3:44

== Charts ==
Weekly chart performance for "Stoney Creek"
Chart (2021)	Peak position
Australian Independent Singles (AIR)	13

== Certifications ==
Region	Certification	Certified units/sales
Australia (ARIA)	Gold	35,000^{‡}
^{‡} Sales+streaming figures based on certification alone.
