= Follow the Sun (Xavier Rudd song) =

Single by Xavier Rudd

from the album Spirit Bird
- Released: February 2012
- Studio: Studios 301
- Length: 4:15
- Label: Salt.X
- Songwriter: Xavier Rudd
- Producer: Xavier Rudd

Music video
- "Follow the Sun" on YouTube

"Follow the Sun" is a song by Australian multi-instrumentalist Xavier Rudd. It was released in February 2012 as the lead single from his seventh studio album, Spirit Bird. The music video was filmed on location at Stradbroke Island (Minjerribah).

The song was the last recorded for the album and only track recorded in Australia (with the rest of the album recorded in Canada). The song features calls of thirty species of Australian birds. Rudd said "I guess reflecting on the massive amount of stuff that's happening, that has been happening on this ancient land for many years, a long time before our culture, and just how we don't take any time to acknowledge that. And it just came from that whole understanding when I got home. I wanted it to have that feeling of gentle flowing water."

In a live review in 2012, Brendan Hitchens from The Music said "'Follow the Sun' the most simplistic of Rudd's songs instrumentally, utilises acoustic guitar and harmonica. There's a fragility to Rudd's voice and his use of stomp box adds a continuous heartbeat to the rawness. He sings with a perpetual smile and draws energy from the connection between audience and music."

At the APRA Music Awards of 2013, the song was shortlisted for Song of the Year.

In August 2014, a remix credited to Time Square featuring Xavier Rudd was released, entering the German and Italian top 100.

The original song entered the dutch singles chart in December 2015, peaking at number 24 in February 2016.

== Track listing ==
digital single + CD single (2012)

1. "Follow the Sun" (radio edit) - 3:51
2. "Follow the Sun" (album version) - 4:15

digital single (Time Square featuring Xavier Rudd) (2014)

1. "Follow the Sun" (Black Box Radio Edit). 3:23
2. "Follow the Sun" (Western Disco Superdub) - 7:37
3. "Follow the Sun" (Xoxo A.k.a. Daniele Petronelli & Worp mix) - 7:12

digital single + CD single (Time Square featuring Xavier Rudd) (2016

1. "Follow the Sun" (Western Disco radio edit) - 3:42
2. "Follow the Sun" (Western Disco remix) - 5:16
3. "Follow the Sun" (Blackbox radio edit) - 3:23
4. "Follow the Sun" (Blackbox acoustic mix) - 4:16
5. "Follow the Sun" (Western Disco Superdub) - 7:37
6. "Follow the Sun" (Xoxo A.k.a. Daniele Petronelli & Worp radio edit) - 3:37
7. "Follow the Sun" (Xoxo A.k.a. Daniele Petronelli & Worp mix) - 7:12

== Charts ==
Weekly chart performance for "Follow the Sun"
Chart (2015-2016)	Peak position
Netherlands (Single Top 100)	24
Chart (2022)	Peak position
UK Singles (OCC)	56

Weekly chart performance for "Follow the Sun" (Time Square featuring Xavier Rudd)
Chart (2014-2016)	Peak position
Italy (FIMI)	20
Germany (GfK)	77
Netherlands (Single Top 100)	100

Annual chart rankings for "Follow the Sun" (Time Square featuring Xavier Rudd)
Chart (2014)	Rank
Italy (Musica e dischi)	61

== Certifications ==
Region	Certification	Certified units/sales
Australia (ARIA)	5× Platinum	350,000^{‡}
New Zealand (RMNZ)	Platinum	30,000^{‡}
^{‡} Sales+streaming figures based on certification alone.
