= Nanna (album) =

Studio album by Xavier Rudd and the United Nations
- Released: 17 March 2015
- Genre: Reggae
- Length: 54:03
- Label: Salt. X
- Producer: Xavier Rudd

Xavier Rudd chronology
Spirit Bird (2012)	Nanna (2015)	Live in the Netherlands (2017)

Nanna is the eighth studio album recorded by Xavier Rudd featuring the United Nations, a band featuring a diverse group of musicians from Australia, South Africa, Samoa, Germany, Ireland and Papua New Guinea. The album was recorded and self-produced in Australia and mixed by Errol Brown in Jamaica.

== Reception ==
Professional ratings
Review scores
Source	Rating
AllMusic	4.5/5 stars
Rolling Stone Australia	3/5 stars

In his review for AllMusic, Thom Jurek calls Rudd's work on Nanna "far more collaborative than anything he's done before." On the first single, "Come People", "Rudd's vocals are urgent, layered just above backing vocalists Georgia Carowa and Alicia Mellor, whose chants underscore his lines", but it's the United Nations collective who are the voice of the album. Jurek believes "Rudd reveals himself as a gifted bandleader and arranger" allowing the United Nations to shine "in this ambitious mix."

Dan Lander of Rolling Stone Australia wrote, "Nanna is a beautiful celebration of global sound, the only flaw being that Rudd's own unique voice gets a little lost in all that egalitarianism."

== Track listing ==
All tracks are written by Xavier Rudd.

No.	Title	Length
1.	"Flag"	3:41
2.	"While I'm Gone"	3:28
3.	"Hannalei"	3:56
4.	"Come People"	2:43
5.	"Sacred"	2:56
6.	"Nanna"	5:38
7.	"Rusty Hammer"	3:11
8.	"Rainbow Serpent"	4:03
9.	"Creancient"	6:21
10.	"Warrior"	5:03
11.	"Struggle"	3:52
12.	"Radiate"	0:54
13.	"Bundagen"	8:11

== Personnel ==
- Bobby Alu – Drums, percussion
- Georgia Carowa – Backing vocals
- Stuart Currie – Trombone
- Eddie Elias – Fender Rhodes, Hammond organ, piano
- Peter Hunt – Trumpet
- Simon Keet – Synthesizer
- Chris Lane – Bansuri, tenor sax
- Alicia Mellor – Backing vocals
- Tio Moloantoa – Bass
- Yeshe Reiners – Ngoni, percussion
- Xavier Rudd – Guitar, vocals, Weissenborn, Yidaki

== Charts ==
Chart (2015)	Peak position
Australian Albums (ARIA)	8
