= Dark Shades of Blue =

Studio album by Xavier Rudd
- Released: 16 August 2008
- Label: Salt. X, Anti
- Producer: Xavier Rudd, Joe Barresi

Xavier Rudd chronology
White Moth (2007)	Dark Shades of Blue (2008)	Koonyum Sun (2010)

Professional ratings
Review scores
Source	Rating
AllMusic	4/5 stars
Crawdaddy!	(favourable)
Honest Tune	{favourable}

Dark Shades of Blue is the fifth studio album by Australian multi-instrumentalist Xavier Rudd, which was released on 16 August 2008. It peaked at No. 5 on the ARIA Albums Chart.

== Track listing ==
All tracks are written by Xavier Rudd.

No.	Title	Length
1.	"Blackwater"	3:31
2.	"Dark Shades of Blue"	4:03
3.	"Secrets"	6:43
4.	"Guku"	4:12
5.	"Edge of the Moon"	5:08
6.	"This World As We Know It"	4:03
7.	"Shiver"	7:27
8.	"Uncle"	7:49
9.	"Up in Flames"	3:37
10.	"Hope That You'll Stay"	4:09
11.	"Home"	5:52

== Personnel ==
- Joe Barresi – mixing
- Carmel Echols – choir, chorus
- Rob Giles – choir, chorus
- Jimmy Hoyson – engineer, vocal engineer
- Clydene Jackson – choir, chorus
- James Looker – engineer, production assistant, photography, instrument technician
- Gavin Lurssen – mastering
- Anthony Lycenko – assistant engineer
- Banula Marika – vocals, vocals (background)
- Xavier Rudd – organ, guitar (acoustic), bass, guitar (electric), vocals, producer, slide guitar, stomp box, guitar (12-string acoustic)
- Paul "Scooby" Smith – assistant engineer
- Oren Waters – choir, chorus
- Wil Wheaton – choir, chorus
- Maxine Willard – Waters choir, chorus

== Charts ==
Chart performance for Dark Shades of Blue
Chart (2008)	Peak position
Australian Albums (ARIA)	5
Belgian Albums (Ultratop Wallonia)	94
