= We Deserve to Dream =

Single by Xavier Rudd

from the album Jan Juc Moon
- Released: 24 September 2021
- Length: 5:17
- Label: Salt.X
- Songwriter: Xavier Rudd
- Producers: Xavier Rudd, Jordan Power, Leon Zervos

Xavier Rudd singles chronology
"Stoney Creek" (2021)	"We Deserve to Dream" (2021)	"Ball and Chain" (2022)

Music video
- "We Deserve to Dream" on YouTube

"We Deserve to Dream" is a song by Australian multi-instrumentalist Xavier Rudd. It was released in September 2021 as the second single from his tenth studio album, Jan Juc Moon (2022). The music video features renown First Nations dancer Tyrel Dulvarie.

At the APRA Music Awards of 2023, the song won Most Performed Blues & Roots Work.

In November 2022, electronic duo GoldFish released a version via Armada Music featuring Rudd's vocals.

The song was certified gold in Australia in March 2026.

== Reception ==
Dan Condon from Double J said "Rudd delivers a hushed, almost atmospheric guitar performance and a gentle beat, ensuring his distinct and natural vocal is prominent. That vocal is a tribute to the natural world: the elements that run down mountains, flow through trees, and swim in the ocean. Meanwhile, all we can do is just try and be the best we can."

Indigeous Community TV said "'We Deserve to Dream' speaks of the freedom that is ours to be found in the elements of the land, the ocean, the trees, yet we find ourselves locked up in layers of conditioning thrust upon us by life" and said the song "features steel guitar, Xavier's signature percussive beat drives this spirited song that builds to a sweet soaring chorus with an anthemic bent."

== Track listings ==
digital single (2021)

1. "We Deserve to Dream" - 5:17

digital single (Goldfish featuring Xavier Rudd) (2022)

1. "We Deserve to Dream" - 3:32
2. "We Deserve to Dream" (extended) - 5:11

== Certifications ==
Region	Certification	Certified units/sales
Australia (ARIA)	Gold	35,000^{‡}
^{‡} Sales+streaming figures based on certification alone.
