= Spirit Bird =

Studio album by Xavier Rudd
- Released: 8 June 2012
- Recorded: Ontario, Canada (except "Follow the Sun" recorded at Studios 301 in Byron Bay)
- Length: 63:49
- Labels: Salt. X, Universal
- Producer: Xavier Rudd

Xavier Rudd chronology
| Koonyum Sun (2010) | Spirit Bird (2012) | Nanna (2015) |

Spirit Bird is the seventh studio album by Australian multi-instrumentalist Xavier Rudd. It was released on 8 June 2012. Spirit Bird sold 5733 in its first week in Australia.

== Recording ==
Rudd recorded most of the album in Ontario, Canada at a studio in a wooden cottage by a lake. "Follow the Sun", which features the sound of magpies at the start, was the last track recorded for the album, and the only song recorded outside of Canada, at Studios 301 in Byron Bay.

== Reception ==
The album debuted at number 36 on the Canadian Albums Chart and at number 2 on the ARIA album chart. In the album's first week of release it was the biggest selling album in Western Australia, Queensland and Victoria.

== Track listing ==
All tracks are written by Xavier Rudd.

| No. | Title | Length |
|---|---|---|
| 1. | "Lioness Eye" | 6:37 |
| 2. | "Comfortable in My Skin" | 3:14 |
| 3. | "Spirit Bird" | 7:11 |
| 4. | "Prosper" | 2:11 |
| 5. | "Bow Down" | 3:34 |
| 6. | "Follow the Sun" | 4:16 |
| 7. | "Butterfly" | 2:11 |
| 8. | "Culture Bleeding" | 4:40 |
| 9. | "Paper Thin" | 3:52 |
| 10. | "Full Circle" | 10:18 |
| 11. | "Mystery Angel" | 4:38 |
| 12. | "3 Roads" | 6:04 |
| 13. | "Creating a Dream" | 5:01 |

== Personnel ==
=== Production ===
- Xavier Rudd – producer
- Luke Davis – instrument technician and production assistant
- Jordan Power – engineer
- Scott Horscroft – audio mixer
- Steve Smart – mastering
- Mike Gillies - engineer

=== Design ===
- Dersu Rhodes – art direction and design

== Charts ==
| Chart (2012–17) | Peak position |
|---|---|
| Australian Albums (ARIA) | 2 |
| Belgian Albums (Ultratop Flanders) | 119 |
| Dutch Albums (Album Top 100) | 38 |
| Swiss Albums (Schweizer Hitparade) | 85 |

== Certifications ==
Certifications for Spirit Bird
| Region | Certification | Certified units/sales |
|---|---|---|
| New Zealand (RMNZ) | Gold | 7,500^{‡} |
^{‡} Sales+streaming figures based on certification alone.
