= Bobby Alu =

Samoan-Australian musician

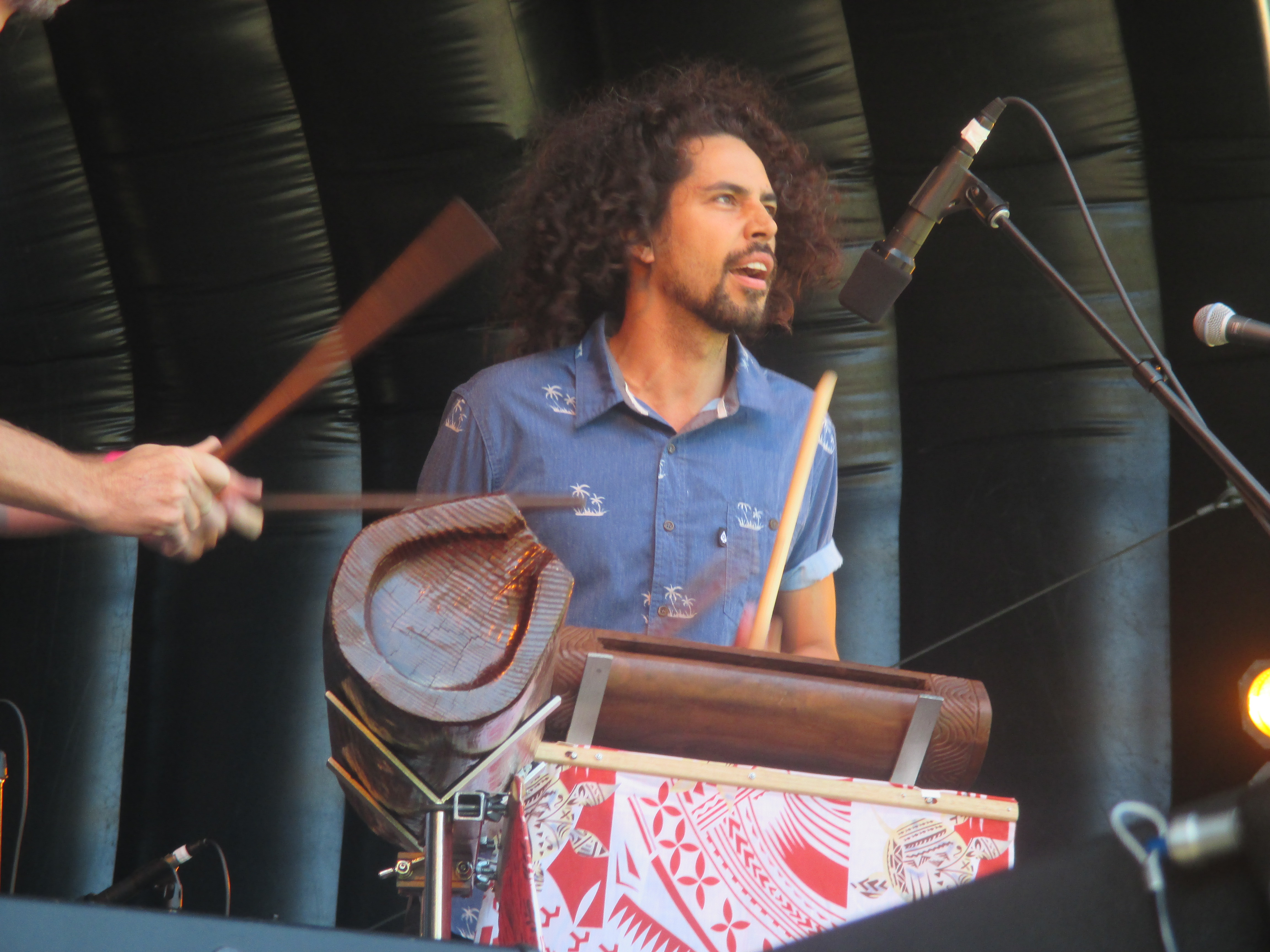
- Bobby Alu performing in 2016

Background information
- Born: Charles Robert Fa'agalu Wall
- Genres: Tropical folk, reggae, roots
- Years active: 2010–present
- Website: bobbyalu.com

Bobby Alu (born Charles Robert Fa'Agalu Wall) is a Samoan-Australian musician, singer-songwriter, drummer and ukulele player. His music blends elements of tropical folk, roots, reggae and Polynesian rhythm, drawing on his Samoan heritage and life by the sea. Alu has released multiple studio albums since 2010 and toured internationally, both as a solo artist and as a percussionist supporting other acts.

== Early life and education ==
Alu was born Charles Robert Fa'Agalu Wall on December 1984. Alu's mother is from Falealili, Samoa, and his father is from Australia. He was born on the Gold Coast and studied at Griffith University. He began learning the ukulele at age six, and later developed his musical skills through performance, particularly as a drummer.

== Career ==
Bobby Alu's professional career began with roles as a percussionist and drummer, including touring internationally with Australian artist Xavier Rudd. During this period he honed his performance skills and gained exposure to audiences around the world.

In 2010, Alu released his self-titled debut studio album, followed by Take It Slow in 2013, which was produced by Paulie Bromley. His third album, Flow (2019), received critical attention from The Australian for its upbeat, uplifting sound and was included in Australian radio station's Double J list of the 50 best albums of 2019.

Alu was nominated for Best International Pacific Artist at the 2019 Pacific Music Awards, and Flow was nominated for an Australian Independent Record Award in 2020.

During the COVID-19 lockdowns in 2020, Alu regularly sang with his mother, Foloi. Together, they recorded an EP of folk songs sung in Samoan, which was released as Samoa Silasila in 2022.

In May 2024, Alu released his fourth album, Keep It Tropical, which was described by Songlines magazine as "nothing too demanding, just a finger-tapping sway in a sun-drenched musical hammock." The album reached #3 on the ARIA Australian Albums Chart and reached #1 on the AIR Independent Label Albums chart.

Alu has supported and performed alongside a range of artists on tour, including John Butler Trio and Trevor Hall, and has taken his own music to international audiences across Europe, North America and Australia. His live performances are known for their positive, feel-good energy and connection with audiences. In 2025, to celebrate the 10th anniversary of his track "My Style", he announced an evening tour of intimate full-band shows.

== Artistry and influences ==
Alu's music is often categorized as tropical folk but is heavily influenced by reggae, citing Bob Marley, Peter Tosh, and Burning Spear as key inspirations. He describes his songwriting as seeking a balance between being "spiritual yet playful, and tight but loose." His Samoan heritage plays a significant role in his artistry; he has noted that in Samoan culture, "everyone can sing," which shaped his organic approach to music-making.

His songwriting process has evolved from a spontaneous flow to a more disciplined craft, before returning to a method that embraces spontaneity and reduces self-criticism. He has spoken about designing rituals to access creativity, later learning to write without restrictive conditions.

== Discography ==
=== Albums ===
- Bobby Alu (2010)
- Take It Slow (2013)
- Flow (2019)
- Keep It Tropical (2024)

=== Extended plays ===
- Samoa Silasila (with Foloi Wall) (2022)
- Bay Sessions (2015)

=== Singles ===
- Keep It Tropical (2024)
- Ready For Your Love (2024)
