= White Moth =

Studio album by Xavier Rudd
- Released: 2 June 2007
- Genre: Blues and roots; alternative
- Label: Salt. X, Anti
- Producer: Xavier Rudd, Dave Ogilvie

Xavier Rudd chronology
Food in the Belly (2005)	White Moth (2007)	Dark Shades of Blue (2008)

Professional ratings
Review scores
Source	Rating
AllMusic	3.5/5 stars
Rolling Stone	3/5 stars

White Moth is the fourth studio album by Australian multi-instrumentalist Xavier Rudd. "Better People" was released as the first single taken from the album. White Moth is Rudd's first album with the ANTI- record company. The album peaked at #30 on the Billboard Heatseekers album chart in June.

White Moth's success earned an ARIA Music Awards nomination for Best Blues and Roots Album at the 2007 ceremony, but lost to John Butler Trio's multi-platinum Grand National.

== Content ==
The official Xavier Rudd online store had this to say about the album:

"White Moth" charts the spiritual journey of multi-instrumentalist Rudd. He’s traveled the globe and built a devoted following of fans, drawn to his amalgamation of folk, reggae, rock and world music. Featuring guest vocals from aboriginal Singers, "White Moth" pays respect to Australia’s indigenous people, from whom the yidaki (didgeridoo) virtuoso has drawn bottomless inspiration.

== Track listing ==
No.	Title	Length
1.	"Better People"	3:06
2.	"Twist"	3:01
3.	"Stargaze"	3:36
4.	"Choices"	4:22
5.	"Come Let Go"	6:52
6.	"White Moth"	2:08
7.	"Footprint"	7:04
8.	"Land Rights"	3:13
9.	"Anni Kookoo"	3:18
10.	"Message Stick"	5:11
11.	"Set It Up"	4:08
12.	"Whispers"	4:43
13.	"Whirlpool"	4:28
14.	"Come Back"	4:09

== Charts ==
Chart (2007)	Peak position
Australian Albums (ARIA)	6

== Certifications ==
Region	Certification	Certified units/sales
Australia (ARIA)	Gold	35,000^{^}
^{^} Shipments figures based on certification alone.
