= Let Me Be (Xavier Rudd song) =

- European CD single cover (2006)

Single by Xavier Rudd

from the album Solace
- Released: 2003
- Label: Salt.X, Anti- (2006)
- Songwriter: Xavier Rudd
- Producers: Xavier Rudd, Todd Simko

Xavier Rudd singles chronology
"Let Me Be" (2003)	"Solace" (2004)

Music video
- "WLet Me Be" on YouTube

"Let Me Be" is a song by Australian multi-instrumentalist Xavier Rudd. It was released in 2003 as the lead single from his second studio album, Solace (2024).

It was voted 54 in the Triple J Hottest 100, 2003.

It was released in Europe in 2006 via Anti- (record label).

In 2023, Rudd reflected saying "My whole thing was pretty quirky, didges with guitars and stuff, no one was doing that, and I didn't see it as anything really commercial. Then, all of a sudden it got traction and became popular, so I was stoked."

In November 2015, the song featured in a KFC advertisement, angering his fans and PETA as Rudd is long time vegetarian and animal rights activist.

In 2025, the single was certified platinum in Australia.

== Track listing ==
UK Single (Anti- 1255-2) (2006)

1. "Let Me Be" (radio edit) - 3:09
2. "To Let" - 8:53
3. "Let Me Be" (video) (Live in Sydney)

== Certifications ==
Certification for "Let Me Be"
Region	Certification	Certified units/sales
Australia (ARIA)	Platinum	70,000^{‡}
^{‡} Sales+streaming figures based on certification alone.
