= Xavier Rudd =

Australian singer, songwriter, and musician

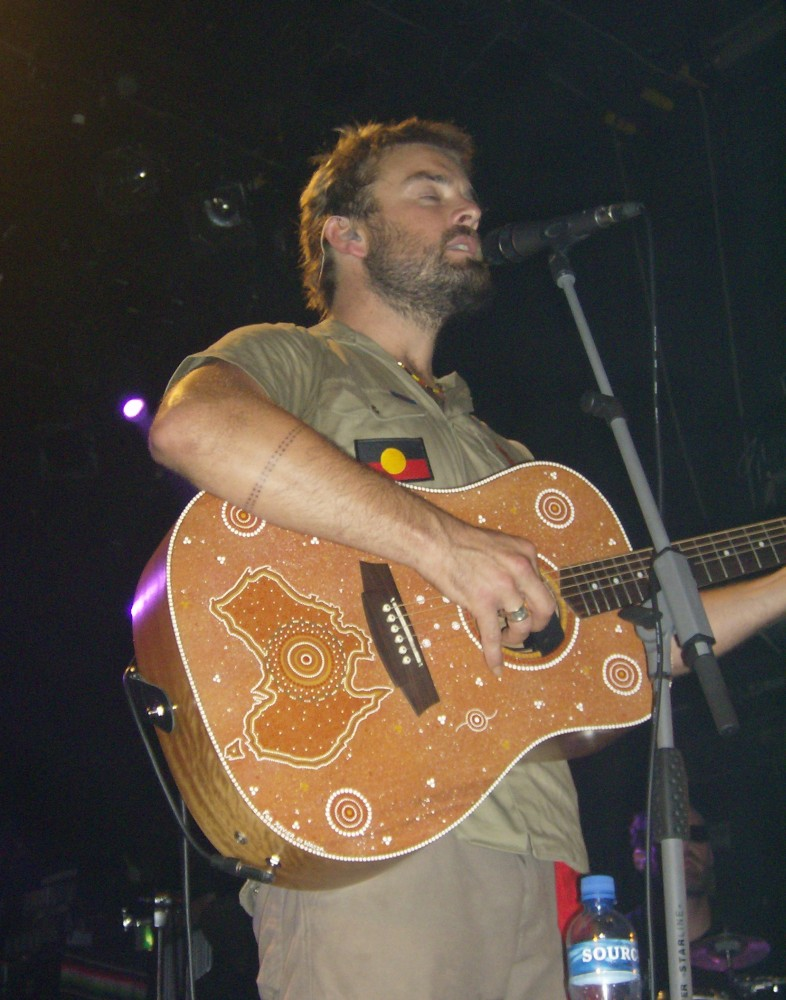
- Rudd performing in 2008

Background information
- Born: 29 May 1978 (age 48)
- Origin: Torquay, Victoria, Australia
- Genres: Folk; blues; indie folk; folk rock; reggae
- Occupations: Singer; songwriter; musician; multi-instrumentalist
- Instruments: Vocals; guitar; harmonica; didgeridoo; lap steel guitar; percussion
- Years active: 1998–present
- Labels: SaltX; Universal Music Australia

Xavier Rudd (born 29 May 1978) is an Australian singer, songwriter, musician, and multi-instrumentalist. Several of Rudd's songs incorporate socially conscious themes, such as spirituality, humanity, environmentalism and the rights of Indigenous Australians.

== Early life ==
Xavier Rudd grew up in Jan Juc, near Torquay, Victoria. He attended St Joseph's College, Geelong. His maternal grandfather was Dutch, born in Tilburg, a city in the Netherlands, before migrating to Australia. One of his grandmothers was from an Irish potato-growing family and grew up in Colac, Victoria. Rudd claims to be of Aboriginal, Irish and Scottish heritage, furthermore mentioning being of Wurundjeri ancestry, and that one of his great grandmothers was an Aboriginal Australian, and her child (Rudd's paternal grandmother) was taken away from her.

Rudd showed a keen interest in music growing up in a family of seven children. While in primary school, Rudd used his mother's vacuum cleaner as a makeshift didgeridoo and began playing his brother's guitar. He also played saxophone and clarinet as a child.

As a child, Rudd sold recycled wood through his own furniture business. Immediately after finishing school, Rudd travelled to Fiji. He lived in villages around the country for nine months, returning to Australia at age 19.

== Career ==
=== 1998–2002: early career to debut studio album ===
Before launching his solo career, Rudd began playing music as part of the band 'Xavier and the Hum'. He drew inspiration from artists such as Leo Kottke, Ben Harper, Natalie Merchant and multi-instrumentalist David Lindley, as well as music from diverse sources such as Hawaiian and Native American music. His music first took him overseas when he traveled to Whistler, British Columbia—Rudd was in a band and would play each night after a day of snowboarding.

Rudd was in Canada when the September 11 attacks happened. Rudd felt "spun out" watching the American media coverage, including graphic imagery of the destruction of the World Trade Center. Rudd wrote the song 12 September, which would feature on his first studio album To Let, about the day after the attacks. In 2006, discussing the song, Rudd said:

That's what the song's about, the world waiting. All of a sudden there was an attack and there was these people who were equally as toxic that were going to retaliate. No one could really do anything about it. It's about the next day and that's why I called it the 12th of September.

=== 2003–2005: Solace to Food in the Belly ===
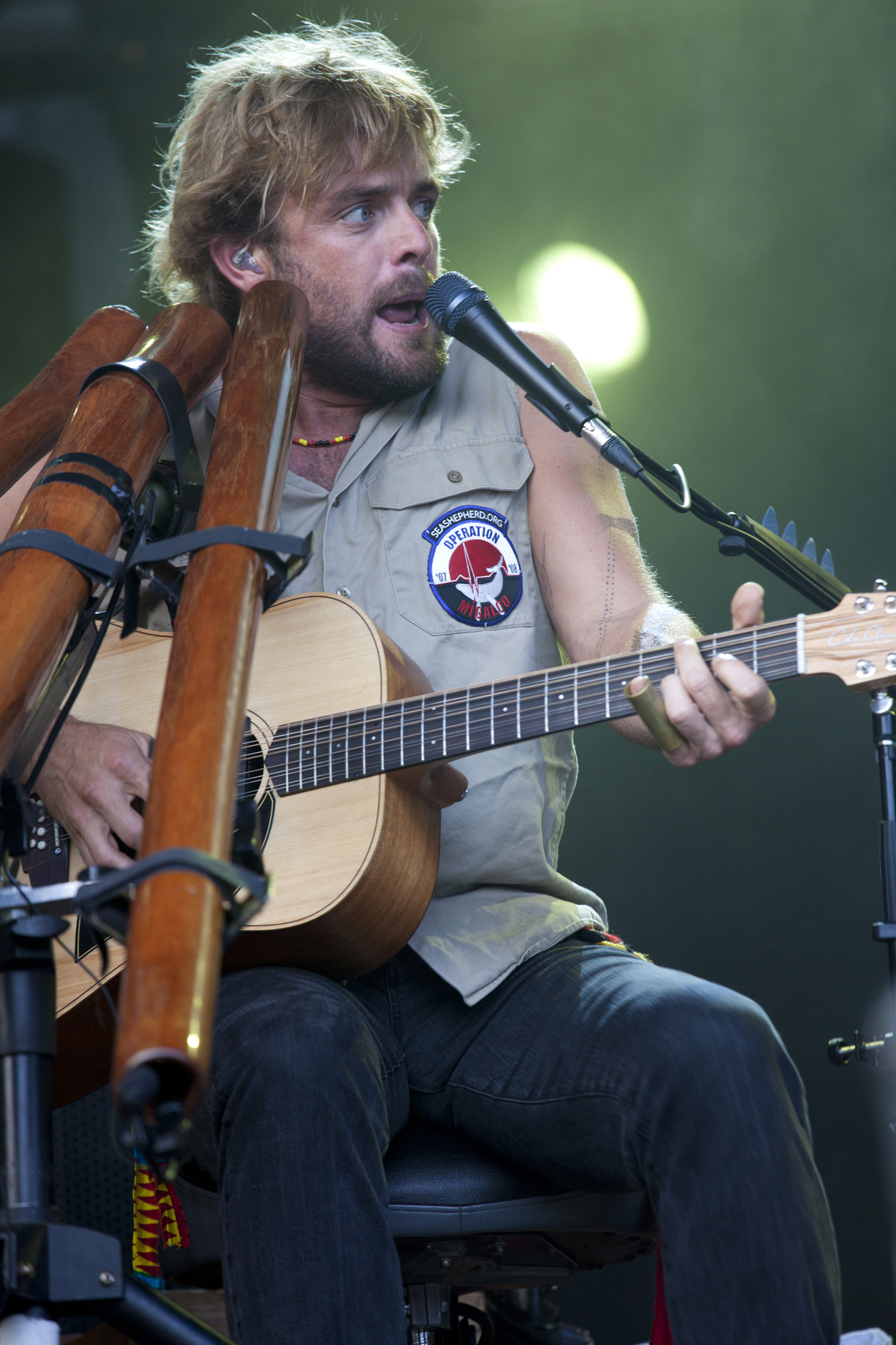
Xavier Rudd (2010)

In 2004, Rudd released Solace, his first album to be distributed by a major label—Universal Music Australia. Rather than inviting guest artists to join him on the record, Rudd performed all the instrumentation for the album alone with only a few overdubs. Instruments included didgeridoos, slide guitars, stomp boxes, djembe drums, slit drums, and the harmonica. In his live show, Rudd came to be renowned for his 'one-man band' performances.

Rudd recorded Food in the Belly in mid-2004 whilst on break from an extensive North American tour. The recording was made in May 2004 at Bowen Island, part of the Greater Vancouver Regional District.

=== 2007: White Moth ===
The song White Moth was written about a moth that followed Rudd's son Joaquin for several hours on his mother's 30th birthday. Rudd thought it was the spirit of his then wife's grandmother. Rudd and his family were holidaying to celebrate the occasion on an island off Sri Lanka.

In 2007, Rudd partnered with Clif Bar's GreenNotes program to create the "Better People Campaign". The campaign was about expressing gratitude to the people in the world taking steps to make positive change.

=== 2008–2011: Dark Shades of Blue to collaboration with Izintaba ===
"Black Water" the first track on Rudd's 2008 album Dark Shades of Blue was named after one of Lutken-Rudd's paintings. The album saw Rudd introduce a heavier sound, using electric guitars in place of acoustic guitars and creating darker more somber tones. He recorded with Dave Tolley, a percussionist drummer, who he had previously collaborated with for White Moth and Food in the Belly.

Reflecting on Dark Shades of Blue, Rudd told media he felt the heavier sound was a "precursor for things that might come... I feel like my music is ahead of me all the time". Rudd was referring to his and Lutken's divorce, which was finalised in 2009.

After the failure of his marriage, Rudd was supported in his grief and recovery by new South African bandmates, bassist Tio Moloantoa and percussionist Andile Nqubezelo. Rudd had met Moloantoa and Nqubezelo performing at the 2008 Wiesen Nuke Festival. Rudd described his connection with Moloantoa and Nqubezelo as musical, spiritual and emotional—"I feel like they were sent to me", he said.

In 2010 Rudd bought 20 hectares of property at Koonyum Range, Mullumbimby, the location was the inspiration for the name of the album Rudd would release with Moloantoa and Nqubezelo, Koonyum Sun. The album moved away from the heavier sound of Dark Shades of Blue to a more up-beat style.

=== 2012: Spirit Bird ===
In 2011, Rudd underwent emergency back surgery, to repair three herniated disks, bone spurs and nerve damage. Rudd wrote the track Comfortable in My Skin, on his 2012 album Spirit Bird, when he was suffering from major nerve pain before his surgery. In its entirety, the album sampled 30 species of Australian birds.

The song Spirit Bird came about after an encounter Rudd had with a red-tailed black cockatoo in the Kimberley. The encounter coincided with Rudd experiencing a powerful rush of imagery and emotion.

A lot of that [album] grew out of me giving myself to that country up in the Kimberley and that country gave it back to me... I'd been on a bit of a journey and Spirit Bird represents that.

=== 2015: Rudd joins with the United Nations ===
Nanna, the 2015 album Rudd released in collaboration with the United Nations, champions cultural understanding and condemns racism and intolerance. To record the album, Rudd and the United Nations worked with producer Errol Brown. In an interview published in The Aspen Times, Rudd shared that Nanna had given him a chance to focus on his vocal performance. He said that he had never really liked his voice before and vocals were often little more than an afterthought, but by 2016 was embracing it.

The song "Shame" on Nanna was inspired by conversations about racism surrounding AFL player Adam Goodes, an Aboriginal football player who was repeatedly booed at matches. Rudd had previously declared his support for Goodes addressing the AFL Players' Association 2014 Season Launch. At the time of writing the song "Creancient" for the album, Rudd was working with a Shaman in Peru. He participated in several ceremonies, including one that involved vomiting and experiencing hallucinations and another involving mud bathing. Rudd described the song as something that flowed out of him over a week while he felt like he was outside of himself, looking at his ego from a distance.

In late 2015, Rudd was forced to cut his North American tour for Nanna short to have disc replacement and fusion surgery in his lower back, having experienced chronic pain over several months.

In November 2015, Rudd's 2003 song "Let Me Be" featured in an Australian TV commercial promoting KFC, a large fast food restaurant chain specialising in factory farmed fried chicken. Many fans used social media to complain about the inclusion of the song on the commercial. PETA responded that they hoped that Rudd had not approved the use of his music for the advertising.

=== 2021-2023: Jan Juc Moon ===
In April 2021, it was announced Rudd had signed with newly rebranded Virgin Music Australia. On 17 June 2021, Rudd released ""Stoney Creek"", the lead single from his forthcoming tenth studio album.

In January 2022, Rudd released "Ball and Chain", the third single from his tenth studio album, Jan Juc Moon.

Rudd won the 2023 Environmental Music Prize for "Stoney Creek".

In July 2023, Rudd released the single "Road Trippin'".

=== 2024-present: Freedom Sessions & Where to Now ===
In March 2024, Rudd released the EP Freedom Sessions This was followed by the EP Where to Now in September 2025. The two EPs will be released on vinyl on 6 March 2026.

In June 2026 Rudd released the single Part of Life, featuring the voice of Jane Goodall. The single was accompanied by a music video directed and animated by The Big Lez Show creator Jarrad Wright, and featured an animated version of Rudd as well as characters from the show.

== Personal life ==
Rudd often likes to spend time in the Australian bush in his 4WD Toyota Landcruiser, championing the traditional Aboriginal Australian way of life. His songs include stories of the mistreatment of the Indigenous people of his homeland. Rudd has taken part in several Aboriginal ceremonies. In 2003, he says he was adopted into the Dhuwa mob (one of two moieties of the Yolngu people) in northeast Arnhem Land. He has also spent time with people from several North American indigenous groups—the Cree, Mohawk and Iroquois.

Rudd is a keen surfer, having started when he was five or six years old, and says at times surfing inspires his music. He also enjoys snowboarding, one of the few activities he wears shoes for.

Rudd grew up in a Catholic family. When asked about his religious beliefs, Rudd has said "I'm not religious in the sense that I don't believe in a God and I don't follow the tenets of organised churches, but I believe in nature and everything that surrounds me: I love Earth, the sun, the sea and animals. Music is my only church."

=== Family ===
Rudd was formerly married to Marci Lutken, an artist from Canada. They met when she was backpacking in Fitzroy, Victoria, in 1999. After getting pregnant, the two married, and eventually they had two sons. Rudd obtained Canadian dual citizenship. The marriage ended in 2009.

Rudd is married to Ashley Freeman-Rudd, an Australian former model, and dancer and holistic wellness trainer. They were married in a Byron Bay wedding ceremony and now live in the Shire of Noosa with their two children.

=== Vegetarianism ===
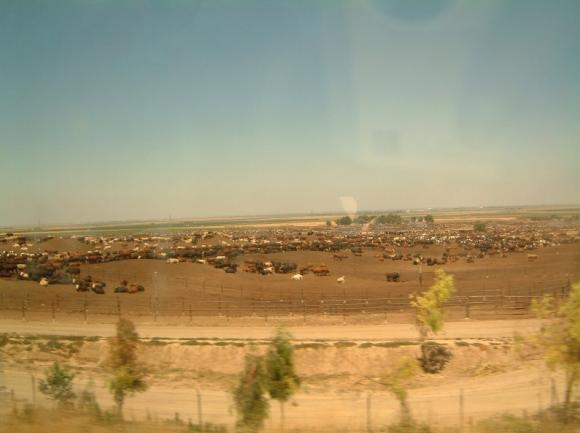
View of Harris Ranch—the beef farm that inspired Rudd to change his diet and become a vegetarian

Rudd became a vegetarian after passing Harris Ranch, California's largest factory farm, during a United States tour. Rudd described in an interview with PETA how the experience made him change his diet, saying:

[The animals] stood crammed together on this piece of land. They could hardly move as the area was too small for all those animals. Plus, they'd already eaten or trampled down the grass and all the feces were just left there. They were standing in their own waste and—what I found worse—even had to eat it because the workers didn't offer them anything else. I asked the driver about it and he said, "Well, that's California's biggest beef producer." I could still smell it after we had driven for another 30 kilometers. That was when I knew it was the right choice to go vegetarian.

Rudd was nominated for PETA's annual "World's Sexiest Vegetarian Celebrity" award in 2007. In 2008, PETA named him sexiest Australian male vegetarian.

=== Activism and causes ===
In February 2009, Rudd performed at a public rally in opposition to residential development in Torquay.

Rudd received the 'Rock the Boat Award' in 2009 for his support of the Sea Shepherd Conservation Society. Rudd is friends with Canadian environmentalist Paul Watson, who founded Sea Shepherd. In January 2010, Rudd was one of the last passengers aboard Sea Shepherd ship Ady Gil, days before it sank after a collision with the MV Shōnan Maru 2 Japanese whaling security vessel.

In 2012, Rudd was outspoken against Colin Barnett's plan to open up the Kimberley to mining operations. He joined the Save the Kimberley movement to save James Price Point.

Working with volunteer organisations Surf for Life and Waves of Hope, Rudd worked alongside other volunteers to build a high school in northern Nicaragua in late 2013.

In 2014, Rudd performed at the Bentley (unrelated to the car company of the same name) anti-gas blockade campsite, in support of the Lock the Gate Alliance. He had previously travelled to the Doubtful Creek coal-seam gas test drilling site in February 2013 to voice his concerns about the gas drilling, saying: "Our government is hopeless, ruthless and toxic in terms of protecting our land." The protestor's actions at the Bentley Blockade, where they blocked the delivery of oil- and gas-drilling equipment for weeks, led the New South Wales Government to suspend Metgasco's drilling licence.

In 2015, Rudd was criticised for selling the rights to his song "Let me Be" to the multi-national company KFC, well known for their factory-farmed chicken, in a television advertisement. The advertising campaign was widely criticised by fans, and the absence of a response or explanation by Rudd served to undermine his integrity relative to his activism.

== Live performances ==
Rudd has become a known name at music festivals worldwide including the Bonnaroo Music Festival, the High Sierra Music Festival (2004 and 2007) and the Wakarusa Music and Camping Festival (2005), moe.down (2003), Summer Sonic, Lowlands, Rock Werchter, and others. He has toured with artists including Jack Johnson, Dave Matthews, Ben Harper, Good Old War, G. Love & Special Sauce, and Rodrigo y Gabriela.

== Discography ==
- To Let (2002)
- Solace (2004)
- Food in the Belly (2005)
- White Moth (2007)
- Dark Shades of Blue (2008)
- Koonyum Sun (with Izintaba) (2010)
- Spirit Bird (2012)
- Nanna (with The United Nations) (2015)
- Storm Boy (2018)
- Jan Juc Moon (2022)

== Awards and nominations ==
=== AIR Awards ===
The Australian Independent Record Awards (commonly known informally as AIR Awards) is an annual awards night to recognise, promote and celebrate the success of Australia's independent music sector.

Year	Nominee / work	Award	Result
2012	Spirit Bird	Best Independent Blues and Roots Album	Nominated

=== APRA Awards ===
The APRA Awards are held in Australia and New Zealand by the Australasian Performing Right Association to recognise songwriting skills, sales and airplay performance by its members annually.

Year	Nominee / work	Award	Result	Ref.
2013	"Follow the Sun"	Song of the Year	Shortlisted	
2019	"Walk Away"	Song of the Year	Shortlisted	
2022	"Stoney Creek"	Most Performed Blues and Roots Work	Nominated	
2023	"We Deserve to Dream"	Most Performed Blues and Roots Work	Won	
2025	"High Times"	Most Performed Blues & Roots Work	Nominated	

=== ARIA Music Awards ===
The ARIA Music Awards is an annual awards ceremony that recognises excellence, innovation, and achievement across all genres of Australian music. Rudd has been nominated for six awards.

Year	Nominee / work	Award	Result
2004	Solace	Breakthrough Artist – Album	Nominated
2004	Solace	Best Blues and Roots Album	Nominated
2006	Food in the Belly	Best Blues and Roots Album	Nominated
2007	White Moth	Best Blues and Roots Album	Nominated
2010	Koonyum Sun	Best World Music Album	Nominated
2026	Freedom Sessions / Where to Now	Best Blues and Roots Album	Nominated

=== Environmental Music Prize ===
The Environmental Music Prize is a quest to find a theme song to inspire action on climate and conservation. It commenced in 2022.

Year	Nominee / work	Award	Result	Ref.
2023	"Stoney Creek"	Environmental Music Prize	Won	

=== National Indigenous Music Awards ===
The National Indigenous Music Awards is an annual awards ceremony that recognises the achievements of Indigenous Australians in music. The award ceremony commenced in 2004. Electric Fields have won one award from four nominations.

Year	Nominee / work	Award	Result	Ref.
2022	"Ball and Chain" (featuring J-Milla)	Song of the Year	Nominated	
