= Taxiride discography =

List of Songs and Albums by Taxiride

- Studio albums: 4
- Singles: 11

This is a comprehensive listing of all official releases by Taxiride, an Australian rock band. Taxiride has released four studio albums and eleven singles.

== Albums ==
Name	Notes	Peak chart positions		Certification
Name	Notes	AUS	NZ	Certification
Imaginate	Released: 1 June 1999; Label: Warner, Sire	1	—	ARIA: 2× Platinum
Garage Mahal	Released: 10 July 2002; Label: Warner, Sire	5	30	ARIA: Platinum
Axiomatic	Released: 5 September 2005; Label: Victor Records, Mandarin Music	91	—	
Electrophobia	Released: 16 September 2006; Label: Blue Tiger Music, Liberation Blue	—	—	
"—" denotes a recording that did not chart in that territory.

== Singles ==
Year	Song	Peak chart positions			Certification	Album
Year	Song	AUS	NZ	US Mod.	Certification	Album
1999	"Get Set"	8	41	36		Imaginate
1999	"Everywhere You Go"	15	30	—	ARIA: Gold	Imaginate
2000	"Can You Feel"	35	—	—		Imaginate
2000	"Nothing in This World"	43	—	—		Imaginate
2002	"Creepin' Up Slowly"	6	19	—	ARIA: Platinum	Garage Mahal
2002	"How I Got This Way"	28	—	—		Garage Mahal
2003	"Afterglow"	49	—	—		Garage Mahal
2005	"Oh Yeah"	40	—	—		Axiomatic
2005	"You Gotta Help Me"	149	—	—		Axiomatic
2006	"What Can I Say"	—	—	—		Axiomatic
2006	"Everything's Changed"	—	—	—		Electrophobia
"—" denotes a recording that did not chart in that territory.
