= West Coast Blues & Roots Festival =

Music festival

- Genre: Blues, Roots
- Dates: March/April
- Locations: Fremantle, Western Australia
- Years active: 2004-2015, 2017-2019, 2021-?
- Founders: Sunset Events
- Website: Official website

The West Coast Blues 'n' Roots Festival is an annual music festival held in Fremantle, Western Australia. It features many blues and roots performers, both international and local.

== History ==
The festival was founded by Sunset Events and began as a two-day event in 2004 and was called the 'Sunset Live's Botanic Blues, Roots and Soul' held at Kings Park, Western Australia. From 2005, the event became a one-day event and was known as the West Coast Blues & Roots held at the Esplanade Park, Fremantle. In 2007, the event expanded to a two-day event and followed on into 2008. The 2009 event saw a return to a single day format. In 2010, the festival moved to Fremantle Park and has been there since 2010. To celebrate the 10th anniversary of the festival, organisers have announced the return two-day format for the 2013 lineup. The festival was not held in 2016 nor 2020. It is similar to the East Coast Blues & Roots Music Festival, which is held on the Easter long weekend in Byron Bay.

== Artist lineups ==
=== 2004 ===
Day 1

- James Brown
- The Cat Empire
- Bomba
- Xavier Rudd
- Blue Shaddy
- B Movie Heroes
- Dave Mann Collective
- Mark Hoffman
- Belly
- Lucky Oceans
- Lois Olney
- Simon Cox
- Ivan Zar
- Ben Witt

Day 2

- Michael Franti and Spearhead
- John Butler Trio
- Dr. John
- Taj Mahal
- Xavier Rudd
- Rick Steele
- Carus
- The Wah Trees
- Pink and White Bridge
- WAADA

=== 2005 ===
A promotion poster for West Coast Blues & Roots Festival 2005

- Jack Johnson
- Violent Femmes
- The Waifs
- Xavier Rudd
- Angélique Kidjo
- G. Love & Special Sauce
- The Beautiful Girls
- John Lee Hooker Jnr
- Bob Brozman & René Lacaille
- Carus
- Jeff Lang
- Joel Turner and the Modern Day Poets
- Eugene Hideaway Bridges
- Ash Grunwald
- Vasco Era
- Hat Fitz
- Zydecats
- Mia Dyson
- Mark Hoffman (Em Dee)
- Blue Shaddy
- Toby & Code Red
- B Movie Heroes
- Dom Mariani & The Majestic Kelp
- Saritah
- Dave Mann Collective
- Ben Witt & Ivan Zar
- Honeyriders
- Ric Steele
- 43 Cambridge
- Kill Devil Hills
- West Coast Blues Club Showcase

=== 2006 ===
A promotion poster for West Coast Blues & Roots Festival 2006

- Jackson Browne
- The Black Keys
- Bernard Fanning
- Michael Franti
- Damian Marley
- Pete Murray
- Jamie Cullum
- Donavon Frankenreiter
- The Beautiful Girls
- Keb' Mo'
- Mia Dyson
- Carus
- Lucky Oceans
- Ash Grunwald
- Blue King Brown
- Josh Pyke
- Bobby Blackbird
- Blue Shaddy

=== 2007 ===
Saturday, 31 March 2007

- John Butler Trio
- Wolfmother
- The Cat Empire
- Xavier Rudd
- Gomez
- Lee "Scratch" Perry
- Sierra Leone's Refugee All Stars
- Béla Fleck & The Flecktones
- Tony Joe White
- Eric Burdon & The Animals
- Bob Evans
- The Pilgram Brothers
- Blue King Brown
- The Vasco Era
- Diafrix
- The Bamboos
- The Fumes
- Andrew Winton
- Blue Shaddy
- Fall Electric

Sunday, 1 April 2007

- Ben Harper
- John Mayer
- Missy Higgins
- The Waifs
- Bo Diddley
- Larry Carlton Blues Project
- Eugene Hideaway Bridges
- Kaki King
- Angus & Julia Stone
- Terrance Simien
- Piers Faccini
- Amos Lee
- Carus and The True Believers
- Ben Kweller
- Custom Kings
- Dom Mariani and The Majestic Kelp
- Will Conner
- Kill Devil Hills

- The Dave Matthews Band and The Roots were originally included in the line up but were a late withdrawal and the spot was replaced by Xavier Rudd.

=== 2008 ===
Saturday, 15 March 2008

- Sinéad O'Connor
- Don McLean
- Buddy Guy
- Ray Davies
- Maceo Parker
- Gotye
- Ian Brown
- Keb' Mo'
- KT Tunstall
- Xavier Rudd
- The Cruel Sea
- Jeff Martin
- The Bellrays
- Clare Bowditch & The Feeding Set
- Angus & Julia Stone
- Jason Mraz
- Hayley Sales
- O.A.R.
- Lior
- Damien Dempsey
- The Basics
- Common Ground
- The Shinkickers
- Will Stoker & The Embers
- Sneaky Weasel Gang
- Rick Steele

Sunday, 16 March 2008

- John Fogerty
- Eskimo Joe
- Kasey Chambers
- Cat Empire
- Jools Holland's Rhythm and Blues Orchestra
- Ozomatli
- Vusi Mahlasela,
- Lee Ritenour
- Patty Griffin
- G. Love & Special Sauce
- The Beautiful Girls
- Galactic
- Salmonella Dub
- Mia Dyson
- Jeff Lang
- Seasick Steve
- The Audreys
- The Angry Tradesmen
- Sugarland
- Ivan Zar
- Worldfly
- Abbe May & The Rockin' Pneumonia
- Matt Gresham
- The Funkalleros

=== 2009 ===
- John Butler Trio
- Jason Mraz
- Missy Higgins
- Paul Kelly
- Zappa Plays Zappa
- Tony Joe White
- Augie March
- Ben Kweller
- Seasick Steve
- Easy Star All-Stars
- Blue King Brown
- Bob Evans
- Eric Bibb
- The Special Beat
- Luka Bloom
- Blues Traveler
- C. W. Stoneking & The Primitive Horn Orchestra
- Charlie Parr
- Little Red
- Ruthie Foster
- Kev Carmody
- LABJACD
- Rodney Crowe
- Whitley
- Kora
- Little Bushman
- Mama Kin
- Bonjah
- Mister And Sunbird

=== 2010 ===
Line-up:

- Crowded House
- John Butler Trio
- Buddy Guy
- Jeff Beck
- Newton Faulkner
- The Swell Season
- John Mayall
- Angus & Julia Stone
- Ozomatli
- Gogol Bordello
- Taj Mahal
- Lisa Mitchell
- Matisyahu
- Old Crow Medicine Show
- Edward Sharpe and the Magnetic Zeros
- The Backsliders
- Dave Hole
- Jon Cleary
- Dan Sultan
- Wagons
- Tijuana Cartel
- Hayley Sales
- Mary Gauthier
- The Blues Preachers
- Jordie Lane
- Andrew Winton
- Red Shoes Boy
- The Joe Kings
- The CBC Jazz Orchestra with Lee Sappho

=== 2011 ===
- Bob Dylan
- Grace Jones
- Elvis Costello and the Imposters
- The Cat Empire
- Rodrigo y Gabriela
- Geoffrey Gurrumul Yunupingu
- Michael Franti and Spearhead
- The Blind Boys of Alabama with Aaron Neville
- RocKwiz Live
- Mavis Staples
- Robert Randolph and the Family Band
- Toots and the Maytals
- Washington
- Ruthie Foster
- James Teague
- The 2011 West Coast Blues & Roots Festival also included a live showing of the popular music quiz show RocKwiz.

=== 2012 ===
- John Fogerty
- Crosby, Stills & Nash
- The Pogues
- The Specials
- My Morning Jacket
- Blitzen Trapper
- Buddy Guy
- Keb' Mo'
- Steve Earle
- Trombone Shorty & Orleans Avenue
- Gin Wigmore
- Husky
- The Sheepdogs
- Zydecats
- Felicity Groom
- Ruby Boots
- The Seals

=== 2013 ===
Saturday, 23 March 2013

- Robert Plant
- Iggy & The Stooges
- Chris Isaak
- Jason Mraz
- Status Quo
- Manu Chao
- Tedeschi Trucks Band
- Fred Wesley and the New JBs
- Newton Faulkner
- Julia Stone
- The Music Maker Blues Revue
- Kitty, Daisy & Lewis
- Grace Potter
- Russell Morris
- Mama Kin
- Blue Shaddy
- Breakthrough Winner

Sunday, 24 March 2013

- Paul Simon
- Ben Harper with Charlie Musselwhite
- Santana
- Steve Miller Band
- Wilco
- Bonnie Raitt
- Jimmy Cliff
- Rufus Wainwright
- Michael Kiwanuka
- Gossling
- Ash Grunwald
- Graveyard Train
- Brothers Grim
- The Brow Horn Orchestra
- Sticky Fingers
- The Domnicks
- Davey Craddock and The Spectacles

=== 2014 ===
- John Mayer
- Dave Matthews Band
- Elvis Costello and the Imposters
- The Doobie Brothers
- Erykah Badu
- Matt Corby
- Boy & Bear
- Michael Franti & Spearhead
- Jake Bugg
- Edward Sharpe and the Magnetic Zeros
- Gary Clark Jr.
- Steve Earle & The Dukes
- Morcheeba
- Russell Morris
- The Soul Rebels
- Dave Hole

=== 2015 ===
- John Butler Trio
- Paolo Nutini
- David Gray
- Paul Kelly
- Jurassic 5
- Rodrigo y Gabriela
- George Clinton & Parliament Funkadelic
- Xavier Rudd and the United Nations
- Jimmy Cliff
- Keb' Mo'
- Mavis Staples
- Beth Hart
- Kim Churchill
- Lanie Lane

== See also ==
- East Coast International Blues & Roots Music Festival
- List of blues festivals
- List of folk festivals
