= Tim Watson (musician) =

Australian musician (born 1971)

- Born: Timothy Harcourt Watson; 3 June 1971 (age 54); Melbourne, Victoria, Australia
- Genres: Pop, rock
- Occupations: Singer-songwriter, record producer, movie reviewer
- Instruments: Vocals, guitar
- Years active: 1994–present
- Member of: Taxiride, Friends of Mine
- Website: taxiride-ttsar.com.au

Timothy Harcourt Watson (born 3 June 1971) is the lead singer of Australian indie electronic band Friends of Mine and was a founding lead singer, hit songwriter and guitarist of Australian pop-rock band Taxiride. Raised in Melbourne, Watson was involved in several original projects before forming Taxiride with Tim Wild on vocals and guitars in 1996. With Taxiride, he had a top-10 hit on the Australian Recording Industry Association (ARIA) Singles Chart with "Get Set" and a No. 1 album with Imaginate in 1999 on the related Albums Chart. With Wild, Watson wrote the #15 ARIA charting hit 'Everywhere You Go'. The band won an ARIA award and undertook national and international tours. Their highest charting single, "Creepin' Up Slowly" was co-written by Watson and peaked at No. 6 in 2002 from the related album, Garage Mahal. In 2003, Watson left Taxiride, and after several ventures in songwriting and producing joined forces with DJ Jono Fernandez in late 2006. They began writing and recording in a backyard studio in Melbourne as Friends of Mine. He is also a movie reviewer on radio programme Andy Grace's Night Show.

== Biography ==
Timothy Harcourt Watson was born on 3 June 1971 in Melbourne, Victoria, and was raised there. From 1994, he was a singer and guitarist of various bands on the club circuit; he met Tim Wild, and the pair started writing songs together. Both were members of successive bands, Jungle Juice, Captain Spalding Band, and Hollywood Zoo, which all performed cover versions. They formed Taxiride in 1996 with Watson on guitar and vocals, Wild on guitar and vocals, Jason Singh on guitar and vocals, and Dan Hall on bass guitar, piano and vocals. They were signed to a United States label, Sire Records, and released their debut single, "Get Set". It was followed by Taxiride's debut album, Imaginate, in October 1999. The album hit No. 1 on the ARIA Albums Chart and went double platinum. The single peaked in the top 10 and won the Breakthrough Artist – Single ARIA Award for 1999. To support the global release of their debut album, the band toured Australia, America, Japan and Europe through 1999 and 2000.

Their highest-charting single, "Creepin' Up Slowly", was co-written by Watson with fellow band members Singh and Wild, and with Underground Productions' Dow Brain and Brad Young. It peaked at No. 6 on the ARIA charts in June 2002 from their second album, Garage Mahal, which was released in July. In 2004, Watson left Taxiride to pursue a career in songwriting and record production.

Watson joined forces with electronic dance DJ Jono Fernandez in late 2006. Fernandez released Girl Vs Boy, which featured Watson. They began writing and recording in a backyard studio in Melbourne as Friends of Mine. He is also a movie reviewer on radio programme Andy Grace's Night Show. Their first video, for the song "Can't See Straight", was completed in 2009.

As of 2021, Watson is a teacher at Australian arts university Collarts.
