= Afterglow (Taxiride song) =

2003 single by Taxiride

Single by Taxiride

from the album Garage Mahal
- B-side: "Nevermind"; "Get Set 2002"; "Forrest for the Trees" (live); "Enemy" (live)
- Released: 10 February 2003
- Length: 4:08
- Label: WEA
- Songwriters: Jason Singh; Tim Wild; Tim Watson
- Producers: Fred Maher; Taxiride

Taxiride singles chronology
"How I Got This Way" (2002)	"Afterglow" (2003)	"Oh Yeah" (2005)

"Afterglow" is a song by Australian rock band Taxiride, written by band members Jason Singh, Tim Wild, and Tim Watson. It was released on 10 February 2003 as the third and final single from their second studio album, Garage Mahal (July 2002). It reached No. 49 on the Australian ARIA Singles Chart.

== Track listing ==
Australian maxi-CD single
No.	Title	Writer(s)	Producer	Length
1.	"Afterglow"	Jason Singh, Tim Wild, Tim Watson,	Fred Maher, Taxiride	4:08
2.	"Nevermind"	Singh, Wild	David Carr, Taxiride	3:40
3.	"Get Set 2002"	Wild	Carr, Taxiride	3:58
4.	"Forrest for the Trees" (live in Tokyo, 2002)	Singh, Wild, Watson, Dan Hall	Dave Rees	3:25
5.	"Enemy" (live in Tokyo, 2002)	Singh, Wild	Rees	4:12
6.	"How I Got This Way" (music video)	Singh, Watson, Wild

- Tracks 4 and 5 were recorded live at Club Quattro, Tokyo, on 24 October 2002.

== Charts ==
Weekly chart performance for "Afterglow"
Chart (2003)	Peak position
Australia (ARIA)	49
