= Australian College of the Arts =

Australian independent tertiary education provider

Australian College of the Arts (Collarts)
- Other name: Collarts
- Former name: AusMusic
- Established: 1993
- Dean: Dr Tim Moss
- Students: 2,000
- Location: Collingwood and Fitzroy, Melbourne; Waterloo, Sydney, Australia
- Campus: Urban
- Website: http://www.collarts.edu.au

Australian College of the Arts Pty Ltd (Collarts) is an Australian independent tertiary education provider, with four campuses in Melbourne, and one campus in Sydney.

Originally operating as AusMusic, Collarts was founded in 1993 and offers certificates, diplomas, degrees, and postgraduate courses across music, performing arts, film and screen, design, fashion, and entertainment management. Collarts’ courses are delivered online and on campus, with a vibrant student community of more than 2,000 students from over 30 countries and 50 high schools.

Collarts also works closely with a number of secondary schools to provide VET music programs, offering music programmes to school students.

Collarts has four campuses across Melbourne, on Wellington Street and Cromwell Street in Collingwood, and George Street and Brunswick Street in Fitzroy.

As of February 2026, Collarts has expanded its creative arts education footprint into Sydney through the acquisition of International Screen Academy - the parent organisation of Sydney Actors School and Sydney Film School based in Waterloo, Sydney, Australia. Collarts’ new Sydney campus is based at Waterloo studios - Waterloo, Sydney, Australia.

In the 2024 Quality Indicators for Learning and Teaching (QILT) national Student Experience Surveys, students ranked Collarts as Australia’s number one provider of creative arts courses for Teaching Quality and Engagement, and number one for Overall Graduate Satisfaction.

== Acquisition ==
In 2017, Collarts acquired the Mercer School of Interior Design, to expand further into the creative arts education industry. The merger coincided with the introduction of two courses: Music Production and Content Creation.

In 2026, Collarts acquired International Screen Academy - the parent organisation of Sydney Actors School and Sydney Film School based in Waterloo, Sydney, Australia.

== Accreditation ==
- Registered Higher Education Provider
- Registered Training Organisation
- Accredited by the Tertiary Education Quality and Standards Agency (TEQSA)
- Accredited by the Australian Skills Quality Authority (ASQA)
- Registered on the Commonwealth Register of Institutions and Courses for Overseas Students (CRICOS)
- Member of the Australian Council of Private Education and Training (ACPET)
- Nationally recognised under the Australian Qualifications Framework

== Courses ==
Collarts offers undergraduate courses in:

- Acting
- 2D Animation
- Audio Production
- Circus Arts
- Comedy Writing & Performance
- Digital & Social Media
- Entertainment Management
- Event management
- Fashion Marketing
- Fashion & Sustainability
- Game design
- Interior design
- Journalism and New Media
- Music Performance
- Music Production
- Photography
- Screen and media
- Stage management
- Writing and Directing

Bachelor degrees are offered in Trimesters, and are completed within 2 years at a full time study load.

As of 2025, Collarts collaborates with the National Institute of Circus Arts (NICA) to continue delivering their VET courses and a Bachelor of Circus Arts program, which was facilitated by Swinburne University of Technology. Collarts accredits the courses delivered by NICA and delivers academic guidance and regulation.

Collarts also offers postgraduate courses in:

- Graduate Certificate in Higher Education (Creative Arts)
- Graduate Diploma of Creative Industries
- Master of Creative Industries

== Notable staff ==
- Ella Hooper – 4-time ARIA Music Awards winner and co-founder of Killing Heidi and The Verses
- Jesse Hooper – 4-time ARIA Music Awards winner and co-founder of Killing Heidi and The Verses. Jesse has collaborated and worked with major producers including Mark Opitz (INXS, AC/DC, The Divinyls), Mitchell Froom (Crowded House, The Pretenders) and John Travis (Kid Rock, Social Distortion, Buck Cherry).
- Tommy Rando – Australian performer, producer, singer-songwriter and composer. In 2012 Tommy went on to work alongside producer Mark Ronson and toured France with Paulo Nutini. Tommy has also written and produced songs for Vanessa Amorosi, Australian Idol artists Lee Harding, Anthony Callea and Casey Donavan. In 2004, Tommy co-wrote the song 'Wasabi’ which hit number one on the Australian ARIA charts (performed by Australian Idol finalist, Lee Harding).
- Chrissie Vincent – an educator and music and entertainment industry stalwart who has worked with The Rolling Stones, Lenny Kravitz, David Bowie, Sex Pistols, The Smashing Pumpkins, Rod Stewart, and Australian artists and bands such as The Living End, Pete Murray, Don Walker, Jeff Lang, Tim Rogers and Tex Perkins.
- Lucy Hayes – AACTA award-winning film and television producer. Lucy's television credits include the animated series Supa Phresh for Nickelodeon and multiple animated segments for Sesame Street. In 2016, Lucy worked across the development of Disney's live action Aladdin as well as the production of the LEGO films, and Stephen King's IT.
- Tim Westhaven – an Oscar and BAFTA award-winning technical director for film and games. Tim has worked on many films, including Batman Begins, Final Destination and The Tale of Despereaux.
- Zac Abroms – Director of Viceroyalty who manages ARIA-winning & nominated recording artists, songwriters and producers including Alice Ivy, Tasker and Ashli. Additionally, Zac has provided consultancy services to clients such as Universal, Sony and artists including Grammy award-winners Kimbra and Tom Waits, Jessie Ware, Gang of Youths, Bertie Blackman, Regina Spektor and more.
- Tim Watson – Member of ARIA Award winning group Taxiride.
- Tim Wild – Member of ARIA Award winning group Taxiride.
- Nicolas Coghlan – Australian actor known for Nowhere Boys, Nowhere Boys: The Book of Shadows, and 'Neighbours'.
- Brett Langsford – composed, recorded and performed with the Adelaide Symphony Orchestra, Dan Sultan, The Verses (Ella Hooper), Paris Wells and many more. He has also supported Jimmy Barnes, Kasey Chambers, Counting Crows and Fleetwood Mac on their 2009 Australian tour.
- Simon Ashford – Worked in animation on projects such as Balto, The Tales of Beatrix Potter, and The Silver Brumby.
- Andrea Powell – comedian and writer with many TV credits including The Panel, Kath and Kim and Micaleff Tonight.
- Christina Simons – acclaimed international documentary photographer. Her work has been featured in The New York Times, BBC Online, Newsweek, The Wall Street Journal, and The Guardian.
- Broden Kelly – Member of comedy group Aunty Donna
- Dallas Frasca – Front-woman of Dallas Frasca
- Steve "Stevic" Mackay – Lead guitarist of Twelve Foot Ninja
- Ben O’Hara – Owner and operator of music business resource centre thebiz.com.au
- Luke Cincotta – Australian music producer and audio engineer, who has worked with artists such as Karnivool, Jet, Dead Letter Circus, and Airbourne.
- Jon Toogood – Frontman of the New Zealand rock band Shihad
- Jason Torrens – Member of bands Bugdust and The Reefers, and owner/manager of Debasement Recording Studios.
- Tristan Meredith is an AACTA award-winning sound designer. Tristan has worked as a sound designer for Melbourne International Film Festival, Vic Screen and Screen Australia.

== Alumni ==
- Carla Bonner – Australian actress who played Steph Scully on the Soap Opera 'Neighbours'.
