= 2010 in Australian music =

The following is a list of notable events and releases that happened or were expected to happen in 2010 in Australian music.

== Events ==
=== January ===
- 17-31 January – Big Day Out 2010 is held in Sydney, Melbourne, Perth, Adelaide and the Gold Coast, headlined by Muse and Powderfinger. Dancehall artist Beenie Man is withdrawn from the lineup by the festival organisers.

=== July ===
- 30 July–1 August – Splendour in the Grass 2010 is held in Woodford, Queensland, headlined by The Strokes, Pixies and Ben Harper & Relentless7.

== Albums released ==
=== January ===
- 15: The Sunny Cowgirls — Summer

=== February ===
- 19: Eddy Current Suppression Ring — Rush to Relax
- 26: M-Phazes — Good Gracious

=== March ===
- 12: Angus & Julia Stone — Down the Way
- 12: Calling All Cars – Hold Hold Fire
- 12: MM9 – The Air Between
- 19: John Williamson — Absolute Greatest: 40 Years of True Blue
- 22: Gabriella Cilmi — Ten
- 26: Mantra — Power of the Spoken

=== April ===
- 9: Gyroscope — Cohesion
- 9: Katie Noonan and The Captains — Emperor's Box
- 9: James Reyne — TCB
- 16: The Bedroom Philosopher — Songs from the 86 Tram
- 26: John Butler Trio — April Uprising
- 26: Operator Please — Gloves
- 30: British India — Avalanche
- 30: Sara Storer — Calling Me Home: The Best of Sara Storer

=== May ===
- 7: Maundz — Mr. Nobody
- 14: Spit Syndicate — Exile
- 14: Dead Letter Circus – This is the Warning
- 21: Tame Impala — Innerspeaker
- 21: Deez Nuts — This One's for You
- 28: Catherine Britt — Catherine Britt
- 28: Midnight Juggernauts — The Crystal Axis

=== June ===
- 11: Cloud Control — Bliss Release
- 11: Crowded House — Intriguer
- 11: The Paradise Motel — Australian Ghost Story
- 18: The Amity Affliction – Youngbloods
- 18: Sia — We Are Born
- 18: Cola Wars — Invader
- 25: The Cat Empire — Cinema
- 25: Parkway Drive — Deep Blue

=== July ===
- 2: Eloqour — Charge
- 2: The Wilson Pickers — Shake It Down
- 5: Basement Birds — Basement Birds
- 9: Shane Howard — Goanna Dreaming
- 16: Erika — Sweeter Side
- 16: Dan Kelly — Dan Kelly's Dream
- 16: Maggot Mouf — You're All Ears
- 16: PVT — Church With No Magic
- 23: Birds of Tokyo — Birds of Tokyo
- 23: Skryptcha — The Numbers
- 30: Bliss n Eso — Running On Air
- 30: Washington — I Believe You, Liar

=== August ===
- 6: Dom Mariani — Rewind and Play
- 13: Custom Kings — Great Escape
- 13: Steve Forde — Hurricane
- 13: Papa VS Pretty — Heavy Harm
- 13: The Verses — Seasons
- 20: Adam Brand — It's Gonna Be OK
- 20: Miami Horror — Illumination
- 20: Stan Walker — From the Inside Out
- 27: Children Collide — Theory of Everything

=== September ===
- 3: Koolism — The 'Umu
- 10: Little Red — Midnight Remember
- 10: Old Man River — Trust
- 10: The Tongue — Alternative Energy
- 17: Kasey Chambers — Little Bird
- 17: Dialectrix — Audio Projectile
- 20: Shihad — Ignite
- 24: The Holidays — Post Paradise

=== October ===
- 1: Bag Raiders — Bag Raiders
- 1: Lior — Tumbling into the Dawn
- 8: The Audreys — Sometimes the Stars
- 8: Stealing O'Neal — Don't Sleep
- 8: You Am I — You Am I

== Number-ones in 2010 ==
Record charts in Australia are published by the Australian Recording Industry Association every week.

=== Singles ===
The longest-running number-one singles in 2010 so far are Usher's "OMG" and Eminem's "Love the Way You Lie", both topping the chart for six consecutive weeks.

=== Albums ===
Susan Boyle's I Dreamed a Dream was the number-one album for eleven non-consecutive weeks of 2010.

== Top 10 Singles ==
This is a list of singles that peaked in the Top 10 of the Australian Singles Chart during 2010. The date is when the song entered the Top 10 for the first time. Songs that were still in the top 10 at the beginning of 2010 but peaked in 2009 are listed as well. Songs that entered the top 10 in 2010 but did not peak until 2011 will be listed in List of top 10 singles in 2011 (Australia). An asterisk (*) in the "Weeks in Top 10" column shows that the song is still in the top 10 and therefore the number of weeks could change.

Entry Date	Single	Artist	Peak	Peak reached	Weeks
Singles from 2009
21 December	"Fireflies"	Owl City	#1	4 January	15
14 December	"Whatcha Say"	Jason Derülo	#5	4 January	10
Singles from 2010
4 January	"Replay"	Iyaz	#1	8 February	12
18 January	"Blah Blah Blah"	Kesha feat. 3OH!3	#3	8 February	8
18 January	"Haven't Met You Yet"	Michael Bublé	#9	18 January	3
25 January	"Rock That Body" ^{[A]}	The Black Eyed Peas	#7	29 March	3
1 February	"Little Lion Man"	Mumford & Sons	#3	8 February	3
8 February	"Memories"	David Guetta feat. Kid Cudi	#3	8 March	9
8 February	"Do You Remember"	Jay Sean feat. Sean Paul & Lil Jon	#7	15 February	4
15 February	"Today Was a Fairytale"	Taylor Swift	#3	22 February	5
22 February	"In My Head"	Jason Derülo	#1	22 February	10
22 February	"Tik Tok (Parody)"	Midnight Beast	#4	8 March	4
22 February	"Rude Boy"	Rihanna	#1	8 March	6
22 February	"3 Words" ^{[B]}	Cheryl Cole feat. will.i.am	#5	22 March	6
1 March	"Telephone" ^{[C]}	Lady Gaga feat. Beyoncé	#3	29 March	4
8 March	"Hey, Soul Sister"	Train	#1	22 March	11
29 March	"Imma Be"	The Black Eyed Peas	#7	29 March	2
29 March	"If We Ever Meet Again"	Timbaland feat. Katy Perry	#9	5 April	2
5 April	"I Made It (Cash Money Heroes)"	Kevin Rudolf feat. Birdman, Jay Sean & Lil' Wayne	#4	5 April	4
5 April	"I Like That"	Richard Vission feat. Luciana & Static Revenger	#3	12 April	6
12 April	"Baby"	Justin Bieber feat. Ludacris	#3	3 May	5
12 April	"Nothin' on You"	B.o.B feat. Bruno Mars	#3	10 May	8
12 April	"You've Got the Love"	Florence + The Machine	#9	12 April	1
19 April	"Just Say So"	Brian McFadden feat. Kevin Rudolf	#1	19 April	7
19 April	"Whataya Want from Me"	Adam Lambert	#4	26 April	5
19 April	"Alejandro"	Lady Gaga	#2	26 April	5
19 April	"OMG"	Usher feat. will.i.am	#1	10 May	13
3 May	"Mr. Mysterious"	Vanessa Amorosi feat. Seany B	#4	10 May	2
10 May	"Ridin' Solo"	Jason Derülo	#4	14 June	7
17 May	"Break Your Heart"	Taio Cruz feat. Ludacris	#2	17 May	7
17 May	"Not Afraid" ^{[D]}	Eminem	#4	17 May	12
17 May	"Airplanes"	B.o.B feat. Hayley Williams	#2	24 May	12
24 May	"California Gurls"	Katy Perry feat. Snoop Dogg	#1	21 June	16
24 May	"We No Speak Americano"	Yolanda Be Cool & DCUP	#4	24 May	8
24 May	"Your Love Is My Drug"	Kesha	#3	31 May	6
7 June	"Jessie's Girl"	Glee Cast	#8	7 June	1
7 June	"Gettin' Over You"	David Guetta & Chris Willis feat. Fergie & LMFAO	#5	21 June	7
7 June	"Opposite of Adults"	Chiddy Bang	#10	7 June	1
14 June	"Billionaire" ^{[E]}	Travie McCoy feat. Bruno Mars	#5	19 July	10
14 June	"Lying"	Amy Meredith	#10	14 June	1
28 June	"I Like It"	Enrique Iglesias feat. Pitbull	#2	12 July	11
5 July	"Smile"	Uncle Kracker	#3	5 July	4
5 July	"Love The Way You Lie"	Eminem feat. Rihanna	#1	19 July	15
19 July	"If I Had You"	Adam Lambert	#4	26 July	9
26 July	"I Hate Mondays"	Newton Faulkner	#8	26 July	1
26 July	"DJ Got Us Fallin' In Love"	Usher feat. Pitbull	#3	2 August	13
2 August	"Club Can't Handle Me"	Flo Rida feat. David Guetta	#3	16 August	9
2 August	"Dynamite"	Taio Cruz	#1	30 August	14
9 August	"Teenage Dream"	Katy Perry	#2	6 September	11
16 August	"Mine"	Taylor Swift	#9	16 August	1
30 August	"Take It Off"	Kesha	#5	6 September	5
6 September	"Just the Way You Are"	Bruno Mars	#1	25 October	12
13 September	"Like It's Her Birthday"	Good Charlotte	#7	13 September	1
13 September	"F**k You!"	Cee-Lo Green	#5	11 October	8
20 September	"Just A Dream"^{[F]}	Nelly	#3	25 October	10
20 September	"Cooler Than Me"	Mike Posner	#4	11 October	9
27 September	"Only Girl (In The World)"	Rihanna	#1	27 September	13
4 October	"Planets"	Short Stack	#4	4 October	1
4 October	"Magic"	B.o.B feat. Rivers Cuomo	#5	4 October	4
18 October	"Raise Your Glass"	Pink	#1	18 October	12
25 October	"Freefallin'"	Zoe Badwi	#9	25 October	2
25 October	"Hey Baby (Drop It To The Floor)"	Pitbull feat. T-Pain	#10	25 October	1
1 November	"Like A G6"	Far East Movement feat. The Cataracs & Dev	#2	15 November	10
1 November	"Barbra Streisand"	Duck Sauce	#9	1 November	2
8 November	"We R Who We R"	Kesha	#1	8 November	10
8 November	"Firework"	Katy Perry	#3	29 November	11
8 November	"Heartbeat"	Enrique Iglesias & Nicole Scherzinger	#5	15 November	4
15 November	"The Time (Dirty Bit)"	The Black Eyed Peas	#1	22 November	10
22 November	"F**kin' Perfect"	Pink	#10	22 November	1
29 November	"Yeah 3X"	Chris Brown	#4	27 December	13
29 November	"Somewhere In The World"	Altiyan Childs	#8	29 November	1
6 December	"Who's That Girl?"	Guy Sebastian feat. Eve	#1	27 December	10
6 December	"Grenade"	Bruno Mars	#1	13 December	10
13 December	"Stay The Night"	James Blunt	#10	13 December	1
20 December	"Saturday Night"	Jessica Mauboy feat. Ludacris	#7	27 December	4

Notes:

- ^{A} – First entered the Top 10 on 25 January 2010 where it spent 2 weeks, the song re-entered the Top 10 on 29 March 2010.
- ^{B} – First entered the Top 10 on 22 February 2010 where it spent 1 week, the song re-entered the Top 10 on 29 March 2010.
- ^{C} – First entered the Top 10 on 1 March 2010 where it spent 1 week, the song re-entered the Top 10 on 22 March 2010.
- ^{D} – First entered the Top 10 on 17 May 2010 where it spent 1 week, the song re-entered the Top 10 on 21 June 2010.
- ^{E} – First entered the Top 10 on 14 June 2010 where it spent 9 weeks, the song re-entered the Top 10 on 23 August 2010
- ^{F} – First entered the Top 10 on 20 September 2010 where it spent 1 weeks, the song re-entered the Top 10 on 11 October 2010.

== 2009 Peaks ==
- "I Gotta Feeling" by The Black Eyed Peas – Weeks: 21, Peak: #1 ^{[A]}
- "Tik Tok" by Kesha – Weeks: 17, Peak: #1
- "Bad Romance" by Lady Gaga – Weeks: 14, Peak: #2
- "Black Box" by Stan Walker – Weeks: 9, Peak #2 (#1 for 13 weeks on the download chart, and #1 for 12 weeks on the Video Hits chart)
- "Starstrukk" by 3OH!3 featuring Katy Perry – Weeks: 9, Peak: #4
- "Empire State of Mind" by Jay-Z and Alicia Keys – Weeks: 13, Peak #4
- "Down" by Jay Sean featuring Lil Wayne – Weeks: 12, Peak: #2
- "Art of Love" by Guy Sebastian featuring Jordin Sparks – Weeks: 5, Peak #8
- ^{A} – First entered the Top 10 on 15 June 2009 where it spent 20 weeks, the song re-entered the Top 10 on 11 January 2010.

== Entries by artist ==
The following table shows artists who have had the most top 10 entries in 2010. Unlike the main list, this table includes songs in the figures that reached their peak in 2009. The figures include both main artists and featured artists, while appearances on ensemble charity records are also counted for each artist.

Artist	Total
Kesha	5
Katy Perry ^{[A]}	5
Rihanna ^{[B]}	4
David Guetta ^{[C]}	4
Bruno Mars ^{[D]}	4
The Black Eyed Peas	4
Pitbull ^{[E]}	3
B.o.B	3
Jason Derülo	3
Lady Gaga	3
Jay Sean ^{[F]}	3

Notes:

- ^{A} – This includes appearances on both 3OH!3's single "Starstrukk" and Timbaland's single "If We Ever Meet Again".
- ^{B} – This includes appearances on both Eminem's single "Love The Way You Lie" and David Guetta's single "Who's That Chick?."
- ^{C} – This includes an appearance on Flo Rida's single "Club Can't Handle Me".
- ^{D} – This includes appearances on both B.o.B's single "Nothin' On You" and Travie McCoy's single "Billionaire".
- ^{E} – This includes appearances on both Enrique Iglesias' single "I Like It" and Usher's single "DJ Got Us Fallin' In Love".
- ^{F} – This includes an appearance on Kevin Rudolf's single "I Made It (Cash Money Heroes)".

=== Compilations ===
So Fresh: The Hits of Autumn 2010 remained as the number-one compilation album for five non-consecutive weeks of 2010.

=== Music DVDs ===
Pink's Funhouse Tour: Live in Australia has reached the top spot in 2010 for ten consecutive weeks.

=== Video Hits Top 20 Singles Chart ===
The Video Hits Top 20 chart comes from Channel Ten's singles chart show, it closes every Sunday show with the week's #1 ARIA chart single. The longest-running #1 single on the Video Hits Top 20 Chart throughout 2010 so far is Stan Walker's "Black Box", topping the chart for twelve consecutive weeks of 2010.
