= Rolling Through This World =

Studio album by Bob Brozman, Jeff Lang with Angus Diggs
- Released: 2002
- Recorded: January 2002
- Venue: Brighton, Victoria, Australia
- Genre: Americana
- Label: Shock Records
- Producer: Jeff Lang, Bob Brozman

Jeff Lang albums chronology
Everything Is Still (2001)	Rolling Through This World (2002)	No Point Slowing Down (Live in the USA) (2003)

Rolling Through This World is a collaborative studio album, credited to American guitarist Bob Brozman and Australian musician Jeff Lang with Angus Diggs. Rolling Through This World was released in Australia in 2002.

At the ARIA Music Awards of 2002, the album won the ARIA Award for Best Blues and Roots Album.

== Background ==
Brozman and Lang met when they both performed at the 2000 Woodford Festival in Australia. The two jammed together during each other's sets and improvised without rehearsal. It was agreed that they would play some shows together and record a project together during Brozman's January 2002 Australian tour. Rolling Through This World is the result of four days recording in Melbourne in January 2002.

== Reception ==
Sydney Morning Herald said "..two hugely talented guitar show-offs demonstrate just exactly what can be done when they decide to stretch their considerable skills. There are moments when you gasp and want to ask, 'How did you do that, you flashy pair of bastards?' as the two duck and dive around each other in amazing displays of cleverness. The interplay of the two guitars is glorious, the way the guitars weave around each other is just simply amazing."

== Track listing ==
1. "61 Highway" (Fred McDowell) - 4:52
2. "Danville Girl" (Dock Boggs) - 4:16
3. "Rolling Through This World" (Bob Brozman) - 6:15
4. "The Changeling" (Chris Wilson) - 6:06
5. "Cypress Grove" (Skip James) - 5:30
6. "Black Back Train" (Traditional) - 5:26
7. "Get Lucky" (Brozman) - 5:04
8. "Telephone Arguing Blues" - 5:06
9. "Rooster Tail" (Lang) - 3:11
10. "Plucked Pigeon Soup-Hop" (Brozman) - 4:28
11. "Wipe It Off" (Lonnie Johnson) - 1:47

== Personnel ==
- Bob Brozman – vocal guitars
- Jeff Lang – vocals, guitars, chumbush
- Angus Diggs – drums
