= ARIA Award for Best International Artist =

Annual Australian music industry award

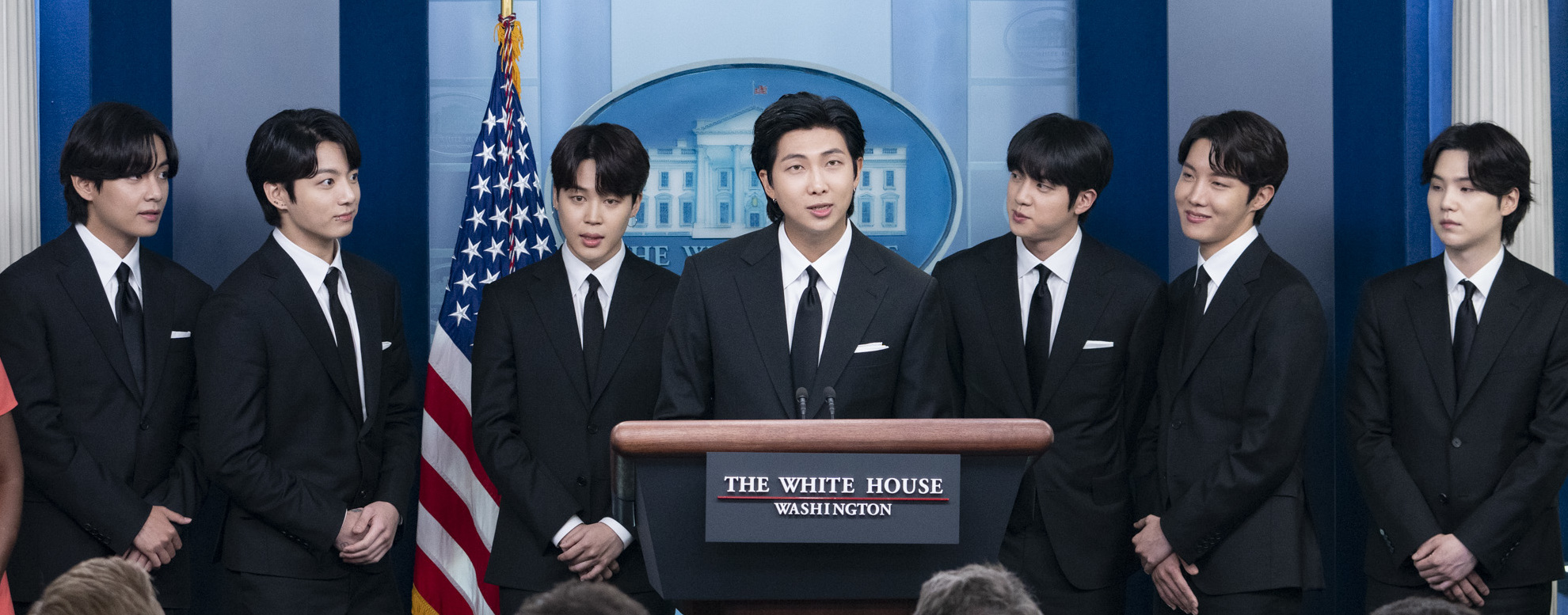
- 2026 winner BTS
- Country: Australia
- Presented by: Australian Recording Industry Association (ARIA)
- First award: 2010
- Currently held by: BTS, Arirang (2026)

Highlights
- Most wins: One Direction and Taylor Swift (5 each)
- Most nominations: Taylor Swift (13)
- Website: www.ariaawards.com.au

The ARIA Music Award for Best International Artist is an award presented at the annual ARIA Music Awards, which recognises the public performance of international artists in Australia. It was first handed in the 2010 ceremony under the name Most Popular International Artist.

The nominee pool for Best International Artist will be drawn from the ten highest selling artists, based on aggregated ARIA album and related single sales statistics for the charts published between the eligibility period.

One Direction and Taylor Swift are tied for the most wins with five each, though former One Direction member Harry Styles has also won three times as a solo artist, bringing his total to eight. All of One Direction's wins, which occurred from 2012 to 2016, were consecutive, followed by Styles' first solo win in 2017; Swift also had three consecutive wins from 2023 to 2025. Until 2026, Styles had won all of his nominations both with One Direction and solo. Swift also has the most nominations with 13, while Ed Sheeran has the most nominations without a win with 10.

== Winners and nominees ==
In the following table, the winner is highlighted in a separate colour, and in boldface; other nominees are those that are not highlighted or in boldface.

Winner marked in a separate colour

| Year | Winner(s) | Associated album(s) |
|---|---|---|
**2010** (24th)
| **2010** (24th) | **(England) Mumford & Sons** | —N/a |
| **2010** (24th) | (United States) Katy Perry | —N/a |
| **2010** (24th) | (United States) Lady Gaga | —N/a |
| **2010** (24th) | (Canada) Michael Bublé | —N/a |
| **2010** (24th) | (United States) Taylor Swift | —N/a |
| **2011** (25th) | | —N/a |
| **2011** (25th) | **(United States) Pink** | —N/a |
| **2011** (25th) | (England) Adele | —N/a |
| **2011** (25th) | (United States) Chris Brown | —N/a |
| **2011** (25th) | (United States) Jennifer Lopez | —N/a |
| **2011** (25th) | (England) Jessie J | —N/a |
| **2011** (25th) | (United States) Ke$ha | —N/a |
| **2011** (25th) | (United States) Lady Gaga | —N/a |
| **2011** (25th) | (United States) LMFAO | —N/a |
| **2011** (25th) | (United States) Pitbull | —N/a |
| **2011** (25th) | (Barbados) Rihanna | —N/a |
| **2012** (26th) | | —N/a |
| **2012** (26th) | **(England) / (Republic of Ireland) One Direction** | **Up All Night** |
| **2012** (26th) | (England) Adele | 21 |
| **2012** (26th) | (United States) The Black Keys | El Camino |
| **2012** (26th) | (United States) Bruno Mars | Doo-Wops & Hooligans |
| **2012** (26th) | (England) Coldplay | Mylo Xyloto |
| **2012** (26th) | (France) David Guetta | Nothing but the Beat |
| **2012** (26th) | (England) Ed Sheeran | + |
| **2012** (26th) | (England) Florence and the Machine | Ceremonials |
| **2012** (26th) | (United States) LMFAO | Sorry for Party Rocking |
| **2012** (26th) | (Canada) Michael Bublé | Christmas |
**2013** (27th)
| **2013** (27th) | **(England) / (Republic of Ireland) One Direction** | —N/a |
| **2013** (27th) | (England) Birdy | —N/a |
| **2013** (27th) | (United States) Bruno Mars | —N/a |
| **2013** (27th) | (England) Ed Sheeran | —N/a |
| **2013** (27th) | (United States) Macklemore & Ryan Lewis | —N/a |
| **2013** (27th) | (England) Mumford & Sons | —N/a |
| **2013** (27th) | (Iceland) Of Monsters and Men | —N/a |
| **2013** (27th) | (United States) Pink | —N/a |
| **2013** (27th) | (United States) Taylor Swift | —N/a |
| **2014** (28th) | | —N/a |
| **2014** (28th) | **(England) / (Republic of Ireland) One Direction** | **Midnight Memories** |
| **2014** (28th) | (Sweden) Avicii | True |
| **2014** (28th) | (United States) Beyoncé | Beyoncé |
| **2014** (28th) | (England) Coldplay | Ghost Stories |
| **2014** (28th) | (England) Ed Sheeran | x |
| **2014** (28th) | (United States) Eminem | The Marshall Mathers LP 2 |
| **2014** (28th) | (United States) Jason Derulo | Tattoos |
| **2014** (28th) | (United States) Katy Perry | Prism |
| **2014** (28th) | (New Zealand) Lorde | Pure Heroine |
| **2014** (28th) | (United States) Pharrell Williams | G I R L |
**2015** (29th)
| **2015** (29th) | **(England) / (Republic of Ireland) One Direction** | **Four** |
| **2015** (29th) | (Scotland) Calvin Harris | Motion |
| **2015** (29th) | (England) Ed Sheeran | x |
| **2015** (29th) | (United States) Foo Fighters | Sonic Highways |
| **2015** (29th) | (Republic of Ireland) Hozier | Hozier |
| **2015** (29th) | (England) James Bay | Chaos and the Calm |
| **2015** (29th) | (England) / (United States) Mark Ronson | Uptown Special |
| **2015** (29th) | (United States) Meghan Trainor | Title |
| **2015** (29th) | (England) Sam Smith | In the Lonely Hour |
| **2015** (29th) | (United States) Taylor Swift | 1989 |
**2016** (30th)
| **2016** (30th) | **(England) / (Republic of Ireland) One Direction** | **Made in the A.M. and Four** |
| **2016** (30th) | (England) Adele | 25 |
| **2016** (30th) | (United States) Beyoncé | Lemonade |
| **2016** (30th) | (England) Coldplay | A Head Full of Dreams |
| **2016** (30th) | (Canada) Drake | Views and If You're Reading This It's Too Late |
| **2016** (30th) | (Canada) Justin Bieber | Purpose |
| **2016** (30th) | (United States) Meghan Trainor | Title and Thank You |
| **2016** (30th) | (United States) Taylor Swift | 1989 |
| **2016** (30th) | (United States) Twenty One Pilots | Blurryface |
| **2016** (30th) | (Canada) The Weeknd | Beauty Behind the Madness |
**2017** (31st)
| **2017** (31st) | **(England) Harry Styles** | **Harry Styles** |
| **2017** (31st) | (England) Adele | 25 |
| **2017** (31st) | (United States) Bruno Mars | 24K Magic |
| **2017** (31st) | (England) Ed Sheeran | ÷ and Loose Change |
| **2017** (31st) | (United States) Kendrick Lamar | Damn and Untitled Unmastered |
| **2017** (31st) | (New Zealand) Lorde | Melodrama |
| **2017** (31st) | (United States) Metallica | Hardwired... to Self-Destruct |
| **2017** (31st) | (England) The Rolling Stones | Blue & Lonesome |
| **2017** (31st) | (Canada) Shawn Mendes | Illuminate |
| **2017** (31st) | (Canada) The Weeknd | Starboy |
**2018** (32nd)
| **2018** (32nd) | **(Cuba) / (Mexico) / (United States) Camila Cabello** | **Camila** |
| **2018** (32nd) | (Canada) Drake | Scorpion and More Life |
| **2018** (32nd) | (England) Ed Sheeran | ÷ |
| **2018** (32nd) | (United States) Eminem | Revival and Kamikaze |
| **2018** (32nd) | (United States) Imagine Dragons | Evolve |
| **2018** (32nd) | (United States) Khalid | American Teen |
| **2018** (32nd) | (United States) Pink | Beautiful Trauma |
| **2018** (32nd) | (United States) Post Malone | Beerbongs & Bentleys and Stoney |
| **2018** (32nd) | (England) Sam Smith | The Thrill of It All |
| **2018** (32nd) | (United States) Taylor Swift | Reputation |
**2019** (33rd)
| **2019** (33rd) | **(United States) Taylor Swift** | **Lover** |
| **2019** (33rd) | (United States) Ariana Grande | Thank U, Next |
| **2019** (33rd) | (United States) Billie Eilish | When We All Fall Asleep, Where Do We Go? |
| **2019** (33rd) | (England) Ed Sheeran | No.6 Collaborations Project |
| **2019** (33rd) | (England) George Ezra | Staying at Tamara's |
| **2019** (33rd) | (United States) Khalid | Free Spirit |
| **2019** (33rd) | (United States) Pink | Hurts 2B Human |
| **2019** (33rd) | (United States) Post Malone | Hollywood's Bleeding |
| **2019** (33rd) | (Canada) Shawn Mendes | Shawn Mendes |
| **2019** (33rd) | (United States) Travis Scott | Astroworld |
**2020** (34th)
| **2020** (34th) | **(England) Harry Styles** | **Fine Line** |
| **2020** (34th) | (England) Dua Lipa | Future Nostalgia & Dua Lipa |
| **2020** (34th) | (United States) Eminem | Music to Be Murdered By |
| **2020** (34th) | (United States) Halsey | Manic |
| **2020** (34th) | (United States) Juice Wrld | Legends Never Die |
| **2020** (34th) | (Canada) Justin Bieber | Changes |
| **2020** (34th) | (Scotland) Lewis Capaldi | Divinely Uninspired to a Hellish Extent |
| **2020** (34th) | (United States) Lizzo | Cuz I Love You |
| **2020** (34th) | (United States) Taylor Swift | Folklore |
| **2020** (34th) | (Canada) The Weeknd | After Hours |
**2021** (35th)
| **2021** (35th) | **(United States) Taylor Swift** | **Evermore** |
| **2021** (35th) | (United States) Ariana Grande | Positions |
| **2021** (35th) | (United States) Doja Cat | Planet Her |
| **2021** (35th) | (Canada) Justin Bieber | Justice |
| **2021** (35th) | (United States) Kanye West | Donda |
| **2021** (35th) | (United States) Luke Combs | What You See Ain't Always What You Get |
| **2021** (35th) | (United States) Machine Gun Kelly | Tickets to My Downfall |
| **2021** (35th) | (United States) Miley Cyrus | Plastic Hearts |
| **2021** (35th) | (United States) Olivia Rodrigo | Sour |
| **2021** (35th) | (United States) Pop Smoke | Shoot for the Stars, Aim for the Moon |
**2022** (36th)
| **2022** (36th) | **(England) Harry Styles** | **Harry's House** |
| **2022** (36th) | (Sweden) ABBA | Voyage |
| **2022** (36th) | (England) Adele | 30 |
| **2022** (36th) | (United States) Billie Eilish | Happier Than Ever |
| **2022** (36th) | (Canada) Drake | Certified Lover Boy |
| **2022** (36th) | (England) Ed Sheeran | = |
| **2022** (36th) | (United States) Jack Harlow | Come Home the Kids Miss You |
| **2022** (36th) | (United States) Lil Nas X | Montero |
| **2022** (36th) | (United States) Post Malone | Twelve Carat Toothache |
| **2022** (36th) | (United States) Taylor Swift | Red (Taylor's Version) |
**2023** (37th)
| **2023** (37th) | **(United States) Taylor Swift** | **Midnights** |
| **2023** (37th) | (United States) Beyoncé | Renaissance |
| **2023** (37th) | (Canada) Drake and (United Kingdom) / (United States) 21 Savage | Her Loss |
| **2023** (37th) | (England) Ed Sheeran | - |
| **2023** (37th) | (United States) Luke Combs | Gettin' Old |
| **2023** (37th) | (United States) Metro Boomin | Heroes & Villains |
| **2023** (37th) | (United States) Morgan Wallen | One Thing at a Time |
| **2023** (37th) | (Trinidad and Tobago) Nicki Minaj | Queen Radio |
| **2023** (37th) | (United States) Pink | Trustfall |
| **2023** (37th) | (United States) SZA | SOS |
**2024** (38th)
| **2024** (38th) | **(United States) Taylor Swift** | **The Tortured Poets Department** |
| **2024** (38th) | (United States) Ariana Grande | Eternal Sunshine |
| **2024** (38th) | (United States) Billie Eilish | Hit Me Hard and Soft |
| **2024** (38th) | (United States) Chappell Roan | The Rise and Fall of a Midwest Princess |
| **2024** (38th) | (England) Charli XCX | Brat |
| **2024** (38th) | (Canada) Drake | For All the Dogs |
| **2024** (38th) | (United States) Olivia Rodrigo | Guts |
| **2024** (38th) | (Canada) Tate McRae | Think Later |
| **2024** (38th) | (United States) Travis Scott | Utopia |
| **2024** (38th) | (United States) Zach Bryan | Zach Bryan |
**2025** (39th)
| **2025** (39th) | **(United States) Taylor Swift** | —N/a |
| **2025** (39th) | (United States) Alex Warren | You'll Be Alright, Kid |
| **2025** (39th) | (Scotland) Calvin Harris | 96 Months |
| **2025** (39th) | (United States) Gracie Abrams | The Secret of Us |
| **2025** (39th) | (United States) Kendrick Lamar | GNX |
| **2025** (39th) | (United States) Noah Kahan | Stick Season |
| **2025** (39th) | (United States) Post Malone | F-1 Trillion |
| **2025** (39th) | (United States) Sabrina Carpenter | Short n' Sweet |
| **2025** (39th) | (Canada) Tate McRae | So Close to What |
| **2025** (39th) | (United States) Tyler, the Creator | Chromakopia |
**2026** (40th)
| **2026** (40th) | **(South Korea) BTS** | **Arirang** |
| **2026** (40th) | (England) Ed Sheeran | Play |
| **2026** (40th) | (England) Harry Styles | Kiss All the Time. Disco, Occasionally |
| **2026** (40th) | (United States) Morgan Wallen | I'm the Problem |
| **2026** (40th) | (United States) Noah Kahan | The Great Divide |
| **2026** (40th) | (England) Olivia Dean | The Art of Loving |
| **2026** (40th) | (United States) Olivia Rodrigo | You Seem Pretty Sad for a Girl So in Love |
| **2026** (40th) | (United States) Sabrina Carpenter | Man's Best Friend |
| **2026** (40th) | (United States) Sombr | I Barely Know Her |
| **2026** (40th) | (United States) Taylor Swift | The Life of a Showgirl |

== Artists with multiple wins ==
| Awards | Artist |
|---|---|
| 8 | Harry Styles (Note: Including five as a member of One Direction.) |
| 5 | One Direction |
| 5 | Taylor Swift |

== Artists with multiple nominations ==
13 nominations

- Taylor Swift

10 nominations

- Ed Sheeran

9 nominations

- Harry Styles

5 nominations

- Adele
- One Direction
- Pink

4 nominations

- Post Malone

3 nominations

- Beyoncé
- Justin Bieber
- Coldplay
- Billie Eilish
- Eminem
- Ariana Grande
- Bruno Mars
- Olivia Rodrigo
- The Weeknd

2 nominations

- Michael Bublé
- Sabrina Carpenter
- Luke Combs
- Drake
- Calvin Harris
- Noah Kahan
- Lady Gaga
- Kendrick Lamar
- LMFAO
- Tate McRae
- Shawn Mendes
- Mumford & Sons
- Katy Perry
- Travis Scott
- Meghan Trainor
- Morgan Wallen

== Awards by country ==
Countries by wins
| Country | Wins | First win | Latest win | Artist/s |
|---|---|---|---|---|
| United Kingdom | 9 | 2010 | 2022 | Mumford & Sons, One Direction, Harry Styles |
| United States | 7 | 2011 | 2025 | Pink, Camila Cabello, Taylor Swift |
| Ireland | 5 | 2012 | 2016 | One Direction |
| Cuba | 1 | 2018 | | Camila Cabello |
| Mexico | 1 | 2018 | | Camila Cabello |
| South Korea | 1 | 2026 | | BTS |

Countries by nominations
| Country | Nominations | First nomination | Latest nomination | Artist/s |
|---|---|---|---|---|
| United States | 95 | 2010 | 2026 | Majority of nominees |
| United Kingdom | 46 | 2010 | 2026 | Mumford & Sons, Adele, Jessie J, One Direction, Coldplay, Ed Sheeran, Florence and the Machine, Birdy, Calvin Harris, James Bay, Mark Ronson, Sam Smith, Harry Styles, The Rolling Stones, George Ezra, Dua Lipa, Lewis Capaldi, 21 Savage, Charli XCX, Olivia Dean |
| Canada | 17 | 2010 | 2025 | Michael Bublé, Drake, Justin Bieber, The Weeknd, Shawn Mendes, Tate McRae |
| Ireland | 6 | 2012 | 2016 | One Direction, Hozier |
| New Zealand | 2 | 2014 | 2017 | Lorde |
| Sweden | 2 | 2014 | 2022 | Avicii, ABBA |
| Barbados | 1 | 2011 | | Rihanna |
| Cuba | 1 | 2018 | | Camila Cabello |
| France | 1 | 2012 | | David Guetta |
| Iceland | 1 | 2013 | | Of Monsters and Men |
| Mexico | 1 | 2018 | | Camila Cabello |
| South Korea | 1 | 2026 | | BTS |
| Trinidad and Tobago | 1 | 2023 | | Nicki Minaj |
