= Nothing in This World =

Nothing in This World may refer to:

- "Nothing in This World" (Paris Hilton song), 2006
- "Nothing in This World" (Keke Wyatt song), 2001
- "Nothing in This World" (Taxiride song), 2000
- "Nothin' in This World", a 2016 song by Idina Menzel from Idina
