= Bobby Singh (musician) =

- Born: England
- Genres: World Music

Bobby Singh, is an Australian tabla player. He was one of the musician responsible for the album Djan Djan which won the 2010 ARIA Award for Best World Music Album. Singh is also a member of Rasa Duende.

Djan Djan is an album by Mamadou Diabate, Bobby Singh & Jeff Lang. Diabate is a kora player and Lang is a guitarist. The three met during Diabate's 2008 tour of Australia and recorded the album in a single day in March of that year.

Singh was the subject of the documentary Viva, I Belong Everywhere that was broadcast nationally on SBS TV in May 2005.

== Discography ==
=== Albums ===
Title	Details	Peak positions
Title	Details	AUS
Aasha (with Adrian McNeil)	Released: 2001; Label: (VEDA.4); Formats: CD	—
Sawariya (with Jaspinder Narula)	Released: 2002; Label: Nuff (PGMX 1312); Formats: Cassette	—
Rouhani (with Joseph Tawadros)	Released: 2005; Label: ABC Classics (ABC 476 8078); Formats: CD	—
As Wide As the Sky (with Joseph Tawadros)	Released: 2007; Label: Birdland Records (BL 008); Formats: CD	—
Djan Djan (with Mamadou Diabate and Jeff Lang)	Released: 2010; Label: ABC (2723504); Formats: CD, digital	—
Kapture (with Sandy Evans)	Released: May 2015; Label: Rufus; Formats: CD, digital	—

== Awards and nominations ==
=== ARIA Music Awards ===
The ARIA Music Awards is an annual awards ceremony that recognises excellence, innovation, and achievement across all genres of Australian music. They commenced in 1987.

Year	Nominee / work	Award	Result	Ref.
2010	Djan Djan (with Mamadou Diabate and Jeff Lang)	Best World Music Album	Won	
