= Djan Djan =

Studio album by Mamadou Diabate, Bobby Singh and Jeff Lang
- Released: March 2010
- Recorded: March 2008 and January 2009
- Studio: 30 Mill Studios
- Label: ABC Music, UMA

Jeff Lang albums chronology
Chimeradour (2009)	Djan Djan (2010)	Carried in Mind (2011)

Djan Djan is a collaborative studio album, credited to Malian musician Mamadou Diabaté, and Australian musicians Bobby Singh and Jeff Lang. Djan Djan was released in Australia in March 2010.

At the ARIA Music Awards of 2010, the album won the ARIA Award for Best World Music Album.

== Background and release ==
Singh and Lang met when Mamadou, when he toured Australia in early 2008. Djan Djan was made on one day in March 2008. Originally released as a five track EP with limited pressing. The trio added extra tracks in January 2009 and released the album in March 2010.

== Track listing ==
2009 release

1. "Djan Djan" (Lang, Diabate)
2. "Mamalangsingh" (Singh, Lang, Diabate)
3. "She Said She Felt Broken" (Singh, Lang)
4. "Synaly Joh" (Singh, Diabate)
5. "We Brought You Here" (Lang)

2010 re-release

1. "Mamalangsingh" (Singh, Lang, Diabate)
2. "The Great Keppel" (Diabate)
3. "Adventure" (Diabate)
4. "Sandjibah" (Diabate)
5. "Djan Djan" (Lang, Diabate)
6. "Niger Blues" (Diabate)
7. "She Said She Felt Broken" (Singh, Lang)
8. "Synaly Joh" (Singh, Diabate)
9. "Spirit of Melbourne" (Diabate)
10. "We Brought You Here" (Lang) (featuring Ben Walsh, Bobby Singh, Greg Sheehan and The Circle the Rhythm)
