= Dan Hall (musician) =

Australian musician (1978–2026)

- Born: Daniel James Hall; 30 June 1978; London, England, United Kingdom
- Died: 13 November 2026 (aged 48) Melbourne, Victoria, Australia
- Genre: Rock
- Occupation: Singer-songwriter
- Instruments: Bass, electric guitar, piano, vocals
- Years active: 1990–2026
- Label: Dust Devil Music

Daniel James Hall (30 June 1978 – 13 November 2026) was an Australian musician who played in the rock bands Taxiride and Airway Lanes. With Taxiride, as bass guitarist, pianist and vocalist, he had a top 10 hit on the Australian Recording Industry Association (ARIA) singles chart with "Get Set" and a No. 1 album with Imaginate in 1999 on the related albums chart. He left Taxiride in 2001 to begin a solo career. He provided vocals for "Don't Look Back" which was used on the TV soap opera Neighbours. He later formed Airway Lanes in late 2004. They released their debut album, In Vino Veritas, in May 2008 with its lead single, "Don't Let Go", chosen as iTunes' Single of the Week.

He released the EPs Daniel James Hall in 2024 and For the Window Shopper in 2026.

== Career ==
Hall started his music career – primarily as a blues guitarist – in the early 1990s. From 1994, he performed as a busker at a street market in Camberwell. He began rapidly embracing new sounds by performing at various live venues around Melbourne. In 1997, Tim Wild recruited Hall to meet his friends Jason Singh and Tim Watson. By 1998, the unnamed group recorded a demo cassette which was given to a taxi driver friend who played it primarily to passengers. The band asked how it was received whilst on the taxi rides – which inspired the group's name, Taxiride.

Soon after, Taxiride signed a joint deal with Warner Music Group in Australia and Sire Records in the US, where they relocated to Ocean Way Recording studios in Los Angeles to work with producer Jack Joseph Puig. Their debut album, Imaginate, hit No. 1 on the ARIA Albums Chart and went double platinum. It spawned the top 10 hit "Get Set", which won the Breakthrough Artist – Single ARIA Award for 1999. To support the global release of their debut album, the band toured Australia, America, Japan and Europe through 1999 and 2000.

In 2001, Hall decided to leave Taxiride after the first album to pursue his solo career and refine his song writing. He said he was unhappy with "the pop direction the band was taking".

He collaborated with his former Taxiride bandmates to co-write a track for their third album, Axiomatic. Prior to Taxiride's release of their live acoustic album, Electrophobia, in September 2006, Hall reconnected with the band members to co-write more songs.

=== Airway Lanes ===
After leaving Taxiride in 2001, Hall started his solo career. He provided vocals for "Don't Look Back" which was used on the TV soap opera Neighbours.

Hall's second band, Airway Lanes, was formed with fellow songwriter-guitarist Chris Hawker, initially as an acoustic duo, in late 2004. Their first live appearances as an electric band were a series of Sunday shows in early 2005 at the Duke of Windsor Hotel, with new members Paul "Spyder" Marret playing drums and backup vocals and Glen "Scrubby" Evans on bass guitar.

In November, the band signed with the record label Dust Devil Music through Stomp. They recorded their self-titled debut extended play, Airway Lanes, in Sing Sing studios in Melbourne with producer and engineer Jimi Maroudas (Pete Murray and the Living End). It was released on 3 April 2006. The rock journalist Jeff Jenkins was impressed with Hall's talent and the "quality pop-rock; catchy songs, with depth" displayed by the EP. A full-length album, In Vino Veritas, followed on 3 May 2008; its lead single, "Don't Let Go", was chosen as iTunes' Single of the Week when it exceeded 11,000 downloads.

In September 2008, Hall returned to Taxiride with Singh and Wild. They toured the Australian east coast sharing some performances with Noiseworks into October and November.

=== Solo ===
Hall's first self-titled EP was released via Bandcamp in September 2024. He released another EP, For the Window Shopper, via Bandcamp in July 2026.

== Death ==
Hall died at his home in Melbourne, Australia aged 48 on 13 November 2026.
