= The Verses (EP) =

The Verses EP

EP by The Verses
- Released: 13 November 2009
- Genres: Alternative, acoustic
- Label: Warner Music

The Verses chronology
The Verses EP (2009)	Seasons (2010)

The Verses is the debut EP by Australian band the Verses. The band consists of Ella Hooper and Jesse Hooper among others, who were previously known as Killing Heidi.

== Track listing ==
Australian EP

1. "Everything at Once"
2. "Waste of Time"
3. "Forever More"
4. "Holidays"

== Singles ==
- "Forever More" was sent to radio on 9 November 2009 as the lead single.

== Charts ==
Chart performance for The Verses
Chart (2009)	Peak position
Australian ARIA Physical Singles Chart	11
Australian ARIA Hitseekers Chart	12

== Release history ==
Country	Release date	Format	Label	Catalogue
Australia	13 November 2009	CD, digital download	Warner Music	5186561262
