= Jesse Hooper =

Australian musician, singer, songwriter and producer

- Born: 11 October 1980 (age 46); Melbourne, Victoria, Australia
- Occupations: Musician, singer, songwriter, producer
- Years active: 1996–present
- Known for: Killing Heidi
- Relatives: Ella Hooper (sister)

Jesse Hooper (born 11 October 1980) is an Australian musician, singer-songwriter, producer and community developer. Hooper founded the band Killing Heidi together with his sister Ella Hooper in 1996. The band received critical acclaim and had hits with singles "Mascara" (no. 1 on Australian charts), "Live Without It" (no. 5) and "Weir" (no. 6). Killing Heidi broke up in 2006 but Jesse and Ella continued to make music together with new band The Verses, formed in 2009.

Today Hooper works as a music teacher, producer and community arts developer in Melbourne.

== Early history ==
Hooper grew up in Violet Town, a small town 175 km north of Melbourne, where his parents worked as English and drama teachers. They encouraged Hooper and his sister to develop their musical skills at an early age. The siblings' breakthrough came with the song "Kettle" that they wrote and performed for a 1996 Triple J competition. Soon afterwards they moved to Melbourne and signed a recording deal with Wah Wah Music's Paul Kosky and Chris Robinson. They released their first single, "Weir" in August 1999.

== Killing Heidi ==
Killing Heidi was founded by Jesse and his sister Ella in 1996 and had great commercial success in Australia and internationally between 1996-2006.

Hooper won four ARIA Awards with the band in 2000, in the categories: "Album of the Year" for Reflector, "Best Group", "Breakthrough Artist – Album" and "Best Rock Group". Hooper also received the APRA 2001 Songwriter of the Year award.

After the band broke up Jesse and Ella went on to form the band The Verses and performed acoustic gigs at smaller venues across Australia.

== Community projects ==
Since 2011 Hooper has worked as a community cultural development artist at The Artful Dodgers Studios, mentoring disadvantaged teens in song-writing and music production.

== Tertiary Education career ==
Hooper taught as the Music Program Leader at the Australian College of the Arts (Collarts) in Melbourne until May 2026, when he left to become Head of Education at Industri, a newer music-focussed college, also in Melbourne.
