= Creepin' Up Slowly =

2002 single by Taxiride

Single by Taxiride

from the album Garage Mahal
- B-side: "World's Away"; "Happy"
- Released: 10 June 2002
- Length: 3:55
- Label: WEA
- Songwriters: Jason Singh; Tim Watson; Tim Wild; Dow Brain; Brad Young
- Producer: Fred Maher

Taxiride singles chronology
"Nothing in This World" (2000)	"Creepin' Up Slowly" (2002)	"How I Got This Way" (2000)

"Creepin' Up Slowly" is the lead single and the third track from Australian rock band Taxiride's second album, Garage Mahal. This single was released on 10 June 2002. The song was recorded at various studios in Los Angeles, and produced by Fred Maher. It was written by the group's Jason Mahendra Singh, Timothy Harcourt Watson and Timothy Andrew Wild, together with the American production and songwriting team Dow S Brain and Bradley K Young. It became Taxiride's second top-10 hit in Australia, reaching No. 6 on the ARIA Singles Chart, and also peaked at No. 19 on the New Zealand Singles Chart. In Australia, it was certified platinum for shipment of 70,000 units by the end of 2002.

== Track listing ==
Australian CD single

1. "Creepin' Up Slowly"
2. "World's Away"
3. "Happy"
4. "Creepin' Up Slowly" (remix)

== Charts ==
=== Weekly charts ===
Chart (2002)	Peak position
Australia (ARIA)	6
New Zealand (Recorded Music NZ)	19

=== Year-end charts ===
Chart (2002)	Position
Australia (ARIA)	33
Australian Artist (ARIA)	4

== Certifications ==
Region	Certification	Certified units/sales
Australia (ARIA)	Platinum	70,000^{^}
^{^} Shipments figures based on certification alone.
