= Can You Feel =

2000 single by Taxiride

Single by Taxiride

from the album Imaginate
- B-side: "The Burden"; "Sydney"
- Released: 31 January 2000
- Studio: Ocean Way (Los Angeles)
- Length: 3:15
- Label: WEA
- Songwriter: Tim Wild
- Producers: Jack Joseph Puig; Peter Dacy

Taxiride singles chronology
"Everywhere You Go" (1999)	"Can You Feel" (2000)	"Nothing in This World" (2000)

"Can You Feel" is a song by Australian rock band Taxiride, written by founding member and co-lead vocalist Tim Wild. It was released as the third single from their debut album, Imaginate, in January 2000. It became the band's third top-40 single in Australia, reaching number 35 on the ARIA Singles Chart.

== Track listing ==
Australian maxi-CD single

1. "Can You Feel" – 3:15
2. "The Burden" – 3:06
3. "Sydney" – 3:02
4. "Can You Feel" (Leigh Brothers remix) – 3:30
5. "Can You Feel" (Dan Chase remix) – 6:24

== Charts ==
Chart (2000)	Peak position
Australia (ARIA)	35
