= Rasa Duende =

- Genre: World Music
- Years active: 2013 -
- Members: Bobby Singh; Adrian McNeil; Damian Wright

Rasa Duende is a 3-piece band who mix together Hindustani and Flamenco music played on a tabala, a sarod and a flamenco guitar. Their album Improvisations was nominated for 2013 ARIA Award for Best World Music Album.

== Members ==
- Bobby Singh - tabla
- Adrian McNeil - sarod
- Damian Wright - flamenco guitar

== Discography ==
=== Albums ===
Title	Details	Peak positions
Title	Details	AUS
Improvisations	Released: June 2013; Label: ABC Music; Formats: CD	—

== Awards and nominations ==
=== ARIA Music Awards ===
The ARIA Music Awards is an annual awards ceremony that recognises excellence, innovation, and achievement across all genres of Australian music. They commenced in 1987.

Year	Nominee / work	Award	Result	Ref.
2013	Improvisations	Best World Music Album	Nominated	
