= Nothing in This World (Taxiride song) =

2000 single by Taxiride

Single by Taxiride

from the album Imaginate
- B-side: "Helena My Dear"
- Released: July 2000
- Studio: Ocean Way (Los Angeles)
- Length: 3:27
- Label: WEA
- Songwriters: Tim Wild; Jason Singh
- Producer: Jack Joseph Puig

Taxiride singles chronology
"Can You Feel" (2000)	"Nothing in This World" (2000)	"Creepin' Up Slowly" (2002)

"Nothing in This World" is a song by Australian rock band Taxiride. It was released as the fourth and final single from their debut album, Imaginate, in July 2000. It gave the band their fourth top-50 single Australia single, reaching number 43 on the ARIA Singles Chart.

== Track listing ==
CD single

1. "Nothing in This World" – 3:27
2. "Helena My Dear" – 4:01
3. "Can You Feel" (live at Radio NRW) – 3:28
4. "Nothing in This World" (Secret Sound mix) – 3:25

== Charts ==
Weekly chart performance for "Nothing in This World"
Chart (2000)	Peak position
Australia (ARIA)	43
