= Carried in Mind =

Studio album by Jeff Lang
- Released: September 2011
- Studio: The Enclave Recording Facility Melbourne
- Label: Jeff Lang, ABC Music
- Producer: Jeff Lang, Mark Opitz

Jeff Lang chronology
Djan Djan (2010)	Carried in Mind (2011)	The Gods of Wheat Street (2014)

Carried in Mind is a studio album by Australian musician Jeff Lang. Carried in Mind was released in Australia in September 2011.

At the ARIA Music Awards of 2012, the album won the ARIA Award for Best Blues and Roots Album.

== Reception ==
Mickey Rennie from Beat Magazine said "This is a great road trip album. You could leave in the morning with your tail between your legs, and arrive at your destination, with clarity of mind and a few problems solved."

== Track listing ==
- All tracks written by Jeff Lang except where noted

Standard edition

1. "Running By the Rock" - 6:32
2. "I'm Barely There" - 5:04
3. "Fisherman's Farewell" - 4:44
4. "Towards Love" - 6:58
5. "Mama, Why You Holding Back Now?" 4:10
6. "You Never Know Who's Listening" (Instrumental) - 1:02
7. "Jack-A-Roe" - 6:37
8. "Frightened Fool" - 3:05
9. "Newbridge" - 8:54
10. "Way Past Midnight" - 3:34

Limited Edition bonus disc

1. "Jack-A-Roe" (solo version on an acoustic lap steel) - 11:27
2. "Mama, Why You Holding Back Now?"(solo version on a Beeton tri-cone with loops) - 4:34
3. "Harry Was a Bad Bugger" (Don Walker) (solo version on an acoustic lap steel) - 6:35
4. "I'm Barely There" (solo version recorded live at Abottsford Convent) - 4:55
5. "Running By the Rock" (solo version on fan powered organ) - 6:26
6. "Way Past Midnight" (solo version on mandolin) - 3:27
7. "Mr Finnen" (Instrumental) - 2:30
8. "Frightened Fool" (solo version on an acoustic guitar and recorded direct on cassette) - 2:58
