= Blue Shaddy =

Australian musical group

- Origin: Kellerberrin, Western Australia, Australia
- Genres: Blues, roots, surf
- Years active: 1999–present
- Label: MGM Distribution
- Members: Neil McClelland; Sandy McClelland; Graham McClelland; Arun Satgunasingam; Kanchana Karunaratna
- Website: blueshaddy.com/default.asp/

Blue Shaddy are an Australian blues and roots band who formed in 1999.

== History ==
Blue Shaddy have independently released four albums and have received national airplay on Triple J. The group has been showcased in the United States through Tin Records. Blue Shaddy was nominated for the Tin Records 2007 New Music compilation.

Singer songwriter and guitarist Jim McClelland, his brother Graham McClelland (harmonica) and Sandra McClelland (bass guitarist and wife of Jim) were born and bred in Western Australia's remote wheat belt, which has had a strong influence on their music, especially songs such as "Don't wanna die here" and "People talk". Having lived in the city of Perth for some 14 years and meeting band members, Malaysian born Arun Satgunasingam (drummer and percussionist) and percussionist Sri Lankan born Kanchana Karunaratna, the band has been exposed to new influences which leads to what Blue Shaddy are today.

== Selected performances ==
- The West Coast Blues and Roots Festival, 2005, 2006, 2007
- The East Coast Blues and Roots Festival, 2007
- Blues on Broadbeach 2007
- The Australian Blues Awards 2007
- The Bridgetown Blues Festival consecutively for 6 years (as of 2007)
- The UBlues blues/roots & soul Festival, Singapore 2002 & 2003
- The Vintage Blues and Roots Festival, Albany (2005, 2006, 2007)
- The Mordialloc Festival Melbourne 2006
- Whale Shark Festival, Exmouth 2006

== Members ==
- Jim McClelland: vocals, guitar (acoustic and lap slide), stomp box
- Sandy McClelland: electric bass guitar
- Graham McClelland: harmonica
- Arun Satgunasingam: drums, percussion
- Kanchana Karunaratna: percussion.

== Discography ==
- Blue Shaddy – Independent (1999)
- Blue Shaddy ... Live. Fine Time... – Independent (2002)
- Walk a Mile – Independent (October 2004)
- Bury My Ghost – Independent (January 2008)
- Across The Road - Independent 2011

== Awards ==
The band enjoyed the Number 1 spot on the Perth Indie Charts in May 2007 with their album Walk A Mile, and were nominated in the Blue Star Awards.
