= How I Got This Way =

2002 single by Taxiride

Single by Taxiride

from the album Garage Mahal
- B-side: "Alright"; "Love the Sun"
- Released: 23 September 2002
- Length: 3:30
- Label: WEA
- Songwriters: Tim Watson; Tim Wild; Jason Singh
- Producers: Fred Maher; Taxiride

Taxiride singles chronology
"Creepin' Up Slowly" (2002)	"How I Got This Way" (2002)	"Afterglow" (2003)

"How I Got This Way" is a song by Australian rock band Taxiride, written by Tim Watson, Tim Wild and Jason Singh. It was released as the second single from their second studio album, Garage Mahal, on 23 September 2002. The single reached number 28 on the Australian ARIA Singles Chart.

== Track listing ==
Australian CD single

1. "How I Got This Way"
2. "Alright"
3. "Love the Sun"
4. "How I Got This Way" (original demo)

== Charts ==
Weekly chart performance for "How I Got This Way"
Chart (2002)	Peak position
Australia (ARIA)	28
