= Mamadou Diabaté =

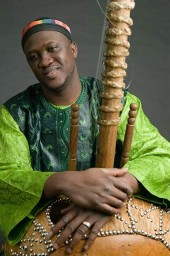
- Cover from Mamadou Diabate's album Heritage

Background information
- Born: Mamadou Diabaté; 1975 (age 50–51)
- Occupation: Musician
- Instrument: Kora
- Years active: 1990s–present

Mamadou Diabaté (born 1975) is a Malian musician known for his work with the kora. He began playing quite early in his life, became known as a musician in the area of Mali in which he lived, and has since moved to the United States, recording several albums.

== Life and career ==
Diabaté was born in Kita, Mali, a town relatively near to Mali's capital of Bamako, known for its artistic and cultural prominence within the Manding community of West Africa. He was born into a family of griots, with his father, Djelimory n'fa Diabaté, also a kora musician and a member of the Instrumental Ensemble of Mali. He began playing the kora, a 21-string instrument used extensively in West Africa, at a very young age, performing at various public events in his country and was becoming somewhat of a regional celebrity by that time as well.

In 1996, he went on to travel with a group of the Instrumental Ensemble of Mali, and eventually settled in the United States. Since his move to the US, Diabaté has performed with several musicians from the country, including jazz players Randy Weston, Guy Davis, and Donald Byrd, as well as with a griot ensemble composed of musicians from Mali and the United States.

His debut album, Tunga (2000), mixed West African music with blues and jazz influences. A review in CMJ New Music Report commented on Diabate's "faster, nimbler style of kora playing". The album featured bassists Cheick Barry and Ira Coleman.

In 2005, Diabaté was nominated for a Grammy Award in the Traditional World Music Album category for Behmanka, but lost to the collaboration between his cousin Toumani Diabaté and Ali Farka Touré. The album was described as a "dazzling duet for one" by The Washington Post, while Philip Van Vleck, reviewing it for Billboard, described it as "a feat of remarkable virtuosity".

His third album, Heritage, was totally instrumental, again showing jazz influences. His group at this time included Djkorya Mory Kante (guitar), Noah Barrett (bass), Baye Kouyati (callabash, talking drum), and Balia Kouyate (balafon). A Billboard review by Philip Van Vleck described it as "a gorgeous album loaded with music that evokes Mali's soul".

His fourth solo album, Douga Mansa, a tribute to his father and grandfather, won the 2010 Grammy for Best Traditional World Music Album. Also in 2010, he was part of the world music trio Djan Djan, which included Bobby Singh, an Australian tabla player, and Jeff Lang, an Australian slide guitarist.

His fifth album, Courage, was recorded in Mali and released in 2011. A review in the Seattle Post-Intelligencer described it as "a truly remarkable disc of music and deserves to be considered equal to anything written or recorded by any composer or symphony orchestra in the rest of the world".

== Discography ==
=== Albums ===
Title	Details	Peak positions
Title	Details	AUS
Tunga	Released: 2000; Label: Alula Records (ALU-1019); Formats: CD	—
Behmanka	Released: 2005; Label:Tradition & Moderne (T&M 029); Formats: CD	—
Heritage	Released: 2006; Label: World Village (468064); Formats: CD	—
Douga Mansa	Released: 2007; Label: Top Shelf (INSTRUMENTAL 001); Formats: CD	—
Djan Djan (with Bobby Singh and Jeff Lang)	Released: 2010; Label: ABC (2723504); Formats: CD, digital	—
Courage	Released: 2011; Label: World Village Music (468108); Formats: CD, digital	—
Griot Classique	Released: July 2014; Label: JRS (001); Formats: CD, digital	—

== Awards and nominations ==
=== ARIA Music Awards ===
The ARIA Music Awards is an annual awards ceremony that recognises excellence, innovation, and achievement across all genres of Australian music. They commenced in 1987.

Year	Nominee / work	Award	Result	Ref.
2010	Djan Djan (with Bobby Singh and Jeff Lang)	Best World Music Album	Won	

== See also ==
- Music of Mali
