= Bob Brozman =

American guitarist and ethnomusicologist (1954-2013)

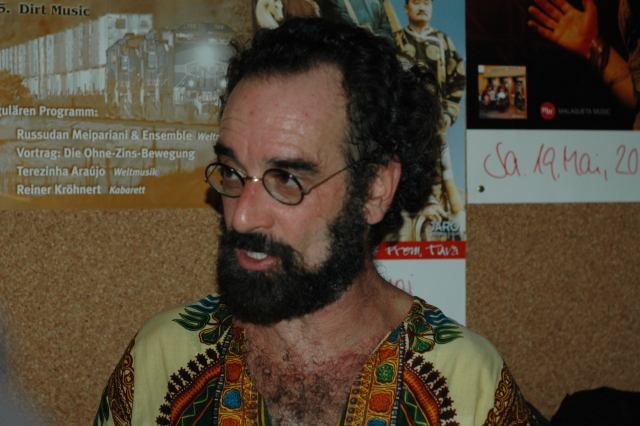
- Bob Brozman, May 2007

Background information
- Born: March 8, 1954; New York City, U.S.
- Died: April 23, 2013 (aged 59) Ben Lomond, California
- Genres: Blues, country blues, folk, gypsy jazz, calypso, ragtime, Hawaiian, Caribbean
- Occupations: Musician, educator, ethnomusicologist
- Instruments: Guitar, slide guitar
- Formerly of: R. Crumb & His Cheap Suit Serenaders
- Website: bobbrozman.com

Bob Brozman (March 8, 1954 – April 23, 2013) was an American guitarist and ethnomusicologist.

== Biography ==
Brozman was born to a Jewish family in Long Island, New York, and began playing the guitar when he was six.

He was an adjunct professor in the Department of Contemporary Music Studies at Macquarie University, in Sydney, Australia.

Brozman played National resonator instruments made in the 1920s and 1930s. He also used Weissenborn-style hollow-neck acoustic steel guitars. Among his National instruments were a baritone version of the tricone guitar, which was designed in conjunction with him in the mid- to late 1990s. This instrument is part of National's range of products. Brozman's book The History and Artistry of National Resonator Instruments, a guide to National Guitars from 1927 to 1941, includes a list serial numbers and production dates.

Brozman was a member of R. Crumb & His Cheap Suit Serenaders from 1978 until his death in 2013.

Brozman committed suicide on April 23, 2013, amid allegations of child molestation. He was survived by a wife and a daughter from a previous marriage.

== Discography ==
- Your Pal (1977)
- Blue Hula Stomp (1981)
- Snapping the Strings (1983)
- Hello Central...Give Me Dr. Jazz (1985)
- Devil's Slide (1988)
- A Truckload of Blues (1992)
- Slide a Go-Go (1994)
- Blues 'Round the Bend (1995)
- Golden Slide (1997)
- Kika Kila Meets Ki Ho'Alu, with Ledward Kaapana (1997)
- Kosmik Blues & Groove (1998)
- The Running Man (1999)
- Four Hands Sweet & Hot, with Cyril Pahinui (1999)
- Tone Poems 3, with David Grisman and Mike Auldridge (2000)
- Get Together with Woody Mann (2000)
- Jin Jin/Firefly, with Takashi Hirayasu (2000)
- Ocean Blues, with Djeli Moussa Diawara (2000)
- Live Now (2001)
- Nankuru Naisa, with Takashi Hirayasu (2001)
- In the Saddle, with Ledward Kaapana (2001)
- Digdig, with René Lacaille (2002)
- Rolling Through This World, with Jeff Lang (2002)
- Mahima, with Debashish Bhattacharya (2003)
- Metric Time (2003)
- Songs of the Volcano (2005)
- Blues Reflex (2006)
- Lumiere (2007)
- Post-Industrial Blues (2007)
- Kani Wai, with George Kahumoku, Jr. (2009)
- Six Days in Down, with Dónal O'Connor and John McSherry (2010)
- Fire in the Mind (2012)

== Bibliography ==
- Douse, Cliff. The Guitarist Book of Guitar Players, Music Maker Books, 1994, ISBN 978-1870951227
- Gregory, Hugh. 1000 Great Guitarists. Rock, Jazz, Country, Funk ..., Balafon Books, 1994.
- Larkin, Colin. The Encyclopedia of Popular Music, Third edition, Macmillan, 1998, ISBN 9780195313734
