= Andrew Winton =

Australian musician (born 1972)

- Born: February 1972 (age 54)
- Origin: Perth, Western Australia, Australia
- Genres: Blues; Roots; Bluegrass; Gospel; Alternative
- Occupations: Musician, songwriter, high school chaplain
- Instruments: Vocals guitar Wintonbeast; Dobro; Lapsteel; Stomp box
- Label: Independent
- Formerly of: Tin Dog
- Website: Official Site

Andrew Winton (born February 1972, Perth) is an independent and solo Australian musician who combines acoustic guitar, lap slide, dobro and seven-string lap guitar/bass (the Wintonbeast), with hollers and stomp.

Winton's sound has been likened to a cross between Ben Harper, Sting, Kelly-Joe Phelps and Harry Manx.

Winton currently lives in Perth with Karen (his wife, manager and percussionist/vocalist) and their three children, Rory Winton, Violet Winton and Elsie Winton.

Winton is a brother of both the author Tim Winton and Sharyn O'Neill, who is head of the Western Australian public service (as Public Sector Commissioner) and was previously director of the Education Department.

Winton also works part-time as a Counsellor/Psychotherapist at Notre Dame Fremantle in Perth.

== Musical career ==
Winton grew up listening to Deep Purple, Kiss, Frank Zappa and Johnny Cash. He started his musical life as a drummer but in his later teenager years changed to electric guitar, playing in bands and completing a degree in jazz at the Conservatorium of Music in Perth. He played guitar for a few years in Perth band Hodad City with Adam Bruno who was to later become Adam Brand (multi CMA Golden Guitar Award winner) and then went on to have local success in 3Ph, a quirky funk-rock band with bandmates Stephen Kelly (bass/vox) and Paul Novosel (drums/vox) which won Western Australia's The Next Big Thing competition in 1997. The band however disbanded a short time later when Novosel (1999) and Kelly (2001) moved to the east coast to do session work. After being invited to play drums with Perth old-timey blues band Tin Dog, Winton was exposed further to the world of blues, roots and folk music. After seeing UK musician Rory McLeod perform in 2002, he was inspired to focus on solo songwriting road and began his transition to dobro and other lap style guitars, which are now his passion. He recorded his first solo album in 2003 after only eight months of dobro playing experience.

== Awards ==
Winton toured Australia for three months, playing numerous festivals, events and radio broadcasts, and took out first place in the folk/acoustic category of the Australian Songwriters Association awards for his song "Lucky Boy" (as well as the award for best live performance at the awards night).

Winton was a feature artist on ABC Radio National's Music Deli program and placed in the top 10 in the instrumental category of the MusicOz awards.

In 2007, Winton was nominated for a WAMi West Australian Music Industry Awards for best blues/roots artist, again in 2008 for best guitarist, In 2009 he received two nominations, for best guitarist and best blues and roots act. His third album, The Decompression Chamber, received critical acclaim.

== Live performances ==
Winton's partner, Karen, sometimes accompanies him on stage on vocals and percussion, adding harmonies and layers to his music. Since about March 2007, he has been regularly accompanied by flamboyant percussionist and longtime friend Paul Novosel on percussion and vox. This line-up is often billed as the Andrew Winton Duo.

Winton has performed at many festivals including the National Folk Festival, the Australian Blues Music Festival, Fairbridge Festival, the Woodford Folk Festival, the Nannup Music Festival, A Day on the Green Tamworth Country Music Festival, and the South by Southwest Festival. For the first four months of 2009, Winton and Novosel toured most of Australia to promote Winton's fourth studio release Surface Tension. They can also be seen performing regularly around Perth and the southwest region. The duo are credited for inaugurating the Blues on the Verandah Sunday session at the Settler's Tavern in Margaret River and have since performed there regularly with their semi-acoustic performances.

== Albums ==
GloryBox Mechanics – album released November 2015

Happy – album released December 2011

Surface Tension – album released January 2009

The Decompression Chamber – album released February 2006

Can't Slow Down – mostly live EP (2005) (out of print)

Barrel O Monkeys – album (2004)

Whalebone Surf Classic – DVD soundtrack (2004)

== Singles ==
Love Paints A Picture – includes live DVD footage of the Andrew Winton Duo
