= Oh Yeah (Taxiride song) =

Single by Taxiride

from the album Axiomatic
- B-side: "Over My Head"
- Released: 8 August 2005
- Length: 3:46 (radio edit)
- Label: Mandarin Music
- Songwriter(s): Tim Wild
- Producer(s): Taxiride; David Carr

Taxiride singles chronology
"Afterglow" (2003)	"Oh Yeah" (2005)	"You Gotta Help Me" (2005)

"Oh Yeah" is a song by Australian rock band Taxiride, written by founding member and co-lead vocalist Tim Wild. It was released as the first single from their third studio album, Axiomatic, in August 2005. It was their first independent release since leaving Warner Music Group in 2004. The track reached No. 40 in Australia.

== Track listing ==
Maxi-CD single

1. "Oh Yeah" – 4:11
2. "Over My Head" – 5:25
3. "Oh Yeah" (Super★ 7-inch remix) – 4:02
4. "Oh Yeah" (Super★ 12-inch remix) – 6:44
5. "Oh Yeah" (radio edit) – 3:46

== Charts ==
Weekly chart performance for "Oh Yeah"
Chart (2005)	Peak position
Australia (ARIA)	40
