= Seasons (The Verses album) =

Studio album by The Verses
- Released: 13 August 2010
- Recorded: 2009–2010
- Genres: Alternative, acoustic
- Label: Warner Music

The Verses chronology
The Verses EP (2009)	Seasons (2010)

Seasons is the debut album from Australian band the Verses. Its original release date was set for 6 August 2010, but was delayed a week. The album was recorded in Los Angeles with producer Mitchell Froom.

== Track listing ==
1. "Still Come Around"
2. "Want Everything"
3. "Settle Down"
4. "Never Knew"
5. "Teeth"
6. "Let You (W)in"
7. "Running Away"
8. "Lonely Moon"
9. "Midnight"
10. "The Winter"
11. "Waste of Time"

=== Bonus tracks ===
- "Different Drum" (exclusive bonus from iTunes Australia)
- "Down So Long" (exclusive pre-order bonus track from JB Hi-Fi)

== Singles ==
- "Want Everything" was the lead single from the album, released to radio on 5 July 2010, The single was digitally released on 1 July. A music video for the song was released via the bands YouTube channel on 24 August 2010.
- "Running Away" was released as the second single from the album. Its music video was featured heavily on video hits. Like previous single Want Everything, it failed to chart.

== Charts ==
Chart (2010)	Peak position
Australian Albums (ARIA)	13

== Release history ==
Country	Release date	Format	Label	Catalogue
Australia	13 August 2010	CD, digital download	Warner Music	5186597462
