= Everywhere You Go =

1999 single by Taxiride

Single by Taxiride

from the album Imaginate
- B-side: "A Stone in the Ocean"
- Released: 6 September 1999
- Studio: Ocean Way (Los Angeles)
- Length: 3:35
- Label: WEA
- Songwriters: Tim Watson, Tim Wild
- Producer: Jack Joseph Puig

Taxiride singles chronology
"Get Set" (1999)	"Everywhere You Go" (1999)	"Can You Feel" (2000)

"Everywhere You Go" is Australian rock band Taxiride's second single, written by founding members and co-lead singers Tim Wild and Tim Watson. It was released as the band's second single from their 1999 debut album, Imaginate, in September 1999, becoming the band's second top-20 single in their home country. It was certified gold by the Australian Recording Industry Association (ARIA).

== Track listings ==
Australian CD single

1. "Everywhere You Go" – 3:35
2. "Get Set" (original demo version) – 3:00

European CD single

1. "Everywhere You Go" (acoustic intro) – 3:33
2. "A Stone in the Ocean" – 2:50

== Charts ==
=== Weekly charts ===
Chart (1999–2000)	Peak position
Australia (ARIA)	15
Germany (GfK)	81
New Zealand (Recorded Music NZ)	30

=== Year-end charts ===
Chart (1999)	Position
Australia (ARIA)	68

== Certifications ==
Region	Certification	Certified units/sales
Australia (ARIA)	Gold	35,000^{^}
^{^} Shipments figures based on certification alone.

== Release history ==
Region	Date	Format(s)	Label(s)	Ref.
United States	3 August 1999	Contemporary hit radio	Sire	
Australia	6 September 1999	CD	WEA	
United Kingdom	10 April 2000	CD	WEA	
