= Jeff Lang =

Australian musician

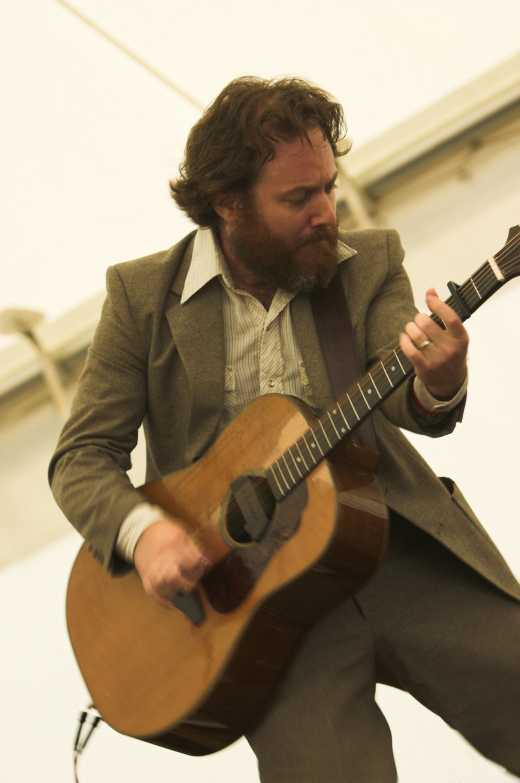
- Lang at Harvest Festival Jan 2007

Background information
- Born: Jeffrey Lang; 8 November 1969 (age 57); Geelong, Victoria, Australia
- Genres: Folk, blues, rock and roll
- Occupations: singer, songwriter, music producer
- Instruments: Vocals, guitar, banjo, mandolin
- Years active: 1986–present
- Label: ABC Music
- Website: www.jefflang.com.au

Jeff Lang (born 9 November 1969) is an Australian guitarist, songwriter, vocalist and music producer. who plays guitar, banjo, mandolin, cümbüş and drums.

He is a three-time ARIA Award winner, for his albums Rolling Through This World (2002), Djan Djan (2010) and Carried in Mind (2012). Lang has performed at numerous international festivals.

== Career ==
=== 1969–1993: early years and the Jeff Lang Band ===
Jeff Lang became interested in music at age eight, when he started playing the clarinet. His early influences were AC/DC, Bob Dylan, Leo Kottke, Ry Cooder, Roy Buchanan and Neil Young. As a teen, Lang began to learn guitar and commenced performing as a blues guitarist at 17, supporting artists like Albert Collins, Rory Gallagher and Trudy Lynn. His musical vocabulary expanded to include traditional Celtic and folk elements as he began recording his material in 1990. Along with gigs in local blues bands, Lang formed the Jeff Lang Band as a showcase for his songwriting skills. The band disbanded in 1993 and he concentrated on playing solo shows. Lang said the band's disbandment was a "purely instinctive decision" and one he has never looked back from.

=== 1994–2003: career beginnings ===
In 1994, Lang self-released his debut studio album titled, Ravenswood, which was followed by a live recording titled Disturbed Folk in 1995.

In 1996, Lang released Native Dog Creek on Black Market Music. The album was named Best Australian Blues Album in Rhythms Magazine's readers' poll.

In 1998, Lang released his third studio album titled, Cedar Grove, which was nominated for Best Blues and Roots Album at the ARIA Music Awards of 1999. In 1999, Lang released a limited edition album titled The Silverbacks with Hat Fitz.

In 2001, Lang released Everything Is Still with Angus Diggs. The album was again nominated for Best Blues and Roots Album at the ARIA Music Awards of 2001. In 2002, Lang joined Bob Brozman and collaborated again with Diggs on the album Rolling Through This World. At the ARIA Music Awards of 2002, the album won the ARIA Award for Best Blues and Roots Album, Lang's first win.

=== 2004–2018: ARIA and APRA Awards ===
In July 2004, Lang released his seventh studio album, Whatever Makes You Happy, his first on ABC Music. The album became his first album to reach the ARIA top 100, peaking at number 91.

In 2005, Lang released You Have to Dig Deep to Bury Daddy on ABC Classics. Lang said, "There are a couple of instrumental things on this album that were recorded some years ago. They were in the background for possible inclusion on other albums. Specifically, tracks like 'And All the Snow Melted' and 'I'm Not the One Sweating Like They Just Told Me a Lie'.. had a darker mood. They didn't seem to fit on the last record. So what I did this time around was I put them on the table first. I wanted to use these instrumental pieces. So I started with them and recorded stuff with that in mind."

In April 2005, Lang collaborated with Chris Whitley and went on to release Dislocation Blues in August 2006. The album peaked at number 64 on the ARIA Charts. Half Seas Over was released in 2008 and Chimeradour in 2009. All three albums were released on ABC Roots and all were nominated for ARIA Awards. Chris Whitley died in November 2005.

In 2009, Lang collaborated with Mamadou Diabate and Bobby Singh on the album Djan Djan. The album was released in 2010. At the ARIA Music Awards of 2010, the album won Best World Music Album.

In 2011, Lang released Carried in Mind.

In 2012, Lang was presented with the National Film and Sound Archive of Australia's National Folk Recording Award. Also in 2012, Lang added vocals to Maru Tarang's album Blue City.

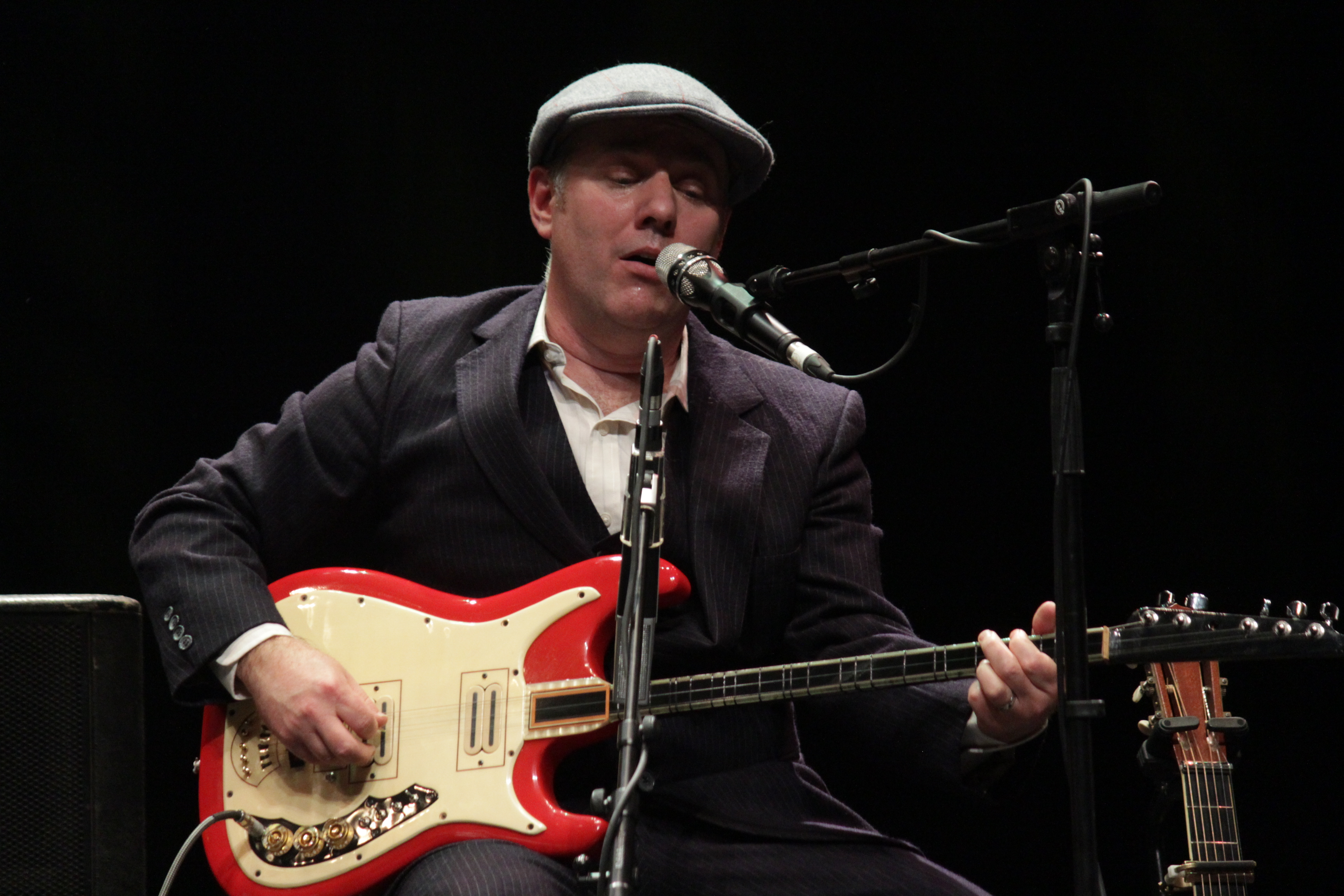
Lang, 2014

In May 2014, Lang released the soundtrack to the TV series The Gods of Wheat Street. This won Lang his first APRA Award at the APRA Music Awards of 2014, where he won Best Television Theme.

=== 2019–present: Some Memories Never Die ===
In 2019, Lang released Next They Come for You, on LP. The album is an instrumental recording featuring Lang and his regular drummer Danny McKenna playing music they wrote together without restrictions, constraints.

In 2020, Lang published his book Some Memories Never Die. Lang said "For Some Memories Never Die I wanted to connect recollections from the life I've lived to some of the songs I've made up along the way. I wasn't looking to write a linear autobiography, with my life's journey laid out in order of occurrence, more a series of stand-alone vignettes was what I had in mind. I wasn't sure exactly how a good many of these tales could be connected to the songs I intended to include, as I don't generally write autobiographical songs. But as I wrote down the varied reminiscences, certain stories seemed to go together and themes became apparent to me. Gradually it all seemed to find its form, and Some Memories Never Die is the result."

Over the lockdowns of 2020 and 2021 Lang and Alison Ferrier formed the band High Ace and released Snow Cap Menace on Furry Records in 2022.

== Discography ==
=== Studio albums ===
Title	Details	Peak chart positions
Title	Details	AUS
Ravenswood	Released: 1994; Label: Jeff Lang (JL941 CD); Format: CD	—
Native Dog Creek	Released: 1996; Label: Black Market Music (BMM 206.2); Format: CD	—
Cedar Grove	Released: 1998; Label: Jeff Lang (JL9801CD); Format: CD	—
The Silverbacks (credited to Jeff Lang & Hat Fitz are The Silverbacks)	Released: 1999; Label: Jeff Lang (JL9801CD); Format: CD (Limited to 500 copies)	—
Everything Is Still (featuring Angus Diggs)	Released: 2001; Label: Jeff Lang (JLCD2001); Format: CD	—
Rolling Through This World (with Bob Brozman and Angus Diggs)	Released: 2002; Label: Jeff Lang (JLCD2002); Format: CD	—
Whatever Makes You Happy	Released: July 2004; Label: Jeff Lang, ABC Classics (13930 /13932); Format: CD, digital download	91
You Have to Dig Deep to Bury Daddy	Released: 2005; Label: Jeff Lang, ABC Classics / Warner (14500); Format: CD, digital download	—
Dislocation Blues (with Chris Whitley)	Released: August 2006; Label: Jeff Lang, ABC Roots (11777790); Format: CD, digital download	64
Half Seas Over	Released: August 2008; Label: Jeff Lang, ABC Roots (1777791); Format: CD, digital download	—
The Blessed South (Songs by Melbourne Songwriters)	Released: 2008; Label: Format: CD, digital download	—
Chimeradour	Released: 2009; Label: ABC Roots (2717429); Format: CD, digital download	—
Djan Djan (with Mamadou Diabate & Bobby Singh)	Released: March 2010; Label: ABC Roots / Universal (2723504); Format: CD, digital download	—
Carried in Mind	Released: September 2011; Label: Jeff Lang, ABC Music (2780478); Format: CD, 2xCD, digital download	—
I Live in My Head a Lot These Days	Released: 16 May 2014; Label: Jeff Lang, ABC Music (3765640); Format: CD, digital download	—
Alone in Bad Company	Released: February 2017; Label: Jeff Lang, ABC Music (5730477); Format: CD, digital download, streaming	—
Next They Come for You (with Danny McKenna)	Released: 2019; Label: Fury Records; Format: LP	—

=== Soundtracks ===
List of live albums with selected details
Title	album details
The Gods of Wheat Street	Released: 12 May 2014; Label: The Gods of Wheat Street, ABC Music; Formats: DD

=== Live albums ===
List of live albums with selected details
Title	album details
Disturbed Folk	Released: 1995; Label: Jeff Lang (JL951CD); Formats: CD; Recorded live at Criterion Hotel and Stooges Restaurant in Queensland in March 1995.
Live at the Vineyard (with Chris Finnen)	Released: 1996; Label: Crossing Record Company; Formats: CD; Recorded live at Burge Winery in April 1996
A Crowd In Every Face – Live '96 – '97	Released: 1997; Label: Jeff Lang; Formats: CD; Recorded live in various locations across 1996 and 1997.
Real Scars	Released: 1998; Label: Jeff Lang; Formats: CD; Bonus Disc with first 1,000 copies of Cedar Grove album.; Recorded live at The Esplanade, St. Kilda on 6 February 1998 and St. Andrews Hotel, Victoria on 18 April 1998.
Disturbed Folk Vol. 2	Released: 1999; Label: Jeff Lang (JLCD 990); Formats: CD; Recorded live in Melbourne, Sydney and Fremantle.
No Point Slowing Down (Live in the USA)	Released: 2003; Label: Redbird Records (RB1005); Formats: CD; Recorded live in New York, New Hampshire and Pennsylvania.
Engines Moan	Released: 2009 (Japanese only release); Label: Formats: CD; Recorded live at Northcote Social Club, Victoria.

=== Compilation albums ===
List of compilations with selected details
Title	album details
Prepare Me Well: A Jeff Lang Anthology 1994–2006	Released: 2006; Label: ABC Music (5144214252); Formats: CD, CD+DVD
Rarities 1994 – 2012	Released: 2016; Label: Red Hair Records (8105716201501); Formats: LP; Compilation of live, studio outtakes, demos and alternate versions.

== Awards and nominations ==
=== AIR Awards ===
The Australian Independent Record Awards (commonly known informally as AIR Awards) is an annual awards night to recognise, promote and celebrate the success of Australia's Independent Music sector. They commenced in 2006

Year	Nominee / work	Award	Result
2010	Chimeradour	Best Independent Blues and Roots Album	Nominated

=== APRA Awards ===
The APRA Awards have been presented annually since 1982 by the Australasian Performing Right Association (APRA), "honouring composers and songwriters". Lang has been nominated for one award.

Year	Nominee / work	Award	Result
2014	"The Gods of Wheat Street"	Best Television Theme	Nominated

=== ARIA Music Awards ===
The ARIA Music Awards is an annual awards ceremony that recognises excellence, innovation, and achievement across all genres of Australian music. Lang has won 3 awards from 10 nominations.

Year	Nominee / work	Award	Result
1999	Cedar Grove	Best Blues and Roots Album	Nominated
2001	Everything Is Still (with Angus Diggs)	Best Blues and Roots Album	Nominated
2002	Rolling Through This World (with Bob Brozman)	Best Blues and Roots Album	Won
2004	Whatever Makes You Happy	Best Blues and Roots Album	Nominated
2005	You Have to Dig Deep to Bury Daddy	Best Blues and Roots Album	Nominated
2007	Dislocation Blues (with Chris Whitley)	Best Blues and Roots Album	Nominated
2008	Half Seas Over	Best Blues and Roots Album	Nominated
2010	Djan Djan (with Mamadou Diabate and Bobby Singh)	Best World Music Album	Won
2010	Chimeradour	Best Blues and Roots Album	Nominated
2012	Carried in Mind	Best Blues and Roots Album	Won

== Equipment ==
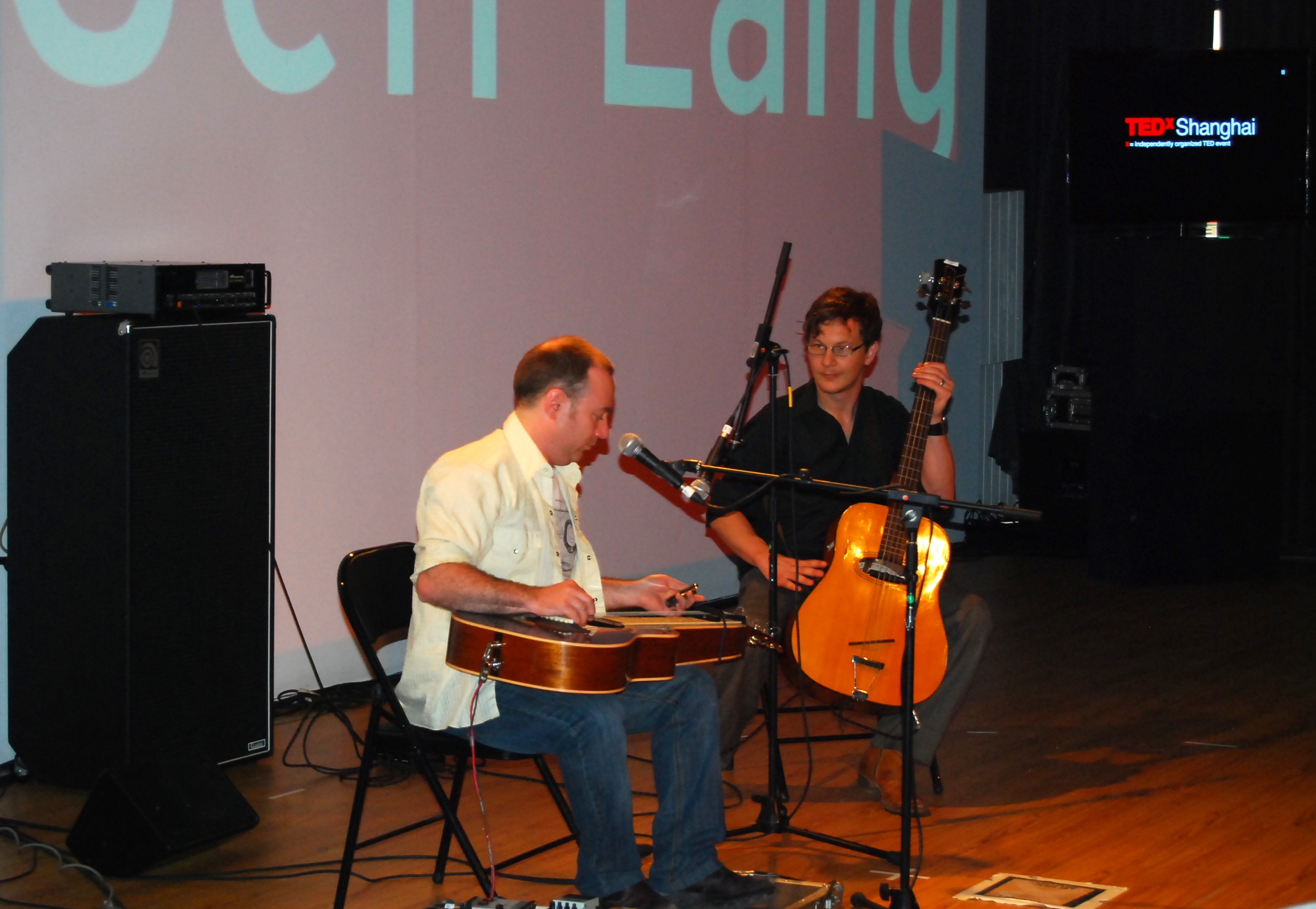

Lang primarily plays acoustic guitars, although he has an unorthodox way of amplifying them, running a combination of a built-in microphone and a Sunrise magnetic pick-up together for his clean acoustic sound, while also running the output of the Sunrise pick-up through various effects through an electric guitar amplifier allowing him to obtain both acoustic and distorted electric guitar tones from the same guitar. This approach has been hugely influential in the Australian scene, particularly after the well-known guitarist John Butler was inspired by Lang's playing and sound to pursue a very similar setup.
