= René Lacaille =

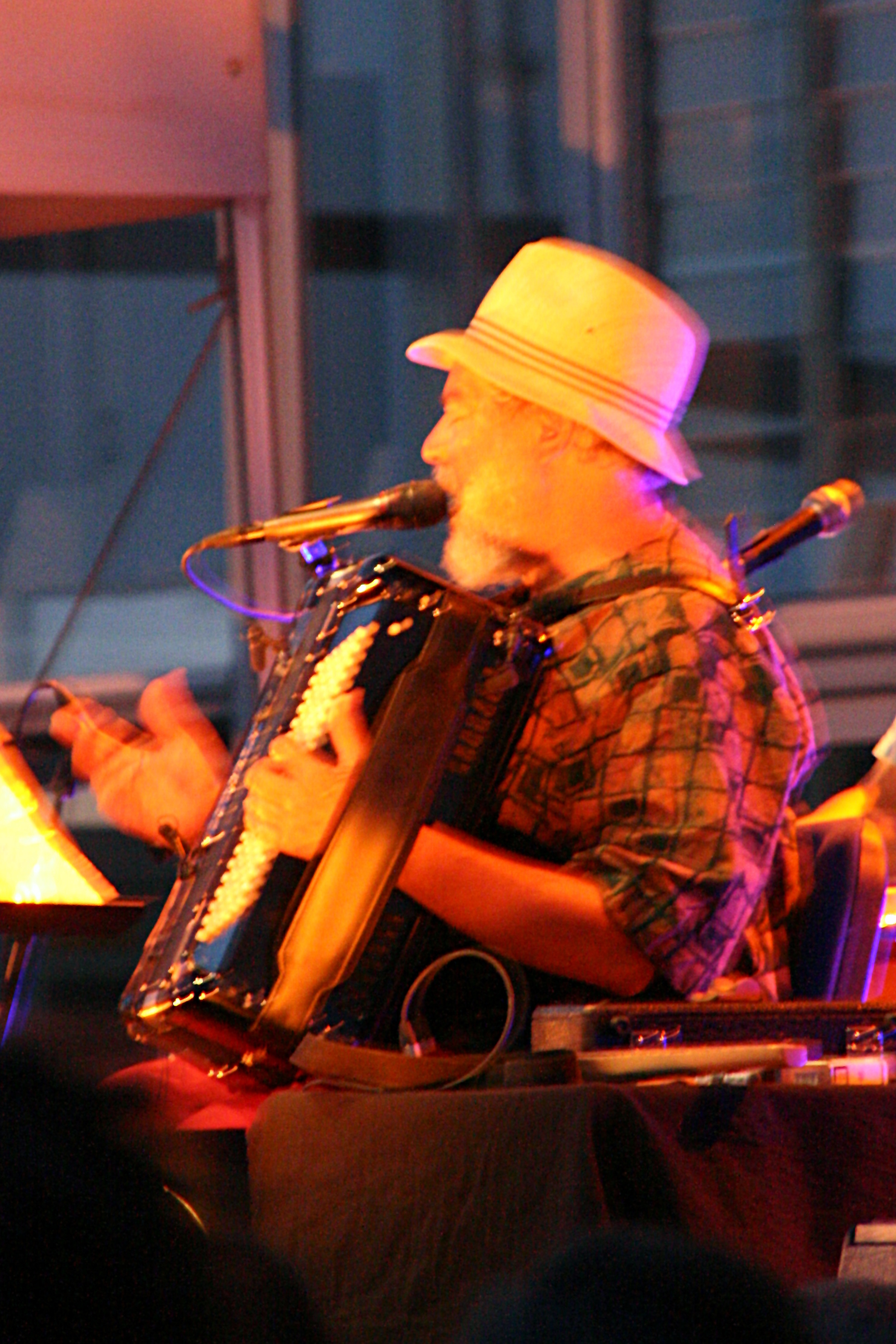

Background information
- Born: 1946 (age 79–80)
- Origin: Réunion
- Occupation: Accordionist

René Lacaille is a Réunionnais accordionist, currently based in France. He was born into a musical family and taught himself to play the accordion at age 7 while on tour with his father. He has been described as a neo-traditionalist and plays in the séga style among others.

== Discography ==
- Mycose Créole (1992)
- Aster (1996)
- Patanpo (1999)
- Digdig (2002)
- Mapou (2004)
- Cordéon Kaméléon (2009)
- Poksina (2011)
- Fanfaroné (2014)
- Gatir (2015)
