= Axiomatic (album) =

Studio album by Taxiride
- Released: 5 September 2005
- Genre: Rock
- Length: 44:24

Taxiride chronology
Garage Mahal (2002)	Axiomatic (2005)	Electrophobia (2006)

Singles from Axiomatic
- 1. "Oh Yeah" Released: August 2005; 2. "You Gotta Help Me" Released: December 2005; 3. "What Can I Say" Released: March 2006

Axiomatic is the third studio album by Australian rock band Taxiride, released in September 2005. Three singles were taken from this album, "Oh Yeah", "You Gotta Help Me" and "What Can I Say".

Taxiride made it clear in interviews leading up to the release of this album that they would be breaking away from the radio-friendly pop-rock sound of their two previous albums, and instead they would adopt a more hard-rock feel.

The album peaked at No. 91 in Australia in September 2005. Singer-songwriter Chris Bailey, from the Australian punk rock band The Saints, co-wrote the song "Everything + Nothing", also featured on their live album Electrophobia. Axiomatic was released in Australia, Japan, India and South East Asia.

== Track listing ==
1. "Finally Falling" – 4:58
2. "Oh Yeah" – 4:11
3. "Hold On" – 3:26
4. "You Gotta Help Me" – 3:07
5. "Everything + Nothing" – 4:03
6. "The Fatal and the Fragile" – 3:37
7. "Stone" – 4:06
8. "The Nation" – 3:16
9. "San Francisco" – 4:21
10. "What Can I Say" – 4:40
11. "Tripper Red" – 4:39
12. "Razor" – 2:21 (Japanese bonus track)
13. "Over My Head" – 5:23 (Japanese bonus track)

== Charts ==
Chart performance for Axiomatic
Chart (2005)	Peak position
Australian Albums (ARIA)	91
