= Custom Kings =

Australian folk-pop band

- Origin: Melbourne, Victoria, Australia
- Genre: Folk-pop
- Years active: 2002–present
- Members: Nick Vorrath; Jarrad Brown; Craig Shanahan; Luke Gale
- Past members: Eugene Wheelahan; Tom Spender; Dave Ward

Custom Kings is an Australian folk-pop band formed in Melbourne, Victoria. started in 2002 as solo project for Nick Vorrath . After three critically acclaimed EPs they released their debut album, At Sea in 2007 and it was followed up with a second, Great Escape, in 2010. The band has toured Australia and they have been on national rotation on Triple J.

== Discography ==
=== Albums ===
List of albums, with Australian chart positions
Title	Album details	Peak chart positions
Title	Album details	AUS
At Sea	Released: October 2007; Format: CD, Digital; Label: Liberation Music (LIBCD9253.2)	-
Great Escape	Released: October 2010; Format: CD, Digital; Label: Liberation Music (LMCD0101)	-

=== Extended Plays ===
List of EP, with Australian chart positions
Title	EP details	Peak chart positions
Title	EP details	AUS
Peace	Released: 2004; Format: CD, Digital; Label: Liberation Music (LIBEP6128.2)	-
Where Do They Go?	Released: 2004; Format: CD, Digital; Label: Liberation Music (LIBEP6138.2)	-
Merchant Songs	Released: July 2006; Format: CD, Digital; Label: Liberation Music (LIBEP8206.2)	72
