= The Verses =

Australian band

Background information
- Origin: Violet Town, Victoria, Australia
- Genres: Folk
- Years active: 2009–present
- Labels: Warner
- Members: Ella Hooper; Jesse Hooper; Brett Langsford; Jorge Rodrigues; Madeleine Davey

The Verses are an Australian band that features the brother and sister combination of Ella and Jesse Hooper, the founding members of popular Australian rock band Killing Heidi. Their debut album Seasons was released on Friday, 13 August 2010.

== History ==
=== 1999–2006 ===
See Killing Heidi#History

Ella and Jesse Hooper, born in Violet Town, Victoria, Australia, have been playing music together since they were young. In August 1999, they rose to fame with previous band Killing Heidi, which spawned three top 10 albums, and eight singles. In 2006, after rumours of the band splitting, they posted a blog on their MySpace blog stating they were taking a break. Throughout 2006, Ella and Jesse played several gigs as a duo under the name of Killing Heidi. They played a mix of old Killing Heidi material, as well as some new, unrecorded tracks.

=== 2009–2010 ===
On 13 November 2009, the band's first EP, The Verses was released. It peaked at #11 on the Australian ARIA Physical Singles Chart, but failed to impact the top 100 overall singles. Its single, "Forever More", received little airplay. On their official website, the band posted news about their upcoming album, Seasons, to be released on 13 August 2010. It will feature new single "Want Everything", which combines the verses of previous single "Forever More" with the chorus of "Everything at Once", also from the band's debut EP. The album debuted at #13 on the Australian albums chart, and fell to #28 the following week. The 2nd single from the album is "Running Away".

== Current members ==
- Ella Hooper – vocals
- Jesse Hooper – guitar
- Brett Langsford – guitar
- Jorge Rodrigues – double bass, bass guitar
- Madeleine Davey – keyboard, piano

== Discography ==
=== Studio albums ===
Studio album, with selected details and chart position
Title	Details	Chart positions
Title	Details	AUS
Seasons	Released: 13 August 2010; Label: Warner Music	13

=== Extended plays ===
Extended play with selected details and chart position
Title	Details	Chart positions
Title	Details	AUS Phy.
The Verses	Released: 13 November 2009; Label: Warner Music	11
