= Garage Mahal =

Studio album by Taxiride
- Released: 10 July 2002
- Studios: Conway Studios, Los Angeles; SER, Venice Beach; The Hook, North Hollywood; Secret Sound Studios, Melbourne
- Genre: Rock
- Length: 47:08
- Labels: Warner; Sire
- Producers: Fred Maher; Taxiride

Taxiride chronology
Imaginate (1999)	Garage Mahal (2002)	Axiomatic (2005)

Singles from Garage Mahal
- 1. "Creepin' Up Slowly" Released: 10 June 2002; 2. "How I Got This Way" Released: 22 September 2002; 3. "Afterglow" Released: February 2003

Garage Mahal is the second studio album by Australian rock band Taxiride, released in July 2002 It contained Taxiride's most successful song, "Creepin' Up Slowly", which reached No. 6 in Australia. Garage Mahal was certified platinum in Australia.

== Track listing ==
1. "Afterglow" – 4:07
2. "How I Got This Way" – 3:30
3. "Creepin' Up Slowly" – 3:57
4. "Forest for the Trees" – 3:47
5. "Afraid to Fly" – 3:36
6. "Saffron" – 3:15
7. "This Time" – 3:23
8. "Enemy" – 3:44
9. "Skin" – 3:21
10. "Happiness Without You" – 4:11
11. "Stronger" – 3:51
12. "Wait" – 4:35
13. "Madrigal" – 1:48

=== Japanese bonus tracks ===
14. "World's Away" – 2:58
15. "Happy" – 2:43

== Charts ==
=== Weekly charts ===
Chart (2002)	Peak position
Australian Albums (ARIA)	5
New Zealand Albums (RMNZ)	30

=== Year-end charts ===
Chart (2002)	Position
Australian Albums (ARIA)	52
Australian Artist Album Chart (ARIA)	11

== Certification ==
Region	Certification	Certified units/sales
Australia (ARIA)	Platinum	70,000^{^}
^{^} Shipments figures based on certification alone.

== Release history ==
Country	Date	Format	Label	Catalogue
Japan	10 July 2002	CD	WEA Records	WPCR-11240
Australia	5 August 2002	CD	WEA Australia	0927452232
Australia	November 2022	LP	Warner Music Australia	5419731677
