= Get Set =

1999 single by Taxiride

Single by Taxiride

from the album Imaginate
- B-side: "Voodoo Doll Sin"; "Splash"
- Released: May 1999
- Studio: Ocean Way (Los Angeles)
- Length: 3:18
- Label: WEA
- Songwriter: Tim Wild
- Producer: Jack Joseph Puig

Taxiride singles chronology
"Get Set" (1999)	"Everywhere You Go" (1999)

"Get Set" is a song by Australian band Taxiride, written by founding member and co-lead vocalist Tim Wild. The song was recorded at Ocean Way Studios, Los Angeles, and produced by Jack Joseph Puig. Released in May 1999 as the band's debut single, it peaked within the top 10 in Australia and also reached number 41 in New Zealand. At the ARIA Music Awards of 1999, the song was nominated for two awards: 'Breakthrough Artist – Single' and 'Best Pop Release', winning the former.

"Get Set" was used in the soundtrack of the 1999 film Election. In the film, the character Tammy is in her room listening to the song. A music video was also released, based on the film; it featured several scenes from the film, along with Taxiride playing in a studio. In 2002, this song was used for TV advertisement for Village Cinemas in Australia. In 2022 the song was used in an advertisement to visit Melbourne.

== Track listing ==
Australian CD single

1. "Get Set" – 3:14
2. "Voodoo Doll Sin" – 3:36
3. "Splash" – 3:20

== Charts ==
=== Weekly charts ===
Chart (1999)	Peak position
Australia (ARIA)	8
New Zealand (Recorded Music NZ)	41

=== Year-end charts ===
Chart (1999)	Position
Australia (ARIA)	97
