= Imaginate (Taxiride album) =

Studio album by Taxiride
- Released: 18 October 1999
- Studio: Ocean Way Recording, Los Angeles and Secret Sound Studios, Melbourne
- Genre: Rock
- Length: 39:53
- Label: Warner/Sire
- Producer: Jack Joseph Puig

Taxiride chronology
Imaginate (1999)	Garage Mahal (2002)

Singles from Imaginate
- 1. "Get Set" Released: May 1999; 2. "Everywhere You Go" Released: September 1999; 3. "Can You Feel" Released: February 2000; 4. "Nothing in This World" Released: July 2000

Alternative cover
- European edition

Imaginate is the debut album by Australian rock band Taxiride. It was recorded in Ocean Way Studios in Los Angeles and Secret Sound Studios, Melbourne. It was produced by Jack Joseph Puig. Imaginate was released in October 1999 and reached number one on the ARIA Albums Chart. It was certified double platinum. Its first two singles, "Get Set" and "Everywhere You Go", both peaked in the top 15 on the related ARIA Singles Chart. At the ARIA Music Awards of 1999 Taxiride won Breakthrough Artist – Single for "Get Set". In the following year Imaginate was nominated for the related category, Breakthrough Artist – Album.

== Track listing ==
1. "Can You Feel" – 3:17
2. "Get Set" – 3:13
3. "Everywhere You Go" – 3:37
4. "72 Hour Daze" – 4:50
5. "Rocketship" – 3:40
6. "Let Me Die Young" – 4:26
7. "Rachael" – 3:00
8. "Ice Cream" – 3:29
9. "Let's Spend the Night" – 2:45
10. "Nothing in This World" – 3:27
11. "Counting Down the Days" – 2:41
12. "Back Again" – 1:28

=== Australian/European/Taiwanese releases ===
13. "Helplessly Hoping" (from the film A Walk on the Moon)

=== Japanese release ===
13. "Helplessly Hoping" (from the film A Walk on the Moon)
14. "Get Set" (Original Demo Version)

== Chart positions ==
=== Weekly charts ===
weekly chart position Imaginate
Chart (1999–2000)	Peak position
Australian Albums (ARIA)	1
German Albums (Offizielle Top 100)	15

=== Year-end charts ===
Chart (1999)	Position
Australia Albums Chart (ARIA)	37
Australian Artist Album Chart (ARIA)	7
Chart (2000)	Position
Australia Albums Chart (ARIA)	87
Australian Artist Album Chart (ARIA)	26

== Certification ==
Region	Certification	Certified units/sales
Australia (ARIA)	2× Platinum	140,000^{^}
^{^} Shipments figures based on certification alone.

== Release history ==
List of release dates, showing region
Region	Date	Label	Catalogue
Australia	October 1999	WEA Australia	3984277222
United States	1999	Warner Music	31056-2
Japan	February 2000	WEA Records	WPCR-10643
Europe	June 1999	WEA Records	3984277222
