= Jason Singh =

Australian musician (born 1974)

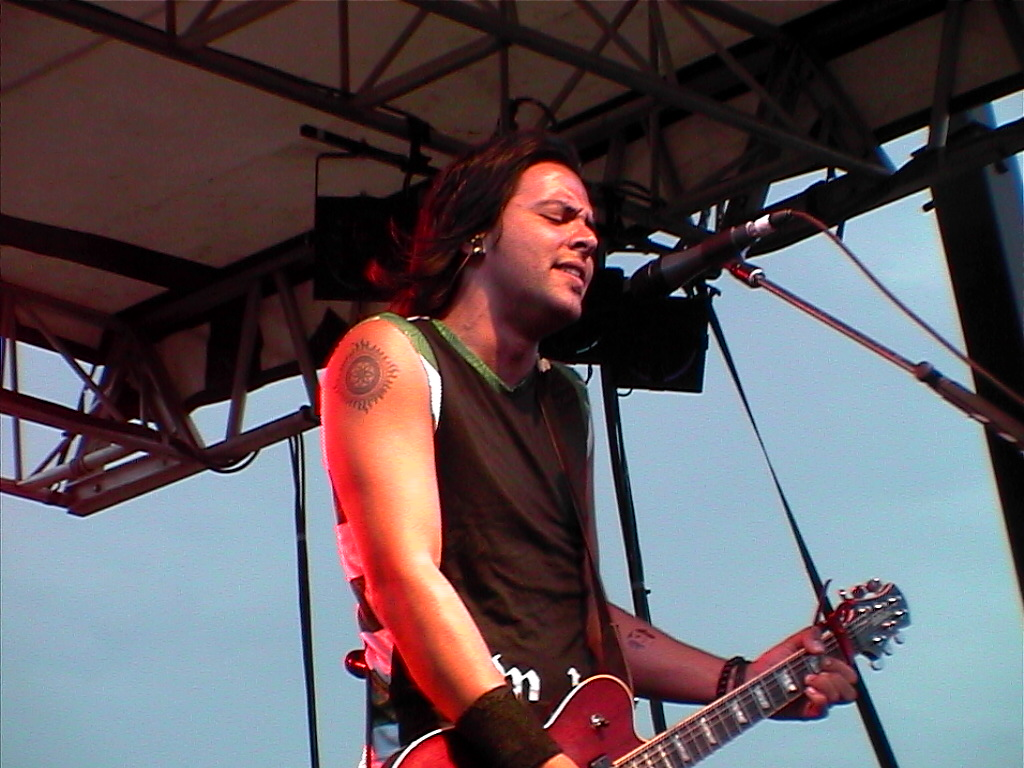
- Singh performing with Taxiride at the Hunter Valley in November 2002

Background information
- Born: Jason Mahendra Singh; 12 March 1974 (age 52); Melbourne, Victoria, Australia
- Genres: Pop, rock
- Occupation: Musician
- Instruments: Vocals, guitar
- Years active: 1997–present
- Label: Neon/Warner
- Member of: Taxiride
- Website: jasonsingh.com.au

Jason Mahendra Singh (born 12 March 1974) is an Australian singer-songwriter-guitarist. Since 1997 he has performed in rock band Taxiride as co-lead singer alongside Tim Watson and Tim Wild. In March 2009 he issued a duet single, "The World As You Know It", with Todd Watson, that peaked at No. 10 on the ARIA Club Tracks chart.

== Biography ==
Jason Mahendra Singh was born in Melbourne and has two older sisters. His father, Mahendra Singh, is an Indo-Fijian, and his mother is of Maltese descent. While in high school Singh formed a covers band, Mud, singing lead vocals. He started playing guitar in the mid-1990s. He played in the live music scene in Melbourne throughout the 1990s.

Singh joined forces with Tim Watson and Tim Wild in 1997; in October 2013 recalled his first time singing with Wild and Watson, "I sang Tracy Chapman's 'Give Me One Reason'. They changed the key higher, and I could do it. They kept changing the key higher and higher, and I could still do it... The next day they said, 'You’re in the band'." Fellow bandmates were Daniel Hall on bass guitar, guitar and vocals; Tim Watson on lead guitar and vocals; and Tim Wild on guitar and vocals.

The group recorded a demo at Melbourne's Secret Sound Studios, and used it to land a contract with Warner in 1999. Taxiride went on to achieve a number-one album and seven top 40 singles.

In March 2009 Singh issued a duet single, "The World As You Know It" with Todd Watson, which peaked at No. 10 on the ARIA Club Tracks. He released his debut solo album, Humannequin, in 2012. In 2015 he set himself a goal of writing, proceeding and releasing six singles in 12 months. The first single was released in October 2015 and the sixth in August 2016. He held a special performance on 2 September 2016 at Flying Saucer Club in Melbourne to celebrate the achievement. It was the first chance to hear all six songs in a live arena. In 2024, after a trademark dispute with Taxiride founding members Tim Wild and Tim Watson plus long time members Sean McLeod and Andy McIvor, Singh now tours his own version of Taxiride called Taxiride ft. Jason Singh. Singh is the only member of the original band to feature in this lineup. Wild, Watson, McLeod and McIvor continue to tour as Taxiride ft. TTSAR.

=== Personal life ===
Jason Singh and his wife, Leah, have been together since about 1997. They are the parents of two children.

== Discography ==
=== Albums ===
List of albums, with selected details
Title	Album details
Humannequin	Released: 24 September 2013; Label: Singing Fish, Ambition Entertainment (AMBITION006); Format: Digital download, Compact Disc
Vale	Released: 14 September 2018; Label: Jason Singh Music; Format: Digital download, Compact Disc, Streaming
Jason Singh plays Taxiride – Hits, Bits and Beyond	Released: 14 January 2022; Label: Jason Singh Music; Format: Digital download, Streaming

=== Singles ===
List of singles
Title	Year	Album
"The World As You Know It" (Todd Watson and Jason Singh)	2009	—N/a
"I Can Dream"	2010	—N/a
"Hold On Forever"	2013	Humannequin
"Speakers"	2014	Humannequin
"I Can Dream" (re-release)	2014	Humannequin
"Quicksand"	2015	—N/a
"Your Love"	2015	—N/a
"If It’s a Dream"	2016	—N/a
"Feel for You"	2016	—N/a
"Humanise"	2016	—N/a
"Surrender"	2016	—N/a
"Love Is What I Need"(Alex 2morrow featuring Jason Singh)	2017	—N/a
"This Time"(Gamble with Jason Singh)	2018	—N/a
"Last Goodbye"	2018	Vale
