= Taxiride =

Australian rock band

- Origin: Melbourne, Victoria, Australia
- Genres: Alternative rock, power pop, pub rock
- Years active: 1996–2008, 2015–present
- Labels: Warner, Sire, Mandarin Music
- Members: Taxiride ft. Tim Watson, Tim Wild, Sean McLeod, Andy McIvor & Ripley Smith: Tim Watson; Tim Wild; Sean McLeod; Andy McIvor; Ripley Smith Taxiride ft. Jason Singh: Jason Singh
- Past members: Dan Hall; Jimmy Christo; Taylor Sheridan
- Website: taxiride-ttsar.com.au facebook.com/TAXIRIDEftTTSAR/ taxiride-ft-jasonsingh.com

Taxiride are an Australian rock band. Formed in Melbourne by singer-songwriters Tim Watson and Tim Wild, who were soon joined by Jason Singh and Dan Hall. Taxiride would record two consecutive platinum-selling albums. The band have had nine top-40 singles including top-five hits "Get Set" (written by Wild), "Everywhere You Go" (written by Watson and Wild) and the most played song on Australian radio in 2002, "Creepin' Up Slowly" (written by Dow Brain, Brad Young and Taxiride).

Prior to formation, the members of Taxiride—Hall, Singh, Watson and Wild—had been playing in cover bands around Melbourne. The quartet recorded an EP, which a taxi-driving friend of theirs helped promote. They took their name from the experience had by passengers first hearing their music on a taxi ride. After their music was heard by an executive from record label Warner, the band signed a contract and released their debut album, Imaginate, in 1999. This was followed by 2002's Garage Mahal. Both albums were certified platinum by the Australian Recording Industry Association (ARIA). 2005's Axiomatic did not follow in the success of its predecessors.

Taxiride's musical style has changed significantly over the course of their career—from a hybrid pop/pub rock sound merged with classic harmony referencing bands like Crosby, Stills, Nash & Young to a heavier sound on later works. Throughout their history, the band has had multiple lead singers and songwriters on the majority of their songs. The band continued performing live until 2008.

In 2015 the four original members reformed and performed on the Australian festival circuit as well as public shows. After a trademark dispute and settlement in 2024 between Jason Singh and other original members Tim Wild, Tim Watson plus longtime members Sean McLeod and Andy McIvor, there are now two versions of Taxiride who tour Australia.

== History ==
=== Formation and early work (1996–1999) ===
Prior to forming Taxiride, Tim Watson, Tim Wild, Jason Singh, and Dan Hall had each played in cover bands across Melbourne. Watson and Wild began writing together for what would become Taxiride in late 1995 in Camberwell, Melbourne. The pair had worked together in a previous band for about 5 years before they were joined by Jimmy Christo in 1996 and Jason Singh in 1997. Christo left the group in 1997. The trio then invited Hall, whom Wild first encountered busking, to join the group, and he accepted. Originally their name was to be TAXE, but they quickly changed that after finding out another band had the same name. The band ultimately named themselves Taxiride because they had given some of their early work to a friend of theirs, a taxi driver, who had tested these songs on passengers. The group produced a demo at Melbourne's Secret Sound Studios, and used it to land a contract with Warner Music Group in Australia. Meanwhile, a friend of the group passed their work onto a Sire Records executive in the U.S., who signed them despite the group being unknown.

=== Pop success (1999–2002) ===
In 1998, Taxiride relocated to Ocean Way Recording studios in Los Angeles to work with producer Jack Joseph Puig on its debut album. Imaginate, released on 1 June 1999 in the U.S. and 18 October in Australia, reached number one on the ARIA Albums Chart, with debut single "Get Set" reaching number eight on the ARIA Singles Chart, number 41 on the New Zealand Singles Chart, and number 36 on the Hot Modern Rock Tracks chart in America. "Get Set" won the 1999 ARIA Award for "Breakthrough Artist – Single" and was nominated for "Best Pop Release", while Imaginate was nominated for "Breakthrough Artist – Album" and "Highest Selling Album" in 2000. Imaginate was certified double platinum, indicating an excess of 140,000 sales.

Taxiride wrote the majority of the album in a studio, and the final product generally used songs that band members had worked on individually. Imaginate earned a mediocre reception from critics. Steve Kurutz of Allmusic gave it three stars, calling the album a "slick...bid for pop radio". The use of a sitar on "Get Set" was praised, as was the Beatles influence and Puig's production. To promote the album, Taxiride toured Australia, America, Japan, and Europe, with the album selling well in all areas. Despite the album's success, Hall left the band to work independently and with his other pet project, Airway Lanes. Hall said he was unhappy with "the pop direction the band was taking".

Following Hall's departure, the band recruited drummer Sean McLeod and bass guitarist Andy McIvor who had been recording and performing with the band since 1997 and 1998 respectively. Taxiride began work on their second album, Garage Mahal which was released on 5 August 2002, producing three singles: "Creepin' Up Slowly", "How I Got This Way", and "Afterglow". All three songs charted in Australia; "Creepin' Up Slowly" was the most successful at number six, also reaching number 19 in New Zealand. In 2002, Garage Mahal and "Creepin' Up Slowly" were certified platinum by ARIA.

Much of Garage Mahal was written on the road, while touring, and as such had a different sound from the band's prior work. Most of the writing was done in two places; Mount Macedon in Victoria, and Palindrome Studio in Venice Beach, California, the home of producer Fred Maher. Mixing was done by David Way and Mike Shipley. Despite the change in sound, the band were still seen as purely a pop band—Australian Musician magazine claimed this was because they spent too much time overseas. Gary Glauber of PopMatters praised the album, noting it had not lost the quality of its predecessor, although it was a good deal heavier. Glauber reported on the overall high quality of songs, noting that "almost any of these songs could work as a single", and calling the lyrics of "Creepin' Up Slowly" "perpetually catchy". Bernard Zuel of The Sydney Morning Herald said that the band did not hold back in their aim for American radio, calling the lyrics overly generic, and arguing the band only focused on their mainstream image.

=== Independent and acoustic (2003–2008) ===
Watson left Taxiride in 2004, and the band began work on a new album. They decided to release independently after splitting up with Warner Music, and recorded at Wild's Melbourne home for a total of 12 months. During that time, the band collaborated with vocalist Chris Bailey (The Saints lead singer) and Hall, who took time out from working with Airway Lanes. Taxiride's third album, Axiomatic, was released on 5 September 2005, shortly after the first single, "Oh Yeah". It would be the only song to chart from the album, reaching number 40 in Australia. To support the album, the band toured India as part of VH1's Rock Rumble.

Following the release of Axiomatic, Wild and Singh began to write new songs, accompanied by Hall. The band's first acoustic album, Electrophobia, was released on 16 September 2006 on Australian record label Liberation. It features songs from the band's first three albums, all recorded in a standalone session in a Melbourne church on 26 May 2006. The production was arranged by Rob John (producer for Led Zeppelin and The Tea Party).

=== Reformation (2015–present) ===
In 2015, the original lineup reformed. In July 2017, Dan Hall elected to take a break from the group to focus on other musical projects, including South Side Rebel and Interlocker. Following the COVID-19 pandemic the band reformed with Tim Watson, Tim Wild, Sean McLeod, Andy McIvor, and guitarist Ripley Smith. The Taxiride trademark was applied for by founding members Tim Watson and Tim Wild and contested by Jason Singh. The matter was settled in 2024 with Watson, Wild and Singh owning the Taxiride name. There are now two versions of Taxiride touring Australia, Taxiride featuring Tim Watson, Tim Wild, Sean McLeod, Andy McIvor & Ripley Smith, and another version Taxiride featuring Jason Singh.

In September 2025, Original member Dan Hall reunited with Tim Watson and Tim Wild to perform with Taxiride ft TTSAR at the Brunswick Ballroom in Victoria, Australia.

On 15 November 2026, it was announced that co-founder and former member Daniel James Hall had died suddenly at the age of 48 on 13 November.

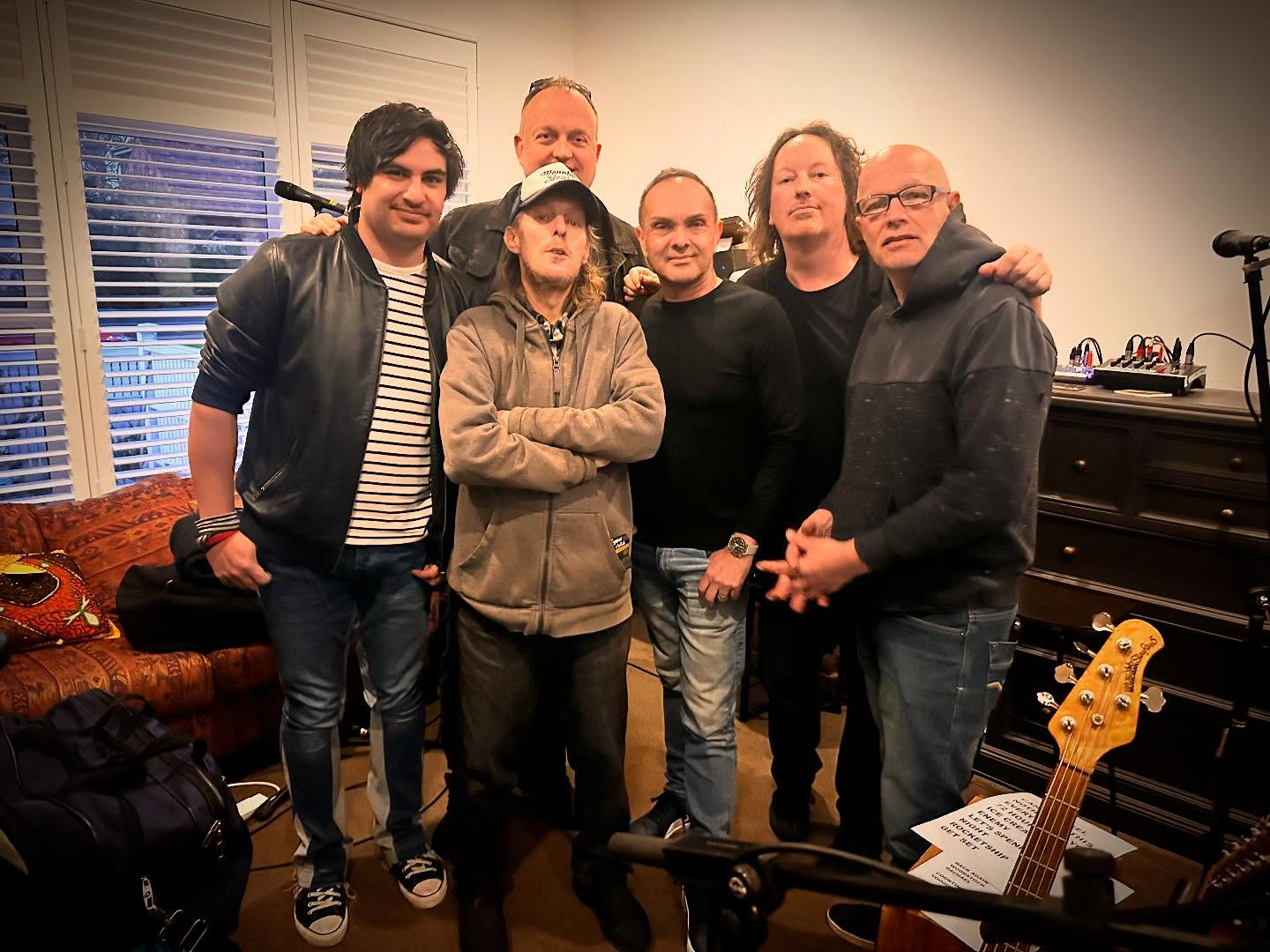
A Taxiride ft TTSAR rehearsal held on 9th September 2025 with special guest Dan Hall ahead of a special reunion performance at the Brunswick Ballroom. Left to Right: Ripley Smith, Dan Hall, Tim Watson, Sean McLeod, Tim Wild and Andy McIvor.

== Musical style ==
"Creepin' Up Slowly"
The chorus of "Creepin' Up Slowly" demonstrates what Mike Zwerin of The International Herald Tribune described as Taxiride's strength in multiple singers.

Taxiride is primarily a pop rock band, also drawing influences from pub rock. Allmusic's Ed Nimmervoll said that the band distanced themselves from the boy band generation, comparing them to Crosby, Stills, Nash, & Young. Steve Kurutz, in reviewing Imaginate, related the album to the pop work of The Beatles, The Beach Boys, and The Everly Brothers, labelling the album as a bid for pop radio.

The International Herald Tribune's Mike Zwerin noted the band's style of having "four lead singers, four potential front men"—Imaginate's strength was in their collective sound, argued Zwerin. On Garage Mahal, Taxiride had three active singer-songwriters, with their strong opinions on musical content clashing frequently. Singh told Dan Grunebaum of Metropolis Tokyo that the arguments came about "because we were very passionate about what goes down onto tape", and so they were resolved by recognising the overall goal of the band's work.

== Discography ==
Studio albums

- Imaginate (1999)
- Garage Mahal (2002)
- Axiomatic (2005)
- Electrophobia (2006)

== Awards and nominations ==
=== ARIA Music Awards ===
The ARIA Music Awards is an annual awards ceremony that recognises excellence, innovation, and achievement across all genres of Australian music. They commenced in 1987.

Year	Nominee / work	Award	Result	Ref.
1999	"Get Set"	Breakthrough Artist – Single	Won	
1999	"Get Set"	Best Pop Release	Nominated	
2000	Imaginate	Breakthrough Artist – Album	Nominated	
2000	Imaginate	Highest Selling Album	Nominated	
