= Killing Heidi discography =

- Studio albums: 3
- Singles: 10
- B-sides: 6
- Music videos: 7

The discography of Australian band Killing Heidi.

== Studio albums ==
Year	Album details	Chart positions		Certifications (sales thresholds)
Year	Album details	AUS	NZ	Certifications (sales thresholds)
2000	Reflector: Released: 12 March 2000; Label: Wah Wah	1	19	ARIA: 4× Platinum
2002	Present: Released: 25 October 2002; Label: Wah Wah	12	—	ARIA: Gold
2004	Killing Heidi: Released: 30 August 2004; Label: Wah Wah	7	—	ARIA: Gold

== Singles ==
Year	Title	Chart positions		Certifications	Album
Year	Title	AUS	NZ	Certifications	Album
1999	"Weir"	6	41	ARIA: Platinum	Reflector
1999	"Mascara"/"Leave Me Alone"	1	48	ARIA: Platinum	Reflector
2000	"Live Without It"	5	28	ARIA: Gold	Reflector
2000	"Superman Supergirl"	57	—		Reflector
2001	"Heavensent"	28	—	ARIA: Gold	Present
2002	"Outside of Me"	12	—	ARIA: Gold	Present
2004	"I Am"	16	—	ARIA: Gold	Killing Heidi
2004	"Calm Down"	23	—		Killing Heidi

=== B-sides ===
Year	Song	From single
1999	"Astral Boy" (acoustic mix)	"Weir"
1999	"Leave Me Alone"	"Mascara"
1999	"Superstar"	"Mascara"
2000	"Teen Angst Unrequited Love Song"	"Live Without It"
2000	"Pins and Needles"	"Live Without It"
2000	"Black Sheep"	"Superman Supergirl"
2002	"Up & Down"	"Heavensent"
2002	"What You Say I'll Do"	"Heavensent"
2002	"Nutha F..ken Love Song"	"Heavensent"
2002	"Buttup"	"Outside of Me"
2002	"Taxi Driver"	"Outside of Me"
2002	"Wartorn Way"	"Outside of Me"
2004	"Fresh Air"	"I Am"
2004	"Never Know Me"	"Calm Down"
2004	"See What's Inside"	"Calm Down"

== Music videos ==
Year	Song	Director
1999	"Weir"	Jolyon Watkins
1999	"Mascara"	Paul Kosky
2000	"Weir" (US version)	Dave Meyers
2000	"Live Without It"	Paul Butler
2000	"Superman Supergirl"	Karl von Möller
2001	"Heavensent"	Bart Borghesi
2002	"Outside of Me"	Michael Spiccia
2004	"I Am"	Michael Spiccia
2004	"Calm Down"	Mark Molloy
