= List of awards and nominations received by Rachel Griffiths =

Rachel Griffiths awards and nominations
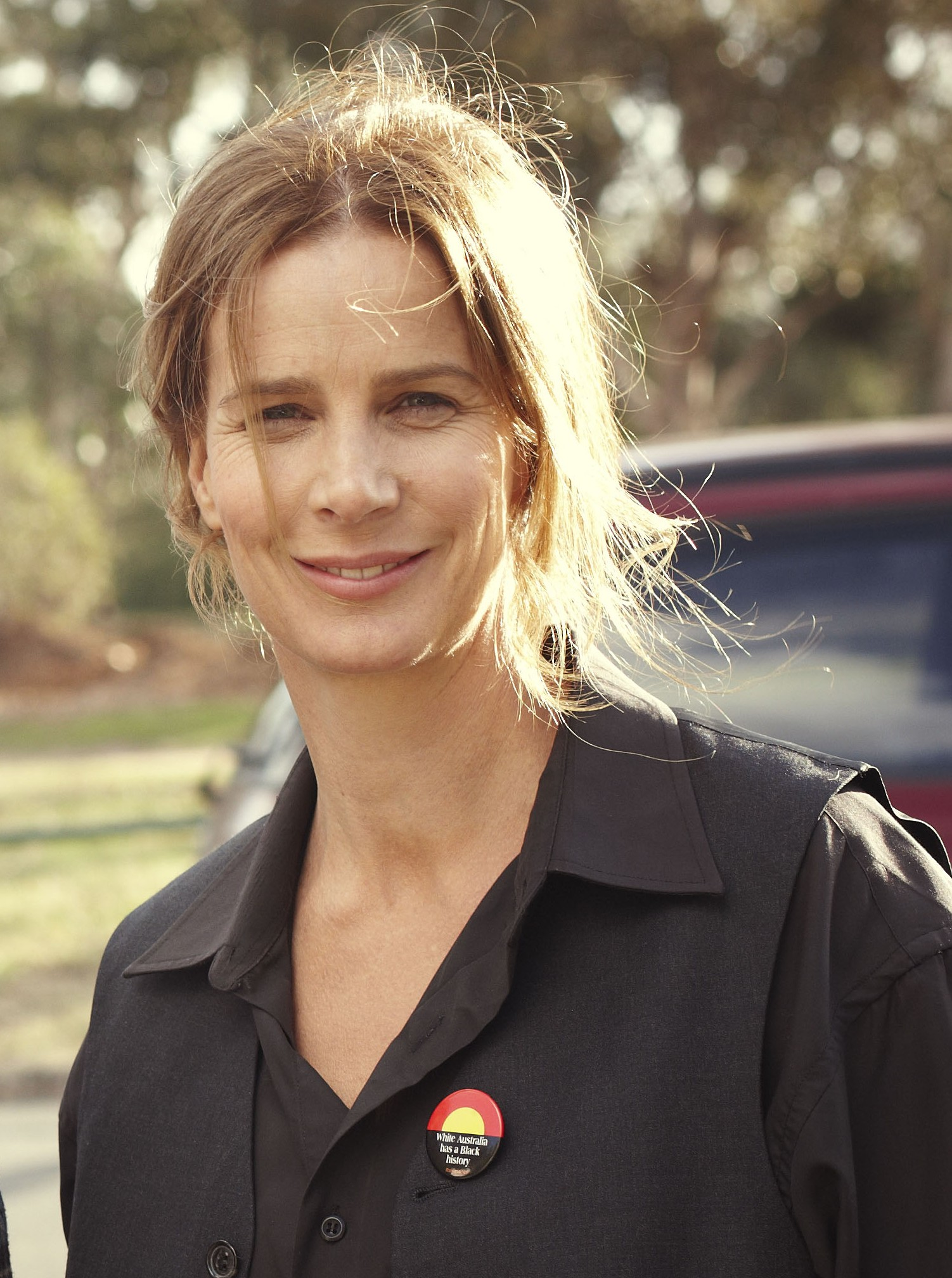
- Griffiths in 2012
Awards and nominations
Award	Wins	Nominations
Totals
AACTA Awards	2	6
Academy Awards	0	1
Golden Globe Awards	1	4
Helpmann Awards	1	1
Screen Actors Guild Awards	2	6
11	Won
37	Nominated

Rachel Griffiths is an Australian actress and director who initially came to acclaim for her appearance in the 1994 Australian comedy film Muriel's Wedding, which earned her an AACTA Award for Best Supporting Actress. She would later gain critical recognition for her role in Hilary and Jackie (1998), which earned her an Academy Award nomination for Best Supporting Actress. Griffiths would later receive critical praise for her performances on the American television series Six Feet Under (2001–2005), for which she would earn a Golden Globe Award and two Screen Actors Guild Awards; and Brothers & Sisters, for which she earned two Golden Globe nominations and two Primetime Emmy Award nominations.

== AACTA Awards ==
Formerly known as the Australian Film Institute Awards prior to 2010.

Year	Nominated work	Category	Result	Ref.
1994	Muriel's Wedding	Best Actress in a Supporting Role	Won	
1997	Amy	Best Actress in a Leading Role	Nominated	
2000	Me Myself I	Best Actress in a Leading Role	Nominated	
2002	The Hard Word	Best Actress in a Leading Role	Nominated	
2009	Beautiful Kate	Best Actress in a Supporting Role	Won	
2016	Hacksaw Ridge	Best Actress in a Supporting Role	Nominated	

== Academy Awards ==
Year	Nominated work	Category	Result	Ref.
1999	Hilary and Jackie	Best Supporting Actress	Nominated	

== Australian Film Institute International Awards ==
Year	Nominated work	Category	Result	Ref.
2006	Six Feet Under	Best Actress	Won	
2007	Brothers & Sisters	Best Actress	Nominated	
2008	Brothers & Sisters	Best Actress	Nominated	

== British Independent Film Awards ==
Year	Nominated work	Category	Result	Ref.
1997	My Son the Fanatic	Best Performance by an Actress in a British Independent Film	Nominated	
1999	Hilary and Jackie	Best Performance by an Actress in a British Independent Film	Nominated	

== Golden Globe Awards ==
Year	Nominated work	Category	Result	Ref.
2001	Six Feet Under	Best Supporting Actress – Series, Miniseries or Television Film	Won	
2003	Six Feet Under	Best Actress – Television Series Drama	Nominated	
2008	Brothers & Sisters	Best Supporting Actress – Series, Miniseries or Television Film	Nominated	
2009	Brothers & Sisters	Best Supporting Actress – Series, Miniseries or Television Film	Nominated	

== Helpmann Awards ==
Year	Nominated work	Category	Result	Ref.
2003	Proof	Best Female Actor in a Play	Won	

== Irish Film and Television Awards ==
Year	Nominated work	Category	Result	Ref.
2016	Mammal	Best International Actress	Nominated	

== London Film Festival ==
Year	Nominated work	Category	Result	Ref.
1998	Tulip	Best Short Film	Won	

== Melbourne International Film Festival ==
Year	Nominated work	Category	Result	Ref.
1998	Tulip	OCIC Awards	Won	
2002	Roundabout	Best Australian Short Film	Won	

== Palm Springs International ShortFest ==
Year	Nominated work	Category	Result	Ref.
1999	Tulip	Best Film	Won	

== Primetime Emmy Awards ==
Year	Nominated work	Category	Result	Ref.
2002	Six Feet Under	Outstanding Lead Actress in a Drama Series	Nominated	
2003	Six Feet Under	Outstanding Supporting Actress in a Drama Series	Nominated	
2007	Brothers & Sisters	Outstanding Supporting Actress in a Drama Series	Nominated	
2008	Brothers & Sisters	Outstanding Supporting Actress in a Drama Series	Nominated	

== Satellite Awards ==
Year	Nominated work	Category	Result	Ref.
2007	Brothers & Sisters	Best Supporting Actress – Series, Miniseries or Television Film	Nominated	

== Screen Actors Guild Awards ==
Year	Nominated work	Category	Result	Ref.
1998	Hilary & Jackie	Outstanding Performance by a Female Actor in a Supporting Role	Nominated	
2002	Six Feet Under	Outstanding Performance by an Ensemble in a Drama Series	Nominated	
2003	Six Feet Under	Outstanding Performance by an Ensemble in a Drama Series	Won	
2004	Six Feet Under	Outstanding Performance by an Ensemble in a Drama Series	Won	
2005	Six Feet Under	Outstanding Performance by an Ensemble in a Drama Series	Nominated	
2006	Six Feet Under	Outstanding Performance by an Ensemble in a Drama Series	Nominated	

== Critics' awards ==
=== Chicago Film Critics Association ===
Chicago Film Critics Association
Year	Nominated work	Category	Result
1998	Hilary and Jackie	Best Supporting Actress	Nominated

=== Film Critics Circle of Australia ===
Film Critics Circle of Australia
Year	Nominated work	Category	Result
1994	Muriel's Wedding	Best Supporting Actress	Nominated
2000	Me Myself I	Best Supporting Actress	Nominated

=== Television Critics Association Awards ===
Television Critics Association
Year	Nominated work	Category	Result
2002	Six Feet Under	Individual Achievement in Drama	Nominated
