= Orcsik =

Orcsik is a surname. Notable people with the surname include:

- Jessica Orcsik (born 1984), Australian dancer
- John Orcsik (born 1946), Australian actor
