= In Tongues =

In Tongues may refer to:

- Glossolalia or speaking in tongues is the phenomenon of speaking in unintelligible utterances (often as part of religious practices).

== Music ==
- In Tongues (Dark Sermon album), 2013
- In Tongues (Ella Hooper album), 2014
- In Tongues (Joji EP), 2017
