= Overnight Success =

Overnight Success may refer to:

- "Overnight Success" (song), a 1989 song by George Strait
- Overnight Success (Neil Sedaka album), 1975
- Overnight Success (Dave Dobbyn album), 1999
- Overnight Success (Ella Hooper album), 2026
- "Overnight Success" (The Loud House), a 2016 Nickelodeon episode
