= Andrew Taylor (painter) =

Australian painter and printmaker (born 1967)

- Born: 1 January 1967 (age 59); Melbourne, Victoria, Australia
- Education: Victorian College of the Arts
- Known for: Painting, printmaking
- Spouse: Rachel Griffiths (m. 2002)
- Children: 3

Andrew Taylor (born 1 January 1967) is an Australian painter and printmaker.

Taylor was born in Melbourne, Victoria, where he studied at the Victorian College of the Arts from 1985 to 1987, and graduated with a BFA. Some of his works belong to the collections of the Artbank, of the National Gallery of Victoria, of the Shepparton Art Gallery, and to "The Telstra Collection" of the Australian National University. Further works belong to private collections in Australia, in the United States and in France. Taylor has been married to Rachel Griffiths since 2002, with three children.

== Exhibitions ==
- 1988:
  - "New Painting", 312 Lennox Street Gallery, Richmond (solo exhibition)
  - "St. Kilda Now", Linden Centre for Contemporary Arts, St Kilda (group exhibition)
  - "Dominique Segan Drawing Prize", Castlemaine State Festival (group exhibition)
  - "Scotchman Hill Vineyard Art Prize", Geelong Art Gallery, Geelong (group exhibition)
- 1989:
  - "New Paintings", Garry Anderson Galleries, Darlinghurst (solo exhibition)
  - "Art from Elsewhere", University of Tasmania, Sandy Bay (group exhibition)
  - "The Keith and Elisabeth Murdoch Fellowship", Victoria College of the Arts, Melbourne (group exhibition)
  - "Australian Painting 1960–1989", 312 Lennox Street Gallery, Richmond (group exhibition)
- 1990:
  - "Diamonds Are Forever", Botanical Gallery, South Yarra (solo exhibition)
  - "Dominique Segan Drawing Prize", Castlemaine State Festival (group exhibition)
  - "Scotchman Hill Vineyard Art Prize", Geelong Art Gallery, Geelong (group exhibition)
  - "Moët & Chandon Touring Exhibition" (group exhibition)
- 1991:
  - "The Sub, Ver'sive Stitch", Mori Gallery, Sydney (group exhibition)
  - "Contemporary Paintings", Pinacotheca, Richmond (group exhibition)
- 1992: "Recent Paintings", Pinacotheca, Richmond (solo exhibition)
- 1993: "Monotypes from the Garner Tullis Workshop", Australian Print Workshop, Fitzroy (group exhibition)
- 1994:
  - "Monotypes", Australian Print Workshop, Fitzroy (solo exhibition)
  - "Workshop Proofs, A Survey of prints from the Archives", Australian Print Workshop, Doncaster Gallery, Doncaster (group exhibition)
- 1995:
  - "Recent Paintings", Scope Gallery, Fitzroy (solo exhibition)
  - "12th Biannual Spring Festival of Drawings", Mornington Peninsula Regional Gallery, Mornington (group exhibition)
  - "Christmas 1995 small works", Scope Gallery, Fitzroy (group exhibition)
- 1996:
  - "Monotypes and works on paper", Scope Gallery, Fitzroy (solo exhibition)
  - "Love", Carlisle Lounge Motel, St Kilda (group exhibition)
- 1997: "Artist for kids Cultural Trust Auction", George Gallery, St Kilda (group exhibition)
- 1998:
  - "Artist for kids Cultural Trust Auction", George Gallery, St Kilda (group exhibition)
  - "Works in Windows", St Kilda Festival (group exhibition)
- 1999:
  - "Artist for kids Cultural Trust Auction", George Gallery, St Kilda (group exhibition)
  - "Works in Windows", St Kilda Festival (group exhibition)
  - "Exposure (Artists portraits of Artists) ", Victoria University Gallery, Melbourne and Linden Centre for Contemporary Arts, St Kilda (group exhibition)
  - "Metropolis Opening Exhibition", Metropolis Gallery, St Kilda (group exhibition)
- 2000:
  - "Recent Paintings", Metropolis Gallery, St Kilda (solo exhibition)
  - "Dobell Prize for Drawing" (finalist), Art Gallery of New South Wales (group exhibition)
- 2002: "Recent Work" MHA Projects, Los Angeles (solo exhibition)
- 2004: "New paintings", Crossley & Scott Gallery, Melbourne (solo exhibition)
- 2005: "New paintings", Crossley & Scott Gallery, Melbourne (solo exhibition)
- 2007: Tim Olsen Gallery, Sydney (solo exhibition)
- 2008:
  - Tim Olsen Gallery, Sydney (solo exhibition)
  - "Nature Morte Dead Nature", Rohrer Fine Art, Laguna Beach, California (group exhibition)
- 2010:
  - Cat Street Galleries (摩羅街中心), Sheung Wan (solo exhibition)
  - "Fresh", Museum of Contemporary Art, Los Angeles (group exhibition)
  - "Beauty and the Baroque", Watergate Hotel, Washington, D.C. (group exhibition)
  - "Landscapes", Heather James Fine Art, Palm Desert, California (group exhibition)
