= APRA Music Awards of 2001 =

Annual Australian music awards

- Date: 28 May 2001
- Location: Sydney, Australia
- Website: http://www.apra-amcos.com.au/

The APRA Music Awards of 2001 were a group of awards given on 28 May 2001, as one in the series of APRA Awards. These are presented annually by Australasian Performing Right Association (APRA) and the Australasian Mechanical Copyright Owners Society (AMCOS).

Only one classical music award was available in 2001: Most Performed Contemporary Classical Composition. APRA and Australian Music Centre (AMC) established the Classical Music Awards in July of the following year. APRA provided awards for "Best Television Theme", and "Best Film Score" in 2001. These were expanded to The Screen Music Awards presented by APRA and Australian Guild of Screen Composers (AGSC) in November 2002.

Also at the 2001 awards ceremony, APRA celebrated its 75th anniversary by presenting the "ten best and most significant Australian songs of the past 75 years", which together with 20 previously announced songs comprise APRA's Top 30 Australian songs of all time.

== Awards ==
Nominees and winners with results indicated on the right.

=== APRA Music Awards ===
Song of the Year
| Title | Artist | Writer | Result |
|---|---|---|---|
| "The Captain" | Kasey Chambers | Kasey Chambers | Nominated |
| "Damage" | You Am I | Tim Rogers | Nominated |
| "Looking Forward, Looking Back" | Slim Dusty | Don Walker | Nominated |
| "My Happiness" | Powderfinger | Jon Coghill, John Collins, Bernard Fanning, Ian Haug, Darren Middleton | Won |
| "Shine" | Vanessa Amorosi | Vanessa Amorosi, Mark Holden, Robert Parde | Nominated |
Songwriters of the Year
| Writer | | | Result |
| Ella Hooper, Jesse Hooper | | | Won |
Ted Albert Award for Outstanding Services to Australian Music
| Name | | | Result |
| Charles Fisher | | | Won |
Most Performed Australian Work
| Title | Artist | Writer | Result |
| "Affirmation" | Savage Garden | Darren Hayes, Daniel Jones | Nominated |
| "Crash and Burn" | Savage Garden | Darren Hayes, Daniel Jones | Nominated |
| "Desensitised" | Invertigo | James Dingli, Vincent Dingli | Nominated |
| "Shine" | Vanessa Amorosi | Vanessa Amorosi, Mark Holden, Robert Parde | Won |
| "We Think It's Love" | Leah Haywood | Leah Cooney, Jorgen Elofsson | Nominated |
Most Performed Australian Work Overseas
| Title | Artist | Writer | Result |
| "I Knew I Loved You" | Savage Garden | Darren Hayes, Daniel Jones | Won |
Most Performed Country Work
| Title | Artist | Writer | Result |
| "Beating Around the Bush" | Adam Brand | Adam Brand, Wayne Burt | Nominated |
| "The Captain" | Kasey Chambers | Kasey Chambers | Won |
| "Diggin' a Hole" | Slim Dusty | Christopher Cook | Nominated |
| "Good Friends" | Adam Brand | Don Walker, Myles Walker | Nominated |
| "Looking Forward, Looking Back" | Slim Dusty | Don Walker | Nominated |
Most Performed Foreign Work
| Title | Artist | Writer | Result |
| "Bent" | Matchbox Twenty | Robert Thomas | Won |
| "Breathless" | The Corrs | Andrea Corr, Caroline Corr, James Corr, Sharon Corr, Robert "Mutt" Lange | Nominated |
| "Pure Shores" | All Saints | Shaznay Lewis, William Orbit | Nominated |
| "Show Me the Meaning of Being Lonely" | Backstreet Boys | Herbie Crichlow, Martin Sandberg | Nominated |
| "Sunshine on a Rainy Day" | Christine Anu | Martin Glover, Zoë Pollock | Nominated |
Most Performed Jazz Work
| Title | Artist | Writer | Result |
| "Hook, Line and Boatshed" | Paul Williamson's Hammond Combo | Paul Williamson | Nominated |
| "Jungle Jive" | Jive Bombers | Christopher Stafford, Peter Morand | Won |
| "McGruff" | Paul Williamson's Hammond Combo | Timothy Neal, Paul Williamson | Nominated |
| "Reason" | Stephen Hunter | Stephen Hunter | Nominated |
| "Unidentified Spaces" | Ten Part Invention | Sandra Evans | Nominated |
Most Performed Contemporary Classical Composition
| Title | Composer | Performer | Result |
| Between Five Bells | Peter Sculthorpe | Roger Wright – piano | Won |
| Piano Concerto | Carl Vine | Sydney Symphony Orchestra | Nominated |
Best Film Score
| Title | | Composer | Result |
| Better Than Sex | | David Hirschfelder | Won |
| Innocence | | Paul Grabowsky | Nominated |
| Looking for Alibrandi | | Alan John | Nominated |
| Me Myself I | | Charlie Chan | Nominated |
Best Television Theme
| Title | | Composer | Result |
| Dream Home | | John Ertler | Nominated |
| Farscape | | Christopher Neal, Braedy Neal | Nominated |
| Last Warriors | | Charlie Chan | Nominated |
| Olympic Theme 2000 | | Burkhard von Dallwitz | Won |
| Something in the Air | | Mark Walmsley, John Kane | Nominated |

== See also ==
- Music of Australia
