= Paula Duncan =

Australian actor

Paula Duncan AM
- Born: Paula Margaret Duncan; 15 September 1952 (age 74); Cooma, New South Wales, Australia
- Occupation: Actress
- Years active: 1971–present
- Known for: Number 96; The Young Doctors; Cop Shop; Prisoner; Richmond Hill; Home and Away
- Spouse(s): John Orcsik (m. 1982; div. 1998) Steve Mason (divorced)
- Children: 2, including Jessica Orcsik
- Family: Carmen Duncan (sister); Donald MacDonald (actor, presenter, screenwriter, novelist) (cousin)

Paula Margaret Duncan AM (born 15 September 1952) is an Australian actress, known for her television roles in Number 96 as Carol Finlayson, The Young Doctors as Lisa Brooks, Cop Shop as Danni Francis and Prisoner as Lorelei Wilkinson.

As well as smaller roles in both Home and Away and Neighbours

== Early life ==
Duncan was born in Cooma, New South Wales, to publicans Rita and Robert on 15 September 1952. She was the youngest of four children, including brothers Bob and Warren, and sister, fellow actress, Carmen Duncan. When she was a young child, she got to present a posy to the Queen on the 1954 Royal Tour.

Duncan went to boarding school at Santa Sabina College in Sydney’s inner western suburbs, where she first developed her interest in arts and drama, with encouragement from the nuns. She subsequently auditioned for Sydney's National Institute of Dramatic Art (NIDA), but was told she was “too immature”. She was accepted into the school at a later date, but quit after two years.

== Career ==
=== Film and television ===
Duncan has played several leading roles in various television series. Early roles were Carol Finlayson in Number 96 (1974–1975), in which her sister Carmen Duncan had previously been a cast member, followed by Nurse Lisa Brooks in The Young Doctors (1976–1977).

She left The Young Doctors to accept the role of Detective Danni Francis in Cop Shop in 1977 – a part created especially for her – and stayed in the role for the series' entire run until 1984, earning several Logie Awards, including twice winning the Logie Award for Most Popular Actress.

After Cop Shop ended, Duncan played Lorelei Wilkinson in Prisoner in 1986 and the same year, appeared in the drama film Jenny Kissed Me alongside Deborra-Lee Furness. This was followed by the role of Janet Bryant in short-lived soap opera Richmond Hill from 1988, for its entire run. She then appeared in an 8-episode recurring role as Bridget Jackson, mother of Emma Jackson (played by Dannii Minogue) in long-running soap opera Home and Away in 1990. She also had guest roles in Paradise Beach (1993–1994) as Joan Hayden and Breakers (1999) as Karen Fairbarn.

Duncan was featured in a surprise tribute on a 1996 episode of This Is Your Life, in part, organised by her mother, who died the day after it aired.

In 2004, Duncan starred alongside Paul Hogan and Michael Caton postmistress, Yvonne, in buddy comedy feature film Strange Bedfellows.

In 2011, Duncan joined the cast of Neighbours as Carolyn Johnstone, a love interest for Harold Bishop (Ian Smith). She had previously appeared in the show as Amy Medway in 1985. In 2015, Duncan starred as Jenny Krilich in the family drama miniseries Hiding, alongside Stephen Curry, Marcus Graham and James Stewart.

Duncan was the subject of an episode of the thirteenth season of SBS series Who Do You Think You Are? in 2022, retracing her ancestry to the Gold Rush and Australian colonial times.

Other guest credits include Certain Women, Skirts, Mother and Son, Pizza, Always Greener and East of Everything She has also made guest appearances on the NRL Footy Show, on the Nine Network.

=== Advertising ===
Duncan is well known to Australian audiences through her work on television commercials, especially humorous commercials for the Ajax household cleaner Spray N' Wipe, from 1988 to 2010.

She also appeared in a television advertisement for 'Sleep Tight', a treatment for snoring and sleep apnea, together with ex-husband John Orcsik.

== Awards and accolades ==
Duncan has won eight Logie Awards, seven of which were awarded during the five years she starred in Cop Shop.

In 1997, she was awarded the Executive Woman of the Year for Contribution to the Arts and the Community. In 2003, she was awarded an Order of Australia in the Queen's Birthday Honours, for Outstanding Contribution to the Entertainment Industry and the Australian Community.

Additionally, she was nominated for the Australia Day Award for work with people with disability, and received an Australian Achievement Award for work in the field.

=== Awards ===
Year	Work	Award	Category	Result	Ref.
1979	Cop Shop	Logie Awards	Most Popular Lead Actress in a Series (Silver Logie)	Won	
1980	Cop Shop	Logie Awards	Most Popular Lead Actress in a Series (Silver Logie)	Won	
1981	Cop Shop	Logie Awards	Most Popular Actress	Won	
1982	Cop Shop	Logie Awards	Most Popular Female Personality (Victorian Award)	Won	
1983	Cop Shop	Logie Awards	Most Popular Female Personality (Victorian Award)	Won	
1984	Cop Shop	Logie Awards	Most Popular Female Personality (Victorian Award)	Won	
1997	Paula Duncan	National Executive Woman of the Year	Combining Corporate & Community Cultural Performing Arts Sector of Australia	Won	
2000	Paula Duncan	"Home For Hope"	Project Award for Excellence (Homelessness)	Awarded	
2000	Paula Duncan	Lifeforce (Suicide Prevention) "This Is Your Life" Event	Most Innovative Project of the Year – Award for Excellence	Awarded	
2003	Paula Duncan	Women In Crisis	Spirit of Mission Award for Contribution to Wesley Mission	Awarded	
2006	Paula Duncan	Shine Awards	Service to the Community	Finalist	
2010	Paula Duncan	National Australia Day Council	Australian of the Year	Nominated	
2012	Paula Duncan	Telstra Business Awards	Women’s Business Award	Nominated	

== Personal life ==
Duncan first met John Orcsik in 1973 on the set of Number 96, before going on to star together with him in Cop Shop from 1979, where they fell in love. They were married in June 1982, and their characters married on Cop Shop soon after.

When Duncan fell pregnant in real life, the producers wrote it into the script. Their daughter Jessica Orcsik was born on Valentine's Day 1984. Jessica has since followed in her parents' footsteps and is an actor and producer.

Duncan and Orcsik opened acting school, The Australian Film & Television Academy (TAFTA) together on the Gold Coast in 1994.

The couple were married for 19 years, before getting divorced in 1998. After their split, at the age of 43, Duncan, suffering from episodic depression, attempted suicide. The couple are still close friends, and have since worked together in the show Paradise Beach amongst other productions.

Duncan's second husband was Steve Mason. The marriage only lasted four years, after she found out he was having an affair via a newspaper article in which he referred to the 'other woman' as "the love of his life". Her co-stars, Paul Hogan and Michael Caton on Strange Bedfellows, which she had been filming at the time alerted her to the affair. Following the end of her marriage, Duncan had a nervous breakdown.

In 2020, Duncan appeared on the Seven Network’s reality show First Dates, on a bet.

Duncan's older sister was stage and screen actor and activist Carmen Duncan, who died in 2019 after battling cancer for years. Duncan became an ambassador for an organisation called WomenCan, to honour her sister's life. She has worked with numerous charities including the Australian Gynaecological Cancer Foundation and Trilogy Care and helped establish the Carmen Duncan Memorial Fund. As of 2025, she has raised more than $12 million for a number of causes. She organises the New South Wales Volunteer of the Year Awards and volunteers twice a week in aged care facilities.

Duncan's cousin was actor, presenter, screenwriter and novellist and administrator Donald MacDonald (1938-2025), best known as an original presenter on Play School.

Duncan's 1981 Silver Logie, awarded during her tenure on Cop Shop was at the centre of a police investigation, after being stolen from the National Trust in 2006.. It had been on loan to the organisation and was due to be displayed in an exhibition at the Old Melbourne Gaol called 'Cops on the Box', commemorating Australian police dramas.

== Filmography ==
=== Film ===
Year	Title	Role	Notes
1974	Casualty Ward		TV film
1975	Polly Me Love		TV film
1978	Cass		TV film
1985	Jenny Kissed Me	Gaynor	Feature film
1987	Future Past	Miss Bernsteen	TV film
1996	Academy	Jennifer Haywood	TV film
2004	Cocktail Hour	Sandra	Film short
2004	Strange Bedfellows	Yvonne Philpot	Feature film
2009	Braille	Madam	Feature film
2011	Surprise Surprise	Muriel	Film short
2015	Natural Injustice	Doreen Smith	Feature film
2017	Torn	Tess Smith	Film short
2020	Unsound	Angela	Feature film

=== Television ===
Year	Title	Role	Notes
1955	Lux Video Theatre	Kitty	Episode: "So Evil My Love"
1973	The Pirates of Penzance		Teleplay
1974	This Love Affair	Joan	Anthology series, episode 8: 'One of My Silly Dreams'
1974	Certain Women		2 episodes
1974–1975; 1977	Number 96	Carol Finlayson	Episodes: "1.669", "1.689", "1.700"
1975	Ain't Got a Barrel of Money		TV pilot
1977	The Young Doctors	Lisa Brooks	121 episodes
1977–1984	Cop Shop	Det. Danni Francis	582 episodes
1984	Matthew and Son	Barbara Dean	TV pilot
1985	Neighbours	Amy Medway	4 episodes
1986	Prisoner	Lorelei Wilkinson	Season 8, 54 episodes
1986	Studio 86	Glenda	Episode: "An Electric Day"
1988	Richmond Hill	Janet Bryant	
1988	Henry Lawson's Australia	Presenter	Video
1990	Home and Away	Bridget Jackson	Season 3, 8 episodes
1990	Skirts	Janine Davies	Episode: "Wolf Whistles"
1992	Mother and Son	Real Estate agent	Episode: "The Clock"
1993; 1994	Paradise Beach	Joan Hayden	2 episodes
1999	Breakers	Karen Fairbarn	
2000	Pizza	Lorelei Wilkinson	Episode: "Gambling Pizza"
2002	Always Greener	Make-up artist	1 episode
2008	East of Everything	Pauline	3 episodes: "No Way to Nirvana", "Save Me Some Scones", "Aesthetic My Arse"
2011	Neighbours	Carolyn Johnstone	Season 27, 7 episodes
2015	Hiding	Jenny Krilich	3 episodes: "1.1", "1.3", "1.8"

== Stage ==
Year	Title	Role	Type	Ref.
1971	The Trial of Lucullus	Jury of the Dead	NIDA production	AusStage
1971	The Diary of Anne Frank	Mrs. Frank		AusStage
1972	Dick Whittington and His Cat			
1974	The Lady's Not for Burning		Genesian Theatre, Sydney	
1983	Salad Days			
1985	Half in Earnest			
1987	Hansel And Gretel's Aussie Adventure			
1987	Blithe Spirit	Ruth	Sydney Opera House, Glen St Theatre, Sydney with AETT	
1988	Bedroom Farce	Jan	Twelfth Night Theatre, Brisbane	
1990	The Lady's Not For Burning			
1995	Brazilian Blue		Twelfth Night Theatre, Brisbane	
1998	Social Climbers			
2002	The Vagina Monologues			
2007	Flying Solo			
2008	Theatresports			
