= Academy (1996 film) =

- Based on: story and synopsis by John Orcsik and Paula Duncan
- Written by: John Orcsik
- Directed by: John Orcsik
- Starring: Tony Bonner; Paula Duncan; Michael McGlinchey
- Country of origin: Australia
- Original language: English

Production
- Producer: Timothy Carter
- Cinematography: Peter Morley
- Editor: Clay Bauman
- Budget: $320,000

Original release
- Release: 1996

Academy is an Australian television drama film made by the Australian Film & TV Academy and Catholic Radio & TV and produced with a low budget on the Gold Coast.

== Cast ==
- Paula Duncan as Jennifer Haywood
- Tony Bonner as Jack Steele
- Michael McGlinchey as William
- Heath Williams as Tim
- Jessica Orcsik as Natalie Steele
- Asia Matthews as Lilly Zabriski
- Suellen Underwood as Geraldine
- Pauline Campton-Lowe as Doris
- Bryan Williams as David Stolz
- Matt Flanagan as Tom
- Azura Adams as Joanna Parsons
