= In Tongues (Ella Hooper album) =

Studio album by Ella Hooper
- Released: 20 November 2014
- Recorded: 2011–14, Melbourne
- Label: Independent
- Producer: J. Skubiszewski

Ella Hooper chronology
In Tongues (2014)	Small Town Temple (2023)

Singles from In Tongues
- 1. "Low High" Released: 25 November 2012; 2. "Haxan" Released: 26 April 2013; 3. "The Red Shoes" Released: 20 June 2014

In Tongues is the debut solo album from Killing Heidi and Verses singer Ella Hooper. The album was delayed multiple times throughout 2013 and 2014 and eventually released via PledgeMusic on 20 November 2014.

== Background and recording ==
Taken from official pledge page

"...It was a quietly confronting and emotionally charged decision to take a break from working with my brother Jess, as I’ve collaborated with him on 99% of my musical adventures since I was a child. Working with him was really the only job/passion/pattern I’d known since I was 13.

...With blocks shifting and longing lifting me into a creative space again, I wrote nightly, furiously, on my beaten up parlour guitar and sang constantly into my IPhone as I walked down the street, garnering a few weird looks along the way I’m sure.

...Jan (Skubiszewski) and I had known each other for years, moved in the same circles and always talked about working together, ‘one day’. In an insanely fruitful (and free, thanks Jan..) trial day we turned one of my acoustic ballads into a synth heavy, programmed drum backed, slightly Twin Peaks flavoured moody-pop piece, and I knew I’d found the right key collaborator for In Tongues. I began travelling daily to Jan’s little but light filled top of shop loft on Smith St (Melbourne). Close enough to N.Lee bakery to get fed, close enough to the Union to get watered"

== PledgeMusic ==
The album was released through PledgeMusic, and eight 7 items were put up for sale. Other items for sale included a physical CD copy of the album, a tea towel hemmed by Ella's grandmother, tote bag, T-shirt, Handmade T-shirts and a Vinyl copy of the album

== Track listing ==
In Tongues
No.	Title	Writer(s)	Producer(s)	Length
1.	"In Tongues"	Ella Hooper; Jan Skubiszewski	J. Skubiszewski	3:01
2.	"Low High"	E. Hooper; J. Skewbiszewski	J. Skewbiszewski	3:31
3.	"HÄXAN"	E. Hooper; J. Skewbiszewski	J. Skewbiszewski	4:21
4.	"Wild Stallionz"	E. Hooper; J. Skewbiszewski	J. Skewbiszewski	3:45
5.	"The Red Shoes"	E. Hooper; J. Skewbiszewski	J. Skewbiszewski	3:32
6.	"Everything Was a Sign"	E. Hooper	J. Skewbiszewski	4:23
7.	"Dead Stars"	E. Hooper; J. Skewbiszewski	J. Skewbiszewski	3:46
8.	"Diamond Like"	E. Hooper; J. Skewbiszewski	J. Skewbiszewski	4:32
9.	"Love Is Hard to Kill"	E. Hooper; J. Skewbiszewski	J. Skewbiszewski	3:26
10.	"Last Rites"	E. Hooper; Jesse Hooper	J. Skewbiszewski	3:53

== Charts ==
Chart (2014)	Peak position
Australian Digital Albums (ARIA)	48
