= Calm Down (Killing Heidi song) =

2004 single by Killing Heidi

Single by Killing Heidi

from the album Killing Heidi
- B-side: "Never Know Me"; "See What's Inside"
- Released: 27 September 2004
- Length: 3:32
- Label: Wah Wah Music; Columbia
- Songwriter(s): Ella Hooper; Jesse Hooper; Adam Pedretti; Warren Jenkin
- Producer(s): John Travis

Killing Heidi singles chronology
"I Am" (2004)	"Calm Down" (2004)

"Calm Down" is a song by Australian rock band Killing Heidi, released as the second single from their third studio album, Killing Heidi (2004). Released as a single on 27 September 2004, the song reached number 23 on the Australian Singles Chart and is Killing Heidi's most recent top-40 hit as of 2025. The video was shot in the open spaces of Broken Hill, New South Wales.

== Track listing ==
Australian CD single

1. "Calm Down" – 3:32
2. "Never Know Me" – 4:39
3. "See What's Inside" – 5:25

== Charts ==
Chart (2004)	Peak position
Australia (ARIA)	23
