= Killing Heidi (album) =

Studio album by Killing Heidi
- Released: 30 August 2004
- Recorded: 2003–2004
- Studio: Bakehouse (Melbourne, Victoria)
- Genre: Rock
- Length: 46:03
- Label: Columbia
- Producer: John Travis

Killing Heidi chronology
Present (2002)	Killing Heidi (2004)

Singles from Killing Heidi
- 1. "I Am" Released: 9 July 2004; 2. "Calm Down" Released: 24 September 2004

Professional ratings
Review scores
Source	Rating
Undercover	(favourable)

Killing Heidi is the third album by Australian rock band Killing Heidi, released by Columbia Records in Australia on 30 August 2004 (see 2004 in music). It was the band's first album without their producer Paul Kosky—who worked on their previous albums and has a more "sophisticated and grittier" feel to it with the lead singer, Ella Hooper, stating that releasing the album is "just like a re-launch". Killing Heidi debuted in the top ten on the Australian ARIA Albums Chart, making it their second top ten album and sales were similar to those of Killing Heidi's second album, Present (2002) – both were certified gold by ARIA for 35,000 units shipped. Their third album gave Killing Heidi another top twenty single with "I Am", but its second single, "Calm Down" was not a major hit.

The band's mandate for the album was to "keep things simple", with lead singer Hooper stating "More than ever before, this record is about us just being ourselves." The album was produced in Los Angeles with English/Indian producer John Travis (Kid Rock, Sugar Ray). Hooper described him as "a bloody brilliant guy to work with. John guided us well but also really listened to our ideas and encouraged our feedback. We were more of a part of this album than anything we have done before." Hooper also stated that her vocals had improved a lot since the previous album. "I was having a really shitty time with my voice and because of the operation I couldn't get it where I wanted it on the last album [Present]. There's this one note in 'Way Home' which I could never dreamed of hitting a year ago."

The album debuted on the Australian ARIA Albums Chart at number seven on 6 September 2004 and was certified gold by ARIA with shipments of 35,000 copies. The album fell down the charts from then on, spending nine weeks in the top fifty, only twice rising back up the chart.

== Track listing ==
All songs written by Jesse and Ella Hooper, except where noted.

1. "I Am" (Lukas Burton, Ella Hooper, Jesse Hooper, Warren Jenkin, Adam Pedretti) – 3:26
2. "Not for Me" – 4:02
3. "Way Home" – 3:29
4. "Coming On" – 3:49
5. "Notebook" – 4:23
6. "Calm Down" (Hooper, Hooper, Jenkin, Pedretti) – 3:41
7. "Summer Long" – 4:02
8. "Miss You" – 3:43
9. "Running Underwater" – 4:03
10. "Undertow" – 4:39
11. "Your Hands" – 3:38
12. "So Long" – 3:08

== Singles ==
- "I Am"

The first single had a heavier rock tone than previous releases, and was welcomed by Australian radio. It spent 11 weeks in Australia's top 50, peaking at No. 16, selling over 35,000 copies to be certified Gold. It was an official song for the release of Spider-Man 2, but was not featured in the film itself, and was only featured on the Australian edition of the soundtrack.

- "Calm Down

Released as single number two, the song was lead singer Ella's favourite. It spent 6 weeks inside Australia's top 50, peaking at No. 23. It was their biggest radio hit since their debut "Weir", but this did not show in its sales. It was the second release of Killing Heidi's career not to be certified for its sales, but sold approximately 20,000 copies.

- "Running Underwater"

Released to radio as the third single; like the group's second album Present, the third single was under-promoted, received little airplay and an expected physical single was scrapped due to little airplay and promotion.

== Charts ==
Chart (2004)	Peak position
Australian Albums (ARIA)	7

== Certifications ==
Region	Certification	Certified units/sales
Australia (ARIA)	Gold	35,000^{^}
^{^} Shipments figures based on certification alone.

== Release history ==
Region	Date	Label	Format	Catalog
Australia	30 August 2004	Columbia Records	CD	5177162000
