= Mascara (song) =

1999 single by Killing Heidi

Single by Killing Heidi

from the album Reflector
- A-side: "Leave Me Alone"
- B-side: "Superstar" (acoustic); "Katrina" (acoustic)
- Released: 11 October 1999
- Length: 4:50
- Label: Wah-Wah; Roadshow
- Songwriters: Ella Hooper; Jesse Hooper
- Producer: Paul Kosky

Killing Heidi singles chronology
"Weir" (1999)	"Mascara" / "Leave Me Alone" (1999)	"Live Without It" (2000)

Music video
- "Mascara" on YouTube

"Mascara" is the second single released by Australian rock band Killing Heidi from their debut album, Reflector (2000). It was released on 11 October 1999, when their debut single, "Weir", was still on the Australian Singles Chart. A re-release of "Mascara" was issued as a double A-side with "Leave Me Alone" in January 2000; it was this version that topped the Australian chart, becoming Killing Heidi's only number-one hit in their native country. "Mascara" was later released in the United States in 2001. In January 2018, as part of Triple M's "Ozzest 100", the 'most Australian' songs of all time, "Mascara" was ranked number 90.

== Chart performance ==
The original two-track release of "Mascara" debuted on 10 November 1999 at number 47 on the ARIA Singles Chart. After seven weeks, it peaked at number three. On 24 January 2000, the deluxe single debuted at number one and stayed there for three weeks. After a combined total of 23 weeks, it exited the top 50. The single was certified platinum by the Australian Recording Industry Association for shipping over 70,000 copies.

== Music video ==
The music video for "Mascara" was recorded and released in 2000. It is directed by Paul Kosky. A music video was not filmed for "Leave Me Alone".

== Track listings ==
Australian original release

1. "Mascara" (radio edit)
2. "Superstar" (acoustic mix)
3. "Katrina" (acoustic mix)

"Mascara" / "Leave Me Alone"

1. "Mascara" (radio edit)
2. "Leave Me Alone" (radio mix)
3. "Weir" (acoustic mix)
4. "Superstar" (acoustic mix)
5. "Weir" (radio mix)

== Charts ==
=== Weekly charts ===
Chart (2000)	Peak position
Australia (ARIA) "Mascara"	3
Australia (ARIA) "Mascara" / "Leave Me Alone"	1
New Zealand (Recorded Music NZ) "Mascara" / "Leave Me Alone"	48

=== Year-end charts ===
Chart (2000)	Position
Australia (ARIA)	26

== Certification ==
Region	Certification	Certified units/sales
Australia (ARIA)	Platinum	70,000^{^}
^{^} Shipments figures based on certification alone.

== Release history ==
Region	Version	Date	Format(s)	Label(s)	Ref(s).
Australia	"Mascara"	11 October 1999	CD	Wah-Wah; Roadshow	
Australia	"Mascara" / "Leave Me Alone"	10 January 2000	CD	Wah-Wah; Roadshow	
United States	"Mascara"	23 January 2001	Alternative radio	Universal	
United States	"Mascara"	5 February 2001	Hot adult contemporary radio	Universal	
United States	"Mascara"	6 February 2001	Contemporary hit radio	Universal	
