= Pip Karmel =

Australian filmmaker (born 1963)

- Born: Philippa Karmel; 1963 (age 62–63); Adelaide, South Australia, Australia
- Occupations: Film editor, director, screenwriter
- Years active: 1984–present

Philippa "Pip" Karmel (born 1963) is an Australian filmmaker. As a film editor, she has worked exclusively with director Scott Hicks in a notable collaboration from 1988 through 2007; their work together includes the 1996 film Shine. She has directed and written several films, including Me Myself I (2000), which was released internationally.

== Early life and education ==
Philippa "Pip" Karmel was born in 1963 in Adelaide, South Australia.

She studied visual arts in Adelaide. She subsequently studied film directing and editing at the Australian Film Television and Radio School. She interrupted her studies to edit Scott Hicks' feature Sebastian and the Sparrow (1988), which was her first feature credit as an editor.

Her graduate film was Sex Rules (1989), a short film.

== Career ==
=== Television and Shine ===
In the early 1990s Karmel worked primarily as a director and writer. She directed an episode, The Long Ride, for the Australian television program Under the Skin; the episode won the Australian Film Institute Award for Best Tele-feature. Hicks persuaded Karmel to return to editing for the film, Shine, which Hicks was directing and had co-written. Shine (1996) has become Hicks' most recognised film; it is based on the early life of David Helfgott, who became a concert pianist following several years of institutionalization for mental illness. In his Variety review, David Stratton wrote, "Securing the musician's cooperation was obviously crucial to Jane Scott's accomplished production, which is also distinguished by Geoffrey Simpson's fine camerawork and Pip Karmel's editing, the latter skillfully shaping a wealth of material into a fast-paced, compelling narrative." Karmel has now edited several additional films with Hicks.

== Me Myself I ==
Karmel worked throughout the 1990s on the film Me Myself I (2000), which she wrote and directed. Karmel's script explores the choices made by an unmarried woman who has become a successful journalist; in the film, the woman enters an "alternate reality" in which she is married to a former beau and has three children. The film was mainly seen in Australia, but was internationally distributed and widely reviewed.

== Screenplays ==
Karmel wrote a screenplay for a film adaptation of Geraldine Brooks' 2001 novel, Year of Wonders, a story of a 17th-century plague year in an English village. Karmel was slated to direct the film, but it was still "in development" in 2012.

Karmel and Vincent Sheehan wrote a screenplay for a comedy What Alice Forgot, and in 2012 received a grant to support further development of a film.

In August 2020, it was announced that Karmel would be writing the script for a screen adaptation of The Mothers, written by Genevieve Gannon.

== Recognition and awards ==
Andrew Sarris noted in his review of Me Myself I in The New York Observer, "Ms. Karmel, whether as erstwhile writer, editor, or maker of short films, has earned the right to a long and fruitful directorial career on the strength of Me Myself I, one of the most striking feature-film debuts ever".

Karmel's editing of Shine (1996) was nominated for the Academy Award for Best Film Editing, the BAFTA Award for Best Editing, and an American Cinema Editors Eddie Award, and it won the Australian Film Institute Award for Best Achievement in Editing.

For Me Myself I (2000), Karmel was nominated for the Australian Film Institute Award for Best Direction and for Best Screenplay.

== Filmography ==
This filmography is based on the Internet Movie Database, and incorporates referenced additions to that listing.

=== Editor ===
- Ana Who (documentary) (Karmel, 1984).
- Sebastian and the Sparrow (TV) (Hicks, 1988).
- Shine (Hicks, 1996).
- The Ultimate Athlete (documentary, Hicks, 1996).
- Hearts in Atlantis (Hicks, 2001).
- No Reservations (Hicks, 2007).

=== Director ===
- Ana Who (documentary) (1984)
- Sex Rules (short) (1989). Won the Jury Prize at the ATOM (Australian Teachers of Media) Awards.
- Fantastic Futures (short) (1991). Won Gold Award of the New York Film Festival.
- The Long Ride (1993) (episode of the television series Under the Skin, written by Tony Ayres). Won Australian Film Institute Award for Best Tele-feature.
- Me Myself I (2000). Karmel also wrote the screenplay.
