= Rachel Griffiths =

Australian actress (born 1968)

Rachel Griffiths AM
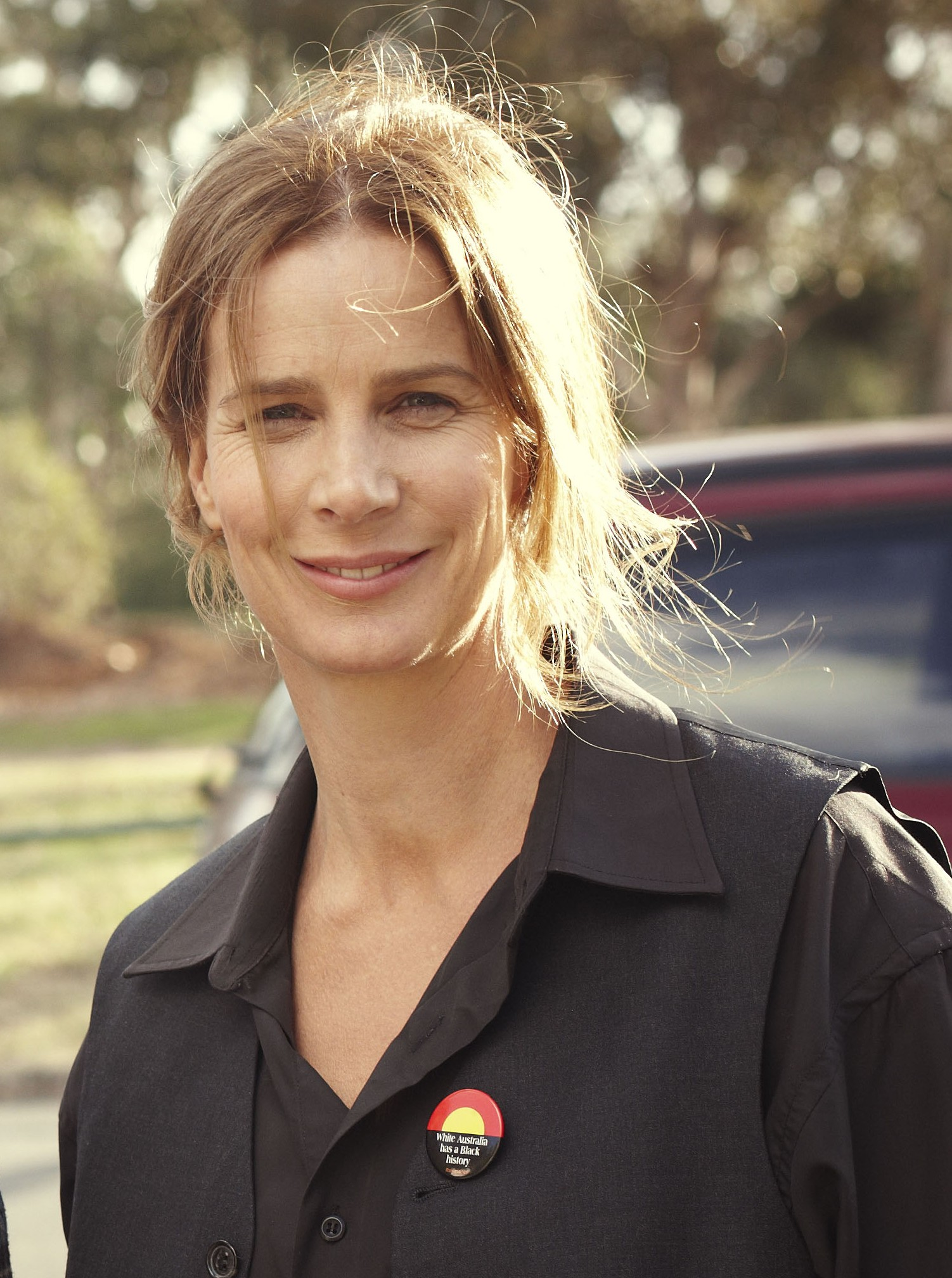
- Griffiths in 2012
- Born: Rachel Anne Griffiths; 18 December 1968 (age 57); Melbourne, Victoria, Australia
- Education: Star of the Sea College; Rusden College
- Occupation: Actress
- Years active: 1987–present
- Spouse: Andrew Taylor (m. 2002)
- Children: 3
- Awards: Full list

Rachel Anne Griffiths (born 18 December 1968) is an Australian actress. Raised primarily in Melbourne, she began her acting career appearing on the Australian series Secrets before being cast in a supporting role in the comedy Muriel's Wedding (1994), which earned her an AACTA Award for Best Actress in a Supporting Role. In 1997, she was the lead in Nadia Tass's drama Amy, followed by her portrayal of Hilary du Pré in Hilary and Jackie (1998), for which she received a nomination for the Academy Award for Best Supporting Actress.

From 2001 to 2005, Griffiths portrayed massage therapist Brenda Chenowith in the HBO series Six Feet Under, for which she earned a Golden Globe Award for Best Actress in 2002 and two Primetime Emmy Award nominations. She subsequently appeared on television as Sarah Walker Laurent on the ABC drama series Brothers & Sisters from 2006 to 2011, for which she was nominated for two additional Primetime Emmy Awards.

She has also had roles in the films Blow (2001), portraying the mother of George Jung; the historical drama Ned Kelly (2003); Step Up (2006), and the Julian Assange television biopic Underground: The Julian Assange Story (2012). In 2016, she appeared in a supporting role in Mel Gibson's biographical war drama Hacksaw Ridge, and in the docudrama miniseries When We Rise, written by Dustin Lance Black.

Onstage, Griffiths appeared in a Melbourne-based production of Proof in 2002, which earned her a Helpmann Award, and later made her Broadway debut in a 2011 critically acclaimed production of Other Desert Cities. In addition to acting, she made her directorial debut with the short film Tulip in 1998, and directed several episodes of the Australian television series Nowhere Boys in 2015.

== Early life and education ==
Rachel Anne Griffiths was born on December 18, 1968, in Melbourne, Australia, and spent her early childhood on the Gold Coast. She is the daughter of Anna and Edward Martin Griffiths. She has two older brothers, Ben and Samuel. She moved to Melbourne at age five, with her mother and brothers. Griffiths was raised Roman Catholic. She recalled first being inspired to become an actress after watching the American miniseries Roots as a child.

Griffiths attended Star of the Sea College, a Catholic girls' high school in Brighton. She earned a Bachelor of Education degree in drama and dance at Victoria College, Rusden (now part of Deakin University). After being rejected from the National Institute of Dramatic Art, Griffiths joined the Woolly Jumpers, a Geelong-based community theatre group. In 1991, she wrote and performed the one-woman show Barbie Gets Hip, which played at the Melbourne Fringe Festival in 1991.

== Career ==
=== 1994–2000: Early work and critical recognition ===
Griffiths portrayed Rhonda Epinstall, the best friend of Toni Collette's titular character, in the 1994 film Muriel's Wedding. Her performance won her critical acclaim and both the Australian Film Critics Award and the Australian Film Institute Awards for Best Supporting Actress. She followed in 1996 with the role of an earthy, ill-mannered pig farmer's daughter in Michael Winterbottom's Jude.

In 1997, Griffiths sparked controversy after showing up uninvited at the opening of the Crown Melbourne in Melbourne, Australia. She was topless when she showed up at the new integrated resort. She stated a wish to protest the views taken by the media and state government towards the new casino, inspired by the story of Lady Godiva.

Griffiths joined forces again with Muriel's Wedding director P. J. Hogan for her American film debut, My Best Friend's Wedding, in 1997. That same year she starred in My Son the Fanatic, a British film in which she portrayed a tough Yorkshire prostitute who becomes involved with a considerably older Pakistani taxicab driver, played by Om Puri. Griffiths received an Academy Award nomination for Best Supporting Actress for her portrayal of real-life flautist Hilary du Pré opposite Emily Watson as her sister, famed cellist Jacqueline "Jackie" du Pre, in Hilary and Jackie (1998). After the release of Hilary and Jackie, Griffiths was cast in the starring role in the Australian comedy Me Myself I (1999).

=== 2001–2011: American television and further acclaim ===
In 2001, Griffiths appeared opposite Natasha Richardson in the English comedy Blow Dry, playing a lesbian hairdresser who enters a hairstyling competition with her lover, followed by the Ted Demme-directed Blow (2001) opposite Johnny Depp and Ray Liotta, in which she played the mother of Boston cocaine magnate George Jung. Nick Nunziata of IGN was critical of Griffiths' performance in the film, writing: "the only performance that doesn't ring true is that of Rachel Griffiths as Jung's mother...she just doesn't connect."

The same year Griffiths appeared in Blow, she was cast as one of the leads in the HBO drama series Six Feet Under. Her performance as emotionally scarred massage therapist, Brenda Chenowith, earned her Golden Globe and Screen Actors Guild Awards, as well as two Emmy Award nominations over the series' five season-run. In the third season, she missed four episodes due to her first pregnancy; her second pregnancy was written into the show's final season and she appeared in almost every episode of the series.

While starring on Six Feet Under, Griffiths continued to occasionally appear in the films, playing the supportive housewife of Dennis Quaid in the Walt Disney drama The Rookie (2002), and in the Australian biopic Ned Kelly (2003), opposite Heath Ledger, Geoffrey Rush, and Orlando Bloom. In the spring of 2002, she appeared in a Melbourne production of Proof by the American playwright David Auburn, for which she earned a Helpmann Award for Best Female Actor in a Play. In 2004, she played a key role in the Hallmark film adaptation of the Kent Haruf novel Plainsong. In 2006, she became part of the ensemble cast, co-starring alongside Sally Field, Calista Flockhart, Balthazar Getty and Matthew Rhys, of the dramatic series Brothers & Sisters, in which she portrays Sarah Walker, who inherits control of the family business after her father's death. Griffiths received a 2007 Emmy nomination and a 2008 Emmy nomination for her work on the series, followed by 2008 and 2009 Golden Globe nominations. Griffiths starred on the series until its conclusion in 2011. Additionally, she appeared as Inez Scull in the 2008 miniseries adaptation of Larry McMurtry's Comanche Moon.

Griffiths made her Broadway debut in Other Desert Cities, directed by Joe Mantello and co-starring Judith Light, Stockard Channing, and Stacy Keach, which began previews on 10 October 2011, opening on 3 November 2011 in Manhattan. David Rooney of The Hollywood Reporter praised both Griffith's performance as well as the overall production, writing: "[The play] has acquired a riveting center in the raw performance of Rachel Griffiths, who makes a knockout New York stage debut. With discreet adjustments to the text and more penetrating characterizations all around from the sterling cast, the balance between comedy and intense family drama has been fine-tuned in richly satisfying ways". Ben Brantley of The New York Times deemed her performance "a beautifully modulated Broadway debut".

=== 2012–present: Return to Australia; directing ===
In 2012, Griffiths returned to live in her native Australia, after having lived and worked in the United States for a decade. She expressed a desire to work less and spend more time with her children after having worked what she described as "80-hour-weeks" while appearing on Six Feet Under and Brothers & Sisters.

In November 2013, The Sydney Morning Herald reported that Griffiths was to play Julia Gillard in a television drama based on the book, The Stalking of Julia Gillard by Kerry-Anne Walsh. But the project stalled as the proposal for the film was rejected by the Australian television networks.

In 2015, she made her debut as a television director when she directed three episodes of the second series of the Australian teen drama Nowhere Boys.

In 2016, Griffiths was cast opposite Guy Pearce and Mary-Louise Parker in the American miniseries When We Rise, a docudrama focusing on LGBT rights, in which she portrays a nurse during the HIV/AIDS epidemic in the United States. The same year, she appeared in a supporting part opposite Hugo Weaving in the Mel Gibson-directed war drama Hacksaw Ridge, which earned her an AACTA nomination for Best Supporting Actress. In 2018, she appears in the SBS thriller miniseries Dead Lucky, which was sold for American distribution to the streaming service SundanceNow in April 2018.

In 2020, Griffiths starred in the Amazon Prime television show, The Wilds, as Gretchen Klein.

In 2023, Griffiths was announced as the lead role for New Zealand comedy-drama series Madam.

In 2024, Griffiths appeared in the final season of ABC political drama Total Control, after appearing in the two previous seasons, she also served as executive producer on the 3 series show..

In September 2026, Griffiths was announced to star in Wentworth spinoff, Wentworth: Halfway Home set to air later the same year.

== Other ventures ==
In 2017, Griffiths worked promoting the "No Robe" campaign for the Art Series Hotels, which invited hotel guests to pose for nude portraits in their rooms and have them brought to life by artists. She also serves on the board of the Sydney Contemporary art fair.

== Personal life ==
Griffiths married Australian artist Andrew Taylor on 31 December 2002 in the chapel of her high school, Star of the Sea College, in Melbourne. In 2003, she and Taylor had a son, followed by a daughter in 2005. In 2009, she gave birth to her third child in Los Angeles; Griffiths suffered a ruptured uterus giving birth. She spent a total of three days undergoing surgery and recovered from the condition.

In 2002, Griffiths stated she was an atheist. However, in a 2015 interview, she revealed she was again a practising Catholic, the faith in which she was raised. In 2017, she spoke out in favour of same-sex marriage in Australia. She has also supported the Global Charter of Basic Rights campaign for Oxfam Australia. She considers herself a feminist.

After having lived and worked in the United States for nearly a decade while appearing on the series Six Feet Under and Brothers & Sisters, Griffiths returned to live in her native Australia in 2012. Griffiths became a Member of the Order of Australia in the Australia Day Honours in 2020.

== Filmography ==
=== Film ===
| Year | Title | Role | Notes |
|---|---|---|---|
| 1994 | Muriel's Wedding | Rhonda Epinstall | |
| 1996 | Così | Lucy | |
| 1996 | Jude | Arabella | |
| 1996 | Children of the Revolution | Anna | |
| 1996 | To Have & to Hold | Kate | |
| 1997 | Welcome to Woop Woop | Sylvia | |
| 1997 | My Son the Fanatic | Bettina/Sandra | |
| 1997 | My Best Friend's Wedding | Samantha Newhouse | |
| 1998 | Among Giants | Gerry | |
| 1998 | Hilary and Jackie | Hilary du Pré | |
| 1998 | Amy | Tanya Rammus | |
| 1998 | Divorcing Jack | Lee Cooper | |
| 1999 | Me Myself I | Pamela Drury | |
| 2001 | Very Annie Mary | Annie Mary Pugh | |
| 2001 | Blow | Ermine Jung | |
| 2001 | Blow Dry | Sandra | |
| 2002 | The Rookie | Lorri Morris | |
| 2002 | The Hard Word | Carol | |
| 2002 | The Adventures of Tom Thumb and Thumbelina | Albertine Sparrow | Voice |
| 2003 | Ned Kelly | Susan Scott | |
| 2006 | Step Up | Director Gordan | |
| 2009 | Beautiful Kate | Sally | |
| 2011 | Burning Man | Miriam | |
| 2012 | Butterflies | Claire | Voice, short film |
| 2013 | Patrick | Matron Cassidy | |
| 2013 | Saving Mr. Banks | Helen "Ellie" Morehead | |
| 2016 | Mammal | Margaret | |
| 2016 | Hacksaw Ridge | Bertha Doss | |
| 2016 | The Osiris Child: Science Fiction Volume One | General Lynex | |
| 2017 | Don't Tell | Joy Conolly | |
| 2022 | The King's Daughter | Abbess | Filmed in 2014 |
| 2023 | Anyone But You | Innie | |
| 2023 | Bring Him to Me | Veronica | |

=== Television ===
| Year | Title | Role | Notes |
|---|---|---|---|
| 1993–1994 | Secrets | Sarah Foster | Main role, 13 episodes |
| 1994 | Jimeoin | Various | Recurring role, 8 episodes |
| 1995 | Police Rescue | Shelley | 1 episode |
| 1998 | Since You've Been Gone | Sally Zalinsky | Television film |
| 2001–2005 | Six Feet Under | Brenda Chenowith | Main role, 60 episodes |
| 2004 | Plainsong | Maggie Jonas | Television film |
| 2005 | Angel Rodriguez | Nicole | Television film |
| 2006–2011 | Brothers & Sisters | Sarah Walker | Main role, 109 episodes |
| 2008 | Comanche Moon | Inez Scull | Miniseries, 3 episodes |
| 2010 | Rake | Eddie Langhorn | 1 episode |
| 2012 | Underground: The Julian Assange Story | Christine Assange | Television film |
| 2013 | Paper Giants: Magazine Wars | Dulcie Boling | Miniseries, 2 episodes |
| 2013 | Camp | MacKenzie Granger | Main role, 10 episodes |
| 2014 | House Husbands | Belle | Main role, 7 episodes |
| 2016 | Indian Summers | Sirene | 3 episodes |
| 2016 | Barracuda | Samantha Taylor | 4 episodes |
| 2017 | When We Rise | Diane Jones | Miniseries, 4 episodes |
| 2018 | Dead Lucky | Grace Gibbs | Miniseries, 4 episodes |
| 2019–2021, 2024 | Total Control | Rachel Anderson | Main role, 18 episodes |
| 2020 | The Wilds | Gretchen Klein | Main role, 18 episodes |
| 2021 | Aftertaste | Margot | Main role, 12 episodes |
| 2022 | Bali 2002 | Dr Fiona Wood | Miniseries, 4 episodes |
| 2024 | Madam | McKenzie Leigh | Main role: 10 episodes |
| 2026- | Wentworth: Halfway Home | Moira | TV series |

=== Video game ===
| Year | Title | Role |
|---|---|---|
| 2005 | The Suffering: Ties That Bind | Jordan |

=== As director ===
| Year | Title | Notes |
|---|---|---|
| 1998 | Tulip | Short film, Also writer |
| 2015 | Nowhere Boys | Series 2, 3 episodes |
| 2019 | Ride Like a Girl | Also producer |

== Stage credits ==
| Year | Title | Role | Notes | Ref. |
|---|---|---|---|---|
| 1987 | Macbett | | Victoria College Rusden Campus Drama | |
| 1988 | Two Gentlemen of Verona | | Victoria College Rusden Campus Drama | |
| 1988 | The Inspector | | Victoria College Rusden Campus Drama | |
| 1989 | A Chaste Maid in Cheapside | | Victoria College Rusden Campus Drama | |
| 1990 | A Fantasy in Three Dreams | | Victoria College Rusden Campus Drama | |
| 1991 | Skin Deep | | Victoria College Rusden Campus Drama | |
| 1991 | Barbie Gets Hip | | Also writer, one-woman show performed at Melbourne Fringe Festival | |
| 1992 | Wednesday | | With theatre group The Woolly Jumpers, Melbourne | |
| 1994 | The Grapes of Wrath | | Melbourne Theatre Company | |
| 1994 | The Sisters Rosensweig | | Melbourne Theatre Company | |
| 1996–97 | Sylvia | Sylvia | Melbourne Theatre Company | |
| 1998 | A Doll's House | Nora | Melbourne Theatre Company | |
| 2002 | Proof | Catherine | Melbourne Theatre Company | |
| 2011–12 | Other Desert Cities | Brooke Wyeth | Broadway debut, 261 performances | |
| 2012 | 8 | | Exclusive two night-run, readings in Melbourne and Sydney | |

== Awards and nominations ==
Griffiths has received nominations for multiple awards. In 1994, her role in the comedy-drama film Muriel's Wedding (1994) saw her nominated for the AACTA Award for Best Actress in a Supporting Role. She received an additional five AACTA nominations: three for Best Actress in a Leading Role for Amy (1997), Me Myself I (2000) and The Hard Word (2002); and two more for Best Actress in a Supporting Role for Beautiful Kate (2009) and Hacksaw Ridge (2016). Of these six nominations, she won two awards: Best Actress in a Supporting Role for Muriel's Wedding and Best Actress in a Supporting Role for Beautiful Kate.

Achieving further success overseas, Griffiths was nominated for the Academy Award for Best Supporting Actress in 1999 for her role in the biographical film Hilary and Jackie (1998). This performance made her the seventh Australian woman to be nominated for an Academy Award in an acting category. She has also been nominated for two BAFTA Awards, four Golden Globe Awards (winning one for Six Feet Under), four Primetime Emmy Awards and six Screen Actors Guild Awards (winning two for Six Feet Under).
