= Outside of Me =

2002 single by Killing Heidi

Single by Killing Heidi

from the album Present
- B-side: "Buttup"; "Taxi Driver"; "Wartorn Way"
- Released: 23 September 2002
- Length: 4:31
- Label: Wah Wah; Columbia
- Songwriter(s): Ella Hooper; Jesse Hooper
- Producer(s): Paul Kosky

Killing Heidi singles chronology
"Heavensent" (2001)	"Outside of Me" (2002)	"I Am" (2004)

"Outside of Me" is a song by Australian band Killing Heidi. It was the second and final single released from their second album, Present (2002). The single is available in two parts, with the same track listing but slightly different artwork. "Outside of Me" was released on 23 September 2002 and peaked at number 12 on the Australian Singles Chart.

== Track listing ==
Australian CD single

1. "Outside of Me"
2. "Buttup"
3. "Taxi Driver"
4. "Wartorn Way"
5. "Heavensent"

== Charts ==
=== Weekly charts ===
Chart (2002)	Peak position
Australia (ARIA)	12

== Certification ==
Region	Certification	Certified units/sales
Australia (ARIA)	Gold	35,000^{^}
^{^} Shipments figures based on certification alone.
