= Charlie Chan (composer) =

Australian pianist/composer

- Born: Maryann Sook Kim Chan; Melbourne, Australia
- Genres: Jazz, classical, improvisation, world-music
- Occupations: Musician, Composer, improvisation, world-music
- Instruments: Piano; Guitar; Double Bass; Drums
- Years active: 1982–present
- Labels: Sony Masterworks; Martian Music; Charlie Chan Music
- Website: charliechan.com.au

Charlie Chan, born Maryann Sook Kim Chan, is an Australian pianist and composer. They are co-founder and artistic director of the Global Orchestra, which aims to connects musicians from around the world.

== Early life and education ==
Charlie was born in Melbourne to a Chinese-Malay father and Scottish-Australian mother, growing up in Dandenong.

Their first instruments were ukulele, guitar, and drums, starting a band at age eight. At 12, they began work experience in a local Yamaha music store and began playing piano, then double bass. At 14, they began work as a music copyist for Young Talent Time. At 15, they began studying music at University High School and composing for the stage, including the score for a theatrical adaptation of They Shoot Horses Don't They?

== Career ==
Chan moved to Sydney at 16, finding commissioned work with drama and dance groups plus stints playing keyboards and drums with successful bands Electric Pandas, The Allniters and the Stray Dags.

In the 1990s, Chan released three solo albums on their own label in partnership with Sony Masterworks: The Adventures of Charlie Chan (1993), East and West (1996) and Wild Swans (1998). They also opened for Deep Forest on an Australian tour.

In the early to mid 2000s, Chan expanded their own label, Martian Music, into am independent online music service. They continued to release solo albums throughout the 2000s.

They have composed for film and TV soundtracks, including that of Me Myself I, McLeod's Daughters and Killing Time.

Chan is co-founder and artistic director of the Global Orchestra, which aims to connects musicians from around the world, as well as the Museful Live series, released on YouTube during the COVID-19 lockdowns in 2020.

In 2023, Chan released Constellation, a series of 52 albums released one per week throughout the year.

== Personal life ==
Chan is non-binary, and a lesbian.

== Recognition ==
Chan was awarded Best Music Performance at the Melbourne Fringe Festival in 1997, and has also been nominated for two Australasian Performing Right Association Awards for Best Music for a Television Series and Best Film Score.

In 2001, Chan was nominated in two categories in the APRA Music Awards: Best Film Score, for Me Myself I, and Best Television Theme, for Last Warriors.

They have also received three Australian Guild of Screen Composers nominations for Best Soundtrack Album, Best Music for a Feature Film, and Best Music for a Documentary.

== Album discography ==
- The Selected Works of Charlie Chan (1990)
- Transmission (1990)
- A Prologue to the Adventures of... (1993)
- The Adventures of Charlie Chan (1993)
- Music from the New World (1996)
- Paradise Remixes (1996)
- East and West (1996)
- Dreamsounds (1997)
- Wild Swans (1998)
- All Our Loving (1998)
- Charlie Chan Piano (2007)
- Charlie Chan Christmas (2009)
- Music for Film, Television and Dance (2010)
- Constellation (a set of 52 albums, released once a week for a year) (2023)

== Soundtracks ==
- Billion Dollar Crop (Documentary) (1994)
- Through Children's Eyes (Documentary) (1993)
- Great Train Journeys (TV series) (1996) - (Great Railway Journeys (1996)??)
- Me Myself I (1998)
- The Last Warriors (TV series) (1999)
- Starting from Zero (Documentary) (2000)
- Stings, Fangs and Spines (TV series) (2000–2001)
- Chinese Take Away (Documentary) (2002)
- Bizarre Births (Documentary) (1996)
- Mystery of the Skull (Documentary) (2002)
- McLeod's Daughters (2001)
- Australian Story (2006–2010)
- Addiction (TV series) (2010)
- Persons of Interest (TV series) (2011)
- Killing Time (2011)
- Love to Share Food (TV series) (2012)
- Tales of the Unexpected (TV series) (2014)
- Museful Live (Web Series) (2021)
