= I Am (Killing Heidi song) =

2004 single by Killing Heidi

Single by Killing Heidi

from the album Killing Heidi
- B-side: "Fresh Air"
- Released: 12 July 2004
- Studio: Bakehouse (Melbourne, Australia)
- Length: 3:26
- Label: Wah Wah
- Songwriter(s): Ella Hooper, Jesse Hooper, Warren Jenkin, Adam Pedretti
- Producer(s): John Travis

Killing Heidi singles chronology
"Outside of Me" (2002)	"I Am" (2004)	"Calm Down" (2004)

"I Am" is a song by Australian rock band Killing Heidi, written by Ella Hooper, Jesse Hooper, Warren Jenkin and Adam Pedretti and produced by John Travis for the band's third album, Killing Heidi (2004). The song was written in Los Angeles after "a couple of gross guys wolf-whistled" at the lead singer, Hooper, while she was walking down the street.

Released on 12 July 2004, "I Am" became the band's fifth top-20 single in Australia, peaking at number 16, and also was included on the Australian soundtrack to the 2004 superhero film Spider-Man 2. The song remained in the Australian top 50 for 11 weeks, eventually selling over 35,000 copies and achieving gold status.

== Background ==
"I Am" was included on the Australian version of the soundtrack to Spider-Man 2. Columbia Tristar Films' Suzanne Stretton-Brown stated: "We were thrilled to have a rare opportunity to support an Australian band on the Spider-Man 2 soundtrack and when we heard Killing Heidi's new single 'I Am' we were astonished by how beautifully their lyrics seemed to capture the emotion of the character Peter Parker in the new movie. The song expresses an isolation that mirrors Spider-Man's lonely quest and burning inner conflict in the continuing story."

== Music video ==
The music video was directed by Michael Spiccia in Sydney, Australia, features scenes from the Spider-Man 2 2004 film and was released to Australian music channels on 3 July 2004. The band's bass player, Warren Jenkin, stated: "The video is a destroyed New York street scene, after Doc Ock and Spider-Man have had a fight. The whole thing is totally demolished, and there's lots of Marvel comic skyscraper-style backdrops, which looks fantastic. It really looks like it's in New York."

A second version of the music video, which does not contain any movie clips was included on the Australian DVD release of Spider-Man 2.

== Track listing ==
Australian CD single

1. "I Am" – 3:27
2. "Fresh Air" – 3:26
3. "I Am" (Lukas Burton remix) – 3:36

== Charts ==
=== Weekly charts ===
Chart (2004)	Peak position
Australia (ARIA)	16

=== Year-end chart ===
Chart (2004)	Position
Australia (ARIA)	100

== Certification ==
Region	Certification	Certified units/sales
Australia (ARIA)	Gold	35,000^{^}
^{^} Shipments figures based on certification alone.
