= Jessica Orcsik =

Australian actor

- Born: 14 March 1984 (age 42)
- Occupations: Actor, director, producer
- Years active: 1988 – present
- Family: Paula Duncan (mother); John Orcsik (father); Carmen Duncan (aunt); Donald MacDonald (actor, presenter, screenwriter, novelist) (cousin)

Jessica 'Jess' Orcsik, (born 14 February 1984) is an Australian actor, director and producer.

== Early life ==
Orcsik is the daughter of Australian actors Paula Duncan and John Orcsik, who met while working together as an on-screen couple in Cop Shop.

Duncan, who suffered from ovarian cysts, had been told she would never have children, but on Valentine's Day 1984, she gave birth to Orcsik after a 48-hour labour and emergency caesarean. There was much attention surrounding her birth, with magazines vying for exclusive rights to the story. At only a day old, she featured in her first magazine article entitled "A Star Is Born", complete with photos of her mother holding her in the hospital.

Orcsik undertook acting classes at her father's theatre school, The Australian Playhouse Studio (TAPS) in the 1990s, where she studied Shakespeare, voice and theatre. She then went on to train at her father's film and television school.

== Career ==
Orcsik is an actress and award-winning filmmaker who has worked in television, film, theatre and music videos for over 35 years. She began her professional career at the age of 4, with a part on short-lived 1988 Australian TV soap opera Richmond Hill, opposite her mother, Paula Duncan. They also appeared together in various television commercials, soap opera Home and Away, and her father's television film Academy (1996), based on a true story about their family and how her father's film & TV school TAFTA began.

She appeared as Credit Girl in Me, Myself, I in 2000. Then at the age of 19, she scored a part as a dancer on the 2005 film Son of the Mask. Impressed with her performance, the choreographers helped her get her O1 Visa to the US, upon which she moved to Los Angeles. She appeared in a pilot called The High Life by Jeff Shakoor the writer of Bloodline, and had other small television roles, but found herself disheartened by knockbacks and returned to Australia where she opened a performing arts school at the age of 22.

Orcsik ultimately returned to the States, to train at Broadway Dance Center in New York, before moving to LA to run The American Arts Film & Television Academy (AAFTA) – an extension of The Australian Film & Television Academy (TAFTA), founded in 1994 by her parents. She is the director of her production company, J.O. International Productions and was director of Sydney-based performing company, J.O. Studios, which closed in 2013. She also runs production company Diversity Entertainment/Diversity Pictures.

Orcsik has produced and directed over 30 projects, including A Death Perspective, Enigma and 2020 feature film Unsound, the latter of which has streamed on Netflix. She also starred in the film alongside her mother. She has produced numerous events and shows including On Broadway and Don't Dis Disabilities Dance Extravaganza.

== Awards ==
Orcsik has won numerous awards, including Best Female Director at Cannes Film Festival and Best Director at Los Angeles Film Awards for Starry Eyed. Her feature film Reverie was a semi-finalist at Scriptapoolooza and Your Script Produced.

She won a Hollywood Fringe Festival Encore Producers Award for the Australian play Dead Skin. The play was also nominated for Best International Play and Best Drama in 2022.

== Personal life and philanthropy ==
Orcsik married fellow actor Robbie Ryde in California in 2021 and the pair were due to have a baby in the spring of 2023.

Orcsik has been heavily involved in philanthropy and event management working with Special Olympics and LifeForce: Suicide Prevention. Alongside her mother, she is also an ambassador for the Focus on Ability International Short Film Festival, which showcases films about people living with disabilities.

In 2022, she opened the Carmen Duncan Scholarship, in honour of her aunt, actress Carmen Duncan, who lost her life to cancer in 2019. The scholarship provides launchpads for Australian actors in the U.S. market, while creating awareness around women in the industry and gynaecological cancer.

== Acting credits ==
=== Film ===
Year	Title	Role	Notes
2000	Me Myself I	Credit Girl	Feature film
2004	Cocktail Hour	Danni	Short film
2005	Son of the Mask	Dancer	Feature film
2008	The High Life	Girl Writer	Short film
2016	Wings	Miss Willis	Short film
2017	Zelos	Belinda (blonde on beach)	Feature film
2019	A Death Perspective	Leah Barath	Short film
2019	Pass	Jackie	Short film
2020	Unsound	Constable Jill Greene	Feature film
TBA	Fallen	TBA	Post-production
TBA	Reverie	Dr Devon Brooks	Pre-production

=== Television ===
Year	Title	Role	Notes
1988	Richmond Hill	Georgie Perez	3 episodes
1992	Academy	Natalie Steele	TV movie
1997	Home and Away	May	1 episode
2008	The High Life	Girl Writer	TV movie
2017	Soil	Emily Cooper	TV movie

== Writer / director / producer credits ==
=== Film ===
Year	Title	Role	Notes
2018	Stepping Into Focus – A Real Story	Writer / Producer	Short film
2019	VeeBees	Director / Writer / Producer	Short film
2019	A Death Perspective	Writer / Director / Producer	Short film
2019	Banana Split	Executive Producer	Short film
2019	Pass	Executive Producer	Short film
2020	Unsound	Associate Producer	Feature film
2020	Vulture	Production Assistant	Short film
2021	Magic	Executive Producer / Script Editor	Short film
2021	Killer Theory	Writer	Short film
2022	Hangman	Writer	Short film
2022	Enigma	Writer / Director / Executive Producer	Short film
2022	After Roe Falls	Writer / Director / Executive Producer	Short film
2022	The Five Stages	Writer / Executive Producer	Short film
2022	Starry Eyed	Director / Production Designer / Executive Producer	Short film
2022	Mercy	Writer / Director / Producer	Short film
2022	Expired Ethnic	Executive Producer	Short film
2022	People Holes	Executive Producer	Short film
2022	A Girl Meets a Boy	Executive Producer / Script Editor	Short film
2023	Cherry	Writer / Director / Executive Producer	Short film
2023	You're So Vain	Writer / Director / Executive Producer	Short film
2023	The Final Curtain Call	Writer / Director / Executive Producer	Short film
2023	Sariah	Director / Executive Producer	Short film
2023	4th Wave Fem	Executive Producer / Script Editor	Short film
2024	The Poppy Club	Director / Executive Producer / Production Designer	Short film
2025	The Pot	Writer / Director / Producer	Short film
2025	Dead Broke	Writer / Director / Producer	Short film
2025	Anemoia	Writer / Director / Producer / Costumer / Casting	Short film
2025	Asfur	Writer / Director / Producer	Short film
2025	First Moon	Casting Director	Feature film
2025	High Stakes	Executive Producer	Short film
2025	Injected	Executive Producer	Short film
	Locked In	Script Editor	Short film
TBA	The Con	Director / Writer / Executive Producer	Short film – Completed
TBA	Behind Our Scars	Script Editor	Short film – Completed
TBA	1977	Director / Producer	Short film – Post-production
TBA	Spiral	Director / Writer / Screenplay / Creator / Producer	Pre-production
TBA	For Charlie	Director / Writer / Executive Producer	Short film – Pre-production
TBA	Reverie	Writer / Executive Producer	Pre-production
TBA	But I'm Not an Atheist	Writer / Executive Producer	Short film – Pre-production
TBA	Daughters of the Revolution	Director / Writer	In development

=== Television ===
Year	Title	Role	Notes
2025	Operation: Cold Pizza	Director / Writer / Producer	TV series, 2 episodes
2025	Queens of the Desert	Executive Producer	TV series, 1 episode
