= The Hard Word =

2002 Australian crime film

- Theatrical release poster
- Directed by: Scott Roberts
- Written by: Scott Roberts
- Produced by: Al Clark
- Starring: Guy Pearce; Rachel Griffiths; Robert Taylor; Joel Edgerton
- Cinematography: Brian J. Breheny
- Edited by: Martin Connor
- Music by: David Thrussell
- Distributed by: Roadshow Entertainment (Australia); Lions Gate Entertainment (US)
- Release date: 30 June 2002
- Running time: 102 minutes
- Countries: Australia; United Kingdom
- Language: English

The Hard Word (released in some regions as The Australian Job) is a 2002 Australian crime film about three bank-robbing brothers who are offered a role in a bold heist while serving time in prison. The film was written and directed by Scott Roberts, and stars Guy Pearce and Rachel Griffiths.

== Plot ==
The plot centers around three brothers, sophisticated armed robbers led by the shrewd Dale, who work with their long-time lawyer, Frank, and corrupt police to pull off the biggest heist in Australian history. Matters become complicated when Dale begins to realise that while he has been in jail his wife, Carol, has been sleeping with Frank, who has schemes of his own.

The major heist is a reworking of the 1976 Great Bookie Robbery, with a number of variations, including the murders of several people.

== Cast ==
- Guy Pearce as Dale
- Rachel Griffiths as Carol
- Robert Taylor as Frank Malone
- Joel Edgerton as Shane
- Damien Richardson as Mal
- Rhonda Findleton as Jane
- Kate Atkinson as Pamela
- Vince Colosimo as Kelly
- Paul Sonkkila as O'Riordan
- Kym Gyngell as Paul
- Dorian Nkono as Tarzan
- Don Bridges as Doug
- Greg Fleet as Tony
- Beth Buchanan as Nurse
- Louise Crawford as Waitress #1
- Nash Edgerton as Bank Guard

== Box office ==
The Hard Word grossed $2,957,456 at the box office in Australia.

== Reception ==
On review aggregator website Rotten Tomatoes, the film holds an approval rating of 38% based on 79 reviews, with an average rating of 5.7/10.

== Butcher talk ==
A few times butcher talk ("rehctub klat") is spoken. At those times hard-coded subtitles are used.
