= Reflector (Killing Heidi album) =

Studio album by Killing Heidi
- Released: 10 March 2000; 27 November 2000 (bonus disc)
- Recorded: June−September 1999
- Genre: Rock
- Length: 42:22
- Label: Wah-Wah, Roadshow, 3:33
- Producer: Paul Kosky

Killing Heidi chronology
Reflector (2000)	Present (2002)

Singles from Reflector
- 1. "Weir" Released: 10 May 1999; 2. "Mascara" Released: 11 October 1999; 3. "Live Without It" Released: 3 April 2000; 4. "Superman/Supergirl" Released: 18 September 2000

Professional ratings
Review scores
Source	Rating
AllMusic	2/5 stars

Reflector is the debut album by Australian band Killing Heidi, released in 2000 by Roadshow Music. It won the 2000 ARIA Music Award for Best Rock Album.

== Album information ==
The album was an enormous success, propelling the band to prominence and eventually spending seven weeks at No. 1 on the ARIA charts. It eventually went 5× Platinum in Australia (selling over 350,000 copies) and won the ARIA Award for Album of the Year at the ARIA Music Awards of 2000.

Upon its release in early 2000, Reflector became the fastest-selling album in Australian music history. Reflector spawned four hit singles: "Weir" (which peaked at No. 6 on the national charts in 1999), "Mascara" (the band's first No. 1 single), "Live Without It" (No. 5), and "Superman Supergirl" (No. 57)

== Track listing ==
All tracks are written by Jesse and Ella Hooper.

No.	Title	Length
1.	"Mascara"	4:50
2.	"Weir"	4:04
3.	"Superman/Supergirl"	3:35
4.	"Astral Boy"	3:08
5.	"Leave Me Alone"	3:28
6.	"You Don't Know"	3:02
7.	"A Jar Labelled Small"	4:25
8.	"Class Celebrities"	2:42
9.	"Live Without It"	3:11
10.	"Real People"	3:15
11.	"Jon's Song"	4:19
12.	"Black Sheep"	2:18

Deluxe edition bonus disc
No.	Title	Length
1.	"Intro"
2.	"Kettle"
3.	"Real People"
4.	"Live Without It"
5.	"You Don't Know"
6.	"Weir"
7.	"Mascara"
8.	"Superstar"
9.	"A Jar Labelled Small"
10.	"Talkback Interview"
11.	"Superman/Supergirl (four-piece acoustic live version for Triple M)"

CD-ROM features
No.	Title	Length
1.	"Weir (USA music video)"
2.	"Superman/Supergirl (music video)"
3.	"Interview and information with Courteney Cox"

== Awards and nominations ==
=== Awards ===
- 2000 ARIA Awards, Album of the Year for Reflector
- 2000 ARIA Awards, Best Group for Reflector
- 2000 ARIA Awards, Breakthrough Artist – Album for Reflector
- 2000 ARIA Awards, Best Rock Album for Reflector

=== Nominations ===
- 2000 ARIA Awards, Single of the Year for "Mascara" (lost to Madison Avenue's "Don't Call Me Baby")
- 2000 ARIA Awards, Highest Selling Album for Reflector (lost to Savage Garden's Affirmation)
- 2000 ARIA Awards, Best Cover Art (by Paul Kosky) for Reflector (lost to Janet English's art for Spiderbait's single "Glokenpop")
- 2001 ARIA Awards, Best Group for "Superman/Supergirl" (lost to Powderfinger's Odyssey Number Five)
- 2001 ARIA Awards, Producer of the Year (Paul Kosky) for "Superman/Supergirl" (lost to Bobbydazzler for The Avalanches' album Since I Left You)

== Charts ==
=== Weekly charts ===
Chart (2000–01)	Peak position
Australian Albums (ARIA)	1
New Zealand Albums (RMNZ)	19

=== Year-end charts ===
Chart (2000)	Position
Australian Albums (ARIA)	5

== Certifications ==
Region	Certification	Certified units/sales
Australia (ARIA)	4× Platinum	280,000^{^}
^{^} Shipments figures based on certification alone.
