= Heavensent =

2001 single by Killing Heidi

Single by Killing Heidi

from the album Present
- Released: 10 December 2001
- Length: 4:31
- Label: Wah Wah, Columbia
- Songwriters: Ella Hooper, Jesse Hooper
- Producer: Paul Kosky

Killing Heidi singles chronology
"Superman Supergirl" / "Black Sheep" (2000)	"Heavensent" (2001)	"Outside of Me" (2002)

"Heavensent" is the first single released from Australian rock band Killing Heidi's second album, Present (2002). The song reached number 28 on the Australian Singles Chart.

== Awards and nominations ==
Awards and nominations for "Bloke"
Year	Nominee / work	Award	Result
2002	"Heavensent"	Best Independent Release	Nominated

== Track listing ==
CD single

1. "Heavensent" (radio mix)
2. "Heavensent" (Psy Harmonics remix—radio edit)
3. "Up & Down" (live in Violet Town)
4. "What You Say I'll Do" (live in Violet Town)
5. "Nutha F..ken Love Song" (live in Violet Town)
6. "Heavensent" (Psy Harmonics remix—full version)

== Chart performance ==
"Heavensent" debuted on the Australian ARIA Singles Chart at 31 on 16 December 2001. In its fifth week, it peaked at 28. It then stayed in the top 50 for a further two weeks.

=== Weekly charts ===
Chart (2002)	Peak position
Australia (ARIA)	28

== Certifications ==
Region	Certification	Certified units/sales
Australia (ARIA)	Gold	35,000^{^}
^{^} Shipments figures based on certification alone.

== Release history ==
Region	Date	Format(s)	Label(s)	Ref.
Australia	10 December 2001	CD	Wah Wah; Columbia	
New Zealand	18 March 2002	CD	Wah Wah; Columbia	
