= John Orcsik =

Australian actor

- Born: 3 May 1945 (age 81); Austria
- Occupations: Actor; screenwriter; director; producer
- Years active: 1966- present
- Spouse: Paula Duncan (m. 1982; div. 1998)
- Family: Jessica Orcsik

John Orcsik (born 3 May 1945), credited also variously as Jon Orcsik, John Orschik, John Orscik and John Crosik, is an Australian television and film actor, screenwriter, director and producer, known for his television roles starting from the late 1960s, he is best known for his roles in Cop Shop TV series as Detective Mike Georgiou and Paradise Beach but also for the film version of the soap opera Number 96. He was married to actress Paula Duncan.

== Early life ==
Orcsik was born on 3 May 1945 in Austria to refugee parents is of Hungarian descent. He was raised and educated in Perth, Western Australia In his teens, he began training in amateur theatre, including playing Biff Loman in Death of a Salesman.

In his early years, he was also a bodybuilder and karate student, and owned and operated a horse riding school in Western Australia. His horse riding skills later coming in handy for television roles in Ben Hall and Tandarra.

Orcsik moved to Sydney to further his acting career.

== Career ==
After relocating to Sydney, Orcsik scored his first job within three weeks, after auditioning for the lead role in a play called The Knack, alongside Jacki Weaver. The production toured to Tasmania. In 1989, he auditioned and was accepted into the Melbourne Theatre Company, where he spent over two years as a contract actor. His agent then encouraged him to return to Sydney, to begin working in film and television.

Orcsik made his screen debut appearing in the rural drama soap opera Bellbird. In 1967, he played various guest roles in the Crawford Productions police dramas Homicide, Division 4 and Matlock Police.

He had a role in television series Number 96 in 1972, and subsequently reprised the role in the feature film version of the serial, in 1973. He later briefly reappeared in the same series, late in its run, playing a different character, this time credited as 'John Crosik'. He also appeared in 1974 film Petersen, and played a minor role in 1975 action film The Man from Hong Kong.

After roles in other Crawford Productions programs, Bluey (1976) and The Sullivans, and an appearance in Chopper Squad (1978), in 1978 Orcsik joined new Crawfords police series Cop Shop early in its run as Detective Mike Georgiou. He had been brought in to replace Tony Bonner but ended up becoming one of the main cast members. He continued in the role until the end of the series in December 1983.

After Cop Shop ended, Orcsik worked as a television scriptwriter, contributing several scripts to the series Prisoner. He also continued acting and throughout the 1980s. He played several roles in television movies and miniseries, including Harvest of Hate (1979), The Hijacking of the Achille Lauro (1989), Displaced Persons (1984), Dadah Is Death (aka A Long Way from Home, 1988) and Kokoda Crescent (1989). Other credits of the 1980s included television series Mission: Impossible (1988) and the film The Edge of Power (1987). With his swarthy Mediterranean appearance, Orcsik was cast as Middle Eastern characters in many of these productions.

He also had roles in such Australian television series such as Zoo Family (1985), Home and Away (1992), Paradise Beach (1993), Lift Off (1995), Pacific Drive (1996), and Medivac (1997). He directed the 1996 TV movie Academy.

Orcsik's later acting appearances include a cameo role as a doctor in miniseries The Day of the Roses (1998) and a recurring role in serial Neighbours (1999–2002), as well as parts in Stingers (2000), Blue Heelers (2002), MDA (2002), The Saddle Club (2003), Always Greener (2002; 2003), Scooter: Secret Agent (2005).

He also appeared in the 2011 TV movie Underbelly Files: The Man Who Got Away. In 2019, he played the gypsy leader, Alexandru Draghici in "Sorrow Song", a season 5 episode of The Doctor Blake Mysteries.

His most recent credits have been Superwog and New Gold Mountain, both in 2021.

After a request by industry professionals in Queensland, John started film and television acting studio The Australian Film & Television Academy (TAFTA) on the Gold Coast in 1994, coaching many actors including Kodi Smit-McPhee. He has since expanded to Melbourne and Sydney and continues to run classes online and in-person.

== Personal life ==
Orcsik first met Paula Duncan in 1973 on the set of Number 96, before going on to star together with her in Cop Shop from 1979, where they fell in love. They were married in June 1982, and their characters married on Cop Shop soon after.

When Duncan fell pregnant in real life, the producers wrote it into the script. Their daughter Jessica Orcsik was born on Valentine's Day 1984. Jessica has since followed in her parents' footsteps and is an actor and producer.

Orcsik and Duncan were married for 19 years, before getting divorced, but are still close friends. They have since acted together in 1990s series Paradise Beach, followed by a television advertisement for 'Sleep Tight', a treatment for snoring and sleep apnea.

== Filmography ==
=== Film ===
Year	Title	Role	Type
1972	The Man Who Shot the Albatross		TV movie
1974	Petersen	Walter	Feature film
1974	Number 96	Simon Carr	Feature film
1975	The Man from Hong Kong	Charles	Feature film
1976	Secret Doors		TV movie
1976	The Trespassers	Cedric	Feature film
1976	Murcheson Creek		TV movie
1976	Do I Have to Kill My Child?	Fang	TV movie
1978	The Death Train	Truck Driver	TV movie
1979	Harvest of Hate	Terrorist	TV movie
1985	Displaced Persons	Miklos	TV movie
1988	A Long Way from Home	Brian Spinnel	TV movie
1989	The Edge of Power	Alex Cahill	Feature film
1989	The Hijacking of the Achille Lauro	Samir Al-quantari	TV movie
1989	Kokoda Crescent	Vince	Feature film
1992	Academy	The Stalker	TV movie
1998	Casino Reef		TV movie
2007	The Condemned	Belarus Warden	
2009	Rex	Jon/John	TV movie
2011	Underbelly Files: The Man Who Got Away	Ferdi Vigani	TV movie
2015	Pawno	Tony Robinson	Feature film
2015	Crime and Punishment	Sutherland	Feature film
2017	The Legend of Ben Hall	John Kelly	Feature film
2018	The BBQ	Hector	Feature film

=== Television ===
Year	Title	Role	Type
1967	Bellbird		TV series
1972	Number 96	Simon Carr	TV series
1972	Behind the Legend		TV series
1973	Boney	Greg Pampino	TV series
1972-74	Matlock Police	5 character roles	TV series
1972-75	Division 4	5 character roles	TV series
1974	Number 96	Simon Carr	TV series
1974-76	Homicide	4 character roles	TV series
1975	Ben Hall	Johnny Gilbert	TV miniseries
1976	Tandarra	Pat Daly	TV miniseries
1977	The Sullivans	Father Mulcahy	TV series
1977	Bluey	Dino Rossi	TV series, 1 episode
1978	Chopper Squad	Dave Evans	TV series
1984	Special Squad	Ted Rafferty	TV series
1978-84	Cop Shop	Det. Mike Georgiou	TV series
1985	Five Mile Creek	Frank Moore	TV series
1985	Zoo Family	Ken Bennett	TV series
1986	The Flying Doctors	Bevan	TV series
1987	A Country Practice	Sam Venuti	TV series
1989	Mission: Impossible	Prince Arcadi	TV series
1991	Boys from the Bush	Angels	TV series
1991	Acropolis Now	Theo	TV series
1991	Chances	Rev. Dwayne Rogers	TV series
1992	Home and Away	Les Bagley	TV series
1993	Paradise Beach	Mr. Jerome	TV series
1994	Time Trax	Nick	TV series
1993-95	G.P.	2 roles	TV series
1996	Pacific Drive	Wes Sandergard	TV series
1997	Medivac	Dr. Cliff Houghhan	TV series
1998	Misery Guts	Mr. Gambaso	TV series
1998	The Day of the Roses	Erica's Doctor	TV miniseries
2000	Stingers	Hughie Papadakis	TV series
2002	Pizza	Agent Sam	TV series
2002	Blue Heelers	Don Carson	TV series
2002	MDA	Bret Intosh	TV series
2003	The Saddle Club	Cawlin	TV series
2003	Always Greener	Mario Linguini	TV series
2005	Scooter: Secret Agent	Masters	TV series
2006	Nightmares and Dreamscapes	Stan the Cop	TV series
2007	Kick	Bokor	TV miniseries
2007	City Homicide	Lyndon Quayle	TV series
2008	All Saints	Warden	TV series
2008	Rush	Dr. Freeman	TV series
2009	Satisfaction	Eric	TV series
2011	Killing Time	Supreme Court Judge	TV miniseries
2013	Australia on Trial	Justice Dowling	TV miniseries
2013	Better Man		TV miniseries
2015	Pawno	Tony Robinson	
2015	Crime and Punishment	Sutherland	
1996-2012	Neighbours	Various	TV series
2017	The Doctor Blake Mysteries	Alexandru Draghici	TV series
2021	Superwog	2 roles	TV series
2021	New Gold Mountain	Gregor	TV miniseries
In production	Bunchie	Alfredo Coglione	TV series

== Theatre ==
=== As actor ===
Year	Title	Role	Type	Ref.
	Birds of a Feather		Playhouse, Perth	
	Hoddle's Remarkable Handcraft		Playhouse, Perth	
	The Cherry Orchard		Playhouse, Perth	
1966	Death of a Salesman	Biff Loman	Patch Theatre, Perth	
1967	Oedipus the King	A Messenger	His Majesty's Theatre, Perth	
1968	The Private Ear	Ted	Playhouse, Perth with National Theatre	
1969	Melodrama Play		PACT Youth Theatre, Sydney	
1969	The Knack		Theatre Royal, Hobart with National Theatre & Fine Arts Society	
1970	Cat Among the Pigeons	Emile / Man	Russell St Theatre, Melbourne, Canberra Theatre with MTC	
1970	Philadelphia, Here I Come!		Russell St Theatre, Melbourne with MTC	
1970	The Caucasian Chalk Circle	First Ironshirt	Russell St Theatre, Melbourne with MTC	
1970	Day of Glory		Russell St Theatre, Melbourne with MTC	
1970	The Devils	Bontemps	Russell St Theatre, Melbourne with MTC	
1970	Son of Man		Russell St Theatre, Melbourne with MTC	
1970	All's Well That Ends Well		Princess Theatre, Melbourne, Canberra Theatre, Octagon Theatre, Perth with MTC	
1970	King Oedipus		Old Tote Parade Theatre, Sydney	
1971	The Government Inspector		Russell St Theatre, Melbourne with MTC	
1971	King Lear		Russell St Theatre, Melbourne with MTC	
1971	The Recruiting Officer		Russell St Theatre, Melbourne with MTC	
1971	The Trial of the Catonsville Nine		Russell St Theatre, Melbourne with MTC	
1971	Galileo		Russell St Theatre, Melbourne, Canberra Theatre with MTC	
1971–1972	The Man Who Shot the Albatross	Lieutenant Minchin	Princess Theatre, Melbourne, Canberra Theatre, Elizabethan Theatre, Sydney, Her Majesty's Theatre, Adelaide with MTC	
1972	The Mad Dog Blues		Paddington Village Theatre, Sydney	
1974	Coralie Lansdowne Says No	Paul	Theatre 62, Adelaide, Nimrod, Sydney	
1976	The Tatty Hollow Story	Rube	Stables Theatre, Sydney	
1976	The Season at Sarsaparilla	First Ambulance Man	Sydney Opera House with Old Tote Theatre, Sydney	
1985–1986	On the Blind Side		Ensemble Theatre, Sydney, Playhouse, Canberra	
1987	The Sunshine Boys		Tour	
1988	Bedroom Farce	Nick	Twelfth Night Theatre, Brisbane, Glen St Theatre, Sydney & NSW regional tour	
1990	Siren	Rob	Melbourne Athenaeum, QPAC, Brisbane, Canberra Theatre	
1994	Caravan		Sydney Opera House with Peter & Ellen Williams	

=== As director ===
Year	Title	Role	Type	Ref.
1969	The Burning of Joan	Director	PACT Youth Theatre, Sydney	
1971	King Lear	Fight Director	Russell St Theatre, Melbourne with MTC	
1993	Hot Taps	Director	Riverside Theatres Parramatta with Parramatta Theatre Company	
	6 O’Clock High	Director	Riverside Theatres Parramatta with Parramatta Theatre Company	
	Blokes Like Him	Director	Riverside Theatres Parramatta with Parramatta Theatre Company	
	Solo Act	Director	Riverside Theatres Parramatta with Parramatta Theatre Company	
	Macbeth	Director	Riverside Theatres Parramatta with Parramatta Theatre Company	
	Tess of the d'Urbervilles	Director	Riverside Theatres Parramatta with Parramatta Theatre Company	
	Dark of the Moon	Director	Riverside Theatres Parramatta with Parramatta Theatre Company	
	The Removalists	Director	Riverside Theatres Parramatta with Parramatta Theatre Company	
	Dodge City	Director	Parramatta RSL Club	

== Notes ==
- TAFTA -Filmography
- Cop Shop
- Marnie Hill: The actors' handbook: a guide to the Australian entertainment industry
