= Overnight Success (Ella Hooper album) =

Studio album by Ella Hooper
- Released: 2 October 2026
- Length: 37:47
- Labels: Ella Hooper, MGM
- Producers: Clare Reynolds, Ella Hooper, Sam Hawksley and Mic Hubbard

Ella Hooper chronology
Live at Fight Night Records (2024)	Overnight Success (2026)

Singles from Overnight Success
- 1. "Growing Up Is Hard to Do" Released: 1 December 2025; 2. "I Got Eyes (On You)" Released: 11 March 2026; 3. "When the Shit Went Down" Released: 7 August 2026; 4. "Cowboy Man" Released: 4 September 2026

Overnight Success is the third solo album by Australian singer-songwriter Ella Hooper. The album was announced in August 2026, along its third single and released on 2 October 2026.

Upon announcement, Hooper said, "I worked really hard on this record, I took risks and fought for things, sent myself broke a few times – making it over multiple trips to Nashville, but also met some incredible talents along the way and I couldn't be more confident and stoked with the end result." Upon release, Hooper said "It covers some ground from musing on my obsession with and adventures in art making, to grief, to growth, to stripping off the last lingering layers of childhood to embrace well, I wouldn't call it maturity; but whatever's next. I hope there’s something in here that touches you, connects with one of your own mirror ball squares and beams a little light back into your day or night."

The album became Hooper's first to enter the ARIA Chart top 50.

== Reception ==
Melody Moko from ABC Country said "Across 11 tracks, Ella brings together shimmering Americana, country-rock swagger, intimate storytelling and her trademark wit, proving once again that she's impossible to pigeonhole."

Justine McNamara from The AU Review gave the album 4 1/2 out of 5 and said "Overnight Success takes us on a long ride through Hooper's mind and heart and offers plenty of insight into what she has been experiencing over the last few years. The light-hearted, more upbeat tracks provide welcome balance to the ballads and the result is a deeply personal collection of work that details universal difficulties we can all relate to."

== Track listing ==
Overnight Success
No.	Title	Writer(s)	Length
1.	"Growing Up is Hard to Do"	Ella Hooper	3:13
2.	"I Got Eyes (On You)"	Hooper; M. Walker	3:41
3.	"Bad Wood"	Hooper	3:06
4.	"Cowboy Man"	Hooper; C. Reynolds	3:37
5.	"Let It Fall"	Hooper; Steve Poltz	3:31
6.	"Slow Morning"	Hooper; S. Douga	3:52
7.	"Just Along for the Ride"	Hooper	3:20
8.	"When the Shit Went Down"	Hooper	2:49
9.	"2B or Not 2B (Light Grey)"	Hooper	2:39
10.	"Die Happy"	Hooper	4:41
11.	"Overnight Success"	Hooper	3:13
Total length:			37:47

== Charts ==
Chart (2026)	Peak position
Australian Albums (ARIA)	19
