= Killing Heidi =

Australian rock band

- Origin: Violet Town, Victoria, Australia
- Genres: Rock, pop, folk
- Years active: 1996–2006, 2016–present
- Labels: Wah-Wah, Roadshow, 3:33, Universal, Columbia
- Members: Ella Hooper; Jesse Hooper; Adam Pedretti; Clio Renner; Lena Nielson
- Past members: Aaron Hart; Rowen Murphy; Brian Walton; Warren Jenkin; James Gilligan; Lena Douglas; Tim Curnick
- Website: https://killingheidiofficial.com/

Killing Heidi are an Australian rock band, formed in Violet Town, Victoria in 1996, initially as a folk-pop duo by siblings Ella and Jesse Hooper. The band has released three studio albums: Reflector (March 2000), which reached No. 1 on the ARIA Albums Chart, Present (October 2002) and Killing Heidi (August 2004). Their top 20 singles are "Weir" (October 1999), "Mascara" (November, No. 1 on ARIA Singles Chart), "Live Without It" (April 2000), "Outside of Me" (September 2002) and "I Am" (July 2004). At the ARIA Music Awards of 2000 they were nominated in seven categories and won four trophies: Album of the Year, Best Group, Breakthrough Artist – Album and Best Rock Album for Reflector. At the APRA Music Awards of 2001 Ella and Jesse Hooper won Songwriter of the Year. The group disbanded in 2006, with Ella and Jesse taking a lower profile with an acoustic folk duo, The Verses. In 2016, it was announced that the band would be reforming to celebrate its 20th anniversary, and the band have continued to tour since.

Outside of the band, Ella also has a career as a solo performer, radio presenter and TV personality. Jesse, meanwhile, has a career as a music teacher, producer and community arts developer.

== History ==
=== Early years (1996–1999) ===
Killing Heidi were formed in Violet Town in 1996 as an acoustic folk duo by siblings, Ella Hooper on lead vocals and her older brother, Jesse Hooper, on lead guitar. Violet Town is a small Victorian country town, about 175 km northeast of Melbourne with a population of 1084 (in 2011), where their parents were music, English and drama teachers.

In 1996 Ella and Jesse played an early gig at the Violet Town Arts Festival, when Ella was 13 years old and Jess was 15. This gig was supported by the future recipient of the 2001 C.A.S Hawker Scholarship and attorney Stephen Michelson. Ella later described their group as an "acoustic, folky duo with an edge." The name, Killing Heidi, came from using two lists, before their first gig: one filled with "soft" words (Heidi was selected), one with "harsh" words (Killing). Ella recalled in January 2015 that the name was "a play on the end of innocence and embracing imperfection": it was chosen to have something to fill in on the Unearthed entry form. Jamie Durrant of Benalla's Bent Records caught the festival gig and offered them time in his recording studio.

With two schoolmates as the rhythm section: Aaron Hart on drums and Rowen Murphy on bass guitar; Killing Heidi recorded "Morning" and "Kettle". These were included on a Bent Records sampler album, Two Bent, with additional tracks by the label's other artists Spudgun, Stealth and Michael Meeking. Killing Heidi also submitted their recordings to the national radio station, Triple J's Unearthed competition in 1996: "Kettle" won the competition for the Goulburn Valley region, in a live broadcast with Jane Gazzo, alongside a track by Stealth. "Kettle" was written by Ella, Jesse and Brian Walton. The group re-recorded the track at ABC's Southbank studios for inclusion on another various artists' album, Triple J Unearthed 4. After winning their section of the Unearthed competition, "Kettle" was placed on high rotation by Triple J.

The group had a gig at the Melbourne Push Over concert in 1996. Paul Kosky, a Melbourne-based engineer-producer, who had worked with Crowded House, Rage Against the Machine, Kate Ceberano, and The Clouds, was looking for a new band to manage and record. Kosky had heard "Kettle" on the radio and decided to check them out at Push Over. In March 2000 Kosky recalled that their rhythm section were musically weak, although the siblings showed "a raw talent I knew could be turned into a global appeal." The group signed to his management company in 1997 and his new recording label, Wah Wah Music (established with US-based investor, Chris Robinson) in the following year. Kosky helped develop the band for two years and, as their manager, arranged a distribution deal with Roadshow Music (which also had a contract with Savage Garden) for his own label.

By the end of 1997 Killing Heidi had acquired a new rhythm section with Warren Jenkin on bass guitar (Rick Price, Merril Bainbridge, Deborah Conway) and Adam Pedretti on drums (ex-Non-Intentional Lifeform aka NIL). Pendretti described his recruitment, "[Kosky] had worked with NIL as producer, so he knew I could play a little bit off the wall... [he] dropped off a Killing Heidi demo and I started learning the songs. It just took off from there." Killing Heidi recorded the rest of their first studio album, Reflector, throughout 1998 and into 1999. According to Australian musicologist, Ian McFarlane, Kosky was "meticulously shaping the band's début album"; he worked as their engineer, producer, talent manager and record label co-owner.

=== Commercial success (1999–2003) ===
In July 1999 Killing Heidi performed at the Grounded Festival and then launched their first national tour. To coincide with the festival gig they issued their début single, "Weir", which eventually reached No. 6 on the ARIA Singles Chart. McFarlane described it as a "winning mix of quiet/loud acoustic/churning electric guitars, adolescent angst and sing-along pop with a funky mid-section." Music journalist Ed Nimmervoll felt it was "a tale of life after high school." It was certified platinum by Australian Recording Industry Association (ARIA) for shipment of 70,000 copies by the end of that year.

The second single "Mascara", about self-image and individuality, was released in November 1999. A five-track maxi-single version, "Mascara"/"Leave Me Alone", followed in January 2000. This version reached the top of the national charts, on 30 January, which was Ella's 17th birthday. It stayed at No. 1 for three weeks, and was certified platinum at the end of that year. "Mascara" was accompanied by a music video, which was directed by Kosky. He recalled, "There was some very straight commercial radio that said, 'We will never play this song,'... I hear that station play it [now] and... We've made a difference, and we've educated them."

Billboard's Christie Eliezer reported that Killing Heidi were one of three "major domestic breakouts" in 1999 in Australia, "all released on independent labels". The other two musical acts were Vanessa Amorosi and Sister2Sister – all three "were still in high school when their records first entered the charts." Eliezer noticed that Killing Heidi had a "flamboyant, outspoken appeal [that] gained pop, rock, and fashion media coverage."

Reflector was released in March 2000 and had a début at No. 1; it spent seven weeks at the top of the ARIA charts. McFarlane opined that it was "one of the most highly anticipated Australian releases in recent years, it was a remarkably assured début, a mix of spirited pop, big rock riffs and adolescent energy." Jon Azpri of AllMusic rated it as two out of five stars, he felt their first two singles were "catchy pop hits with just enough of a grrl-rock edge to mollify young audiences. The rest of the album is all over the map." By the end of 2001, Reflector had shipped over 280,000 copies in Australia, being certified 4× platinum. It provided two further singles: "Live Without It" (April 2000) and "Superman Supergirl" (September). The album also charted on the New Zealand Albums Chart at No. 19 with three of its tracks reaching the related singles chart's top 50.

At the ARIA Music Awards of 2000 held in October, Killing Heidi received seven nominations and won four categories: Album of the Year, Best Group, Breakthrough Artist – Album and Best Rock Album for Reflector. The three other nominees were: Single of the Year for "Mascara", Best Cover Art for Kosky's effort on Reflector and Highest Selling Album for the latter. At the APRA Music Awards of 2001 Ella and Jesse Hooper won Songwriter of the Year. The group "played a handful of club showcases" in the United States by May 2001, with Reflector, appearing in the North American market in March that year. Pendretti opined "It'd be great to break anywhere, but I don’t think we're going to be an overnight success there. I think we've got a lot of hard work to put in, in the states. There's a lot of great bands there."

From mid-2001 the band's momentum was reduced when a cyst was found on Ella's vocal cords and she underwent throat surgery late that year. Her voice was slow to recover, which "destroyed any confidence she had in her voice." In November of the following year she said, "I have a rule – no singing before 10am. Nothing comes out, even if I wanted it to. If I'm on at 10am I have to be up by 8.30am, because it takes a while for my voice to sound human. It's like a croaky 80-year-old lady." The group's official website announced in August 2001 that Wah Wah Music had joined with Sony Music Entertainment Australia for their releases. The band continued to work on its second studio album, Present (October 2002), which peaked at No. 12. It was co-produced by Kosky and Robinson with Andy Baldwyn and issued on Wah Wah Music/Sony Music Australia. It was certified gold for shipment of 35,000 units in December.

Craig Mathieson of The Age saw that Present was "a comparative commercial failure". Peter Holmes of The Sydney Morning Herald described the album, "a dose of punchy, melodic rock embellished with keyboards, strings, horns, scratching and drum loops. Arguably, however, the highlight is 'Sweet', a sunny semi-acoustic singalong."

"Heavensent" (December 2001), the first single from the album, reached the top 30 in early 2002 even though "live promotion for the track was limited" as Ella recovered. She had had problems, "I knew they would push me to sing... They told me the whole project couldn't stop for a year. That much time out was not allowed career-wise. I wanted to say, 'Stop. I know we can do this right, but not now.' But then we went and did it anyway." Its second single, "Outside of Me", which reached a peak of No. 12, appeared in September 2002. A third song from the album, "Ammyl (Say What You Wanna Say)", was a radio-only release in 2003 – not issued as a physical single.

In 2003 Paul Kosky and the band had an "acrimonious" split; which "almost spelt the end" for the band. According to Mathieson "the band were starting to bristle at the extent of Kosky's involvement in every aspect of their stalled career." Kosky felt he was a scapegoat for problems with the second album including its poorer commercial performance: "Everyone was looking for a fall guy. It happened to be me and I left gracefully. I put my life into it for five years and I gambled a lot. Like any relationship, you find a time when you move on." Chris Robinson bought out Kosky's share of their partnership in Wah Wah Music and became the band's new manager.

=== Self-titled album (2003–2005) ===
In late 2003 the band spent three months in Los Angeles recording their third studio album, Killing Heidi. It was produced by John Travis – Mathieson described how "[Travis] proved to be easygoing, and sessions ran much faster because he favoured recording the three instrumentalists playing live and using entire tracks, as opposed to recording each separately and editing together numerous takes to make one technically perfect but often coldly sterile piece." Tim Cashmere of Undercover felt it was "a huge step in their sound and [they] returned with an album that can compete on a worldwide scale... [by] a band growing into its full potential and while they're not quite there yet, they've come a long way, baby!"

Its first single, "I Am", was released in July 2004, which entered the charts at No. 16. It spent three months in the Top 50 and achieved gold certification. It was used on the Australian version of the feature film soundtrack for Spider-Man 2. Matt Holt of Light of the Quasar caught their gig in Traralgon: they were "an effervescent and popular group... their music would be to call it poetically rocking. This band performs stadium rock out songs just as well as ballads."

In late August 2004 the self-titled album appeared with a less styled and more sonically expressive sound. It had a début at No. 7 on the charts, and achieved a gold certification. In September 2004, the second single, "Calm Down", was issued, which reached No. 23. Early in 2005 a third song, "Running Underwater", was released to radio, but not as a physical single and received little radio airplay. Later in 2005 Killing Heidi left Sony BMG.

=== Hiatus (2006–2016) ===
In mid-2006 Killing Heidi's MySpace page described the group as taking a break. In July Andrew Tijs of Undercover.fm News reported that the group had disbanded. The siblings formed a folk duo, the Verses, and started writing and performing new material for that project. Pedretti formed a heavy metal group, Monster Truck Extravaganza; Jenkin returned to work with Merril Bainbridge as well as "generating electronic music with computers, synthesisers and keyboards."

In May 2013 Ella reflected on her time with Killing Heidi and the likelihood of any reunion, "I don't think I could sing such youthful, and youth based songs convincingly any more. It really did just run its natural course and I think it would be very unnatural to start it up again now." Aside from the Verses, Ella has a career as a solo performer, radio presenter and TV personality. Her brother Jesse would go on to a career as a music teacher, producer and community arts developer.

=== Reunion (2016–present) ===
In September 2016 it was announced that Killing Heidi would be reuniting to play a series of shows to celebrate their 20th anniversary. The band would perform at the Handpicked Festival, the Kickstart Summer festival and the Queenscliff Music Festival. Although the Hooper siblings and drummer Adam Pedretti participated in the reunion, bassist Warren Jenkin did not. He was replaced by James Gilligan; with the quartet being joined by keyboardist Lena Douglas.

In February 2017, Killing Heidi appeared at Taronga Zoo, Sydney, as part of the annual "Twilight at Taronga" concert series. This was followed by a national Australian tour in June.

In early 2020, Killing Heidi took part in the Australian-wide Red Hot Summer Tour as one of the major performers.

== Members ==
Current members

- Ella Hooper – lead vocals (1996–2006, 2016–present)
- Jesse Hooper – guitars, backing vocals (1996–2006, 2016–present)
- Adam Pedretti – drums (1996–2006, 2016–present)
- Clio Renner - keyboards, backing vocals (2017–present)
- Phoebe Neilson - bass, backing vocals (2021–present)

Former members

- Aaron Hart – drums & bagpipes (1996)
- Rowen Murphy – bass guitar, guitar (1996)
- Warren Jenkin – bass guitar (1997–2006)
- James Gilligan – bass, backing vocals, violin (2016–2017)
- Lena Douglas – keyboards, backing vocals (2016–2017)
- Tim Curnick - bass, backing vocals (2017–2021)

Timeline

== Awards and nominations ==
=== APRA Awards ===
The APRA Awards are presented annually from 1982 by the Australasian Performing Right Association (APRA) and Australasian Mechanical Copyright Owners Society (AMCOS).

Year	Nominee / work	Award	Result
2000	"Weir"	Song of the Year	Nominated
2001	Ella Hooper, Jesse Hooper – Killing Heidi	Songwriter of the Year	Won

=== ARIA Awards ===
The ARIA Music Awards are presented annually from 1987 by the Australian Recording Industry Association (ARIA). Killing Heidi have won four trophies from ten nominations.

Year	Nominee / work	Award	Result
2000	Reflector	Album of the Year	Won
2000	Reflector	Best Group	Won
2000	Reflector	Best Rock Album	Won
2000	Reflector	Breakthrough Artist – Album	Won
2000	Reflector	Highest Selling Album	Nominated
2000	Paul Kosky – Reflector	Best Cover Art	Nominated
2000	"Mascara"	Single of the Year	Nominated
2001	"Superman Supergirl"	Best Group	Nominated
2001	Paul Kosky – "Superman Supergirl"	Producer of the Year	Nominated
2002	"Heavensent"	Best Independent Release	Nominated

== Discography ==
- Reflector (2000)
- Present (2002)
- Killing Heidi (2004)
