= Present (Killing Heidi album) =

Studio album by Killing Heidi
- Released: 25 October 2002
- Recorded: March 2001−June 2002
- Genre: Rock
- Length: 49:06
- Label: Wah Wah/Sony
- Producers: Paul Kosky, Andy Baldwin

Killing Heidi chronology
Reflector (2000)	Present (2002)	Killing Heidi (2004)

Singles from Present
- 1. "Heavensent" Released: 10 December 2001; 2. "Outside of Me" Released: 23 September 2002

Present is the second studio album by the Australian band Killing Heidi, released in Australia on 25 October 2002 (see 2002 in music), which peaked at No. 12 on the ARIA Albums Chart. It was produced by Paul Kosky, Chris Robinson and Andy Baldwyn, and followed from the group's debut album, Reflector.

Two singles were released, "Heavensent", which peaked at No. 28 on the ARIA Singles Chart, and "Outside of Me", which reached No. 12. A third album track, "Ammyl (Say What You Wanna Say)", was released to radio in 2003 but was never sold as a commercial single.

The album uses four interludes between some tracks, known as "Heidiludes". These are short segments (varying from 11 to 36 seconds), featuring soft instruments and synths against Ella's distant backing vocals. On 28 October 2002 it was released with a limited edition bonus DVD disc of seven of their music videos and six live performances. The artwork was the same, except the package had a fold out cardboard.

== Background ==
Work on Killing Heidi's second album was delayed when lead vocalist, Ella Hooper was diagnosed with a cyst on her vocal cords in mid-2001 and she underwent throat surgery later that year. In November of the following year she told Peter Holmes of The Sydney Morning Herald, "I have a rule – no singing before 10am. Nothing comes out, even if I wanted it to. If I'm on at 10am I have to be up by 8.30am, because it takes a while for my voice to sound human. It's like a croaky 80-year-old lady."

It was co-produced by Paul Kosky (who was also their manager) and Chris Robinson with Andy Baldwyn and issued on Wah Wah Music/Sony Music Australia. In 2003 Kosky left the group and Wah Wah Music to Robinson, Andrew Murfett of The Age opined, "Tensions between the band and Kosky were building. Something had to give." Kosky observed, "Everyone was looking for a fall guy. It happened to be me and I left gracefully. I put my life into it for five years and I gambled a lot. Like any relationship, you find a time when you move on."

== Reception ==
Present received mixed responses from critics: some praised its fusion of hard rock songs like "Damage Control" and softer, melodic tunes like "Heavensent"; others claimed Present stuck too closely to the formula laid out on Reflector. Commercially, Present did not perform as well as its predecessor, it shipped 35,000 copies and received gold certification by Australian Recording Industry Association (ARIA). The Age's Craig Mathieson felt that Present was "a comparative commercial failure." Holmes described it as, "a dose of punchy, melodic rock embellished with keyboards, strings, horns, scratching and drum loops. Arguably, however, the highlight is 'Sweet', a sunny semi-acoustic singalong."

Nonetheless, it has been described as a favourite among fans. In August 2004 Paul Cashmere of Undercover News compared this album to their self-titled third one, "After the not so successful second album Present in 2002, the forthcoming Killing Heidi sounds like a return to their alt-rock origins. The songs were toucher [sic] and swayed right away from the pop orientated sounds."

== Track listing ==
1. "Heidilude 1" – 0:36
2. "Ammyl" – 4:25
3. "Burnt" – 3:45
4. "Heidilude 2" – 0:24
5. "Heavensent" – 4:31
6. "To Fly" – 4:07
7. "Heidilude 3" – 0:31
8. "The Days" – 4:43
9. "Outside of Me" – 4:05
10. "Pave the Way" – 3:45
11. "Sweet" – 3:45
12. "Heidilude 4" – 0:11
13. "Take It" – 3:44
14. "1, 2, 3, 4, 5" – 3:08
15. "Damage Control" – 7:26

Limited edition bonus DVD

1. "Weir" (music video)
2. "Weir" (USA music video)
3. "Mascara" (music video)
4. "Live Without It" (music video)
5. "Superman/Supergirl" (music video)
6. "Heavensent" (music video)
7. "Outside of Me" (music video)
8. "Weir" (live)
9. "Mascara" (live)
10. "Superman/Supergirl" (live)
11. "Live Without It" (live)
12. "1, 2, 3, 4, 5" (live)
13. "Heavensent" (live)

== Charts ==
Chart (2002/03)	Peak position
Australian Albums (ARIA)	12

== Certifications ==
Region	Certification	Certified units/sales
Australia (ARIA)	Gold	35,000^{^}
^{^} Shipments figures based on certification alone.
