= Live Without It =

2000 single by Killing Heidi

Single by Killing Heidi

from the album Reflector
- Released: 3 April 2000
- Length: 3:11
- Label: Wah-Wah, Roadshow
- Songwriters: Ella Hooper, Jesse Hooper
- Producer: Paul Kosky

Killing Heidi singles chronology
"Mascara" / "Leave Me Alone" (1999)	"Live Without It" (2000)	"Superman Supergirl" (2000)

"Live Without It" is a song by Australian rock band Killing Heidi, released as the third single from their debut album, Reflector, in April 2000.

== Track listing ==
Yellow cover

1. "Live Without It"
2. "Teen Angst Unrequited Love Song" (Raw mix)
3. "Pins and Needles" (Raw mix)

Purple cover

1. "Live Without It" (Radio mix)
2. "Teen Angst Unrequited Love Song" (Raw mix)
3. "Pins and Needles" (Raw mix)
4. "Mascara" (Acoustic mix)
5. "Live Without It" (Music video)

== Charts ==
=== Weekly charts ===
Chart (2000)	Peak position
Australia (ARIA)	5
New Zealand (Recorded Music NZ)	28

=== Year-end charts ===
Chart (2000)	Position
Australia (ARIA)	65

== Certification ==
Region	Certification	Certified units/sales
Australia (ARIA)	Gold	35,000^{^}
^{^} Shipments figures based on certification alone.
