= Overseas Telecommunications Veterans Association =

The Overseas Telecommunications Veterans Association (also abbreviated OTVA) was founded in Sydney, Australia in 1956 by long-serving employees and ex-employees of Amalgamated Wireless Australasia (AWA), Cable & Wireless and Australia's then international telecommunications carrier, the Overseas Telecommunications Commission (OTC), which had itself been established a decade earlier by combining the international radio and cable assets of AWA and C&W respectively.

The Australian Government merged OTC with Telecom Australia in 1992 to form the Australian and Overseas Telecommunications Corporation, subsequently renamed Telstra, but the OTVA continues to hold regular meetings, special interest events and reunions every year. OTVA celebrated its Golden Jubilee in November 2006.

== OTVA objectives ==
- To promote and protect artifacts and archive materials relating to Australia's international telecommunications history and, in particular, the archives of the Overseas Telecommunications Commission (subsequently Corporation) (OTC) and its antecedents, as well as related materials collected by that organization during its existence.
- To provide opportunities for people with employment experience in international telecommunications, or with an interest in Australia's international telecommunications history, to meet in a social environment for fellowship and discussion of matters of mutual interest. In particular, such matters which are deemed to hold some historical value for researchers and special interest groups and which may therefore be contributed to the OTVA Newsletter.

== OTVA Newsletter ==
Published by the association, featuring input on a wide range of matters relating to the international telecommunications industry by members and guest contributors. Four issues per year are distributed to members, as well as state libraries and the National Library of Australia, Canberra. The first issue was published in 1972 and all are available on CD.

== Highlights from OTVA’s history ==
- On 19 July 1956, OTVA was founded with the adoption of its constitution and election of officers. The first social function was held on 14 December in the form of a "Buffet Tea" held at the State Ballroom, Market Street, Sydney.
- In 1957, Victoria Association was formed in Melbourne. R. Freeman was elected as president and Charlie Carthew as secretary.
- In 1971, OTC General Manager Harold White offers support to Veterans National Secretary position proposed but rejected by Victoria Association.
- In 1972, the National Secretary position was approved and Charlie Carthew was elected. Gordon Cupit commenced OTVA's "Newsletter" as editor and publisher.
- In 1973, South Australia Association was formed in Adelaide. Members' history sheet produced for record of service.
- In 1975, the Queensland Association was formed in Brisbane and Western Australia Association in Perth.
- In 1976, it was agreed that spouses be invited to social functions.
- In 1981, OTVA's 25th Anniversary functions were held, with 118 attending in Sydney and 88 in Melbourne.
- In 1985, AWA retired officers form their own association.
- In 1988, Australia's Bicentennial Exhibition at OTC Paddington Terminal, Sydney, was assisted by veterans acting as guides and loaning material.
- In 1992, OTC Managing Director Steve Burdon approves production of five OTC History archival booklets; these were distributed to all staff, veterans, state and national libraries and special interest groups and individuals.
- In 2002, OTVA participated in "Centenary of Pacific Cable Opening" celebration at Southport School, Queensland, in October. Items from OTC collection lent to museum, together with cable samples.
- In 2004, Life memberships awarded to Gordon Cupit, Jim Anderson, Pam Helps (NSW), Derek Walker (WA), Robert and Elaine Hall (VIC), Max Lang (SA).
- In 2005, OTC collection of nearly 400 separate historical items stored at La Perouse identified, listed and tagged. This included material from 1988 Bicentennial Exhibition at Paddington. These were all added to "The Telstra Collection" for showing (on loan) at museums around Australia and remain permanently owned by Telstra.
- In 2006, OTVA's Golden Jubilee celebrations held 17 November in NSW Bowlers Club, Sydney. A feature of the celebrations was a video presentation: The OTC Story.
- In 2007 OTVA's website re-designed, updated and re-launched.
