= Superman Supergirl =

Single by Killing Heidi

from the album Reflector
- Released: 18 September 2000
- Length: 3:52
- Label: Wah-Wah, Roadshow
- Songwriter(s): Ella Hooper, Jesse Hooper
- Producer(s): Paul Kosky

Killing Heidi singles chronology
"Live Without It" (2000)	"Superman Supergirl" (2000)	"Heavensent" (2001)

"Superman/Supergirl" is the fourth and final single from Australian band Killing Heidi's debut album Reflector. Its B-side is the album track "Black Sheep".

== Track listing ==
CD single

1. "Superman/Supergirl"
2. "Black Sheep"
3. "Live Without It"
4. "Superman/Supergirl" (Music video)

== Charts ==
Chart performance for "Superman/Supergirl"
Chart (2000)	Peak position
Australia (ARIA)	57
