= Weir (song) =

1999 single by Killing Heidi

Single by Killing Heidi

from the album Reflector
- B-side: "Astral Boy" (acoustic)
- Released: 10 May 1999
- Length: 4:04
- Label: Wah-Wah Music; Roadshow Music
- Songwriters: Ella Hooper; Jesse Hooper
- Producer: Paul Kosky

Killing Heidi singles chronology
"Weir" (1999)	"Mascara" / "Leave Me Alone" (1999)

"Weir" is a song by Australian rock band Killing Heidi, released in May 1999 as the first single from their debut studio album, Reflector (2000). The song became a teen anthem in Australia the year of its release, reaching number six on the ARIA Singles Chart, and remains the band's best-known single. In the United States, the song was released to alternative radio on 25 July 2000. The music video was partially filmed in Sydney's Centennial Park. In 2025, the song placed 77 on the Triple J Hottest 100 of Australian Songs.

== Charts ==
=== Weekly charts ===
Chart (1999–2000)	Peak position
Australia (ARIA)	6
New Zealand (Recorded Music NZ)	41

=== Year-end charts ===
Chart (1999)	Position
Australia (ARIA)	36

== Certification ==
Region	Certification	Certified units/sales
Australia (ARIA)	Platinum	70,000^{^}
^{^} Shipments figures based on certification alone.

== Release history ==
Region	Date	Format(s)	Label(s)	Ref.
Australia	10 May 1999	CD	Wah Wah Music; Roadshow Music	
United States	25 July 2000	Alternative radio	Universal	
United States	8 August 2000	Contemporary hit radio	Universal	
