= Ella Hooper =

Australian singer and songwriter

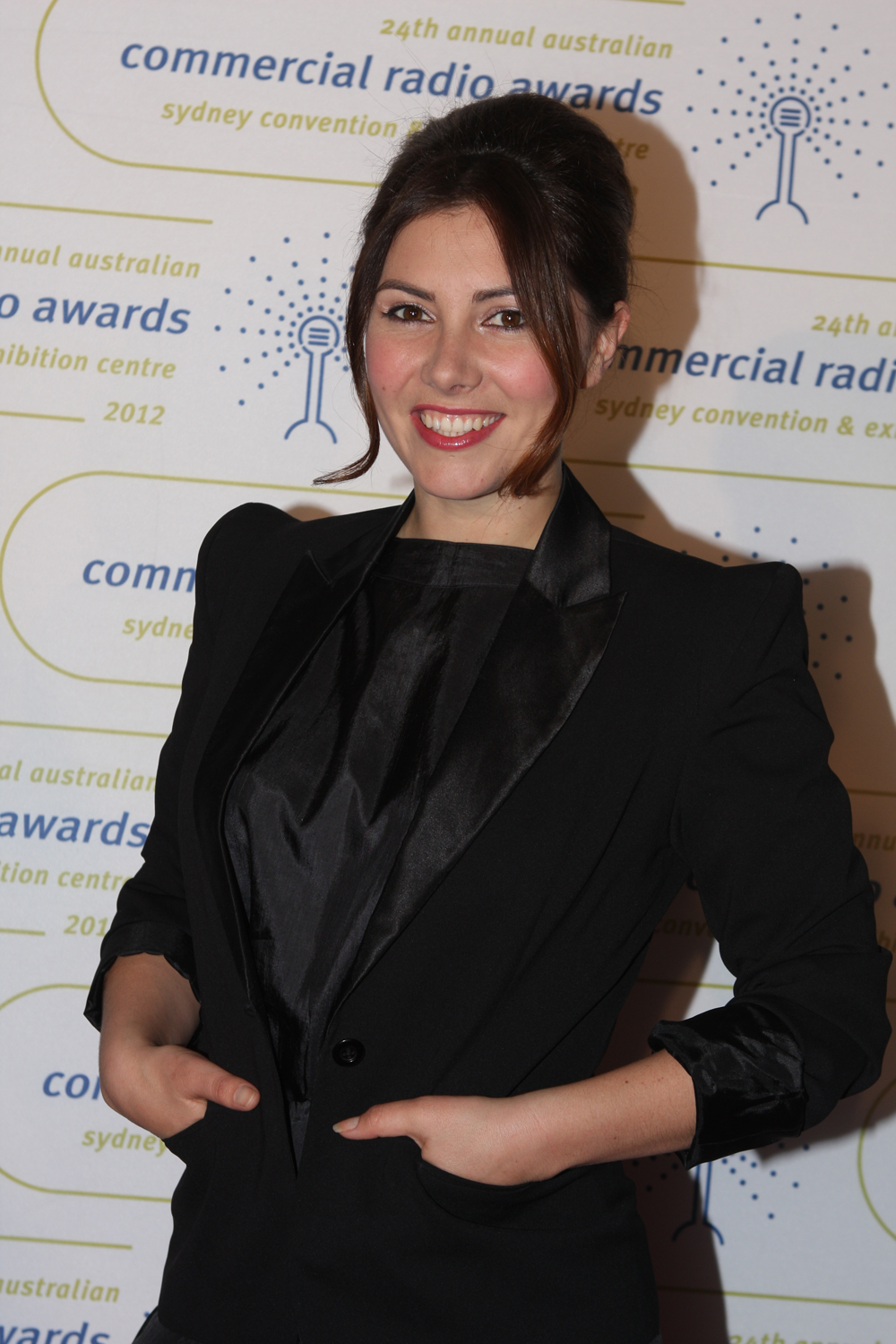
- Hooper in 2012

Background information
- Born: Ella Keighery Hooper; 30 January 1983 (age 43); Melbourne, Victoria, Australia
- Origin: Violet Town, Victoria, Australia
- Genres: Rock, indie, pop rock, country, acoustic
- Years active: 1996–present
- Label: Wah Wah
- Website: Ella Hooper website

Ella Keighery Hooper (born 30 January 1983) is an Australian rock music singer-songwriter, radio presenter and TV personality. Hooper is the lead singer of Killing Heidi. The band formed in 1996 (when Ella was 13) and also featured her older brother Jesse Hooper. Killing Heidi broke up in 2006. Ella and Jesse have performed small scale venues as an acoustic band, The Verses.

Hooper has worked on 2DayFM and was one of the two captains in the short-lived revival of the ABC television show Spicks and Specks that commenced in February 2014.

== Career ==
=== 1983–1995: Early years ===
Born in Melbourne to Helen Keighery and Jeremy Hooper. Hooper grew up in Violet Town, a small rural township (950 people) 175 km north of Melbourne. After finishing Violet Town Primary School, Hooper travelled 27 km by bus to Benalla High School (called Benalla College from 1994) until Year 11. Her parents worked as English and drama teachers, and encouraged Hooper to develop her songwriting skills while Jesse became a guitarist very early on.

=== 1996–2006: Killing Heidi ===
The Hooper siblings wrote and performed songs for a 1996 Triple J competition and won with "Kettle". Hooper moved to Melbourne after Killing Heidi were signed to a recording deal with Wah Wah Music.

In August 1999, Killing Heidi released "Weir" as their debut single. At the ARIA Music Awards of 2000, Killing Heidi won four ARIA Music Awards.

At the APRA Music Awards of 2001 Ella and Jesse Hooper won Songwriter of the Year.

Killing Heidi released three studio albums, Reflector, Present and Killing Heidi, before disbanding in 2006.

=== 2007–2011: The Verses ===
In mid-2006, she toured Australia with the all-female musical line-up of Broad, alongside Australian pop musician Deborah Conway, among others.

After Killing Heidi broke up, Hooper began playing acoustic gigs at smaller venues in Australia alongside Jesse as the Verses.

Verses released one studio album titled Seasons in 2010.

=== 2011–present: Solo career ===
In March 2011, Hooper released her version of "On the Inside", the theme song to Prisoner.

In 2012, Hooper became the host, mentor and MC for The Telstra Road to Discovery, a respected talent development program that scours the country for the next generation of singing and songwriting talent.

In 2012, Hooper decided to embark on a solo career after a conversation with Stevie Nicks. Hooper released her first solo single "Low High" on 9 November 2012. The single was produced and recorded by Jan Skubizewski (Owl Eyes, Illy, Way of the Eagle) in his Collingwood studio.

"Häxan", her second single, was released on 26 April 2013, and launched at The Workers Club on 9 May 2013. A third single, "The Red Shoes", followed in June 2014. All three singles feature on Ella's debut album In Tongues, which was released on 21 November 2014 via Pledge Music.

Hooper returned to television on 5 February 2014, as one of two team captains (along with Adam Richard) in the comeback of the ABC's musical quiz show Spicks and Specks. She also hosted the weekly Australian Top 20 countdown across the Today Network during this period.

In 2016, Hooper released the EP New Magic and joined Gena Rose Bruce on the Calamine Sisters tour in support of their respective new releases.

In September 2016, Hooper made a surprise appearance in the seventh episode of an Australian documentary web series called How To Be A Fan With Hex.

In 2018, Hooper joined with Kate Miller-Heidke, Wendy Matthews, Kristin Barardi and Rachel Gaudry for a series of concerts entitled "Both Sides Now: Celebrating the Songs of Joni Mitchell'.

In July 2018, Hooper released the single, "To the Bone". She later announced in an interview that she is planning to release a mini-album in 2019.

On 18 January 2019, Hooper was named as an entry in Eurovision – Australia Decides, a competition to represent Australia at the Eurovision Song Contest 2019. Her song "Data Dust" finished 10th out of 10. In February 2019 Hooper confirmed the upcoming release of an EP saying "I've been working on a new EP or mini album over the last few months and playing the new tracks live before they're released is a great way to see what's really connecting with my audience before I put the final touches on the songs."

In 2019, Hooper joined seven celebrities including Lisa Curry, Georgie Parker, Casey Donovan and Lynne McGranger for All new monty|The All New Monty: Ladies Night – a one night only special event choreographed by Todd McKenney, where they bared all for women's health awareness, in particular breast cancer. Hooper shared publicly for the first time that her mum was diagnosed with stage 3 breast cancer.

In 2021, Hooper was revealed to be Baby during Season 3 of The Masked Singer Australia.

In October 2022, Hooper released "Words Like These" and announced her second studio album, Small Town Temple, which was released on 20 January 2023.

In August 2026, Hooper announced the release of her third studio album Overnight Success.

== Discography ==
=== Albums ===
List of studio albums, with selected details
Title	Details	Peak chart positions
Title	Details	AUS
In Tongues	Released: 27 November 2014; Label: Ella Hooper; Formats: CD, digital download, vinyl (2025)	— (Note: In Tongues did not enter the ARIA Top 100 Album Chart, but peaked at number 48 on the Digital Albums Chart.)
Small Town Temple	Released: 20 January 2023; Label: Reckless (RR001); Formats: CD, LP, digital download	77
Overnight Success	Released: 2 October 2026; Label: Ella Hooper, MGM (D-EH004); Formats: CD, digital download	19

=== Extended plays ===
List of extended plays, with selected details
Title	Details
Venom	Released: 7 August 2015; Label: Gaga Digi; Formats: Digital download
Live at Fight Night Records	Released: 19 April 2024; Label: Reckless Records; Formats: Digital download

=== Singles ===
List of singles, with selected chart positions
Year	Title	Album
2012	"Low High"	In Tongues
2013	"Häxan"	In Tongues
2014	"The Red Shoes"	In Tongues
2015	"I Am Woman" (with Judith Lucy)	Non-album singles
2018	"To the Bone"	Non-album singles
2019	"Data Dust"	Non-album singles
2022	"Words Like These"	Small Town Temple
2022	"Old News"	Small Town Temple
2023	"Grow Wild"	Small Town Temple
2023	"Way Out West" (with James Reyne)	TBA
2023	"Oh My Goddess!"	Small Town Temple
2025	"Growing Up Is Hard to Do"	
2026	"I Got Eyes (On You)"	Overnight Success
2026	"Blown Away" (with Bachelor Girl featuring Tommy Emmanuel)	Waiting for the Day: Artist Sessions
2026	"When the Shit Went Down"	Overnight Success
2026	"Cowboy Man"	Overnight Success

== Awards and nominations ==
=== APRA Awards ===
The APRA Awards are presented annually from 1982 by the Australasian Performing Right Association (APRA) and Australasian Mechanical Copyright Owners Society (AMCOS).

Year	Nominee / work	Award	Result
2000	"Weir" (Ella Hooper & Jesse Hooper)	Song of the Year	Nominated
2001	Ella Hooper & Jesse Hooper – Killing Heidi	Songwriter of the Year	Won
