= List of songs by Paul Kelly =

Australian singer-songwriter Paul Kelly has written and recorded thirty studio albums over the course of his multi-decade career. His discography stretches from solo works to collaborations with various backing bands, re-interpretations of poems and co-writes for fellow artists.

== Released songs ==
A list of all songs performed or written by Kelly. Live renditions are only included in this table if they preceded a studio version of a song. Cover songs are excluded unless Kelly featured on the recording.

Key
‡	Song released as a single
†	Song not written or co-written by Paul Kelly
#	Song only released as a live recording

Name of song, writer(s), original release, and year of release
Song	Artist(s)	Writer(s)	Original release	Year	Notes
"40 Miles"	Troy Cassar-Daley	Troy Cassar-Daley; Paul Kelly	Long Way Home	2002	
"A Barred Owl" (Richard Wilbur poem)	Paul Kelly, James Ledger, Alice Keath & Seraphim Trio	Richard Wilbur; Paul Kelly; James Ledger	Thirteen Ways to Look at Birds	2019	
"A Bastard Like Me" ‡	Paul Kelly	Paul Kelly	Nature	2018	(Note: Subtitled "For Charlie Perkins" on Songs from the South: 1985–2019.)
"Adelaide"	Paul Kelly	Paul Kelly	Post	1985	
"Adelaide"	Paul Kelly and the Coloured Girls	Paul Kelly	Gossip	1986	
"After the Show"	Paul Kelly and the Coloured Girls	Paul Kelly	Gossip	1986	
"Ain't Got the Constitution"	Paul Kelly & Gerry Hale	Paul Kelly; Gerry Hale	Silent Partner (Original Motion Picture Soundtrack)	2001	(Note: A separate reprise track is also included on the soundtrack release.)
"Ain't No Scene"	High Rise Bombers	Unknown	History Pt. 1	1979	
"Alive and Well" ‡	Paul Kelly and the Dots	Paul Kelly	Manila	1982	
"All Those Smiling Faces" ‡	Paul Kelly	Paul Kelly; Dana Gioia	Fever Longing Still	2024	
"Almost Persuaded" (David Houston cover)	Paul Kelly with Renée Geyer & Deborah Conway	Glenn Sutton; Billy Sherrill †	Seven Deadly Sins (Music from the ABC TV Series)	1992	
"Alone and Forsaken" (Hank Williams cover)	Lucky Oceans & Paul Kelly	Hank Williams †	Purple Sky (Songs Originally by Hank Williams)	2019	
"Alone with You" ‡ (Sunnyboys cover)	Paul Kelly	Jeremy Oxley †	Mushroom: Fifty Years of Making Noise (Reimagined)	2023	
"Amazing Grace"	Gurrumul & Paul Kelly	John Newton †	The Gospel Album	2015	
"An Irish Airman Foresees His Death" (W. B. Yeats poem)	Paul Kelly	W. B. Yeats; Paul Kelly	Love Is Strong as Death	2019	(Note: First performed live in 2016 with Camille O'Sullivan and Feargal Murray as part of the Ancient Rain stage production.)
"Anastasia Changes Her Mind"	Paul Kelly	Paul Kelly	Deeper Water	1995	
"And Death Shall Have No Dominion" ‡ (Dylan Thomas poem)	Paul Kelly	Dylan Thomas; Paul Kelly	Nature	2018	
"Angel in Me"	High Rise Bombers	Paul Kelly	History Pt. 1	1979	
"Angel in Me"	Paul Kelly and the Dots	Paul Kelly	Non-album single (B-side to "Seeing Is Believing")	1980	
"Angel of Death" (Hank Williams cover)	Paul Kelly & Charlie Owen	Hank Williams †	Death's Dateless Night	2016	
"Anti-Hero" ‡ (Taylor Swift cover)	Paul Kelly	Taylor Swift; Jack Antonoff †	Non-album single	2024	
"Arthur McBride"	Paul Kelly	Traditional; Paul Kelly; Dan Kelly; Cameron Bruce; Bill McDonald; Ashley Naylor; Peter Luscombe	Paul Kelly's Christmas Train	2021	
"Autumn"	Wicked Beat Sound System	Damian Robinson; Linda Janssen; Dave Carnovale; Marko Simec; Paul Kelly	New Soul Breaks	2002	
"Back to the Future"	Paul Kelly	Paul Kelly	Time	2022	(Note: First recorded for Kelly's 2022 compilation album Time, it was also included on his 2024 studio album Fever Longing Still.)
"Ball and Chain"	Paul Kelly	Paul Kelly; Randy Jacobs	Wanted Man	1994	
"Barn Owl" (Gwen Harwood poem)	Paul Kelly, James Ledger, Alice Keath & Seraphim Trio	Gwen Harwood; Paul Kelly	Thirteen Ways to Look at Birds	2019	
"Barn Owl" (Gwen Harwood poem)	Paul Kelly	Gwen Harwood; Paul Kelly	Love Is Strong as Death	2019	
"Basking Shark" (Norman MacCaig poem)	Paul Kelly, James Ledger, Genevieve Lacey & ANAM Musicians	Norman MacCaig; Paul Kelly; James Ledger	Conversations with Ghosts	2013	
"Be Careful What You Pray For"	Vika & Linda	Paul Kelly	Two Wings	1999	
"Be Careful What You Pray For"	Paul Kelly & Gerry Hale	Paul Kelly	Silent Partner (Original Motion Picture Soundtrack)	2001	
"Beat of Your Heart"	Paul Kelly	Paul Kelly	Words and Music	1998	
"Beautiful Feeling"	Paul Kelly	Paul Kelly; Dan Kelly; Dan Luscombe; Peter Luscombe; Bill McDonald	Ways & Means	2004	
"Beautiful Promise"	Paul Kelly and the Boon Companions	Paul Kelly	Fireflies: The Songs of Paul Kelly (From the ABC TV Series)	2004	
"Bed of Nails" (Ross Wilson cover)	Paul Kelly	Ross Wilson; Eris O'Brien; John Pullicino †	Non-album single (B-side to "Love Never Runs on Time")	1994	
"Before the Old Man Died"	Paul Kelly and the Coloured Girls	Paul Kelly	Gossip	1986	
"Before Too Long" ‡	Paul Kelly and the Coloured Girls	Paul Kelly	Gossip	1986	
"Beggar on the Street of Love"	Paul Kelly and the Messengers	Paul Kelly	Hidden Things (B-side to "Most Wanted Man in the World")	1992	
"Behind the Bowler's Arm" ‡	Paul Kelly	Paul Kelly	Non-album single (B-side to "Deeper Water")	1995	(Note: Initially a B-side on 1995's "Deeper Water", the song was given a standalone single re-release in December 2025 during the 2025–26 Ashes series. This marked the first time the studio version was available digitally.)
"Better Be Home Soon" # (Crowded House cover)	Neil Finn & Paul Kelly	Neil Finn †	Goin' Your Way	2013	
"Better Prospects"	Paul Kelly & Gerry Hale	Paul Kelly; Gerry Hale	Silent Partner (Original Motion Picture Soundtrack)	2001	
"Between Two Shores"	Vika & Linda	Vika Bull; Linda Bull; Paul Kelly	Princess Tabu	1996	
"Bicentennial"	Paul Kelly and the Coloured Girls	Paul Kelly	Under the Sun	1987	(Note: The pre-release version contained in the National Film and Sound Archive is titled "200 Years".)
"Big Fine Girl"	Paul Kelly	Paul Kelly	Ways & Means	2004	(Note: A song listed as "Big 5 [?]" was recorded by Paul Kelly and the Dots during the sessions for their 1982 album Manila and is contained in the National Film and Sound Archive; this may be a mistranscription for an early version of "Big Fine Girl".)
"Big Heart"	Paul Kelly and the Coloured Girls	Paul Kelly	Under the Sun	1987	
"Billy Baxter" ‡	Paul Kelly and the Dots	Paul Kelly	Talk	1981	
"Bird on the Wire" (Leonard Cohen cover)	Paul Kelly & Charlie Owen	Leonard Cohen †	Death's Dateless Night	2016	
"Black Cockatoos" (Judith Wright poem)	Paul Kelly, James Ledger, Alice Keath & Seraphim Trio	Judith Wright; Paul Kelly; James Ledger	Thirteen Ways to Look at Birds	2019	
"Black Swan"	Paul Kelly, James Ledger, Alice Keath & Seraphim Trio	James Ledger †	Thirteen Ways to Look at Birds	2019	
"Bleeding Heart" ‡	The Johnnys	Paul Kelly; Spencer P. Jones; Graham Hood; Billy Pommer; Paul Doherty	Highlights of a Dangerous Life	1986	
"Blowfly"	Professor Ratbaggy	Steve Hadley; Bruce Haymes; Paul Kelly; Peter Luscombe	Professor Ratbaggy	1999	
"Blue Stranger"	Paul Kelly and the Messengers	Paul Kelly	Comedy	1991	
"Blues for Skip"	Paul Kelly	Paul Kelly	Post	1985	
"Blush"	Paul Kelly	Paul Kelly	Deeper Water	1995	
"Body Drop"	Paul Kelly & Dan Luscombe featuring Soteria Bell	Paul Kelly; Dan Luscombe	Jindabyne (Original Motion Picture Soundtrack)	2006	
"Boon Companion"	The Boon Companions	Paul Kelly	Fireflies: The Songs of Paul Kelly (From the ABC TV Series)	2004	
"Bound to Follow"	Paul Kelly, James Ledger, Genevieve Lacey & ANAM Musicians	Paul Kelly; Dan Kelly; James Ledger	Conversations with Ghosts	2013	
"Bound to Follow"	Paul Kelly featuring Kate Miller-Heidke	Paul Kelly; Dan Kelly; James Ledger	Nature	2018	(Note: Subtitled "Aisling Song" on Nature, and "Aisling's Song" in its APRA AMCOS registration.)
"Bradman" ‡	Paul Kelly and the Coloured Girls	Paul Kelly	Under the Sun (Australian CD edition)	1987	(Note: A recording by Paul Kelly and the Dots from 1982 is contained in the National Film and Sound Archive.)
"Brand New Ways" #	Paul Kelly and the Messengers	Paul Kelly	Hidden Things (B-side to "Keep It to Yourself")	1992	
"Brighter"	Paul Kelly and the Messengers	Paul Kelly	Comedy	1991	
"Brighter Day" #	Troy Cassar-Daley	Troy Cassar-Daley; Paul Kelly	Live	2010	(Note: A studio version was released on Cassar-Daley's 2016 album Things I Carry Around.)
"Brother"	Little Birdy	Katy Steele †	Confetti	2009	(Note: Kelly is credited with vocal accompaniment and harmonica in Confetti's liner notes.)
"Buffalo Ballet" (John Cale cover)	Paul Kelly and the Messengers	John Cale †	Comedy	1991	
"California"	Paul Kelly	Paul Kelly	Deeper Water	1995	
"Can't Decide"	Jo Jo Zep	Joe Camilleri; Simon Gyllies; Paul Kelly	Cha	1982	
"Can't Fake It"	Professor Ratbaggy	Steve Hadley; Bruce Haymes; Paul Kelly; Peter Luscombe	Professor Ratbaggy	1999	
"Can't Help You Now"	Paul Kelly	Paul Kelly; Dan Kelly	Ways & Means	2004	
"Careless" ‡	Paul Kelly and the Messengers	Paul Kelly	So Much Water So Close to Home	1989	
"Change Your Mind"	Christine Anu	Paul Kelly; Christine Anu	Come My Way	2000	
"Change Your Mind"	Paul Kelly	Paul Kelly; Christine Anu	...Nothing but a Dream	2001	
"Charcoal Lane" (Archie Roach cover)	Paul Kelly	Archie Roach †	Moon Over Melbourne	1993	
"Charcoal Lane" (Archie Roach cover)	Paul Kelly & Courtney Barnett	Archie Roach †	Charcoal Lane: 25th Anniversary Collection	2015	
"Charlie Owen's Slide Guitar"	Paul Kelly	Paul Kelly	Words and Music	1998	
"Cherry"	High Rise Bombers	Paul Kelly	History Pt. 1	1979	(Note: A demo recording by the Debutantes from 1977 is available as a bootleg.)
"Cherry"	Paul Kelly and the Dots	Paul Kelly	Talk	1981	
"Child Soldier" ‡	Flybz featuring Paul Kelly	Fablice Manirakiza; Irakiza Froleni; Paul Kelly; Paul Stewart; Jesse Hooper; Pat Marks	Non-album single	2013	
"Christmas" (Large Number Twelves cover)	Paul Kelly	Chris Harrington; Wes Harrington †	Paul Kelly's Christmas Train	2021	
"Christmas (Baby, Please Come Home)" (Darlene Love cover)	Paul Kelly & Linda Bull	Jeff Barry; Ellie Greenwich; Phil Spector †	Paul Kelly's Christmas Train	2021	
"Christmas Eve"	Archie Roach & Paul Kelly	Archie Roach †	Rockin' Bethlehem: The Second Coming	1990	
"Christmas Kangaroo"	Whistle & Trick featuring Paul Kelly	Esther Holt; Maddy Kelly; Colin Leadbetter †	Christmas Every Day	2025	
"Christmas Must Be Tonight" (The Band cover)	Paul Kelly	Robbie Robertson †	The Spirit of Christmas 2001	2001	
"Christmas Train" (The Bellrays cover)	Paul Kelly & Vika Bull	Tony Bramel †	Paul Kelly's Christmas Train	2021	
"Cinnamon Girl" # (Neil Young and Crazy Horse cover)	RocKwiz featuring Paul Kelly	Neil Young †	RocKwiz, Vol. 1 (Live)	2024	
"Cities of Texas"	Paul Kelly and the Messengers	Paul Kelly	So Much Water So Close to Home	1989	
"Cities of Texas"	Paul Kelly and the Stormwater Boys	Paul Kelly	Foggy Highway	2005	
"Claire on the Road"	Paul Kelly & Dan Luscombe featuring Soteria Bell	Paul Kelly; Dan Luscombe	Jindabyne (Original Motion Picture Soundtrack)	2006	
"Clean This House" ‡	Paul Kelly and the Dots	Paul Kelly	Manila	1982	
"Climb Into the Music" ‡	Gypsy & The Cat featuring Paul Kelly	Xavier Bacash; Lionel Towers; Paul Kelly	Non-album single	2015	
"Close"	Renée Geyer	Paul Kelly; Renée Geyer	Difficult Woman	1994	
"Cold as Canada"	Paul Kelly	Paul Kelly	Spring and Fall	2012	
"Cold Pizza" ‡	Alex the Astronaut	Alexandra Lynn; Paul Kelly	Rage and All Its Friends	2024	
"Coma" ‡	Professor Ratbaggy	Steve Hadley; Bruce Haymes; Paul Kelly; Peter Luscombe	Professor Ratbaggy	1999	
"Come My Way"	Christine Anu	Christine Anu; Stuart Crichton; Paul Kelly	Non-album single (B-side to "Jump to Love")	2000	
"Come Thou Fount of Every Blessing" (Robert Robinson hymn)	Paul Kelly	Robert Robinson †	Paul Kelly's Christmas Train	2021	
"Comin' Home Baby"	Renée Geyer with Paul Kelly	Ben Tucker; Bob Dorough †	Swing	2013	
"Cool Hand Lukin" ‡	Paul Kelly	Paul Kelly; Paul Hewson	Non-album single	2025	(Note: Recorded by Tony Cohen at Paradise Studios, Sydney during the Post sessions in 1984, the song was included in Kelly's 1993 book Lyrics under the chapter for that album but remained unreleased until a copy of the recording was rediscovered four decades later.)
"Coventry Carol"	Kate Miller-Heidke, Jess Hitchcock, Alice Keath, Marlon Williams & Paul Kelly	Traditional; Alex Palmer; Alice Keath; Ross Irwin; Paul Kelly	Paul Kelly's Christmas Train	2021	
"Cradle of Love"	Anne Kirkpatrick	Paul Kelly	Game of Love	1993	
"Cradle of Love"	Kelly Willis	Paul Kelly	What I Deserve	1999	
"Cradle of Love"	Paul Kelly	Paul Kelly	...Nothing but a Dream (...The Gift That Keeps on Giving bonus disc edition)	2002	
"Crosstown"	Paul Kelly and the Coloured Girls	Paul Kelly	Under the Sun	1987	
"Cry One More Time"	Paul Kelly	Paul Kelly; Dan Kelly; Dan Luscombe; Peter Luscombe; Bill McDonald	Non-album single (B-side to "Sure Got Me")	2003	
"Cry One More Time"	Renée Geyer	Paul Kelly; Dan Kelly; Dan Luscombe; Peter Luscombe; Bill McDonald	Tonight	2005	
"Crying Shame"	Paul Kelly	Paul Kelly; Dan Kelly; Dan Luscombe; Peter Luscombe; Bill McDonald	Ways & Means	2004	
"Curly Red"	Paul Kelly	Paul Kelly	Ways & Means	2004	
"Darling It Hurts" ‡	Paul Kelly and the Coloured Girls	Paul Kelly; Steve Connolly	Gossip	1986	
"Day in the Life"	Paul Kelly & Shane O'Mara	Paul Kelly	Everynight... Everynight	1996	
"Deeper"	Paul Kelly	Paul Kelly	Non-album single (B-side to "Deeper Water")	1995	
"Deeper Water" ‡	Paul Kelly	Paul Kelly; Randy Jacobs	Deeper Water	1995	
"Deportees" # (Woody Guthrie cover)	Paul Kelly	Woody Guthrie †	Non-album single (B-side to "Dumb Things")	1988	
"Derailment"	High Rise Bombers	Paul Kelly	History Pt. 1	1979	(Note: A recording by Paul Kelly and the Dots from 1979 is contained in the National Film and Sound Archive.)
"Desdemona"	Paul Kelly and the Coloured Girls	Paul Kelly	Under the Sun	1987	
"Did It Again" # ‡ (Kylie Minogue cover)	Paul Kelly	Kylie Minogue; Steve Anderson; Dave Seaman †	Non-album single	2025	(Note: Subtitled "Triple J Like a Version".)
"Difficult Woman"	Renée Geyer	Paul Kelly	Difficult Woman	1994	
"Difficult Woman"	Paul Kelly	Paul Kelly	Deeper Water	1995	
"Dirty Ground"	Dan Sultan	Dan Sultan; Paul Kelly	Dirty Ground	2014	(Note: Prior to the song's release, it was referred to in live performances as "Lonely Lover".)
"Distant Sun" # (Crowded House cover)	Neil Finn & Paul Kelly	Neil Finn †	Goin' Your Way	2013	
"Domestic Criminal"	High Rise Bombers	Martin Armiger †	Round and Round the Melbourne Club	1981	
"Don't Break It I Say"	Deborah Conway, Paul Kelly & Renée Geyer	Paul Kelly; Deborah Conway; Renée Geyer; Martin Armiger	Seven Deadly Sins (Music from the ABC TV Series)	1992	
"Don't Dream It's Over" # (Crowded House cover)	Neil Finn & Paul Kelly	Neil Finn †	Goin' Your Way	2013	
"Don't Explain"	Paul Kelly	Paul Kelly	Live, May 1992	1992	(Note: A studio version, featuring vocals from Linda Bull, was released on Kelly's 2017 album Life Is Fine.)
"Don't Fence Me In" (Cole Porter cover)	Paul Kelly & Charlie Owen	Cole Porter; Robert Fletcher †	Death's Dateless Night	2016	
"Don't Give Up on Me"	Paul Kelly featuring Meg Washington	Paul Kelly	Seventy	2025	
"Don't Harm the Messenger"	Paul Kelly and the Coloured Girls	Paul Kelly	Gossip	1986	
"Don't Let a Good Thing Go"	Paul Kelly featuring Dan Sultan	Paul Kelly; Billy Miller	The Merri Soul Sessions	2014	(Note: Performed by "The Merri Souls", a studio band which includes Kelly on rhythm guitar and features various guest vocalists. Each song on The Merri Soul Sessions credits Kelly as the primary artist.) (Note: A live version of the song was recorded on 20 September 1994 during a soundcheck for Kelly's performance at the Continental Cafe. This recording is contained in the National Film and Sound Archive.)
"Don't Let a Good Thing Go"	Billy Miller & Paul Kelly	Paul Kelly; Billy Miller	Australia	2015	
"Don't Say I'm No Good"	Mary-Jo Starr	Paul Kelly	Too Many Movies	1990	
"Don't Stand So Close to the Window" ‡ (Note: The single release was the version taken from Under the Sun and released as a single in 1988.)	Paul Kelly and the Coloured Girls	Paul Kelly; Alex McGregor	Under the Sun	1987	
"Don't Stand So Close to the Window" ‡	Paul Kelly and the Stormwater Boys	Paul Kelly; Alex McGregor	Foggy Highway	2005	
"Don't Start Me Talking" ‡	Paul Kelly and the Messengers	Paul Kelly	Comedy	1991	
"Don't Wait for Tomorrow"	Kutcha Edwards	Kutcha Edwards; Paul Kelly	Cooinda	2001	
"Double Business Bound"	Paul Kelly	Paul Kelly	Fever Longing Still	2024	
"Down on My Speedway"	Paul Kelly and the Coloured Girls	Paul Kelly	Gossip	1986	
"Down on the Jetty"	Paul Kelly featuring Vika & Linda Bull	Paul Kelly; Linda Bull	The Merri Soul Sessions	2014	
"Down to My Soul"	Paul Kelly and the Stormwater Boys	Paul Kelly	Foggy Highway	2005	
"Droving Woman" (Kev Carmody cover)	Augie March, Missy Higgins & Paul Kelly	Kev Carmody †	Non-album single (B-side to "Peachy")	2007	
"Dumb Things" ‡	Paul Kelly and the Coloured Girls	Paul Kelly	Under the Sun	1987	
"Dumb Things" ‡	A.B. Original featuring Paul Kelly and Dan Sultan	Paul Kelly	Triple J: Like a Version 13	2017	(Note: Subtitled "Triple J Like a Version" on some releases; Sultan is only credited on the original video release.)
"Eight Hours Sleep"	Paul Kelly	Paul Kelly; Wendell Berry; Billy Miller	Fever Longing Still	2024	
"Elly" (Kev Carmody cover)	Paul Kelly and the Messengers	Kev Carmody †	Hidden Things (B-side to "Don't Start Me Talking")	1992	
"Emotional"	Paul Kelly	Paul Kelly; Dan Kelly	Won't You Come Around	2003	(Note: First uploaded as a low-res MP3 to Kelly's website in 2002 under the title "I Get a Little Emotional Sometimes"; a live recording was included on the Homebake Vol. 6 compilation album that year. The track was also referred to as "Woomera Song".)
"Erina Valley Breakout"	Paul Kelly and the Stormwater Boys	Mick Albeck; James Gillard; Paul Kelly; Rod McCormack; Ian Simpson; Trevor Warner	Foggy Highway (Limited 2 CD edition)	2005	
"Eurydice and the Tawny Frogmouth" (Robert Adamson poem)	Paul Kelly, James Ledger, Alice Keath & Seraphim Trio	Robert Adamson; Paul Kelly; James Ledger	Thirteen Ways to Look at Birds (Vinyl edition)	2019	
"Eurydice and the Tawny Frogmouth" (Robert Adamson poem)	Paul Kelly	Robert Adamson; Paul Kelly; James Ledger	Love Is Strong as Death	2019	
"Every Day My Mother's Voice" ‡	Paul Kelly & Dan Sultan	Paul Kelly	Non-album single	2019	
"Every Fucking City" #	Paul Kelly	Paul Kelly	Roll on Summer	2000	
"Every Step of the Way" ‡	Paul Kelly	Paul Kelly	Non-album single	2021	
"Every Time We Say Goodbye" (Cole Porter cover)	Paul Kelly & Paul Grabowsky	Cole Porter †	Please Leave Your Light On	2020	
"Everybody Loves You Baby"	Stardust Five	Dan Kelly; Paul Kelly; Dan Luscombe; Peter Luscombe; Bill McDonald	Stardust Five	2006	
"Everybody Wants to Touch Me"	Paul Kelly	Paul Kelly	Wanted Man	1994	
"Everynight, Everynight"	Paul Kelly & Shane O'Mara	Paul Kelly	Everynight... Everynight	1996	
"Everything Is Plundered" (Anna Akhmatova poem)	Paul Kelly	Anna Akhmatova; Helen Gifford	Forty Days	2020	
"Everything's Turning to White"	Paul Kelly and the Messengers	Paul Kelly	So Much Water So Close to Home	1989	
"Extra Mile"	Paul Kelly	Paul Kelly; Randy Jacobs	Deeper Water	1995	
"Fall at Your Feet" # (Crowded House cover)	Neil Finn & Paul Kelly	Neil Finn †	Goin' Your Way	2013	
"Fall Guy"	Paul Kelly and the Dots	Paul Kelly; Chris Langman	Talk	1981	
"Farewell Dan & Edward Kelly"	Paul Kelly	Traditional †	Going Home	1993	
"Faster Than Light (Our Love)" #	High Rise Bombers	Paul Kelly	History Pt. 1	1979	(Note: Listed as "Faster Than Lite" on the release.)
"Faster Than Light (Our Love)" #	The Dots	Paul Kelly	The Dots	1979	
"Feel the Spirit"	Vika & Linda	Vika Bull; Linda Bull; Renée Geyer; Paul Kelly	Two Wings	1999	
"Feelings of Grief"	Paul Kelly	Paul Kelly	Stolen Apples	2007	
"Finally Something Good"	Paul Kelly	Paul Kelly	Life Is Fine	2017	
"Fine" ‡	Meg Washington featuring Paul Kelly	Meg Washington †	Gem	2025	
"Fire and Water (Take Me Down)"	Christine Anu	Christine Anu; Stuart Crichton; Paul Kelly	Come My Way	2000	
"Firewood and Candles" ‡	Paul Kelly	Paul Kelly; Billy Miller	Life Is Fine	2017	
"Five Bells" (Kenneth Slessor poem)	Paul Kelly, James Ledger, Genevieve Lacey & ANAM Musicians	Kenneth Slessor; Paul Kelly; James Ledger	Conversations with Ghosts	2013	
"Foggy Highway"	Paul Kelly	Paul Kelly	Live, May 1992	1992	(Note: A studio version was released as a B-side to Kelly's 2001 single "Somewhere in the City".)
"Foggy Highway"	Paul Kelly and the Stormwater Boys	Paul Kelly	Foggy Highway	2005	
"Fool's Road"	Young Modern	Chris Langman; John Dowler; Paul Kelly	Play Faster	1979	
"For Eleanor"	Paul Kelly with Shane O'Mara, Steve Hadley, Bruce Haymes & Peter Luscombe	Paul Kelly	Lantana (Music for the Feature Film)	2001	
"For the Ages"	Paul Kelly	Paul Kelly; Dan Kelly	Spring and Fall	2012	
"Forbidden Street"	Paul Kelly and the Dots	Paul Kelly; Chris Langman	Manila	1982	
"Forest Funeral / Silver Turns to Lead"	Paul Kelly & Gerry Hale	Paul Kelly; Gerry Hale	Silent Partner (Original Motion Picture Soundtrack)	2001	
"Forty Miles to Saturday Night" ‡	Paul Kelly and the Coloured Girls	Paul Kelly; Alex McGregor	Under the Sun	1987	
"Forty-Eight Angels"	Paul Kelly	Paul Kelly	Ways & Means	2004	
"Four AM" (Wisława Szymborska poem)	Paul Kelly	Wisława Szymborska †	Forty Days	2020	
"Four Seasons in One Day" (Crowded House cover)	Paul Kelly & Angus Stone	Neil Finn; Tim Finn †	He Will Have His Way	2010	
"Freedom Called"	Dave Arden featuring Paul Kelly	Paul Kelly; David Arden	Just Music: A Benefit Album	2012	
"Freedom Ride"	Troy Cassar-Daley featuring Paul Kelly	Troy Cassar-Daley; Paul Kelly	Freedom Ride	2015	
"Friends"	Kutcha Edwards	Kutcha Edwards †	Cooinda	2001	(Note: A duet between Kutcha Edwards and Kelly; the latter is credited with lead vocals in the liner notes of Cooinda.)
"From a Buick 6" (Bob Dylan cover)	High Rise Bombers	Bob Dylan †	History Pt. 1	1979	(Note: The song title was listed erroneously as "Buick 8" on the cassette tape.)
"From Little Things Big Things Grow"	Paul Kelly and the Messengers	Paul Kelly; Kev Carmody	Comedy	1991	
"From Little Things Big Things Grow"	Kev Carmody with Paul Kelly and Tiddas	Paul Kelly; Kev Carmody	Bloodlines	1993	
"From Little Things Big Things Grow"	The GetUp Mob featuring Paul Kelly, Kev Carmody, Missy Higgins, Urthboy, Mia Dyson, Radical Son, Jane Tyrrell, Dan Sultan, Joel Wenitong and Ozi Batla	Paul Kelly; Kev Carmody; Tim Levinson; David Clive; Shannon Kennedy; Richard Pyke	Non-album single	2008	(Note: Subtitled "Get Up Stand Up Version".)
"From St Kilda to Kings Cross" ‡ (Note: The single release was the version taken from Post and released as a single in 1985.)	Paul Kelly	Paul Kelly	Post	1985	
"From St Kilda to Kings Cross" ‡	Paul Kelly and the Messengers	Paul Kelly	Hidden Things (B-side to "Don't Start Me Talking")	1992	
"Funtime"	High Rise Bombers	Unknown	History Pt. 1	1979	
"Gathering Storm"	Paul Kelly	Paul Kelly; Mart Saarelaht	Deeper Water	1995	
"Gathering Storm"	Paul Kelly with Uncle Bill	Paul Kelly; Mart Saarelaht	Smoke	1999	
"Ghost Town"	Paul Kelly and the Messengers	Paul Kelly	Hidden Things (B-side to "Sweet Guy")	1992	
"Ghost Town"	Paul Kelly and the Stormwater Boys	Paul Kelly	Foggy Highway	2005	
"Give in to My Love" ‡	Paul Kelly	Paul Kelly	Deeper Water	1995	
"Glory Be to God"	Paul Kelly	Paul Kelly	How to Make Gravy	1996	
"God Told Me To" ‡ (Note: The single version was the solo recording included on Kelly's 2007 album Stolen Apples.)	Paul Kelly & Dan Kelly	Paul Kelly	Timor Leste: Freedom Rising	2005	
"God Told Me To" ‡	Paul Kelly	Paul Kelly	Stolen Apples	2007	
"God's Grandeur" (Gerard Manley Hopkins poem)	Paul Kelly	Gerard Manley Hopkins; Paul Kelly	Nature	2018	
"God's Grandeur" (Gerard Manley Hopkins poem)	Paul Kelly & Paul Grabowsky	Gerard Manley Hopkins; Paul Kelly	Please Leave Your Light On	2020	
"God's Hotel" ‡	Paul Kelly	Paul Kelly; Nick Cave	Wanted Man	1994	
"Going About My Father's Business"	Paul Kelly and the Coloured Girls	Paul Kelly	Gossip	1986	
"Going to Susan's"	Paul Kelly & Dan Luscombe featuring Soteria Bell	Paul Kelly; Dan Luscombe	Jindabyne (Original Motion Picture Soundtrack)	2006	
"Going to the River with Dad" ‡	Paul Kelly	Paul Kelly	Fever Longing Still	2024	
"Gonna Be Good"	Paul Kelly	Paul Kelly	Spring and Fall	2012	
"Good Things" (Maurice Frawley cover)	Paul Kelly & Charlie Owen	Maurice Frawley †	Death's Dateless Night	2016	
"Gossip"	Paul Kelly and the Coloured Girls	Paul Kelly; Chris Coyne	Gossip	1986	
"Grandma's Hands" (Bill Withers cover)	Paul Kelly	Bill Withers †	Forty Days	2020	
"Gunnamatta"	Paul Kelly	Paul Kelly; Dan Kelly; Dan Luscombe; Peter Luscombe; Bill McDonald	Ways & Means	2004	
"Gutless Wonder"	Paul Kelly	Paul Kelly	Words and Music	1998	
"Gypsy Queen" (Greg Quill and Country Radio cover)	Paul Kelly & The Pigram Brothers	Greg Quill †	Some Lonesome Picker	2016	
"Habit of Love"	High Rise Bombers	Paul Kelly	History Pt. 1	1979	
"Hand Me Down" #	Paul Kelly	Paul Kelly; Paul Gadsby	The Mushroom Evolution Concert	1982	
"Happy Slave"	Paul Kelly and the Coloured Girls	Paul Kelly	Under the Sun	1987	
"Hard Knocks"	Paul Kelly and the Dots	Paul Kelly	Talk	1981	
"Hard Love"	Vika & Linda	Paul Kelly	Vika & Linda	1994	(Note: A recording by Paul Kelly and the Messengers from 1989, also known as "Back of Beyond", is contained in the National Film and Sound Archive.)
"Hard Times"	The Coloured Girls	Steve Connolly †	Hidden Things (B-side to "Don't Stand So Close to the Window")	1992	(Note: Although the song is credited to Paul Kelly and the Messengers on streaming platforms, the performance was first credited to simply "The Coloured Girls" on the B-side of the 1988 single "Don't Stand So Close to the Window", and credited to "Steve Connolly with the Messengers" on the 1992 compilation album Hidden Things.)
"Hard Times" (Stephen Foster cover)	Paul Kelly & Charlie Owen	Stephen Foster; Paul Kelly; Charlie Owen	Death's Dateless Night	2016	(Note: Listed as "Hard Times Come Again No More" in its APRA AMCOS registration.)
Happy Birthday, Ada Mae	Paul Kelly	Paul Kelly	Seventy	2025	
"Hasn't It Rained"	Paul Kelly featuring Vika & Linda Bull	Paul Kelly; Cameron Bruce; Bill McDonald; Ashley Naylor; Peter Luscombe; Vika Bull; Linda Bull	The Merri Soul Sessions	2014	
"He Can't Decide" ‡	Paul Kelly, Vika Bull, Renée Geyer & Deborah Conway	Paul Kelly; Martin Armiger	Seven Deadly Sins (Music from the ABC TV Series)	1992	
"Heartbreak Heartmend"	Kasey Chambers featuring Paul Kelly & Uncle Bill	Paul Kelly; Gerry Hale	The Captain (Special bonus edition)	2000	
"Heartbreak Heartmend"	Paul Kelly	Paul Kelly; Gerry Hale	Non-album single (B-side to "If I Could Start Today Again")	2002	
"Hearts Filled with Anger"	Debra Byrne	Debra Byrne; Paul Kelly	Sleeping Child	1994	
"Heavy Heart" # (You Am I cover)	Paul Kelly	Tim Rogers †	Non-album single (B-side to "If I Could Start Today Again")	2002	(Note: Subtitled "Live at Triple J Studios".)
"Heavy Thing"	Paul Kelly	Paul Kelly; Dan Kelly	Ways & Means	2004	
"Hello Melancholy, Hello Joy"	Paul Kelly	Paul Kelly	Fever Longing Still	2024	
"Hey"	Kasey Chambers with Paul Kelly	Kasey Chambers; Brandon Dodd; Harry Hookey; Imogen Clark †	Dragonfly	2017	
"Hey Boys" ‡	Mark Seymour & Paul Kelly	Mark Seymour †	Garbo (The Soundtrack from the Movie Starring Los Trios Ringbarkus)	1992	
"Hey Good Looking" (Hank Williams cover)	Paul Kelly	Hank Williams †	Forty Days	2020	
"Hidden Things"	Mary-Jo Starr	Paul Kelly	Too Many Movies	1990	(Note: A recording by Paul Kelly and the Messengers from 1988 is contained in the National Film and Sound Archive.)
"Hidden Things"	Kelly Willis	Paul Kelly	Bang Bang	1991	
"High Wild Ways"	Jane Clifton	Paul Kelly; Spencer P. Jones; Renée Geyer	The Marriage of Style	2003	
""Hope" Is the Thing with Feathers" (Emily Dickinson poem)	Paul Kelly, James Ledger, Alice Keath & Seraphim Trio	Emily Dickinson; Paul Kelly; James Ledger	Thirteen Ways to Look at Birds	2019	
""Hope" Is the Thing with Feathers" (Emily Dickinson poem)	Paul Kelly	Emily Dickinson; Paul Kelly; James Ledger	Forty Days	2020	
"Houndstooth Dress" ‡	Paul Kelly	Paul Kelly	Fever Longing Still	2024	
"How About Now"	Martin Armiger	Martin Armiger; Paul Kelly	Non-album single (B-side to "He Can't Decide")	1993	(Note: Subtitled "From 'Envy'".)
"How to Make Gravy" ‡	Paul Kelly	Paul Kelly	How to Make Gravy	1996	(Note: The song was re-recorded in 2021 and released as a single; this version (often subtitled "2021 Version") was included on Paul Kelly's Christmas Train in the same year.)
"How You Fall"	Troy Cassar-Daley	Troy Cassar-Daley; Paul Kelly	The World Today	2021	
"Hummin' to Myself" (Sammy Fain cover)	Paul Kelly	Sammy Fain; Herb Magidson; Monty Siegel †	Non-album single	2020	
"Humming Way"	Paul Kelly & Dan Luscombe featuring Soteria Bell	Paul Kelly; Dan Luscombe	Jindabyne (Original Motion Picture Soundtrack)	2006	
"I Can't Believe We Were Married"	Paul Kelly and the Messengers	Paul Kelly	Comedy	1991	
"I Can't Believe We Were Married"	Paul Kelly with Uncle Bill	Paul Kelly	Smoke	1999	
"I Can't Help It If I'm Still in Love with You" (Hank Williams cover)	Lucky Oceans & Paul Kelly	Hank Williams †	Purple Sky (Songs Originally by Hank Williams)	2019	
"I Close My Eyes and Think of You"	Paul Kelly	Paul Kelly	...Nothing but a Dream	2001	
"I Didn't Know Love Could Be Mine"	Vika & Linda	Paul Kelly	Vika & Linda	1994	(Note: A recording by Paul Kelly and the Dots from 1980, also known as "Starstruck", is contained in the National Film and Sound Archive.)
"I Don't Know What I'd Do"	Paul Kelly featuring Kira Puru	Paul Kelly	The Merri Soul Sessions	2014	
"I Don't Remember a Thing"	Paul Kelly and the Coloured Girls	Paul Kelly	Under the Sun	1987	
"I Don't Remember a Thing"	Paul Kelly with Uncle Bill	Paul Kelly	Smoke	1999	
"I Had Forgotten You"	Paul Kelly and the Messengers	Paul Kelly	So Much Water So Close to Home	1989	
"I Hate to Watch You Loving Him"	Paul Kelly and the Dots	Paul Kelly	Talk	1981	
"I Keep On Coming Back for More"	Paul Kelly	Paul Kelly	The A to Z Recordings	2010	(Note: A studio version was released on Kelly's 2025 album Seventy.)
"I Keep On Coming Back for More"	Paul Kelly featuring Clairy Browne	Paul Kelly	The Merri Soul Sessions	2014	(Note: Performed by "The Merri Souls", a studio band which includes Kelly on rhythm guitar and features various guest vocalists. Each song on The Merri Soul Sessions credits Kelly as the primary artist. This version was titled "Keep On Coming Back for More".)
"I Know Where to Go to Feel Good"	Vika & Linda	Paul Kelly	Vika & Linda	1994	(Note: A recording by Paul Kelly from 1993 is contained in the National Film and Sound Archive.)
"I Need Something Inside Me" #	Paul Kelly and the Dots	Paul Kelly; Chris Langman	Rocking Australia Live	1982	
"I See Red" #	High Rise Bombers	Paul Kelly	History Pt. 1	1979	
"I See Red" #	The Dots	Paul Kelly	The Dots	1979	
"I Smell Trouble"	The Boon Companions	Paul Kelly; Dan Kelly; Dan Luscombe; Peter Luscombe; Bill McDonald	Fireflies: The Songs of Paul Kelly (From the ABC TV Series)	2004	
"I Smell Trouble"	Paul Kelly	Paul Kelly	Life Is Fine	2017	
"I Still Pray"	Kasey Chambers featuring Paul Kelly & Uncle Bill	Kasey Chambers †	The Captain (Special bonus edition)	2000	
"I Was Hoping You'd Say That"	Paul Kelly	Paul Kelly	Live, May 1992	1992	(Note: A studio version was released on Kelly's 2000 EP Roll on Summer.)
"I Wasted Time"	Paul Kelly	Paul Kelly	...Nothing but a Dream	2001	
"I Will Lay Ye Doon, Love"	David Hobson featuring Paul Kelly	Traditional †	Enchanted Way	2010	
"I Wish It Would Rain"	Renée Geyer	Paul Kelly	Dedicated	2007	
"I Won't Be Torn Apart"	Paul Kelly and the Coloured Girls	Paul Kelly	Gossip	1986	
"I Won't Be Your Dog Anymore"	Paul Kelly and the Messengers	Paul Kelly	Comedy	1991	
"I'd Rather Go Blind"	Paul Kelly	Paul Kelly	How to Make Gravy	1996	(Note: Known as "I'd Rather Go Blind (Than See You with Another Guy)" upon its initial EP release, the song's title was shortened upon wider release on Kelly's 1998 album Words and Music.)
"I'll Be Your Lover"	Paul Kelly	Paul Kelly	How to Make Gravy	1996	(Note: Known as "I'll Be Your Lover Now" upon its initial EP release, the song's title was shortened upon wider release on Kelly's 1998 album Words and Music.)
"I'll Forgive You But I Won't Forget"	Paul Kelly	Paul Kelly	Deeper Water	1995	
"I'm Not Afraid of the Dark Anymore"	Paul Kelly, James Ledger, Genevieve Lacey & ANAM Musicians	Paul Kelly; James Ledger	Conversations with Ghosts	2013	(Note: Subtitled "Innisfree Reprise".)
"I'm Not Afraid of the Dark Anymore"	Paul Kelly	Paul Kelly; James Ledger	Seventy	2025	
"I'm On Your Side"	Paul Kelly	Paul Kelly; Dan Kelly	Spring and Fall	2012	
"I'm So Lonesome I Could Cry" (Hank Williams cover)	Kasey Chambers with Paul Kelly	Hank Williams †	Storybook	2011	
"I've Been a Fool"	Paul Kelly	Paul Kelly; Randy Jacobs	Deeper Water	1995	
"I've Come for Your Daughter"	Paul Kelly and the Coloured Girls	Paul Kelly	Gossip	1986	(Note: A recording by Paul Kelly and the Dots from 1980 is contained in the National Film and Sound Archive.)
"I've Had You"	Jenny Morris	Jenny Morris; Paul Kelly	Honeychild	1991	
"If I Could Start Today Again" ‡ (Note: The single version was the solo recording included on Kelly's 2001 album ...Nothing but a Dream.)	Vika & Linda	Paul Kelly	Two Wings	1999	
"If I Could Start Today Again" ‡	Paul Kelly	Paul Kelly	...Nothing but a Dream	2001	
"If I Could Start Today Again" ‡	Paul Kelly & Paul Grabowsky	Paul Kelly	Please Leave Your Light On	2020	
"If I Had My Way"	Four Hours Sleep with Paul Kelly	Bill McDonald; Paul Kelly	Love Specifics	2006	
"If Not Now" ‡	Paul Kelly	Paul Kelly; David McComb	Non-album single	2023	
"Imagine the World"	Deborah Conway & Paul Kelly	Martin Armiger; Paul Kelly	Seven Deadly Sins (Music from the ABC TV Series)	1993	
"In the Hot Sun of a Christmas Day"	Paul Kelly	Gilberto Gil; Caetano Veloso †	Paul Kelly's Christmas Train	2021	
"In the Land Where We'll Never Grow Old"	Vika & Linda with Paul Kelly	James Cleveland Moore †	Sunday (The Gospel According to Iso)	2020	
"In the Perfect World"	Mick Thomas and the Sure Thing	Paul Kelly; Mick Thomas	Spin! Spin! Spin! (Casino Trousers bonus disc)	2009	
"Incident on South Dowling"	Paul Kelly	Paul Kelly	Post	1985	
"Incident on South Dowling"	Paul Kelly and the Coloured Girls	Paul Kelly	Gossip	1986	
"International Kapital"	High Rise Bombers	Unknown	History Pt. 1	1979	
"Into Temptation" # (Crowded House cover)	Neil Finn & Paul Kelly	Neil Finn †	Goin' Your Way	2013	
"Intonent Hodie"	Alice Keath & Paul Kelly	Traditional; Alice Keath †	Paul Kelly's Christmas Train	2021	
"Invisible Me"	Paul Kelly and the Messengers	Paul Kelly	Comedy	1991	
"Is It a He or a She?"	Paul Kelly & Gerry Hale	Paul Kelly; Gerry Hale	Silent Partner (Original Motion Picture Soundtrack)	2001	
"It Doesn't Work That Way"	Deborah Conway & Willy Zygier featuring Paul Kelly	Deborah Conway; Willy Zygier †	Summertown	2004	
"It Matters to Me"	Ross Wilson	Ross Wilson; Paul Kelly	Country & Wilson	2003	
"It Started with a Kiss" (Hot Chocolate cover)	Paul Kelly	Errol Brown †	Songs from the South: Paul Kelly's Greatest Hits (Bonus disc edition)	1997	(Note: First recorded for the bonus disc of Kelly's 1997 greatest hits album Songs from the South, it was also included on his 1998 studio album Words and Music.)
"It Wasn't Night or Day"	Paul Kelly & Megan Washington	Paul Kelly; Megan Washington	Sundowner	2011	(Note: A separate, minute-long instrumental track was also recorded for the release, identically named but for the subtitle "(Instrumental)".)
"It's All Downhill from Here"	Paul Kelly and the Messengers	Paul Kelly	Comedy	1991	
"Jindabyne Fair"	Katie Brianna and the Stormwater Boys	Paul Kelly	Jindabyne (Original Motion Picture Soundtrack)	2006	
"John Pat"	Archie Roach	Archie Roach; Jack Davis †	Journey	2007	(Note: Duet between Roach and Kelly; Kelly's vocals are credited in the liner notes of Journey.)
"Josephina"	Paul Kelly	Paul Kelly	Life Is Fine	2017	
"Jump to Love"	Christine Anu	Christine Anu; Paul Kelly; Stuart Crichton	Come My Way	2000	
"Jump to Love"	Paul Kelly	Christine Anu; Paul Kelly; Stuart Crichton	...Nothing but a Dream (...The Gift That Keeps on Giving bonus disc edition)	2002	
"Just a Phrase He's Going Through"	Mary-Jo Starr	Paul Kelly	Too Many Movies	1990	
"Just About to Break" ‡	Paul Kelly	Paul Kelly	...Nothing but a Dream	2001	
"Just for You (Jilya Version)"	Kev Carmody featuring Paul Kelly, Colin Hay, Jess Hitchcock, Chris Cheney & Stu MacLeod	Kev Carmody †	Non-album single	2022	
"Just Like Animals"	Paul Kelly	Paul Kelly	Live, May 1992	1992	(Note: A studio version was released on Kelly's 1994 album Wanted Man.)
"Keep It to Yourself" ‡	Paul Kelly and the Messengers	Paul Kelly	Comedy	1991	
"Keep On Driving"	Paul Kelly	Paul Kelly	Stolen Apples	2007	
"Khawaja"	Paul Kelly	Paul Kelly; Fred Rose; Hank Williams	Non-album single	2023	
"Khe Sanh" (Cold Chisel cover)	Paul Kelly	Don Walker †	Standing on the Outside: The Songs of Cold Chisel	2007	
"Killer Lover"	Renée Geyer	Paul Kelly	Sweet Life	1999	
"King of Fools"	Paul Kelly	Paul Kelly	Ways & Means	2004	
"Kissed Your Smile"	Lozz Benson featuring Paul Kelly	Lauren Benson; Paul Kelly	Non-album single	2016	
"Know Your Friends"	Paul Kelly and the Coloured Girls	Paul Kelly	Under the Sun	1987	
"Labour Yard"	Paul Kelly & Shane O'Mara	Paul Kelly	Everynight... Everynight	1996	
"Lady with Dog"	Stardust Five	Dan Kelly; Paul Kelly; Dan Luscombe; Peter Luscombe; Bill McDonald	Stardust Five	2006	
"Lament" (Nick Cave and the Bad Seeds cover)	Paul Kelly & Adalita	Nick Cave †	Straight to You: Triple J's Tribute to Nick Cave	2012	
"Lantana"	Paul Kelly with Shane O'Mara, Steve Hadley, Bruce Haymes & Peter Luscombe	Paul Kelly; Shane O'Mara; Steve Hadley; Bruce Haymes; Peter Luscombe	Lantana (Music for the Feature Film)	2001	(Note: The recording is split into "Part 1" and "Part 2" on the soundtrack release.)
"Last Night"	David Hirschfelder & David Hobson	David Hirschfelder; David Hobson; Paul Kelly	Inside This Room	1999	
"Last Orders"	Stardust Five	Dan Kelly; Paul Kelly; Dan Luscombe; Peter Luscombe; Bill McDonald	Stardust Five	2006	
"Last to Know"	Deborah Conway	Deborah Conway; Paul Kelly	String of Pearls	1991	
"Last Train"	Christine Anu with Paul Kelly	Paul Kelly; Angelique Cooper; Peter Crosbie	Non-album single	1993	
"Last Train to Heaven"	Paul Kelly and the Coloured Girls	Paul Kelly	Gossip	1986	
"Lately"	Paul Kelly	Paul Kelly; Renée Geyer	Wanted Man	1994	
"Laughing Boy"	Weddings Parties Anything	Paul Kelly	Goat Dancing on the Tables	1988	
"Laughing Boy"	Paul Kelly	Paul Kelly	People	2023	(Note: A studio recording by Paul Kelly and the Dots from 1980 is contained in the National Film and Sound Archive, as is a live recording from 1982, performed alongside Jo Jo Zep and the Falcons at the Mushroom Evolution Concert. The song's lyrics are printed in the Post chapter of Kelly's various lyrics compendiums, subtitled "For Brendan Behan". A solo performance was eventually recorded on Kelly's 2023 compilation album People.)
"Leah: The Sequel"	Paul Kelly	Paul Kelly; Bill Miller; Roy Orbison	Life Is Fine	2017	
"Leaps and Bounds" ‡	Paul Kelly and the Coloured Girls	Paul Kelly; Chris Langman	Gossip	1986	
"Leaving Her for the Last Time"	Paul Kelly and the Messengers	Steve Connolly †	Comedy	1991	
"Leda and the Swan" (W. B. Yeats poem)	Paul Kelly, James Ledger, Alice Keath & Seraphim Trio	W. B. Yeats; Paul Kelly; James Ledger	Thirteen Ways to Look at Birds	2019	
"Lenny (To Live Is to Burn)"	Paul Kelly and the Dots	Paul Kelly; Lenny Bruce	Manila	1982	
"Let It Be" (The Beatles cover)	Paul Kelly & Charlie Owen	Lennon–McCartney †	Death's Dateless Night	2016	
"Let Me In"	Vika & Linda	Paul Kelly; Renée Geyer	Two Wings	1999	
"Let's Fall Again"	Paul Kelly	Paul Kelly; Dan Kelly; Dan Luscombe; Peter Luscombe; Bill McDonald	Ways & Means	2004	
"Let's Tangle"	Paul Kelly with Shane O'Mara, Steve Hadley, Bruce Haymes & Peter Luscombe	Paul Kelly; Shane O'Mara; Steve Hadley; Bruce Haymes; Peter Luscombe	Lantana (Music for the Feature Film)	2001	
"Let's Work It Out in Bed"	Paul Kelly	Paul Kelly	Fever Longing Still	2024	
"Letter in the Rain"	Paul Kelly	Paul Kelly	Life Is Fine	2017	
"Life Is Fine" (Langston Hughes poem)	Paul Kelly	Langston Hughes; Paul Kelly	Life Is Fine	2017	
"Light on the Hill" (Casey Bennetto cover)	Paul Kelly	Casey Bennetto †	People	2023	
"Little Aches and Pains"	Paul Kelly	Paul Kelly	Spring and Fall	2012	
"Little Bit o' Sugar"	Paul Kelly	Paul Kelly; Dan Kelly	Won't You Come Around	2003	
"Little Bones"	Kaarin Fairfax	Mairead Hannan; Paul Kelly	One Night the Moon	2001	
"Little Boy Don't Lose Your Balls"	Paul Kelly and the Messengers	Paul Kelly	Comedy	1991	
"Little Boy Don't Lose Your Balls"	Paul Kelly & Gerry Hale	Paul Kelly	Silent Partner (Original Motion Picture Soundtrack)	2001	
"Little Boy Don't Lose Your Balls"	Paul Kelly and the Stormwater Boys	Paul Kelly	Foggy Highway	2005	
"Little Decisions"	Paul Kelly	Paul Kelly	Post	1985	
"Little Decisions"	Paul Kelly and the Messengers	Paul Kelly	Hidden Things (B-side to "Forty Miles to Saturday Night")	1992	
"Little Drummer Boy" (Harry Simeone Chorale cover)	Paul Kelly	Harry Simeone; Katherine Kennicott Davis; Henry Onorati †	Paul Kelly's Christmas Train	2021	
"Little Kings"	Paul Kelly	Paul Kelly	Words and Music	1998	
"Little Red Corvette" # (Prince cover)	Paul Kelly	Prince Nelson †	Andrew Denton's Musical Challenge 2: Even More Challenged!	2001	
"Little Things"	Ziggy Ramo featuring Paul Kelly	Paul Kelly; Kev Carmody; Ziggy Ramo	Human?	2024	
"Little Wolf"	Paul Kelly	Paul Kelly	Nature	2018	
"Livin' On"	Pez featuring Paul Kelly	Perry Chapman; Paul Kelly; Mark Raymer	Don't Look Down	2016	
"Living Is So Easy"	Rick Steele	Rick Steele †	Through My Eyes	2008	(Note: Kelly is credited with performing backing vocals in the album's liner notes.)
"Lonely Boy"	Sherry Rich	Sherry Rich; Garth Porter; Paul Kelly	Sherry Rich & Courtesy Move	1997	
"Lonesome but Free"	Troy Cassar-Daley	Troy Cassar-Daley; Paul Kelly	Brighter Day	2005	
"Lonesome, Lonely & Alone"	Mary-Jo Starr	Paul Kelly	Non-album single	1990	
"Long As I Don't See You"	Troy Cassar-Daley	Troy Cassar-Daley; Paul Kelly	Brighter Day	2005	
"Look So Fine, Feel So Low" ‡ (Note: The single version was the Coloured Girls recording included on Kelly's 1986 album Gossip.)	Paul Kelly	Paul Kelly	Post	1985	
"Look So Fine, Feel So Low" ‡	Paul Kelly and the Coloured Girls	Paul Kelly	Gossip	1986	
"Los Cucumbros"	The Boon Companions with Sian Prior	Paul Kelly; Dan Kelly; Dan Luscombe; Peter Luscombe; Bill McDonald	Fireflies: The Songs of Paul Kelly (From the ABC TV Series)	2004	(Note: Re-released in 2006 as a performance by Stardust Five and included on their self-titled album.)
"Lost on the River"	Peter Blakeley	Peter Blakeley; Paul Kelly	Harry's Cafe de Wheels	1989	
"Love Has Made a Fool of Me"	Paul Kelly	Paul Kelly	Fever Longing Still	2024	
"Love Is the Law" ‡	Paul Kelly	Paul Kelly	Non-album single	1983	(Note: Released on a promotional 7-inch single in support of the 1983 film Midnite Spares. An unreleased recording by Paul Kelly and the Dots from 1980 is contained in the National Film and Sound Archive.)
"Love Is the Law" ‡	Paul Kelly featuring Bic Runga	Paul Kelly	...Nothing but a Dream	2001	
"Love Letter"	Professor Ratbaggy	Paul Kelly	Professor Ratbaggy	1999	
"Love Never Runs on Time" ‡	Paul Kelly	Paul Kelly	Wanted Man	1994	
"Lovers' Field"	Stardust Five	Dan Kelly; Paul Kelly; Dan Luscombe; Peter Luscombe; Bill McDonald	Stardust Five	2006	
"Lowdown" ‡	High Rise Bombers	Paul Kelly	History Pt. 1	1979	
"Lowdown" ‡	The Dots	Paul Kelly	The Dots	1979	(Note: A studio version titled "The Lowdown" was released as a single in 1981 by Paul Kelly and the Dots ahead of its inclusion on Talk.)
"Luck"	Paul Kelly	Paul Kelly	Post	1985	
"Lucky Bastard"	Colin Hay	Colin Hay; Paul Kelly	Company of Strangers	2002	
"Made for Me"	Paul Kelly featuring Rebecca Barnard	Paul Kelly	Seventy	2025	
"Made for You"	Thelma Plum	Thelma Plum; Paul Kelly; David Kahne; Paul McCartney	Better in Blak	2019	
"Madeleine's Song"	Paul Kelly	Paul Kelly	Deeper Water	1995	
"Mama Shake That Thing"	Vika & Linda	Vika Bull; Linda Bull; Paul Kelly	Princess Tabu	1996	
"Man Is Just a Boy"	Jo Jo Zep	Joe Camilleri; Paul Kelly; Simon Gyllies	Cha	1982	
"Mannish Woman"	Professor Ratbaggy	Steve Hadley; Bruce Haymes; Paul Kelly; Peter Luscombe	Professor Ratbaggy	1999	
"Maralinga (Rainy Land)"	Paul Kelly and the Coloured Girls	Paul Kelly	Gossip	1986	
"Maybe This Christmas" (Ron Sexsmith cover)	Paul Kelly	Ron Sexsmith †	Paul Kelly's Christmas Train (2022 edition)	2022	
"Maybe This Time"	Vika Bull with Renée Geyer & Deborah Conway	Paul Kelly; Martin Armiger	Seven Deadly Sins (Music from the ABC TV Series)	1993	
"Maybe This Time for Sure"	Paul Kelly	Paul Kelly	Wanted Man	1994	
"Meet Me in the Middle of the Air"	Paul Kelly and the Stormwater Boys	Paul Kelly	Foggy Highway	2005	(Note: An unreleased recording by Paul Kelly and the Boon Companions was written for and performed in the opening scene of the 2004 film Tom White.)
"Meet Me in the Middle of the Air"	Paul Kelly & Charlie Owen	Paul Kelly	Death's Dateless Night	2016	
"Melbourne Girls" #	Paul Kelly	Paul Kelly	Non-album single (B-side to "Song from the Sixteenth Floor")	1994	
"Melting" ‡	Paul Kelly with Monique Brumby	Paul Kelly; Monique Brumby	Songs from the South: Paul Kelly's Greatest Hits (Bonus disc edition)	1997	
"Merry Christmas Everybody" # (Slade cover)	RocKwiz Orkestra featuring Liam Finn, Jade MacRae, Tex Perkins, Clare Bowditch, Chelsea Wheatley, Angie Hart, Tim Freedman, Paul Kelly & The Wolfgramm Sisters	Noddy Holder; Jim Lea †	The Christmas Album	2015	
"Message to My Girl" # (Split Enz cover)	Neil Finn & Paul Kelly	Neil Finn †	Goin' Your Way	2013	
"Mi Camion Mi Casa"	Stardust Five	Dan Kelly; Paul Kelly; Dan Luscombe; Peter Luscombe; Bill McDonald	Stardust Five	2006	
"Midnight Rain"	Paul Kelly	Paul Kelly; Wendy Matthews	...Nothing but a Dream	2001	
"Miles to Go"	Nick Barker and the Reptiles	Nick Barker; Paul Kelly	After the Show	1991	
"Mirror"	Paul Kelly & Dan Luscombe featuring Soteria Bell	Paul Kelly; Dan Luscombe	Jindabyne (Original Motion Picture Soundtrack)	2006	
"Moni, Make It Good"	Professor Ratbaggy	Steve Hadley; Bruce Haymes; Paul Kelly; Peter Luscombe	Professor Ratbaggy	1999	
"Moon in the Bed"	Paul Kelly and the Messengers	Paul Kelly	So Much Water So Close to Home	1989	
"Moon River" # (Audrey Hepburn cover)	Neil Finn & Paul Kelly	Henry Mancini; Johnny Mercer †	Goin' Your Way	2013	
"Morning Fishing"	Paul Kelly & Dan Luscombe featuring Soteria Bell	Paul Kelly; Dan Luscombe	Jindabyne (Original Motion Picture Soundtrack)	2006	
"Morning Storm"	Paul Kelly	Paul Kelly	Nature	2018	
"Most Wanted Man in the World" ‡	Paul Kelly and the Messengers	Paul Kelly	So Much Water So Close to Home	1989	
"Movin' On"	Steve Lucas featuring Paul Kelly	Steve Lucas; Ian Rilen †	Bread and Water	1993	
"Mudlarking"	Paul Kelly, James Ledger, Alice Keath & Seraphim Trio	Paul Kelly; James Ledger	Thirteen Ways to Look at Birds	2019	
"Murmuration"	Paul Kelly, James Ledger, Alice Keath & Seraphim Trio	Paul Kelly; James Ledger	Thirteen Ways to Look at Birds	2019	
"Mushrooms" (Sylvia Plath poem)	Paul Kelly	Sylvia Plath; Paul Kelly	Nature	2018	
"Must've Been a Hell of a Party" (Slim Dusty cover)	Sara Storer featuring Paul Kelly	Slim Dusty; Tom Oliver †	Firefly	2005	
"My Body Felt No Pain"	Paul Kelly	Paul Kelly	Seventy	2025	
"My Boy Before"	Wendy Matthews	Wendy Matthews; Michael Szumowski; Paul Kelly	Beautiful View	2001	
"My Heart Still Burns for You"	Troy Cassar-Daley	Troy Cassar-Daley; Paul Kelly	The World Today	2021	
"My Island Home" (Warumpi Band cover)	Paul Kelly	Neil Murray †	Forty Days	2020	
"My Man's Got a Cold"	Paul Kelly featuring Vika Bull	Paul Kelly	Life Is Fine	2017	
"My True Love Hath My Heart" (Philip Sidney poem)	Paul Kelly featuring Vika Bull	Philip Sidney; William Shakespeare; Paul Kelly	Seven Sonnets & a Song	2016	
"My Way Is to You"	Paul Kelly	Paul Kelly; Dan Kelly	Ways & Means	2004	
"Native Born" (Archie Roach cover)	Paul Kelly	Archie Roach †	Songs for Australia	2020	
"Nativity" (John Donne poem)	Paul Kelly	John Donne; Paul Kelly	Paul Kelly's Christmas Train	2021	
"New Found Year"	Paul Kelly	Paul Kelly; Dan Kelly	Spring and Fall	2012	
"Night After Night"	Paul Kelly with Uncle Bill	Paul Kelly	Smoke	1999	
"Night Ride"	Paul Kelly, James Ledger, Genevieve Lacey & ANAM Musicians	Paul Kelly; James Ledger	Conversations with Ghosts	2013	
"Night River"	Paul Kelly & Dan Luscombe featuring Soteria Bell	Paul Kelly; Dan Luscombe	Jindabyne (Original Motion Picture Soundtrack)	2006	
"Nightwatchman"	Stardust Five	Dan Kelly; Paul Kelly; Dan Luscombe; Peter Luscombe; Bill McDonald	Stardust Five	2006	
"Ninety Nine Years"	Vika & Linda	Vika Bull; Linda Bull; Paul Kelly	Vika & Linda	1994	(Note: Included in the Comedy chapter of Kelly's Lyrics book under the title "Thanks I'll Think It Over".)
"No You"	Paul Kelly and the Messengers	Paul Kelly	So Much Water So Close to Home	1989	
"Nobody's Baby Now" (Nick Cave and the Bad Seeds cover)	Paul Kelly	Nick Cave †	Won't You Come Around	2003	
"None of Your Business Now"	Paul Kelly	Paul Kelly	Spring and Fall	2012	
"Northern Rivers"	Paul Kelly	Paul Kelly	Rivers and Rain	2022	(Note: First recorded for Kelly's 2022 compilation album Rivers and Rain, it was also included on his 2024 studio album Fever Longing Still.)
"Not the Girl You Think You Are" # (Crowded House cover)	Neil Finn & Paul Kelly	Neil Finn †	Goin' Your Way	2013	
"Nothing but a Dream"	Paul Kelly	Paul Kelly; Dan Kelly	Ways & Means	2004	
"Nothing on My Mind" ‡	Paul Kelly	Paul Kelly; Peter Luscombe; Steve Hadley	Words and Music	1998	
"Now That Our Babies Have Grown"	Pesky Bones featuring Paul Kelly & Rebecca Barnard	Peter Farnan †	Volume One	2016	
"Now's Not the Time for a Hot Sea Bath"	Paul Kelly & Gerry Hale	Paul Kelly; Gerry Hale	Silent Partner (Original Motion Picture Soundtrack)	2001	
"Nukkanya"	Paul Kelly	Paul Kelly	Wanted Man	1994	
"Nukkanya"	Paul Kelly and the Stormwater Boys	Paul Kelly	Jindabyne (Original Motion Picture Soundtrack)	2006	
"Nukkanya"	Paul Kelly & Charlie Owen	Paul Kelly	Death's Dateless Night	2016	
"Numb"	Paul Kelly with Shane O'Mara, Steve Hadley, Bruce Haymes & Peter Luscombe	Paul Kelly; Shane O'Mara; Steve Hadley; Bruce Haymes; Peter Luscombe	Lantana (Music for the Feature Film)	2001	
"Nyul Nyul Girl" #	The Black Arm Band featuring Archie Roach, Paul Kelly, Shane Howard & Stephen Pigram	Jimmy Chi †	Murandak Live	2006	
"O Mistress Mine" (William Shakespeare cover)	Paul Kelly	William Shakespeare; Paul Kelly	Spring and Fall (Hidden track)	2012	(Note: First included as a bonus track on Kelly's 2012 album Spring and Fall, it was re-released on his 2016 album Seven Sonnets & a Song with the subtitle "Clown's Song from Twelfth Night".)
"Ode to a Nightingale" (John Keats poem)	Paul Kelly	John Keats; Paul Kelly; James Ledger	Loudspeaker: Native Tongue	1996	
"Ode to a Nightingale" (John Keats poem)	Paul Kelly, James Ledger, Alice Keath & Seraphim Trio	John Keats; Paul Kelly; James Ledger	Thirteen Ways to Look at Birds	2019	
"Oh, Death"	Professor Ratbaggy	Traditional; Steve Hadley; Bruce Haymes; Paul Kelly; Peter Luscombe	Professor Ratbaggy	1999	
"On the Cross"	Paul Kelly & Shane O'Mara	Paul Kelly	Everynight... Everynight	1996	
"On the Leffy"	Dan Sultan	Dan Sultan; Paul Kelly	Dirty Ground	2014	
"Once in a Lifetime, Snow" (Les Murray poem)	Paul Kelly, James Ledger, Genevieve Lacey & ANAM Musicians	Les Murray; Paul Kelly	Conversations with Ghosts	2013	
"Once in a Lifetime, Snow" (Les Murray poem)	Paul Kelly	Les Murray; Paul Kelly	Love Is Strong as Death	2019	
"One Blood"	Yothu Yindi	Mandawuy Yunupingu; Paul Kelly	One Blood	1999	
"One David Gower"	Paul Kelly and the Messengers	Paul Kelly	Comedy (Hidden track)	1991	
"One More Tune"	Paul Kelly	Paul Kelly	The A to Z Recordings	2010	(Note: A studio version was released on Kelly's 2022 compilation album Drinking.)
"One Need Not a Chamber to Be Haunted" (Emily Dickinson poem)	Paul Kelly, James Ledger, Genevieve Lacey & ANAM Musicians	Emily Dickinson; Paul Kelly; James Ledger	Conversations with Ghosts	2013	
"One Night the Moon"	Kaarin Fairfax & Memphis Kelly	Paul Kelly; John Romeril	One Night the Moon	2001	
"One Step Ahead" # (Split Enz cover)	Neil Finn & Paul Kelly	Neil Finn †	Goin' Your Way	2013	
"Only Talking Sense" # (Finn cover)	Neil Finn & Paul Kelly	Neil Finn; Tim Finn †	Goin' Your Way	2013	
"Only the Lonely Hearted"	Jo Jo Zep and the Falcons	Paul Kelly	Screaming Targets	1979	
"Only the Lonely Hearted"	Paul Kelly and the Dots	Paul Kelly	Rocking Australia Live	1982	(Note: A recording by Paul Kelly and the Dots from 1979, titled "What's That Beat", is contained in the National Film and Sound Archive.)
"Other People's Houses"	Paul Kelly and the Messengers	Paul Kelly	Hidden Things (B-side to "Pouring Petrol on a Burning Man")	1992	
"Our Sunshine"	Paul Kelly with Uncle Bill	Paul Kelly; Mick Thomas	Smoke	1999	(Note: Initially released as a B-side to Kelly's 1998 single "I'll Be Your Lover".)
"Pallet on Your Floor"	Paul Kelly & Charlie Owen	Traditional; Paul Kelly	Death's Dateless Night	2016	(Note: Also known as "Make Me a Pallet on Your Floor".)
"Paradise" (John Prine cover)	Paul Kelly	John Prine †	Forty Days	2020	
"Passed Over"	Paul Kelly and the Stormwater Boys	Paul Kelly	Foggy Highway	2005	
"Passed Over"	Paul Kelly	Paul Kelly	Forty Days	2020	(Note: A solo recording by Kelly from 2003 on a pre-master CD is contained in the National Film and Sound Archive.)
"Pastures of Plenty" (Woody Guthrie cover)	Paul Kelly and the Coloured Girls	Woody Guthrie †	Under the Sun (Australian CD edition)	1987	(Note: Initially released as a B-side to the 1987 single "Look So Fine, Feel So Low".)
"Petrichor"	Paul Kelly	Paul Kelly	Life Is Fine	2017	
"Petrichor"	Paul Kelly & Paul Grabowsky	Paul Kelly	Please Leave Your Light On	2020	
"Pick It Up and Pass It On"	David & Anne Kirkpatrick	Paul Kelly	Reunion	2008	
"Pied Beauty" (Gerard Manley Hopkins poem)	Paul Kelly	Gerard Manley Hopkins; Paul Kelly	Non-album single (B-side to "How to Make Gravy" 7-inch vinyl)	2021	
"Pigeon / Jandamurra"	Paul Kelly and the Messengers	Paul Kelly	So Much Water So Close to Home	1989	(Note: Initial releases of the song spelled the title as "Jundamurra"; the preferred transcription of "Jandamurra" was first used on 2010's The A to Z Recordings.)
"Play Me"	Renée Geyer featuring Paul Kelly	Paul Kelly	Sweet Life	1999	(Note: First referenced in the Comedy chapter of Kelly's 1993 Lyrics book.)
"Please Leave Your Light On"	Paul Kelly	Paul Kelly	Stolen Apples	2007	
"Please Leave Your Light On"	Paul Kelly & Paul Grabowsky	Paul Kelly	Please Leave Your Light On	2020	
"Please Myself"	Professor Ratbaggy	Steve Hadley; Bruce Haymes; Paul Kelly; Peter Luscombe	Professor Ratbaggy	1999	
"Please Send Me"	Paul Kelly and the Dots	Chris Dyson †	Talk	1981	(Note: Although the song is credited to Paul Kelly and the Dots, Kelly himself does not appear on the track, with vocals provided by songwriter Chris Dyson.)
"Porno Rose"	High Rise Bombers	Paul Kelly	History Pt. 1	1979	
"Pouring Petrol on a Burning Man" ‡	Paul Kelly and the Messengers	Paul Kelly	Hidden Things	1992	(Note: First released as a standalone single in 1990.)
"Power Lines"	Paul Kelly & Dan Luscombe featuring Soteria Bell	Paul Kelly; Dan Luscombe	Jindabyne (Original Motion Picture Soundtrack)	2006	
"Preaching to the Converted"	Paul Kelly and the Coloured Girls	Paul Kelly	Non-album single (B-side to "Darling It Hurts")	1986	
"Pretty Bird Tree" (L. J. Hill cover)	Paul Kelly & Charlie Owen	Lawrence John Hill †	Death's Dateless Night	2016	
"Private Universe" # (Crowded House cover)	Neil Finn & Paul Kelly	Neil Finn †	Goin' Your Way	2013	
"Promise Not to Tell"	Paul Kelly and the Dots	Paul Kelly	Talk	1981	
"Proud Songsters" (Thomas Hardy poem)	Paul Kelly, James Ledger, Alice Keath & Seraphim Trio	Thomas Hardy; Paul Kelly; James Ledger	Thirteen Ways to Look at Birds	2019	
"Pub with No Beer" (Slim Dusty cover)	Paul Kelly	Gordon Parsons †	Forty Days	2020	
"Purple Mountain"	Kiri and Lou featuring Chris O'Connor, Don McGlashan & Paul Kelly	Don McGlashan; Harry Sinclair †	Kiri and Lou Singalongle Songles	2021	
"Pussy Got Your Tongue"	Stardust Five	Dan Kelly; Paul Kelly; Dan Luscombe; Peter Luscombe; Bill McDonald; Tania Lacy	Stardust Five	2006	(Note: A solo version recorded by Kelly in 2000 as part of a demos collection for ...Nothing but a Dream is contained in the National Film and Sound Archive.)
"Quarantine" (Eavan Boland poem)	Paul Kelly	Eavan Boland; Paul Kelly	Love Is Strong as Death	2019	(Note: A re-recorded version was included on Kelly's 2020 album Forty Days.)
"Queen Stone" (Maurice Frawley and Working Class Ringos cover)	Paul Kelly	Maurice Frawley; Shane Walsh †	Deeper Water	1995	
"Radio Show"	High Rise Bombers	Martin Armiger †	History Pt. 1	1979	
"Raining Pleasure" # (The Triffids cover)	Paul Kelly with New Buffalo	David McComb; James Paterson †	Stolen Apples ('Very special edition' live disc)	2007	
"Rally Round the Drum"	Paul Kelly and the Messengers	Paul Kelly; Archie Roach	Hidden Things (B-side to "When I First Met Your Ma")	1992	
"Rally Round the Drum"	Paul Kelly and the Stormwater Boys	Paul Kelly; Archie Roach	Foggy Highway	2005	
"Rally Round the Drum"	Archie Roach featuring Paul Kelly	Paul Kelly; Archie Roach	Tell Me Why	2019	
"Randwick Bells"	Paul Kelly and the Coloured Girls	Paul Kelly	Gossip	1986	
"Rank Stranger" (The Stanley Brothers cover)	Paul Kelly and the Stormwater Boys	Albert E. Brumley †	Foggy Highway (Limited 2 CD edition)	2005	
"Reckless" (Australian Crawl cover)	Paul Kelly and the Coloured Girls	James Reyne †	Hidden Things (B-side to "Dumb Things")	1992	
"Recognition"	The Dots	Paul Kelly	The Dots	1979	(Note: A re-recorded version was included on Paul Kelly and the Dots' 1981 album Talk.)
"Rehab" # (Amy Winehouse cover)	Paul Kelly	Amy Winehouse †	Triple J's Like a Version Four	2008	
"Right Outta My Head"	Paul Kelly	Paul Kelly; Dan Kelly	Stolen Apples	2007	
"Righteous Woman"	Paul Kelly	Paul Kelly	The Merri Soul Sessions	2014	
"Ring Out, Wild Bells" (Alfred, Lord Tennyson poem)	Paul Kelly, James Ledger, Genevieve Lacey & ANAM Musicians	Alfred, Lord Tennyson; Paul Kelly; James Ledger	Conversations with Ghosts	2013	(Note: Subtitled as "(From 'In Memoriam')".)
"Rise & Shine"	Professor Ratbaggy	Steve Hadley; Bruce Haymes; Paul Kelly; Peter Luscombe	Professor Ratbaggy	1999	
"Rising Moon"	Billy Miller & Paul Kelly	Paul Kelly; Billy Miller	Australia	2015	
"Rising Moon"	Paul Kelly	Paul Kelly; Billy Miller	Life Is Fine	2017	
"Rita Wrote a Letter" ‡	Paul Kelly	Paul Kelly; Dan Kelly	Seventy	2025	
"Road to the North"	Stardust Five	Paul Kelly; Dan Luscombe; Peter Luscombe; Bill McDonald	Stardust Five	2006	
"Rock 'n' Soul"	Paul Kelly and the Coloured Girls	Jon Schofield †	Hidden Things (B-side to "Dumb Things")	1989	
"Rock Out on the Sea"	Paul Kelly	Paul Kelly; Billy Miller	Life Is Fine	2017	
"Rocking Institution" ‡	Paul Kelly and the Dots	Paul Kelly; Chris Langman	Non-album single (Split single with Jo Kennedy)	1982	
"Rocks"	Paul Kelly & Dan Luscombe featuring Soteria Bell	Paul Kelly; Dan Luscombe	Jindabyne (Original Motion Picture Soundtrack)	2006	
"Roll On Summer"	Paul Kelly featuring Kirsty Stegwazi	Paul Kelly	Roll On Summer	2000	
"Royal Road"	Paul Kelly & Gerry Hale	Paul Kelly; Gerry Hale	Silent Partner (Original Motion Picture Soundtrack)	2001	
"Sailing for the Dead Sea"	High Rise Bombers	Unknown	History Pt. 1	1979	
"Sailing to Byzantium" (W. B. Yeats poem)	Paul Kelly, James Ledger, Genevieve Lacey & ANAM Musicians	W. B. Yeats; Paul Kelly; James Ledger	Conversations with Ghosts	2013	
"Sailing to Byzantium" (W. B. Yeats poem)	Paul Kelly	W. B. Yeats; Paul Kelly; James Ledger	Love Is Strong as Death	2019	(Note: A re-recorded version was released on Kelly's 2025 album Seventy.)
"Same Old Walk"	Paul Kelly and the Coloured Girls	Paul Kelly	Under the Sun	1987	
"Satisfy Your Woman"	Paul Kelly	Paul Kelly	Post	1985	
"Saturday Night and Sunday Morning" ‡	Paul Kelly	Paul Kelly	Words and Music	1998	
"Seagulls of Seattle"	Paul Kelly	Paul Kelly	Nature	2018	(Note: First referenced in the Spring and Fall chapter of Kelly's 2012 book Don't Start Me Talking: Lyrics 1984–2012.)
"Second Time Around"	Sara Storer	Sara Storer; Paul Kelly	Silver Skies	2007	
"See the Birdie Fly Out"	Professor Ratbaggy	Steve Hadley; Bruce Haymes; Paul Kelly; Peter Luscombe	Professor Ratbaggy	1999	
"See You in Paradise"	Paul Kelly and the Dots	Paul Kelly	Manila	1982	(Note: Subtitled in liner notes with "With Respect to G. P.".)
"Seeing Is Believing" ‡	Paul Kelly and the Dots	Paul Kelly; Chris Langman	Non-album single	1980	
"Self Deceiver"	Jenny Morris	Jenny Morris; Paul Kelly	Shiver	1989	
"September 1, 1939 (Last Verse)" (W. H. Auden poem)	Paul Kelly	W. H. Auden; Paul Kelly	Forty Days	2020	
"Shalom Alechiem"	Lior, Alice Keath, Emily Lubitz & Paul Kelly	Traditional; Israel Goldfarb; Alice Keath; Paul Kelly; Lior Attar	Paul Kelly's Christmas Train	2021	
"Shane Warne"	Paul Kelly	Paul Kelly; Denis Preston; Edmundo Ros; Aldwyn Roberts	Songs from the South Vol. 2: 98–07	2008	
"She Answers the Sun (Lazybones")	Paul Kelly with Rebecca Barnard	Paul Kelly	Words and Music	1998	
"She Will Have Her Way" # (Neil Finn cover)	Neil Finn & Paul Kelly	Neil Finn †	Goin' Your Way	2013	
"She's a Melody (Stupid Song)"	Paul Kelly and the Messengers	Paul Kelly	So Much Water So Close to Home	1989	(Note: Also known on later live releases as simply "Stupid Song".)
"She's Got It"	High Rise Bombers	Unknown	History Pt. 1	1979	
"She's Rare"	Paul Kelly	Paul Kelly	Wanted Man	1994	
"She's the One"	High Rise Bombers	Paul Kelly	History Pt. 1	1979	
"Sherrie"	Jo Jo Zep	Joe Camilleri; Paul Kelly	Cha	1982	
"Shortcut"	Paul Kelly with Shane O'Mara, Steve Hadley, Bruce Haymes & Peter Luscombe	Paul Kelly; Shane O'Mara; Steve Hadley; Bruce Haymes; Peter Luscombe	Lantana (Music for the Feature Film)	2001	
"Shy Before You Lord"	Paul Kelly with Uncle Bill	Paul Kelly; Jex Saarelaht	Smoke	1999	(Note: Also titled as "So Shy".)
"Side by Side" ‡	Paul Kelly	Paul Kelly	Runt (Motion Picture Soundtrack)	2024	
"Silent Night"	Paul Kelly and the Boon Companions	Joseph Mohr; Franz Xaver Gruber; Paul Kelly; Alice Keath; Sime Nugent	The Spirit of Christmas '06	2006	
"Silent Night"	Paul Kelly, Alice Keath & Sime Nugent	Joseph Mohr; Franz Xaver Gruber; Paul Kelly; Alice Keath; Sime Nugent	Paul Kelly's Christmas Train	2021	
"Silent Partner"	Paul Kelly & Gerry Hale	Paul Kelly; Gerry Hale	Silent Partner (Original Motion Picture Soundtrack)	2001	
"Silver's on the Line"	Paul Kelly & Gerry Hale	Paul Kelly; Gerry Hale	Silent Partner (Original Motion Picture Soundtrack)	2001	
"Silver's Theme"	Paul Kelly & Gerry Hale	Paul Kelly; Gerry Hale	Silent Partner (Original Motion Picture Soundtrack)	2001	
"Simple Ben"	Machine Translations with Paul Kelly, Dan Kelly, Bree van Reyk and Zoe Hauptmann	John J. Francis †	Morning of the Earth Reimagined	2014	
"Sing You Over"	Emma Donovan featuring Paul Kelly	Emma Donovan; Mick Meagher †	Til My Song Is Done	2024	
"Sinner" # (Neil Finn cover)	Neil Finn & Paul Kelly	Neil Finn; Marius de Vries †	Goin' Your Way	2013	
"Skidding Hearts"	Paul Kelly and the Dots	Paul Kelly	Manila	1982	
"Slave for Love"	Jo Jo Zep	Joe Camilleri; Paul Kelly	Cha	1982	
"Sleep Baby"	Whistle & Trick featuring Paul Kelly	Colin Leadbetter; Maddy Kelly; Paul Kelly	Bananas and Other Delicious Things	2023	
"Sleep, Australia, Sleep" ‡	Paul Kelly	Paul Kelly	Non-album single	2020	
"Smells Like Rain"	Paul Kelly featuring Linda Bull	Paul Kelly; Dan Sultan; Kev Carmody	The Merri Soul Sessions	2014	
"Smoke Under the Bridge"	Paul Kelly	Paul Kelly	...Nothing but a Dream	2001	
"So Blue"	Paul Kelly and the Coloured Girls	Paul Kelly	Gossip	1986	
"So Fine"	Statler & Waldorf vs. Paul Kelly	Dennis Gascoigne; Cameron Hales †	Collusions	2004	
"So Soft"	Paul Kelly & Dan Luscombe featuring Soteria Bell	Paul Kelly; Dan Luscombe	Jindabyne (Original Motion Picture Soundtrack)	2006	
"Some Guys"	Paul Kelly and the Dots	Paul Kelly	Manila	1982	
"Somebody's Forgetting Somebody (Somebody's Letting Somebody Down)"	Paul Kelly and the Coloured Girls	Paul Kelly	Gossip	1986	
"Someday"	Deborah Conway	Deborah Conway; Dorland Bray; Paul Kelly	String of Pearls	1991	
"Someone New"	Paul Kelly	Paul Kelly	Spring and Fall	2012	
"Sometimes My Baby"	Paul Kelly	Paul Kelly	Spring and Fall	2012	
"Somewhere in the City" ‡	Paul Kelly	Paul Kelly	...Nothing but a Dream	2001	
"Song from the Sixteenth Floor" ‡	Paul Kelly	Paul Kelly; John Clifforth	Wanted Man	1994	
"Song of the Old Rake"	Paul Kelly and the Stormwater Boys	Paul Kelly	Foggy Highway	2005	
"Sonnet 18" (William Shakespeare poem)	Paul Kelly	William Shakespeare; Paul Kelly	Seven Sonnets & a Song	2016	
"Sonnet 60" (William Shakespeare poem)	Paul Kelly	William Shakespeare; Paul Kelly	Seven Sonnets & a Song	2016	
"Sonnet 73" (William Shakespeare poem)	Paul Kelly	William Shakespeare; Paul Kelly	Seven Sonnets & a Song	2016	
"Sonnet 138" (William Shakespeare poem)	Paul Kelly	William Shakespeare; Paul Kelly	Seven Sonnets & a Song	2016	
"Sonnet 138" (William Shakespeare poem)	Paul Kelly & Paul Grabowsky	William Shakespeare; Paul Kelly	Please Leave Your Light On	2020	
"Sonnet 147" (William Shakespeare poem)	Paul Kelly	William Shakespeare; Paul Kelly	Poetry	2023	
"Sonnets 44 & 45" (William Shakespeare poems)	Paul Kelly	William Shakespeare; Paul Kelly	Seven Sonnets & a Song	2016	
"South of Germany"	Paul Kelly and the Messengers	Paul Kelly	So Much Water So Close to Home	1989	
"Special Treatment"	Paul Kelly and the Messengers	Paul Kelly	Hidden Things (B-side to "Careless")	1989	
"Spirits of My Land"	Kerri Simpson	Kerri Simpson; Cindy Bennett; Rodney Carter; Paul Kelly	Vodou Songs of the Spirits	2001	
"Standing on the Street of Early Sorrows"	Paul Kelly	Paul Kelly	Post	1985	
scope="row" "Stardust" (Hoagy Carmichael cover)	Paul Kelly	Hoagy Carmichael; Mitchell Parish	Seventy (Deluxe edition)	2026	
"State of War"	High Rise Bombers	Unknown	History Pt. 1	1979	
"Stephen Foster's Last Waltz"	Paul Kelly & Charlie Owen	Paul Kelly	Non-album single	2014	(Note: The song was included on an album for the first time with the release of Kelly's 2023 compilation People.)
"Stewart and Claire"	Paul Kelly & Dan Luscombe featuring Soteria Bell	Paul Kelly; Dan Luscombe	Jindabyne (Original Motion Picture Soundtrack)	2006	
"Still Here"	Melinda Schneider with Paul Kelly	Melinda Schneider; Jay Knowles †	Be Yourself	2008	
"Stolen Apples Taste the Sweetest"	Paul Kelly	Paul Kelly	Stolen Apples	2007	
"Stories of Me"	Paul Kelly and the Coloured Girls	Paul Kelly	Gossip	1986	(Note: A re-recorded version by Paul Kelly and the Messengers was included on their 1991 album Comedy.)
"Stories of Me"	Paul Kelly with Uncle Bill	Paul Kelly	Smoke	1999	
"Stranger in My Country" (Vic Simms cover)	The Painted Ladies	Vic Simms †	Play Selections from the Loner	2014	(Note: Kelly is credited with vocals on the track.)
"Streets of Forbes"	Mick Thomas and the Sure Thing with Paul Kelly	Traditional; Craig Pilkington; Mick Thomas †	Spin! Spin! Spin!	2009	
"Stumbling Block"	Paul Kelly and the Stormwater Boys	Paul Kelly	Foggy Highway	2005	
"Stumbling Block"	Paul Kelly	Paul Kelly	Forty Days	2020	
"Suit Your Style"	Hunters & Collectors	Mark Seymour; Barry Palmer; Doug Falconer; Michael Waters; Jack Howard; John Archer; Robert Miles; Jeremy Smith; Paul Kelly	Juggernaut	1998	
"Summer Leaves"	The Blackeyed Susans Trio	Paul Kelly	Hard Liquor... Soft Music	1994	(Note: Also known as "When Summer Leaves Turn to Brown".)
"Summer Rain"	Paul Kelly	Paul Kelly	Wanted Man	1994	
"Summer Wine" (Nancy Sinatra & Lee Hazlewood cover)	The Cambodian Space Project with Paul Kelly	Paul Kelly	Spaced Out in Wonderland	2017	
"Summer, Winter, Spring and Fall"	Renée Geyer	Renée Geyer; Paul Kelly; John Clifforth	Difficult Woman	1994	
"Surah Maryam"	Waleed Aly & Paul Kelly	Traditional (Quran); Paul Kelly	Paul Kelly's Christmas Train	2021	
"Sure Got Me"	Paul Kelly	Paul Kelly; Dan Kelly; Dan Luscombe; Peter Luscombe; Bill McDonald	Ways & Means	2004	(Note: Also known as "Sure Got Me Where You Want Me".)
"Surely God Is a Lover" (John Shaw Neilson poem)	Jimmy Little	John Shaw Neilson; Paul Kelly	Resonate	2001	
"Surely God Is a Lover" (John Shaw Neilson poem)	Paul Kelly and the Stormwater Boys	John Shaw Neilson; Paul Kelly	Foggy Highway	2005	
"Sweet Guy" ‡	Paul Kelly and the Messengers	Paul Kelly	So Much Water So Close to Home	1989	(Note: A demo recording from 1987 titled "Why Does Such a Sweet Guy Turn So Mean" is contained in the National Film and Sound Archive.) (Note: Paul Kelly and the Messengers also recorded a waltz version, titled "Sweet Guy Waltz", for inclusion on the band's 1992 compilation Hidden Things.)
"Sweet Guy" ‡	Paul Kelly featuring Vika Bull	Paul Kelly	The Merri Soul Sessions	2014	
"Sweetest Thing"	Paul Kelly	Paul Kelly; Dan Kelly; Dan Luscombe; Peter Luscombe; Bill McDonald	Stolen Apples	2007	
"Swing Around the Sun" (Casey Bennetto cover)	Paul Kelly	Casey Bennetto †	Paul Kelly's Christmas Train	2021	
"Sydney from a 727"	Paul Kelly and the Messengers	Paul Kelly	Comedy	1991	
"Sydney from a 727"	Paul Kelly with Uncle Bill	Paul Kelly	Smoke	1999	(Note: Beginning with this rendition alongside Uncle Bill, all subsequent recordings and live renditions were titled "Sydney from a 747". This was due to the phasing out of the Boeing 727 aircraft in Australia in late 1997 and Kelly's willingness to update the lyric to reflect the prominence of the Boeing 747 aircraft instead.)
"Take It Handy"	Paul Kelly	Paul Kelly	Seventy	2025	
"Take Your Time"	Paul Kelly and the Messengers	Paul Kelly	Comedy	1991	(Note: A version was recorded by Kelly for 2004's Fireflies; it was not included on the CD soundtrack release.)
"Tapu te Pō (O Holy Night)" (Maisey Rika cover)	Marlon Williams, The Dhungala Children's Choir & Paul Kelly	Adolphe Adam; Placide Cappeau; Marlon Williams; Paul Kelly; Jess Hitchcock	Paul Kelly's Christmas Train	2021	
"Taught by Experts"	Paul Kelly	Paul Kelly	Live, May 1992	1992	(Note: A solo studio version recorded by Kelly for a 2003 pre-master CD is contained in the National Film and Sound Archive. A new rendition was later recorded by Kelly and his band and released on his 2024 album Fever Longing Still.)
"Taught by Experts"	Paul Kelly with Uncle Bill	Paul Kelly	Smoke	1999	
"Taught by Experts"	Paul Kelly and the Boon Companions	Paul Kelly	Fireflies: The Songs of Paul Kelly (From the ABC TV Series)	2004	
"Teach Me Tonight"	Paul Kelly with Uncle Bill	Paul Kelly; Gerry Hale	Smoke	1999	
"Teach Me Tonight"	Paul Kelly & Gerry Hale	Paul Kelly; Gerry Hale	Silent Partner (Original Motion Picture Soundtrack)	2001	
"Tease Me" ‡	Paul Kelly	Paul Kelly; Bruce Haymes	Songs from the South: Paul Kelly's Greatest Hits (Bonus disc edition)	1997	
"Tell Me When You're Close"	Mark Campbell and the Ravens	Mark Campbell; Paul Kelly	Mark Campbell and the Ravens	2025	(Note: A solo demo version was first recorded and uploaded by Campbell in 2015 as part of the Million Dollar Riff project.)
"Tell Us a Story" ‡	Paul Kelly	Paul Kelly	Seventy	2025	(Note: Separated into two tracks suffixed "(Part A)" and "(Part B)" on the album release, the song was released as a single, titled "Tell Us a Story (Full Length)", in the months following. The full-length version was then included as the opening track on the deluxe edition of Seventy.)
"Tennessee Rain"	Troy Cassar-Daley	Troy Cassar-Daley; Paul Kelly	Freedom Ride	2015	
"Thank You"	Paul Kelly	Paul Kelly	The Merri Soul Sessions	2014	(Note: First referenced in the Spring and Fall chapter of Kelly's 2012 book Don't Start Me Talking: Lyrics 1984–2012.)
"Thanks a Lot" (Ernest Tubb cover)	Paul Kelly with Uncle Bill	Eddie Miller; Don Sessions †	Where Joy Kills Sorrow	1997	
"That's the Thing About Football" ‡	Greg Champion	Greg Champion; Mike Brady; Paul Kelly	That's What I Like About Football	1994	
"The Ballad of Good & Evil"	Glory Boys	Chris Langman; John Dowler; Paul Kelly	(When the Sun Sets Over) Carlton	2014	(Note: Recorded in 1980, the song was unreleased until its inclusion on the 2014 compilation (When the Sun Sets Over) Carlton: Melbourne's Countercultural Inner City Rock Scene of the '70s.)
"The Ballad of Queenie and Rover"	Paul Kelly	Paul Kelly	Stolen Apples	2007	
"The Ballroom"	Paul Kelly and the Coloured Girls	Paul Kelly	Gossip	1986	
"The Boat"	Paul Kelly & The Cambodian Space Project	Kak Channthy; Julien Poulson; Walt Whitman †	The Key of Sea: Volume 2	2012	
"The Body Keeps the Score"	Paul Kelly	Paul Kelly; Billy Miller	Seventy	2025	
"The Cake and the Candle"	Kate Ceberano with Paul Kelly	Paul Kelly	Kate Ceberano & Friends	1994	
"The Cake and the Candle"	Renée Geyer	Paul Kelly	Sweet Life	1999	(Note: Titled as simply "Cake and the Candle" on this release, among others.)
"The Cake and the Candle"	Paul Kelly	Paul Kelly	The A to Z Recordings	2010	
"The Cherry Tree Carol"	Paul Kelly	Traditional; Paul Kelly	Paul Kelly's Christmas Train (2023 edition)	2023	
"The Chimes at Midnight"	Paul Kelly, James Ledger, Genevieve Lacey & ANAM Musicians	Paul Kelly; James Ledger	Conversations with Ghosts	2013	(Note: First referenced in the Spring and Fall chapter of Kelly's 2012 book Don't Start Me Talking: Lyrics 1984–2012.)
"The Darkling Thrush" (Thomas Hardy poem)	Paul Kelly, James Ledger, Alice Keath & Seraphim Trio	Thomas Hardy; Paul Kelly; James Ledger	Thirteen Ways to Look at Birds	2019	
"The Darkling Thrush" (Thomas Hardy poem)	Paul Kelly	Thomas Hardy; Paul Kelly; James Ledger	Love Is Strong as Death	2019	
"The Execution" ‡	Paul Kelly and the Coloured Girls	Paul Kelly	Gossip	1986	
"The Fly" (Miroslav Holub poem)	Paul Kelly, James Ledger, Alice Keath & Seraphim Trio	Miroslav Holub; Paul Kelly; James Ledger	Thirteen Ways to Look at Birds	2019	
"The Foggy Fields of France"	Paul Kelly	Paul Kelly	Stolen Apples	2007	
"The Friendly Beasts"	Paul Kelly, Kasey Chambers & Dan Kelly	Traditional; Robert Davis; Paul Kelly; Dan Kelly; Cameron Bruce; Bill McDonald; Ashley Naylor; Peter Luscombe	Paul Kelly's Christmas Train	2021	
"The Gatekeeper"	Paul Kelly & Gerry Hale	Paul Kelly; Gerry Hale	Silent Partner (Original Motion Picture Soundtrack)	2001	
"The Gift That Keeps on Giving"	Bic Runga	Paul Kelly	The Women at the Well: The Songs of Paul Kelly	2002	
"The Gift That Keeps on Giving"	Paul Kelly	Paul Kelly	...Nothing but a Dream (...The Gift That Keeps on Giving bonus disc edition)	2002	(Note: Subtitled "The Song of Sharon" in Kelly's 2012 lyrics book Don't Start Me Talking.)
"The Governor's Wife"	Paul Kelly & Shane O'Mara	Paul Kelly	Everynight... Everynight	1996	
"The Honey Bee"	Vika & Linda	Vika Bull; Linda Bull; Michael Barker; Tim Finn; Paul Kelly	Princess Tabu	1996	
"The Lake Isle of Innisfree" (W. B. Yeats poem)	Paul Kelly, James Ledger, Genevieve Lacey & ANAM Musicians	W. B. Yeats; Paul Kelly; James Ledger	Conversations with Ghosts	2013	
"The Last Resort"	Paul Kelly and the Dots	Paul Kelly; Alan Brooker; Michael Holmes; Tim Brosnan; Tony Thornton	Manila	1982	
"The Lion and the Lamb"	Paul Kelly	Paul Kelly; Dan Kelly; Dan Luscombe; Peter Luscombe; Bill McDonald	Stolen Apples	2007	
"The Long View"	Vika & Linda	Paul Kelly	The Wait	2021	(Note: First referenced in the Spring and Fall chapter of Kelly's 2012 book Don't Start Me Talking: Lyrics 1984–2012.)
"The Long Walk"	Vika & Linda	Vika Bull; Linda Bull; Paul Kelly; Ashley Cadell	Non-album single (B-side to "Love Comes Easy")	1996	
"The Magpies" (Denis Glover poem)	Paul Kelly, James Ledger, Alice Keath & Seraphim Trio	Denis Glover; Paul Kelly; James Ledger	Thirteen Ways to Look at Birds	2019	
"The Magpies" (Denis Glover poem)	Paul Kelly	Denis Glover; Paul Kelly; James Ledger	Love Is Strong as Death	2019	
"The Oldest Story in the Book"	Paul Kelly	Paul Kelly; Dan Luscombe	Ways & Means	2004	
"The Oxen" (Thomas Hardy poem)	Paul Kelly	Thomas Hardy; Paul Kelly	Paul Kelly's Christmas Train	2021	
"The Parting Glass"	Paul Kelly & Charlie Owen	Traditional; Paul Kelly; Charlie Owen	Death's Dateless Night	2016	(Note: Also known simply as "Parting Glass".)
"The Parting Song" ‡	Vika & Linda	Vika Bull; Linda Bull; Paul Kelly	Princess Tabu	1996	
"The Path to Your Door"	Gyan & Leunig featuring Paul Kelly	Gyan Evans; Michael Leunig; James Cruickshank †	Billy the Rabbit	2006	
"The Pretty Place"	Paul Kelly	Paul Kelly	...Nothing but a Dream	2001	
"The River Song"	Paul Kelly	Paul Kelly	Nature	2018	(Note: Also known simply as "River Song".)
"The Sunlander" (Slim Dusty cover)	Paul Kelly & Uncle Bill	Slim Dusty †	Not So Dusty: A Tribute to Slim Dusty	1998	
"The Trap"	Paul Kelly & Shane O'Mara	Paul Kelly	Everynight... Everynight	1996	
"The Trees" (Philip Larkin poem)	Paul Kelly	Philip Larkin; Paul Kelly	Nature	2018	
"The Virgin Mary Had One Son" (The Staple Singers cover)	Emma Donovan & Paul Kelly	Traditional; Pops Staples †	Paul Kelly's Christmas Train	2021	
"The Way Love Used to Be"	Paul Kelly and the Dots	Paul Kelly	Talk	1981	
"The Way That I Love You"	Ursula Yovich	Paul Kelly	Jindabyne (Original Motion Picture Soundtrack)	2006	
"The Windhover" (Gerard Manley Hopkins poem)	Paul Kelly, James Ledger, Alice Keath & Seraphim Trio	Gerard Manley Hopkins; Paul Kelly; James Ledger	Thirteen Ways to Look at Birds	2019	
"There's Nothing Wrong with Being Wrong Sometimes"	Kate Ceberano	Paul Kelly; Kate Ceberano	The Women at the Well: The Songs of Paul Kelly	2002	
"These Are the Days"	Paul Kelly	Paul Kelly	Ways & Means	2004	
"These Old Lies"	Debra Byrne	Debra Byrne; Paul Kelly	Sleeping Child	1994	
"They Thought I Was Asleep"	Paul Kelly and the Stormwater Boys	Paul Kelly	Foggy Highway	2005	
"Things We Said in the Dark"	Stardust Five	Dan Kelly; Paul Kelly; Dan Luscombe; Peter Luscombe; Bill McDonald	Stardust Five	2006	
"This Land Is Mine"	Paul Kelly & Kelton Pell	Paul Kelly; Kev Carmody	One Night the Moon	2001	
"This Mess We're In" # (PJ Harvey cover)	Paul Kelly & Katy Steele	PJ Harvey †	RocKwiz Duets	2006	
"This Summer"	High Rise Bombers	Martin Armiger †	History Pt. 1	1979	
"Thornbills" (Judith Wright poem)	Paul Kelly, James Ledger, Alice Keath & Seraphim Trio	Judith Wright; Paul Kelly; James Ledger	Thirteen Ways to Look at Birds	2019	
"Thoughts in the Middle of the Night"	Paul Kelly	Paul Kelly	Songs from the South Vol. 2: 98–07	2008	(Note: Also known as "Very Late".)
"Three Drovers"	Paul Kelly, Alice Keath & Sime Nugent	John Wheeler; William G. James; Paul Kelly; Alice Keath; Sime Nugent	Paul Kelly's Christmas Train	2021	
"Through the Window"	Paul Kelly with Shane O'Mara, Steve Hadley, Bruce Haymes & Peter Luscombe	Paul Kelly; Shane O'Mara; Steve Hadley; Bruce Haymes; Peter Luscombe	Lantana (Music for the Feature Film)	2001	
"Throwing Good Love After Bad"	Paul Kelly	Paul Kelly	...Nothing but a Dream (...The Gift That Keeps on Giving bonus disc edition)	2002	
"Tighten Up"	Paul Kelly and the Coloured Girls	Paul Kelly	Gossip	1986	
"Time and Tide"	Paul Kelly	Paul Kelly; Alan Pigram	Spring and Fall	2012	
"Time and Tide"	Paul Kelly & Paul Grabowsky	Paul Kelly; Alan Pigram	Please Leave Your Light On	2020	(Note: Also known as "Time and Tide Wait for No-One".)
"Time Is a Friend of Mine"	Troy Cassar-Daley	Troy Cassar-Daley; Paul Kelly	Brighter Day	2005	
"To Be Good Takes a Long Time"	Vika & Linda	Paul Kelly	Love Is Mighty Close	2002	(Note: The version first released by Vika & Linda is titled "To Be Good Takes a Long Time (To Be Bad No Time at All)".)
"To Be Good Takes a Long Time"	Paul Kelly	Paul Kelly	Ways & Means	2004	(Note: A version recorded by Paul Kelly and the Stormwater Boys in 2005 as part of a set of unreleased mixes for Foggy Highway is included in the National Film and Sound Archive.)
"To Bring You My Love" (PJ Harvey cover)	Paul Kelly	PJ Harvey †	No Man's Woman	2007	
"To Her Door" ‡	Paul Kelly and the Coloured Girls	Paul Kelly	Under the Sun	1987	
"To Live Is to Fly" (Townes Van Zandt cover)	Paul Kelly & Charlie Owen	Townes Van Zandt †	Death's Dateless Night	2016	
"Too Many Movies"	Mary-Jo Starr	Paul Kelly	Too Many Movies	1990	
"Too Much Lovin'"	Mary-Jo Starr	Paul Kelly	Too Many Movies	1990	(Note: Also known as "I Had Too Much Loving Last Night".)
"Touchy Babe"	Paul Kelly and the Dots	Paul Kelly	Manila	1982	
"Town by the Bay" # (Kuckles cover)	Leah Flanagan & Paul Kelly	Jimmy Chi †	Exile: Songs and Tales of Irish Australia	2018	
"Train of My Youth"	Paul Kelly & Shane O'Mara	Paul Kelly	Everynight... Everynight	1996	
"Treaty" ‡	Yothu Yindi	Mandawuy Yunupingu; Paul Kelly; Peter Garrett; Geoffrey Gurrumul Yunupingu; Milkayngu Mununggurr; Stuart Kellaway; Cal Williams	Tribal Voice	1991	(Note: An updated version, titled "Treaty 98", was included on Yothu Yindi's 1998 album One Blood.)
"Troitsa Bratya"	Paul Kelly & Dan Luscombe featuring Soteria Bell	Paul Kelly; Dan Luscombe	Jindabyne (Original Motion Picture Soundtrack)	2006	
"True Tears of Joy" (Hunters & Collectors cover)	Paul Kelly & Emma Donovan featuring Jimblah	Mark Seymour; Barry Palmer; Doug Falconer; Michael Waters; Jack Howard; John Archer; Robert Miles; Jeremy Smith †	Crucible: The Songs of Hunters & Collectors	2013	
"True to You"	Paul Kelly & Paul Grabowsky	Paul Kelly	Please Leave Your Light On	2020	
"Ugly Woman"	Paul Kelly, Renée Geyer & Deborah Conway	Raphael de Leon †	Seven Deadly Sins (Music from the ABC TV Series)	1992	
"Under the Sun"	Paul Kelly and the Coloured Girls	Paul Kelly	Under the Sun	1987	
"Until Death Do Them Part"	Paul Kelly	Paul Kelly	Live, May 1992	1992	(Note: Written and performed for the 1992 play Funerals and Circuses, the song was included in Kelly's 1993 book Lyrics under the chapter of that name. A bootleg recording of the theatre performance exists online.)
"Until Death Do Them Part"	Paul Kelly with Uncle Bill	Paul Kelly	Smoke	1999	
"Untitled"	Paul Kelly	Paul Kelly; Mart Saarelaht	Deeper Water	1995	(Note: This recording is a hidden, untitled ambient instrumental track that runs for 5 minutes and 20 seconds at the conclusion of Kelly's 1995 album Deeper Water.)
"Untouchable"	Paul Kelly and the Coloured Girls	Paul Kelly	Under the Sun	1987	
"Untouchable" #	Kate Ceberano	Kate Ceberano; Paul Kelly; Mark Goldenberg; Philip Ceberano	Live with the West Australian Symphony Orchestra	2006	(Note: Not to be confused with the Kelly original of the same name recorded for 1987's Under the Sun, this song was first known as "This Wasn't Supposed to Happen to Me" until its eventual release in 2006 by Kate Ceberano.)
"VFL Task Force"	The Coodabeen Champions	Greg Champion; Paul Kelly; Chris Langman	In the Superbox	1987	(Note: This song was a parody of "Leaps and Bounds", thus giving Kelly a writing credit.)
"Walk the Landings"	Sara Storer	Sara Storer; Paul Kelly	Firefly	2005	
"Want You Back"	Paul Kelly and the Dots	Paul Kelly	Talk	1981	
"Watching the River Go By"	Cameron Daddo	Cameron Daddo; Paul Kelly	A Long Goodbye	1993	
"We Won't Cry"	Archie Roach featuring Paul Kelly	Archie Roach; Paul Kelly	Into the Bloodstream	2012	
"We'll Get Over It Somehow"	Paul Kelly	Paul Kelly	Non-album single (B-side to "Love Never Runs on Time")	1994	
"We've Started a Fire"	Vika & Linda	Paul Kelly	Vika and Linda	1994	(Note: Also known as "Lucky Break Theme".)
"We've Started a Fire"	Paul Kelly	Paul Kelly	Wanted Man	1994	
"What Are You Doing New Year's Eve?" (Margaret Whiting cover)	Alma Zygier & Paul Kelly	Frank Loesser †	Paul Kelly's Christmas Train	2021	
"What Do You Know"	Kaarin Fairfax & Kelton Pell	Kev Carmody; Deirdre Hannan; Mairead Hannan; Paul Kelly	One Night the Moon	2001	
"What You Want"	Paul Kelly featuring Vika Bull	Paul Kelly; Dan Sultan	The Merri Soul Sessions	2014	
"What's Happening to Us"	Paul Kelly with Shane O'Mara, Steve Hadley, Bruce Haymes & Peter Luscombe	Paul Kelly; Shane O'Mara; Steve Hadley; Bruce Haymes; Peter Luscombe	Lantana (Music for the Feature Film)	2001	
"When a Woman Loves a Man"	Renée Geyer	Paul Kelly	Dedicated	2007	
"When a Woman Loves a Man"	Paul Kelly	Paul Kelly	Spring and Fall	2012	
"When a Woman Loves a Man"	Paul Kelly & Paul Grabowsky	Paul Kelly	Please Leave Your Light On	2020	
"When I First Met Your Ma" ‡	Paul Kelly and the Messengers	Paul Kelly	Hidden Things	1992	
"When I First Met Your Ma" ‡	Paul Kelly and the Stormwater Boys	Paul Kelly	Foggy Highway	2005	
"When I Lay Down with You" (Maurice Frawley & Working Class Ringos cover)	Paul Kelly & The Large Number 12s featuring Jimmy Williams	Maurice Frawley †	Long Gone Whistle: The Songs of Maurice Frawley	2010	
"When the Girl's Not Even English"	Paul Kelly and the Dots	Paul Kelly; Chris Langman	Manila	1982	
"When We're Both Old & Mad"	Paul Kelly & Kasey Chambers	Paul Kelly	Songs from the South (1985–2019): Paul Kelly's Greatest Hits	2019	
"Where Were You When I Needed You"	Paul Kelly featuring Clairy Browne	Paul Kelly	The Merri Soul Sessions	2014	(Note: First referenced in the Ways & Means chapter of Kelly's 2012 book Don't Start Me Talking: Lyrics 1984–2012.)
"Whistling Bird"	Paul Kelly with Uncle Bill	Paul Kelly	Smoke	1999	
"Whistling Cannonballs"	Shane Nicholson with Paul Kelly	Shane Nicholson †	Bad Machines	2011	
"White Train"	Paul Kelly	Paul Kelly	Post	1985	
"White Train"	Paul Kelly and the Coloured Girls	Paul Kelly	Gossip	1986	
"White Trash" ‡	Professor Ratbaggy	Steve Hadley; Bruce Haymes; Paul Kelly; Peter Luscombe	Professor Ratbaggy	1999	
"White Wine in the Sun" (Tim Minchin cover)	Paul Kelly	Tim Minchin †	Paul Kelly's Christmas Train (2023 edition)	2023	
"Why Baby Why" (George Jones cover)	Troy Cassar-Daley featuring Paul Kelly	Darrell Edwards; George Jones †	Borrowed & Blue	2004	
"Wide Open Road" # (The Triffids cover)	Paul Kelly & Chris Bailey	David McComb †	Mushroom 25 Live (VHS edition)	1998	
"Winter Coat" ‡	Paul Kelly and the Messengers	Paul Kelly	Comedy	1991	(Note: Also listed as "Wintercoat" on some releases.)
"Winter Coat" ‡	Paul Kelly & Paul Grabowsky	Paul Kelly	Please Leave Your Light On	2020	
"Wish I Was a Train"	Troy Cassar-Daley with Paul Kelly	Troy Cassar-Daley; Paul Kelly	Long Way Home	2002	
"With Animals" (Walt Whitman poem)	Paul Kelly	Walt Whitman; Paul Kelly	Nature	2018	(Note: Also known as "I Think I Could Turn and Live with Animals...".)
"With the One I Love" ‡	Paul Kelly	Paul Kelly	Nature	2018	
"Woman to Man" (Judith Wright poem)	Paul Kelly, James Ledger, Genevieve Lacey & ANAM Musicians	Judith Wright; Paul Kelly; James Ledger	Conversations with Ghosts	2013	
"Won't Give In" # (The Finn Brothers cover)	Neil Finn & Paul Kelly	Neil Finn; Tim Finn †	Goin' Your Way	2013	
"Won't You Come Around?"	Paul Kelly	Paul Kelly	Won't You Come Around	2003	
"Words and Music"	Paul Kelly	Paul Kelly	Words and Music	1998	
"Words of Love" # (Buddy Holly cover)	Neil Finn & Paul Kelly	Buddy Holly †	Goin' Your Way	2013	
"Would You Be My Friend?"	Paul Kelly	Paul Kelly	...Nothing but a Dream	2001	
"Would You Be My Friend?"	Paul Kelly & Gerry Hale	Paul Kelly	Silent Partner (Original Motion Picture Soundtrack)	2001	
"Yil Lull" ‡ (Joe Geia cover)	Paul Kelly and the Messengers	Joe Geia †	Hidden Things	1992	
"Yil Lull" ‡ (Joe Geia cover)	Singers for the Red Black & Gold	Joe Geia †	Non-album single	1998	(Note: The one-time supergroup "Singers for the Red Black & Gold" consisted of vocalists Archie Roach, Kelly, Christine Anu, Judith Durham, Renée Geyer, Kutcha Edwards and the band Tiddas.)
"You and Sarajevo" (Bruce Dawe poem)	Paul Kelly	Bruce Dawe; Paul Kelly	Forty Days	2020	
"You Bring These Things"	Karen Marks	Paul Kelly; Chris Langman	Terra Australis	1981	
"You Broke a Beautiful Thing"	Renée Geyer	Paul Kelly	Sweet Life	1999	
"You Broke a Beautiful Thing"	Paul Kelly	Paul Kelly	...Nothing but a Dream (...The Gift That Keeps on Giving bonus disc edition)	2002	(Note: A re-recorded version was included on Kelly's 2004 album Ways & Means.)
"You Broke a Beautiful Thing"	Paul Kelly & Paul Grabowsky	Paul Kelly	Non-album single	2020	
"You Can Put Your Shoes Under My Bed"	Paul Kelly	Paul Kelly	Post	1985	
"You Can Put Your Shoes Under My Bed"	Paul Kelly and the Messengers	Paul Kelly	Comedy	1991	
"You Can Put Your Shoes Under My Bed"	Paul Kelly & Paul Grabowsky	Paul Kelly	Please Leave Your Light On	2020	
"You Can't Take It With You"	Paul Kelly and the Messengers	Paul Kelly	So Much Water So Close to Home	1989	(Note: An instrumental version performed by Kelly and Gerry Hale is contained on 2001's Silent Partner soundtrack.)
"You Can't Take It With You"	Paul Kelly with Uncle Bill	Paul Kelly	Smoke	1999	
"You Can't Take It With You"	Paul Kelly and the Stormwater Boys	Paul Kelly	Foggy Highway	2005	
"You Touch Me Down to My Soul"	Vika & Linda	Paul Kelly	Love Is Mighty Close	2002	
"You're 39, You're Beautiful and You're Mine"	Tex, Don & Charlie	Paul Kelly	All Is Forgiven	2005	
"You're 39, You're Beautiful and You're Mine"	Paul Kelly	Paul Kelly	Stolen Apples	2007	
"You're Draggin' Me"	The Blackeyed Susans	Phil Kakulas; Paul Kelly	Reveal Yourself	2009	
"You're Gonna Lose Her"	Kate Ceberano	Kate Ceberano; Paul Kelly	Anthology	2016	
"You're Learning" (The Louvin Brothers cover)	Paul Kelly and the Stormwater Boys	Charlie Louvin; Ira Louvin †	Foggy Highway	2005	
"You're So Fine"	Paul Kelly	Paul Kelly; Peter Luscombe	Roll On Summer	2000	
"You're Still Picking the Same Sore"	Paul Kelly	Paul Kelly	Wanted Man	1994	
"Young Lovers"	Paul Kelly	Paul Kelly; Dan Kelly; Dan Luscombe	Ways & Means	2004	
"Young Lovers"	Paul Kelly & Paul Grabowsky	Paul Kelly; Dan Kelly; Dan Luscombe	Please Leave Your Light On	2020	
"Your Little Sister (Is a Big Girl Now)"	Paul Kelly and the Messengers	Paul Kelly	Comedy	1991	
"Your Lovin' Is On My Mind"	Paul Kelly	Paul Kelly	Ways & Means	2004	
"Zoe"	Stardust Five	Dan Kelly; Paul Kelly; Dan Luscombe; Peter Luscombe; Bill McDonald	Stardust Five	2006	

== Unreleased songs ==
Key
†	Song not written or co-written by Paul Kelly

Name of song, writer(s), original release, and year of release
Song	Artist(s)	Writer(s)	Year	Notes	Ref.
"3 Fiddles"	Paul Kelly & Uncle Bill	Paul Kelly; Bill Monroe	Unknown	Registered by APRA AMCOS	
"A Demonstration" (Jessica Traynor poem)	Paul Kelly & Camille O'Sullivan with Feargal Murray	Jessica Traynor; Paul Kelly	2016	Registered by APRA AMCOS; Performed live during the Ancient Rain stage production	
"A Man's Gotta Know"	Paul Kelly	Eddie Perfect; Paul Kelly	2016	Registered by APRA AMCOS; Performed during an episode of Comedy Showroom titled "The Future Is Expensive"	
"Act of Union" (Seamus Heaney poem)	Paul Kelly & Camille O'Sullivan with Feargal Murray	Seamus Heaney; Paul Kelly	2016	Registered by APRA AMCOS; Performed live during the Ancient Rain stage production	
"Alex Silver"	Paul Kelly & Gerry Hale	Paul Kelly	c. 2001	Registered by APRA AMCOS; Presumably written for Silent Partner	
"All My Loving"	Paul Kelly	Steve Hadley; Bruce Haymes; Paul Kelly; Peter Luscombe	c. 1999	Registered by APRA AMCOS; Presumably for Professor Ratbaggy and written during the Professor Ratbaggy sessions	
"Already Gone"	Paul Kelly and the Coloured Girls	Paul Kelly	1986	Contained in the National Film and Sound Archive (NFSA); Included in Kelly's 1993 book Lyrics under the Under the Sun chapter; Recorded during the Under the Sun sessions	
"Annie Good Night"	Paul Kelly and the Dots	Unknown	1980	Contained in the National Film and Sound Archive (NFSA); Recorded during the Talk sessions	
"As the Crow Flies"	Sherry Rich & Courtesy Move	Sherry Rich; Paul Kelly	c. 1997	Registered by APRA AMCOS; Presumably written during the Sherry Rich & Courtesy Move sessions	
"Australian Rules"	None listed	Paul Kelly	Unknown	Registered by APRA AMCOS; Listed as a theme by APRA AMCOS and a jingle by ASCAP	
"Bars"	Paul Kelly	Paul Kelly; Dan Luscombe; Peter Luscombe; Bill McDonald	c. 2005	Registered by APRA AMCOS; Included in Kelly's 2012 book Don't Start Me Talking: Lyrics 1984–2012 under the Stardust Five chapter	
"Better Look Twice"	None listed	Paul Kelly	Unknown	Registered by APRA AMCOS	
"Bliss"	None listed	Damian Robinson; Linda Janssen; Paul Kelly	Unknown	Registered by APRA AMCOS; Presumably intended for Wicked Beat Sound System	
"Can't Stop Seeing You"	Paul Kelly and the Dots	Paul Kelly	1980	Contained in the National Film and Sound Archive (NFSA); Recorded during the Talk sessions	
"Cessnock (1–2)"	Paul Kelly & Gerry Hale	Paul Kelly	c. 2001	Registered by APRA AMCOS; Presumably written for Silent Partner	
"Clancy of the Overflow" (Banjo Paterson poem)	Paul Kelly	Banjo Paterson; Paul Kelly	2019	Registered by APRA AMCOS; Played live on several occasions, with its debut performance in 2019	
"Come to Your Senses"	None listed	Paul Kelly	Unknown	Registered by APRA AMCOS; Possibly related to Vika & Linda's 1994 song "When Will You Fall For Me"; That song was produced by Kelly and features the lyric, "When will you come to your senses?"	
"Cry Like a Man"	Cleavant Derricks	Tracy Tormé; Paul Kelly	1995	Registered by APRA AMCOS; Broadcast in snippets throughout the pilot episode of Sliders; Available to view in full via Cleavant Derricks' website	
"Deaf Dumb & Blind"	Paul Kelly and the Dots	Unknown	c. 1980	Contained in the National Film and Sound Archive (NFSA); Presumably recorded during the Talk sessions	
"Dear Friends and Gentle Hearts"	Paul Kelly	Paul Kelly	c. 2005	Registered by APRA AMCOS; The song's title was used as the opening line of Kelly's 2014 single with Charlie Owen, titled "Stephen Foster's Last Waltz"	
"Devil Please"	Costar	David McComb; Paul Kelly	c. 1997	Registered by APRA AMCOS; A demo version was recorded by Graham Lee in the front room of his house; This recording was previously available via The Triffids' website and remains bootlegged online	
"Do Right Man"	Cast of Funerals and Circuses	Paul Kelly	1992	Registered by APRA AMCOS; Written and performed for the 1992 play Funerals and Circuses; Included in Kelly's 1993 book Lyrics under the Funerals and Circuses chapter; A bootleg recording exists online	
"Don't Look Down"	Paul Kelly and the Dots	Unknown	1980	Contained in the National Film and Sound Archive (NFSA); Recorded during the Talk sessions	
"Down the Track"	None listed	Paul Kelly	Unknown	Registered by APRA AMCOS	
"Eyes"	None listed	Paul Kelly	Unknown	Registered by APRA AMCOS	
"Farewell to English" (Michael Hartnett poem)	Paul Kelly & Camille O'Sullivan with Feargal Murray	Paul Kelly; Camille O'Sullivan; Feargal Murray; Michael Hartnett	2016	Registered by APRA AMCOS; Performed live during the Ancient Rain stage production	
"Finale"	Cast of Funerals and Circuses	Paul Kelly	1992	Registered by APRA AMCOS; Written and performed for the 1992 play Funerals and Circuses; Included in Kelly's 1993 book Lyrics under the Funerals and Circuses chapter as "Finale Song"; A bootleg recording exists online	
"Flesh and Blood"	Paul Kelly and the Dots	Jim Beasley	1980	Contained in the National Film and Sound Archive (NFSA); Recorded during the Talk sessions	
"Funeral Blues" (W. H. Auden poem)	Paul Kelly	W. H. Auden; Paul Kelly	2019	Registered by APRA AMCOS; Played live at least once, with its debut performance in 2019	
"Furtive Feel"	Bongo Fury	Ray Pereira; Paul Kelly	Unknown	Registered by APRA AMCOS	
"Gatekeeper"	Paul Kelly & Gerry Hale	Paul Kelly; Gerry Hale	c. 2001	Registered by APRA AMCOS; Presumably written for Silent Partner	
"Girl from the Alt Country"	Dan Kelly	Dan Kelly; Paul Kelly	Unknown	Registered by APRA AMCOS; Also known as "Don't You Be Counting on Me"	
"Give Me One More Chance"	Paul Kelly	Paul Kelly	c. 1985	Registered by APRA AMCOS; Included in Kelly's 1993 book Lyrics under the Post chapter; Also performed live by Vika and Linda	
"Got It on My Mind"	Paul Kelly	Paul Kelly	Unknown	Registered by APRA AMCOS	
"He Was a Friend of Mine"	Paul Kelly	Paul Kelly; Charlie Owen	Unknown	Registered by APRA AMCOS	
"Here I Lie"	Mairead Hannan & Rens van der Zalm	Paul Kelly	2009	Registered by APRA AMCOS; Performed for the 2009 theatre adaptation of One Night the Moon; A live recording exists online	
"Here on the Cross"	Paul Kelly	Paul Kelly	Unknown	Registered by APRA AMCOS	
"Hide Your Love Away"	None listed	Paul Kelly	Unknown	Registered by APRA AMCOS	
"Highway"	None listed	Sam Brown; Reuben Gosfield; Peter Busher; Paul Kelly	Unknown	Registered by APRA AMCOS; Presumably for Lucky Oceans	
"Hold On"	None listed	Paul Kelly	Unknown	Registered by APRA AMCOS	
"Hurrah for Mary"	Josephine Kelly	Paul Kelly	Unknown	Registered by APRA AMCOS; Written and performed by Kelly's mother Josephine for his sister Mary Jo; Recited by Mary Jo in the 2012 documentary Stories of Me; While credited to Kelly in its APRA AMCOS registration, this is likely a misattribution	
"I Am What I Am"	Cast of Funerals and Circuses	Paul Kelly	1992	Registered by APRA AMCOS; Written and performed for the 1992 play Funerals and Circuses; Included in Kelly's 1993 book Lyrics under the Funerals and Circuses chapter; A bootleg recording exists online	
"I Can Only Give You Everything" (Them cover)	Paul Kelly and the Dots	Philip Coulter; Tommy Scott †	1981	Contained in the National Film and Sound Archive (NFSA); Recorded live as part of a 1981 performance at Bombay Rock; A bootleg live recording from a 1982 performance at the Ivanhoe Hotel exists online	
"I Scattered My Seeds in Tears Now I'm Gonna Gather My Fruits in Joy"	None listed	Paul Kelly	Unknown	Listed in the lyrics section of Kelly's website	
"I'm Gonna Get You"	None listed	Christine Anu; Paul Kelly	Unknown	Registered by APRA AMCOS; Presumably intended for Christine Anu	
"I'm Still Hungry"	Paul Kelly	Unknown	1994	Contained in the National Film and Sound Archive (NFSA); Recorded during a soundcheck for Kelly's performance Live at the Continental on 20 September 1994	
"If You Believe"	Paul Kelly	Paul Kelly	Unknown	Registered by APRA AMCOS	
"If You Won't Give Me Your Lovin'"	Paul Kelly and the Dots	Paul Kelly	1979	Contained in the National Film and Sound Archive (NFSA); Presumably recorded during the The Dots sessions	
"It's the Eyes"	Paul Kelly and the Dots	Paul Kelly	1979	Contained in the National Film and Sound Archive (NFSA); Presumably recorded during the The Dots sessions	
"It's Too Late to Turn Back Now"	Paul Kelly	Paul Kelly; Bill McDonald; Dan Kelly; Dan Luscombe; Peter Luscombe	c. 2004	Registered by APRA AMCOS; Presumably written during the Ways & Means sessions	
"Jessie's Lullaby"	Cast of Funerals and Circuses	Paul Kelly	1992	Registered by APRA AMCOS; Written and performed for the 1992 play Funerals and Circuses; Included in Kelly's 1993 book Lyrics under the Funerals and Circuses chapter; A bootleg recording exists online	
"Keep On Rolling"	Paul Kelly	Paul Kelly; Bill McDonald; Dan Kelly; Dan Luscombe; Peter Luscombe	c. 2004	Registered by APRA AMCOS; Presumably written during the Ways & Means sessions	
"Lazarus"	Paul Kelly and the Dots	Paul Kelly	1980	Contained in the National Film and Sound Archive (NFSA); Also known as "Lazarus Save My Girl"; Recorded during the Talk sessions	
"Life and Limb"	None listed	Paul Kelly; Chris Langman	Unknown	Registered by APRA AMCOS	
"Lock and Key"	Paul Kelly	Paul Kelly; John Clifforth	Unknown	Registered by APRA AMCOS	
"Love Her with a Feeling"	Paul Kelly and the Dots	Unknown	1979	Contained in the National Film and Sound Archive (NFSA); Presumably recorded during the The Dots sessions	
"Love Is Cruel"	The Debutantes	Paul Kelly	1977	Recorded for a 4-track demo sent to local radio stations; A bootleg recording exists online	
"Loyalty"	Paul Kelly & Gerry Hale	Paul Kelly	c. 2001	Registered by APRA AMCOS; Presumably written for Silent Partner	
"Magdalena"	Paul Kelly	Unknown	1997	Contained in the National Film and Sound Archive (NFSA); Presumably recorded during the Words and Music sessions	
"Making Hay While the Sun Shines"	Paul Kelly and the Boon Companions	Paul Kelly; Bill McDonald; Dan Kelly; Dan Luscombe; Peter Luscombe	2004	Registered by APRA AMCOS; Written for and included in an episode of Fireflies	
"Money Money"	Paul Kelly	Steve Hadley; Bruce Haymes; Paul Kelly; Peter Luscombe	c. 1999	Registered by APRA AMCOS; Presumably for Professor Ratbaggy and written during the Professor Ratbaggy sessions; Possibly related to Professor Ratbaggy's 1999 song "Moni, Make It Good"	
"Morgue"	Paul Kelly & Dan Luscombe	Paul Kelly; Dan Luscombe	2006	Registered by APRA AMCOS; Written and recorded for Jindabyne	
"Never Never Never"	Cast of Funerals and Circuses	Paul Kelly	1992	Registered by APRA AMCOS; Written and performed for the 1992 play Funerals and Circuses; Included in Kelly's 1993 book Lyrics under the Funerals and Circuses chapter; A bootleg recording exists online	
"Nightime Nona"	Cast of Funerals and Circuses	Paul Kelly	1992	Registered by APRA AMCOS; Written and performed for the 1992 play Funerals and Circuses; Included in Kelly's 1993 book Lyrics under the Funerals and Circuses chapter; A bootleg recording exists online	
"Nobody Knows Nona"	Cast of Funerals and Circuses	Paul Kelly	1992	Registered by APRA AMCOS; Written and performed for the 1992 play Funerals and Circuses; Included in Kelly's 1993 book Lyrics under the Funerals and Circuses chapter; A bootleg recording exists online	
"Nothing Lost, Nothing Gained"	Paul Kelly and the Boon Companions	Paul Kelly; Bill McDonald; Dan Kelly; Dan Luscombe; Peter Luscombe	2004	Registered by APRA AMCOS; Written for and included in an episode of Fireflies	
"Now That You're Gone"	Stuart Grant	Stuart Grant; Paul Kelly	Unknown	Registered by APRA AMCOS	
"Nunga Tow Ngeerin (People Stop Crying)"	Cast of Funerals and Circuses	Paul Kelly; Lily Sansbury	1992	Registered by APRA AMCOS; Written and performed for the 1992 play Funerals and Circuses; Included in Kelly's 1993 book Lyrics under the Funerals and Circuses chapter; A bootleg recording exists online	
"On the Rocks"	Paul Kelly & Dan Luscombe	Paul Kelly; Dan Luscombe	2006	Registered by APRA AMCOS; Also known as "The Rocks Going to Do with You"; Written and recorded for Jindabyne	
"One So Young"	Cast of Funerals and Circuses	Paul Kelly	1992	Registered by APRA AMCOS; Written and performed for the 1992 play Funerals and Circuses; Included in Kelly's 1993 book Lyrics under the Funerals and Circuses chapter; A bootleg recording exists online	
"Pauly Was My Darling"	Josephine Kelly	Paul Kelly	Unknown	Registered by APRA AMCOS; Written and performed by Kelly's mother Josephine; Recited by Josephine in the 2012 documentary Stories of Me; While credited to Kelly in its APRA AMCOS registration, this is likely a misattribution	
"Possum Woman's Song and Dance"	Cast of Funerals and Circuses	Paul Kelly	1992	Registered by APRA AMCOS; Written and performed for the 1992 play Funerals and Circuses; Included in Kelly's 1993 book Lyrics under the Funerals and Circuses chapter; A bootleg recording exists online	
"Puluka Inma"	Cast of Funerals and Circuses	Paul Kelly	1992	Registered by APRA AMCOS; Written and performed for the 1992 play Funerals and Circuses; Included in Kelly's 1993 book Lyrics under the Funerals and Circuses chapter; A bootleg recording exists online	
"Salty Sweet"	Paul Kelly	Steve Hadley; Bruce Haymes; Paul Kelly; Peter Luscombe	c. 1999	Registered by APRA AMCOS; Presumably for Professor Ratbaggy and written during the Professor Ratbaggy sessions	
"Sarah Jane"	Paul Kelly	Paul Kelly	c. 2012	Registered by APRA AMCOS; Included in Kelly's 2012 book Don't Start Me Talking: Lyrics 1984–2012 under the Spring and Fall chapter	
"Say Goodbye"	Paul Kelly and the Dots	Paul Kelly	1980	Contained in the National Film and Sound Archive (NFSA); Presumably recorded during the Talk sessions	
"Scratch Up!"	Paul Kelly and the Dots	Paul Kelly	1982	Demo contained in the National Film and Sound Archive (NFSA); Presumably recorded during the Manila sessions	
"Shane's Dream"	Paul Kelly	Paul Kelly; Shane O'Mara	1994	Contained in the National Film and Sound Archive (NFSA); Also known as "Truck Called Linda"; A bootleg live recording from a 1994 performance at the Regal Theatre, Perth exists online	
"She's Nobody She Knows"	None listed	Gyan Evans; Paul Kelly; Dave Dobbyn	c. 1991	Registered by APRA AMCOS; Also known as "She's No One" or "Nobody She Knows"; Included in Kelly's 1993 book Lyrics under the Comedy chapter	
"She's Not Dead, She's Just Sleeping"	None listed	Paul Kelly	Unknown	Registered by APRA AMCOS	
"She's Off to the Races"	Paul Kelly	Paul Kelly	2006	Registered by APRA AMCOS; Written and recorded for Jindabyne	
"Smooth It Over"	None listed	Paul Kelly	Unknown	Registered by APRA AMCOS	
"Soliloquy"	Paul Kelly	Paul Kelly	Unknown	Registered by APRA AMCOS	
"Song for Stephen"	Paul Kelly	Paul Kelly	c. 2012	Registered by APRA AMCOS; Included in Kelly's 2012 book Don't Start Me Talking: Lyrics 1984–2012 under the Spring and Fall chapter	
"Sorry"	Paul Kelly	Paul Kelly	1982	Contained in the National Film and Sound Archive (NFSA); Presumably recorded during the Manila sessions	
"Stand by Me"	Paul Kelly and the Dots	Unknown	1981	Contained in the National Film and Sound Archive (NFSA); Presumably recorded during the Talk sessions	
"Stowaway"	None listed	Paul Kelly; Fiona McDonald	Unknown	Registered by APRA AMCOS	
"The Going Down"	Paul Kelly	Paul Kelly	1974	Kelly's first written song; Also known as "It's the Falling Apart That Makes You"; A recording was never made	
"The Hungry Grass" (Donagh MacDonagh poem)	Paul Kelly	Donagh MacDonagh; Paul Kelly	Unknown	Registered by APRA AMCOS	
"The Mother" (Patrick Pearse poem)	Paul Kelly & Camille O'Sullivan with Feargal Murray	Patrick Pearse; Paul Kelly	2016	Registered by APRA AMCOS; Performed live during the Ancient Rain stage production	
"The Statue of the Virgin at Granard Speaks" (Paula Meehan poem)	Paul Kelly & Camille O'Sullivan with Feargal Murray	Paula Meehan; Paul Kelly; Camille O'Sullivan; Feargal Murray	2016	Registered by APRA AMCOS; Performed live during the Ancient Rain stage production	
"The Tap Song"	Cast of Funerals and Circuses	Paul Kelly	1992	Registered by APRA AMCOS; Written and performed for the 1992 play Funerals and Circuses; Included in Kelly's 1993 book Lyrics under the Funerals and Circuses chapter; A bootleg recording exists online	
"They Don't Have to Do My Dirty Job"	Cast of Funerals and Circuses	Paul Kelly	1992	Registered by APRA AMCOS; Written and performed for the 1992 play Funerals and Circuses; Included in Kelly's 1993 book Lyrics under the Funerals and Circuses chapter; A bootleg recording exists online	
"Things I Didn't Say"	Paul Kelly and the Coloured Girls	Paul Kelly	1987	Contained in the National Film and Sound Archive (NFSA); Recorded as part of a 'rough mixes' compilation during the Under the Sun sessions; A bootleg live recording from a 1986 performance on 2SER exists online	
"Time Will Cheat Us"	The Debutantes	Paul Kelly	1977	Recorded for a 4-track demo sent to local radio stations; A bootleg recording exists online	
"Time Will Cheat Us"	Paul Kelly and the Dots	Paul Kelly	1980	Contained in the National Film and Sound Archive (NFSA); Presumably recorded during the Talk sessions	
"To and Fro"	None listed	Paul Kelly	Unknown	Registered by APRA AMCOS; Also known as "To and From"	
"Tom White"	Paul Kelly and the Boon Companions	Paul Kelly; Dan Luscombe	2004	Registered by APRA AMCOS; Written for and included in the 2004 film Tom White	
"Tonight Our Fires Are Burning"	Paul Kelly	Paul Kelly; Dan Kelly	c. 2008	Registered by APRA AMCOS; Included in Kelly's 2012 book Don't Start Me Talking: Lyrics 1984–2012 under the Spring and Fall chapter	
"Too Much of a Good Thing"	Paul Kelly and the Coloured Girls	Paul Kelly	1986	Presumably recorded during the Gossip sessions; A bootleg recording exists online	
"Trap"	Paul Kelly	Paul Kelly	Unknown	Registered by APRA AMCOS	
"Treblinka"	Paul Kelly	Paul Kelly	Unknown	Registered by APRA AMCOS	
"Up Down In Out"	Cast of Funerals and Circuses	Paul Kelly	1992	Registered by APRA AMCOS; Written and performed for the 1992 play Funerals and Circuses; Included in Kelly's 1993 book Lyrics under the Funerals and Circuses chapter as "Finale Song"; A bootleg recording exists online	
"View from the Ridge"	Paul Kelly and the Boon Companions	Paul Kelly; Bill McDonald; Dan Kelly; Dan Luscombe; Peter Luscombe	2004	Registered by APRA AMCOS; Written for and included in an episode of Fireflies	
"Visions"	Paul Kelly	Paul Kelly	Unknown	Registered by APRA AMCOS	
"War Music"	James Ledger	James Ledger; Paul Kelly	2015	Registered by APRA AMCOS; Commissioned and performed live by the Sydney Symphony Orchestra in April 2015	
"We Can Talk It Out"	None listed	Paul Kelly; Maurice Frawley	Unknown	Registered by APRA AMCOS	
"Why Do You Still Love Me"	None listed	Paul Kelly	Unknown	Registered by APRA AMCOS	
"Wild Honey"	None listed	Paul Kelly	1997	Contained in the National Film and Sound Archive (NFSA); Recorded during the Words and Music sessions	
"Woman in the Wall"	Paul Kelly & Dan Luscombe	Paul Kelly; Dan Luscombe	2006	Registered by APRA AMCOS; Written and recorded for Jindabyne	
"You Better Look Twice"	Paul Kelly and the Dots	Unknown	1981	Contained in the National Film and Sound Archive (NFSA); Presumably recorded during the Talk sessions	
"You Call This Living"	Paul Kelly and the Dots	Unknown	1981	Contained in the National Film and Sound Archive (NFSA); Recorded live as part of a 1981 performance at Bombay Rock; A bootleg live recording from a 1982 performance at the Ivanhoe Hotel exists online	
"You Can Do Better Than That"	None listed	Paul Kelly	Unknown	Registered by APRA AMCOS	
"You Go Your Way"	None listed	Paul Kelly	Unknown	Registered by APRA AMCOS	
"You Made My Mind Up for Me"	None listed	Paul Kelly; Stuart Grant	Unknown	Registered by APRA AMCOS	
"You'll Be the First to Know"	The Messengers	Paul Kelly	Unknown	Registered by APRA AMCOS	
