= Won't You Come Around =

2003 extended play by Paul Kelly

EP by Paul Kelly
- Released: 3 November 2003
- Genre: Folk rock
- Length: 23:38
- Label: EMI
- Producer: Paul Kelly; Tchad Blake

Won't You Come Around is an EP released by Australian folk rock musician Paul Kelly and his band on 3 November 2003 by EMI. The EP peaked at No. 55 on the Australian Recording Industry Association (ARIA) Australian Singles Charts. Kelly's nephew, Dan Kelly joins the Paul Kelly Band to share vocals, guitar and songwriting.

== Background ==
The EP preceded the 2004 release of the double album, Ways and Means, from which the title track and "Little Bit O' Sugar" were taken. It also features a live performance covering Nick Cave and the Bad Seeds' "Nobody's Baby Now" and a cover of The Band's "Christmas Must Be Tonight" (from their 1977 album, Islands). "Emotional" was originally released on Kelly's website with the longer title "I Guess I Get a Little Emotional Sometimes". It is a political song about the plight of refugees who were imprisoned at Woomera. Kelly performed "Won't You Come Around" live on the SBS television musical quiz, RocKwiz before performing in a duet with Little Birdy's Katy Steele.

== Track listing ==
All tracks written by Paul Kelly, except where noted.

1. "Won't You Come Around" – 3:32
2. "Emotional" – 5:03
3. "Nobody's Baby Now" (live) (Nick Cave) – 4:50
4. "Christmas Must Be Tonight" (Robbie Robertson) – 4:10
5. "Little Bit O' Sugar" (Paul Kelly, Dan Kelly) – 6:03

== Personnel ==
Paul Kelly Band members

- Steve Hadley – bass guitar
- Bruce Haymes – keyboards, organ (Hammond)
- Dan Kelly – guitar, vocals
- Paul Kelly – guitar, vocals
- Peter Luscombe – drums
- Bill McDonald – bass
- Shane O'Mara – guitar

Additional musicians

- Gerry Hale – fiddle
- Glen King – drums
- Richard Pleasance – vocals
- Russell Smith – trombone, trumpet
- Greg Walker – guitar, vocals, keyboards

Recording details

- Leah Baker – assistant
- Tchad Blake – producer, engineer, mixing
- Alison Chains – design
- Paul Grady – assistant
- Paul Kelly – producer
- Richard Pleasance – producer, engineer, instrumentation
- Adam Rhodes – assistant
- Chris Thompson – engineer, mixing
- Greg Walker – mixing, engineer, producer

== Charts ==
Chart performance for Won't You Come Around
Chart (2001)	Peak position
Australia (ARIA)	55
