= Statler & Waldorf (musicians) =

Australian electronic music production group

- Origin: Brisbane, Queensland, Australia
- Genres: Electronic
- Years active: 2001–2006
- Labels: Freefall; Ghost/MRA
- Past members: Dennis Gascoigne (a.k.a. Statler); Cameron Hales; Leo Hede (a.k.a. Waldorf)
- Website: statlerandwaldorf.com

Statler & Waldorf are an Australian electronic music group and production duo formed in Brisbane in 2001. The founders were Dennis Gascoigne on synthesisers and vocals (a.k.a. Agent 86, Statler) and Cameron Hales as turntablist (a.k.a. Camschwa; ex-Subito). They were joined by Leo Hede on Ableton and FX (a.k.a. Luminary, Waldorf) in early 2003, with Hales leaving at the end of that year. They released an extended play, Collusions (October 2004), and a studio album, AndroNovaVirus (October 2005), before disbanding in 2006.

During 2005, Gascogine and Hede had joined with former Australian Idol finalists, Chanel Cole and Daniel Belle as a briefly existing trip hop four-piece group, Spook. They also issued a studio album, The Dusk Sessions, on the same date, which reached No. 24 on the ARIA Dance Albums Chart.

== History ==
Statler & Waldorf were formed in Brisbane as an electronic music duo by Dennis Gascoigne on synthesisers and vocals (a.k.a. Agent 86, and then Statler) and Cameron Hales as turntablist (a.k.a. Camschwa; ex-Subito). The band name references like characters from The Muppet Show and related feature films, "'the two old guys up in the box on the Muppets,' Gascoigne explains. 'You know the ones that just hate everything?'"

Gascoigne had grown up in Warialda and started playing guitar at age 14. While attending university in Brisbane he was in a group, Bob, which "was quickly superseded by Seethe, a Skate punk band which over its three or so year life enjoyed some success playing with bands like Grinspoon, Lagwagon, Nitocris..." Seethe disbanded, and he qualified as an engineer.

Early in 2003 they were joined by Leo Hede on Ableton and FX (a.k.a. Luminary, and then Waldorf). Hede had piano and recorder lessons in primary school and followed with bass guitar in high school. He was briefly in a high school group, Wraith Flakes, which "enjoyed success and notoriety at the 3 gigs they played at high school dances." Gascoigne recalled the formation of the trio version of Statler and Waldorf, "We weren't always a three-piece though. Back in 2001, Camschwa and I started producing tracks for a couple of DJs around town. Eventually we got the bug to put it together as a set and started playing it live. Luminary joined us in 2003 to expand the live performance component."

Matt Fraser of Time Off magazine caught one of the trio's gigs, "[they are] playing an intriguing blend of house, soul and hip-hop... Onstage, the band is a frenzy of movement, with a turntablist and two boys behind a mountain of synths and samplers – no drums or guitar to be seen. The group readily uses new and old samples in their music, many of which are very recognisable to the punters." Hales left the group late in 2003 – they reverted to a duo of Gascoigne and Hede.

Their debut five-track extended play, Collusions (October 2004), was issued via Freefall Records/MRA Entertainment. Gascoigne explained, he and "Hales [were] performing locally and writing tracks with other artists for our EP – at that point we were fairly breaks orientated." Guesting on vocals on the EP are Miss Brown (a.k.a. J Hampstead) for two tracks, Blue MC on "Bass Buffer", Paul Kelly on "So Fine", and Sanyasa on "Burne".

Alex Ollo of Cyclic Defrost enthused over its lead track, "Bass Buffer", "[it] will be a hit by the time you read this... [a] bouncy fusion of house and hip hop with Jamaican style vocals from Blue MC, it's an infectious singalong crossover that is poppy without being twee, clubby yet radio friendly, edgy without being annoying. And it will fill the floor every time."

The Scene Magazine's Alex Roche noticed that the EP, "is a delicious collection of collaborations with some of this country's finest singers... [and] is a superb disc for warming up on Friday night or chilling out early Saturday morning, for clearing out the cobwebs of the working week. Check it out."

The group played festivals including Big Day Out, alongside the Chemical Brothers. They remixed material by Sarah Blasko and had their own music remixed by Segue Samplist. Hede described the group after the EP, "Our sound... was fairly influenced by Camschwa... We're a lot harder and heavier now, with a lot straighter beats, a lot more of a club sound."

Statler & Waldorf's debut studio album, AndroNovaVirus, appeared in October 2005 via Ghost Records/MRA Entertainment. Chanel Cole (former Australian Idol finalist) guested on vocals. Its title acknowledges the Andromeda Alesis and Nord Nova II keyboards, which the duo used. Joann Curtis of In the Mix posits their sonation is, "hypnotically minimal, obliquely rhythmic and uniquely aesthetic... I have seen Statler and Waldorf perform to different crowds – from teenagers, to fans, to unsuspecting punters – and each time, the response is enthusiastic. Such is the testimony to their live performance. And the brilliance of their production talents captures much of the essence from their live performance on their new album – as intended."

Carmine Pascuzzi of Mediasearch felt the duo "bring their own unique identity to this eclectic and delicious set of tracks. They work very cohesively and sharply in their electro beats and fuse styles ranging from trance to punk-rock elements. Their power has seen them acclaimed as one of Australia's best live dance acts and this album cements their position in musical originality and creativity."Cyclic Frost's Matthew Levison opined, "This is lowest common denominator music, all boxes ticked... Painful, preset, mundane and monotonous. If this is the only resistance to our system, then it's no wonder Australia is so conservative right now."

In mid-2005, Gascoigne and Hede collaborated with Cole and her then-domestic partner, Daniel Belle (also from Australian Idol), as a four-piece trip hop group, Spook. McCabe & Downie of The Daily Telegraph detailed how the couple were initially asked "to sing on some tracks" and that "the foursome discovered some major songwriting chemistry." During the collaboration, "Gascoigne... took care of composition and production. Cole delivered lyrics and vocal melodies and Belle discovered a talent for recording intricate harmonies and string arrangements."

On the same date in October as Statler & Waldorf's debut album, Spook provided its sole studio album, The Dusk Sessions, which reached No. 24 on the ARIA Dance Albums Chart. Mediasearch's Gabrielle Phillips elaborated on their style, "a mixture of triphop style beats that can be dark, uplifting, simple and yet emotionally sophisticated all at the same time... Most songs have been contributed and added to by each of the artists, to create a mixture of sounds that is both unexpected and extremely enjoyable."

After Statler & Waldorf disbanded in 2006, Dennis Gascoigne focussed on his professional career gaining a PhD in Molecular Biology and publishing several papers including in the Oxford Journal of BionInformatics, and heading his software development business Civil Pro where he is currently managing director. In 2025 he paired up with David Ryan to form Trovaire with their debut album The Stonefruit Sessions released in April to commercial success. To Leave the Sea and Oh How Lovely from the album both charted in Europe. Leo Hede has worked as a DJ and record producer.

== Discography ==
=== Studio albums ===
- AndroNovaVirus (4 October 2005) – Ghost Records/MRA Entertainment (GM002)
- The Dusk Sessions (2005) as Spook – Ghost Records/MRA Entertainment (GM001)

=== Extended plays ===
- Collusions (October 2004) – Freefall Records/MRA Entertainment
