= Silent Partner (2001 film) =

2001 film by Alkinos Tsilimidos

- DVD cover
- Directed by: Alkinos Tsilimidos
- Written by: Daniel Keene
- Based on: play by Daniel Keene
- Produced by: Alkinos Tsilimidos
- Starring: David Field; Syd Brisbane
- Cinematography: Toby Oliver
- Edited by: Ken Sallows; Alkinos Tsilimidos
- Music by: Gerry Hale; Paul Kelly
- Release date: 2001
- Running time: 84 minutes
- Country: Australia
- Language: English
- Box office: A$33,101 (Australia)

Silent Partner is a 2001 Australian film directed by Alkinos Tsilimidos and starring David Field and Syd Brisbane.

== Plot summary ==
Two no-hoper mates, habitual drinkers and gamblers, are lured by an incognito stranger into paying for, looking after, and racing, a Greyhound which they name "Silent Partner". After a series of unsuccessful runs they are duped into injecting the dog with a stimulant before the race; it dies, but not before winning. Despite mutual recriminations, the two remain friends.

== Cast ==
- David Field as John
- Syd Brisbane as Bill
- Les Andrews as Gatekeeper
- Hebe as "Silent Partner"

== Soundtrack ==
Original songs and instrumentals by Paul Kelly and Gerry Hale from the soundtrack of Silent Partner have been released as an LP album and CD on the Gawd Aggie label – 7243 5 35569 2 1

== See also ==
- Cinema of Australia
