= Manila (album) =

Studio album by Paul Kelly and the Dots
- Released: August 1982
- Recorded: July–August 1981
- Studios: Cinema Audio Studios, Manila
- Genre: Australian Rock
- Length: 46:23
- Label: Mushroom
- Producers: Paul Kelly, Chris Thompson

Paul Kelly and the Dots chronology
Talk (1981)	Manila (1982)	Post (1985)

Singles from Manila
- 1. "Clean this House" Released: April 1982; 2. "Alive and Well" Released: July 1982

Manila is the second album by Australian rock group Paul Kelly and the Dots and was originally released in August 1982 by Mushroom Records and re-released in 1990. The group travelled to the Philippine capital to record Manila during July and August 1981 with Kelly and Chris Thompson producing. Line-up changes and Kelly having his jaw broken in an assault had delayed the album's release by a year. The album contains the singles, "Clean this House", and "Alive and Well" but neither album nor singles had any chart success. All tracks were written, or co-written, by Kelly, including two with guitarist Chris Langman.

== Background ==
Paul Kelly and the Dots had released their debut album Talk in March 1981, which had peaked at No. 38 on the National albums charts, but its third single "Lowdown" released in May had no chart success. Considerable line-up changes had occurred within the Dots since its 1978 formation in Melbourne. The band that travelled to the Philippines in July 1981 with Kelly was Tony Thornton on drums, Alan Brooker on bass guitar, Tim Brosnan on guitar and Michael Holmes on guitar. After returning to Australia, the band became involved in Gillian Armstrong's 1982 film Starstruck which starred Jo Kennedy. Paul Kelly and the Dots supplied "Rocking Institution" for the soundtrack and Kelly added to the score. Acting in a minor role in Starstruck was Kaarin Fairfax, who later became Kelly's second wife. Kelly had replaced Holmes with Maurice Frawley on guitar and Thornton with Huk Treloar on drums. Whilst in Melbourne Kelly was assaulted and had his jaw broken. The single "Clean this House" was released in April, and "Alive and Well" in July, but neither album nor singles had any chart success. The line-up changes and Kelly's broken jaw had delayed the release of Manila until August 1982. The Dots were disbanded and the Paul Kelly Band was formed in 1983, Kelly's next album was the solo release Post which was recorded after he had relocated to Sydney by January 1985.

Kelly later said of the album, "I was heavily under the influence of Sandinista!, the Clash album, at the time. Sandinista! has this kind of 3D thing on it, which I was trying to get on record, but it was my first effort at production so it didn't turn out that great."

Professional ratings
Review scores
Source	Rating
Allmusic	3/5 stars

== Track listing ==
All tracks written by Paul Kelly, except where noted.

1. "Forbidden Street" (Paul Kelly, Chris Langman) – 7:30
2. "Clean this House" – 4:46
3. "Alive and Well" – 3:10
4. "Skidding Hearts" – 3:32
5. "Some Guys" – 4:10
6. "Last Resort" (Kelly, Tony Thornton, Michael Holmes, Alan Brooker, Tim Brosnan) – 5:23
7. "See You in Paradise" – 3:52
8. "Touchy Babe" – 4:21
9. "When the Girl's Not Even English" (Langman, Kelly) – 5:29
10. "Lenny (To Live Is to Burn)" (Kelly, Lenny Bruce) – 4:12

== Personnel ==
Paul Kelly and the Dots members

- Alan Brooker – bass guitar
- Tim Brosnan – guitars
- Michael Holmes – guitars
- Paul Kelly – vocals, guitar
- Tony Thornton – drums

Recording details

- Producer – Paul Kelly, Chris Thompson
- Engineer – Chris Thompson
  - Assistant Engineer – Mike Pimental
- Studio – recorded at Cinema Audio Studios, Manila
  - mixed at Richmond Recorders, Melbourne
