= Paul Kelly (Australian musician) discography =

Paul Kelly discography
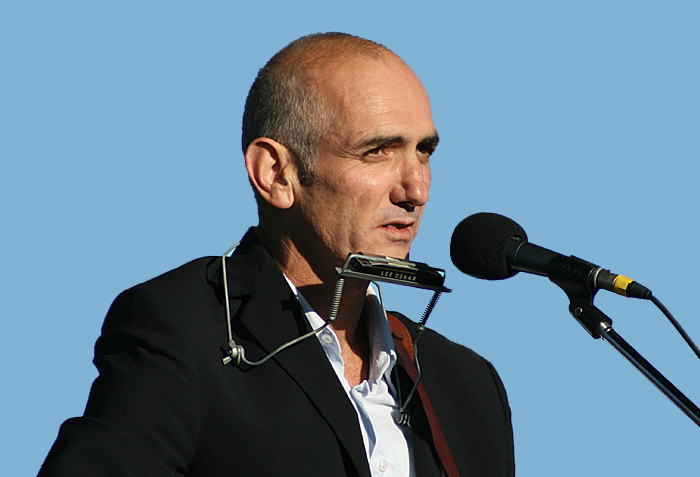
- Paul Kelly, November 2007
- Studio albums: 28
- Extended plays: 4
- Soundtrack albums: 9
- Live albums: 6
- Compilation albums: 8
- Singles: 69
- Video albums: 4
- Music videos: 42

The discography of Paul Kelly, an Australian rock artist, includes solo releases, those from various bands that Paul Kelly has led, (Note: Bands include Paul Kelly Band, Paul Kelly and the Dots (1978–1982), Paul Kelly and the Coloured Girls (1985–1988), Paul Kelly and the Messengers (1987–1991), Paul Kelly and the Boon Companions (2004–current) and Paul Kelly and the Stormwater Boys (2005).) and material from the related projects. Paul Kelly, under various guises, has released twenty-eight studio albums, sixty four singles, forty-two music videos, and contributed to ten film / television soundtracks and scores.

In August 1978, Paul Kelly and the Dots was formed from the remains of Melbourne band High Rise Bombers. In 1979, they released their debut single, "Recognition", on Mushroom Records and followed with other singles in 1980 including "Billy Baxter" in October, which peaked at No. 38 on the National singles charts. Their debut album Talk followed in March 1981, which peaked at No. 44 on the National albums charts. Their single "Alive and Well", from the second album, Manila, had a video clip directed by Jack Egan in July 1982. After the Dots folded in late 1982, Kelly was without a recording contract. The Paul Kelly Band was formed in 1983, however by late 1984, Kelly had disbanded this group. His next solo release was the single "From St Kilda to Kings Cross" in April 1985, with the associated album Post.

By mid-1985, Kelly had formed Paul Kelly and the Coloured Girls and their first single was "Before Too Long" in June 1986, which peaked at No. 15 and was followed by a double LP Gossip in September, which peaked at No. 15. Gossip was trimmed back to a single LP for its 1987 international release on A&M Records under the name Paul Kelly and the Messengers. Australian releases still used Paul Kelly and the Coloured Girls. "To Her Door" was released in September 1987 and peaked at No. 14 on the Australian singles charts. "Dumb Things", another single from the album Under the Sun, was released in 1988 in Australia, and the US. By 1989's So Much Water So Close to Home album the band were known as Paul Kelly and the Messengers in all markets, the album peaked at No. 10 with the next album Comedy from 1991 peaking at No. 12, but despite this success Paul Kelly and the Messengers disbanded in August 1991 with Hidden Things released in May 1992. Kelly was already touring as a solo artist and recorded Live, May 1992, he subsequently recorded further material under his own name, as the Paul Kelly Band, Paul Kelly and the Boon Companions, and Paul Kelly and the Stormwater Boys.

In 1999, Kelly left Mushroom Records and signed with EMI Music to release Smoke by Paul Kelly with Uncle Bill, which is a bluegrass band; released at the same time was Professor Ratbaggy by Professor Ratbaggy, a dub reggae group formed by Kelly with members of the Paul Kelly Band. Kelly toured with both Uncle Bill and Professor Ratbaggy. In a similar way Paul Kelly and the Boon Companions released Ways & Means in 2004 and became Stardust Five to release Stardust Five in 2006. In 2004, the Australian Broadcasting Corporation television series Fireflies featured a score by Kelly and Stephen Rae, the associated soundtrack CD Fireflies: Songs of Paul Kelly included tracks by Kelly, Paul Kelly and the Boon Companions, Professor Ratbaggy, Paul Kelly with Uncle Bill, and "Los Cucumbros" by the Boon Companions featuring Sian Prior, which was later a track on Stardust Five. Stolen Apples from 2007 was credited to Paul Kelly and followed by the live DVD Live Apples in April 2008 credited to Paul Kelly and the Boon Companions.

== Albums ==
=== Studio albums ===
List of studio albums, with selected chart positions and certifications
Title	Album details	Peak chart positions		Certifications (sales thresholds)
Title	Album details	AUS	NZ	Certifications (sales thresholds)
Talk	Released: 30 March 1981 (Note: Released by Paul Kelly and the Dots (1978–1982).); Label: Mushroom; Formats: LP; Producer: Martin Armiger, Paul Kelly, Joe Camilleri, Trevor Lucas	44	—	
Manila	Released: August 1982; Label: Mushroom; Formats: LP; Producer: Kelly, Chris Thompson	—	—	
Post	Released: May 1985 (Note: Released by Paul Kelly as a solo artist or with the Paul Kelly Band.); Label: Mushroom; Formats: LP; Producer: Clive Shakespeare, Kelly	—	—	
Gossip	Released: 22 September 1986 (Note: Released by Paul Kelly and the Coloured Girls in Australian and New Zealand markets (1985–1988), released by Paul Kelly and the Messengers in North American and European markets (1987–1988).) (Note: Gossip and associated singles were the first North American and European releases by Kelly, they were released on A&M Records from 1987 under the name Paul Kelly and the Messengers instead of Paul Kelly and the Coloured Girls.); Label: Mushroom / A&M Records; Formats: 2× LP, MC; Producer: Alan Thorne, Kelly	15	34	ARIA: Gold
Under the Sun	Released: 7 December 1987; Label: Mushroom / A&M; Formats: LP, CD; Producer: Thorne, Kelly	19	25	ARIA: Platinum
So Much Water So Close to Home	Released: 20 August 1989 (Note: Released by Paul Kelly and the Messengers in all markets (1989–1991).); Label: Mushroom / A&M; Formats: LP, CD; Producer: Scott Litt, Paul Kelly	10	26	ARIA: Gold
Comedy	Released: 26 May 1991; Label: Mushroom / A&M / Dr Dream; Formats: 2× LP, CD; Producer: Thorne, Kelly	12	24	
Hidden Things	Released: 5 April 1992; Label: Mushroom; Formats: CD; Producer: Thorne, Kelly, Gavin MacKillop	29	39	
Wanted Man	Released: 19 June 1994; Label: Mushroom / Vanguard; Formats: CD, MC; Producer: Kelly, Randy Jacobs, David Bridie	11	19	
Deeper Water	Released: 12 September 1995; Label: Mushroom / Vanguard; Formats: CD, MC; Producer: Kelly, Jacobs, Kerryn Tolhurst, Simon Polinski	40	30	
Words and Music	Released: 10 May 1998; Label: Mushroom / Vanguard; Formats: CD; Producer: Mark Opitz, Polinski, Kelly, Laurence Maddy	17	44	ARIA: Gold
Smoke (with Uncle Bill)	Released: 18 October 1999; Label: EMI Music; Formats: CD; Producer: Kelly, Gerry Hale	36	—	ARIA: Gold
...Nothing but a Dream	Released: 26 August 2001; Label: EMI / Cooking Vinyl; Formats: CD; Producer: Kelly, Wallis, Mick Harvey	7	46	ARIA: Gold
Ways & Means	Released: 17 February 2004 (Note: Released by Paul Kelly on CD but associated DVD released by Paul Kelly and the Boon Companions: Dan Luscombe, Peter Luscombe, Dan Kelly, Paul Kelly, Bill McDonald.); Label: EMI / Capitol Records / Cooking Vinyl / True North; Formats: CD; Producer: Tchad Blake, Kelly	13	—	ARIA: Gold
Foggy Highway	Released: 30 May 2005 (Note: Released by Paul Kelly and the Stormwater Boys.); Label: Gawd Aggie / EMI / Capitol; Formats: CD, digital download; Producer: Kelly, Rod McCormack	22	—	ARIA: Gold
Stolen Apples	Released: 7 July 2007; Label: EMI; Formats: CD, digital download; Producer: Paul Kelly and the Boon Companions	8	—	ARIA: Gold
Spring and Fall	Released: 19 October 2012; Label: Gawd Aggie; Formats: CD, digital download; Producer: Paul Kelly, Dan Kelly, J Walker	8	—	ARIA: Gold
The Merri Soul Sessions	Released: 12 December 2014; Label: Gawd Aggie, Universal Music Australia; Formats: CD, digital download; Producer: Steve Schram	17	—	
Seven Sonnets and a Song	Released: 22 April 2016; Label: Gawd Aggie, Universal Music Australia; Formats: CD, digital download	9	—	
Death's Dateless Night (with Charlie Owen)	Released: 7 October 2016; Label: Gawd Aggie; Formats: CD, digital download	16	—	
Life Is Fine	Released: 11 August 2017; Label: EMI Music/Cooking Vinyl; Formats: CD, vinyl, digital download	1	— (Note: Life Is Fine did not enter the NZ Top 40 Albums Chart, but peaked at number one on the NZ Heatseekers Albums Chart.)	ARIA: Gold
Nature	Released: 12 October 2018; Label: EMI Music/Cooking Vinyl; Formats: CD, vinyl, digital download	1	40	
Thirteen Ways to Look at Birds (with James Ledger featuring Alice Keath and Seraphim Trio)	Released: 30 August 2019; Label: Paul Kelly; Formats: CD, digital download	43	—	
Forty Days	Released: 12 June 2020; Label: Paul Kelly; Formats: digital download, streaming	—	—	
Please Leave Your Light On (with Paul Grabowsky)	Released: 31 July 2020; Label: Paul Kelly, EMI Music; Formats: CD, digital download, streaming, LP	3	—	
Paul Kelly's Christmas Train	Released: 19 November 2021; Label: Paul Kelly, EMI Music; Formats: CD, digital download, streaming, LP	1	—	
Fever Longing Still	Released: 1 November 2024; Label: Paul Kelly, EMI Music; Formats: CD, digital download, streaming, LP	3	—	
Seventy	Released: 7 November 2025; Label: Paul Kelly, EMI Music	2	—	
"—" denotes releases that did not chart or were not released in that country.

=== Live albums ===
List of live albums, with selected chart positions, certifications and notes
Title	Album details	Peak chart positions	Certifications (sales thresholds)	Notes
Title	Album details	AUS	Certifications (sales thresholds)	Notes
Live, May 1992	Released: October 1992; Label: Mushroom Records; Format: 2× CD	72		Solo live performances on 10 May 1992 at the Regal Theatre in Perth and 17 May at the Athenaeum Theatre in Melbourne.
Live at the Continental and the Esplanade	Released: 23 July 1996; Label: White, Mushroom / Vanguard; Format: CD	—		Live performances by Paul Kelly Band from The Continental in Prahran on 19 September 1994 and the Esplanade Hotel in St. Kilda on 29 May 1995.
The A – Z Recordings	Released: 24 September 2010; Label: Gawd Aggie, Universal Music; Format: 8× CD box set	118		Live performances by Paul Kelly for his A – Z Tours from 2004 to 2010. 105 tracks are listed alphabetically, they were typically performed over four nights. Kelly's memoir, How to Make Gravy, is the written companion to this box set.
Conversations with Ghosts (with James Ledger, Genevieve Lacey & ANAM Musicians)	Released: August 2013; Label: ABC; Format: CD	65		For a theatre production of the same name. First performed at Elisabeth Murdoch Hall, Melbourne in October 2012.
Goin' Your Way (by Neil Finn and Paul Kelly)	Released: 8 November 2013; Label: EMI Music; Format: 2× CD, DVD, BD	5	ARIA: Gold	Live performance by Kelly and Neil Finn at the Sydney Opera House in early 2013. They were backed by Dan Kelly on guitar, Elroy Finn on drums, Zoe Hauptmann on guitar and bass guitar.
Live at the Sydney Opera House	Released: 26 April 2019; Label: ABC / UMA; Format: 2× CD	61		
"—" denotes releases that did not chart or were not released in that country.

=== Compilation albums ===
List of compilation albums, with selected chart positions, certifications and notes
Title	Album details	Peak chart positions		Certifications (sales thresholds)	Notes
Title	Album details	AUS	NZ	Certifications (sales thresholds)	Notes
Songs from the South	Released: 13 May 1997; Label: White / Mushroom; Format: CD	2	17	ARIA: 7× Platinum	Compilation subtitled Paul Kelly's Greatest Hits, also released with a bonus disc featuring "Tease Me" / "It Started with a Kiss".
Songs from the South Volume 2	Released: 8 November 2008 (Note: Release date of compilation album announced on Paul Kelly's official website and by media release.); Label: EMI / Capitol; Format: CD	22	—	ARIA: 2× Platinum	Compilation of Kelly related material over the ten years since the earlier compilation. Also released as a 2× CD with Songs from the South, and released with a DVD Paul Kelly – The Video Collection 1985–2008, a collection of Kelly's videos made over the past 23 years together with several live performances.
Songs from the South: 1985–2019	Released: 15 November 2019; Label: Paul Kelly, Gawd Aggie Records, EMI (GAWD029); Format: CD, streaming, digital download, vinyl	1	—		
Time	Released: 20 May 2022; Label: Paul Kelly, Gawdaggie (GAWD036); Format: CD, streaming, digital download	95	—		
Rivers and Rain	Released: 29 July 2022; Label: Paul Kelly, Gawdaggie (GAWD037); Format: CD, streaming, digital download	—	—		
Drinking	Released: 30 September 2022; Label: Paul Kelly, Gawdaggie (GAWD038); Format: CD, streaming, digital download	—	—		
People	Released: 24 February 2023; Label: Paul Kelly, Gawdaggie (GAWD039); Format: CD, streaming, digital download	—	—		
Poetry	Released: 28 April 2023; Label: Paul Kelly, Gawdaggie (GAWD040); Format: CD, streaming, digital download	—	—		
"—" denotes releases that did not chart or were not released in that country.

=== Video albums ===
List of video albums, with selected chart positions, certifications and notes
Title	Album details	Peak chart positions	Certifications (sales thresholds)	Notes
Title	Album details	AUS	Certifications (sales thresholds)	Notes
Ways and Means	Released: 8 November 2004; Label: EMI Music; Format: DVD	—		Live performances by Paul Kelly and the Boon Companions in support of the album of the same name.
Live Apples	Released: 26 April 2008; Label: EMI Music; Format: DVD	10	ARIA: Gold	Subtitled Stolen Apples Performed Live in its Entirety Plus 16 More Songs from show on 20 September 2007 in Toowoomba, Queensland by Paul Kelly and the Boon Companions.
The Video Collection 1985–2008	Released: November 2008; Label: EMI Music; Format: DVD	24		A compilation of music videos spanning Kelly's career from 1985 to 2008.
Stories of Me	Released: 2012; Label: EMI Music; Format: DVD			
Goin' Your Way (by Neil Finn and Paul Kelly)	Released: November 2013; Label: EMI Australia; Format: DVD, BD	1	ARIA: Platinum	The DVD or BD version of the live album of the same name.
"—" denotes releases that did not chart or were not released in that country.

=== Extended plays ===
List of extended plays, with selected chart positions
Title	Album details	Peak chart positions
Title	Album details	AUS
The Dots (by The Dots)	Released: 1979; Label: Independent; Formats: 7" vinyl; Producer: The Dots	—
How to Make Gravy	Released: 4 November 1996 (Note: The four-track EP, How to Make Gravy (1996) (D1513) entered the ARIA Singles Chart in late December 2017 and peaked at No. 54. In December 2018 the American single version of "How to Make Gravy" (US-VG2-98-53333) re-entered the ARIA Top 100 at No. 37.); Label: Mushroom Records; Formats: CD; Producer: Kelly, Polinski	34
Roll on Summer	Released: 28 October 2000; Label: EMI; Formats: CD; Producer: Kelly, Peter Luscombe	40
Paul Kelly Exclusive CD	Released: 11 August 2001; Label: EMI / The Australian; Formats: CD; Producer: Kelly, Mark Wallis, Baldwin, Professor Ratbaggy	—
Won't You Come Around	Released: November 2003; Label: EMI; Formats: CD; Producer: Tchad Blake, Kelly	55
"—" denotes releases that did not chart or were not released in that country.

== Singles ==
List of singles, with selected chart positions, showing year released and album name
Title	Year	Peak chart positions			Certifications (sales thresholds)	Album
Title	Year	AUS	US Main	US Mod	Certifications (sales thresholds)	Album
"Recognition" (by The Dots) (Note: This was a single by The Dots, before the group transformed into Paul Kelly & The Dots. The song was later re-recorded by Paul Kelly & The Dots and included on their 1981 album, Talk.)	1979	—	—	—		The Dots (EP)
"Seeing Is Believing"	1980	—	—	—		non-album single
"Billy Baxter"	1980	38	—	—		Talk
"Low Down"	1981	—	—	—		Talk
"Clean This House"	1982	—	—	—		Manila
"Alive and Well"	1982	—	—	—		Manila
"Rocking Institution" (Note: This was a shared single with Jo Kennedy's "Body and Soul" on one side and Paul Kelly and the Dots "Rocking Institution" on the other side, both were used in the 1982 film Starstruck with Jo Kennedy in the starring role.)	1982	—	—	—		shared single release
"Love Is the Law" (Note: This was a single from the soundtrack of the 1983 Australian movie, Midnite Spares. This was the last recording by Paul Kelly and the Dots. It was later reworked by Kelly and included in his 2001 solo album, ...Nothing But a Dream.)	1983	—	—	—		Midnite Spares
"From St Kilda to Kings Cross"	1985	—	—	—	ARIA: Gold	Post
"Before Too Long"	1986	15	—	—	ARIA: 2× Platinum	Gossip
"Darling It Hurts"	1986	25	19	—	ARIA: Gold	Gossip
"Leaps and Bounds" / "Bradman"	1987	51	—	—	ARIA: Platinum	Gossip
"Look So Fine, Feel So Low"	1987	—	—	—		Gossip
"To Her Door"	1987	14	—	—	ARIA: 8× Platinum; RMNZ: Platinum	Under the Sun
"The Execution"	1987	—	—	—		Gossip
"Forty Miles to Saturday Night"	1988	85	—	—		Under the Sun
"Don't Stand So Close to the Window"	1988	—	—	—		Under the Sun
"Dumb Things"	1988	36	—	17	ARIA: 5× Platinum	Under the Sun
"Sweet Guy"	1989	53	—	—		So Much Water So Close to Home
"Careless"	1989	116	—	—	ARIA: Gold	So Much Water So Close to Home
"Most Wanted Man in the World"	1990	74	—	—		So Much Water So Close to Home
"Pouring Petrol on a Burning Man"	1990	109	—	—		single-only release
"Don't Start Me Talking"	1991	105	—	—		Comedy
"Keep It to Yourself"	1991	146	—	—		Comedy
"Wintercoat"	1991	170	—	—		Comedy
"Hey Boys" (by Paul Kelly and Mark Seymour) (Note: This was a duet with Mark Seymour (Hunters and Collectors) from the soundtrack of the 1992 Australian movie Garbo)	1992	71	—	—		Garbo
"When I First Met Your Ma"	1992	131	—	—		Hidden Things
"He Can't Decide" (by Paul Kelly, Vika Bull, Renée Geyer, Deborah Conway) (Note: This was a single from the soundtrack of the 1993 Australian television mini-series, Seven Deadly Sins. It was written by Kelly and Martin Armiger and performed by Paul Kelly, Vika Bull, Renée Geyer and Deborah Conway)	1993	112	—	—		Seven Deadly Sins
"Last Train" (by Paul Kelly and Christine Anu)	1993	93	—	—		single-only release
"Song from the Sixteenth Floor"	1994	87	—	—		Wanted Man
"Love Never Runs on Time"	1994	111	—	—		Wanted Man
"God's Hotel"	1994	149	—	—		Wanted Man
"Give in to My Love"	1995	129	—	—		Deeper Water
"Deeper Water" / "Behind the Bowler's Arm"	1995	147	—	—	ARIA: Platinum	Deeper Water
"How to Make Gravy"	1996	144	—	—		How to Make Gravy EP
"Tease Me" / "It Started with a Kiss"	1997	69	—	—		Songs from the South (bonus disc)
"Before Too Long"	1997	—	—	—		re-released as a single-only
"Nothing on My Mind"	1997	—	—	—		Words and Music
"Saturday Night and Sunday Morning"	1998	196	—	—		Words and Music
"I'll Be Your Lover"	1998	—	—	—		Words and Music
"Roll on Summer"	2000	40	—	—		Roll on Summer EP
"Somewhere in the City"	2001	106	—	—		...Nothing but a Dream
"Love Is the Law"	2001	194	—	—		...Nothing but a Dream
"If I Could Start Today Again"	2002	146	—	—		...Nothing but a Dream
"The Gift That Keeps on Giving"	2002	—	—	—		single-only release
"Just About to Break"	2002	189	—	—		...Nothing but a Dream
"Won't You Come Around"	2003	55	—	—		Won't You Come Around EP
"Beautiful Feeling"	2004	—	—	—		Ways & Means
"I Wish I Was a Train" (Paul Kelly and Troy Cassar-Daley)	2004	—	—	—		single-only release
"God Told Me To"	2007	—	—	—		Stolen Apples
"Right Outta My Head"	2007	—	—	—		Stolen Apples
"To Her Door" (live)	2008	—	—	—		Live Apples
"Still Here" (with Melinda Schneider)	2008	—	—	—		Be Yourself
"Whistling Cannonballs" (with Shane Nicholson)	2011	—	—	—		Bad Machines (Shane Nicholson album)
"New Found Year"	2012	—	—	—		Spring and Fall
"Firewood and Candles"	2017	—	—	—	ARIA: Gold	Life Is Fine
"With the One I Love"	2018	—	—	—		Nature
"A Bastard Like Me"	2018	—	—	—		Nature
"And Death Shall Have No Dominion"	2018	—	—	—		Nature
"How to Make Gravy"	2018	37	—	—	ARIA: 4× Platinum; RMNZ: Gold	How to Make Gravy
"Every Day My Mother's Voice" (with Dan Sultan)	2019	—	—	—		Songs from the South: 1985–2019
"Rally Round the Drum" (with Archie Roach)	2019	—	—	—		Tell Me Why (Archie Roach album)
"When We're Both Old & Mad" (with Kasey Chambers)	2019	—	—	—		Songs from the South: 1985–2019
"Sleep, Australia, Sleep"	2020	— (Note: "Sleep, Australia, Sleep" did not enter the ARIA Top 50 Singles Chart, but peaked at number 36 on the ARIA Digital Track Chart.)	—	—		non-album singles
"Hummin' to Myself"	2020	—	—	—		non-album singles
"If I Could Start Today Again" (with Paul Grabowsky)	2020	—	—	—		Please Leave Your Light On
"Please Leave Your Light On" (with Paul Grabowsky)	2020	—	—	—		Please Leave Your Light On
"Young Lovers" (with Paul Grabowsky)	2020	—	—	—		Please Leave Your Light On
"You Broke a Beautiful Thing" (with Paul Grabowsky)	2020	—	—	—		non-album single
"Little Things" (Ziggy Ramo featuring Paul Kelly)	2021	—	—	—		Human?
"Every Step of the Way"	2021	—	—	—		non-album single
"Christmas"	2021	—	—	—		Paul Kelly's Christmas Train
"Northern Rivers"	2022	—	—	—		Rivers and Rains
"Alone with You"	2023	—	—	—		Mushroom: Fifty Years of Making Noise (Reimagined)
"Khawaja"	2023	—	—	—		non-album singles
"If Not Now"	2023	—	—	—		non-album singles
"Sing You Over" (Emma Donovan featuring Paul Kelly)	2024	—	—	—		Til My Song Is Done
"Taught by Experts"	2024	—	—	—		Fever Longing Still
"Going to the River with Dad"	2024	—	—	—		Fever Longing Still
"Houndstooth Dress"	2024	—	—	—		Fever Longing Still
"All Those Smiling Faces"	2024	—	—	—		Fever Longing Still
"Cool Hand Lukin"	2025	—	—	—		non-album single
"Fine" (with Megan Washington)	2025	—	—	—		Gem
"Rita Wrote a Letter"	2025	—	—	—		Seventy
"The Body Keeps the Score"	2025	—	—	—		Seventy
"Tell Us a Story"	2025	—	—	—		Seventy
"Did it Again" (Like a Version)	2025	—	—	—		
"Stardust"	2026	—	—	—		Seventy (Deluxe Edition)
"By the River" (with Fanny Lumsden)	2026	—	—	—		Traditions (Fanny Lumsden album)
"Broken Toys"	2026	—	—	—		Forever Young by War Child Australia
"—" denotes releases that did not chart or were not released in that country.

=== Other certified songs ===
List of other certified songs
Title	Year	Peak chart positions	Certifications	Album
Title	Year	AUS	Certifications	Album
"From Little Things Big Things Grow"	1991	—	ARIA: Platinum	Comedy
"Four Seasons in One Day" (with Angus Stone)	2010	—	ARIA: Platinum	He Will Have His Way

== Music videos ==
List of music videos, showing year released and director
Title	Year	Director(s)
"Alive and Well"	1982	Jack Egan
"From St Kilda to Kings Cross"	1985	Ian Pringle
"Before Too Long"	1986	John Witteron
"Darling It Hurts"	1986	Claudia Castle
"Leaps and Bounds"	1987	Mick Bell
"Bradman"	1987	Jack Egan
"To Her Door"	1987	Claudia Castle
"Forty Miles to Saturday Night"	1988	Sue Davis
"Dumb Things"	1989	Larry Williams
"Sweet Guy"	1989	Claudia Castle
"Careless"	1989	Kimble Rendall
"Don't Start Me Talking"	1991	John Reddon, John Witteron
"Keep It to Yourself"	1991	Rob Wellington
"When I First Met Your Ma"	1992	Paul Elliot
"Last Train" (with Christine Anu)	1993	Paul Elliot, Sally Bongers
"Love Never Runs on Time"	1994	Ronny Reinhard
"Songs from the Sixteenth Floor"	1994	Tony Mahony
"Tease Me"	1997	Robbie Douglas Taylor
"It Started With a Kiss"	1997	Robbie Douglas Taylor
"Nothing on My Mind"	1998	Tony Mahony
"I'll Be Your Lover"	1998	Tony Mahony
"Saturday Night and Sunday Morning"	1998	Tony Mahony
"Our Sunshine"	1999	Tony Mahony
"You Can't Take It with You"	1999	Tony Mahony
"Can't Fake It"	1999	Tony Mahony
"You're so Fine"	2000	Tony Mahony
"Somewhere in the City"	2001	Tony Mahony
"Love Is the Law"	2001	Tony Mahony
"If I Could Start Today Again"	2002	Tony Mahony
"Just about to Break"	2002	Ben Saunders
"Sure Got Me"	2003	Tony Mahony
"Wish I Was a Train" (with Troy Cassar-Daly)	2003	Tony Mahony
"Won't You Come Around"	2004	Ben Saunders
"The Mess We're In" (with Katy Steele) (Note: Duet with Katy Steele live on RocKwiz, 2005, Episode 5.)	2005	John Lang
"You're Learning" (with Kasey Chambers, Stormwater Boys) (Note: Duet with Kasey Chambers backed by the Stormwater Boys, recorded on 15 July 2005 and released as Live at the Enmore Theatre, a limited edition DVD, with re-issue of Foggy Highway on 13 January 2006.)	2005	Rod McCormack, Paul Kelly
"They Thought I Was Asleep" (with the Stormwater Boys) (Note: Performed with the Stormwater Boys, recorded on 15 July 2005 and released as Live at the Enmore Theatre, a limited edition DVD, with re-issue of Foggy Highway on 13 January 2006.)	2005	Rod McCormack, Paul Kelly
"How to Make Gravy" (with the Stormwater Boys)	2005	Rod McCormack, Paul Kelly
"Meet Me in the Middle of the Air" (with the Stormwater Boys)	2005	Rod McCormack, Paul Kelly
"Shane Warne" (Note: Released on YouTube only)	2007	Andy Doherty
"God Told Me To"	2007	Natasha Pinkus
"To Her Door" (live)	2008	Paul Drane
"Stolen Apples Are the Sweetest"	2008	Paul Drane
"Rally Round the Drum"	2019	Mushroom Creative House
"When We're Both Old & Mad"	2019	Siân Darling
"Sleep, Australia, Sleep"	2020	Siân Darling
"Hummin' to Myself"	2020	Andy Doherty
"If I Could Start Today Again" (with Paul Grabowsky)	2020	
"Christmas"	2021	

== Soundtracks ==
List of soundtrack albums, with year of release and notes
Title	Year	Notes
Funerals and Circuses	1992	Musical score composed by Paul Kelly, for the play of the same name, written by Roger Bennett.
Seven Deadly Sins: Music from the ABC TV Series	1993	Tracks co-composed and performed by Kelly and others, for the Australian Broadcasting Corporation TV miniseries, Seven Deadly Sins.
Everynight... Everynight	1994	Co-composed by Kelly and Shane O'Mara, both members of Paul Kelly Band. for the score of the feature film of the same name.
The Big House	2000	Score composed by Kelly for the short film of the same name, directed by Rachel Ward.
One Night the Moon: Original Soundtrack	2001	Co-composed by Kelly, Kev Carmody, Maireed Hannan; for score and soundtrack of the short film of the same name, which is directed by Rachel Perkins. Kelly also starred in a lead role as Jim; his then-real life wife, Kaarin Fairfax, appeared as Jim's wife, Rose; and their daughter, Memphis Kelly, portrayed the couple's daughter, Emily.
Music for the Feature Film Lantana	2001	Co-composed by Kelly, Stephen Hadley, Bruce Haymes and Peter Luscombe (also members of Professor Ratbaggy) and Shane O'Mara, who are all members of Paul Kelly Band. Used for the score and soundtrack for the feature film, Lantana.
Silent Partner	2001	Co-composed by Kelly, Gerry Hale (of the band, Uncle Bill); used for the score of the feature film of the same name.
Fireflies: Songs of Paul Kelly	2004	Co-composed by Kelly and Stephen Rae, Kelly also provided the theme song, "Beautiful Feeling", from his solo album, Ways & Means. Used on the score and soundtrack for the TV series, Fireflies. The CD includes tracks performed by Kelly, Paul Kelly and the Boon Companions, Professor Ratbaggy, Paul Kelly with Uncle Bill, and Boon Companions featuring Sian Prior.
Tom White	2004	Co-composed by Paul Kelly and the Boon Companions, for the score of the feature film of the same name.
Jindabyne	2006	Co-composed by Kelly and Dan Luscombe, both members of Stardust Five and of Paul Kelly Band, for the feature film of the same name.

== Other appearances ==
List of other appearances, showing year released and album name
Title	Year	Album
"Hand Me Down", "Billy Baxter" (by Paul Kelly with Jo Jo Zep & the Falcons)	1982	Mushroom Evolution Concert
"Only the Lonely Heart", "I Need Something Inside Me" (by Paul Kelly and the Dots)	1982	Rocking Australia Live
"Special Treatment" (live)	1989	Building Bridges – Australia Has a Black History
"Farewell Don + Edward Kelly"	1993	Going Home – Australian Artists, Australian Songs
"When I First Met Your Ma" (acoustic version)	1993	Triple M Cordless
"Ode to a Nightingale"	1996	Native Tongue – Loudspeaker
"Madeleine"	1996	Lullaby and Goodnight
"Thanks a Lot" (Paul Kelly & Uncle Bill)	1997	Where Joy Kills Sorrow
"Sunlander" (Paul Kelly & Uncle Bill)	1998	Not So Dusty – A Tribute to Slim Dusty
"Leaps and Bounds", "Wide Open Road" (by Paul Kelly and Chris Bailey), "To Her Door"	1998	Mushroom 25 Live
"Tease Me"	1999	Triple J - Lust for Live: Live at the Wireless 4
"Blues for Skip"	1999	Liberdade: Viva East Timor
"Little Kings"	1999	Music Live from the Panel
"To Her Door"	2000	Cold: Live at the Chapel
"To Her Door", "Before Too Long"	2000	Rock the Millennium: A Celebration of Australian Music
"Little Red Corvette"	2001	The Andrew Denton Breakfast Show – Musical Challenge Vol. 2
"Somewhere in the City"	2001	Rove [Live] – ... Some Music
"Christmas Must Be Tonight"	2001	The Spirit of Christmas 2001
"Khe Sanh"	2007	Standing on the Outside: The Songs of Cold Chisel
"Droving Woman" (by Paul Kelly, Glenn Richards, Missy Higgins)	2007	Cannot Buy My Soul: The Songs of Kev Carmody
"Still Here" (with Melinda Schneider)	2008	Be Yourself
"Every Day My Mother's Voice" (featuring Jess Hitchcock)	2020	Music from the Home Front

== See also ==
- List of awards and nominations received by Paul Kelly – full listing of all awards won by the artist.
