= List of awards and nominations received by Paul Kelly =

Paul Kelly awards and nominations
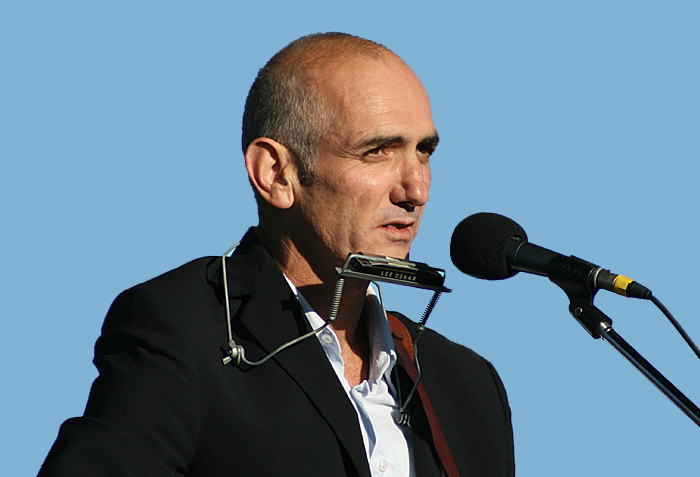
- Kelly in November 2007
Awards and nominations
Award	Wins	Nominations
ARIA Awards	14	54
APRA Awards	2	4
APRA-AGSC Awards Screen Music Awards	1	4
CMAA Awards Country Music Awards	6	12
Mo Awards Entertainment industry awards	4	4
Victorian Country Music Awards	3	3

Totals (Note: Certain award groups do not simply award one winner. They acknowledge several different recipients, have runners-up, and have third place. Since this is a specific recognition and is different from losing an award, runner-up mentions are considered wins in this award tally. For simplification and to avoid errors, each award in this list has been presumed to have had a prior nomination.)
- Wins: 30
- Nominations: 79

Paul Kelly is an Australian rock/folk musician, singer-songwriter who started his professional career in 1974 and released his first recording in 1979. Kelly, in various guises, has released eighteen studio albums, Talk (1981), Manila (1982), Post (1985), Gossip (1986), Under The Sun (1987), So Much Water So Close To Home (1989), Comedy (1991), Hidden Things (1992), Wanted Man (1994), Deeper Water (1995), Words and Music (1998), Smoke (1999), Professor Ratbaggy (1999), Nothing But A Dream (2001), Ways & Means (2004), Foggy Highway (2005), Stardust Five (2006), and Stolen Apples (2007).

Kelly has won and been nominated for numerous music awards. They include nine Australian Recording Industry Association (ARIA) Awards and three Australasian Performing Right Association (APRA) Awards/Australian Guild of Screen Composers (AGSC) Awards. APRA also named "To Her Door", solely written by Kelly, and "Treaty", written by Kelly and members of Indigenous Australian band Yothu Yindi, in the Top 30 best Australian songs of all time in 2001. Kelly was inducted into the ARIA Hall of Fame in 1997 alongside the Bee Gees and Graeme Bell. This induction recognised his achievement of a "significant body of recorded work" and that he "has had a cultural impact within Australia". Kelly has also won awards in the country music field with six from the Country Music Association of Australia (CMAA) and three more from the Victorian Country Music Awards. As a live performer, Kelly won four Australian entertainment industry awards or Mo Awards.

In 2019, at the Screen Music Awards, Paul Kelly won Best Original Song Composed for the Screen for "Every Day My Mother's Voice" with Dan Sultan.

== History ==
Paul Kelly has performed in many guises including: as a solo act; as the leader of various bands – the Paul Kelly Band, Paul Kelly and the Dots, Paul Kelly and the Coloured Girls, Paul Kelly and the Messengers, Paul Kelly and the Boon Companions, and Paul Kelly and the Stormwater Boys; and as a member of the related projects Professor Ratbaggy and Stardust Five. He has also performed or composed award-winning or nominated songs with other artists including Christine Anu, Uncle Bill, Kev Carmody and Archie Roach. The category for which he has received most nominations is Best Male Artist, or its equivalent as Male Vocalist of the Year (Country Music) or Male Rock Performer, with a total of 14 nominations resulting in four wins.

== Australian of the Year Awards ==
The Australian of the Year Awards were established in 1960, in celebration Australia Day (26 January), to give proper recognition to a leading citizen, whose contribution to the nation's culture, economy, sciences or arts was particularly outstanding. The recipient is determined by the National Australia Day Council from the State winners. Kelly was a Victorian State Finalist for the 2012 Australian of the Year Award.

Year	Nominee / work	Award	Result
2012	Paul Kelly	Australian of the Year (Victorian winner)	State Finalist

== Australian Record Industry Association (ARIA) Awards ==
These awards have been presented by the ARIA since 1987. Paul Kelly has won 17 ARIA Awards from at least 61 nominations, including his first win in 1988 for the 'Best Video' award for "To Her Door", which was written by Kelly and performed by Paul Kelly and the Coloured Girls. His success has been across categories, being successful five times in 'Best Adult Contemporary Album', three times in the 'Best Male Artist' and three times in the 'Best Original Soundtrack' categories. Kelly has been nominated for 'Best Male Artist' eighteen times including a run of eight years in a row 1995 to 2002 winning in 1997, 1998 and 2017. Kelly was also inducted into the ARIA Hall of Fame in 1997 alongside Bee Gees and Graeme Bell. In 2019 he became the first artist to be nominated in three genre categories for three different releases – he won two of those awards. Further genre-hopping occurred in 2020 with a win for Best Jazz Album.

Year	Nominee / work	Award	Result
1987	Gossip	Best Male Artist	Nominated
1987	Gossip	Album of the Year	Nominated
1987	"Before Too Long"	Single of the Year	Nominated
1987	"Before Too Long"	Song of the Year	Nominated
1987	Gossip – Alan Thorne	Producer of the Year	Nominated
1988	"To Her Door" (Note: Video for "To Her Door" was directed by Claudia Castle.)	Best Video	Won
1989	"Forty Miles to Saturday Night"	Best Male Artist	Nominated
1990	So Much Water So Close To Home	Album of the Year	Nominated
1990	So Much Water So Close To Home	Best Male Artist	Nominated
1990	So Much Water So Close To Home	Best Adult Contemporary Album	Nominated
1990	"Careless"	Song of the Year	Nominated
1993	"Paul Kelly Live"	Best Male Artist	Nominated
1994	"Last Train" (Note: The nomination was shared with fellow composer / performer Christine Anu, Anu and Kelly performed "Last Train" as a duet, the video was directed by Paul Elliot and Sally Bongers, Anu was also nominated as 'Best Breakthrough Artist' for the song.)	Best Video	Nominated
1994	"Last Train" – Angelique Cooper (Note: The nomination was for production work by Angelique Cooper including on "Last Train" by Anu and Kelly; Neil Murray's "Holy Road" (Remix); and Yothu Yindi's "World Turning" (Remix))	Producer of the Year	Nominated
1995	Wanted Man	Best Male Artist	Nominated
1996	Deeper Water	Best Male Artist	Nominated
1997	How to Make Gravy	Best Male Artist	Won
1997	Songs from the South	Best Cover Art	Nominated
1997	"Tease Me – Tease Me" (Note: Nomination to Chris Dickie for engineering Kelly's "Tease Me – Tease Me", and Black Sorrows' songs "Chained to the Wheel", "Chosen Ones" and "New Craze".)	Engineer of the Year	Nominated
1997	"How to Make Gravy"	Song of the Year	Nominated
1997	Paul Kelly	ARIA Hall of Fame	Inducted
1998	Words and Music	Best Male Artist	Won
1999	"I'll Be Your Lover"	Best Male Artist	Nominated
2000	Smoke	Best Male Artist	Nominated
2001	Roll on Summer	Best Male Artist	Nominated
2002	Nothing but a Dream	Best Male Artist	Nominated
2002	Lantana (Note: The nominations / award are shared with fellow composers / performers, Stephen Hadley, Bruce Haymes, Peter Luscombe and Shane O'Mara; who were also members of Paul Kelly Band and of Professor Ratbaggy.)	Best Original Soundtrack Album	Won
2002	Sensual Being (Note: Sensual Being was produced for Archie Roach, Kelly also produced Roach's 1990 album Charcoal Lane.)	Producer of the Year	Nominated
2002	Nothing but a Dream	Best Adult Contemporary Album	Won
2004	Ways & Means	Best Adult Contemporary Album	Won
2005	Foggy Highway	Best Male Artist	Nominated
2005	Foggy Highway	Best Country Album	Nominated
2006	Jindabyne (Note: The nomination is shared with fellow composer / performer, Dan Luscombe, also a member of Paul Kelly and the Boon Companions and of Stardust Five.)	Best Original Soundtrack / Cast / Show Album	Won
2007	Stolen Apples	Best Male Artist	Nominated
2007	Stolen Apples	Best Adult Contemporary Album	Nominated
2008	"To Her Door (Live)"	Best Male Artist	Nominated
2008	Live Apples	Best Music DVD	Nominated
2013	Spring and Fall	Best Male Artist	Nominated
2013	Conversations with Ghosts (Note: The nominations / award are shared with fellow composers / performers, James Ledger, Genevieve Lacey & ANAM Musicians.)	Best Original Soundtrack / Cast / Show Album	Won
2013	Paul Kelly and Neil Finn – Australian Tour: February – March 2013	Best Australian Live Act	Nominated
2014	Paul Kelly and Neil Finn – Goin' Your Way	Best Adult Contemporary Album	Won
2015	The Merri Soul Sessions	Best Independent Release	Nominated
2015	The Merri Soul Sessions	Best Adult Contemporary Album	Nominated
2015	The Merri Soul Sessions Tour	Best Australian Live Act	Nominated
2016	Seven Sonnets & a Song	Best Adult Contemporary Album	Nominated
2017	Life Is Fine	Album of the Year	Nominated
2017	Life Is Fine	Best Male Artist	Won
2017	Life Is Fine	Best Adult Contemporary Album	Won
2017	Death's Dateless Night – Paul Kelly and Charlie Owen	Best Blues & Roots Album	Nominated
2017	Life Is Fine – Steven Schram & Paul Kelly	Producer of the Year	Nominated
2017	Life Is Fine – Steven Schram	Engineer of the Year	Won
2017	Life Is Fine – Peter Salmon-Lomas	Best Cover Art	Won
2018	Life Is Fine Tour 2017	Best Australian Live Act	Nominated
2019	Thirteen Ways to Look at Birds – Paul Kelly and James Ledger	Best Classical Album	Won
2019	Nature – Paul Kelly and Steven Schram	Producer of the Year	Nominated
2019	Nature – Lucy Dyson	Best Cover Art	Nominated
2019	Nature	Best Male Artist	Nominated
2019	Nature	Best Adult Contemporary Album	Won
2019	Live at Sydney Opera House	Best Blues & Roots Album	Nominated
2020	Please Leave Your Light On – Paul Kelly and Paul Grabowsky	Best Jazz Album	Won
2020	Paul Kelly – Making Gravy 2019	Best Australian Live Act	Nominated
2025	Fever Longing Still	Best Solo Artist	Nominated
2025	Fever Longing Still	Best Adult Contemporary Album	Nominated
2026	Seventy	Best Adult Contemporary Album	Nominated
2026	Australian Tour 2025	Best Australian Live Act	Nominated

== Australasian Performing Right Association (APRA) Awards ==
These awards were established by APRA in 1982 to honour the achievements of songwriters and music composers, and to recognise their songwriting skills, sales and airplay performance, by its members annually. Paul Kelly has won two APRA Awards out of four nominations. The songs "To Her Door" and "Treaty", written or co-written by Kelly, were also voted in the Top 30 Best Australian songs of all time in 2001 by a panel of 100 music industry personalities.

At the 2011 APRA Music Awards Kelly was honoured with the Ted Albert Award for Outstanding Services to Australian Music.

Year	Nominee / work	Award	Result
1991	"Treaty" (Note: The award was shared with fellow songwriters of "Treaty", members of Yothu Yindi: Stuart Kellaway, Witiyana Marika, Milkayggu Mununggurr, Cal Williams, Gurrumul Yunupingu and Mandawuy Yunupingu; who performed the song on their 1991 album Tribal Voice and released it as a single.)	Song of the Year	Won
1998	"How to Make Gravy"	Song of the Year	Nominated
1999	Paul Kelly	Songwriter of the Year	Won
2001	"To Her Door"	Best Australian songs	Top 30
2001	"Treaty"	Best Australian songs	Top 30
2004	"I Wish I was a Train" (Note: The nomination was shared with fellow songwriter of "I Wish I was a Train", Troy Cassar-Daley, they also performed the song as a duet.)	Most Performed Country Work	Nominated
2011	Paul Kelly	Ted Albert Award for Outstanding Services to Australian Music	awarded
2013	Conversations with Ghosts (Note: The nomination was shared with fellow songwriters of Conversations with Ghosts, James Ledger, Dan Kelly, Emily Dickinson, Norman MacCaig, Les Murray, Kenneth Slessor, Lord Alfred Tennyson, Judith Wright, W.B. Yeats. It was performed as an ensemble by Paul Kelly, James Ledger, Genevieve Lacey and musicians from Australian National Academy of Music.)	Work of the Year – Vocal or Choral	Nominated
2016	"Freedom Ride" (with Troy Cassar Daley)	Song of the Year	Shortlisted
2018	"Firewood and Candles"	Song of the Year	Won
2019	"With the One I Love"	Song of the Year	Nominated
2019	"Every Day My Mother's Voice" for The Final Quarter	Best Original Song Composed for the Screen	Won
2020	"Every Day My Mother's Voice" (with Dan Sultan)	Song of the Year	Shortlisted
2021	"When We're Both Old and Mad" (Paul Kelly & Kasey Chambers)	Song of the Year	Shortlisted
2024	"If Not Now"	Song of the Year	Nominated
2026	"Rita Wrote a Letter" (Paul Kelly / Dan Kelly)	Song of the Year	Nominated

== APRA-AGSC Screen Music Awards ==
These awards are presented annually by APRA in conjunction with Australian Guild of Screen Composers (AGSC) for television and films scores and soundtracks. Paul Kelly has won one award from four nominations.

Year	Nominee / work	Award	Result
2002	Lantana	Best Feature Film Score	Nominated
2002	Lantana	Best Soundtrack Album	Nominated
2002	One Night the Moon (Note: The award was shared with fellow composers / performers, Mairead Hannan, Kev Carmody, John Romeril, Deirdre Hannan, Alice Garner.)	Best Soundtrack Album	Won
2007	Jindabyne	Best Soundtrack Album	Nominated

== Countdown Australian Music Awards ==
Countdown was an Australian pop music TV series on national broadcaster ABC-TV from 1974 to 1987, it presented music awards from 1979 to 1987, initially in conjunction with magazine TV Week. The TV Week / Countdown Awards were a combination of popular-voted and peer-voted awards.

Year	Nominee / work	Award	Result
1986	Gossip	Best Album	Nominated
1986	"Before Too Long"	Best Male Performance in a Video	Nominated
1986	"Before Too Long"	Best Single	Nominated
1986	himself	Best Songwriter	Nominated

== Country Music Association of Australia (CMAA) Awards ==
These annual awards have been presented by CMAA since 1973, to "encourage, promote and recognise excellence in Australian country music recording." Paul Kelly has won six Country Music Awards from twelve nominations.

Year	Nominee / work	Award	Result
1994	"From Little Things Big Things Grow" (Note: The award was shared with fellow composer / performer Kev Carmody, Carmody, Kelly and numerous other musicians performed "From Little Things Big Things Grow" on Carmody's 1993 album Bloodlines and it was also released as a single. Paul Kelly and the Messengers had recorded it earlier on their 1991 album Comedy.)	Heritage Award	Won
1999	"Until Death Do Them Part" (Note: The nomination / awards were shared with fellow performers, members of Uncle Bill: Adam Gare, Gerry Hale, Peter Somerville and Stuart Speed.)	Song of the Year	Nominated
2003	"Wish I Was a Train"	Vocal Collaboration of the Year	Won
2006	"You're Learning" (Note: The nominations / award are shared by Paul Kelly and the Stormwater Boys, members are: Kelly, Mick Albeck, James Gillard, Rod McCormack, Ian Simpson and Trev Warner. "You're Learning", "Song of the Old Rake" and "Rally Around the Drum" are songs on their 2005 album Foggy Highway. The video for "Song of the Old Rake" was directed by Nice Trees.)	Vocal Collaboration of the Year	Nominated
2006	"Lonesome but Free" (Note: The award was shared with co-writer and performer Troy Cassar-Daley, who won three other CMAA awards in 2006.)	APRA Song of the Year	Won
2006	"Song of the Old Rake"	APRA Song of the Year	Nominated
2006	"Song of the Old Rake"	Male Vocalist of the Year	Nominated
2006	"Song of the Old Rake"	Video Clip of the Year	Won
2006	Foggy Highway	Album of the Year	Nominated
2006	Foggy Highway	Top Selling Album of the Year	Nominated
2006	"Rally Around the Drum"	Heritage Song of the Year	Won
2009	"Still Here" (Note: The award was shared with Melinda Schneider, who performed "Still Here" as a duet with Kelly, she was co-writer of "Still Here" with Jay Knowles.)	Vocal Collaboration of the Year	Won
2018	"Hey" (with Kasey Chambers)	Vocal Collaboration of the Year	Nominated

== Environmental Music Prize ==
The Environmental Music Prize is a quest to find a theme song to inspire action on climate and conservation. It commenced in 2022.

Year	Nominee / work	Award	Result	Ref.
2022	"Sleep Australia Sleep"	Environmental Music Prize	Nominated	

== Australian Entertainment Awards (Mo Awards) ==
The Mo Awards are the annual Australian entertainment industry awards, and recognise achievements by performers in live entertainment in Australia since 1975. The award categories are reviewed and in 2008 were: Musical Theatre, Opera, Classical, Comedy, Country and Variety. In 1989 and 1990, they included a Rock category, Paul Kelly won four Mo Awards, twice as Male Rock Performer and twice as leader of Paul Kelly and the Messengers to win the Rock Group award.

Year	Nominee / work	Award	Result
1989	Paul Kelly	Male Rock Performer	Won
1989	Paul Kelly and the Messengers	Rock Group	Won
1990	Paul Kelly	Male Rock Performer	Won
1990	Paul Kelly and the Messengers	Rock Group	Won

== Helpmann Awards ==
The Helpmann Awards recognise achievements in live performance in Australia. In 2015, Kelly received the JC Williamson Award, the LPA's highest honour, for their life's work in live performance

Year	Nominee / work	Award	Result
2009	More Songs from the South	Best Australian Contemporary Concert	Nominated
2013	Neil Finn & Paul Kelly	Best Australian Contemporary Concert	Won
2015	Himself	JC Williamson Award	awarded
2017	Ancient Rain (with Camille O'Sullivan and Feargal Murray)	Best Original Score	Nominated
2019	Making Gravy 2018	Best Australian Contemporary Concert	Nominated

== J Awards ==
The J Awards are an annual series of Australian music awards that were established by the Australian Broadcasting Corporation's youth-focused radio station Triple J. They commenced in 2005.

Year	Nominee / work	Award	Result	Ref.
2021	"Little Things" (with Ziggy Ramo) (directed by Ziggy Ramo)	Australian Video of the Year	Nominated	
2025	Paul Kelly	Double J Artist of the Year	Nominated	

== Music Victoria Awards ==
The Music Victoria Awards, are an annual awards night celebrating Victorian music. The commenced in 2005. (awards 2005-2012 are unknown).

Year	Nominee / work	Award	Result
2010	himself	Hall of Fame	inductee
2013	Spring and Fall	Best Album	Won
2013	himself	Best Male Act	Won
2015	The Merri Soul Sessions	Best Soul, Funk, R'n'B and Gospel Album	Nominated
2017	himself	Best Male Act	Won
2019	himself	Best Male Musician	Won

== Order of Australia ==
The Order of Australia was established on 14 February 1975 to honour Australian citizens and other persons for achievement or meritorious service.

Year	Nominee / work	Award	Result
2017	Paul Maurice Kelly	Officer of the Order of Australia	Honoured

== South Australian Music Awards ==
Year	Nominee / work	Award	Result
2023	Paul Kelly	Hall of Fame	inducted

== Victorian Country Music Awards ==
These annual awards are presented by the Victorian Country Music Association. Paul Kelly won three awards for the 2000 album Smoke or one of its tracks "Until Death Do Them Part", all recorded by Paul Kelly with Uncle Bill.

Year	Nominee / work	Award	Result
2000	"Until Death Do Them Part"	Victorian Group	Won
2000	"Until Death Do Them Part"	Open Group	Won
2000	Smoke	Victorian Album of the Year	Won

== Other recognition ==
In August 2022, the City of Adelaide renamed a laneway in the city centre off Flinders Street Paul Kelly Lane. Previously named Pilgrim Lane after the adjacent Pilgrim Uniting Church, the lane is now called Paul Kelly Lane. It is the fourth such renaming after musicians associated with the city, the others being Sia Furler, No Fixed Address, and Cold Chisel.

== See also ==
- Paul Kelly discography – includes sales certifications
