= Songs from the South: 1985–2019 =

Greatest hits album by Paul Kelly
- Released: 15 November 2019
- Recorded: 1985–2019
- Length: 2:38:00
- Label: Gawd Aggie; EMI

Paul Kelly chronology
Thirteen Ways to Look at Birds (2019)	Songs from the South: 1985–2019 (2019)	Forty Days (2020)

Songs from the South: 1985–2019 is a career-spanning greatest hits album by Australian singer-songwriter Paul Kelly. It was released on 15 November 2019 through Gawd Aggie and EMI Music Australia, and debuted atop the Australian albums chart.

== Background and release ==
In 1997, Paul Kelly released his first compilation Songs from the South. A second volume, Songs from the South Volume 2 was released in 2008. Eleven years later, the collection is getting a third upgrade. The 2019 album includes the brand new song "When We're Both Old & Mad" with Kasey Chambers.

== Track listing ==
Disc one
No.	Title	Writer(s)	Length
1.	"From St Kilda to Kings Cross" (from Post, 1985)	Paul Kelly	2:55
2.	"Before Too Long" (with the Coloured Girls; from Gossip, 1986)	Kelly	3:23
3.	"Leaps and Bounds" (with the Coloured Girls; from Gossip)	Kelly; Chris Langman	3:24
4.	"Darling It Hurts" (with the Coloured Girls; from Gossip)	Kelly; Steve Connolly	3:19
5.	"Look So Fine, Feel So Low" (with the Coloured Girls; from Gossip; original from Post)	Kelly; Maurice Frawley	3:21
6.	"To Her Door" (with the Coloured Girls; from Under the Sun, 1987)	Kelly	3:18
7.	"Dumb Things" (with the Coloured Girls; from Under the Sun)	Kelly	2:31
8.	"Careless" (with the Messengers; from So Much Water So Close to Home, 1989)	Kelly	2:57
9.	"Sweet Guy" (with the Messengers; from So Much Water So Close to Home)	Kelly	3:37
10.	"Everything's Turning to White" (live version (recorded 1996); original with the Messengers from So Much Water So Close to Home)	Kelly	4:49
11.	"From Little Things Big Things Grow" (with the Messengers; from Comedy, 1991)	Kelly; Kev Carmody	6:54
12.	"Winter Coat" (with the Messengers; from Comedy)	Kelly	3:38
13.	"Bradman" (with the Coloured Girls; single release, 1987)	Kelly	7:31
14.	"When I First Met Your Ma" (live version from The A to Z Recordings, 2010; original with the Messengers from Hidden Things, 1992)	Kelly	4:42
15.	"Love Never Runs on Time" (from Wanted Man, 1994)	Kelly	2:58
16.	"Song from the Sixteenth Floor" (from Wanted Man)	Kelly; John Clifforth	3:58
17.	"Deeper Water" (from Deeper Water, 1995)	Kelly; Randy Jacobs	4:32
18.	"How to Make Gravy" (from How to Make Gravy, 1996)	Kelly	4:28
19.	"Nothing on My Mind" (from Words and Music, 1998)	Kelly; Peter Luscombe; Steve Hadley	4:55
20.	"Love Letter" (performed by Professor Ratbaggy; from Professor Ratbaggy, 1999)	Kelly	3:31

Disc two
No.	Title	Writer(s)	Length
1.	"Our Sunshine" (with Uncle Bill; from Smoke, 1999)	Paul Kelly; Mick Thomas	4:23
2.	"Every Fucking City" (live version from The A to Z Recordings, 2010; original from Roll on Summer, 2000)	Kelly	3:36
3.	"If I Could Start Today Again" (from ...Nothing but a Dream, 2001)	Kelly	2:50
4.	"Midnight Rain" (from ...Nothing but a Dream)	Kelly; Wendy Matthews	4:54
5.	"The Oldest Story in the Book" (from Ways & Means, 2004)	Kelly; Dan Luscombe	4:29
6.	"Your Lovin' Is on My Mind" (from Ways & Means)	Kelly	3:37
7.	"They Thought I Was Asleep" (with the Stormwater Boys; from Foggy Highway, 2005)	Kelly	3:35
8.	"Meet Me in the Middle of the Air" (with the Stormwater Boys; from Foggy Highway, 2005)	Kelly	2:38
9.	"You're 39, You're Beautiful and You're Mine" (from Stolen Apples, 2007)	Kelly	3:35
10.	"God Told Me To" (from Stolen Apples)	Kelly	3:42
11.	"Time and Tide" (from Spring and Fall, 2012)	Kelly; Alan Pigram	3:19
12.	"I'm on Your Side" (from Spring and Fall)	Paul Kelly; Dan Kelly	3:18
13.	"Thank You" (from The Merri Soul Sessions, 2014)	Kelly	2:59
14.	"Sonnet 18" (from Seven Sonnets & a Song, 2016)	Kelly; William Shakespeare	3:20
15.	"Rising Moon" (from Life Is Fine, 2017)	Kelly; Billy Miller	3:51
16.	"Firewood and Candles" (from Life Is Fine)	Kelly; Miller	2:56
17.	"Finally Something Good" (from Life Is Fine)	Kelly	3:24
18.	"Letter in the Rain" (from Life Is Fine)	Kelly	3:01
19.	"With the One I Love" (from Nature, 2018)	Kelly	2:30
20.	"A Bastard Like Me (For Charlie Perkins)" (from Nature)	Kelly	2:37
21.	"And Death Shall Have No Dominion" (from Nature)	Kelly; Dylan Thomas	2:28
22.	"Every Day My Mother's Voice" (with Dan Sultan; single release, 2019)	Kelly	4:04
23.	"When We're Both Old & Mad" (with Kasey Chambers; previously unreleased)	Kelly	2:22

== Charts ==
=== Weekly charts ===
Chart (2019)	Peak position
Australian Albums (ARIA)	1

=== Year-end charts ===
Chart (2019)	Position
Australian Albums (ARIA)	57
Chart (2020)	Position
Australian Albums (ARIA)	58

== See also ==
- List of number-one albums of 2019 (Australia)
