= Live at the Sydney Opera House (Paul Kelly album) =

Live album by Paul Kelly
- Released: 26 April 2019
- Recorded: 2018
- Venue: Sydney Opera House
- Label: ABC / Universal

Paul Kelly chronology
Nature (2018)	Live at the Sydney Opera House (2019)	Thirteen Ways to Look at Birds (2019)

Live at the Sydney Opera House is a live album by Australian musician Paul Kelly. The album was released on 26 April 2019 and peaked at number 61 on the ARIA Charts. The album captures Kelly show from the forecourt of Sydney Opera House which was broadcast live across the Australia on the ABC.

At the AIR Awards of 2020, the album was nominated for Best Independent Blues and Roots Album or EP.

== Track listing ==
CD1
No.	Title	Length
1.	"Life Is Fine"
2.	"Rising Moon"
3.	"Finally Something Good"
4.	"Before Too Long"
5.	"Our Sunshine"
6.	"Firewood and Candles"
7.	"My Man's Got a Cold"
8.	"Careless"
9.	"Letter in the Rain"
10.	"I Smell Trouble"
11.	"From Little Things Big Things Grow"
12.	"Petrichor"
13.	"Sonnet 18"
14.	"Don't Explain"
15.	"Love Never Runs On Time"

CD2
No.	Title	Length
1.	"To Her Door"
2.	"Josephina"
3.	"Deeper Water"
4.	"God Told Me To"
5.	"Dumb Things"
6.	"Sweet Guy"
7.	"How to Make Gravy"
8.	"Hasn't It Rained"
9.	"Sydney from a 747"
10.	"Look So Fine, Feel So Low"
11.	"Darling It Hurts"
12.	"None of Your Business Now"
13.	"Leaps and Bounds"
14.	"Meet Me in the Middle of the Air"

== Charts ==
Chart (2019)	Peak position
Australian Albums Chart (ARIA)	61

== Release history ==
Region	Date	Format	Label	Catalogue
Australia	26 April 2019	2x CD, streaming, Digital Download	ABC / Universal Music Australia	7741405
