= Steve Connolly =

Australian musician (1959–1995)

- Born: Stephen James Connolly; 3 January 1959; Melbourne, Victoria, Australia
- Died: 16 May 1995 (aged 36) Melbourne, Victoria, Australia
- Genres: Rock
- Occupations: Musician, producer
- Instruments: Guitar, vocals
- Years active: 1972–1995
- Label: Atlantis

Stephen James Connolly (1959–1995) was an Australian musician and record producer. He is primarily known as the lead guitarist and singer in Paul Kelly's backing band The Coloured Girls/Messengers from 1984 to 1991. Steve played melodically and with great economy. This created space for him to embellish the songs with volume swells, pickup changes, the tremolo arm on his guitar as well as reverb and delay to add dynamics. He was the ultimate servant to the song and one of Australia’s best and yet underrated guitarists. While working for Kelly, he also co-wrote songs including "Darling It Hurts" (1986). Connolly, with Kelly, co-produced Charcoal Lane (May 1990) for Archie Roach. Connolly was working on his debut solo album, Steve Connolly and the Usual Suspects (1998), when he died in 1995 of a bacterial infection of the heart.

== Biography ==
Stephen James Connolly was born on 3 January 1959 as the second child of Joan (née Broomhall, 1936–2023) and Keith Connolly (1928-2005) in Melbourne. He was raised in East Malvern with three siblings, their mother worked as a travel guide and their father was a film critic and newspaper journalist.

Connolly, on lead vocals and guitar, was a member of Melbourne band Cuban Heels from 1979 to 1981 with Brian Allamby on drums, Chris Hunter on bass guitar, Spencer P. Jones on guitar and vocals, and Graham Lewis on keyboards. They feature on a documentary short film, Play Loud (1979), produced and filmed by Daniel Scharf, which depicts their performance at Hearts club in Carlton. That group released a sole single, "Little Girl", in August 1980 before disbanding in the following year.

Connolly was briefly a member of successive bands, Rare Things (1981–1982), Sex Flintstones (1982) and Yo Rinnie (1983) before he joined rock and country music group, the Zimmermen in July 1983. They had been formed a month earlier by Tim Brosnan on guitar (ex-Millionaires, True Wheels, Romantics, Paul Kelly and the Dots), John Dowler on lead vocals (ex-Spare Change, Young Modern, Glory Boys, Talk Show), Mick Holmes on guitar and backing vocals (ex-Negatives, Eric Gradman: Man & Machine, Romantics, Paul Kelly and the Dots, Fatal Attraction), Peter "Pedro" Steele on bass guitar (ex-Fatal Attraction), and Trevor Upton on drums (ex-Lipservice, Fatal Attraction). Connolly played guitar on their debut single, "Don't Go to Sydney" (December 1985), but had already left the group before the single was released and Steve did not appear in the subsequent video.

While a member of Cuban Heels, Connolly met singer-songwriter Paul Kelly, then lead singer of his band, The Dots. According to Kelly, the pair would jam together, and were sometimes joined by Connolly's friend Michael Barclay. In mid 1984 Connolly relocated to Sydney and replaced Maurice Frawley on guitar and Barclay (also ex-the Zimmermen) replaced Greg Martin on drums in the Paul Kelly Band. Kelly, Connolly and Barclay, recorded the album, Post (May 1985) in Clive Shakespeare's (ex Sherbet's) home studio. Connolly and Barclay were founding members of Kelly's new backing group, the Coloured Girls alongside Michael Armiger on bass guitar, Peter Bull on keyboards and Chris Coyne on saxophone. This line-up didn't last long. Armiger and Coyne left and Steve and Paul travelled to Townsville to play the Townsville International Hotel for 6 weeks, a stint which bonded the two musicians. Returning to Sydney they asked Jon Schofield (The Chinless Elite, The Stepfords, The Wetsuits, The Bum Steers, Grooveyard, Hell to Pay) to join the band as bassist (originally a guitarist) and from March to May 1986 the now four piece Coloured Girls and Paul Kelly recorded Gossip (September 1986), which provided the second single, "Darling It Hurts" (September), and is co-written by Connolly and Kelly. "Darling It Hurts" reached No. 25 on the Australian Kent Music Report singles chart in October.

Connolly's next album with Paul Kelly & the Coloured Girls was Under the Sun, which was issued in November 1987. Music journalist, Richard Guilliatt, joined the group's tour of the United States, where they performed as Paul Kelly & the Messengers and promoted the US version of Gossip. He noted, "Kelly had found a band to stick with and a musical blood brother in guitarist [Connolly]... The stars finally seemed to be in alignment." Kelly's next studio album, So Much Water So Close to Home (August 1989), was issued by Paul Kelly & the Messengers in all markets. Its lead single, "Sweet Guy" (June), was written by Kelly from a woman's point of view, initially Kelly wanted to give the song to a female vocalist but Connolly persuaded Kelly to sing it himself, "What's to stop you cross-singing?'".

Writer and journalist, Andrew Stafford reviewed Kelly's 2017 studio album, Life Is Fine, and reflected on Kelly's earlier career with the Coloured Girls/the Messengers. Stafford determined that "Connolly, the guitarist whose stinging, economical leads were the linchpin of the Messengers". Connolly had watched Archie Roach performing "Took the Children Away" on an indigenous television programme, Blackout in 1988. Connolly contacted Kelly and they asked Roach to support performances by Paul Kelly & the Messengers during 1989. In April 1990 Connolly and Kelly co-produced Roach's debut album, Charcoal Lane (May 1990) for Aurora/Mushroom. He produced the second album by another indigenous artist, Kev Carmody, Eulogy (For a Black Person), which was issued in November 1990 via Festival.

Connolly received another song writing credit on Paul Kelly & the Messengers' track, "Leaving Her for the Last Time", which appears on Comedy (1991). That album also includes Kelly and Carmody's co-written track, From Little Things Big Things Grow. Kelly disbanded the Messengers in late 1991. However, another album, Hidden Things, was issued by Paul Kelly & the Messengers in March 1992 with its tracks recorded from 1986 to 1991. One of its tracks, "Hard Times", was written by Connolly, who provided lead vocals.

While still a member of the Coloured Girls/the Messengers, Connolly undertook brief side-projects. One of these Da Brudders (1986) with Barclay, Richard Burgman, Bruce McDonald and Tony Robertson, became the Joeys in 1987 when they were joined by Phil Hall. Connolly produced and played guitar on the album Too Many Movies (1990). for Paul Kelly's second wife, Kaarin Fairfax (as Mary-Jo Starr). Steve also toured as part of Kaarin's country music band, Mary-Jo Starr's Drive in Motel.

Later groups Connolly joined were Love and Squalor (1991) with John Edwards on drums, Archie Larizza on bass guitar, Steve Lucas and Xanthe (both on vocals). Steve also formed The Troubles, a folk/rock band which included Deirdre (Dee), Mairead and Shelagh Hannan, Nick Rischbieth and Tom McEwan. Their mix of Celtic voices and instruments combined with rock guitars produced one self titled album on Larrikin records. Steve's guitar work on this album as well as his production was as consistent as his earlier work. Steve was also seen gigging around Melbourne with Mark Wallace's band Squeezebox Wally (1992) with Arch Cuthbertson on drums and Peter Lawler on bass guitar. In early 1994 Connolly brought his guitar to Sherry Rich's (a.k.a. Sherry Valier, ex-Girl Monstar) backing group the Grievous Angels, a "feisty country-rock" band, with Matt Heydon on keyboards (ex-Nick Barker and the Reptiles), Steve Morrison on drums and Doug Lee Robertson on bass guitar (ex-Icecream Hands). They issued an extended play, Sherry Rich and the Grievous Angels in January 1995.

Steve Connolly finally formed his own band, the Usual Suspects with Tim Millikan on bass guitar and backing vocals (ex-Divinyls), Stephan Fidock on drums and percussion, Dee Hannan on Hammond organ, and Graeme Lewis on piano and Hammond organ. This new band was envisaged as a way to kick start his career. Connolly had laid down guide vocals and all instrument tracks at Atlantis Studios in late 1994. Sadly he became seriously ill in mid 1995 and died on 16 May 1995 in Melbourne of a bacterial infection of the heart. Former bandmate Kelly provided a eulogy at Connolly's family's request, and wrote the song "I Wasted Time" after attending the funeral. It appears on Kelly's album ...Nothing but a Dream (August 2001). Final production on Steve's debut album, Steve Connolly and the Usual Suspects, was posthumously picked up by his friends and primarily Tim Millikan. and was finally released in 1998. Kelly listed Connolly's influences as, Hubert Sumlin, Brian Wilson, George Jones, the Ramones, Neil Young and Marvin Gaye, he was "soaking up all these opposites to form his own direct, melodic style." Kelly praised the album, "You'll hear a guitar player who didn't like solos, a songwriter who paid attention to details and a singer both innocent and cynical. Oh yeah, the band's pretty good too", when he attended its launch.
