= Hidden Things =

Studio album by Paul Kelly & the Messengers
- Released: 22 March 1992
- Recorded: 1986–1991
- Genre: Folk rock
- Length: 70:43
- Label: Mushroom, White
- Producer: Guy Gray, Alan Thorne, Paul Kelly, Gavin Mackillop, Steve Gordon, Paul Petran, Steve Connolly

Paul Kelly & the Messengers chronology
Comedy (1991)	Hidden Things (1992)	Live, May 1992 (1992)

Singles from Hidden Things
- 1. "When I First Met Your Ma" Released: March 1992

Hidden Things is an album by Australian folk rock group Paul Kelly & the Messengers released in March 1992 on Mushroom Records, which reached No. 29 on the ARIA Albums Chart. It also reached the Top 40 on the New Zealand Albums Chart. It is a collection of tracks recorded by Kelly and both his backing bands, the Coloured Girls and the Messengers, from 1986 to 1991, but were not issued on previous studio albums (except for "Bradman" and "Pastures of Plenty"). The album spawned a single, "When I First Met Your Ma", which was released in March. Messenger band members provide lead vocals on "Hard Times" from its writer Steve Connolly, and "Rock 'n' Soul" from its writer Jon Schofield. "Sweet Guy Waltz" is a slower version of "Sweet Guy" which was on 1989's So Much Water So Close to Home. The album was re-released in 2011 as Hidden Things: B-sides & Rarities.

== Background ==
Paul Kelly & the Messengers gave their last performance in August 1991, with Kelly set to pursue a solo career. He justified his decision: "We forged a style together. But I felt if we had kept going it would have got formulaic and that's why I broke it up. I wanted to try and start moving into other areas, start mixing things up". To round out their career, Kelly organised Hidden Things to collect previously released B-sides, stray non-LP tracks, radio sessions, and other rarities recorded from 1986 to 1991. Except for "Bradman" and "Pastures of Plenty", the tracks had not appeared on earlier albums by Paul Kelly & the Coloured Girls or Paul Kelly & the Messengers.

The album was issued in March 1992, after the group had been disbanded, and reached No. 29 on the ARIA Albums Chart. In May Kelly recorded a set of solo performances which were later released as a double live album, Live, May 1992.

== Composition and recording ==
Tracks for Hidden Things were recorded between 1986 (by Paul Kelly & the Coloured Girls) to September 1991 (by Paul Kelly & the Messengers). The line-up of both bands was: Michael Barclay on drums and backing vocals; Peter Bull on keyboards; Steve Connolly on lead guitar (lead vocals on "Hard Times"); Kelly on guitar, lead vocals (except "Hard Times", "Rock 'n' Soul") and harmonica; and Jon Schofield on bass guitar. The album includes a cover version of Australian Crawl's 1983 number-one hit, "Reckless" which was recorded in 1988 and originally released by Paul Kelly & the Coloured Girls as part of the 1989 "Dumb Things" double single. The lead single from the album, "When I First Met Your Ma", describes Kelly's courting of his first wife Hilary Brown – they met at the Kingston Hotel during an early gig by his band The Dots and were introduced by Kelly's then-girlfriend, Juliet. "Sweet Guy Waltz" is a slower version of "Sweet Guy" which was issued as a single from 1989's So Much Water So Close to Home.

In 1984 Kelly met Connolly when the latter was a member of The Cuban Heels, the pair would jam together, and were sometimes joined by Connolly's friend Barclay. "Hard Times" was written and had lead vocals by Connolly. "Other People's Houses" describes a female house cleaner who takes along her son who observes the residents' opulence. "Special Treatment" deals with neglect of Indigenous Australians amid claims "by a Western Australian pastoralist that Aborigines receive better treatment than other Australians". "Rally Around the Drum", was written by Kelly with Archie Roach, and was about an indigenous tent boxing man. "Pastures of Plenty" is a cover of a Woody Guthrie folk song. During the late 1980s, Paul Kelly and the Coloured Girls often toured with folk rockers Weddings Parties Anything, and both groups combined for "Beggar on the Streets of Love", which was recorded live in the studio of Perth radio station 96fm by Steve Gordon and Bob Vogt. This live version appeared as the B-side on the 1990 single "Most Wanted Man in the World". The song had already been covered by Jenny Morris as "Street of Love" in December 1989.

In 1985, Kelly issued his debut solo album, Post, which spawned the single, "From St Kilda to Kings Cross". A re-recorded version by Paul Kelly & the Messengers was used for the B-side of their 1991 single, "Don't Start Me Talking", and appears on this album. "Rock 'n' Soul" has lead vocals performed by its writer Schofield. "Yil Lull" is a cover version of Joe Geia's 1988 song. "Bradman" describes the cricketer, Don Bradman, and was issued as a double-A single in January 1987 with "Leaps and Bounds" from the 1986 album Gossip. "Elly" is a cover of Kev Carmody's song from Carmody's 1990 album, Eulogy (For a Black Person), which was produced by Connolly. Carmody and Kelly co-wrote "From Little Things Big Things Grow", which appeared on Paul Kelly & the Messengers' 1991 album, Comedy and on Carmody's 1993 album, Bloodlines. The latter version was issued as a single in that year.

== Reception ==
Professional ratings
Review scores
Source	Rating
AllMusic	2/5 stars
Green Left Weekly	(favourable)

AllMusic's Mike DeGagne felt Hidden Things showed "Paul's genius for telling stories behind the jingle of his acoustic guitar is pure and plentiful throughout... [Kelly's] story telling can be likened to Harry Chapin's, except Kelly leaves more to the imagination, adding a sturdier foundation for pondering and analysis". Green Left Weekly's Deb Sorensen found that Kelly is "a very good songwriter who has avoided just churning out 'pop' music. His lyrics are meaningful and from the heart ... songs which are close to the experiences and feelings of so many Australians without ever becoming jingoistic or banal".

The album reached No. 29 on the ARIA Albums Chart and also reached the Top 40 on the New Zealand Albums Chart.

== Track listing ==
All tracks are written by Paul Kelly, except where noted

No.	Title	Producer(s)	Length
1.	"Reckless" (James Reyne)	Guy Gray	3:59
2.	"When I First Met Your Ma"	Alan Thorne, Gavin Mackillop	3:56
3.	"Sweet Guy Waltz"	Kelly	4:30
4.	"Hard Times" (Stephen Connolly)	Guy Gray	2:33
5.	"Other People's Houses"	Alan Thorne	6:34
6.	"Special Treatment"	Alan Thorne	3:29
7.	"Little Decisions"	Kelly	3:44
8.	"Rally Round the Drum" (Kelly, Archie Roach)	Gavin Mackillop	5:05
9.	"Pastures of Plenty" (Woody Guthrie)	Kelly	2:27
10.	"Beggar on the Street of Love"	Steve Gordon	3:06
11.	"Pouring Petrol on a Burning Man"	Alan Thorne	2:54
12.	"From St Kilda to Kings Cross"	Alan Thorne	2:48
13.	"Brand New Ways"	Alan Thorne	3:39
14.	"Rock 'n' Soul" (Jonathon Schofield)	Kelly	2:35
15.	"Yil Lull" (Joseph Geia)	Kelly	4:15
16.	"Bradman"	Kelly	7:30
17.	"Ghost Town"	Kelly	2:48
18.	"Elly" (Kev Carmody)	Paul Petran, Connolly	4:17

== Personnel ==
Paul Kelly and the Messengers

- Michael Barclay – drums, backing vocals
- Peter Bull – keyboards
- Steve Connolly – lead guitar, lead vocals on "Hard Times"
- Paul Kelly – guitar, lead vocals (except "Hard Times", "Rock 'n' Soul"), harmonica
- Jon Schofield – bass guitar, lead vocals on "Rock 'n' Soul"

Additional musicians

- Darren Gower – drum programming on "When I First Met Your Ma"
- Wendy Matthews – backing vocals on "Other People's Houses
- Ray Pereira – percussion on "When I First Met Your Ma", "Other People's Houses"
- Chris Wilson – harmonica on "Reckless"

Weddings Parties Anything – "Beggar on the Street of Love"

- Michael 'Mick' Thomas – co-lead vocals
- David Steel – lead guitar
- Pete Lawler – backing vocals
- Marcus Schintler – backing vocals
- Mark Wallace – backing vocals

Production work

- Producer – Guy Gray (tracks 1, 4), Alan Thorne (tracks 2, 5, 6, 11–13), Gavin Mackillop (tracks 2, 8), Paul Kelly (tracks 3, 7, 9, 14–17), Steve Gordon (track 10), Paul Petran (track 18), Steve Connolly (track 18)
- Engineering – Tim Ryan (tracks 9, 16)
- Mastering – Don Bartely
- Mixing – Alan Thorne (track 3), Tim Ryan (track 17)
  - Remixing – Gavin Mackillop (track 16)

Art work

- Lin Onus – cover art
- Pierre Baroni – art design

== Charts ==
Chart (1992)	Peak position
Australian Albums (ARIA)	29
New Zealand Albums (RMNZ)	39

== Releases ==
Format	Country	Label	Catalogue No.	Year
CD	AUS	Mushroom	MUSH D30748	1992
CD	AUS	Festival Mushroom	MUSH 322832	1996
