= Leaps and Bounds (song) =

Single by Paul Kelly

Single by Paul Kelly and the Coloured Girls

from the album Gossip / Under the Sun
- B-side: "Bradman"
- Released: January 1987
- Recorded: May 1986, Trafalgar Studios / Trackdown Studios, Sydney
- Genre: Rock
- Length: 3:22 / 7:28
- Label: Mushroom
- Songwriters: Paul Kelly, Chris Langman / Kelly
- Producers: Alan Thorne, Paul Kelly

Paul Kelly and the Coloured Girls singles chronology
"Darling It Hurts" (1986)	"Leaps and Bounds" (1987)	"Look So Fine, Feel So Low" (1987)

"Leaps and Bounds" / "Bradman" is a double A-sided single by Australian rock group Paul Kelly and the Coloured Girls released in January 1987. "Leaps and Bounds" is from their debut double album, Gossip (1986). "Bradman" did not appear on a studio album until the international version of Under the Sun (1988). The single reached top 100 in the Australian Kent Music Report Singles Chart. Due to possible racist connotations, the band changed its name, for international releases, to Paul Kelly and the Messengers. In 1997, Kelly was inducted into the ARIA Hall of Fame, at the ceremony Crowded House paid tribute to Kelly and performed "Leaps and Bounds". In October 2003, Xanthe Littlemore covered "Leaps and Bounds" for the tribute album, Stories of Me – A Songwriter's Tribute to Paul Kelly. In 2005, rock music writer, Toby Creswell described two of Kelly's songs: "Leaps and Bounds" and "From Little Things Big Things Grow" in his book, 1001 Songs. For the former, Creswell observed "The grand themes of [his] work are all there – Melbourne, football, transcendence and memory... [he] is a detail man – the temperature, the location, foliage". On 26 March 2006 Kelly performed at the Commonwealth Games closing ceremony in Melbourne, singing "Leaps and Bounds" and "Rally Around the Drum". In February 2009 Patience Hodgson (of The Grates), Glenn Richards and Kelly performed "Leaps and Bounds" at the Myer Music Bowl for SBS-TV's concert RocKwiz Salutes the Bowl. On 29 September 2012 Kelly performed "How to Make Gravy" and "Leaps and Bounds" at the 2012 AFL Grand Final although most of the performance was not broadcast on Seven Network's pre-game segment.

== Background ==
After recording his solo album, Post, in early 1985, Paul Kelly established a full-time band in Sydney. It included Michael Armiger (bass guitar, rhythm guitar), Michael Barclay (drums) and Steve Connolly (lead guitar). Bass guitarist Jon Schofield and keyboardist Peter Bull soon joined. Through a joke based on Lou Reed's song "Walk on the Wild Side", the band became known as Paul Kelly and the Coloured Girls. Armiger left and the Coloured Girls line-up stabilised in late 1985 as Barclay, Bull, Connolly and Schofield.

By May 1986, the band entered Trafalgar Studios and released their debut 24-track double LP, Gossip in September. It included remakes of four songs from Post. Gossip peaked at No. 15 on the Australian Kent Music Report Albums Chart. First two singles from the album were "Before Too Long" which peaked at No. 15 on the related Singles Chart and "Darling It Hurts" which reached No. 25. "Leaps and Bounds" was issued as one side of a double A-sided single in January 1987. A trimmed version of Gossip, featuring 15 tracks on a single LP, was released in the United States by A&M Records in July that year. Allmusic's Mike DeGagne noted that "[it] bursts at the seams with blustery, distinguished tunes captivating both the somberness and the intrigue thrown forward from this fine Australian storyteller".

Due to possible racist connotations, the band changed its name for international releases to Paul Kelly and the Messengers. They undertook a US tour, initially supporting Crowded House and then headlining, travelling across the US by bus. "Darling It Hurts" peaked at No. 19 on the Billboard Mainstream Rock chart in 1987. The New York Times rock critic Jon Pareles wrote "Mr. Kelly sang one smart, catchy three-minute song after another – dozens of them – as the band played with no-frills directness" following the band's performance at the Bottom Line Club in New York.

Paul Kelly and the Coloured Girls' second album, Under the Sun, was released in late 1987 in Australia and New Zealand; and early 1988 in North America and Europe (under the name Paul Kelly and the Messengers). On the Kent Music Report Albums Chart it reached No. 19 with the lead single "To Her Door", peaking at No. 14 on the related singles chart. The international version of Under the Sun included "Bradman". In 1992 "Bradman" also appeared on Hidden Things by Paul Kelly & the Messengers.

In 1989, Mushroom Records issued Leaps and Bounds – The Early Videos, a VHS compilation album of seven music videos which included "Bradman" and "Leaps and Bounds". Both were included on a second video compilation, Paul Kelly & the Messengers 1986– 1992 (1992). In 1997, Kelly was inducted into the ARIA Hall of Fame, at the ceremony Crowded House paid tribute to Kelly and performed "Leaps and Bounds". In October 2003, Xanthe Littlemore covered "Leaps and Bounds" for the tribute album, Stories of Me – A Songwriter's Tribute to Paul Kelly. In 2005, rock music writer, Toby Creswell listed "Leaps and Bounds" and "From Little Things Big Things Grow" in his book, 1001 Songs: The Great Songs of All Time and the Artists, Stories and Secrets Behind Them. On 26 March 2006 Kelly performed at the Commonwealth Games closing ceremony in Melbourne, singing "Leaps and Bounds" and "Rally Around the Drum". In February 2009 Patience Hodgson (The Grates), Glenn Richards and Kelly performed it at the Myer Music Bowl for SBS-TV's concert RocKwiz Salutes the Bowl. In November that year Kelly recorded a live version at the Triple J tribute concert, Before Too Long.

On 29 September 2012 Kelly performed "How to Make Gravy" and "Leaps and Bounds" at the 2012 AFL Grand Final although most of the performance was not broadcast on Seven Network's pre-game segment. Nui Te Koha of Sunday Herald Sun declared "Kelly, an integral part of Melbourne folklore and its music scene, and a noted footy tragic, deserved his place on the Grand Final stage – which has been long overdue ... broadcaster Seven's refusal to show Kelly's performance, except the last verse of 'Leaps and Bounds', was no laughing matter".

== Composition and recording ==
"Leaps and Bounds" is a song with a length of three minutes and twenty-two seconds. Its lyrics and music was written by Kelly with Chris Langman. From 1977 to 1978 Kelly and Langman had shared a house in the Melbourne suburb of South Yarra, where according to Kelly, "Chris and I sat around for hours, days playing guitars ... I played him my new songs as they kept coming and we made up tunes together". In August 1978 the pair founded Paul Kelly & the Dots and "started an exuberant song about nothing in particular called 'Leaps and Bounds', but didn't finish it". By 1981 Langman had left to work as an assistant director for Crawford Productions and Kelly rediscovered a cassette tape of the song, he continued to work on it with Langman. In 1982 the Dots disbanded and late in 1984 Kelly relocated to Sydney, where he eventually formed Paul Kelly & the Coloured Girls. In May 1986 the album, Gossip, was recorded at Trafalgar Studios. It was co-produced by Kelly with Alan Thorne (Hoodoo Gurus, The Stems) who, according to music journalist Robert Forster (former The Go-Betweens singer-songwriter), helped the band create "a sound that will not only influence future roots-rock bands but, through its directness, sparkle and dedication to the song, will also come to be seen as particularly Australian. Ultimately, it means the records these people made together are timeless". According to Kelly, Steve Connolly of the Coloured Girls "wrote the riff" and the group filmed a music video atop the Punt Road silos. The video was directed by Mick Bell. Creswell observed "The grand themes of Paul Kelly's work are all there – Melbourne, football, transcendence and memory... [he] is a detail man – the temperature, the location, foliage".

"Bradman" is a song with a length of seven minutes and twenty-eight seconds. The song is set in the key of D major, it uses "a comfortable speaking pace" and has a vocal range of A_{3}–D_{5}. Kelly is credited with both lyrics and music. The lyrics provide a biography of the Australian cricketer, Don Bradman's early career to 1933. The track was recorded in late 1986 at Trackdown Studios and was produced by Kelly. It has an accompanying music video directed by Jack Egan, which depicts Bradman in photos and archival footage. Kelly's father, John Kelly, had met Bradman in the 1950s, and the young Kelly idolised the cricketer. Kelly avidly read Irving Rosenwater's biography of Bradman, Sir Donald Bradman – A Biography (1978), and returned to the book when writing "Bradman". "I was fooling around with a circular series of three chords—the usual suspects D, G, A—over which I was singing a melancholy, falling tune... The music worked well for a long narrative, for moving between talking and singing". Kelly sent Bradman a copy of the video and the single, but as Bradman had no video player he hoped to view it at his daughter's place. After hearing the song, Bradman infamously replied: "I am flattered by your attempt". Kelly and his nephew Dan Kelly recorded both songs as part of Kelly's A – Z Tours from 2004 to 2010, it was issued on the 8× CD live album, The A – Z Recordings (2010).

== Track listing ==
=== Australian release ===
1. "Leaps and Bounds" (Paul Kelly, Chris Langman) – 3:22
2. "Bradman" (Kelly) – 7:28

== Personnel ==
Paul Kelly and the Coloured Girls

- Paul Kelly – acoustic guitar, lead vocals
- Steve Connolly – lead guitar, backing vocals
- Michael Barclay – drums, backing vocals
- Peter Bull – keyboards, backing vocals
- John Schofield – bass guitar, vocals

Recording details

- Producer – Alan Thorne ("Leaps and Bounds"), Paul Kelly ("Leaps and Bounds", "Bradman")

== Charts ==
Chart (1987)	Peak position
Australian (Kent Music Report)	51

== Certifications ==
Region	Certification	Certified units/sales
Australia (ARIA)	Platinum	70,000^{‡}
^{‡} Sales+streaming figures based on certification alone.
