= The Zimmermen =

- Origin: Melbourne, Victoria, Australia
- Genres: Pub rock; country
- Years active: 1983–1990
- Labels: Au Go Go; Mushroom/Festival
- Past members: see Members below

The Zimmermen were an Australian pub rock and country music band, who formed in June 1983. Members included John Dowler on vocals, Mick Holmes on guitar and vocals, Graeme Perry on drums, and Peter Tulloch on guitar. They released two albums, Rivers of Corn (February 1987), Way Too Casual (April 1989), before disbanding in 1990. Former guitarist Steve Connolly died in 1995.

== History ==
The Zimmermen were formed in Melbourne in June 1983 by Tim Brosnan on guitar (ex-Millionaires, True Wheels, Romantics, Paul Kelly and the Dots), John Dowler on lead vocals (ex-Spare Change, Young Modern, Glory Boys, Talk Show), Mick Holmes on guitar and backing vocals (ex-Negatives, Eric Gradman: Man & Machine, Romantics, Paul Kelly and the Dots, Fatal Attraction), Peter "Pedro" Steele on bass guitar (ex-Fatal Attraction), and Trevor Upton on drums (ex-Lipservice, Fatal Attraction). The band name is a pun on Bob Dylan's birth surname. Brosnan left the group in the following month and was replaced on guitar by Steve Connolly (ex-Cuban Heels, Rare Things). Later that year Upton was replaced on drums by Michael Barclay (ex-Japanese Comix, Little Murders, Runners).

Dowler was the group's main songwriter and "had written a batch of first-rate pop songs, and he began making plans" to record an album. However, late in 1984 both Barclay and Connolly had left to join Paul Kelly Band. Connolly was replaced by Peter Tulloch on guitar and vocals (ex-Wrecked Jets) while Barclay was initially replaced by Graeme Perry early in 1985 and then by Neil Osborn (ex-Wrecked Jets) on drums in mid-year.

The Zimmermen's debut single, "Don't Go to Sydney", appeared in December 1985 and was co-written by Dowler and Holmes. It had been recorded prior to Barclay and Connolly leaving the group. Australian musicologist, Ian McFarlane, described how, "[it] was an instant classic, an exceptional slice of harmony-drenched guitar pop. It became one of the most successful independent singles for 1986." Their debut album, Rivers of Corn (February 1987), was produced by Harry Williamson and the group, which was released via Au Go Go Records. It provided the group's second single, "Ordinary Man", in the same month.

During 1987 Steele was replaced on bass guitar by Alan Brooker (ex-Clean Cut, Paul Kelly and the Dots, Little Murders) and Perry returned on drums to replace Osborn. In November 1988 the band started recording their second album, Way Too Casual (April 1989), with Lobby Loyde producing. It was issued by Mushroom Records/Festival Records and was preceded in February by the related single, "What Really Hurts". McFarlane observed that the album, "was a more balanced effort than the debut, displaying a depth, freshness and sense of humour that made for excellent listening. [It] contained several of Dowler's most fully realised compositions." The group undertook a national tour but disbanded early in the following year. Steve Connolly died in May 1995, aged 36.

== Members ==
- Tim Brosnan – guitar (1983)
- John Dowler – lead vocals (1983–90)
- Michael Holmes – guitar, backing vocals (1983–90)
- Peter Steele – bass guitar (1983–87)
- Trevor Upton – drums (1983)
- Steve Connolly – guitar (1983–84, died 1995)
- Michael Barclay – drums (1983–84)
- Peter Tulloch – guitar (1984–90)
- Graeme Perry – drums (1985, 1987–90)
- Neil Osborn – drums (1985–87)
- Alan Brooker – bass guitar (1987–90)

== Discography ==
=== Albums ===
- Rivers of Corn (February 1987) – Au Go Go Records (ANDA 043)
- Way Too Casual (April 1989) – Mushroom Records/Festival Records (L30047, CD30047)

=== Singles ===
- "Don't Go to Sydney" (December 1985)
- "Ordinary Man" (February 1987)
- "What Really Hurts" (February 1989)
