= Live, May 1992 =

Live album by Paul Kelly
- Released: November 1992
- Recorded: May 1992
- Genre: Acoustic
- Length: 71:07
- Label: Mushroom

Paul Kelly chronology
Hidden Things (1992)	Live, May 1992 (1992)	Seven Deadly Sins (1993)

Professional ratings
Review scores
Source	Rating
AllMusic	3/5 stars

Live, May 1992 is a solo live double album by Paul Kelly and was originally released in 1992.

It was released on Mushroom Records in Australia and marked Kelly's solo departure from his band The Messengers. It was recorded at performances in Melbourne and Perth in May 1992. The album peaked at 72 on The Australian charts.

== Track listing ==
All songs written by Paul Kelly, except where noted

1. "Foggy Highway" – 3:40
2. "To Her Door" – 3:19
3. "Wintercoat" – 4:20
4. "Taught by Experts" – 2:22
5. "From Little Things Big Things Grow" (Kev Carmody, Paul Kelly) – 5:59
6. "I Can't Believe We Were Married" – 3:01
7. "Until Death Do Them Part" – 2:48
8. "Same Old Walk" – 4:13
9. "Don't Explain" – 3:08
10. "Stupid Song" – 3:37
11. "Brand New Ways" – 4:50
12. "Stories of Me" – 3:02
13. "Everything's Turning to White" – 4:57
14. "Dumb Things" – 2:54
15. "Just Like Animals" – 4:46
16. "Keep It to Yourself" – 3:20
17. "Won't Be Your Dog Anymore" – 5:46
18. "I Was Hoping You'd Say That" – 2:00
19. "Careless" – 3:07
20. "Invisible Me" – 3:44
21. "When I First Met Your Ma" – 4:34
22. "Most Wanted Man" – 4:10

== Personnel ==
- Andrzej Liguz – cover photography

== Charts ==
Chart performance for Live, May 1992
Chart (1992)	Peak position
Australian Albums (ARIA)	72
