= God Told Me To (song) =

Single by Paul Kelly

from the album Stolen Apples
- Released: June 2007
- Genre: Folk rock
- Length: 3:40
- Label: EMI Music (Australia)
- Songwriter: Paul Kelly
- Producers: Paul Kelly and the Boon Companions

Paul Kelly singles chronology
"Won't You Come Around" (2003)	"God Told Me To" (2007)

"God Told Me To" is a song by Australian songwriter Paul Kelly from his 2007 album Stolen Apples. Written by Kelly, who produced and performed the tune with his band members the Boon Companions, the song deals with a fictional character called John Johanna, who is on trial for murder. To explain his actions, Johanna defends himself by saying that God told him to do this. The song features biblical imagery.

== Video ==
The video for the song was first aired on ABC music video show Rage in June 2007. The video was directed by Natasha Pinkus, and was filmed in a single shot.

The video was nominated for a Dendy award at the 2007 Sydney Film Festival and won the 2007 Inside Film Award for 'Best Music Video'.

== Personnel ==
Credits:

- Paul Kelly – acoustic guitar, lead vocals
- Dan Kelly – electric guitar, banjo, vocals
- Dan Luscombe – electric guitar, keyboards, vocals
- Peter Luscombe – drums, percussion
- Bill McDonald – bass
