= Darling It Hurts =

- 7" single 1986 AUS release (Mushroom Records)

Single by Paul Kelly and the Coloured Girls

from the album Gossip
- B-side: "Preaching to the Converted"
- Released: September 1986
- Recorded: May 1986
- Studio: Trafalgar Studios, Sydney
- Genre: Rock
- Length: 3:18
- Label: Mushroom
- Songwriters: Paul Kelly, Steve Connolly
- Producers: Alan Thorne, Paul Kelly

Paul Kelly and the Coloured Girls singles chronology
"Before Too Long" (1986)	"Darling It Hurts" (1986)	"Leaps and Bounds" (1987)

"Darling It Hurts"
- 7" single 1987 US release (A&M Records)

"Darling It Hurts" is a song by Australian rock group Paul Kelly and the Coloured Girls released in September 1986 as the second single from their first double album, Gossip. The song, written by Kelly with lead guitarist Steve Connolly, reached No. 25 on the Australian Kent Music Report Singles Chart in October. It was issued in 1987 on A&M Records in the United States, where it reached No. 19 on the Billboard Mainstream Rock Chart. Due to possible racist connotations the band changed its name, for international releases, to Paul Kelly and the Messengers. According to Allmusic's Mike Gagne, "Kelly's pain can be felt as he describes an ex-girlfriend of his who has turned to prostitution."

== Background ==
After recording his solo album, Post in early 1985, Kelly established a full-time band in Sydney. It included Michael Armiger (bass guitar, rhythm guitar), Michael Barclay (drums, later in Weddings, Parties, Anything) and Steve Connolly (lead guitar). Bass guitarist Jon Schofield and the keyboard player Peter Bull soon joined. Through a joke based on Lou Reed's song "Walk on the Wild Side", the band became known as Paul Kelly and the Coloured Girls. Armiger left and the Coloured Girls line-up stabilised in late 1985 as Barclay, Bull, Connolly and Schofield.

By May 1986, the band entered Trafalgar Studios and released their debut 24-track double LP, Gossip in September. It included remakes of four songs from Post. Gossip peaked at No. 15 on the Australian Kent Music Report Albums Chart. Singles from the album were "Before Too Long" which peaked at No. 15 on the related Singles Chart and "Darling It Hurts" which reached No. 25. The song was written by Kelly with lead guitarist, Steve Connolly.

A trimmed version of Gossip, featuring 15 tracks on a single LP, was released in the United States by A&M Records in July 1987. Allmusic's Mike DeGagne noted that "[it] bursts at the seams with blustery, distinguished tunes captivating both the somberness and the intrigue thrown forward from this fine Australian storyteller". "Darling It Hurts" was described as "more intricate" where "Kelly's pain can be felt as he describes an ex-girlfriend of his who has turned to prostitution".

The album was co-produced by Kelly with Alan Thorne (Hoodoo Gurus, The Stems) who, according to music journalist Robert Forster (former The Go-Betweens singer-songwriter), helped the band create "a sound that will not only influence future roots-rock bands but, through its directness, sparkle and dedication to the song, will also come to be seen as particularly Australian. Ultimately, it means the records these people made together are timeless".

Due to possible racist connotations the band changed its name for international releases to Paul Kelly and the Messengers. They made a US tour, initially supporting Crowded House and then headlining, travelling across the US by bus. "Darling It Hurts" peaked at No. 19 on the Billboard Mainstream Rock chart in 1987. The New York Times rock critic Jon Pareles wrote "Mr. Kelly sang one smart, catchy three-minute song after another – dozens of them – as the band played with no-frills directness" following the band's performance at the Bottom Line Club in New York.

Paul Kelly and the Coloured Girls' second album, Under the Sun, was released in late 1987 in Australia and New Zealand; and early 1988 in North America and Europe (under the name Paul Kelly and the Messengers). On the Kent Music Report Albums Chart it reached No. 19 with the lead single "To Her Door", written by Kelly, peaking at No. 14 on the related singles chart.

== Music and lyrics ==
"Darling It Hurts" is about a man who realises that his former lover is a prostitute. The chorus, "Darling it hurts to see you down in Darlinghurst tonight", refers to Darlinghurst Road, Kings Cross – at the time – a red-light district. The reference to "that man with the glad hands" relates to patrons slowing as they drive-by looking for a sex worker. Whilst "man with the glad bags" refers to dealers who sell drugs in zip-lock glad bags. Kelly indicated the title is based on artist and filmmaker Toby Zoates' infamous graffiti which he saw in Darlinghurst when living in Sydney.

The video, directed by Claudia Castle, is shot in black-and-white showing the band performing in front of a dancing couple. Castle directed several of the band's videos, including the 1988 ARIA Music Award winning video for "To Her Door".

The song was covered by Magic Dirt on the 2002 compilation album, The Women at the Well: The Songs of Paul Kelly.

== Track listing ==
=== Australian release ===
1. "Darling It Hurts" (Paul Kelly, Steve Connolly) – 3:18
2. "Preaching to the Converted" (Kelly) – 4:31

=== US release ===
1. "Darling It Hurts" (Kelly, Connolly) – 3:18
2. "Down on My Speedway" (Kelly) – 3:22

== Personnel ==
Paul Kelly and the Coloured Girls

- Paul Kelly – acoustic guitar, lead vocals
- Steve Connolly – lead guitar, backing vocals
- Michael Barclay – drums, backing vocals
- Peter Bull – keyboards, backing vocals
- John Schofield – bass guitar, vocals

Additional musicians

- Chris Coyne – saxophone
- Wayne Freer – trombone

Recording details

- Producer – Alan Thorne, Paul Kelly
- Engineer – Alan Thorne

== Charts ==
Chart (1986–1987)	Peak position
Australian (Kent Music Report)	25
US Billboard Modern Rock Tracks	19

== Certifications ==
Certifications for "Darling It Hurts"
Region	Certification	Certified units/sales
Australia (ARIA)	Gold	35,000^{‡}
^{‡} Sales+streaming figures based on certification alone.
