= Every Day My Mother's Voice =

Single by Paul Kelly and Dan Sultan

from the album Songs from the South: 1985–2019
- Released: 3 May 2019
- Length: 4:04
- Label: UMA
- Songwriter(s): Paul Kelly
- Producer(s): Steve Schram

Paul Kelly singles chronology
"And Death Shall Have No Dominion" (2018)	"Every Day My Mother's Voice" (2019)	"Rally Round the Drum" (2019)

Dan Sultan singles chronology
"Bwindi" (2019)	"Every Day My Mother's Voice" (2019)	"Gadigal Land" (2020)

Music video
- "Every Day My Mother's Voice" on YouTube

"Every Day My Mother's Voice" is a song by Australian recording artists Paul Kelly and Dan Sultan. The song was released on 3 May 2019, and recorded for The Final Quarter; a 2019 Australian documentary about the final stages of the Australian football career of Adam Goodes, during which he was the target of repeated booing by opposition fans and his relationship with his mother Lisa-May Sansbury.

The documentary director and producer Ian Darling told Music Feeds, "I've always loved the way Paul writes ballads and when I asked him to write a new song for Adam, I knew he would do it in his own original way… Paul wrote the song specifically with Dan Sultan in mind to perform it with him, which made it even more perfect."

At the 2019 Screen Music Awards in November 2019, the song won Best Original Song Composed for the Screen. At the APRA Music Awards of 2020, the song was shortlisted for Song of the Year.

The song is included in Kelly's greatest hits album, Songs from the South: 1985–2019.

== Music video ==
The music video, directed and produced by Ian Darling, was released on 2 May and features Kelly and Sultan performing the track, with intermittent footage and sound bites of Adam Goodes' on and off-field triumphs.

== Reception ==
Dan Condon from ABC said "From the moment those chiming guitars and Kelly's iconic voice ring out in the first few seconds, it just feels like we're in really safe hands. Of course Sultan, who is perhaps the best rock vocalist in the country right now, only adds value to this. He and Kelly sound brilliant together."

== Release history ==
Region	Date	Format	Edition(s)	Label
Australia	3 May 2019	Digital download; streaming	Standard	UMA
