= So Much Water So Close to Home =

Studio album by Paul Kelly and the Messengers
- Released: August 11, 1989
- Recorded: February–March 1989
- Studios: Ocean Way Studios, Los Angeles
- Genre: Folk rock
- Length: 40:58
- Labels: Mushroom/White (AUS/NZL); A&M (Rest of World)
- Producers: Scott Litt, Paul Kelly

Paul Kelly and the Messengers chronology
Under the Sun (1987)	So Much Water So Close to Home (1989)	Comedy (1991)

Singles from So Much Water So Close to Home
- 1. "Sweet Guy" Released: July 1989; 2. "Careless" Released: 23 October 1989; 3. "Most Wanted Man in the World" Released: 12 February 1990

Professional ratings
Review scores
Source	Rating
AllMusic	2/5 stars
Rolling Stone	3/5 stars

So Much Water So Close to Home is an album by Australian rock band Paul Kelly and the Messengers and was originally released in August 1989. The title comes from a short story of the same name by author Raymond Carver. Carver died in August 1988. Kelly co-wrote the score for the 2006 Australian film Jindabyne, which was also based on the same story. The entire album was recorded in the U.S. with producer Scott Litt, best known for his work with R.E.M. It was released on Mushroom/White Records in Australia & New Zealand and A&M Records for the rest of the world. The album peaked at #10 on the ARIA album charts, but none of its singles, "Sweet Guy", "Careless" and "Most Wanted Man in the World" had any Top 40 chart success. All tracks for the album were written by Kelly, who provided vocals, guitar and harmonica and also co-produced with Litt.

== Background ==
Paul Kelly had formed Paul Kelly and the Coloured Girls in 1985, named for a group mentioned by Lou Reed in "Walk on the Wild Side". For international releases from 1987 on, they used the name Paul Kelly and the Messengers to avoid possible racist interpretations. They released Gossip in 1986 on Mushroom Records in Australia and in 1987 on A&M Records for international release. Under the Sun was released in 1987 in Australia and in 1988 internationally.

Their next album, So Much Water So Close to Home was released in 1989 as by Paul Kelly and the Messengers in all markets. It peaked at #10 on the ARIA album charts, but none of its singles reached the ARIA Top 40 Singles charts. The entire album was recorded in the U.S. with producer Scott Litt, best known for his work with R.E.M. Litt had re-mixed some of Paul Kelly and the Coloured Girls' tracks from Gossip for its US release as by Paul Kelly and the Messengers. So Much Water So Close to Home was released on Mushroom/White Records in Australia and A&M Records in the United States and Europe in 1989.

The title comes from a 1975 short story of the same name by author Raymond Carver (later collected in What We Talk About When We Talk About Love). Album track, "Everything's Turning to White" is based on Carver's short story, it describes the tale of recreational fishermen who find a dead woman's body but continue their trip for three days before reporting their discovery to police. Kelly would go on to co-write the score for the 2006 Australian film Jindabyne, which was also based on the same story. In 1991 Paul Kelly and the Messengers released their next album Comedy.

== Track listing ==
All tracks written by Paul Kelly.

Side 1

1. "You Can't Take It with You" – 2:43
2. "Sweet Guy" – 3:38
3. "Most Wanted Man in the World" – 3:38
4. "I Had Forgotten You" – 2:59
5. "She's a Melody (Stupid Song)" – 4:31
6. "South of Germany" – 3:16

Side 2

1. "Careless" – 2:57
2. "Moon in the Bed" – 3:03
3. "No You" – 4:19
4. "Everything's Turning to White" – 4:11
5. "Pigeon/Jundamurra" – 2:03
6. "Cities of Texas" – 3:40

== Personnel ==
Paul Kelly and the Messengers

- Michael Barclay — drums, backing vocals
- Peter Bull — keyboards
- Steve Connolly — lead guitar
- Paul Kelly — guitar, vocals, harmonica
- Jon Schofield — bass guitar

Additional musicians

- Steve Berlin — baritone saxophone (track 2)
- Lenny Castro — congas (track 5)
- Paulinho da Costa — percussion (tracks 5, 7, 8)
- John Logan — harmonica (track 12)
- Lucky Oceans — pedal steel guitar (track 6)

Recording details

- Producer — Scott Litt, Paul Kelly
- Engineer — Scott Litt
  - Assistant — Clif Norrell, Jim Dineen
- Sequencer — David Russo (tracks 5, 9, 10)
- Studio — Ocean Way Studios, Los Angeles
  - Mastered — Precision Lacquer
  - Mixed — The Grey Room

== Charts ==
=== Weekly charts ===
Chart (1989)	Peak position
Australian Albums (ARIA)	10
New Zealand Albums (RMNZ)	26

=== Year-end charts ===
Chart (1989)	Position
ARIA Albums Chart	87

== Certifications ==
Region	Certification	Certified units/sales
Australia (ARIA)	Gold	35,000^{^}
^{^} Shipments figures based on certification alone.
