= Comedy (Paul Kelly & The Messengers album) =

Studio album by Paul Kelly & The Messengers
- Released: 1991
- Studio: Trafalgar Studio, Sydney
- Genre: Australian rock
- Length: 59:24
- Label: Mushroom
- Producer: Alan Thorne, Paul Kelly

Paul Kelly & The Messengers chronology
So Much Water So Close To Home (1989)	Comedy (1991)	Hidden Things (1992)

Singles from Comedy
- 1. "Don't Start Me Talking" Released: April 1991; 2. "Keep It to Yourself" Released: July 1991; 3. "Wintercoat" Released: 1991

Professional ratings
Review scores
Source	Rating
AllMusic	4.5/5 stars
Fast Folk	(favorable)

Comedy is a double album recorded by Paul Kelly & the Messengers and originally released in 1991. It peaked at No. 12 on the ARIA Albums Chart and remained in the top 50 for 12 weeks. Comedy reached the top 30 on the New Zealand Albums Chart.

It was released via Mushroom Records in Australia and New Zealand, and via Doctor Dream Records in the United States. Track 9, "Take Your Time" is used in the 1997 Australian comedy feature film, The Castle. This was the last album released before the partnership of Kelly & the Messengers was dissolved.

== Track listing ==
All songs written by Paul Kelly, except where noted.

1. "Don't Start Me Talking" – 3:30
2. "Stories of Me" – 2:56
3. "Winter Coat" – 3:58
4. "It's All Downhill from Here" – 3:03
5. "Leaving Her for the Last Time" (Steve Connolly) – 2:10
6. "Brighter" – 4:25
7. "Your Little Sister (Is a Big Girl Now)" – 3:02
8. "I Won't Be Your Dog Anymore" – 5:40
9. "Take Your Time" – 2:32
10. "Sydney from a 727" – 2:46
11. "Buffalo Ballet" (John Cale) – 3:52
12. "I Can't Believe We Were Married" – 2:30
13. "From Little Things Big Things Grow" (Paul Kelly, Kev Carmody) – 6:51
14. "Blue Stranger" – 3:04
15. "Keep It to Yourself" – 3:50
16. "(You Can Put Your) Shoes Under My Bed" – 3:31
17. "Invisible Me" – 4:14
18. "Little Boy Don't Lose Your Balls" – 1:20
19. "David Gower" (hidden track) – 0:54

== Personnel ==
Musicians

- Paul Kelly - guitar, harmonica, vocals,
- Michael Barclay - percussion, drums, vocals
- Peter Bull - accordion, keyboards
- Paul Burton - bass
- Steve Connolly - guitar, vocals
- Ray Pereira - percussion, cardboard box
- Jon Schofield - bass, vocals
- Ian Simpson - guitar, banjo, mandolin, pedal steel
- Kaarin Fairfax - vocals
- Shelagh Hannan - vocals

Production details

- Produced by Alan Thorne and Paul Kelly
- Engineered by Alan Thorne, assisted by David Mackie and Tristin Norwell
- Recorded & mixed at Trafalgar Studio, Sydney

== Charts ==
Chart (1991)	Peak position
Australian Albums (ARIA)	12
New Zealand Albums (RMNZ)	24
