= Under the Sun (Paul Kelly album) =

Studio album by Paul Kelly
- Released: November 1987
- Genre: Australian rock
- Length: 45:14
- Label: Mushroom/White (Australia); A&M (U.S.)
- Producer: Alan Thorne and Paul Kelly except "Dumb Things", produced by Martin Armiger and Paul Kelly

Paul Kelly chronology
Gossip (1986)	Under the Sun (1987)	So Much Water So Close to Home (1989)

Singles from Under the Sun
- 1. "To Her Door" Released: September 1987; 2. "Forty Miles to Saturday Night" Released: February 1988; 3. "Don't Stand So Close to the Window" Released: May 1988; 4. "Dumb Things" Released: 1988

Under the Sun
- 1988 North American/European release (A&M Records)

Professional ratings
Review scores
Source	Rating
AllMusic	3/5 stars
Robert Christgau	B
Rolling Stone	4/5 stars

Under the Sun is the second album by Australian rock group Paul Kelly & The Coloured Girls and was originally released in December 1987 by Mushroom Records. In the North American and European markets, it was released by A&M Records in 1988 with the band credited as Paul Kelly & The Messengers, with a different track order and listing.

On the Australian albums charts, it peaked at #19, with the single "To Her Door" peaking at #14. Another single, "Dumb Things," peaked at #36 in early 1989 on the Australian Recording Industry Association (ARIA) singles charts; it reached #16 on the Billboard Modern Rock chart. The song was included in the soundtrack for the 1988 Yahoo Serious film Young Einstein.

"To Her Door" won an ARIA Award in 1988 for 'Best Video' directed by Claudia Castle. In 2001, the Australasian Performing Right Association (APRA) listed the Top 30 Australian songs of all time, including "To Her Door", written by Kelly.

== Background ==
After relocating from Melbourne to Sydney in 1985, Paul Kelly began to play and record with a full-time band, which included Michael Armiger on bass guitar, Michael Barclay on drums, Steve Connolly on guitar, eventually bassist Jon Schofield, and keyboardist Peter Bull joined. Through a joke based on Lou Reed's song "Walk on the Wild Side", the band became known as Paul Kelly and the Coloured Girls. In September 1986 the band released their debut double LP Gossip. Due to possible racist connotations the band changed its name, for international releases, to Paul Kelly and the Messengers. They made an American tour, initially supporting Crowded House and then head-lining, travelling across the United States by bus. Jon Schofield replaced Armiger on bass guitar, Chris Coyne on tenor saxophone and Chris Wilson on harmonica

On the Australian albums charts, it peaked at #19 with the single "To Her Door" peaking at #14. First single from the album, "Bradman," had been released in January 1987 as a double-A side with "Leaps and Bounds" from Gossip but had little chart success. The third and fourth singles, "Forty Miles to Saturday Night" and "Don't Stand So Close to the Window" also had little chart success. Another single, "Dumb Things," peaked at #36 in early 1989 on the Australian Recording Industry Association (ARIA) singles charts; it reached #16 on the Billboard Modern Rock chart. The song was included in the soundtrack for the 1988 Yahoo Serious film Young Einstein.

In 1988, "To Her Door" won an ARIA Award for 'Best Video' directed by Claudia Castle. In 2001, the Australasian Performing Right Association (APRA) listed the Top 30 Australian songs of all time, including "To Her Door," written by Kelly.

"Desdemona" was featured in an episode of the Australian TV show Packed To The Rafters.

== Track listing ==
All tracks written by Paul Kelly unless otherwise indicated.

Original Australian LP/MC release

1. "Dumb Things" (aka "I've Done all the Dumb Things) – 2:31
2. "Same Old Walk" – 4:08
3. "Big Heart" – 3:22
4. "Don't Stand So Close to the Window" (Paul Kelly, A McGregor) – 2:35
5. "Forty Miles to Saturday Night" – 3:11
6. "I Don't Remember a Thing" – 2:04
7. "Know Your Friends" – 3:37
8. "To Her Door" – 3:18
9. "Under the Sun" – 4:18
10. "Untouchable" – 2:04
11. "Desdemona" – 3:46
12. "Happy Slave" – 2:30
13. "Crosstown" – 2:23
14. "Bicentennial" – 3:04

Bonus tracks for Australian CD release

15. "Bradman" – 7:26
16. "Pastures of Plenty" (Woody Guthrie) – 2:26

North American/European release

1. "Dumb Things" – 2:31 ^^
2. "Same Old Walk" – 4:08
3. "Big Heart" – 3:22
4. "Don't Stand So Close to the Window" (Paul Kelly, A McGregor) – 2:35
5. "Forty Miles to Saturday Night" – 3:11 ^^
6. "Untouchable" – 2:04
7. "Know Your Friends" – 3:37
8. "To Her Door" – 3:18 ^^
9. "Under the Sun" – 4:18
10. "Desdemona" – 2:07
11. "Happy Slave" – 3:46
12. "Crosstown" – 2:30
13. "Little Decisions" – 2:25
14. "Bicentennial" – 3:04

(^^) The European release featured slightly different mixes of these tracks.

== Personnel ==
Paul Kelly and the Coloured Girls

- Paul Kelly — acoustic guitar, vocals
- Michael Barclay — drums, vocals
- Peter Bull — keyboards
- Steve Connolly — guitar (electric), vocals
- Jon Schofield — bass guitar

Additional musicians

- Chris Coyne — saxophone (tenor)
- Chris Wilson — harmonica, vocals, saxophone (baritone)
- Jessica Kenny — vocals (on "Window")
- Joe Camilleri — saxophone (tenor) (on "Know Your Friends")
- Steve Miller — tin whistle (on "Window")
- Lucky Oceans — guitar (steel)
- Ian Simpson — banjo (on "Happy Slave")

Recording details

- Producer — Alan Thorne and Paul Kelly except "Dumb Things", produced by Martin Armiger and Paul Kelly
- Engineer — Alan Thorne
  - Assistant engineer — Kathy Naunton
- Recording & mixing studio — Alberts and Trafalgar Studios

Art work

- Design — Melanie Nissen
- Photography — Francine McDougall (cover photo), Isabel Snyder

== Charts ==
Chart (1987/88)	Peak position
Australian (Kent Music Report)	19
New Zealand Albums (RMNZ)	25

== Certifications ==
Region	Certification	Certified units/sales
Australia (ARIA)	Platinum	70,000^{^}
^{^} Shipments figures based on certification alone.

== Release history ==
Format	Country	Label	Catalogue No.	Year
LP/CD/Cassette	AUS	Mushroom	RML 53248	November 1987
LP/CD	USA	A&M Records	SP 5157	1988
CD	Germany	A&M	396979-1	1988
CD	AUS	Mushroom/White	MUSH322812	1997
