= Gossip (Paul Kelly and the Coloured Girls album) =

Studio album by Paul Kelly and the Coloured Girls
- Released: September 1986 (AUS); July 1987 (USA)
- Recorded: March–May 1986
- Studios: Trafalger Studios, Sydney
- Genre: Australian Rock
- Length: 81:38
- Labels: Mushroom/White (Australia); A&M (U.S.)
- Producers: Alan Thorne, Paul Kelly

Paul Kelly and the Coloured Girls chronology
Post (1985)	Gossip (1986)	Under the Sun (1987)

Singles from Gossip
- 1. "Before Too Long" Released: June 1986; 2. "Darling It Hurts" Released: September 1986; 3. "Leaps and Bounds" Released: January 1987; 4. "Look So Fine, Feel So Low" Released: July 1987; 5. "The Execution" Released: 1987

Professional ratings
Review scores
Source	Rating
AllMusic	4/5 stars
Los Angeles Times	3/4 stars

Gossip is the double LP debut album by Australian rock group Paul Kelly and the Coloured Girls. Produced by Alan Thorne and Paul Kelly, it was released on Mushroom Records in September 1986, which peaked at No. 15 on the Australian Kent Music Report Albums Chart, and achieved gold record status. There was commercial success for "Before Too Long" which peaked at No. 15 and "Darling It Hurts" reached No. 25 on the related Singles Chart. Gossip was released in different forms, initially as a double album with 24 tracks, it was edited down to a single 15-track LP for North American and European release on A&M Records, when released on CD in North America, it featured 17 tracks.

At the 1986 Countdown Australian Music Awards the album was nominated for Best Australian Album.

Paul Kelly and the Coloured Girls had been named for a lyric in Lou Reed's song "Walk on the Wild Side", but all North American and European releases were credited to Paul Kelly and the Messengers due to possible racist interpretations. "Darling It Hurts" peaked at No. 19 on the Billboard Mainstream Rock Chart in 1987. The initial 1987 Australian CD release contained 21 tracks; in 2005, a special deluxe 2-CD version was released in Australia which contained all 24 tracks. In October 2010, it was listed at No. 7 in the book, 100 Best Australian Albums.

== Background ==
After relocating from Melbourne to Sydney in 1985, Paul Kelly had recorded and released a solo album Post. Kelly then began to play and record with a full-time band, which included Michael Armiger on bass guitar, Michael Barclay on drums, Steve Connolly on guitar, eventually bassist Jon Schofield, and keyboardist Peter Bull joined. Through a joke based on Lou Reed's song "Walk on the Wild Side", the band became known as Paul Kelly and the Coloured Girls. Their first release was "From St Kilda to Kings Cross" but it did not chart. The line-up of the Coloured Girls changed rapidly with some stability late in 1985 as Barclay, Bull, Connolly and Schofield. Stuart Coupe, Kelly's manager, advised him to sign with Regular Records due to difficulty re-signing with Mushroom's Michael Gudinski. Michelle Higgins, Mushroom's Public relations officer, was a Kelly supporter and locked herself into a Sebel Townhouse Hotel room for nearly a week in mid-1986, refusing to leave until Gudinski had signed Kelly to a two-album recording contract.

In September 1986 Paul Kelly and the Coloured Girls released the 24-track double LP Gossip. The album included remakes of songs from Post and also featured "Maralinga (Rainy Land)", a song about the effects of British atomic testing on the Maralinga Tjarutja – indigenous people of Maralinga, South Australia. Gossip peaked at No. 15 on the Australian Kent Music Report Albums Charts, with singles chart success for "Before Too Long" which peaked at No. 15 and "Darling It Hurts" reaching No. 25. A single LP version of Gossip featuring 15 tracks was released in North America and Europe by A&M Records in July, 1987. Due to possible racist connotations the band changed its name, for international releases, to Paul Kelly and the Messengers. They made an American tour, initially supporting Crowded House and then head-lining, travelling across the United States by bus. "Darling It Hurts" peaked at No. 19 on the Billboard Mainstream Rock chart in 1987. The New York Times rock critic, John Pareles wrote "Mr. Kelly sang one smart, catchy three-minute song after another - dozens of them - as the band played with no-frills directness." following the band's performance at the Bottom Line Club in New York.

== Track listing ==
All tracks written by Paul Kelly unless otherwise indicated.

1. "Last Train to Heaven" – 4:51
2. "Leaps and Bounds" (Paul Kelly, Chris Langman) – 3:25
3. "Before the Old Man Died" – 2:35 Remixed by Scott Litt for North American issues
4. "Down on My Speedway" – 3:25
5. "White Train" – 2:47^^
6. "Randwick Bells" – 3:38
7. "Before Too Long" – 3:24
8. "Adelaide" – 3:39^^ Omitted from North American LP and CD issues
9. "I Won't Be Torn Apart" – 2:51 Omitted from North American LP issue
10. "Going About My Father's Business" – 3:34 Omitted from North American LP issue
11. "Somebody's Forgetting Somebody (Somebody's Letting Somebody Down)" – 3:41
12. "The Ballroom" – 2:02 Omitted from North American LP and CD issues
13. "Tighten Up" – 2:57 Remixed by Scott Litt for North American issues
14. "I've Come for Your Daughter" – 3:21 Omitted from North American LP and CD issues, 1993 Australian CD issue
15. "So Blue" – 3:32 Omitted from North American LP and CD issues
16. "The Execution" – 5:17 Remixed by Scott Litt for North American issues
17. "Incident on South Dowling" – 3:13^^
18. "Maralinga (Rainy Land)" – 3:57 Omitted from North American LP and CD issues
19. "Darling It Hurts" (Kelly, Steve Connolly) – 3:19
20. "Look So Fine, Feel So Low" (Kelly, Maurice Frawley) – 3:22^^
21. "Stories of Me" – 2:45
22. "Don't Harm the Messenger" – 3:47
23. "Gossip" (Kelly, Chris Coyne) – 2:56 Omitted from North American LP and CD issues, 1993 Australian CD issue
24. "After the Show" – 3:17 Omitted from North American LP and CD issues, 1993 Australian CD issue

^^ = previously recorded on Kelly's 1985 solo release, Post

== Personnel ==
Paul Kelly and the Coloured Girls

- Paul Kelly — acoustic guitar, vocals
- Michael Armiger — bass guitar (tracks 8, 14, 20)
- Michael Barclay — drums, vocals
- Peter Bull — keyboards, vocals
- Steve Connolly — guitar, vocals
- Chris Coyne — saxophone, saxophone (tenor) (tracks 3, 4, 6, 9, 10, 19)
- John Schofield — bass, vocals

Additional musicians

- Richard Burgman — electric rhythm guitar
- Joe Camilleri — saxophone (track 3)
- Mike Cleary — piccolo trumpet
- Wayne Freer — trombone (tracks 3, 4, 6, 9, 10, 19)
- Graham Lee — pedal steel guitar (tracks 1, 11, 21)
- Grant McLennan — talking (track 21)
- Astrid Munday — vocals (tracks 7, 17)
- Brian Nixon — timpani
- Dianne Spence — saxophone (track 20)
- Chris Wilson — harmonica (tracks 1, 11, 16)

Recording details

- Producer — Alan Thorne, Paul Kelly
- Engineer — Alan Thorne
- Remixer — Scott Litt (tracks 3, 13, 16 for North American release)

2011 CD Remastered by Rick O'Neil at Turtlerock Mastering. Art work

- Cover Art — Ann Redmond
- Photography — Wayne O'Farrell

== Charts ==
Chart (1986–87)	Peak position
Australia (Kent Music Report)	15
New Zealand Albums (RMNZ)	34

== Certifications ==
Region	Certification	Certified units/sales
Australia (ARIA)	Gold	35,000^{^}
^{^} Shipments figures based on certification alone.

== Release history ==
Format	Country	Label	Catalogue No.	Year
LP/Cassette	AUS	Mushroom	L45961/2	September 1986
LP, CD	USA	A&M	SP 5157	1987
CD	AUS	Mushroom/White	MUSH32282.2	1993
