= From Little Things Big Things Grow =

1993 song by Paul Kelly & The Messengers

Single by Kev Carmody and Paul Kelly

from the album Bloodlines
- A-side: "From Little Things Big Things Grow"
- B-side: "Freedom"
- Released: 1993 (Australia)
- Recorded: 1991 Paul Kelly & the Messengers version 1993 Kev Carmody version 2008 GetUp Mob version
- Genre: Rock, protest
- Length: 6:51
- Label: EMI, Festival
- Songwriters: Kev Carmody, Paul Kelly
- Producers: Alan Thorne, Paul Kelly; Paul Kelly & the Messengers version

"From Little Things Big Things Grow" is a protest song recorded by Australian artists Paul Kelly & The Messengers on their 1991 album Comedy, and by Kev Carmody (with Kelly) on his 1993 album Bloodlines. It was released as a CD single by Carmody and Kelly in 1993 but failed to chart. The song was co-written by Kelly and Carmody, and is based on the story of the Wave Hill walk-off (Gurindji strike) and Vincent Lingiari as part of the Indigenous people's struggle for land rights in Australia and reconciliation.

Cover of Getup Mob's version of the song

At the 1994 Country Music Awards of Australia, the song won Heritage Song of the Year.

On 4 May 2008 a cover version by The GetUp Mob, part of the GetUp! advocacy group, peaked at #4 on the Australian Recording Industry Association (ARIA) singles charts. This version included samples from speeches by Prime Ministers Paul Keating in 1992, and Kevin Rudd in 2008; it featured vocals by both Carmody and Kelly, as well as other Australian artists.

Ziggy Ramo reworked, expanded and updated the lyrics in his acclaimed 2021 version. The track also features vocals by Kelly.

== Background ==
The song was co-written by Kelly and Carmody, and is based on the story of the Gurindji Strike (also known as the Wave Hill walk-off) and in particular the role of the Gurindji leader of the strikers, Vincent Lingiari. It describes how the Gurindjis' claim to their traditional lands back from the cattle station on which they worked (owned by UK company Vesteys and called Wave Hill Station) sparked the Indigenous land rights movement. The nine-year protest won public support and eventually led to the Aboriginal Land Rights Act 1976, which provides the basis upon which Aboriginal Australian people in the Northern Territory can claim rights to land based on traditional occupation (native title), and the power of veto over mining and development on those lands. On 16 August 1975, a small part of their land was handed back to the Gurindji people on a 30-year-lease by Prime Minister Gough Whitlam, a symbolic and powerful moment in history.

== Evolution of the song ==
Carmody described writing the song:

"Paul Kelly and I had gone away on a camping trip in about '91 or something and we just kind of pulled it out around the campfire. Paul had a good chord progression and I thought it would be good to tell a little story over it. So, by about 2 o'clock in the morning, we had a six-minute song."

— Kev Carmody, 2008

It was recorded by Paul Kelly and the Messengers for their 1991 album Comedy released by Mushroom Records. Kelly included the song on his solo albums, Live, May 1992 and Songs from the South: Paul Kelly's Greatest Hits in 1997. Carmody recorded it on his 1993 album Bloodlines supplying vocals, guitar and didgeridoo, Kelly supplied vocals, guitar and harmonica, with numerous other musicians. This Carmody and Kelly version was released as a single in 1993 but did not chart. Also in 1993, an SBS television documentary, Bloodbrothers, examined Carmody and his music including this song.

Kelly attributes the song's major influences to protest songs of the civil rights movement and traditional folk songs. The melody is borrowed from "The Lonesome Death of Hattie Carroll" by Bob Dylan, with the opening line reworked from "The Times They Are a-Changin'".

"From Little Things Big Things Grow has its roots in songs like Woody Guthrie’s Deportees and The Lonesome Death of Hattie Carroll by Bob Dylan. And those songs grew out of the soil of other older songs."

— Paul Kelly, 2008

The lyrics are posted online on the National Museum of Australia website.

== Other versions ==
The song was performed on 7 July 2007 on the Australian leg of Live Earth by Kelly, Carmody, John Butler, and Missy Higgins. The song could have been considered "the event's anthem." Rolling Stone cited the performance as a highlight, stating the "whole crowd sung along – all eleven verses."

The GetUp Mob, organised by advocacy group GetUp!, released a version of the song on 21 April 2008. This featured elements of the apology to the Stolen Generations, made by Prime Minister, Kevin Rudd, on 13 February 2008, as well as former Prime Minister Paul Keating's Redfern Speech on 10 December 1992. The track features Carmody and Kelly, as well as other prominent Australian artists (including Urthboy, Missy Higgins, Mia Dyson, Radical Son, Jane Tyrrell, Dan Sultan, Joel Wenitong and Ozi Batla). This version peaked at #4 on the ARIA singles chart after its 28 April 2008 release, and #2 on both the Australian Chart and Digital Track Chart. The video for the song was produced by ARIA winner Hackett Films, and features John Butler, Leah Purcell, Pat Dodson and Anthony Mundine. Carmody described the 2008 version:

"This contemporised version of the song transforms us from a negative concept of the past to the positive possibilities of the future."

— Kev Carmody, 2008

A version of the song performed by The Waifs also appears on the 2007 Kev Carmody tribute album, Cannot Buy My Soul. The song is also featured on their 2009 Live from the Union of Soul album where it is co-performed with John Butler.

In November 2009 Triple J held a tribute concert for Paul Kelly in Melbourne, with John Butler, Missy Higgins and Dan Sultan performing this song. A recording from the concert, Before Too Long, was released in 2010.

The song was added to the National Film and Sound Archive's Sounds of Australia registry in 2010.

In 2013 Joan Baez, on her first Australian tour for 28 years, included it in her concerts to great applause.

Kelly and Carmody performed the song together on 5 November 2014 at the public memorial service at Sydney Town Hall for former Prime Minister Gough Whitlam, who is the "tall stranger" referred to in the song.

Electric Fields were joined virtually by Jessica Mauboy, Missy Higgins and John Butler for a performance of the song recorded at the Adelaide Botanic Garden conservatory, and broadcast for the season finale of ABC Television's 6-part pandemic series, The Sound, on 23 August 2020. The cover features on Cannot Buy My Soul: The Songs Of Kev Carmody, released on 21 August 2020, which includes covers of other Carmody songs by artists such as Jimmy Barnes, Courtney Barnett, and Kate Miller-Heidke.

Ziggy Ramo's 2021 version Little Things, with expanded lyrics featuring Paul Kelly on sung vocal was originally commissioned for ABC Radio's Triple J 'Like a Version' series. The re-imagined song features a heavy guitar coda where Ramo updates the number of black deaths in custody in Australia since the original release of the song and the report of the Royal Commission into Aboriginal Deaths in Custody in 1991. Ramo's Hip hop version samples the original acoustic guitar and banjo chord progression from the Carmody-Kelly recording.

== Recognition ==
A film of the same name was made by Rachel Perkins and Ned Lander in the four-part documentary series Blood Brothers in 1993, about the life of Kev Carmody.

The National Museum of Australia in Canberra mounted an exhibition called From Little Things Big Things Grow: Fighting for Indigenous Rights 1920–1970 from 10 September 2009 to 8 March 2010, which told the "story of Indigenous and non-Indigenous activists who fought together for justice and equal rights for Aboriginal and Torres Strait Islander people". After being dismounted, it travelled Australia until 26 May 2012.

In January 2018, as part of Triple M's "Ozzest 100", the "most Australian" songs of all time, "From Little Things Big Things Grow" was ranked number 70.

== Use in advertising ==
Industry SuperFunds, which manages collective projects on behalf of fifteen industry superannuation funds, is responsible for a number of prominent advertising and marketing campaigns on behalf of its membership. Its "From little things" campaign, used "From Little Things, Big Things Grow" from September 2009 until the end of 2014, and it continues to use the words "From little things..." as a slogan.

== Track listing ==
1. "From Little Things Big Things Grow" (Kelly, Carmody) - 6:51
2. "Freedom" (Bart Willoughby, Carmody) - 6:49

== Personnel ==
=== Paul Kelly and the Messengers 1991 version ===
Paul Kelly and the Messengers

- Paul Kelly — guitar, harmonica, vocals,
- Michael Barclay — percussion, drums, vocals
- Peter Bull — accordion, keyboards
- Steve Connolly — guitar, vocals
- Jon Schofield — bass guitar, vocals

Additional musicians

- Paul Burton — bass guitar
- Shelagh, Mairead and Deirdre Hannan — vocals
- Ray Pereira — percussion, cardboard box
- Ian Simpson — guitar, banjo, mandolin, pedal steel
- Ernie Dingo - Didgeridoo

Recording details

- Producer — Alan Thorne, Paul Kelly
- Engineer — Alan Thorne
  - Assistant engineer — David Mackie, Tristin Norwell
- Recorded & mixed — at Trafalgar Studio, Sydney

=== Kev Carmody 1993 version ===
- Kev Carmody — vocals, guitar, didgeridoo
- Paul Kelly — vocals, guitar, harmonica

Additional musicians

- Steve Berry — guitar
- Murray Cook — piano, keyboards
- Leroy Cummins — lead guitar
- Salley Dastey, Lou Bennett, Amy Saunders, Will Hogg, Kirsten Mackenzie, Melanie Shanahan — vocals
- Brenda Gifford, Marlene Cummins — saxophone
- John Gillies — drums, computer sequencing
- John Lacey — didgeridoo, sound effects
- Vanessa Lucas — bass guitar
- Shan Moynihan — violoncello
- Andrew O'Phee — guitars, mandolin, vocals
- Claes Pearce — violin, viola, vocals
- John Tebbitt, Martin Cilea — computer sequencing

Recording details

- Recorded — at Megaphon Studios, Electric Avenue and Music Farm Studios

== Certifications ==
Region	Certification	Certified units/sales
Australia (ARIA)	Platinum	70,000^{‡}
^{‡} Sales+streaming figures based on certification alone.
