= Kev Carmody =

Australian singer-songwriter

- Born: Kevin Daniel Carmody; 1946 (age 79–80); Cairns, Queensland, Australia
- Genres: Acoustic; folk rock; country; Australian rock
- Occupation: Musician
- Instruments: Vocals, guitar, harmonica
- Years active: 1987–present
- Labels: Larrikin/Festival, Song Cycles
- Website: Official website

Kevin Daniel Carmody (born 1946) is an Aboriginal Australian singer-songwriter and musician, a Murri man from northern Queensland. He is best known for the song "From Little Things Big Things Grow", which was recorded with co-writer Paul Kelly for their 1993 single. It was covered by the Get Up Mob (including guest vocals by both Carmody and Kelly) in 2008 and peaked at number four on the Australian Recording Industry Association (ARIA) singles charts.

Carmody has won many awards, and in 2009 was inducted into the ARIA Hall of Fame as well as being a recipient of the Queensland Greats Awards. In 2019, Carmody was recipient of the JC Williamson Award at the Helpmann Awards. He is also known for his activism for Aboriginal rights.

== Early life and education ==
Kevin Daniel Carmody was born in 1946 in Cairns, Queensland. His father, John "Jack" Carmody, was a second-generation Irish descendant and his mother, Bonny, an Aboriginal woman of Lama Lama and Bundjalung descent, were not allowed to get married because she was Aboriginal, and they went to Cairns because "the rules were a lot slacker there" due to the large number of migrants working in the cane fields. Jack (also known as "Bull"), had been a member of the red beret parachute commando unit in World War II, and had sustained a back injury during training.

Kevin's younger brother, Laurie, was born three and a half years later. His family moved to southern Queensland in early 1950, and he grew up on a cattle station near Goranba (and Tara) 70 kilometres (43 mi) west of Dalby in the Darling Downs area of south eastern Queensland. They lived in a hut with a dirt floor, and his parents worked as drovers, moving cattle along stock routes. The boys had to be hidden from authorities for fear of being taken from their parents.

At ten years of age, Carmody and his brother were taken from their parents under the assimilation policy as part of the Stolen Generations and sent to a Catholic school in Toowoomba, after Jack and Bonny were given the choice of sending the boys to school, or Bonny and the boys being sent permanently to live on Great Palm Island. The school was housed in an old army barracks on about 90 ha (220 acres) and run by nuns. Carmody said that the boys did not do much schoolwork, but spent their time feeding chickens, collecting eggs, "hauling in coal for the kitchen stoves and buttering bread for the nuns". They were allowed to visit their parents twice a year. He did not learn to read until he was 11 years old.

After schooling, he returned to his rural roots and worked for 17 years as a country labourer, including droving, shearing, bag lumping, wool pressing and welding. The family all pooled their earnings into the same bank account, and lived mostly off the land.

In 1967, he married Helen, with whom he has three sons; they later divorced but remain "good mates".

=== University ===
In 1978, at the age of 33, Carmody enrolled in university, Darling Downs Institute of Advanced Education (now part of the University of Southern Queensland).

At the night time I was always just interested in music, so I started to study music [by myself] and got to a standard, when I moved to Toowoomba and got a proper music teacher. And she said to me, 'you know, you're miles ahead of the standard they'd require to get into the music course at the University of Southern Queensland'.

— Kev Carmody

Due to his limited schooling, Carmody's reading and writing skills were not up to required university standard. Undeterred, he suggested to the history tutor that until his writing was suitable he would present his research in a musical format accompanied by guitar. While this was a novel approach at university, it was in line with the far older Indigenous tradition of oral history. Although Carmody had extensive historical knowledge, learnt by oral traditions, much of it could not be found in library history books and was attributed to "unpublished works". Carmody completed his Bachelor of Arts degree, then postgraduate studies and a Diploma of Education at the University of Queensland, followed by commencing a PhD in History, on the Darling Downs 1830–1860.

I was supposed to be studying history and music, but I'd be in the library with books on everything, geology, theorems of thermodynamics. I wished I'd had the time to take every course.

— Kev Carmody

At university, Carmody had used music as a means of implementing oral history in tutorials, which led to his later career.

== Music career ==
=== 1987-1989: Pillars of Society ===
In the early 1980s, Carmody began his musical career. He signed a recording contract in 1987 and his first album, Pillars of Society, was released on the Rutabagas label (a label founded by artist Frances Mahony and technologist Joe Hayes); the rights were later transferred to Larrikin Records/EMI in December 1988. It drew heavily upon country and folk styles with tracks such as "Black Deaths in Custody" and "Thou Shalt Not Steal" describing ignorance and oppression experienced by indigenous Australians. In the song "Thou Shalt Not Steal", Carmody draws attention to the hypocrisy of British settlers who brought Christianity to Indigenous Australians, including the commandment prohibiting theft, and yet took the land that the Aboriginal people had inhabited for more than 60,000 years. He emphasises the importance of land to the indigenous people, "The land's our heritage and spirit", and turns the Christian lesson given to indigenous people around: "We say to you yes, whiteman, thou shalt not steal". A Rolling Stone (Australia) journalist, Bruce Elder, described it as "the best album ever released by an Aboriginal musician and arguably the best protest album ever made in Australia". Pillars of Society was nominated for a 1989 ARIA Award for Best Indigenous Release. In subsequent recordings Carmody adopted a broad range of musical styles, from reggae to rock and roll.

That first album was acoustic because we didn't have enough money for anything else, but as I went on, I was always exploring sound. One of the things he [Carmody's grandfather] said to us was, you have to learn to listen to the wind. What he was saying was, use your imagination, widen it out, be aware of things around you. You learn to listen in another way. That's the key to my music. Just opening up to that sensory perception of sound.

— Kev Carmody

=== 1990-1992: Eulogy (For a Black Person) and Street Beat ===
Carmody's second album, Eulogy (For a Black Person), released in November 1990, was produced by Connolly, with musical support from the rest of the Messengers and members of pioneering Aboriginal rock band Mixed Relations. A review of the album noted that "Using a combination of folk and country music his hard-hitting lyrics deal with such potent material as the David Gundy slaying, black deaths in custody, land rights and Aboriginal pride and dignity. Carmody is deeply committed, powerfully intelligent and persuasively provocative. He uses images of revolutionaries... and challenges white Australia to stare unrelentingly at the despair which underpins Aboriginal society". The first single from the album, "Blood Red Rose", was described by Carmody as "a comment on personal isolation. Late night, big city alienation", whilst the B-side, "Elly", is the moving story of a young woman attempting to escape the poverty and racism of western Queensland, who finds herself trapped in Surfers Paradise working in the sex industry. Eulogy (For a Black Person) was nominated for a 1992 ARIA Award for Best Indigenous Release.

Early in 1991 Carmody co-wrote a song, "From Little Things Big Things Grow", with Paul Kelly; it was an historical account of the Gurindji tribe drovers' walkout led by Vincent Lingiari at Wave Hill Station in the Northern Territory during the 1960s, the incident which sparked off the indigenous land rights movement. It was first recorded by Paul Kelly & the Messengers on Comedy in May and included Steve Connolly as guitarist of the Messengers.

Carmody's 1992 EP Street Beat was nominated for a 1993 ARIA Award for Best Indigenous Release.

=== 1993-1999: Bloodlines and Images and Illusions ===
Carmody's third album, Bloodlines, was released in July 1993 and included his own version of "From Little Things Big Things Grow", with Kelly guesting on vocals, which was issued as a single. Bloodlines received a 1994 ARIA Award nomination for Best Indigenous Release, and the single "On the Wire" was nominated for this award in 1995.

Also in 1993 Carmody was the subject of a musical documentary, Blood Brothers - From Little Things Big Things Grow, by Rachel Perkins and directed by Trevor Graham, which explored Carmody's life, using music clips and historical footage.

After the release of his fourth album, Images And Illusions, in September 1995, produced by Steve Kilbey of The Church, The album was nominated for a 1996 ARIA Award for Best Indigenous Release. Carmody re-evaluated his life and career, reducing the demands placed on him by the mainstream recording industry. He continued performing, as a musician and public speaker, to audiences as diverse as the National Press Club and Aboriginal Australians in prison.

=== 2000-2006: One Night the Moon and Mirrors ===
2000 saw the release of Messages a compilation of songs from Carmody's first four albums. In 2001, together with Kelly, Mairead Hannan, John Romeril, Deirdre Hannan and Alice Garner, Carmody assisted in writing the musical score for the Australian film One Night the Moon. The soundtrack won a Screen Music Award at the 2002 Australasian Performing Right Association (APRA)/Australian Guild of Screen Composers (AGSC) Awards.

After a break of nearly ten years Carmody released his fifth studio album in 2004. The album, Mirrors, was completely self-financed and distributed. It was recorded at a friend's property "down the road" and was his first album recorded with computer technology. The songs on Mirrors cover a range of contemporary issues including refugee treatment and his thoughts on United States President George W. Bush, accompanied by the captured real life sounds of the Australian bush.

=== 2007-2009: Cannot Buy My Soul and ARIA Hall of Fame ===
In 2007, Kelly organised the double album, Cannot Buy My Soul - The Songs of Kev Carmody, with tribute songs by various artists on one disc and a second disc of songs by Carmody himself.

I first heard his music 20 years ago, and was drawn straight away to his blend of politics and prayer, poetry, anger and pride. His body of work is one of our great cultural treasures.

— Paul Kelly

On 31 October, Carmody was a special guest at the TV music channel MAX's "The Max Sessions: Powderfinger, Concert for the Cure" singing alongside front man Bernard Fanning to the controversial "Black Tears" and also joined in with the encore of "These Days". The concert was a fundraiser and thank you to the "unsung heroes" of breast cancer with an invitation-only audience made up of a special group of people – those who have suffered and survived breast cancer and their support networks. The concert closed Breast Cancer Awareness Month and was the brainchild of 20-year-old Nick Vindin, who had lost his mother Kate to the disease a few years earlier.

In the aftermath of the Australian Labor Government's 2008 apology to indigenous Australians, Carmody and Kelly reprised their song "From Little Things Big Things Grow" by incorporating samples from speeches by Prime Ministers Paul Keating in 1992 and Kevin Rudd in 2008. Released under the name The Get Up Mob, part of the GetUp! advocacy group, the song peaked at #4 on the Australian Recording Industry Association (ARIA) singles charts. This version featured vocals by Carmody and Kelly, as well as other prominent Australian artists (including Urthboy, Missy Higgins, Mia Dyson, Radical Son, Jane Tyrrell, Dan Sultan, Joel Wenitong and Ozi Batla).

On 22 October 2008, a DVD from two Sydney performances by Carmody and various artists was released as Cannot Buy My Soul: Kev Carmody.

On 27 August 2009, Carmody was inducted into the Australian Recording Industry Association (ARIA) Hall of Fame alongside The Dingoes, Little Pattie, Mental As Anything and John Paul Young, Carmody's first reaction was to laugh and reply "I must be getting into the Hall of Fame with the lowest record sales in history". At the ceremony, Missy Higgins inducted Carmody, who accepted the induction,

I accepted this for the Koori culture, the community and the family [...] It's a recognition of the input we've had on music. My songs came from what my grandmother, my mother, father, aunty and uncles told me. I'm just a conduit of stories.

— Kev Carmody, 27 August 2009

Carmody was joined onstage by Paul Kelly, Dan Kelly, Missy Higgins and John Butler to perform "From Little Things Big Things Grow". As of 2007 he lived with his partner Beryl on a 27-hectare (67-acre) bush block in south-east Queensland.

=== 2010-present ===
In 2015, EMI released the 4 disc Recollections... Reflections... (A Journey).

In 2020, Cannot Buy My Soul: The Songs of Kev Carmody was re-released featuring updated cover versions of Carmody's songs. To promote the album, Electric Fields were joined virtually by Jessica Mauboy, Missy Higgins and John Butler for a performance of "From Little Things Big Things Grow", recorded at the Adelaide Botanic Garden conservatory and broadcast for the season finale of ABC Television's 6-part pandemic series, The Sound, on 23 August 2020. The cover features on Cannot Buy My Soul: The Songs of Kev Carmody, released on 21 August 2020, which includes covers of other Carmody songs by artists such as Jimmy Barnes, Courtney Barnett, and Kate Miller-Heidke. Carmody has reduced his musical activities due to the effects of arthritis.

== Awards and nominations ==
=== ARIA Awards ===
The ARIA Music Awards is an annual awards ceremony that recognises excellence, innovation, and achievement across all genres of Australian music. They commenced in 1987. In 2009, Kev Carmody was inducted into the ARIA Hall of Fame.

Year	Nominee / work	Award	Result
1989	Pillars of Society	Best Indigenous Release	Nominated
1992	Eulogy (For a Black Person)	Best Indigenous Release	Nominated
1993	Street Beat	Best Indigenous Release	Nominated
1994	Bloodlines	Best Indigenous Release	Nominated
1995	"On The Wire"	Best Indigenous Release	Nominated
1996	Images & Illusions	Best Indigenous Release	Nominated
2009	Kev Carmody	ARIA Hall of Fame	inductee
2016	Recollections... Reflections... (A Journey)	Best Blues & Roots Album	Nominated

=== Country Music Awards of Australia ===
The Country Music Awards of Australia (CMAA) (also known as the Golden Guitar Awards) is an annual awards night held in January during the Tamworth Country Music Festival, celebrating recording excellence in the Australian country music industry. They have been held annually since 1973.

Year	Nominee / work	Award	Result
1993	"From Little Things, Big Things Grow"	Heritage Award	Won
2012	"Children of the Gurindji" by Sara Storer & Kev Carmody	Video of the Year	Won

=== Deadly Awards ===
The Deadlys Awards was an annual celebration of Australian Aboriginal and Torres Strait Islander achievement in music, sport, entertainment and community.

Year	Nominee / work	Award	Result
2005	himself	Lifetime Achievement in Aboriginal and Torres Strait Islander Music	awarded

=== Helpmann Awards ===
The Helpmann Awards is an awards show, celebrating live entertainment and performing arts in Australia, presented by industry group Live Performance Australia (LPA) since 2001. In 2019, Carmody received the JC Williamson Award, the LPA's highest honour, for their life's work in live performance.

Year	Nominee / work	Award	Result
2019	Kev Carmody	JC Williamson Award	awarded

=== Mo Awards ===
The Australian Entertainment Mo Awards (commonly known informally as the Mo Awards), were annual Australian entertainment industry awards. They recognise achievements in live entertainment in Australia from 1975 to 2016. Kev Carmody won one award in that time.

Year	Nominee / work	Award	Result (wins only)
1993	Kev Carmody	Folk Performer of the Year	Won

=== National Indigenous Music Awards ===
The National Indigenous Music Awards recognise excellence, innovation and leadership among Aboriginal and Torres Strait Islander musicians from throughout Australia. They commenced in 2004.

Year	Nominee / work	Award	Result
2021	Kev Carmody	Hall of Fame	inductee

=== Queensland Music Awards ===
The Queensland Music Awards (previously known as Q Song Awards) are annual awards celebrating Queensland, Australia's brightest emerging artists and established legends. They commenced in 2006.

Year	Nominee / work	Award	Result (wins only)
2007	himself	Grant McLennan Lifetime Achievement Award	awarded

=== Other recognition and honours ===
- 2001 Australian Film Industry's Open Craft Award in a Non-Feature Film for an Original Score
- 2008: Honorary Doctorate - University of Southern Queensland
- 2009: Great Queenslander in the Queensland Greats Awards
- 2010: "From Little Things" added to the National Film and Sound Archive's Sounds of Australia registry
- 2013: University of Queensland Alumni Awards: Vice Chancellor's Excellence Award for Indigenous Community Impact
- 2022: New student accommodation at the University of Queensland named Kev Carmody House

== Discography ==
=== Studio albums ===
Title	Details
Pillars of Society	Released: December 1988; Label: Rutabagas; Formats: LP, Cassette, CD
Eulogy (For a Black Person)	Released: November 1990; Label: Festival Records; Formats: CD, Cassette
Bloodlines	Released: July 1993; Label: Festival Records; Formats: CD, Cassette
Images and Illusions	Released: September 1995; Label: Festival Records; Formats: CD
Mirrors	Released: May 2003; Label: Song Cycles; Formats: CD, DD

=== Soundtrack albums ===
Title	Details
One Night the Moon (with Paul Kelly & Mairead Hannan)	Released: 2001; Label: MusicArtsDanceFilms; Formats: CD, DD

=== Compilation albums ===
Title	Details
Messages	Released: 2000; Label: Song Cycles; Formats: CD
Cannot Buy My Soul: The Songs of Kev Carmody	Released: February 2007; Label: Virgin / EMI; Formats: 2xCD, DD
Recollections... Reflections... (A Journey)	Released: 30 October 2015; Label: EMI; Formats: 4xCD, DD

== Extended plays ==
Title	Details
Street Beat	Released: December 1992; Label: Festival Records; Formats: CD

=== Singles ===
- "Jack Deelin" (1988)
- "Thou Shalt Not Steal" (February 1990)
- "Eulogy" (November 1990)
- "Cannot Buy My Soul" (December 1991)
- "Blood Red Rose" (April 1992)
- "Living South of the Freeway" (October 1992)
- "Freedom" (July 1993)
- "From Little Things Big Things Grow" (1993)
- "On the Wire" (May 1994)
- "The Young Dancer Is Dead" (1995)
