= Songs from the South Volume 2 =

Songs from the South - Volume 2

Greatest hits album by Paul Kelly
- Released: 10 November 2008
- Recorded: 1998–2008
- Genre: Australian rock
- Label: EMI/Capitol

Paul Kelly chronology
| Stolen Apples (2007) | Songs from the South - Volume 2 (2008) | The A – Z Recordings (2010) |

Professional ratings
Review scores
| Source | Rating |
|---|---|
| The Age | 4/5 stars |

Songs from the South - Volume 2 (Paul Kelly 98–08) is the second greatest hits album by Australian singer-songwriter Paul Kelly. It was released on 10 November 2008 by the EMI label.

In 1997, Paul Kelly released Songs from the South, which featured hit songs from 1985 to 1997. Songs from the South - Volume 2 comprises songs from Kelly's catalogue from 1998 to 2008 (including his solo albums such as Words and Music, Nothing But a Dream, Ways & Means, and Stolen Apples), as well as some from his collaborative efforts (such as Stardust Five and Professor Ratbaggy). It also includes a crowd favourite, "Every Fucking City", from the Roll on Summer EP, as well as two previously unreleased songs: "Thoughts in the Middle of the Night", and a tribute to Australian cricketer Shane Warne (to the tune of "London Is the Place for Me" by Lord Kitchener).

Songs for the South Volume 1 and Volume 2 were also released as a combined double album and as a limited (2,000) collectors box set, together with a DVD, Paul Kelly – The Video Collection 1985-2008 (a collection of Kelly's videos made over the past 23 years together with several live performances); a rare tour poster; a vintage T-shirt; three replica back stage passes; and a facsimile of the original hand written lyrics to "How to Make Gravy", individually signed by Kelly.

The album debuted on the ARIA Albums Chart at No. 25 and peaked at No. 22.

== Track listing ==
Songs from the South Volume 2
| No. | Title | Writer(s) | Length |
|---|---|---|---|
| 1. | "Nothing on my Mind" (from Words and Music (1998) by Paul Kelly) | Paul Kelly, Peter Luscombe, Steve Hadley | 4:55 |
| 2. | "I'll Be Your Lover" (from Words and Music (1998) by Paul Kelly) | P Kelly | 4:11 |
| 3. | "Love Letter" (from Professor Ratbaggy (1999) by Professor Ratbaggy) | P Kelly | 3:30 |
| 4. | "Our Sunshine" (from Smoke (1998) by Paul Kelly with Uncle Bill) | Mick Thomas, P Kelly | 3:31 |
| 5. | "Gathering Storm" (from Smoke (1998) by Paul Kelly with Uncle Bill) | M Saarelaht, P Kelly | 2:38 |
| 6. | "Every Fucking City" (from Roll on Summer (2000) by Paul Kelly) | P Kelly | 3:38 |
| 7. | "Be Careful What You Pray For" (from Silent Partner film soundtrack (2001) by Paul Kelly) | P Kelly | 3:01 |
| 8. | "Love is the Law" (from ...Nothing but a Dream (2001) by Paul Kelly) | P Kelly | 4:53 |
| 9. | "If I Could Start Today Again" (from ...Nothing but a Dream (2001) by Paul Kelly) | P Kelly | 2:50 |
| 10. | "The Oldest Story in the Book" (from Ways & Means (2004) by Paul Kelly) | P Kelly, Dan Luscombe | 4:20 |
| 11. | "Won't You Come Around" (from Won't You Come Around (2003) by Paul Kelly) | P Kelly | 3:52 |
| 12. | "Gunnamatta" (from Ways & Means (2004) by Paul Kelly) | P Kelly | 4:12 |
| 13. | "Your Lovin' Is on My Mind" (from Ways & Means (2004) by Paul Kelly) | P Kelly | 3:37 |
| 14. | "Song of the Old Rake" (from Foggy Highway (2005) by Paul Kelly and the Stormwater Boys) | P Kelly | 2:48 |
| 15. | "They Thought I Was Asleep" (from Foggy Highway (2005) by Paul Kelly and the Stormwater Boys) | P Kelly | 3:35 |
| 16. | "Everybody Loves You Baby" (from Stardust Five (2006) by Stardust Five) | Dan Kelly, P Kelly, D Luscombe, P Luscombe, Bill McDonald | 3:13 |
| 17. | "God Told Me To" (from Stolen Apples (2007) by Paul Kelly and the Boon Companions) | P Kelly | 3:41 |
| 18. | "You're 39, You're Beautiful and You're Mine" (from Stolen Apples (2007) by Paul Kelly and the Boon Companions) | P Kelly, Gregory Perkins | 3:35 |
| 19. | "Thoughts in the Middle of the Night" (previously unreleased) | P Kelly | 4:25 |
| 20. | "Shane Warne" (previously unreleased) | P Kelly, Aldwyn Roberts | 3:44 |

== Charts ==
=== Weekly charts ===
| Chart (2008–2014) | Peak position |
|---|---|
| Australian Albums (ARIA) | 22 |

=== Year-end charts ===
| Chart (2008) | Peak position |
|---|---|
| Australian (ARIA Charts) | 100 |

== Certifications ==
| Region | Certification | Certified units/sales |
|---|---|---|
| Australia (ARIA) | 2× Platinum | 140,000^{^} |
^{^} Shipments figures based on certification alone.
