= ...Nothing but a Dream =

2001 studio album by Paul Kelly

...nothing but a dream

Studio album by Paul Kelly
- Released: 13 August 2001
- Recorded: December 2000; April 2001
- Studios: Sing Sing South, The Shed, Yikesville (Melbourne); Balfour Street (London)
- Genre: Pop
- Length: 41:41
- Labels: EMI; Cooking Vinyl
- Producers: Paul Kelly; Mark Wallis; Mick Harvey

Paul Kelly chronology
Smoke (1999)	...nothing but a dream (2001)	Ways & Means (2004)

Singles from ...nothing but a dream
- 1. "Somewhere in the City" Released: 23 July 2001; 2. "Love Is the Law" Released: 8 October 2001; 3. "If I Could Start Today Again" Released: 28 January 2002

...nothing but a dream is a studio album recorded by Australian singer-songwriter, Paul Kelly. It was released on 13 August 2001 via EMI Records, and peaked at No. 7 on the ARIA Albums Chart and No. 46 on the Official New Zealand Music Chart. It was also released in the United States on Cooking Vinyl and included four tracks from Kelly's earlier extended play, Roll on Summer (2000). In Australia and New Zealand the album provided three singles, "Somewhere in the City" (July 2001), "Love Is the Law" (October) and "If I Could Start Today Again" (January 2002).

Two days before the album appeared Kelly had issued a five-track EP, Paul Kelly Exclusive CD, which was provided free with The Weekend Australian Magazine – it has two tracks, "The Pretty Place" and "Somewhere in the City", from the album. It was the first CD to be included with an Australian newspaper magazine, although this did cause problems with home deliveries, with many subscribers missing out. At the ARIA Music Awards of 2002 ...nothing but a dream won Best Adult Contemporary Album for Kelly and he was nominated for Best Male Artist.

== Reception ==
AllMusic's Jason MacNeil rated the US version of ...nothing but a dream at four-out-of-five stars and explained, "the songs speak of a certain longing and asking for redemption, but are dominantly roots pop arrangements." He observed, "An added bonus is the four additional tracks from a previously released EP, with the funky duet of 'Roll on Summer' being the high point of the lot."

Steve Newton of The Georgia Straight felt it, "contains its share of solo, acoustic ballads, but also sees the singer-songwriter performing with the full band." Newton described the track, "Would You Be My Friend", where Mick Harvey is "handling guitar, organ, bass, and drums" as a "soothing" rendition. They recorded it in Harvey's back yard shed and Kelly explained, "'He's got a bigger shed than me, but he's got the same eight-track tape machine, so we've got a similar basic setup'."

== Track listing ==
All tracks are written by Paul Kelly, except where noted

...nothing but a dream (August 2001) EMI (7243 534938 2 0)
No.	Title	Writer(s)	Length
1.	"If I Could Start Today Again"		2:51
2.	"Change Your Mind"		4:17
3.	"Midnight Rain"	Wendy Matthews, Paul Kelly	4:50
4.	"Close My Eyes"		4:51
5.	"Somewhere in the City"		3:16
6.	"Just About to Break"		3:57
7.	"Love Is the Law"		4:51
8.	"Pretty Place"		2:46
9.	"I Wasted Time"		2:47
10.	"Would You Be My Friend?"		2:59
11.	"Smoke Under the Bridge"		4:28

All tracks are written by Paul Kelly

...nothing but a dream (August 2001) Cooking Vinyl (COOKCD228) bonus tracks
No.	Title	Length
12.	"You're so Fine"	3:30
13.	"Roll on Summer"	3:14
14.	"I Was Hoping You'd Say That"	2:44
15.	"Every Fucking City"	3:35

== Personnel ==
Credits:

Musicians

- Peter Luscombe – drums
- Dave Ruffy – percussion, drums
- Spencer P. Jones – guitar (electric), vocals
- Bic Runga – vocals
- Bruce Haymes – organ, vocals, keyboards
- Billie Godfrey – vocals
- Paul Kelly – guitar, vocals, keyboards
- Shane O'Mara – guitar (electric)
- Renee Geyer – vocals
- Linda Bull – vocals
- Vika Bull – vocals
- Steve Hadley – bass, fiddle
- Mick Harvey – organ, bass, guitar (electric), drums (track 10)

Recording and artwork details

- Don Bartley – mastering
- Adam Rhodes – engineer
- James Sanger – co-production, programming, sound design
- Martin Philbey – photography
- Paul Kelly – producer (all tracks except track 10)
- Mick Harvey – producer (track 10)
- Mark Wallis – producer (all tracks except track 10)

Paul Kelly Exclusive CD

EP by Paul Kelly
- Released: 11 August 2001
- Recorded: 2000–2001
- Genre: Rock/pop
- Length: 12:51
- Label: The Australian/EMI
- Producers: Paul Kelly, Mark Wallis, Andy Baldwin, Professor Ratbaggy

== Paul Kelly Exclusive CD ==
Paul Kelly Exclusive CD is a five-track extended play by Paul Kelly, which was provided free with The Weekend Australian Magazine in August 2001. It is a compilation with four audio tracks including two from Kelly's forthcoming album, ...nothing but a dream ("The Pretty Place" and "Somewhere in the City"), one from his previous four-track EP Roll on Summer ("I Was Hoping You'd Say That") in 2000, and one from an associated project Professor Ratbaggy's 1999 self-titled album ("Love Letter"). A music video for "Somewhere in the City" was provided as the fifth track.

It was the first CD to be included with an Australian newspaper magazine, although this did cause problems with home deliveries, with many subscribers missing out.

=== Track listing ===
All tracks are written by Paul Kelly.

Paul Kelly Exclusive CD The Australian/EMI (CDRP637)
No.	Title	source	Length
1.	"Pretty Place" (audio)	...nothing but a dream'	2:45
2.	"Love Letter" (audio)	Professor Ratbaggy	3:31
3.	"I Was Hoping You'd Say That" (audio)	Roll on Summer	2:42
4.	"Somewhere in the City (acoustic)" (audio)	...nothing but a dream	3:53
5.	"Somewhere in the City" (music video)		3:17
6.	"Broadband Internet Demonstration" (video)	Telstra BigPond

=== Personnel ===
Credits:

Musicians

- Stephen Hadley – bass guitar (tracks 1–2)
- Bruce Haymes – keyboard (tracks 1–3)
- Spencer Jones – guitar (track 1)
- Paul Kelly – guitar, vocals (tracks 1–5)
- Peter Luscombe – drums (tracks 1–2)
- Linda Bull – vocals (track 1)
- Vika Bull – vocals (track 1)

Recording details

- Producer – Mark Wallis (track 1), Paul Kelly (tracks 1–5), Professor Ratbaggy (track 2), Andy Baldwin (tracks 2–3)
- Director – Tony Mahony (track 5)

== Charts ==
Chart (2001)	Peak position
Australian Albums (ARIA)	7
New Zealand Albums (RMNZ)	46

== Certifications ==
Region	Certification	Certified units/sales
Australia (ARIA)	Gold	35,000^{^}
^{^} Shipments figures based on certification alone.
