= Bands and accompanying musicians of Paul Kelly =

Paul Kelly's bands and members
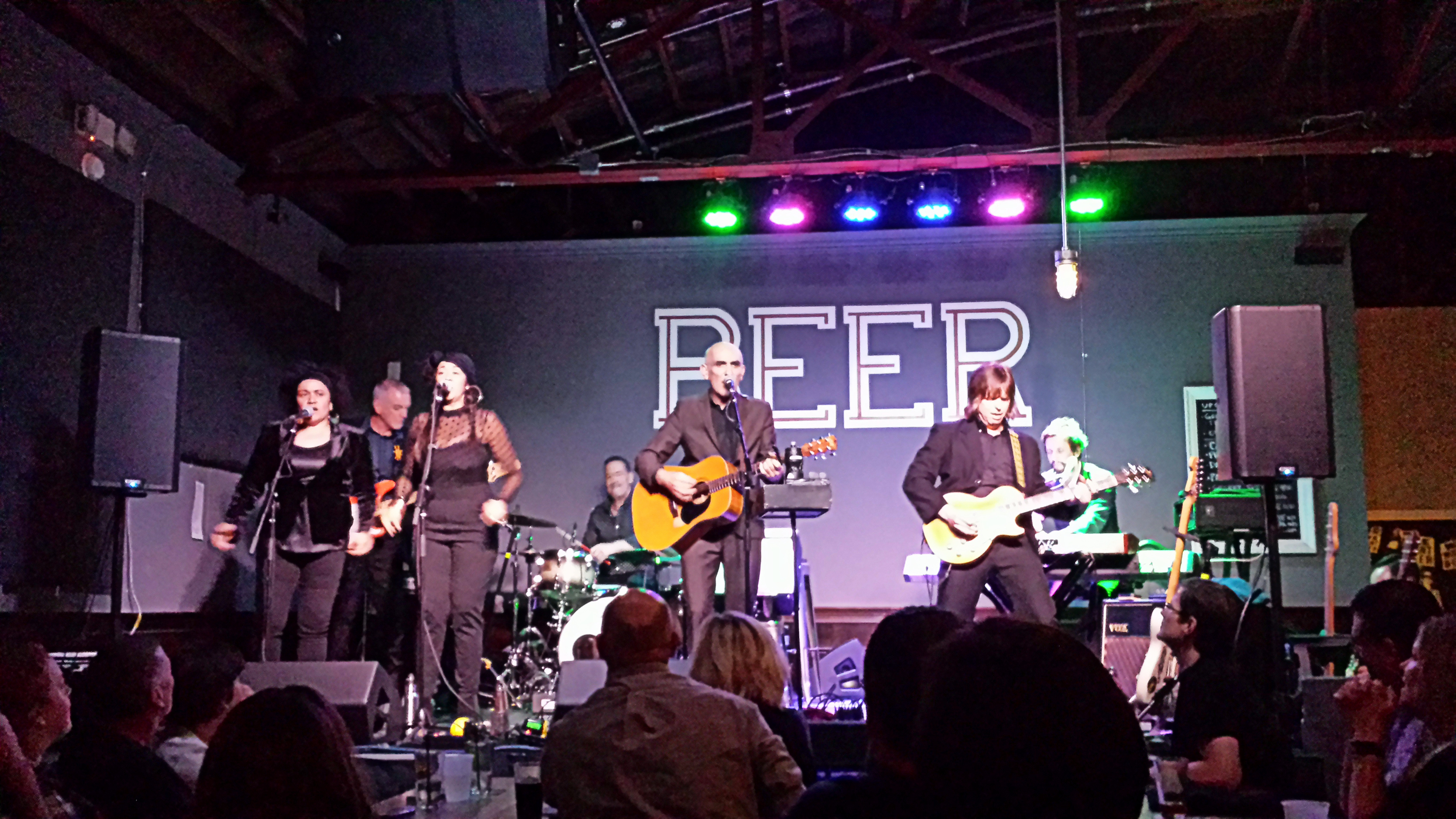
- Paul Kelly and his band, Raleigh NC, September 2017

Background information
- Genres: acoustic, folk, Australian rock
- Years active: 1974–current
- Labels: Mushroom; A&M; EMI; Capitol
- Members: Paul Kelly; Dan Kelly; Bree van Reyk; Zoe Hauptmann; J. Walker

Paul Kelly is an Australian rock musician. He started his career in 1974 in Hobart, Tasmania, and has performed as a solo artist, in bands as a member or has led bands named after himself. Some backing bands recorded their own material under alternate names, Professor Ratbaggy and Stardust Five, with Kelly as an individual member. As of September 2017, Paul Kelly's current band members are Cameron Bruce on keyboards and piano, Vika and Linda Bull on backing vocals and lead vocals, his nephew Dan Kelly on lead guitar and backing vocals, Peter Luscombe on drums and Bill McDonald on bass guitar.

== Current members ==
=== Paul Kelly ===
Active: 1974–present
Instruments: vocals, rhythm guitar, electric guitar, piano, keyboards, harmonica
Short bio: Paul Kelly performed solo from 1974–1976. He joined the Debutantes in Melbourne in 1976 and then became a member of The High Rise Bombers.
Release contributions: Entire Paul Kelly discography

=== Dan Kelly ===
Active: 2002–08; 2012–14, 2017–present
Instruments: guitar, backing vocals
Short bio: Dan Kelly is the second oldest of six children, the nephew of Paul Kelly. He grew up in Queensland and learnt the guitar at thirteen, studying Environmental Science at University, in Brisbane, in 1990. He formed his first band, Nord, and moved to Melbourne in 1996, where in 2000 he started playing solo shows, under the name Dank Alley, not wanting to trade on his famous uncle's name. In 2003 he released his first solo EP, Man O Mercy. The next year he formed a new band, Dan Kelly and the Alpha Males, with Gareth Liddiard (The Drones), Christian Strybosch (The Drones) and Tom Carlyon (The Devastations), with Liddiard and Carlyon travelling to Europe with their respective other projects Aaron Cupples, Dan Luscombe and Lewis Boyes joined the Alpha Males in 2005. In 2007, he disbanded the Alpha Males to allow the individual members to focus on other projects; and left the Paul Kelly band in 2008 to work on his solo material and collaborations with the Ukeladies. Dan returned to playing in Paul's live band in 2012, following the release of Spring and Fall. During 2015 and 2016 Dan had left Paul's band to record and then promote his solo album, Leisure Panic! (October 2015). He returned after Life Is Fine (August 2017) to rejoin Paul's touring band.

Release contributions:
- 2004: Paul Kelly – Ways and Means
- 2006: Stardust Five – Stardust Five
- 2007: Paul Kelly – Stolen Apples
- 2010: Paul Kelly – The A-Z Recordings
- 2012: Paul Kelly – Spring and Fall
- 2014: Paul Kelly – The Merri Soul Sessions

=== J. Walker ===
Active: 2012–present
Instruments: guitars
Short bio: Greg Walker, a.k.a. J. Walker is an Australian multi-instrumentalist and producer, best known for his work under the moniker Machine Translations. He has also worked as a screen composer, sound engineer and arranger. Some of the artists and clients Walker has worked with include Baz Luhrmann, C.W. Stoneking, Clare Bowditch, The Whitlams and Angie Hart. Walker worked with Paul Kelly on his nineteenth studio album, Spring and Fall. He served as a producer and also contributed upright bass guitar, dobro, violin and harmonica to the album. He then joined Paul's live band as a guitarist.

Release contributions:
- 2012: Paul Kelly – Spring and Fall

=== Zoe Hauptmann ===
Active: 2012–13
Instruments: bass guitar, acoustic bass, vocals
Short bio: Zoe Hauptmann is an Australian upright and acoustic bassist and also the Artistic Director for The Sydney Improvised Music Association SIMA

She has toured with the artists including Missy Higgins, Neil Finn, Katie Noonan, Tim Rogers (musician), Bill Chambers, Justine Clarke, All Our Exes Live in Texas, Lanie Lane, Lisa Mitchell and Wendy Mathews. Hauptmann first toured with Kelly during his national tour with Neil Finn in 2012.

=== Bree Van Reyk ===
Active: 2013
Instruments: drums
Short bio: Bree van Reyk is an Australian drummer, percussionist, vocalist and songwriter. She is best known for her work with Holly Throsby. She has also performed live with Youth Group and Seeker Lover Keeper, where she also co-wrote their song "Rely on Me." Other artists Van Reyk has performed with include Darren Hanlon, Toby Martin, Grand Salvo and Butterfly Boucher. Van Reyk began touring with Paul Kelly in 2013.

== Former bands/members ==
=== High Rise Bombers (1977–1978) ===
Members arranged chronologically:

- Martin Armiger (Toads, Bleeding Hearts) – guitar, vocals (1977–78) (left to join The Sports)
- Lee 'Fred' Cass (Red Angel Panic, Nineteen 87, Lip Arthur, Superlemon) – bass guitar (1977–78)
- Chris Dyson (Hot Cottage, Cruisers) – guitar (1977–78)
- Sally Ford (Flying Tackle) – saxophone (1977–78) (left to join the Kevins)
- John Lloyd (Relaxed Mechanics, Peter Lillee Band, The Cruisers) – drums (1977–78)
- Keith Shadwick (King Biscuit, Uncle Bobs Band, Sun) – saxophone (1977–78)
- Chris Langman (Spare Change, Parachute) – guitar (replaced Dyson in 1978)

=== Paul Kelly and the Dots (1978–1982) ===
Members arranged chronologically:

- Paul Gadsby – bass guitar (1978–80)
- Chris Langman – guitar (1978–82) (left to join Glory Boys)
- John Lloyd – drums (1978–79) (left to join Flowers/Icehouse)
- Chris Malhebe – guitar (1978–79)
- Chris Worrall (Captain Matchbox, The Pelaco Brothers, Bleeding Hearts, Stiletto) – guitar (1979–80) (replaced Malhebe in February 1979)
- Chris Dyson (Cruisers, High Rise Bombers, Stiletto, Romantics) – guitar, vocals (1979–80) (replaced Langman) (left to join Beats Working)
- Tony Thornton (Sidewinder, Front Page) – drums (1979–81) (replaced Lloyd)
- Alan Brooker (Clean Cut, Lil' Gypsy, Guitars of Love, Little Murders, Waz. E James Band, The Bourkenbacks) – bass (1980–82) (replaced Gadsby)
- Tim Brosnan (Millionaires, True Wheels, Romantics) – guitar (1980–82) (replaced Dyson in late 1980)
- Michael Holmes (Negatives, Eric Gradman: Man & Machine, Romantics) – guitar (1980–81) (replaced Worrall in late 1980)
- Maurice Frawley (Japanese Comix) – guitar (1981–82) (replaced Holmes)
- Huk Treloar (Bleeding Hearts, Sneakers, Little Heroes) – drums (1981–82) (replaced Thornton)
- Alex Formosa (Mick Pealing and the Ideals) – drums (1982) (replaced Treloar in mid-1982) (left to join Russell Morris Band)

=== Paul Kelly Band (1983–1984) ===
Members arranged chronologically:

- Michael Armiger (10,000 Guitars) – guitar (1983–84)
- Chris Coyne – saxophone (1983–84)
- Maurice Frawley – guitar (left to join Olympic Sideburns) (1983–84)
- Greg Martin (Mick Pealing and the Ideals, Little Murders, Goanna) – drums (1983)
- Michael Barclay (Japanese Comix, Little Murders, Runners, the Zimmermen) – drums (replaced Martin in late 1983)
- Graham Lee – guitar, pedal steel guitar (1984) (left to join The Triffids)
- Steve Connolly (Cuban Heels, Rare Things, the Zimmermen) – guitar (replaced Frawley in late 1984) (d 1995)

=== Paul Kelly and the Coloured Girls/Messengers (1985–1991) ===
After relocating from Melbourne to Sydney in 1985, Paul Kelly recorded and released a solo album, Post. Kelly then began to play and record with a full-time band, which included Michael Armiger on bass guitar, Michael Barclay on drums, Steve Connolly on guitar, eventually bassist Jon Schofield, and keyboardist Peter Bull joined. Through a joke based on Lou Reed's song "Walk on the Wild Side", the band became known as Paul Kelly and the Coloured Girls. The line-up of the Coloured Girls changed rapidly with some stability late in 1985 as Barclay, Bull, Connolly and Schofield. In September 1986 Paul Kelly and the Coloured Girls released their debut album, Gossip. When released in North America and Europe by A&M Records in July 1987, the band changed its name, for international releases, to Paul Kelly and the Messengers due to possible racist connotations. Subsequent releases were under the name Paul Kelly and the Coloured Girls for Australasia and Paul Kelly and the Messengers for international releases until 1989's So Much Water So Close to Home when all releases were by Paul Kelly and the Messengers until disbanding in 1991.

Members arranged chronologically:

- Michael Armiger – bass guitar (1985)
- Michael Barclay – drums, vocals (1985–88; 1989–91)
- Steve Connolly – guitar (1985–88; 1989–91)
- Chris Coyne – saxophone 1985 (only on Post)
- Ian Rilen (Rose Tattoo, X) – bass guitar 1985 (only on Post)
- Rick Grossman (Divinyls) – bass (1985) (left to return to Divinyls and eventually joined Hoodoo Gurus)
- Jon Schofield (Grooveyard) – bass guitar (1985–88; 1989–91)
- Peter Bull (Do-Re-Mi, Sea Monsters, Flaming Hands, Grooveyard) – keyboards (1985–88; 1989–91)
- Spencer P. Jones (The Johnnys, The Beasts of Bourbon, Olympic Sideburns) – guitar (1985) (left to join Legendary Stardust Cowboys)
- Billy Pommer Jnr (The Johnnys) – drums (1988)
- Noel Funicello (The Amazing Woolloomoolosers) – bass (1988)

=== Paul Kelly's Band (1995–1997) ===
Members arranged chronologically:

- Shane O'Mara (Stephen Cummings Band, Chris Wilson Band, Rebecca's Empire) – guitar (left to join Tim Rogers and the Temperance Union)
- Bruce Haymes (Richard Clapton Band, Russell Morris and the Rubes, Bachelors from Prague, Steve Hoy Band, Colin Hay Band) – keyboards
- Stephen Hadley (Vince Jones Band, Kate Ceberano and the Ministry of Fun, The Black Sorrows) – bass
- Peter Luscombe (The Black Sorrows, The Loved Ones, Linda Bull Band, David McComb and the Red Ponies, Rebecca's Empire, Four Hours Sleep) – drums
- Spencer P. Jones (Legendary Stardust Cowboys, Beasts of Bourbon, Chris Bailey and the General Dog, Sacred Cowboys) – guitar 1996 (left to rejoin Beasts of Bourbon)

=== Professor Ratbaggy (1999–2002) ===
Members arranged alphabetically:

- Stephen Hadley – bass, vocals
- Bruce Haymes – keyboards, organ, vocals
- Peter Luscombe – drums

=== Paul Kelly and the Boon Companions (2002–2007) ===
Members arranged alphabetically:

- Dan Kelly (Dan Kelly and the Alpha Males) – guitar, vocals
- Dan Luscombe (The Blackeyed Susans, Four Hours Sleep) – guitar, keyboards, vocals (left to join The Drones)
- Peter Luscombe – drums
- Bill MacDonald (Max Q, Neneh Cherry, Deborah Conway and the Mothers of Pearl, Frente, Ultrasound, Four Hours Sleep, Rebecca's Empire, Stephen Cummings Band) – bass, vocals

=== Paul Kelly and the Stormwater Boys (2005) ===
Members arranged alphabetically:

- Mick Albeck – fiddle
- James Gillard – bass
- Rod McCormack – guitar
- Ian Simpson – banjo
- Trev Warner – mandolin

=== Stardust Five (2005–2006) ===
Members arranged alphabetically:

- Dan Kelly – guitar
- Dan Luscombe – guitar, keyboards, vocals
- Peter Luscombe – drums
- Bill MacDonald – bass

=== Paul Kelly band (2007–2012) ===
Members arranged alphabetically:

- Cameron Bruce – keyboards, vocals
- Vika Bull – vocals
- Dan Kelly – guitar, vocals
- Peter Luscombe – drums
- Bill MacDonald – bass
- Ash Naylor – guitar
