= Ways & Means (album) =

Studio album by Paul Kelly
- Released: 17 February 2004
- Genre: Pop; folk rock
- Length: 95:26
- Label: EMI; Cooking Vinyl
- Producer: Tchad Blake; Paul Kelly

Paul Kelly chronology
...Nothing but a Dream (2001)	Ways & Means (2004)	Foggy Highway (2005)

Professional ratings
Review scores
Source	Rating
Allmusic	4/5 stars
Rolling Stone magazine	3/5 stars

Ways & Means is a double album recorded by Australian artist Paul Kelly and originally released in February 2004, which peaked at #13 on the ARIA Albums Charts. It won the 2004 ARIA Music Award for Best Adult Contemporary Album. It was issued on EMI in Australia and Cooking Vinyl in the US. Kelly's backing band were later called The Boon Companions and consisted of his nephew Dan Kelly on guitar, Peter Luscombe on drums and his brother Dan Luscombe on guitar and keyboards, and Bill McDonald on bass guitar. "Beautiful Feeling" was used as the theme song for the ABCTV series Fireflies (2004).

Paul Kelly & the Boon Companions released a DVD titled, Ways & Means later in 2004. It contained 31 tracks divided into three sections: 15 tracks subtitled, Live in Boston, 12 tracks subtitled, Musicmax Sessions - Live at the Sydney Opera House (recorded on 27 January), and four tracks subtitled, Film Clips.

== Background ==
Ways & Means was released by Paul Kelly on 17 February 2004, which peaked at #13 on the ARIA Albums Charts. Though identified as a solo record, it was more of a group effort, with a backing band later dubbed The Boon Companions co-writing many of the tracks. The Boon Companions consisted of Kelly's nephew Dan Kelly on guitar, Peter Luscombe on drums and his brother Dan Luscombe on guitar and keyboards, and Bill McDonald on bass guitar. On 7 February, the Australian Broadcasting Corporation had started broadcasting the television series Fireflies which featured a score by Kelly and Stephen Rae. The associated soundtrack CD Fireflies: Songs of Paul Kelly included tracks by Kelly, Paul Kelly & the Boon Companions, Professor Ratbaggy (containing Kelly and three earlier bandmates), Paul Kelly with Uncle Bill, and "Los Cucumbros" by the Boon Companions featuring Sian Prior, which was later a track on Stardust Five by Stardust Five (same line-up as Paul Kelly & the Boon Companions).

== Track listing ==
All tracks are written by Paul Kelly, Dan Kelly, Peter Luscombe, Dan Luscombe and Bill McDonald (except as below).

Ways & Means disc 1
No.	Title	Writer(s)	Length
1.	"Gunnamatta"		4:14
2.	"The Oldest Story in the Book"	P Kelly, D Luscombe	4:31
3.	"Heavy Thing"	P Kelly, D Kelly	3:26
4.	"Won't You Come Around"	P Kelly	3:52
5.	"These Are the Days"	P Kelly	4:02
6.	"Beautiful Feeling"		5:16
7.	"Crying Shame"		4:36
8.	"Sure Got Me (Where You Want Me)"	P Kelly	4:35
9.	"To Be Good Takes a Long Time (To Be Bad No Time at All)"	P Kelly	3:10
10.	"Can't Help You Now"	P Kelly, D Kelly	4:55
11.	"Nothing But a Dream"	P Kelly	7:36

All tracks are written by Paul Kelly (except as below).

Ways & Means disc 2
No.	Title	Writer(s)	Length
1.	"Little Bit O'Sugar"	P Kelly, D Kelly	6:49
2.	"Forty Eight Angels"		4:43
3.	"Your Lovin' Is on My Mind"		3:38
4.	"You Broke a Beautiful Thing"		4:51
5.	"My Way Is to You"	P Kelly, D Kelly	4:22
6.	"Curly Red"		3:44
7.	"King of Fools"		2:55
8.	"Young Lovers"	P Kelly, D Luscombe, D Kelly	3:06
9.	"Big Fine Girl"		2:50
10.	"Let's Fall Again"	P Kelly, D Luscombe, D Kelly, P Luscombe, B McDonald	8:15

== Personnel ==
Paul Kelly Band aka Paul Kelly & the Boon Companions Credits:

- Dan Kelly – guitars, vocals
- Paul Kelly – vocals, guitars
- Dan Luscombe – guitars, keyboards
- Peter Luscombe – drums
- Bill McDonald – bass guitar

Production details

- Producer – Tchad Blake, Paul Kelly

== Charts ==
Chart (2004)	Peak position
Australian Albums (ARIA)	13

== Certifications ==
Region	Certification	Certified units/sales
Australia (ARIA)	Gold	35,000^{‡}
^{‡} Sales+streaming figures based on certification alone.
