= Yil Lull =

- CD single cover

Single by Singers For The Red Black & Gold

from the album Our Island Home
- A-side: "Yiy Lull"
- Released: 1998
- Recorded: Sing Sing Studios, Studios 301
- Genre: Pop, World music
- Label: White Records, Mushroom Records
- Songwriter: Joe Geia

"Yil Lull" is a song written and performed by Joe Geia. It originally appeared on his 1988 album of the same name. Yill Lull means sing in Guugu Yimithirr. The colours used in the lyrics are the colours of the Aboriginal flag.

"Yil Lull" is considered an aboriginal anthem. It was performed by The Black Arm Band in their murundak concert. It has been covered by Singers For The Red Black & Gold, Paul Kelly and Marcia Howard (ex-Goanna).

== Singers For The Red Black & Gold ==
In 1998 "Yil Lull" was released as a single by Singers For The Red Black & Gold. This version was sung by Archie Roach, Paul Kelly, Christine Anu, Judith Durham, Kutcha Edwards, Renee Geyer and Tiddas with the music performed by Steve Hadley (Paul Kelly Band, Professor Ratbaggy) (bass), Bruce Haymes (Paul Kelly Band, Professor Ratbaggy) (keyboards), Spencer P. Jones (guitar), Peter Luscombe (drums), Shane O'Mara (Paul Kelly Band, Rebecca's Empire, Tim Rogers and the Temperance Union) (guitar). This version also appeared on a compilation for the 2000 Olympics called Our Island Home (2000, Festival Mushroom Records).

=== Track listing ===
CD single (MUSH01731.2)

1. Singers For The Red Black & Gold - "Yil Lull" (Joe Geia)
2. Christine Anu - "Island Home (The Chant Mix)" (Neil Murray)
3. Blackfire - "Got To Be A Chance" (Grant Hansen)
