= Bachelors from Prague =

Australian band

- Origin: Melbourne, Victoria, Australia
- Genres: R&B; jazz; funk
- Years active: 1985–1993; 2016; 2017
- Labels: 3333/Musicland; 3333/PolyGram; Larrikin; Mercury
- Past members: Russell Cook; George Frimil; Bruce Haymes; Henry Maas; Chris Minko; Andrew Philipp; Jeff Raglus; Tom Roberts; Justin Stanford; Thiery Fossemalle

Bachelors from Prague were an Australian band formed in 1985. Original members were Russell Cook on drums, George Friml on bass guitar, Bruce Haymes on keyboards, Henry Maas on vocals, Chris Minko on trumpet, Andrew Philipp on saxophone, Jeff Raglus on trumpet, Tom Roberts on guitar, and Justin Stanford on percussion. Their music is described by Ian McFarlane as a mix of "1940s jazz, 1950s R&B;, 1970s funk and salsa" and by Maas as, "jazz meets dance." In 1991 Friml was replaced on bass guitar by Thiery Fossemalle. The group broke up in 1993 but reunited in 2016 and in the following year. They released five albums including, Live at Sing Sing (1986), The Energetic Cool (August 1988), Birth of the Fool (March 1990) and The Essentials (1990).

== History ==
Bachelors from Prague were formed in Melbourne in 1985 as an R&B, jazz, and funk band. Their initial line-up was Henry Maas on lead vocals (ex-Busby Berkleys, Buddy Lowenstein Big Band), Bruce Haymes on keyboards (ex-Richard Clapton Band, Russell Morris and the Rubes), Chris Minko on trumpet, Andrew Philipp on saxophone, Jeff Raglus on trumpet (ex-Escalators), Tom Roberts on guitar, Justin Stanford on percussion, George Friml on bass guitar, and Russell Cook on drums. In their early gigs, Vika and Linda Bull would on occasion provide backing vocals for the band. Percussionist Justin Stanford later became manager of the sisters, and married Linda.

Their first album, Live at Sing Sing (1987), was recorded live-in-the-studio in December of the previous year, with David Williams producing. In May 1988 they issued an album, The Energetic Cool, which provided two singles, "Go" (July 1988) and "Tightrope" (February 1989). To promote the album they appeared on SBS-TV and on Nine Networks' Hey Hey It's Saturday. Kathryn Whitfield of The Canberra Times described "Go", "these boys are a little jazzy, a little bluesy and a little like the one-time band The Bureau. Brassy sounds, lots of oomph and plenty to offer."

They toured Europe in 1990, which "proved that there was a market for new original music... [and] convinced the band that setting up base in Europe would be essential." By November 1991 Maas told Ian Watt of The Canberra Times that they were providing "jazz meets dance." He explained how they had "started out playing traditional jazz covers but over the years the band's style has developed into a livelier hip hop style, ideal for live entertainment." By that time the group were a seven-piece with Cook and Minko having left and Friml replaced by Thiery Fossemalle on bass guitar.

In June 1993 they had returned to Australia after playing at the "Edinburgh Festival and sold-out houses in London" while "the success of their last album, Great, broke ground in France and Italy." According to Australian musicologist, Ian McFarlane, they played "a stylish and infectious blend of 1940s jazz, 1950s R&B;, 1970s funk and salsa... [They] never achieved widespread commercial success, but always lived up to its audience's high expectations." The group disbanded in 1993 with Haymes joining Paul Kelly Band in 1994. From 1999 to 2002 he joined Kelly in Professor Ratbaggy.

Bachelors from Prague reunited in September 2016 for a limited run of shows with an eight-piece line-up: Maas, Philipp, Raglus, Haymes, Roberts, Friml, Cook, Stanford. Martin Boulton of The Sydney Morning Herald observed, "the band suited up and blew the roof of Fitzroy Town Hall. Demand to see the original eight-piece jazz, funk and salsa-infused line-up was so strong that two more shows at Maas' other old haunt, The Night Cat, soon sold out." They followed with more shows in October of the next year.

== Members ==
- Henry Maas – vocals (1985–93, 2016, 2017)
- Bruce Haymes – keyboards, piano, backing vocals (1985–93, 2016, 2017)
- Andrew Philipp – saxophone (1985–93, 2016, 2017)
- Jeff Raglus – trumpet, backing vocals (1985–93, 2016, 2017)
- Tom Roberts – guitar (1985–93, 2016, 2017)
- Justin Stanford – percussion, drums (1985–93, 2016, 2017)
- Russell Cook – drums (1985–91, 2016, 2017)
- Chris Minko – trumpet (1985–91)
- George Friml – bass guitar (1985–91, 2016, 2017)
- Thiery Fossemalle – bass guitar (1991–93)

== Discography ==
=== Albums ===
List of studio albums, with selected chart positions
Title	Album details	Peak chart positions
Title	Album details	AUS
The Energetic Cool	Released: 1988; Format: LP, MC, CD; Label: 3333 (DEX 150E)	—
Birth of the Fool	Released: October 1989; Format: LP, MC, CD; Label: Mercury (838 946-1)	61
Great	Released: May 1991; Format: LP, MC, CD; Label: Mercury(848 225-1)	108

=== Live albums ===
List of live albums, with selected details
Title	Album details
Live at Sing Sing	Released: 1987; Format: Label: 3333 (MUSLP 333B)

=== Compilation albums ===
List of compilation albums, with selected details
Title	Album details
The Essentials	Released: 1990; Format: LP, MC, CD; Label: Mercury (846 708-1)

=== Singles ===
- "Go" (1988)
- "Get Smart" (1989) (AUS #118)
- "Tightrope" (1989)
- "Trouble" (1989)
- "Golden Arm" (1990)
- "Doin the Same Thing" (1991) (Aus Independents #2)
- "Great" (1991) - Mercury (AUS #130)
