= Professor Ratbaggy (album) =

Studio album by Professor Ratbaggy
- Released: 18 October 1999
- Genre: Rock; pop; blues
- Length: 46:53
- Label: EMI
- Producer: Andy Baldwin; Professor Ratbaggy

Professor Ratbaggy is the debut album by Australian rock/pop band Professor Ratbaggy and originally released on EMI Records in 1999. "Coma" was released as a single, it was written by band members, Stephen Hadley (bass guitar, backing vocals), Bruce Haymes (keyboards, organ, backing vocals), Paul Kelly (guitar, vocals) and Peter Luscombe (drums) who were all members of Kelly's backing band. "Coma" was remixed by Wicked Beat Sound System.

== Track listing ==
All songs were written by Bruce Haymes, Peter Luscombe, Paul Kelly and Stephen Hadley, except where noted.

1. "Please Myself" – 4:17
2. "White Trash" – 3:58
3. "Can't Fake It" – 5:04
4. "Moni, Make It Good" – 3:47
5. "Coma" – 4:07
6. "Love Letter" (Paul Kelly) – 3:30
7. "Blowfly" – 4:56
8. "See the Birdie" – 3:53
9. "Mannish Woman" – 4:26
10. "Rise and Shine" – 4:15
11. "Oh Death" – 4:40

== Personnel ==
Professor Ratbaggy

- Stephen Hadley – bass guitar, backing vocals
- Bruce Haymes – keyboards, organ, backing vocals
- Paul Kelly – guitar, vocals
- Peter Luscombe – drums

Production details

- Producer – Professor Ratbaggy, Andy Baldwin

== Charts ==
Chart performance for Professor Ratbaggy
Chart (1999)	Peak position
Australian Albums (ARIA)	100
