= Roger Bennett (playwright) =

20th century Indigenous Australian playwright

Roger Bennett (1948–1997) was an Arrernte man from Central Australia, an actor, and a playwright. His best known works are Up the Ladder and Funerals and Circuses.

His works dealt with his life experiences, particularly the travelling boxing tents, where his father, Elley Bennett was a boxing champion during the 1940s and 1950s.

Up the Ladder was first performed at the Adelaide Fringe Festival in 1990, in a production directed by Bob Maza. The play subsequently moved to Melbourne in 1995 for a long stint at the Melbourne Workers Theatre and came to Sydney in 1997 for the Festival of the Dreaming. According to The Sydney Morning Herald,

Up the Ladder takes the audience right inside the spangled, sweaty, tatty and deceptive world of the travelling sideshow carnival, from tawdry fake snake charmers to the sawdust of the boxing ring. [co-director] Enoch says the Aboriginal culture comes through in the play's physicality, mocking humour and the sparse nature of the dialogue. Critics have hailed it as a "feel-good show", "full of fun and good humour".

The fact that the play emphasizes positive aspects of the Aboriginal experience in travelling shows led at least one reviewer to criticize it as apolitical. Wesley Enoch "however argues that any play about Aboriginal people is political", stating that

Having black people on stage punching the shit out of each other is political. But this is not agit prop. I think we are entering into a phase – culturally, artistically, politically – where it is actually about the nuance of racism.

In 2003, the play travelled to Tokyo. Staged by the Rakutendan Theatre Company and directed by Enoch (Ilbijerri Theatre Cooperative), the play used many Japanese actors.

In Funerals and Circuses, first performed at the Adelaide Festival in 1992, Bennett dealt with issues of racism and inter-racial relationships in a small, racially tense town in South Australia. The music of Paul Kelly was used in this production.

Bennett was an actor as well as a playwright. He served as writer-in-residence at the Araluen Centre for Arts and Entertainment in Alice Springs and at Tandanya National Aboriginal Cultural Institute in Adelaide.

== Bibliography ==
- Funerals and Circuses. Currency Press. 1 January 1995. ISBN 978-0-86819-380-9.
- Up the Ladder (1997)
