= Foggy Highway =

Studio album by Paul Kelly and the Stormwater Boys
- Released: 30 May 2005
- Genre: Folk rock
- Length: 43:39
- Label: EMI / Capitol
- Producer: Paul Kelly, Rod McCormack

Paul Kelly and the Stormwater Boys chronology
Ways & Means (2004)	Foggy Highway (2005)	Stolen Apples (2007)

Professional ratings
Review scores
Source	Rating
Allmusic	4/5 stars

Foggy Highway is an album recorded by Paul Kelly and the Stormwater Boys and originally released in May 2005 on EMI in Australia and Capitol Records in the US. It peaked at #6 on the Australian Recording Industry Association (ARIA) End of Year - 2005 Country chart. On 18 October 2005 it was re-released by Cooking Vinyl and included a four track bonus disc. In October 2010, the May 2005 version of Foggy Highway was listed in the book, 100 Best Australian Albums at No. 66, with Paul Kelly and the Coloured Girls' album, Gossip (1986) at No. 7.

The album is similar in nature to Kelly's earlier album Smoke in that the songs were a mixture of new songs in addition to songs Kelly had recorded on previous albums, all performed here in a folk/bluegrass style. The songs to appear on previous albums were "Rally Round the Drum" and "Ghost Town" (appearing on Hidden Things), "Don't Stand So Close to the Window" (appearing on Under the Sun), "Foggy Highway" (appearing on Live, May 1992), and "Cities of Texas" (appearing on So Much Water So Close to Home).

== Track listing ==
All songs were written by Paul Kelly, except where noted.

1. "Stumbling Block" – 4:06
2. "Rally Round the Drum" (Kelly, Archie Roach) – 5:29
3. "Ghost Town" – 3:23
4. "Song of the Old Rake" – 2:48
5. "Don't Stand So Close to the Window" (Kelly, Alex McGregor) – 2:58
6. "Passed Over" – 3:25
7. "They Thought I Was Asleep" – 3:36
8. "You're Learning" (Charlie Louvin, Ira Louvin) – 2:26
9. "Foggy Highway" – 3:03
10. "Down to My Soul" – 3:57
11. "Cities of Texas" – 5:49
12. "Meet Me in the Middle of the Air" – 2:37

=== Limited edition bonus disc ===
1. "Little Boy Don't Lose Your Balls" – 1:59
2. "Rank Stranger" (Albert E. Brumley) – 3:22
3. "Erina Valley Breakout" (Mick Albeck, James Gillard, Paul Kelly, Rod McCormack, Ian Simpson, Trevor Warner) – 2:04
4. "Surely God Is a Lover" (Paul Kelly, John Shaw-Neilson) – 2:25

== Personnel ==
Paul Kelly & the Stormwater Boys

- Paul Kelly - vocals, guitar
- Mick Albeck - fiddle
- James Gillard - double bass
- Rod McCormack - guitars
- Ian Simpson - banjo
- Trevor Warner - mandolin

Tracks 6 and 10

- Jim Fisher - guitar
- Gerry Hale - mandolin
- Fred Kuhnl - double bass
- Nigel McClean - fiddle
- Ian Simpson - banjo

Track 4

- Scott Owen - double bass

Track 8

- Kasey Chambers - vocals

== Credits ==
- Engineered, Mastered and Mixed by Ted Howard
- Engineered by Simon Polinski
- Produced by Paul Kelly and Rod McCormack
- Photography by Ted Howard and Rod McCormack
- Cover by Reg Mombassa

== Charts ==
Chart (2005)	Peak position
Australian Albums (ARIA)	22

== Certifications ==
Region	Certification	Certified units/sales
Australia (ARIA)	Gold	35,000^{^}
^{^} Shipments figures based on certification alone.
