= Roll on Summer =

EP by Paul Kelly
- Released: 28 October 2000
- Studios: The Shed and Sing Sing South Studios
- Genres: Rock; pop
- Length: 12:58
- Label: EMI Music
- Producers: Paul Kelly; Peter Luscombe

Roll on Summer is an EP by Australian musician Paul Kelly and originally released in October 2000. It was released on EMI in Australia. The track "Every Fucking City" was recorded live at The Continental, 25 November 1999. The EP peaked at No. 40 on the ARIA singles chart.

== Track listing ==
All songs were written by Paul Kelly, except where noted.

1. "You're So Fine" (Paul Kelly, Peter Luscombe) – 3:28
2. "Roll on Summer" – 3:13
3. "I Was Hoping You'd Say That" – 2:42
4. "Every Fucking City" – 3:35

== Personnel ==
- Paul Kelly – vocals
- Kirsty Stegwazi – vocals ("Roll on Summer")
- Madeleine Kelly – vocals ("Roll on Summer")
- Memphis Kelly – vocals ("Roll on Summer")

== Charts ==
Chart (2000)	Peak position
Australia (ARIA)	40
