= Bruce Haymes =

Australian musician

- Born: Bruce Geoffrey Haymes; Australia
- Occupation: Musician
- Instruments: keyboards; piano; organ; percussion; vocals; guitar
- Years active: 1976–present

Bruce Geoffrey Haymes is an Australian musician. Since 1976 Haymes has been a member of numerous bands including Avalanche (1978), Richard Clapton Band (1979), Russell Morris and the Rubes (1980–83) and Bachelors from Prague (1985–93). He joined Paul Kelly's Band (1995–97) and was also in Kelly's next group, Professor Ratbaggy (1999–2002). In 1997 he was part of the Singers for the Red Black & Gold, which released a cover version of "Yil Lull" (1998). It was nominated for the ARIA Award for Best Indigenous Release. Along with Kelly, Shane O'Mara and fellow members of Professor Ratbaggy, Haymes performed and co-wrote the soundtrack for the feature film, Lantana (2001). For this work he won the ARIA Award for Best Original Soundtrack Album in 2002.

== Awards and nominations ==
=== ARIA Music Awards ===
The ARIA Music Awards is an annual awards ceremony held by the Australian Recording Industry Association. They commenced in 1987.

Year	Nominee / work	Award	Result	Ref.
2002	Lantana	Best Original Soundtrack	Won	
