= Stardust Five (album) =

Studio album by Stardust Five
- Released: March 27, 2006
- Recorded: Sing Sing South and the Shed Studios; 2005
- Genre: Surf rock
- Labels: EMI Music (Aus); Capitol Records (US)
- Producer: Tchad Blake

Stardust Five is the self-titled debut album by Stardust Five which was released in 2006. The album was mixed and produced by Tchad Blake (Crowded House, Bernard Fanning).

It was released on EMI Music in Australia and Capitol Records in the United States. The first single "Pussy Got Your Tongue" features vocals from Loene Carmen, a singer/songwriter/actress, who has released two solo albums and has collaborated with the likes of the Dirty Three and The Mess Hall. The title of the song was originally the title of a short film by Tania Lacy that was shown at Tropfest in 1997. Lacy also co-wrote the song with the band. Sian Prior who provides additional vocals on "Zoe" and "Los Cucumbros" was also Paul Kelly's then-girlfriend.

== Track listing ==
All tracks written by Paul Kelly, Dan Kelly, Dan Luscombe, Peter Luscombe and Bill MacDonald except where noted.

1. "Last Orders" (instrumental) – 4:20
2. "Nightwatchman" – 4:51
3. "Things We Said in the Dark" – 2:26
4. "Pussy Got Your Tongue" (featuring Loene Carmen) (Tania Lacy, Paul Kelly, Dan Kelly, Dan Luscombe, Peter Luscombe) – 2:46
5. "Mi Camion Mi Casa" – 3:35
6. "Everybody Loves You Baby" – 3:13
7. "Zoe" – 2:27
8. "Road to the North" (Paul Kelly, Dan Luscombe, Peter Luscombe, Bill MacDonald) – 3:18
9. "Lady with Dog" – 3:42
10. "Lovers' Field" – 5:25
11. "Los Cucumbros" – 3:20

== Personnel ==
=== Musicians ===
Credits:

- Loene Carmen — vocals (track 4)
- Ken Gardiner — trumpet (track 5)
- Paul Kelly — vocals/guitars
- Dan Kelly — guitars/vocals
- Peter Luscombe — drums
- Dan Luscombe — guitars/keyboards
- Bill McDonald — bass
- Sian Prior — vocals (tracks 7 & 11)

=== Production ===
- Producer, Sound Mix — Tchad Blake
- Engineer — Daniel Rejmer
- Assistant Engineer — Aaron Cupples

== Releases ==
Format	Country	Label	Catalogue No.	Year
CD	AUS	EMI	816103	2006
CD	US	Capitol	3567452	2006
