= Steve Hadley (musician) =

Australian musician

Stephen Hadley is an Australian musician. Hadley was a member of The Black Sorrows from 1991 to 1993 appearing on the album Better Times (1993). In the mid 90s he joined Paul Kelly's Band and later Professor Ratbaggy. In 1998 he was part of the Singers For The Red Black & Gold who released a cover of "Yil Lull" which was nominated for the ARIA Award for Best Indigenous Release. Along with Paul Kelly, Shane O'Mara and fellow members of Professor Ratbaggy he provided the soundtrack to Lantana. This earned him an ARIA Award for Best Original Soundtrack Album in 2002.

Hadley has also had stints in Joe Creighton Band, Vince Jones Band, Kate Ceberano and The Ministry Of Fun, Christine Anu Band, Men at Work and the Colin Hay Band. Currently, Hadley is a member of Tex Perkins and The Fat Rubber Band.

== Awards and nominations ==
=== ARIA Music Awards ===
The ARIA Music Awards is an annual awards ceremony held by the Australian Recording Industry Association. They commenced in 1987.

Year	Nominee / work	Award	Result	Ref.
2002	Lantana	Best Original Soundtrack	Won	
