= The Kevins =

Australian pop music band

- Origin: Melbourne, Australia
- Genres: Pop
- Years active: 1978-1983
- Labels: White/Mushroom/Festival
- Past members: Sally Ford; Anne Harkin; Nick Smith; Steve "Buzz" Leeson; Carl Signet; Michael Davis; David Hicks

The Kevins were an Australian pop music band formed in 1978. Founding mainstays were Sally Ford on saxophone, Anne Harkin on guitar and vocals, Steve "Buzz" Leeson on bass guitar and vocals and Nick Smith on vocals and guitar. They issued an extended play, Club of Rome (1982), with its lead single "Romeo Romeo", which peaked at number 70 on the Kent Music Report singles chart.

== History ==
The Kevins were formed as a pop music band in 1978 in Melbourne by Sally Ford on saxophone, Anne Harkin on guitar and vocals, Steve "Buzz" Leeson on bass guitar and backing vocals and Nick Smith on lead vocals and guitar and Michael Davis on drums. Ford and Harkins had been members of an all-girl band, Flying Tackle, while Leeson and Smith were from a "sophisticated rock" group, Millionaires. Their debut single, "And so We Meet" (September 1979), was described by Australian musicologist Ian McFarlane as combining "pop, soul and funk with a large dose of good humour". It was co-written by Ford and Leeson.

The Kevins continued performing for two years without further recorded output until they issued another single, "Romeo Romeo", in August 1982, which was co-written by Ford and Leeson, again. It reached the top 100 on the Kent Music Report singles chart. By that time Davis had been replaced on drums by former Millionaires bandmate David Hicks. Their five-track, debut extended play, Club of Rome (1982), was produced by Martin Armiger for White/Mushroom/Festival.

The group's final single, "Ululation (Here It Comes Again)" (September 1983), did not reach the top 100 and the group disbanded soon after. "Romeo Romeo" was used on ABC-TV's series, Sweet and Sour (1984). Ford and Leeson also wrote "No Focus" for the soundtrack, which was released as its third single.

== Discography ==
=== Extended Play ===
Title	Album details
Club of Rome	Released: 1982; Format: LP; Label: White Label Records (L-20015)

=== Singles ===
Year	Title	Peak chart positions	Album
Year	Title	AUS	Album
1979	"And So We Meet"	-	—
1982	"Romeo Romeo"	70	Club of Rome
1983	"Ululation (Here It Comes Again)"	-	Club of Rome
