= Stardust Five =

Pop-rock band from Melbourne

- Origin: Melbourne, Victoria, Australia
- Genres: Surf rock, pop
- Years active: 2005–?
- Labels: EMI Australia; Capitol Records
- Members: Paul Kelly; Dan Kelly; Peter Luscombe; Dan Luscombe; Bill MacDonald
- Website: Official website

Stardust Five are a former Australian five-piece surf rock and pop band formed in Melbourne in 2005. The members of the band were Dan Kelly, Paul Kelly, Dan Luscombe, Peter Luscombe, and Bill MacDonald.

== Background ==
The various members of Stardust Five have played in other bands, including The Last Gasp, Dan Kelly and the Alpha Males, Max Q, The Blackeyed Susans, and Michelle Shocked.

A number of their recordings were prompted by different requests for film and TV soundtrack submissions. This gave Stardust Five its underlining theme – songs with a visually evocative feeling.

== Personnel ==
The band members are:

- Paul Kelly – guitar, vocals
- Dan Kelly - guitar
- Peter Luscombe – drums
- Dan Luscombe - guitar, keyboards, vocals
- Bill MacDonald - bass

== Discography ==
=== Albums ===
- Stardust Five – March 2006

=== Singles ===
- "Pussy got your Tongue" - 2006
