= Professor Ratbaggy =

- Origin: Melbourne, Victoria, Australia
- Genres: Dub, funk, R&B
- Years active: 1999–present
- Label: EMI Australia
- Members: Steve Hadley; Bruce Haymes; Paul Kelly; Peter Luscombe

Professor Ratbaggy is an Australian four-piece band based from Melbourne. Sometimes thought of as a side-project of iconic Australian singer-songwriter Paul Kelly, the band is in fact its own entity: Kelly is one of the four members (song writing generally shared).

The band's name is derived from the Australian TV character "Professor Ratbaggy", who was a bumbling but kind-hearted scientist, performed by Ernie Carroll on children's programs for Melbourne television station GTV-9 between 1958 and 1968.

Steve Hadley, Bruce Haymes and Peter Luscombe would frequently play as The Casuals, as well as being members of Kelly's regular band.

Professor Ratbaggy's songs are often instrumental and purely groove-based with reggae, dub and funk influences.

Professor Ratbaggy members and Shane O'Mara provided the original music for Lantana (2001) and are featured on the EMI soundtrack of the same name. The band's song, "Love Letter" (from their self-titled 1999 album) was used on ABC-TV series Fireflies (2004) together with songs by Paul Kelly (alone and with other bands) and by other artists.

With Kelly often busy with his solo career and work in film and TV composition, Professor Ratbaggy's live shows have all but ceased and their recorded output remains low; this is not to say that the concept has died and there remains a strong possibility of further playing and/or recording.

== Personnel ==
- Steve Hadley – bass, backing vocals
- Bruce Haymes – keyboards, organ, backing vocals
- Paul Kelly – guitar, vocals
- Peter Luscombe – drums

== Discography ==
=== Studio albums ===
List of studio albums, with selected chart positions
Title	Details	Peak chart positions
Title	Details	AUS
Professor Ratbaggy	Released: October 1999; Label: EMI; Format: CD	100

=== Soundtrack albums ===
- Lantana (2001)

=== EP ===
- Coma (1999)
