= Peter Luscombe =

Australian drummer and composer

- Born: Peter John Luscombe; Australia
- Genres: Rock; film score
- Occupations: Musician, composer

Peter Luscombe is an Australian drummer and composer.

== Career ==
Luscombe was a member of The Black Sorrows from 1985 to 1993 appearing on the albums A Place in the World (1986), Dear Children (1987), Hold on to Me (1988), Harley and Rose (1990), Better Times (1993).

He worked with Stephen Cummings as a member of Stephen Cummings' Lovetown, and the Stephen Cummings Band. He joined Rebecca's Empire which was formed by Rebecca Barnard and Shane O'Mara (both also part of Cummings' backing bands). They released two albums, Way of All Things (1996) and Welcome (1999) before breaking up in 2000.

In the mid '90s he joined Paul Kelly's Band and later Professor Ratbaggy and Stardust Five. In 1998 he was part of the Singers For The Red Black & Gold who released a cover of "Yil Lull" which was nominated for the ARIA Award for Best Indigenous Release. Along with Paul Kelly, Shane O'Mara and fellow members of Professor Ratbaggy he provided the soundtrack to Lantana. This earned him an ARIA Award for Best Original Soundtrack Album in 2002.

From 2005 to 2016, and currently, he is the drummer and singer for the RocKwiz Orkestra, the house band for TV music quiz show, RocKwiz. He appeared on their 2011 The RocKwiz Christmas Album which was nominated for an ARIA Award for Best Original Soundtrack, Cast or Show Album in 2012.

His younger brother Dan Luscombe is also a musician. The two brothers were both members of Paul Kelly and the Boon Companions.

== Awards and nominations ==
=== ARIA Music Awards ===
The ARIA Music Awards is an annual awards ceremony held by the Australian Recording Industry Association. They commenced in 1987.

| Year | Nominee / work | Award | Result | Ref. |
|---|---|---|---|---|
| 2002 | Lantana | Best Original Soundtrack | Won | |
