= Songs from the South =

Greatest hits album by Paul Kelly
- Released: 13 May 1997
- Recorded: 1985–1997
- Genre: Australian rock
- Label: Mushroom/White

Paul Kelly chronology
Live at the Continental and the Esplanade (1996)	Songs from the South (1997)	Words and Music (1998)

Professional ratings
Review scores
Source	Rating
Allmusic	4.5/5 stars
Artist Direct	4.5/5 stars

Songs from the South, subtitled Paul Kelly's Greatest Hits, is a greatest hits album by Australian singer-songwriter Paul Kelly. It was released on 13 May 1997 by Mushroom Records. The album peaked at No. 2 on the Australian Recording Industry Association Albums Chart. It was certified 7× platinum by 2017.

The songs are drawn from Kelly's previously released albums issued between 1985 and 1996. Two tracks on the album are exclusive to this release: a live recording of "Everything's Turning to White", and a newly-recorded acoustic version of "When I First Met Your Ma". Kelly later released similarly titled compilation albums, Songs from the South Volume 2 (Paul Kelly 98–08) (November 2008) and Songs from the South: 1985–2019 (November 2019).

== Track listing ==
All tracks are written by Paul Kelly, unless otherwise noted.

Songs from the South: Paul Kelly's Greatest Hits
No.	Title	Album	Length
1.	"From St Kilda to Kings Cross"	Post (1985)	2:54
2.	"Leaps and Bounds" (Kelly, Chris Langman)	Gossip (1986)	3:24
3.	"Before Too Long"	Gossip (1986)	3:22
4.	"Darling It Hurts" (Kelly, Steve Connolly)	Gossip (1986)	3:16
5.	"Look So Fine, Feel So Low" (Kelly, Maurice Frawley)	Gossip (1986)	3:00
6.	"Dumb Things"	Under the Sun (1987)	2:29
7.	"To Her Door"	Under the Sun (1987)	3:16
8.	"Bradman"	Under the Sun (1987)	7:25
9.	"Everything's Turning to White"	Recorded Live at the Museum of Contemporary Art, for the Australian Broadcasting Corporation's Sunday program concert (1996)	4:38
10.	"Sweet Guy"	So Much Water So Close To Home (1989)	3:29
11.	"Careless"	So Much Water So Close to Home (1989)	2:50
12.	"Wintercoat"	Comedy (1991)	3:19
13.	"From Little Things Big Things Grow" (Kelly, Kev Carmody)	Comedy (1991)	6:51
14.	"When I First Met Your Ma"	1997 Re-recorded, previously unreleased acoustic version, original version appears on Hidden Things (1992)	4:45
15.	"Pouring Petrol on a Burning Man"	Hidden Things (1992), previously released as a single in 1990	2:54
16.	"Love Never Runs on Time"	Wanted Man (1994)	2:58
17.	"Song from the Sixteenth Floor" (Kelly, John Clifforth)	Wanted Man (1994)	3:47
18.	"Deeper Water" (Kelly, Randy Jacobs)	Deeper Water (1995)	4:26
19.	"Give In to My Love"	Deeper Water (1995)	3:56
20.	"How to Make Gravy"	How to Make Gravy (EP, 1996)	4:26

== Charts ==
=== Weekly charts ===
Chart (1997)	Peak position
Australian Albums (ARIA)	2
New Zealand Albums (RMNZ)	17

=== Year-end charts ===
Chart (1997)	Peak position
Australian (ARIA)	10
Chart (1998)	Peak position
Australian (ARIA)	68

== Certifications ==
Region	Certification	Certified units/sales
Australia (ARIA)	7× Platinum	490,000^{^}
^{^} Shipments figures based on certification alone.
