= Goin' Your Way =

Live album by Neil Finn and Paul Kelly
- Released: 8 November 2013
- Recorded: 10 March 2013
- Venue: Sydney Opera House Concert Hall
- Genre: Pop rock
- Length: 119:58
- Label: EMI Australia
- Director: Paul Goldman
- Producer: Pete Henderson

Neil Finn chronology
The Sun Came Out (2009)	Goin' Your Way (2013)	Dizzy Heights (2014)

Paul Kelly chronology
Conversations with Ghosts (2013)	Goin' Your Way (2013)	The Merri Soul Sessions (2014)

Goin' Your Way is a live album collaboration recorded by Neil Finn and Paul Kelly during a performance at the Sydney Opera House on 10 March 2013. It was released on 8 November as a stand-alone 2× CD, Blu-ray or DVD; or in a Limited Edition Deluxe version with all three formats. From 18 February to 18 March, Finn and Kelly undertook a joint tour of Australia, they performed tracks from their respective careers, including re-interpreting each other's work. The CD album peaked at No. 5 on the ARIA Albums Chart while the DVD reached No. 1 on the related Music DVD Chart.

== Background ==
Goin' Your Way was recorded on 10 March 2013 at the Sydney Opera House by Neil Finn and Paul Kelly. Both artists have a long association. Back in 1980 Finn, as a member of New Zealand band Split Enz, and Kelly, as the leader of Paul Kelly and the Dots, were both signed with Mushroom Records. In October 1984 TV music series Rock Arena, hosted by Suzanne Dowling, broadcast Kelly's group performing "Billy Baxter" while Split Enz provided "I Got You".

In 1987 Kelly and his band The Messengers opened for Finn's next group, Crowded House, on the initial dates of that group's United States tour. Kelly and The Messengers then headlined their own US tour. Finn provided backing vocals on "Hey Boys", a duo single by Mark Seymour (of Hunters & Collectors) and Kelly, which was released in May 1992. In 1993 Finn and Kelly had started discussions about a collaborative tour over a social game of tennis – both were living in St Kilda.

By 1998 Crowded House had disbanded and former members Finn, Paul Hester and Nick Seymour (Mark's brother) shared a stage, on an episode of TV series Hessie's Shed. Finn and the show's host, Hester, performed "Not the Girl You Think You Are" with Largest Living Things – the show band, before being joined by Seymour for "Sister Madly" and a version of Kelly's "Leaps and Bounds", which also featured Kelly on vocals. In November 2010 Kelly and folk musician Angus Stone covered a Crowded House track, "Four Seasons in One Day", for a tribute album, He Will Have His Way – it was co-written by Neil with his brother Tim Finn (ex-Split Enz, Crowded House). In April 2011 Neil Finn and Kelly co-headlined a show at Red Hill Auditorium in Perth; it was the first music concert at the new venue.

=== Collaborative tour ===
In November 2012 after further discussions about collaborating for a tour, Finn and Kelly announced the first ten dates of their Australia-wide Goin' Your Way Tour for February and March in the following year. Kelly told a press conference that "I sent Neil a list of his songs I wanted us to do, he sent me a list, the same for me. We also went through tracks songs we could do good harmony singing on". They also indicated the support act for those dates would be Lisa Mitchell. The tour was organised by Finn and Kelly with Live Nation Australasia by arrangement with Artist Voice. By January 2013 additional dates had been added to the tour without Mitchell supporting.

Finn and Kelly used a backing band of Kelly's nephew, Dan Kelly on guitar, Finn's son Elroy on drums, and Zoe Hauptmann on bass guitar. They started their 20-date tour on 18 February at Melbourne's Palais Theatre and finished at the Sydney Opera House Concert Hall on 18 March – their fifth performance at that venue. The final show was streamed internationally via YouTube as Neil Finn and Paul Kelly Live at Sydney Opera House. One of the final tracks performed at each gig was a cover version of Henry Mancini's "Moon River" with the chorus "Oh, dream maker, you heart breaker / Wherever you're goin', I'm goin' your way". The last phrase provided the album's title.

Jon Jobbagy of The AU Review caught their first performance at the Sydney Opera House and noted the stage backdrop was designed by Noel Crombie (ex-Split Enz) and Sally Mill. Jobbagy felt that Finn was the "most versatile musician of the pair" and "their repertoire is colossal so it was basically hit after hit". On 29 July 2013 at the 13th Helpmann Awards Finn and Kelly won the Best Australian Contemporary Concert category for the tour. At the ARIA Music Awards of 2013 they were nominated for Best Australian Live Act.

== Critical reception ==
Professional ratings
Review scores
Source	Rating
The AU Review	(9.1/10)
The Australian	4.5/5 stars
BMA Magazine	4.5/5 stars
The New Zealand Herald	4/5 stars
News Limited	5/5 stars
Renowned for Sound	3.5/5 stars
The Sydney Morning Herald	4.5/5 stars

Sean Palmer of The Sydney Morning Herald felt the album allowed one to "enjoy these musical stalwarts jamming together". He compared Kelly's "country-tinged voice" with Finn's "blend of Lennon and McCartney at their grandest", while "[t]ogether on stage, they are magic". The AU Review's Justine McNamara was impressed by the "quality of the recording" where "both singers' voices are perfect". Rachael McArthur of Renowned for Sound was disappointed by the band "[t]here is a bad kind of looseness. It feels as though the band has not perhaps had a huge amount of time to learn the 29 songs required"; and Finn's "piano work is at times a bit off". Nevertheless, McArthur "did like the album and enjoyed listening to songs that have become so deeply ingrained in Australian culture".

== Commercial performance ==
In the week ending 24 November 2013 Goin' Your Way 2× CD album debuted at No. 5 on the ARIA Albums Chart. Meanwhile, the DVD version reached No. 1 on the related Music DVD Chart that same week.

== Track listing ==
Goin' Your Way – disc one
No.	Title	Writer(s)	Length
1.	"Don't Stand So Close to the Window"	P. Kelly, A. McGregor	2:52
2.	"Four Seasons in One Day"	N. Finn, T. Finn	3:48
3.	"Before Too Long"	P. Kelly	3:32
4.	"She Will Have Her Way"	N. Finn	5:24
5.	"Not the Girl You Think You Are"	N. Finn	4:35
6.	"For the Ages"	P. Kelly, D. Kelly	4:17
7.	"Sinner"	N. Finn, M. de Vries	5:06
8.	"Won't Give In"	N. Finn, T. Finn	4:41
9.	"Careless"	P. Kelly	3:48
10.	"Leaps and Bounds"	P. Kelly, C. Langham	3:37
11.	"Only Talking Sense"	T. Finn, N. Finn	3:03
12.	"New Found Year"	P. Kelly, D. Kelly	3:39
13.	"Into Temptation"	N. Finn	5:03
14.	"You Can Put Your Shoes Under My Bed"	P. Kelly	4:48
15.	"Private Universe"	N. Finn	4:05

Goin' Your Way – disc two
No.	Title	Writer(s)	Length
1.	"Dumb Things"	P. Kelly	2:55
2.	"One Step Ahead"	N. Finn	3:38
3.	"Deeper Water"	P. Kelly, R. Jacobs	5:21
4.	"Better Be Home Soon"	N. Finn	3:30
5.	"How to Make Gravy"	P. Kelly	5:43
6.	"Distant Sun"	N. Finn	4:31
7.	"Winter Coat"	P. Kelly	4:17
8.	"Fall at Your Feet"	N. Finn	3:34
9.	"To Her Door"	P. Kelly	3:34
10.	"Don't Dream It's Over"	N. Finn	4:31
11.	"Message to My Girl"	N. Finn	5:03
12.	"Love is the Law"	P. Kelly	5:18
13.	"Words of Love"	B. Holly	2:19
14.	"Moon River"	H. Mancini	3:26

Goin' Your Way – DVD, BD
No.	Title	Writer(s)	Length
1.	"Introduction"	N. Finn, P. Kelly
2.	"Before Too Long"	P. Kelly	3:32
3.	"She Will Have Her Way"	N. Finn	5:24
4.	"For the Ages"	P. Kelly, D. Kelly	4:17
5.	"Not the Girl You Think You Are"	N. Finn	4:35
6.	"Sinner"	N. Finn, M. de Vries	5:06
7.	"Careless"	P. Kelly	3:48
8.	"Leaps and Bounds"	P. Kelly, C. Langham	3:37
9.	"Won't Give In"	N. Finn, T. Finn	4:41
10.	"Into Temptation"	N. Finn	5:03
11.	"You Can Put Your Shoes Under My Bed"	P. Kelly	4:48
12.	"Private Universe"	N. Finn	4:05
13.	"One Step Ahead"	N. Finn	3:38
14.	"Dumb Things"	P. Kelly	2:55
15.	"Deeper Water"	P. Kelly, R. Jacobs	5:21
16.	"Better Be Home Soon"	N. Finn	3:30
17.	"How to Make Gravy"	P. Kelly	5:43
18.	"Distant Sun"	N. Finn	4:31
19.	"Winter Coat"	P. Kelly	4:17
20.	"Fall at Your Feet"	N. Finn	3:34
21.	"Love is the Law"	P. Kelly	5:18
22.	"Message to My Girl"	N. Finn	5:03
23.	"To Her Door"	P. Kelly	3:34
24.	"Don't Dream It's Over"	N. Finn	4:31
25.	"Moon River"	H. Mancini	3:26
26.	"Words of Love"	B. Holly	2:19
27.	"Orientation Day"	N. Finn, P. Kelly
Total length:			114:00

== Personnel ==
=== Musicians ===
- Neil Finn – vocals, piano, acoustic guitar
- Paul Kelly – vocals, acoustic guitar, harmonica
- Elroy Finn – drums
- Zoe Hauptmann – bass guitar, double bass
- Dan Kelly – guitar

=== Production ===
- Pete Henderson – producer, engineer
- Leon Zervos – mastering at Studios 301, Sydney
- Bob Clearmountain – mixer
- Jason Blackwell – recording engineer, web stream audio director
- Paul Goldman – visual direction

== Charts and certifications ==
=== Weekly charts ===
Chart (2013–14)	Peak position
Australian Albums (ARIA)	5
Australian Music DVD (ARIA)	1

=== Year-end charts ===
Chart (2013)	Position
Australian Albums (ARIA)	88
Chart (2014)	Position
Australian Albums (ARIA)	79

=== Certifications ===
Region	Certification	Certified units/sales
Australia (ARIA) album	Gold	35,000^{^}
Australia (ARIA) DVD	Platinum	15,000^{^}
^{^} Shipments figures based on certification alone.
