= The A to Z Recordings =

Live album by Paul Kelly
- Released: 24 September 2010
- Recorded: 2004–2010
- Genre: Australian Rock
- Length: 378:00
- Labels: Gawd Aggie, Universal
- Producer: Paul Kelly

Paul Kelly chronology
Songs from the South Volume 2 (2008)	The A to Z Recordings (2010)	Spring and Fall (2012)

The A to Z Recordings is an eight-volume live album by Australian rock musician, Paul Kelly, which was released on 24 September 2010 on Gawd Aggie Records in Australia and Universal Import in North America. It had been recorded from a series of performances from 2004 to 2010 on Kelly's A to Z Tours in various locations. The tours led to Kelly writing his memoir, How to Make Gravy (named for the song of the same name), also in September 2010. Kelly's A to Z Tours continued until March 2012. Rolling Stone's Jason Cohen described the release as "a 106-track, eight-CD boxed set culled from Kelly's now-trademark A to Z live performances" and, with the associated memoir, Kelly "might be creating the world's longest CD liner notes" at 568 pages.

== Background ==
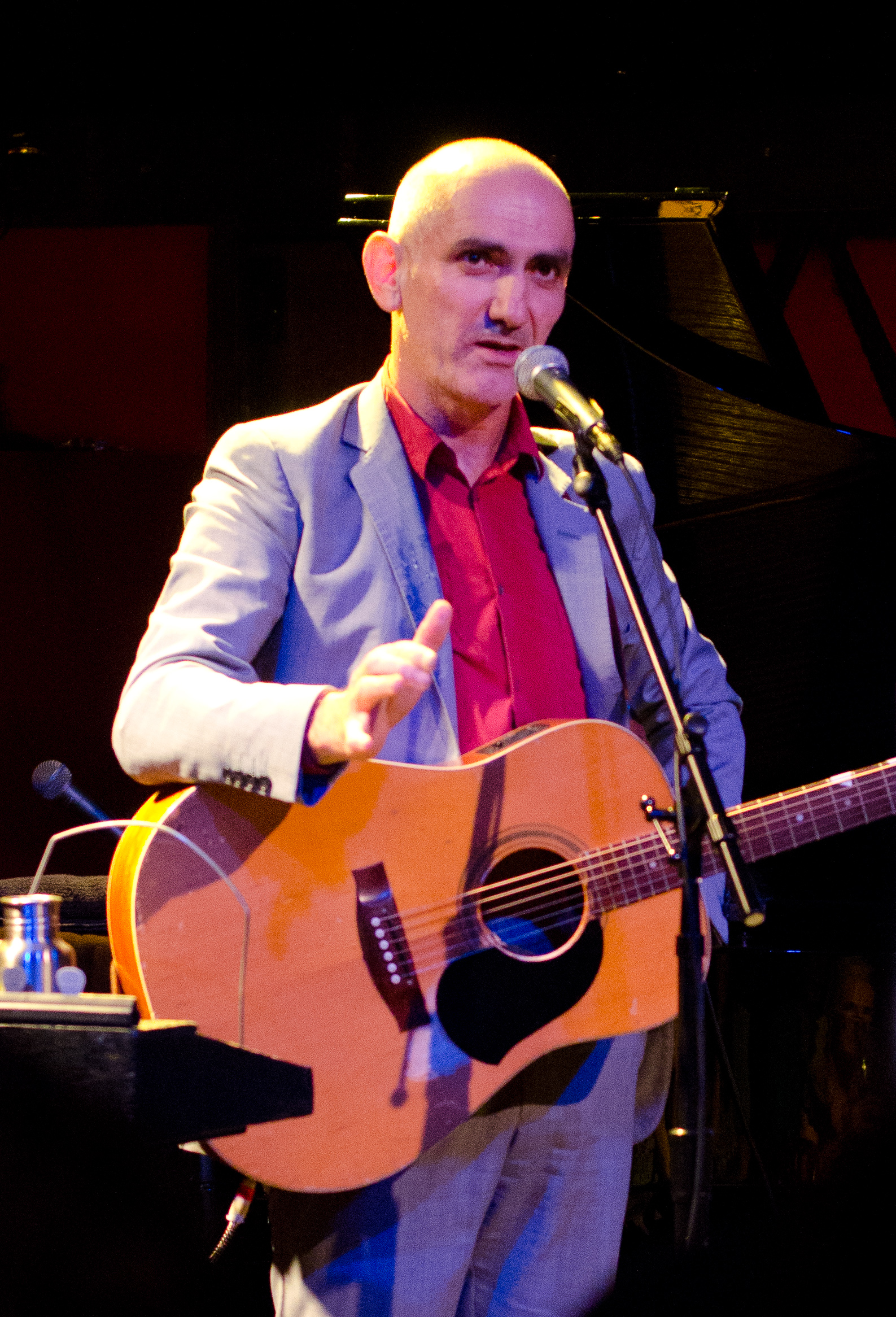
Kelly performing "The A to Z Shows" in New York City, September 2011. Rolling Stone's David Fricke was at the performance, "a live alphabetical retrospective of Kelly's life's work as Australia's Bob Dylan and Elvis Costello combined, in narrative candor, trap-door wit and devotion to rock's country, folk and blues roots".

The A to Z Recordings originate from a series of acoustic concerts by Australian rock musician, Paul Kelly starting in December 2004 with 100 songs performed alphabetically over four nights at The Famous Spiegeltent in Melbourne. In November–December 2006 Kelly undertook his A to Z Tour at the Brisbane Powerhouse, Melbourne's Spiegeltent, and at the Sydney Opera House. On his A to Z Tours, over subsequent years to 2010, Kelly was often accompanied by his nephew, Dan Kelly, on guitar and vocals and sometimes by his then-girlfriend, Sian Prior, on clarinet and vocals. For some of his North American shows, he cut back his performance to only one or two nights, "the speed-dial version". Kelly would provide anecdotes or background for each song, which led to his writing a memoir, How to Make Gravy (named for the song of the same name), issued in September 2010. The book contains a chapter per song with the lyrics supplied followed by Kelly's description of varied topics. According to Rolling Stone's Jason Cohen, Kelly "might be creating the world's longest CD liner notes" at 568 pages. It was released in "tandem with The A to Z Recordings, a 106-track, eight-CD boxed set culled from Kelly's now-trademark A to Z live performances". The boxed set was issued on 24 September 2010 by Gawd Aggie Records in Australia and Universal Import in North America. In October that year, the book and boxed set were packaged together and issued as How to Make Gravy: The A to Z Recordings.

In January 2011 The Sydney Morning Herald's Bernard Zuel caught the first two nights of a four night set, he disputed the "accepted wisdom that acoustic performances were the test of a song's lasting quality" and preferred when Kelly's nephew Dan "add[ed] colour guitar or extra vocals to particular songs" or when Prior "provided scattered 'furnishings', playing clarinet, briefly bringing some operatic vocals to the party and noticeably brightening proceedings". Zuel felt the first night was "lacking some energy, vocal and physical" and that "the show's highlights came in the purely solo songs about or from the perspective of women". Kelly's A to Z Tours continued until March 2012.

== Composition and recording ==
In November 2011, The A to Z Recordings were featured in two parts on The Weekend Planet program on Radio National (Australian Broadcasting Corporation) with Doug Spencer presenting tracks "beside another artist's utterly different (often, wordless) take on the same subject, or closely related theme". Spencer described some of the collection's tracks: "Adelaide" is a "21st century 'live' version of a song Paul wrote early in the 1980s, when his former home-city was a fresher 'wound'". For the song Kelly "sings and strums acoustic guitar, with nephew Dan Kelly's electric guitar". "Cities of Texas" is "spare – Paul's voice, [acoustic] guitar and harmonica – in the persona of the wind". Kelly's inspirations are seeing Dallas from the front of a tour bus in 1987 and reading Percy Bysshe Shelley's sonnet Ozymandias. "Don't Explain" is "a deliciously wry song, in persona of an older woman, brushing off her 'toy boy'. Kelly, solo – voice and [acoustic] guitar". It was written as an answer song to Billie Holiday's 1946 track of the same name. "Lately" is "as close to 'croon-ville' as Paul Kelly gets", and is partly inspired by Frank Sinatra's songbook. Kelly's singing and chordal acoustic guitar, is joined by Sian Prior's clarinet. "If I Could Just Start Today Again" is regarded by Kelly "as his 'most precise', most perfectly proportioned song. He says he has no idea how he wrote it, 'without thought or struggle'". For the track he sings and fingerpicks his guitar. On "I Can't Believe We Were Married" he is joined by Dan on harmony vocal. Spencer finds "Dumb Things" is a "very exuberant version, 'live' with [Kelly's] vocal and whooping and [acoustic] guitar, with [Dan] playing up a storm on ripe [electric] guitar".

The second program showcased "Winter Coat" which Spencer declared was "a superbly written, bittersweet song, in which the coat lives on, long after the departure of the lover who bought it for him" with Kelly playing solo. While "You Can Put Your Shoes Under My Bed" addresses "a somewhat errant longtime friend/ former flame" with Kelly providing vocals, piano and harmonica. His rendition of "Maralinga (Rainy Land)" is a "[v]ery good performance of an extraordinary song. It adopts the personae of two of the (many) indigenous Australians who were irradiated when Britain dropped atomic bombs into South Australia's desert country in 1957 and 1958". Kelly is joined by Dan on electric guitar and backing vocals. "Shane Warne" is perceived as a "nicely silly calypso-cricket song about Shane Warne. [Prior] plays the clarinet. [Kelly] borrowed the tune from Lord Kitchener's "London is the Place for Me". "Smoke Under the Bridge" tells the story of its protagonist, 'Banjo' Clark, "a young black man in mid-century rural Australia ... [who, later] was well-known, widely respected and much loved". It was delivered as an "intimate, quiet song, performed solo". "Meet Me in the Middle of the Air" was performed a capella with the title "common to various blues, gospel and spiritual songs. The other words come from Psalm 23". "My Way Is to You" is a "[v]ery haunting song and performance. Kelly sings and plays acoustic guitar. Nephew and co-author Dan plays atmospheric electric guitar. The lyric is – by design – equally open to 'entirely secular' and to 'sacred' interpretations". "Other People's Houses" has the lyrics spoken instead of sung – except the choruses. Spencer feels it is "[b]eautifully written, eventually blurring the 'he' and the 'I' and the 'child, then' and the 'adult, now', still haunted thirty years later".

In a 2002 interview with Debbie Kruger, Kelly indicated that the song, "To Her Door" (1987) took seven years to write. Kelly uses the same protagonist in "Love Never Runs on Time" from 1994's Wanted Man and then in 1996's "How to Make Gravy" from the extended play of the same name. All three tracks appear on The A to Z Recordings.

== Track listing ==
All tracks are written by Paul Kelly except as shown.

CD 1 Night 1 Act 1
No.	Title	Length
1.	"Adelaide"	3:47
2.	"After the Show"	3:04
3.	"Anastasia Changes Her Mind"	2:33
4.	"Be Careful What You Pray For"	2:54
5.	"Beautiful Promise"	3:02
6.	"Before Too Long"	3:42
7.	"Beggar on the Street of Love"	3:14
8.	"Behind the Bowler's Arm"	3:00
9.	"Big Fine Girl"	2:39
10.	"Blues for Skip"	3:17
11.	"Bradman"	7:10
12.	"The Cake and the Candle"	3:22
13.	"Careless"	3:44
14.	"Change Your Mind"	3:48
15.	"Charlie Owen's Slide Guitar"	3:28
16.	"Cities of Texas"	3:51
Total length:		56:35

CD 2 Night 1 Act 2
No.	Title	Length
1.	"Coma"	3:12
2.	"Cradle of Love"	2:50
3.	"Deeper Water"	4:35
4.	"Desdemona"	4:03
5.	"Difficult Woman"	3:49
6.	"Don't Explain"	3:01
7.	"Don't Harm the Messenger"	3:56
8.	"Don't Stand so Close to the Window"	2:56
9.	"Don't Start Me Talking"	2:59
10.	"Down to My Soul"	2:55
11.	"Dumb Things"	3:13
12.	"Emotional"	4:56
13.	"Every Fucking City"	3:52
14.	"Everybody Wants to Touch Me"	2:56
15.	"Everything's Turning to White"	4:49
Total length:		54:02

CD 3 Night 2 Act 1
No.	Title	Writer(s)	Length
1.	"The Foggy Fields of France"		3:53
2.	"Foggy Highway"		3:28
3.	"Forty Miles to Saturday Night"		2:21
4.	"Forty-Eight Angels"		3:58
5.	"From Little Things Big Things Grow"	Paul Kelly, Kev Carmody	6:36
6.	"From St Kilda to Kings Cross"		3:33
7.	"Gathering Storm"		2:36
8.	"God Told Me To"		3:30
9.	"The Gift that Keeps on Giving"		3:31
10.	"Glory Be to God"		3:09
11.	"Going About My Father's Business"		2:48
12.	"How to Make Gravy"		5:40
Total length:			45:03

CD 4 Night 2 Act 2
No.	Title	Writer(s)	Length
1.	"I Can't Believe We Were Married"		2:56
2.	"I Close My Eyes and Think of You"		4:06
3.	"I Don't Know Anything Anymore"		2:10
4.	"I Keep on Coming Back for More"		4:00
5.	"I'd Rather Go Blind"		3:07
6.	"If I Could Start Today Again"		2:46
7.	"I Wasted Time"		2:38
8.	"I Won't Be Your Dog"		5:09
9.	"Jandamarra/Pigeon"		2:10
10.	"Jump to Love"		2:39
11.	"Just About to Break"		3:10
12.	"King of Fools"		2:30
13.	"Lately"		3:32
14.	"Leaps and Bounds"	Paul Kelly, Chris Langman	3:23
Total length:			44:16

CD 5 Night 3 Act 1
No.	Title	Writer(s)	Length
1.	"Little Boy, Don't Lose Your Balls"		2:09
2.	"Love Is the Law"		3:58
3.	"Love Never Runs on Time"		3:06
4.	"Luck"		3:36
5.	"Maralinga (Rainy Land)"		3:59
6.	"Meet Me in the Middle of the Air"		2:08
7.	"Midnight Rain"		4:23
8.	"My Way Is to You"	Paul Kelly, Dan Kelly	4:22
9.	"No You"		4:14
10.	"Nothing but a Dream"		3:52
11.	"The Oldest Story in the Book"		4:21
12.	"One More Tune"		4:14
13.	"Other People's Houses"		3:32
Total length:			51:05

CD 6 Night 3 Act 2
No.	Title	Writer(s)	Length
1.	"Our Sunshine"	Paul Kelly, Michael Thomas	3:51
2.	"Please Myself"		2:45
3.	"Pretty Place"		4:14
4.	"The Ballad of Queenie and Rover"		3:36
5.	"Rally Round the Drum"	Paul Kelly, Archie Roach	4:41
6.	"Randwick Bells"		4:19
7.	"Saturday Night and Sunday Morning"		2:58
8.	"Shane Warne"	Paul Kelly, Aldwyn Roberts, Denis Preston, Edmundo Ros	3:37
9.	"Smoke Under the Bridge"		4:16
10.	"Somebody's Forgetting Somebody"		3:40
11.	"Somewhere in the City"		3:37
12.	"South of Germany"		2:37
Total length:			43:33

CD 7 Night 4 Act 1
No.	Title	Length
1.	"Standing on the Street of Early Sorrows"	4:57
2.	"Stolen Apples"	3:53
3.	"Stories of Me"	2:53
4.	"Stupid Song"	3:37
5.	"Summer Rain"	3:01
6.	"Sweet Guy"	4:20
7.	"Sydney from a 747"	3:06
8.	"They Thought I Was Asleep"	3:30
9.	"Thoughts in the Middle of the Night"	5:11
10.	"To Her Door"	3:37
11.	"Until Death Do Them Part"	3:04
Total length:		41:09

CD 8 Night 4 Act 2
No.	Title	Length
1.	"When I First Met Your Ma"	4:42
2.	"Winter Coat"	4:12
3.	"Won't You Come Around?"	2:53
4.	"Would You Be My Friend?"	2:56
5.	"You Broke a Beautiful Thing"	4:51
6.	"You Can Put Your Shoes Under My Bed"	3:55
7.	"You Can't Take It with You"	3:07
8.	"Your Little Sister Is a Big Girl Now"	3:14
9.	"Young Lovers"	3:19
10.	"You're 39, You're Beautiful and You're Mine"	2:48
11.	"Your Loving Is on My Mind"	3:26
12.	"Zoe"	2:54
Total length:		42:17

- The A to Z Recordings parallels Kelly's memoir, How to Make Gravy, however, "[t]wo songs, 'This Land Is Mine' and 'Treaty' are not included in the box set as they defy stripped-back reworking".

== Personnel ==
Musicians

- Paul Kelly – acoustic guitar, harmonica, lead vocals, piano
- Dan Kelly – electric guitar, vocals, ukulele
- Sian Prior – clarinet, vocals (on six tracks)

Production details

- Paul Kelly – producer

== Charts ==
Chart performance for The A to Z Recordings
Chart (2010)	Peak position
Australian Albums (ARIA)	118
