= Before Too Long: Triple J's Tribute to Paul Kelly =

Live album

Live album by Various Artists
- Released: 12 February 2010
- Recorded: 13–14 November 2009; Forum Theatre, Melbourne
- Genres: Pop, rock
- Length: 185:26
- Label: ABC Music
- Producer: Chris Thompson

Before Too Long: Triple J's Tribute to Paul Kelly is a three-disc tribute album by various artists of tracks originally performed by Australian singer-songwriter, Paul Kelly, which was released by ABC Music on 12 February 2010. Two discs were recorded at two live concerts, sponsored by national radio station triple j, on 13 and 14 November 2009 at the Forum Theatre in Melbourne, Australia.

The concerts celebrated Kelly's 30th year as a recording artist and were organised by Richard Kingsmill, musical director at Triple J. Kingsmill invited a variety of Australian artists to choose tracks to perform. The third disc consists of Kelly's originals of most of the live tracks. The related video recording of the concerts was issued on 19 February as 2× DVD with 26 live concert tracks on the first disc and back stage interviews with Kelly and some of the performers on the second disc.

At the ARIA Music Awards of 2010 the album won Best Original Soundtrack and the video recording was nominated for Best Music DVD.

== The concert ==
Before Too Long: Triple J's Tribute to Paul Kelly celebrates Paul Kelly's 30th anniversary as a recording artist. Richard Kingsmill, musical director at national radio station, Triple J organised two tribute concerts: he asked various Australian artists to perform their favourite Kelly tracks. Kingsmill announced the tribute on air "[t]here is a huge amount of respect and admiration within the Australian music industry – not to mention the public as well – for Paul and all that he's achieved. He is one of our songwriting greats and worthy of celebrating".

The concerts were held on 13 and 14 November at the Forum Theatre, Melbourne. Kelly attended and performed "Leaps and Bounds" with the band: Ashley Naylor (from Kelly's touring band, as musical director) on guitar and backing vocals; Edmondo Ammendola on bass guitar and backing vocals; Kiernan Box on keyboards, accordion and harmonica; Adam Donovan on guitar, lapsteel, mandolin and backing vocals; Ken Gardner on trumpet; Matthew Habben on tenor saxophone; Adam Hutterer on trombone; and David Williams on drums and backing vocals. Ammendola, Box, Donovan and Williams are all members of Augie March.

== Recordings ==
The concert was recorded for a 3× CD and a 2x DVD of the same name released in February 2010.

== Reception ==
Professional ratings
Review scores
Source	Rating
AllMusic	3/5 stars

AllMusic's Adam Greenberg described the project as a "massive show" with "a nice lineup of artists from around the stylistic horn" however there were "some messy audio" problems on the recording. Greenberg felt that Megan Washington "steals the show early on with powerful vocals that rise above the audio mess", followed by Paul Dempsey providing a "tinkling, twinkling country song". Later Missy Higgins performance was "an excellent (and excellent-sounding) bit of crooning and acoustic piano that brings the sound back to a more intimate nature".

Julia Winterflood of BMA Magazine described the album as a "glorious, triumphant and moving testament" which portrays Kelly as "not only an unbridled rocker and exceptionally brilliant balladeer, but a poet, too". Writing for The West Australian, Simon Collins praised Naylor's effort on the title track, Washington's "soft side with an a cappella version of 'Meet Me in the Middle of the Air'", and Adalita's "spoken-word performance of 'Everything's Turning to White' ... not long after the death of her bandmate Dean Turner, is also touching". Turner of Magic Dirt had died in August 2009 of tissue cancer, aged 37.

At the ARIA Music Awards of 2010 the album won Best Original Soundtrack, the trophy was collected by Kingsmill and Naylor on behalf of all the artists involved. The video recording was nominated for Best Music DVD.

== Track listing ==
All tracks are written by Paul Kelly, unless otherwise noted.

CD 1
No.	Title	Performer	Length
1.	"Before Too Long"	Ash Naylor	3:59
2.	"Love Never Runs on Time"	Bob Evans	3:05
3.	"From St Kilda to Kings Cross"	Bob Evans	3:14
4.	"Everybody Loves You Baby" (Paul Kelly, Dan Kelly, Dan Luscombe, Peter Luscombe, Bill MacDonald)	Megan Washington	4:02
5.	"Meet Me in the Middle of the Air"	Megan Washington	3:28
6.	"Your Lovin' Is on My Mind"	Paul Dempsey	4:40
7.	"Down to My Soul"	Dan Kelly	4:43
8.	"Crosstown"	Dan Kelly	2:57
9.	"Every Fucking City"	Katy Steele	3:49
10.	"Give in to My Love"	Dan Sultan	4:30
11.	"Look So Fine, Feel So Low" (P Kelly, Maurice Frawley)	Dan Sultan	3:41
12.	"They Thought I Was Asleep"	Jae Laffer	4:18
13.	"Deeper Water" (P Kelly, Randy Jacobs)	Clare Bowditch	5:39
14.	"To Her Door"	Clare Bowditch	4:27
Total length:			56:32

CD 2
No.	Title	Performer	Length
1.	"When I First Met Your Ma"	Jae Laffer	6:08
2.	"Careless"	Ozi Batla	3:28
3.	"Sydney from a 727"	Ozi Batla	3:08
4.	"Everything's Turning to White"	Adalita Srsen	2:56
5.	"Sweet Guy"	Adalita Srsen	3:50
6.	"Most Wanted Man in the World (Intro)" (Katy Steele)	Katy Steele	0:44
7.	"Most Wanted Man in the World"	Katy Steele	4:50
8.	"Dumb Things"	Paul Dempsey	3:13
9.	"(You Can Put Your) Shoes Under My Bed"	Missy Higgins	3:24
10.	"If I Could Start Today Again"	Missy Higgins	3:44
11.	"How to Make Gravy"	John Butler	5:30
12.	"From Little Things Big Things Grow (Intro)" (John Butler & Dan Sultan)	John Butler & Dan Sultan	1:11
13.	"From Little Things Big Things Grow" (Kev Carmody, P Kelly)	John Butler, Dan Sultan & Missy Higgins	7:13
14.	"Leaps and Bounds (Intro)"	Paul Kelly	1:40
15.	"Leaps and Bounds" (P Kelly, Chris Langman)	Paul Kelly	3:48
Total length:			54:47

CD 3
No.	Title	Length
1.	"Before Too Long"	3:22
2.	"From St Kilda to Kings Cross"	2:55
3.	"Everybody Loves You Baby"	3:13
4.	"Meet Me in the Middle of the Air"	2:36
5.	"Down to My Soul"	3:56
6.	"Give in to My Love"	3:58
7.	"Look So Fine, Feel So Low"	3:01
8.	"They Thought I Was Asleep"	3:32
9.	"Deeper Water"	4:24
10.	"To Her Door"	3:17
11.	"When I First Met Your Ma"	4:44
12.	"Careless"	2:53
13.	"Everything's Turning to White"	4:40
14.	"Sweet Guy"	3:30
15.	"Most Wanted Man in the World"	3:37
16.	"Dumb Things"	2:31
17.	"(You Can Put Your) Shoes Under My Bed"	3:32
18.	"If I Could Start Today Again"	2:50
19.	"How to Make Gravy"	4:28
20.	"From Little Things Big Things Grow"	6:52
Total length:		74:07

== Video recording ==
Before Too Long: Triple J's Tribute to Paul Kelly

Video by Various Artists
- Released: 19 February 2010
- Recorded: 13–14 November 2009; Forum Theatre, Melbourne
- Genres: Rock, pop
- Length: 116:00

Before Too Long: Triple J's Tribute to Paul Kelly is a video recording of two concerts of the same name performed by various artists. It was released on 19 February 2010 as 2× DVD with 26 tracks performed on 13 or 14 November 2009 on the first disc. The second disc contains back stage interviews with participants Paul Kelly, Ash Naylor, Dan Kelly (Paul's nephew), John Butler, Missy Higgins, Katy Steele and Clare Bowditch.

=== Track listing ===
All tracks are written by Paul Kelly, unless otherwise noted.

DVD 1
No.	Title	Performer	Length
1.	"Before Too Long"	Ash Naylor	3:59
2.	"Love Never Runs on Time"	Bob Evans	3:05
3.	"Everybody Loves You Baby" (Paul Kelly, Dan Kelly, Dan Luscombe, Peter Luscombe, Bill MacDonald)	Megan Washington	4:02
4.	"Meet Me in the Middle of the Air"	Megan Washington	3:28
5.	"Your Lovin' Is on My Mind"	Paul Dempsey	4:40
6.	"Down to My Soul"	Dan Kelly	4:43
7.	"Crosstown"	Dan Kelly	2:57
8.	"Every Fucking City"	Katy Steele	3:49
9.	"Give in to My Love"	Dan Sultan	4:30
10.	"Look So Fine, Feel So Low" (P Kelly, Maurice Frawley)	Dan Sultan	3:41
11.	"Deeper Water" (P Kelly, Randy Jacobs)	Clare Bowditch	5:39
12.	"To Her Door"	Clare Bowditch	4:27
13.	"They Thought I Was Asleep"	Jae Laffer	4:18
14.	"When I First Met Your Ma"	Jae Laffer	6:08
15.	"Careless"	Ozi Batla	3:28
16.	"Sydney from a 727"	Ozi Batla	3:08
17.	"Everything's Turning to White"	Adalita Srsen	2:56
18.	"Sweet Guy"	Adalita Srsen	3:50
19.	"From St Kilda to Kings Cross"	Bob Evans	3:14
20.	"Most Wanted Man in the World"	Katy Steele	4:50
21.	"Dumb Things"	Paul Dempsey	3:13
22.	"(You Can Put Your) Shoes Under My Bed"	Missy Higgins	3:24
23.	"If I Could Start Today Again"	Missy Higgins	3:44
24.	"How to Make Gravy"	John Butler	5:30
25.	"From Little Things Big Things Grow" (Kev Carmody, P Kelly)	John Butler, Dan Sultan & Missy Higgins	7:13
26.	"Leaps and Bounds" (P Kelly, Chris Langman)	Paul Kelly	3:48
Total length:			116:00

== Certifications ==
Region	Certification	Certified units/sales
Australia (ARIA)	Gold	7,500^{^}
^{^} Shipments figures based on certification alone.
