= Live at the Continental and the Esplanade =

Live album by Paul Kelly
- Released: Late 1995
- Recorded: 19–20 September 1994, 29 May 1995
- Genre: Australian Rock
- Length: 61:54
- Label: Mushroom/White

Paul Kelly chronology
Deeper Water (1995)	Live at the Continental and the Esplanade (1995)	Songs from the South (1997)

Live at the Continental and the Esplanade is a live album by Australian rock musician, Paul Kelly, which was originally available, from late 1995, by mail order only from Mushroom Records' White Records Label in Australia. It had been recorded from two performances at the (now defunct) Continental cafe in Prahran and one performance at the Esplanade Hotel in St Kilda, both in Melbourne. By June 1996 the album was available in Australian stores on Mushroom Records and, on 23 July, it was issued by Vanguard Records in the United States.

== Background ==
In July 1994, Australian musician, Paul Kelly, released his third solo album, Wanted Man. On 19 and 20 September, Kelly and his band performed at the Continental Hotel in Prahran, the sessions were recorded live. From March to May 1995, Kelly undertook a seven-week tour of North America, appearing on several dates with Liz Phair and Joe Jackson. On 29 May 1995, Kelly had returned to Melbourne and recorded more live tracks at the Esplanade Hotel's Gershwin Room. Kelly released his next album, Deeper Water in September. In late 1995, he issued Live at the Continental and the Esplanade on White Records Label via Mushroom Records – it was originally only available by mail order. The live recordings at the two hotels were not remixed nor overdubbed. By June 1996 the album was available in Australian stores on Mushroom Records and, on 23 July, it was issued by Vanguard Records in the United States.

== Reception ==
Professional ratings
Review scores
Source	Rating
Allmusic	2.5/5 stars
Rolling Stone	

Allmusic's William Ruhlmann felt "it provides a good sampler of his work, accompanied by a full band rather than [his recent] acoustic sets" and that its style was "melodic folk-rock with electric guitar for bite and often caustic lyrics".

== Track listing ==
All tracks are written by Paul Kelly except as shown.

1. "When I First Met Your Ma" – 4:35
2. "Maralinga" – 4:06
3. "God's Hotel" (Paul Kelly, Nick Cave) – 4:52
4. "Everybody Wants to Touch Me" – 3:47
5. "Somebody's Forgetting Somebody (Somebody's Letting Somebody Down)" – 4:43
6. "Just Like Animals" – 4:41
7. "To Her Door" – 3:41
8. "Pouring Petrol on a Burning Man" – 3:39
9. "Dumb Things" – 6:19
10. "Cities of Texas" – 5:06
11. "She's Rare" – 5:47
12. "Darling It Hurts" – 3:39
13. "Careless" – 3:56
14. "Summer Rain" – 3:03

== Personnel ==
Musicians

- Paul Kelly – guitars (acoustic, rhythm, electric), harmonica, lead vocals
- Steve Hadley - bass, backing vocals
- Bruce Haymes – keyboards, backing vocals
- Randy Jacobs – guitar (electric), backing vocals (all tracks except 6, 11)
- Graham Lee – pedal steel, backing vocals, slide guitar
- Peter Luscombe – drums
- Shane O'Mara - guitar (electric) (tracks 6, 11)
- Ray Pereira – djembe (tracks 6, 11)

Production details

- Don Bartley – mastering
- Jacqueline Mitelman – photography
- Simon Polinski – engineer
- Michael Wickow – assistant engineer
- Venues – The Continental Hotel, Prahran (tracks 1–5, 7–10, 12–14); Gershwin Room, The Esplanade Hotel, St Kilda (tracks 6, 11)
