= Sweet Guy =

Single by Paul Kelly and the Messengers

from the album So Much Water So Close to Home
- B-side: "Ghost Town"
- Released: June 1989
- Recorded: February–March 1989
- Studio: Trafalgar Studios, Sydney
- Genre: Rock
- Length: 3:40
- Label: Mushroom
- Songwriter: Paul Kelly
- Producers: Scott Litt, Paul Kelly

Paul Kelly and the Messengers singles chronology
| "Dumb Things" (1988) | "Sweet Guy" (1989) | "Careless" (1989) |

"Sweet Guy" is a song by Australian rock group Paul Kelly and the Messengers released in June 1989 as the lead single from the studio album, So Much Water So Close to Home. The song was written by Kelly – his first from a woman's point of view. He co-produced the track with Scott Litt. The single was released in June 1989 on the Mushroom Records label. It reached No. 53 on the Australian ARIA Singles Chart and the Top 40 in New Zealand. The song was later covered by Renée Geyer on Difficult Woman (1994), Adalita Srsen on Before Too Long.

== Background ==
Paul Kelly had formed Paul Kelly and the Coloured Girls in 1985, named for Lou Reed's "Walk on the Wild Side". The line-up of the Coloured Girls was Michael Barclay on drums and backing vocals, Peter Bull on keyboards, Steve Connolly on lead guitar and Jon Schofield on bass guitar. For international releases from 1987 they used the name Paul Kelly and the Messengers to avoid possible racist interpretations. The group released Gossip in 1986 on Mushroom Records in Australia and in 1987 on A&M Records for international release. A second album, Under the Sun, was issued in 1987 in Australia and in 1988 internationally.

Their next album, So Much Water So Close to Home was released in August 1989 as by Paul Kelly and the Messengers in all markets, it peaked at No. 10 on the ARIA Albums Chart. The entire album was recorded in the United States with Scott Litt, best known for his work with R.E.M., co-producing with Kelly. Litt had re-mixed some of Paul Kelly and the Coloured Girls' tracks from Gossip for its US release as by Paul Kelly and the Messengers. So Much Water So Close to Home was released on Mushroom/White Records in Australia and A&M Records in the US and Europe. "Sweet Guy" was the first single from the album, which reached No. 53 on the Australian ARIA Singles Chart and in September 1989 it peaked in the Top 40 in New Zealand.

The video for "Sweet Guy" was directed by Claudia Castle, who had earlier directed Kelly's "To Her Door", which won 'Best Video' at the ARIA Music Awards of 1988. The video is shot in black and white and switches between Kelly and his band, and a couple fighting and making up. Kelly later wrote that he was disappointed in the video, "this one looked like an ad for coffee or sheets... [Castle] had worked with us on a couple of videos previously ... that had turned out really well. We'd talked this one through and made a plan ... but when I saw the rough cut my heart sank. And there wasn't much I could do to change it".

In 2004 Paul Kelly and the Boon Companions performed the track for the DVD, Ways & Means, in the section subtitled Live in Boston. Kelly and his nephew Dan Kelly recorded the song as part of Kelly's A – Z Tours from 2004 to 2010, it was issued on the 8× CD album, The A – Z Recordings (2010). It was later covered by Renée Geyer on Difficult Woman (1994) – Kelly produced her album, also wrote the title song, "Careless" and "Foggy Highway". Adalita Srsen (ex-Magic Dirt) sang both "Sweet Guy" and "Everything's Turning to White" for the Kelly tribute show and related album, Before Too Long (2010). Peter Bull's daughter, Vika Bull performed "Sweet Guy" on the RocKwiz National Tour which was recorded on a DVD and CD of the same name (2010).

== Composition ==
"Sweet Guy" is a song with a length of three minutes and forty seconds. The song is set in the key of C major and has a medium fast tempo – 128 beats per minute – with a piano range of C_{2}–G_{5} and a vocal range of E_{4}–G_{5}. Kelly is credited with both lyrics and music. The lyrics are written in the first person perspective, with the narrator, a female, reflecting on the violent nature of her relationship and broods over the Jekyll and Hyde transformation of her partner from being loving and attentive into a violent man. Typical of the 'battered woman syndrome', she adopts a victim's view claiming that it is her problem, and is happy to forgive the man after he has bashed her. According to Rolling Stone's Clinton Walker the song is about Ian Rilen, where "his friend Paul Kelly sang in a song that was always understood to be about him, 'What makes such a sweet guy turn so mean?' He could be his own worst enemy". Rilen (Rose Tattoo, X) had supplied bass guitar for Kelly's first solo album, Post (1985), and was married to Stephanie Falcolner (Sardine v) at the time.

This was the first song that Kelly had penned from a woman's point of view – he was initially hesitant to sing it himself fearing that it would not sound "honest". Kelly had tried to persuade female singers to adopt it but his band encouraged him to keep it for themselves, "'Don't give this one away', said [Schofield], 'we can do it.' 'Yeah,' chipped in [Connolly] '...What's to stop you cross-singing?'". Paul Kelly and the Messengers first performed it at a Leagues Club on the central New South Wales coast – after several gigs Kelly felt perfectly normal singing it. Kelly liked Barclay's backing vocals as they "sounded sweet" and Connolly "had written a killer guitar riff to kick things off". Kelly enjoyed cross-singing and wrote both "Everything's Turning to White" and "South of Germany" from a woman's perspective – these tracks also appear on So Much Water So Close to Home.

The B-side, "Ghost Town" was also written by Kelly, but did not appear on an album until Kelly's 1994 release, Hidden Things, which also included a slower version of "Sweet Guy", re-titled as "Sweet Guy Waltz".

== Reception ==
Allmusic's Mike DeGagne liked "Everything's Turning to White" and "Sweet Guy" from So Much Water So Close to Home, he calls the latter "a disturbing piece" and observed that "[b]oth songs are true to Kelly's intriguing knack of fiction telling, making some of the other tunes seem a little weak in the content department". While for his review of Hidden Things, DeGagne wrote that "the slower version ... 'Sweet Guy Waltz' ... presents an even eerier feel than the quicker version".

== Track listing ==
1. "Sweet Guy" (Paul Kelly) – 3:40
2. "Ghost Town" (Kelly) – 2:51

== Personnel ==
Paul Kelly and the Messengers

- Michael Barclay – drums, backing vocals
- Peter Bull – keyboards
- Steve Connolly – lead guitar
- Paul Kelly – guitar, vocals, harmonica
- Jon Schofield – bass guitar

Additional musicians – "Sweet Guy"

- Steve Berlin – saxophone (baritone)

Recording details – "Sweet Guy"

- Producer – Scott Litt, Paul Kelly
- Engineer–– Scott Litt
  - Assistant–– Clif Norrell, Jim Dineen
- Studio – Ocean Way Studios, Los Angeles
  - Mastered – Precision Lacquer
  - Mixed – The Grey Room

Recording Details – "Ghost Town"

- Producer – Paul Kelly
- Mixing Engineer – Tim Ryan
- Recording Engineer – Ross Muir
- Studio – C.A.A.M.A. Music, Alice Springs
- Mixed – Trackdown Studios, Sydney

== Charts ==
Chart performance for "Sweet Guy"
| Chart (1989) | Peak position |
|---|---|
| Australia (ARIA) | 53 |
| New Zealand (Recorded Music NZ) | 39 |
