= How to Make Gravy =

Australian album by Paul Kelly

EP by Paul Kelly
- Released: 4 November 1996
- Recorded: 1996
- Genres: Rock, pop
- Length: 15:02
- Label: White
- Producers: Paul Kelly, Simon Polinski

Paul Kelly chronology
How to Make Gravy (1996)	Roll on Summer (2000)

Alternate cover
- US (Vanguard Records) release

How to Make Gravy is a four-track EP by Australian singer-songwriter Paul Kelly and was originally released on 4 November 1996 on White Label Records in Australia. The title track was written by Kelly and earned him a 'Song of the Year' nomination at the Australasian Performing Right Association (APRA) Music Awards of 1998. It tells the story of a newly imprisoned man writing a letter to his brother, in which the prisoner laments that he will be missing the family's Christmas celebrations. The same character appears in two of Kelly's earlier songs, "To Her Door" (1987) and "Love Never Runs on Time" (1994), as well as the later sequel song "Rita Wrote a Letter" (2025). The gravy recipe is genuine – Kelly learnt it from his first father-in-law. It was covered by James Reyne on a 2003 tribute album Stories of Me: A Songwriter's Tribute to Paul Kelly, and on Reyne's 2005 acoustic album And the Horse You Rode in On.

It has also been covered by David Miles, Luca Brasi, From Nowhere, Semicolon, Ghostwriters, Karl Broadie and Lawrence Agar. In September 2010, Kelly titled his memoirs, How to Make Gravy. On 29 September 2012 Kelly performed "How to Make Gravy" and "Leaps and Bounds" at the 2012 AFL Grand Final. A film version was originally set for release as a Christmas movie by Warner Bros in December 2023; however, the movie was delayed to late 2024. It stars Hugo Weaving and is directed by Nick Waterman.

"Gravy Day" (21 December, the day on which the prisoner in the song writes the letter) was created by fans and is celebrated by internet memes each year.

== Background ==
Paul Kelly's album Wanted Man was released in 1994 and reached No. 11 on the Australian Recording Industry Association (ARIA) Albums Chart. Kelly also composed music for the 1994 film Everynight ... Everynight, directed by Alkinos Tsilimidos; it is set in the notorious H division of Victoria's Pentridge Prison. Kelly's next solo releases were Deeper Water in 1995 and Live at the Continental and the Esplanade in 1996. Between March and May 1995 Kelly undertook a seven-week tour of North America, appearing on several dates with Liz Phair and Joe Jackson.

By 1996, Paul Kelly Band members were Stephen Hadley (bass guitar, ex-Black Sorrows), Bruce Haymes (keyboards), Peter Luscombe (drums, ex-Black Sorrows) and Shane O'Mara (guitar). Spencer P. Jones (slide guitar, Beasts of Bourbon) guested on some performances. This line-up issued the EP How to Make Gravy, with the title track earning Kelly a 'Song of the Year' nomination at the Australasian Performing Right Association (APRA) Music Awards of 1998. In August 1996, Kelly performed the song at the Edmonton Folk Music Festival, with O'Mara on slide guitar, which was included on Edmonton Folk Festival Compilation Album (1996). The song was included in 1998 as an extra track on the US release of Words and Music by Vanguard Records. That year, "How to Make Gravy" was also issued as a US single but with a different cover: it depicts a roasted fowl on a serving tray held by a smiling woman with the words 'Christmas Single' included. Kelly and his nephew Dan Kelly recorded the song as part of Kelly's A – Z Tours from 2004 to 2010, it was issued on the 8× CD album, The A – Z Recordings (2010). A drama film, based on the song, is due for release as a Christmas movie by Warner Bros in December 2023.

== Composition ==
"How to Make Gravy"
30-second sample

"How to Make Gravy" is five minutes and ten seconds long. The song is set in the key of E major and has a medium tempo with a piano range of B_{1}–E_{5} and a vocal range of B_{3}–E_{5}. Kelly is credited with both lyrics and music. The lyrics tell the story of a newly imprisoned man writing a letter to his brother, in which the prisoner laments that he will be missing the family's Christmas celebrations. The same character is the protagonist in earlier songs by Kelly, "To Her Door" (1987) (named "Jack" in the album version) and "Love Never Runs on Time" (1994). All three tracks appear on Kelly's live 8× CD boxed set, The A – Z Recordings (2010).

In 1996 Kelly was approached by Lindsay Field, the guitarist and backing vocalist for John Farnham, to perform a Christmas-themed song or carol for a various artists charity record, The Spirit of Christmas, to raise money for the Salvation Army. Kelly originally selected "Christmas Must Be Tonight" by Robbie Robertson (The Band); however, that had already been performed by James Blundell on The Spirit of Christmas 1994, so he told Field that he would have a go at writing one instead. Kelly later recalled, "I had a rough tune I'd been kicking around with the band at sound check, but was having trouble getting started on the words. Kelly's inspiration for the lyrics was subsequently drawn from Irving Berlin's White Christmas, where "Irving intensifies the feeling of Christmas by not being there". He advised Field, "I have a Christmas song but it doesn't have a chorus and it's set in a prison". Field was overcome with emotion when he first heard it and convinced the Salvation Army's selection group to accept it for the collection.

The gravy recipe is genuine – Kelly learnt it from his father-in-law: "Just add flour, salt, a little red wine and don't forget a dollop of tomato sauce".

Late in December 2017 Kelly explained to Luke Wong of ABC Radio Melbourne, "It was a song that doesn't have a chorus, it's set in prison, so I never thought it would be a hit song or anything... Once I start playing that song it lifts you up and takes you along with it." As for Joe, the protagonist, Wong asked, "whatever happened to Joe? Did he ever get out of prison on good behaviour?" with Kelly responding, "He seems to be like the character in some of my other songs; he's a bit like the guy in 'To Her Door'. I think he got out."

In August 2025, Kelly released a sequel song titled "Rita Wrote a Letter", which reveals that while Joe makes it out of prison and returns to work, Rita has gotten together with Dan as Joe fears in the lyrics of "How to Make Gravy". The song is also sung posthumously from the point of view of Joe.

== Gravy Day ==
In the lyrics Joe wrote his letter on 21 December, which led fans to dub the day "Gravy Day". A parody account on X called The Gravy Man has helped to spread the word since 2015, posting humorous profanity-laden memes about the song, including about collecting royalties for it.

== Cover versions ==
It was covered by James Reyne on the 2003 tribute album, Stories of Me: A Songwriter's Tribute to Paul Kelly and on Reyne's 2005 acoustic album ...And the Horse You Rode in On. It has also been covered by David Miles, From Nowhere, Semicolon, Ghostwriters, Karl Broadie and Lawrence Agar. John Butler performed the song at a Kelly tribute show which was recorded on the related triple album, Before Too Long (2010). Christine Anu covered the song on her 2014 Christmas album, Island Christmas. Tasmanian band Luca Brasi covered the song in June 2016 for Triple J's Like a Version segment. Australian folk group All Our Exes Live in Texas also covered the song for Bloodshot Records's "13 Days of Xmas" compilation.

== Film adaptation ==
In October 2023, it was announced at Foxtel’s 2024 upfronts the song was to be adapted into film which features actors Daniel Henshall, Hugo Weaving, Agathe Rouselle, Brenton Thwaites, Damon Herriman and Kate Mulvany. The film is the first original movie for Binge, which was filmed on the Gold Coast, Queensland, written by Meg Washington and Nick Waterman, who also directed. Schuyler Weiss produced alongside Washington, Waterman and Hamish Lewis. Produced by Warner Bros. Int. TV Production Australia.

== Reception ==
"How to Make Gravy" was nominated as 'Song of the Year' at the 1997 Australian Record Industry Association (ARIA) Awards, which was won by Savage Garden's "Truly Madly Deeply". Kelly was also nominated and won 'Best Male Artist' at that year's ARIA Awards on the success of the song. It was also nominated as 'Song of the Year' at the 1998 Australasian Performing Right Association (APRA) Music Awards, which was won by Leonardo's Bride's "Even When I’m Sleeping".

Allmusic's Tom Hallet praised the track in his review of the US version of Words & Music, "cult maestro Kelly draws on a rich tapestry of characters and true to life situations, and has his finger firmly planted on the universal heartbeat with loose, catchy yarns ... [including one on] Christmas in jail".

In 2008 John Butler selected the song as his favourite Australian song of the last 20 years:

I just reacquainted myself with the lyrics online and I have to say it brought tears to my eyes again. What a wordsmith! This song is the perfect example of what we as artists try to do – to explain and convey the very emotion and feeling of a situation and setting in just a few words. It is an art and there is something divine about the process, and Paul has that gift. This song is steeped in modern Australian culture. How is it that I feel like I know Dan, Rita, Frank, Dolly and the kids? I can smell the roast and see the cars parked in the front yard. The stubby holders, piles of wrapping paper, the heat rippling up from the road and the camaraderie in the busy kitchen. I’ve been at that Christmas … or have I? Either way, after hearing, feeling, experiencing that song, I have now.

On 29 September 2012 Kelly performed "How to Make Gravy" and "Leaps and Bounds" at the 2012 AFL Grand Final although most of the performance was not broadcast on Seven Network's pre-game segment. Nui Te Koha of Sunday Herald Sun declared "Kelly, an integral part of Melbourne folklore and its music scene, and a noted footy tragic, deserved his place on the Grand Final stage – which has been long overdue ... broadcaster Seven's refusal to show Kelly's performance, except the last verse of 'Leaps and Bounds', was no laughing matter".

Late in December 2017 and early January 2018 the EP appeared on the ARIA Singles Chart at No. 54. A year later it re-entered the top 100 at No. 37. In 2025 the song was voted 9th in the Triple J Hottest 100 of Australian Songs.

== Track listing ==
All tracks are written by Paul Kelly

How to Make Gravy track listing
No.	Title	Length
1.	"How to Make Gravy"	5:10
2.	"I'd Rather Go Blind (Than See You with Another Guy)"	3:12
3.	"I'll Be Your Lover Now"	3:50
4.	"Glory Be to God"	2:50

== Personnel ==
Paul Kelly Band members

- Stephen Hadley – bass guitar ("How to Make Gravy", "I'd Rather Go Blind Than See You with Another Guy")
- Bruce Haymes – keyboard
- Spencer P. Jones – slide guitar ("How to Make Gravy", "I'd Rather Go Blind Than See You with Another Guy", "Glory Be to God"), drawing (tomato sauce bottle on original cover art)
- Paul Kelly – guitar, vocals
- Peter Luscombe – drums
- Shane O'Mara – guitar ("How to Make Gravy", "I'd Rather Go Blind Than See You with Another Guy", "I'll Be Your Lover Now")
- Bill MacDonald – bass guitar ("I'll Be Your Lover Now", "Glory Be to God")

Recording details

- Oscar Gaona – mastering
- Victor Van Vugt – mix engineer ("I'd Rather Go Blind Than See You with Another Guy", "I'll Be Your Lover Now", "Glory Be to God")
- Simon Polinski – sound engineer ("How to Make Gravy", "I'd Rather Go Blind Than See You with Another Guy"), producer ("How to Make Gravy")
- Paul Kelly – producer ("How to Make Gravy", "I'd Rather Go Blind Than See You with Another Guy", "I'll Be Your Lover Now", "Glory Be to God")

== Charts ==
Chart performance for "How to Make Gravy"
Chart (1997)	Peak position
Australia (ARIA)	144

Chart (2018–2022)	Peak position
Australia (ARIA)	34

== Certifications ==
Certifications for "How to Make Gravy"
Region	Certification	Certified units/sales
Australia (ARIA)	4× Platinum	280,000^{‡}
New Zealand (RMNZ)	Gold	15,000^{‡}
^{‡} Sales+streaming figures based on certification alone.

== Release history ==
Release history and formats for How to Make Gravy
Country	Format	Label	Catalogue no.	Year
Australia	EP	White Label	D1513	1996
United States	CD single	Vanguard (promotional release)	740-2	1998
