= Dumb Things =

Single by Paul Kelly and the Coloured Girls

from the album Under the Sun
- B-side: "Deportees"
- Released: January 1989
- Studio: Trafalgar, Sydney
- Genre: Rock, ska
- Length: 2:46
- Label: White Label
- Songwriter: Paul Kelly
- Producers: Martin Armiger, Paul Kelly

Paul Kelly and the Coloured Girls singles chronology
"Don't Stand So Close to the Window" (1988)	"Dumb Things" (1989)	"Sweet Guy" (1989)

Audio sample
- file; help

Alternative cover

"Dumb Things" (also known as "(I've Done all the) Dumb Things") is a song by Australian rock group Paul Kelly and the Coloured Girls, released as the fourth single from their second album, Under the Sun. It was released by Mushroom Records imprint White Label Records in January 1989 and reached No. 36 on the Australian Recording Industry Association (ARIA) Singles Chart. In the US, it was released under the band name, Paul Kelly and the Messengers, which reached No. 16 on the Billboard Modern Rock chart. A music video, directed by Larry Williams, was provided for the single – a still from the clip is used as the single's cover.

== Background ==
In 1985, Paul Kelly, on acoustic guitar and lead vocals, was backed by the Coloured Girls: Michael Armiger on bass guitar, Michael Barclay on drums, Steve Connolly on guitar and keyboardist Peter Bull. Because of possible racist connotations the band changed its name, for international releases, to Paul Kelly and the Messengers. In 1986 they undertook an American tour, initially supporting Crowded House and then head-lining, travelling across the United States by bus. Jon Schofield replaced Armiger on bass guitar, while Chris Coyne on tenor saxophone and Chris Wilson on harmonica joined the line-up.

First single from their second album, Under the Sun (December 1987) was "To Her Door" which was issued ahead of the album in September and peaked at No. 14 on the Australian Kent Music Report Singles Chart. The second single "Forty Miles to Saturday Night", which had been released in January 1988, had little chart success, only reaching No. 85. The third single "Don't Stand So Close to the Window" also had little chart success. The fourth single "Dumb Things" peaked at No. 36 in February 1989, on the Australian Recording Industry Association (ARIA) singles charts; it reached No. 16 on the Billboard Modern Rock chart. The song was included in the soundtrack for the 1988 Yahoo Serious film Young Einstein. The single was re-release with an alternate cover depicting Serious in the title role of Einstein. The track was re-mixed by Scott Litt and is the version found on the double 7" single.

During the late 1980s, Paul Kelly and the Coloured Girls often toured with folk rockers Weddings Parties Anything, and both groups combined for the B-side "Deportees", a Woody Guthrie cover, which was recorded in the studio of Perth radio station 96FM by Steve Gordon and Bob Vogt. At the same session they also recorded a version of "Beggar on the Street of Love", which was subsequently released as a B side to Kelly's 1990 release "Most Wanted Man in the World". From 1993 to 1998 Coloured Girls' drummer Barclay was a member of Weddings Parties Anything.

A music video, directed by Larry Williams, was provided for the single – a still from the clip is used as the single's cover. The sepia coloured video, features Kelly and his band performing in a sideshow at a carnival. In May 1992 Kelly recorded a live version for his solo concert performance at the Athenaeum Theatre for the VHS album Paul Kelly Live at the Athenaeum, May 1992 (1992). It was directed and produced by Mat Humphrey. A related 2× CD album Live, May 1992 also included "Dumb Things". In September 1994 Kelly, with a new backing band, performed the song live at the Continental Hotel in Prahran, which was issued on Live at the Continental and the Esplanade in late 1995. In 2004 Paul Kelly and the Boon Companions performed the track for the DVD Ways & Means, in the section subtitled Live in Boston. Kelly and his nephew Dan Kelly recorded the song as part of Kelly's A – Z Tours from 2004 to 2010, it was issued on the 8× CD album, The A – Z Recordings (2010).

"Dumb Things" was covered by alternative rockers Lash on the Paul Kelly tribute album Women at the Well (2002), and by Paul Dempsey (from Something for Kate) on Before Too Long – A Tribute to Paul Kelly (2009). The Cat Empire performed a live version for the various artists' release Live at the Wireless (May 2005) which was also issued on their own live album Live on Earth (2009).

Hip-hop duo A.B. Original performed a cover of "Dumb Things" for Like a Version in 2016. The cover featured Kelly himself singing and playing harmonica, Dan Sultan on guitar, and Lowrider's John and Paul Bartlett on keys and drums, while A.B. Original's Briggs and Trials performed original rap verses criticising racism towards Indigenous Australians over the song. The performance was ranked 45th on the Triple J Hottest 100, 2016. At the ARIA Music Awards of 2017 ceremony, Kelly, A.B. Original and Sultan performed a live version.

== Composition ==
In 1986, Kelly was working on 14 songs for Under the Sun, which were recorded as demos. Kelly's wife Kaarin Fairfax was recording scenes for her role in the movie Young Einstein (1988). Her fellow actress Lulu Pinkus was married to the film's director, Yahoo Serious, who was looking for material for its soundtrack. A tape copy of the demo tracks was handed to Serious with Kelly's instructions "See if there's anything that fits. They're just roughs. We're going back into the studio next month to record them properly". Kelly expected to work further on the tracks: "I'd made notes to adjust a few of them. 'Dumb Things', for one, was too fast. I'd wanted it to have more of a grind but it sounded a little ahead of itself". When Serious used the demo version for a scene in Young Einstein Kelly was unable to change its tempo while recording the studio version. The group were "playing along to our demo pumping through the speakers... We even mimicked ... the way the original track sped up and slowed down".

Kelly said, "I know the song doesn't sound anything like The Go-Betweens, but somehow in my head, [after] listening to The Go-Betweens, that melody came. The way that Robert Forster sings at the top of his range so the voice has a kind of edge on it. That was something that's happening in that song too."

"Dumb Things" is written in a fairly fast tempo – about 144 beats per minute – with the piano ranging from E2 to C5 and the voice ranging from A3 to C5. The song is one of the works studied for VCE Units 3 and 4 Solo Performance. According to Mandy Stefanakis of the Association of Music Educators (Victoria) its main inspirations are The Clash's "London Calling" and Elvis Presley's version of "Mystery Train". Stefankis feels it contains the three main elements of ska which she describes as "a hybrid of rockabilly, reggae and punk".

According to Stefanakis the lyrics in the chorus about being "in the middle of a dream" relate to two main ideas: "I'm dreaming if I thought my friends would rush to my defence ... he has been betrayed by those he felt would be loyal..." and "Reality check. Let down by chick? Double whammy. Let down by friends". The next part I lost my shirt relates to "a level of personal irresponsibility" and links with the rest of the line I pawned my rings where "[r]ings are symbols of love, family, togetherness and eternity ... he has sold all this. He has nothing". Stefanakis states that Kelly's "writing draws on known sayings, metaphors and platitudes and gives them a bit of a twist! It's humorous, but it's also poignant".

== Reception ==
Allmusic's Mike DeGagne describes the album, Under the Sun as "Opening up with the blazing harmonica of 'Dumb Things,' Under the Sun finds Paul Kelly singing both acoustically bright story songs and character-based tales with unlimited substance". William Ruhlmann, reviewed Live at the Continental and the Esplanade's version, "[it is] one of his best songs from the Messengers days, retains the feel of a Dire Straits shuffle".

The song was included on the soundtrack for the 1988 Yahoo Serious film Young Einstein and the single was re-released with a different cover, although with the same catalogue number. The song was also in the 1989 film, Look Who's Talking, which starred John Travolta and Kirstie Alley. It was also released as a double single, with the second single containing "Rock 'n' Roll Soul" written by the Coloured Girls member, Jon Schofield. Its flip-side is a cover version of the Australian Crawl song, "Reckless", again with same catalogue number as the original single. Kelly's cover of "Reckless" also appeared on the 1990 tribute album, Used and Recovered. "Dumb Things" was covered by alternative rockers Lash on the Paul Kelly tribute album, Women at the Well (2002), and by Paul Dempsey (from Something for Kate) on Before Too Long – A Tribute to Paul Kelly (2010). In 2012 the song was used as the opening theme for the Australian reality TV series The Shire. Australian singer Jessica Mauboy covered the song for The Secret Daughter in 2017.

== Track listing ==
7" vinyl single

1. "Dumb Things" (Paul Kelly) – 2:46
2. "Deportees" (Woody Guthrie) – 4:38

Double 7" vinyl single

1. "Dumb Things" (Kelly) – 2:41
2. "Deportees" (Guthrie) – 4:32
3. "Rock 'n' Soul" (Jon Schofield) – 2:34
4. "Reckless" (James Reyne) – 3:59

== Personnel ==
Paul Kelly and the Coloured Girls

- Paul Kelly – acoustic guitar, lead vocals
- Michael Barclay – drums, vocals
- Peter Bull – keyboards
- Steve Connolly – guitar (electric), vocals
- Chris Coyne – saxophone (tenor)
- Jon Schofield – bass guitar, vocals (on "Rock 'n' Soul")
- Chris Wilson – harmonica, vocals, saxophone (baritone)

Weddings Parties Anything – "Deportees"

- Michael 'Mick' Thomas – co-lead vocals
- David Steel – lead guitar
- Pete Lawler – backing vocals
- Marcus Schintler – backing vocals
- Mark Wallace – backing vocals

Recording details

- Producer of "Dumb Things", Martin Armiger and Paul Kelly; Producer – Alan Thorne, Paul Kelly, Steve Gordon ("Deportees")
- Engineer – Alan Thorne
  - Assistant engineer – Kathy Naunton
- Recording & mixing studio – Alberts and Trafalgar Studios, 96FM Studio ("Deportees")
- Remix – Scott Litt ("Dumb Things" Double 7" vinyl single version)

Art work

- Design – Melanie Nissen
- Photography – Francine McDougall (cover photo), Isabel

== Charts ==
Chart (1988)	Peak position
Australia (ARIA)	36
US Billboard Modern Rock Tracks	16

== Certifications ==
Region	Certification	Certified units/sales
Australia (ARIA)	5× Platinum	350,000^{‡}
^{‡} Sales+streaming figures based on certification alone.
