= Tom Carlyon =

Australian rules footballer

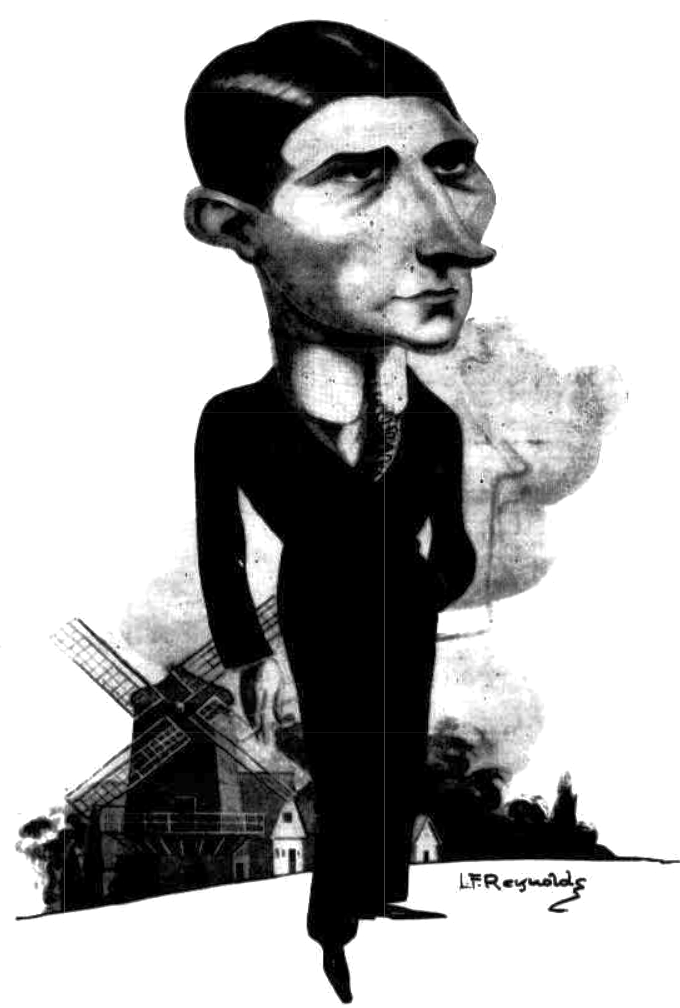
- 1927 caricature by Reynolds

Personal information
- Full name: Thomas Symington Carlyon
- Born: 27 April 1902; Ballarat, Victoria
- Died: 14 March 1982 (aged 79); Malvern, Victoria
- Height: 183 cm (6 ft 0 in)
- Weight: 79 kg (174 lb)

Playing career^{1}
Years	Club	Games (Goals)
1923	St Kilda	2 (0)
- ^{1} Playing statistics correct to the end of 1923.

Thomas Symington Carlyon (27 April 1902 – 14 March 1982) was an Australian hotelier, horse racing administrator, and military officer in World War II. As a young man, he excelled at rowing, and, at the age of 21, played Australian rules football with St Kilda in the Victorian Football League (VFL).

== Early life and education ==
Thomas Symington Carlyon Jnr was born on 27 April 1902 in Ballarat, the son of Thomas Symington Carlyon Snr (1866–1925), former steamboat captain on the Murray River and later Victorian hotelier, whose hotel chain included the Esplanade Hotel ("The Espy") in St Kilda.

He attended Geelong Grammar School, where he was a member of the rowing team in 1920.

== Career ==
=== Sport ===
Carlyon played in two games for St Kilda in the VFL at the age of 21.

=== Business ===
Carlyon often managed his father's hotels during his absences overseas, and took over his father's interests in the hotel industry after his death.

He worked for some time as a bellhop page in The Bellevue-Stratford Hotel in Philadelphia, United States, where he gained practical and theoretical knowledge of the Boomer hotel chain. After returning to Australia, he continued to work in his father's businesses. In January 1930, he was appointed general manager of Usher's Hotel in Sydney.

He later became an administrator in the horse racing industry.

=== War service ===
Carlyon joined the Royal Australian Air Force in 1939, becoming a squadron leader.

== Honours ==
On 13 October 1944 Carlyon was awarded an O.B.E. for his war service, which was presented to him in Melbourne in March 1947.

He was made CMG on 1 January 1968, "for services to horse racing".

== Personal life ==
Carlyon had two brothers who also worked in the hotel industry, one of whom was Norman.

He had at least one son, Thomas Scott Carlyon, born around 1929, who was also a hotelier.
