= Masada College =

Location
- St Ives, New South Wales; Australia; 33°43′45.4″S 151°10′1.07″E

Information
- Type: Independent co-educational early learning, primary and secondary day school
- Motto: My Rock & My Fortress
- Religious affiliation: Judaism
- Principal: Raquel Charet
- Years: Early learning and K–12
- Gender: Co-educational
- Enrolment: approx 600
- Website: masada.nsw.edu.au

Masada College is an independent Jewish co-educational day school located in St Ives, on the Upper North Shore of Sydney, New South Wales, Australia. The school consists of an early learning centre, junior school (Kindergarten to Year 6), and senior school (Year 7 to Year 12). Established as Australia's first Jewish international co-educational school, Masada College welcomes students from diverse backgrounds, with enrolment open to non-Jewish families as well.

== History ==
The idea for Masada College began in 1962 when a group of Jewish parents on Sydney's North Shore founded the North Shore Jewish Kindergarten. On June 11, 1966, the first advertisement was placed for staff, and the first students began their education on September 19, 1966. The Masada Primary School was established with 14 students, and operated out of the North Shore Synagogue in Lindfield. The school expanded to over 50 students in a few years.

In 1982, Masada College extended its offering to include a high school, starting with 60 students across Years 7 and 8. In 1983, the school relocated to its current Michael Faktor Campus in St Ives, which also became home to the Kehillat Masada Synagogue in 1984.

In 2014, Masada College consolidated all operations onto the Michael Faktor Campus, streamlining early learning, primary, and secondary education into a single campus setting.

Over the years, the campus has received several expansions and updates, including:

- 1990: The addition of the Rachael and Reuben Pelerman Centre.
- 2003: Extension and upgrade of the Sir Asher Joel Synagogue and improvements to the campus resource center.
- 2024: The Senior Library was refurbished with new workspaces and technology.

== Meaning of the name ==
In the early stages of the school's establishment, members of the Board of Management gathered to discuss potential names. A recurring theme in their discussions was mountains, as several Jewish schools are named after significant mountains.

During one meeting, Bob Shteinman, a committee member, suggested the name Masada, referencing the ancient fortress in southern Israel. At the time, the name was not widely recognized. The martyrs of Masada were a small group of Jews who maintained their beliefs in the face of overwhelming challenges. The name was chosen for its connection to strength, resilience, and cultural identity. The school motto, "My rock and my fortress," reflects this historical reference.

== Academic achievement ==
According to Higher School Certificate (HSC) results, Massada College regularly places within the top 80 schools in NSW for academic outcomes.

2024 HSC Results:

- Ranked 37th overall in New South Wales with a median ATAR of 92.2.
- Recognized as the highest-ranked co-educational school on Sydney's North Shore.
- 59% of students received an ATAR of 90 or above.

Students are consistently nominated and selected for various HSC Showcases, with five students receiving nominations in 2024, and one student's work being selected for display at the Art Gallery of NSW.

The school participates in programs such as the Duke of Edinburgh's Award, with students regularly completing the Gold level.

== Values and community engagement ==
Masada College incorporates values-based education, drawing on Jewish traditions and broader ethical principles. The school promotes respect, responsibility, and inclusivity, encouraging students to engage thoughtfully with their peers and the wider community.

Community involvement is an ongoing aspect of school life, with students participating in charity initiatives, volunteer projects, and cultural events, such as Pink Stumps Day, supporting the McGrath Foundation.

Students also take on leadership responsibilities, including roles as Peer Support Leaders, where they mentor younger students and help foster a supportive school environment, as well as Prefects, Captains, and on the Student Representative Council (SRC). The school maintains connections with multiple external organisations and consistently takes part in community events such as the NAJEX Remembrance Day Commemoration.

== Cultures of Thinking ==
Masada College follows the Cultures of Thinking (CoT) framework, an educational approach developed by Harvard University's Project Zero. This initiative integrates critical thinking and intellectual curiosity into classroom practices.

Teachers use thinking routines to guide students in developing reasoning skills, articulating their thoughts, and approaching problems systematically. Teachers encourage active participation and collaboration among students.

The framework also emphasizes visible thinking, where students document and reflect on their thought processes through discussions, written reflections, and collaborative activities.

The Cultures of Thinking approach supports students in developing skills such as critical analysis, problem-solving, and reflective thinking, which are applicable across academic subjects and in broader contexts.

== Jewish life and cultural programs ==
Masada College integrates Jewish traditions, values, and culture into daily school life and annual events. Students participate in commemorative events as well as Shabbat experiences, Chanukah concerts, and Purim celebrations. Students engage with Jewish heritage, history, and traditions through these events.

The school also offers programs focused on Jewish education across all year levels, covering subjects such as Hebrew language, Jewish history, and religious studies. Students develop a deeper understanding of their cultural identity through classroom learning, experiential activities, and participation in community celebrations.

=== Living Historians Program ===
The Living Historians Program is a key initiative in Masada College’s education curriculum. Each year, Year 6 and Year 10 students undertake detailed research projects on individual Holocaust survivors, exploring their personal stories and historical context. The program culminates in events where students present their findings to peers, parents, and community members.

A highlight of the program includes the presence of Holocaust survivors who share their experiences with students. As part of the program, students also create artworks reflecting their understanding of the survivors' stories, which are presented during the event. The initiative articulates the lessons of the Holocaust and encourages students to explore themes of resilience, compassion, and historical responsibility.

== Australian spirit ==
Masada College represents a broad spectrum of the Australian immigration story, with recent immigrants, international students, and students from families who have been in Australia for generations. The school incorporates programs that reflect Australia’s history and values.

Each year, students participate in an ANZAC Day service to recognize the contributions of Jewish and Australian servicemen and women. The school also commemorates Remembrance Day, where students pay tribute to service and sacrifice, with Junior School Captains laying a wreath. Year 9 History students attend the General Sir John Monash Memorial Oration and engage in fundraising for Legacy, supporting the families of Australian veterans.

To mark the Centenary of ANZAC Day, a memorial featuring a sandstone plinth and a Lone Pine tree was established with the help of a Commonwealth Government grant. The memorial was designed by former teacher George Charlton and unveiled in a ceremony with the presence of Lieutenant Colonel McGann.

The school celebrates Australia’s multicultural diversity through events like Chinese New Year and initiatives led by the Student Representative Council. Students from various backgrounds share their cultural traditions and histories, fostering an inclusive community. Public speaking competitions through organizations like Rotary, Zonta, and Apex also offer students a chance to demonstrate their engagement with the wider community.

Masada College also shows its support for national sporting events, particularly during the Olympics, by organizing Green and Gold Day celebrations. On this day, students and staff wear Australia's Olympic colors, participate in Olympic-themed activities, and celebrate the achievements of Australian athletes, encouraging school spirit and national pride.

== Co-curricular activities ==
Masada College offers co-curricular programs with academic, social, emotional, and spiritual growth:

- Debating and Public Speaking: Regular participation in interschool competitions.
- Music and Performing Arts: Opportunities include choirs, ensembles, and stage productions.
- Community Service: Strong emphasis on social responsibility and volunteerism.
- Sports Programs: Participation in both recreational and competitive sports leagues.

== Notable alumni ==
- Gavin Fingleson: South African-born Australian, Olympic silver medalist baseball player
- Adam Kellerman: Paralympic wheelchair tennis player
- Debbie Kruger: Music journalist
- Adam Alter: NYU Stern Business School Professor of the Year (2019-2020), 2x New York Times bestselling author.
- Joshua Ross and Adam McCurdie: Founders of Humanitix
- Simon Cohen: TV personality, Luxe Listings
- Samantha Brett: News reporter

== See also ==
- List of non-government schools in New South Wales
