= Deeper Water =

Studio album by Paul Kelly
- Released: 12 September 1995
- Recorded: September 1994 – June 1995
- Studios: Platinum and Periscope Studios, Melbourne
- Genre: Folk rock
- Length: 47:07
- Labels: White (AUS); Mushroom/BMG (Europe); Vanguard (US)
- Producers: Paul Kelly; Randy Jacobs; Kerryn Tolhurst; Simon Polinski

Paul Kelly chronology
Wanted Man (1994)	Deeper Water (1995)	Live at the Continental and the Esplanade (1995)

Singles from Deeper Water
- 1. "Give in to My Love" Released: October 1995; 2. "Deeper Water" Released: 1995

Deeper Water, the tenth studio album by Paul Kelly, was released on 12 September 1995 on White Label Records in Australia and on Vanguard Records in North America. It peaked at No. 40 on the ARIA Albums Chart and provided his second consecutive nomination as Best Male Artist at the ARIA Music Awards of 1996. In New Zealand Deeper Water reached No. 30 on the Official New Zealand Music Chart. Kelly issued its lead single, "Give in to My Love", in October 1995 and followed with "Deeper Water" later that year.

== Background ==
Paul Kelly started recording his tenth studio album, Deeper Water, in September 1994. Two months earlier he had released his previous studio album, Wanted Man, which includes a track co-produced and co-written with Randy Jacobs (member of Was (Not Was)). For Deeper Water, Kelly and Jacobs co-wrote the title track; and they produced and wrote two further tracks, "Extra Mile" and "I've Been a Fool". Kelly used Kerryn Tolhurst (ex-The Dingoes) as producer for "Difficult Woman" and co-produced with him on "Give in to My Love". A third co-producer, Simon Polinski (Yothu Yindi), worked on a track, "Gathering Storm", which Kelly had co-written with Mart Saarelaht (leader of Jex Saarelaht Trio). All the other tracks were produced by Kelly; for the album he used the Platinum and Periscope Studios in Melbourne.

Kelly explained the title track's symbolism: "My father taught me to swim. Four of my brothers and sisters were older than me and three younger. I couldn't wait to learn so I could join the older ones who would all rush straight up to the deep end. Deeper water to me meant danger, meant power, meant growing up ... Everytime you move through the big rituals in life it’s like a move into deeper water." One of the album tracks, "Madeleine's Song", was written for his elder daughter, Madeleine Kelly. Another track, "Difficult Woman", was written for, and recorded by, Renée Geyer on her album of the same name, which had been produced by Kelly and was released in August 1994. Geyer later used the title for her autobiography, Confessions of a Difficult Woman (April 2000).

In May 1995 Kelly formed a touring backing band with Jacobs on guitar; Stephen Hadley on bass guitar; Bruce Haymes on keyboards; Graham Lee on lap and pedal steel; and Peter Luscombe on drums. They played a series of sets at the Esplanade Hotel, their performance on 25 May was recorded live for Live at the Continental and the Esplanade (late 1995). Kelly issued Deeper Water's lead single, "Give in to My Love", in October 1995 and followed with "Deeper Water" later that year. To promote the releases he toured Australia from January in the following year.

== Reception ==
Professional ratings
Review scores
Source	Rating
AllMusic	3/5 stars
Rolling Stone	4/5 stars

The Canberra Times' Sharon Palmer noticed that "No real surprises or sounds appear on Deeper Water, however a number of songs are notable for the absence of back-up singers on them with Kelly providing all the vocals." William Ruhlmann of AllMusic opined that Kelly used "a more consistent musical style than he had employed on Wanted Man." Ruhlmann continued "most of the songs had folk-rock arrangements, and most concerned romantic subjects, within which Kelly's primary concerns were lust and betrayal." Mark Mordue writing in The Sydney Morning Herald felt that "the songs from Deeper Water have become part of our lives" displaying Kelly's "poet of the common man credentials are built on both good writing and accuracy." Mordue expanded by describing its "take on family, growing older and love also has a dark edge to it, something in the territory around the songs, that gives the album an unusual intensity and warmth."

Deeper Water peaked at No. 40 on the ARIA Albums Chart and provided his second consecutive nomination as Best Male Artist at the ARIA Music Awards of 1996. In New Zealand Deeper Water reached No. 30 on the Official New Zealand Music Chart. Neither of the singles, "Give in to My Love" and "Deeper Water", appeared on the ARIA Singles Chart top 100.

== Track listing ==
All tracks are written by Paul Kelly, except where noted

Deeper Water
No.	Title	Writer(s)	Length
1.	"Blush"		3:26
2.	"Extra Mile"	Paul Kelly, Randy Jacobs	3:37
3.	"I'll Forgive You But I Won't Forget"		3:35
4.	"Queen Stone"	Maurice Frawley, Shane Walsh	3:42
5.	"Deeper Water"	Paul Kelly, Randy Jacobs	4:33
6.	"Madeleine's Song"		3:43
7.	"Difficult Woman"		4:03
8.	"Give in to My Love"		4:07
9.	"I've Been a Fool"	Paul Kelly, Randy Jacobs	4:11
10.	"Anastasia Changes Her Mind"		3:15
11.	"California"		5:03
12.	"Gathering Storm"	Paul Kelly, Mart Saarelaht	4:17

== Personnel ==
Musicians

- Steve Hadley – bass guitar, backing vocals
- Bruce Haymes – keyboards, backing vocals
- Randy Jacobs – vocals, guitar
- Paul Kelly – vocals, guitars, harmonica
- Graham Lee – electric steel, vocals
- Peter Luscombe – drums, percussion
- Shane O'Mara – guitars

Production details

- Paul Kelly – producer (except track 7)
- Randy Jacobs – producer (tracks 2, 9)
- Kerryn Tolhurst – producer (tracks 7–8)
- Simon Polinski – producer (track 12), engineer, mixer (Platinum Studios – June 1995)
- Adam Rhodes – assistant mixer
- Don Bartley – mastering (Studios 301)

Artwork

- Debbie Ladd – design
- Jacquie Mitelman – photography

== Charts ==
Chart (1995)	Peak position
Australian Albums (ARIA)	40
New Zealand Albums (RMNZ)	30
