= Esplanade Hotel, Melbourne =

Building in Melbourne, Victoria, Australia

Esplanade Hotel
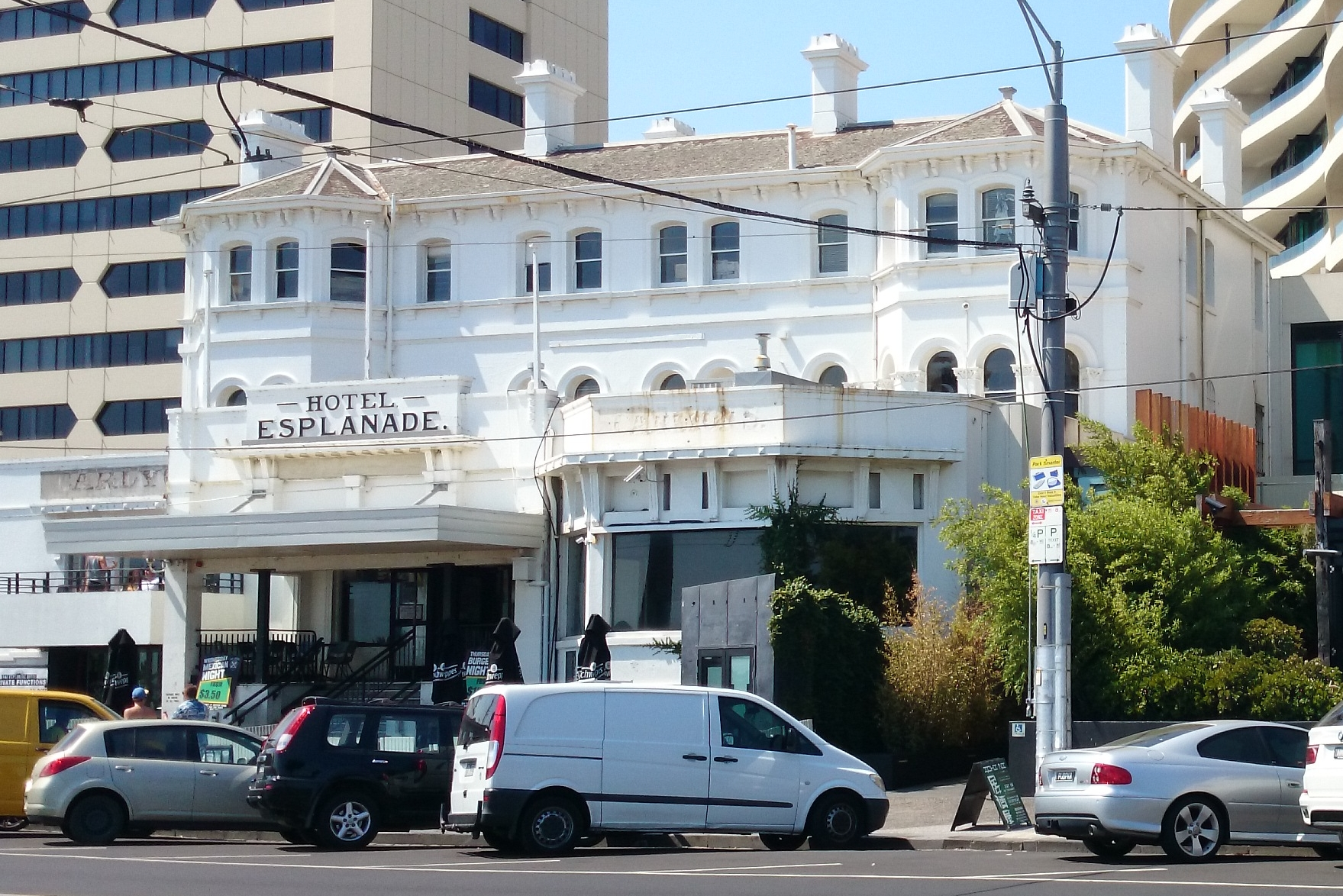

General information
- Location: 11 The Esplanade, St Kilda, Victoria, Australia
- Coordinates: 37°51′51″S 144°58′22″E
- Opened: January 7th, 1878

The Esplanade Hotel, commonly known locally as "The Espy", is a hotel and music venue in the inner bayside suburb of St Kilda, in the city of Melbourne, Victoria, Australia. Built in 1878, it overlooks Port Phillip from the Upper Esplanade. It is famed for its long history of live music, and served as the filming location for the live music trivia program Rockwiz.

== History ==
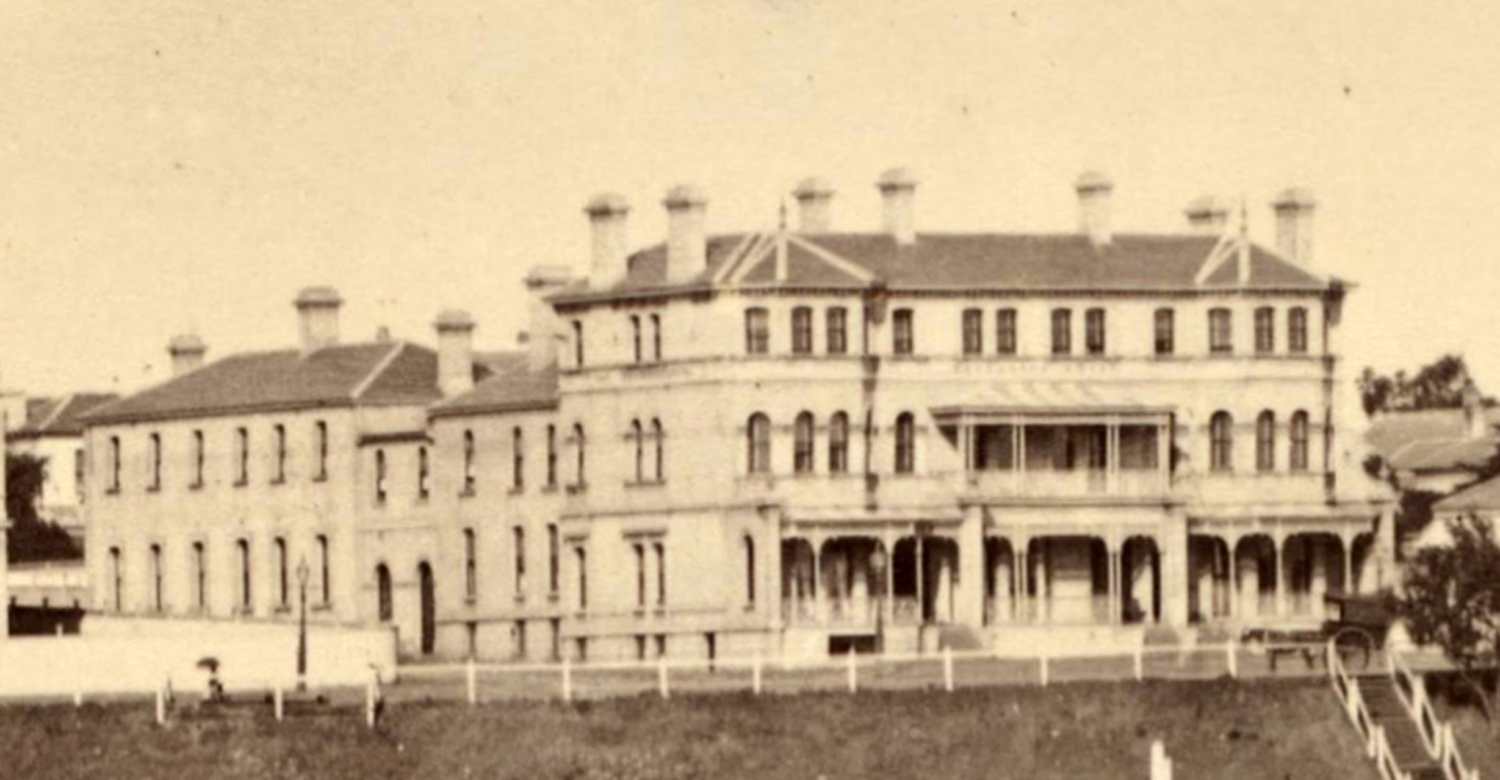
The Esplanade Hotel circa 1885

The hotel was built in 1878 and remains one of the earliest, largest and most prominent 19th-century resort hotels in Victoria. Originally intended to be three large terraces, the building was altered to become a hotel during construction, and became one of the premier hotels in Melbourne outside the city. The Esplanade Hotel provided rooms overlooking Port Phillip Bay, at a time when St Kilda was both a suburb of the wealthy, and the preferred place to partake of the waters in one of the many sea-bath establishments for both Melburnians and visitors.

The Esplanade Hotel was the home of wealthy philanthropist and National Gallery of Victoria benefactor Alfred Felton from 1892 until his death in 1904. The hotel also hosted many famous visitors, including Mark Twain in the 1880s, and actress Sarah Bernhardt in 1920.

A large dining room (later known as the Gershwin Room) in the rear wing was redecorated in Art Nouveau style in c1910.

In 1921 the hotel changed hands to become Carlyon's Esplanade Hotel, one of a chain owned by former steamboat captain and later hotelier Thomas Symington Carlyon Snr (father of former AFL player and later hotelier Thomas Symington Carlyon Jnr). Alterations were made, changing it from exclusive residential use for the wealthy to incorporate entertainment for the middle classes. A ground level extension created a much larger lounge bar, and a grand staircase and entry was added. The "Eastern Tent Ballroom" was constructed to the rear of the site, and in the early 1920s became an important jazz and dance venue, at a time when the St Kilda foreshore area was one of the main entertainment districts in Melbourne, with numerous dance halls, cinemas, baths, hotels and an ice rink. The hotel and ballroom were sold in August 1925, and in 1929 the ballroom was rebuilt as the Spanish style Baymor Court flats.

Col Jackson took on the lease in 1967 and heralded a new era in music at The Espy. In the 1970s the Gershwin Room was turned into a disco, complete with flashing Saturday Night Fever-style dance floor, and later hosted live bands, as did the front bar, dubbed the Nimrod Room. From the 70s and through the 1980s and 90s, live music on up to three stages was an almost every night occurrence, as the Espy became one of the major venues of Melbourne's vibrant live music scene. By the 1980s, the upper floor guest rooms had been abandoned, and by the 1990s the Baymor Court flats were unused as well. The Esplanade Hotel was classified by the National Trust of Australia in October 1990.

The hotel was bought by Carlton and United Breweries in 1995 and then sold to Becton Corporation in 1997 with plans to develop a large residential and retail complex on the site. Becton's proposal for a 35 storey residential complex behind a partly retained hotel resulted in 9,000 residents registering objections and the trade union movement threatening to boycott construction if the pub was demolished. Community opposition supported the Espy's role in Melbourne culture and independent music scene. The eventual compromise was a lower 10 storey apartment building to the rear and side replacing rear wings, a yard, the Baymor Court flats and the bottle shop, separate from the main part of the hotel building.

In 2001, Becton put out to tender the sale of a 200 year lease for the separated Espy Hotel. The community based Lewis/Comey/Esplanade Alliance bid was pipped by former nightclub operators Paul Adamo and Vince Sofo (who previously owned the popular Chevron nightclub in Chapel Street). Following some refurbishment the Gershwin Room at the rear reopened for live bands in 2004 and became home for the SBS television show Rockwiz. In 2006 the apartment development, designed by Fender Katsalidis, was completed. Adamo and Sofo attempted to sell the lease in early 2014, without success. They closed the hotel suddenly on 17 May 2015, with the stated intention of refurbishment, but no work happened, with only the Gershwin Room used occasionally for special gigs.

In May 2017, The Espy was sold yet again, to Melbourne-based hospitality group Sand Hill Road, who have operated and redeveloped licensed venues since 2000. After an extensive renovation, a transformed Espy reopened in November 2018, with three live music or performance stages, numerous bars and restaurants, finally renovating and reusing all four floors, and the basement.

In August 2022, The Espy was sold to KKR, a US-based private equity company. According to a report in The Australian on 3 Aug 2022 "The famed US company, which is the backer of local outfit Australian Venue Co. that has taken over the iconic venue, has been chasing it since before the pandemic struck.

The KKR-backed company has just finalised a deal to acquire Espy owner the Sand Hill Road pub group for about $100m."

== Music ==
The Esplanade Hotel is reputed to be the longest continuously running live music venue in Australia. In May 1995, Paul Kelly recorded tracks for his album, Live at the Continental and the Esplanade (1996), in the hotel's Gershwin Room. Since 2005, the SBS music quiz show RocKwiz has been filmed in the same room. Show host Julia Zemiro used to work at the hotel as a waitress.

== See also ==
- RocKwiz
- Music of Melbourne
