= From St Kilda to Kings Cross =

1985 single by Paul Kelly

Single by Paul Kelly

from the album Post
- A-side: "From St Kilda to Kings Cross"
- B-side: "Blues for Skip"
- Released: April 1985
- Recorded: January–February 1985; Silverwood Studios, Sydney
- Genre: Folk rock
- Length: 2:53
- Label: White
- Songwriter: Paul Kelly
- Producers: Paul Kelly, Clive Shakespeare

Paul Kelly singles chronology
"Rocking Institution"	"From St Kilda to Kings Cross" (1985)	"Before Too Long" (1986)

Audio sample
- "From St Kilda to Kings Cross": file; help

"From St Kilda to Kings Cross" is a song performed and written by Australian musician Paul Kelly. The title refers to inner city suburbs St Kilda in Melbourne and Kings Cross in Sydney. It was released in April 1985 as the only single from Kelly's first solo album Post. The single did not chart on the Australian Kent Music Report Singles Chart. The song has found later acclaim with it appearing on lists for 'Top 20 Sydney Songs' and 'Top 25 Melbourne Songs'. The track has been recorded by other artists including Bob Evans' version on Before Too Long (November 2009) – a Paul Kelly tribute album.

== Composition and background ==
In late 1984 Paul Kelly wrote "From St Kilda to Kings Cross" on Don Walker's piano while living at Walker's Kings Cross flat. Kelly had met Walker (Cold Chisel keyboardist and songwriter) through his ex-wife's sister. Kelly started composing the song as a blues variation on "From Four Until Late" by Robert Johnson, which contains the lines "From Memphis to Norfolk is a 36-hour ride / A man is like a prisoner and he's never satisfied." By using Walker's piano the composition shifted to include the influence of "Never Going Back" by The Lovin' Spoonful. The song was released as a single in April 1985 but did not appear on the Australian Kent Music Report Singles Chart. The single's cover depicts a "black and pink image of Paul's face" on the White Records imprint by Mushroom Records. The song was written in a bleak period in Kelly's life: after the break-up of his band and his marriage, he had moved from Melbourne to Sydney in late 1984. In the biographical notes distributed to the media when Post was released, Kelly advised that in 1984 he packed all his worldly goods in a trailer, borrowed his father-in-law's Holden and drove from St Kilda to Kings Cross. During the second week of recording Post with Clive Shakespeare (ex-Sherbet guitarist) co-producing, Kelly recorded the track and he had a heavy cold which affected his voice but "seemed to suit the track". In 2000, he recalled working on it:

The Go-Betweens, the Triffids were really big influences ... the Saints. "From St. Kilda to Kings Cross" was a fairly early song for me. I felt that I was on to something and it was ... I was very aware that it was more like a Chuck Berry song where you named names and places – you named sounds and cities. I thought that was interesting to get words into songs that people hadn't got in before.

Allmusic's Mike De Gagne was not impressed by the track, he felt "this Aussie loves his homeland. With regional reference titles like 'From St. Kilda to King's Cross' and 'Adelaide,' his inclusion of cities and towns seem to gather too much detail, familiar to only those who reside down under". "From St Kilda to Kings Cross" was used as the B-side of Paul Kelly & the Messengers' 1991 single, "Don't Start Me Talking". This version was released on their 1992 album Hidden Things. It later appeared on Kelly's first compilation album, Songs from the South in June 1997.

== Later appreciation ==
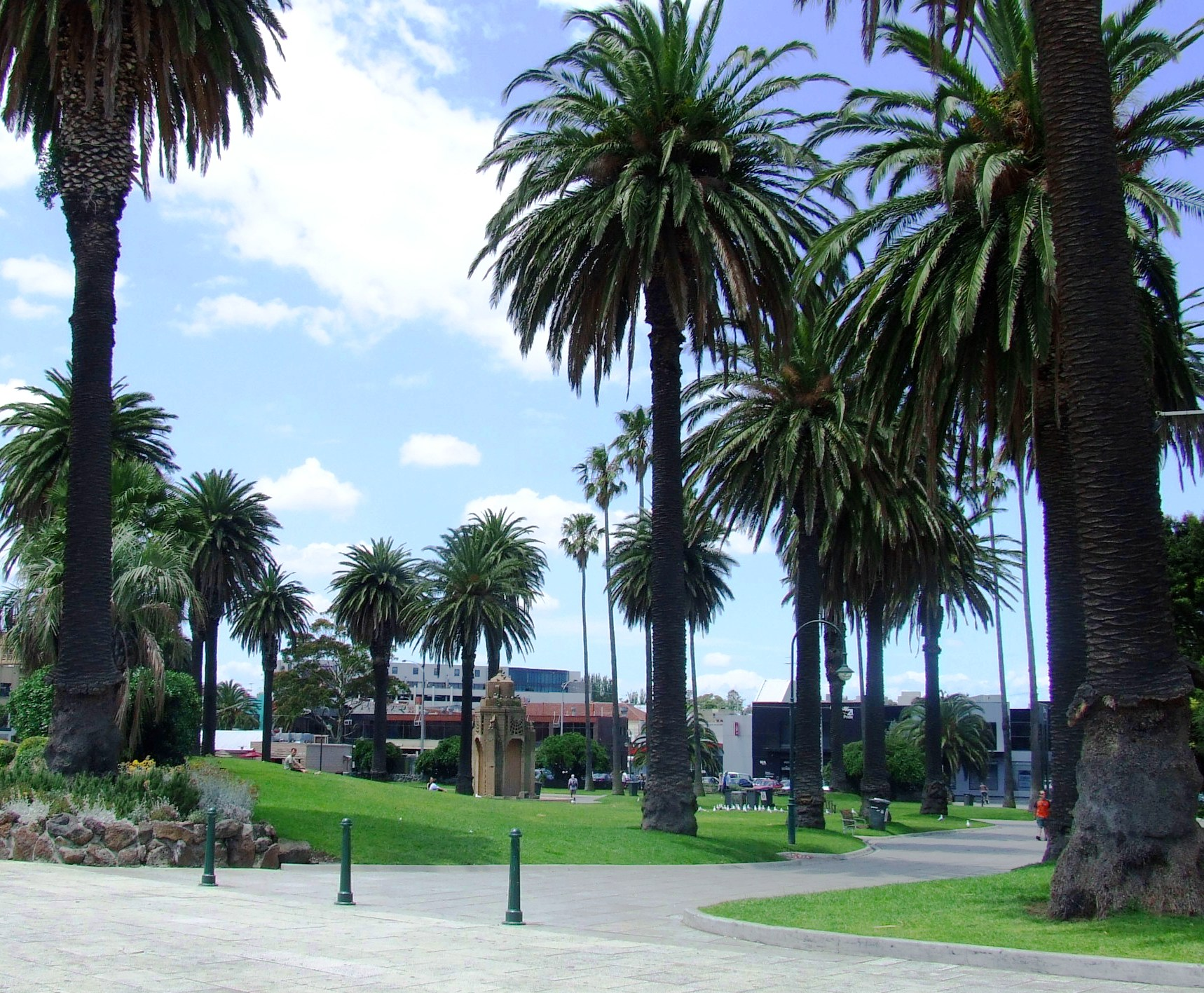
Palm trees, St Kilda Esplanade

ABC Radio's Richard Fidler has described "From St Kilda to Kings Cross" as "embedded in our [Australian] cultural psyche". In 2004 the song was listed by The Sydney Morning Herald's Bernard Zuel in his "top 20 Sydney songs", and of "immortalising" Kings Cross in particular.

Conversely, it has also been described as an "iconic anthem" about St Kilda. In August 2004, according to a panel of writers for The Age, it is one of "The Top 25 Melbourne Songs". The song's lyrics "I want to see the sun go down from St Kilda Esplanade / Where the beach needs reconstruction, where the palm trees have it hard", have been mentioned in relation to proposed re-developments of the foreshore of St Kilda, especially in reference to the palm trees on St Kilda Esplanade.

In April 2006, the Melbourne Scottish Fiddle Club released a cover version on their album, A Long Way from Home, which was broadcast on The Coodabeens programme on ABC Local Radio with Billy Baxter compering – Kelly had written a 1980 hit about him, "Billy Baxter". In October 2009, Gomez members Tom Gray and Paul Blackburn performed the song on the "Like a Version" segment of Triple J's Breakfast Show. In November that year, Bob Evans (aka Kevin Mitchell of Jebediah) performed "From St Kilda to Kings Cross" at two Triple J concerts, Before Too Long, in tribute of Kelly, which was released as a triple-CD of the same name.

== Track listing ==
From St Kilda to Kings Cross
No.	Title	Writer(s)	Length
1.	"From St Kilda to Kings Cross"	Paul Kelly	2:53
2.	"Blues for Skip"	Paul Kelly	3:07
Total length:			6:00

== Personnel ==
Credits:

Musicians

- Paul Kelly – vocals, acoustic guitar
- Steve Connolly – lead guitar, harmonies
- Michael Barclay – harmonies
- Chris Coyne – saxophone

Production work

- Producer – Clive Shakespeare, Paul Kelly
- Engineer – Clive Shakespeare

== Certifications ==
Region	Certification	Certified units/sales
Australia (ARIA)	Gold	35,000^{‡}
^{‡} Sales+streaming figures based on certification alone.

== Release history ==
Format	Country	Label	Catalogue No.	Year
7" single	AUS	White Label	K-9666	April 1985
