= Wanted Man (Paul Kelly album) =

Studio album by Paul Kelly
- Released: July 1994
- Recorded: 1993
- Studio: Stagg St, Clearlake, O'Henry, Los Angeles; Metropolis, Melbourne
- Genre: Folk rock
- Length: 49:08
- Label: Mushroom/White, Vanguard, Demon
- Producer: Paul Kelly; Randy Jacobs; David Bridie

Paul Kelly chronology
Seven Deadly Sins (1993)	Wanted Man (1994)	Deeper Water (1995)

Singles from Wanted Man
- 1. "Song from the Sixteenth Floor" Released: January 1994; 2. "Love Never Runs on Time" Released: 16 May 1994; 3. "God's Hotel" Released: September 1994

Wanted Man is a folk rock album by Paul Kelly and was originally released in July 1994. It was issued on Mushroom Records in Australia and was Kelly's first solo studio album after disbanding his previous group, The Messengers. Tracks 1–10 were recorded at three Los Angeles studios while tracks 11–13 were recorded in Melbourne. It was produced by Kelly, Randy Jacobs and David Bridie. The cover art for Wanted Man is a colophon rendering of Australia's legendary outlaw Ned Kelly (no relation) as a guitarist and was painted by David Band.

The album peaked at No. 11 on the ARIA Albums Chart and resulted in Kelly being nominated for 'Best Male Artist' at the ARIA Music Awards of 1995. Three singles were issued from the album, "Song from the Sixteenth Floor", "Love Never Runs on Time" and "God's Hotel" (co-written with Nick Cave) – but none reached the ARIA Singles Chart.

== Background ==
Paul Kelly's first solo studio album after disbanding Paul Kelly & The Messengers was Wanted Man. The group had given their last performance in August 1991, and Kelly resumed his solo career. He justified his decision: "We forged a style together. But I felt if we had kept going it would have got formulaic and that's why I broke it up. I wanted to try and start moving into other areas, start mixing things up". Kelly's first post-Messengers solo release was the live double CD Live, May 1992, released in November 1992. Kelly had already relocated to Los Angeles and signed with Vanguard Records to tour the US as a solo artist. While in Los Angeles he produced fellow Australian Renée Geyer's album Difficult Woman (1994).

== Recording and composition ==
In late 1992, when living in Los Angeles, Kelly recorded ten tracks for his next album, Wanted Man, at three studios: Stagg St, Clearlake and O'Henry. Kelly returned to Australia in 1993 and had a book collection of lyrics published, aptly titled Lyrics. In Melbourne he recorded three more tracks at the Metropolis Studio. The album was produced by Kelly, Randy Jacobs (member of Was (Not Was)) and David Bridie (produced My Friend the Chocolate Cake's 1991 self-titled album). Jacobs and Kelly co-wrote "Ball and Chain". The first track, "Summer Rain", deals with a man's yearning for his girlfriend, Kelly thought the sentiment would translate well but found a curious Belgian interviewer asked, "But why would anybody long for rain in summer? ... We get enough rain in winter. We don't want the summer rain. We want the sunshine". The lead single, "Songs from the Sixteenth Floor" was written by Kelly with John Clifforth of Deckchairs Overboard. The next single, "Love Never Runs on Time" was written by Kelly. The lyrics describe a truck driver struggling to meet his commitments to work and family. Kelly uses the same protagonist from "To Her Door" on 1987's Under the Sun and then again in 1996's "How to Make Gravy" from the extended play How to Make Gravy. In the first song, the man moves from being newly married to having children and problems with a drug addiction and undergoing rehab to returning to the family home. By the time of "How to Make Gravy", the man is in prison for assault and is writing a letter to his brother for Christmas. In 2002 Debbie Kruger of Australasian Performing Right Association (APRA) interviewed Kelly and found, "Kelly’s attraction to the theatrical, however unconscious, has meant occasionally a song’s character will pop up again, sometimes unintentionally". Kelly conceded the three songs were linked, "'I’ve got a feeling it's the same guy. He keeps coming back'. Maybe he'll be in a happier place next time? 'Yeah, he's a bit of a fuck-up, that guy', Kelly laughs".

The final single, "God's Hotel" was co-written with Nick Cave. Kelly had read Cave's book of lyrics, King Ink (1988), and found "God's Hotel". When interviewing Cave for a newspaper article in The Age, Kelly asked about the lyrics, Cave said "It's just a blues ... You can use the words if you want". Kelly only used five of twelve verses and adapted the tune from the chords of "Bittersweet" by Hoodoo Gurus. "Everybody Wants to Touch Me" describes how a pregnant woman becomes the object of curiosity, wonder or revulsion, although some believe the song relates to a celebrity being the centre of attention (see Paul Kapsis' cover version). In 2000 Kelly's friend Deborah Conway recorded her version for The Women at the Well tribute album. Kelly noted "I don't like all covers of my songs but I have to say this one's awesome. Absolutely". "Lately" was co-written with Geyer and followed their work on the soundtrack for the ABC-TV mini series The Seven Deadly Sins, Geyer and Kelly sang alongside Vika Bull and Conway for the 13 tracks. The cover art for Wanted Man is a colophon rendering of Australia's legendary outlaw Ned Kelly (no relation) as a guitarist and was painted by David Band.

== Reception and charting ==
Professional ratings
Review scores
Source	Rating
Allmusic	2.5/5 stars
Rolling Stone	4.5/5 stars

Wanted Man peaked at No. 11 on the ARIA Albums Chart and resulted in Kelly being nominated for 'Best Male Artist' at the ARIA Music Awards of 1995. Three singles were issued from the album, "Song from the Sixteenth Floor" (January 1994), "Love Never Runs on Time" (May) and "God's Hotel" (September) – but none reached the ARIA Singles Chart.

Rolling Stone's Paul Corio observed that having Ned Kelly on the cover "makes perfect sense. Keeping a low profile Down Under, Paul Kelly periodically emerges with albums that raid the storehouse of critical praise, then he retreats to mine poetic gold". Corio felt the music was "folk, reggae, midtempo rock, jazz-inflected pop and hard-edged ballads – Kelly swings them all deftly". Allmusic's William Ruhlmann was less favourable and said "[it] was familiar folk-rock, with Kelly singing romantic lyrics over acoustic and electric guitars and a rhythm section. Wanted Man was less ambitious lyrically than some of Kelly's earlier albums".

== Track listing ==
All tracks are written by Paul Kelly, unless otherwise indicated

Wanted Man
No.	Title	Writer(s)	Length
1.	"Summer Rain"		2:42
2.	"God's Hotel"	Nick Cave, Paul Kelly	5:09
3.	"She's Rare"		4:20
4.	"Just Like Animals"		4:39
5.	"Love Never Runs on Time"		2:57
6.	"Song from the Sixteenth Floor"	John Clifforth, Paul Kelly	3:57
7.	"Maybe This Time for Sure"		2:54
8.	"Ball and Chain"	Randy Jacobs, Paul Kelly	3:50
9.	"You're Still Picking the Same Sore"		3:35
10.	"Everybody Wants to Touch Me"		3:05
11.	"We've Started a Fire"		5:12
12.	"Lately"	Renée Geyer, Paul Kelly	3:30
13.	"Nukkanya"		3:18

== Personnel ==
Paul Kelly's backing band members

- Paul Kelly – lead vocals, acoustic guitar
- Peter Luscombe – drums
- Bill McDonald – bass guitar
- Shane O'Mara – lead guitar

Musicians (Tracks 1–11)

- Sweet Pea Atkinson – backing vocals
- David Bridie – backing vocals
- Harry Bowens – backing vocals
- Linda Bull – backing vocals
- Vika Bull – backing vocals
- John Molo – drums, percussion
- Debra Dobkin – backing vocals
- John Gilutin – piano
- James "Hutch" Hutchinson – bass guitar
- Randy Jacobs – backing vocals
- Robert Lloyd
- Ian McLagan – keyboards
- Helen Mountfort
- Archie Roach – backing vocals
- Paul Williamson

Recording details

- Producer – Paul Kelly, Randy Jacobs, David Bridie
- Engineer – Terry Becker, Richard Bosworth, Tony Cohen, Warren Croyle, Mark Linett, Simon Polinski
  - Assistant engineer – Bruce Curnow, Tim Johnston, Jeff Shannon
- Mastering – Alan Yoshida
- Mixer – Terry Becker, Tony Cohen, Simon Polinski

Artwork

- David Band – artwork (paintings, direction)
- Christopher Holt – typography

== Charts ==
Chart (1994)	Peak position
Australian Albums (ARIA)	11
New Zealand Albums (RMNZ)	19
