= Careless (song) =

Single by Paul Kelly and the Messengers

from the album So Much Water So Close to Home
- B-side: "Special Treatment"
- Released: 23 October 1989
- Recorded: February–March 1989
- Studio: Trafalgar Studios, Sydney
- Genre: Rock
- Length: 2:54
- Label: Mushroom
- Songwriter: Paul Kelly
- Producers: Scott Litt, Paul Kelly

Paul Kelly and the Messengers singles chronology
"Sweet Guy" (1989)	"Careless" (1989)	"Most Wanted Man in the World" (1990)

"Careless" is a song by Australian rock group Paul Kelly and the Messengers, released in October 1989 as the second single from their 1989 studio album, So Much Water So Close to Home. The song was written by Kelly and co-produced with Scott Litt. The single was released in October 1989 on the Mushroom Records label. It peaked at number 116 on the ARIA singles chart. The song was later covered by Renée Geyer on Difficult Woman (1994), Angie Hart on Women at the Well (2002), and Ozi Batla (MC for The Herd) on Before Too Long (2010).

== Background ==
Paul Kelly had formed Paul Kelly and the Coloured Girls in 1985, named from a line in Lou Reed's "Walk on the Wild Side". The Coloured Girls were Michael Barclay on drums and backing vocals, Peter Bull on keyboards, Steve Connolly on lead guitar and Jon Schofield on bass guitar. For international releases from 1987 they used the name Paul Kelly and the Messengers to avoid possible racist interpretations. In August 1989 after two albums the group issued, So Much Water So Close to Home under the band name Paul Kelly and the Messengers in all markets. The album peaked at No. 10 on the ARIA Albums Chart. It was recorded in the United States with Scott Litt, best known for his work with R.E.M., co-producing with Kelly. Litt had re-mixed some of Paul Kelly and the Coloured Girls' earlier tracks for their US releases as by Paul Kelly and the Messengers. So Much Water So Close to Home was released on Mushroom/White Records in Australia and A&M Records in the US and Europe. "Sweet Guy" was the first single from the album and peaked at number 53 on the ARIA singles chart. "Careless" was the second single from the album, but failed to chart on the ARIA top 100 singles chart. It peaked at number 92, however, on the Kent Music Report chart

The video for "Careless" was directed by Kimble Rendall (XL Capris, Hoodoo Gurus, The Angels, Cold Chisel) and features Kelly and his band performing the song around an open fire, interdispersed with film from a wedding video. In May 1992 Kelly recorded a live version for his solo concert performance at the Athenaeum Theatre for the VHS album Paul Kelly Live at the Athenaeum, May 1992 (1992). It was directed and produced by Mat Humphrey. A related 2× CD album Live, May 1992 also included "Careless". In 2004 Paul Kelly and the Boon Companions performed the track for the DVD, Ways & Means, in the section subtitled Live in Boston. Kelly and his nephew Dan Kelly recorded the song as part of Kelly's A – Z Tours from 2004 to 2010, it was issued on the 8× CD album, The A – Z Recordings (2010).

Since its release, it has been covered by Renée Geyer on Difficult Woman (1994) – Kelly produced her album, also wrote the title song, "Sweet Guy" and "Foggy Highway". In 2002, Angie Hart (ex-Frente!) performed it on Women at the Well, a Kelly tribute album by female artists. Ozi Batla (MC for The Herd) sang both "Careless" and "Sydney From a 727" for the Kelly tribute show and related album, Before Too Long (2010). The song also appeared on the soundtrack to the 1990 Australian film, Weekend with Kate.

== Composition ==
"Careless" is a song with a length of two minutes and fifty-four seconds. The song is set in the key of G major and has a medium tempo with a piano range of G_{2}–B_{4} and a vocal range of F♯_{4}–B_{4}. Kelly is credited with both lyrics and music.

Kelly adjusted the chords for The Go-Betweens' track, "Apology Accepted", from Liberty Belle and the Black Diamond Express (1986) and "came up with the tune... [It's] a circle song, with a progression of chords cycling in the same order... The melody may change for the chorus but the chords don't. There is no 'new bit', no change-up via a bridge or middle eight, no modulation". He also acknowledges that the chorus to the song uses the same two notes as the closing refrain on The Go-Between's "Cattle and Cane".

"Special Treatment" is a protest song that Kelly wrote highlighting the oppression of Australian Aborigines. "Special Treatment" was composed in response to claims by a Western Australian pastoralist that Aborigines receive better treatment than other Australians. "'Special Treatment' is another one like that, a specific situation and write to it..." Kelly's song wryly spells out what that the special treatment has actually meant.

== Reception ==
Allmusic's Mike DeGagne liked "Everything's Turning to White" and "Sweet Guy" from So Much Water So Close to Home, he observed they were "[t]wo of Paul Kelly's best written tunes ... nestled in amongst the others here... some of the other tunes seem a little weak in the content department". Although not specifically mentioned, "Careless" is one of the other tracks on the album.

== Track listing ==
1. "Careless" (Paul Kelly) – 2:54
2. "Special Treatment" (Kelly) – 3:11

== Personnel ==
Paul Kelly and the Messengers

- Michael Barclay – drums, backing vocals
- Peter Bull – keyboards
- Steve Connolly – lead guitar
- Paul Kelly – guitar, vocals, harmonica
- Jon Schofield – bass guitar

Recording details – "Careless"

- Producer – Scott Litt, Paul Kelly
- Engineer – Scott Litt
  - Assistant – Clif Norrell, Jim Dineen
- Studio – Ocean Way Studios, Los Angeles
  - Mastered – Precision Lacquer
  - Mixed – The Grey Room

Recording details – "Special Treatment"

- Producer – Neale Sandbach
- Engineer – Neale Sandbach
- Studio – ABC Studio 22 for Blah Blah Blah

== Charts ==
Chart (1989)	Peak position
Australia (ARIA Charts)	116

== Certifications ==
Region	Certification	Certified units/sales
Australia (ARIA)	Gold	35,000^{‡}
^{‡} Sales+streaming figures based on certification alone.
