= Before Too Long =

- 7" single cover

Single by Paul Kelly and the Coloured Girls

from the album Gossip
- B-side: "White Train"
- Released: 30 June 1986
- Recorded: April 1986
- Studio: Trafalgar Studios, Sydney
- Genre: Rock
- Length: 3:20
- Label: White Label
- Songwriter: Paul Kelly
- Producers: Alan Thorne, Paul Kelly

Paul Kelly and the Coloured Girls singles chronology
| "From St Kilda to Kings Cross" (1985) | "Before Too Long" (1986) | "Darling It Hurts" (1986) |

"Before Too Long"
- 7" single picture sleeve cover

"Before Too Long" is a song by Australian rock group Paul Kelly and the Coloured Girls, released as the first single from their debut double album, Gossip. It was released in June 1986 on the original White Label Records, a subsidiary of Mushroom Records. It reached No. 15 on the Australian Kent Music Report Singles Chart, remaining for 19 weeks. The track was a surprise hit for Kelly at a time when chart success had eluded him and provided increased interest for the release of Gossip, which would become his biggest mainstream success to that date.

The success of the single can partly be attributed to the accompanying video, which was directed by John Witteron, depicting Kelly as a long-suffering cab driver dealing with a night shift full of eccentric passengers.

At the 1986 Countdown Australian Music Awards the song was nominated for Best Male Performance in a Video and Best Single, losing out to John Farnham's "You're the Voice" in both categories.

In January 2018, as part of Triple M's "Ozzest 100", the 'most Australian' songs of all time, "Before Too Long" was ranked number 79.

== Background ==
After recording his solo album, Post in early 1985, Paul Kelly established a full-time band in Sydney. It included Michael Armiger (bass guitar, rhythm guitar), Michael Barclay (drums, ex-Weddings, Parties, Anything) and Steve Connolly (lead guitar). Bass guitarist Jon Schofield and keyboardist Peter Bull soon joined. Through a joke based on Lou Reed's song "Walk on the Wild Side", the band became known as Paul Kelly and the Coloured Girls. Armiger left and the Coloured Girls line-up stabilised in late 1985 as Barclay, Bull, Connolly and Schofield.

In April 1986, the band entered Trafalgar Studios and released their debut 24-track double LP, Gossip in September. It included remakes of four songs from Post. Gossip peaked at No. 15 on the Australian Kent Music Report Albums Chart. Charting singles from the album were "Before Too Long", released in June ahead of the album, which peaked at No. 15 on the related Singles Chart and "Darling It Hurts". "Before Too Long" was written by Kelly; its success is partly due to the accompanying video, which was directed by John Witteron, depicting Kelly as a long-suffering cab driver dealing with a night shift full of eccentric passengers.

A trimmed version of Gossip, featuring 15 tracks on a single LP, was released in the United States by A&M Records in July 1987. Allmusic's Mike DeGagne noted that "[it] bursts at the seams with blustery, distinguished tunes captivating both the somberness and the intrigue thrown forward from this fine Australian storyteller".

The album was co-produced by Kelly with Alan Thorne (Hoodoo Gurus, The Stems) who, according to music journalist Robert Forster (former The Go-Betweens singer-songwriter), helped the band create "a sound that will not only influence future roots-rock bands but, through its directness, sparkle and dedication to the song, will also come to be seen as particularly Australian. Ultimately, it means the records these people made together are timeless".

Due to possible racist connotations, the band changed its name for international releases to "Paul Kelly and the Messengers". They made a US tour, initially supporting Crowded House and then headlining, travelling across the US by bus. The New York Times rock critic Jon Pareles wrote "Mr. Kelly sang one smart, catchy three-minute song after another – dozens of them – as the band played with no-frills directness" following the band's performance at the Bottom Line Club in New York.

Paul Kelly and the Coloured Girls' second album, Under the Sun, was released in late 1987 in Australia and New Zealand; and early 1988 in North America and Europe (under the name Paul Kelly and the Messengers). On the Kent Music Report Albums Chart it reached No. 19 with the lead single "To Her Door", written by Kelly, peaking at No. 14 on the related singles chart.

== Track listing ==
1. "Before Too Long" (Paul Kelly) – 3:20
2. "White Train" (Kelly) – 2:41

== Personnel ==
Paul Kelly and the Coloured Girls

- Michael Barclay – drums, backing vocals
- Peter Bull – keyboards, backing vocals
- Steve Connolly – guitar, backing vocals
- Paul Kelly – acoustic guitar, lead vocals
- John Schofield – bass guitar, backing vocals

Additional musicians

- Astrid Munday – backing vocals

Production details

- Producer – Alan Thorne, Paul Kelly
- Engineer – Alan Thorne
- Studio – Trafalgar Studios, Sydney

Art work

- Cover art – Ann Richmond (picture sleeve)

== Charts ==
=== Weekly charts ===
| Chart (1986) | Peak position |
|---|---|
| Australia (Kent Music Report) | 15 |

=== Year-end charts ===
| Chart (1986) | Position |
|---|---|
| Australia (Kent Music Report) | 98 |

== Certifications ==
| Region | Certification | Certified units/sales |
|---|---|---|
| Australia (ARIA) | 2× Platinum | 140,000^{‡} |
^{‡} Sales+streaming figures based on certification alone.
