= Jon Schofield =

Australian musician

Jon Schofield is an Australian musician (bass guitar, guitar and vocals) who has played in a range of bands from indie rock 1960s inspired band, Grooveyard, to The Coloured Girls (a.k.a. The Messengers) of Paul Kelly & the Coloured Girls.

== Biography ==
Schofield played in Grooveyard from 1982 to 1984, then Chinless Elite in 1985 and with Paul Kelly and the Coloured Girls/ Paul Kelly and the Messengers during Kelly's commercially successful period in the mid to late 1980s.

Schofield has also been involved in production for the Red Eye label producing the debut EP for The Mexican Spitfires, Lupe Velez.
