= Post (Paul Kelly album) =

Studio album by Paul Kelly
- Released: May 1985
- Recorded: January–February 1985
- Studios: Silverwood Studios, Sydney
- Genre: Acoustic
- Label: White Label / Mushroom
- Producers: Clive Shakespeare, Paul Kelly

Paul Kelly chronology
Manila (1982)	Post (1985)	Gossip (1986)

Singles from Post
- 1. "From St Kilda to Kings Cross" Released: April 1985

Post is the first solo album by Australian singer-songwriter rock musician Paul Kelly. Kelly had moved to Sydney by January 1985, after leaving his Melbourne-based Paul Kelly Band and the breakup of his marriage to Hilary Brown.

The album was produced by Clive Shakespeare (Sherbet guitarist) and Kelly, and was released in May 1985 by the independent White Records label, leased to Mushroom Records. The album failed to chart in Australia, with only one single, "From St Kilda to Kings Cross", released in April which also failed to chart. The name of the album, Post relates to both being 'after' significant changes in Kelly's life and to the sense of a 'signpost' to future directions. Kelly dedicated the album to Paul Hewson, keyboardist and songwriter for New Zealand/Australian band Dragon who had died of a heroin overdose in January. Kelly has described Post as a concept album dealing with addictions – not necessarily heroin addiction – but various forms, he has also denied that the songs were autobiographical but that he wrote about the world around him.

== Background ==
"From St Kilda to Kings Cross"
Paul Kelly's first solo single, "From St Kilda to Kings Cross", was released in April 1985. Ahead of his debut album, Post.

Paul Kelly and the Dots, had released two albums in the early 1980s, Talk and Manila, but they had little chart success. Kelly had become involved with the Melbourne drug culture, the Dots disbanded in 1982 after numerous line-up changes and Kelly formed the Paul Kelly Band. Kelly's first marriage, to Hilary Brown, had broken up in late 1984; likewise the Paul Kelly Band had ended too. Kelly had moved to Sydney by January 1985, where he recorded Post in the studio of Sherbet guitarist Clive Shakespeare. It was self-funded (at a cost of $3,500), with Michael Barclay on drums and guitarist Steve Connolly (The Zimmerman), guest performers on the album included bass player Ian Rilen (Rose Tattoo, X), Peter Bull (Flaming Hands, Grooveyard) on keyboards and guitarist Graham Lee. They spent two weeks recording at Clive Shakespeare's studio, Shakespeare engineered the album and co-produced with Kelly, it was released in May 1985 on the independent label White Label Records, and licensed to Mushroom Records.

The term 'post' has a few layers of meaning for Kelly in this album, i.e. post Kelly's childhood and youth in Adelaide, post his life in Melbourne, particularly post his involvement with the Melbourne drug culture, post the death of his musician friend, Paul Hewson. Kelly dedicated the album to Hewson, who was a keyboard player and songwriter for the Australian/New Zealand band, Dragon, he died of a heroin overdose in January 1985. 'Post' also relates to a marker or 'signpost', pointing to a new direction, and even a way to 'post' his account of the world. Kelly has described Post as a concept album dealing with addictions – not necessarily heroin addiction – but various forms, he has also denied that the songs were autobiographical but that he wrote about the world around him. The album was re-released in 1990 as one of Mushroom's Midprice Masters and was re-released again in 2006 by Mushroom.

== Reception ==
Professional ratings
Review scores
Source	Rating
Allmusic	2/5 stars

According to Australian rock music historian, Ian McFarlane, Post is a stark, personal collection of acoustic songs that highlight Kelly's broadly based song writing skill. Australian Rolling Stone magazine hailed Post as the best record of 1985. Both the album and the one single released from it, "From St Kilda to Kings Cross", failed to chart. The album is thought by some critics to be more of a demo recording, as four tracks were re-recorded by Paul Kelly and the Coloured Girls for their debut album Gossip in 1986. However, according to others it is like Bruce Springsteen’s Nebraska, where there is a beauty and delicateness in this raw production, with the emphasis on the words, the melodies, the song structures that are the defining elements of Kelly as a songwriter.

== Track listing ==
Post
No.	Title	Writer(s)	Length
1.	"From St Kilda to Kings Cross"	Paul Kelly	2:55
2.	"Incident on South Dowling" (later re-recorded for Paul Kelly and the Coloured Girls' 1986 album, Gossip)	Paul Kelly	2:51
3.	"Look So Fine, Feel So Low" (later re-recorded for Paul Kelly and the Coloured Girls' 1986 album, Gossip)	Paul Kelly, Maurice Frawley	3:17
4.	"White Train" (later re-recorded for Paul Kelly and the Coloured Girls' 1986 album, Gossip)	Paul Kelly	3:03
5.	"Luck"	Paul Kelly	3:17
6.	"Blues for Skip"	Paul Kelly	3:09
7.	"Adelaide" (later re-recorded for Paul Kelly and the Coloured Girls' 1986 album, Gossip)	Paul Kelly	3:38
8.	"Satisfy Your Woman"	Paul Kelly	4:25
9.	"You Can Put Your Shoes under My Bed"	Paul Kelly	3:54
10.	"Standing on the Street of Early Sorrows"	Paul Kelly	4:25
11.	"Little Decisions"	Paul Kelly	3:17

== Personnel ==
- Paul Kelly – guitar, vocals
- Steve Connolly – guitar
- Michael Barclay – drums

Additional musicians

- Chris Coyne – saxophone (tenor) (tracks 1 & 9)
- Ian Rilen – bass guitar (track 2)
- Peter Bull – keyboards (tracks 8, 9 & 11)
- Graham Lee – electric 12 string guitar (track 8), Dobro guitar (track 10)
- Toni Allayis – vocals (track 11)
- Jimmy Niven – piano accordion (track 11)

Recording details

- Producer – Clive Shakespeare, Paul Kelly
- Engineer – Clive Shakespeare

Art work

- Cover, Sleeve Design – Yanni Stumbles
- Photography – Francince McDougall, Laurie Markham, Tom Takacs
