= Debbie Kruger =

Australian journalist

- Born: Sydney, New South Wales, Australia
- Occupations: Journalist, writer
- Writing career
- Subjects: Rock music, popular culture
- Notable work: Songwriters Speak
- Website: www.debbiekruger.com

Debbie Kruger is an Australian music journalist and pop-culture writer. She wrote Songwriters Speak in August 2005, which contains interviews with 45 Australian and New Zealand songwriters about their craft. Kruger was the Sydney correspondent for weekly entertainment newspaper, Variety, for three years with the moniker of krug. She works in public relations with her company Kruger PRofiles and in radio broadcasting, she has also worked as Manager of Communications for Australasian Performing Right Association (APRA).

== Biography ==
Debbie Kruger was born in Sydney, New South Wales, the first child of English-born Lou Kruger and Romanian-born Lisa Kruger née Berkowitz. She was brought up with younger sister Paula in the Jewish faith as members of the North Shore Synagogue. She attended primary school in a class group of seven children at Masada College, then secondary school with 200 students at Killara High School. She dropped out of her Communications degree course at Mitchell College of Advanced Education (now Charles Sturt University) in Bathurst in 1981. She completed tertiary studies with a Bachelor of Arts, followed by Master of Arts in Theatre Studies, at the University of New South Wales. Kruger developed an interest in theatre and decided to undertake a career in dramaturgy.

Kruger's first job was with the Australian Writers' Guild in 1985 as a membership officer, she became a freelance journalist in 1986, writing on pop-culture, including Music, Film & Television, Arts & Theatre, Travel, and Lifestyle. Kruger was a staff writer for the weekly entertainment newspaper, Variety, becoming the Sydney correspondent during December 1986 – February 1990, and then based in London from March 1990, but she left Variety at the end of the year. While writing for Variety her reviews used Krug as her moniker.

Moving back to Sydney in mid-1992, Kruger established a national public relations business, Kruger PRofiles, whose clients included the Brisbane Biennial International Music Festival and the Brisbane International Film Festival (BIFF). Kruger based herself in Byron Bay from 1993 and provided a weekly radio show on community radio station Bay FM 99.9 called Debbie Does Breakfast. She spent a year in Los Angeles in 1998–1999 before moving back to Byron Bay in mid-1999 as PR Manager for Sunspirit Aromatherapy.

Kruger returned to Sydney and became Manager of Communications and Public Affairs with the Australasian Performing Right Association (APRA) during 2000–2003. She orchestrated the publicity for APRA's 75th anniversary celebrations on 28 May 2001 including the showcasing of APRA's Ten best Australian songs at the APRA Awards, 20 songs from the Top 30 had been announced by Kruger four weeks earlier. While involved with this project, Kruger met and interviewed many of Australia's finest songwriters and decided to write a book; she left APRA in 2003, to concentrate on her writing. On 1 August 2005, Kruger published, Songwriters speak : conversations about creating music, which contains interviews with 45 Australian and New Zealand songwriters about their craft. As of March 2009, Kruger was living in Byron Bay, broadcasting Debbie Does Breakfast on Bay FM 99.9, and running Kruger PRofiles.

== Personal life ==
Kruger has a younger sister, Paula. Their father, Lou Kruger, was born in England, relocated to Australia, retired in 1990 and died on 17 March 2004. Their mother, Lisa née Berkowitz, was born in Romania in 1940, grew up in a United States foster home, relocated to Australia in 1958 where she met and married Lou in 1959. Lisa had a love of painting and travelling, and died in Australia on 9 November 2007.

== Bibliography ==
- Kruger, Debbie (1 August 2005). Songwriters speak : conversations about creating music. Balmain, N.S.W.: Limelight Press. ISBN 0-9757080-3-1.
