= To Her Door =

- 7" single cover

Single by Paul Kelly and the Coloured Girls

from the album Under the Sun
- B-side: "Bicentennial"
- Released: 28 September 1987
- Recorded: 1987
- Studio: Alberts Studios, Sydney
- Genre: Rock
- Length: 3:19
- Label: Mushroom
- Songwriter: Paul Kelly
- Producers: Alan Thorne, Paul Kelly

Paul Kelly and the Coloured Girls singles chronology
"Look So Fine, Feel So Low" (1987)	"To Her Door" (1987)	"Forty Miles to Saturday Night" (1988)

"To Her Door" is a song by Paul Kelly and the Coloured Girls, released as a single ahead of their second album, Under the Sun (released in North America and Europe as by Paul Kelly and the Messengers). The single was released in September 1987 and reached No. 14 on the Australian singles charts.

"To Her Door" won an ARIA Music Award in 1988 for Best Video, directed by Claudia Castle. In 2001, the Australasian Performing Right Association (APRA) listed "To Her Door" as one of the Top 30 Australian songs of all time, as one of two songs written by Kelly (alongside "Treaty").

In January 2018, as part of Triple M's "Ozzest 100", the 'most Australian' songs of all time, "To Her Door" was ranked number 26. In 2025, the song placed 22 in the Triple J Hottest 100 of Australian Songs.

== Music and lyrics ==
To Her Door
Paul Kelly & the Coloured Girls' highest charting single, "To Her Door", released in September 1987. Ahead of their December album, Under the Sun.

The song is a ballad with country-rock underpinnings, in which Kelly tells the story of a young couple who "married early". The man is identified as "Jack" in the unedited album version, but not in the edited single mix; the woman is never named. Due to Jack's drinking, the couple's marriage "hit(s) the skids" and they end up separating. After a year, Jack writes a letter to his ex-wife, and she decides to send him the fare so he can visit both her and their two children. In the final verse, Jack is on his way to meet them, and the song ends as he arrives in town on a Sunday, wondering, "Could he make a picture and get them all to fit?" The actual reunion between Jack and his family–if it even takes place–is never described. In his book How to Make Gravy, Kelly notes that "the entire story takes three and a half minutes and ends at the beginning."

It has been described as a brutal and beautiful attempt at reconciliation. The song contains references to 'The Buttery', a drug and rehabilitation clinic on the north coast of New South Wales, 'Silver Top', a Melbourne taxi company, and 'Olympic', a defunct coach company that operated inter-state and inter-capital services. In later performances of the song, Kelly replaced 'Olympic' with 'McCafferty's', which operated a Melbourne-Sydney coach service in later years.

In an interview with Debbie Kruger, Kelly indicated that the song took seven years to write.

I sing little melodies into a tape recorder and every now and then I go through the tapes and have a listen. And I heard that and I thought it would be good to put words to that, it’s a good tune.

Although there are no overt clues in the songs themselves, Kelly has stated that he may later have written about the same protagonist (saying, "I’ve got a feeling it’s the same guy") in "Love Never Runs on Time" from 1994's Wanted Man and then in 1996's "How to Make Gravy" from the extended play How to Make Gravy. (Although in "Gravy", the song's protagonist is identified as "Joe", not "Jack".) All three tracks appear (in live versions) on Kelly's live 8×CD boxed set, The A – Z Recordings (2010).

The B-side, "Bicentennial", describes the plight of Australian Aborigines in the past and the present, highlighting aboriginal deaths in custody. In 1988, Australia celebrated its bicentenary, in the song Kelly writes from the point of view of those unimpressed with 200 years of white settlement.

== Track listing ==
1. "To Her Door" – 3:19
2. "Bicentennial" – 3:03

== Personnel ==
Credits:

Paul Kelly and the Coloured Girls

- Paul Kelly – acoustic guitar, vocals
- Michael Barclay – drums, backing vocals
- Peter Bull – keyboards
- Steve Connolly – electric guitar, backing vocals
- John Schofield – bass guitar

Additional musicians

- Chris Coyne – tenor saxophone
- Chris Wilson – harmonica, vocals, baritone saxophone

Recording details

- Producer – Alan Thorne, Paul Kelly

== Charts ==
Chart (1987–88)	Peak position
Australia (Kent Music Report)	14

== Certifications ==
Region	Certification	Certified units/sales
Australia (ARIA)	8× Platinum	560,000^{‡}
New Zealand (RMNZ)	Platinum	30,000^{‡}
^{‡} Sales+streaming figures based on certification alone.
