= Tommy Emmanuel discography =

- Studio albums: 27
- Live albums: 6
- Compilation albums: 4
- Singles: 21

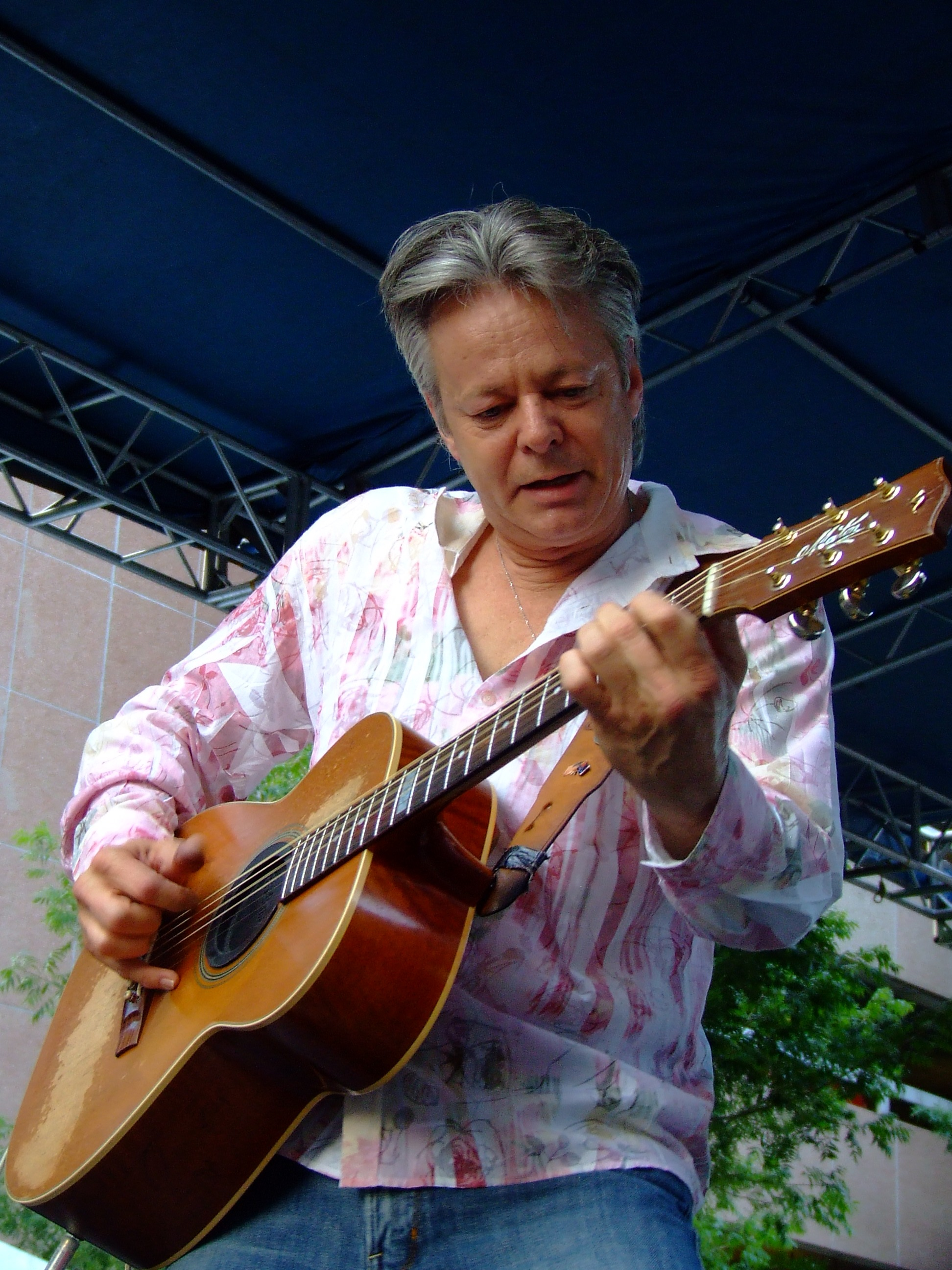

The discography of Australian guitarist, singer and songwriter Tommy Emmanuel consists of twenty-seven studio albums, six live albums, four compilation albums and twenty-one singles.

== Albums ==
=== Studio albums ===
List of studio albums, with selected chart positions and certifications
Title	Album details	Peak chart positions		Certifications
Title	Album details	AUS	NZ	Certifications
From Out of Nowhere	Released: 1979; Label: Trafalgar; Formats: Vinyl	—	—	
Untitled (with Philippe Gabbay)	Released: 1981; Label: ABC Music; Formats: Vinyl	—	—	
Up from Down Under	Released: 1987; Label: Artful Balance; Formats: Vinyl, CD, cassette	48	—	ARIA: Platinum
Dare to Be Different	Released: July 1990; Label: Mega; Formats: CD, cassette	13	39	ARIA: Gold
Determination	Released: October 1991; Label: Mega; Formats: CD, cassette	17	—	ARIA: Platinum
The Journey	Released: September 1993; Label: Columbia; Formats: CD, cassette	5	—	ARIA: 2× Platinum
Terra Firma (with Phil Emmanuel)	Released: March 1995; Label: Columbia; Formats: CD, cassette	12	—	
Classical Gas (with Australian Philharmonic Orchestra)	Released: November 1995; Label: Columbia; Formats: CD, cassette	6	—	ARIA: Gold
Can't Get Enough	Released: October 1996; Label: Columbia; Formats: CD, cassette	26	—	
The Day Finger Pickers Took Over the World (with Chet Atkins)	Released: March 1997; Label: Columbia; Formats: CD, cassette	—	—	
Collaboration	Released: October 1998; Label: Sony Music Australia; Formats: CD, cassette	51	—	
Only	Released: August 2000; Label: Favored Nations; Formats: CD, cassette	53	—	
Chet Lag (with Jim Nichols)	Released: 2000; Label: Adalt; Formats: CD	—	—	
Endless Road	Released: May 2004; Label: Favored Nations; Formats: CD, cassette	155	—	
The Mystery	Released: 19 June 2006; Label: Favored Nations; Formats: CD, cassette	—	—	
Happy Hour (with Jim Nichols)	Released: October 2006; Label: Original Works; Formats: CD, cassette	—	—	
Just Between Frets (with Frank Vignola)	Released: 3 November 2009; Label: Solid Air; Formats: CD	—	—	
Little by Little	Released: November 2010; Label: Sony Music Australia; Formats: CD, digital download	—	—	
All I Want for Christmas	Released: 28 October 2011; Label: Favored Nations; Formats: CD, DD	119	—	
The Colonel & the Governor (with Martin Taylor)	Released: February 2013; Label: Mesa/Bluemoon; Formats: CD, DD	—	—	
The Guitar Mastery of Tommy Emmanuel	Released: 2014; Label: Favored Nations; Formats: CD, DD	—	—	
Dov'è andata la musica (with Dodi Battaglia)	Released: 7 April 2015; Label: Più in Alto; Formats: CD, DD	—	—	
Just Passing Through (with Ian Cooper and Ian Date)	Released: 23 June 2015; Label: CGP Sounds; Formats: CD, DD	—	—	
It's Never Too Late	Released: 7 August 2015; Label: Sony Music Australia; Formats: CD, DD	31	—	
Christmas Memories	Released: 28 October 2016; Label: Sony Music Australia; Formats: CD, DD	—	—	
Pickin' (with David Grisman)	Released: 3 November 2017; Label: Acoustic Disc; Formats: DD	—	—	
Accomplice One	Released: 19 January 2018; Label: CGP Sounds / Sony Music Australia; Formats: CD, DD	—	—	
Heart Songs (with John Knowles)	Released: 11 January 2019; Label: CGP Sounds / Cooking Vinyl; Formats: CD, DD, streaming	—	—	
Accomplice Two	Released: 28 April 2023; Label: CGP Sounds / Sony Music Australia; Formats: CD, digital	—	—	
Living in the Light	Released: 10 October 2025; Label: Formats: CD, digital	—	—	
"—" denotes releases that did not chart or were not released in that country.

=== Live albums ===
List of live albums, with selected chart positions and certifications
Title	Album details	Peak chart positions
Title	Album details	AUS
Live One	Released: September 2005; Label: Original Works; Formats: CD	—
Center Stage	Released: April 2008; Label: Favored Nation / ABC Music; Formats: 2×CD + DVD	34 ^{°}
Live and Solo in Pensacola, Florida	Released: 20 September 2013; Label: CGP Sounds; Formats: CD, DD	—
Live at the Ryman	Released: 17 May 2017; Label: CGP Sounds / Sony Music Australia; Formats: CD, DD	—
Live! Christmas Time	Released: 4 December 2020; Label: CGP Sounds; Formats: DD	—
Live from the Balboa Theatre	Released: 12 February 2021; Label: CGP Sounds; Formats: DD	—
Live at the Sydney Opera House	Released: 21 March 2025; Label: Tommy Emmanuel (8721253213260); Formats:	—

Notes

- ° Australian Music DVD Chart.

=== Compilation albums ===
List of compilation albums, with selected chart positions and certifications
Title	Album details	Peak chart positions
Title	Album details	AUS
Initiation	Released: December 1992; Label: Columbia; Formats: CD, cassette	—
The Very Best of Tommy Emmanuel	Released: August 2001; Label: Columbia; Formats: CD, cassette	22
The Essential Tommy Emmanuel	Released: 15 October 2010; Label: Sony Music Australia; Formats: CD, DD	—
The Best of Tommysongs	Released: 8 May 2020; Label: GCP; Formats: DD, streaming	—
"—" denotes releases that did not chart or were not released in that country.

=== Box sets ===
List of box sets
Title	Album details
The Journey & Terra Firma	Released: 1996; Label: Columbia; Formats: 2×CD
Two Originals (The Journey & Classical Gas)	Released: 2003; Label: Columbia; Formats: 2×CD
The Great Tommy Emmanuel	Released: 2004; Label: Rajon Music Group; Formats: 3×CD

== Extended plays ==
List of EPs
Title	EP details
Accomplice Series, Vol. 1 (with Rob Ickes and Trey Hensley)	Released: 7 May 2021; Label: CGP; Formats: DD
Accomplice Series, Vol. 2 (with Richard Smith)	Released: September 2021; Label: CGP; Formats: DD
Accomplice Series, Vol. 3 (with Mike Dawes)	Released: 23 September 2022; Label: CGP; Formats: DD

== Singles ==
List of singles, with selected chart positions and certifications
Title	Year	Peak chart positions	Album
Title	Year	AUS	Album
"Up from Down Under"	1988	—	Up from Down Under
"Guitar Concierto de Aranjuez"	1989	138	Dare to Be Different
"Guitar Boogie"	1990	111	Dare to Be Different
"Heart Grows Fonder"	1990	—	Dare to Be Different
"Determination"	1991	151	Determination
"Stevie's Blues"	1991	93	Determination
"The Journey"	1993	29	The Journey
"Villa Anita"	1993	104	The Journey
"Initiation"	1993	—	The Journey
"Big Brother"	1994	—	The Journey
"Since We Met"	1994	125	The Journey (re-release)
"(Back on the) Terra Firma" (with Phil Emmanuel)	1995	44	Terra Firma
"Love Gone West" (with Phil Emmanuel)	1995	—	Terra Firma
"Classical Gas" (with Australian Philharmonic Orchestra)	1995	44	Classical Gas
"No More Goodbyes"	1997	134	Can't Get Enough
"After the Love Has Gone" (with CDB)	1998	74	Collaboration
"When a Child Is Born" (with Damien Leith)	2011	—	Non-album single
"One Christmas Night"	2012	—	All I Want for Christmas
"Bam!" (Glenn Proudfoot with Tommy Emmanuel)	2014	—	Non-album singles
"Here with Me" (Pam Rose with Tommy Emmanuel)	2017	—	Non-album singles
"Djangology"	2018	—	Accomplice One
"Imagine"	2020	—	Non-album single
"Somebody That I Used to Know" (with Mike Dawes)	2021	—	Accomplice Series, Vol 3
"Serenade to Summertime" (with Richard Smith)	2021	—	Accomplice Series, Vol 2
"Smells Like Teen Spirit" (with Mike Dawes)	2022	—	Accomplice Series, Vol 3
"Blown Away" (with Bachelor Girl featuring Ella Hooper)	2026	—	Waiting for the Day: Artist Sessions
"—" denotes releases that did not chart or were not released in that country.

=== Other singles ===
List of singles as featured artist, with selected chart positions
Title	Year	Peak chart positions
Title	Year	AUS
"The Garden" (as Australia Too)	1985	22
"Legends of the Southern Land" (Swanee, John St Peeters, Marty Rhone and Ray Burgess featuring Tommy Emmanuel)	2013	—
