= Henno Althoff =

German producer (born 1960)

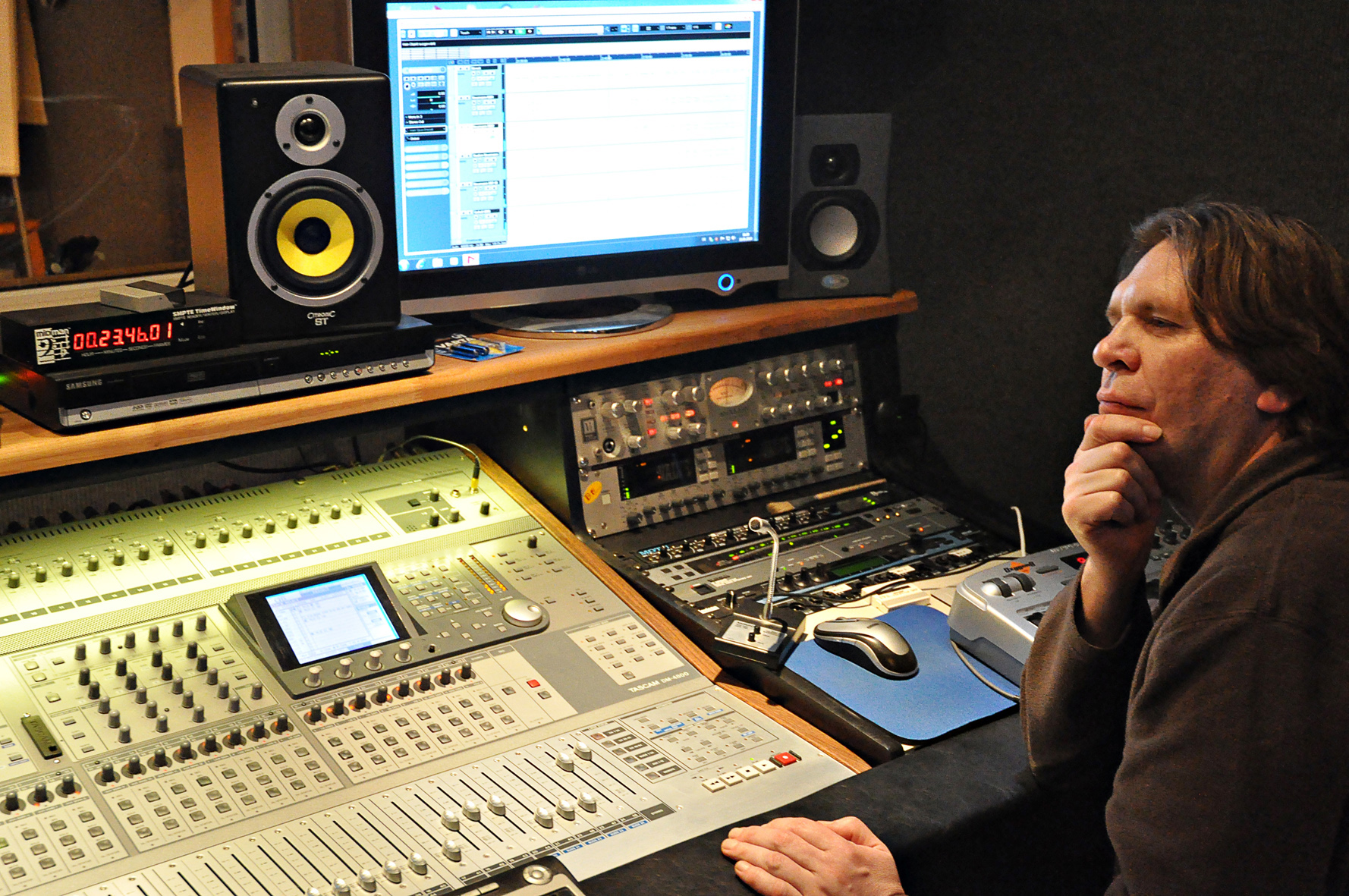
- Althoff at Adalt-Studio, January 2010

Background information
- Born: September 16, 1960 (age 65); Lippstadt, West Germany
- Occupations: record producer, recording engineer, studio owner
- Website: www.adalt-studio.de

Henno Althoff (born September 16, 1960) is a German record producer, recording engineer and studio owner, best known for his association with Australian fingerstyle guitarist Tommy Emmanuel.

== Biography ==
Althoff, a long-time Chet Atkins admirer, specializes in the recording of guitar music. It was at a Chet Atkins Appreciation Society convention in Nashville in the 1990s where he met Emmanuel for the first time. After Emmanuel had moved to Europe, Althoff played a key role in getting him started there, he aided in organizing concerts.

Later, Althoff produced Emmanuel's collaboration with guitarist Jim Nichols titled Chet Lag (re-issued as Happy Hour) and recorded several more of the Australian's work. Emmanuel dedicated his composition Sanitarium Shuffle to him, referring to Althoff's Lippstadt home as his sanitarium.

Apart from Emmanuel, he has worked with artists such as Jerry Donahue, Doug Morter, Ray Jackson, Clive Bunker, Rick Kemp, Joscho Stephan, Richard Smith and Gareth Pearson among others.

== Discography ==
- Tommy Emmanuel: Only (Original Works, 2000) (Assistant Engineer)
- Tommy Emmanuel, Jim Nichols: Chet Lag (Adalt Records), re-issued as Happy Hour (Original Works, 2006) (Producer, engineer)
- Tommy Emmanuel: Endless Road (Favored Nations, 2005) (Engineer)
- Fotheringay: 2 (Fledg'ling, 2008) (Engineer)
- Gathering: Legends of Folk Rock (Hypertension, 2009) (Studio)
- Gareth Pearson: Urban Echoes Vol. 1 (CandyRat Records, 2010) (Engineer)
- Joscho Stephan: Live in Concert DVD (Acoustic Music Records, 2007) (Audio mixing, mastering and encoding)

Discography is partially listed at Allmusic.
