= Little by Little =

Little by Little may refer to:

== Literature ==
- Eric, or, Little by Little, an 1858 children's novel by Frederic W. Farrar
- Little by Little, an autobiography by Jean Little
- Little by Little, a 2001 book by Michael Tyquin about the Royal Australian Army Medical Corps

== Music ==
- Little by Little (musical), a 1999 off-Broadway musical
- Little by Little (band), a 2000–2010 Japanese rock band

=== Albums ===
- Little by Little..., by Harvey Danger, 2005
- Little by Little (Tommy Emmanuel album), 2010
- Little by Little: Collectors Edition, an EP by Robert Plant, or the title song (see below), 1985
- Little by Little, by Lane 8, 2018

=== Songs ===
- "Little by Little" (James House song), 1994
- "Little by Little" (Oasis song), 2002
- "Little by Little" (Robert Plant song), 1985
- "Little by Little" (Rolling Stones song), 1964
- "Little by Little", by Alice Cooper from Hey Stoopid, 1991
- "Little by Little", by The Springfields,1963 (A different song than "Little by Little", by Dusty Springfield, 1966)
- "Little by Little", by Dusty Springfield, 1966
- "Little by Little", by Groove Armada from Goodbye Country (Hello Nightclub), 2001
- "Little by Little", by Junior Wells, 1960
- "Little by Little", by Laura and the Lovers, representing Lithuania in the Eurovision Song Contest 2005
- "Little by Little", by Nappy Brown, 1956
- "Little by Little", by Phillip Crosby, 1963
- "Little by Little", by Radiohead from The King of Limbs, 2011
- "Little by Little", by Supertramp from Slow Motion, 2002
- "Little by Little", by UB40 from Signing Off, 1980
- "Little by Little", composed by Robert E. Dolan
