= The Very Best of Tommy Emmanuel =

Greatest hits album by Tommy Emmanuel
- Released: 10 August 2001
- Genre: Jazz; rock
- Length: 2:01:21
- Label: Columbia/Sony

Tommy Emmanuel chronology
Only (2000)	The Very Best of Tommy Emmanuel (2001)	Endless Road (2004)

The Very Best of Tommy Emmanuel is a greatest hits double album by Australian guitarist, Tommy Emmanuel, which was released in August 2001. It peaked at number 22 on the ARIA Albums Chart and number 3 on the component, ARIA Australasian Artists Albums chart. One CD has Emmanuel using electric guitar, while on the other he used acoustic guitar.

== Track listing ==
CD1 (Electric)
No.	Title	Writer(s)	Length
1.	"Don't Hold Me Back"	Tommy Emmanuel, Rick Neigher	3:29
2.	"The Journey"	Emmanuel, David Hirschfelder	4:59
3.	"Fear of Rain"	Emmanuel, Peter Bowman	4:55
4.	"Who Dares Wins"	Emmanuel	5:52
5.	"Big Brother"	Emmanuel, Bowman	4:00
6.	"Stevie's Blues"	Emmanuel	4:23
7.	"Hearts Grow Fonder"	Emmanuel	4:10
8.	"Guitar Boogie"	Arthur "Guitar Boogie" Smith	3:30
9.	"When You Come Home"	Emmanuel	4:32
10.	"Determination"	Emmanuel	4:48
11.	"Don't Argue"	Emmanuel, Bowman	3:59
12.	"From the Hip"	Emmanuel	4:34
13.	"Tailin' the Invisible Man"	Emmanuel, James Roche	5:04
14.	"The Rise and Fall of Flingle Bunt"	Hank Marvin, Bruce Welch	3:48

CD2 (Acoustic)
No.	Title	Writer(s)	Length
1.	"Amanda's Room"	Emmanuel, Randy Goodrum	4:31
2.	"Classical Gas"	Mason Williams	5:05
3.	"Hellos and Goodbyes"	Emmanuel, Virgil Donati	4:36
4.	"Countrywide"	Emmanuel	2:54
5.	"Up from Down Under"	Emmanuel, Alan Mansfield	5:27
6.	"Villa de Martin"	Emmanuel, Goodrum	4:25
7.	"Fiesta"	Emmanuel	4:23
8.	"Midnight Drive"	Emmanuel, Goodrum	4:09
9.	"Since We Met"	Emmanuel	4:00
10.	"Mountain of Truth"	Emmanuel, Roger Mason	4:50
11.	"Initiation"	Emmanuel	4:19
12.	"Last Time I Saw You"	Emmanuel, Goodrum	4:25
13.	"Blue Moon"	Lorenz Hart, Richard Rodgers	2:37
14.	"Change for Good"	Emmanuel, Goodrum	3:57

== Charts ==
Chart (2001)	Peak position
Australian Albums (ARIA)	22
