= Dare to Be Different =

Dare to Be Different may refer to:

- Dare to Be Different (album), a 1990 album by Tommy Emmanuel
- Dare to Be Different (organisation), a nonprofit organisation
