= Center Stage =

Center Stage or Centre Stage may refer to:

== Films, TV, radio ==
- Center Stage (1991 film), a Hong Kong film by Stanley Kwan
- Center Stage (2000 film), a film by Nicholas Hytner
  - Center Stage: Turn It Up, a 2008 sequel to Center Stage
  - Center Stage: On Pointe, a 2016 sequel
- Center Stage (TV series), a 1954 American TV series
- Centerstage, a Philippine reality show on GMA Network

== Theater ==
- Center Stage (theater), a theater in Baltimore, Maryland
- Centre Stage (theater), a theater in Greenville, South Carolina
- Center Stage (Atlanta), a theater in Atlanta, Georgia
- Portland Center Stage, a theater company based in Portland, Oregon
- Richmond CenterStage, a performing arts center in Richmond, Virginia

== Music ==
- Center Stage (Tommy Emmanuel album), 2008
- Center Stage (Helen Reddy album), 1998
- Centre Stage (album), a 2013 album by Kimberley Walsh
- Center Stage, a 1990 album by Anthony Warlow
- "Center Stage", from Indigo Girls' 1989 album Indigo Girls

== Other ==
- Apple Center Stage, video conferencing camera feature

== See also ==
- Blocking (stage)
