= Phil Emmanuel =

Australian musician (1952–2018)

Background information
- Born: Phillip Ernest Emmanuel; 6 July 1952; Dorrigo, New South Wales, Australia
- Died: 24 May 2018 (aged 65) Parkes, New South Wales, Australia
- Occupation: Musician
- Instrument: Guitar

Phillip Ernest Emmanuel OAM (6 July 1952 – 24 May 2018) was an Australian guitar player. He was the older brother of musician Tommy Emmanuel.

== Career ==
Emmanuel found fame with The Trailblazers, and played with many other Australian artists including INXS, Jimmy Barnes, John Farnham, Ian Moss, composer Pete Hawkes [Reg Lindsay OAM] ]. He also played with many international artists such as British guitarist Hank B. Marvin and American performers Chet Atkins, Willie Nelson, Duane Eddy and Dolly Parton.

Emmanuel's 1992 debut album, Kakadu Sunrise, reached No. 33 on the New Zealand album charts. In 1994, he and his brother Tommy released the album Terra Firma, which was nominated for the 1995 ARIA Award for Best Adult Contemporary Album. In 2011, Emmanuel was inducted into the Australian Roll of Renown.

== Death and legacy ==
Emmanuel died suddenly of an asthma attack in Parkes, New South Wales, on 24 May 2018, aged 65. He was honoured with a posthumous induction into the Order of Australia in 2018 with a Medal of the Order of Australia (OAM), one of several Australian musicians to receive honours.

== Discography ==
=== Albums ===
List of studio and live albums, with selected chart positions
Title	Album details	Peak chart positions
Title	Album details	AUS
Kakadu Sunrise	Released: 1992; Label: Dino Music (DIN233D); Formats: LP, cassette	—
Terra Firma (with Tommy Emmanuel)	Released: February 1995; Label: Columbia (478413 2); Formats: CD, cassette	12
In The Shadows Of The Beatles Vol. 1	Released: 1999; Label: Aussie Music Group; Formats: CD	—
Electric Guitar Player	Released: 2003; Formats: CD	—
Live at Lizottes (with Pete Hawkes)	Released: August 2011; Label: Catapult; Formats: CD, digital	—
Chariots of Fire (with Rob Bostock)	Released: 2013; Label: Aussie Music Group; Formats: CD	—
Thunderbird Legacy (with Jacob Funnell)	Released: April 2019; Label: MGM (PEJF001); Formats: CD, digital	—

=== Compilation albums ===
List of compilation albums
Title	Details
The Best So Far	Formats: CD, digital

=== Extended plays ===
List of Extended plays
Title	Details
The Miracle & Other Christmas Songs	Released: 2001; Label: Phil Emmanuel; Formats: CD, digital

=== Singles ===
==== Charted singles ====
List of charted singles, with selected chart positions
Title	Year	Peak chart positions	Album
Title	Year	AUS	Album
"(Back on the) Terra Firma" (with Tommy Emmanuel)	1995	45	Terra Firma

==== Other singles ====
List of singles as featured artist, with selected chart positions
Title	Year	Peak chart positions
Title	Year	AUS
"The Garden" (as Australia Too)	1985	22

== Awards and honours ==
=== ARIA Awards ===
The Australian Recording Industry Association Music Awards, commonly known as ARIA Music Awards, are held to recognise excellence and innovation and achievement across all genres of Australian music. Award nominees and winners, excluding for sales and public voted categories, are selected by the ARIA Academy comprising "judges from all sectors of the music industry - retail, radio and tv, journalists and critics, television presenters, concert promoters, agents, ARIA member record companies and past ARIA winners". The inaugural ARIA Awards took place in 1987.

Year	Category	Nominated work	Result
1995	Best Adult Contemporary Album	Terra Firma	Nominated

=== Australian Roll of Renown ===
The Australian Roll of Renown honours Australian and New Zealander musicians who have shaped the music industry by making a significant and lasting contribution to country music. It was inaugurated in 1976 and the inductee is announced at the Country Music Awards of Australia in Tamworth in January.

Year	Nominee / work	Award	Result
2011	Phil Emmanuel	Australian Roll of Renown	inductee

=== Order of Australia ===
Year	Nominee / work	Award	Result
2018	Phil Emmanuel	Order of Australia	awarded
