= John Knowles (guitarist) =

American musician

John Knowles (born 1942) is an American acoustic guitarist.

== Career ==
Knowles first learned accordion, then ukulele, transposing the accordion keyboard to the ukulele fretboard. He studied guitar in high school, then attended Texas Christian University, where he received a degree in physics while playing guitar in his free time.

Knowles is a C.G.P. (Certified Guitar Player), a title Chet Atkins gave to fingerstyle guitarists he admired. The others are Tommy Emmanuel, Marcel Dadi, Jerry Reed, and Steve Wariner. Four of the CGP had their titles formalized by the CAAS (Chet Atkins Appreciation Society): Knowles, Emmanuel, Wariner, and Reed. After Atkins's death, his daughter gave a posthumous CGP to Paul Yandell, Atkins's guitar partner.

== Honors ==
- CGP member, Chet Atkins, 1996
- Induction, National Thumb Picker's Hall of Fame, 2004
- Grammy Award, two Emmy Award nominations

== Discography ==
=== As leader ===
- Sittin' Back Pickin (Sound Hole, 1979)
- Heart Songs with Tommy Emmanuel (CGP, 2019)

=== As sideman ===
- Chet Atkins, The First Nashville Guitar Quartet (RCA Victor, 1979)
- Tommy Emmanuel, Little by Little (Favored Nations, 2010)
- James Galway, The Wayward Wind (RCA, 1982)
