= APRA Music Awards of 1992 =

Annual Australian music awards

- Date: 1992
- Location: Australia
- Website: apra-amcos.com.au

The Australasian Performing Right Association Awards of 1992 (generally known as APRA Awards) are a series of awards held in 1992. The APRA Music Awards were presented by Australasian Performing Right Association (APRA) and the Australasian Mechanical Copyright Owners Society (AMCOS).

== Awards ==
Only winners are noted.

Award	Winner
Songwriter of the Year	Neil Finn, Tim Finn
Ted Albert Memorial Award	John Sturman
Song of the Year	"Heaven Knows" (Heather Field, Rick Price) by Rick Price
Country Song of the Year	"Way Out West" (Michael John Bois, John Lee, Broderick Smith, Christopher Michael Stockley, Kerryn Tolhurst) by James Blundell and James Reyne
Contemporary Classical Composition of the Year	"Refractions at Summer Cloud Bay" (Nigel Westlake) by Nigel Westlake
Children's Composition of the Year	"Christmas Day" (David Leslie Froggatt) by The Tin Lids
Jazz Composition of the Year	"Stevie's Blues" (Tommy Emmanuel) by Tommy Emmanuel
Most Performed Foreign Work	"(Everything I Do) I Do It for You" (Bryan Adams, Michael Kamen, Robert "Mutt" Lange) by Bryan Adams
Most Performed Australian Work	"Higher Than Hope" (Simon Hussey, Daryl Braithwaite) by Daryl Braithwaite
Most Performed Australian Work Overseas	"Disappear" (Michael Hutchence, Jon Farriss) by INXS
Television or Film Score of the Year	Brides of Christ (Mario Millo) by Mario Millo
Television or Film Theme of the Year	Brides of Christ (Mario Millo) by Mario Millo

== See also ==
- Music of Australia
