= The Journey (Tommy Emmanuel album) =

Studio album by Tommy Emmanuel
- Released: September 1993
- Recorded: April–June 1993
- Studio: Capitol Studios, Hollywood; Kiva-West; Treehouse, Los Angeles
- Genre: Rock; jazz
- Length: 53:22
- Label: Columbia, Epic
- Producer: Rick Neigher

Tommy Emmanuel chronology
Determination (1992)	The Journey (1993)	Initiation (1995)

Alternative cover
- The Journey Continues

The Journey is the sixth studio album by Australian guitarist Tommy Emmanuel. Released in September 1993, the album peaked at number 5 on the ARIA Charts; becoming Emmanuel's first top ten album. The album was certified double platinum in Australia in 1994.

The album was re-released in 1994 with additional tracks under the title The Journey Continues which peaked at number 18 on the ARIA charts itself.

At the ARIA Music Awards of 1994, the album won the ARIA Award for Best Adult Contemporary Album.

== Track listing ==
No.	Title	Writer(s)	Length
1.	"Tailin' the Invisible Man"	Emmanuel, James Roche	5:03
2.	"Big Brother"	Peter Bowman, Emmanuel	3:59
3.	"Somethin's Goin' On"	Emmanuel, Rick Neigher	4:07
4.	"Hellos & Goodbyes"	Virgil Donati, Emmanuel	4:35
5.	"The Journey"	Emmanuel, David Hirschfelder	4:58
6.	"If Your Heart Tells You To"	Emmanuel, Hirschfelder	3:55
7.	"Like Family"	Bowman, Emmanuel	4:25
8.	"Don't Hold Me Back"	Emmanuel, Neigher	3:29
9.	"Villa Anita"	Bowman, Emmanuel	5:42
10.	"White Picket Fences"	Emmanuel, Hirschfelder	4:46
11.	"The Big Swell"	Bowman, Emmanuel	4:06
12.	"Amy"	Emmanuel	1:58

NB: Track 12, "Amy" appears on the 1993 Australian CD release. It was replaced by "Initiation" (4:17) for the US and Canadian releases.

=== The Journey Continues ===
No.	Title	Writer(s)	Length
1.	"Don't Argue"		4:00
2.	"Since We Met"		4:02
3.	"The Hunt"		2:59
4.	"Michelle"	Lennon–McCartney	3:06
5.	"Day Tripper/Lady Madonna"	Lennon–McCartney	3:24
6.	"Fear of Rain"		4:55
7.	"Keep It Simple"		3:14
8.	"Sunset"		3:13
9.	"Southern Summers"		4:09

== Personnel ==
- Tommy Emmanuel – guitar, bass, percussion
- Stan Martin – trumpet, flugelhorn, horn arrangements
- Andy Martin – trombone
- Scott Martin – saxophone
- Kevin Savigar – musette
- Rick Neigher – keyboards
- Jerry Goodman – violin
- Chet Atkins – guitar
- Joe Walsh – guitar, slide guitar
- Abraham Laboriel – bass guitar
- Doane Perry – drums
- Carlos Vega – drums

== Charts ==
Chart (1993–94)	Peak position
Australian Albums (ARIA)	5

== Certifications ==
Region	Certification	Certified units/sales
Australia (ARIA)	2× Platinum	140,000^{^}
^{^} Shipments figures based on certification alone.
