= The Journey (Tommy Emmanuel song) =

Single by Tommy Emmanuel

from the album The Journey
- A-side: "The Journey"
- Released: 22 August 1993
- Recorded: April–June 1993
- Genre: Blues; soft rock; jazz
- Length: 4:10
- Label: Mega Records
- Songwriter(s): David Hirschfelder; Tommy Emmanuel
- Producer(s): Rick Neigher

Tommy Emmanuel singles chronology
"Stevie's Blues" (1991)	"The Journey" (1993)	"Villa Anita" (1993)

The Journey is a song written by David Hirschfelder and Tommy Emmanuel and recorded by Emmanuel for his studio album, The Journey. The song peaked at number 29 on the ARIA Charts in September 1993 becoming his highest charting single.

== Track listing ==
CD single (Columbia Records – 659567)

1. "The Journey" – 4:10
2. "Hellos & Goodbyes" – 4:37
3. "The Journey" (The Pine Creek Mix) – 4:52

== Charts ==
Chart (1993)	Peak position
Australia (ARIA)	29
