= Kristy Cox =

Australian country singer-songwriter

- Born: Adelaide, South Australia
- Genres: Country, bluegrass
- Occupation: Singer-songwriter
- Instrument: Vocals
- Years active: 2001−present
- Website: www.kristycox.com

Kristy Cox is an Australian country singer-songwriter. Cox relocated to the United States in 2013.

As of 2022, Cox has released eight studio albums and has won five golden guitars at the Country Music Awards of Australia. She was also named Australian Country Music Independent Artist of the Year off the back of her third album, Living for the Moment.

== Career ==
Kristy Cox began singing at 11. She worked the festival circuit and released the EP Twisted Heart in 2001 and My Affections in 2003.

In 2004, Cox graduated from the CMAA Australian College of Country Music, after being awarded a scholarship. In 2005, Cox made the 2005 Starmaker Grand Final and opened for Kasey Chambers, Beccy Cole, Jedd Hughes and Jake Nickolai.

Cox released her debut studio album From My Eyes in 2006 which contained nine original songs.

It was the subsequent four song EP Fallen, recorded in Nashville and produced by award winning Mark Thornton which saw the transition to bluegrass influences.

Cox released her second studio album Breaking New Ground in 2010. It was recorded at Country Q Studio in Nashville, with guests Bryan Sutton, Randy Kohrs and Alecia Nugent.

In February 2014, Cox released her fourth studio album Living for the Moment and first on Pisgah Ridge records. It featured Mike Bub, Stephen Mougin, Darren Nicholson, Steve Sutton, David Johnson and Jerry Salley.

In 2015 Cox was selected as an official showcase artist for the International Bluegrass Music Association (IBMA).

In April 2016, Cox released her fifth studio album, Part of Me. Good Morning Country reviewed the album saying "Kristy's second release for Pisgah Ridge Records is packed with emotional songs sung from the heart, and delivered by a true vocal powerhouse."

Cox's sixth studio album Ricochet was released in April 2018. The title track and album's first single peaked inside the Bluegrass Today's Top 10 Songs. The album debuted at number 1 on the Billboard Bluegrass album chart.

In February 2020, Cox released her seventh studio album No Headlights. The album debuted at number 2 on the Billboard Bluegrass album chart.

In August 2021, Cox released "Person of the Year", the lead single from her eighth studio album. About the song, Cox said "'Person of the Year' is such a special song that pays tribute to nurses and doctors who work tirelessly to save others. The last 18 months have been especially hard on them." Shades of Blue was released in February 2022.

== Discography ==
=== Studio albums ===
List of studio albums
Title	Album details
From My Eyes	Released: 2006; Label: Kristy Cox; Format: CD
Breaking New Ground	Released: 2010; Label: Kristy Cox (KC003); Format: CD, Digital download
Miles & Timezones	Released: January 2012; Label: Kristy Cox (KC004); Format: CD, Digital download
Living for the Moment	Released: February 2014; Label: Pisgah Ridge (PR15172); Format: CD, Digital download
Part of Me	Released: April 2016; Label: Pisgah Ridge (PR16492); Format: CD, Digital download
Ricochet	Released: January 2018; Label: Country Rocks (CR1002) / Mountain Fever Records; Format: CD, Digital download
No Headlights	Released: February 2020; Label: Mountain Fever Records (MFR200100); Format: CD, Digital download
Shades of Blue	Released: February 2022; Label: Billy Blue Records (BBR-8548); Format: CD, Digital download
Let It Burn	Released: 31 May 2024; Label: Billy Blue Records; Format: CD, Digital download

== Awards and nominations ==
=== Country Music Awards of Australia ===
The Country Music Awards of Australia is an annual awards night held in January during the Tamworth Country Music Festival. Celebrating recording excellence in the Australian country music industry. They commenced in 1973.

Year	Nominee / work	Award	Result	Ref.
2015	"One Heartbreak Away"	Bluegrass Recording of the Year	Won	
2017	"Another Weary Mile"	Bluegrass Recording of the Year	Won	
2017	Kristy Cox	Female Artist of the Year	Nominated	
2017	Part Of Me	Alternative Country Album of the Year	Nominated	
2019	Kristy Cox	Female Artist of the Year	Nominated	
2019	"Ricochet"	Bluegrass Recording of the Year	Won	
2020	"Yesterday’s Heartache"	Bluegrass Recording of the Year	Won	
2021	"Finger Picking Good" (featuring Tommy Emmanuel)	Bluegrass Recording of the Year	Won	
2021	No Headlights	Traditional Album of the Year	Nominated	
2021	Kirsty Cox	Female Artist of the Year	Nominated	
2022	(unknown)	(unknown)	Nominated	
2022	(unknown)	(unknown)	Nominated	
2023	"Good Morning Moon"	Bluegrass Recording of the Year	Won	
2023	Shades of Blue	Traditional Country Album of the Year	Nominated	
2025	Let it Burn	Album of the Year	Nominated	
2025	Let it Burn	Traditional Country Album of the Year	Nominated	
2025	Let it Burn	Bluegrass Recording of the Year Artist	Won	
2027	"Hurricane"	Bluegrass Recording of the Year	Pending	
