= Forever So =

Studio album by Husky
- Released: 21 October 2011
- Genre: Indie folk
- Length: 47:37
- Label: Liberation Music, Sub Pop
- Producer: Gideon Preiss, Husky Gawenda

Husky chronology
Quiet Little Rage (2008)	Forever So (2011)	Ruckers Hill (2014)

Singles from Please Leave Your Light On
- 1. "Dark Sea" Released: 10 August 2011; 2. "History's Door" Released: 15 August 2011; 3. "The Woods" Released: 13 March 2012

Forever So is the official debut studio album by Australian indie folk band Husky, released in 2012 on Sub Pop Records and mixed by Noah Georgeson. It includes the song "History's Door" that won the triple j Unearthed contest.

At the ARIA Music Awards of 2012, the album was nominated for Best Adult Contemporary Album.

== Track listing ==
All tracks are written by Husky Gawenda

No.	Title	Length
1.	"Tidal Wave"	4:16
2.	"Fake Moustache"	3:28
3.	"History's Door"	3:52
4.	"The Woods"	3:17
5.	"Hunter"	4:01
6.	"Dark Sea"	2:58
7.	"Forever So"	2:02
8.	"Animals & Freaks"	5:19
9.	"Instrumental"	1:01
10.	"Hundred Dollar Suit"	3:16
11.	"How Do You Feel"	3:29
12.	"Don't Tell Your Mother"	5:14
13.	"Farewell (In 3 Parts)"	5:24

== Charts ==
Chart (2011)	Peak position
Australian Albums (ARIA)	33

== Release history ==
Country	Date	Format	Label	Catalogue
Australia	21 October 2011	Compact disc; digital download	Liberation Music	LMCD0152
United States	2012	Compact disc; digital download; Vinyl LP	Sub Pop	SP999
