= Into the Land of Promise =

Studio album by Karma County
- Released: September 1999
- Recorded: December 1998–May 1999
- Studio: Megaphon Studios and Karma County Studios
- Label: Warner Music Australasia
- Producer: Brendan Gallagher

Karma County chronology
Olana (1998)	Into the Land of Promise (1999)	This Tin Stardom (2000)

Into the Land of Promise is the third studio album by Australian country, pop music trio, Karma County. The album was released in September 1999 and peaked at number 96 on the ARIA Charts.

At the ARIA Music Awards of 2000, the album won the ARIA Award for Best Adult Contemporary Album.

== Track listing ==
1. "Secret Country" - 4:17
2. "Everlovin' Laughter - 3:05
3. "The Men Who Ran Away from the Circus" - 3:27
4. "The Man That Midas Touched" - 3:15
5. "On the Sacred Sand" - 2:52
6. "Soliloquy" - 3:52
7. "Watch Over Me" - 2:19
8. "Lasoo" - 3:02
9. "How Long" - 3:31
10. "No Veil, No Heart" - 3:35
11. "Mercy Sleep" - 3:32
12. "Please God and the Weather" - 3:32

== Charts ==
Chart (1999)	Peak position
Australian Albums (ARIA)	96
