= The Mystery (album) =

Studio album by Tommy Emmanuel
- Released: 19 June 2006
- Studio: Azalea Studio, Nashville, Tennessee; Rainbow Recording, Yorktown, VA; Winstaria Studio, Yorktown, VA
- Genre: Jazz
- Length: 39:01
- Label: Favored Nations
- Producer: Kim Person

Tommy Emmanuel chronology
Happy Hour (2006)	The Mystery (2006)	Center Stage (2008)

The Mystery is an album by Australian guitarist Tommy Emmanuel that was released in 2006. The album includes the track "Gameshow Rag/Cannonball Rag" which was nominated for Best Country Instrumental Performance at the 49th Annual Grammy Awards. The song won Instrumental of the Year at the 2007 Country Music Awards of Australia.

== Reception ==
Professional ratings
Review scores
Source	Rating
AllMusic	3.5/5 stars

Ken Dryden from AllMusic said "This is a pleasant, well-engineered CD, with obvious comparisons in spots to the late Nashville guitar master Chet Atkins."

Fred Kraus from Minor 7th wrote: "Speed, melody, tone, songwriting skill, versatility -- Emmanuel effortlessly displays it all on his 17th collection, The Mystery", adding that "Emmanuel proves skillful without being flashy; calm without being soporific; thoughtful without being pedantic. He remains faithful to the melody, using his exceptional guitar work to support the essence of the song. Very nice stuff."

== Track listing ==
All tracks are written by Tommy Emmanuel except where noted.

No.	Title	Length
1.	"Cantina Senese"	1:53
2.	"Gameshow Rag/Cannonball Rag" (Emmanuel, Merle Travis)	2:26
3.	"The Mystery"	3:57
4.	"Cowboy's Dream"	3:27
5.	"Walls" (Mary Ann Kennedy, Pamela Rose, Randy Sharp)	3:40
6.	"Lewis & Clark"	4:05
7.	"The Diggers' Waltz"	3:31
8.	"Antonella's Birthday"	2:46
9.	"And So It Goes" (Billy Joel)	3:21
10.	"That's the Spirit"	2:13
11.	"Footprints"	4:03
12.	"Keep It Simple"	3:39

== Personnel ==
- Tommy Emmanuel – guitar, vocals
- Elizabeth Watkins – vocals
- Pamela Rose – harmony vocals
