= Up from Down Under =

Studio album by Tommy Emmanuel
- Released: 1987
- Studio: Wireless Set, Wam Studio
- Genre: Country; folk; jazz
- Length: 37:05
- Label: Artful Balance
- Producer: Rod Tamlyn, Tommy Emmanuel

Tommy Emmanuel chronology
From Out of Nowhere (1979)	Up from Down Under (1987)	Dare to Be Different (1990)

Up from Down Under is an album by Australian guitarist Tommy Emmanuel. The album was released in 1987 and peaked at number 48 on the ARIA Charts, becoming his first charting album. The album was certified platinum in Australia in 1992.

At the ARIA Music Awards of 1989, the album was nominated for Best Cover Art but lost to Temple of Low Men by Crowded House.

== Track listing ==
All tracks are written by Tommy Emmanuel except where noted.

Side A
No.	Title	Length
1.	"Up from Down Under" (Tommy Emmanuel, Alan Mansfield)	5:26
2.	"Raindance"	4:30
3.	"Daybreak"	3:07
4.	"Lady Madonna" (Lennon–McCartney)	3:02
5.	"Soul Search"	2:19

Side B
No.	Title	Length
1.	"Michelle" (Lennon-McCartney)	3:11
2.	"Initiation"	4:30
3.	"Turning Point"	2:43
4.	"Times Change"	3:24
5.	"Night Sky"	5:13

== Personnel ==
- Tommy Emmanuel – acoustic guitar and percussions
- Graham Jessey – soprano saxophone
- Sam McNally – piano and organ

== Charts ==
Chart (1988)	Peak position
Australian Albums (ARIA)	48

== Certifications ==
Region	Certification	Certified units/sales
Australia (ARIA)	Platinum	70,000^{^}
^{^} Shipments figures based on certification alone.
