= Almost Alone =

Studio album by Chet Atkins
- Released: May 1996
- Recorded: Nashville, TN
- Genre: Country, pop
- Label: Columbia
- Producer: Chet Atkins

Chet Atkins chronology
Simpatico (1994)	Almost Alone (1996)	The Day Finger Pickers Took Over the World (1997)

Professional ratings
Review scores
Source	Rating
Allmusic	3/5 stars

Almost Alone is the fifty-seventh studio album by Chet Atkins. He was 71 at the time of the album's release. It is almost all solo guitar instrumentals. "Jam Man" won the 1997 Grammy award for Best Country & Western Instrumental Performance.

Atkins replaced the E and A normal guitar bass strings on a Gibson Country Gentleman guitar with thicker strings on "I Still Write Your Name in the Snow" to lower them an octave, giving a fuller bass accompaniment effect. There are no overdubs except for "Jam Man" and "You Do Something to Me". "Jam Man" uses a musical effect of the same name.

As part of the promotion for the release, Atkins signed 125 Gibson Epiphone guitars that were given away in contests around the country.

== Track listing ==
All songs by Chet Atkins unless noted.

1. "Big Foot" – 1:42
2. "Waiting for Susie B." – 3:16
3. "A Little Mark Musik" – 3:10
4. "Jam Man" – 3:23
5. "I Still Write Your Name in the Snow" (Atkins, Billy Edd Wheeler) – 3:00
6. "Pu, Uana Hulu (Remembering Gabby)" (David Alapai) – 3:00
7. "Happy Again" – 2:52
8. "Sweet Alla Lee" – 2:53
9. "Maybelle" – 3:11
10. "Mr. Bojangles" (Jerry Jeff Walker) – 3:06
11. "Cheek to Cheek" (Irving Berlin) – 3:16
12. "You Do Something to Me" (Cole Porter) – 2:55
13. "Ave Maria" (Franz Schubert) – 3:23

== Personnel ==
- Chet Atkins - guitar, vocals
- Randy Goodrum - keyboards on "I Still Write Your Name in the Snow"
- Randy Howard - fiddle on "Sweet Alla Lee"
- Paul Yandell - guitar on "Maybelle"
- Bergen White - string arrangements
- Nashville String Machine - strings

== Production notes ==
- Engineered by Clark Hagen, Jim McKell, Chet Atkins
- Mastered by Jonathan Russell
- Mixed by Eric Rudd

== Chart performance ==
Chart (1996)	Peak position
U.S. Billboard Top Country Albums	74
