= Szymon (musician) =

Australian musician (1989–2012)

- Born: Szymon Josiah Borzestowski; 18 February 1989; Newcastle, Australia
- Died: 2 December 2012 (aged 23)
- Occupation: Musician

Szymon Josiah Borzestowski (18 February 1989 – 2 December 2012), known by his stage name Szymon, was an Australian musician. His debut album, Tigersapp, was released three years after his death and was nominated for a 2015 ARIA Award for Best Adult Contemporary Album and debuted at #21 on the ARIA Albums Chart.

Szymon began working on his album in 2007, when he was eighteen years old. Production was put on hold in early 2010 due to mental health issues. Shortly after Szymon had committed suicide, in 2012, Mark Holland, a producer from EMI, continued mixing the songs, and the final result was released in August 2015, titled Tigersapp.

Szymon's younger brother Dom, who is known by others as Donnie, is the drummer of the Australian indie rock group Gang of Youths.

== Discography ==
- Tigersapp (21 August 2015)

No.	Title	Length
1.	"Golden"	3:50
2.	"Locks"	3:39
3.	"Medusa"	3:16
4.	"Roma"	4:14
5.	"Katyusha"	3:58
6.	"Runaway"	3:52
7.	"Saigon"	3:23
8.	"Brokenworld"	4:15
9.	"Zoo Story"	3:49
10.	"Trojan Stalks"	2:22
11.	"Floods"	2:53
12.	"Polen"	2:09
Total length:		41:40

- Blue Coloured Mountain (8 November 2019)

No.	Title	Length
1.	"Yakuza"	2:54
2.	"Feenicks"	2:28
3.	"Blue Coloured Mountain"	2:15
4.	"Orestes"	2:52
5.	"Anhalt"	4:00
6.	"Untitled"	2:34
7.	"Come Back Home"	1:19
Total length:		18:22
