= Live One (Tommy Emmanuel album) =

Live album by Tommy Emmanuel
- Released: September 2005
- Venue: Crown Melbourne, Australia
- Genre: Jazz, contemporary jazz
- Length: 103:27
- Label: Original Works
- Producer: Rod Tamlyn

Tommy Emmanuel chronology
Endless Road (2004)	Live One (2005)	Happy Hour (2006)

Live One is a live album recorded at the Crown Casino in Melbourne by Australian guitarist Tommy Emmanuel. It was released in September 2005.

== Reception ==
Amazon editor said "Australian guitarist Tommy Emmanuel will go down in history as one of the world's greatest guitarists - ever! Live One is a document of an extraordinary and unique talent - a rare instrumental album that transcends genre or age. It is pure entertainment, pure music." adding "Live One is 100 minutes exploring a wide and seeming endless repertoire - tender ballads, classic country picking, humorous anecdotes, old favorites, right through to blistering runs and mind boggling technique."

== Track listing ==
All tracks are written by Tommy Emmanuel except where noted

CD1
No.	Title	Length
1.	"Beatles Medley" (John Lennon, Paul McCartney)	5:28
2.	"Peter Allen Medley/Waltzing Matilda" (Peter Allen, Traditional)	4:55
3.	"Classical Gas" (Mason Williams)	3:31
4.	"Old Fashioned Love Song" (Paul Williams)	2:57
5.	"Son of a Gun"	1:56
6.	"Dixie MacGuire"	3:16
7.	"Country Wide"	1:56
8.	"Saltwater" (Julian Lennon, Mark Spiro, Leslie Spiro)	2:42
9.	"Borsalino" (Claude Bolling)	1:50
10.	"Up from Down Under"	3:02
11.	"Morning Aire"	4:38
12.	"Those Who Wait"	4:21
13.	"Michelle" (Lennon, McCartney)	4:07
14.	"Questions"	3:37
15.	"Angelina"	3:37
16.	"Precious Time/That's the Spirit"	3:15
17.	"Mona Lisa" (Ray Evans, Jay Livingston)	4:26
18.	"Mombasa"	2:48

CD2
No.	Title	Length
1.	"Amazing Grace" (John Newton)	3:33
2.	"The House of the Rising Sun" (Traditional)	4:55
3.	"Guitar Rag" (Merle Travis)	3:19
4.	"Blue Moon" (Richard Rodgers, Lorenz Hart)	2:43
5.	"Mozzarella Tarantella"	3:01
6.	"Guitar Boogie"	3:59
7.	"Train to Dusseldorf"	2:39
8.	"One Mint Julep" (Rudy Toombs)	3:32
9.	"The Hunt"	3:21
10.	"Initiation"	8:04
