= Karma County =

Australian musical group

- Origin: Sydney, New South Wales, Australia
- Genres: Country; pop
- Years active: 1995–present
- Labels: TWA; WEA/Warner; Littoral; Vitamin
- Members: Stuart Eadie; Michael Galeazzi; Brendan Gallagher
- Website: karmacounty.com.au

Karma County are an Australian country and pop music trio who formed in 1995. They comprise Stuart Eadie on drums, percussion and backing vocals; Michael Galeazzi on bass guitar, double bass and backing vocals; and Brendan Gallagher on lead guitar, lead vocals, keyboards, bouzouki, percussion, drums and bass guitar. They have released five studio albums, Last Stop Heavenly Heights (1996), Olana (March 1998), Into the Land of Promise (September 1999), Happy Birthday Dear Customer (November 2001) and Pacifico (August 2004). At the ARIA Music Awards of 2000, Into the Land of Promise won the ARIA Award for Best Adult Contemporary Album.

== History ==
=== 1995–1998: Last Stop Heavenly Heights and Olana ===
Karma County were formed in 1995 in Sydney as a country, pop music project by Brendan Gallagher on lead guitar and lead vocals (ex-the Leisuremasters). Gallagher, as Karma County, released a single, "She Never Loved You", which was co-written by him with the Leisuremasters bass guitarist, Brett Jackson. That group had also included Damon Davies on guitar and vocals; and Liz Smith on drums. They performed, "a mix of American-influenced roots music (New Orleans R&B, Tex Mex, Cajun, jazz) and British-styled pop." The Leisuremasters released two extended plays, Unhappy Hour (December 1992) and Water Moves (May 1994), before disbanding.

By October 1995 Gallagher was joined in Karma County by Stuart Eadie on drums, percussion and backing vocals (ex-the Clouds, Died Pretty, the Whitlams) and Michael Galeazzi on double bass, bass guitar and backing vocals (ex-Brookes). Australian musicologist, Ian McFarlane, described their sound, "a diverse musical palette, taking in country-tinged Oz rock, pop, blues and jazz with strong, varied songs, crooning vocals, lap steel, and unusual instrumentation (such as bouzouki, violin and cello)."

The group's debut album, Last Stop Heavenly Heights was released in 1996 with the associated single, "Postcard". The album was co-produced by Gallagher with Sean Kennedy, Keith Walker, Jeremy Allom and Phil McKellar. Iain Clacher of Green Left Weekly observed, "a striking debut CD for Sydney band Karma County, a strange bar-band which seems to inhabit its very own original space in Australian music... [their] appeal revolves around its ability masterfully to grip hold of disparate styles... [with] a kind of soft-edged mellow tinge to [the album], which helps blend together all the sources and inspirations into a seamless and gratifying whole."

Olana, their second album, was released in March 1998 with co-production by Allom, Gallagher and Kennedy, as well as Don Bartley, Adrian Grigorieff and Dave Rashleigh. It was followed in the next month by the related single, "Told You So". McFarlane felt, "[both] were stronger efforts." They supported gigs by international act, Michelle Shocked, in April on an Australia tour. At the ARIA Music Awards of 1998 Olana was nominated for the ARIA Award for Best Independent Release. The album provided two more singles, "Good Things Come to Me Now" and "This Is not the Real World". Bruce Reid had joined as an auxiliary member on lap steel guitar, in July, for performances and recording sessions.

=== 1999–2000: Into the Land of Promise ===
In early 1999 the band signed a deal with Melody Management and Universal Music Group. In September of that year their third album, Into the Land of Promise, was released via Warner Music Australasia. It was produced and recorded by Gallagher with Tim Whitten. McFarlane noticed it was, "a subtle blend of roots music, soulful ballads and country-flavoured pop, the album was the band's strongest release to date." It yielded two singles "Secret Country", featuring Jimmy Little and "The Men Who Ran Away from the Circus". Both gained airplay on national youth radio, Triple J. At the ARIA Music Awards of 2000, Into the Land of Promise, won the ARIA Award for Best Adult Contemporary Album. Gallagher had also produced the 1999 winner, Jimmy Little's album, Jimmy Little, which had been recorded with Karma County as the studio band.

In mid-2000 Karma County toured Australia from Cairns to Albany before undertaking a seven-week tour of continental Europe, United Kingdom and North America, from July. Performances included appearances at WOMAD festivals in Hanover, Reading and Seattle; opening the Australian Film Festival in Rome and guesting, with Jimmy Little, at Shakespeare's Globe Theatre in London.

=== 2001–2000: Happy Birthday Dear Customer and Pacifico ===
In 2001 the band completed a four state tour promoting, "Where Could I Go but Home", the lead single ahead of their fourth album, Happy Birthday Dear Customer which was released in November 2001. It was produced by Whitten and released via Shock Records. The album's title refers to a birthday cake for Eadie at a Japanese food restaurant in Toronto – where the staff did not know his name. After a tour with auxiliary members, Lindsay Page on piano and Cameron Bruce on keyboards, they formed the backing band for a Carole King Tribute show, Tapestry, using vocals by Jenny Morris, Vika & Linda Bull, and Jodi Phillis. With Galeazzi as musical director, the show played theatres in state capital cities, during September 2001. Karma County then toured with auxiliary members Reid and Bruce, adding Lachlan Doley on keyboards, into early 2002. Subsequently they resumed working as a trio.

In August 2004 Karma County released their fifth studio album, Pacifico, including the track, "Dexter & Sinistra" – a song and related music video – recorded with Australian actor, Bryan Brown, providing spoken vocals. Brown summarised Gallagher's instructions, "You want me to say this just like I'm tellin' a story, right?" According to The Age's Michael Dwyer, "Combined with Karma County's coastal spaghetti-western atmosphere and one of Gallagher's cooler guitar riffs, the track became a highlight of the Sydney trio's new album. Australia's beloved Gardening Australia presenter Costa Georgiadis makes a brief cameo appearance at the end of the video. " The album re-united the band with recording engineer, Whitten and mixer, Allom, on the independent label, Littoral Records. They toured Australian capital cities and some regional centres.

After 2004 they played occasional festival and corporate shows while recording little new material and mostly re-visiting their back catalogue.

In October 2008 they issued a 36-track double compilation album, Headland, through Vitamin Records. It has two new tracks, and uses tracks re-mixed and re-mastered from each of their five studio albums, live tracks and some rarities. They undertook a brief east coast Australian tour. Karma County play occasional gigs – the latest, as from August 2019, was in March 2017 at Port Fairy. The original members pursue solo ventures – Galeazzi with the Java Quartet and music education; Eadie with a graphics business and drum duties with various bands in Byron Bay, including occasional Uke Nights; and Gallagher with his solo career and music production.

== Members ==
- Stuart Eadie – drums, percussion, backing vocals, programming
- Michael Galeazzi – electric bass guitar, double bass, backing vocals
- Brendan Gallagher – lead vocals, guitars (electric, acoustic), keyboards, bouzouki, percussion, drums

Auxiliary members

- Bruce Reid – lap steel guitar, guitar
- Lindsay Page – piano
- Cameron Bruce – keyboards
- Lachlan Doley – keyboards

== Discography ==
=== Albums ===
List of studio albums and Australian chart positions
| Title | Album details | Peak chart positions |
| Title | Album details | AUS |
|---|---|---|
| Last Stop Heavenly Heights | Released: 1996; Label: Laughing Boy; Formats: CD | — |
| Olana | Released: March 1998; Label: TWA (TWAD447); Formats: CD | — |
| Into the Land of Promise | Released: September 1999; Label: Warner Music Australasia (3984295112); Formats: CD | 96 |
| Happy Birthday Dear Customer | Released: November 2001; Label: Karma County Studios (KCP008); Formats: CD | — |
| Pacifico | Released: August 2004; Label: Vitamin (LIT001); Formats: CD | — |

=== Compilations ===
List of Compilations albums
| Title | Album details |
|---|---|
| This Tin Stardom | Released: 2000; Label: Karma Country (TND 204); Formats: CD |
| Headland | Released: October 2008; Label: Vitamin Records (kc009); Formats: 2xCD, Digital download |

== Awards and nominations ==
=== ARIA Music Awards ===
The ARIA Music Awards is an annual awards ceremony that recognises excellence, innovation, and achievement across all genres of Australian music. The Killjoys won 1 award from 2 nominations.

| Year | Nominee / work | Award | Result | Ref. |
|---|---|---|---|---|
| 1998 | Olana | Independent Release | Nominated | |
| 2000 | Into the Land of Promise | Best Adult Contemporary Album | Won | |
