= Husky (band) =

Australian indie folk band

- Origin: Melbourne, Victoria, Australia
- Genres: Indie rock; indie folk
- Years active: 2007–present
- Labels: Liberation Music; Sub Pop
- Members: Husky Gawenda; Gideon Preiss; Holly Thomas; Jules Pascoe
- Website: www.huskysongs.com

Husky are an indie folk band from Melbourne, Australia. They have opened for Neil Young, Devendra Banhart, Gotye, The Shins.

== History ==
=== 2007-2013: Quiet Little Rage & Forever So ===
In 2007, the band recorded and mixed an album at Sing Sing Recording Studios in Melbourne, with all songs written and produced by Husky Gawenda. The album was released in 2008 under the title Quiet Little Rage. In 2011 and prior to release of Forever So Gawenda said "Unfortunately that record didn't get a proper release. We didn't have a label, didn't have any money, didn't know what we were doing. We did everything ourselves, even publicity. It never really got heard [so] to call that our first album would be inaccurate; it's more like a demo, even though we put a lot of work into it."

In March 2011, Husky uploaded "History's Door" onto Triple J Unearthed, which gained attention. Gideon Preiss said "Things started to escalate after Unearthed; we had been doing everything ourselves for a while, but we couldn't be across everything any more; there was too much happening. That's a great problem to have" and the band signed manager, Bonnie Dalton, who looks after record label Liberation.

The band's official debut singles were "Dark Sea" and "History's Door" in August 2011. In October 2011 Husky released Forever So, which was recorded in Gawenda's backyard. The album debuted at number 33 on the ARIA Charts.

Beat Magazine said "Husky's official debut album Forever So is intimate, affecting and richly textured. Drummer Luke Collins and bassist Evan Tweedie provide deft touches to these carefully-crafted songs, while Californian producer Noah Georgeson captures Husky's aesthetic superbly by working closely with Gawenda and Preiss in the mixing of the album."

At the J Awards of 2011, Husky were nominated for Unearthed Artist of the Year at the J Awards of 2011.

In February 2012 Husky became the first Australian band to be signed to Sub Pop records, who released Forever So internationally. Husky Gawenda appeared on RocKwiz on 14 July 2012.

At the ARIA Music Awards of 2012, Forever So was nominated for an ARIA Award.

On 25 March 2013, Husky Gawenda won the bi-annual Professional Development Award at the APRA Awards (Australia).

=== 2014-2019: Ruckers Hill & Punchbuzz ===
In 2014, Husky commenced promotion for their second album Ruckers Hill. It was released in October 2014 and peaked at number 29 on the ARIA Charts. The album spawned three singles and in December 2014 Husky Gawenda won first prize for the Vanda and Young International Song Writing Competition for song "Saint Joan".

Late 2016, Husky announced the release of an upcoming third record for 2017. The first single "Late Night Store" was released in November 2016 and a video was premiered at the same period on HighClouds. In June 2017 the band released their third album Punchbuzz. The album peaked at number 32 on the ARIA Charts. The album saw them branch out from their folky-acoustic roots to a more synthy sound, inspired by a year of living in Berlin.

This was followed in October with the EP Bedroom Recordings..

=== 2020: Stardust Blues ===
In August 2020, Husky released their fourth studio album Stardust Blues. The album was written partly in the Westbury Hotel, an old building in the Melbourne suburb of Balaclava. A sharehouse at the time, members of the band had lived there for years before it was demolished in late 2019.

== Discography ==
=== Studio albums ===
Title	Details	Peak chart positions
Title	Details	AUS
Forever So	Released: 21 October 2011; Label: Liberation Music (LMCD0152); Formats: CD, digital download	33
Ruckers Hill	Released: 17 October 2014; Label: Liberation Music (LMCD0248); Formats: CD, digital download	29
Punchbuzz	Released:2 June 2017; Label: Embassy of Music, Liberation (LMCD0324); Formats: CD, digital download	32
Stardust Blues	Released: 10 August 2020; Label: Fake Moustache, Husky (HUSK004); Formats: CD, digital download	-

=== Demos ===
Title	Details
Quiet Little Rage	Released: 2008; Label: Echo Music Consulting & Management (ECH001); Formats: CD, digital download

=== Extended plays ===
Title	Details
Bedroom Recordings	Released: 20 October 2017; Label: Liberation; Format: digital download

=== Singles ===
==== As lead artist ====
Title	Year	Album
"Dark Sea"	2011	Forever So
"History's Door"	2011	Forever So
"The Woods"	2012	Forever So
"I'm Not Coming Back"	2014	Ruckers Hill
"Saint Joan"	2014	Ruckers Hill
"Drunk"	2015	Ruckers Hill
"Late Night Store"	2016	Punchbuzz
"Ghost"	2017	Punchbuzz
"Walking in Your Sleep"	2018	non album single
"Sywd"	2020	Stardust Blues
"Cut Myself Loose"	2020	Stardust Blues
"Wristwatch"	2020	Stardust Blues
"Light a Cigarette"	2020	Stardust Blues
"Meteorite"	2021	TBA
"Devil on the Dresser"	2023	TBA
"Where Am I"	2023	TBA
"How to Forget"	2024	TBA

==== As featured artist ====
Title	Year	Peak chart positions	Album
Title	Year	FRA	Album
"The Sound of Silence" (RocKwiz featuring Emma Louise & Husky)	2012	148	Sunday Morning

== Awards and nominations ==
=== AIR Awards ===
The Australian Independent Record Awards (commonly known informally as AIR Awards) is an annual awards night to recognise, promote and celebrate the success of Australia's Independent Music sector.

Year	Nominee / work	Award	Result
2012	themselves	Breakthrough Independent Artist	Nominated

=== APRA Awards ===
The APRA Awards are held in Australia and New Zealand by the Australasian Performing Right Association to recognise songwriting skills, sales and airplay performance by its members annually.

Year	Nominee / work	Award	Result
2013	themselves	Professional Development Awards (Pop)	Won

=== ARIA Music Awards ===
The ARIA Music Awards is an annual awards ceremony that recognises excellence, innovation, and achievement across all genres of Australian music.

Year	Nominee / work	Award	Result
2012	Forever So	Best Adult Contemporary Album	Nominated

=== EG Awards / Music Victoria Awards ===
The EG Awards (known as Music Victoria Awards since 2013) are an annual awards night celebrating Victorian music. They commenced in 2006.

Year	Nominee / work	Award	Result
2012	Husky	Best Band	Nominated
2012	Husky	Outstanding Achievement By a Victorian Artist	Nominated

=== J Award ===
The J Awards are an annual series of Australian music awards that were established by the Australian Broadcasting Corporation's youth-focused radio station Triple J. They commenced in 2005.

Year	Nominee / work	Award	Result
2011	themselves	Unearthed Artist of the Year	Nominated

=== Vanda & Young Global Songwriting Competition ===
The Vanda & Young Global Songwriting Competition is an annual competition that "acknowledges great songwriting whilst supporting and raising money for Nordoff-Robbins" and is coordinated by Albert Music and APRA AMCOS. It commenced in 2009.

Year	Nominee / work	Award	Result
2014	"Saint Joan"	Vanda & Young Global Songwriting Competition	1st
