= Pete Hawkes =

Australian composer and musician (born 1965)

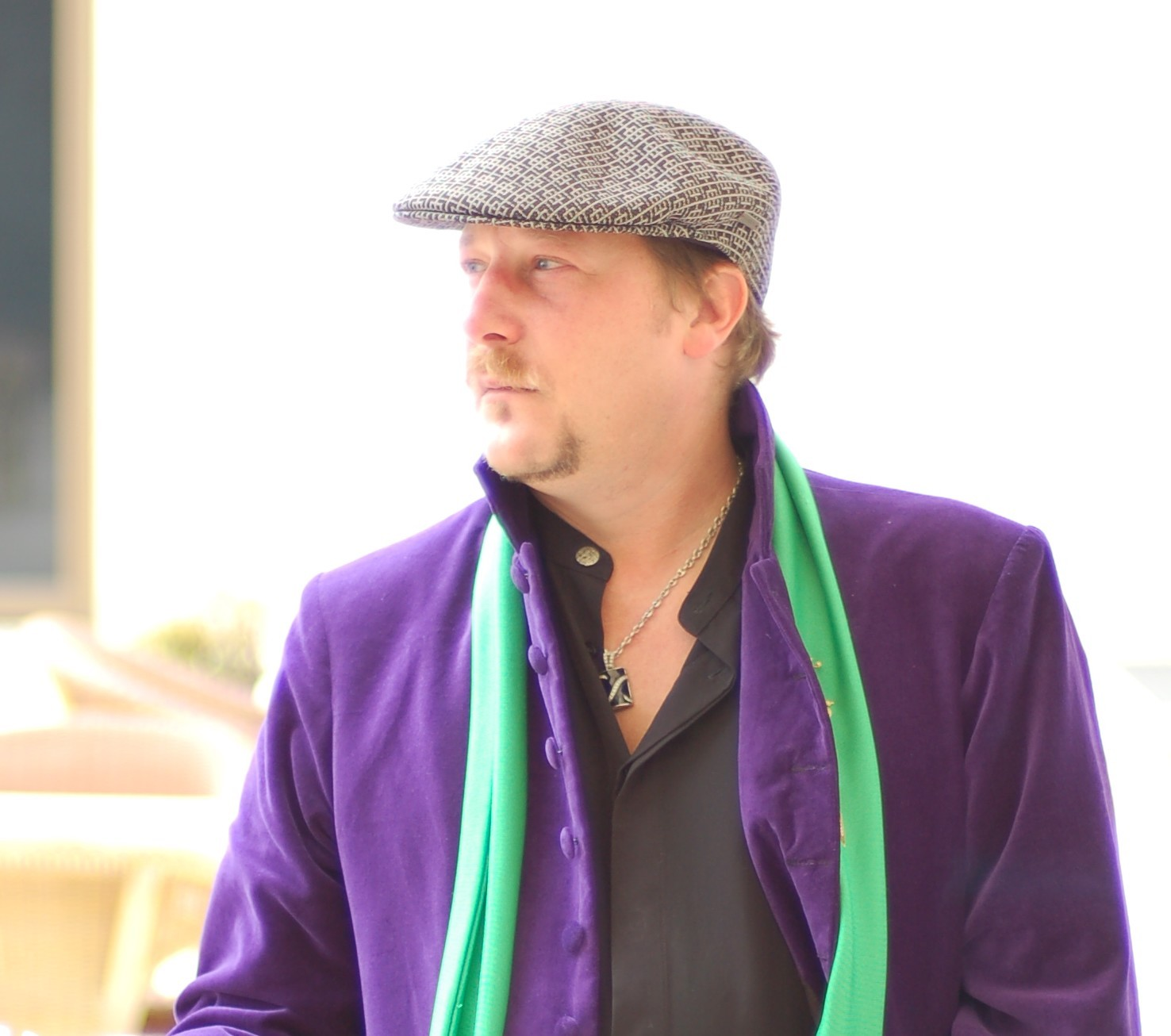
Pete Hawkes in 2012

Pete Hawkes (born 28 May 1965) is an Australian composer, poet, musician and luthier. There are over 50 recordings by Hawkes, covering a wide range of genres. He has collaborated with Bert Jansch, Joe Cocker, Phil Emmanuel, Steeleye Span and Dave Swarbrick.

Hawkes has been featured in a number of music and guitar magazines and some of his musical works have been kept for preservation at the National Film and Sound Archive of Australia. Hawkes has chromesthesia, a form of synesthesia where he sees sound in colors.

== Early life ==
Hawkes was born in 1965 at Lake Macquarie, Australia. He learned to play guitar on an old waterlogged guitar, nicknamed "The Paddle" because his father used it to paddle home one night when he was drunk. He learned guitar by listening to old albums, citing influences as diverse as blues guitarist Robert Johnson, English guitarist Davey Graham, and Bartók.

== Career ==
In the mid-1990s he recorded his debut album, Secrets Vows and Lies, with English folk violinist Dave Swarbrick playing on a few tracks. The album was released by Festival Records and was critically well received.

Hawkes toured Australia and supported Steeleye Span and Bert Jansch, but the tour was largely unsuccessful. Afterwards, Hawkes moved to London. Secrets Vows and Lies was released in the UK by Select Records and he started playing in small clubs and hotels throughout the UK. He briefly reconnected with Dave Swarbrick in Coventry and supported him and Martin Carthy and in Scarborough, North Yorkshire with violinist Sue Aston.

After returning to Australia, Hawkes released Unspoken Riddles, Melancholy Cello (inspired by Russian music), and Double Diversity. He then concentrated on composing and arranging. In 2006 he released Witchcraft, an orchestral suite, and The Jazz Chronicles. In 2009 he released The Lost Souls Entwined, a gothic rock album recorded with electric guitarist Phil Emmanuel.

Hawkes has created over 50 recordings covering folk music, jazz, jazz fusion, classical, world music, rock, ragtime, blues, ambient, and baroque. He has collaborated with Bert Jansch, Joe Cocker, Phil Emmanuel, and Dave Swarbrick. Music journalist Bruce Elder has compared his folk-blues style to Nick Drake and John Martyn.

Hawkes has been featured in a number of music and guitar magazines. Some of his works have been kept for preservation at the National Film and Sound Archive of Australia.

He is a member of the Australian Performance Rights Association (APRA).

Hawkes has also worked as a data analyst at the University of Newcastle.

== Awards ==
In 2002, Hawkes won the ABC Newcastle Songwriter of the Year Award, and in 2009 he won another ABC award for his instrumental works. In 2012 he received a MUSICOZ Legend award. In 2017, Hawkes won the Festival of Original Music Award (FOOM) from the Song Writers, Composers & Lyricists Association (SCALA). He was a finalist at the Australian Songwriters Association Awards in 2001, 2012, 2014, 2015, and 2016.
