= Little by Little: Collectors Edition =

EP by Robert Plant
- Released: 18 November 1985
- Recorded: 1984–1985
- Genre: Rock
- Length: 23:23
- Label: Es Paranza
- Producer: Robert Plant, Benji Lefevre, Tim Palmer

Little by Little: Collectors Edition is an EP by Robert Plant released in 1985.

== Track listing ==
=== Side one ===
1. "Little by Little" (remix long version) (Robert Plant, Jezz Woodroffe) – 5:10
2. "Easily Lead" (Plant, Paul Martinez, Woodroffe) – 7:52

=== Side two ===
1. "Rockin' at Midnight" (Roy Brown) – 4:17
2. "Sixes and Sevens" (Plant, Martinez, Woodroffe, Richard Hayward) – 6:04

Side one, track two and side two, track one recorded live in Dallas, Texas on 24 June 1985.
