= Collaboration (Tommy Emmanuel album) =

Studio album by Tommy Emmanuel
- Released: October 1998
- Genre: Pop
- Label: Sony Music Australia

Tommy Emmanuel chronology
| The Day Finger Pickers Took Over the World (1997) | Collaboration (1998) | Only (2000) |

Collaboration is a studio album by Australian musician Tommy Emmanuel and other Australian artists. The album was released in October 1998 and peaked at number 51 on the ARIA charts. "After The Love Has Gone" was released as single and peaked at number 74 on the ARIA Charts.

== Track listing ==
| No. | Title | Writer(s) | Length |
|---|---|---|---|
| 1. | "Fiesta" (with Slava Grigoryan) | | 4:22 |
| 2. | "Mary Had a Little Jam" (with James Morrison) | | 3:54 |
| 3. | "After the Love Has Gone" (with CDB) | David Foster, Jay Graydon, Bill Champlin | 4:19 |
| 4. | "Workin' Man Blues" (with Troy Cassar-Daley) | Merle Haggard | 4:27 |
| 5. | "Imagine" (with Human Nature) | John Lennon | 4:25 |
| 6. | "Amanda's Room" (with Ben Northey) | | 4:30 |
| 7. | "For the First Time" (with Rick Price) | James Newton Howard, Jud J. Friedman, Allan Dennis Rich | 5:06 |
| 8. | "Reminiscing" (with Glenn Shorrock) | Graeham Goble | 4:41 |
| 9. | "Change for Good" (with Randy Goodrum) | | 3:57 |
| 10. | "Last Time I Saw You" (with Ben Northey) | | 4:35 |
| 11. | "Smokey Mountain Lullaby" (with Chet Atkins) | Chet Atkins | 3:28 |
| 12. | "Imagine (reprise) " (with Human Nature) | Lennon | 0:54 |

== Charts ==
| Chart (1998) | Peak position |
|---|---|
| Australian Albums (ARIA) | 51 |
