= ARIA Award for Best Adult Contemporary Album =

Annual Australian music industry award

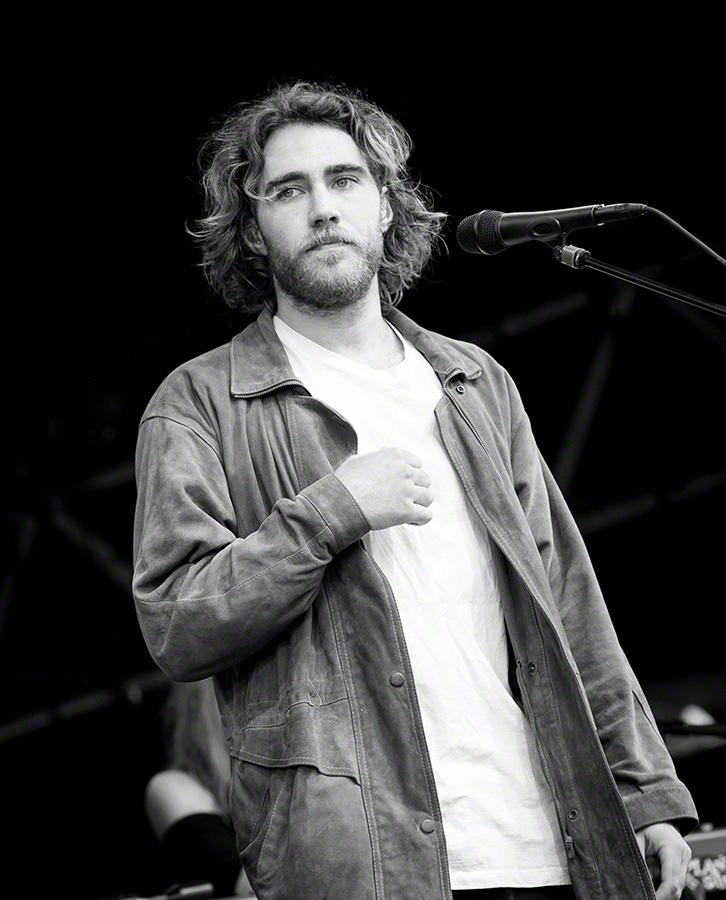
- 2026 winner Matt Corby
- Country: Australia
- Presented by: Australian Recording Industry Association (ARIA)
- First award: 1987
- Currently held by: Matt Corby, Tragic Magic (2026)

Highlights
- Most wins: Paul Kelly (5)
- Most nominations: Paul Kelly (11)
- Website: ariaawards.com.au

The ARIA Music Award for Best Adult Contemporary Album is an award presented at the annual ARIA Music Awards, which recognises "the many achievements of Aussie artists across all music genres", since 1987. It is handed out by the Australian Recording Industry Association (ARIA), an organisation whose aim is "to advance the interests of the Australian record industry."

Solo artists and groups are eligible if they are an Australian citizen, have resided in Australia for six months for two consecutive years prior to the awards, or signed to an Australian record label (if they have met the aforementioned criteria). Only album recordings in the adult contemporary genre are eligible. The nominees and winners are chosen by a judging academy which comprises 1000 members from different areas of the music industry.

Paul Kelly has both the most wins with five and the most nominations with 11. John Farnham is the only artist with two consecutive wins, which he achieved for Whispering Jack as the inaugural winner in 1987 and "Touch of Paradise" in 1988. My Friend the Chocolate Cake won both of their nominations, becoming the only artist to achieve this feat. Welsh singer Tom Jones was nominated for the collaborative live album John Farnham & Tom Jones – Together in Concert in 2005, making him the only non-Australian nominee.

== Winners and nominees ==
In the following table, the winner is highlighted in a separate colour, and in boldface; the nominees are those that are not highlighted or in boldface.

Winner marked in a separate colour

Year	Winner(s)	Album Title
**1987** (1st)
**1987** (1st)	**John Farnham**	**Whispering Jack**
**1987** (1st)	Dragon	Dreams of Ordinary Men
**1987** (1st)	Mondo Rock	Boom Baby Boom
**1987** (1st)	The Reels	"Bad Moon Rising"
**1987** (1st)	Vince Jones	Tell Me a Secret
**1988** (2nd)	**John Farnham**	**"Touch of Paradise"**
**1989** (3rd)
**1989** (3rd)	**Crowded House**	**Temple of Low Men**
**1989** (3rd)	The Black Sorrows	Hold On To Me
**1989** (3rd)	Kate Ceberano & Wendy Matthews	You've Always Got the Blues
**1989** (3rd)	John Farnham	Age of Reason
**1989** (3rd)	Little River Band	Monsoon
**1990** (4th)
**1990** (4th)	**Stephen Cummings**	**A New Kind of Blue**
**1990** (4th)	Dragon	Bondi Road
**1990** (4th)	Not Drowning, Waving	Claim
**1990** (4th)	Paul Kelly & The Messengers	So Much Water So Close To Home
**1990** (4th)	John Williamson	Warragul
**1991** (5th)
**1991** (5th)	**Vince Jones** and **Grace Knight**	**Come In Spinner**
**1991** (5th)	Andrew Pendlebury	Zing Went the Strings
**1991** (5th)	Marc Hunter	Night & Day
**1991** (5th)	Original Cast Recording	Paris
**1991** (5th)	Tommy Emmanuel	Dare to Be Different
**1992** (6th)
**1992** (6th)	**Tommy Emmanuel**	**Determination**
**1992** (6th)	Debbie Byrne	Caught in the Act
**1992** (6th)	Grace Knight	Stormy Weather
**1992** (6th)	Monica & the Moochers	Cotton on the Breeze
**1992** (6th)	John Williamson	Waratah St
**1993** (7th)
**1993** (7th)	**Andrew Pendlebury**	**Don't Hold Back That Feeling**
**1993** (7th)	Marina Prior	Aspects of Andrew Lloyd Webber
**1993** (7th)	Various Artists	Stairways to Heaven
**1993** (7th)	Various Artists	Strictly Ballroom
**1993** (7th)	Anthony Warlow	On the Boards
**1994** (8th)
**1994** (8th)	**Tommy Emmanuel**	**The Journey**
**1994** (8th)	James Blundell	Touch of Water
**1994** (8th)	Grace Knight	Gracious
**1994** (8th)	Rick Price and Margaret Urlich	"Where Is the Love?"
**1994** (8th)	The Seekers	25 Year Reunion Celebration
**1995** (9th)
**1995** (9th)	**My Friend the Chocolate Cake**	**Brood** (Note: ARIA lists "I've Got a Plan" as the winner of 'Best Adult Contemporary Album' category. "I've Got a Plan" is an album track on Brood.)
**1995** (9th)	The Black Sorrows	Lucky Charm
**1995** (9th)	Phil Emmanuel and Tommy Emmanuel	Terra Firma
**1995** (9th)	Dave Hole	Steel on Steel
**1995** (9th)	Wendy Matthews	The Witness Tree
**1996** (10th)
**1996** (10th)	**John Farnham**	**Romeo's Heart**
**1996** (10th)	Kate Ceberano	Change
**1996** (10th)	Stephen Cummings	Escapist
**1996** (10th)	Tommy Emmanuel	Classical Gas
**1996** (10th)	Mick Harvey	Intoxicated Man
**1997** (11th)
**1997** (11th)	**My Friend The Chocolate Cake**	**Good Luck**
**1997** (11th)	Annie Crummer	Seventh Wave
**1997** (11th)	Tommy Emmanuel	Can't Get Enough
**1997** (11th)	Ed Kuepper	Starstruck
**1997** (11th)	Vika and Linda	Princess Tabu
**1998** (12th)
**1998** (12th)	**Archie Roach**	**Looking for Butter Boy**
**1998** (12th)	David Campbell	Taking the Wheel
**1998** (12th)	Colin Hay	Transcendental Highway
**1998** (12th)	The Killjoys	Sun Bright Deep
**1998** (12th)	Wendy Matthews	Ghosts
**1999** (13th)
**1999** (13th)	**Jimmy Little**	**Messenger**
**1999** (13th)	Frank Bennett	Cash Landing
**1999** (13th)	The Black Sorrows	Beat Club
**1999** (13th)	John Farnham, Olivia Newton-John and Anthony Warlow	Highlights from The Main Event
**1999** (13th)	Renée Geyer	Sweet Life
**2000** (14th)
**2000** (14th)	**Karma County**	**Into the Land of Promise**
**2000** (14th)	Marcia Hines	The Time of Our Lives
**2000** (14th)	Icecream Hands	Sweeter Than the Radio
**2000** (14th)	Michael Spiby	Ho's Kitchen
**2000** (14th)	Vika and Linda	Two Wings
**2001** (15th)
**2001** (15th)	**Mark Seymour**	**One Eyed Man**
**2001** (15th)	Jodi Phillis	In Dreams I Live
**2001** (15th)	John Farnham	33 1/3
**2001** (15th)	Stella One Eleven	In Your Hands
**2001** (15th)	Wendy Matthews	Beautiful View
**2002** (16th)
**2002** (16th)	**Paul Kelly**	**Nothing But a Dream**
**2002** (16th)	Archie Roach	Sensual Being
**2002** (16th)	Jimmy Little	Resonate
**2002** (16th)	Lisa Miller	Car Tape
**2002** (16th)	Vika and Linda	Love is Mighty Close
**2003** (17th)
**2003** (17th)	**John Farnham**	**The Last Time**
**2003** (17th)	Blackeyed Susans	Shangri-La
**2003** (17th)	David Bridie	Hotel Radio
**2003** (17th)	The Go-Betweens	Bright Yellow Bright Orange
**2003** (17th)	Renée Geyer	Tenderland
**2004** (18th)
**2004** (18th)	**Paul Kelly**	**Ways & Means**
**2004** (18th)	Diesel	Singled Out
**2004** (18th)	Jimmy Little	Life's What You Make It
**2004** (18th)	george	Unity
**2004** (18th)	Lisa Miller	Version Originale
**2005** (19th)
**2005** (19th)	**The Go-Betweens**	**Oceans Apart**
**2005** (19th)	Architecture in Helsinki	In Case We Die
**2005** (19th)	John Farnham and Tom Jones	Together in Concert
**2005** (19th)	Renée Geyer	Tonight
**2005** (19th)	The Church	El Momento Descuidado
**2006** (20th)
**2006** (20th)	**Bob Evans**	**Suburban Songbook**
**2006** (20th)	Human Nature	Reach Out: The Motown Record
**2006** (20th)	Tex, Don and Charlie	All Is Forgiven
**2006** (20th)	The Whitlams	Little Cloud
**2006** (20th)	Various Artists	She Will Have Her Way: The Songs of Tim & Neil Finn
**2007** (21st)
**2007** (21st)	**Josh Pyke**	**Memories & Dust**
**2007** (21st)	Art of Fighting	Runaways
**2007** (21st)	Lisa Miller	Morning in the Bowl of Night
**2007** (21st)	New Buffalo	Somewhere, Anywhere
**2007** (21st)	Paul Kelly	Stolen Apples
**2008** (22nd)
**2008** (22nd)	**The Panics**	**Cruel Guards**
**2008** (22nd)	Clare Bowditch	The Moon Looked On
**2008** (22nd)	Jimmy Barnes	Out in the Blue
**2008** (22nd)	Katie Noonan	Skin
**2008** (22nd)	Robert Forster	The Evangelist
**2009** (23rd)
**2009** (23rd)	**Josh Pyke**	**Chimney's Afire**
**2009** (23rd)	Bob Evans	Goodnight, Bull Creek!
**2009** (23rd)	David Campbell	Good Lovin!
**2009** (23rd)	Little Birdy	Confetti
**2009** (23rd)	Paul Dempsey	Everything Is True
**2010** (24th)
**2010** (24th)	**Crowded House**	**Intriguer**
**2010** (24th)	Angie Hart	Eat My Shadow
**2010** (24th)	Jimmy Barnes	The Rhythm and the Blues
**2010** (24th)	Lisa Miller	Car Tape 2
**2010** (24th)	Perry Keyes	Johnny Ray's Downtown
**2011** (25th)
**2011** (25th)	**Billy Thorpe**	**Tangier**
**2011** (25th)	Colin Hay	Gathering Mercury
**2011** (25th)	Damien Leith	Roy
**2011** (25th)	John Farnham	Jack
**2011** (25th)	Mark Seymour & the Undertow	Undertow
**2012** (26th)
**2012** (26th)	**Missy Higgins**	**The Ol' Razzle Dazzle**
**2012** (26th)	Darren Hayes	Secret Codes and Battleships
**2012** (26th)	Husky	Forever So
**2012** (26th)	Josh Pyke	Only Sparrows
**2012** (26th)	Katie Noonan and Karin Schaupp	Songs of the Southern Skies
**2013** (27th)
**2013** (27th)	**Nick Cave and the Bad Seeds**	**Push the Sky Away**
**2013** (27th)	Bob Evans	Familiar Stranger
**2013** (27th)	Clare Bowditch	The Winter I Chose Happiness
**2013** (27th)	Josh Pyke	The Beginning and the End of Everything
**2013** (27th)	Sarah Blasko	I Awake
**2014** (28th)
**2014** (28th)	**Neil Finn & Paul Kelly**	**Goin' Your Way**
**2014** (28th)	Gossling	Harvest of Gold
**2014** (28th)	Kate Miller-Heidke	O Vertigo!
**2014** (28th)	Nick Cave and the Bad Seeds	Live from KCRW
**2014** (28th)	Tina Arena	Reset
**2015** (29th)
**2015** (29th)	**Oh Mercy**	**When We Talk About Love**
**2015** (29th)	John Farnham and Olivia Newton-John	Two Strong Hearts Live
**2015** (29th)	Megan Washington	There There
**2015** (29th)	Paul Kelly	The Merri Soul Sessions
**2015** (29th)	Szymon	Tigersapp
**2016** (30th)
**2016** (30th)	**Bernard Fanning**	**Civil Dusk**
**2016** (30th)	Bob Evans	Car Boot Sale
**2016** (30th)	Paul Kelly	Seven Sonnets & a Song
**2016** (30th)	Robert Forster	Songs to Play
**2016** (30th)	Tina Arena	Eleven
**2017** (31st)
**2017** (31st)	**Paul Kelly**	**Life Is Fine**
**2017** (31st)	Bernard Fanning	Brutal Dawn
**2017** (31st)	D.D Dumbo	Utopia Defeated
**2017** (31st)	Nick Cave & the Bad Seeds	Skeleton Tree
**2017** (31st)	Pete Murray	Camacho
**2018** (32nd)
**2018** (32nd)	**Vance Joy**	**Nation of Two**
**2018** (32nd)	Courtney Barnett and Kurt Vile	Lotta Sea Lice
**2018** (32nd)	Dan Sultan	Killer Under a Blood Moon
**2018** (32nd)	Missy Higgins	Solastalgia
**2018** (32nd)	Odette	To a Stranger
**2019** (33rd)
**2019** (33rd)	**Paul Kelly**	**Nature**
**2019** (33rd)	Julia Jacklin	Crushing
**2019** (33rd)	Samantha Jade	The Magic of Christmas
**2019** (33rd)	Seeker Lover Keeper	Wild Seeds
**2019** (33rd)	The Paper Kites	On the Corner Where You Live
**2020** (34th)
**2020** (34th)	**Archie Roach**	**Tell Me Why**
**2020** (34th)	Donny Benét	Mr Experience
**2020** (34th)	Gordi	Our Two Skins
**2020** (34th)	Josh Pyke	Rome
**2020** (34th)	Nick Cave and the Bad Seeds	Ghosteen
**2021** (35th)
**2021** (35th)	**Crowded House**	**Dreamers Are Waiting**
**2021** (35th)	Big Scary	Daisy
**2021** (35th)	Kylie Minogue	Disco
**2021** (35th)	Nick Cave & Warren Ellis	Carnage
**2021** (35th)	Odette	Herald
**2022** (36th)
**2022** (36th)	**Julia Jacklin**	**Pre Pleasure**
**2022** (36th)	Alex the Astronaut	How to Grow a Sunflower Underwater
**2022** (36th)	Missy Higgins	Total Control
**2022** (36th)	Vance Joy	In Our Own Sweet Time
**2022** (36th)	Vika and Linda	The Wait
**2023** (37th)
**2023** (37th)	**Dan Sultan**	**Dan Sultan**
**2023** (37th)	Alex Lahey	The Answer Is Always Yes
**2023** (37th)	Kate Ceberano	My Life Is a Symphony
**2023** (37th)	Mo'Ju	Oro, Plata, Mata
**2023** (37th)	Tina Arena	Love Saves
**2024** (38th)
**2024** (38th)	**Emily Wurramara**	**Nara**
**2024** (38th)	Angus & Julia Stone	Cape Forestier
**2024** (38th)	Crowded House	Gravity Stairs
**2024** (38th)	Emma Donovan	Til My Song Is Done
**2024** (38th)	Fanning Dempsey National Park	The Deluge
**2025** (39th)
**2025** (39th)	**Missy Higgins**	**The Second Act**
**2025** (39th)	Folk Bitch Trio	Now Would Be a Good Time
**2025** (39th)	Gordi	Like Plasticine
**2025** (39th)	Meg Washington	Gem
**2025** (39th)	Paul Kelly	Fever Longing Still
**2026** (40th)
**2026** (40th)	**Matt Corby**	**Tragic Magic**
**2026** (40th)	Paul Kelly	Seventy
**2026** (40th)	The Paper Kites	If You Go There, I Hope You Find It
**2026** (40th)	Vika and Linda	Where Do You Come From?
**2026** (40th)	Way Dynamic	Massive Shoe

== Artists with multiple wins ==
5 wins

- Paul Kelly

4 wins

- John Farnham

3 wins

- Crowded House

2 wins

- Tommy Emmanuel
- Missy Higgins
- My Friend the Chocolate Cake
- Josh Pyke
- Archie Roach

== Artists with multiple nominations ==
11 nominations

- Paul Kelly

10 nominations

- John Farnham

6 nominations

- Tommy Emmanuel

5 nominations

- Nick Cave (Note: Including four as a member of Nick Cave and the Bad Seeds.)
- Warren Ellis
- Missy Higgins (Note: Including the various artists album She Will Have Her Way.)
- Lisa Miller
- Josh Pyke
- Vika and Linda

4 nominations

- Kate Ceberano (Note: Including the various artists album Stairways to Heaven.)
- Renée Geyer
- Crowded House
- Bob Evans
- Wendy Matthews
- Nick Cave and the Bad Seeds

3 nominations

- Tina Arena
- The Black Sorrows
- Sarah Blasko (Note: Including the various artists album She Will Have Her Way and one nomination for the supergroup Seeker Lover Keeper.)
- Clare Bowditch
- David Bridie (Note: Including two as a member of My Friend the Chocolate Cake.)
- Bernard Fanning (Note: Including The Deluge, a collaborative album credited to Fanning Dempsey National Park.)
- Grace Knight
- Jimmy Little
- New Buffalo
- Archie Roach

2 nominations

- Jimmy Barnes
- David Campbell
- Stephen Cummings
- Paul Dempsey
- Dragon
- Robert Forster
- The Go-Betweens
- Gordi
- Colin Hay
- Julia Jacklin
- Vince Jones
- Vance Joy
- Little Birdy
- My Friend the Chocolate Cake
- Olivia Newton-John
- Katie Noonan
- Odette
- The Paper Kites
- Andrew Pendlebury
- Mark Seymour
- Dan Sultan
- Holly Throsby
- Anthony Warlow
- John Williamson
- John Paul Young (Note: While never nominated for his own releases, Young appears on the various artists albums Stairways to Heaven and Strictly Ballroom, both nominated in 1993.)
