= The Day Finger Pickers Took Over the World =

Studio album by Chet Atkins and Tommy Emmanuel
- Released: 11 March 1997
- Studio: CA Workshop, Nashville, Tennessee
- Genre: Bluegrass; jazz; easy listening
- Length: 36:02
- Label: Columbia

Chet Atkins chronology
Almost Alone (1996)	The Day Finger Pickers Took Over the World (1997)	Guitar Legend: The RCA Years (2000)

Tommy Emmanuel chronology
Can't Get Enough (1996)	The Day Finger Pickers Took Over the World (1997)	Collaboration (1998)

The Day Finger Pickers Took Over the World is an album by American guitarist Chet Atkins and Australian guitarist Tommy Emmanuel. Recorded when Atkins was 73, this was his last release of original material in the 20th century. "Smokey Mountain Lullaby" was nominated for the 1997 Grammy Award for Country Instrumental Performance.

== Reception ==
Professional ratings
Review scores
Source	Rating
AllMusic	4.5/5 stars
The Encyclopedia of Popular Music	3/5 stars
The New Rolling Stone Album Guide	3.5/5 stars

Richard S. Ginell from AllMusic said "Chet Atkins still had another great recording in him." adding "Atkins' tune "Tip Toe Through the Bluegrass" plays the two styles off each other quite revealingly. Emmanuel turns out to be a top-notch tunesmith in his own right, too. His "Dixie McGuire" a disarmingly affectionate mid-tempo tune that won't let you go, inspires a performance that is one of the high points of Atkins'." Ginell said "The title track, which Atkins adapted from a lyric that dealt with bass players finds the two reciting and singing a mock-horror flick tale -- and "Ode to Mel Bay" good-naturedly mocks beginning string players everywhere." Country Standard Time called it "yet another superb collaborative effort."

== Track listing ==
No.	Title	Writer(s)	Length
1.	"Borsalino"	Claude Bolling, Jack Fishman, Pierre Delanoë	3:10
2.	"To 'B' or Not To 'B'"	Chet Atkins, Randy Goodrum	3:20
3.	"The Day Finger Pickers Took Over the World"	Atkins, Dave Pomeroy, Emily Kaitz	3:39
4.	"Tip Toe Through the Bluegrass"	Atkins	3:07
5.	"News from the Outback"	Atkins	3:07
6.	"Ode to Mel Bay"	Atkins, Mark Denny, Michael Granda	2:55
7.	"Dixie McGuire"	Emmanuel	3:50
8.	"Saltwater"	Julian Lennon, Mark Spiro, Leslie Spiro	3:33
9.	"Mr. Guitar"	Emmanuel	2:52
10.	"Road to Gundaghi/Waltzing Matilda"	Traditional, Banjo Patterson	3:01
11.	"Smokey Mountain Lullaby"	Atkins	3:28

== Personnel ==
- Chet Atkins – guitar
- Tommy Emmanuel – guitar, bass, brushes
- Randy Goodrum – keyboards
- Johnny Gimble – fiddle
- Clark Hagen – guitar
- Paul Yandell – guitar
- Giles Reeves – drums, double bass
- Terry McMillan – conga, harmonica, Jew's harp
