= Classical Gas (Tommy Emmanuel album) =

Studio album by Tommy Emmanuel
- Released: 1995
- Label: Columbia

Tommy Emmanuel chronology
Terra Firma (1995)	Classical Gas (1995)	Can't Get Enough (1996)

Classical Gas is an album by Australian guitarist Tommy Emmanuel with the Australian Philharmonic Orchestra. The album peaked at number 6 on the ARIA Charts, becoming Emmanuel's second top ten album. The album was certified gold in Australia.

At the ARIA Music Awards of 1996, the album was nominated for the Best Adult Contemporary Album but lost to Romeo's Heart by John Farnham.

== Track listing ==
All tracks are written by Tommy Emmanuel except where noted

No.	Title	Length
1.	"Classical Gas" (Mason Williams)	5:03
2.	"The Journey"	5:21
3.	"Run a Good Race"	3:57
4.	"Concierto de Aranjuez" (Joaquin Rodrigo)	4:43
5.	"She Never Knew"	3:37
6.	"Gollywogs Cake Walk" (Claude Debussy)	2:45
7.	"Who Dares Wins"	5:53
8.	"Initiation"	5:26
9.	"The Hunt"	3:59
10.	"Town Hall Shuffle" (Joe Maphis)	2:26
11.	"Countrywide"	3:44
12.	"Pan Man" (Steve Erquiaga)	3:57
13.	"Padre"	3:18

== Personnel ==
- Tommy Emmanuel – guitar
- Rob Little - Bass
- Kevin Murphy - Drums
- Rex Goh - Electric Guitar
- James Roche - Keyboards
- Australian Philharmonic Orchestra
- Slava Grigoryan – guitar (Track 12)

== Charts ==
Chart (1996)	Peak position
Australian Albums (ARIA)	6

== Certifications ==
Region	Certification	Certified units/sales
Australia (ARIA)	Gold	35,000
