= Can't Get Enough (Tommy Emmanuel album) =

Studio album by Tommy Emmanuel
- Released: 1996
- Genre: Jazz
- Length: 40:54
- Label: Columbia
- Producer: Tommy Emmanuel, Randy Goodrum

Tommy Emmanuel chronology
Classical Gas (1995)	Can't Get Enough (1996)	The Day Finger Pickers Took Over the World (1997)

Can't Get Enough is an album by Australian guitarist Tommy Emmanuel that was released in Australia in October 1996 and peaked at number 26 on the ARIA Charts. The album was renamed Midnight Drive for its American release.

At the ARIA Music Awards of 1997, the album was nominated for the ARIA Award for Best Adult Contemporary Album but lost to Good Luck by My Friend the Chocolate Cake.

== Reception ==
Professional ratings
Review scores
Source	Rating
AllMusic	link

Jonathan Widran from AllMusic said "The overall mix is the kind that smooth jazz lovers find easy to swallow, but offers more bite and adventure than most like-minded releases in the genre. Smooth jazz radio may find an easy mark with a laid-back take of Sting's "Fields of Gold" but Emmanuel's other tracks dig deeper, showing off a stylistic chameleon drawing from the many phases of his career. His soft pop side comes out on power ballads "No More Goodbyes" and "Stay Close to Me" adding "He darts in a lot of directions, and that willingness... sets him apart from those who make their marks just playing the same old lines."

== Track listing ==
All tracks are written by Tommy Emmanuel and Randy Goodrum except where noted

No.	Title	Length
1.	"Can't Get Enough"	4:29
2.	"No More Goodbyes"	4:06
3.	"Song For Nature" (Emmanuel, David Hirshfelder)	5:03
4.	"Stay Close to Me" (Emmanuel)	3:12
5.	"Villa De Martin"	4:25
6.	"Change for Good"	3:59
7.	"Midnight Drive"	4:10
8.	"The Inner Voice"	4:24
9.	"Reggie's Groove" (Emmanuel, Peter Bowman)	4:26
10.	"Drivetime" (Emmanuel)	3:07
11.	"Red Velvet Cake"	3:06
12.	"How Many Sleeps"	3:39
13.	"Fields of Gold" (Sting)	3:39

== Personnel ==
- Tommy Emmanuel – guitar
- Warren Hill – saxophone
- Randy Goodrum – organ, piano, keyboards
- James Roche – guitar, percussion, keyboards
- Larry Carlton – guitar
- Robben Ford – guitar
- Nathan East – bass guitar, keyboards, programming
- Tom Brechtlein – guitar, drums
- Janine Maunder – vocals
- Kevin Murphy – vocals

== Charts ==
Chart (1996–97)	Peak position
Australian Albums (ARIA)	26
