= It's Never Too Late (Tommy Emmanuel album) =

Studio album by Tommy Emmanuel
- Released: 7 August 2015
- Genre: Folk; country; world
- Length: 46:15
- Label: CGP Sounds; Sony Music Australia

Tommy Emmanuel chronology
Just Passing Through (2015)	It's Never Too Late (2015)	Christmas Memories (2016)

It's Never Too Late is the 23rd studio album by Australian guitarist Tommy Emmanuel. The album was released in August 2015 and is the first regular studio album featuring Emmanuel completely solo since 2000. The album peaked at number 31 in Australia.

== Reception ==
Professional ratings
Review scores
Source	Rating
The Music	3.5/5 stars
Renowned for Sound	4.5/5 stars

Lukas Murphy from The Music said "Ever the innovator with his six steel strings, Tommy Emmanuel's exploration of the acoustic realm continues with his latest release. Boldly emblazoning every musical nuance and idea he can conjure, Emmanuel plays with a practiced expertise that is dispersed throughout the record. From Celtic ballads to straight-up blues, right through to more pop-oriented numbers, the self-confessed guitarist-with-the-mind-of-a-drummer shows just how much variety one instrument standing alone can truly have. With this release, Emmanuel once again sets an example for every aspiring guitarist to strive towards."

Maggie Morris from Renowned for Sound wrote: "An undeniable visionary with his instrument, Emmanuel not only explores different styles, but evokes a spectrum of distinctive emotions with visceral rawness. When Emmanuel performs completely solo his outstanding, raw expertise is highlighted even more; the man is able to sing, strum, and drum not only with a single instrument, but in a single moment. It's Never Too Late is not only a solid and brilliant example for any aspiring instrumentalist; studied guitarists and everyday music fans alike will admire and enjoy it."

== Track listing ==
No.	Title	Writer(s)	Length
1.	"Only Elliot"	Tommy Emmanuel	2:00
2.	"It's Never Too Late"	Emmanuel	3:31
3.	"The Bug"	Emmanuel	1:58
4.	"El Vaquero"	Chet Atkins, Wayne Moss	2:07
5.	"Hope Street"	Emmanuel	3:26
6.	"Blood Brother"	Emmanuel	4:52
7.	"Miyazaki's Dream"	Clara Emmanuel, Emmanuel	4:19
8.	"One Day"	Martin Taylor	3:32
9.	"Traveling Clothes"	Emmanuel	2:39
10.	"TE Ranch"	Emmanuel	2:29
11.	"Hellos and Goodbyes"	Emmanuel, Virgil Donati	4:22
12.	"One Mint Julep"	Rudy Toombs	3:40
13.	"The Duke"	Emmanuel	3:23
14.	"Old Photographs"	Emmanuel	3:57

== Charts ==
Chart (2015)	Peak position
Australian Albums (ARIA)	31

== Release history ==
Country	Date	Format	Label	Catalogue
Australia	7 August 2015	Digital download, Compact Disc	Sony Music Australia	88875134532
