= Determination (Tommy Emmanuel album) =

Tommy Emmanuel

Studio album by Tommy Emmanuel
- Released: October 1991
- Recorded: 1991
- Studio: Studios 301
- Genre: Rock; blues
- Label: Mega
- Producer: Robie Porter

Tommy Emmanuel chronology
Dare to Be Different (1990)	Tommy Emmanuel (1991)	The Journey (1993)

Determination is an album by Australian guitarist Tommy Emmanuel. Released in October 1991, the album peaked at number 17 on the ARIA Charts, becoming his second top twenty album. The album was certified platinum in Australia in 1992.

In 1992 the album won the Best Adult Contemporary Album. It was also nominated for Best Male Artist but lost to Soul Deep by Jimmy Barnes.

"Stevie's Blues" won Jazz Composition of the Year at the 1992 APRA Music awards.

== Track listing ==
All tracks are written by Tommy Emmanuel except where noted

No.	Title	Length
1.	"Who Dares Wins"	5:22
2.	"Mountain of Truth" (Emmanuel, Roger Mason)	4:49
3.	"Determination"	4:47
4.	"'Cross the Nullabor"	4:24
5.	"Initiation"	4:17
6.	"From the Hip"	4:34
7.	"Imagine" (John Lennon)	3:25
8.	"When You Come Home"	4:33
9.	"Fiesta"	3:52
10.	"Precious Time"	3:04
11.	"The Sweetest Love" (Emmanuel, Sam McNally)	5:41
12.	"Stevie's Blues"	4:22
13.	"Nu Shoos Blues"	3:49

== Charts ==
Chart (1991–93)	Peak position
Australian Albums (ARIA)	17

== Certifications ==
Region	Certification	Certified units/sales
Australia (ARIA)	Platinum	70,000^{^}
^{^} Shipments figures based on certification alone.
