= Stevie's Blues =

Single by Tommy Emmanuel

from the album Determination
- A-side: "Stevie's Blues"
- Released: 1991
- Genre: Blues
- Length: 4:21
- Label: Mega Records
- Songwriter(s): Tommy Emmanuel
- Producer(s): Robie Porter

Tommy Emmanuel singles chronology
"Guitar Boogie" (1990)	"Stevie's Blues" (1991)	"The Journey" (1993)

"Stevie's Blues" is a song written and recorded by Australian musician Tommy Emmanuel for his studio album, Determination. The song peaked at number 93 on the ARIA Charts in May 1992.

"Stevie's Blues" won Jazz Composition of the Year at the APRA Music Awards of 1992.

== Track listing ==
CD single (Mega Records – 6578952)

1. "Stevie's Blues" - 4:21
2. "Initiation" - 4:18
3. "When You Come Home" - 4:30
4. "Stevie's Blues" (acoustic) - 2:22

== Charts ==
Chart (1992)	Peak position
Australia (ARIA)	93
