= Only (album) =

Studio album by Tommy Emmanuel
- Released: August 2000
- Studio: Adalt Tonstudio, Lippstadt, Germany
- Genre: Pop; jazz; folk
- Length: 45:30
- Label: Original Works
- Producer: Rod Tamlyn, Tommy Emmanuel

Tommy Emmanuel chronology
Collaboration (1998)	Only (2000)	The Very Best of Tommy Emmanuel (2001)

Only is a studio album by Australian guitarist Tommy Emmanuel, released in August 2000. The album peaked at number 53 on the ARIA Charts.

== Reception ==
Professional ratings
Review scores
Source	Rating
AllMusic	2.5/5 stars

Jonathan Widran from AllMusic said "His acoustic style is so rustic that listeners even 'hear the wood', so to speak, almost as harmony accents to his melodies. The untrained ear might think there's too much sameness from track to track, but closer listens reveal some interesting mood swings from the dark and hauntingly romantic "Those Who Wait" and "Questions" to more upbeat, folky ramblers like "Timberlake Road" and the truly locomotive "Train to Dusseldorf"."

Minor 7th said "Only a few times in a lifetime does an artist come along who can do such magical things with six wires stretched over a wooden box that you'd swear he or she has a direct conduit to some karmic pool of creativity where access is given to only a special few... Emmanuel is such an artist."

== Track listing ==
All tracks are written by Tommy Emmanuel

No.	Title	Length
1.	"Those Who Wait"	4:20
2.	"I've Always Thought of You"	3:40
3.	"Mombasa"	3:01
4.	"Timberlake Road"	3:04
5.	"Questions"	4:09
6.	"Padré"	4:48
7.	"Luttrell"	2:26
8.	"Since We Met"	3:24
9.	"Drivetime"	3:42
10.	"The Robin"	3:26
11.	"Train to Dusseldorf"	2:31
12.	"Biskie"	1:31
13.	"Stay Close to Me"	2:34
14.	"Ol' Brother Hubbard"	2:58

== Charts ==
Chart (2000)	Peak position
Australian Albums (ARIA)	53
