= Terra Firma (Tommy Emmanuel and Phil Emmanuel album) =

Studio album by Phil Emmanuel and Tommy Emmanuel
- Released: February 1995
- Genre: Rock; pop
- Label: Columbia

Tommy Emmanuel chronology
| Initiation (1995) | Terra Firma (1995) | Classical Gas (1996) |

Terra Firma is an album by Australian guitarist Tommy Emmanuel with his brother Phil that was released in February 1995 and peaked at No. 12 on the ARIA Albums Chart in Australia. The song "(Back on the) Terra Firma" reached No. 45 on the ARIA Singles Chart.

At the ARIA Music Awards of 1995, the album was nominated for the ARIA Award for Best Adult Contemporary Album but lost to Brood by My Friend the Chocolate Cake.

== Track listing ==
| No. | Title | Writer(s) | Length |
|---|---|---|---|
| 1. | "(Back on the) Terra Firma" | John Jorgenson | 5:20 |
| 2. | "Love Gone West" | Phil Emmanuel, Tommy Emmanuel | 4:06 |
| 3. | "Nashville Express" | Peter Posa | 2:51 |
| 4. | "Rondo Ala Turka" | Dave Brubeck | 2:42 |
| 5. | "Theme from "Missing"" | Vangelis | 3:39 |
| 6. | "Happy Go Lucky Guitar" | Buck Owens | 2:36 |
| 7. | "Bendin' It" | Phil Emmanuel | 3:53 |
| 8. | "Optimism Part One" | James Roche | 0:28 |
| 9. | "Shindig" | Hank Marvin, Bruce Welch | 2:08 |
| 10. | "Town Hall Shuffle" | Joe Maphis | 2:26 |
| 11. | "Last Post" | Traditional | 2:10 |
| 12. | "Ashokan Farewell" | Jay Ungar | 3:26 |
| 13. | "Rise and Shine" | Tommy Emmanuel | 3:40 |
| 14. | "Optimism Part Two" | Roche | 1:23 |
| 15. | "The Shaker" | Tommy Emmanuel | 3:21 |
| 16. | "AC/DC Medley: Riff Raff/Let There Be Rock" | | 6:02 |

== Personnel ==
- Tommy Emmanuel – guitar
- Phil Emmanuel – guitar
- Joe Chindamo – accordion
- Broderick Smith – harmonica
- Rob Little – bass guitar
- Kevin Murphy – drums

== Charts ==
| Chart (1995) | Peak position |
|---|---|
| Australian Albums (ARIA) | 12 |
