= Dare to Be Different (album) =

Studio album by Tommy Emmanuel
- Released: 1990
- Studio: Studios 301
- Genre: Rock; blues
- Length: 48:07
- Label: Mega
- Producer: Robie Porter, Rod Tamlyn

Tommy Emmanuel chronology
Up from Down Under (1987)	Dare to Be Different (1990)	Determination (1991)

Dare to Be Different is an album by Australian guitarist Tommy Emmanuel. Released in 1990, the album peaked at number 13 on the ARIA Charts, becoming his first top twenty album. The album was certified gold in Australia in 1992.

At the ARIA Music Awards of 1991, the album was nominated for Best Adult Contemporary Album but lost to Come in Spinner.

== Track listing ==
All tracks are written by Tommy Emmanuel except where noted

No.	Title	Length
1.	"The Rise and Fall of Flingal Bunt" (Bruce Welch, Hank Marvin)	3:48
2.	"Daybreak Again"	4:16
3.	"Jacaranda"	4:28
4.	"Countrywide"	2:52
5.	"Games of Love and Loneliness" (Doug Ashdown, Wayne Findlay)	4:23
6.	"Run a Good Race"	4:15
7.	"Guitar Concierto de Aranjuez" (Joaquín Rodrigo)	3:58
8.	"Tequila Slammer"	3:48
9.	"Hearts Grow Fonder"	4:08
10.	"Blue Moon" (Richard Rodgers, Lorenz Hart)	2:25
11.	"Guitar Boogie" (Arthur Smith)	3:28
12.	"Up from Down Under" (Emmanuel, Alan Mansfield)	5:26
13.	"Raindance"	0:50

== Charts ==
Chart (1990)	Peak position
Australian Albums (ARIA)	13
New Zealand Albums (RMNZ)	39

== Certifications ==
Region	Certification	Certified units/sales
Australia (ARIA)	Gold	35,000^{^}
^{^} Shipments figures based on certification alone.
