= Endless Road =

Studio album by Tommy Emmanuel
- Released: 8 March 2005
- Recorded: 23 October 2004
- Studio: Adalt Studios, Lippstadt, Germany; Azalea Studios, Tennessee
- Length: 66:10
- Label: Favored Nations
- Producer: Kim Person

Tommy Emmanuel chronology
The Very Best of Tommy Emmanuel (2001)	Endless Road (2005)	Live One (2005)

Endless Road is a studio album by Australian guitarist Tommy Emmanuel that was released in May 2004.

Inside the album cover there's this note written by Emmanuel "I dedicate this album to my loving mother, Linda Virginia, who truly has been my hero, my rock, and my teacher, all my life. Though she's in heaven now, I feel her close, every day. Christmas memories/Wheels is especially for her. To my brothers and sisters I'm so grateful to have you in my life, though I don't get to see you all enough, you're always in my heart. My thanks go to so many, I can't say them all. Amanda and Angelina, my daughters, I love you. Gina Madello, Dawn Myers, Henno & Hanne, Pierpaolo and Antonella, Steve Dahl, EAW, Ken starke, Maton Guitars. Steve Vai, Susan Butler, Karen Hogan and all the folks at favored Nations. Special thanks to stephen Bennet for his mix and editing assistance And special love to all my friends and fans all over god's green earth."

"Tall Fiddler" won Instrumental of the Year at the 2005 Country Music Awards of Australia.

== Reception ==
Professional ratings
Review scores
Source	Rating
AllMusic	3.5/5 stars

Stuart Mason from AllMusic said Emmanuel is "at his best when he's working with songs that have stronger melodies than his own competent but unexciting tunes. For example, on the increasingly moldy standard "Over the Rainbow" Emmanuel offers a hint of John Fahey's diffused, abstract style in its intro before moving into a more traditional iteration of the familiar melody. Even better is Emmanuel's flashy but effective reworking of the nearly as hoary "Mona Lisa," which Emmanuel turns into a shimmering, kaleidoscopic version of itself. Not all of the recastings are quite so effective: Emmanuel simply is a far better guitar player than he is a singer, and the a cappella take on Jerry Reed's "Today Is Mine" does neither singer nor song any favours."

Kirk Albrecht from Minor 7th said "The 17 cuts each drip with Tommy's signature style of unmatched technical prowess combined with taste, something lacking in much modern fingerstyle guitar music. He can play as fast as anyone around - just listen to those licks on the bluesy "Sanatorium Shuffle", but as the slower tempo tunes on the disk demonstrate, he doesn't feel the need for pyrotechnics all the time. Emmanuel proves as adept at arranging as he does with his own writing, dazzling in his rendition of "Somewhere Over The Rainbow" with cascading harmonics, pulsating hammer-ons, and arpeggios in all the right places. This is a man at one with a guitar, revealing a level of enjoyment that flows to the listener."

== Track listing ==
All tracks are written by Tommy Emmanuel except where noted.

No.	Title	Length
1.	"Endless Road"	4:32
2.	"Tall Fiddler"	2:38
3.	"(The Man with) The Green Thumb"	3:20
4.	"Bella Soave"	2:22
5.	"Morning Aire"	5:56
6.	"Angelina"	3:41
7.	"Windy & Warm" (John D. Loudermilk)	2:48
8.	"Chet's Ramble" (Emmanuel, Chet Atkins)	2:42
9.	"Son of a Gun"	1:50
10.	"The Robin"	3:26
11.	"La Vista"	3:24
12.	"Mona Lisa" (Ray Evans, Jay Livingston)	3:53
13.	"Christmas Memories/Wheels"	3:23
14.	"Old Town"	3:04
15.	"Somewhere Over the Rainbow" (Harold Arlen, E.Y. Harburg)	4:21
16.	"I Still Can't Say Goodbye"	3:25
17.	"Today Is Mine" (Jerry Reed)	2:48
18.	"Struttin'" (Reed)	2:39
19.	"Pegao" (José Feliciano)	6:20

== Personnel ==
- Tommy Emmanuel – guitar, vocals
- Elizabeth Watkins – background vocals

== Charts ==
Chart (2004)	Peak position
Australian Albums (ARIA)	155
