= Little by Little (Tommy Emmanuel album) =

Studio album by Tommy Emmanuel
- Released: 5 November 2010
- Studio: Azalea Music Studio, Omni Sound Studio
- Length: 83:29
- Label: Sony
- Producer: Kim Person

Tommy Emmanuel chronology
| Just Between Frets (2009) | Little by Little (2010) | All I Want for Christmas (2011) |

Little by Little is an album by Australian guitarist Tommy Emmanuel that was released in 2010.

Emmanuel released interactive video lessons of 16 songs from the album.

== Reception ==
Professional ratings
Review scores
| Source | Rating |
|---|---|
| AllMusic | 3.5/5 stars |
| Premier Guitar | 4.5/5 stars |

William Ruhlmann from AllMusic said "Emmanuel is simply a guitar player, and on Little by Little, he sticks mostly to acoustic guitar, playing mostly original tunes that he has used in concert but not recorded before. He is also mostly solo, although the double-disc length allows him room to share space with guests including singers Pam Rose and Anthony Snape. Among the covers are two versions of "Moon River" one with a bass countermelody, the other with an Emmanuel vocal." adding "He also likes folk-pop; "Papa George" needs only a James Taylor vocal to fit into that category but Little by Little is a tour de force by a musician who usually leaves categories behind."

Jason Shadrick from Premier Guitar said "From the opening notes of "Halfway Home" Tommy Emmanuel bowls you over with his amazing technique and his ability to craft a melody that sticks in your head. Little by Little is an ambitious double album full of everything from delicate Beatles-inspired fingerpicking to the barn-burning instrumentals that have become a cornerstone of his live shows." adding "With so many moving parts on this album, from different guests to genres, Emmanuel has created one of the most accessible albums of his career, one that’s sure to inspire other guitarists to drop the pick more often."

== Track listing ==
All tracks are written by Tommy Emmanuel except where noted

Disc one
| No. | Title | Length |
|---|---|---|
| 1. | "Halfway Home" | 3:12 |
| 2. | "The Jolly Swagman" | 3:04 |
| 3. | "Locomotivation" | 3:15 |
| 4. | "Haba Na Haba" (Emmanuel, Pam Rose) | 4:06 |
| 5. | "Tears for Jerusalem" | 4:16 |
| 6. | "Waiting for a Plane" | 2:43 |
| 7. | "The Fingerlakes" | 3:21 |
| 8. | "Welsh Tornado" | 2:40 |
| 9. | "He Ain't Heavy, He's My Brother" (Sidney Keith Russell) | 3:50 |
| 10. | "The Mighty Mouse" | 1:56 |
| 11. | "Ruby's Eyes" | 3:29 |
| 12. | "Moon River" (Henry Mancini, Johnny Mercer) | 4:05 |

Disc two
| No. | Title | Length |
|---|---|---|
| 1. | "Jack Magic" | 1:57 |
| 2. | "Papa George" | 1:50 |
| 3. | "Haba Na Hava" (Emmanuel, Rose) | 4:26 |
| 4. | "Tapestry" (Carole King) | 4:57 |
| 5. | "Mountains of Illinois" (Chet Atkins, Pat Bergeson) | 3:27 |
| 6. | "The Tennessee Waltz" (Pee Wee King, Redd Stewart) | 2:36 |
| 7. | "Countrywide" | 2:38 |
| 8. | "Moon River" (Mancini, Mercer) | 3:46 |
| 9. | "Willie's Shades" (Doug Ashdown) | 5:37 |
| 10. | "Smokey Mountain Lullaby" (Atkins) | 3:57 |
| 11. | "Guitar Boogie" | 4:11 |
| 12. | "The Trails" | 4:07 |

== Release history ==
| Country | Date | Format | Label |
|---|---|---|---|
| Australia | 5 November 2010 | Digital download, CD | Sony Music Australia |
| United States | 15 February 2011 | Digital download, CD | Favored Nations |
