= Center Stage (Tommy Emmanuel album) =

Live album by Tommy Emmanuel
- Released: 29 April 2008
- Recorded: October 2007
- Venue: Sierra Nevada Brewery in Chico, California
- Genre: Jazz
- Label: Favored Nations

Tommy Emmanuel chronology
The Mystery (2006)	Center Stage (2008)	Just Between Frets (2009)

Center Stage is a live album by Australian guitarist Tommy Emmanuel that was recorded at Sierra Nevada Brewery in Chico, California for the PBS television series Sierra Center Stage. It was released on CD in April 2008 and on DVD in October 2008.

== Track listing ==
All tracks are written by Tommy Emmanuel except where noted

CD1
No.	Title	Length
1.	"The Finger Lakes"	3:37
2.	"Papa George"	1:53
3.	"Train to Düsseldorf"	2:02
4.	"I Go to Rio" (Peter Allen, Adrienne Anderson)	2:18
5.	"Nine Pound Hammer" (Merle Travis)	4:46
6.	"Old Town"	3:02
7.	"And So It Goes" (Billy Joel)	3:23
8.	"Jolly Swagman"	3:03
9.	"Sukiyaki" (Rokusuke Ei, Hachidai Nakamura)	1:34
10.	"Happy Hours"	2:23
11.	"Ruby's Eyes"	4:18
12.	"Beatles Medley" (John Lennon, Paul McCartney, George Harrison)	6:10
13.	"Mombasa"	9:16

CD2
No.	Title	Length
1.	"Workin' Man Blues" (Merle Haggard)	5:29
2.	"Georgia on My Mind" (Hoagy Carmichael, Stuart Gorrell)	5:10
3.	"The House of the Rising Sun" (Traditional)	6:15
4.	"Amazing Grace" (Traditional)	4:20
5.	"Story of Little Boy"	1:35
6.	"Tall Fiddler"	2:23
7.	"Cowboy's Dream"	3:30
8.	"Morning Aire"	5:55
9.	"Initiation"	10:53
10.	"Lenny Bro'"	3:12
11.	"Questions"	3:40

== Charts ==
Chart (2008)	Rank
Australian (ARIA Chart) Top 40 Music DVD	34
