= Tommy Emmanuel =

Australian guitarist (born 1955)

Tommy Emmanuel AM
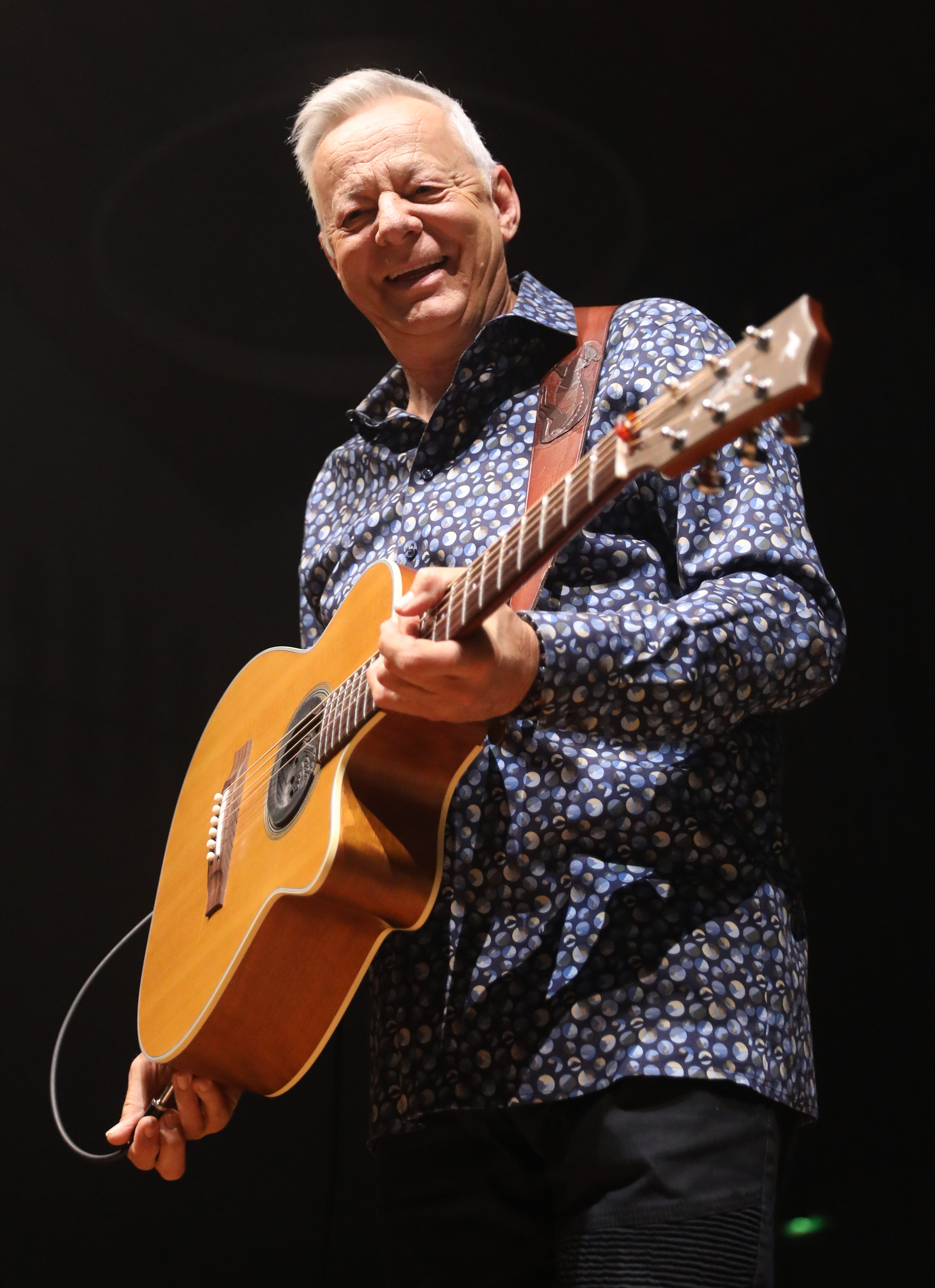
- Emmanuel in Berlin, September 2024

Background information
- Born: William Thomas Emmanuel; 31 May 1955 (age 71); Muswellbrook, New South Wales, Australia
- Genres: Jazz, pop, rock, country
- Occupation: Musician
- Instruments: Guitar, vocals
- Years active: 1962–present
- Labels: Sony, Columbia, Favored Nations
- Website: tommyemmanuel.com

William Thomas Emmanuel AM (born 31 May 1955) is an Australian guitarist. Originally a session player in many bands, he has released many award-winning recordings as a solo artist. In June 2010, Emmanuel was appointed a Member of the Order of Australia (AM); in 2011, he was inducted into the Australian Country Music Roll of Renown. In 2019, he was listed by MusicRadar as the best acoustic guitarist in the world.

== Life and career ==
One of six children, Emmanuel was born in Muswellbrook, New South Wales, Australia, in 1955. He received his first guitar in 1959, at age four, and was taught by his mother to accompany her lap steel guitar playing. In 1961, at the age of six, he heard Chet Atkins playing on the radio. He vividly remembers that moment and said it greatly inspired him as a musician.

By the age of six, he was a working professional musician. Recognizing the musical talents of Emmanuel and his older brother, Phil, their father created a family band, sold their home, and took his family on the road. With the family living in two station wagons, much of Emmanuel's childhood was spent touring Australia, playing rhythm guitar, and rarely going to school. After their father died in 1966, Australian country musician Buddy Williams approached the family and asked permission to take the Emmanuel brothers on the road with his touring show travelling around Australia. Tommy Emmanuel would go on to record a number of Buddy Williams albums in the early 1970s. The family settled in Parkes, New South Wales after the New South Wales Department of Education insisted that the Emmanuel children had to go to school regularly.

In his teen years, Tommy Emmanuel moved to Sydney, and was noticed nationally when he won a string of talent contests. By the late 1970s, he was playing drums with his brother Phil in the group Goldrush as well as doing session work on numerous albums and jingles. He gained further prominence in the late 1970s as the lead guitarist in the Southern Star Band, the backing group for vocalist Doug Parkinson. During 1986–1988 and 1995, he joined the lineup of the leading New Zealand/Australian 1970s rock group Dragon that had reformed in 1982, touring widely with them, including a 1987 tour with Tina Turner; he left the group to embark on a solo career.

In 1994, Australian music veteran John Farnham invited him to play the guitar next to Stuart Fraser from Noiseworks for the Concert for Rwanda. Emmanuel had previously been a member of Farnham's band during the early 1980s and featured on the album Uncovered and rejoined after the 1994 concert.

In 1997, Emmanuel relocated from Australia to Nashville, Tennessee, following an invitation from his mentor and collaborator Chet Atkins. He continues to permanently reside in Nashville as a dual Australian and United States citizen.

In July 1999, Chet Atkins commented that Emmanuel was a "fearless" fingerpicking guitar player and awarded Tommy and four others (John Knowles, Jerry Reed, Marcel Dadi and Steve Wariner) the "Certified Guitar Player" title.

Emmanuel and his brother Phil performed live in Sydney at the closing ceremony of the Summer Olympics in 2000. The event was televised worldwide with an estimated 2.85 billion viewers.

In December 2007, he was diagnosed with heart problems and was forced to take a break from his hectic touring schedule due to exhaustion but returned to full-time touring in early 2008.

In June 2010, Emmanuel was appointed a Member of the Order of Australia (AM).

At the 2011 'TommyFest', Tommy took the chance to talk to the audience about his strong Christian faith. "The Lord is my shepherd, so I lack nothing—it's true!" he told the gathered crowds.

In 2012, Governor Steve Beshear awarded Emmanuel the state of Kentucky's honorific title of Kentucky Colonel.

In 2009 he worked with fellow local artists Ray Burgess, Marty Rhone, John St Peeters and John "Swanee" Swan to release a single, "Legends of the Southern Land".

During a July 2019 concert he mentioned recently receiving American citizenship.

In 2025, Emmanuel was awarded an honorary doctorate by the University of Newcastle for his contributions to music on a global scale.

== Guitar style ==
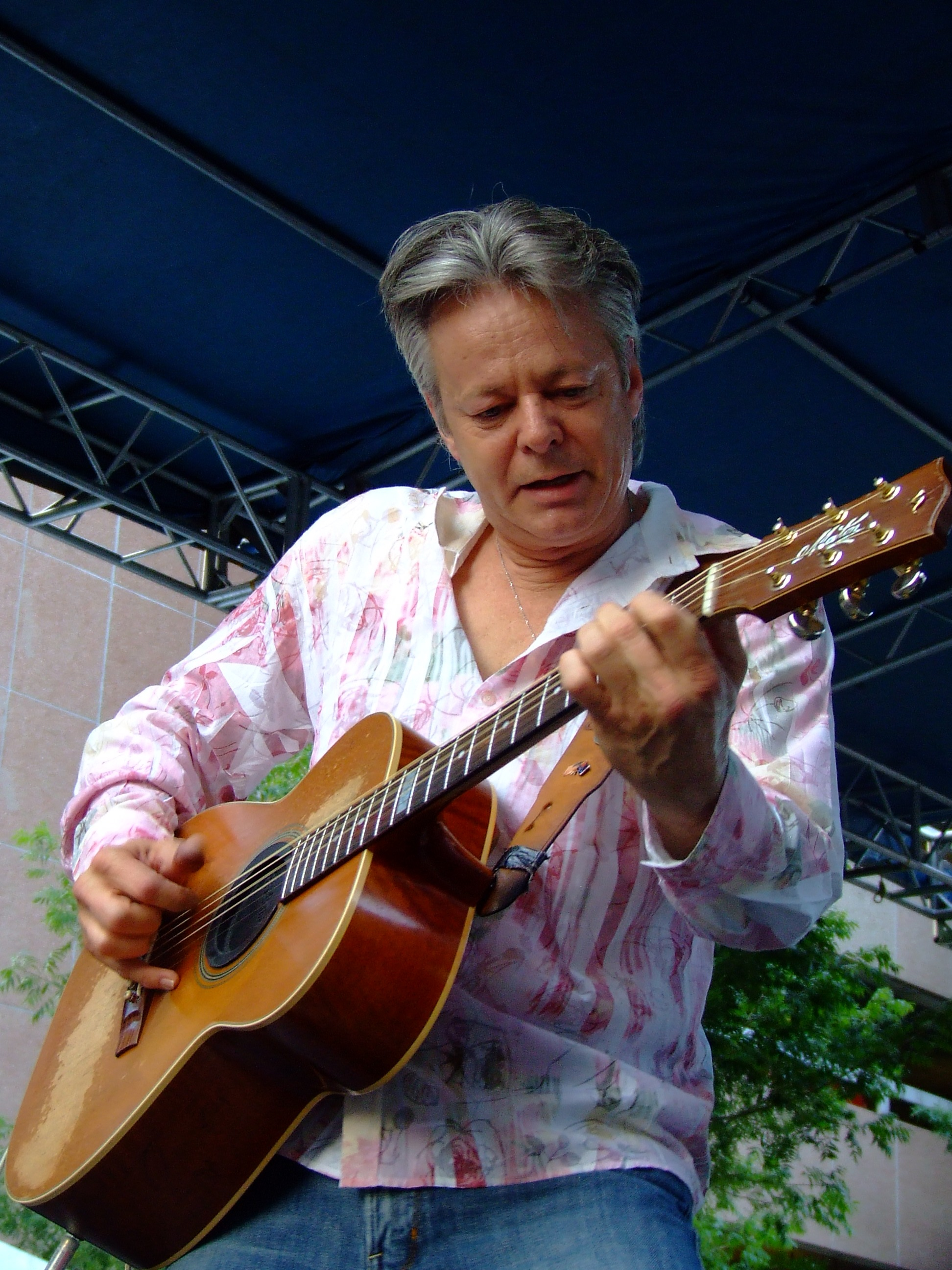
Emmanuel's fingerstyle technique was featured at a June 2006 performance at City Stages in Birmingham, Alabama

Emmanuel had said that even at a young age he was fascinated by Chet Atkins's musical style (sometimes referred to as Travis picking) of playing bass lines, chords, melodies, and harmonies simultaneously using the thumb and fingers of the right hand, achieving a dynamic range of sound from the instrument. Although Emmanuel's playing incorporates a multitude of musical influences and styles, including jazz, blues, bluegrass, folk and rock, this type of country finger-style playing is at the core of his technique. While Emmanuel has never had formal music training and cannot read or transcribe music, his natural musical ability, intrinsic sense of rhythm, and charisma gained him fans from all over the world. As a solo performer, he never plays to a setlist and uses a minimum of effects onstage. He usually completes studio recordings in one take.

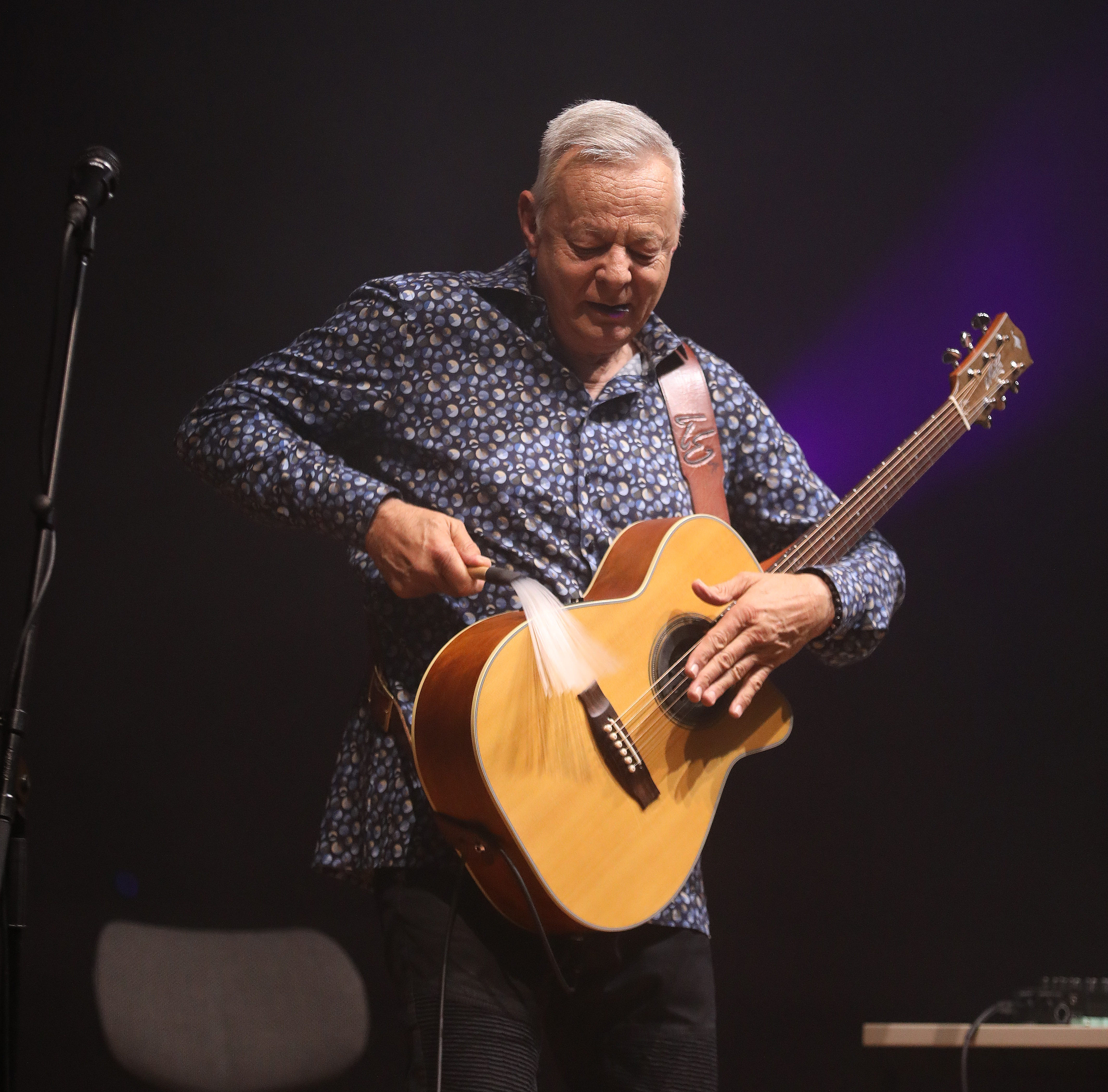
Emmanuel uses a snare-drum brush to emulate the sound of a percussion kit

In his solo shows, he mainly plays guitars made by Maton, an Australian guitar manufacturer. He usually travels with two custom Maton EBG808 TE models and one TE1 model, both of which are Tommy Emmanuel artist signature models. He has played Maton guitars for most of his career and is somewhat of an ambassador for the company due to his long-standing association with the brand. Emmanuel is known for the battered and worn-down appearances of his guitars; a result of his dynamic, energetic playing and percussive techniques. One of his signature performances, for example, involves striking the whole body of the guitar in various places with his hands or a drummer's snare-drum brush to emulate the sound of a percussion kit.

Emmanuel usually keeps one Maton EBG808 in standard guitar tuning (E-A-D-G-B-E), while he tunes his second Maton EBG808 to D-G-D-G-B-E (G6 tuning) and his TE1 to C♯-F♯-B-E-G♯-C♯. He generally uses 0.12 gauge (light) strings on one EBG808 and 0.13 gauge (medium) strings on the second Maton EBG808 and on the TE1. This allows him to quickly change tuning by swapping between guitars during a show if needed, rather than spending time onstage re-tuning one guitar.

Emmanuel often curls his left thumb around the neck of the guitar onto the fretboard to play some notes, rather than using only his fingers to play — contrary to how classical guitarists play, but not unusual for jazz and country guitarists. He frequently plays common three-finger chord shapes with just two fingers. He commonly uses a thumbpick, a flat pick (plectrum), his fingers, or a combination of these in his playing, a style known as hybrid picking. Amongst his trademark rapid virtuoso licks and cascading harmonic progressions, he often uses a technique that imitated an electric guitar's tremolo system on acoustic guitar — by pressing the palm of his right hand against the sound board of the guitar near the neck joint, while maintaining forward pressure with his left hand on the top of the headstock. The guitar neck slightly bends away from the body and consequently affects the pitch of the strings to achieve the desired sound.

== Influences ==
As a young man in Australia, Emmanuel wrote to his hero Chet Atkins in Nashville, Tennessee. Eventually, Atkins replied with words of encouragement and a long-standing invitation to drop by to visit.

In 1997, Emmanuel and Atkins recorded as a duo, releasing the album The Day Finger Pickers Took Over the World. It would be Atkins's last album, with the exception of "Solo Sessions" which Atkins' estate released posthumously. Emmanuel and Atkins appeared together on The Nashville Network's 'Country Christmas' in late 1997, and on that occasion, Atkins stated about him: "He is one of the greatest guitar players I've ever seen." Atkins gave Emmanuel the guitar on which Arthur "Guitar Boogie" Smith recorded "Guitar Boogie", one of the foundation performances of the blues guitar world and a regular feature of Emmanuel's shows.

In July 1999, at the 15th Annual Chet Atkins Appreciation Society Convention, Atkins presented Emmanuel with a Certified Guitar Player award, an honour Chet personally bestowed to only four guitarists. This award gains its fame from being bestowed by Atkins himself, a widely recognised leader in guitar music. The award states: "In Recognition of His Contributions to the Art of Fingerpicking." Tommy performed at the Chet Atkins Appreciation Society (CAAS) in July each year in Nashville.

In addition to being influenced by Chet Atkins, Emmanuel has stated that he and his brother Phil Emmanuel were inspired by and modelled themselves on Hank Marvin and Bruce Welch of the Shadows.

== Discography ==
- From Out of Nowhere (1979)
- Up from Down Under (1987)
- Dare to Be Different (1990)
- Determination (1991)
- The Journey (1993)
- Terra Firma (1994)
- Classical Gas (1995)
- Initiation (1995)
- Can't Get Enough (1996)
- Midnight Drive (1997)
- Collaboration (1998)
- Only (2000)
- Endless Road (2004)
- Live One (2005)
- The Mystery (2006)
- Happy Hour (2006)
- Center Stage (2008)
- Little by Little (2010)
- All I Want for Christmas (2011)
- Tommy Emmanuel & Friends Live from the Balboa Theatre (2011)
- The Colonel and the Governor (2013)
- It's Never Too Late (2015)
- Christmas Memories (2016)
- Live at the Ryman (2017)
- Pickin (2017)
- Accomplice One (2018)
- Heart Songs (2019)
- Accomplice Two (2023)
- Living in the Light (2025)

== Awards ==
=== APRA Awards ===
The APRA Awards (Australia) are annual awards to recognise composing and songwriting skills, sales, and airplay performance by its members annually.

Year	Category	Nominated work	Result
1992	Jazz Composition of the Year	"Stevie's Blues"	Won

=== ARIA Awards ===
The Australian Recording Industry Association Music Awards, commonly known as ARIA Music Awards, are held to recognise excellence and innovation and achievement across all genres of Australian music. Award nominees and winners, excluding for sales and public voted categories, are selected by the ARIA Academy comprising "judges from all sectors of the music industry–retail, radio and tv, journalists and critics, television presenters, concert promoters, agents, ARIA member record companies and past ARIA winners". The inaugural ARIA Awards took place in 1987.

Year	Category	Nominated work	Result
1989	Best Cover Art	"Up from Down Under"	Nominated
1991	Best Adult Contemporary Album	Dare to Be Different	Nominated
1992	Best Adult Contemporary Album	Determination	Won
1992	Best Male Artist	Determination	Nominated
1994	Best Adult Contemporary Album	The Journey	Won
1995	Best Adult Contemporary Album	Terra Firma	Nominated
1996	Best Adult Contemporary Album	Classical Gas	Nominated
1997	Best Adult Contemporary Album	Can't Get Enough	Nominated
2013	Best Jazz Album	The Colonel & The Governor	Nominated

=== Australian Roll of Renown ===
The Australian Roll of Renown honours Australian and New Zealand musicians who have shaped the music industry by making a significant and lasting contribution to Country Music. It was inaugurated in 1976 and the inductee is announced at the Country Music Awards of Australia in Tamworth in January.

Year	Nominee / work	Award	Result
2011	Tommy Emmanuel	Australian Country Music Roll of Renown	inductee

=== Country Music Awards of Australia ===
The Country Music Awards of Australia (CMAA) (also known as the Golden Guitar Awards) is an annual awards night held in January during the Tamworth Country Music Festival, celebrating recording excellence in the Australian country music industry. They have been held annually since 1973.

Year	Category	Nominated work	Result (wins only)
2005	Instrumental of the Year	"Tall Fiddler"	Won
2007	Instrumental of the Year	"Gameshow Rag/Cannonball Rag"	Won
2019	Instrumental of the Year	"Wheelin' and Dealin'"	Won
2021	Bluegrass Recording of the Year	"Finger Picking Good" (Kristy Cox feat Tommy Emmanuel)	Won

=== Grammy Awards ===
The Grammy Awards is an annual award presentation by The Recording Academy to recognise achievement in the mainly English-language music industry.

Year	Category	Nominated work	Result
1998	Best Country Instrumental Performance	"Smokey Mountain Lullaby"	Nominated
2006	Best Country Instrumental Performance	"Gameshow Rag/Cannonball Rag"	Nominated
2024	Best Arrangement, Instrumental or A Cappella	"Folsom Prison Blues"	Won

=== Mo Awards ===
The Australian Entertainment Mo Awards (commonly known informally as the Mo Awards), were annual Australian entertainment industry awards. They recognise achievements in live entertainment in Australia from 1975 to 2016. Tommy Emmanuel won two awards in that time.

Year	Nominee / work	Award	Result (wins only)
1994	Tommy Emmanuel	Australian Performer of the Year	Won
1996	Tommy Emmanuel	Australian Performer of the Year	Won

=== National Live Music Awards ===
The National Live Music Awards (NLMAs) are a broad recognition of Australia's diverse live industry, celebrating the success of the Australian live scene. The awards commenced in 2016.

Year	Nominee / work	Award	Result
2019	Rosie Fitzgerald (I Know Leopard)	Live Guitarist of the Year	Nominated

=== Lifetime Achievement Award ===
The National Guitar Museum nominated Emmanuel for its annual “Lifetime Achievement” Award in 2023.

== Bibliography ==
=== Contributor ===
- Emmanuel, Tommy (2007). "Contributor". Laugh Even Louder!. By Camp Quality. Gosford, New South Wales: Scholastic Australia Pty Limited. ISBN 978-1-74169-022-4.
