= Vika and Linda discography =

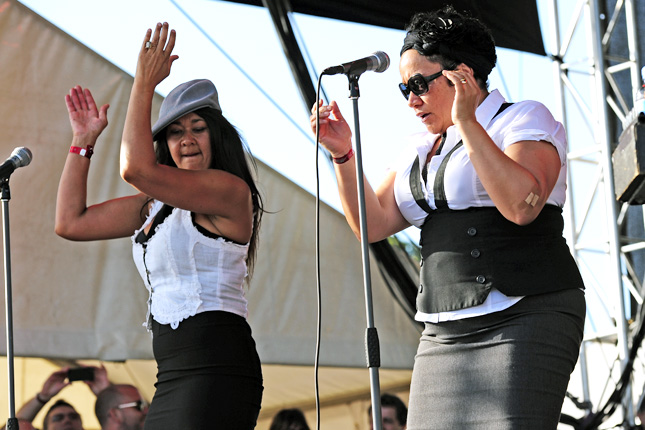
- Vika and Linda in 2011
- Studio albums: 9
- Live albums: 4
- Compilation albums: 2
- Singles: 24

Australian vocal duo Vika and Linda have released nine studio albums, two compilation albums, four live albums and twenty-four singles.

As for 2026, the duo have achieved four ARIA top 10 albums: Vika and Linda (1994), Akilotoa (Anthology 1994-2006) (2020), Sunday (The Gospel According to Iso) (2020) and The Wait (2021). Their ninth studio album, Where Do You Come From? peaked at number 11.

The duo have received several honours, including Hall of Fame inducted at Music Victoria Awards of 2019, Order of Australia at the 2022 Queen's Birthday Honours, Artistic Excellence Award at the 2023 Australian Women in Music Awards and ARIA Hall of Fame at the 2026 ARIA Music Awards.

== Albums ==
=== Studio albums ===
List of studio albums, with selected details, chart positions and certifications
Title	Album details	Peak chart positions		Certifications (sales thresholds)
Title	Album details	AUS	NZ	Certifications (sales thresholds)
Vika and Linda	Released: 6 June 1994; Label: Mushroom (RMD 53422, TVD 93422, MUSH32450.2); Formats: CD	7	16	ARIA: Platinum
Princess Tabu	Released: 30 July 1996; Label: Mushroom (TVD 93436, RMD 53436, MUSH33028.2); Formats: LP, MC	30	39	
Two Wings	Released: 16 August 1999; Label: Mushroom (RML53205, RMC53205, CD53205); Formats: CD	34	—	
Love Is Mighty Close	Released: July 2002; Label: Independent/MGM Distribution (VAL005); Formats: CD	—	—	
Between Two Shores	Released: 16 September 2006; Label: Liberation Blue (BLUE0932); Formats: CD; Note: acoustic album	—	—	
Sunday (The Gospel According to Iso)	Released: 11 September 2020; Label: Bloodlines (BLOOD78); Formats: CD, LP, streaming, digital download; Note: gospel album	2	—	
The Wait	Released: 17 September 2021; Label: Bloodlines (BLOOD93); Formats: CD, 2×CD, LP, streaming, digital download	2	—	
Gee Whiz, It's Christmas!	Released: 4 November 2022; Label: Bloodlines (BLOOD102); Formats: CD, CD, LP, streaming, digital download	42	—	
Where Do You Come From?	Released: 5 June 2026; Label: Mushroom (9341004148925); Formats: CD, LP, streaming, digital download	11	—	
"—" denotes a recording that did not chart or was not released in that territory.

=== Live albums ===
List of live albums, with selected details and chart positions
Title	Album details	Peak chart positions
Title	Album details	AUS
Live & Acoustic	Released: 6 November 2000; Label: Mushroom (MUSH332862); Formats: CD; Note: Recorded at The Continental in Melbourne	138
Tell the Angels	Released: 10 May 2004; Label: Independent/MGM Distribution (VAL007); Formats: CD; Note: Recorded at The Cornish Arms in Melbourne, June–August 2003	—
Vika & Linda: Live 2010	Released: 2010; Label: Independent; Formats: CD, DD; Note: Recorded in Melbourne, September 2010	—
Vika & Linda: Live 2011	Released: 2011; Label: Independent; Formats: CD, DD; Note: Recorded in Melbourne, February 2011	—
"—" denotes a recording that did not chart or was not released in that territory.

=== Soundtrack albums ===
List of soundtrack albums, with selected details and chart positions
Title	Album details	Peak chart positions
Title	Album details	AUS
Seven Deadly Sins (with Paul Kelly, Renée Geyer and Deborah Conway)	Released: February 1993; Label: Australian Broadcasting Corporation	71

=== Compilation albums ===
List of compilation albums, with selected details and chart positions
Title	Album details	Peak chart positions
Title	Album details	AUS
At the Mouth of the River	Released: 18 June 1996; Compilation album; Label: Real World; Formats: CD	—
'Akilotoa (Anthology 1994–2006)	Released: 12 June 2020; Greatest hits album; Label: Bloodlines; Formats: 2×CD, digital download, streaming	1

== Singles ==
Year	Title	Peak chart positions		Album
Year	Title	AUS	NZ	Album
1993	"He Can't Decide" (with Paul Kelly, Renee Geyer and Deborah Conway)	112	—	Seven Deadly Sins
1994	"When Will You Fall for Me"	51	—	Vika & Linda
1994	"House of Love"	98	32	Vika & Linda
1994	"Hard Love"	81	—	Vika & Linda
1995	"We've Started a Fire"/"I Know Where to Go to Feel Good"	134	—	Vika & Linda
1996	"Love Comes Easy"	93	—	Princess Tabu
1996	"The Parting Song"	146	—	Princess Tabu
1997	"Grandpa's Song"	—	—	Princess Tabu
1999	"Caution"	172	—	Two Wings
2015	"I Am Woman" (with Judith Lucy)	—	—	non album single
2020	"There Ain't No Grave (Gonna Hold My Body Down)"	—	—	Sunday (The Gospel According to Iso)
2020	"Strange Things Happening Every Day"	—	—	Sunday (The Gospel According to Iso)
2020	"It Don't Cost Very Much"	—	—	Sunday (The Gospel According to Iso)
2020	"Jesus on the Mainline"	—	—	Sunday (The Gospel According to Iso)
2020	"Memphis Flu"	—	—	Sunday (The Gospel According to Iso)
2020	"Acceptance" (with Davey Lane & Todd Rundgren)	—	—	Don’t Bank Your Heart On It
2021	"Raise Your Hand"	—	—	The Wait
2021	"My Heart Is In The Wrong Place"	—	—	The Wait
2021	"Like a Landslide"	—	—	The Wait
2021	"Lover Don't Keep Me Waiting"	—	—	The Wait
2023	"Heading in the Right Direction"	—	—	Mushroom: Fifty Years of Making Noise (Reimagined)
2026	"Where Do You Come From?"			Where Do You Come From?
2026	"That's How I Pray"			Where Do You Come From?
2026	"Bliss"			Where Do You Come From?
"—" denotes a recording that did not chart or was not released in that territory.

== Guest appearances ==
List of other non-single song appearances
Title	Year	Album
"Melbourne Girls" (Vika and Linda)	1993	Moon Over Melbourne
"Silent Night" (Vika and Linda)	1995	The Spirit of Christmas 1995
"Love Come Easy" (live) (Vika and Linda)	1998	Mushroom 25 Live
"The Bare Necessities" (Vika and Linda)	1999	Duets - A Family Celebration
"On the Front Porch" (Vika and Linda)	1999	Duets - A Family Celebration
"Feelin' Alright" (live) (Kate Ceberano, Vanessa Amorosi and Vika and Linda)	1999	True Romantic – The Best of Kate Ceberano
"The Gods Will Lift You" (Jimmy Little, Deborah Conway and Vika and Linda)	2000	Olympic Record
"Run Rudolph Run" (Vika and Linda)	2001	The Spirit of Christmas 2001
"Two Wings" (live) (Vika and Linda)	2004	A Day On the Green Live
"When You Fall For Me" (live) (Vika and Linda)	2004	A Day On the Green Live
"God's Little Birds" (live) (Vika and Linda)	2004	A Day On the Green Live
"Away in a Manger" (Vika and Linda)	2005	The Spirit of Christmas 2005
"Private Number" (Glenn Tilbrook with Linda)	2006	RocKwiz Duets
"If There's a Will, There's a Way" (Black Joe Lewis with Linda)	2012	RocKwiz Duets Volume IV: With a Little Help from My Friends
"Smells Like Rain" (Linda)	2014	The Merri Soul Sessions (with Paul Kelly)
"What You Want" (Vika)	2014	The Merri Soul Sessions (with Paul Kelly)
"Sweet Guy" (Vika)	2014	The Merri Soul Sessions (with Paul Kelly)
"Down on the Jetty" (Vika and Linda)	2014	The Merri Soul Sessions (with Paul Kelly)
"Hasn't It Rained" (Vika and Linda)	2014	The Merri Soul Sessions (with Paul Kelly)
"That’s a Pretty Good Love" (The Black Sorrows with Vika)	2015	Endless Sleep Chapter 46
"No Ordinary Man" (Kasey Chambers and Vika and Linda)	2017	Dragonfly
"My Man's Got a Cold" (Paul Kelly and Vika)	2017	Life is Fine
"Don't Explain" (Paul Kelly and Linda)	2017	Life is Fine
"(You Make Me Feel Like) A Natural Woman" (Vika)	2017	Beautiful: A Tribute to Carole King
"The Loco-Motion" (Vika and Linda)	2017	Beautiful: A Tribute to Carole King
"I Got the Blues"(Linda)	2018	Stoned! Celebrating the Music of The Rolling Stones.
"I'm on Your Side" (Archie Roach with Vika and Linda)	2019	The Concert Collection 2012–2018
"Solid Rock" (Shane Howard featuring Emma Donovan, Troy Cassar-Daley William Barton and Vika and Linda)	2020	Music from the Home Front
"Don't You Know Yockomo" (Denis Walter with Vika and Linda)	2021	Yesterday Once More
"Christmas (Baby, Please Come Home)" (Paul Kelly with Linda)	2021	Paul Kelly's Christmas Train
"Christmas Train" (Paul Kelly with Vika)	2021	Paul Kelly's Christmas Train
"Little Baby (acoustic)"	2026	Cradle Rock: Songs for Little Lives
