= 'Akilotoa =

ʻAkilotoa

Greatest hits album by Vika and Linda
- Released: 12 June 2020
- Recorded: 1994–2006, 2020
- Label: Bloodlines

Vika and Linda chronology
Vika & Linda: Live 2011 (2011)	ʻAkilotoa (2020)	Sunday (The Gospel According to Iso) (2020)

ʻAkilotoa (subtitled Anthology 1994–2006) is the first greatest hits album by Australian vocal duo, Vika and Linda. The album is a two-disc, 28-track collection spanning 12 years from 1994 to 2006 and includes songs from five studio albums Vika and Linda, Princess Tabu, Two Wings, Love Is Mighty Close and Between Two Shores as well as live albums Live and Acoustic and Tell the Angels, a re-recorded version of "Down by the Jetty" and "Never Let Me Go" by The Black Sorrows. The album debuted at number one on the ARIA Charts, earning the duo their first number one album. In doing so, they became the first Australian sister duo to top the ARIA Albums Chart.

== Background ==
The title references their family heritage from Tonga. Vika Bull said "The title is pronounced exactly as it reads [and] it has lots of different meaning in Tongan. It actually means 'cascading' in the Tongan dictionary." About the album's release, the duo said "It's like a little stepping stone before we go into the next part of our career. It was always on the back burner. We had productive years and then there's been a bit of a gap. Before we do a new record we want to acknowledge the past and then we can move on. We are proud of it."

== Release and promotion ==
To coincide with the release, Vika and Linda hosted a virtual album launch with a live performance and question and answer with Brian Nankervis, which was live-streamed on their Facebook page on 21 June 2020.

== Critical reception ==
Zoë Radas from Stack Magazine wrote: "The voices of Vika and Linda Bull have marinaded our ears in gorgeous sound waves for almost four decades" describing their sound as "unique, supple, and always bursting with spirit."

Kathy McCabe from PerthNow felt that "You forget just how many great songs they have until you run down the track list. Their regular appearances at festivals in the past decade coupled with their new social media fandom, has given their audience a generational refresh."

== Track listing ==
Disc one
No.	Title	Writer(s)	Album	Length
1.	"Hard Love"	Paul Kelly	Vika and Linda	4:41
2.	"When Will You Fall for Me"	Mark Seymour	Vika and Linda	3:47
3.	"House of Love"	Wayne Burt	Vika and Linda	4:12
4.	"We've Started a Fire"	Kelly	Vika and Linda	5:06
5.	"Sacred Things"	Joe Camilleri; Nick Smith	Vika and Linda	3:32
6.	"Ninety-Nine Years"	Vika and Linda Bull; Kelly	Vika and Linda	3:57
7.	"I Know Where to Go to Feel Good"	Kelly	Vika and Linda	5:03
8.	"The Blue Hour"	Chris Abrahams; Stephen Cummings	Vika and Linda	4:55
9.	"The Parting Song"	V. Bull; L. Bull; Kelly	Princess Tabu	4:01
10.	"Grandpa's Song"	V. Bull; L. Bull; Michael Barker	Princess Tabu	4:39
11.	"Princess Tabu"	V. Bull; L. Bull; Barker; Tim Finn	Princess Tabu	3:56
12.	"ʻAkilotoa"	Alecki; Sevesi	Princess Tabu	3:54
13.	"I'm On My Way"	V. Bull; L. Bull	Two Wings	4:54
14.	"Be Careful What You Pray For"	Kelly	Two Wings	3:33

Disc two
No.	Title	Writer(s)	Album	Length
1.	"God's Little Birds"	Ola Mae Terrell	Two Wings	2:41
2.	"Reach for You"	Archie Roach	Two Wings	3:02
3.	"If I Could Start Today Again"	Kelly	Two Wings	2:55
4.	"Feeling Good"	Anthony Newley; Leslie Bricusse	Two Wings	3:19
5.	"Two Wings" (live)	V. Bull; L. Bull	Live & Acoustic	3:22
6.	"Love is Mighty Close"	Jeff Burstin; Cummings	Love Is Mighty Close	4:08
7.	"To Be Good Takes a Long Time (To Be Bad No Time at All)"	Kelly	Love Is Mighty Close	2:41
8.	"Slow Train" (live)	Steve Cropper; William Bell	Tell the Angels	4:41
9.	"Who Rolled the Stone Away" (live)	V. Bull; L. Bull	Tell the Angels	3:21
10.	"Tell the Angels" (live)	W. Herbert Brewster	Tell the Angels	4:34
11.	"Holy Waters" (acoustic)	Cyndi Boste	Between Two Shores	5:19
12.	"Love Comes Easy" (acoustic)	V. Bull; L. Bull; Barry Palmer	Between Two Shores	3:29
13.	"Down on the Jetty"	L. Bull; Kelly	rerecorded in 2020, originally on The Merri Soul Sessions	3:08
14.	"Never Let Me Go" (The Black Sorrows) (CD bonus track)	Camilleri; Smith	Harley and Rose	4:03

== Charts ==
Chart performance for ʻAkilotoa
Chart (2020)	Peak position
Australian Albums (ARIA)	1

== Release history ==
Region	Date	Format	Label	Catalogue
Australia	12 June 2020	2×CD; streaming; digital download	Bloodlines	BLOOD73

== See also ==
- List of number-one albums of 2020 (Australia)
