= List of top 10 albums for 2020 in Australia =

This is a list of albums that charted in the top ten of the ARIA Album Charts, an all-genre albums chart, in 2020.

== Top-ten albums ==
The list is sorted chronologically by issue date with the date representing the first issue in which the album appeared in the top ten in 2020, regardless of whether an album charted in a previous year or not. Dates reached peak position are in 2020 unless otherwise noted.

An asterisk (*) represents that an album is still in the top-ten as of the issue dated 7 December 2020.

List of ARIA top-ten albums in 2020
Issue Date	Album		Peak		Weeks in the top 10	
Issue Date	Title	Artist(s)	Position	Date	In 2020	Overall
6 January	Fine Line	Harry Styles	1	23 December 2019	44*	46*
6 January	When We All Fall Asleep, Where Do We Go?	Billie Eilish	1	8 April 2019	35	72
6 January	Frozen II	Various artists	2	9 December 2019	5	9
6 January	No.6 Collaborations Project	Ed Sheeran	1	22 July 2019	9	34
6 January	JackBoys	JackBoys and Travis Scott	5	6 January	1	1
6 January	Hollywood's Bleeding	Post Malone	1	16 September 2019	21	35
6 January	The Kids Are Coming	Tones and I	3	9 September 2019	3	20
6 January	Lover	Taylor Swift	1	2 September 2019	6	21
6 January	Diamonds	Elton John	3	10 June 2019	16	33
6 January	Songs from the South: 1985–2019	Paul Kelly	1	25 November 2019	1	7
13 January	Divinely Uninspired to a Hellish Extent	Lewis Capaldi	7	13 January	2	3
13 January	What You See Is What You Get	Luke Combs	1	18 November 2019	9	12
20 January	Rare	Selena Gomez	1	20 January	2	2
20 January	Live in Adelaide '19	King Gizzard & the Lizard Wizard	6	20 January	1	1
20 January	Live in Paris '19	King Gizzard & the Lizard Wizard	9	20 January	1	1
20 January	Blood Moon	Cold Chisel	1	16 December 2019	1	4
27 January	Music to Be Murdered By	Eminem	1	27 January	8	8
27 January	Manic	Halsey	2	27 January	3	3
27 January	Circles	Mac Miller	3	27 January	1	1
3 February	Hotspot	Pet Shop Boys	8	3 February	1	1
10 February	Hurry Up and Wait	Dune Rats	1	10 February	1	1
10 February	The Octagon	Chillinit	2	10 February	1	1
10 February	Walls	Louis Tomlinson	6	10 February	1	1
17 February	Father of All Motherfuckers	Green Day	1	17 February	1	1
17 February	Love	Michael Bublé	2	19 November 2018	1	6
17 February	Birds of Prey	Various artists	9	17 February	1	1
24 February	The Slow Rush	Tame Impala	1	24 February	4	4
24 February	Changes	Justin Bieber	2	24 February	7	7
24 February	Bohemian Rhapsody	Queen	1	7 January 2019	1	33
2 March	Map of the Soul: 7	BTS	1	2 March	4	4
2 March	Everyone Loves You... Once You Leave Them	The Amity Affliction	2	2 March	1	1
2 March	The Death of Me	Polaris	3	2 March	1	1
2 March	Ordinary Man	Ozzy Osbourne	4	2 March	1	1
2 March	Miss Anthropocene	Grimes	10	2 March	1	1
9 March	F8	Five Finger Death Punch	2	9 March	1	1
9 March	Race Car Blues	Slowly Slowly	7	9 March	1	1
16 March	Eternal Atake	Lil Uzi Vert	1	16 March	2	2
16 March	How I'm Feeling	Lauv	5	16 March	1	1
23 March	Artists Unite For Fire Fight	Various artists	1	23 March	9	9
23 March	Heartbreak Weather	Niall Horan	2	23 March	2	2
23 March	Speed Of Life	Adam Brand	6	23 March	1	1
23 March	Flip Phone Fantasy	Ocean Grove	8	23 March	1	1
23 March	Fallow	Fanny Lumsden	10	23 March	1	1
30 March	After Hours	The Weeknd	1	30 March	13	13
30 March	Live at the Triffid	The Smith Street Band	4	30 March	1	1
30 March	Velvet	Adam Lambert	8	30 March	1	1
30 March	All the Hits and All New Love Songs	Kenny Rogers	10	30 March	1	1
6 April	Calm	5 Seconds of Summer	1	6 April	5	5
6 April	Future Nostalgia	Dua Lipa	1	20 April	13	13
6 April	Gigaton	Pearl Jam	3	6 April	2	2
6 April	High Risk Behaviour	The Chats	5	6 April	1	1
6 April	ADHD	Joyner Lucas	9	6 April	1	1
13 April	Everything Is A-OK	Violent Soho	1	13 April	1	1
13 April	Roll the Dice	Kerser	3	13 April	1	1
20 April	Human. :II: Nature.	Nightwish	7	20 April	1	1
20 April	The New Toronto 3	Tory Lanez	10	20 April	1	1
27 April	Don't Waste Your Anger	The Smith Street Band	7	27 April	1	1
27 April	Blame It on Baby	DaBaby	7	27 April	1	1
4 May	Human Design	Birds of Tokyo	1	4 May	3	3
4 May	What the Dead Men Say	Trivium	7	4 May	1	1
4 May	Astroworld	Travis Scott	1	13 August 2018	1	5
11 May	Dark Lane Demo Tapes	Drake	1	11 May	3	3
18 May	Petals for Armor	Hayley Williams	6	18 May	1	1
18 May	6 to the World	HP Boyz	7	18 May	1	1
25 May	Live at the Forum	The Teskey Brothers	1	25 May	1	1
25 May	This One's for You	Luke Combs	7	12 June 2017	1	2
25 May	The Goat	Polo G	10	25 May	1	1
1 June	Notes on a Conditional Form	The 1975	1	1 June	1	1
1 June	D-2	Agust D	2	1 June	1	1
1 June	Dissimulation	KSI	4	1 June	1	1
8 June	Chromatica	Lady Gaga	1	8 June	6	6
8 June	Wild World	Kip Moore	4	8 June	1	1
8 June	East	Cold Chisel	2	12 June 1980	1	5
8 June	Golden Hour	Kygo	8	8 June	1	1
15 June	Sideways to New Italy	Rolling Blackouts Coastal Fever	4	15 June	1	1
15 June	The Ghost Inside	The Ghost Inside	5	15 June	1	1
22 June	'Akilotoa (Anthology 1994-2006)	Vika and Linda	1	22 June	2	2
22 June	Sunlight	Spacey Jane	2	22 June	2	2
22 June	Mayhem to Madness	The McClymonts	3	22 June	1	1
29 June	Music from the Home Front	Various artists	1	29 June	7	7
29 June	Rough and Rowdy Ways	Bob Dylan	2	29 June	3	3
29 June	Lonely Diamond	Ocean Alley	3	29 June	2	2
29 June	Lamb of God	Lamb of God	5	29 June	1	1
6 July	Mordechai	Khruangbin	4	6 July	1	1
6 July	Women in Music Pt. III	HAIM	7	6 July	1	1
13 July	Shoot for the Stars, Aim for the Moon	Pop Smoke	1	13 July	17	17
13 July	Chunky Shrapnel	King Gizzard & the Lizard Wizard	2	13 July	1	1
13 July	Hamilton - An American Musical	Cast of Hamilton	6	20 July	5	5
20 July	14 Steps to a Better You	Lime Cordiale	1	20 July	2	2
20 July	The Glow	DMA's	2	20 July	2	2
20 July	Legends Never Die	Juice Wrld	1	27 July	14	14
27 July	Gaslighter	The Chicks	2	27 July	2	2
27 July	Map of the Soul: 7 – The Journey	BTS	9	27 July	1	1
3 August	Folklore	Taylor Swift	1	3 August	15*	15*
3 August	Like Nirvana	Cub Sport	2	3 August	1	1
3 August	F*ck Love	The Kid Laroi	3	3 August	8*	8*
3 August	Twenty Twenty	Ronan Keating	9	3 August	2	2
10 August	Brain Candy	Hockey Dad	2	10 August	1	1
10 August	Please Leave Your Light On	Paul Kelly & Paul Grabowsky	3	10 August	2	2
10 August	Wreck Me	Travis Collins	8	10 August	1	1
10 August	Such Pretty Forks in the Road	Alanis Morissette	10	10 August	1	1
17 August	Born Here Live Here Die Here	Luke Bryan	2	17 August	1	1
17 August	Kaliyuga	In Hearts Wake	3	17 August	1	1
17 August	Dreamland	Glass Animals	6	17 August	1	1
24 August	Blonde on the Tracks	Emma Swift	9	24 August	1	1
31 August	Imploding the Mirage	The Killers	1	31 August	1	1
31 August	In a Dream	Troye Sivan	3	31 August	2*	2*
31 August	Cannot Buy My Soul: The Songs of Kev Carmody	Various artists	6	31 August	1	1
31 August	Living in Sin	Hooligan Hefs	9	31 August	1	1
31 August	Here on Earth	Tim McGraw	10	31 August	1	1
7 September	S&M2	Metallica & San Francisco Symphony	1	7 September	1	1
7 September	Smile	Katy Perry	2	7 September	4	4
7 September	Rome	Josh Pyke	8	7 September	1	1
7 September	Whose Line Is It Anyway?	Private Function	9	7 September	1	1
7 September	Sunset Suburbia	Diesel	10	7 September	1	1
14 September	Odyssey Number Five	Powderfinger	1	11 September 2000	3	15
14 September	Between You and Me	San Cisco	3	14 September	1	1
14 September	Slim and I	Slim Dusty	8	14 September	1	1
14 September	Spiralling	Wil Wagner	9	14 September	1	1
21 September	We Are Chaos	Marilyn Manson	1	21 September	1	1
21 September	Sunday (The Gospel According to Iso)	Vika and Linda	2	21 September	1	1
28 September	The Speed of Now: Part 1	Keith Urban	1	28 September	6	6
28 September	Heaven & Hell	Ava Max	7	28 September	1	1
28 September	Automatic	Mildlife	8	28 September	1	1
5 October	Nectar	Joji	1	5 October	1	1
5 October	Tickets to My Downfall	Machine Gun Kelly	2	5 October	3	3
5 October	Ohms	Deftones	3	5 October	1	1
5 October	A Quiet Place to Die	Alpha Wolf	6	5 October	1	1
5 October	Ultra Mono	Idles	7	5 October	1	1
12 October	Live Around the World	Queen & Adam Lambert	1	12 October	3	3
12 October	The Album	Blackpink	2	12 October	3	3
12 October	2020	Bon Jovi	3	12 October	1	1
12 October	Savage Mode II	21 Savage & Metro Boomin	4	12 October	1	1
12 October	CMFT	Corey Taylor	8	12 October	1	1
19 October	Hybrid Theory	Linkin Park	1	19 October	1	9
19 October	Full Circle	Chillinit	3	19 October	1	1
26 October	T.R.U.T.H.	Guy Sebastian	1	26 October	7*	7*
26 October	50 Push Ups for a Dollar	Skegss	4	26 October	1	1
26 October	Rumours	Fleetwood Mac	1	4 February 1977	1	46
2 November	Letter to You	Bruce Springsteen	1	2 November	4	4
2 November	Ball Park Music	Ball Park Music	2	2 November	1	1
2 November	Song Machine, Season One: Strange Timez	Gorillaz	5	2 November	1	1
2 November	Moral Panic	Nothing but Thieves	8	2 November	1	1
9 November	The Makarrata Project	Midnight Oil	1	9 November	2	2
9 November	Positions	Ariana Grande	2	9 November	5*	5*
9 November	Love Goes	Sam Smith	3	9 November	2	2
9 November	The Raging Wrath of the Easter Bunny Demo	Mr. Bungle	6	9 November	1	1
9 November	Post Human: Survival Horror	Bring Me the Horizon	7	9 November	1	1
9 November	Panic Force	Triple One	8	9 November	1	1
9 November	Child in Reverse	Kate Miller-Heidke	9	9 November	1	1
16 November	Disco	Kylie Minogue	1	16 November	2	2
16 November	Confetti	Little Mix	7	16 November	1	1
23 November	Power Up	AC/DC	1	23 November	3*	3*
23 November	Only Santa Knows	Delta Goodrem	5	23 November	1	1
23 November	Against All Odds	Onefour	7	23 November	1	1
23 November	Push the Blues Away	Josh Teskey & Ash Grunwald	8	23 November	1	1
23 November	Jolly Holiday	André Rieu	10	23 November	1	1
30 November	Be	BTS	2	30 November	2*	2*
30 November	Apart Together	Tim Minchin	3	30 November	1	1
30 November	The Modern Medieval	Something For Kate	4	30 November	1	1
30 November	Idiot Prayer	Nick Cave and the Bad Seeds	5	30 November	1	1
7 December	Unreleased (1998–2010)	Powderfinger	2	7 December	1*	1*
7 December	Plastic Hearts	Miley Cyrus	3	7 December	1*	1*
7 December	Believe	Andrea Bocelli	10	7 December	1*	1*

== Entries by artist ==
The following table shows artists who achieved two or more top 10 entries in 2020.

Entries	Artist	Country of origin	Weeks	Albums
3	BTS	KOR	7	"Map of the Soul: 7", "Map of the Soul: 7 - The Journey", "Be"
3	King Gizzard & the Lizard Wizard	AUS	3	"Live in Adelaide '19", "Live in Paris '19", "Chunky Shrapnel"
2	Taylor Swift	US	21	"Lover", "Folklore"
2	Luke Combs	US	10	"What You See Is What You Get", "This One's for You"
2	Powderfinger	AUS	4	"Odyssey Number Five", "Unreleased (1998–2010)"
2	Paul Kelly	AUS	3	"Songs from the South: 1985–2019", "Please Leave Your Light On"
2	Vika and Linda	AUS	3	"'Akilotoa", "Sunday (The Gospel According to Iso)"
2	Travis Scott	US	2	"JackBoys", "Astroworld"
2	The Smith Street Band	AUS	2	"Live at the Triffid", "Don't Waste Your Anger"
2	Cold Chisel	AUS	2	"Blood Moon", "East"
2	Chillinit	AUS	2	"The Octagon", "Full Circle"

== See also ==
- 2020 in music
- ARIA Charts
- List of number-one albums of 2020 (Australia)
- List of top 10 singles in 2020 (Australia)
