= Whitsundays Songwriter Festival =

The Whitsundays Songwriter Festival (WSF) is a celebration of songs, stories and creative community on Ngaro and Gia land in North Queensland.

Each year a group of acclaimed songwriters participate in a creative Residency, developing new original work celebrating the art of songwriting. The festival's Songwriting Summit invites local and visiting songwriters for inspiration and mentorship by the resident artists with masterclasses, workshops and a showcase. A Concert & Conversation is performed by the professional songwriters revealing the stories of songs written during the residency.

Co-Founded by Queensland professional songwriters Karen Jacobsen and Francesca de Valence, past invited professional songwriters include Vika and Linda Toni Childs Wendy Matthews Christine Anu Tania Doko (Bachelor Girl) Graeme Connors Jude York Brad Butcher Tia Gostelow and Mark Sholtez.

Songs written in the professional songwriter residency have been recorded and performed, including the songs That's How I Pray, Little Baby and I Hit Pause released on Vika & Linda's album Where Do You Come From? which debuted at number one on the Australian Album charts and My Wandjina Boy performed by Zipporah Corser-Anu on the SBS Australia television show Generations and at the Sydney Opera House.

WSF was nominated for Festival of the Year in the Queensland Music Awards in 2024 and 2025.

The Whitsundays Songwriter Festival was established in 2022 under the auspice of the Whitsundays Arts Festival.
