= The Wait (Vika and Linda album) =

Studio album by Vika and Linda
- Released: 17 September 2021
- Recorded: April 2021
- Studio: Woodstock Studios
- Length: 44:32
- Label: Bloodlines Music
- Producer: Lisa Palermo, Cameron Bruce, Steven Schram, Vika and Linda Bull

Vika and Linda chronology
Sunday (The Gospel According to Iso) (2020)	The Wait (2021)	Gee Whiz, It's Christmas! (2022)

Singles from The Wait
- 1. "Raise Your Hand" Released: 1 July 2021; 2. "My Heart Is in the Wrong Place" Released: 1 July 2021; 3. "Like a Landslide" Released: 10 August 2021; 4. "Lover Don't Keep Me Waiting" Released: 10 August 2021

The Wait is the seventh studio album by Australia vocal duo Vika and Linda Bull, released on 17 September 2021. It is their first album of original music since Love Is Mighty Close in 2002. In a statement, Linda Bull said "It took us three times to make this record, it kept getting delayed and we've been waiting 19 years to make this record... waiting for more songs. Waiting for the right opportunity."

At the 2022 ARIA Music Awards, the album was nominated for Best Adult Contemporary Album.

== Singles ==
- "Raise Your Hand" was released on 1 July 2021, and is "a fan favourite at live shows". Linda Bull says,"As soon as we sing 'Raise Your Hand', the hands go up in the crowd." With all that’s going on at the moment, this song is relevant in so many ways. It's anthemic, "raise your hand, speak up, say what you want, don't be ignored."
- "My Heart Is in the Wrong Place" was also released on 1 July 2021. Vika Bull said "[it] is one of those songs that everyone can relate to. Sometimes you feel like giving up, but something in you just makes you keep pushing through."
- "Like a Landslide" was released on 10 August 10, as the album's third running single. The duo took to Facebook to say "'Like a Landslide' is about being on the road when you can't wait to get home and be with your loved one again."
- "Lover Don't Keep Me Waiting" was released on 10 September 2021, as the album's fourth single, with the duo saying: "We love the lyric in this song 'You better make your move before I go and change my mind'."

== Reception ==
Jeff Jenkins from Stack called The Wait "the album of the year", writing: "This is the sound of two women taking control of their careers and refusing to play it safe... The result is as close to perfect as any record you'll ever hear."

== Track listing ==
The Wait track listing
No.	Title	Writer(s)	Length
1.	"Raise Your Hand"	Kasey Chambers; Brandon Dodd	4:16
2.	"Like a Landslide"	Bernard Fanning	3:54
3.	"Teeth"	Eva Seymour	3:13
4.	"My Heart Is in the Wrong Place"	Ben Salter	4:48
5.	"Not the Same Girl"	Glenn Richards	3:20
6.	"Since You're Gone"	Matt Walker; Neil Murray	3:34
7.	"Pigface and Calendula"	Richards	3:31
8.	"I Miss You in the Night"	Don Walker	2:55
9.	"Lover Don't Keep Me Waiting"	Chris Cheney	3:39
10.	"Hand Grenade"	Jemma Rowlands; Mick Thomas	4:09
11.	"Rabbit Hole"	Brandon Dodd; Kasey Chambers	3:24
12.	"The Long View"	Paul Kelly	3:49
Total length:			44:32

Deluxe bonus disc (live) recorded 7 March 2021, live at Sidney Myer Music Bowl
No.	Title	Writer(s)	Length
1.	"Strange Things Happening Every Day"	Sister Rosetta Tharpe
2.	"Be Careful What You Pray for"	Paul Kelly
3.	"Grandpa's Song"	Michael Barker; Linda Bull; Vika BUll
4.	"The Blue Hour"	Chris Abrahams; Stephen Cummings
5.	"Never Let Me Go"	Joe Camilleri; Nick Smith
6.	"Reach for You"	Archie Roach
7.	"When Will You Fall for Me"	Mark Seymour
8.	"Down On the Jetty"	L. Bull; Kelly
9.	"Bridge Over Troubled Water"	Paul Simon
10.	"Feeling Good"	Anthony Newley; Leslie Bricusse

== Charts ==
Chart performance for The Wait
Chart (2021)	Peak position
Australian Albums (ARIA)	2

== Release history ==
Release history and formats for The Wait
Region	Date	Format	Label	Catalogue	Ref.
Various	17 September 2021	LP; CD; streaming; digital download	Bloodlines	BLOOD93	
Australia	17 September 2021	2×CD deluxe	Bloodlines	BLOODLP93X	
Australia	17 September 2021	LP	Bloodlines	BLOODLP93	
