= Ceres (band) =

Australian rock band

- Origin: Melbourne, Australia
- Genres: Indie rock, indie pop
- Years active: 2012–2020, 2024–present
- Labels: Hobbledehoy, Cooking Vinyl Australia
- Spinoffs: Limbs May Fall
- Members: Tom Lanyon; Sean Callanan; Grant Young; Frank Morda; Stacey Cicivelli
- Past members: Rhys Vleugel

Ceres are an Australian rock band, formed in 2012 in Melbourne, Victoria, and signed to record label Cooking Vinyl Australia. The band released their debut studio album, I Don't Want To Be Anywhere But Here in 2014 and released a further two studio albums prior to their 2020 split. The band reunited in 2024.

== History ==
=== 2012–2015: Early years and I Don't Want To Be Anywhere But Here ===
Ceres formed in mid-2012 and recorded and released the EP Luck in February 2013. This garnered them enough interest to secure a spot on the Melbourne leg of the 2014 Soundwave Festival. A couple of months later, in April 2014, the band released their debut studio album, I Don't Want to Be Anywhere But Here which brought the band their first airplay on national radio station Triple J.

=== 2016–2018: Drag it Down on You ===
Over the next two years, the band worked on their second studio album. In September 2016, the band's second album, Drag it Down on You, was released. It was produced by Los Campesinos! frontman Tom Bromley, and featured the singles "Happy in Your Head", "Laundry Echo", "91, Your House" and "Choke". The album was the band's last with original lead guitarist Rhys Vleugel, who announced his departure from Ceres shortly before its release. He was replaced by Sean Callinan in the band's line-up.

In 2017, the band released two stand-alone collaborative singles: "Stretch Ur Skin", with guest vocals from The Smith Street Band's Wil Wagner, and "Loner Blood", featuring Melbourne electronic producer Japanese Wallpaper.

=== 2019–2023: We Are a Team and hiatus ===
Ceres released their third album, We Are a Team, in April 2019. It became the band's first charting album, debuting at number 55 on the ARIA Charts. The album was preceded by the release of three singles: "Viv in the Front Seat", "Kiss Me Crying" and "Me & You" Following the album's release, keyboardist and rhythm guitarist Stacey Cicivelli from the Melbourne band Self Talk was announced as an official member of the band. Ceres drummer Frank Morda is Cicivelli's husband, and also played in Self Talk.

In December 2019, the band's final show before an unannounced hiatus took place at Nighthawks in Melbourne. In May 2023, Tom Lanyon made a guest appearance during Slowly Slowly’s concert at the Forum Theatre in Melbourne, marking his first time performing on-stage in nearly three years.

=== 2024–present: Reunion and Magic Mountain (1996—2022) ===
In May 2024, Ceres announced their return and released the single "Want/Need" with an accompanying music video. In June 2024, a further two singles "Humming" and "MAXi" were released. In August 2024, the group released the singles “Britney Spears” and "In the Valley" and announced the forthcoming release of their fourth studio album, Magic Mountain (1996—2022). The band also toured the Australian east coast tour in support of the singles. The album was released on October 4, 2024.

Following an Australian tour in 2025, the band announced a new screamo side project dubbed Limbs May Fall. The band features Lanyon on lead vocals, Grant Young on bass and former guitarist Vleugel on guitar, as well as drummer Joel Taylor. Their self-titled debut album was released on November 28, 2025, via Hobbeldehoy Record Co.

== Band members ==
Current members

- Tom Lanyon – lead vocals, rhythm guitar (2012–2020, 2024–present)
- Grant Young – bass (2012–2020, 2024–present)
- Frank Morda – drums (2012–2020, 2024–present)
- Sean Callanan – lead guitar, backing vocals (2016–2020, 2024–present)
- Stacey Cicivelli – rhythm guitar, keyboards, backing vocals (2019–2020, 2024–present)

Former members

- Rhys Vleugel – lead guitar, backing vocals (2012–2016)

== Discography ==
=== Albums ===
List of studio albums, with selected chart positions
Title	Details	Peak chart positions
Title	Details	AUS
I Don't Want To Be Anywhere But Here	Released: April 2014; Label: Ceres, Hobbledehoy (HOB030); Format: LP, CD, digital download	-
Drag it Down on You	Released: 2 September 2016; Label: Cooking Vinyl Australia (CVLP058); Format: LP, CD, digital download	-
We Are a Team	Released: 6 April 2019; Label: Ceres, Cooking Vinyl Australia (CVLP086); Format: LP, CD, digital download, streaming	55
Magic Mountain (1996—2022)	Released: 4 October 2024; Label: Ceres, Cooking Vinyl Australia (CVLP150); Format: LP, CD, digital download, streaming	(Note: Magic Mountain (1996—2022) did not enter the ARIA top 100, but peaked at number 14 on the Australian Artist Chart)

=== EPs ===
List of extended plays
Title	Album details
Luck	Released: 16 February 2013; Label: Ceres, Hobbledehoy (HOB028); Format: CD, 12" LP re-issue, digital download
Selfish Prick	Released: 14 November 2014; Label: Hobbledehoy (HOB033); Format: 7" LP (limited to 500 copies)
Stretch Ur Skin	Released: 27 May 2017; Label: Cooking Vinyl Australia (CVLP070); Format: 7" LP (limited edition), digital download

=== Singles ===
List of singles as lead artist
Title	Year	Album
"Syllables"	2014	I Don't Want to Be Anywhere But Here
"Collarbone"	2014	Selfish Prick
"Ceres is for Lovers"	2015	Non-album single
"Happy In Your Head"	2016	Drag It Down On You
"Laundry Echo"	2016	Drag It Down On You
"Choke"	2016	Drag It Down On You
"'91, Your House"	2017	Drag It Down On You
"Stretch Ur Skin" (featuring Wil Wagner)	2017	Non-album singles
"Loner Blood" (featuring Japanese Wallpaper)	2017	Non-album singles
"Viv in the Front Seat"	2018	We Are a Team
"Kiss Me Crying"	2018	We Are a Team
"Me & You"	2019	We Are a Team
"Want/Need"	2024	Magic Mountain (1996—2022)
"Humming"	2024	Magic Mountain (1996—2022)
"Maxi"	2024	Magic Mountain (1996—2022)
"Britney Spears"	2024	Magic Mountain (1996—2022)
"In the Valley"	2024	Magic Mountain (1996—2022)

== Awards and nominations ==
=== J Award ===
The J Awards are an annual series of Australian music awards that were established by the Australian Broadcasting Corporation's youth-focused radio station Triple J. They commenced in 2005.

Year	Nominee / work	Award	Result
J Awards of 2014	themselves	Unearthed Artist of the Year	Nominated

=== Music Victoria Awards ===
The Music Victoria Awards (previously known as The Age EG Awards and The Age Music Victoria Awards) are an annual awards night celebrating Victorian music.

Year	Nominee / work	Award	Result	Ref.
Music Victoria Awards of 2014	I Don't Want to Be Anywhere But Here	Best Heavy Album	Nominated	

=== National Live Music Awards ===
The National Live Music Awards (NLMAs) are a broad recognition of Australia's diverse live industry, celebrating the success of the Australian live scene. The awards commenced in 2016.

Year	Nominee / work	Award	Result
National Live Music Awards of 2020	Ceres	Victorian Live Act of the Year	Won
