= Didn't It Rain =

Song performed by Mahalia Jackson

"Didn't It Rain", sometimes given as "Oh, Didn't It Rain", is a spiritual about Noah's flood. In 1919 it appeared as sheet music in an arrangement for voice and piano by Henry Thacker Burleigh (1866–1949).

== Modern versions ==
- The Galilee Singers (1923-1929?)
- The Golden Gate Quartet (1938)
- Sister Rosetta Tharpe (1948)
- Mahalia Jackson (1955)
- LaVern Baker (1959)
- Fern Jones (1959)
- Dave van Ronk (1964)
- Joe & Eddie (1964)
- Marion Williams (1967)
- Evelyn Freeman Roberts (1962)
- The Band (1973)
- Rev. James Cleveland (1982)
- Tom Jones (2010)
- Johnny Cash (2012)
- Hugh Laurie (2013)
- Amy Helm (2015)
- Glen David Andrews (2014)
- In 2020, Vika and Linda cover the song for their album, Sunday (The Gospel According to Iso).
- Jake Blount reworks the song for his album "The New Faith" (2022)
- Joelly Group the song "Oh, Didn't It Rain" (2025)
