= Glory Road (disambiguation) =

Glory Road is a 1963 fantasy novel by Robert A. Heinlein.

Glory Road may also refer to:

- Glory Road (film), 2006 movie about the 1966 Texas Western College Miners basketball team
- Glory Road (Richard Clapton album), 1987
- Glory Road (Gillan album), 1980
- Glory Road, 1952 American Civil War history by Bruce Catton, second of his Army of the Potomac trilogy
- The Glory Road, a 2005 posthumous album by Fern Jones
