= Karen Jacobsen =

Australian singer, Siri voice

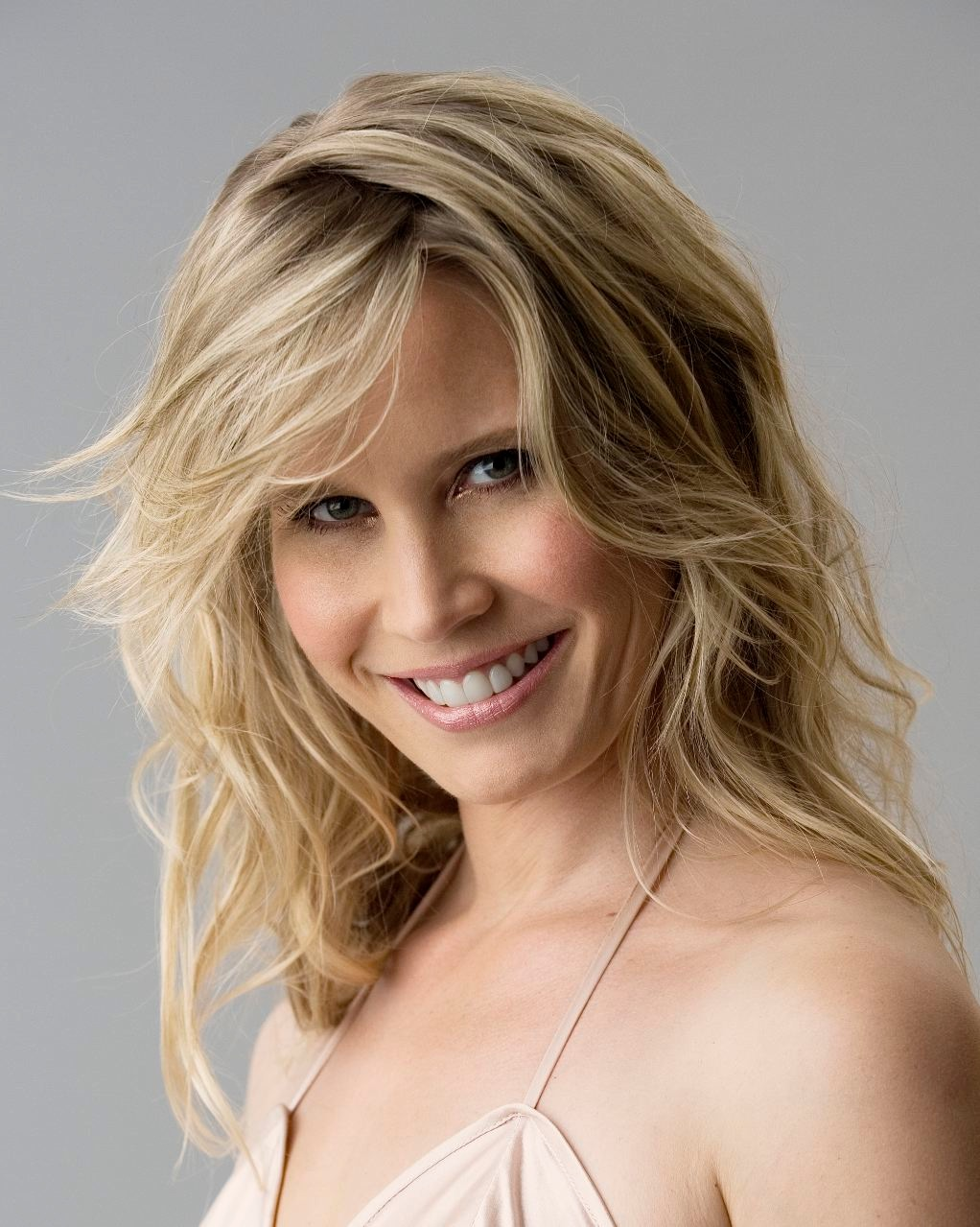
- Born: Karen Jacobsen; Mackay, Queensland, Australia
- Occupations: Entertainer; singer; motivational speaker; voice over artist; songwriter
- Known for: Original Australian voice of Siri
- Notable work: Soundtrack for Dawson's Creek

Karen Jacobsen is an Australian-born New York-based entertainer, singer, motivational speaker, voiceover artist, and songwriter.

== Early life and education ==
Karen Jacobsen was born in Mackay, Queensland, Australia. She started writing songs at the age of seven, and was inspired to be a professional singer by her idol Olivia Newton-John.

She graduated from the Queensland Conservatorium Griffith University, studying jazz in the late 1980s earning an Associate Diploma of Music (Jazz). She had been trained in classical singing and studied pianoforte earning an Associate in Music, Australia (AMusA) from AMEB.

In Brisbane she sang jingles, moving to Sydney becoming a voice-over artist for radio and tv commercials and performing in the original Australian cast of Buddy - The Buddy Holly Story at Her Majesty's Theatre, singing the USA national anthem 220 times in six months. Jacobsen became a regular musical performer on Bert Newton's Good Morning Australia.

== Career ==
=== U.S. ===
On 4 July 2000, she relocated to New York City, writing and recording songs, and has since released over a dozen albums on her independent label Kurly Queen.

Her songs have been on soundtracks for Dawson's Creek and the NBC show Passions, and she has shared the stage with Christopher Cross, Neil Sedaka, Norah Jones, Cyndi Lauper, Spyro Gyra, Deborah Cox, Jars of Clay, Three Dog Night, and Rachael Sage. Three songs she co-wrote were released by ARIA Hall of Fame recording artists Vika & Linda on their number one Australian Album Where Do You Come From? including the single "That's How I Pray", "Little Baby" and "I Hit Pause".

In 2002, Jacobsen's speaking voice was chosen as one of the Australian English options for the text-to-speech system used in GPS units for Garmin, Navman, TomTom, and Mio and in telephone and computer software systems. Jacobsen has been dubbed by ABC News and CBS News as 'The Dashboard Diva' and by the Gold Coast Bulletin as 'Gadget Girl'. Harry Connick Jr called her 'hypnotic' on his daytime talk show and she was a clue in The New York Times crossword puzzle.

She created the empowerment brand "The GPS Girl®" and in speaking engagements and performances shares the "five directions for recalculating", "How to Recalculate in Business and Life", and "The GPS Girl's Top Ten Directions for Life".

From 2011 to 2014, Jacobsen's voice was used as the original female Australian voice of the Siri application on Apple iPhones, iPods and iPads.

Jacobsen was president of the New York Chapter of the National Speakers Association in 2015 and performed on the main stage of the national conference singing "The Star-Spangled Banner" and for the NSA Youth Convention in San Diego in 2014. She served on the board of directors of the National Speakers Association, as Secretary (2017 to 2019)

She has appeared as Keynote Speaker and concert performer at hundreds of national and international events including the Global Speakers Summit in Vancouver (2013), the World Meetings Forum in Cancun (2014), the World Contact Forum in Mexico City (2014), the Australian Asphalt Pavement Association conference (2015) Gold Coast, Australian National Association of Teachers of Singing conference (2015) Tasmania and at TEDxTraverseCity in Michigan USA. Jacobsen was closing keynote speaker at Project Management Institute's Symposium in Singapore, on corporate day at the Global Speakers Summit in Auckland New Zealand (2018), Woodford Folk Festival (2023), Supercomputing Asia NCI Conference in Sydney, Australia (2024), Airlie Beach Festival of Music (2024)

In New York, Jacobsen performed her one-woman show at the piano at off-Broadway theatres Stage 72 at The Triad, the Laurie Beechman Theatre, and Joe's Pub at the Public Theatre, The Duplex, and The Bitter End.

Jacobsen has released albums of her music and songs since 1993, including "Here In My Heart" with tracks produced by Andy Zulla and Julian Harris (2004), "Fun, Fun, Fun, Fun, Fun, Fun with Supa K" with composer Michael Whalen (2011), "Take a Little Drive" (2013), "Destination Christmas" (2015),Ready For What I Came Here For (2021), Misogyny Opus (2023) The Slipstream (2024) I Was a Man (2024) and Seed (2025)

On Christmas Eve 2015, Jacobsen performed "Hark! The Herald Angels Sing" on the live telecast of the Vision Australia Carols by Candlelight at the Sidney Myer Music Bowl in Melbourne, Australia.

She performed "Advance Australia Fair" at the State of Origin Rugby League game on 22 June 2016 for a capacity crowd of 52,000 at Suncorp Stadium in Brisbane.

In November 2017, Jacobsen performed an arrangement of "America the Beautiful" with the High Point University Chamber Singers at HPU's annual Veterans Day Celebration, and was appointed a Global Artist in Residence at High Point University in December 2017.

=== Australia ===
In 2020, due to the COVID-19 pandemic, Jacobsen left her New York home of 20 years for Queensland and moved to Airlie Beach in the Whitsundays, Queensland. As official destination ambassador she promoted the region through media appearances, record breaking advertising campaigns and her original music, videos and performances. Her one woman show Mackay to Manhattan was premiered at Mackay Entertainment and Convention Centre (2020).

To commemorate the 10th anniversary of former Australian Prime Minister Julia Gillard's iconic misogyny speech, Jacobsen set the speech to music word for word. The Misogyny Opus is a one-hour pop orchestral work, with the first section released in October 2022 with a music video including 70 equality advocates from around the world. As composer and soloist for the piece, Jacobsen recorded a full album and tour to spark conversation and empower a "wave of equality"."One Australian artist has gone a step further, giving the speech a glow-up into a Disney musical worthy tune by Queensland recording artist, Karen Jacobsen" The live premiere was in April, 2023 at the Mackay Entertainment and Convention Centre with musicians from the Queensland Symphony Orchestra. The Misogyny Opus studio album was nominated for Best Independent Classical Album or EP at the Australian Independent Record AIR Awards in 2024.

"Ready For What I Came Here For" a part concert, part motivational one woman show was premiered at Adelaide Fringe Festival 2026 with its USA Premiere at Hollywood Fringe Festival 2026.

Jacobsen is co-founder of the Whitsundays Songwriter Festival, the inaugural event taking place in September 2022 with a professional songwriter residency that included Graeme Connors, Tia Gostelow, Leanne Tennant, Bryce Sainty, and co-founder Francesca de Valence in Airlie Beach, North Queensland. The Whitsongfest is part of the Whitsundays Arts Festival. Whitsundays Songwriter Festival has featured Toni Childs, Vika and Linda, and Mark Sholtez (2023) Wendy Matthews, Jude York and Johnny Manuel (2024), Brad Butcher, Chris Sebastian and Zipporah (2025), Christine Anu, Tania Doko (Bachelor Girl) and Taylor Moss (2026). The festival which comprises a professional songwriter residency, songwriting summit and workshops, and a concert and conversation was nominated for Festival of the Year at the Queensland Music Awards in (2024) and (2025).

In 2024 and 2025 she was President of the Whitsundays Writers Festival.

== Other activities ==
Jacobsen travelled to Lusaka, Zambia, in 2006 to meet her sponsored child. She took part in the charity documentary film To Zambia With Love, along with Tom Hudak and Neil Gordon.

In 2014 and 2015, she was the keynote speaker for EYO, an AAUW event for young women.

In 2015, she partnered with Careflight (now LifeFlight) Helicopters and Mackay CQ Rescue in Queensland, speaking and singing at a series of events to raise awareness and funds for their lifesaving work.

In 2018, she narrated the audiobook of Broken to Brilliant - Breaking Free to be You After Domestic Violence, with anonymous stories from ten women, and she has recorded voiceover for the subsequent books in the series, Terror to Triumph, Shattered to Shining, Coerced to Courageous and Violence to Victory. Funds raised from sales support programs for survivors. She is the international patron of Broken to Brilliant.

Since 2023, Jacobsen has been an Australia Day Ambassador, speaking and performing in regional Queensland including Roma, Ayr, Ingham and Airlie Beach.

== Recognition and awards ==
- 2003: Abe Olman Scholarship, Songwriters Hall of Fame
- 2003: UK Songwriting Contest, Pop Category Runner-up
- 2016: Outstanding Alumnus of the Year, Queensland Conservatorium of Music, Griffith University
- 2024: Australian Independent Record Labels Association (AIR) Awards Nominee, Best Independent Classical Album or EP; Misogyny Opus
- 2025: Queensland Music Awards Nominee, Album of the Year; The Slipstream

== Selected publications ==
- The GPS Girl's Road Map for Your Future. 11 November 2011 – via Google Books.
- Recalculate - Directions for Driving Performance Success 04 May 2016

== Personal life ==
In 2004 Jacobsen married Production Manager Tom Hudak, living in midtown Manhattan until March of 2020 when they relocated to Australia. They share their time between the two. They have a son.

== Discography ==
=== Studio albums ===
- By Request (1993)
- Strong Woman (EP) (1996)
- As I Am (EP) (2000)
- Being Brave (EP) (2002)
- Here In My Heart (2004)
- Kissing Someone Else (USA) (2006)
- Melting Moments (Australia) (2009)
- Fun, Fun, Fun, Fun, Fun with Supa K (2011)
- Take a Little Drive (2013)
- Destination Christmas (2015)
- Ready For What I Came Here For (2021)
- Misogyny Opus (2023)
- The Slipstream (2024)
- I Was a Man (2024)
- Seed (2025)

=== Singles ===
- Motherly Love (2016)
- Take Me To Hayman Island (2021)
- Better Standard Than This (2022)
