= Don't Waste Your Anger =

Studio album by The Smith Street Band
- Released: 17 April 2020
- Length: 41:42
- Label: Pool House Records
- Producer: Michael "Fitzy" Fitzgerald

The Smith Street Band chronology
Live at the Triffid (2020)	Don't Waste Your Anger (2020)	Viva La Rev (2020)

Singles from Don't Waste Your Anger
- 1. "Big Smoke" Released: 14 February 2020; 2. "I Still Dream About You" Released: 6 April 2020

Don't Waste Your Anger is the fifth studio album by Australian punk band The Smith Street Band. It was released via Pool House Records on 17 April 2020 and debuted at number 1 on the ARIA Charts, becoming the band's first number one album.

The album was originally set to be released in June 2020, but was brought forward due to COVID-19 pandemic lockdowns and an uncertainty about when the band will be able to tour it.

The album was recorded and mixed by bassist Michael Fitzy in the band's Bush House Studios in regional Victoria. To promote the album, Wil Wagner performed an acoustic set live on the band's Facebook and conduct live Q&A with band members.

Lee Hartney has stated his guitar work on this record was primarily influenced by Jeff Russell of Signals Midwest which resulted in experimenting with more flanger pedals, pick slides and an overall internal growth as a musician.

== Critical reception ==
Chloe Grimshaw from The Creative Issue said "Don't Waste Your Anger is the reflective, honest and human album that perfectly accompanies life at the moment." saying the album is "something quite transformative and unapologetically raw".

== Track listing ==
All music is composed by The Smith Street Band

No.	Title	Length
1.	"God Is Dead"	4:17
2.	"Big Smoke"	3:31
3.	"I Still Dream About You"	4:28
4.	"Dirty Water"	4:13
5.	"The End of the World"	3:16
6.	"Losing It"	3:39
7.	"Profiteering"	3:27
8.	"It's OK"	3:30
9.	"Heaven Eleven"	4:53
10.	"Don't Waste Your Anger"	6:28
Total length:		41:42

== Charts ==
Chart performance for Don't Waste Your Anger
Chart (2020)	Peak position
Australian Albums (ARIA)	1

== See also ==
- List of number-one albums of 2020 (Australia)
