= Throw Me in the River =

Studio album by The Smith Street Band
- Released: 31 October 2014
- Genre: Punk rock, indie rock
- Length: 45:05
- Label: Poison City (AUS); Banquet (UK); SideOneDummy (USA)
- Producer: Jeff Rosenstock

The Smith Street Band chronology
Don't Fuck With Our Dreams (2013)	Throw Me in the River (2014)	Wipe That Shit-Eating Grin Off Your Punchable Face (2015)

Professional ratings
Review scores
Source	Rating
AllMusic	4/5 stars
Rolling Stone	3.5/4 stars
Punktastic	Favourable

Throw Me in the River is the third studio album by Australian punk band The Smith Street Band. It was released on Poison City Records in October 2014.

== Track listing ==
All music is composed by The Smith Street Band.

No.	Title	Length
1.	"Something I Can Hold In My Hands"	3:21
2.	"Surrender"	3:09
3.	"Surrey Dive"	4:12
4.	"Calgary Girls"	5:10
5.	"East London Summer"	3:46
6.	"The Arrogance Of The Drunk Pedestrian"	4:01
7.	"Get High, See No One"	4:34
8.	"I Don't Wanna Die Anymore"	3:54
9.	"It's Alright, I Understand"	4:56
10.	"Throw Me In The River"	3:38
11.	"I Love Life"	5:21
Total length:		45:05

2015 Expanded Edition*
No.	Title	Length
12.	"Wipe That Shit-Eating Grin Off Your Punchable Face"	5:15
13.	"God in the Name of the Father"	3:48
Total length:		54:08

- The 2015 expanded edition combines Throw Me in the River and The Smith Street Band's 2015 single Wipe That Shit-Eating Grin Off Your Punchable Face.

== Charts ==
Chart (2014)	Peak position
Australian Albums (ARIA)	18

== Personnel ==
The Smith Street Band

- Wil Wagner - vocals, guitar, keyboards
- Lee Hartney - guitar, vocals
- Michael "Fitzy" Fitzgerald - bass
- Chris Cowburn - drums, vocals

Other musicians

- Nathan Holt - trombone, trumpet
- Jemma King - cello
- Lucy Rash - violin
- Jeff Rosenstock - guitar, keyboards, piano, saxophone, synthesizer
- Todd Roth - trumpet
- Bob Vielma - trombone
- James Morris - double bass
- Jeff Russell - flanger pedal
