= More Scared of You than You Are of Me =

Studio album by The Smith Street Band
- Released: 7 April 2017
- Genres: Punk rock, indie rock
- Length: 45:05
- Labels: Pool House Records (AUS); Specialist Subject Records (UK); SideOneDummy (US)
- Producer: Jeff Rosenstock

The Smith Street Band chronology
Wipe That Shit-Eating Grin Off Your Punchable Face (2015)	More Scared of You than You Are of Me (2017)	Live at the Triffid (2020)

Singles from More Scared of You than You Are of Me
- 1. "Death to the Lads" Released: 4 November 2016; 2. "Birthdays" Released: 14 February 2017; 3. "Shine" Released: 26 May 2017; 4. "Passiona" Released: 29 November 2017

More Scared of You than You Are of Me is the fourth studio album by Australian punk band The Smith Street Band. It was released via Pool House Records on 7 April 2017.

At the J Awards of 2017, the album was nominated for Australian Album of the Year.

== Critical reception ==
Professional ratings
Aggregate scores
Source	Rating
Metacritic	87/100
Review scores
Source	Rating
Exclaim!	7/10
Kerrang!	(Favorable)
Paste	8/10

More Scared of You than You Are of Me received an average critical score of 87 out of 100, indicating "Universal Acclaim", on Metacritic, based on five reviews. Writing for Tone Deaf, Joseph Earp called the album "a stunning achievement in its own right", rating the album 4 and a half out of 5 and saying " Not a line or a hook is wasted, and despite the fact the running time brushes up close to the 40-minute mark, nothing about the record feels overlong or unnecessary. Every song is contingent; every song matters." Jessica Milsome writing for The Music gave *More Scared of You than You Are of Me* 4 out of 5 stars, saying "It's a refreshing change in the band's usually melancholic approach," and "If you're a fan of The Smith Street Band, you'll love it. If you've never tried them before, this is the album to start with." Hilary Saunders, writing for Paste Magazine gave the album an 8/10, writing; "The band's sincerity is also apparent in its name—an homage to Bruce Springsteen's legendary backing band. But More Scared of You Than You Are of Me doesn't drive listeners away with its repeated tributes and clunky title. Rather, the 12-song collection ensnares listeners with its tight song structures, yelping melodies and energy delivered via middle-of-the-neck pitched guitar riffs." Jonny Nail from Rolling Stone Australia gave the album 4/5 stars and said "As a test of the versatility of their trademark sound, More Scared Of You... is a pass. As a testament to one of the country's best lyricists in full flight, it's a true triumph." Three of the album's singles appeared in Triple J's Hottest 100 with "Death To The Lads" reaching #21 in 2016 while "Passiona" and "Birthdays" came in at #49 and #21 respectively in 2017. "Shine" also managed to chart in the Hottest 200 of 2017 coming in at #110.

== Track listing ==
All music is composed by The Smith Street Band.

No.	Title	Length
1.	"Forrest"	2:52
2.	"Birthdays"	3:34
3.	"Death to the Lads"	3:29
4.	"Song for You"	4:00
5.	"Passiona"	3:45
6.	"Run into the World"	4:56
7.	"Shine"	3:46
8.	"25"	4:08
9.	"It Kills Me to Have to Be Alive"	3:03
10.	"Suffer"	3:08
11.	"Young Once"	5:04
12.	"Laughing (Or Pretending to Laugh)"	3:36
Total length:		45:20

== Personnel ==
The Smith Street Band

- Wil Wagner – vocals, guitars, keyboards
- Lee Hartney – lead guitar, gang vocals
- Michael "Fitzy" Fitzgerald – bass, gang vocals
- Chris Cowburn – drums, percussion, vocals, timpani

Other musicians

- Jeff Rosenstock – guitar, keyboards, piano, saxophone, synthesizer, gang vocals
- Jess Locke – vocals ("Birthdays")
- Laura Stevenson – vocals ("Run into the World")
- Tim Rogers – vocals ("Run into the World")
- Tantri Mustika – gang vocals ("Shine")
- Jeff Russell – flanger pedal

== Charts ==
=== Weekly charts ===
Chart (2017)	Peak position
Australian Albums (ARIA)	3

=== Year-end charts ===
Chart (2017)	Position
Australian Albums (ARIA)	99

=== Triple J Hottest 100 ===
Year	Song	Position
2016	"Death To The Lads"	21
2017	"Shine"	110
2017	"Passiona"	49
2017	"Birthdays"	21
