= Wipe That Shit-Eating Grin Off Your Punchable Face =

EP by The Smith Street Band
- Released: 23 January 2015
- Recorded: July 2014
- Genre: Punk rock
- Length: 9:03
- Producer: Jeff Rosenstock

The Smith Street Band chronology
Throw Me in the River (2014)	Wipe That Shit-Eating Grin Off Your Punchable Face (2015)	More Scared of You than You Are of Me (2017)

Professional ratings
Review scores
Source	Rating
Punknews	4/5 stars

Wipe That Shit-Eating Grin Off Your Punchable Face is an extended play by Australian punk rock band The Smith Street Band, released digitally and on vinyl in January 2015.

The title track of the EP is inspired by and criticises the treatment of asylum seekers and refugees by Tony Abbott's government in Australia. Until the end of February 2015, all money made through sale of the EP was donated to the Asylum Seeker Resource Centre. The EP directly impacted sales of the band's album Throw Me in the River, which rose to number 105 on the Australian Albums Chart the week of its release.

The songs on this EP were recorded during the same session as Throw Me in the River in July 2014.

== Artwork ==
The artwork of the EP is a portrait of former prime minister of Australia Tony Abbott, painted by Shaun Thatcher.

== Track listing ==
All music is composed by The Smith Street Band.

No.	Title	Length
1.	"Wipe That Shit-Eating Grin Off Your Punchable Face"	5:15
2.	"God in the Name of the Father"	3:48
Total length:		9:03
