= Strange Things Happening Every Day =

1944 single by Sister Rosetta Tharpe

Single by Sister Rosetta Tharpe
- Released: 1944
- Recorded: September 1944
- Genre: Rhythm & blues; gospel; rock and roll
- Length: 3:38
- Label: Decca
- Songwriter: Traditional

Audio sample
- 30 second sample of Sister Rosetta Tharpe's "Strange Things Happening Every Day": file; help

"Strange Things Happening Every Day" is an African American spiritual that was most famously, and influentially, recorded by Sister Rosetta Tharpe in 1944. Released as a single by Decca Records, Tharpe's version featured her vocals and electric guitar, with Sammy Price (piano), bass and drums. It was the first gospel record to cross over and become a hit on the "race records" chart, the term then used for what later became the R&B chart, and reached #2 on the Billboard "race" chart published May 5, 1945.

== Background and influence ==
Originally a traditional spiritual, Tharpe recorded the song in 1944 in response to backlash from black religious leaders, who had criticized her for performing and recording gospel music for a secular audience.

The recording has been cited as both an important precursor of rock and roll, and also considered by some to be a contender for the title of first rock and roll record. A National Public Radio article commented that "Rock 'n' roll was bred between the church and the nightclubs in the soul of a queer black woman in the 1940s named Sister Rosetta Tharpe".

In June 2026, CBS News included the song in its list of the 250 essential American songs of the past 250 years.

== Other versions ==
- In recent years, versions of the song have also been recorded by Michelle Shocked, Johnny Cash, Linda Gail Lewis, Tom Jones, and Sleepy LaBeef.
- In 2020, Vika and Linda released a version as the second single from their album, Sunday (The Gospel According to Iso).
- A version is performed in the 2022 Baz Luhrmann film Elvis, based on the life of American singer-actor Elvis Presley, by Yola, who plays Tharpe. It is also included on the film's soundtrack album.
