= The Smith Street Band =

Australian rock band

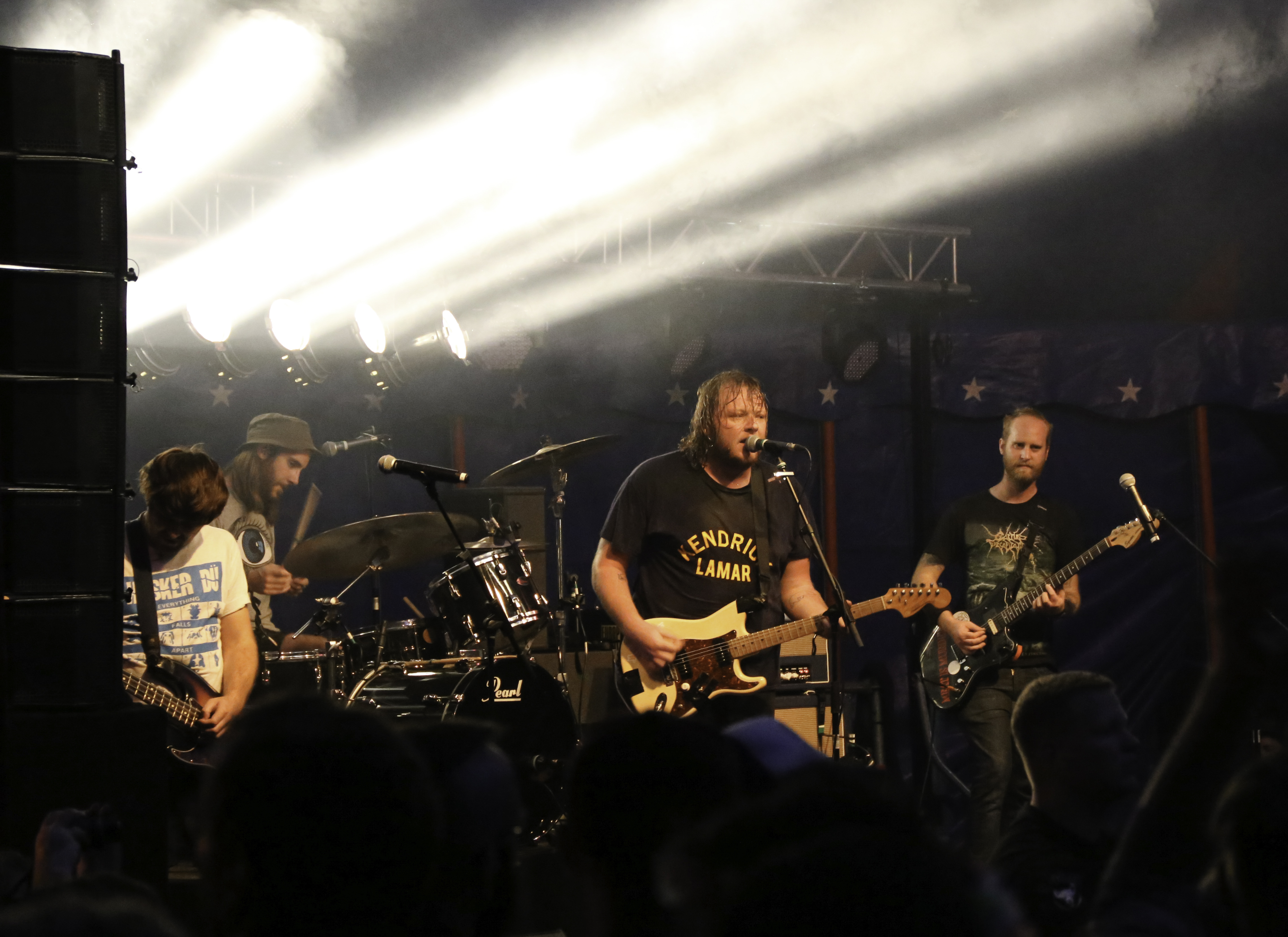
- The Smith Street Band at Rocken am Brocken Festival in Germany 2016

Background information
- Also known as: Wil Wagner & The Smith Street Band (2010–2011), Lee Hartney Sex Drive
- Origin: Melbourne, Australia
- Genres: Punk rock, indie rock, folk punk, pub rock
- Years active: 2010–current
- Labels: Jackknife Records, Poison City Records, Asian Man Records, SideOneDummy Records, Uncle M Music, Banquet Records, Pool House Records, Specialist Subject Records
- Members: Wil Wagner; Lee Hartney; Michael "Fitzy" Fitzgerald; Jess Locke; Matt Bodiam
- Past members: Tom Lawson; Jimi O'Loughlin; Chris Cowburn; Lucy Wilson
- Website: thesmithstreetband.com

The Smith Street Band are an Australian rock band from Melbourne, Victoria, in which the titular Smith Street can be found. The band have released five extended plays and seven studio albums, No One Gets Lost Anymore (2011), Sunshine and Technology (2012), Throw Me in the River (2014), More Scared of You than You Are of Me (2017), Don't Waste Your Anger (2020), Life After Football (2022) and Once I Was Wild (2025).

== History ==
=== 2010–2011: Early history ===
The band formed in 2010, composed of singer/lyricist/guitarist/keyboardist Wil Wagner, guitarist/backing vocalist Tom Lawson, guitarist Lee Hartney, bassist Jimi O'Loughlin and drummer/backing vocalist Chris Cowburn. Initially named Wil Wagner and The Smith Street Band — an allusion to Bruce Springsteen and the E Street Band — the band changed its name in 2011 to signify a change to a whole-band songwriting style.

Their debut EP, South East Facing Wall, was released on Jackknife Records in January 2011 and was reissued in 2013. The band's debut album, No One Gets Lost Anymore was released shortly after, in July 2011, on Poison City Records. Both albums received critical acclaim in Melbourne.

=== 2012–2015: Poison City Records years ===
In 2012, the group announced their Young Drunks tour to promote their new album, Sunshine and Technology, which ran from January through March, with Bomb the Music Industry! and The Bennies as support acts.

In March 2013, Wagner announced All Tomorrow's Shoeys, a three-day music festival held at Hobart's Brisbane Hotel. Curated by Wagner, the festival included Luca Brasi, The Bennies, Grim Fandango and Lincoln Le Fevre. Later that month, the band participated in the "Tram Sessions" program that involves the recording of live performances on Melbourne tram routes. The program organisers explained: "One day we asked ourselves, hmm, if only there was a band who' s [sic] name encapsulated an iconic Melbourne street which also happened to be along an iconic Melbourne route who had a typically route 86 sound... And then it came to us. The Smith Street Band!"

In August 2013, the Don't Fuck with Our Dreams EP was released. The EP's title track was inspired by the events prior to a show from the Young Drunks tour in Byron Bay, New South Wales, Australia, in which the guitarist from The Bennies was the victim of a near-fatal stabbing. The song was performed to end the band's show at The Fest event in Gainesville, Florida, US in late 2013.

In June 2014, The Smith Street Band announced Jeff Rosenstock from Bomb the Music Industry! would produce their third album, being recorded in July 2014 in the small town of Forrest, Victoria. The album is titled Throw Me in the River and was released on 31 October 2014.

In January 2015, the band released an EP titled Wipe That Shit-Eating Grin Off Your Punchable Face, which was inspired by the actions of then-Australian Prime Minister Tony Abbott and his government, particularly its stance on asylum seekers. The EP was released on 7" vinyl and as a download, with proceeds from its sales until the end of February going to the Asylum Seeker Resource Centre. The song directly impacted sales of the band's album Throw Me in the River, which rose to number 105 on the Australian Albums Chart. At the end of January, the band toured across Australia on the 26-date Get High, See Everyone tour alongside PUP, Great Cynics and Apart From This.

=== 2016–2021: Pool House Records, More Scared of You than You Are of Me and Don't Waste Your Anger ===
In November 2016, the band premiered "Death to the Lads" on Triple J, as the first single from their then-forthcoming album. A series of shows were announced as a promotional tour for the single, with bands The Nation Blue, Grim Rhythm and FOREVR. The single made it to #21 on Triple J's Hottest 100 for 2016. The following day they announced that they would be leaving Poison City Records to start their own label, Pool House Records.

In April 2016, the band toured North America with Signals Midwest and Hard Girls, which guitarist Lee Hartney has cited as "the most transformative time of my life as a musician" and that "Jeff Russell of Signals Midwest taught me what it truly meant to be a guitarist".

In February the band sent out a series of birthday cards directing fans to a website which went live on Valentines Day and debuted the second single, "Birthdays", as well as officially announcing their fourth studio album, More Scared of You than You Are of Me, confirming that it would be released through Pool House Records and produced by Jeff Rosenstock. Exclusive retailer should be Specialist Subject Records, an independent record label and shop based in Bristol, UK. The album was promoted by Triple J in April as their feature album, and a number of solo shows by Wil Wagner around the country, officially being released on the 7th. The band performed the entire album in full at a launch party, which was livestreamed via Facebook. An Australian album tour was announced with A.W., Ceres and Joyce Manor.

On 26 May 2017 the band performed the opening show of their More Scared of You than You Are of Me tour, and debuted a new touring line-up; adding label-mate Jess Locke and musician/long-time friend of the band Lucy Wilson.

In May 2017, the band premiered the video for their third single, "Shine", recreating AC/DC's video for "It's a Long Way to the Top (If You Wanna Rock 'n' Roll)" with the original director Paul Drane.

In June 2017, it was announced that the band would be opening for Midnight Oil at the Greek Theater in Los Angeles, alongside The Living End.

On 17 March 2018, Pool House Records held the inaugural Pool House Party festival at Coburg Velodrome in Melbourne, featuring label mates The Bennies and Jess Locke, local acts like Press Club, WAAX, and Baker Boy, and international guests Astronautalis and Signals Midwest.

In February 2019, Wagner was accused of harassment and emotional abuse following the circulation on social media of emails and messages sent by him, with support acts subsequently pulling out of the band's upcoming national tour that was later cancelled.

In April 2020, the band announced the release of their fifth studio album, Don't Waste Your Anger. The album became the band's first to peak at number one on the ARIA Charts. In March 2021, the band released a live unplugged album which was made up of acoustic versions of previous Smith Street Band songs and a cover of Frightened Rabbit's song "Poke".

=== 2022–present: Life After Football & Once I Was Wild ===
In October 2022, the group announced their sixth studio album, Life After Football. The album was released on 25 November 2022.

In September 2025, the group announced the forthcoming release of Once I Was Wild for November 2025.

== Band members ==
=== Current members ===
- Wil Wagner – lead vocals, guitar (2010–present), keyboards (2010–2012, 2017)
- Lee Hartney – guitar, backing vocals (2010–present)
- Michael "Fitzy" Fitzgerald – bass guitar, backing vocals (2012–present)
- Jess Locke – guitar, backing vocals (2018–present; touring musician 2017–2018), keyboards (2021–present)
- Matt Bodiam – drums (2018–present; touring musician 2017–2018)

=== Former members ===
- Jimi O'Loughlin – bass guitar (2010–2012)
- Tom Lawson – guitar, backing vocals (2010–2012)
- Chris Cowburn – drums, backing vocals (2010–2017)
- Lucy Wilson – backing vocals, keyboards, percussion, acoustic guitar (2018–2021; touring musician 2017–2018)

== Discography ==
=== Studio albums ===
List of studio albums, with selected details and chart positions
Title	Album details	Peak chart positions
Title	Album details	AUS
No One Gets Lost Anymore	Released: 7 April 2011; Label: Poison City (PCR042); Formats: CD, digital download, LP	41
Sunshine and Technology	Released: 24 August 2012; Label: Poison City (PCR055); Formats: CD, digital download, LP	—
Throw Me in the River	Released: 31 October 2014; Label: Poison City (PCR100); Formats: CD, digital download, LP	18
More Scared of You than You Are of Me	Released: 7 April 2017; Label: Pool House (PHR002); Formats: CD, digital download, LP, streaming	3
Don't Waste Your Anger	Released: 17 April 2020; Label: Pool House (PHR029); Formats: CD, digital download, LP, streaming	1
Life After Football	Released: 25 November 2022; Label: Pool House (PHR044CD); Formats: CD, 2×CD, digital download, LP, streaming	35
Once I Was Wild	Released: 21 November 2025; Label: Pool House (PHR049CD); Formats: CD, digital download, streaming	14

=== Live albums ===
List of live albums, with selected details and chart positions
Title	Album details	Peak chart positions
Title	Album details	AUS
Live at the Triffid	Released: 20 March 2020; Label: Pool House; Formats: Digital download, streaming	4
Viva La Rev	Released: 6 November 2020; Label: Pool House; Formats: Digital download, streaming	30
Unplugged in Wombat State Forest	Released: 5 March 2021; Label: Pool House; Formats: CD, DVD, cassette, digital download, streaming	11

=== EPs ===
List of extended plays, with selected details
Title	EP details
South East Facing Wall	Released: 27 January 2011, November 2018 (streaming); Label: Jackknife Music (JKM#4); Formats: CD, digital download
Don't Fuck with Our Dreams	Released: 9 August 2013; Label: Poison City (PCR070); Formats: CD, digital download, vinyl
Wipe That Shit-Eating Grin Off Your Punchable Face	Released: 26 January 2015; Label: Poison City (PCR101); Formats: Digital download, vinyl
Little Elephant Session	Note: Live session recorded at Little Elephant; Released: December 2016; Label: Little Elephant; Formats: Numbered vinyl
Little Elephant Session 2	Note: Live session recorded at Little Elephant; Released: December 2017; Label: Little Elephant; Formats: Numbered vinyl

=== Singles ===
Year	Title	Album
2012	"Young Drunk"	Sunshine & Technology
2013	"Ducks Fly Together"	Don't Fuck with Our Dreams
2014	"Surrender"	Throw Me in the River
2015	"Something I Can Hold in My Hands"	Throw Me in the River
2015	"I Scare Myself Sometimes" (featuring Lucy Wilson)	non album single
2016	"Death to the Lads"	More Scared of You than You Are of Me
2017	"Birthdays"	More Scared of You than You Are of Me
2017	"Shine"	More Scared of You than You Are of Me
2017	"Passiona"	More Scared of You than You Are of Me
2019	"I Am Nothing / Chips & Gravy"	non album single
2020	"Big Smoke"	Don't Waste Your Anger
2020	"I Still Dream About You"	Don't Waste Your Anger
2021	"Its OK"	Unplugged in Wombat State Forest
2022	"I Don't Wanna Do Nothing Forever"	Life After Football
2022	"Life After Football"	Life After Football
2025	"This Is It"	Once I Was Wild
2025	"Star Child"	Once I Was Wild
2025	"Once I Was Wild"	Once I Was Wild

== Awards and nominations ==
=== AIR Awards ===
The Australian Independent Record Awards (commonly known informally as AIR Awards) is an annual awards night to recognise, promote and celebrate the success of Australia's Independent Music sector.

Year	Nominee / work	Award	Result
2013	Sunshine and Technology	Best Independent Hard Rock or Punk Album	Nominated
2015	Throw Me in the River	Best Independent Hard Rock or Punk Album	Nominated
2018	More Scared of You Than You Are of Me	Best Independent Hard Rock or Punk Album	Nominated

=== EG Awards / Music Victoria Awards ===
The EG Awards (known as Music Victoria Awards since 2013) are an annual awards night celebrating Victorian music. They commenced in 2006.

Year	Nominee / work	Award	Result	Ref.
2012	The Smith Street Band	Best New Talent	Nominated	
2015	The Smith Street Band	Best Live Band	Won	
2017	"Death to the Lads"	Best Song	Nominated	

=== J Awards ===
The J Awards are an annual series of Australian music awards that were established by the Australian Broadcasting Corporation's youth-focused radio station Triple J. They commenced in 2005.

Year	Nominee / work	Award	Result
2017	More Scared of You Than You Are of Me	Australian Album of the Year	Nominated

=== National Live Music Awards ===
The National Live Music Awards (NLMAs) are a broad recognition of Australia's diverse live industry, celebrating the success of the Australian live scene. The awards commenced in 2016.

Year	Nominee / work	Award	Result
2016	themselves	Live Act of the Year	Won
2017	Lee Hartney (The Smith Street Band)	Live Guitarist of the Year	Nominated
