= Fern Jones =

American singer (1923–1996)

Fern Jones (1923–1996) was an American singer from Arkansas who blended traditional gospel music with elements of country and rockabilly.

Jones got married at 16 to Ray Jones, and with her husband and children, she toured the Southern revival circuit. She recorded two albums, one with her husband, Ray, called "The Joneses Sing" released on the Christian Faith label. The second, from Dot Records in 1959, "Singing A Happy Song." The two albums were re-mastered with most of the tracks appearing in the 2005 release from Numero Group, called "Fern Jones, The Glory Road" and the other tracks available for download. Fern and Ray's music is heard frequently in movies and on television and is sold in multiple formats.

The Glory Road was later reissued by The Numero Group.

== Glory Road tracklist ==
1. I Am A Pilgrim (2:30)
2. You Ain't Got Nuthin' (2:40)
3. I Do Believe (2:05)
4. I Was There When It Happened (2:06)
5. Be Thankful You're You (2:26)
6. Strange Things Happening Every Day (2:26)
7. I Ain't Got Time (2:14)
8. Just A Little Talk With Jesus (2:19)
9. Keeps Me Busy (2:33)
10. Take My Hand, Precious Lord (2:40)
11. Let Tomorrow Be (1:59)
12. Didn't It Rain (2:29)
13. I Was There When It Happened (Alternate Version) (2:20)
14. My Prayer For The Ones I Love (2:27)
15. I Do Believe (Alternate Version) (2:16)
16. I Don't Know (2:17)
17. We'll Understand It By And By (2:00)
18. Whispering Hope (2:00)
19. Keeps Me Busy (Alternate Version) (2:32)
20. Let Tomorrow Be (Alternate Version) (2:04)
21. I Don't Care What The World May Do (2:10)
22. Just A Closer Walk (2:41)
23. This World Is Not My Home (1:57)
24. When A Sinner Prays (2:37)
