= At the Mouth of the River =

Studio album by Vika and Linda
- Released: 18 June 1996
- Recorded: 1995
- Studio: Real World Studios, Box, England; The Underground Quarry, Corsham, England
- Genre: Rock; pop; folk
- Length: 55:39
- Label: Real World

Vika and Linda chronology
Vika and Linda (1994)	At the Mouth of the River (1996)	Princess Tabu (1996)

At the Mouth of the River is a folk music compilation album by Australian vocal duo, and sisters, Vika and Linda Bull. Released internationally via Real World Records in June 1996, it provides five previously unreleased songs plus newly recorded versions of previously released ones.

== Track listing ==
At the Mouth of the River – Real World Records (WSCD005)
No.	Title	Writer(s)	Length
1.	"Akilotoa"	Wilfred Jeffs	2:57
2.	"Set on Freedom"	Odetta Gordon	4:47
3.	"Hard Love"	Paul Kelly	5:36
4.	"99 Years"	Kelly, Vika Bull, Linda Bull	3:59
5.	"I Know Where to Go to Feel Good"	Kelly	3:15
6.	"Sacred Things"	Joe Camilleri, N Smith	3:53
7.	"Raise Your Voices"	V Bull, L Bull	3:07
8.	"We've Started a Fire"	Kelly	4:35
9.	"Love Me Like a Man"	William Smither	5:36
10.	"Que Sera, Sera (Whatever Will Be, Will Be)"	Jay Livingston, Ray Evans	6:43
11.	"Two Wings"	traditional	2:50
12.	"Up Above My Head"	traditional	2:34
13.	"Many Rivers to Cross"	Jimmy Cliff	5:47

- Tracks not previously recorded by Vika and Linda: "Akilotoa", "Raise Your Voices", "Love Me Like a Man", "Que Sera, Sera (Whatever Will Be, Will Be)" and "Two Wings".

== Personnel ==
Musicians

- Linda Bull – vocals
- Vika Bull – vocals
- Jeff Burstin – guitars (acoustic, electric)
- Bruce Haymes – organ, electric piano
- Stuart Speed – double bass
- John Watson – drums

Recording

- David Bottrill – engineer
- Sam Gibson – assistant engineer

Artwork

- Vince Goodsell – photography
- Stephen Lovell-Davis – photography
- Tristan Manco – design, graphic design
- Amy Robins – design, design assistant
