= Between Two Shores (Vika and Linda album) =

Studio album by Vika and Linda
- Released: 23 September 2006
- Recorded: June 2006
- Studio: Studio One, Collingwood, Victoria
- Genre: Folk; world; Country
- Length: 59:58
- Label: Liberation
- Producer: Vika and Linda; Chris Bekker; Dion Hirini

Vika and Linda chronology
Tell the Angels (2004)	Between Two Shores (2006)	Vika and Linda Live 2010 (2010)

Between Two Shores is the fifth studio album by Australia vocal duo Vika & Linda Bull. The album features some of the most popular songs of Vika and Linda Bulls's career, including some from their time with Black Sorrows. The album was released on 23 September 2006 via Liberation Records.

The album was dedicated to Stuart Speed, Vika and Linda's bass player who died during the making of the album.

== Critical reception ==
An Amazon.com editorial said: "Highlights include a heavy groove version of the Black Sorrows' hit single of 1989, "Chained to the Wheel"; a reggae take on "When Will You Fall for Me" and a soulful reconstruction of Barry Palmer's "Love Comes Easy".

== Track listing ==
Between Two Shores track listing
No.	Title	Writer(s)	Lead vocals	Length
1.	"Chained to the Wheel"	Joe Camilleri / Nick Smith	Vika & Linda	3:59
2.	"When Will You Fall for Me"	Mark Seymour	Vika	4:22
3.	"Never Let Me Go"	Camilleri / Smith	Vika	3:58
4.	"I Know Where to Go to Feel Good"	Paul Kelly	Vika & Linda	3:12
5.	"House of Love"	Wayne Burt	Linda	4:00
6.	"These Hands"	Eris O'Brien	Linda	3:21
7.	"The Blue Hour"	Stephen Cummings / Chris Abrahams	Vika	4:01
8.	"Holy Waters"	Cyndi Boste	Linda	5:18
9.	"Ninety Nine Years"	Kelly / Vika & Linda	Vika	3:57
10.	"Love Comes Easy"	Barry Palmer / Vika & Linda	Linda	3:29
11.	"Hard Love"	Kelly	Vika	5:04
12.	"Grandpa's Song"	Michael Barker / Vika & Linda	Linda	5:55
13.	"The Parting Song"	Kelly / Vika & Linda	Vika	4:09
14.	"Between Two Shores"	Kelly / Vika & Linda	Linda	5:13

== Personnel ==
- Chris Bekker – acoustic guitar, backing vocals
- Dion Hirini – acoustic guitar, backing vocals
- John Watson – drums and percussion
- Justin Stanford – percussion
- Vika and Linda – percussion and vocals

== Release history ==
Release history and formats for Between Two Shores
Region	Date	Format(s)	Label	Catalogue
Australia	23 September 2006	CD, digital download	Liberation	BLUE093.2
