= Two Wings (album) =

Studio album by Vika and Linda
- Released: August 1999
- Genre: Rock; pop; world; folk
- Length: 39:29
- Label: Mushroom
- Producer: Paul Kelly; Chris Dickie; Renée Geyer

Vika and Linda chronology
| Princess Tabu (1996) | Two Wings (1999) | Live & Acoustic (2000) |

Singles from Vika and Linda
- 1. "Caution" Released: 1999

Two Wings is the third studio album by Australia vocal duo Vika & Linda Bull. The album was released in August 1999 and debuted and peaked at number 34 on the Australian ARIA Charts in September 1999.

Australian music journalist Ian McFarlane described the album as an "inspired song selection ranging from blues and gospel to reggae and soul."

At the ARIA Music Awards of 2000, the album was nominated for Best Adult Contemporary Album, but lost to Into the Land of Promise by Karma County.

== Reception ==
Billboard magazine said the song choices were exquisite and praised the harmonies calling them "luscious" on "God's Little Birds". Adding ""Feel the Spirit" is a traditional stomper".

== Track listing ==
1. "I'm On My Way" (Vika and Linda, Renée Geyer)
2. "Be Careful What You Pray For" (Paul Kelly)
3. "Home in Your Heart" (Otis Blackwell, Winfield Scott)
4. "Caution" (Bob Marley)
5. "God's Little Birds" (Ola Mae Terrell)
6. "Reach for You" (Archie Roach)
7. "Lead Me On" (Deadric Malone, Gwen McRae)
8. "Let Me In" (Paul Kelly)
9. "If I Could Start Today Again" (Paul Kelly)
10. "Feeling Good" (Anthony Newley, Leslie Bricusse)
11. "Tied in Knots" (Tim Rogers)
12. "Feel the Spirit" (Vika and Linda, Paul Kelly, Renée Geyer)

== Personnel ==
- David Wilson – backing vocals (track 10)
- Janine Maunder – backing vocals (track 10)
- Linda Bull – backing vocals (tracks 2, 4, 5, 11)
- Renée Geyer – backing vocals (tracks 1, 4, 5, 7, 11, 12)
- Suze Ahern – backing vocals (track 10)
- Vika Bull – backing vocals (tracks 4, 5, 7, 8, 12)
- Bill McDonald – bass (tracks 1 to 8, 10 to 12)
- Peter Barrett – cover design
- John Watson – drums
- Michael Barker – drums
- Barry Palmer – guitar
- Jeff Burstin – guitar
- Justin Stanford – guitar
- Paul Kelly – guitar
- Bruce Haymes – piano, organ, keyboards
- Paul Williamson – saxophone
- Russell Smith – trumpet

== Charts ==
Chart performance for Two Wings
| Chart (1999) | Peak position |
|---|---|
| Australian Albums (ARIA) | 34 |
