= Sunday (The Gospel According to Iso) =

Studio album by Vika and Linda
- Released: 11 September 2020
- Genre: Gospel music
- Label: Bloodlines Music
- Producer: Cameron Bruce; Vika and Linda Bull

Vika and Linda chronology
'Akilotoa (2020)	Sunday (The Gospel According to Iso) (2020)	The Wait (2021)

Singles from Sunday (The Gospel According to Iso)
- 1. "There Ain't No Grave (Gonna Hold My Body Down)" Released: 24 July 2020; 2. "Strange Things Happening Every Day" Released: 27 July 2020; 3. "I Don't Cost Very Much" Released: 3 August 2020; 4. "Jesus On the Mainline" Released: 10 August 2020; 5. "Memphis Flu" Released: 17 August 2020

Sunday (The Gospel According to Iso) is the sixth studio album by Australian vocal duo Vika and Linda Bull and was released on 11 September 2020.

At the AIR Awards of 2021, the album won Best Independent Blues and Roots Album or EP.

== Background and release ==
When the first COVID-19 pandemic lockdown began in Melbourne in March 2020, Vika and Linda Bull decided to sing one gospel song each Sunday morning for their followers on social media. The weekly performance became known as the "Sunday Sing Song". Vika said "It's kept our spirits up and we've had great feedback from people".

Following the feedback, the sisters decided to record an album of gospel songs. Music director Cameron Bruce played piano from his home in New South Wales and sent the files to Melbourne where the sisters added the vocals.

In a statement, the Linda said "Gospel is a genre we know we can do faithfully. It doesn't feel laboured for us, it feels like a release and when we sing these songs, we feel better. And when that happens, hopefully people will feel the same way." Vika added "Gospel music has been a huge influence on the way we sing; We love the rawness and minimal instrumentation of the early recordings of the great vocal powerhouses like Sister Rosetta Tharpe, Aretha Franklin and Mahalia Jackson."

The tracklist originated from a list of 175 songs Paul Kelly sent Vika and Linda several years ago. During the lockdown they cycled through the songs and eventually settled on 12, plus an original, "Shallow Grave" written by Kasey Chambers and Harry Hookey.

== Critical reception ==
Jeff Jenkins from Stack Magazine said "You don't have to be a believer to dig these tunes" saying, "There's something special about siblings singing together and the sisters' voices beautifully complement each other. Vika's vocal takes no prisoners, grabbing you by the scruff of the neck, whereas Linda's voice lures the listener with its subtler tone." Jenkins said "a standout is a three-way duet with Paul Kelly".

== Track listing ==
No.	Title	Writer(s)	Length
1.	"There Ain't No Grave (Gonna Hold My Body Down)"	Claude Ely	3:12
2.	"Strange Things Happening Every Day"	Sister Rosetta Tharpe	2:44
3.	"It Don't Cost Very Much"	Thomas A. Dorsey	3:27
4.	"Memphis Flu"	Benjamin Hanby	2:30
5.	"In the Land Where We'll Never Grow Old" (featuring Paul Kelly)	James Cleveland Moore, Sr	2:49
6.	"Bridge Over Troubled Water"	Paul Simon	5:19
7.	"Sinnerman"	traditional; Nina Simone	2:45
8.	"Shallow Grave"	Kasey Chambers; Harry Hookey	3:24
9.	"Downbound Train"	Chuck Berry	2:56
10.	"Jesus On the Mainline"	traditional; Ry Cooder	3:12
11.	"Didn't It Rain"	traditional; Sister Rosetta Tharpe	2:00
12.	"Walk with Me Lord"	Reese Dayan	2:23
13.	"Amazing Grace"	traditional	3:36

== Charts ==
Chart performance for Sunday (The Gospel According to Iso)
Chart (2020)	Peak position
Australian Albums (ARIA)	2

== Release history ==
Region	Date	Format	Label	Catalogue
Various	11 September 2020	CD; streaming; digital download	Bloodlines	BLOOD78
Australia	25 September 2020	LP	Bloodlines	BLOODLP78
