= Princess Tabu =

Studio album by Vika and Linda
- Released: July 1996
- Genre: Folk; world; country
- Label: Mushroom
- Producer: Vika and Linda; Diesel; Jeremy Allom

Vika and Linda chronology
At the Mouth of the River (1996)	Princess Tabu (1996)	Two Wings (1999)

Singles from Vika and Linda
- 1. "Love Comes Easy" Released: September 1996; 2. "The Parting Song" Released: December 1996; 3. "Grandapa's Song" Released: 1997

Princess Tabu is the second studio album by Australian vocal duo, and sisters, Vika & Linda Bull. It was released in July 1996 and debuted and peaked at number 30 on the Australian ARIA albums chart. According to Vika and Linda's website, the title is inspired by fairytale or fable about twin sisters. Their mother died in childbirth, and they were separated for ten years, they grew up alone, and apart. One was called Princess 'Ta', and the other, Princess 'Bu'.

At the ARIA Music Awards of 1997, the album was nominated for Best Adult Contemporary Album, but lost to Good Luck by My Friend The Chocolate Cake.

== Track listing ==
1. "The Parting Song" – 4:01
2. "The Honey Bee" – 3:56
3. "Grandpa's Song" – 4:39
4. "Only in My Dreams" – 4:11
5. "Mama Shake That Thing" – 3:20
6. "Love Comes Easy" – 3:54
7. "Princess Tabu" – 3:56
8. "Don't Wanna Be a Nutcase" – 2:58
9. "Carry Me" – 4:31
10. "Between Two Shores" – 4:09
11. "Akilotoa" – 3:54
12. "Malo" – 1:35

1997 bonus disc

1. "Mama Shake That Thing" – 3:16
2. "The Honey Bee" – 4:09
3. "When Will You Fall for Me" – 3:56
4. "Grandpa's Song" (Spoken Word Introduction) – 3:02
5. "Grandpa's Song" – 4:46
6. "Hard Love" – 5:24
7. "Brand New Ways" – 5:19
8. "Princess Tabu" – 3:50
9. "The Parting Song" – 4:56

== Charts ==
Chart performance for Princess Tabu
Chart (1996)	Peak position
Australian Albums (ARIA)	30
New Zealand Albums (RMNZ)	39
