= Signals Midwest =

American punk rock band

- Origin: Cleveland, Ohio
- Genres: Punk rock
- Years active: 2008–present
- Labels: Lauren Records, Tiny Engines
- Members: Max Stern; Ryan Williamson; Jeff Russell; Steve Gibson
- Past members: Loren Shumaker
- Website: signalsmidwest.bandcamp.com

Signals Midwest is an American punk rock band from Cleveland, Ohio.

== History ==
Signals Midwest formed in 2008. In 2009, the band self-released their first full-length album titled Burn the Blueprints. In 2011, the band released their second full-length album titled Latitudes and Longitudes after signing with the record label Tiny Engines. Also in 2011, the band released a split with Shady Ave. In 2013, the band released their third studio album and second with Tiny Engines titled Light on the Lake. In 2016, Signals Midwest released their fourth full-length album and third with Tiny Engines titled At This Age. On June 19, 2019, Signals Midwest premiered the track, “Your New Old Apartment,” off their EP Pin, which was released on August 2 via Lauren Records. On April 8, 2022, their 5th full-length album Dent was released on Lauren Records.

== Band members ==
Current members

- Max Stern – lead vocals, lead guitar
- Ryan Williamson – bass
- Jeff Russell – rhythm guitar
- Steve Gibson – drums, backing vocals

Former members

- Loren Shumaker – bass

== Discography ==
Studio albums

- Burn the Blueprints (2009)
- Latitudes and Longitudes (2011)
- Light on the Lake (2013)
- At This Age (2016)
- Dent (2022)

EPs

- Signals Midwest/Shady Ave. Split 7" (2011)
- French Exit/Signals Midwest Split 7" (2012)
- Signals Midwest/Worship This! Split 7" (2013)
- Wherever I Might Land (2014)
- Pin (2019)
- Signals Midwest / ANORAK! Split 7" (2024)
