= Live & Acoustic (Vika and Linda album) =

Live album by Vika and Linda
- Released: November 2000
- Recorded: The Continental Hotel, (Melbourne)
- Genre: Rock; pop; World music; Folk music
- Label: Mushroom Records
- Producer: Jeff Burstin; Vika and Linda

Vika and Linda chronology
Two Wings (1999)	Live & Acoustic (2000)	Love is Mighty Close (2002)

Live & Acoustic is the first live album by Australian vocal duo Vika & Linda Bull. The album was recorded at The Continental Hotel in Melbourne and released in November 2000 on Mushroom Records. It was the duos final release on this label.

== Critical reception ==
Molly Wishart from The Green Left said the album is "superb" and to buy this "then you'll want all the others." Australian musician journalist Ed Nimmervoll named the album his "album of the week", complementing the two voices, saying; "Vika [is] strong and soulful [and] Linda [is] soft and gentle." adding "When Vika and Linda left the Black Sorrows they took out their little black book and called up all the great songwriters that are part of their circle, and armed with their songs they released what was essentially an extension of their Black Sorrows work, creating a vacuum Joe Camilleri found hard to fill. This live album brings us back to the start, pure Vika and Linda, just singing together, as they always have and always will, applying all the experience and confidence they've accumulated, more gospel than you might expect. The entire performance starts and ends with two songs Paul Kelly would probably never have written if he didn't know he intended Vika and Linda to record them, such fine songs that Paul performs them himself, but it's probably Vika and Linda who stamp those songs as two of the best moments in Paul's songwriting career. This album is worth having just for "Be Careful What You Pray For" and "If I Could Start Today Again"."

== Track listing ==
CD/Cassette (MUSH332862)

1. "Be Careful What You Pray For" (Paul Kelly) - 4:22
2. "Two Wings" (Linda and Vika Bull) - 3:21
3. "I'm On My Way" (Linda and Vika Bull, Renée Geyer) - 4:34
4. "We've Started a Fire" (Paul Kelly) - 6:03
5. "When Will You Fall For Me" (Mark Seymour) - 5:55
6. "God's Little Birds" (O.M. Terrell) - 4:17
7. "Grandpa's Songs" (Michael Barker, Vika and Linda Bull) - 6:18
8. "Princess Tabu" (Michael Barker, Tim Finn, Vika and Linda Bull) - 4:12
9. "Hard Love" (Paul Kelly) - 5:05
10. "Reach For You" (Archie Roach) - 3:21
11. "Feeling Good" (Anthony Newley, Leslie Bricusse) - 4:08
12. "Feel The Spirit" (Linda and Vika Bull, Paul Kelly, Renée Geyer) - 5:02
13. "If I Could Start Today Again" (Paul Kelly) - 3:47

== Charts ==
Chart (2000)	Peak position
Australia Albums (ARIA)	138

== Credits ==
- Bass – Bill McDonald
- Guitar – Jeff Burstin
- Violin, Mandolin, Steel Guitar [Lap], Backing Vocals – Gerry Hale
