= Vika and Linda (album) =

Studio album by Vika and Linda
- Released: 6 June 1994
- Studios: Metropolis Audio and Platinum Studios, Melbourne; Periscope Studios and Studios 301, Sydney
- Genres: Rock; pop; adult contemporary; folk
- Length: 49:45
- Label: Mushroom
- Producers: Paul Kelly; Vika and Linda

Vika and Linda chronology
| Seven Deadly Sins (1993) | Vika and Linda (1994) | At the Mouth of the River (1996) |

Singles from Vika and Linda
- 1. "When Will You Fall For Me" Released: May 1994; 2. "House of Love" Released: 29 August 1994; 3. "Hard Love" Released: 1995; 4. "We've Started A Fire" Released: 1995

Vika and Linda is the debut studio album by Australia vocal duo Vika & Linda Bull. The album was released in May 1994 and debuted and peaked at number 7 on the Australian ARIA Charts in June 1994.

At the ARIA Music Awards of 1995, the album was nominated for Breakthrough Artist – Album, but lost to Frogstomp by Silverchair.

== Critical reception ==
Ed St John from Rolling Stone Australia wrote: "It's the simplest of ideas: take two of Australia's best singers, find them a bunch of great original songs, and then put them in the studio with a sympathetic producer and the best band you can muster. Not surprisingly, the results here are frequently exceptional. Beautifully played - with an accent on subtle arrangements and largely acoustic instruments - the album is imbued with a warm inner glow and a genuine musical depth. Perhaps because of the contributions of such a broad diversity of writers - and thanks also to the fact that Vika and Linda Bull possess strikingly different voices - the album moves effortlessly across a spectrum of styles but, for the most part, is a very laid-back, often country-flavoured affair. Still, far from getting bogged down in a single groove, Vika and Linda is a real feast.

It's not the kind of album where singles, or "standout tracks", are easy to pick. Sure, the first single "When Will You Fall For Me" has a terrific rousing chorus. Three of the Paul Kelly songs are killers, including the slow reggae of "We've Started A Fire" and the funky "I Know Where to Go to Feel Good". Also intriguing is "Ninety Nine Years", a song Kelly wrote with the Bull sisters. Utilising eastern tones and a haunting melody, it marks an interesting and very appealing departure for all three artists."

== Legacy ==
Double J ranked the album at #48 on their list of The 50 Best Australian Albums of the 90s, complementing the "pure, clear voices – Vika's low and gutsy, Linda's high and bright – meld into glorious harmonies, often the case with siblings but rarely done this well. The result is catchy songs with warmth at their core, both the comforting and the fiery kind."

== Track listing ==
1. "Hard Love" (Paul Kelly) – 4:40
2. "When Will You Fall for Me" (Mark Seymour) – 3:47
3. "House of Love" (Wayne Burt) – 4:12
4. "Gone Again" (Nick Barker) – 3:16
5. "We've Started a Fire" (Paul Kelly) – 5:06
6. "I Didn't Know Love Could Be Mine" (Paul Kelly) – 3:23
7. "Sacred Things" (Joe Camilleri) – 3:31
8. "Love This Time" (Wayne Burt) – 3:36
9. "Ninety Nine Years" (Paul Kelly, Vika and Linda) – 3:56
10. "I Know Where to Go to Feel Good" (Paul Kelly) – 5:03
11. "These Hands" (Eris O'Brien) – 4:28
12. "The Blue Hour" (Chris Abrahams, Stephen Cummings) – 4:55

1995 bonus disc

1. "Set on Freedom" – 4:26
2. "Up Above My Head (I Hear Music in the Air)" – 2:32
3. "Have a Little Faith in Me" – 4:01
4. "Saved" – 3:20
5. "Many Rivers to Cross" – 5:03

== Personnel ==
- Jex Saarelaht – electric piano, organ
- Jeff Burstin – guitar
- Justin Stanford – shaker
- Paul Kelly – vocals, guitar

== Charts ==
=== Weekly charts ===
Weekly chart performance for Vika and Linda
| Chart (1994–1995) | Peak position |
|---|---|
| Australian Albums (ARIA) | 7 |
| New Zealand Albums (RMNZ) | 16 |

=== Year-end charts ===
Year-end chart performance for Vika and Linda
| Chart (1995) | Position |
|---|---|
| Australian Albums (ARIA) | 67 |

== Certifications ==
Certifications for Vika and Linda
| Region | Certification | Certified units/sales |
|---|---|---|
| Australia (ARIA) | Platinum | 70,000^{^} |
^{^} Shipments figures based on certification alone.
