= Where Do You Come From? =

Studio album by Vika and Linda
- Released: 5 June 2026
- Length: 39:06
- Label: Mushroom
- Producers: Cameron Bruce; Linda Bull; Vika Bull

Vika and Linda chronology
Gee Whiz, It's Christmas! (2022)	Where Do You Come From? (2026)

Singles from Where Do You Come From?
- 1. "Where Do You Come From?" Released: 20 February 2026; 2. "That's How I Pray" Released: 27 March 2026; 3. "Bliss" Released: 8 May 2026

Where Do You Come From? is the ninth studio album by the Australian vocal duo Vika and Linda, announced in February 2026 and released on 5 June 2026.

Upon announcement, Vika said, "This isn't a light or fluffy record, it's real life, mistakes, forgiveness and trying to find some peace." Linda added: "Every record has mattered, but this time, we reached for something deeper." In a conversation with Noise11 in May 2026, the sisters said the more personal songwriting emerged following the release of their 2022 memoir No Bull with Linda saying, "That was the springboard for the album We knew that any book that's interesting is where people are completely honest and truthful about where they are in that point in their lives." The album explores themes of identity, family, motherhood, ancestry, grief and menopause, with the sisters drawing directly from experiences that shaped their lives.

The album will be supported by a 46-date Australian tour from May through to October 2026.

At the 2026 ARIA Music Awards it was nominated for Best Adult Contemporary Album and Best Group.

== Reception ==
The Australian said "After a string of lockdown-era releases and cover projects, Where Do You Come From? marks a powerful reclamation of their narrative. The album sees the duo reaching into their early history, weaving oral tradition, cultural heritage and decades of lived experience into emotionally resonant, soul-stirring songs."

== Track listing ==
Where Do You Come From? track listing
No.	Title	Writer(s)	Length
1.	"Little Baby"	Linda Bull; Vika Bull; Toni Childs; Francesca de Valence; Karen Jacobsen; Mark Sholtez	3:39
2.	"Waiting on the Kid"	L. Bull; Mark Seymour	4:08
3.	"I Hit Pause"	V. Bull; Karen Jacobsen	2:45
4.	"Where Do You Come From?"	L. Bull; V. Bull; Seymour	3:29
5.	"What a Beautiful Thing"	Helen Shanahan	3:32
6.	"That's How I Pray"	Vika Bull; Francesca De Valence; Karen Jacobsen; Mark Sholtez	3:29
7.	"Bliss"	Ben Salter	3:43
8.	"The Boy with the Broken Wing"	L. Bull; V. Bull; Seymour	3:39
9.	"The Imp of the Perverse"	Glenn Richards	4:05
10.	"Return to the Sea"	Seymour	3:55
11.	"The Boats"	Cameron Bruce	2:42
Total length:			39:06

== Personnel ==
Credits are adapted from Tidal.

=== Vika and Linda ===
- Vika Bull – vocals, production (all tracks); percussion (track 3)
- Linda Bull – vocals, production (all tracks); percussion (6, 8)

=== Additional contributors ===
- Cameron Bruce – keyboards, piano, production (all tracks); guitar (1, 3, 7), background vocals (5, 6)
- Ben Edgar – mixing (all tracks), guitar (1, 3–8, 10), pedal steel guitar (11)
- Richard Bradbeer – bass (1–7, 9), double bass (8, 10)
- Lachlan O'Kane – drums (1–9), percussion (3, 6)
- Charlotte Jacke – cello (2)
- Ben Hauptmann – guitar (4)

== Charts ==
Chart performance for Where Do You Come From?
Chart (2026)	Peak position
Australian Albums (ARIA)	1
