= Tell the Angels =

Live album by Vika and Linda
- Released: 3 May 2004
- Recorded: The Cornish Arms Hotel, (Melbourne); June / July / August 2003
- Genres: Gospel music; World music
- Label: MGM Distribution
- Producer: Vika and Linda

Vika and Linda chronology
Love is Mighty Close (2002)	Tell the Angels (2004)	Between Two Shores (2006)

Tell the Angels is the second live album by Australian vocal duo Vika & Linda Bull. The album was recorded at The Cornish Arms Hotel, (Melbourne) over twelve Sundays in June, July and August 2003 The album was released independently in May 2004.

Vika and Linda supported the release by touring Australia throughout May and June 2004 to sell out crowds. Vika and Linda also performed on The Footy Show and supported Kasey Chambers on her 2004 national tour.

== Critical reception ==
Evan Alexander from The Blurb said; "Dripping with the energy and soul of a Pentecostal church service, a sizzling live band and of course, two powerhouse vocalists make this album an extremely valid one. The songs are holy ones, Jesus is the predominant theme, but by no means should that scare anyone off, there’s enough sheer oomph here to please the most devout heathens and churchgoers will have it on automatic repeat."

Waterfront Records said; "After numerous requests to record a Gospel album, the girls deliver an inspiring collection of traditional Gospel greats that ignite passion and send your spirits soaring."

== Track listing ==
CD/Cassette (VAL007)

1. "Are You Sure"
2. "Didn't It Rain"
3. "Don't Knock"
4. "Who Rolled The Stone Away"
5. "Tell The Angels"
6. "Freedom Road"
7. "Let Us Sing"
8. "Gods Little Birds"
9. "Slow Train"
10. "John The Revelator"
11. "See How He Kept Me"

== Charts ==
The album hit the top ten on the AIR Charts where it remained for over a month.

== Credits ==
- Bass - Adam Ventouro
- Drums - John Watson
- Guitar - Dion Hirini
- Keyboards - Simon Chapman and Bruce Haymes
