= Wil Wagner =

Australian singer & songwriter (born 1990)

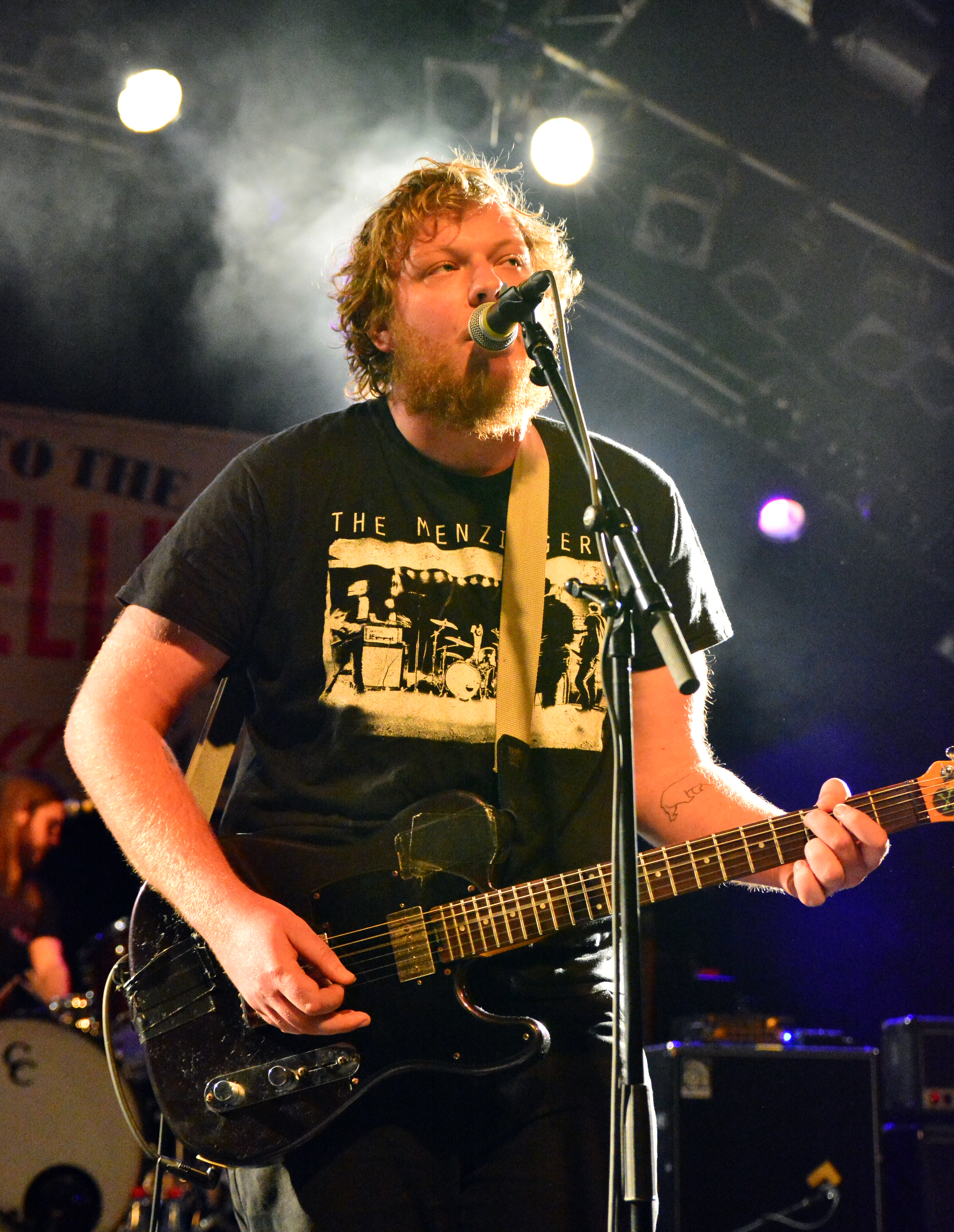
- Wagner in 2015

Background information
- Born: William Wagner; May 21, 1990 (age 36); Melbourne, Australia
- Years active: 2008–present
- Label: Poison City Records
- Member of: The Smith Street Band

William Wagner (born May 21, 1990) is an Australian singer, songwriter, guitar and keyboard player from Melbourne. He is the lead singer of The Smith Street Band.

== Career ==
In April 2008, Wagner released Us Boys Run, credited to Wil Wagner & Friends.

In 2010, Wagner self-released the EP What Started Off With Trespassing.

In March 2013, Wagner released Laika.

In July 2015, Wagner released I Hope I Don't Come Across Intense on cassette only. In April 2020, the album was released on other formats, which saw it debut at number 49 on the ARIA Charts; thus becoming Wagner's first solo charting album.

In February 2019, Wagner issued a public statement amid allegations of emotional abuse and support acts pulling out of Wagner's band (The Smith Street Band) national tour. Wagner issued a statement on his band's official Instagram account after emails dating back to 2013 were published on social media. Wagner said "I'm not hiding from anything, I said some incredibly hurtful things that I completely regret. I ask that you make up your own minds based on what has actually been said rather than form an opinion based on someone else's version." The band's statement went on to thank people for their support.

In September 2020, Wagner released Spiralling, a 7 track mini-album recorded at his band's off grid, solar powered studio, just before stage three restrictions were placed on regional Victoria. Spiralling was produced by Wil Wagner and recorded and mixed by The Smith Street Band's drummer Matt Bodiam and mastered by Joe Carra at Crystal Mastering.

In October 2021, Wagner released Live from a Beach House in the Rain, a live set recorded by Wagner in the spare room of a beach house. The album debuted at number 14 on the ARIA charts.

== Discography ==
=== Studio albums ===
List of studio albums, with selected details
Title	Details	Peak chart positions
Title	Details	AUS
Us Boys Run (as Wil Wagner & Friends)	Released: April 2008; Label: Corsican (COR001); Format: CD	—
Laika	Released: June 2013; Label: Poison City (PCR063); Format: CD, digital download, streaming, vinyl	—
I Hope I Don't Come Across Intense	Released: July 2015; Label: Business Casual (BC-006); Format: Cassette	49
Spiralling	Released: 4 September 2020; Label: Pool House (PHR030CD); Format: CD, LP digital download, streaming	9

=== Live albums ===
List of live albums, with selected details
Title	Details	Peak chart positions
Title	Details	AUS
Live from a Beach House in the Rain	Released: 14 October 2021; Label: Self-released; Format: Digital download, streaming	14

=== Extended plays ===
List of extended plays, with selected details
Title	Details
What Started Off With Trespassing	Released: 2010; Label: Will Wagner (WW:001); Formats: CD
Demo (2011)	Released: 2013; Label: Doom Cat Records (DRC011); Formats: Digital download
