= Love Is Mighty Close =

Studio album by Vika and Linda
- Released: 1 July 2002
- Label: MGM Distribution
- Producer: Jeff Burstin

Vika and Linda chronology
Live & Acoustic (2000)	Love Is Mighty Close (2002)	Tell the Angels (2004)

Love Is Mighty Close is the fourth studio album by Australian vocal duo Vika & Linda Bull. The album was released and distributed by MGM Distribution in July 2002. It is the duo's first album released independently after their contract with Mushroom Records ended. Linda Bull said it allowed them more freedom, We've always been conscious of budgets and working quickly anyway, because we didn't want to get in debt or waste someone else's opportunity. But this time we borrowed an amount of money from our mum and dad that we knew we could repay, for the recording, rather than from the record company. Now we're not A&Ring for radio, we've just made a record we like very naturally.

All songs on Love is Mighty Close are written by Australian songwriters. Linda Bull explained all the songwriters are their friends "I just get on the phone and ring them up, basically. All of those songwriters know what we do musically, so when we ask them for a song they already have an idea in mind of how we're going to sing it. It's a really easy relationship."

At the ARIA Music Awards of 2002, the album was nominated for Best Adult Contemporary Album, but lost to Nothing But a Dream by Paul Kelly.

== Critical reception ==
Molly Wishart from The Green Left said "All in all, [it's] a good album and well worth a listen. Problem is, Vika and Linda have set the bar so high that good doesn't compare to great." Wishart complemented a couple of "enjoyable ballads" but adding "missing from Love is Mighty Close is the blending of the personal and the political that characterised earlier songs such as "Between Two Shores" and "Grandpa's Song".

== Track listing ==
CD/ cassette

1. "Love is Mighty Close to You"
2. "Your Love is Like a Star"
3. "Skylarking"
4. "It Starts With Snow"
5. "You Touch Me Down to My Soul"
6. "Always Greener"
7. "Holy Waters"
8. "I Don't Want Another Lover"
9. "High and Low"
10. "To Be Good Takes a Long time"
11. "Too Many Heart"
12. "Lullaby"
