= When Will You Fall for Me =

1994 single by Vika and Linda

Single by Vika and Linda

from the album Vika and Linda
- B-side: "Brand New Ways"
- Released: 9 May 1994
- Studio: Metropolis Audio (Melbourne, Australia)
- Length: 3:47
- Label: Mushroom
- Songwriter: Mark Seymour
- Producer: Paul Kelly

Vika and Linda singles chronology
"He Can't Decide" (1993)	"When Will You Fall for Me" (1994)	"House of Love" (1994)

"When Will You Fall for Me" is a song by Australian musical duo Vika and Linda. The song was written by Mark Seymour and was released as the first single from their debut studio album, Vika and Linda (1994), on 9 May 1994. The single peaked at number 51 on the Australian ARIA Singles Chart in July 1994 and remained within the top 100 for 16 weeks.

The duo recorded a ballad version of the song on their 2000 album, Live & Acoustic (Vika and Linda album) and a reggae version on their 2006 album, Between Two Shores.

== Charts ==
Chart (1994)	Peak position
Australia (ARIA)	51
