= House of Love (Vika and Linda song) =

Song by Australian duo Vika and Linda

Single by Vika and Linda

from the album Vika and Linda
- B-side: "99 Years"
- Released: 29 August 1994
- Genre: Pop/rock
- Length: 4:12
- Label: Mushroom
- Songwriter: Wayne Burt
- Producer: Paul Kelly

Vika and Linda singles chronology
"When Will You Fall for Me" (1994)	"House of Love" (1994)	"Hard Love" (1995)

"House of Love" is a song by Australian duo Vika and Linda. It was released as the second single from their debut studio album Vika and Linda (1994). It peaked at number 98 in Australia and 32 in New Zealand.

== Track listings ==
CD/Cassette single (D11690)

1. "House of Love" – 4:12
2. "99 Years" – 3:56

== Charts ==
Weekly chart performance for "House of Love"
Chart (1994)	Peak position
Australia (ARIA)	98
New Zealand (Recorded Music NZ)	32
