= Vika and Linda =

Australian musical duo

Vika and Linda OAM
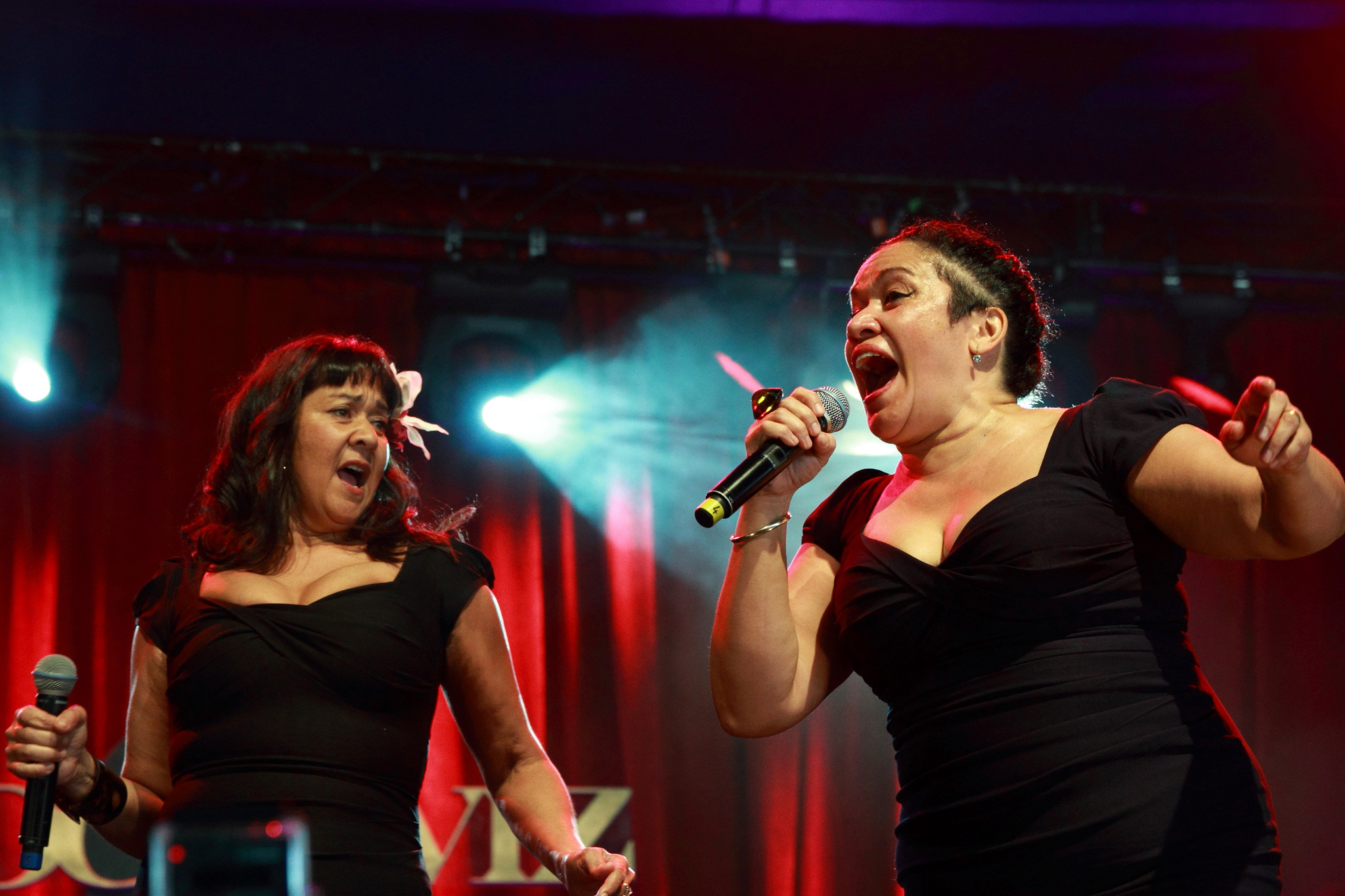
- Linda (left) and Vika at Byron Bay Bluesfest in 2014

Background information
- Also known as: Vika & Linda, Vika and Linda Bull, Bull Sisters
- Origin: Melbourne, Victoria, Australia
- Genres: Adult Contemporary, Australian Rock, soul
- Years active: 1986–present
- Labels: Mushroom/Festival; Real World; Liberation; Independent/MGM
- Members: Vika Bull; Linda Bull
Vika Bull
- Born: Vika Susan Bull; 1966 (age 59–60); Melbourne, Victoria, Australia
- Occupation: Singer
- Years active: 1986–present
- Notable work: No Bull
- Children: 1
Linda Bull
- Born: Linda Rose Bull; 1967 (age 58–59); Melbourne, Victoria, Australia
- Occupation: Singer
- Years active: 1987–present
- Notable work: No Bull
- Children: 2

Vika and Linda, also known as Vika and Linda Bull, are an Australian vocal duo consisting of Vika Susan Bull OAM (born 1966) and her younger sister, Linda Rose Bull OAM (born 1967). They came to prominence after singing backing vocals in Joe Camilleri's band The Black Sorrows from 1988. They left that group early in 1994 to start their duo with a self-titled album which was released in June that year and was certified platinum. The duo scored their first number 1 album in 2020, with their retrospective 'Akilotoa: Anthology (1994-2006). The duo have received six ARIA Music Award nominations as well as AIR Awards recognition, induction into the Music Victoria Hall of Fame, and were awarded the Order of Australia Medal (OAM) in 2022 in recognition of their outstanding contribution to the performing arts. At the 2026 ARIA Music Awards they were inducted in the ARIA Hall of Fame.

== Early life and education ==
Vika Susan Bull was born in 1966. Her sister, Linda Rose Bull, was born in Melbourne on 30 August 1967. Their mother, Siniva, who was from Tonga, arrived in Australia in 1959 as a nursing student. Their father, whose parents were local orchardists, was from Melbourne. The family lived in the conservative Melbourne suburb of Doncaster, where their mixed-race heritage stood out. As children, they regularly performed with the family at dinner dances and the Tongan church they attended. After church they would have a Tongan feast, Vika recalled in 1995, "It didn't matter what the occasion was we would sing. We had harmonies around us... and now we mainly sing gospel... It's a way of letting loose, which is what gospel music is all about". They both enjoyed singing, and were encouraged by their mother, who became their first coach, noticing their sibling vocal harmony and teaching them to hold notes in keys suited to their voices (Vika high, Linda low).

Vika left school at the age of 17 to train as a legal secretary. Both sisters got their first jobs at the Black Cat Cafe in Fitzroy in their teens, where they met a lot of musicians, and were invited to sing along with some of the bands. They retain an attachment to Fitzroy.

While growing up, the sisters had separate ambitions: Vika wanted to be a professional singer; Linda wanted to be either a visual artist or a microbiologist. Vika started training as a secretary, while Linda entered university.

== Career ==
=== 1982–1987: Blue Tomatoes, Fear of Flying, Sophisticated Boom Boom, & The Honeymooners ===
Vika and Linda had their first gig at the Purple Pit in Gertrude Street, and worked together for the first time at the Royal Derby, The Rainbow, and the Evelyn Hotel in Fitzroy. They also on occasion provided vocals for Bachelors from Prague, fronted by Henry Maas, with percussionist Justin Stanford (who later became their manager, and married Linda).

By 1983 Vika had started a band, Blue Tomatoes, with one of the café's co-owners, Tony Edwards, which covered popular soul music as well as creating some originals.

In 1984 Vika became a backing singer in a Melbourne band, Fear of Flying. After two years Vika joined Sophisticated Boom Boom. Other members of that group were Jenny Tubbs (now Barbato), Louise Taunt, Steve Purcell, Steve Dagg, Kerri Simpson, and Jeremy Rasmussen. She then started playing in the band Sophisticated Boom Boom, joined by Linda when she left university in 1987.

Vika also performed with John Justin and Thunderwings alongside Justin, Tony Featherstone, Paul Hines, Carl Manuel, Gordon Pitts, and Robert Woodrow. Later in 1987 the sisters formed their own band, The Honeymooners, with a line up of Jack Abeyratne, Thiery Fossmalle on bass guitar, and Steve Sedergreen on piano.

Vika began working as a receptionist at Platinum Studios, a recording studio. Her first recording opportunity occurred when Rebecca Barnard was using the Platinum Studios and one of her backing vocalists "lost her voice". Early in 1988 Vika released her debut solo single, "Livin' Hell", which was soon followed by a second single, "My House". Vika and Linda then worked with Barnard and Simpson in their band, The Sacred Hearts of Sweet Temptation. This led Peter Luscombe, a member of The Black Sorrows, that they should use the sisters to sing on their 1988 album Hold On to Me.

=== 1988–1993: Success with the Black Sorrows ===
By mid-1988, Vika and Linda had joined the Black Sorrows, a blues-rock group, which had formed in 1983 by Joe Camilleri (ex-Jo Jo Zep & The Falcons) on lead vocals and saxophone. The group's drummer, Peter Luscombe, recommended the sisters to Camilleri. They provided backing vocals on the Black Sorrows' fifth studio album, Hold On to Me (September 1988). The line-up was Vika and Linda, Camilleri, and Luscombe; with Wayne Burt on guitar; Jeff Burstin on guitar (both ex-Falcons); and Mick Girasole on bass guitar. The album peaked at No. 7 on the ARIA Albums Chart. Vika and Linda provided backing vocals on the band's hits on the related ARIA Singles Chart, "Hold On to Me", "Chained to the Wheel" and "The Crack-Up". For live gigs, Camilleri would give each their own "spots" displaying different voices: "Vika strong and soulful. Linda soft and gentle".

Their second album with The Black Sorrows was Harley & Rose (November 1990) and saw the duo provide lead vocals on some of the album tracks. It peaked at No. 3 and provided two top 30 singles, "Harley + Rose" and "Never Let Me Go". Better Times was released in September 1992 and peaked at No. 13. They followed with a compilation album, The Chosen Ones – Greatest Hits, in November 1993 which reached No. 4. The group toured in support of its release, Nicole Leedham of The Canberra Times noted that the band "has also been through the odd line-up change, with the latest incarnations offering the harmonies of Vika and Linda Bull, being the most successful".

Vika praised Camillleri saying that "He taught us that you have to take care of your own career, because no one else will do it for you. He taught us to watch every cent, to make sure your band is happy, and how to deal with the public". While members of The Black Sorrows, the duo provided vocals for other artists: Hunters and Collectors' What's a Few Men? (November 1987) and Ghost Nation (November 1989); Ross Wilson's Dark Side of the Man (July 1989); Archie Roach's Charcoal Lane (May 1990); John Farnham's Chain Reaction (September 1990); Seven Stories' Judges and Bagmen (1990); Deborah Conway's String of Pearls (October 1991) and Bitch Epic (1993). During the recording of Charcoal Lane, they met Paul Kelly, its producer, and a singer-songwriter in his own right.

=== 1994–2001: Vika and Linda, Princess Tabu & Two Wings ===
By February 1994 Vika and Linda had announced they would leave The Black Sorrows and were "branching into their solo careers". They began performing original works and country music covers at venues like the Cherry Tree and The Esplanade. They prepared material for their debut self-titled album. In March 1994 they performed at Canberra's National Food and Wine Frolic, where they presented their new material. Also that year the duo was invited to Tonga to sing at celebrations for the 75th birthday of King Tāufaʻāhau Tupou.

The duo's self-titled debut album was released in June 1994 on Mushroom Records and was produced by Kelly. A bonus disc, containing five gospel songs, was included with the special edition of the album. Kelly also provided guitars and backing vocals. Other session musicians were Burstin on guitars; Luscombe on drums; Stephen Hadley on bass guitar; and Jex Saarelaht on keyboards. All tracks on the standard edition were originals. Kelly had offered twelve tracks (they recorded five) including "Ninety Nine Years", which had been co-written with Vika and Linda. Three other tracks were written specifically for the duo, "When Will You Fall For Me" by Mark Seymour (of Hunters & Collectors), "House of Love" by Wayne Burt, and "These Hands That Hold Me" by Eris O'Brien. "When Will You Fall For Me" and "House of Love" were both featured as backing music on the soap opera, Home and Away. Other tracks were written by Camilleri and Stephen Cummings. Linda told The Canberra Times' Naomi Mapstone "it was amazing how friendly and helpful these people were, they could just as easily have said no because they're so busy". Another The Canberra Times review described their music as "a mix of blues, reggae, rock and country-flavoured offerings". The album peaked at No. 7 on the ARIA Albums Chart, and was certified platinum. It was also nominated for an ARIA Music Award in 1995 for 'Breakthrough Artist – Album'. In New Zealand it reached No. 16 on New Zealand Albums Chart in April 1995. Vika and Linda had four singles, "When Will You Fall For Me" (May 1994), "House of Love" (August 1994), "Hard Love" (December 1994) and "We've Started a Fire" (1995). None made the top 50 in Australia although "House of Love" reached No. 32 in New Zealand.

In November 1994 they supported Billy Joel on his Australian tour for three weeks. During the next year, they toured Europe with a backing band, which included Michael Barker on percussion. While in the UK they spent a week at Peter Gabriel's studio recording. At the Mouth of the River was a compilation of tracks, which was released on the Real World label. One of the tracks, " I Know Where to Go to Feel Good", was recorded with Iggy Pop. Also in the UK they worked at the World of Recording Week, a WOMAD (World Of Music Art and Dance) event.

Their second studio album, Princess Tabu, was released in August 1996, peaking at No. 30 in Australia. It was co-produced by Vika and Linda with Jeremy Allom and Diesel. It has tracks co-written by the sisters with various collaborators including Barker, Diesel, Kelly, and Tim Finn. Additional musicians used were Barker, Diesel, Stuart Fraser, Bruce Haynes and Stuart Speed. It was recorded in Melbourne, Sydney and in Tonga – where they "paid their respects to the nation's monarch King Taufa'ahu [sic] Tupou". Australian musicologist, Ian McFarlane, felt the album was a "purer reflection of the cultural strains and rich diversity of their heritage". An extended version of Princess Tabu was issued in the following year, which included a bonus live disc – with acoustic versions of earlier material recorded at the Continental Hotel, Prahran.

During the next few years the duo toured and prepared material for a third studio album, Two Wings. In the interim Linda and percussionist Justin Stanford had their first child, as did Vika and Watson. The sisters released their third studio album, Two Wings, in August 1999, a collection of spiritual songs, which McFarlane described as an "inspired song selection ranging from blues and gospel to reggae and soul". It was co-produced by Renée Geyer with Kelly and includes tracks written by Kelly, Roach, Bob Marley and Tim Rogers. The album peaked at No. 34 on the ARIA Albums Chart, and was nominated for 'Best Adult Contemporary Album' at the ARIA Music Awards of 2000.

In November 2000 they released a live album, Live and Acoustic, recorded at the Continental Hotel. It was co-produced by the sisters with Burstin. Australian music journalist, Ed Nimmervoll, declared it to be his Album of the Week, noting that it "brings us back to the start, pure Vika and Linda, just singing together, as they always have and always will, applying all the experience and confidence they've accumulated, more gospel than you might expect". In the following year, Vika and Linda were released by the merged Festival Mushroom Records Vika and Linda now promoted and distributed their new music, although Mushroom still held the rights to their back catalogue.

=== 2002–2017: Love is Mighty Close, Between Two Shores ===
Vika and Linda's fourth studio album, Love is Mighty Close, was released independently in July 2002 using a country-blues style. The 12 tracks were written by Cummings, Kelly, Cyndi Boste, Dan Brodie, Rob Snarski, Chris Wilson, Jeff Burstin, Bill McDonald, Barry Palmer, Caroline Kennedy, Dave McCormack, and David Hosking. The album failed to chart but it was nominated for Best Adult Contemporary Album at the ARIA Music Awards of 2002. Following its release, the sisters focussed on their gospel roots. The backing band's line-up changed, with Burstin replaced on guitar by Dion Hirini. During a three-month residency at the Cornish Arms, Vika and Linda played and recorded gospel tunes; which resulted in their second live album, Tell the Angels, in May 2004.

After the release of Tell the Angels, the sisters took a break from performing as a duo, during which Linda and Stanford had their second child, with Linda spending more time with parenting responsibilities. From November that year they presented six episodes of a TV series, Pacific Stories, on ABC2. Episode 5, "Fit for a King", broadcast on 15 December, detailed the 1994 celebrations where the duo sang for the king of Tonga.

In September 2006, Liberation Blue released Vika and Linda's fifth studio album, Between Two Shores. In December of that year, MGM Distribution re-issued four of their early albums: Vika and Linda, Princess Tabu, Two Wings and Live & Acoustic.

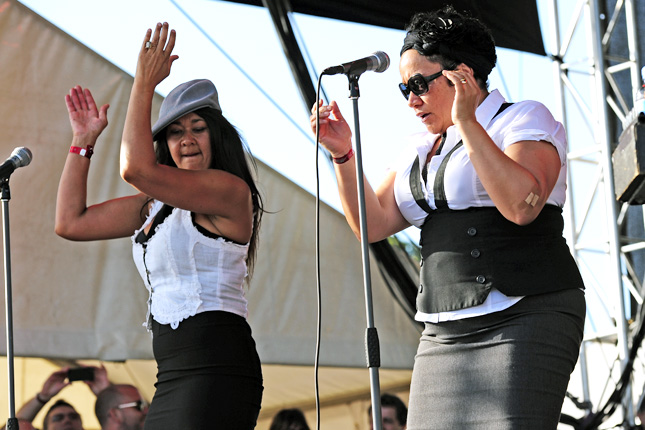
Backing Paul Kelly at Southbound, Busselton, January 2011

During the 2010s, the sisters frequently provided backing vocals for the guest artist on the TV popular music quiz show, RocKwiz. On 3 January 2011, they provided backing vocals for Paul Kelly at Southbound, Busselton, Western Australia.

In 2016, they engaged a new manager, Lisa Palermo, who worked well with them. The first gig she got for them was singing the national anthem at the 2016 AFL Grand Final. on 1 October 2016. Cameron Adams from news.com.au said, "Their majestic harmonies supplied even more goosebumps on a day already charged with emotion. Anyone who has to sing the national anthem at a major sporting event in the future needs to YouTube this as research".

=== 2018–2020: 'Akilotoa and Sunday (The Gospel According to Iso) ===
In July 2018, Vika indicated that the duo are in the process of preparing songs for a new Vika & Linda album (the first album of new material since 2002), that will include songwriting contributions from Paul Kelly, Kasey Chambers, Dan Kelly, and Linda Bull (where Linda is collaborating with Paul Kelly on a few tracks). Vika has indicated that the album will be recorded in February 2019, with an impending release sometime in 2019.

In November 2019, the duo were inducted into the Music Victoria Hall of Fame.

During the COVID-19 pandemic, the duo live streamed a series of singing sessions via Facebook, where they sang songs for their fans.

In May 2020, the duo confirmed the release of their first greatest hits album, titled 'Akilotoa: Anthology (1994-2006), which was released on 12 June 2020 and debuted at number 1 on the ARIA Charts, becoming their first chart topper. In June 2020, the duo confirmed they would record their sixth studio album in July 2020.

On 24 July 2020, the duo announced the release of Sunday (The Gospel According to Iso), a gospel album recorded on Sundays during the COVID-19 pandemic. The album was released in September 2020 and peaked at number 2 on the ARIA Charts.

=== 2021–present: The Wait, Gee Whiz, It's Christmas! and Where Do You Come From? ===
The duo released their first album of original material in 19 years, The Wait, on 17 September 2021. The Wait includes tracks written by Bernard Fanning, Don Walker, Paul Kelly, Kasey Chambers, Augie March's Glenn Richards and the Living End's Chris Cheney, and debuted at number two on the ARIA Albums Chart.

In October 2022, the duo announced their eighth studio album, titled Gee Whiz, It's Christmas!.

In February 2026, the duo released Where Do You Come From? the title track from their ninth studio album. The album peaked at number 1 on the ARIA Australian Album Charts.

At the 2026 ARIA Music Awards they were inducted in the ARIA Hall of Fame.

== Individual projects and other activities ==
In around 2006, the sisters opened a baby shop called Hoochie Coochie in North Fitzroy, but Vika soon left the business as she did not enjoy it. Linda continued until around 2015 or 2016.

Vika played the lead role as Etta James in the hit musical At Last: The Etta James Story, which premiered in 2013, and touring Australia and New Zealand. It returned in February 2016, first playing at the Arts Centre Playhouse, Melbourne, before doing a third season at The Sydney Opera House in July of that year. In 2017 the musical toured the UK, playing to sold-out audiences and good reviews in London, Liverpool, Manchester, and other venues. It was performed at the Cadogan Hall in October 2018.

== Personal life ==
In 1988, Vika met John Watson, drummer in the James Reyne Band. They married and have a daughter. When they were touring as young women, there was a lot of alcohol around, and Vika became addicted. She said she didn't listen to her sister, who was trying to get her to stop: "I was a pain in the arse", and there were many arguments. She finally went completely sober in 2021.

Linda married their manager, Justin Stanford, which turned out to be a bad marriage, and caused friction between the sisters because they "delegat[ed] the control of key aspects of our career to the wrong person". Linda has two daughters from the marriage, which ended.

== Discography ==
=== Studio albums ===
- Vika and Linda (1994)
- Princess Tabu (1996)
- Two Wings (1999)
- Love is Mighty Close (2002)
- Between Two Shores (2006)
- Sunday (The Gospel According to Iso) (2020)
- The Wait (2021)
- Gee Whiz, It's Christmas! (2022)
- Where Do You Come From? (2026)

== Publications ==
- Bull, Vika; Bull, Linda (25 October 2022). No Bull. Affirm Press. ISBN 978-1-922848-26-0.

== Awards and nominations ==
Vika and Linda were awarded the Medal of the Order of Australia in the 2022 Queen's Birthday Honours.

=== AIR Awards ===
The Australian Independent Record Awards (known colloquially as the AIR Awards) is an annual awards night to recognise, promote and celebrate the success of Australia's Independent Music sector.

Year	Nominee / work	Award	Result	Ref.
2021	Sunday (The Gospel According to Iso)	Best Independent Blues and Roots Album or EP	Won	

=== APRA Awards ===
The APRA Awards are held in Australia and New Zealand by the Australasian Performing Right Association to recognise songwriting skills, sales and airplay performance by its members annually.

Year	Nominee / work	Award	Result	Ref.
2023	"My Heart Is in the Wrong Place" (Ben Salter)	Most Performed Blues & Roots Work of the Year	Nominated	

=== ARIA Music Awards ===
The ARIA Music Awards is an annual awards ceremony that recognises excellence, innovation, and achievement across all genres of Australian music. Vika and Linda have been nominated for six awards. They were inducted into the ARIA Hall of Fame in 2026.

Year	Nominee / work	Award	Result
1995	Vika and Linda	Breakthrough Artist – Album	Nominated
1995	"When Will You Fall for Me?"	Breakthrough Artist – Single	Nominated
1997	Princess Tabu	Best Adult Contemporary Album	Nominated
2000	Two Wings	Best Adult Contemporary Album	Nominated
2002	Love is Mighty Close	Best Adult Contemporary Album	Nominated
2022	The Wait	Best Adult Contemporary Album	Nominated
2026	Themselves	ARIA Hall of Fame	inducted
2026	Where Do You Come From?	Best Group	Nominated
2026	Where Do You Come From?	Best Adult Contemporary Album	Nominated

=== Australian Women in Music Awards ===
The Australian Women in Music Awards is an annual event that celebrates outstanding women in the Australian Music Industry who have made significant and lasting contributions in their chosen field. They commenced in 2018.

Year	Nominee / work	Award	Result	Ref.
2019	Vika and Linda	Lifetime Achievement Award	Nominated	
2023	Vika and Linda	Artistic Excellence Award	Won	

=== J Awards ===
The J Awards are an annual series of Australian music awards that were established by the Australian Broadcasting Corporation's youth-focused radio station Triple J. They commenced in 2005.

Year	Nominee / work	Award	Result	Ref.
2026	Vika and Linda	Double J Artist of the Year	Won	

=== Music Victoria Awards ===
The Music Victoria Awards are an annual awards night celebrating Victorian music. They commenced in 2005.

Year	Nominee / work	Award	Result
2019	Vika and Linda	Hall of Fame	inductee

=== Rolling Stone Australia Awards ===
The Rolling Stone Australia Awards are awarded annually in January or February by the Australian edition of Rolling Stone magazine for outstanding contributions to popular culture in the previous year.

Year	Nominee / work	Award	Result	Ref.
2022	Vika and Linda	Rolling Stone Readers' Choice Award	Nominated	
