= Renée Geyer discography =

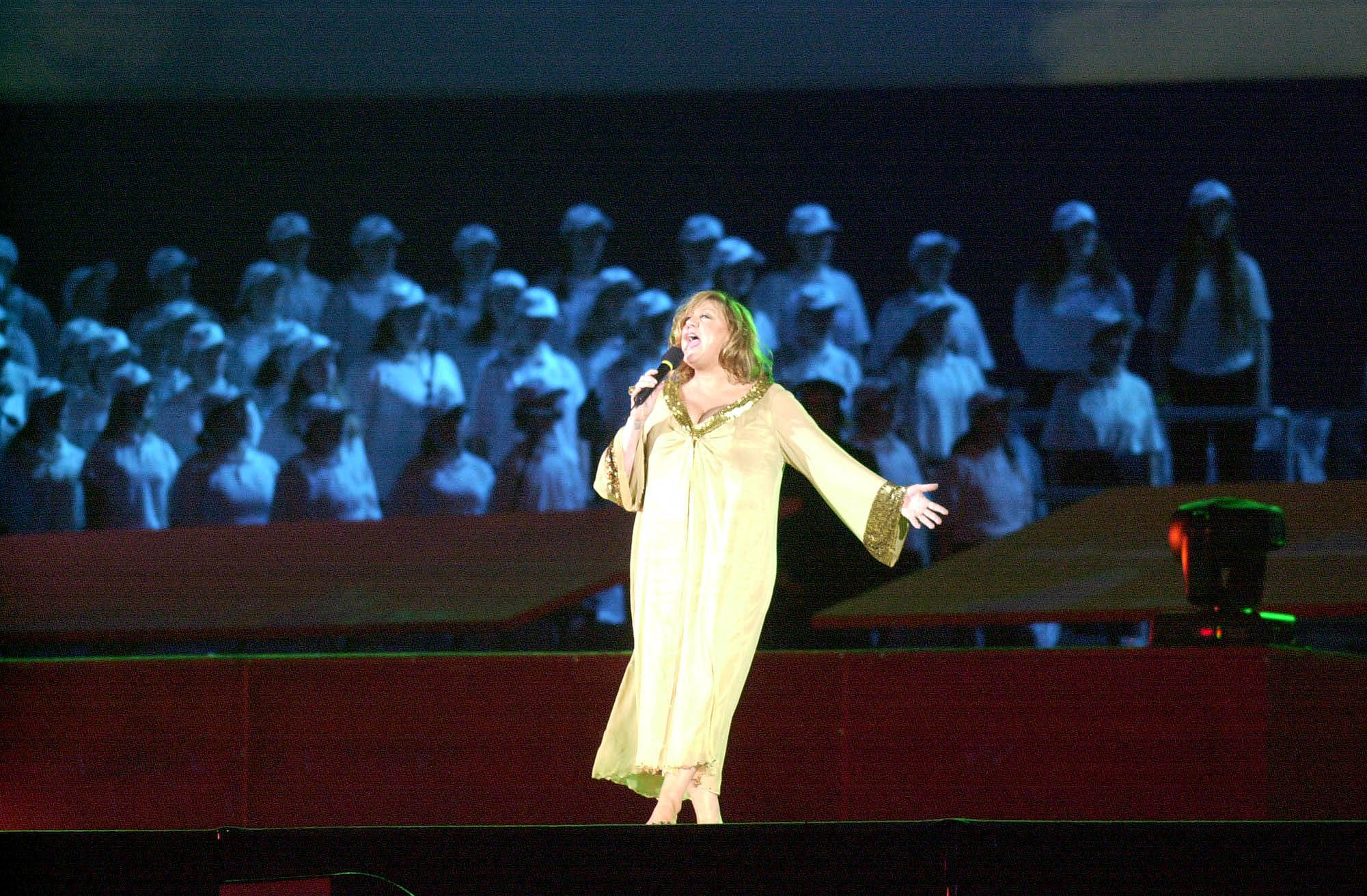
- Geyer at the 2000 Olympics
- Studio albums: 15
- Soundtrack albums: 1
- Live albums: 4
- Compilation albums: 4
- Box sets: 1

The discography of Australian pop and jazz singer-songwriter Renée Geyer. By 1982, Geyer had five albums certified gold in Australia.

== Albums ==
=== Studio albums ===
List of studio albums, with selected details
| Title | Album details | Peak chart positions | | Certifications |
| Title | Album details | AUS | NZ | Certifications |
|---|---|---|---|---|
| Renée Geyer | Released: September 1973; Label: RCA Records | — | — | |
| It's a Man's Man's World | Released: August 1974; Label: RCA Records | 28 | — | |
| Ready to Deal | Released: November 1975; Label: RCA Records | 21 | — | |
| Moving Along | Released: May 1977; Label: RCA Records / Polydor Records (US) | 11 | — | |
| Winner | Released: November 1978; Label: RCA Records | 69 | — | |
| Blues License | Released: June 1979; Label: RCA Records | 41 | — | |
| So Lucky | Released: November 1981; Label: Mushroom Records | 36 | 30 | |
| Sing to Me | Released: June 1985; Label: WEA | 37 | — | |
| Difficult Woman | Released: September 1994; Label: Larrikin Records | 91 | — | |
| Sweet Life | Released: March 1999; Label: Mushroom Records | 50 | — | |
| Tenderland | Released: August 2003; Label: ABC Music / Universal Music Australia | 11 | — | ARIA: Gold |
| Tonight | Released: April 2005; Label: ABC Music | 56 | — | |
| Dedicated | Released: September 2007; Label: Capitol Records | 53 | — | |
| Renéessance | Released: May 2009; Label: Liberation Blue | — | — | |
| Swing | Released: April 2013; Label: FanFare / EMI Music | 22 | — | |
"—" denotes releases that did not chart.

=== Live albums ===
List of live albums, with selected details
| Title | Album details | Peak chart positions |
| Title | Album details | AUS |
|---|---|---|
| Really Really Love You: Live at the Dallas Brooks Hall | Released: August 1976; Label: RCA Records | 23 |
| Renée Live | Released: April 1983; Label: Mushroom Records | 80 |
| Live at the Basement | Released: 1986; Label: ABC Records | — |
| Live at the Athenaeum | Released: 11 April 2004; Label: ABC Records | — |
| Live at the Eureka Hotel 1979 and the Tivoli Sydney 1982 | Released: 8 November 2024; Label: ACRA | — |
"—" denotes releases that did not chart.

=== Compilation albums ===
List of compilation albums, with selected details
| Title | Album details | Peak chart positions | |
| Title | Album details | AUS | NZ |
|---|---|---|---|
| Renée Geyer at Her Very Best | Released: November 1977; Label: RCA Records | 53 | — |
| Faves | Released: November 1983; Label: Mushroom Records | 53 | — |
| The Best of Renee Geyer 1973-1998 | Released: May 1998; Label: Mushroom Records | 53 | 50 |
| The Ultimate Collection | Released: 12 March 2010; Label: Warner Music Australia | — | 21 |
"—" denotes releases that did not chart.

=== Soundtrack albums ===
List of soundtrack albums, with selected details
| Title | Album details | Peak chart positions |
| Title | Album details | AUS |
|---|---|---|
| Seven Deadly Sins (with Paul Kelly, Vika Bull and Deborah Conway) | Released: February 1993; Label: Australian Broadcasting Corporation | 71 |

== Singles ==
=== As lead or featured artist ===
List of singles, with selected chart positions
| Year | Title | Peak chart positions | | Album |
| Year | Title | AUS | NZ | Album |
|---|---|---|---|---|
| 1973 | "Space Captain" / "If Only You Believe" | — | — | Renée Geyer |
| 1973 | "Oh! Boy" / "There's No Such Thing As Love" | — | — | Renée Geyer |
| 1974 | "What Do I Do On Sunday Morning?" | 89 | — | It's a Man's Man's World |
| 1974 | "It's a Man's Man's World" | 44 | — | It's a Man's Man's World |
| 1975 | "Take Me Where You Took Me Last Night" | — | — | It's a Man's Man's World |
| 1975 | "(I Give You) Sweet Love" | — | — | Ready to Deal |
| 1975 | "Heading in the Right Direction" | 31 | — | Ready to Deal |
| 1976 | "If Loving You Is Wrong" | — | — | Ready to Deal |
| 1976 | "Shakey Ground" | — | — | Really Really Love You: Live at the Dallas Brooks Hall |
| 1976 | "Leave My Body Alone" | — | — | —N/a |
| 1977 | "Stares and Whispers" | 17 | — | Moving Along |
| 1977 | "Tender Hooks" | — | — | Moving Along |
| 1977 | "Moving Along" | — | — | Moving Along |
| 1977 | "The Restless Years" | 37 | — | The Restless Years soundtrack |
| 1978 | "Money (That's What I Want)" | 90 | — | Winner |
| 1978 | "Baby Be Mine" | 94 | — | Winner |
| 1979 | "The Thrill is Gone" | — | — | Blues License |
| 1980 | "Hot Minutes" with The Ideals | — | — | —N/a |
| 1981 | "Say I Love You" | 5 | 1 | So Lucky |
| 1981 | "Do You Know What I Mean" | 29 | 29 | So Lucky |
| 1982 | "I Can Feel the Fire" | 60 | — | So Lucky |
| 1982 | "Love So Sweet" | 87 | — | Faves |
| 1983 | "Goin' Back" (with Glenn Shorrock) | 65 | — | Renée Live |
| 1983 | "Trouble in Paradise" | 81 | — | Faves |
| 1984 | "Every Beat of My Heart" (with Jon English) | — | — | Street Hero soundtrack |
| 1985 | "All My Love" | 28 | — | Sing to Me |
| 1985 | "Every Day Of The Week" | 88 | — | Sing to Me |
| 1985 | "Faithful Love" | — | — | Sing to Me |
| 1993 | "Crazy" | 142 | — | Seven Deadly Sins |
| 1993 | "He Can't Decide" (with Paul Kelly, Deborah Conway and Vika Bull) | 112 | — | Seven Deadly Sins |
| 1994 | "Careless" | 169 | — | Difficult Woman |
| 1998 | "Say I Love You" (GROOVE 21/20 featuring Renée Geyer) | — | — | The Best of Renee Geyer 1973-1998 |
| 1998 | "I Need Love" (Paul Main Project featuring Renée) | — | — | —N/a |
| 1998 | "I'm the Woman Who Loves You" | 201 | — | The Best of Renee Geyer 1973-1998 |
| 1999 | "I'm Gonna Make You Love Me" (with CDB) | 92 | — | Sweet Life |
| 2003 | "Morning Glory" | — | — | Tenderland |
| 2004 | "I'm Evil Tonight" | — | — | Tonight |
| 2007 | "I Wish It Would Rain" | — | — | Dedicated |
| 2013 | "Baby, Please Don't Go" | — | — | Swing |
"—" denotes releases that did not chart.

=== Other singles ===
List of singles as featured artist, with selected chart positions
| Year | Title | Peak chart positions |
| Year | Title | AUS |
|---|---|---|
| 1977 | "Rock Around the Clock" (released to commemorate the 21st Anniversary of the release of "Rock Around the Clock") (with Glenn Shorrock, Frankie J. Holden, John Paul Young, Daryl Braithwaite and Graeme Strachan) | — |
| 1985 | "The Garden" (as Australia Too) | 22 |
| 1988 | "You're Not Alone" (as Australian Olympians) | 18 |
| 1998 | "Yil Lull" (as Singers For The Red Black & Gold) | — |

== See also ==
- Sun 1972 by Sun (1972)
- Easy Pieces by Easy Pieces (1988)
