= The Ultimate Collection (Renée Geyer album) =

Greatest hits album by Renée Geyer
- Released: 12 March 2010
- Recorded: 1973–2007
- Genres: Jazz; R&B; soul; pop; funk
- Length: 71:09
- Label: Warner Music Australia
- Producer: various

Renée Geyer chronology
Renéessance (2009)	The Ultimate Collection (2010)	Swing (2013)

The Ultimate Collection (subtitled Celebrating Four Decades of Soul) is the fourth greatest hits album by Australian musician Renée Geyer. It was released in March 2010 by Warner Music Australia and peaked at number 21 on the RIANZ charts, becoming Geyer's highest charting album in New Zealand.

== Background and release ==
Geyer's career has spanned four decades and has achieved commercial success, appearing on the Australian charts since the 1970s to 2000s. The 17 tracks were selected by Geyer. She believes that they are fan favourites and are always requested at live shows. In 2005, Geyer was inducted into the ARIA Hall of Fame.

In a 2011 interview with Bendigo Weekly, Geyer said "People like it (the album) because it's the songs that I know are the most yelled out for me. I know these are the ones that people really want to hear. It's a basic sum-up of my career."

== Reception ==
Julie Taylor from The Northern Advocate gave the album 3 out of 5 saying; "Her best known hit, Eddy Grant's "Say I Love You", is an essential, but somewhat out of place, inclusion in this collection of soulful classics. The more emotionally infused tracks such as "It's a Man's Man's World", "If Loving You Is Wrong" and "Love Don't Live Here Anymore" are artfully performed and wrench, rather than tug, on the heart strings. There are also lighter moments with "Shaky Ground" and a cover of "Prince's "Thieves in the Temple". Geyer has a strong voice and knows how to use it to full effect."

== Track listing ==
No.	Title	Writer(s)	Album	Length
1.	"It's a Man's Man's World"	James Brown, Betty Jean Newsome	It's a Man's Man's World	3:24
2.	"Best Times"	Renée Geyer, Kenneth Crouch	Sweet Life	4:45
3.	"Stares and Whispers"	John Footman, Frank Wilson, Terri McFadden	Moving Along	3:28
4.	"Say I Love You"	Eddy Grant	So Lucky	3:33
5.	"Heading in the Right Direction"	Garry Paige, Mark Punch	Ready to Deal	4:01
6.	"It Only Happens" (with Doug Williams)	Mickey Denne, Ken Gold	Really Really Love You: Live at the Dallas Brooks Hall	4:40
7.	"Sweet Love" (credited to Renée Geyer Band)	Renée Geyer, Mal Logan, Barry Sullivan, Mark Punch, Greg Tell	Ready to Deal	3:21
8.	"If Loving You Is Wrong"	Homer Banks, Carl Hampton, Raymond Jackson	Ready to Deal	4:19
9.	"Shakey Ground"	Jeffrey Bowen, Edward Hazel Al Boyd	Really Really Love You: Live at the Dallas Brooks Hall	4:36
10.	"Baby I've Been Missing You"	Chuck Jackson, Marvin Yancy	So Lucky	3:36
11.	"Thieves in the Temple"	Prince	Tenderland	4:21
12.	"Midnight Train to Georgia"	Jim Weatherly	Tenderland	5:37
13.	"Steal Away"	Jimmy Hughes	Dedicated	3:36
14.	"Difficult Woman"	Paul Kelly	Difficult Woman	4:28
15.	"Love Don't Live Here Anymore"	Miles Gregory	Tenderland	6:45
16.	"God Only Knows"	Brian Wilson, Tony Asher	Difficult Woman	2:03
17.	"Why Can't We Live Together"	Timmy Thomas	Dedicated	4:39

== Weekly charts ==
Chart (2010)	Peak position
New Zealand Albums (RMNZ)	21

== Release history ==
Region	Date	Format	Edition(s)	Label	Catalogue
Australia / New Zealand	12 March 2010	CD; Digital download	standard	Warner Music Australia	5186584252
