= The Best of Renee Geyer 1973–1998 =

Greatest hits album by Renée Geyer
- Released: 11 May 1998
- Recorded: 1973–1998
- Genres: Jazz; R&B; soul; pop; funk
- Length: 70:54 / 114:46
- Label: Mushroom
- Producers: Gus McNeil; Tweed Harris; The Renee Geyer Band; Ernie Rose; Frank Wilson; Rob Fraboni; Martin Armiger; Paul Kelly; Joe Camilleri

Renée Geyer chronology
Difficult Woman (1994)	The Best of Renee Geyer 1973–1998 (1998)	Sweet Life (1999)

Singles from The Best of Renee Geyer 1973-1998
- 1. "Say I Love You (remix)" Released: 1998; 2. "I'm the Woman Who Loves You" Released: June 1998

Alternate cover
- The Definitive Collection (2004)

Professional ratings
Review scores
Source	Rating
AllMusic	4/5 stars

The Best of Renee Geyer 1973–1998 is the third greatest hits album by Australian musician Renée Geyer. It was released in May 1998 by Mushroom Records. The album was re-released in August 2004 under the title The Definitive Collection 1973–1998.

== Track listing ==
Disc 1: The Best of Renée Geyer 1973–1998
No.	Title	Writer(s)	Album	Length
1.	"Oh Boy!"	Eugene Record	Renée Geyer	3:01
2.	"It's a Man's Man's World"	James Brown, Betty Jean Newsome	It's a Man's Man's World	3:24
3.	"Sweet Love" (credited to Renée Geyer Band)	Renée Geyer, Mal Logan, Barry Sullivan, Mark Punch, Greg Tell	Ready to Deal	3:21
4.	"Heading in the Right Direction" (credited to Renée Geyer Band)	Garry Paige, Punch	Ready to Deal	4:02
5.	"I Really Love You" (credited to Renée Geyer Band)	Geyer, Logan, Sullivan, Punch, Tell	Ready to Deal	5:53
6.	"If Loving You Is Wrong" (credited to Renée Geyer Band)	Homer Banks, Carl Hampton, Raymond Jackson	Ready to Deal	4:20
7.	"Shakey Ground" (credited to Renée Geyer Band)	Jeffrey Bowen, Edward Hazel Al Boyd	Really Really Love You: Live at the Dallas Brooks Hall	4:39
8.	"Stares and Whispers"	John Footman, Frank Wilson, Terri McFadden	Moving Along	3:28
9.	"Quicker Than the Eye"	Harry Booker, Judy Wieder	Moving Along	4:07
10.	"Say I Love You"	Eddy Grant	So Lucky	3:33
11.	"I Can Feel the Fire"	Ron Wood	So Lucky	4:16
12.	"Baby I've Been Missing You"	Chuck Jackson, Marvin Yancy	So Lucky	3:36
13.	"Do You Know What I Mean"	Lee Michaels	So Lucky	3:21
14.	"You Don't Know Nothing About Love"	Jerry Ragovoy	So Lucky	3:57
15.	"Crazy"	Willie Nelson	Seven Deadly Sins	4:15
16.	"Foggy Highway"	Paul Kelly	Seven Deadly Sins	3:29
17.	"Difficult Woman"	Kelly	Difficult Woman	4:28
18.	"I'm The Woman Who Loves You"	Geyer, Ross Wilson	The Best of Renee Geyer 1973-1998	3:44

Disc 2: Renéemixed
No.	Title	Writer(s)	Remix	Length
1.	"Say I Love You" (Groove 21/20 featuring Renée Geyer)	Grant	Groove 21/20	3:49
2.	"It's a Man's Man's World" (Drum 'N' Bass Mix)	James Brown, Betty Jean Newsome	Pound System	6:19
3.	"Moving Along" (Bass 'N' Garage Mix)	Geyer, Mal Logan, Barry Sullivan, Judy Wieder	Pound System	5:39
4.	"Booty" (World Mix)	Sylvester Stewart	Don Nadi	5:56
5.	"Sweet Love" (Nuff Z Mix)	Geyer, Logan, Sullivan, Punch, Tell	Pound System	4:46
6.	"Spilt Milk"	Geyer, Logan, Sullivan, Punch, Tell	Michael den Elzen	5:06
7.	"Money" (Dicko & Mastie Remix)	Berry Gordy, Janie Bradford	Greg Dickinson	7:56
8.	"It's a Man's Man's World"	Brown, Betty Jean Newsome	Wicked Beat Sound System	4:21

== Charts ==
Chart (1998)	Peak position
Australian Albums (ARIA)	53
New Zealand Albums (RMNZ)	50

== Release history ==
Region	Date	Format	Edition(s)	Label	Catalogue
Australia	11 May 1998	CD	CD/ 2CD	Mushroom Records	MUSH33083.2
Australia	August 2004	CD	CD	Mushroom Records	337772
