= Faves =

Greatest hits album by Renée Geyer
- Released: November 1983
- Recorded: 1974–1983
- Genre: Jazz; R&B; soul; pop; funk
- Length: 53:58
- Label: Mushroom
- Producer: Various

Renée Geyer chronology
Renée Live (1983)	Faves (1983)	Sing to Me (1985)

Singles from Faves
- 1. "Love So Sweet" Released: July 1982; 2. "Trouble in Paradise" Released: August 1983

Faves is the second greatest hits album by Australian musician Renée Geyer. It was the final release on the Mushroom Records label.

The album includes tracks from all but one of Geyer's albums to date (no tracks from Renée Geyer (1973)). It also includes her 1980 single "Hot Minutes" included on an album for the first time as well as two new tracks.

Initially issued on vinyl, this album was divided into a 'Dance' side and a 'Romance' side.

== Track listing ==
Vinyl/ cassette (L 37659)

Side One (dance)

1. "Say I Love You" (Eddy Grant) - 3:12
2. "Shakey Ground" (Jeffrey Bowen, Edward Hazel, Al Boyd) - 4:30
3. "Hot Minutes" (Renée Geyer, John Capek, Michael Jaye) - 3:04
4. "Money (That's What I Want)" (Berry Gordy, Janie Bradford) - 5:18
5. "Tender Hooks" (Ruth Copeland, Eric Thorngren) - 4:33
6. "Love So Sweet" (Tony Backhouse) - 3:30
7. "Trouble in Paradise" (Renée Geyer, Ricky Fataar) - 4:01

Side Two (romance)

1. "Stares and Whispers" (John Footman, Frank Wilson, Terri McFadden) - 3:22
2. "Ready to Deal" (Renée Geyer Band) - 3:30
3. "It's a Man's Man's Man's World" (James Brown) - 3:24
4. "Heading in the Right Direction" (Mark Punch, Garry Paige) - 3:56
5. "Sweet Love" (Renée Geyer Band) - 3:16
6. "Goin' Back" (live) (with Glenn Shorrock) (Carole King, Gerry Goffin) - 3:59
7. "If Loving You is Wrong" (Homer Banks, Ray Jackson, Carl Jackson) - 4:17

== Charts ==
Weekly chart performance for Faves
Chart (1984)	Peak position
Australian Albums (Kent Music Report)	53
