= Renéessance =

Studio album by Renée Geyer
- Released: 3 May 2009
- Genre: Blues; jazz
- Length: 50:45
- Label: Liberation Blue Records
- Producer: Bruce Haymes, Jeff Burstin, Renée Geyer

Renée Geyer chronology
Dedicated (2007)	Renéessance (2009)	The Ultimate Collection (2010)

Renéessance (subtitled An Acoustic Journey, the Best of Renée Geyer) is the fourteenth studio album by Australian soul and R&B singer Renée Geyer. The album contains newly recorded acoustic versions of songs Geyer has previously recorded in addition to some new material. The album was released in May 2009.

Upon release, Geyer said “I’ve avoided doing this album for a long time for the simple reason that I’ve already done these songs. I finally said yes ’cause we agreed to do it live at my keyboard player’s house: just set up like an acoustic gig and play. People tend to like the intimacy of that. It has a certain energy and I think it works.”; adding, “A lot of these songs were not necessarily that easy to put into an acoustic form, some of them are there because I do them every night and I love them forever, some are on there because they’re important songs in my career. I’m just hoping I did justice to them all.”

Geyer toured the album throughout Australia in June and July 2009.

== Reception ==
Amazon.com said "Renee Geyer had started out a sensual blues belter. Now she has evolved into a bona fide music icon – someone to look up to for never having let go of her dreams. This consummate entertainer with a proud body of work still transfixes a room with the power of her song."

== Track listing ==
1. "Dedicated to the One I Love" (Lowman Pauling, Ralph Bass) – 3:54
2. "Heading in the Right Direction" (Garry Paige, Mark Punch) – 3:48
3. "Say I Love You" (Eddy Grant) – 3:55
4. "Stares and Whispers" (Frank Wilson, John Footman, Terri McFaddin) – 3:20
5. "It Only Happens (When I Look at You)" (Kenneth Gold, Michael Denne) – 4:24
6. "It's Too Late" (Carole King, Toni Stern, Eddie Cornelius) – 5:06
7. "(If Loving You Is Wrong) I Don't Want to Be Right" (Homer Banks, Carl Hampton, Raymond Jackson) – 4:30
8. "Standing on Shaky Ground" (Alphonso Boyd, Edward Hazel, Jeffrey Bowen) – 3:37
9. "Difficult Woman" (Paul Kelly) – 3:53
10. "Baby I've Been Missing You" (Chuck Jackson, Marvin Yancy) – 3:50
11. "It's A Man's Man's Man's World" (Betty Newsmen, James Brown) – 4:3-
12. "Sitting in Limbo" (Plummer Bright, Jimmy Cliff) – 5:58

== Personnel ==
- Jeff Burstin – acoustic guitar
- Bruce Haymes – piano, Hammond organ, percussion
- Renée Geyer – vocals

== Release history ==
Region	Date	Format	Edition(s)	Label	Catalogue
Australia	4 May 2009	CD; digital download	Standard	Liberation Blue Records	BLUE165.2
