= Sing for Me =

Sing for Me may also refer to:

- "Sing for Me" (Christina Aguilera song), a 2012 song by Christina Aguilera
- "Sing for Me" (Andreas Johnson song), a 2006 single by Andreas Johnson

== See also ==
- Sing to Me (disambiguation)
