= He Was Too Good to Me =

1930 song by Rodgers and Hart

Song
- Published: 1930
- Composer(s): Richard Rodgers
- Lyricist(s): Lorenz Hart

"He Was Too Good to Me" is a song with music by Richard Rodgers and lyrics by Lorenz Hart. It was introduced in the tryouts of their 1930 Broadway musical Simple Simon, and was dropped before the show's New York opening. The song has become a jazz standard, and has been recorded by such artists as Eileen Farrell, Natalie Cole, Barry Galbraith, Chet Baker, Thad Jones, Nina Simone, Shirley Horn, Chris Connor, Jeri Southern (When Your Heart's on Fire (1957)) and Carmen McRae (Book of Ballads (1958)).

The song is occasionally sung as "She was too good to me", especially by male singers, including The Vogues on their album Till (1969)

The song was covered by Carly Simon on her album My Romance (1990) and by Bette Midler on her album Some People's Lives also in 1990, as a medley paired with Since You Stayed Here. Australian singer Renée Geyer recorded the song on her album Difficult Woman in 1994. On Midler's version the second verse contains the revised line "I was a queen to him. Who's gonna light my way now?", while Geyer's version reprises the original "I was a queen to him. Who's gonna make me gay now?".

This song, sung by Bob Shane, is featured in The Kingston Trio album called Something Special released in 1962 with orchestral accompaniment which was unusual for the group. This song was also released by Bob Shane, of the Kingston Trio, on his 2008 album "The World Needs a Melody".
