= All My Love =

All My Love may refer to:

== Albums ==
- All My Love, by Cliff Richard (1970)
- All My Love (Peabo Bryson album) (1989)
- All My Love, by American guitarist Esteban (1990)
- All My Love (SS501 album), or the title track (2009)
- All My Love, by Lenny (2013)

== Songs ==
- "All My Love" (Richard Beynon and Zen Freeman song) (2013)
- "All My Love" (Cash Cash song), featuring Conor Maynard (2017)
- "All My Love" (Renée Geyer song) (1985)
- "All My Love" (Major Lazer song), featuring Ariana Grande (2014)
- "All My Love" (Queen Pen song) (1998)
- "All My Love" (Patti Page song) (1950)
- "All My Love", by Park Bo-gum, (2020)
- "All My Love (Solo Tu)", by Cliff Richard (1967)
- "All My Love" (Led Zeppelin song) (1979)
- "All My Love" (Watermät, Becky Hill and Tai song) (2015)
- "All My Love" (Coldplay song) (2024)
- "All My Love", by Joe Ely from Joe Ely (1977)
- "All My Love", by A-Teens from Teen Spirit (2001)
- "All My Love", by Nyanda (2015)
- "All My Love", by Shane Filan from You and Me (2015)
- "All My Love", by London Grammar from Californian Soil (2021)
- "All My Love", by Noah Kahan from Stick Season (2022)
- "All My Love", by Jeff Lynne's ELO from From Out of Nowhere (2019)
- "(You Were Made for) All My Love", by Jackie Wilson (1960)

== Other uses ==
- All My Love (TV series), a 2010 South Korean sitcom

== See also ==
- All My Loving (disambiguation)
- All of My Love (disambiguation)
