= Renée Geyer at Her Very Best =

Compilation album by Renée Geyer
- Released: October 1977
- Recorded: 1973–77
- Genre: Soul; R&B
- Length: 49:31
- Label: RCA/Mushroom
- Producer: Gus McNeil; Tweed Harris; Renée Geyer Band; Ern Rose; Frank Wilson

Renée Geyer chronology
Moving Along (1977)	Renée Geyer at Her Very Best (1977)	Winner (1978)

Renée Geyer at Her Very Best is the first greatest hits album by Australian soul/R&B singer Renée Geyer. The album was released in October 1977 and peaked at number 53 on the Kent Music Report Albums Chart. According to The Canberra Times' reporter, "it features all the Geyer favourites." The artist undertook her Geyer Gold tour of Australia as the country's "lady of soul" prior to travelling to Los Angeles for a series of concerts.

== Track listing ==
Vinyl/ cassette (VPL1-0145)

Side One

1. "Stares and Whispers" (John Footman / Frank Wilson / Terri McFadden) – 3.30
2. "Ready to Deal" (Renée Geyer Band) – 3.30
3. "Moving Along" (Renée Geyer / Mal Logan / Barry Sullivan / Judy Wieder) – 6:10
4. "Be There in the Morning" Renée Geyer / Mal Logan / Barry Sullivan) – 3.49
5. "What Do I Do on Sunday Morning" (Dennis Lambert / Brian Potter) – 3.56
6. "Heading in the Right Direction" (Mark Punch / Garry Paige) – 3.53

Side Two

1. "It's a Man's Man's Man's World" (James Brown) – 3.26
2. "If Loving You Is Wrong" (Homer Banks / Ray Jackson / Carl Jackson) – 4.16
3. "Oh! Boy" (Eugene Record) – 2.56
4. "There's No Such Thing As Love" (Anthony Newley / Ian Fraser) – 3.43
5. "I Really Love You" (Renée Geyer Band) - 5.49
6. "Shakey Ground" (Jeffrey Bowen / Edward Hazel / Al Boyd) - 4.29

== Weekly charts ==
Chart (1977/78)	Peak position
Australian Kent Music Report Albums Chart	53
