= Space and First Takes =

Studio album by Lee Michaels
- Released: 1972
- Genre: Psychedelic rock
- Length: 39:42
- Label: A&M
- Producer: Lee Michaels

Lee Michaels chronology
5th (1971)	Space and First Takes (1972)	Lee Michaels Live (1973)

Singles from Space and First Takes
- 1. "Hold on to Freedom"/"Own Special Way (As Long As)" Released: April 1972

Professional ratings
Review scores
Source	Rating
Allmusic	3/5 stars

Space and First Takes is the sixth album by Lee Michaels and was released in 1972. It reached #78 on the Billboard Top LPs chart. It was the follow-up album to his most successful album, 5th which featured the #6 hit single "Do You Know What I Mean". The album consists of two shorter songs and two extended tracks.

The album featured the single "Hold on to Freedom" which did not chart on Billboard, but reached 104 on Cashbox.

== Track listing ==
All songs written by Lee Michaels except where noted.

1. "Own Special Way (As Long As)" (Joel Christie) – 4:33
2. "First Names" – 13:36
3. "Hold on to Freedom" (Johnny Otis) – 5:02
4. "Space and First Takes" – 16:40

== Personnel ==
=== Musicians ===
- Lee Michaels – lead vocals, organ, piano, guitar
- Drake Levin – guitar
- Joel Christie – bass
- Keith Knudsen – drums

=== Technical ===
- Lee Michaels – producer
- Richard Madrid – engineer
- Henry Lewy – mixing engineer
- Roland Young – art direction

== Charts ==
Chart (1972)	Peak position
US Pop	78
