= Renée Live =

Live album by Renée Geyer
- Released: April 1983
- Recorded: 17–18 December 1982, Tivoli Theatre (Sydney), Australia
- Genre: Rock; R&B; soul; pop
- Length: 38.22
- Label: Mushroom
- Producer: Renée Geyer, Mal Logan, Jim Barton

Renée Geyer chronology
| So Lucky (1981) | Renée Live (1983) | Faves (1983) |

Singles from Renée Live
- 1. "Goin' Back (with Glenn Shorrock)" Released: February 1983

Renée Live is the second live album by Australian musician Renée Geyer. The album was recorded in December 1982 and released in April 1983 by Mushroom Records. The album peaked at number 80 on the Kent Music Report.

== Track listing ==
Vinyl/ cassette (L 37975)

Side one

1. "Intro" (excerpt From "Be Yourself") (Cameo) - 1.08
2. "Look What You've Done" (Leo Nocentelli) - 4.06
3. "Baby I've Been Missing You" (Chuck Jackson, Marvin Yancy) - 4.01
4. "I Got News For You" (Jonathan Zwartz, Jane Lindsay) - 4.55
5. "Say I Love You" (Eddy Grant) - 5.09

Side Two

1. "Goin' Back" (with Glenn Shorrock) (Carole King, Gerry Goffin) - 3.54
2. "You Don't Know What You Mean To Me" (with Venetta Fields) (Eddie Floyd, Steve Cropper) - 3.05
3. "Since I Fell for You" (Buddy Johnson) - 7.04
4. "I Can Feel the Fire" (Ron Wood) - 4.55

== Renée Geyer Band ==
- Renée Geyer - vocals
- Venetta Fields - vocals
- Stuart Fraser - guitars
- Mal Logan - keyboards
- Chris Haig - bass guitar
- Steve Hopes - drums
- Geoff Oakes - saxophone, percussion
- Russell Smith - trumpet, flugle, percussion
- Sunil De Silva - percussion
- Trevor White - backing vocals
- Peter Chambers - backing vocals

== Charts ==
Weekly chart performance for Renée Live
| Chart (1983) | Peak position |
|---|---|
| Australian Albums (Kent Music Report) | 80 |
