= Tonight (Renée Geyer album) =

Studio album by Renée Geyer
- Released: April 2005
- Recorded: 2004–2005
- Studios: Black Box, Brisbane; Sing Sing Studios, Melbourne
- Genres: Funk; soul; pop; R&B
- Length: 41:35
- Label: ABC Music
- Producers: Renée Geyer, Magoo

Renée Geyer chronology
Live at the Athenaeum (2004)	Tonight (2005)	Dedicated (2007)

Singles from Tonight
- 1. "I'm Evil Tonight" Released: March 2005

Tonight is the twelfth studio album by Australian soul and R&B singer Renée Geyer. The album was released in April 2005 and peaked at number 56 on the ARIA Charts.

At the ARIA Music Awards of 2005, the album was nominated for Best Adult Contemporary Album.

== Reception ==
Bernard Zuel from Sydney Morning Herald said; "While holding true to a core of soul and R&B, this album fires off in multiple directions, both modern and rich in history." adding "With the unlikely but inspired choice of producer Magoo (best known for his work with rock acts such as Midnight Oil and Regurgitator) as co-conspirator, Geyer ensures there are clever, subtle but telling moments scattered everywhere."

== Track listing ==
1. "I'm Evil Tonight" (Naomi Neville) – 2:54
2. "Takes a Woman to Know" (Charlie Dore, Terry Britten) – 4:13
3. "Cry One More Time" (Paul Kelly) – 4:55
4. "You Matter" (John Clifforth, Renée Geyer) – 3:57
5. "Love Is a Drug" (Geyer, Vince Pizzinga) – 3:32
6. "Nasty Streak" (Dan Kelly) – 5:03
7. "Go Ahead & Cry" (Margaret Ann Rich) – 3:49
8. "Gutless Wonder" (Paul Kelly) – 4:26
9. "He Loves Me Not" (Frank Jones) – 3:29
10. "Lost in Space" (Claire Moore) – 5:18

== Charts ==
=== Weekly charts ===
Chart (2005)	Peak position
Australian Albums (ARIA)	56

=== Year-end charts ===
Chart (2005)	Rank
Australian Jazz & Blues Chart (ARIA)	20

== Release history ==
Region	Date	Format	Edition(s)	Label	Catalogue
Australia	April 2005	CD; digital download	Standard	ABC Music	14352
