= Barrel (album) =

Studio album by Lee Michaels
- Released: 1970
- Recorded: 1970
- Studios: Lee Michaels' Record Ranch Inc, Mill Valley, CA
- Genre: Psychedelic rock
- Length: 34:23
- Label: A&M
- Producer: Larry Marks

Lee Michaels chronology
Lee Michaels (1969)	Barrel (1970)	5th (1971)

Singles from Barrel
- 1. "What Now America"/"Uummmm My Lady" Released: September 1970

Professional ratings
Review scores
Source	Rating
Allmusic	2.5/5 stars

Barrel is the fourth album by Lee Michaels and was released in 1970. It reached #51 on the Billboard Top LPs chart. Former Paul Revere & the Raiders' guitarist Drake Levin played guitar on the album. The album featured a cover of Moby Grape's "Murder in My Heart (For the Judge)."

The album featured the single "What Now America" which did not chart on the Billboard single's chart.

== Track listing ==
All songs written by Lee Michaels except where noted.

1. "Mad Dog" (Michaels/Sheffield/Eddie Shuler) – 3:44
2. "What Now America" – 3:25
3. "Uummmm My Lady" – 3:00
4. "Thumbs" – 4:05
5. "When Johnny Comes Marching Home" (Louis Lambert) – 2:04
6. "Murder in My Heart (For the Judge)" (Jerry Miller/Don Stevenson) – 3:36
7. "Day of Change" – 3:32
8. "Think I'll Cry" – 2:42
9. "Games" (Bobby Womack) – 3:09
10. "Didn't Know What I Had" – 3:12
11. "As Long as I Can" – 1:27

== Personnel ==
=== Musicians ===
- Lee Michaels – lead vocals, piano, Hammond organ
- Drake Levin – guitar
- Barry "Frosty" Smith – drums

=== Technical ===
- Larry Marks – producer
- Tom Wilkes – art direction, photography
- Chuck Beeson – art direction
- Jim McCrary – photography

== Charts ==
Chart (1970)	Peak position
US Pop	51
