= 5th (Lee Michaels album) =

Studio album by Lee Michaels
- Released: 1971
- Genre: Rock
- Length: 27:31
- Label: A&M
- Producer: Lee Michaels

Lee Michaels chronology
Barrel (1970)	5th (1971)	Space and First Takes (1972)

Singles from 5th
- 1. "Do You Know What I Mean"/"Keep the Circle Turning" Released: May 1971; 2. "Can I Get a Witness"/"You Are What You Do" Released: October 1971; 3. "Rock Me Baby"/"Heighty Hi" Released: June 1973

Professional ratings
Review scores
Source	Rating
Allmusic	3/5 stars

5th is the fifth album by Lee Michaels and was released in 1971. It reached #16 on the Billboard Top LPs chart.

The album featured three singles: "Do You Know What I Mean", which reached #6 on the Billboard Hot 100, "Can I Get a Witness", which reached #39 on the Billboard Hot 100, and "Rock Me Baby" which did not chart. The album's title is a reference to "Can I Get a Witness"; the Fifth Amendment to the United States Constitution deals with the rights of witnesses to refuse to give testimony that will incriminate themselves.

== Track listing ==
All songs written by Lee Michaels except where noted.

1. "Keep the Circle Turning" (featuring Merry Clayton) (Joel Christie) – 2:41
2. "You Are What You Do" - 2:58
3. "Willie & the Hand Jive" (Johnny Otis) - 3:02
4. "Didn't Have to Happen" - 2:32
5. "Rock Me Baby" (Riley King/Joe Josea) - 2:28
6. "Do You Know What I Mean" - 3:11
7. "Ya Ya" (Lee Dorsey/Clarence Lewis/Morgan Robinson/Morris Levy) - 2:19
8. "Can I Get a Witness" (Brian Holland/Lamont Dozier/Eddie Holland) – 3:02
9. "Oak Fire" – 2:53
10. "I Don't Want Her" – 2:25

== Personnel ==
=== Musicians ===
- Lee Michaels – lead vocals, organ, piano
- Jackie Kelso – saxophone
- Joel Larson – drums

=== Technical ===
- Lee Michaels – producer
- Henry Lewy, Norm Kinney, Richard Madrid – engineers
- Roland Young – art direction
- Jim McCrary – photography

== Charts ==
Chart (1971)	Peak position
Australia (Kent Music Report)	38
Canada Top Albums/CDs (RPM)	28
US Billboard 200	16

Singles

Year	Single	Chart	Position
1971	"Do You Know What I Mean"	US Pop	6
1971	"Can I Get a Witness"	US Pop	39
