= Lee Michaels (album) =

Studio album by Lee Michaels
- Released: 1969
- Recorded: June 2, 1969
- Genre: Psychedelic rock
- Length: 38:23
- Label: A&M
- Producer: Larry Marks

Lee Michaels chronology
Recital (1968)	Lee Michaels (1969)	Barrel (1970)

Singles from Lee Michaels
- 1. "Heighty Hi"/"Want My Baby" Released: July 1969

Professional ratings
Review scores
Source	Rating
Allmusic	4.5/5 stars
Robert Christgau	C

Lee Michaels is the third album by Lee Michaels and was released in 1969. It reached #53 on the Billboard Top LPs chart. The album was recorded live in studio with only Michaels playing the organ and bass pedals and Barry "Frosty" Smith on drums. The first side (tracks 1–5) consists of a medley of songs. The song "My Friends" was originally featured on his first album, Carnival of Life and was re-released on this album.

The album featured the single "Heighty Hi" which reached #106 on the Billboard singles chart.

== Track listing ==
All songs written by Lee Michaels except where noted.

1. "Tell Me How Do You Feel" (Percy Mayfield/Ray Charles) – 20:28
2. "(Don't Want No) Woman"
3. "My Friends"
4. "Frosty's" (Barry "Frosty" Smith)
5. "Think I'll Go Back"
6. "Stormy Monday" (T-Bone Walker) – 5:10
7. "Who Could Want More" – 3:42
8. "Want My Baby" – 2:58
9. "Heighty Hi" – 5:57

== Personnel ==
=== Musicians ===
- Lee Michaels – lead vocals, organ, bass
- Barry "Frosty" Smith – percussion

=== Technical ===
- Larry Marks – producer
- Tom Wilkes – art direction
- Jim McCrary – photography (front cover)
- Robert Black – photography (back cover)

== Charts ==
Chart (1969)	Peak position
US Pop	53

Singles

Year	Single	Chart	Position
1969	"Heighty Hi"	US Pop	106
