= Sing to Me =

Sing to Me may refer to:

- Sing to Me (album), a 1985 album by Renée Geyer
- "Sing to Me" (song), a 2014 song by Kate Miller-Heidke
- Sing to Me, a song by Missio, from the soundtrack album Death Stranding: Timefall
- Sing to Me, a song by Jhené Aiko, from the album Trip
