= Swing (Renée Geyer album) =

Studio album by Renée Geyer
- Released: 19 April 2013
- Genre: Big band; blues; jazz; R&B; soul
- Length: 45:07
- Label: FanFare Records
- Producer: David Palmer, Paul Williamson, Renée Geyer

Renée Geyer chronology
The Ultimate Collection (2010)	Swing (2013)

Swing is the fifteenth and final studio album by Australian soul and R&B singer Renée Geyer. The album was released on 19 April 2013 and peaked at number 22 on the ARIA Charts.

Swing is Geyer's big band interpretation of classics as well as remakes of two of her own hits, "Say I Love You" and "It's a Man's Man's Man's World". Geyer told The Sydney Morning Herald that Swing was inspired by Frank Sinatra's 1966 recording with Count Basie in Las Vegas, an album she had long admired. It took the success of Michael Buble to convince her that she should lend her distinctive voice to a big-band album.

Geyer toured the album across 2013. At the 2013 ARIA Music Awards, the album was nominated for Best Jazz Album, losing to Smile by the Idea Of North.

== Track listing ==
1. "Baby. Please Don't Go" (Joe Williams) - 2:55
2. "I Got Rhythm" (George Gershwin, Ira Gershwin) - 3:37
3. "I Wanna Be Around" (Johnny Mercer, Sadie Vimmerstedt) - 2:19
4. "Fly Me to the Moon" (Bart Howard) - 2:54
5. "Comin' Home Baby" (with Paul Kelly) (Ben Tucker, Bob Dorough) - 3:28
6. "Alfie" (Burt Bacharach, Hal David) - 3:46
7. "Say I Love You" (Eddy Grant) - 4:11
8. "What a Wonderful World" (Bob Thiele, George David Weiss) - 5:24
9. "My Funny Valentine" (Richard Rodgers, Lorenz Hart) - 5:12
10. "Somewhere" (Leonard Bernstein, Stephen Sondheim) - 5:28
11. "It's a Man's Man's World" (Betty Jean Newsome, James Brown) - 5:57

== Personnel ==
- Philip Rex - acoustic bass
- Julien Wilson - alto saxophone, clarinet, bass clarinet
- Lachlan Davidson - alto saxophone, flute
- Tim Wilson - alto saxophone, flute
- Paul Williamson - baritone saxophone, tenor saxophone, clarinet
- David Beck - drums, percussion
- Bruce Haymes - electric piano, organ [Hammond]
- Lachlan Davidson - flute
- Sam Lemann - guitar
- Sam Keevers - piano
- Carlo Barbaro - tenor saxophone, clarinet
- David Palmer - trombone
- Jordan Murray - trombone
- Nick Mulder - trombone
- Simon Scerri - trombone [bass]
- Eamon McNelis - trumpet
- Gianni Marinucci - trumpet
- Greg Spence - trumpet
- Ross Irwin - trumpet
- Scott Tinkler - trumpet

== Reception ==
Professional ratings
Review scores
Source	Rating
Herald Sun	4/5 stars

Robert Rigby from FanFare Records said that "The album is a collection of wonderful songs delivered by Renee in a tour de force. On this record she had a great deal especially with her great friend Paul Kelly on a classic Mel Torme song "Comin' Home Baby"."

Cameron Adams from the Herald Sun wrote that "Timeless songs delivered by a timeless voice - sometimes it's that easy. Australian national treasure Renée Geyer is completely at home in front of a big band, joyfully losing herself in standards. Her mate Paul Kelly shows he can even pull off jazz duetting on the Mel Torme hit "Comin' Home Baby". Geyer also uses the opportunity to revisit some of her biggest hits, "Say I Love You" is injected with a Latin carnival feel that is infectious, while after all the times she's sung it she still causes instant goosebumps on "It's a Man's Man's Man's World"." adding that "[it is] the kind of album they used to make".

== Charts ==
=== Weekly charts ===
Chart (2013)	Peak position
Australian Albums (ARIA)	22

=== Year-end charts ===
Chart (2013)	Rank
Australian Jazz and Blues Album Chart	4

== Release history ==
Region	Date	Format	Edition(s)	Label	Catalogue
Australia	19 April 2013	CD; digital download	Standard	FanFare Records	FANFARE098
