= All of My Love =

All of My Love may refer to:

- All of My Love (The Gap Band song)
- All of My Love (Destiny Chukunyere song)

== See also ==
- All My Love (disambiguation)
