= All My Loving (disambiguation) =

"All My Loving" is a 1963 song by English rock band The Beatles.

All My Loving may also refer to:

- All My Loving (EP), a 1964 EP by the Beatles
- "All My Loving"/"Koibito", a 1993 song by Masaharu Fukuyama
- All My Loving (film), a 2019 German drama film
- All My Loving, a 1968 TV documentary by Tony Palmer
- "All My Loving", a 2022 song by Sam Fischer

== See also ==
- All My Love (disambiguation)
