= Can I Get a Witness =

1963 single by Marvin Gaye

Single by Marvin Gaye

from the album Greatest Hits
- B-side: "I'm Crazy 'bout My Baby"
- Released: September 20, 1963
- Recorded: July 17, 1963; Hitsville U.S.A. (Detroit, Michigan)
- Genre: Rhythm and blues, soul, rock and roll
- Length: 2:53
- Label: Tamla; T 54087
- Songwriter: Holland–Dozier–Holland
- Producers: Brian Holland, Lamont Dozier

Marvin Gaye singles chronology
"Pride and Joy" (1963)	"Can I Get a Witness" (1963)	"You're a Wonderful One" (1964)

Official audio
- "Can I Get a Witness" on YouTube

"Can I Get a Witness" is a song composed by Brian Holland, Lamont Dozier, and Eddie Holland and produced by Brian Holland and Lamont Dozier as a non-album single for American recording vocalist Marvin Gaye, who issued the record on Motown's Tamla imprint in September 1963.

== Recording ==
Recorded at Motown's Hitsville U.S.A. studios on July 17, 1963, the song's lyrical writer Eddie Holland discussed going over the song once with Gaye, who had complained to the producers about singing their songs above his vocal range, something he would later complain about during recording sessions for his rendition of "I Heard It Through the Grapevine".

According to Holland, once Gaye heard Holland perform the song to him, he nodded and stated, "okay I'm ready" to a perplexed Holland, who often had to work over the song a few times with other artists who recorded their songs. According to Holland, Gaye recorded the song in one take, which impressed Holland, his brother and Dozier. Holland would later call Gaye "the most versatile vocalist I ever worked with."

On the song, backed by a boogie woogie-styled piano riff played by Funk Brothers pianist Earl Van Dyke, Gaye performs the song in a gospel harmony with members of The Supremes and Holland-Dozier-Holland backing him up on background vocals. Gaye performs the song mostly in a tenor range but occasionally sings in both the baritone and falsetto ranges.

== Release ==
Released in September 1963 as the follow-up to Gaye's top ten hit, "Pride and Joy", the song peaked at No. 22 on the Hot 100 on 28 December 1963 and also became one of Gaye's earlier international hit singles, making a buzz in the United Kingdom, primarily among dance clubs in London and northern England (particularly Leeds), and also charted in France where it peaked at number 29 on its chart. At 16 weeks, "Can I Get a Witness" lasted longer than any other Marvin Gaye entry on the Hot 100 during the 1960s. Gaye performed the song live at the T.A.M.I. Show and lip-synching the song while appearing on the Hollywood A Go-Go in 1964 and also on the BBC show, Ready, Steady, Go! in 1965. In 2021, Rolling Stone ranked it 68th place among its list of the "100 Greatest Motown Songs", calling it "arguably Gaye's first classic hit".

== Sam Brown version ==
"Can I Get a Witness"

Single by Sam Brown

from the album Stop!
- B-side: "Walkin' After Midnight"
- Released: 1988
- Studio: The Power Plant (London)
- Genre: Pop: blue-eyed soul; jazz; rhythm and blues; pop rock
- Length: 2:50
- Label: A&M
- Songwriters: Eddie Holland; Lamont Dozier; Brian Holland
- Producer: Pete Smith

Sam Brown singles chronology
"This Feeling " (1988)	"Can I Get a Witness" (1988)	"With a Little Love" (1990)

In 1988, English singer Sam Brown recorded a cover of "Can I Get a Witness" as a bonus track for the CD release of her debut album, Stop!. The track was released as a single, hitting the Top 10 in New Zealand and Top 20 in the UK, Ireland and Australia.

In their review, Music & Media called the single "excellent" noting that "a gutsy vocal performance from Brown breathes new life into this 60's soul classic."

=== Charts ===
==== Weekly charts ====
Chart (1989)	Peak position
Australia (ARIA)	17
Europe (Eurochart Hot 100)	51
European Airplay (European Hit Radio)	33
Ireland (IRMA)	15
Italy Airplay (Music & Media)	8
Luxembourg (Radio Luxembourg)	15
New Zealand (Recorded Music NZ)	9
UK Singles (OCC)	15

== Covers and later versions ==
"Can I Get a Witness" was notably covered by the Rolling Stones on their first album, The Rolling Stones, in 1964. The Stones also recorded a self-composed instrumental sequel called "Now I've Got a Witness" on that same album.

Dusty Springfield also recorded a version in 1964 for her second EP Dusty on Philips.

Stevie Wonder recorded a version of the song for his album I Was Made to Love Her, released in 1967.

Checkmates, Ltd. released a version of the song as part of a medley on their 1967 debut album, Live! At Caesar's Palace.

The Buckinghams recorded a version on their 1968 album In One Ear and Gone Tomorrow.

The Supremes, who appeared as background vocalists on Marvin Gaye's original, later recorded a version in 1966; however, their version remained unreleased until 1987.

Elton John performed the song at Bob Geldof's Live Aid Concert on July 13, 1985.

Lee Michaels followed up "Do You Know What I Mean" with his version of "Can I Get a Witness", which peaked at number 39 on Christmas Day 1971, eight years to the week after Gaye's version peaked at number 22. His version used organ chords that were similar to his previous hit "Do You Know What I Mean". It was featured on his 1971 album, 5th.

== Personnel ==
- Lead vocals by Marvin Gaye
- Background vocals by Holland–Dozier–Holland (Brian Holland, Lamont Dozier, and Eddie Holland) and the Supremes (Diana Ross, Florence Ballard, and Mary Wilson)
- Instrumentation by the Funk Brothers
  - Baritone saxophone – Eugene Moore
  - Bass – Clarence Isabel
  - Drums – Benny Benjamin
  - Guitar – Eddie Willis
  - Organ – George Fowler
  - Piano – Johnny Griffith
  - Tenor saxophone – Hank Cosby
  - Trombone – Patrick Lanier, Paul Riser
  - Trumpet – Marcus Belgrave, Russell Conway
