= Live at the Athenaeum =

Live album by Renée Geyer
- Released: 11 April 2004
- Recorded: 1 November 2003
- Venues: Melbourne Athenaeum, Victoria, Australia
- Genres: Blues; rock; R&B; pop rock
- Length: 79:32
- Labels: ABC Music, Universal Music Australia
- Producer: Renée Geyer

Renée Geyer chronology
Tenderland (2003)	Live at the Athenaeum (2004)	Dedicated (2007)

Live at the Athenaeum is the fourth live album by Australian musician Renée Geyer. The album was recorded at the Melbourne Athenaeum on 1 November 2003, during her Tenderland tour. The album was released in April 2004 and included as a bonus disc on a special edition of the album, Tenderland.

"Really Really Love You" and "Thieves in the Temple" received airplay on Triple J in August 2004.

== Track listing ==
1. "Really, Really Love You" (Renée Geyer Band) – 5:46
2. "Thieves in the Temple" (Prince) – 4:45
3. "Morning Glory" (Bobbie Gentry) – 4:30
4. "Midnight Train to Georgia" (Jim Weatherly) – 5:42
5. "Peace and Understanding" – 10:07
6. "Nasty Streak" (Dan Kelly) – 7:27
7. "Killer Lover" (Paul Kelly) – 6:01
8. "Close to You" (Burt Bacharach, Hal David) – 4:57
9. "Love Don't Live Here Anymore (Miles Gregory) – 9:08
10. "It's a Man's Man's Man's World" (James Brown, Betty Jean Newsome) – 9:06
11. "Sitting in Limbo" (Guilly Bright, Jimmy Cliff) – 6:40
12. "Heading in the Right Direction" (Garry Paige, Mark Punch) – 5:27

== Release history ==
Region	Date	Format	Edition(s)	Label	Catalogue
Australia	11 April 2004	CD	Standard	ABC Music / Universal Music Australia	13702
