= Blues License =

Blues Licence

Studio album by Renée Geyer
- Released: June 1979
- Recorded: 1979
- Studio: Trafalgar Studios, Melbourne, Australia
- Genre: Jazz; funk; soul; blues; pop
- Length: 40.08
- Label: RCA Records/ Mushroom Records
- Producer: Mal Logan & Renée Geyer

Renée Geyer chronology
Winner (1978)	Blues Licence (1979)	So Lucky (1981)

Singles from Blues Licence
- 1. "The Thrill is Gone" Released: June 1979

Blues License is the sixth studio album by Australian musician Renée Geyer. The album was released in June 1979 and peaked at number 41 on the Kent Music Report.

== Track listing ==
Vinyl/ cassette (VPL1–0214)

Side One

1. "The Thrill Is Gone" (Rick Darnell, Roy Hawkins) – 6.55
2. "That Did It Babe" (Pearl Woods) – 5.15
3. "Set Me Free" (Deadric Malone) – 4.08
4. "Bellhop Blues" (Kevin Borich) – 3.23

Side Two

1. "Won't Be Long" (J. Leslie McFarland) – 3.48
2. "Stormy Monday" (Aaron "T-Bone" Walker) – 6.43
3. "Dust My Blues" (Elmore James) – 3.03
4. "Feeling Is Believing" (Willie Henderson, Richard Parker) – 7.01

== Credits ==
- Renée Geyer: vocals, backing vocals
- Mal Logan: keyboards
- Kevin Borich: guitar ("The Thrill Is Gone", "Set Me Free", "Bellhop Blues", "Stormy Monday", "Feeling Is Believing")
- Tim Partridge: bass guitar (All tracks)
- John Annas: drums (All except "Won't Be Long")
- Kerrie Biddell: backing vocals ("Won't Be Long", "Feeling is Believing")
- Tim Piper: guitar ("That Did It Babe", "Dust My Blues")
- Mark Punch: guitar ("Won't Be Long")
- Steve Hopes: drums ("Won't Be Long")
- Ron King: harmonica ("Dust My Blues")

== Charts ==
Weekly chart performance for Blues License
Chart (1979)	Peak position
Australian Albums (Kent Music Report)	41
