= Live at the Basement (Renée Geyer album) =

Live album by Renée Geyer
- Released: 1986
- Recorded: 12 May 1986
- Venue: The Basement, Sydney Australia
- Genre: Blues; rock; R&B; pop rock
- Label: ABC Records
- Producer: David Hayes, Tim Brooke-Hunt

Renée Geyer chronology
Sing to Me (1985)	Live at the Basement (1986)	Seven Deadly Sins (1993)

Live at the Basement is the third live album by Australian musician Renée Geyer. The album was recorded in May 1986 and released by ABC Records.

The album was recorded as Geyer's Australian 'farewell', as she boarded a plane to the United States within 12 hours of recording the album.

At the ARIA Music Awards of 1987, the album earned Geyer a nomination for Best Female Artist, losing out to Jenny Morris.

== Track listing ==
Vinyl/ cassette (L 38593)

Side one

1. "Sitting on the Dock of the Bay" (Otis Redding, Steve Cropper) – 5:04
2. "Baby, I've Been Missing You" (Chuck Jackson, Marvin Yancy) (4:20)
3. "I've Got You, I Feel Good" (James Brown) – 4:51
4. "It's a Man's, Man's, Man's World" (Betty Newsome, James Brown) – 7:11

Side two

1. "Peace and Understanding Is Hard to Find" (Autry DeWalt, Ronald Harville) – 5:40
2. "Who Was That Girl" (Al Saxon, Dave Carey) – 5:48
3. "If You Leave Me, I'll Go Crazy" (James Brown) – 3:22
4. "Release Yourself" (Marc Jordan) – 8:02

== Personnel ==
- Renée Geyer – vocals
- Mark Williams – backing vocals
- Andy Thompson – saxophone
- Harry Brus – bass
- John Watson – drums
- Steve Housden – guitar
- Jamie McKinley – keyboards
- Andy Thompson – saxophone
- Geoff Oakes – saxophone
- Mike Bukovsky – trumpet
