= Winner (Renée Geyer album) =

Studio album by Renée Geyer
- Released: November 1978
- Recorded: 1978
- Studio: Crystal Sound, Los Angeles, California
- Genre: Funk; pop; soul
- Length: 44:57
- Label: RCA/Mushroom
- Producer: Frank Wilson

Renée Geyer chronology
Renée Geyer at Her Very Best (1977)	Winner (1978)	Blues License (1979)

Singles from Winner
- 1. "Money (That's What I Want)" Released: April 1978; 2. "Baby Be Mine" Released: October 1978

Winner is the fifth studio album by Australian soul and R&B singer, Renée Geyer. It was released in November 1978 and peaked at number 69 on the Kent Music Report. Geyer recorded it in Los Angeles with Frank Wilson producing and was joined by her backing band of Tim Partridge on bass guitar, Mark Punch on guitar and backing vocals, and Greg Tell on drums together with session musicians. Two singles were provided from the album, "Money (That's What I Want)" (April 1978) and "Baby Be Mine" (October).

In her autobiography, released in 2000, Geyer wrote she was unhappy with the mixing of Winner and the lack of support from her American label, Polydor Records. She negotiated a release from her contract, brought the album tapes back to Australia where it was remixed and released. Geyer referred to the album as "a bit of a loser".

== Track listing ==
Vinyl/ cassette (VPL1-0164)

Side One

1. "Money (That's What I Want)" (Berry Gordy, Janie Bradford) - 5.19
2. "I Miss You" (Melvin Robinson, Judy Wieder) - 4.50
3. "Save Me" (Mark Punch, Garry Paige) - 4.13
4. "Baby I'm the One" (Dee Erwin, Alexandra Brown) - 4.36
5. "Baby Be Mine" (Jean McClain) - 3.46

Side Two

1. "Sweet Kisses" (Mark Punch) - 6.28
2. "The Magic is Still There" (Punch, Paige) - 3.58
3. "Bad Side of the Blues" (John Finley, Katherine Ornelas) - 4.03
4. "Apartment C & D" (John Footman, Judy Wieder, Ron Cederlund) - 3.54
5. "I Don't Wanna Lose a Good Thing" (Jack Allen, Shelby Flint) - 3.50

== Personnel ==
Renée Geyer Band

- Renée Geyer – vocals, backing vocals
- Mark Punch – guitar
- Tim Partridge – bass guitar
- Greg Tell – drums
- Melvin Robinson – guitars
- Nate Morgan – piano, clavinet, synthesizer
- Michael Boddicker – synthesizer
- Neil Larsen – keyboard (tracks: 1, 5)
- Ernie Watts – saxophone
- Tower Of Power Horns – horns (tracks 3, 5, 7)
- Jack Ashford – percussion
- Frederick Lewis – percussion

== Charts ==
Weekly chart performance for Winner
Chart (1978–1979)	Peak position
Australian Albums (Kent Music Report)	69
