= So Lucky (Renée Geyer album) =

Studio album by Renée Geyer
- Released: November 6, 1981
- Recorded: 1980−81
- Studio: Shangri-La Studios, Malibu, California
- Genre: Funk; pop; post-disco; soul; synth-pop; rock
- Length: 38.44
- Label: Mushroom / Portrait (US)
- Producer: Rob Fraboni, Ricky Fataar

Renée Geyer chronology
Blues License (1979)	So Lucky (1981)	Renée Live (1982)

Singles from So Lucky
- 1. "Say I Love You" Released: May 1981; 2. "Do You Know What I Mean" Released: October 1981; 3. "I Can Feel the Fire" Released: February 1982

Alternative cover
- US edition

So Lucky is the seventh studio album by Australian musician Renée Geyer. The album was released in November 1981 and includes Geyer's highest charting single "Say I Love You" which peaked at number 5 in Australia and number 1 in New Zealand.

The album was released by Portrait Records in the United States of America in 1982 under the title Reneé Geyer. The songs were re-ordered. It was her second album released in that territory following the Polydor Records' Moving Along in 1977, which was also titled Reneé Geyer.

== Track listing ==
Vinyl/ cassette (L 37554)

Side One

1. "Do You Know What I Mean" (Lee Michaels) - 3.20
2. "Baby I've Been Missing You" (Chuck Jackson, Marvin Yancy) - 3.36
3. "Say I Love You" (Eddy Grant) - 3.33
4. "Come On" (Chuck Berry) - 2.39
5. "You Don't Know Nothing About Love" (Jerry Ragovoy) - 3.56

Side Two

1. "I Can Feel the Fire" (Ron Wood) - 4.15
2. "Good Lovin'" (Renée Geyer, Ricky Fataar, Ian McLaglan, Johnny Lee Schell, Ray O'Hara) - 3.36
3. "Everything Good is Bad" (Norman Johnson, Angelo Bond, Greg Perry) - 4.21
4. "So Lucky" (Renée Geyer, Ricky Fataar) - 3.42
5. "On Your Way Down" (Allen Toussaint) - 5.41

== Personnel ==
- Renée Geyer – vocals, backing vocals
- Johnny Lee Schell – guitars, piano, vocals
- Ian McLaglan – keyboards, vocals
- Ray O'Hara – bass guitar, vocals
- Ricky Fataar – drums, percussion, vocals, keyboards
- William Smith – organ, vocals
- Geoff Hales – percussion
- Bobby Keys – saxophone, vocals
- Blondie Chaplin – vocals
- James Ingram – vocals
- Venetta Fields – vocals

== Charts ==
Weekly chart performance for So Lucky
Chart (1981–1982)	Peak position
Australian Albums (Kent Music Report)	36
New Zealand Albums (RIANZ)	30
