= Tenderland =

Studio album by Renée Geyer
- Released: August 2003
- Studios: Woodstock Studios, Melbourne
- Genres: Funk; soul
- Length: 51:31
- Label: ABC / Universal Music Australia
- Producer: Renée Geyer

Renée Geyer chronology
Sweet Life (1999)	Tenderland (2003)	Live at the Athenaeum (2004)

Alternative cover
- Special edition

Tenderland is the eleventh studio album by Australian soul and R&B singer Renée Geyer. The album was released in August 2003 and peaked at number 11 on the ARIA Charts. It is described as Geyer's "interpretation of a special collection of classic soul, funk and R&B songs".

In 2007 Geyer said "Tenderland was the first time I finally agreed to do interpretations of existing soul classics. I've always dabbled and had the odd one or two on albums, but I'd never before wanted to make a record totally like that. After being asked to for so many years I finally did it when I turned 50. I thought, if ever there was a time to do it, now was the time."

At the ARIA Music Awards of 2003, the album was nominated for Best Adult Contemporary Album and Best Female Artist.

In February 2004, Geyer was presented with a gold record for Tenderland.

The album was re-released in April 2004 with a bonus live disc recorded at Melbourne Athenaeum on 1 November 2004.

== Reception ==
Bruce Elder from Sydney Morning Herald gave the album a positive review saying "Here are songs everyone knows... filtered through years of love and intelligence. The results are fine interpretations that are unique expressions of Geyer's rare and beautiful vocal talent." adding "There's not a bad track on the album and Geyer has demonstrated that, when confronted with the right material and truly sympathetic production values, an Australian musician really can produce a very, very good soul album."

== Track listing ==
Standard edition

1. "Thieves in the Temple" (Prince) – 4:21
2. "Morning Glory" (Bobbie Gentry) – 3:54
3. "Midnight Train to Georgia" (Jim Weatherly) – 5:37
4. "Try a Little Tenderness" (Jimmy Campbell and Reg Connelly, Harry M. Woods) – 4:44
5. "Oh Me, Oh My" (Jim Doris) – 5:18
6. "Sexual Healing" (Marvin Gaye, Odell Brown, David Ritz) – 4:47
7. "A Song for You" (Leon Russell) – 4:23
8. "The Makings of You" (Curtis Mayfield) – 2:30
9. "Now That Love's Taken Over" (Chanté Moore, Simon Law) – 4:37
10. "Heading in the Right Direction" (Garry Paige, Mark Punch) – 4:37
11. "Love Don't Live Here Anymore (Miles Gregory) – 6:46

Special edition (Live at the Athenaeum)

1. "Really, Really Love You" – 5:46
2. "Thieves in the Temple" – 4:45
3. "Morning Glory" – 4:30
4. "Midnight Train to Georgia" – 5:42
5. "Peace and Understanding" – 10:07
6. "Nasty Streak" (Dan Kelly) – 7:27
7. "Killer Lover" (Paul Kelly) – 6:01
8. "Close to You" (Burt Bacharach, Hal David) – 4:57
9. "Love Don't Live Here Anymore (Miles Gregory) – 9:08
10. "It's a Man's Man's Man's World" – 9:06
11. "Sitting in Limbo" (Guilly Bright, Jimmy Cliff) – 6:40
12. "Heading in the Right Direction" – 5:27

== Charts ==
Chart (2003)	Peak position
Australian Albums (ARIA)	11

== Release history ==
Region	Date	Format	Edition(s)	Label	Catalogue
Australia	August 2003	CD; digital download	Standard	ABC Music / Universal Music Australia	13112
Australia	April 2004	CD	Special Edition	ABC Music / Universal Music Australia	13690
