= Renée Geyer (album) =

Renee Geyer

Studio album by Renée Geyer
- Released: September 1973
- Recorded: 1973
- Studio: ATA Studios, Sydney
- Genre: Jazz; R&B; soul
- Length: 46.16
- Label: RCA
- Producer: Gus McNeil

Renée Geyer chronology
Renee Geyer (1973)	It's a Man's Man's World (1974)

Singles from Renée Geyer
- 1. "Space Captain / If Only You Believe" Released: June 1973; 2. "Oh! Boy / "There's No Such Thing As Love" Released: September 1973

Renee Geyer is the debut studio album by Australian soul/R&B singer Renée Geyer. The album was released in September 1973.

== Background and release ==
In 1970, Geyer's singing career began as a vocalist with jazz/blues band Dry Red. She departed Dry Red and joined the jazz/rock group Sun. Sun released the album Sun 1972 in August 1972, by which time, Geyer had already left and joined Mother Earth. Mother Earth consisted of Geyer, Jim Kelly on guitar, David Lindsay on bass guitar, John Proud on drums and Mark Punch on guitar and vocals.

Geyer signed with RCA Records in 1972 and she insisted that Mother Earth accompany her on the album. The album Renée Geyer was recorded in ATA Studios, Sydney and released in September 1973. Following the release, Geyer left Mother Earth to pursue her solo career.

== Track listing ==
Vinyl/ cassette (MSL-102305)

Side one

1. "Do Right Woman, Do Right Man" (Dan Penn, Chips Moman) – 4.38
2. "Moondance" (Van Morrison) – 5.18
3. "If Only You Believe" (Dennis Lambert, Brian Potter) – 2.40
4. "Oh! Boy" (Eugene Record) – 2.59
5. "Just Like a Woman" (Bob Dylan) – 7.40

Side Two

1. "Space Captain" (Matthew Moore) – 4.37
2. "Lean on Me" (Bill Withers) – 4.39
3. "There's No Such Thing As Love" (Anthony Newley, Ian Fraser) – 3.49
4. "Mascara Blue" (Gulliver Smith, Russell Smith) – 5.10
5. "Them Changes" (Buddy Miles) – 4.16

== Album credits ==
=== Musicians ===
- Renée Geyer - vocals, backing vocals

Mother Earth:

- Mark Punch - electric and acoustic guitars
- Jim Kelly - electric and acoustic guitars
- Harry Brus - bass guitar
- Russell Dunlop - drums
- George Almanza - piano
- Bobby Gebbert - piano
