= Sun 1972 =

Studio album by Sun
- Released: August 1972
- Recorded: 1972
- Genre: Jazz rock; progressive
- Length: 47:59
- Label: RCA
- Producer: Horst Liepolt

Sun 1972 is the sole album by Australian progressive jazz-rock group, Sun. It was released in August 1972 with Horst Liepolt producing for RCA Victor. Australian musicologist, Ian McFarlane, opined that it is a, "collectable, progressive jazz-rock album." Australian singer, Renée Geyer, was a member of the group for this recording and later had a solo career.

== Background ==
Originally from Wollongong, Henry Correy, Gary Norwell, Keith Shadwick, Ian Smith and guitarist, Allan Vander Linden, formed a blues band, King Biscuit, which played universities and the nightclub circuit in Sydney from 1968 to 1971. King Biscuit predominantly performed cover versions of Muddy Waters, BB King, Howlin Wolf, Sunnyland Slim and Buddy Guy. They also provided covers of psychedelic rock and soul songs of the late 1960s. King Biscuit changed their name to Sun with the departure of Vander Linden. After Ian Smith left, Renée Geyer was the lead singer for twelve months of the band's existence and is recorded on their sole album, Sun 1972.

Sun were formed in 1971 in Sydney with the line-up of George Alamanza on piano, Correy on bass guitar, Geyer (ex-Dry Red) on lead vocals, Norwell on drums, Steve Phillipson on guitar, and Shadwick on sax, flute, clarinet and backing vocals. Phillipson was soon replaced by Chris Sonnenberg on guitar. They evolved into a jazz rock band that played the wine bars and other major venues during the early 1970s.

Sun's live repertoire was a mixture of jazz, psychedelic rock and blues, inspired by John Coltrane, Archie Shepp and the Art Ensemble of Chicago. All these styles were played with varying degrees of success but with much enthusiasm and peer interest. They were one of the first jazz-rock groups in Australia, challenging musical moulds of the day and garnering critical acclaim from the arts world. As a result, they appeared on ABC TV's arts show, GTK.

Early in 1972 the group signed with RCA Records' Australian subsidiary RCA Victor and started on their debut album, Sun 1972, which is their only commercial recording. It has all original material by the band members (and one past member). It was released in August 1972 by the Australian subsidiary of and produced by jazz entrepreneur, Horst Liepolt. Australian musicologist, Ian McFarlane, opined that it is a, "collectable, progressive jazz-rock album." Sun Drummer Gary Norwell has said "It could be arguably said that the Sun album was not representative of the excitement generated by the bands live gigs as the recording was rushed (8 hours) and the band members were very young and inexperienced" and Norwell said he was suffering an attack of Bronchitis and did not give his best on the day." Norwell also said"with hindsight it is a fairly good effort given the antipathy or complete incomprehension faced by the band by the more conservative rock community at the time. I recommend those that are at all interested have a look at the GTK recordings available from the ABC archive in Sydney, before the archive is dismantled and disposed of as is planned by the current ABC Management." Liepolt later moved to New York and founded the Sweet Basil nightclub.

== After the album ==
Starlee Ford took Geyer"s place in the band and under the influence of Shadwick and Norwell they explored the outer limits of free improvisation, retaining a strong blues connection as well. Ford's vocal range and openness to various styles of music proved was a crowd pleaser. George Almanza left the band and keyboardist, guitarist, and songwriter Tony Slavich, joined the band. Slavich went on to perform with other rock bands in Australia. Norwell and Shadwick left the band shortly after citing a difference in musical direction. Sun continued for a couple of years with Correy, Ford, Slavich, and drummer Ian McLennan. This lineup played a more progrock style and toured Australia extensively but Sun finally folded as an entity after a couple more years.

Keith Shadwick, one of the founding members, went on to record his album Free Time which was released on Candid Records just prior to his death in 2008. The proceeds from the Free Time album are donated to cancer research at Barts Hospital in London. Keith Shadwick's "Free Time" album was launched at Ronnie Scott's Jazz Club in London five days after Keith's death. Young lions of the London jazz scene jammed into the night as a tribute to Shadwick. The "Free Time" album consists of Shadwick on piano and reeds playing his own compositions and features Robert Lucky, and Justin Mcoy on bass guitar with some incendiary drumming by original partner Gary Norwell. Shadwick's music on this album continues the adventurous tradition of the Sun live gigs. The label candidrecords.com.uk have sold out the first pressing of "Free Time".

Sun bass player Henry Correy has released several successful blues albums. Guitarist Chris Sonnenberg returned to the USA in 1973 and continued his musical career. Pianist George Almanza had a distinguished career in music and died some years ago. Ian Smith from Thirroul had contributed a song to the Sun album, and Sydney singer Steve Philipson. Singer-songwriter, Richard Clapton, had a six-week stint as lead vocalist in early 1973, followed by Starlee Ford, a singer who appeared in the original Australian production of the rock musical, Hair, and made a contribution as Geyer's permanent replacement. Pianist, Victor Nicholso, replaced Almanza before being replaced himself by, Tony Slavich. Renée Geyer went on to become a figure in the popular music scene.

== Track listing ==
1. "Silver Dollar Rag" - 2.15 (George Almanza)
2. "Message" - 6.25 (Chris Sonnenberg)
3. "No Cherries for Henry" - 9.24 (Sun)
4. "S.S." - 6.59 (Keith Shadwick, Sonnenberg)
5. "I Really Want to Know" - 4.18 (Ian Smith, arr. Sun)
6. "Largesse" - 3.25 (Almanza, Correy, Shadwick)
7. "3-1/2" - 6.44 (Shadwick)
8. "Vendetta" - 6.34 (Almanza)
9. "Not the Time Now" - 3.42 (Shadwick)

== Personnel ==
Sun members

- George Almanza – piano
- Henry Correy – bass guitar
- Renée Geyer – lead vocals
- Gary Norwell – drums
- Keith Shadwick – tenor, alto and soprano saxophones, flute, clarinet
- Chris Sonnenberg – lead guitar

Recording details

- Horst Liepolt – producer
