= All My Love (Renée Geyer song) =

Single by Renée Geyer

from the album Sing to Me
- A-side: "All My Love"
- B-side: "Guess Who I Saw Today"
- Released: May 27, 1985
- Recorded: 1985
- Genre: Funk music; soul; synth-pop
- Length: 4:14
- Label: WEA
- Songwriter(s): Blondie Chaplin; Ray Ohara
- Producer(s): Ricky Fataar

Renée Geyer singles chronology
"Every Beat of My Heart" (1984)	"All My Love" (1985)	"Every Day of the Week" (1985)

"All My Love" is a song by Australian singer Renée Geyer. The song was released in 1985 as the lead single from Geyer's eighth studio album, Sing to Me (1985). It became Geyer's sixth top 40 single, peaking at number 28 on the Australian singles chart. Also available on 12" extended format at the time of release.

== Track listing ==
Australian 7" Single

- Side A "All My Love" – 4:14
- Side B "Guess Who I Saw Today" – 3:54

Australian 12" Single

- Side A "All My Love" (Extended Mix) – 6:10
- Side B1 "Guess Who I Saw Today" – 3:54
- Side B2 "All My Love" – 4:14

== Charts ==
Chart (1985)	Peak position
Australia (Kent Music Report)	28
