= Renée Geyer =

Australian jazz, soul and R&B singer (1953–2023)

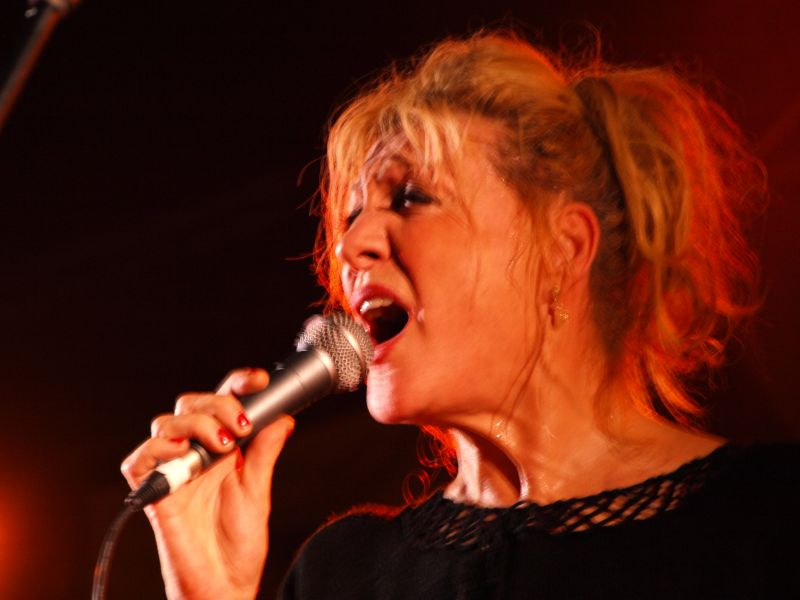
- Geyer in 2007

Background information
- Born: Renée Rebecca Geyer; 11 September 1953; Melbourne, Victoria, Australia
- Died: 17 January 2023 (aged 69) Geelong, Victoria, Australia
- Genres: Pop; soul; R&B
- Occupation: Singer
- Instrument: Vocals
- Years active: 1970–2023
- Labels: RCA; EMI; A&M; Mushroom; Festival; Polydor; Portrait; WEA; ABC; Larrikin
- Formerly of: Dry Red; Sun; Mother Earth; Sanctuary; Easy Pieces; Bump Band

Renée Rebecca Geyer (11 September 1953 – 17 January 2023) was an Australian singer who was an acclaimed jazz, soul and R&B musician. She released 15 studio albums with Moving Along (1977) and Tenderland (2003) both reaching number 11 on the Australian charts. Geyer's singles success as a solo artist in Australia were with "It's a Man's Man's World", "Heading in the Right Direction" and "Stares and Whispers" in the 1970s and "Say I Love You" in the 1980s. The latter also reached number one in New Zealand. The singer was an internationally respected and sought-after backing vocalist, whose session credits include work with Sting, Chaka Khan, Toni Childs, Joe Cocker, Neil Diamond, Men at Work and Trouble Funk.

Geyer's autobiography, Confessions of a Difficult Woman (2000), co-written with music journalist Ed Nimmervoll detailed her drug addictions, sex life and career in music. She described herself as "a white Hungarian Jew from Australia sounding like a 65-year-old black man from Alabama." She spent more than 10 years based in the United States while working as a session vocalist, but had little chart success there under her own name. Geyer returned to Australia in the mid-1990s and her career continued into the 21st century. Rock historian Ian McFarlane described Geyer as having a "rich, soulful, passionate and husky vocal delivery". Her status in the Australian music industry was recognised when she was inducted into the ARIA Hall of Fame on 14 July 2005. Geyer and fellow 1970s singer Marcia Hines are the subjects of Australian academic Jon Stratton's 2008 cultural studies article A Jew Singing Like a Black Woman In Australia. Geyer died of lung cancer which was attributed to her long addiction to smoking cigarettes.

== Biography ==
=== 1953–1973: Early years ===
Renée Rebecca Geyer, was born on 11 September 1953 in Melbourne, to a Hungarian-Jewish father, Edward Geyer (1920–2013), and a Slovak-Jewish mother, Gabriella (1926–2017), a Holocaust survivor, as the youngest of three children. The couple had met in Palestine and migrated to Melbourne in 1951 where her father managed the Warsaw Centre. Geyer was named Renée after another Holocaust survivor who had helped her mother in Auschwitz after Josef Mengele had assigned the rest of her mother's family to death. In 1955 the Geyers moved to Sydney where her parents were managers of Komlos Hostel, Greenwich until 1963—thereafter they started their own Geyer Kosher catering service. Both elder siblings were academically gifted, but Geyer described herself as a problem child, while her parents called her übermutig (German for "reckless"). She attended various schools and was expelled from a private school, Methodist Ladies College, for petty stealing. Her first job was as a receptionist for the Australian Law Society.

In 1970, at the age of 16, while still at Sydney Girls High School or at Dover Heights Girls' High, Geyer began her singing career as a vocalist with jazz-blues band Dry Red. The group worked at Kask Wine Bar, Bondi; where she earned $5 a night her father disapproved of her chosen career, "[he] said if I was going to do that, I was not going to live at home. So to make peace I moved out. I left home—and school... I got a job singing in a bar straight away, and my mum made sure I did not go hungry." Dry Red also contained Eric McCusker (later of Mondo Rock). For her audition she sang the Bee Gees' hit "To Love Somebody". She left Dry Red for other bands and in 1971 joined the more accomplished jazz-rock group Sun.

With Geyer, Sun's line-up was George Almanza (piano), Henry Correy (bass guitar), Gary Norwell (drums), Keith Shadwick (saxophone, flute, clarinet, vocals) and Chris Sonnenberg (guitar). The group released one studio album with Geyer, Sun 1972 in August 1972 but she departed before it appeared and was replaced by Starlee Ford on lead vocals. In 2022 a four-disc album by various Sun line-ups, Rehearsal Recordings Album, was issued. John Shand of The Sydney Morning Herald observed, "[on Geyer's tracks] you hear the tug of war between her R&B comfort zone and the freer, jazzier, moodier pieces... [including] diving to the depths of her range, and singing with such bruising power as summons a sudden blazing guitar solo."

Late in 1972 Geyer joined Mother Earth whose R&B, soul music style was more in keeping with Geyer's idiom. Mother Earth consisted of Geyer, Jim Kelly (guitar), David Lindsay (bass guitar), John Proud (drums) and Mark Punch (guitar, vocals). Lindsay, Proud and Punch had all been members of Nine Stage Horizon, while Kelly was from Levi Smith's Clefs. By the start of the following year Harry Brus had replaced Lindsay on bass guitar and Russell Dunlop replaced Proud on drums. Although the group performed on ABC-TV's popular music show GTK they did not record any material under their own name.

=== 1973–1976: Renée Geyer, It's a Man's Man's World and Ready to Deal ===
In 1973 Geyer was signed to RCA Records, which had released Sun's album the year before. Already showing signs of her self-proclaimed "Difficult Woman" tag, Geyer loyally insisted that her Mother Earth bandmates back her on her solo recordings and used Brus on bass guitar, Dunlop on drums, Kelly on electric and acoustic guitars and Punch on electric and acoustic guitars; as well as Almanza on piano and Bobby Gebbert on piano. Her self-titled debut studio album was released in September 1973 which mostly consisted of R&B/Soul cover versions of overseas hits and was produced by Gus McNeil at ATA Studios, Sydney. The Australian Jewish Times' writer praised her "superb vocal talents" and recognised her as an "exciting and talented new star." Geyer left Mother Earth by the end of the year.

Geyer's second studio album, It's a Man's Man's World (August 1974), was produced by Tweed Harris (ex-the Groove). Aside from Harris on keyboards it was recorded with Mike Brady on backing vocals, Bobby Bright on backing vocals, Geoff Cox on drums, Tim Gaze on guitar and Phil Manning on guitar. It became her first charting album when it peaked at No. 28 in October on the Kent Music Report. The title track, "It's a Man's Man's World" (November), is a cover version of James Brown's 1965 hit and became her first top 50 single at No. 44.

By December 1974 Geyer had joined with jazz-funk group Sanctuary to tour her second album. Sanctuary's original line-up was Billy Green on guitar (ex-Doug Parkinson in Focus) together with ex-Chain members Barry Harvey on drums, Mal Logan on keyboards and Barry Sullivan on bass guitar. Geyer was disenchanted with RCA's refusal to allow her to record more original material, she was prepared to wait out her contract. However, former Chain members convinced Geyer to contact their label, Mushroom Records' boss Michael Gudinski and talent manager Ray Evans to strike a deal so they would record her and RCA would release her material with a Mushroom logo.

This arrangement led to Geyer's third studio album, Ready to Deal, which was recorded in August–September 1975, with Sanctuary renamed Renée Geyer Band with the line-up Logan, Sullivan, Mark Punch on guitar (ex-Mother Earth) and Greg Tell on drums. They co-wrote most of the material for the album; the album was released in November to reach No. 21. It provided one of Geyer's signature songs "Heading in the Right Direction", written by Punch and Garry Paige (both ex-the Johnny Rocco Band), which reached the top 40 in 1976. Geyer reflected on the local music scene, "The sort of music I like and the band is into is not very popular yet in Australia." She expected to "go overseas to make a name, and money."

Geyer participated in the 1975 federal election campaign for the Liberal Party, singing their theme song "Turn on the Lights". In later years she distanced herself from the Liberals and politics in general, stating she had done their theme song to earn enough money to record an album in the United States, where she had signed a contract with Polydor Records. Before departing Mick Rogers on guitar (ex-Manfred Mann's Earth Band) replaced Punch and Renée Geyer Band recorded a live album, Really Really Love You, at their farewell concert in Melbourne's Dallas Brooks Hall on 11 April 1976. It was released in August and reach the top 50; "Shaky Ground", the related single, appeared in September. Geyer had relocated to the Los Angeles mid-1976.

=== 1977–1979: USA, Moving Along, Winning and Blues License ===
In May 1977 Geyer released her fourth studio album Moving Along on RCA/Mushroom Records, which peaked at No. 11 in Australia. It used Motown Records producer Frank Wilson, with the album's Polydor Records release for the US market re-titled Renée Geyer. Her backing musicians, Logan and Sullivan were supplemented by members of Stevie Wonder's band, as well as Ray Parker Jr. and other US session musicians. According to Cashbox' reviewer it showcased the "dynamic interpretive qualities in her voice and material that ranges from disco to MOR... she seems poised and ready for a listen by the Yanks." It provided Geyer's biggest Australian hit single, at the time, with "Stares and Whispers" (April) peaking at No. 17. In the US, radio stations began playing several of the album's tracks, in particular her re-recorded version of "Heading in the Right Direction", which was issued as her first US & UK single.

Polydor were aware that her vocal style led listeners to incorrectly assume she was black and urged her to keep a low profile until her popularity had grown, thus they suggested her US album release should not include her photograph. Known for her uncompromising and direct personal manner, Geyer refused to accede to such deception and insisted on marketing with a cover photograph of what she referred to as "my big pink huge face". After the album's release, interest in Geyer as a solo artist subsided in the US, which she later blamed on the headstrong decision regarding marketing. Nevertheless, Geyer earned respect in the US recording industry as a session vocalist for several years working in Los Angeles while periodically returning to Australia. In Australia in late 1977, Geyer released the single "Restless Years", the theme song for the Ten Network's TV soapie The Restless Years, with its writer Mike Perjanik. "Restless Years" reached the top 40 in early 1978. Mushroom released her compilation album, Renée Geyer at Her Very Best in November 1977, which peaked at No. 53.

In 1978 Geyer voiced Christine for Walter Murphy's concept album Phantom of the Opera. Amy Hanson of AllMusic found Murphy's vocal tracks to be "at best drab and lifeless, and frequently droning and dire." In December of that year Geyer released her fifth studio album Winner; backing her were Punch, Tell and Tim Partridge on bass guitar (of Kevin Borich Express), together with session musicians. The artist was unhappy with its mix and the lack of support from Polydor—she negotiated a release from her contract, brought the master tapes to Australia where it was remixed and released. Geyer referred to Winner as "a bit of a loser" as its material was not up to standard. Despite touring Australia promoting it, neither the album nor related singles reached the top 50.

For her next studio album, Blues License (June 1979), she combined with Australian guitarist Kevin Borich and his band Express to perform straight blues material. The added fire in her vocals was sparked by harder edged backing from the group and additional musicians: Logan, Punch, Kerrie Biddell on backing vocals (Brian Cadd band) and Tim Piper on guitar (ex-Chain, Blackfeather). Geyer and Logan produced the album at Trafalgar Studios, Melbourne. It reached the top 50, and became a fan favourite.

=== 1980–1984: So Lucky, Renée Live and Faves ===
In 1981 Geyer recorded her seventh studio album So Lucky at Shangri-La Studios, Malibu, California. Helmed by Rob Fraboni (The Beach Boys, Bob Dylan, The Band) and Ricky Fataar (Beach Boys), the album moved her genre from soul and added a tougher, rootsy rock/R&B style, while incorporating salsa and reggae. Garry Raffaele of The Canberra Times described it as "hard-driving, powerful, emotive rock" with her vocals depicting "an edge so hard yet so sensual as to be alarming." The lead single "Say I Love You" was released in May and became her biggest hit when it reached No. 5 on the Australian charts and No. 1 in New Zealand. So Lucky was released in November 1981 and provided two further singles, "Do You Know What I Mean" (December 1981), which reached the Australian and New Zealand top 30s and "I Can Feel the Fire" (February 1982).

Geyer performed in Mushroom's 10th anniversary celebration, the Mushroom Evolution Concert on Australia Day (26 January) long week-end in 1982 at the Myer Music Bowl. So Lucky was released internationally by Portrait Records as Renée Geyer by Renée Geyer and the Bump Band in 1982. Also in that year Mushroom re-issued her previous albums. In the following year, Geyer released her second live album Renée Live in May, which included a duet with Glenn Shorrock (of Little River Band) on a cover version of Dusty Springfield's 1966 single "Goin' Back". In November Mushroom released a second compilation album, Faves, which concluded her contract. Geyer returned to the US late in 1983 and concentrated on the Los Angeles musical scene. During the 1980s she also undertook minor acting roles in Australian feature films Starstruck (1982) and My First Wife (1984) and TV series Sweet and Sour (1984).

=== 1985–1991: United States, Sing to Me, Renée Live at the Basement and Easy Pieces ===
Geyer periodically visited Australia; she performed three songs, "Put a Little Love in Your Heart", "All My Love" and "Telling it like it Is", for the Oz for Africa concert (part of the global Live Aid program) in March 1985. Concert excerpts were broadcast in Australia (on both Seven Network and Nine Network) and on MTV in the US.

In 1985 Geyer signed with WEA Records and in May she released a single "All My Love", which peaked at number 28. In the following month her eighth studio album, Sing to Me, peaked at number 37. It was not given a US release and none of the follow-up singles reached the top 50—Geyer and WEA parted ways. She recorded a live album Live at the Basement in May 1986, which was released later that year by ABC Records.

Geyer continued as an in-demand US session vocalist, as in Australia. In 1986 she sang lead vocals on the Danny Hutton Hitters cover of Nik Kewshaw's "Wouldn't It Be Good" that was featured in the John Hughes 1986 film Pretty In Pink. She appeared on Sting's 1987 double-album, ...Nothing Like the Sun, including his single "We'll Be Together". She performed a duet with Joe Cocker on his 1987 album Unchain My Heart and, following its release, toured Europe with him as a backing vocalist. She was audible on Toni Childs' hit "Don't Walk Away" from that artist's 1988 album Union. Other sessions included working with Neil Diamond, Julio Iglesias, Buddy Guy and Bonnie Raitt. She also recorded "Is it Hot in Here" for the soundtrack of the 1988 film Mystic Pizza. She described her backing vocals as supplying "The old Alabama black man wailing on the end of a record so they hire the white Jewish girl from Australia to do it."

In 1988 Geyer joined the group Easy Pieces, with Hamish Stuart (guitar and vocals) and Steve Ferrone (drums) both ex-the Average White Band and Anthony Jackson (bass guitar). They signed to A&M Records and their self-titled album, Easy Pieces, was released in 1988 to positive reviews, but the label changed distributors just as it was released and music stores could not order copies. The album did not chart.

=== 1992–1999: Seven Deadly Sins, Difficult Woman, The Best of Renee Geyer and Sweet Life ===
Foggy Highway
Geyer's version of Paul Kelly's "Foggy Highway" for the various artists soundtrack, Seven Deadly Sins: Music from the ABC TV Series in 1993. Kelly provided guitar for this recording. He wrote "Difficult Woman" specifically for Geyer and produced her 1994 album, Difficult Woman.

Geyer visited Australia in 1992 and recorded a number of songs, including "Foggy Highway", for the ABC-TV mini series Seven Deadly Sins, alongside Vika Bull, Deborah Conway and Paul Kelly. The soundtrack album was released in February 1993 and peaked at number 71 on the ARIA Charts. Two singles were released from the soundtrack including Geyer's cover of Jean Stafford's "Someday I'll Take Home The Roses". Kelly also produced Geyer's ninth studio album Difficult Woman which was released on Larrikin Records in 1994. It was her first solo studio album in 9 years. The exposure encouraged Geyer to move back to Australia and re-established herself on the live circuit. Her performances showed a more relaxed stage persona than at her peak when her innate shyness was often cleverly disguised. Now a confident, mature woman she showed off a hitherto hidden wicked sense of humour.

In May 1998 Mushroom Records released The Best of Renee Geyer 1973-1998, which peaked at number 50 in New Zealand and 53 in Australia. Early pressings were released with a bonus disc, Renéemixed, containing remixed tracks including her 1981 single "Say I Love You", which was issued as the lead single by Groove 21/20 featuring Geyer. Also in 1998 Geyer recorded "Yil Lull" alongside Kelly, Archie Roach, Christine Anu, Judith Durham, Kutcha Edwards and Tiddas. In March 1999 Geyer released her tenth studio album Sweet Life, which was co-produced by Kelly with Joe Camilleri (Jo Jo Zep & The Falcons, The Black Sorrows). The album peaked at number 50 in the ARIA Charts.

=== 2000–2008: ARIA Hall of Fame, Tenderland, Tonight and Dedicated ===
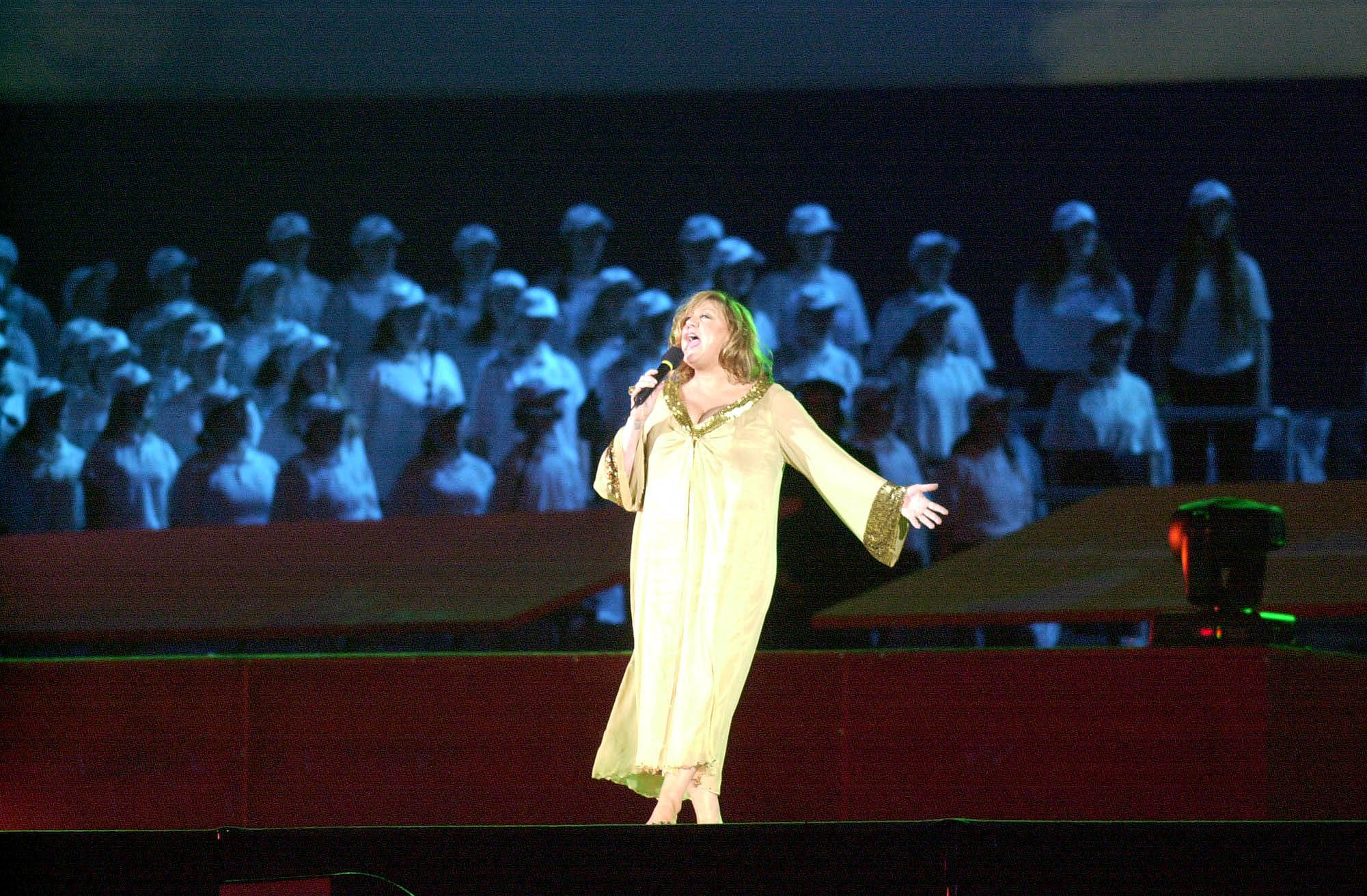
Geyer performing with a choir behind her at the 2000 Summer Paralympics Opening Ceremony

In April 2000 Geyer released her autobiography, Confessions of a Difficult Woman: The Renée Geyer Story, referencing her 1994 studio album, Difficult Woman. It was co-written with Australian music journalist Ed Nimmervoll. According to ABC Radio Melbourne's reviewer Sian Prior it has "plenty of talk about sex and drugs and rock'n'roll... [but] you get a sense of a quite vulnerable person under the confident stage persona... [and it is] written in a nice conversational style, easy to read, and structured not chronologically as you might expect, but in themed chapters."

In October 2000 Geyer performed at the Opening Ceremony of the Summer Paralympics in Sydney. In August 2003 the singer released her eleventh studio album Tenderland. It peaked at number 11 on the ARIA Charts, equalling her highest-charting album in her career. Live at the Athenaeum was released in April 2004 and Geyer's twelfth studio album Tonight in April 2005.

Geyer was inducted into the ARIA Hall of Fame on 14 July 2005 by her former label boss Gudinski. At the ceremony, contemporary R&B singer Jade MacRae performed a Geyer medley, followed by Geyer singing her 1975 hit "It's a Man's Man's World". During July 2007 Geyer undertook the role of stepmother in musical theatre play Sleeping Beauty: This is Not a Lullaby at the Malthouse Theatre, Melbourne. In 2008 she provided a voice in the claymation film Mary & Max by Adam Elliot.

Geyer and fellow 1970s singer, Marcia Hines, are the subjects of Australian academic, Jon Stratton's 2008 cultural studies article, "A Jew Singing Like a Black Woman in Australia: Race, Renée Geyer and Marcia Hines". Geyer delivered a two-hour master class on 3 December 2008 to illustrate her annoyance at vocal gymnastics used by singers Mariah Carey and Christina Aguilera which had influenced contestants on talent quests such as Australian Idol. Geyer was approached to be a judge on Australian Idol and The X Factor but declined; she criticised judges on Australian Idol: Hines for being "so neutral, I don't hear an opinion" and Kyle Sandilands for his hurtful commentary rather than constructive criticisms.

=== 2009–2023: Renéessance, The Ultimate Collection and Swing ===
After signing with Liberation Blue Records, which was owned by Gudinski, Geyer released another album, Renéessance in May 2009. It is a collection of newly recorded acoustic versions of previously recorded tracks. In June of that year, Geyer was diagnosed with breast cancer and following surgery was told it had been detected early and a full recovery was expected.

In March 2010 Warner Music Australia released another compilation album, The Ultimate Collection, which is her highest-charting album in New Zealand—peaking at number 21. In August 2011 she was fined for careless driving over two incidents in Victoria in 2010 and 2011, where she crashed into parked cars, a tree and a shop front. Her lawyer had blamed the crashes on a drug she was taking to treat breast cancer which he said led to a loss of concentration. She was fined $500, which was ordered to be paid to the Cancer Council.

In April 2013 Geyer released her fifteenth and last studio album Swing, which consists of big-band cover versions. It peaked at number 22 in Australia. Geyer toured the album across 2013. In November 2013 the singer was inducted into the Music Victoria Hall of Fame.

In 2015, Geyer allegedly verbally attacked a receptionist at the Adina Hotel in Haymarket, leaving the receptionist in tears after telling Geyer that she needed to provide vehicle registration to access the car park. In January 2017, Geyer was not convicted but was handed a 12-month good behaviour bond. In October 2018 proposed recording a new album, "I am playing it by ear, but sometime in the next year, I would like to do something—another new album. I have collaborated with people on different things and other projects, but I would like to do something of my own again. And I think in the next twelve months it will happen. And it probably might be my last one. I will probably do something, like a tribute to a blues situation, because I have been so influenced by the blues through my life, and I have never really spoken to that. So, I might do something, that has to do with that. Some version of a blues record."

In January 2023 Geyer was admitted to a Geelong hospital for hip surgery. It was discovered that she had inoperable lung cancer. Renée Geyer died at that hospital from surgical complications on 17 January 2023 at the age of 69. A public memorial in her honour was held in April 2023 in St. Kilda, performers included Kevin Borich, Kate Ceberano, Deborah Conway, Paul Kelly and Russell Morris. Geyer was a resident of St Kilda and lived in a number of rental properties around the area over the years, always identifying as "a Melbourne person at heart".

== Bibliography ==
- Geyer, Renée; Nimmervoll, Ed (26 April 2000). Confessions of a Difficult Woman: The Renée Geyer Story. Pymble, NSW: HarperCollins. ISBN 978-0-7322-6563-2.

== Discography ==
- Renée Geyer (1973)
- It's a Man's Man's World (1974)
- Ready to Deal (1975)
- Moving Along (1977)
- Winner (1978)
- Blues License (1979)
- So Lucky (1981)
- Sing to Me (1985)
- Difficult Woman (1994)
- Sweet Life (1999)
- Tenderland (2003)
- Tonight (2005)
- Dedicated (2007)
- Renéessance (2009)
- Swing (2013)

== Awards and nominations ==
=== ARIA Awards ===
The ARIA Music Awards is an annual awards ceremony held by the Australian Recording Industry Association. They commenced in 1987. Geyer was nominated six times. In 2005, she was inducted into the ARIA Hall of Fame.

Year	Nominee / work	Award	Result
1987	Live at the Basement	Best Female Artist	Nominated
1999	Sweet Life	Best Adult Contemporary Album	Nominated
2003	Tenderland	Best Female Artist	Nominated
2003	Tenderland	Best Adult Contemporary Album	Nominated
2005	Tonight	Best Adult Contemporary Album	Nominated
2005	Renée Geyer	ARIA Hall of Fame	inductee
2013	Swing	Best Jazz Album	Nominated

=== Australian Women in Music Awards ===
The Australian Women in Music Awards is an annual event that honours women for their contributions to the Australian music industry. They were first awarded in 2018.

Year	Nominee / work	Award	Result	Ref.
2018	Renée Geyer	Lifetime Achievement Award	awardee	
2023	Renée Geyer	Honour Roll	awarded	

=== Countdown Music and Video Awards ===
The Countdown Music and Video Awards were an annual award ceremony based on responses from viewers of Countdown between 1979 and 1986. Geyer was nominated twice.

Year	Nominee / work	Award	Result
1981	Renée Geyer	Most Popular Female	Nominated
1983	Renée Geyer	Most Popular Female	Nominated

=== Music Victoria Awards ===
The Music Victoria Awards are an annual awards night celebrating Victorian music. They commenced in 2005.

Year	Nominee / work	Award	Result	Ref.
2013	Renée Geyer	Hall of Fame	inductee	

== Appearances ==
=== Film ===
Year	Title	Role	Type
1984	My First Wife	Barmaid	Feature film
1988	A Day and a Half	Herself	Short film
1995	Stickoitiveness	Herself	Short film
2009	Mary and Max	Vera Lorraine Dinkle (voice)	Animated feature film
