= Lee Michaels =

American rock musician (born 1945)

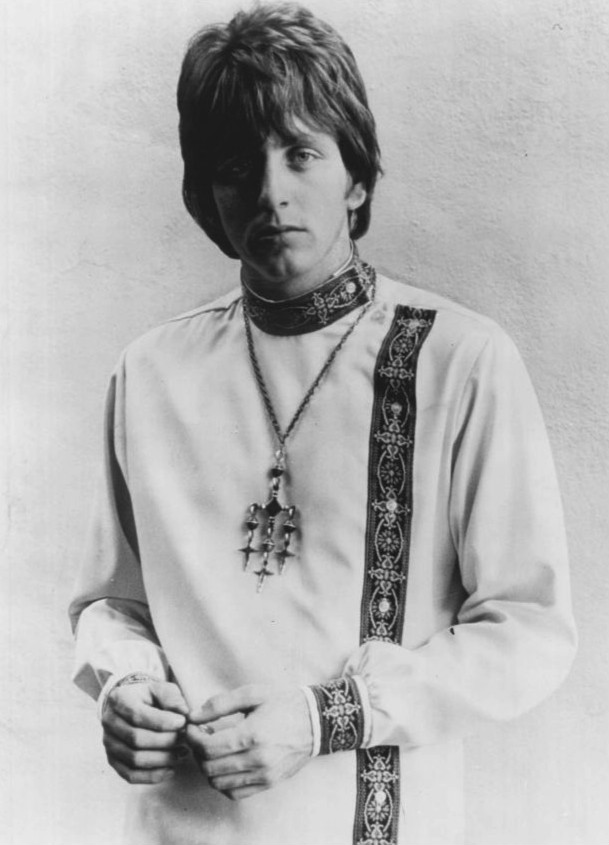
- Michaels in 1968

Background information
- Also known as: Lee Eugene Michaels
- Born: Michael Lee Olson; November 24, 1945 (age 80); Los Angeles, California, U.S.
- Genre: Rock
- Occupations: Musician, Restaurateur
- Instruments: Vocals; organ; piano; guitar
- Years active: 1960s–1970s
- Labels: A&M; Columbia

Lee Eugene Michaels (born Michael Lee Olson, November 24, 1945) is an American rock musician who sings and accompanies himself on organ, piano, or guitar. He is best known for his 1971 Top 10 US hit single, "Do You Know What I Mean". In 1988 he founded the Marina del Rey, California-based restaurant chain Killer Shrimp which he and his family continue to operate to this day.

== Career ==
=== Music ===
Born in Los Angeles, California, United States, Michaels began his career with The Sentinals, a San Luis Obispo, California-based surf group that included drummer Johny Barbata (later of The Turtles, Jefferson Airplane and Jefferson Starship). Michaels joined Barbata in the Joel Scott Hill Trio, a group led by guitarist Joel Scott Hill. Michaels later moved to San Francisco, where he joined an early version of The Family Tree, a band led by Bob Segarini. In 1967, he signed a contract with A&M Records, releasing his debut album, Carnival of Life, later that year with David Potter on drums. As a session musician, he played with Jimi Hendrix, among others.

Michaels' choice of the Hammond organ as his primary instrument was unusual for the time, as was his bare-bones stage and studio accompaniment: usually with just a single drummer most often a musician known as "Frosty," (real name Bartholomew Smith-Frost), who was a member of Sweathog, and whose barehanded technique was an inspiration for John Bonham, or with Joel Larson of The Grass Roots. This unorthodox approach attracted a following in San Francisco, and some critical notice. (Sounds Magazine, for one, reported of Michaels that he had been called "the ultimate power organist.") But Michaels did not achieve real commercial success until the release of his fifth album.

That album, titled 5th and released in 1971, produced a surprise US Top 10 hit (No. 6 in late 1971), "Do You Know What I Mean." It was an autobiographical homage to the loss of a girlfriend. Billboard ranked "Do You Know What I Mean" as the No. 19 song for 1971. Michaels's Top 40 follow-up, a cover version of the Motown standard, "Can I Get a Witness," peaked at No. 39 on Christmas Day 1971, eight years to the week after Marvin Gaye's version peaked at No. 22. Michaels recorded two more albums for A&M before signing a recording contract with Columbia Records in 1973. With his Columbia recordings failing to generate much interest, Michaels went into semi-retirement from the music industry by the end of the decade.

In 1991, Michaels obtained full rights to all of his A&M recordings in a settlement of disputes that had arisen from A&M granting licenses to Delicious Vinyl for the use of Michaels's recordings by means of digital sampling on several Young MC recordings. Once he had regained full ownership rights, Michaels granted licenses to Rhino Records and Shout Factory to release several "best of" albums over the years. Starting in November 2015, Manifesto Records has been re-releasing his entire catalog of A&M and Columbia recordings on compact disc and vinyl through to February 2016.

=== Restaurateur ===
Lee opened his family-owned restaurant Killer Shrimp which he founded in 1988 in Marina del Rey, California. He still operates the restaurant today. It has since expanded to Killer Sushi, Killer Cafe, and Killer Yacht Club.

== Discography ==
=== Studio albums + live album ===
Title	Details	United States	Australia
Carnival of Life	Release date: 1968; Label: A&M; Formats: LP	—	—
Recital	Release date: 1968; Label: A&M; Formats: LP	—	—
Lee Michaels	Release date: 1969; Label: A&M; Formats: LP	53	—
Barrel	Release date: 1970; Label: A&M; Formats: LP	51	—
5th	Release date: 1971; Label: A&M; Formats: LP	16	38
Space and First Takes	Release date: 1972; Label: A&M; Formats: LP	78	—
Lee Michaels Live	Release date: 1973; Label: A&M; Formats: 2-LP	135	—
Nice Day for Something	Release date: 1973; Label: Columbia; Formats: LP	172	—
Tailface	Release date: 1974; Label: Columbia; Formats: LP	—	—
Absolute Lee	Release date: 1983; Label: Squish; Formats: LP	—	—
"—" denotes releases that did not chart

=== Singles ===
Year	Title	Peak chart positions		Record Label	B-side	Album
Year	Title	US	AUS	Record Label	B-side	Album
1968	"Love"	—	—	A&M Records	"Sounding the Sleeping"	Carnival of Life
1968	"If I Lose You"	—	—	A&M Records	"My Friends"	Recital
1969	"Goodbye, Goodbye"	—	—	A&M Records	"The War"	
1969	"Heighty Hi"	106	47	A&M Records	"Want My Baby"	Lee Michaels
1970	"What Now America"	—	—	A&M Records	"Uummmm My Lady"	Barrel
1971	"Do You Know What I Mean"	6	26	A&M Records	"Keep the Circle Turning"	5th
1971	"Can I Get a Witness"	39	—	A&M Records	"You Are What You Do"	5th
1972	"Hold on to Freedom"	104*	—	A&M Records	"Own Special Way (As Long As)"	Space and First Takes
1973	"Same Old Song"	—	—	Columbia Records	"Rock and Roll Community"	Nice Day for Something
1973	"Rock Me Baby"	—	—	A&M Records	"Heighty Hi"	Lee Michaels Live
"—" denotes releases that did not chart. US chart is Billboard unless otherwise noted. *Cashbox singles chart.

=== Compilation CDs ===
- The Lee Michaels Collection (Rhino, 1992)
- The Best of Lee Michaels (One Way, 1997)
- Hello: The Very Best of Lee Michaels (Shout Factory, 2004)
- Heighty Hi: The Best of Lee Michaels (Manifesto, 2015)
- The Complete A&M Albums Collection [7-CD set] (Manifesto, 2015)
