= Sing to Me (album) =

Studio album by Renée Geyer
- Released: June 7, 1985
- Recorded: 1984−85
- Genre: Electronic; funk; R&B; soul; pop
- Label: WEA
- Producer: Ricky Fataar

Renée Geyer chronology
Faves (1983)	Sing to Me (1985)	Renée Live at the Basement (1986)

Singles from Sing to Me
- 1. "All My Love" Released: May 1985; 2. "Every Day of the Week" Released: 26 August 1985; 3. "Faithful Love" Released: December 1985

Sing to Me is the eighth studio album by Australian soul/R&B singer Renée Geyer. The album was released in June 1985 and peaked at number 37 on the Kent Music Report. It was Geyer's first and only album released on the WEA label.

== Track listing ==
Vinyl/ cassette (WEA – 252139.1)

Side one

1. "Without Love" (Marc Jordan, Renée Geyer) – 3:46
2. "All My Love" (Blondie Chaplin, Ray O'Hara) – 4:16
3. "Woman in Love" (Marc Hunter, Renée Geyer, Ricky Fataar) – 4:08
4. "Everyday of the Week" (Tim Finn) – 3:34
5. "Sing to Me" (Don Walker) – 3:11

Side two

6. "Telling It Like It Is" (Alan Mansfield, Johanna Pigott, Todd Hunter) – 4:12
7. "Fever" (John Capek, Michael Jay, Renée Geyer) – 4:27
8. "Guess Who I Saw Today" (Elisse Boyd, Murray Grand) – 3:53
9. "Faithful Love" (Marc Jordan, Steve Kipner) – 3:40
10. "Memory" (Alan Mansfield, Renée Geyer, Ricky Fataar, Todd Hunter, Wendy De Waal) – 4:04

== Charts ==
Weekly chart performance for Sing to Me
Chart (1985)	Peak position
Australian Albums (Kent Music Report)	37
