= Difficult Woman =

Studio album by Renée Geyer
- Released: September 1994
- Studio: Stagg Street Studios, Los Angeles & Cherokee Studios Hollywood; United States.
- Genre: Jazz; funk; blues; soul
- Label: Larrikin Records
- Producer: Paul Kelly

Renée Geyer chronology
Seven Deadly Sins (1993)	Difficult Woman (1994)	The Best of Renee Geyer 1973–1998 (1998)

Singles from Difficult Woman
- 1. "Careless" Released: November 1994

Difficult Woman is the ninth studio album by Australian soul and R&B singer Renée Geyer. The album was released in September 1994 and peaked at number 91 on the ARIA Charts.

In a 2009 with ABC, Geyer said of Paul Kelly, "I think some of the best things that he's ever written have been when he's written for somebody else. He's got an uncanny way of putting things that a billion people have said a million times, but he has a way of making it sound like it's the first time you've heard it. And that's why he's such a great writer." adding the title track is "about a complicated woman and that's it."

The album was on LP for the first time in March 2024.

== Track listing ==
1. "Close" (Paul Kelly) – 4:12
2. "Careless" (featuring Paul Kelly) (Kelly) – 3:43
3. "Difficult Woman" (Kelly) – 4:26
4. "God Only Knows" (Brian Wilson, Tony Asher) – 2:03
5. "Foggy Highway" (Kelly) – 3:29
6. "Summer, Winter, Spring and Fall" (featuring Dori Caymmi) (Kelly, Renée Geyer) – 5:32
7. "Just the Thought of You" (Harry Brus, Matt Sherrod, Geyer) – 4:54
8. "Sweet Guy" (Kelly) – 4:35
9. "Real" (John Capek, Michael Rothenberg, Geyer) – 5:18
10. "He Was Too Good to Me" (Richard Rodgers, Lorenz Hart) – 3:09
11. Trouble" (John Clifforth, Geyer) – 3:10

== Charts ==
Chart (1994)	Peak position
Australian Albums (ARIA)	91

== Release history ==
Region	Date	Format	Edition(s)	Label	Catalogue
Australia	September 1994	CD; Cassette	Standard	Larrikin Records	LRJ342
Australia	15 March 2024	LP	re-issue	Bloodline Records	BLOOD112LP
