= Sweet Life (album) =

Studio album by Renée Geyer
- Released: March 1999
- Genre: Rock; soul; R&B
- Length: 46:44
- Label: Capitol Records / EMI Music
- Producer: Joe Camilleri, Paul Kelly

Renée Geyer chronology
The Best of Renee Geyer 1973-1998 (1998)	Sweet Life (1999)	Tenderland (2003)

Singles from Sweet Life
- 1. "I'm Gonna Make You Love Me" Released: 1999

Sweet Life is the tenth studio album by Australian soul and R&B singer Renée Geyer. The album was released in March 1999 and peaked at number 50 on the ARIA Charts.

At the ARIA Music Awards of 1999, the album was nominated for Best Adult Contemporary Album.

== Track listing ==
1. "Best Times" (Renée Geyer, Kenneth Crouch) – 4:47
2. "Heaven (The Closest I'll Get)" (Geyer, John Clifforth) – 4:47
3. "You Broke a Beautiful Thing" (Paul Kelly) – 5:17
4. "I'm Gonna Make You Love Me (featuring CBD) (Jerry Ross, Kenneth Gamble, Danny Williams) – 3:22
5. "From Now On" (Geyer, John Clifforth, Michael den Elzen) – 4:27
6. "Play Me" (featuring Paul Kelly) (Kelly) – 4:13
7. "Knowing You Were Loved" (Peter Milton Walsh) – 4:30
8. "Cake and the Candle" (Kelly) – 4:12
9. "Don't Be So Sad" (Geyer, Clifforth) – 4:50
10. "Killer Lover" (Kelly) – 4:27
11. "My Back Room" (Dan Warner, Dror Erez) – 3:25

== Charts ==
Chart (1999)	Peak position
Australian Albums (ARIA)	50

== Release history ==
Region	Date	Format	Edition(s)	Label	Catalogue
Australia	March 1999	CD	Standard	Mushroom Records	MUSH33214.2
