= Seven Deadly Sins (miniseries) =

Australian anthology television series

- Genre: Drama
- Written by: Glenda Adams ("Pride", "Wrath"); Andrew Bovell ("Lust"); Joanna Murray-Smith ("Greed"); Hannie Rayson ("Sloth"); Keith Thompson ("Gluttony", "Envy")
- Directed by: Ken Cameron ("Lust"); Gale Edwards ("Pride"); Julian Pringle ("Wrath"); Jackie McKimmie ("Sloth"); Alison Maclean ("Greed"); Stephen Wallace ("Envy"); Di Drew ("Gluttony")
- Starring: Hugo Weaving ("Lust"); Colin Friels ("Pride"); Elizabeth Alexander ("Pride"); Steve Bisley ("Sloth"); Vince Colosimo ("Sloth"); Robyn Nevin ("Sloth"); Gosia Dobrowolska ("Greed"); Caroline Gillmer ("Greed"); Kim Gyngell ("Greed"); Marshall Napier ("Greed"); Pamela Rabe ("Greed"); Genevieve Lemon ("Envy"); Belinda McClory ("Envy"); Gia Carides ("Gluttony"); Richard Roxburgh ("Gluttony")
- Music by: Martin Armiger, Paul Grabowsky
- Country of origin: Australia
- Original language: English
- No. of seasons: 1
- No. of episodes: 7

Production
- Producer: Bob Weiss
- Running time: 48mins (approximately)

Original release
- Network: ABC Television
- Release: 23 February – 25 March 1993

Seven Deadly Sins is a 1993 Australian television drama anthology series aired by ABC Television.

The stories examine the dark side of human nature in seven episodes: "Lust", "Pride", "Wrath", "Sloth", "Greed", "Envy", and "Gluttony" — the seven deadly sins. A soundtrack was released by ABC Music, featuring vocals by artists Paul Kelly, Renée Geyer, Vika Bull, and Deborah Conway.

In the same year, ABC TV screened a series of short films under the same name, produced and directed by Stephen Burstow, comprising dance works commissioned from leading contemporary choreographers.

== Cast ==
=== Lust ===
- Andy Anderson as Colin
- Hugo Weaving as Eric
- Victoria Longley as Deirdre
- Heather Mitchell as Belinda
- David Roberts as Alistair
- Judy McIntosh as Frida

=== Pride ===
- Colin Friels as Roger Pascoe
- Elizabeth Alexander as Jill Pascoe
- Linden Wilkinson
- Beth Champion

=== Sloth ===
- Steve Bisley as Meadowvale Supervisor
- Vince Colosimo as Tony
- Robyn Nevin as Margot
- Frank Gallacher as Elliot
- Monica Maughan as Lorna
- Bob Baines as Ray

=== Greed ===
- Pamela Rabe as Laura
- Marshall Napier as Tom
- Kim Gyngell as William
- Caroline Gillmer as Rachel
- Claudia Black
- Gosia Dobrowolska

=== Envy ===
- Belinda McClory
- Genevieve Lemon as Envy
- Lech Mackiewicz as Andre
- Roslyn Oades

=== Gluttony ===
- Gia Carides as Gina
- Richard Roxburgh as Mark
- Lynne McGranger as Gluttony
- Deborah Conway as Party Guest
- Paul Kelly as Party Guest
- Vincent Gil
- Anni Finsterer
- Geneviève Picot as Eve
- Steve Jacobs
- Paul Blackwell
- Abe Forsythe as Dead Child
- Diarmid Heidenreich
- Frank Gallacher as Elliott
- Betty Lucas
- Heather Mitchell

== Production ==
Seven Deadly Sins was pitched to Penny Chapman, then head of drama at the Australian Broadcasting Corporation, by script editor Barbara Masel. Her idea was to create a series of stories that would "let the moral compass spin". Masel was also interested in encouraging the audience to identify with behaviour they would not normally condone and "that all of the characters in each episode should manifest the sin". With Chapman on board and Bob Weis appointed as series producer, Masel found writers. When outlines and drafts were completed, the directors were brought on board. P. J. Hogan ("Sloth") and Alison Maclean ("Greed") were selected as directors before their international careers had taken off, while Gale Edwards ("Pride") had until then had only ever directed for the theatre. The series was broadcast at 9.30pm because of the language used. The series rated well, pulling the biggest audience ever for an ABC drama program in that time slot.

== Soundtrack ==
Seven Deadly Sins

Soundtrack album by Paul Kelly, Renée Geyer, Vika Bull, and Deborah Conway
- Released: February 1993
- Label: Australian Broadcasting Corporation
- Producer: Martin Armiger

Paul Kelly albums chronology
Live, May 1992 (1992)	Seven Deadly Sins (1993)	Wanted Man (1994)

Renée Geyer album chronology
Renée Live at the Basement (1986)	Seven Deadly Sins (1993)	Difficult Woman (1994)

Vika Bull album chronology
Seven Deadly Sins (1993)	Vika and Linda (1994)

Deborah Conway album chronology
String of Pearls (1991)	Seven Deadly Sins (1993)	Bitch Epic (1993)

A soundtrack was released by ABC Music and produced by Martin Armiger. It features vocals by artists Paul Kelly, Renée Geyer, Vika Bull, and Deborah Conway, with arrangements by Derek Williams. The album peaked at number 71 on the ARIA Charts.

Geyer's version of "Crazy" was released as the lead single. "He Can't Decide" was released as the second and final single in 1993.

=== Track listing ===
CD/Cassette
No.	Title	Writer(s)	Vocals	Length
1.	"He Can't Decide"	P. Kelly/M. Armiger	Paul Kelly, Renée Geyer, Vika Bull and Deborah Conway	3:31
2.	"Almost Persuaded"	G. Sutton/B. Sherrill	Paul Kelly	3:05
3.	"Imagine the World"	M. Armiger/P. Kelly	Deborah Conway, Renée Geyer	6:00
4.	"I Can't See Me Without You"	C. Twitty	Deborah Conway	2:41
5.	"Ugly Woman"	Raphael de Leon	Paul Kelly	2:40
6.	"Foggy Highway"	P. Kelly	Renée Geyer	3:27
7.	"Don't Break it I Say"	Kelly/Conway/Geyer/Armiger	Deborah Conway, Paul Kelly, Renée Geyer	4:10
8.	"She's Got You"	H. Cochran	Deborah Conway	3:00
9.	"Crazy"	Willie Nelson	Renée Geyer	4:13
10.	"Maybe this Time"	P. Kelly/M. Armiger	Vika Bull	3:34
11.	"My Friends Say Fool"	W. Mason	Renée Geyer	3:32
12.	"In April"	D. Conway	Renée Geyer	3:30
13.	"Someday I'll Take Home the Roses"	Jean Stafford	Renée Geyer	3:43

=== Charts ===
Chart (1993)	Peak position
Australian (ARIA Charts)	71

== Dance film series ==
Also in 1993, ABC TV screened seven works by leading contemporary choreographers, with the series title as well as the segments carrying the same title as the miniseries. The series was produced and directed by Stephen Burstow, (Note: "Stephen Burstow is a Sydney-based visual artist, lecturer and filmmaker. As a director he has specialised in performing arts projects for film, television and digital media. His dance films have been awarded internationally". He is also co-creator of Bush Tucker Man (TV series, 1988–2006).) and each of the seven films were seven minutes long. The seven works were:

- "Lust", choreographed by Graeme Watson with One Extra Company
- "Avarice", choreographed by Leigh Warren with Australian Dance Theatre
- "Sloth", choreographed by Meryl Tankard with Meryl Tankard Company
- "Envy", choreographed by Paul Mercurio with Australian Choreographic Ensemble
- "Wrath", choreographed by Chrissie Parrott with Chrissie Parrott Dance Company
- "Gluttony", choreographed by Kai Tai Chan for Sydney Dance Company
- "Pride", choreographed by Stephen Page for Bangarra Dance Theatre
