= Dedicated (Renée Geyer album) =

Studio album by Renée Geyer
- Released: 29 September 2007
- Genres: Blues; jazz; funk; R&B
- Length: 46:44
- Label: Capitol Records / EMI Music
- Producers: Adam Rhodes, Renée Geyer

Renée Geyer chronology
Tonight (2005)	Dedicated (2007)	Renéessance (2009)

Singles from Dedicated
- 1. "I Wish It Would Rain" Released: August 2007

Dedicated is the thirteenth studio album by Australian soul and R&B singer Renée Geyer. The album is predominantly a covers album, with two new tracks written by Paul Kelly. The album was released in September 2007 and peaked at number 53 on the ARIA Charts.

Geyer toured the album throughout Australia from October to December 2007.

== Reception ==
Bernard Zuel from Sydney Morning Herald said; "Dedicated is perfectly capable of standing on its own terms as an album of diverse origins, very fine playing and production and a voice in boisterous and sometimes quite wicked form." Zuel praised the two new Kelly tracking saying they "...find Geyer digging deep and extracting heart-crushing richness" and "Why Can't We Live Together" which Zuel said "is one long smouldering fire" while "Distant Lover" "has all the smoothness of the best early '70s smoky soul".

Megan Smith from Out in Perth said; "Renée Geyer has a lot of soul, there is no doubt about that, whether breathing life into classic R&B tracks or giving voice for the first time to the latest thing penned by Paul Kelly, Renee is flawless in her ability to give voice to every last bit of passionate emotion a song is capable of. On some tracks the emotions evoked are drastically different from the original. Such is the case on the first single "I Wish It Would Rain", originally by The Temptations, where she opts for brass over the strings of the original and creates a jamming, playful tune. On other tracks, such as Marvin Gaye’s "Distant Lover" she pays homage to the song's creator, taking her voice from impassioned pleading to smooth as fine whiskey."

On 24 September 2007, Dedicated was Radio National's Tim Ritchie's album of the week with Ritchie saying "She's a woman who can find that special thing in a song and make it her own."

== Track listing ==
1. "Why Can't We Live Together" (Timmy Thomas) – 4:41
2. "I Wish It Would Rain" (Norman Whitfield, Barrett Strong, Roger Penzabene) – 4:13
3. "Please Leave Your Light On" (Paul Kelly) – 3:51
4. "Somebody's On Your Case" (Earl Randle) – 4:10
5. "Dedicated to the One I Love" (Lowman Pauling, Ralph Bass) – 4:02
6. "When a Woman Loves a Man" (Kelly) – 4:36
7. "Steal Away" (Jimmy Hughes) – 3:38
8. "A Beautiful Morning" (Eddie Brigati, Felix Cavaliere) – 3:11
9. "So I Can Love You" (Sheila Hutchinson) – 3:52
10. "Distant Lover" (Gwen Gordy Fuqua, Marvin Gaye, Sandra Greene) – 4:01
11. "It's a Man's Man's Man's World" (James Brown, Betty Newsome) – 6:39

== Personnel ==
- Brad Pinto, Danny Williams, Gary Pinto, Janine Maunder, Jude Nicholas, Kylie Auldist, Rebecca Barnard, Tania Doco – backing vocals
- Yuri Pavlinov – bass
- Daniel Farrugia – drums
- Lydia Davies, Sam Keevers – piano
- Jeff Burstin, Mark Punch, Ross Hanford,- guitar
- Greg Spence, Jordan Murray, Paul Williamson – horns
- Bruce Haymes – keyboard, organ, synthesiser
- Chong Nee – vocoder

== Charts ==
Chart (2007)	Peak position
Australian Albums (ARIA)	53

== Release history ==
Region	Date	Format	Edition(s)	Label	Catalogue
Australia	29 September 2007	CD; digital download	Standard	Capitol Records / EMI Music	5094972
