= Moving Along =

Studio album by Renée Geyer
- Released: May 1977
- Recorded: 1976–77
- Studio: Crystal Sound, Los Angeles
- Genre: Funk; soul; disco
- Length: 35:34
- Label: RCA/ Mushroom (Australia/UK); Polydor (US)
- Producer: Frank Wilson

Renée Geyer chronology
Really Really Love You: Live at the Dallas Brooks Hall (1976)	Moving Along (1977)	Renée Geyer at Her Very Best (1977)

Singles from Moving Along
- 1. "Stares and Whispers" Released: April 1977; 2. "Tender Hooks" Released: July 1977; 3. "Moving Along" Released: 1977

Moving Along (self-titled in the US) is the fourth studio album by Australian soul/R&B singer Renée Geyer, and her first to be recorded in the US and released internationally. It was produced by famed Motown musician Frank Wilson who assembled the cream of US session players to back Geyer. Some notables were members of Stevie Wonder's band including Nathan Watts, Ray Parker Jr., Motown's most famous bass guitarist and Funk Brother James Jamerson, on backing vocals, Venetta Fields, and Mal and Barry from The Renée Geyer Band at Geyer's insistence. For this album, she re-recorded her Australian hit "Heading in the Right Direction" for the US market.

== Reception ==
Cash Box magazine said "Geyer is an Australian songstress with dynamic interpretive qualities in her voice and material that ranged from disco to MOR. Already with an established reputation in her homeland... she seems poised and ready for a listen by the Yanks."

== Track listing ==
Vinyl/ cassette (VPL1-0140 / PD-1-6101, 2391 275)

Side One

1. "Heading in the Right Direction" (Mark Punch, Garry Paige) – 3.00
2. "Be There in the Morning" (Renée Geyer, Mal Logan, Barry Sullivan) – 4.27
3. "Quicker Than the Eye" (Harry Booker, Judy Wieder) – 4.09
4. "Tender Hooks" (Ruth Copeland, Eric Thorngren) – 4.09

Side Two

1. "Stares and Whispers" (John Footman, Frank Wilson, Terri McFadden) – 4.09
2. "Just to Make Love to You" (Greg Poree, Gralin Jerald) – 4.09
3. "Touch" (Frank Wilson, Pam Sawyer) – 4.09
4. "Moving Along" (Renée Geyer, Mal Logan, Barry Sullivan, Judy Wieder) – 6:11

== Personnel ==
- Mal Logan - keyboards
- Barry 'Big Goose' Sullivan - bass guitar
- Ray Parker Jr., Greg Poree, Stephen Beckmeier - guitar
- Harry Booker, Jerry Peters - keyboards
- Reginald Burke - piano
- James Jamerson, Nathan Watts - bass
- Raymond Pounds - drums
- Venetta Fields, Sherlie Matthews, Pat Henerson, Tiemeyer McCain, Otis Stokes, Frank Wilson - backing vocals

== Charts ==
Weekly chart performance for Moving Along
Chart (1977)	Peak position
Australian Albums (Kent Music Report)	11
