= It's a Man's Man's World =

Studio album by Renée Geyer
- Released: August 1974
- Studio: Bill Armstrong Studios, Melbourne, Australia
- Genre: Funk; R&B; soul
- Length: 47:29
- Label: RCA
- Producer: Tweed Harris

Renée Geyer chronology
Renée Geyer (1973)	It's a Man's Man's World (1974)	Ready to Deal (1975)

Singles from It's a Man's Man's World
- 1. "What Do I Do on Sunday Morning?" Released: August 1974; 2. "It's a Man's Man's World" Released: November 1974; 3. "Take Me Where You Took Me Last Night" Released: May 1975

It's a Man's Man's World is the second studio album by Australian soul/R&B singer Renée Geyer. The album was released in August 1974 and peaked at number 28 on the Kent Music Report.

== Track listing ==
Vinyl/ cassette (MVPL1-0024G)

Side one

1. "It's a Man's Man's World" (James Brown) – 3.42
2. "They Tell Me of an Unclouded Day" (Jackie Moore, Dave Crawford, Brad Shapiro) – 3.42
3. "Take Me Where You Took Me Last Night" (Dee Ervin, Lynne Farr) – 3.53
4. "Since I Fell for You" (Buddy Johnson) – 3.42
5. "What Do I Do on Sunday Morning?" (Dennis Lambert, Brian Potter) – 3.58
6. "Love the Way You Love" (Mark Punch, Garry Paige) – 3:08
7. "Scarlet Ribbons" (Evelyn Danzig, Jack Segal) – 2.45

Side Two

1. "Do Your Thing" (Isaac Hayes) – 3.44
2. "And I Love Him" (John Lennon, Paul McCartney) – 5.14
3. "It's Been a Long Time" (Melvin Wilson, James Baker) – 3.23
4. "Mama's Little Girl" (Dennis Lambert, Brian Potter) – 3.26
5. "Once in a Lifetime Thing" (Jim Weatherly) – 3.33
6. "Feel Good" (Alan Ciner) – 3.15

== Personnel ==
- Renée Geyer – vocals, backing vocals
- Phil Manning – guitars
- Tim Gaze – guitars
- Steve Murphy – guitars
- Tony Naylor – guitars
- Tweed Harris – keyboards
- Barry "Big Goose" Sullivan – bass guitar
- Mike Kelly – bass guitar
- Geoff Cox – drums
- Julie McKenna, Wendy Reece, Bobby Bright, Mike Brady – background vocals
- Garry Hyde – percussion

== Charts ==
Weekly chart performance for It's a Man's Man's World
Chart (1974–1975)	Peak position
Australian Albums (Kent Music Report)	28
