= Really Really Love You: Live at the Dallas Brooks Hall =

Live album by Renée Geyer Band
- Released: August 1976
- Recorded: 11 April 1976, Dallas Brooks Hall, Melbourne, Australia
- Genre: Rock; funk; blues; soul
- Label: RCA/ Mushroom
- Producer: Renée Geyer Band; Ern Rose

Renée Geyer Band chronology
Ready to Deal (1975)	Really Really Love You: Live at the Dallas Brooks Hall (1976)	Moving Along (1977)

Singles from Really Really Love You: Live at the Dallas Brooks Hall
- 1. "Shakey Ground" / "It Only Happens" Released: September 1976

Really Really Love You: Live at the Dallas Brooks Hall is the first live album by Australian soul musician Renée Geyer. This is the second and final album credited to the Renée Geyer Band. The album was recorded in April 1976 as her 'farewell' concert, before relocating to the United States.

== Track listing ==
Vinyl/ cassette (VPL10120G)

Side one

1. "Hard Head" (Johnny "Guitar" Watson) – 5.33
2. "Shakey Ground" (Jeffrey Bowen, Edward Hazel, Al Boyd) – 4.38
3. "Person to Person" (Hamish Stuart, Alan Gorrie, Roger Ball, Malcolm Duncan, Robbie Macintosh) – 4.08
4. "It Only Happens" (with Doug Williams) (Mickey Denne, Ken Gold) – 4.18

Side Two

1. "Booty" (Sylvester Stewart) – 5.06
2. "Masquerade" (Herb Magidson, Allie Wrubel) – 6.41
3. "Really, Really... Love You" (Renée Geyer Band) – 11.08

== Charts ==
Chart (1976)	Peak position
Australian Albums (Kent Music Report)	43

== Personnel ==
Renée Geyer Band

- Renée Geyer – vocals, backing vocals
- John Pugh – guitars
- Mal Logan – keyboards
- Barry "Big Goose" Sullivan – bass guitar
- Greg Tell – drums

Horn section

- Russell Smith – trumpet
- Bruce Sandell – saxophones
- Miguel Carranza – trombone
