= Do You Know What I Mean =

1971 song by Lee Michaels

Single by Lee Michaels

from the album 5th
- B-side: "Keep the Circle Turning"
- Released: May 1971
- Genre: Classic Rock
- Length: 3:11
- Label: A&M
- Songwriter: Lee Michaels
- Producer: Lee Michaels

Lee Michaels singles chronology
"What Now America" (1970)	"Do You Know What I Mean" (1971)	"Can I Get a Witness" (1971)

"Do You Know What I Mean" is a song written and performed by Lee Michaels. It was produced by Michaels.

It reached #6 on the U.S. Billboard Hot 100 and #4 on the Cash Box Top 100 in the summer of 1971. The song was featured on his 1971 album, 5th. The single ranked #19 on Billboard's Year-End Hot 100 singles of 1971.

In the song, the narrator finds his girlfriend having an affair with his best friend. He asks her why she left him, and she explains that because he had not shown his love for her for four years, she felt hurt, and tells him to find someone new.

== Chart performance ==
=== Weekly charts ===
Chart (1971)	Peak position
Australia (Kent Music Report)	26
Canada RPM Top Singles	12
U.S. Billboard Hot 100	6
U.S. Cash Box Top 100	4

=== Year-end charts ===
Chart (1971)	Rank
Canada	78
U.S. Billboard Hot 100	19
U.S. Cash Box	52

== Renée Geyer version ==
"Do You Know What I Mean"

Single by Renée Geyer

from the album So Lucky
- B-side: "Good Lovin'"
- Released: October 1981
- Recorded: 1981
- Studio: Shangrila Studios, Los Angeles
- Genre: Jazz; soul; funk; synth-pop
- Length: 3:20
- Label: Mushroom Records
- Songwriter: Lee Michaels
- Producer: Rob Fraboni

Renée Geyer singles chronology
"Say I Love You" (1981)	"Do You Know What I Mean" (1981)	"I Can Feel the Fire" (1982)

Australian musician Renée Geyer recorded a version in 1981. The song was released in October 1981 as the second single from her seventh studio album, So Lucky. The song peaked at #29 on the Australian Kent Music Report and in New Zealand.

=== Track listing ===
Australian 7" Single

- Side A "Do You Know What I Mean" - 3:20
- Side B "Good Lovin'" - 3:34

=== Charts ===
Chart (1981/82)	Peak position
Australia (Kent Music Report)	29
New Zealand (Recorded Music NZ)	29

== Other versions ==
- Simon Turner, on his 1973 album, Simon Turner.
- Gwen McCrae, as a single in 1984 which reached #83 on the U.S. R&B chart.
- Myles Goodwyn - featuring Lee Aaron - as a single in 1988; it reached #47 in Canada. It was featured on his album, Myles Goodwyn.
- Kevin Naquin and the Ossun Playboys on the 2014 album, No Guarantee.
