= Ready to Deal =

Studio album by Renée Geyer Band
- Released: November 1975
- Recorded: August – September 1975
- Studio: Armstrongs Studios, Melbourne
- Genre: Jazz; funk; rock; soul
- Length: 40.33
- Label: RCA/Mushroom
- Producer: Renée Geyer Band, Ernie Rose

Renée Geyer Band chronology
It's a Man's Man's World (1974)	Ready to Deal (1975)	Really Really Love You: Live at the Dallas Brooks Hall (1976)

Singles from Ready to Deal
- 1. "(I Give You) Sweet Love" Released: October 1975; 2. "Heading in the Right Direction" Released: December 1975; 3. "If Loving You Is Wrong" Released: March 1976

Ready to Deal is the third studio album by Australian singer Renée Geyer. The album was released in November 1975 and peaked at number 21, becoming Geyer's highest-charting album. The album is credited to Renée Geyer Band. The album features the track "Heading in the Right Direction" which became Geyer's first top 40 single in 1976.

"Sweet Love" featured in the 2000 film Chopper starring Eric Bana.

In October 2010, Ready to Deal was listed in the book, 100 Best Australian Albums.

== Track listing ==
Vinyl/ cassette (VPL1-0105)

Side one

1. "Sweet Love" (Renée Geyer, Mal Logan, Barry Sullivan, Mark Punch, Greg Tell) – 3.22
2. "If Loving You Is Wrong" (Homer Banks, Raymond Jackson, Carl Hampton) – 4.22
3. "Spilt Milk" (Logan, Geyer, Sullivan, Tell, Punch) – 5.02
4. "Whoop" (Logan, Geyer, Sullivan, Tell, Punch) – 6.53

Side Two

1. "Heading in the Right Direction" (Garry Paige, Punch) – 4.04
2. "Two Sides" (Geyer, Logan, Sullivan, Punch, Tell) – 3.32
3. "Ready to Deal" (Geyer, Logan, Sullivan, Punch, Tell) – 3.32
4. "Love's Got a Hold" (Geyer, Logan, Punch, Sullivan, Tell) – 3.48
5. "I Really Love You (Geyer, Logan, Sullivan, Punch, Tell) – 5.55

== Personnel ==
Renée Geyer Band members

- Renée Geyer — vocals, backing vocals
- Mal Logan – keyboards
- Mark Punch – guitar
- Barry "Big Goose" Sullivan – bass guitar
- Greg Tell – drums

Additional musicians

- Tony Buchanan – saxophone, flute
- Russell Smith – trumpet

== Charts ==
Weekly chart performance for Ready to Deal
Chart (1975–1976)	Peak position
Australian Albums (Kent Music Report)	21
