= Stares and Whispers (song) =

Single by Renée Geyer

from the album Moving Along
- A-side: "Stares and Whispers"
- B-side: "Be There in the Morning"
- Released: April 1977
- Recorded: 1977
- Studio: Chrystal Studios, Hollywood
- Genre: Funk music, soul
- Length: 3:33
- Label: RCA Records, Mushroom Records
- Songwriter(s): John Footman, Frank Wilson, Terri McFadden
- Producer(s): Frank Wilson

Renée Geyer singles chronology
| "Leave My Body Alone" (1976) | "Stares and Whispers" (1977) | "Tender Hooks" (1977) |

"Stares and Whispers" is a song by the Australian Renée Geyer Band. The song was released in April 1977 as the lead single from Geyer's fourth studio album Moving Along (1977); her first to be recorded in the US and released internationally. It became Geyer's first Australian top 20 single, peaking at number 17 on the Kent Music Report.

In April 1977, Geyer performed the song on the 100th episode of the Australian TV show Countdown, which she also co-hosted.

== Track listing ==
Australian 7" Single

- Side A "Stares and Whispers" - 3:33
- Side B "Be There in the Morning" - 4:24

== Charts ==
=== Weekly charts ===
| Chart (1977) | Peak position |
|---|---|
| Australia (Kent Music Report) | 17 |

=== Year-end charts ===
| Chart (1977) | Position |
|---|---|
| Australia (Kent Music Report) | 90 |

== Cover versions ==
- Freda Payne covered the song for her album Stares and Whispers (1977).
- Alton McClain and Destiny covered the song on the album More of You (1979)
