= Say I Love You (song) =

Single by Eddy Grant

from the album Walking on Sunshine
- B-side: "Say I Love You" (Disco Version)
- Released: 14 July 1978
- Studio: The Coach House Recording Studios, Stamford Hill, London
- Length: 3:54
- Label: Ice
- Songwriter: Eddy Grant
- Producer: Eddy Grant

Eddy Grant singles chronology
"Say I Love You" (1978)	"Walking on Sunshine" (1979)

"Say I Love You" is a song written by Eddy Grant in 1979. The song, which was a hit in Nigeria, was first released on Grant's 1979 album Walking on Sunshine. The original B-side was a disco version of the song. A twelve-minute version in Yoruba, titled "Wipe Mo Nfe E" and also penned by Grant, was also recorded and later appeared on the B-side of the 12" version of his later single "War Party".

== Renée Geyer version ==
"Say I Love You"

Single by Renée Geyer

from the album So Lucky
- B-side: "Bad Side of the Blues"
- Released: 25 May 1981
- Recorded: December 1980
- Studio: Shangrila Studios, Los Angeles
- Genre: Pop rock; post-disco; synth-pop
- Length: 3:30
- Label: Mushroom Records
- Songwriter: Eddy Grant
- Producer: Rob Fraboni

Renée Geyer singles chronology
"Hot Minutes" (1980)	"Say I Love You" (1981)	"Do You Know What I Mean" (1981)

Australian musician Renée Geyer recorded a version in December 1980. The song was released in May 1981 as the lead single from her seventh studio album, So Lucky. The song peaked at number 5 on the Australian Kent Music Report and at number 1 in New Zealand.

=== Track listing ===
Australian 7" Single

- Side A "Say I Love You"
- Side B "Bad Side of the Blues"

International 7" Single

- Side A "Say I Love You" - 3:30
- Side B "Good Lovin'" - 3:34

=== Charts ===
==== Weekly charts ====
Chart (1981/82)	Peak position
Australia (Kent Music Report)	5
New Zealand (Recorded Music NZ)	1

==== Year-end charts ====
Chart (1981)	Position
Australia (Kent Music Report)	40

== Other versions ==
- Lenny Zakatek released the song as a single in 1982.
- Groove 21/20 remixed "Say I Love You", featuring Renée Geyer, which was released as the lead single to promote her album, The Best of Renee Geyer 1973-1998 (1998).

== See also ==
- List of number-one singles from the 1980s (New Zealand)
