= Heading in the Right Direction =

Single by Renée Geyer Band

from the album Ready to Deal
- A-side: "Heading in the Right Direction"
- B-side: "Love's Got a Hold"
- Released: December 1975
- Recorded: 1975
- Studio: Armstrongs Studios, Melbourne
- Genre: Funk; soul
- Length: 3:59
- Label: Mushroom Records
- Songwriter(s): Garry Paige; Mark Punch
- Producer(s): Ernie Rose and Renee Geyer Band

Renée Geyer Band singles chronology
"(I Give You) Sweet Love" (1975)	"Heading in the Right Direction" (1975)	"If Loving You Is Wrong" (1976)

"Heading in the Right Direction" is an Australian song written by Garry Paige and Mark Punch. It was first recorded by the Johnny Rocco Band in 1975 Originally sang by Leo Decastro and made famous by the Renée Geyer Band later that year. Geyer's version was released in December 1975 as the second single from her third studio album Ready to Deal. It became Geyer's first top 40 single, peaking at number 31 on the Kent Music Report.

== Reception ==
Cash Box magazine in 1977 said "This is a R&B flavoured ballad though Ms. Geyer's vocal inflection does not lean in that direction. A classy production and a good hook."

== Track listing ==
Australian 7" Single (102672)

- Side A "Heading in the Right Direction" - 3:59
- Side B "Love's Got a Hold" - 3:47

== Charts ==
Chart (1975/76)	Peak position
Australia (Kent Music Report)	31

== Cover versions ==
- Bettye Swann released the song as a single on Atlantic Records in 1976.
- Marilyn Ali covered the song in 1999.
- John Farnham covered the song on his album, I Remember When I Was Young (2005).
- Lucy Durack covered the song and released a version as the lead single from her self-titled album. (2012).
