= Cammeraygal =

Indigenous Australian clan

Cammeraygal people
- aka: Cam-mer-ray-gal, Camerray-ga, Camera-gal, Cammeraa, Cam-meray, Kemmirai-gal, Gamaraigal, Cameragal, Kem:arai, Kemmaraigal and Kameraigal (referring to a group) (AIATSIS), nd (SIL)
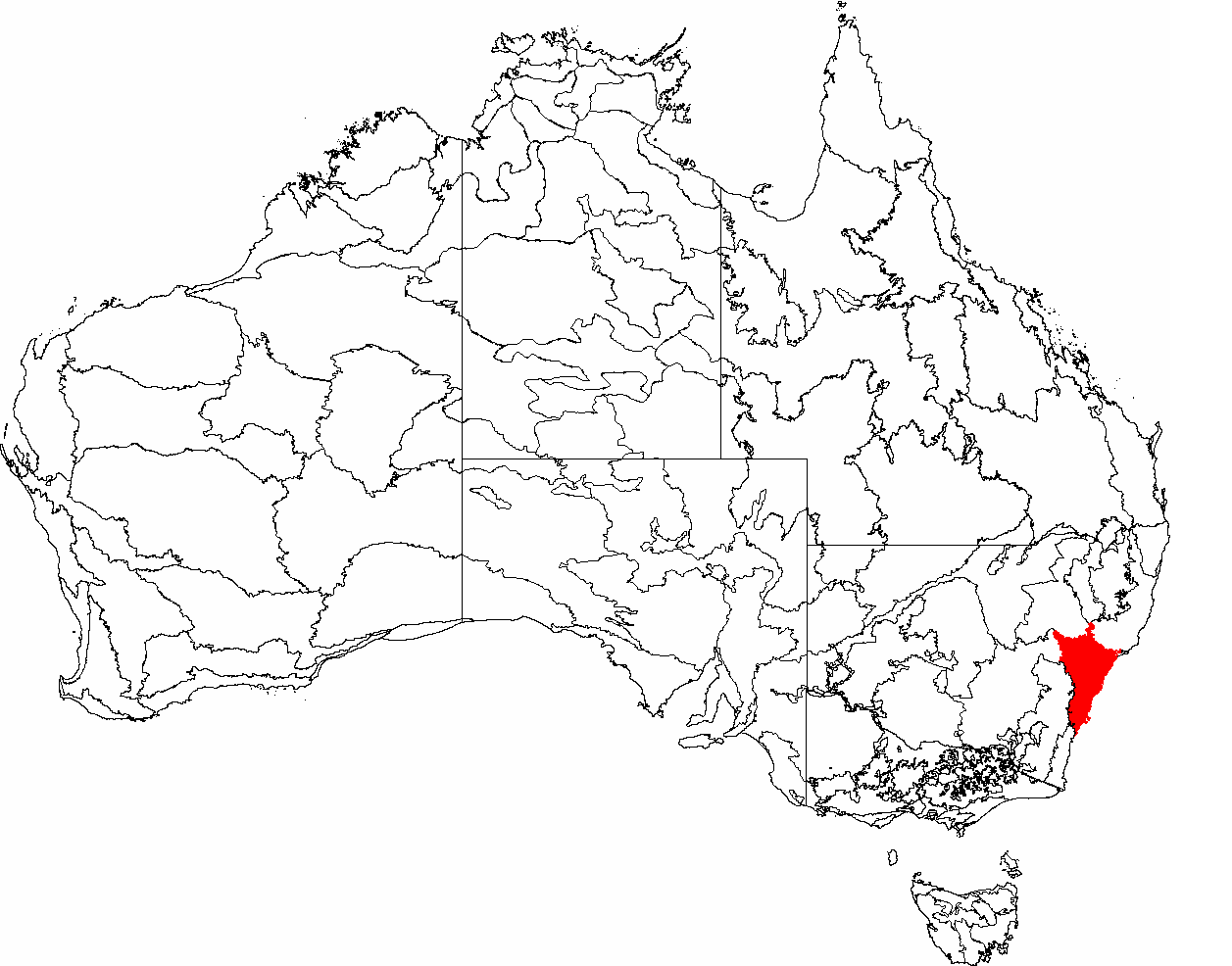
- The traditional lands of the Cammeraygal people were located in the Sydney Basin bioregion

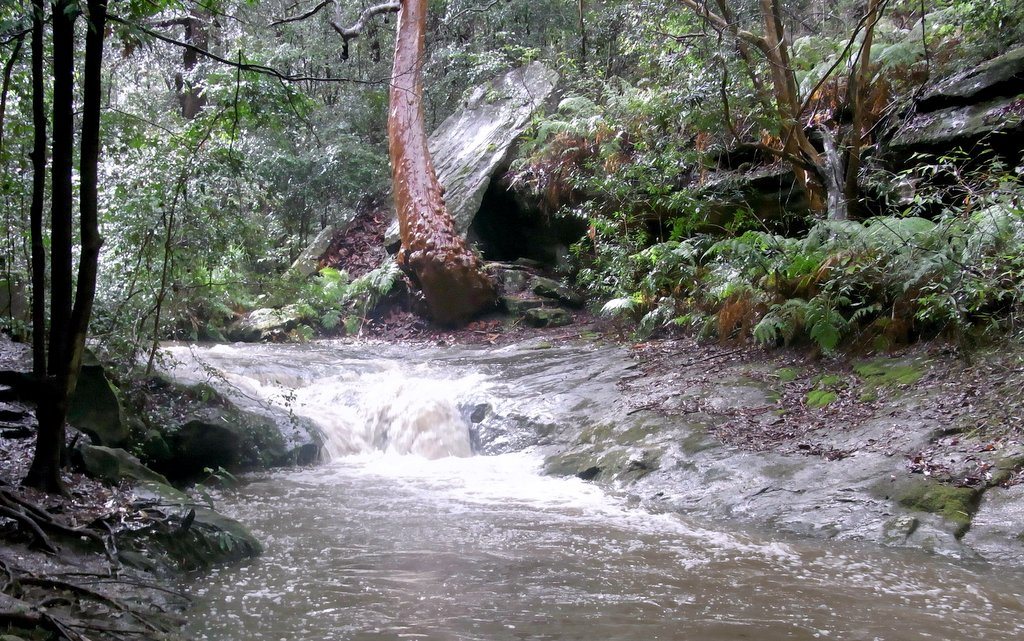
- A cave known to shelter Cammeraygal people at Chatswood West

Hierarchy
- Language family: Pama–Nyungan
- Language branch: Yuin–Kuric
- Language group: Yora
- Group dialects: Dharug (also called Eora)

Area
- Bioregion: Sydney Basin
- Location: Lower North Shore of Sydney, New South Wales, Australia
- Coordinates: 33°50′S 151°12′E
- Urban areas: Brookvale; Chatswood; Manly; North Sydney; Waverton; Willoughby

Notable individuals
- Barangaroo; Cammerragal; Cammerragalleon

The Cammeraygal, variously spelled as Cam-mer-ray-gal, Gamaraigal, Kameraigal, Cameragal and several other variations, are one clan of the 29 Darug tribes who are united by a common language, strong ties of kinship and survived as skilled hunter–fisher–gatherers in family groups or clans that inhabited the Lower North Shore of Sydney, New South Wales, Australia.

== Traditional lands and customs ==
The traditional lands of the Cammeraygal people are now contained within much of the North Sydney, Willoughby, Mosman, Manly and Warringah local government areas. The Cammeraygal people lived in the area until the 1820s and are recorded as being in the northern parts of the Sydney region for approximately 5,800 years.

According to early British colonial texts, the Cammeraygal were considered to be the socially dominant clan in the Sydney region. Cammeraygal men conducted the initiation ceremonies over the youths of the neighbouring Gadigal clan which involved the ritual extraction of an upper anterior central incisor tooth.

== Legacy ==
The suburb of Cammeray and Cammeraygal High School, located in the suburb of Crows Nest, are named after the Cammeraygal people. The name Cammeraygal is ensigned on the North Sydney Council emblem. In 1999, North Sydney Council erected a monument in honour of the Cammeraygal tribe, the traditional owners of the North Sydney area.

== Notable Cammeraygal people ==
- Barangaroo, the second wife of Bennelong
- Musquito, a resistance leader, convict hunter and outlaw
- Arabanoo, kidnapped Aboriginal man and intended envoy, a member of the Kai’ymay clan of the Cammeraygal people
- Patyegarang, a guide and language teacher to colonist William Dawes
- Tommy Chaseland, Aboriginal sealer and sailor active in Australia and New Zealand, possibly of Cammeraygal descent
- Dennis Foley, academic and historian

== See also ==
- List of Indigenous Australian group names

== Sources ==
- "1790s". A history of Aboriginal Sydney. University of Sydney. 11 July 2014.
- Attenbrow, Val (2010). Sydney's Aboriginal past: investigating the archaeological and historical records. Sydney: UNSW Press. p. 22. ISBN 978-1742231167. OCLC 659579866.
- "Barangaroo, a Cameragal woman of courage" (PDF). Annual Report. Sydney: Barangaroo Delivery Authority. 2011. p. 7. Archived from the original (PDF) on 20 March 2012.
- "The Cammeraygals". Monuments Australia. 1999.
- Collins, David. "Appendix". An account of the English Colony in New South Wales (PDF) (PDF). Vol. 1. sub. V. ISBN 0-589-07168-8.
- Dousset, Laurent (2005). "Eora". AusAnthrop Australian Aboriginal tribal database. Archived from the original on 16 October 2014.
- "History". Cameragal Montessori School. 2013.
- Hoskins, Ian (2019). "Aboriginal North Sydney" (requires download) (PDF). North Sydney Council.
- "Language information: Eora". Australian Indigenous Languages Database. AIATSIS. 26 June 2012.
- Tindale, Norman Barnett (1974). Aboriginal Tribes of Australia: Their Terrain, Environmental Controls, Distribution, Limits, and Proper Names. Australian National University Press. ISBN 978-0-708-10741-6.
- Walker, Frank (13 July 2008). "Ancient spirits lifted". The Sydney Morning Herald.
