= North Sydney High School =

North Sydney High School may refer to:

- North Sydney Girls High School
- North Sydney Boys High School
