= Crows Nest Boys High School =

Location
- Crows Nest, New South Wales; Australia; 33°49′49″S 151°12′12″E

Information
- Type: Public, single-sex, secondary school
- Motto: Honour before Honours
- Established: January 1883 (SLNPS); July 1910 (CNPS); January 1936 (CNCJTS); January 1959 (CNBHS)
- Status: Closed
- Closed: December 1992
- Sister school: Cremorne Girls High School
- Oversight: NSW Department of Education
- Campus: 365 Pacific Highway
- Colours: Maroon and gold

Crows Nest Boys High School (abbreviation CNBHS) is a former high school located at 365 Pacific Highway in the Sydney suburb of Crows Nest, New South Wales, Australia. It was a boys' high school operated by the New South Wales Department of Education with students from years 7 to 12. The school was first established in 1883 as St Leonards North Public School. However, the school was declared surplus to the needs of the department and officially closed in 1992. The school and its heritage-listed buildings are now the campus of North Sydney Girls High School.

== History ==
=== 1883: establishment as St Leonards North Public School ===
The school was first established in 1883 as St Leonards North Public School, with Jeremiah Crowley as the first Head Teacher. Crowley's term was so well-regarded that by the time of his retirement in 1900, the school was often referred to as "Crowley's School".

=== 1910: as Crows Nest Public School ===
In July 1910, owing to confusion over the "St Leonards" name as two other public schools in the area possessed it (St Leonards East and St Leonards Superior), the school was renamed Crows Nest Public School.

In 1912, a new two-storey building in the Federation Free style, which formed the main building of the school along the Pacific Highway, was opened. Further extensions to this building, designed by Government Architect Richard Wells, were completed in 1924 and officially opened by the Minister for Education, Albert Bruntnell. A Roll of Honour commemorating the service of students in the First World War was unveiled in February 1917.

=== 1936: as Crows Nest Central Junior Technical School ===
In January 1936, as part of an effort by the NSW Government to expand vocational education, the school was converted into Crows Nest Central Junior Technical School, which then provided secondary technical education.

=== 1959: as Crows Nest Boys High School ===
The school was renamed Crows Nest Boys High School in January 1959. An Army Cadet unit was formed in 1946: it was disbanded in 1975 due to the withdrawal of Commonwealth Government support for school-based cadet units. The unit re-formed in 1980, as a joint unit with North Sydney Boys High School, which lasted until disbanding in 1990.

=== 1992: closure ===
By the early 1990s, the school was targeted for closure by the Department of Education, as part of a plan to expand the size of North Sydney Girls High School. The boys' sister school, Cremorne Girls High School, and Milsons Point Public School were also closed around this time. Crows Nest Boys' staff and community attempted to retain the school as a TAFE NSW college, but in March 1992 the Minister for Education, Virginia Chadwick, announced it would close. It was decided to move North Sydney Girls from their campus across the Pacific Highway to the boys' school site (the old North Sydney Girls to become Bradfield College for vocational education). Crows Nest Boys closed in December 1992, with the decision to close noted by one teacher: "There was no political will to save our school ... it was seen as expendable. We’d done all this work, taken the consultation process seriously, and we lost the school anyway". The controversy continued after the closure when the last Headmaster, Don Weir, was refused several appointments and was only offered a lower position by the Department.

=== Legacy ===
The buildings of the former Crows Nest Boys High School are heritage items listed under the North Sydney Local Environment Plan 2013. In 2014, the Department of Education resolved to create a new public high school in the North Sydney area (on the site of Bradfield College, which would move to St Leonards). As the first new public school in the area since 1961, some former alumni of Crows Nest Boys campaigned to restore the "Crows Nest High" name, colours and motto to the new school. The Department, however, eventually decided on "Cammeraygal High School", which opened in January 2015.

== Headmasters ==
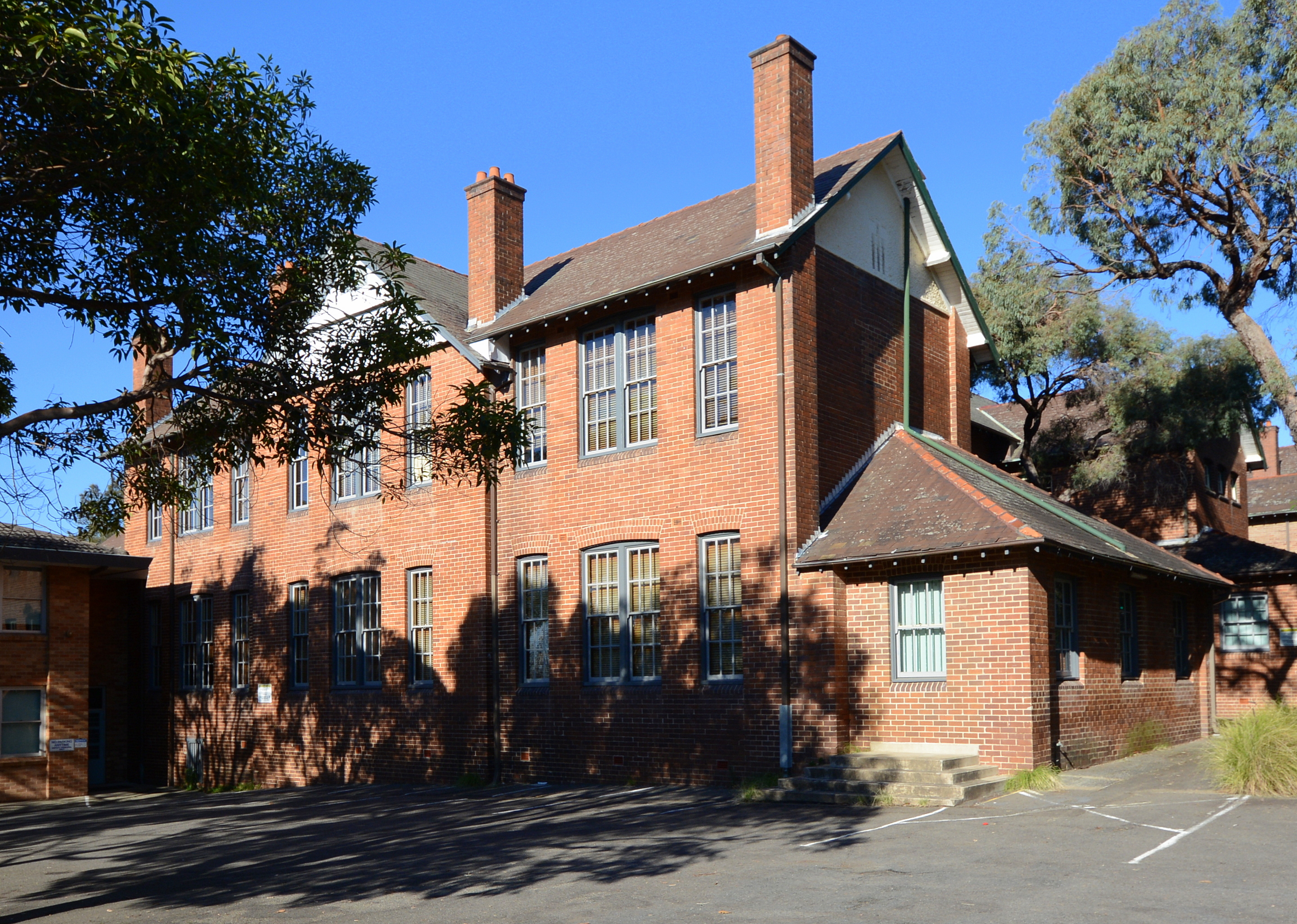
The original buildings of the former Crows Nest Boys High, 2015.

Years	SLNPS
1883–1900	Jeremiah Crowley (Head Teacher)
1900–1910	William Roberts (Head Teacher)
Years	CNPS
1910–1912	William Roberts (Head Teacher)
1912–1920	Theo Sheehy (Head Teacher)
1920–1921	Bede Keough (Head Teacher)
1921–1926	J. H. Hopman (Head Teacher)
1926–1927	Henry Hepburn
1927–1935	Arthur Knight
Years	CNCJTS
1936–1942	Frederick Charles Derham
1943–1946	William Arthur Morris
1947–1949	Arthur Herbert Cooper
1950–1958	Alexander G. Robertson
Years	CNBHS
1959–1963	Edward Thomas Wallace B.Sc. Dip.Ed.
1964–1970	Harold James Hamnett B.Sc. Dip.Ed.
Jan–Dec 1971	John Holme B.A. Dip.Ed.
1972–1974	William John Cooke B.A. Dip.Ed.
1975–1986	Leonard Harvey B.A.
1987–1992	Donald James Weir B.A.

== Notable alumni ==
- Peter Carson – rugby union player
- Mark Hartill – rugby union player
- Levon Khachigian – medical research scientist and Professor of Medicine at UNSW
- Jaimie Leonarder – musician and radio DJ
- Brian Norton – rugby league player. Coach of North Sydney
- Marty Rhone – singer and actor

== See also ==
- List of government schools in New South Wales
