= Mean Pair of Jeans =

"Denim and Lace"
- Germany 7" single cover

Single by Marty Rhone

from the album Denim and Lace
- Released: March 1977
- Recorded: 1976
- Studio: Alberts
- Genre: Pop
- Length: 3:29
- Label: EMI
- Songwriter(s): Aranda; Rhone
- Producer(s): Lister; Lyons

Marty Rhone singles chronology
"On the Loose" (1976)	"Denim and Lace" (1977)	"Things We Did Last Night" (1977)

"A Mean Pair of Jeans" is a song by Australian pop singer-songwriter Marty Rhone. It was released in Australia in March 1977 as the second single from his second studio album, Marty Rhone. The song peaked at number ten on the Australian Kent Music Report singles chart.

== Background ==
Marty Rhone's breakthrough single, "Denim and Lace" (July 1975), reached No. 8 on the Australian Kent Music Report singles chart. His next top 40 hit, "On the Loose", was released in December 1976. "A Mean Pair of Jeans", which followed in March of the next year, peaked at No. 10. Both "On the Loose" and "A Mean Pair of Jeans" appeared on his second studio album, Marty Rhone, in July 1977.

== Track listing ==
7" single (MS-209)

- Side A "A Mean Pair of Jeans" - 3:29
- Side B "I'm Gone Again" - 3:28

12" single (MSD-109)

- Side A "A Mean Pair of Jeans" - 6:00
- Side B "They Made It Rock" - 5:30

== Charts ==
=== Weekly charts ===
Chart (1977)	Peak position
Australia (Kent Music Report)	10

=== Year-end charts ===
Chart (1977)	Position
Australia (Kent Music Report)	44
