= Anna Donald =

Australian physician, medical researcher, academic and lecturer (1966 – 2009)

Anastasia Katherine Donald (née Courtice; 7 April 1966 – 1 February 2009), known as Anna Donald, was an Australian pioneer in the field of evidence-based medicine as well as an epidemiologist and company director.

== Early life and early education ==
Donald was the child of biologist Tony Courtice and Janet Donald (née Hales). Her maternal grandmother was reportedly of Chinese descent. When Donald was 2, her parents separated. Following her parents' separation, she and her mother lived with Donald's maternal grandparents for a year. Later, Donald's mother divorced Courtice and married lawyer Bruce Donald, with whom she would rear Anna, who took her surrogate father's surname (Donald). She undertook her secondary education at North Sydney Girls High School and Narrabundah College in Canberra.

During this time, she distinguished herself from her peers by winning state and national prizes in mathematics and French. Further, she represented Australia in the International Mathematical Olympiad. However, her education at North Sydney Girls was not without issue. In 1981, after Bruce Donald and Janet separated, Donald experienced emotional symptoms and developed anorexia nervosa. In Year 10, she attended school in France for several months. Depressed and disenchanted with her old school when she returned to Australia, she transferred to Narrabundah College in Canberra, where she completed Years 11 and 12.

== Tertiary education and training ==
After completing Year 12 at Narrabundah College, she gained entrance to the University of Sydney in 1985, where she resided in Wesley College, University of Sydney and the Women's College, University of Sydney and earned a Bachelor of Arts, majoring in History and Pre-Clinical Medical Studies, in 1989.

During her collegiate education, Donald won the Henry Lawson Prize for a collection of short stories. She also presided over the 1988 World Universities Debating Championship held in Sydney, at which she met her future husband, Michael Roland Hall, a member of the winning debating team from the University of Oxford. Donald was elected to the University Senate (1989), President of the University of Sydney Union (1987–88), and Honorary Treasurer of the University of Sydney Union (1986–87) during this time.

Donald later won the 1989 Rhodes Scholarship for New South Wales, becoming the second woman from the state to win the award. Donald's paternal grandfather was also a recipient of a Rhodes Scholarship in the 1930s. Donald attended the University of Oxford in as a member of New College, Oxford, where she read for a Bachelor of Medicine and Surgery (B.M.B.Ch.) degree. After her medical studies, Donald interned in Oxford and did residencies in other parts of Oxfordshire, Glasgow, and Kenya. Following her residencies, Donald attended Harvard University in Cambridge, Massachusetts, United States, during which time she was sponsored by a Menzies Scholarship, a Kennedy Fellowship, and a Caltex Award and where she earned a Master's in Public Policy (M.P.P.).

== Career ==
Donald worked as a doctor and lecturer in epidemiology and public policy at University College London, and on the Whitehall Study on public health.

Donald was a founding editor of the British Medical Journal's Clinical Evidence, the Journal of Evidence-Based Healthcare and Evidence Based Health Policy; and the author or co-author of The Hands-on Guide for Junior Doctors and House Officers Guide To Survival.

== Personal life ==
In 2003, while living in the United Kingdom, Donald was reunited with Michael Hall, who had become a lawyer. They married in 2005 in St. James Church, Sydney. On 27 February 2007, Donald was diagnosed with metastatic breast cancer. She and her husband returned to Sydney. In April 2008, she began writing a blog for the online version of the British Medical Journal. Called From the Other Side, it chronicled her living with cancer. Her last post was on 22 December 2008. Donald died on 1 February 2009, aged 42, at Mater Hospital in Crows Nest, a suburb on the lower North Shore of Sydney.

== Sources ==
- Correction by Smith and Gray above
- A summer party at Anna Donald's
- Anna Donald obituary
