= Cammeraygal High School =

Location
- 192 Pacific Highway, Crows Nest; New South Wales; Australia; 33°49′49″S 151°12′12″E

Information
- Type: Government-funded co-educational comprehensive secondary day school
- Motto: Empowered to Achieve
- Established: January 2015; 11 years ago
- Educational authority: New South Wales Department of Education
- Oversight: NSW Education Standards Authority
- Principal: Kathy Melky
- Teaching staff: 35.7 FTE (2018)
- Years: 7–12
- Enrolment: 505 (2018)
- Campus type: Junior and Senior
- Colours: Black and red
- Website: cammeraygal-h.schools.nsw.gov.au

Cammeraygal High School is a government-funded co-educational comprehensive secondary day school, located on the Pacific Highway, Crows Nest, a suburb on the lower north shore of Sydney, New South Wales, Australia.

Established in 2015, the school enrolled approximately 500 students in 2018, from Year 7 to Year 12, of whom less than one percent identified as Indigenous Australians and 42 percent were from a language background other than English. The school is operated by the NSW Department of Education in accordance with a curriculum developed by the New South Wales Education Standards Authority; the principal is Kathy Melky.

== History ==
The school is named in honour of the Cammeraygal, a clan of the Eora tribe of Indigenous Australians who inhabited the lower north shore of Sydney.

The school site originally opened in 1914 as North Sydney Girls High School until December 1993, when North Sydney Girls relocated across the Pacific Highway to the site of the closed Crows Nest Boys High School. The site was then taken over by Bradfield College. The former buildings of North Sydney Girls and Bradfield College are listed as a heritage item in the North Sydney Local Environment Plan 2013.

In 2014, when the Department of Education resolved to create a new public high school in the North Sydney area on the site of Bradfield College (which moved further up the Pacific Highway to St Leonards), the first new public school in the area since 1961, some former alumni of Crows Nest Boys High School campaigned to restore the "Crows Nest High" name, colours and motto to the new school. However the department eventually decided on "Cammeraygal High School", which opened in January 2015.

In 2018, plans were revealed for an expansion of the school by creating a senior campus at the former Crows Nest TAFE Campus site on West Street, Crows Nest.

In 2020, Cammeraygal High School had its first graduating class of Year 12.

== Campuses ==
Cammeraygal High School has two campuses.

Junior Campus – Years 7–9. This campus was formerly the North Sydney Girls High School campus prior to them moving to a new campus across the road, this campus was completed in 2015.

Senior Campus – Years 10–12. This Campus was formerly the West Street TAFE, this campus was completed in 2019.

In 2019 an art hall was built on the senior campus, the new hall features a basketball court, new change rooms and a stage for performances.

== Houses ==
Cammeraygal High School has four houses these houses are named after Australian Sports persons.

1. Freeman – Named after Former Olympian Cathy Freeman, the house colour is Yellow
2. Goodes – Named after Former AFL player Adam Goodes, the house colour is Blue.
3. Hughes – Named after Former Australian Cricketer Phillip Hughes, the house colour is Purple.
4. Stosur – Named after Australian tennis player Samantha Stosur, the house colour is Green.

These houses are primarily used for sporting events held by Cammeraygal High School such as swimming carnivals, athletics and cross country.

== Co-curriculum Sports ==
Cammeraygal High School students have the opportunity to participate in sports, all students from year 7-10 must complete in term sport, this is optional for year 11 and 12 students, along with in term sports, students has the opportunity to participate in extra curricular sports such as P&C sports and knock out competitions with other public schools in the Sydney Region.

== See also ==
- List of government schools in New South Wales: A–F
- Education in Australia
