= On the Loose (Marty Rhone song) =

Single by Marty Rhone

from the album Denim and Lace
- Released: December 1976
- Recorded: 1976
- Studio: Albert Studios
- Length: 2:33
- Label: EMI
- Songwriter(s): Bryan Dawe; Steve Groves

Marty Rhone singles chronology
"Take Away" (1976)	"On the Loose" (1976)	"Mean Pair of Jeans" (1977)

"On the Loose" is a song by Australian pop singer-songwriter Marty Rhone. It was released in Australia in December 1976 as the lead single from his second studio album, Marty Rhone. The song peaked at number 33 on The Australian chart.

== Track listing ==
7" single (MS-200)

- Side A "On the Loose" - 2:33
- Side B "You Can't Have Me" - 2:54

== Charts ==
Chart (1976/77)	Peak position
Australia (Kent Music Report)	33
