= James Wright Group =

- Also known as: The Big Apple, James Riot, James Wright Band
- Origin: Adelaide, South Australia, Australia
- Years active: 1967–1971, 1974–1975
- Label: Pepper
- Past members: Bobby Bishop, John Carlini, Bill O'Grady, Chubby Carlini, James Swann, Dave Taylor, John Swan, John Fraser, John Haffert

James Wright Group were an Australian rock, soul band from Adelaide, which grew in prominence in the latter half of the 1960s. They had two local top 10 hit singles, "Louise" (1970) and "Half a Minute" (1971). The band supported performances by Max Merritt, Billy Thorpe & the Aztecs, The Levi Smith Clefs, The Mixtures, and The Twilights. After two tours of the eastern coast the group disbanded in 1971. They reformed briefly in 1974 with John Swan as their drummer.

== Early years: The Big Apple to James Riot ==
The group initially formed as a trio, The Big Apple, in Adelaide in 1967, with Bobby Bishop on drums and vocals, John Carlini (died 2023) on bass guitar and vocals and Bill O'Grady on guitar and vocals. Their debut gig was at the Octagon Ballroom in Elizabeth and they soon secured a residency at Big Daddy's Discothèque in 1967. They played nightly, sharing the stage with interstate and local acts: The Valentines, The Twilights, James Taylor Move, The Blues Syndicate, and Chain Gang.

Later that year they added Jamie Swann on vocals and Chubby Carlini on saxophone and as a five-piece changed their name to James Riot. They played regularly at The Princeton Club (Burnside Town Hall), St Clair Youth Centre (Woodville), Salisbury Youth Centre (Salisbury) and The Octagon to huge crowds. By 1968 the band had a new singer, Dave Taylor, who joined after Swann left suddenly for family reasons. The name was changed to James Wright Group.

== Main years and singles success ==
As James Wright Group, for the next two years they played residencies at various Adelaide venues. They shared the billing with Max Merritt and The Meteors, Billy Thorpe & the Aztecs, The Levi Smith Clefs, The Mixtures, Y4 and The Twilights. During this time they also performed as backing band for solo artists including Johnny Farnham, Ronnie Burns, Jeff Phillips, Liv Maessen, Rim D. Paul, Mike Furber, and Johnny Young when they visited Adelaide.

Max Pepper of Pepper Records – a local studio of Milton Ingerson Productions in Adelaide – approached the group and subsequently recorded six tracks for release on his new record label. Pepper wanted to take advantage of the 1970 radio ban on imported records which was in place.

James Wright Group's debut single, "Louise" / "Good Times Together", was released in 1970. The first run sold out quickly, it entered the local charts and reached no. 2. Go-Set, the Australian teen pop music newspaper, published their Top 20 Australian Singles Chart and listed "Louise" at No. 15 for that year.

In 1970 they were the first rock group ever invited to play at Adelaide's Carols by Candlelight and they played "Louise" along with several Christmas carols, also backing Ronnie Burns and Liv Maessen for their performances. James Wright Group spearheaded the promotion for Adelaide's first Festival of Fashion, releasing a promotional single called "Festival Girl" and appearing on a cover of the special Liftout section on the Festival in The Advertiser.

In 1970, Radio 5AD Programme Manager, Trevor Cowling, picked "Louise" as one of the three noteworthy Australian singles of the year. He visited American record producers offering the singles for an American release. RCA expressed a desire to release "Louise" internationally and requested the master tapes however Pepper Records refused to release them.

In early 1971, while "Louise" was still in the charts, the group released their second single, "Half a minute" / "Never Had a Girl". It entered the charts (for a while The James Wright Group had two singles in the Adelaide radio charts at the same time), peaked at No. 7 and then succumbed to the flood of imported international records after the import ban had ended.

James Wright Group were regulars on TV programmes, often playing live-to-air, including Move – hosted by Vince Lovegrove (ex-Valentines) – NWS9's four-hour Rock Marathon aired on Saturday afternoons; ZAP! – SAS10's Saturday morning rock show with Ron Kosmider. They made guest appearances on Adelaide Tonight (NWS9's weekly variety show hosted by Ernie Sigley) and The Go Show (ATV0'S national rock music show hosted by Ross D. Wyllie).

After two eastern states tours, Pepper Records decided not to release the third single "Lawdy Lawdy" and closed their doors. The James Wright Group disbanded in late 1971.

== Reformation as The James Wright Band ==
John and Chubby Carlini reconvened with O'Grady as The James Wright Band in 1974 to capitalise on their local profiles, adding John Fraser on guitar and John Swan on drums. Through Swan they became friends with his brother Jimmy Barnes and the early version of pub rockers, Cold Chisel. Upon hearing Cold Chisel live at The Lord Melbourne Hotel, O'Grady recommended them to his friend Lovegrove who then became their manager.

The James Wright Band played at The Festival Theatre (Little River Band's first appearance), supported Osibisa at Apollo Stadium, opened for Bad Company at Memorial Drive, appearing at the Countdown Nightclub (Hindley Street, Adelaide), Woodville Town Hall (headlining with the fledgling Cold Chisel as a support act), the Arkaba, the Largs Pier, and other Adelaide pubs.

Swan was replaced by John Haffert on drums late in 1974 and the band toured to Canberra (supporting Maria Muldaur), Sydney, Brisbane (residency at The George Hotel) and The Gold Coast (performing at The Playroom in Tallebudgera). While in Sydney they met Bernie Cannon, who produced GTK (a national 10-minute daily rock segment on ABC Television before The News), recording six tracks to be aired on the programme. Their videos were among the last episodes of the show. The James Wright Band disbanded in late 1975.

== Discography ==
- "Louise" / "Good Times Together" – Pepper Records (1970)
- "Half a Minute" / "Never Had a Girl" – Pepper Records (1971)
