= John St Peeters =

- Born: Johnny Lo Piccolo; 3 October 1956 (age 70); Melbourne, Victoria, Australia
- Genres: Pop; disco
- Occupations: Musician; TV presenter; songwriter
- Instruments: Vocals; accordion; piano; guitar
- Years active: 1969–present
- Labels: W&G; Astor; EMI; RCA

- Member of: John St Peeters and the Sharells

John St Peeters (born Johnny Lo Piccolo, 3 October 1956) is an Australian musician, TV presenter and songwriter. His top 40 hits on the Kent Music Report Singles Chart are "Deep Inside of Me" (July 1978) and "So Many Ways" (April 1979). St Peeters provided the lead vocals on "Wonder World!" the theme for a children's TV variety series, Simon Townsend's Wonder World, from 1979. He was the host of The John St Peeters Show on TV's Channel 0/28 from March to May 1984. In 2001 Jo Skott published his biography, The Squeeze Box Kid: The John St. Peeters Story.

== Biography ==
John St Peeters was born in Melbourne, in 1956, to Italian-born parents, Pasqualino Lo Piccolo – a greengrocer – and Giovanna (née Basile). He grew up in Richmond with a younger sister, Josephine "Jo". Early in his career he performed as Johnny Lo Piccolo. From the age of 11 he played piano accordion on TV talent quests, such as Brian and the Juniors, New Faces, variety shows, including In Melbourne Tonight, and at clubs in Melbourne. He released singles on the W&G label, "Johnny LoPiccolo's Dance Party" (November 1970), "Johnny's Choice" (May 1972), and "Crazy Polka" (1972). He spent almost three years in Canada performing and recording: he was referred to as "the Squeeze Box Kid".

John St Peeters and the Sharells were formed in 1974, as a vocal trio, with two female vocalists, Niki Nicholls and Kim Julin. They performed "You've Lost That Lovin' Feeling" on the Ernie Sigley Show in May 1975. They toured Australia, North America and South-East Asia before issuing a single, "Take Me if You Want Me", in October on the Astor label. He resumed his solo career in 1976 with a disco-based single, "You Know that You're Sexy", in November of that year, which reached the top 60 on the Kent Music Report singles chart.

Peeters signed with EMI Records, which issued his next three singles, "Shiny Side Up" (June 1977), "Fadin' Away" (October) and "Love the Way You Move" (December): none reached the top 100. At the King of Pop Awards of 1977 St Peeters won Most Popular New Talent. In the following year his contract was taken up by RCA Records. He released his next single, "Deep Inside of Me", co-written by Peeters and Aldo Lennard, which peaked at No. 22. Lennard was also his talent manager. According to Australian musicologist, Ian McFarlane, "By that stage, [the singer] had established himself as Australia's version of David Essex, with his good looks and sophisticated pop releases." His next single, "High Class Woman" (November 1978), reached the top 50.

He followed with his debut album, So Many Ways (1978), produced by Spencer Lee. In 1979 he formed the John St Peeters Band and toured the Australia club circuit. Its title track was issued as a single in April, which peaked at No. 13, and was also co-written by Peeters and Lennard. His second album, One Night Stand, and its associated singles did not reach the top 40. He appeared on teen pop music TV show, Countdown, from 1976, he co-hosted an episode in June 1978. He later reflected "The biggest thrill of all, though, was making it on the biggest television music show that existed during those years — Countdown, hosted by Molly Meldrum. What a fantastic experience that was." He premiered his single, "Wonder World", on the show in March 1980; it is the theme song for Simon Townsend's Wonder World, a children's variety TV series. He was also the guest host on another pop music show, Sounds.

In January 1981 St Peeters was touted as the host of a pilot episode of a pop music series for the Willard King Organisation. He told Clay Adams of The Australian Women's Weekly, "I should hear shortly whether or not it will go ahead and if I'll be in the hot seat. Personally I hope the show does receive the okay as Australian television needs another pop music show at the moment." From March to May 1984 and from February to April 1985 he was the host of The John St Peeters Show on TV's Channel 0/28. The Canberra Times' Debbie Muir detailed that "As compere, he will be the focus of the program, introducing guests, performing and having the chance to air his classical piano training." From the mid-1980s he focussed on his TV and club performances.

In 2001, his sister, Jo Skott published his biography, The Squeeze Box Kid: The John St. Peeters Story. In 2013 he worked with fellow local artists, Ray Burgess, Tommy Emmanuel, Marty Rhone and John "Swanee" Swan to release a single, "Legends of the Southern Land". In April 2015 he supported the Alannah and Madeline Foundation charity at the Crown Palladium, by performing in front of Sophia Loren, including "Legends of the Southern Land" (with the group). As of May 2015 St Peeters is married to Teresa Vee and lives in Melbourne with their two children.

== Discography ==
=== Studio albums ===
List of albums, with Australian chart positions
Title	Album details	Peak chart positions
Title	Album details	AUS
So Many Ways	Released: 1979; Label: RCA (VPL10210)	57
One Night Stand	Released: 1980; Label: RCA (VPL10293	-
I Got You Babe (by John St Peeters and Jane Scali)	Released: 1986; Label: Hammard (HAM 133)	-

=== Singles ===
List of singles, with selected chart positions, showing year released and album name
Title	Year	Peak chart positions	Album
Title	Year	AUS KMR	Album
"Johnny LoPiccolo's Dance Party" (by Johnny Lo Piccolo)	1970	—	non-album singles
"Johnny's Choice" (by Johnny Lo Piccolo)	1972	—	non-album singles
"Crazy Polka" (by Johnny Lo Piccolo)	1972	—	non-album singles
"Take Me if You Want Me" (by John St Peeters and the Sharells)	1975	—	non-album singles
"You Know that You're Sexy"	1976	53	non-album singles
"Shiny Side Up"	1977	—	non-album singles
"Fadin' Away"	1977	—	non-album singles
"Love the Way You Move"	1977	—	non-album singles
"Deep Inside of Me"	1978	22	So Many Ways
"High Class Woman"	1978	49	So Many Ways
"So Many Ways"	1979	13	So Many Ways
"You You're the One"	1979	81	One Night Stand
"Wonder World"	1980	78	One Night Stand
"Love Is all You Need"	1980	—	One Night Stand
"Dangerous Hearts"	1981	—	non-album singles
"Street Kids"	1983	—	non-album singles
"I Need that Someone to Love" (by John St Peeters and Jane Scali)	1985	—	I Got You Babe
"Don't Make Love to Strangers"	1986	—	non-album singles
"Legends of the Southern Land" (with Swanee, Marty Rhone and Ray Burgess featuring Tommy Emmanuel)	2013	—	non-album singles
"—" denotes a recording that did not chart or was not released in that territory.

== Awards and nominations ==
=== King of Pop Awards ===
The King of Pop Awards were voted by the readers of TV Week. The King of Pop award started in 1967 and ran through to 1978.

Year	Nominee / work	Award	Result
1977	himself	Most Popular New Talent	Won
