= Swanee (singer) =

British-born Australian rock singer

John Swan
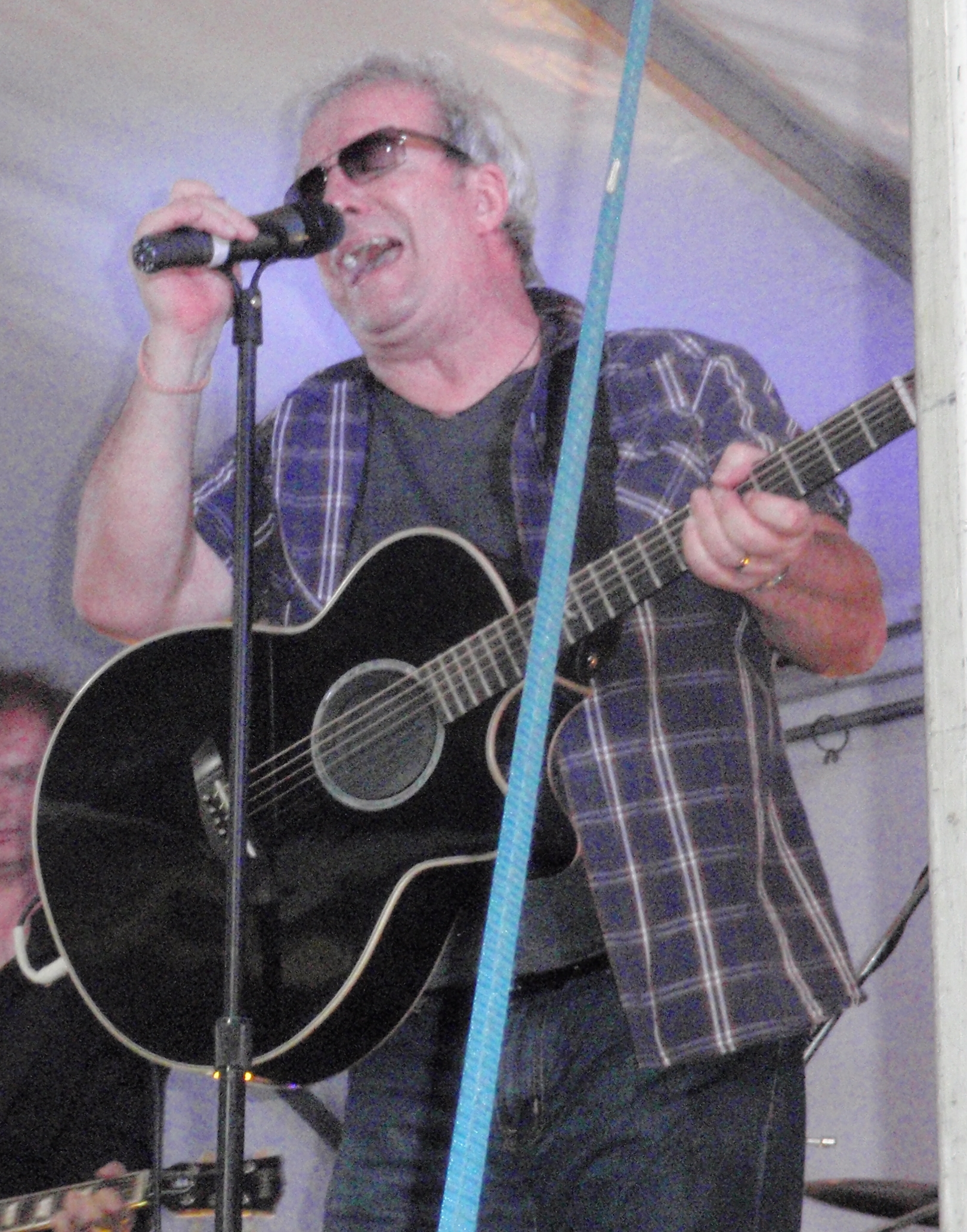
- Swanee in 2011

Background information
- Also known as: Swanee
- Born: John Archibald Swan; Glasgow, Scotland, United Kingdom
- Genres: Rock, hard rock
- Instruments: Vocals, guitar, drums
- Years active: 1966–present

John Archibald Swan OAM, better known as Swanee, is an Australian rock singer. He is the older brother of singer-songwriter Jimmy Barnes.

== Early life ==
John Archibald Swan migrated to Australia as a child with his family in 1961. His father, James Swan, was a violent alcoholic. When his mother remarried in the mid-1960s, he was the only child to keep his biological father's surname. After being the target of sexual abuse by the son of a family friend, he left home aged 13.

== Career ==
=== Early bands ===
Swan joined his first professional band, Happiness, as a drummer when he was 14. When he was 17, he enlisted in the Australian Army, and was discharged after two years of service. In early 1974 he was the drummer with The James Wright Band, moving on to Jim Keays' Southern Cross for a short time.

In 1975 he joined Adelaide band Fraternity replacing Bon Scott on vocals for two years. In 1977, Swan became the vocalist with Feather. This band had been known as Blackfeather in the early 1970s, but by 1977 no original members were left so the name was shortened. Feather recorded one single with Swan, "Girl Trouble", before he left in 1978 to establish himself as a solo artist.

=== 1979–1986: Early solo career ===
Under the name Swanee by which he was already known, Swan released his debut solo single "Crazy Dreams" in 1979. An album, Into the Night, and several other singles followed but met with little commercial success.

In late 1981, his version of "If I Were a Carpenter" became a national hit, peaking at number 5. The single was followed by the 1982 studio album This Time It's Different which spawned another two hits, "Temporary Heartache" and "Lady What's Your Name", with the latter peaking at number 13 and was the 66th biggest-selling single in Australia in 1982.

In 1986 Swanee featured in an advertising campaign for West End Draught, a South Australian beer. The brewer provided financial support to Swanee's tours and he in turn appeared in the company's TV commercials.

=== 1987–1989: The Party Boys ===
In 1987, Swanee replaced Angry Anderson as the lead singer of The Party Boys, a touring band with floating membership, formed in 1983 by Paul Christie of Mondo Rock. Swan's tenure with the band was the group's most successful period. A cover of the John Kongos song "He's Gonna Step On You Again" peaked at number 1 on the Australian charts. The band's self-titled album made the Australian top 20. Swan remained with the band until 1989 before going solo again.

=== 1990–present: Later solo career ===
Since 1990, Swan's recording career has been less than prolific, producing only two singles that year, including a cover of Little Richard's "Lucille" for The Delinquents.

In 1997, Swan released Heart and Soul produced by Danny Bryan.

In 2007 Swan released the album Have a Little Faith (Liberation Records). The project was recorded with producer /guitarist Mark Moffatt. The album was recorded with Nashville musicians. The album is a reflection of his past troubles and his love for the Blues.

In 2013 he worked with fellow Australian artists Ray Burgess, Tommy Emmanuel, John St Peeters and Marty Rhone, to release the single "Legends of the Southern Land".

In July 2014 Swanee released the album One Day at a Time, consisting of entirely original work, in collaboration with Darren Mullan from the Adelaide Recording Studio and Tony Minniecon.

In June 2021, Melodic Rock Records released a 20-track compilation titled Greatest Hits.

In May 2025, Swanee announced the forthcoming release of new album Believe, containing 16 tracks, all but one are duets with his family and friends.

== Recognition and honours ==
In 2015, Swan was announced as South Australia's Senior Australian of the Year.

In 2017 he received an Order of Australia Medal (OAM), "For service to music as a performer, and to the community through charitable organisations".

== Discography ==
=== Studio albums ===
List of studio albums, with selected details and chart positions
Title	Album details	Peak chart positions
Title	Album details	AUS
Into the Night	Released: October 1980; Format: LP; Label: WEA (600076)	66
This Time It's Different	Released: June 1982; Format: LP, cassette; Label: WEA (600121)	22
Bushido	Released: April 1985; Format: LP, cassette; Label: Starcall (SFL1 0126)	73
Heart And Soul	Released: 1997; Format: CD; Label: EastWest (0630188252)	—
Have a Little Faith (As John Swan)	Released: 2007; Format: CD, DD; Label: Liberation Music (LIBCD9236 2)	—
One Day at a Time	Released: 2014; Format: CD, DD; Label: Swanee (SWAN001)	—
Believe	Released: 1 August 2025; Format: CD, 2×LP; Label: Songland	37

=== Live albums ===
List of live albums, with selected details and chart positions
Title	Album details	Peak chart positions
Title	Album details	AUS
Ready for Action! Live in the Snow	Released: October 1983; Format: LP, cassette; Label: WEA (250241.1)	31
Live with the HSCC	Released: 2018; Format: CD; Label: Swanee	—

=== Compilation albums ===
List of compilation albums, with selected details and chart positions
Title	Album details	Peak chart positions
Title	Album details	AUS
Days Gone By – The Best of Swanee	Released: October 1984; Format: LP, cassette; Label: WEA (251477-1)	52
Greatest Hits	Released: 3 June 2021; Format: CD, digital; Label: Melodic Rock (MRR137)	—

=== Singles ===
List of singles, with selected chart positions
Year	Title	Peak chart positions	Album
Year	Title	AUS	Album
Credited as Swanee
1979	"Crazy Dreams"	68	Non-album singles
1979	"Samantha"	—	Non-album singles
1980	"Ol' Rosie"	—	Into the Night
1980	"Linda"	—	Into the Night
1981	"Mathew"	—	Into the Night
1981	"If I Were a Carpenter"	5	This Time It's Different
1981	"Samantha" (re release)	93	Non-album single
1982	"Temporary Heartache"	18	This Time It's Different
1982	"Lady What's Your Name"	13	This Time It's Different
1983	"Sail Away"	52	Non-album single
1983	"Motor Down"	—	Ready for Action! Live in the Snow
1984	"I'm Ready" / "Carrie-Ann"	22	Non-album single
1985	"You Ought to Know by Now"	—	Bushido
1985	"Turn Away"	—	Bushido
Credited as John Swan
1985	"Say You'll Do Something"	—	Non-album singles
1985	"It Could Have Been You"	—	Non-album singles
1986	"(I'm in Love with An) Angel"	—	Non-album singles
1986	"West End Girls"	—	Non-album singles
Credited as Swanee
1990	"Lucille"	—	The Delinquents (soundtrack)
1990	"Blood Is Thicker Than Water"	—	Non-album single
Credited as John Swan
2013	"Legends of the Southern Land" (with John St Peeters, Marty Rhone and Ray Burgess featuring Tommy Emmanuel)	—	Non-album single
Credited as Swanee
2018	"Lady, What's Your Name" (live)	—	Live with the HSCC
2018	"Temporary Heartache" (live)	—	Live with the HSCC
2025	"Should've Never Let You Go" (with Melinda Schneider)	—	Believe
2025	"Brother of Mine" (featuring Jimmy Barnes and Alan Barnes)	—	Believe
2026	"Lately" (with Ian Moss)	—	Believe (Deluxe)

==== Other singles ====
List of singles as featured artist, with selected chart positions
Year	Title	Peak chart positions
Year	Title	AUS
1985	"The Garden" (as Australia Too)	22

== See also ==
- Fraternity (band)
- The Party Boys
