= Patyegarang =

Patyegarang (c 1780s) was an Australian Aboriginal woman, thought to be from the Cammeraygal clan of the Dharug nation. Patyegarang (pronounced Pa-te-ga-rang) taught William Dawes the language of her people and is thought to be one of the first people to have taught an Aboriginal language to the early colonists in New South Wales.

== Contact with the colonists ==
Patyegarang was aged around 15 when she became a guide and language teacher to William Dawes. Dawes, an astronomer, mathematician and linguist, was a lieutenant in the Royal Marines on board HMS Sirius, of the First Fleet, to the Colony of New South Wales. William Dawes met Patye (as he would call her) when he struck up friendships with the local Gadigal people.

=== Documenting language ===
William Dawes was the first person to write down an Australian language. Patyegarang tutored Dawes in his understanding and assisted in the documentation of the Dharug language spoken by the Gadigal people and other tribes, sometimes referred to as the Sydney language. Patyegarang was one of the first people to have taught an Aboriginal language to a non-Aboriginal person. Together they made the first detailed study of Australian Indigenous languages, compiling vocabularies, grammatical forms, and many expressions in the language during his three-year stay in the colony.

Three notebooks compiled by William Dawes survive. The language notebooks were discovered by Phyllis Mander-Jones, an Australian librarian, while she was working at the University of London's School of Oriental and African Studies (SOAS).

The notebooks include specific terms for the sun, the moon and the clouds leading Indigenous Curator James Wilson Miller to note that Patyegarang had detailed knowledge of the land and sky.

=== Relationship with William Dawes ===
Patyegarang may have lived with William Dawes in his hut at Observatory Point. Some of the expressions she shared with Dawes, such as Putuwá which means "to warm one's hand by the fire and then to squeeze gently the fingers of another person" indicate a close relationship. Australian writer Thomas Keneally describes Patyegarang as the "chief language teacher, servant, and perhaps lover" of William Dawes.

Patyegarang learned to speak and read English from Dawes. It is not clear how long she was associated with him or what eventually happened to her.

== Proposal for statue of Patyegarang ==
In 2020 a motion was put to the Council of the City of Sydney proposing that the council's CEO "work with local Aboriginal groups, including a representative from the Metropolitan Local Aboriginal Land Council (MLALC), to identify potential options to commission a public artwork commemorating Patyegarang". However, this has been without the consultation of Patyegarang's descendants or Dharug Elders and Community members as Metro Local Aboriginal Land Council does not speak for the Dharug Community.

== In popular culture ==
In 2014, the Bangarra Dance Theatre created a work choreographed by Stephen Page called Patyegarang depicting her life and relationship with Dawes.

I believe Patyegarang was a young woman of fierce and endearing audacity, and a 'chosen one', so to speak, within her clan and community. Her tremendous display of trust in Dawes resulted in a gift of cultural knowledge back to her people almost 200 years later and I feel her presence around us, with us, as we create this new work.

— Stephen Page, 2014

Writer Kate Grenville based the characters in her novel The Lieutenant on the historical friendship of Patyegarang, the young Gadigal woman, and Lieutenant William Dawes.

== Patji-Dawes Award ==
The Patji-Dawes Award, named after Patyegarang and Dawes, recognises "outstanding achievements in language teaching by an accomplished practitioner in Australia, whether teaching in primary or secondary school, university, language schools or centres". The award was originally an outreach activity of the ARC Centre of Excellence for the Dynamics of Language in collaboration with the Australian Federation of Modern Language Teachers Associations (AFMLTA). The AFMLTA now administers the award which is presented at its annual international conference.

== See also ==
- William Dawes (British Marines officer)
- Dharug language
- List of Indigenous Australian historical figures
