= Electricity Power House =

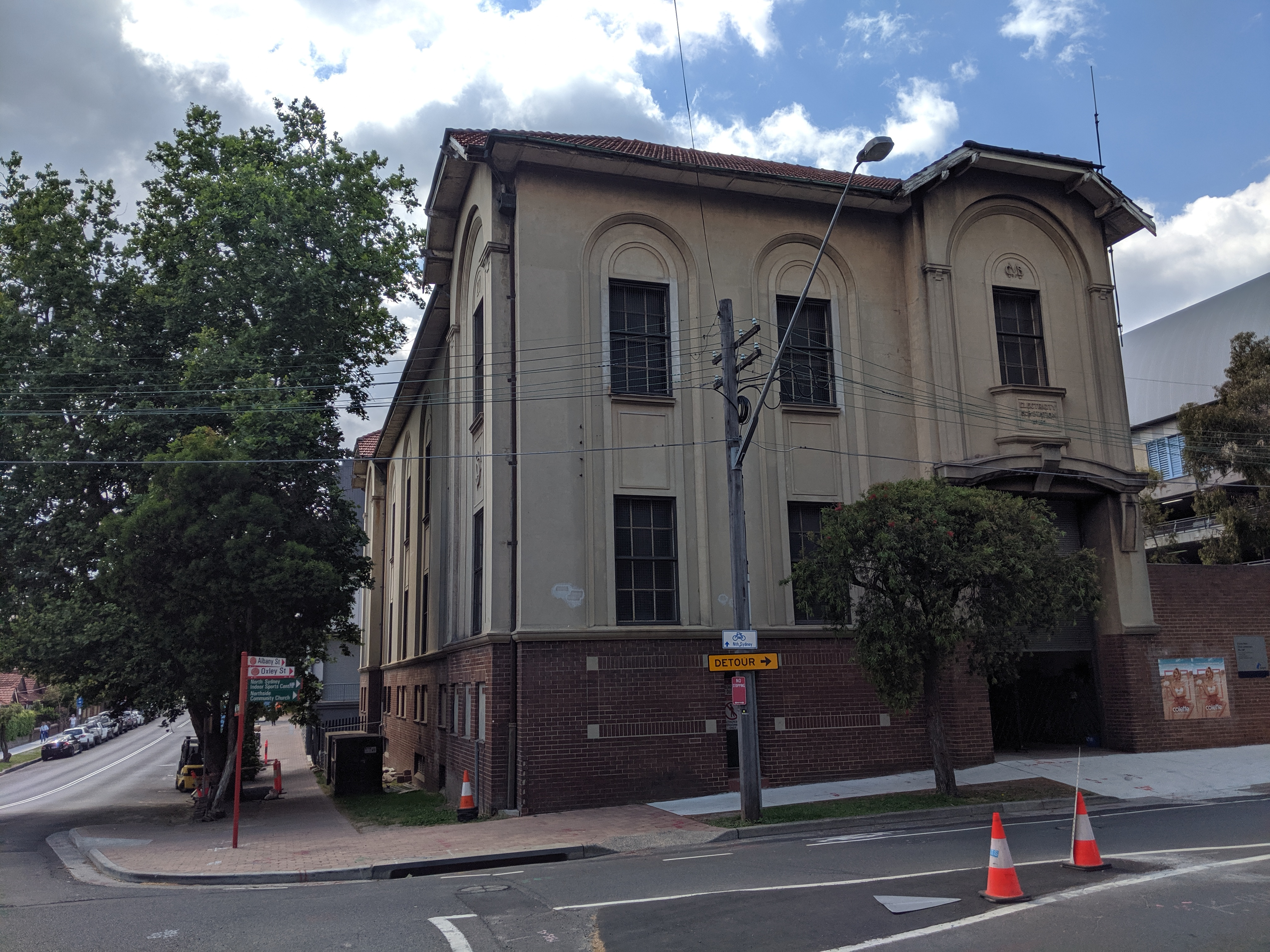
- Electricity Power House, 23 Albany Street, Crows Nest, New South Wales

- Location within Sydney Location within Australia
- 33°49′27″S 151°11′58″E
- Location: 23 Albany Street, Crows Nest, North Sydney Council, New South Wales, Australia

History
- Built: 1927–

Site notes
- Architectural style: Interwar Georgian Revival
- Owner: Ausgrid

New South Wales Heritage Register
- Official name: Electricity Power House; #187 'CROWS NEST'
- Type: State heritage (built)
- Designated: 2 April 1999
- Reference no.: 931
- Type: Electricity Transformer/Substation
- Category: Utilities - Electricity

The Electricity Power House is a heritage-listed electrical substation located at 23 Albany Street, Crows Nest, New South Wales, a suburb of Sydney, Australia. It was built in 1927 . It is also known as Electricity Sub-Station No. 187. The property is owned by Ausgrid, an agency of the Government of New South Wales. It was added to the New South Wales State Heritage Register on 2 April 1999.

== History ==
The Crows Nest substation is a purpose built structure dating from 1927. An MCS logo appears on the facade in relief.

== Description ==
The Crows Nest substation is a large dominating three storey building of unusual wide-eaved hipped roof which features mansard roof sections to the corners. It has a brick base course and rendered upper two storeys with recessed central bay which features arch sections with multi paned windows located within. The Crows Nest substation is constructed in load bearing face brick at the lower level and cement render at the upper facade levels. The roof has exposed timber rafters and ceramic tiles.

The substation is complete in the Interwar Georgian Revival style. Exterior materials include face bricks, cement render, ceramic tiled roof, and timber joinery.

== Heritage listing ==
The Crows Nest substation is a rare and representative example of an unusual building design from the interwar period which features mansard roof corners to the main roof, decorative rendered walls with recessed bays and elongated arches to the facades. It is considered to be of state significance.

Electricity Power House was listed on the New South Wales State Heritage Register on 2 April 1999.

== See also ==
- Ausgrid
- Australian non-residential architectural styles
