= Ray Burgess =

Australian entertainer

- Born: Raymond Peter Burgess; 1951 (age 74–75); Melbourne, Victoria, Australia
- Genres: Pop
- Occupations: Singer, TV presenter
- Instruments: Vocals
- Years active: 1970–present
- Label: Festival/Infinity
- Formerly of: Red Time
- Website: rayburgess.com.au

Raymond Peter Burgess (born 1951) is an Australian pop singer and TV presenter. His highest charting single, "Touch Me" (late 1974) reached the top 20 on the Kent Music Report singles chart. From July 1976 to November 1977 he hosted TV pop music and magazine-style show, Flashez on ABC-TV. He issued three solo albums, Not So Pretty (1976), Final Mix (1978) and Gloria—Best of Ray Burgess (1992), all via Festival/Infinity. His daughter, Casey Burgess, is also a singer and TV personality and former member of children's music group, Hi-5 from 2008 to 2013.

== Biography ==
Raymond Peter Burgess was born in Melbourne in 1951. From 1970 to 1973 Burgess was a singer for Red Time, a pop music covers band, which performed the club circuit in Melbourne and Perth.

Burgess' first solo single, "Touch Me", was released in late 1974 via Festival Records/Infinity Records. It peaked at No. 16 on the Kent Music Report singles chart. This was followed by "Love Fever" (July 1975), which reached No. 21. He promoted his singles by appearances on TV pop music show, Countdown. He became a TV presenter for Melbourne-based programme, Rock 'n' Roll Circus in late 1975. The artist relocated to Sydney to host the pop music and magazine-style, Flashez, for ABC-TV from July 1976.

Burgess issued his debut solo album, Not So Pretty, in 1976, which was produced by Ross Wilson for Festival Records/Infinity Records. It provided the single, "Sad Rock'n'Roll" (September 1976), which was written by Greg Macainsh, and reached the top 100. After Flashez was cancelled in November 1977, Burgess formed a backing band to play the club circuit. His final charting single, "Gloria" (July 1977), reached the top 50. He followed with two more albums, Final Mix (1978) and Gloria—Best of Ray Burgess (1992). His daughter, Casey Burgess, is also a singer and TV personality and former member of children's music group, Hi-5 from 2008 to 2013. In 2013 he worked with fellow Australian artists Tommy Emmanuel, John St Peeters, John "Swanee" Swan, and Marty Rhone, to release the single "Legends of the Southern Land".

== Discography ==
=== Albums ===
- Not So Pretty (1976) – Festival/Infinity (L-35952)
- Final Mix (1978) – Festival/Infinity
- Gloria—Best of Ray Burgess (compilation album, 1992)

=== Singles ===
- "Touch Me" (1974) – Festival/Infinity/L&Y (K-5788) Aus: No. 16
- "Love Fever" (1975) – Festival/Infinity/L&Y (K-5969) Aus: No. 21.
- "Rock 'n' Roll Lightning" (1975) – Festival/Infinity/L&Y
- "Sad Rock And Roll" (1976) – Festival/Infinity/L&Y (K-6541)
- "Legends of the Southern Land" (with Swanee, John St Peeters and Marty Rhone featuring Tommy Emmanuel) (2013)
