= Marty Rhone =

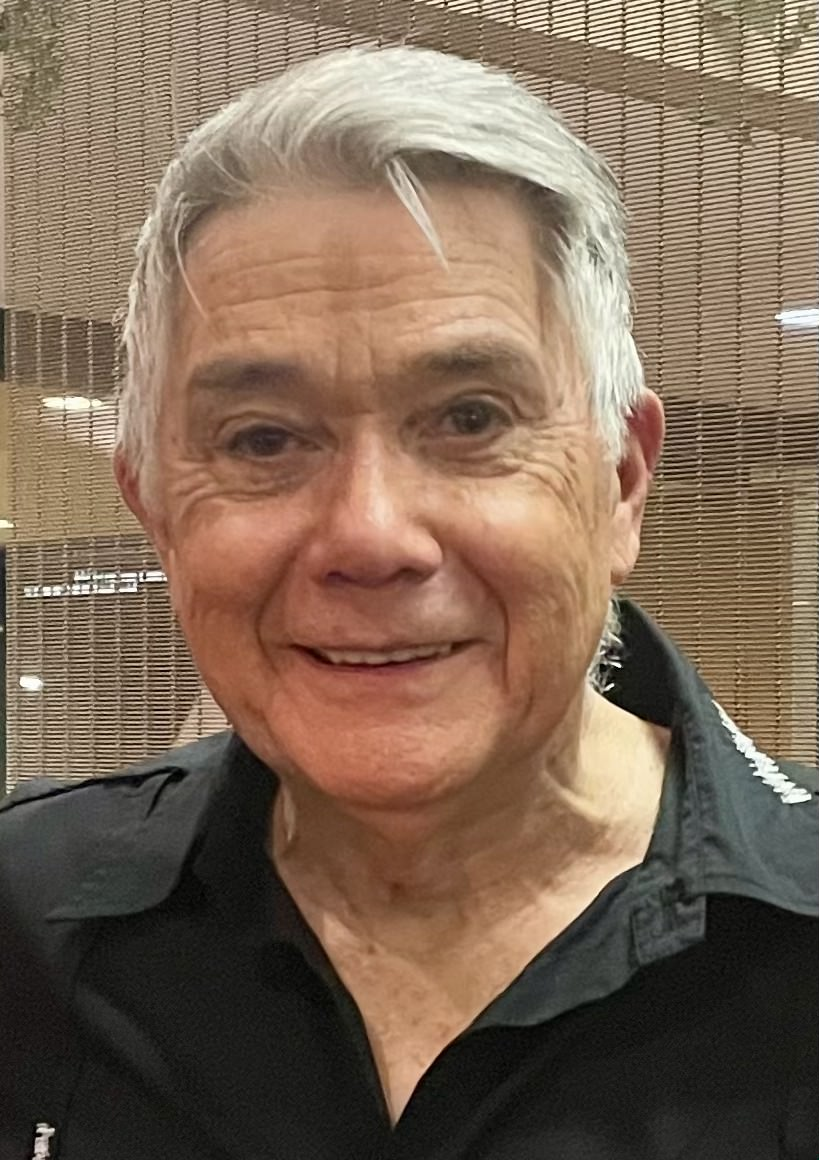
- Rhone in 2023

Background information
- Born: Karel Lawrence van Rhoon; 7 May 1948 (age 78); Soerabaja, East Java, Dutch East Indies
- Origin: Sydney, New South Wales, Australia
- Genre: Pop
- Occupations: Singer-songwriter; actor; manager
- Instrument: Vocals
- Years active: 1965–present
- Labels: Spin, Spiral, M7, Festival
- Website: martyrhone.com.au

Marty Rhone (born Karel Lawrence van Rhoon, 7 May 1948) is an Australian pop singer-songwriter, actor and talent manager. In July 1975 his single, "Denim and Lace", peaked at No. 8 on the Australian Kent Music Report Singles Chart. He had another hit in June 1977 with "Mean Pair of Jeans", which reached No. 10. As an actor, he appeared on the Australian stage in Godspell (1972–73); on TV in Number 96 (1974) and Class of '75 (1975); and in the London theatre production of The King and I (1979–80) alongside Yul Brynner.

From late 1987 to August 1990, he was the business manager of a trio of brothers, the Australian boxing champions: Dean (heavyweight class), Guy (light heavyweight) and Troy Waters (junior middleweight).

== 1948–1960: Early life ==
Marty Rhone was born as Karel (or Karl) Lawrence van Rhoon on 7 May 1948 in Soerabaja, Dutch East Indies (later named Surabaya, Indonesia). His father was Eddy Emile van Rhoon (born Soerakarta, Central Java, 1 July 1917), a clerk and former flying navigator in the Dutch East Indies navy during World War II. His mother was Judith Olive (née Bagshaw, born Sydney, 1 January 1929). She was a singer and actress, who met Eddy through the Sydney jazz scene; he was a visiting pianist while on leave. The couple married in 1947 and Judith accompanied Eddy to Soerabaja. The family migrated to Australia on 21 April 1950 and briefly lived in Sydney and Brisbane, and then moved to Darwin. Eddy worked as a Communications Officer for the Department of Civil Aviation; he was stationed in Darwin from March 1951 until July 1957. The family remained in Darwin until mid-1960, by which time Rhone had a younger sister, Kymn Dale (born 1958) and brother, Martin Richard (born 1960).

Rhone was taught piano by his father but he preferred singing. In August 1959, aged 11, he first performed publicly at Darwin's Mitchell Street Town Hall in Around the World in 80 Minutes – a charity variety concert – alongside his father on piano and his mother. After he finished primary school, the family moved to Sydney, where he attended Crows Nest Boys High School.

== Career ==
=== 1961–1969: Early career ===
In mid-1961, Rhone appeared on a talent quest segment of ATN7-TV series, Tarax Show, and was offered a singing spot on a children's show, Kaper Kabaret. In late 1965 he formed a band, The Blue Feelings, and they auditioned for an appearance on Saturday Date, a teen music show. After the audition Spin Records owner, Nat Kipner, signed Rhone to a recording contract and the label issued his debut single, "Nature Boy", in February the following year. For his next two singles, "Thirteen Women" (April) and "I Want You Back Again", Rhone was backed by Spin Records label mates, The Soul Agents, a beat pop group. They had formed in 1964 and by 1966 consisted of Jerry Darmic on bass guitar, Roger Felice-Andrews on drums, John Green on guitar and Barry Kelly on organ.

Rhone's fourth single, "She Is Mine", included the self-penned B-side, "Village Tapestry", which appeared in September. None of these singles charted on the Go-Set National Top 40, however Australian musicologist, Ian McFarlane, described "Village Tapestry" as being "highly regarded among 1960s aficionados". In Iain McIntyre's book, Tomorrow Is Today: Australia in the Psychedelic Era, 1966–1970 (2006), the track was listed by Ian D. Marks as one of the 'Top 7 Proto-Psychedelic Australian Tracks from 1966'. Marks described it as "completely out of left field. With a gentle, almost medieval lilt, autoharps a-strumming and a charming spoken word verse—there was nothing like this released in Australia at the time. Melodic, evocative and delicate". During 1966 Marty Rhone and The Soul Agents supported The Rolling Stones on the United Kingdom rock group's tour of Australia. They also performed on the bill of the P.J. Proby Show at the Sydney Stadium with Wayne Fontana, Eden Kane and The Bee Gees appearing. Rhone moved to Melbourne and issued five more singles on Spin Records but had "limited success".

=== 1970–1977: Pop peak ===
In March 1970, Rhone was conscripted for National Service until 1972. During his service he attended the Royal Military College, Duntroon, as a member of their band, for 18 months.

From April 1972 to July 1973 he acted in the Australian stage version of Godspell at The Richbrooke, Sydney with Rod Dunbar, Peita Toppano and John Waters. The Australian cast soundtrack album was issued as Godspell: a Musical Based on the Gospel According to St. Matthew on His Master's Voice. In April 1973 he took over from Brendon Lunney as a presenter on the TV show Switched On Set. He attended the Sydney Conservatorium of Music and in July 1973 he released a new single, "Goodbye in May".

He composed the music for Ruzzante Returns from the Wars, which starred Ivar Kants and ran at the Parade Theatre, Kensington from May to June 1974 as a one-act play. It is based on the text of Angelo Beolco's Il Parlamento de Ruzante, originally written in Italy during the mid-16th century. As a double bill at the same venue, Rhone performed the music he had composed for La Mandragola, a satirical play by another 16th-century Italian, Niccolò Machiavelli. It had roles by Reg Gillam, Pamela Stephenson and Ingrid Mason. Rhone followed with appearances on TV soap operas, Number 96 (1974) and Class of '75 (1975).

By mid-1975 Rhone had signed with M7 Records and issued his next single, "Denim and Lace", which peaked at No. 8 on the Australian Kent Music Report Singles Chart. It was promoted on the Class of '75 soundtrack album. It was co-written by L Lister (aka Jack Aranda) and F Lyons (aka Shad Lyons). Lister and Lyons also produced Rhone's debut album, Denim and Lace, recording at Alberts Studio 139. At the end of the year "Denim and Lace" was the second highest selling single in Australia. His next single, "Star Song", reached the Top 50, the next two were less successful, while the last one for the year, "On the Loose" reached the Top 40. Of the four singles, "On the Loose (Again)" – co-written by Bryan Dawe and Steve Groves (ex-Tin Tin) – was used by Rhone to win the 1976 Australian Popular Song Festival and represented Australia at the World Popular Song Festival. In June 1977 he had another hit with "Mean Pair of Jeans", which reached No. 10. In July that year he issued his second album, Marty Rhone.

=== 1978–1986: London and Sydney ===
In July 1978 Rhone relocated to London. In June 1979, Rhone took the role of Lun Tha in the London Palladium presentation of The King and I alongside Yul Brynner and Virginia McKenna. By September 1981 he had returned to Sydney.

=== 1987–2006: Business manager ===
In 1987 Rhone became a business manager for a trio of brothers, the Australian boxers: Dean, Guy and Troy Waters. In May 1988 Festival Records issued a ten-volume album series, Festival File, including Village Tapestry: The Festival File Volume 9 by Marty Rhone and The Soul Agents. Stuart Coupe reviewed the collection for The Canberra Times, "Never a big pop star, Marty Rhone will be remembered for a number of outstanding singles, a number of which were very advanced in style and production".

In December 1988 Rhone organised the "Battle on the Beach" for January 1989 with Dean Waters, as Australian heavyweight champion, to fight New Zealand's title holder; and Guy, who had been stripped of his Australian light heavyweight title, due to fight another New Zealand champion. Meanwhile, Troy was waiting for an opportunity at the world IBF junior middleweight title in February. From October 1988 to March 1993 Rhone promoted at least 16 boxing events. However, by August 1990 the Waters brothers had walked out, he complained "I've made a three-year investment in three fighters and they want to leave when two are on the brink of world titles ... I will demand substantial compensation in court and a seven-figure sum is a possibility".

=== 2007–present: Infrequent performances ===
Commencing in 2007, Rhone has performed a repertoire of tracks by Cliff Richard; a gig at the Crown Casino, Melbourne, in late 2008 was filmed and broadcast in February the next year as Marty Rhone: A Tribute to Cliff Richard and The Shadows.

From April to July 2009, he continued the Richard tributes with The Dream Tour, which had Dean Bourne as US singer Roy Orbison; An album titled Born to Rock was released digitally in May 2010.

In May 2011 on the Cliff & Dusty presentation he performed with Sheena Crouch as UK pop singer Dusty Springfield; and in June 2012 with his own "musical theatre fantasy" covering Richard's and The Beatles' material in Cliff Joins The Beatles.

In 2013, he worked with fellow local artists, Ray Burgess, Tommy Emmanuel, John St Peeters and John "Swanee" Swan to release a single, "Legends of the Southern Land".

In August 2016, Rhone released 50th Anniversary Album, a career spanning compilation album.

In March 2017, Rhone released a new single titled "Graceland on the Line", commemorating 40 years since the death of Elvis Presley.

Rhone voices Tarman in Hideo Kojima's 2025 video game Death Stranding 2: On the Beach.

== Personal life ==
In January 1976, Marty Rhone married Rosa Merola; the couple have two sons.

== Discography ==
=== Studio albums ===
List of studio albums
Title	Album details	Peak chart positions
Title	Album details	AUS KMR
Denim and Lace	Released: May 1976; Label: M7 Records (MLF 127); Formats: LP	98
Marty Rhone	Released: July 1977; Label: M7 Records (MLF 171); Formats: LP	94
First Love	Released: 1998; Label: Massive (7321532); Formats: CD; Note: album of love songs	
Born to Rock	Released: 13 May 2010; Label: The Can; Formats: Music download	
The Long and Winding Road	Released: 11 May 2012; Label: Marty Rhone; Formats: Music download; Note: Tribute to the Beatles	
Jealous of the Sky	Released: 7 November 2019; Label: Marty Rhone; Formats: Music download, streaming; Note: Country music album	

=== Compilation albums ===
List of compilation albums.
Title	Album details
Village Tapestry: The Festival File Volume 9	Released: May 1988; Label: Festival Records (L-19009); Formats: LP; Note: greatest hits album
50th Anniversary Album	Released: 1 August 2016; Label: Marty Rhone; Formats: Music download, streaming, CD; Note: greatest hits album

=== Extended plays ===
List of EPs
Title	Album details
5 Great Hits From Godspell (credited to Marty Rhone and the Stars of Godspell)	Released: 1973; Label: EMI Music (PRS-2325); Formats: LP

=== Singles ===
List of singles, with selected chart positions, showing year released and album name
Title	Year	Peak chart positions	Album
Title	Year	AUS KMR	Album
"Nature Boy"	1966	—	non-album singles
"Thirteen Women" (credited as Marty Rhone and His Soul Agents)	1966	—	non-album singles
"I Want You Back Again" (credited as Marty Rhone and His Soul Agents)	1966	—	non-album singles
"She Is Mine" / "Village Tapestry"	1966	72	non-album singles
"Tell Me Love" / "No No No No"	1967	60	non-album singles
"Green Mansions" / "Lonely Too Long"	1967	—	non-album singles
"She's Coming Home" / "Hurry, Poor Working Man"	1968	99	non-album singles
"Ruby with the Red Hair" / "Appeal"	1969	73	non-album singles
"So You Want to Be a Pop Singer?" / "As the Sun Goes Down"	1970	—	non-album singles
"Don't Look Back" / "The Day the Letter Came"	1972	—	non-album singles
"Goodbye in May"	1973	—	non-album singles
"Denim and Lace"	1975	8	Denim and Lace
"Star Song"	1976	44	Denim and Lace
"Take Away"	1976	99	Denim and Lace
"On the Loose"	1976	33	Marty Rhone
"Mean Pair of Jeans"	1977	10	Marty Rhone
"Things We Did Last Night"	1977	—	Marty Rhone
"Legends of the Southern Land" (with Swanee, John St Peeters and Ray Burgess featuring Tommy Emmanuel)	2013	—	non-album single
"Graceland on the Line"	2018	—	Jealous of the Sky
"We Had a Good Thing Goin'"	2019	—	Jealous of the Sky
"Jealous of the Sky"	2019	—	Jealous of the Sky
"Devil Woman"	2020	—	non-album single
"Legends of the USA"	2020	—	Jealous of the Sky
"Crazy for You"	2020	—	Jealous of the Sky
"Country Roads / On the Road Again"	2021	—	non-album single
"Village Tapestry"	2022	—	non-album single
"The Best Love Song"	2023	—	Jealous of the Sky
"Back in '69"	2025	—	Jealous of the Sky
"—" denotes a recording did not chart in Australia.

== Awards and nominations ==
=== Go-Set Pop Poll ===
The Go-Set Pop Poll was coordinated by teen-oriented pop music newspaper, Go-Set and was established in February 1966 and conducted an annual poll during 1966 to 1972 of its readers to determine the most popular personalities.

Year	Nominee / work	Award	Result	Ref.
1967	himself	Australian Acts: Male Singer	7th	
1968	himself	Australian Acts: Male Singer	6th	

=== Mo Awards ===
The Australian Entertainment Mo Awards (commonly known informally as the Mo Awards), were annual Australian entertainment industry awards. They recognise achievements in live entertainment in Australia from 1975 to 2016. Rhone won one award in that time.

Year	Nominee / work	Award	Result (wins only)
2010	himself	John Campbell Fellowship Award	Won

=== Helpmann Awards ===
The Helpmann Awards are accolades for live entertainment and performing arts in Australia, presented since 2001. Rhone has been nominated for one award.

Year	Nominee / work	Award	Result
2014	himself as the Kralahome in The King and I	Best Male Actor in a Supporting Role in a Musical	Nominated

== Notes ==
1. For name as Karel Lawrence van Rhoon and birth date as 7 May 1948 see National Archives of Australia, Australian Netherlands Migration Agreement, item No. A997, 1949/1668, and item with barcode 950972. For birthplace as Surabaya, former Netherlands East Indies see Summers. For name as Karl Lawrence Van-Rhoon see Australasian Performing Right Association. Other sources give first name as Carl.
