= William Dawes (British Marines officer) =

British marine and colonial administrator

William Nicolas Dawes (1762–1836) was an officer of the British Marines, an astronomer, engineer, botanist, surveyor, explorer, abolitionist, and colonial administrator. He traveled to New South Wales with the First Fleet on board HMS Sirius.

== Early life ==
William Dawes was born at Portsmouth, Hampshire, in early 1762, the eldest child of Benjamin and Elizabeth (Sinnatt) Dawes. He was christened there on 17 March 1762. His father was a clerk of works in the Ordnance Office at Portsmouth.

He joined the marines as a Second Lieutenant on 2 September 1779. He was wounded in action against the French Navy under the Comte de Grasse at the Battle of the Chesapeake in 1781.

Dawes volunteered for service with the New South Wales Marine Corps, which accompanied the First Fleet. Because he was known as a competent astronomer, he was asked to establish an observatory and make astronomical observations on the voyage and in New South Wales.

== New South Wales ==
From March 1788 Dawes was employed in the settlement as an engineer and surveyor, and built the first Sydney Observatory on what is now Dawes Point, under the southern approach to Sydney Harbour Bridge. In his several roles, Dawes made astronomical observations, constructed batteries on the points at the entrance to Sydney Cove, laid out the government farm and first streets and allotments in Sydney and Parramatta. Dawes took part in several explorations to the mountains west of Sydney, beyond the Nepean River and the Cowpastures; the first attempt to cross the Blue Mountains. Dawes' skill in computing distances and map making were invaluable in the new colony.

Dawes was also interested in studying the local Eora people. He developed a close relationship with a fifteen-year-old native girl, Patyegarang (Grey Kangaroo). She stayed in his hut acting as his language teacher, servant, and perhaps lover. During his time in Australia he became an authority on Aboriginal language. Patyegarang is known to have praised his linguistic abilities, referring to him as "Mr. Dawes budyiri karaga" ("Mr. Dawes pronounces well" or "Mr. Dawes good mouth").

He contemplated settling permanently in Australia. He intended to farm part-time, but wanted to have the security of an official position within the colony, as well. In Oct. 1791 he was offered a position in the colony as an engineer. Arthur Phillip made it clear that he would be awarded the position only if he apologized for two incidents that had offended Phillip. The first involved Dawes purchasing flour from a convict during a food shortage. Phillip stipulated that this was illegal, claiming the flour to be part of the man's rations and, therefore, ineligible for trade. Dawes argued that the flour was the man's personal property, not rations, and that he had the right to sell it. The second supposed offence occurred in Dec 1790, after British game-keeper John MacIntyre, believed by the notable Aboriginal Bennelong as well as others to be hunting not only game, but also Aboriginals, died at the hands of an Aboriginal named Pemulwuy, who sought retribution. The British authorities considered the attack unprovoked and planned to carry out a punitive expedition against the Aborigines. Dawes felt that the game-keeper was to blame for the attack and refused to take part in the expedition, disobeying direct orders from Gov. Phillip. He was finally persuaded to take part by the chaplain, Rev. Johnson. Afterwards, he stated publicly that he regretted being "persuaded to comply with the order". Phillip was incensed by what he viewed as a further act of insubordination. Dawes refused to retract his statement or to apologize for either incident, and was shipped off in December 1791 on HMS Gorgon with the first group of Royal Marines to return to England. At the time he told Astronomer Royal Nevil Maskelyne that he harbored hopes of one day returning to Australia and serving under different leadership. He applied at some point to return to the colony as a settler, but nothing came of recommendations that he be appointed as superintendent of schools or as an engineer.

Dawes Point in Sydney is named after him. There was once an island known as Dawes Island, in Sydney Harbour; when it was joined to an adjacent smaller island, the resulting larger island became known as Spectacle Island, after its shape.

== Governor of Sierra Leone ==
Dawes was given a letter of introduction by Rev. Johnson to William Wilberforce, whose acquaintance he made in early 1792. Wilberforce was impressed with Dawes, remarking that he was "an avowed friend of religion and order." Likely due to the influence of Wilberforce, Dawes was accepted into the Evangelical Clapham Sect. Just a few months later, in August 1792, he was then chosen to join John Clarkson in Sierra Leone, a colony founded as a home for Black Loyalists, African Americans who had been promised their freedom if the served for the Britain in the American War of Independence. Clarkson was serving as governor there.

Dawes' first term as governor wasn't without problems. He upset many colonists when he insisted, on orders from England, that the colonists abandon the lots they currently occupied and move to new lots allocated to them by Dawes. This was only one of several of Clarkson's actions that he was forced to countermand.

According to an account by one colonist, Anna Maria Falconbridge, Dawes became frustrated by the colonists' refusal to follow his orders and declared that he would return to England. The colonists responded by shouting "Go! Go! Go!". The colonists blamed him for the decisions made by his employers. One of the Methodist ministers, Henry Beverhout, referred to Dawes as "Pharaoh", invoking the story of Moses to encourage the people of Sierra Leone to resist his governance. At one point the colonists actually staged a false raid in an effort to obtain guns that Dawes believed they intended to use against members of the colonial government.

Dawes was motivated by the desire to help the people of Sierra Leone, but his religious zeal, his opposition to the local Methodist ministers, and what they considered his overbearing nature alienated him from many of the colonists and even from other colonial officials such as Thomas Clarkson.

His health suffering from both stress and the intolerable climate, he returned to England in March 1794. Within a few months of returning he wed Judith Rutter at Portsea, Hampshire, on 29 May 1794. They had three children, a daughter and two sons, before Judith's death.

In spite of his earlier difficulties with the colonists, Dawes was sent back to serve a second term as governor of Sierra Leone in January 1795, remaining until March 1796. In January 1799, he obtained a position as an instructor of mathematics at Christ's Hospital school, a position he retained until November 1800. Whilst serving in this position, he gave evidence before a committee of the House of Lords in June 1799, who were then considering a bill to regulate the slave trade.

In the early months of 1801, Dawes returned to serve his third and final term as governor of Sierra Leone, remaining there until February 1803. During his final term he was offered and rejected the governorship of the Seychelles.

== Later years ==
Finally returning to England in 1804, he settled in South Lambeth in London, but later moved to Bledlow in Buckinghamshire, where he trained missionaries for the Church Missionary Society (1804–1808).

His wife, Judith, had died ca. 1800. William remarried on 25 May 1811, at St. Pancras Old Church, London, to Grace Gilbert. She would prove to be a devoted helpmate in his future work.

William was encouraged by the great parliamentarian and abolitionist, William Wilberforce, to continue his work against the slave trade in Antigua. The work would be arduous and unpaid, but he agreed to undertake it, and in 1813 he traveled to Antigua with his wife and daughter Judith. In spite of his frequently poor health, his endeavors met with great success. His main duties involved founding and operating schools for the children of slaves. He also worked as a correspondent for the Church Missionary Society's official paper.

Unfortunately, he had little to show materially for his years of dedicated service to the state and the cause of abolition. By December 1826, his financial situation had become so precarious that he petitioned the Secretary of State for the colonies. His claim was supported by his former comrade Watkin Tench, now a lieutenant-general, but the petition was ultimately unsuccessful.

William Dawes died in Antigua in 1836. Dawes was described as “...outstanding in ability and character.” Gillen states that “...he was never given proper recognition, nor given financial compensation equal to the value of his work”.

== Children ==
William Dawes and Judith Rutter had four children.

Judith Dawes, born 22 June 1795, baptised at St Mary Magdalene, Woolwich, on 4 September 1795 and named for her mother. She married in Antigua and is known to have had at least two sons.

William Rutter Dawes, born 17 December 1797, baptised 11 February 1798, St Mary, Portsea. He was buried at Portsea, 26 May 1798.

William Rutter Dawes, was born on 19 March 1799 at Christ's Hospital then in the City of London (it moved to Horsham, West Sussex in 1902). Trained as a clergyman, he became an astronomer of note. He was said to have done all he could to bring comfort to his father and stepmother's declining years.

John Macaulay Dawes, baptised 29 June, 1800, City of London, named in honor of William's friend Zachary Macaulay, died in infancy.

== Cultural references ==
Dawes is the basis for Daniel Rooke, the central figure in Kate Grenville's 2008 novel The Lieutenant. The book is fictional but heavily based upon Dawes' notebooks. Jane Rogers' 1995 novel Promised Lands also focuses in part on the life of Dawes.

The translation of Yininmadyemi - Thou didst let fall (the title given to a piece of public art in Sydney's Hyde Park) is from Dawes' notebooks.
