= Denim and Lace =

Single by Marty Rhone

from the album Denim and Lace
- Released: July 1975
- Recorded: 1975
- Studio: Alberts
- Genre: Pop
- Length: 5:19
- Label: M7/EMI
- Songwriters: Laurence Lister; Francis Lyons
- Producers: Laurence Lister; Francis Lyons

Marty Rhone singles chronology
"Goodbye in May" (1973)	"Denim and Lace" (1975)	"Star Song" (1976)

"Denim and Lace" is a song by Australian pop singer Marty Rhone. It was released in July 1975 as the lead single from his debut studio album, of the same name. It is co-written by Laurence Lister and Francis Lyons, who also produced it for EMI Music. "Denim and Lace" peaked at number eight on the Australian Kent Music Report singles chart.

== Background ==
Marty Rhone, an Australian-based pop singer, signed with M7 Records a sub-label of EMI Music in mid-1975. Rhone had spent the previous year or two as an actor – both in music theatre and TV dramas. "Denim and Lace" was used to re-launch his singing career. It was co-written by Laurence "Roy" Lister and Francis "Shad" Lyons. Lister was an A&R agent for Leeds Music while Lyons was a country music artist. Both also produced the single.

== Reception ==
Cash Box magazine said "Marty Rhone sets an aggressive vocal against a choppy strut beat, sounding a bit like the Everly Brothers at times and Neil Sedaka at other points. A very simple story, equally simple catchy melody line, clean production and a good, high echoing hook combine for almost assured AM airplay."

== Track listing ==
7" single (MS-115)

- Side A "Denim and Lace" (Laurence Lister, Francis Lyons) - 5:19
- Side B "Take Me" - 3:36

== Charts ==
Chart (1975)	Peak position
Australia (Kent Music Report)	8

=== Year-end charts ===
Chart (1975)	Position
Australia (Kent Music Report)	45
