= Bradfield College (Sydney) =

Bradfield Senior College

Location
- 213 Pacific Highway, St Leonards, New South Wales; Australia; 33°49′6.23″S 151°11′13″E

Information
- Other name: The School for Creative Industries
- Type: Government-funded co-educational specialist senior secondary and vocational day school
- Established: 1993; 33 years ago
- Educational authority: New South Wales Department of Education; TAFE NSW
- Oversight: NSW Education Standards Authority
- Specialist: Creative industries
- College Director: Meredith Melville-Jones
- Years: 11–12
- Enrolment: 295 (2018)
- Campus type: Suburban
- Affiliations: Bradfield College (of TAFE); TAFE NSW Northern Sydney
- Website: bradfield.nsw.edu.au

Bradfield Senior College (sometimes called Bradfield College) is a government-funded co-educational specialist senior secondary and vocational day school specialising in the creative industries, located on the Pacific Highway, St Leonards, New South Wales, in the lower north shore suburb of Sydney, New South Wales, Australia.

Established in 1993, the college enrolled approximately 300 students in 2018, in Year 11 and Year 12 only, of whom one percent were Indigenous Australians. The school is operated by TAFE NSW in conjunction with the NSW Department of Education in accordance with a curriculum developed by the New South Wales Education Standards Authority. The principal is Meredith Melville-Jones, who also is the College Director of Bradfield College.

The related Bradfield College is one of seven colleges comprising TAFE NSW Northern Sydney.

== History ==
Bradfield Senior College began in 1993 on the site previously occupied by North Sydney Girls' High School. The college was the first of its kind in New South Wales to have TAFE NSW Certificate programs integrated with the NSW Higher School Certificate in areas such as Design, Music, Dance, Entertainment, Hospitality, Information Technology, Digital Media, Retail and Tourism Services. The school caters for students in Years 11 and 12 only and boasts an independent adult environment for its students, some of whom have come from challenging backgrounds. The majority of students are aged 16 to 22 years old.

== Campus ==
The Bradfield Senior College campus is located at 213 Pacific Highway on the St Leonards Learning and Innovation campus.

The school's facilities include a dance studio, music rehearsal rooms, recording studio, drama performance space, radio and editing rooms, darkroom, photography studio, visual art rooms, art exhibition studio, study centre, computer rooms (MAC and PC), food lab, biology lab, student lounge and design rooms.

== Curriculum ==
HSC General	HSC Vocational	TVET, External Dance and IT
Ancient History	Accommodation Services, Certificate II Hospitality Operations	Business Services Certificate II
Biology	Commercial Cookery, Certificate II Hospitality Operations	Dance Practices II
Business Studies	Design, Certificate III Design Fundamentals	Design Foundation Studies
Ceramics	Entertainment, Certificate II Live Production Theatre & Events	Entertainment, Certificate II Live Production Theatre & Events
Community & Family Studies	Furniture Making, Certificate II	Entertainment, Certificate III Live Production Theatre & Events
Dance	Information Technology, Certificate III Software Applications	Furniture Making Certificate II
Design & Technology	Theatre Film & Radio, Certificate II Media & Performance	Hospitality (Operations) Accommodation Services Strand Certificate II
Digital Imaging	Music Industry, Certificate II Foundation	Information Technology Certificate II
Drama	Retail Operations, Certificate II in Retail Operations	Information Technology Specialisation Studies Certificate III
English Advanced	Tourism, Certificate II in Tourism Operations	Jewellery Statement of Attainment
English Extension 1 and 2	Outdoor Recreation, (Partial) Certificate II in Outdoor Recreation	Music Industry (Foundation) Certificate II
English Fundamentals		Outdoor Recreation, (Partial) Certificate II in Outdoor Recreation
English Standard		Photography – Fundamental Skills
Food Technology		Retail Operations Certificate II
Legal Studies		Theatre Film & Radio, Certificate II Media & Performance
Geography		Tourism (Operations) Certificate II
History Extension		
Information Processes & Technology		
Industrial Technology (Multimedia)		
General Mathematics		
Mathematics		
Mathematics Extension 1		
Modern History		
Music		
Personal Development, Health & Physical Education		
Photography		
Society and Culture		
Software Design & Development		
Sport Lifestyle and Recreation		
Visual Arts		
Visual Design		
Work Studies		

Note: The TVET, External Dance and IT courses run one afternoon a week and are open to students who attend other schools if the school does not offer a particular subject.

== Notable alumni ==
- Rose Byrne – Australian actress
- Alex Karbouris – Australian internationally renowned DJ/producer
- Darren McMullen – Scottish-Australian VJ; works with MTV Australia
- Shimon Moore – Australian rock singer, guitarist, songwriter, and actor.

== See also ==
- List of government schools in New South Wales (A-B)
- Education in Australia
- TAFE NSW
