= North Sydney Girls High School =

North Sydney Girls' High School
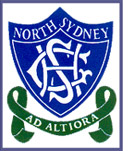

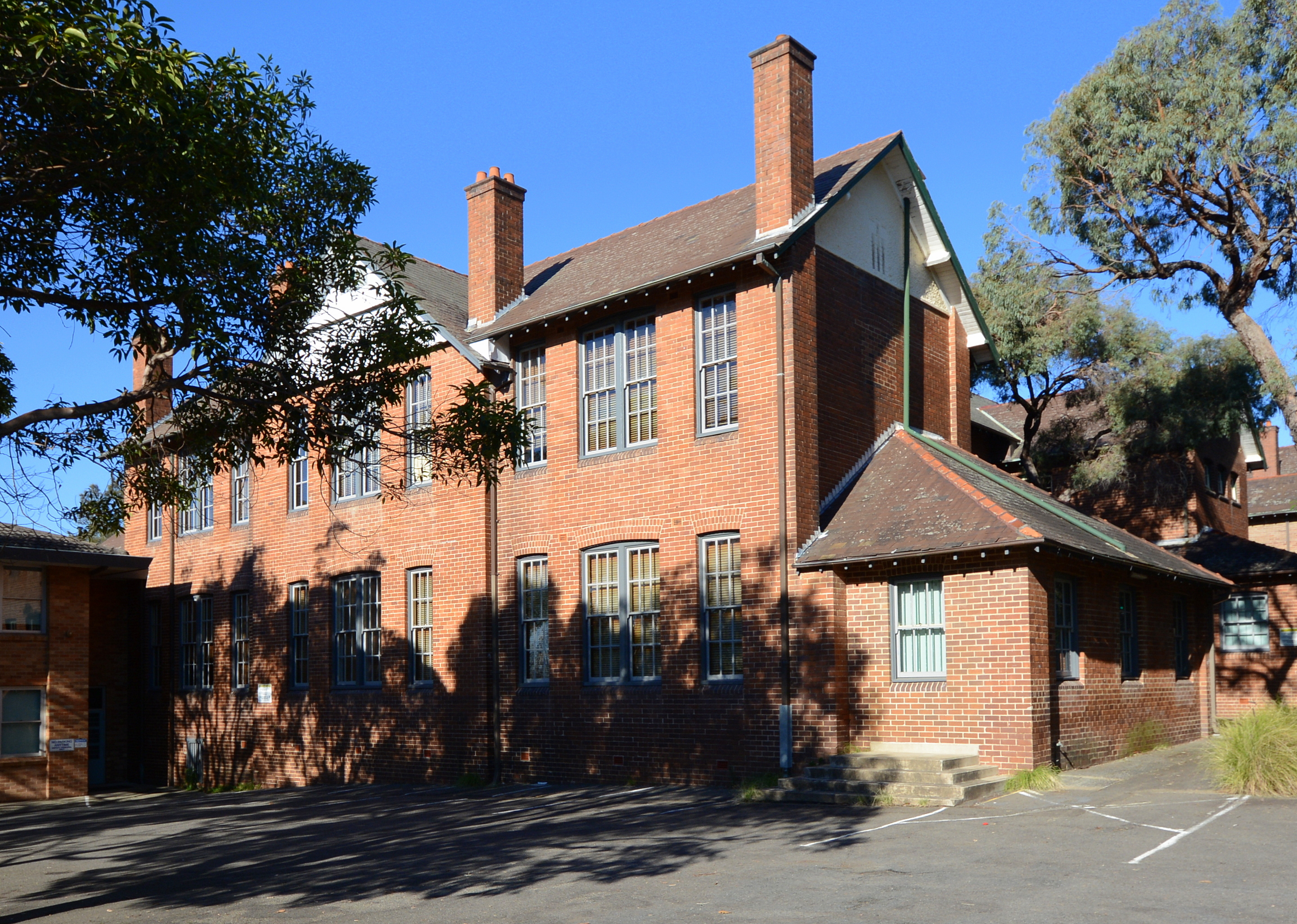
- A building at the school

Location
- Crows Nest, Sydney, New South Wales; Australia; 33°49′49″S 151°12′12″E

Information
- Type: Government-funded single-sex academically selective secondary day school
- Motto: Latin: Ad Altiora (Towards Higher Things)
- Established: 1914; 112 years ago
- Oversight: New South Wales Department of Education
- Principal: Megan Connors
- Teaching staff: 63 (2025)
- Years: 7–12
- Gender: Girls
- Enrolment: c. 923 (2025)
- Campus: Suburban
- Colours: Navy blue, green and white
- Website: northsydgi-h.schools.nsw.gov.au

North Sydney Girls' High School (abbreviated as NSGHS, more commonly known as NSG) is a government-funded single-sex academically selective secondary day school for girls, located in Crows Nest, in Sydney, New South Wales, Australia. Established in 1914, the school caters for approximately 910 students from Year 7 to Year 12. Admission to the school is based entirely on academic results through the Selective High School Placement Test undertaken by students in Year 6. In 2025, North Sydney Girls was ranked fourth among all high schools in Sydney.

== History ==
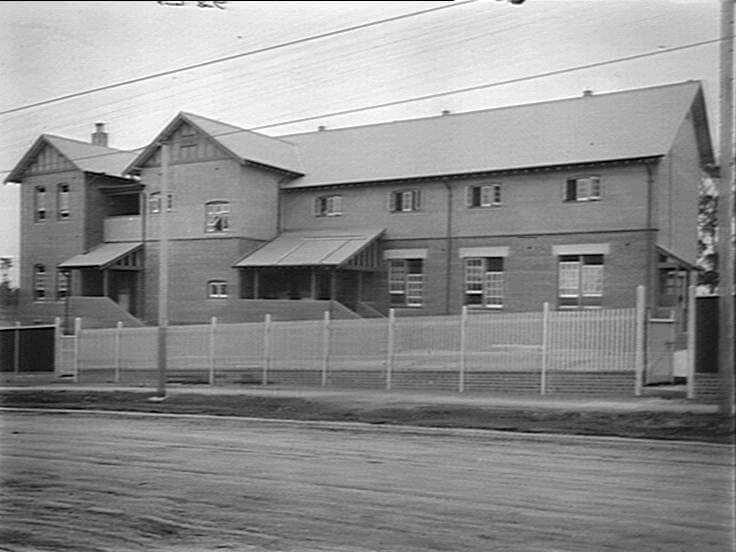
North Sydney Girls' High School prior to opening, January 1914

North Sydney Girls' High School was officially founded in 1914 with an enrolment of 194 students. The school was originally located on the corner of Hazelbank Road and the Pacific Highway, where Cammeraygal High School's junior campus is now situated. By the 1980s, it was felt that the site could no longer meet the needs of the school, and years of intense lobbying for improved facilities followed. After the Government of New South Wales decided to close Crows Nest Boys High School, the site was earmarked for North Sydney Girls High with the move to its current location, following a $6 million building and renovations project occurring in December 1993.

School gardens

== Academics ==
=== Enrolments ===
North Sydney Girls is an academically selective high school; admission to the school for Year 7 is determined by results in the Selective High Schools test, which is open to all Year 6 students in NSW. A small number of students from other high schools are accepted into years 8 to 12, with applications made to the school to sit for an entrance exam.

=== Award system ===
At North Sydney Girls High School, awards are given based on academic performance, sport performance, service to school and other merits across all years.

=== Academic results ===
In 2001, The Sun-Herald ranked North Sydney Girls High School first in Australia's top ten girls' schools, based on the number of its alumnae mentioned in the Who's Who in Australia. In 2022, North Sydney Girls High School ranked as the fourth high school in the state, based on the percentage of exams sat that achieved a Distinguished Achievers (DA).

Generally, around 20-30% of students earn ATAR ranks between 99-99.95.

== Co- and extracurricular activities ==
NSGHS offers a diverse range of extracurricular activities.

=== Music and drama ===
NSGHS has a theatresports troupe, junior drama ensemble, Year 10 drama night, and various clubs available to seniors.

Instrumental ensembles and bands include the advanced string ensemble, stage (jazz) band, jazz ensemble, concert band, symphony orchestra, wind orchestra, wind ensemble, and beginner band. Choirs and vocal ensembles include Year 7 choir, junior choir, intermediate choir, combined (NSGHS & NSBHS) choir, senior vocal, and the a capella group.

=== Sport and outdoor activity ===
Co-curricular sports include basketball, skiing, hockey, cricket, badminton, table tennis, taekwondo, rowing, kayaking, touch football, water polo, fencing, netball, tennis, and volleyball. NSGHS also has a chess club, dance ensembles, and a cadet program at Marist Catholic College North Shore, and has had students participate in the Duke of Edinburgh Award Scheme.

== Notable alumnae ==
=== Academic ===
- Dame Valerie Beral – breast cancer epidemiologist
- Anna Katherine Donald – Rhodes Scholar (1989)
- Dame Janet Ritterman – former director of the Royal College of Music in London, from 1993 to 2005.

=== Entertainment, media and the arts ===
- Benita Collings – Play School presenter
- Ruth Cracknell – actress
- Ceridwen Dovey – author
- Jill Hellyer – author and poet
- Elsa Jacoby – actress and soprano
- Nathalie Kelley – actress
- Nicole Kidman – actress
- Samantha Lang – film and theatre director
- Catherine Martin – production designer
- Lucy Maunder – cabaret and theatre performer
- Janet Patterson – costume designer and production designer
- Cassandra Pybus – historian and author
- Margaret Throsby – ABC Classic FM presenter
- Naomi Watts – actress
- Wengie – YouTube personality, singer, voice actress
- Nina Oyama – comedian, writer, actor, and director
- Nagi Maehashi – cook, writer and businesswoman

=== Politics, public service and the law ===
- Sally Dowling – NSW Director of Public Prosecutions
- Shelley Hancock – teacher and parliamentarian; elected as a member of the NSW Legislative Assembly for South Coast (Liberal Party)
- Lucy McCallum – Chief Justice of the Supreme Court of the Australian Capital Territory
- Nancy Wake – resistance fighter known to the Germans as "the White Mouse"; the most decorated woman of World War Two

=== Sport ===
- Elise Simone Ashton (née Norwood) – Olympic water polo player

== Principals ==
The school principals have been:

Years	Principal
1914–1923	Janette Grossman
1924–1937	Ida Slack
1938–1941	Lilian Geer
1942–1949	Vera Howard
1950–1955	Elizabeth Booth
1956–1958	Edith Kane
1959–1962	Jessie Simons
1963–1968	Dorothy Dey
1969–1976	Joan Morris
1976–1982	Shirley Hokin
1982–1986	Joan Whittaker
1987–1990	Betty Anderson
1990–1996	Isobel Seivl
1997–2005	Louise Robert-Smith
2006–2012	Meredith Ash
2012–2018	David Tomlin
2019–present	Megan Connors

== See also ==
- List of government schools in New South Wales
- List of selective high schools in New South Wales
- North Sydney Boys' High School
