= Crows Nest, New South Wales =

Crows Nest
- Suburb
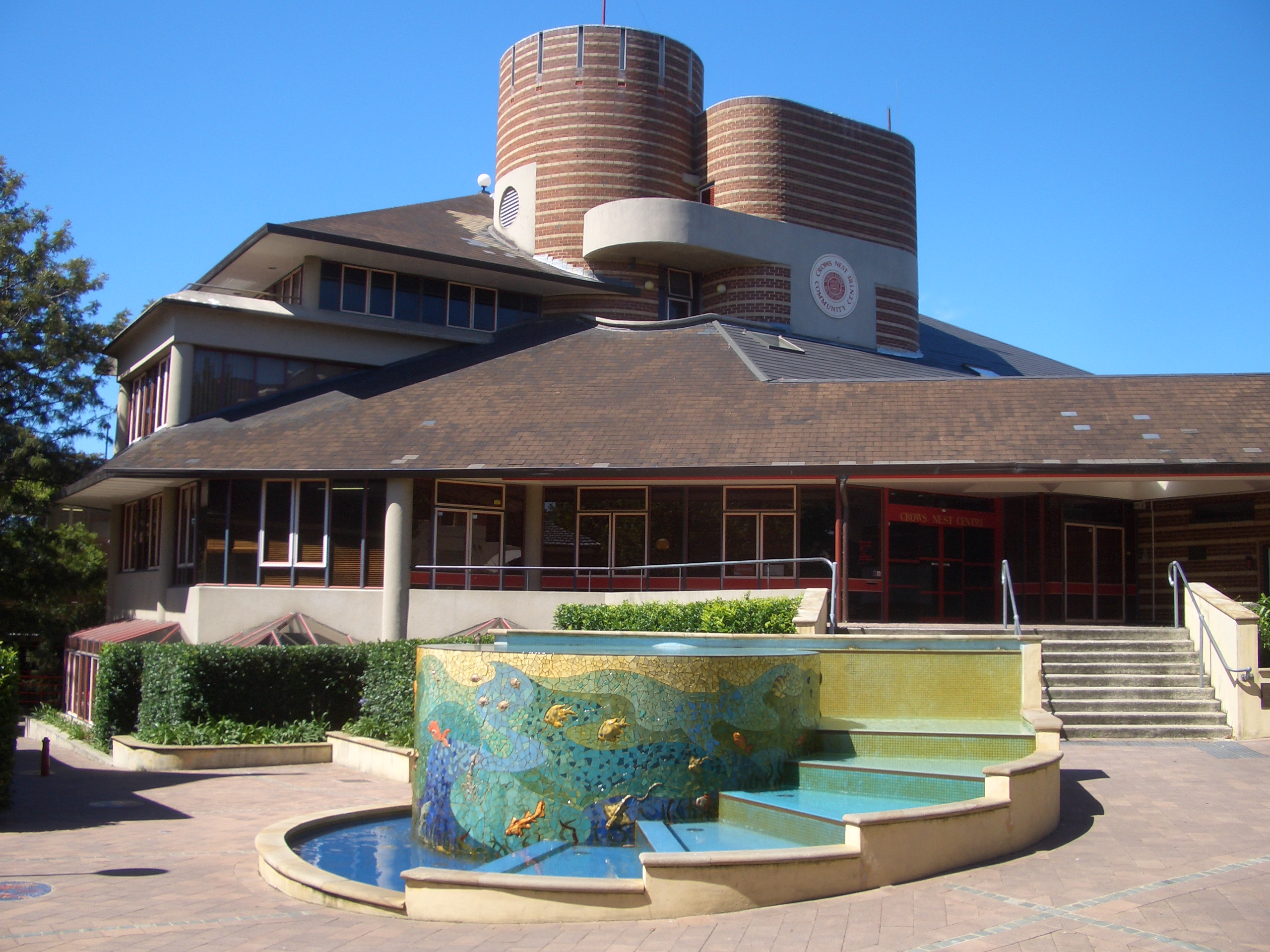
- Crows Nest Centre

- Interactive map of Crows Nest
- Country: Australia
- State: New South Wales
- City: Sydney
- LGA: North Sydney Council
- Location: 5 km (3.1 mi) N of Sydney CBD

Government
  - State electorate: Willoughby
  - Federal division: Warringah

Area
  - Total: 0.76 km^{2} (0.29 sq mi)
- Elevation: 93 m (305 ft)

Population
  - Total: 4,974 (2021 census)
  - Density: 6,540/km^{2} (16,950/sq mi)
- Postcode: 2065
Suburbs around Crows Nest
Willoughby	Naremburn	Cammeray
St Leonards	Crows Nest	Cammeray
Wollstonecraft	Waverton	North Sydney

Crows Nest is a suburb on the lower North Shore of Sydney, New South Wales, Australia. It is also part of the North Sydney region, 5 kilometres (3.1 mi) north of the Sydney central business district, in the local government area of North Sydney Council.

== History ==
Crows Nest was originally part of a 524-acre (2.12 km^{2}) land grant made to Edward Wollstonecraft in 1821. The grant extended from the site of the present day Crows Nest to Wollstonecraft. Edward Wollstonecraft built a cottage, the 'Crow's Nest' and, according to his business partner Alexander Berry, chose the name "on account of its elevated and commanding position". Berry later built a more substantial Crow's Nest House on the estate in 1850, taking the name of the earlier cottage. This site is now the site of North Sydney Demonstration School. The gates of Crows Nest House (added in the 1880s) still stand at the Pacific Highway entrance to the school. Berry died at Crows Nest House on 30 November 1873.

== Heritage listings ==
Crows Nest has some heritage-listed sites, including:

- 23 Albany Street: Electricity Power House

== St Thomas Rest Park ==
St Thomas Rest Park, located in West Street, was originally the cemetery of St Thomas's Church. It was the first burial ground established on Sydney's north shore. The land for the cemetery was donated to the Anglican Parish of St Leonards in 1845 by the prominent landowner and merchant, Alexander Berry. Notable people buried there include Alexander Berry and George Barney. Alexander Berry was buried there with his wife, in 1873, when he died at the age of 92. They are interred in an unusual, pyramid-shaped tomb with his wife's brother, Edward Wollstonecraft, former owner of Crows Nest Farm, after which the area is named. George Barney (lieutenant colonel) was born in London in 1792, and arrived in Sydney in 1835. He held a number of posts, including Commander of the Royal Engineers, and he designed Victoria Barracks. He was responsible for the completion of Fort Denison, Circular Quay, Cockatoo Dock and Darlinghurst Gaol.

The park includes the original Sexton's Cottage, which is now used as a museum of local history, and is heritage-listed.

== Population ==
At the 2021 census, there were 4,974 residents in Crows Nest. 57.0% of residents were born in Australia. The other most common countries of birth were England 5.6%, New Zealand 3.2%, China 3.1%, India 2.3% and Japan 1.8%. 71.5% of people only spoke English at home. Other languages spoken at home included Mandarin 3.9%, Cantonese 2.9%, Japanese 2.1%, Spanish 1.8% and French 1.3%. The most common responses for religious affiliation were No Religion 49.7% and Catholic 20.7%, Anglican 8.0%, 5.1% of residents did not state their religion, and 2.9% practised Buddhism.

The median age recorded at the 2021 census was 36. 36.0% of people were in the 25-39 year age group, compared to 21.5% nationally. The most common ancestries were English 32.9%, Australian 24.5%, Irish 12.5%, Chinese 10.9% and Scottish 10.4%.

== Commercial area ==
Crows Nest is a significant commercial district which is noted for its variety of shops and restaurants. It is centred on the junction of five main roads about 1 kilometre north by northwest of the original site of Crows Nest House.

== Transport ==
The Warringah Freeway runs along the northern border of Crows Nest and the Pacific Highway is a major road along the western border. Crows Nest railway station is a Sydney Metro station part of the Metro North West & Bankstown Line, opened on 19 August 2024.

== Gallery ==
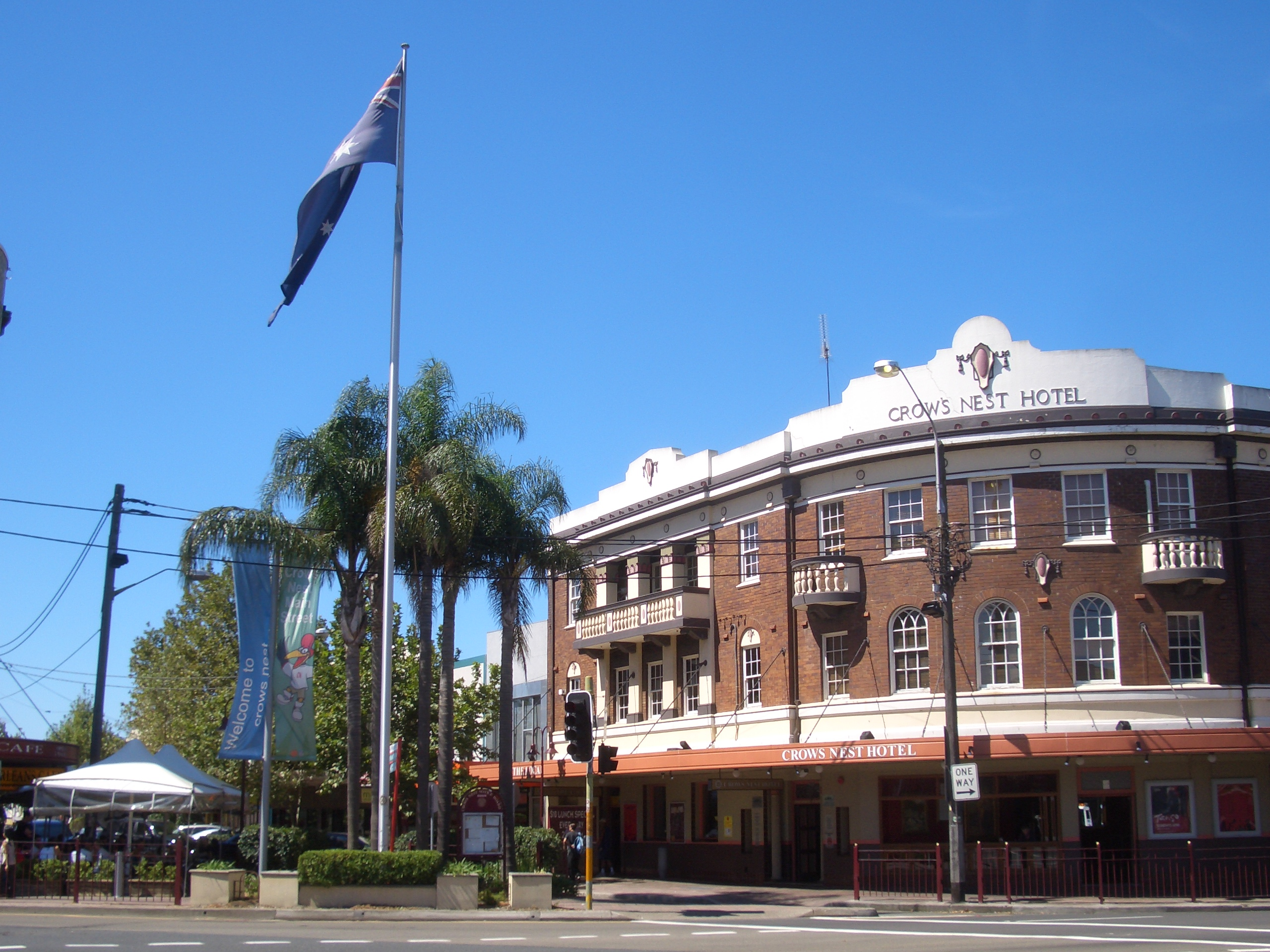
Crows Nest Hotel, Willoughby Road

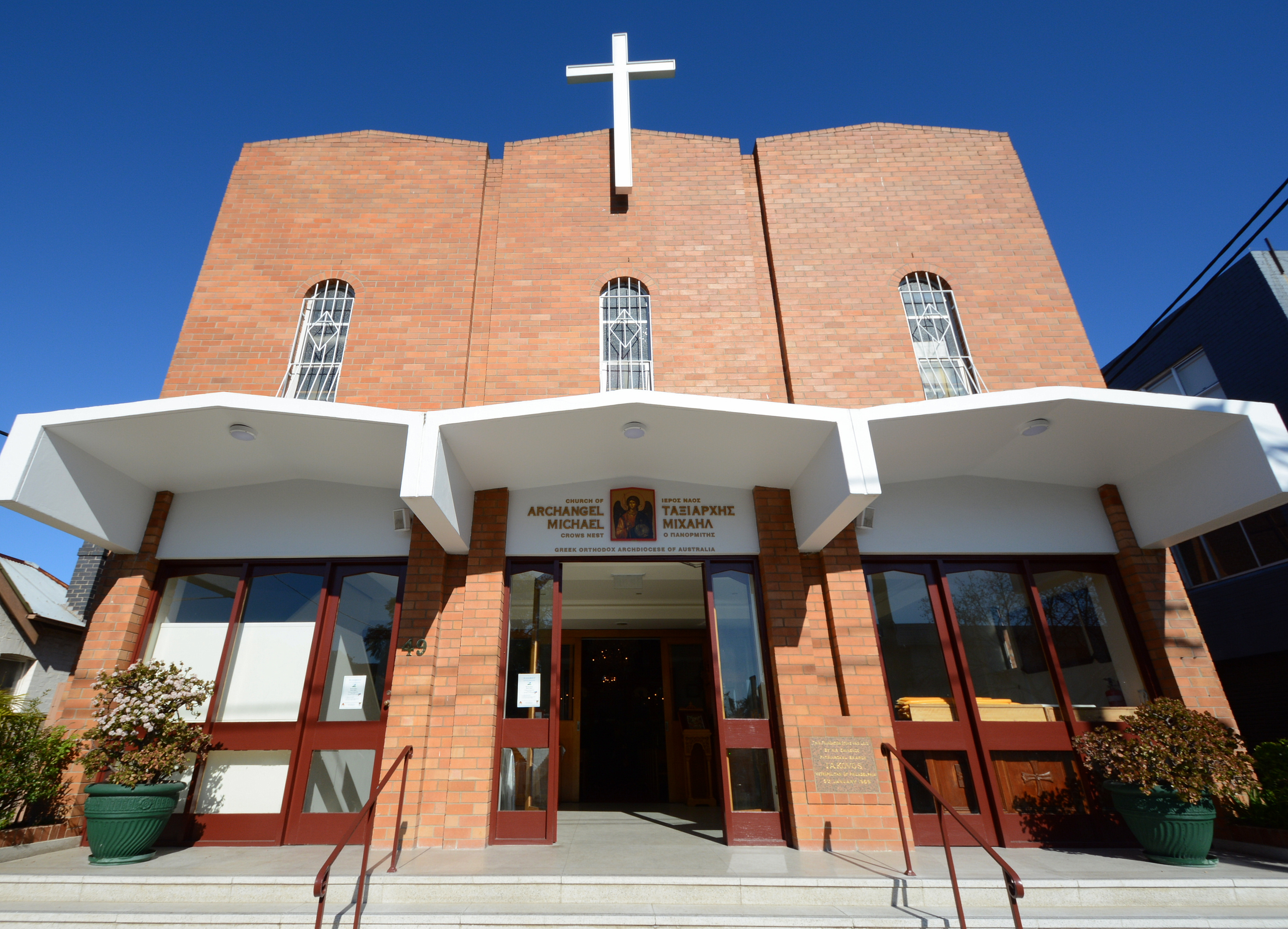
Greek Orthodox Church

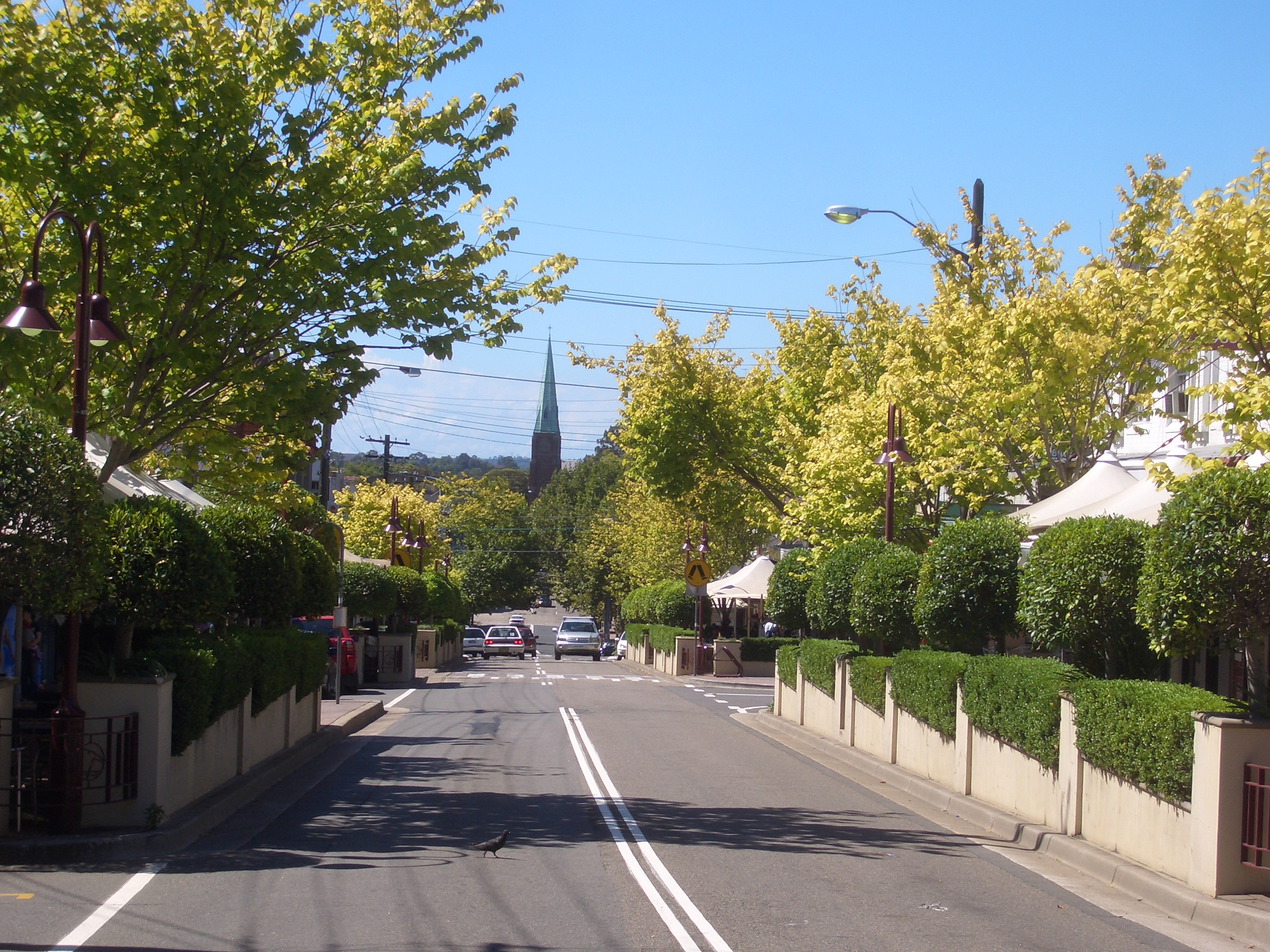
Willoughby Road, view north to Naremburn

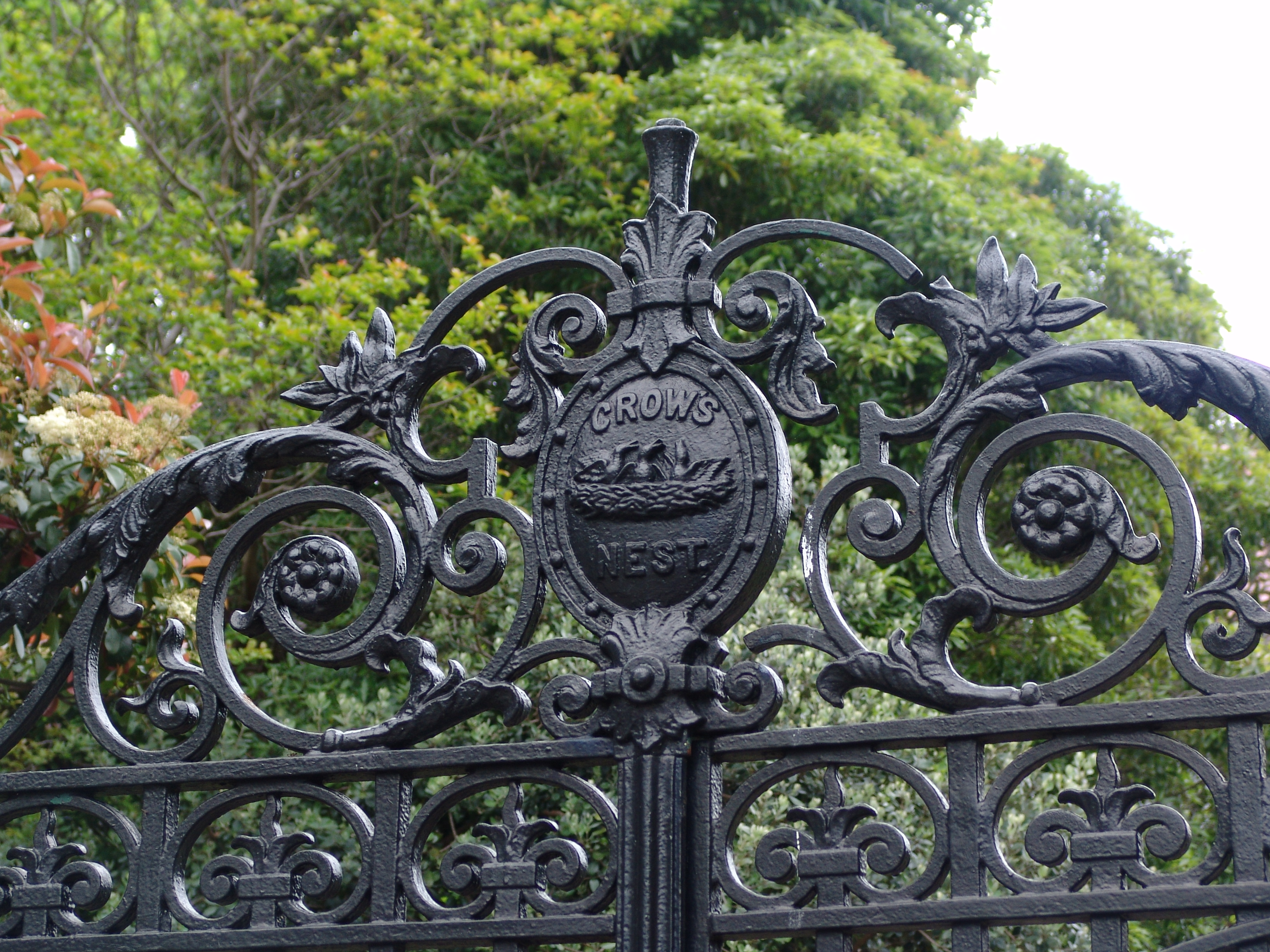
The Gates of Crow's Nest House

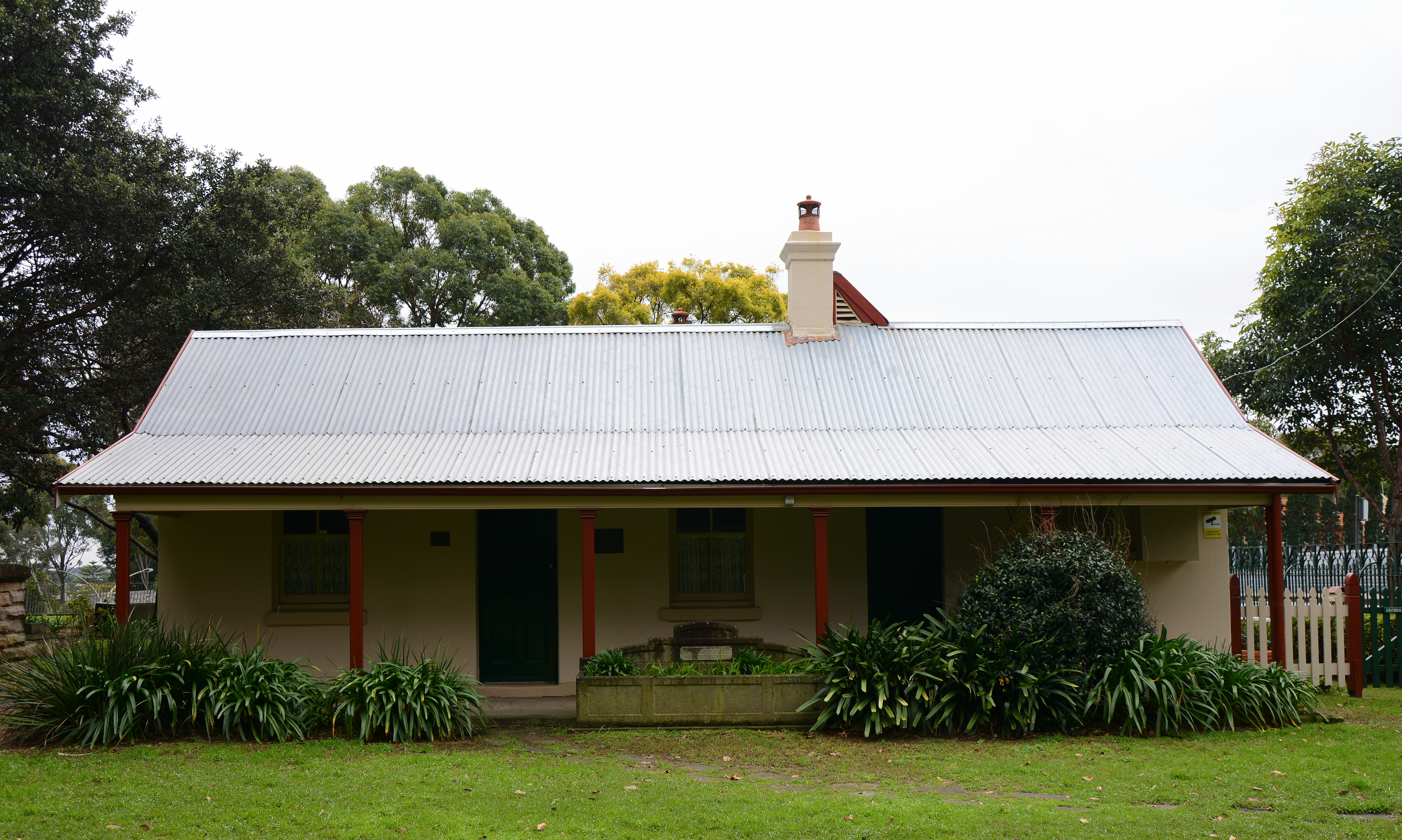
Sexton's Cottage Museum, St Thomas Rest Park

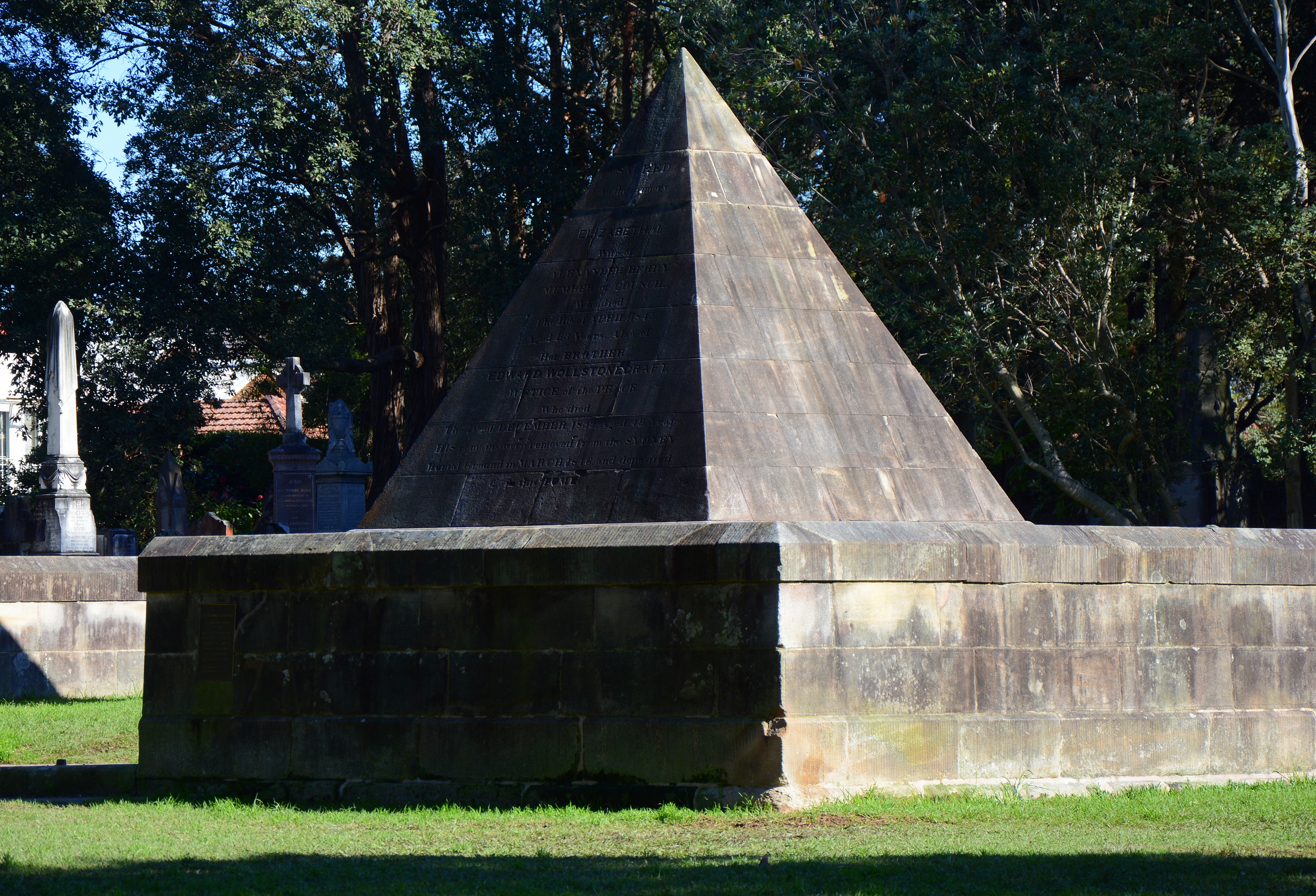
Grave of Alexander and Elizabeth Berry and Edward Wollstonecraft, St Thomas Rest Park

== Schools and colleges ==
- North Sydney Girls High School (which since 1994 has occupied the site of the former Crows Nest Boys High School)
- North Sydney Boys High School
- Cammeraygal High School

== Churches ==
- Northside Community Church
- Crows Nest Uniting Church
- Northside Baptist Church
- The Lighthouse Church
- St Michael Greek Orthodox Church
