= Chad Fischer =

American musician

- Genres: Alternative rock, indie rock
- Occupations: Musician, producer, songwriter
- Instruments: Vocals, guitar, bass, drums, keyboard
- Years active: 1991–present
- Labels: Fish of Death, Almo Sounds, Lookout Sound, Hollywood Records
- Member of: Lazlo Bane
- Formerly of: School of Fish, A Don Piper Situation
- Website: www.chadfischermusic.com

Chad Fischer is an American singer-songwriter, multi-instrumentalist, composer and producer from Santa Monica, California, also known as the frontman of the band Lazlo Bane, and author of the graphic novel, UltraViolet: A Space Adventure.

== Early years ==
Chad Fischer's early work was being a drummer for the band School of Fish founded by his college friend Josh Clayton-Felt. Fischer replaced the original drummer M.P. in 1991, however he did not play on the band's second album due to fallout with a producer and was replaced by Josh Freese. Nevertheless, Fischer still stayed with the band to perform live. The only official commercial School of Fish release that included his drumming was the single "Take Me Anywhere", which included two live tracks as b-sides.

After School of Fish disbanded in 1994 Chad Fischer went on to build his own recording studio and started to write new material. He signed to Almo Sounds label and formed the band Lazlo Bane, whose debut album, 11 Transistor was released in January 1997.

During the early years Chad Fischer met Colin Hay with whom he became a close friend. Fisher played drums on Hay's 1994 album Topanga, while Hay contributed guitar and vocals to Lazlo Bane's cover of "Overkill" from their debut album. Since then Chad Fischer took part in recording most of Colin Hay's albums, with Fischer's role varying from session musician and songwriter to mixing engineer and co-producer.

Fischer was briefly a member of Don Piper's band A Don Piper Situation playing drums on the self-titled 1997 EP and producing and engineering the track "Ray Falls Down".

== Work with Lazlo Bane ==
After Almo Sounds was bought by Universal Music Group in late 1990's Lazlo Bane continued their career as an independent band. Chad Fischer continued to produce Lazlo Bane albums which were recorded in his own studio and released through the self-established label both of which named Lookout Sound.

The band's second album All the Time in the World was released in 2002. It included the song "Superman", which became the Lazlo Bane's most recognizable song as it became a theme song for the popular American TV series Scrubs. Chad Fischer along with Lazlo Bane members Tim Bright and Chris Link as songwriters of "Superman" and Scrubs' composer Jan Stevens won BMI TV Music Award of 2003 and 2004.

Over the next decade Lazlo Bane released two more studio albums and one EP, all of them independently. Another album by the band, Big Spill, was released in 2013 and was credited to The Rage, Lazlo Bane's alter ego project.

In 2020's Lazlo Bane returned with new albums, Someday We'll Be Together (2021) and UltraViolet (2026).

== Solo career ==
In October 2019 Chad Fischer released his first non film and TV series related album of music titled National Parks which was dedicated to the American national parks and monuments.

In April 2020 Chad Fischer started releasing videos of music covers on a regular basis. The videos sometimes featured guest appearances by various musicians including long time Fischer's collaborators Larry Goldings, Colin Hay, and School of Fish band members among others. As of October 2021 Fischer released a total of eight videos. Seven songs from these recordings were included on Lazlo Bane album Someday We'll Be Together, which was released on 30 October 2021.

In early 2022 Chad Fischer participated in The Great Song Podcast and Dig Me Out podcast discussing his early musical career with School of Fish, Lazlo Bane, breakthrough of "Superman" as Scrubs theme song and recent video releases and Lazlo Bane reunion.

In July 2022 Fischer released a new video, the cover of The Jayhawks "Blue".

In May 2023 Fishcer took part in Abandoned Albums podcast.

== Films and TV series scoring ==
=== Films ===
In the beginning of 2000s Chad Fischer started providing music and songs for various films and TV shows.

His first full-length film for which he provided the scores was Garden State, released in 2004. Both the film and its soundtrack proved to be critically and commercially acclaimed. Garden State also featured Fischer's original song called "Motorcycle Ride with Sam." It hasn't been officially released, but it is available to listen in the DVD menu of the film and on his Myspace page.

2005's Little Manhattan featured new songs, both by Fischer and Lazlo Bane, that were written especially for the film. It also featured a cover of The Beatles' song "In My Life" produced by Fischer and performed by Matt Scannell. No soundtrack album was ever released, although one of Fischer's songs, "Map of My Heart", is available to listen on his Myspace page. However, promotional compilation of Chad Fischer's music from Garden State and Little Manhattan also featuring his production work was released circa 2005.

For the 2008 film The Rocker Chad Fischer wrote the score and a number of original songs which were performed by fictional bands A.D.D. and Vesuvius. The actual music was mostly performed by Chad Fischer himself with the vocals provided by Teddy Geiger (for A.D.D.) and Keith England (for Vesuvius). A soundtrack album that featured all the original material was also released in 2008.

In the 2009 film Ice Age: Dawn of the Dinosaurs, Chad sings a version of Gilbert O'Sullivan's "Alone Again (Naturally)".

Other films for which Fischer wrote the score are 10 Years, Loosies, The Babysitters, Black Cloud and Chasing Mavericks.

In 2018, Fischer returned to film scores with Eat, Brains, Love directed by Rodman Flender.

Wildflower, a new film with score by Chad Fischer, premiered in 2022.

Aside from film scores Chad Fischer wrote and performed a number of songs for the films he worked on, however none of them were released on any soundtrack albums or elsewhere.

=== TV series ===
Chad Fischer's early work on TV scores include shows My Guide to Becoming a Rock Star and The Class.

In 2007 Chad Fischer and Lazlo Bane guitarist Tim Bright started scoring American medical drama series Private Practice. During its run Fischer and Bright won BMI TV Music Award four times: in 2008, 2009, 2010 and 2012. The show concluded after six seasons in 2013.

After Private Practice Chad Fischer started providing music for another ABC's show, Scandal. For his work he won the BMI TV Music Award six times from 2013 to 2018.

In early 2018 the show's score album was released, consisting entirely of Chad Fischer's music. Scandal itself has also ended in 2018.

In 2016 Fischer started scoring yet another ABC's TV series The Catch. The show ended in 2017.

After ABC shows Chad Fischer scored the first season of the YouTube Premium original anthology 2019 series Weird City.

== Record producer ==
Chad Fischer started production work from the first Lazlo Bane album 11 Transistor and produced every subsequent album of the band.

After the death of Fischer's longtime friend and School of Fish bandmate Josh Clayton-Felt, he co-executive produced the release of Center of Six, the second Clayton-Felt's posthumous album. It included several tribute songs produced by Chad Fischer and recorded by Josh's friends.

Fischer's production career progressed as he produced the first recordings and helped develop the sound of Cary Brothers, Alexi Murdoch and Joshua Radin. All of them later became successful musical acts.

The highly acclaimed Garden State soundtrack, released in 2004, subsequently winning a Grammy Award in 2005 and receiving platinum certification, featured two songs produced by Chad Fischer: "Blue Eyes" performed by Cary Brothers and "Winding Road" performed by actress Bonnie Somerville.

Other musicians and bands Fischer did production for feature Everlast, Lisa Loeb, Colin Hay and The Good Luck Joes among others.

== Discography ==
=== Studio albums ===
Year	Album details
2019	National Parks: An Instrumental Album: Released: October 9, 2019

=== Soundtrack albums ===
Year	Album details
2018	Scandal: Original Television Series Soundtrack: Released: January 19, 2018; Label: Hollywood Records

=== As featured artist ===
Year	Song	Album
2006	"Oye Como Va"	My Super Ex-Girlfriend: Original Motion Picture Soundtrack
2008	"The Rocker Score Suite"	The Rocker: Music from the Motion Picture
2009	"Alone Again"	Ice Age: Dawn of the Dinosaurs: Original Motion Picture Soundtrack
2012	"10 Years Score Suite"	10 Years: Original Motion Picture Soundtrack
2012	"Chasing Mavericks Score Suite"	Chasing Mavericks: Original Motion Picture Soundtrack

=== Songs written and performed for films ===
List of songs by Chad Fischer featured only in films and without a release anywhere else
Year	Song	Film	Notes
2001	"Bright Shiny Theme Song"	Bubble Boy	Written by Kevin Hunter & Chad Fischer. Performed by Chad Fischer, Kevin Hunter and Rachel Robinson
2002	"See the Day"	The First $20 Million Is Always the Hardest	
2004	"Motorcycle Ride with Sam"	Garden State	Instrumental
2005	"Miserable Life"	Little Manhattan	Written and performed by Chad Fischer and Lyle Workman
2005	"Map of My Heart"	Little Manhattan	Available to listen at Chad Fischer's Myspace page
2007	"Come On"	Firehouse Dog	
2007	"Bye Bye Bye"	The Babysitters	Written and performed by Sia and Chad Fischer
2010	"Frank & Beans"	Furry Vengeance	
2012	"O'Hare Air Jingle"	The Lorax	

=== Music videos ===
List of music videos, showing year released
Title	Year	Director	Album
"Tomorrow Never Comes"	2008	Brooke Sasick	N/A
"Yosemite"	2019		National Parks
"Yellowstone"	2019		National Parks
"Craters of the Moon"	2019		National Parks
"Shenandoah"	2019		National Parks
"Gates of the Arctic"	2020		National Parks
"A Life of Illusion"	2020	Chad Fischer	Someday We'll Be together
"Nature's Way"	2020	Chad Fischer	N/A
"Dear God"	2020	Chad Fischer	Someday We'll Be together
"3 Strange Days"	2020	Chad Fischer	Someday We'll Be together
"You've Got a Friend"	2020	Chad Fischer	Someday We'll Be together
"I'll Do Everything"	2020	Chad Fischer	Someday We'll Be together
"Big Shot"	2020	Chad Fischer	Someday We'll Be together
"Our House"	2021	Chad Fischer	Someday We'll Be together
"Blue"	2022	Chad Fischer	N/A

As director

List of music videos, showing year released
Title	Year	Artist
"Send Somebody"	2011	Colin Hay
"Love Is Eveywhere"	2022	Colin Hay

=== With Lazlo Bane ===
Studio albums

Year	Album details
1997	11 Transistor: Released: January 8, 1997; Label: Almo Sounds
2002	All the Time in the World: Released: September 27, 2002; Label: Self-released
2006	Back Sides: Released: April 11, 2006; Label: Self-released
2007	Guitly Pleasures: Released: July 10, 2007; Label: Lookout Sound
2013	Big Spill (The Rage): Released: April 23, 2013; Label: Lookout Mountain
2021	Someday We'll Be Together (Lazlo Bane & Friends): Released: October 30, 2021; Label: Self-released

EPs

Year	Album details
1996	Short Style: Released: August 20, 1996; Label: Almo Sounds
2012	Guilty Pleasures the 80's Volume 1: Released: October 16, 2012; Label: Lookout Sound

=== With A Don Piper Situation ===
EPs

Year	Album details
1997	A Don Piper Situation: Released: 1997; Label: Scrimshaw Records

=== As producer, engineer, composer or session musician ===
Year	Subject	Collaborator	Comment
1994	Topanga	Colin Hay	drums, tambourine
1995	Sins of Our Fathers	Andy Prieboy	drums, percussion, vocals
1996	Xtended Play	Star 69	song "Girl from Mars" recorded and mixed by Chad Fischer (also b-side to "I'm Insane" single)"
1997	Eating February	Star 69	song "Rotten Punch" recorded and mixed by Chad Fischer, also credited as additional musicican
1998	Transcendental Highway	Colin Hay	Drums, Percussion, Guitar, Backing Vocals
1999	Another True Fiction	Jeremy Toback	co-writer of the song "You Make Me Feel"
2000	The Notorious One Man Orgy	Josh Freese	recorded and mixed by Chad Fischer
2001	Complicated '00	Andras Jones	Chad Fischer co-written, produced, played drums and guitar on "Mystery Behind", drums on "Complicated O"
2001	Going Somewhere	Colin Hay	mastering, co-writer of the song "Lifeline"
2001	Ali: Original Motion Picture Soundtrack	Everlast	Chad Fischer co-produced the song "The Greatest" with Everlast and Keefus Ciancia
2001	The Dog Days of Summer	GIVE	mixing
2001	King Of Yesterday	Jude	co-writer of "Everything's Alright (I Think It's Time)", guitars on "King Of Yesterday", backing vocals on "The Not So Pretty Princess", co-producer on "Oh Boy"
2002	Spirit Touches Ground	Josh Clayton-Felt	Chad Fischer plays drums and does mixing
2002	Company of Strangers	Colin Hay	co-writer of the songs "No Win Situation", "How Long Will It Last", "Lifeline", piano, drums, percussion, background vocals, engineer, mixing
2002	Hello Lisa	Lisa Loeb	co-writer of the song "Take Me Back"
2002	Four Songs	Alexi Murdoch	Bass, Drums, Percussion, Keyboards, Со-Producer
2003	Man @ Work	Colin Hay	Chad Fischer provides percussion, drums, recorder, background vocals, loops and drum programming, and also acts as engineer and does mixing
2003	"Don't Bring Me Down"	Sia	co-writer of the b-side "Broken Biscuit"; later included on the 2006 US reissue of the album Colour the Small One
2004	Modern Drummer Presents Drum Nation Volume One	Josh Freese	recorded and mixed the song "Lagerborg"
2004	Garden State: Music from the Motion Picture	Bonnie Somerville	Fischer produced the song "Winding Road"
2004	Riding the Wave	The Blanks	The cover of Lazlo Bane's "Superman" is produced by Fischer
2004	Fast Too Slow	Samsara	drums, rhodes and additional recording on the cover of Lazlo Bane's "Trampoline"
2005	Sky High: Original Soundtrack	Cary Brothers	producer of the cover of Spandau Ballet's "True"
2006	We Were Here	Joshua Radin	piano
2007	Best Days	Matt White	bass, drums, guitar, keyboards, percussion, engineer, co-writer of the song "Just What I'm Looking For"
2007	Are You Lookin' at Me?	Colin Hay	drums on "This Time I Got You" and "Me and My Imaginary Friend", percussion on "This Time I Got You", co-producer on "This Time I Got You" and "I Wish I Was Still Drinking", engineer, mixing
2007	Better for the Metaphor	Cantinero	drums
2007	Hopeful Romantic	Renee Stahl	drums
2007	The Ten: Film Soundtrack	Peter Salett	Fischer produced the song "The End of the End of the Ten"
2007	Long Story Short	Larry Goldings	percussion on "Northeast Direct" and "Foot", producer, recording, mixing, cover art
2007	Here Right Now	Graham Colton	co-writer of the song "Forget About You"
2008	Wilderness	Mad Buffalo	drums on the "Rainy Day"
2009	American Sunshine	Colin Hay	bongos on "Prison Time", backing vocals on "The End of Wilhelmina"
2011	Gathering Mercury	Colin Hay	drums, percussion, piano, backing vocals, bass guitar, xylophone, bells, mellotron, mixing, additional engineering
2012	10 Years: Original Motion Picture Soundtrack	Oscar Isaac	producer of the song "You Ain't Going Nowhere" (film credit also stated Chad Fischer as a performer along with Kate Mara)
2015	Next Year People	Colin Hay	drums, tambourine, bass, piano; co-producer of the song "Are We There Yet", engineer on the songs "Are We There Yet" and "Lived in Vain"
2015	Left Brained, Right Hearted	Michelle Citrin	shakers, tambourines and conga
2017	"Satisfaction"	GIVE	mixing, dates to 2001
2017	Salma Har	Tom Rossi	recording and mixing
2017	"You and Me"	GIVE	recording, mixing, dates to 2002
2019	"Holding It Down"	GIVE	recording, mixing, dates to 2002
2019	December Wildfire	Ian Bowers	mixing
2020	"Feeling Good"	GIVE	mixing, dates to early 2000's
2020	"Standing in the Rain"	GIVE	recording, mixing, dates to 2002
2021	I Just Don't Know What to Do with Myself	Colin Hay	guitar, bass, piano, drums, percussion, harmonica, banjo, harmoniuum, mellotron, vocals, mixing, engineer, orchestration
2022	Now and the Evermore	Colin Hay	backing vocals and mixing on "The Sea Of Always" and "Starfish And Unicorn", mixing on "Love Is Everywhere"
2024	"Beautiful Goodbyes"	Penelope Simone	producer
2025	"The Valley"	Penelope Simone	producer
