= Someday We'll Be Together (album) =

Studio album by Lazlo Bane & Friends
- Released: October 30, 2021
- Recorded: 2020–2021
- Genres: Alternative rock, pop, new wave
- Length: 46:33

Lazlo Bane chronology
| Guilty Pleasures the 80's Volume 1 (2012) | Someday We'll Be Together (2021) | UltraViolet (2026) |

Someday We'll Be Together is the fifth studio album by the band Lazlo Bane. It is the first band's release in 9 years since 2012 EP Guilty Pleasures the 80's Volume 1.

The part of the album are re-recordings of Lazlo Bane songs and the other part are cover versions of the songs ranging from the early 1970s to the early 1990s.

== Overview ==
The recordings which eventually resulted in the album's release originated as home recordings by Chad Fischer in early 2020 during the COVID-19 lockdown. The recordings were originally released as videos credited to Chad Fischer with the first being "A Life of Illusion" originally by Joe Walsh.

The first song which was credited to Lazlo Bane was a re-recording of "Superman", released in May 2020. The video featured a number of guest appearances including Scrubs stars Zach Braff and Neil Flynn.

As the releases continued various guest musicians also took part in recordings, including longtime Lazlo Bane collaborators Colin Hay, Larry Goldings and Lyle Workman. Other notable guests include the original School of Fish members who reunited for the new version of "3 Strange Days".

A total of 13 videos were released over the course of one and a half years, with the last song being David Bowie's "Life on Mars". The release was followed by the announcement of the new Lazlo Bane album Someday We'll Be Together which included 12 of the previously video only songs. The track that was released as a video but not included on the album was "Nature’s Way" originally by Spirit.

The release of the album was accompanied by the video advertising.

== Track listing ==
| No. | Title | Writer(s) | Original artist | Length |
|---|---|---|---|---|
| 1. | "Trampoline" | Chad Fischer, Tim Bright, Chris Link | Lazlo Bane | 3:04 |
| 2. | "1975" | Fischer | Lazlo Bane | 2:38 |
| 3. | "3 Strange Days" (featuring School of Fish) | Josh Clayton-Felt, Michael Ward | School of Fish | 4:45 |
| 4. | "I'm No Superman" | Fischer, Bright, Link | Lazlo Bane | 4:08 |
| 5. | "Dear God" (featuring Lyle Workman & Amelia Dektor) | Andy Partridge | XTC | 4:08 |
| 6. | "Big Shot" (featuring Larry Goldings) | Billy Joel | Billy Joel | 4:25 |
| 7. | "I'll Do Everything" | Fischer, Jon Simon | Lazlo Bane | 3:27 |
| 8. | "A Life of Illusion" | Joe Walsh | Joe Walsh | 3:06 |
| 9. | "You've Got a Friend" (featuring Louise Goffin & Colin Hay) | Carole King | Carole King | 4:53 |
| 10. | "Our House" | Graham Nash | Crosby, Stills, Nash & Young | 2:58 |
| 11. | "Ship of Fools" | Karl Wallinger | World Party | 4:26 |
| 12. | "Life on Mars" | David Bowie | David Bowie | 4:35 |
| Total length: | | | | 46:33 |

== Personnel ==
Lazlo Bane

- Chad Fischer – vocals, keyboards, guitar, drums
- Chris Link – bass, vocals
- Tim Bright – guitar, vocals
- Chicken – drums, vocals

Additional personnel

- Larry Goldings – keyboards, vocals on "Big Shot", keyboards on "Ship of Fools" and "You’ve Got a Friend"
- Colin Hay – vocals on "You’ve Got a Friend"
- Louise Goffin – vocals on "You’ve Got a Friend"
- Dan Rothchild – bass, vocals on "You’ve Got a Friend"
- Michael Ward – guitar on "3 Strange Days"
- M.P. – drums on "3 Strange Days"
- Dominic Nardini – bass guitar on "3 Strange Days"
- Amelia Dektor – vocals on "Dear God"
- Lyle Workman – guitar and vocals on "Dear God"
- Mira Wang – violin on "Dear God"
- Jan Vogler – cello on "Dear God"
- Violet Fischer – vocals on "Dear God"
