= All the Time in the World (Lazlo Bane album) =

Studio album by Lazlo Bane
- Released: September 27, 2002
- Studios: Lookout Sound, Los Angeles, California
- Genres: Alternative rock, power pop, indie rock
- Length: 45:27 (CD); 43:34 (Digital); 44:01 (LP)
- Label: Self-released
- Producer: Chad Fischer

Lazlo Bane chronology
11 Transistor (1997)	All the Time in the World (2002)	Back Sides (2006)

All the Time in the World is the second studio album by the band Lazlo Bane. It was self-released by the band more than five years after their debut album, 11 Transistor.

== Background and release ==
The work on the album started in late 1990s when the band was still signed to Almo Sounds label. According to Chad Fischer the release of the album was shelved around 2000 as the label was sold to Universal Music Group. Lazlo Bane managed to acquire the album from Almo Sounds but struggled to release it by themselves.

Early self released promo copies of the album was distributed in 2000, while the first commercially released track was "Superman" as it appeared on the soundtrack for the film The Tao of Steve.

During that period "Superman" was noticed by Zach Braff and later became the theme song for the television series Scrubs.

All the Time in the World finally received an official release on CD and as a digital download through CD Baby in September 2002.

Unlike the band's debut 11 Transistor with its guitar-heavy stylings, the songs on All the Time in the World expand the variety of instruments and feature banjo, piano, saxophone and strings. While working on the album the band wrote a large number of new songs, much more than were released. Some of them were included on the band's next release, Back Sides.

=== Versions and differences ===
There are several differences between the early 2000 promo and the official 2002 releases. The CD promo edition featured the song "I'll Be Happy" as track 11, which was replaced with "Breathe Me In" on the 2002 CD release. Another difference was that the hidden track came as a separate track after a track of silence, similar to what was done on the band's previous album 11 Transistor.

The 2002 digital edition of the album omits the hidden track after the song "Crooked Smile" and includes "I'll Be Happy" as the eleventh track while it is incorrectly titled as "Breathe Me In". It can be heard through the preview and judged by the length of the track - for "I'll Be Happy" it is 4:16 instead of 4:43 for "Breathe Me In".

In 2018 the album was remastered and reissued on vinyl by German label Lonestar Records. The release was made on electric blue vinyl limited to 500 copies. The vinyl edition included "Breath Me In" as track 11, but omitted a hidden track at the end of the album.

== Uses in other media ==
"Superman" was used as the theme song for the television series Scrubs

The title track was featured in 2002 film The First $20 Million Is Always the Hardest.

The song "Hold Me" was featured in 2005 film Her Minor Thing.

== Reception ==
Gene Triplett of the NewsOK called the album "fun-loving package, all richly-layered with voices, strings, piano and guitar", noting the title track, "Trampoline", "Scene of the Crime" and "Breathe Me In", comparing the last two with "Hotel California"-era Eagles.

All the Time in the World was ranked #1 at the 2004 Just Plain Folks Music Awards in the category College Rock Album, with "Superman" and the title track being ranked #2 and #6 in the category College Rock Song respectively.

== Track listing ==
All songs written whole or in part by Chad Fischer, Chris Link, Tim Bright and Robert Burke, except "Carbon Copy" by Chad Fischer and Kevin Hunter

1. "All the Time in the World" – 3:16
2. "Trampoline" – 3:05
3. "Superman" – 3:43
4. "Ship On the Wall" – 3:44
5. "Gold Miner Dream" – 4:10
6. "Carbon Copy" – 2:53
7. "Hold Me" – 2:51
8. "Out of Steam" – 5:03
9. "Are You Talking to Me?" – 2:02
10. "Scene of the Crime" – 4:06
11. "Breathe Me In" – 4:43
12. "Crooked Smile" – 4:25*
  - CD edition of the album contains an untitled hidden track which starts at 4:31, making total length of track 12 as 5:51.

Alternative track on the digital edition
No.	Title	Length
11.	"I'll Be Happy"	4:16

== Personnel ==
Lazlo Bane

- Chad Fischer – lead vocals, rhythm guitar, piano, keyboards, harmonica, mixing
- Chris Link – bass guitar, banjo, backing vocals
- Tim Bright – lead guitar, keyboards, backing vocals
- Chicken – drums, backing vocals

Additional personnel

- Sarah Thornblade – violin on "Ship on the Wall"
- Jason Freese – saxophone on "Hold Me"
- Larry Goldings – fender rhodes on "Hold Me"
- Camila Eriksson – photography
- Amy Link – photography
- Chauncey Gardener – photography
- Angela Hien – painting of the band

== Release history ==
Region	Date	Format	Label	Ref.
United States	September 27, 2002	CD, Digital download	Self-released	
United States	November 9, 2018	LP	Lonestar Records	
