= List of Scrubs soundtracks =

There are three soundtracks for the television series Scrubs. The first album was released as a CD, on September 24, 2002, by Hollywood Records. The second album was released in 2006 and features songs used in Season Two to Season Five. The third album contains songs from the sixth season musical episode My Musical and was released on various music downloading sites in 2007.

== Music from Scrubs ==
Music from Scrubs

Soundtrack album by Various artists
- Released: September 24, 2002
- Genres: Alternative rock; pop rock; folk rock
- Length: 52:23
- Label: Hollywood

Singles from Music from Scrubs
- 1. "Superman" Released: December 3, 2002 (promo)

The songs on Music from Scrubs are taken from the songs that are played in the episodes of season 1, with the exception of "Overkill" which was featured in the premiere of season 2.

Track list
No.	Title	Writer(s)	Performer	Length
1.	"Superman"	Chad Fischer; Chris Link; Tim Bright	Lazlo Bane	3:38
2.	"All In My Head"	Gerry Hansen; Shawn Mullins	Shawn Mullins	3:28
3.	"Fresh Feeling"	Kelly Logsdon; Mark Oliver Everett	Eels	3:37
4.	"Good Time"	Leroy	Leroy	3:29
5.	"Good Life"	Francis Dunnery	Francis Dunnery	3:22
6.	"New Slang"	James Mercer	The Shins	3:50
7.	"Beautiful World"	Colin Hay	Colin Hay	4:02
8.	"Hold on Hope"	Robert Pollard	Guided by Voices	3:33
9.	"Fighting For My Love"	Nil Lara	Nil Lara	4:07
10.	"Dracula from Houston"		Butthole Surfers	3:43
11.	"Hooch"		Everything	3:44
12.	"Hallelujah"	Leonard Cohen	John Cale	4:39
13.	"Have It All"	Jeremy Kay	Jeremy Kay	3:50
14.	"End Credit Score (Instrumental)"		Jan Stevens	0:28
15.	"Overkill"	Colin Hay	Colin Hay	2:53
Total length:				52:23

== Scrubs: Original Soundtrack – Vol. 2 ==
Scrubs: Original Soundtrack – Vol. 2

Soundtrack album by Various artists
- Released: May 9, 2006
- Genre: Soundtrack
- Length: 51:28
- Language: English
- Label: Hollywood Records

Singles from Scrubs: Original Soundtrack – Vol. 2
- 1. "I Want to Know"; 2. "Dreaming of You" Released: October 7, 2002

The songs on Scrubs: Original Soundtrack – Vol. 2 are taken from the songs that are played in the episodes of seasons 2 to 6.

Track list
No.	Title	Writer(s)	Performer(s)	Length
1.	"I Want to Know"	Albert Hammond; Michael Edward Hazlewood	The Mavericks	3:33
2.	"Dreaming of You"	James Skelly	The Coral	2:22
3.	"Our Love"	Rhett Miller	Rhett Miller	3:33
4.	"Why"	Diego Garcia	Elefant	3:54
5.	"Question"		Old 97's	2:17
6.	"In the Sun"	Joseph Arthur; Joseph Lyburn	Joseph Arthur	5:37
7.	"Winter"	Joshua Radin	Joshua Radin	3:25
8.	"Section 9 (Light & Day / Reach for the Sun)"	Tim DeLaughter	The Polyphonic Spree	3:30
9.	"Half"		G Tom Mac	3:35
10.	"Cindy"		Tammany Hall NYC	3:42
11.	"Diner"		Martin Sexton	3:04
12.	"My Brilliant Feat"	Colin Hay	Colin Hay	3:27
13.	"Honestly"		Cary Brothers	4:10
14.	"Sideways"	Clarence Greenwood	Citizen Cope	5:19
Total length:				51:28

== Scrubs: "My Musical" Soundtrack ==
Scrubs: "My Musical" Soundtrack

Soundtrack album by Various artists
- Released: August 7, 2007
- Genre: Soundtrack
- Length: 20:05
- Language: English
- Label: Hollywood Records

Singles from Scrubs: "My Musical" Soundtrack
- 1. "Are You Okay? Are You Alright?"; 2. "Welcome to Sacred Heart"

Scrubs: "My Musical" Soundtrack is the soundtrack released by Hollywood Records, Inc. It was released on August 7, 2007. The songs are taken from the original songs composed and performed in the season six episode "My Musical". "Welcome to Sacred Heart (Reprise)" starts off with J.D.'s final thoughts.

Tracklist
No.	Title	Performer(s)	Length
1.	"All Right"	Sarah Chalke; Stephanie D'Abruzzo; Zach Braff	0:43
2.	"Welcome to Sacred Heart"	Ken Jenkins; Cast of Scrubs	2:06
3.	"Everything Comes Down to Poo"	Donald Faison; D'Abruzzo; Braff	2:10
4.	"Gonna Miss You Carla"	Aloma Wright; Faison; Johnny Kastl; Judy Reyes; Jenkins; Neil Flynn; Robert Maschio; Sam Lloyd; The Blanks	2:09
5.	"The Rant Song"	John C. McGinley; Flynn; D'Abruzzo; Braff	2:25
6.	"Options"	Reyes; Chalke	0:17
7.	"When the Truth Comes Out"	Cast	2:25
8.	"Guy Love"	Faison; Braff	2:34
9.	"For the Last Time I'm Dominican"	Faison; Reyes	1:56
10.	"Finale: Friends Forever / What's Going to Happen"	D'Abruzzo; Cast; Braff	2:37
11.	"Welcome to Sacred Heart (Reprise)"	D'Abruzzo	0:43
Total length:			20:05
