= All New People =

English comedy play

- Written by: Zach Braff
- Original language: English
- Genre: Comedy
- Setting: Long Beach Island, New Jersey

Premiere
- Date premiered: July 25, 2011
- Place premiered: Second Stage Theatre; New York City

All New People is a 2011 play by Zach Braff set on Long Beach Island and centers on Charlie, a 35-year-old from Braff's home state of New Jersey.

The play Premiered at Second Stage Theatre and subsequently moved to tour the UK, playing in Manchester, Glasgow and finally in London, in early 2012.

== Plot ==
The play is set in a trendy beach house, and begins with a suicide attempt by Charlie. Emma, an expat Briton, comes in and saves him. She is there to show the property to prospective tenants. Emma infers that her fortuitous arrival was divine intervention, and sets about trying to help Charlie. She calls in Myron, a Long Island fire-fighter (and drug dealer) to help. Finally, Kim, an escort girl provided by one of Charlie's friends, arrives.

Charlie announces that he has killed six people, as an explanation for why he was trying to kill himself. As the play progresses, the reasons of how each of the other people came to be there are revealed. In the initial run, this was achieved with a series of projected filmed interludes. Charlie finally reveals how his trauma came about through seeing a pair of ants fighting over a crumb.

== Cast ==
Character	2011 run	2012 run
Charlie	Justin Bartha	Zach Braff
Emma	Krysten Ritter	Eve Myles
Myron	David Wilson Barnes	Paul Hilton
Kim	Anna Camp	Susannah Fielding

== Productions ==
The initial run was performed at the Second Stage Theatre and directed by Peter DuBois. The first stage of the UK tour was in Manchester at the Manchester Opera House between 8–11 February. The play was then taken to Glasgow playing at the King's Theatre between 14–18 February, before finally playing in London for 10 weeks at the Duke of York's Theatre from 22 February.
