= Trampoline (Lazlo Bane song) =

Song by Lazlo Bane

from the album All the Time in the World
- Released: September 27, 2002
- Studio: Lookout Sound, LA, CA
- Genre: Alternative rock
- Length: 3:05
- Songwriters: Tim Bright, Chad Fischer, Chris Link
- Producer: Chad Fischer

"Trampoline" is a song by American alternative rock band Lazlo Bane released on their second studio album All the Time in the World.

It was among the songs that the band performed during their live shows in 2007.

In March 2021 Lazlo Bane released a video for the new version of "Trampoline" as part of their online video releases. The song was later included on the album Someday We'll Be Together.

== Samsara version ==
The song was covered by Tim Bright's led band Samsara for their 2004 album Fast Too Slow and was recorded with assistance by Chad Fischer. Their version was nominated for the Just Plain Folks 2006 Music Awards in the category Rock Song.

"Trampoline" was performed by Samsara for the Fearless Music TV show with the song later appearing on the various artists live compilation albums: Fearless Live: Handshake and Fearless Sessions: Season. 5 Vol. 1 in 2015 and 2017 respectively.
