= Guilty Pleasures (Lazlo Bane album) =

Studio album by Lazlo Bane
- Released: July 10, 2007
- Recorded: January – May 2007
- Studio: Lookout Sound, LA, CA; 60 Cycle, Brooklyn, NY; The Basement, NY, NY
- Genre: Alternative rock
- Length: 79:23
- Label: Lookout Sound
- Producer: Chad Fischer, Lazlo Bane

Lazlo Bane chronology
Back Sides (2006)	Guilty Pleasures (2007)	Guilty Pleasures the 80's Volume 1 (2012)

Guilty Pleasures is a 2007 album by the band Lazlo Bane, consisting entirely of cover versions of various hits from the 1970s. Unlike the band's previous album, Back Sides, which was released only digitally through online music stores, Guilty Pleasures was released both on CD and digital download formats. It is also the only Lazlo Bane album where every member of the band sings lead vocals on at least one song.

== Overview ==
The project was first announced through the band's Myspace blog in January 2007 with the first song mentioned being "Stuck in the Middle with You".

The band ended up with the album containing 20 songs, almost all of which were originally released in the 1970s, except "I Love You" by Climax Blues Band, which was released on the album Flying the Flag and also as a single in 1980.

The titles of several songs were changed from their original ones. The first song, listed as "Get Right Back", is actually titled "Right Back Where We Started From". The fifth song, listed as "Lime in the Coconut", is simply titled "Coconut". The sixth song, listed as "Alone Again", is actually titled "Alone Again (Naturally)". The eleventh song "The Things We Do for Love" is listed as "Things We Do for Love".

The album features a number of guest musicians, including frequent Chad Fischer's collaborator Larry Goldings and the band Cleto and the Cletones, among others.

=== Cover artwork ===
The front cover of the album features four characters of the Funny Face Drink Mix, a popular late '60s and '70s powdered drink mix. The characters from left to right are: Rootin' Tootin' Raspberry, Goofy Grape, Jolly Olly Orange and Choo Choo Cherry.

== Promotion ==
Before the release of the album, the band revealed several upcoming songs through their Myspace blog. They included "Stuck in the Middle with You", "Lonely Boy" and "Baby Come Back". The band also released a video advertisement and a music video for the cover of 10cc's "I'm Not in Love".

In summer of 2007, the band went on tour in support of Guilty Pleasures, opening for Colin Hay on several dates.

A small video productions company, Clay Cow Productions, made two music videos for the songs "Lonely Boy" and "Alone Again". The latter was made after the request by Chad Fischer, who was impressed by Clay Cow's previous work, and was featured in Lazlo Bane's Myspace blog.

== Uses in other media ==
"Mama Told Me Not to Come" was featured in the film Bonneville and on the film's soundtrack. Though the film premiered in 2006, the soundtrack was released only in 2008, after the release of Guilty Pleasures.

"Stuck in the Middle with You" was featured in the 2014 film Let's Be Cops. The song was included on the soundtrack album for the film which was released on 9 December 2014.

== Track listing ==
Song	Original Artist	Original Writer	Length
1. "Get Right Back"	Maxine Nightingale	J. Vincent Edwards and Pierre Tubbs	4:03
2. "Stuck in the Middle with You"	Stealers Wheel	Joe Egan and Gerry Rafferty	3:27
3. "Lonely Boy"	Andrew Gold	Andrew Gold	4:03
4. "I'm Not in Love"	10cc	Eric Stewart and Graham Gouldman	5:20
5. "Lime in the Coconut"	Harry Nilsson	Harry Nilsson	4:08
6. "Alone Again"	Gilbert O'Sullivan	Gilbert O'Sullivan	4:05
7. "Baby Come Back"	Player	J.C. Crowley and Peter Beckett	4:25
8. "Take the Long Way Home"	Supertramp	Rick Davies and Roger Hodgson	4:55
9. "Nothing from Nothing"	Billy Preston	Billy Preston and Bruce Fisher	2:44
10. "I Can't Tell You Why"	The Eagles	Timothy B. Schmit, Glenn Frey and Don Henley	4:12
11. "Things We Do for Love"	10cc	Eric Stewart and Graham Gouldman	3:49
12. "Come and Get It"	Badfinger	Paul McCartney	2:16
13. "In the Summertime"	Mungo Jerry	Ray Dorset	3:31
14. "I Love You"	Climax Blues Band	Derek Holt	4:06
15. "Love Will Keep Us Together"	Captain & Tennille	Neil Sedaka and Howard Greenfield	3:26
16. "All By Myself"	Eric Carmen	Eric Carmen	5:32
17. "Cruel to Be Kind"	Nick Lowe	Nick Lowe and Ian Gomm	3:21
18. "Mama Told Me Not To Come"	Three Dog Night	Randy Newman	2:51
19. "Could It Be Magic"	Barry Manilow	Barry Manilow and Adrienne Anderson	5:38
20. "Highway to Hell"	AC/DC	Angus Young, Malcolm Young and Bon Scott	3:31

== Personnel ==
Lazlo Bane

- Chad Fischer – vocals, piano, guitar
- Chris Link – bass, banjo, lead vocals on "I Can't Tell You Why"
- Tim Bright – guitar, keyboards, lead vocals on "Lime in the Coconut"
- Chicken – drums, lead vocals on "Lime in the Coconut", "Nothing from Nothing", "In the Summertime", "Mama Told Me Not to Come" and "Highway to Hell"

Additional personnel

- Larry Goldings – piano on "Nothing from Nothing" and "Things We Do for Love"
- Jeff Babko – piano on "All By Myself", "Could It Be Magic" and trombone on "Nothing from Nothing"
- Cleto Escobedo III – alto saxophone on "Nothing from Nothing"
- Cleto Escobedo, Jr. – tenor saxophone on "Nothing from Nothing"
- Dr. E. G. Fischer – violin on "Alone Again"
- Professor Bill Fischer – trombone on "Alone Again"
- Jeanie Lim – viola on "Take the Long Way Home" and "Could It Be Magic"
- Alisha Baver – cello on "Take the Long Way Home" and "Could It Be Magic"
- Eric Wuest – violin on "Take the Long Way Home" and "Could It Be Magic"
- Cecilia Noël – background vocals on "Lime in the Coconut", "Mama Told Me Not to Come" and "Highway to Hell"
- Charissa Nielsen – background vocals on "Lime in the Coconut", "Mama Told Me Not to Come" and "Highway to Hell"
- Dana Nielsen – background vocals on "Lime in the Coconut", "Mama Told Me Not to Come" and "Highway to Hell"
- Scott Hull – mastering
- Chad Fischer – mixing
- Lazlo Bane – mixing
- Renee Faia – art direction, photography
- Noel Spirandelli – photography
- Charlie Paxson – photography

== Release history ==
Region	Date	Format	Label	Ref.
United States	July 10, 2007	Digital download	Lookout Sound	
United States	November 8, 2017	CD	Lookout Sound	
