= Short Style =

EP by Lazlo Bane
- Released: August 20, 1996
- Recorded: 1995–1996
- Studio: Cheswick Studio, LA, CA
- Genre: Alternative rock, indie rock, blues
- Length: 16:29
- Label: Almo Sounds
- Producer: Chad Fischer

Lazlo Bane chronology
Short Style (1996)	11 Transistor (1997)

Professional ratings
Review scores
Source	Rating
Allmusic	3/5 stars

Short Style is the EP by the American alternative rock band Lazlo Bane released on Almo Sounds label.

== Overview ==
Short Style features 5 tracks, 4 originals and a cover of Men at Work's song "Overkill", originally written by Colin Hay, who makes a guest appearance on the track. All of the songs from the EP appeared on the band's debut album 11 Transistor, which was released half a year later. However, the song "Prada Wallet" was not featured in the track listing and appeared as a hidden track.

The length of the song "Sleep" in incorrectly listed on the EP as 3:48, but it is actually the same version that was released on 11 Transistor.

== Track listing ==
No.	Title	Writer(s)	Length
1.	"Buttercup"	Chad Fischer / Lyle Workman	3:42
2.	"Sleep"	Fischer	4:48
3.	"Novakane"	Fischer	2:35
4.	"Overkill" (feat. Colin Hay)	Colin Hay	4:13
5.	"Prada Wallet"	Fischer / Josh Clayton-Felt / Kevin Hunter	1:11

== Personnel ==
- Lazlo Bane – primary artist
- Lyle Workman – guitar and bass on "Buttercup"
- Josh Freese – drums on "Buttercup" and "Prada Wallet"
- Colin Hay – guitar and vocals on "Overkill"
- David Dale – guitar on "Overkill"
- Tony Phillips – mixing

=== Additional personnel ===
- Jill Berliner – legal
- Keryn Kaplan – management
- Paul McGuinness – management
- Paul Kremen – artist & repertoire
- Robin Sloane – creative director
- Mary Lynne Barbis – art direction, design
- Patrick Raske – art direction, design
- Lauren Lambert – photography
