= The Rocker (film) =

2008 film by Peter Cattaneo

- Theatrical release poster
- Directed by: Peter Cattaneo
- Screenplay by: Maya Forbes; Wallace Wolodarsky
- Story by: Ryan Jaffe
- Produced by: Shawn Levy; Tom McNulty
- Starring: Rainn Wilson; Christina Applegate; Jeff Garlin; Josh Gad; Teddy Geiger; Emma Stone
- Cinematography: Anthony B. Richmond
- Edited by: Charles Kaplan; Brad E. Wilhite
- Music by: Chad Fischer
- Production companies: 21 Laps Entertainment; Fox Atomic
- Distributed by: 20th Century Fox
- Release dates: June 12, 2008 (CineVegas); August 20, 2008 (United States)
- Running time: 102 minutes
- Country: United States
- Language: English
- Budget: $15 million
- Box office: $6.6 million

The Rocker is a 2008 American comedy film directed by Peter Cattaneo and written by Maya Forbes and Wallace Wolodarsky, from a story by Ryan Jaffe. The film stars Rainn Wilson as a failed musician who goes on tour with his nephew's band after one of their songs goes viral. Christina Applegate, Jeff Garlin, Josh Gad, Teddy Geiger and Emma Stone also star.

The Rocker was released on August 20, 2008 to mixed reviews from critics, and was a box office bomb, that grossed just $6.6 million against a $15 million budget.

== Plot ==
In late 1986, Vesuvius, a rock band from Cleveland, Ohio, performs at a local theater and is offered a recording contract. When their manager tells them they will get to tour as the opening act for Whitesnake, Vesuvius decides to replace drummer Robert "Fish" Fishman with the president of the record company's nephew.

20 years later, Vesuvius remains an immensely successful band, while Fish lives a relatively ordinary life. Matt Gadman, Fish's high school-aged nephew, plays keyboards in an alternative rock band called A.D.D., along with his friends Curtis Powell and Amelia Stone. The band is scheduled to play their school's prom, but the gig is in jeopardy when their drummer gets suspended from school. Matt convinces the others to allow Fish to fill in. The gig starts great, as Fish's drumming skills have not diminished with time, but he gets carried away and launches into an impromptu drum solo during the last song of the evening, a slow song for the prom king & queen. However, Fish is so excited by Curtis' songs and the chance to play again, he convinces them to let him join the band if he can deliver another gig. After repeated failed attempts, he finally succeeds in securing a gig at a club in Fort Wayne, Indiana. Because the other members are all minors, they have to sneak out to the gig but are apprehended in the process.

After Fish is forced to rent the basement of his favorite Chinese restaurant, the band invents a new way to practice via four-way iChat. To the dismay of his bandmates, Fish performs in the nude due to the extreme heat in the restaurant basement. The video of the practice quickly goes viral under the title of the "naked drummer band". The band is signed to a recording contract by the same label as Vesuvius and is sent on a Midwest tour. However, Fish commits stereotypical rockstar acts, despite the physical costs on his body, and vandalizes a hotel room, causing the band to be apprehended again.

After securing A.D.D.'s release, Kim, Curtis's mother, promises the other parents she will stay for the remainder of the tour, so Fish's antics will not influence their children. Kim and Fish bond and gain feelings for one another. Fish also wises up his antics and becomes a better person, gaining the full respect of his bandmates.

The label asks A.D.D. to open a show for Vesuvius, honoring their induction into the Rock and Roll Hall of Fame. Fish refuses to play the gig and leaves the band, but Curtis eventually convinces him to put aside his resentment and play the show. After meeting Vesuvius before the show, Fish discovers that they have become vain and arrogant with faux British accents (except for the drummer who is English), and decides to take the high road and wish Vesuvius good luck. Fish and the band perform to a standing ovation. After their gig, Amelia and Curtis, as well as Fish and Kim, begin a relationship. During Vesuvius's set, the lead singer's microphone falls off the stand while the voice track of their song continues, revealing that they have been lip-syncing. The audience chants an encore for A.D.D., performing for the crowd once again.

== Cast ==
- Rainn Wilson as Robert "Fish" Fishman
- Christina Applegate as Kim Powell
- Josh Gad as Matt Gadman
- Teddy Geiger as Curtis Powell
- Emma Stone as Amelia Stone
- Jason Sudeikis as David Marshall
- Jane Lynch as Lisa Gadman
- Jeff Garlin as Stan Gadman
- Will Arnett as Lex Drennan
- Fred Armisen as Wayne Kerr
- Howard Hesseman as Nev Gator
- Lonny Ross as Timmy Sticks
- Bradley Cooper as Trash Grice
- Jon Glaser as Billy Ault
- Demetri Martin as Kip
- Aziz Ansari as Aziz
- Nicole Arbour as Trashy Groupy
- Pete Best as The Guy at the Bus Stop
- Jane Krakowski as Carol
- Samantha Weinstein as Violet
- Jonathan Malen as Jeremy
- Laura de Carteret as Amelia's Mom

== Production ==
The Rocker was mostly filmed in Toronto, Ontario, Canada, with some exterior shots filmed in Cleveland, Ohio from July to September 2007.

=== Soundtrack ===
The Rocker: Music from the Motion Picture

Soundtrack album by Various Artists
- Released: July 22, 2008
- Genres: Pop rock, heavy metal
- Length: 38:41
- Label: Columbia
- Producer: Chad Fischer

Professional ratings
Review scores
Source	Rating
Allmusic	2.5/5 stars

The official soundtrack for the film features all original songs performed by the fictional bands A.D.D. and Vesuvius. While A.D.D. also performed two covers in the film: "Nothin' But a Good Time", originally by Americаn glam metal band Poison, and "In Your Eyes", originally by British musician Peter Gabriel, only the first was included in the soundtrack.

Tracks credited to Teddy Geiger and attributed to the band A.D.D. in the film were recorded mostly by Chad Fischer with Geiger providing only lead vocals. The exception is a cover of "Nothin' But a Good Time", on which Teddy Geiger plays additional guitar. Track two "Bitter" and track nine "I'm So Bitter" are two versions of the same song with different arrangement and slightly different lyrics.

The actual vocals on Vesuvius songs are provided by Keith England. The song "Pompeii Nights" is a re-recording of The Rage song "Dirty Old Man" with different lyrics. The original was released on the album Big Spill. "Promised Land" is a new song recorded for the film by Chad Fischer and fellow Lazlo Bane member Tim Bright.

"The Rocker Score Suite" performed by Chad Fischer contains an excerpt of "Take No Prisoners" originally by The Rage from the album Big Spill.

==== Promotion ====
"Promised Land" was released as free downloadable content for the video game Rock Band, which is shown being played in the movie.

Chad Fischer also released a music video for the song "Tomorrow Never Comes" with his own lead vocals on YouTube.

==== Track listing ====
No.	Title	Writer(s)	Artist	Length
1.	"Tomorrow Never Comes"	Chad Fischer	Teddy Geiger	4:06
2.	"Bitter"	Fischer	Teddy Geiger	2:38
3.	"Living for the First Time"	Christopher Faizi / Ferraby Lionheart	Teddy Geiger	3:27
4.	"Down"	Lionheart / Faizi	Teddy Geiger	3:22
5.	"Great Escape"	Fischer	Teddy Geiger	2:27
6.	"Coming Through In Stereo"	Fischer / Patrick Houlihan	Teddy Geiger	3:07
7.	"Nothin' But a Good Time"	CC Deville / Bret Michaels / Richard Ream / Robert Kuykendall	Teddy Geiger	3:32
8.	"Too Far"	Fischer	Teddy Geiger	3:25
9.	"I'm So Bitter"	Fischer	Teddy Geiger	3:03
10.	"Promised Land"	Fischer / Tim Bright / Chris Link	Vesuvius	3:39
11.	"Pompeii Nights"	Chicken / Link / Bright / Fischer	Vesuvius	2:38
12.	"The Rocker Score Suite"	Fischer	Chad Fischer	3:28
Total length:				38:41

==== Personnel ====
- Chad Fischer – guitar, bass, drums, keyboards, glockenspiel, additional vocals
- Teddy Geiger – lead vocals (tracks 1–9), additional guitar (track 7)
- Keith England – lead vocals (tracks 10–11)
- Alex Lilly – additional vocals (tracks 1–6, 8)
- Patrick Houlihan – bass and additional vocals (track 7)
- Tim Bright – guitar (tracks 10–11), keyboards (track 10)
- Chris Link – bass (track 11)
- Chicken – additional vocals (track 11)
- Mike Knobloch – cowbell (track 10)
- Cecilia Noël – additional vocals (track 10)
- Charissa Nielsen – additional vocals (track 10)
- Scott Hull - mastering
- Maria Paula Marulanda – art direction
- George Kraychyk – stills photography

== Promotion ==
To promote the film, the song "Promised Land", as performed by the fictional band Vesuvius, was released as free downloadable content for the video game Rock Band, which is shown being played in the movie.

A viral marketing effort for the film was begun on August 11, 2008, when Rainn Wilson posted a message to the MySpace blog of Jenna Fischer, his co-star from The Office. According to his message, he had "kidnapped the lovely Jenna, put her, bound, in the trunk of my Firebird and logged onto her MySpace to send out this bulletin....To free America's sweetheart...you must attend my new movie, 'The Rocker', which opens August 20th....As soon as the film grosses 18.7 Mil, she will be released and given a peach smoothie." In the end the film was not even close to grossing that much money. A subsequent blog entry pointed readers to freejennanow.com, where videos were posted and features such as a "Free Jenna Game" and countdown tickers could be found.

'The Rocker: Live The Dream' was a competition to promote the film via MySpace and Kerrang! magazine in the UK. Over 1200 bands entered original songs at therockeruk for a chance to win a photo shoot and interview with Kerrang! magazine, a trip to the MySpace Black Curtain Screening in London, Gibson musical equipment and an assortment of 20th Century Fox merchandise. Ten bands went through to the final judging and Scottish band Alburn were chosen by Kerrang! editor Paul Brannigan, as the winner. Alburn dressed and posed as characters from the film in the Kerrang! photo shoot. Rainn Wilson recorded a video message for the winning band, which was played at the MySpace Black Curtain Screening.

A Flash game titled The Rocker: TV Toss was also released. In the game, the player controls Fish (in 1st person view). The objective is to do damage to the hotel room by tossing TVs at various objects. The high score is calculated by means of the cost of objects damaged.

== Reception ==
=== Critical response ===
On Rotten Tomatoes, the film holds an approval rating of 40% based on 121 reviews, with an average rating of 5.2/10. The site's critics consensus reads: "With a predictable and lightweight story, the earnest efforts of the cast are squandered by The Rocker's bland script." On Metacritic, the film has a weighted average score of 53 out of 100, based on 28 critics, indicating "mixed or average reviews". Audiences polled by CinemaScore gave the film an average grade of "B+" on an A+ to F scale.

=== Box office ===
The Rocker was released on August 20, 2008, in the US. It was a bomb at the worldwide box office, opening outside the Top 10 at #12 with $2.64 million for its first weekend, grossing less than $7 million overall during its entire theatrical run.
