= Trio Beyond =

Trio Beyond was a jazz organ trio that played a range of styles including avant-jazz fusion and hard bop, formed in 2003.

The trio was formed in 2003 by drummer Jack DeJohnette as a way of paying tribute to the importance of fellow drummer Tony Williams. Guitarist John Scofield and Larry Goldings, on electric piano, Hammond B-3 organ and sampling, joined. Goldings had been asked by Williams to join an organ trio in 1997, but the drummer died before the band could be formed.

A concert from the Queen Elizabeth Hall at the 2004 London Jazz Festival was released in 2006 as Saudades. The material was from a variety of bands and sources, including Williams's Lifetime band, Miles Davis' recordings with Williams from 1963 to 1967, Larry Young's Unity album, and originals by the Trio Beyond band members. Trio Beyond toured Europe in 2006.

In 2007, Scofield/Goldings/DeJohnette's Trio Beyond - Saudades (ECM) was recognized with a Best Instrumental Jazz Album Grammy nomination for their searing live recording at London's Queen Elizabeth Hall.

Jack DeJohnette died on October 26, 2025.
