= Epperley =

Epperley was an alternative rock band active in the 1990s from Tulsa, Oklahoma. The band released two full-length albums, Epperley (1996) and Sophomore Slump (1998). The band consisted of R. David Bynum, Matthew Nadar, David Terry and John Truskett.

== History ==
The band was formed by David Terry (vocals and guitar), Matthew Nader (guitar and vocals), R. David Bynum (bass) and John Truskett (drums). The band were signed to Triple X Entertainment after the band sent them an unsolicited, self-produced demo tape.

'Shy', a track off their eponymous first album, was featured on an early 'Buffy the Vampire Slayer' episode, entitled 'Halloween'. Their second album Sophomore Slump introduced the song "You're So 1988", which was featured in the film The Tao of Steve.

== Band members ==
- R. David Bynum – bass
- Matthew Nader – guitar, vocals
- David Terry – vocals, guitar
- John Truskett – drums, percussion

== Discography ==
- Epperley (1996)
- Sophomore Slump (1998)
