= Epperley (album) =

Studio album by Epperley
- Released: February 13, 1996
- Recorded: Long Branch Studio
- Genre: alternative, post-grunge
- Label: Triple X Entertainment
- Producer: Epperley

Epperley chronology
Epperley (1996)	Sophomore Slump (1998)

Professional ratings
Review scores
Source	Rating
AllMusic	3/5 stars

Epperley is the eponymous debut studio album by the Oklahoma band Epperley. The song "Shy" was featured in Season 2, Episode 6 of Buffy the Vampire Slayer.

== Track listing ==
All songs and lyrics by Epperley.

1. "Nice Guy Eddie" – 4:55
2. "Golden Shower" – 3:51
3. "If" – 2:44
4. "Ride Away" – 3:32
5. "Pulse" – 2:57
6. "Wait" – 5:03
7. "Motivator" – 4:10
8. "Buzz On" – 3:21
9. "Love Day" – 2:56
10. "Shy" – 4:47
11. "Its Universal" – 3:52
12. "Disillusioned Jesus" – 6:21

== Personnel ==
- R. David Bynum – bass
- Matthew Nader – guitar, vocals
- David Terry – vocals, guitar
- John Truskett – drums, percussion

=== Additional personnel ===
- Ed Robinson – engineer
- Kevin Gray -mastering
- David Taylor – cover art
- William H. Dittman -band photos
