= Jenniphr Goodman =

American film director

Jenniphr Goodman is a film director best known for directing and co-writing the 2000 film The Tao of Steve.

She received her B.A. in creative writing and film making in 1984 through Pitzer College. After graduation, Goodman returned to her hometown in Cleveland, Ohio to teach art to preschool children. She is also a graduate of New York University's film school at the Tisch School of the Arts. Goodman resided in Santa Fe with her husband Eric Pope, and their two daughters.

Goodman was a mentor at the Girls Film School in Santa Fe for several years, a program designed to empower young women in the film industry. She has co-written and directed several short films, including A September to Remember about the wake of 9/11. Goodman was the executive producer of the documentary GSW: Gunshot Wound, looking at gun violence through the perspective of first responders and hospital-based violence intervention programs.
