= 11 Transistor =

Studio album by Lazlo Bane
- Released: January 28, 1997
- Recorded: 1995–1996
- Studios: Cheswick Studio, Los Angeles, California
- Genres: Alternative rock, indie rock
- Length: 45:12
- Label: Almo Sounds
- Producer: Chad Fischer

Lazlo Bane chronology
Short Style (1996)	11 Transistor (1997)	All the Time in the World (2002)

Singles from 11 Transistor
- 1. "Buttercup" Released: 1996; 2. "Overkill" Released: 1997

Professional ratings
Review scores
Source	Rating
Allmusic	3/5 stars
babysue	4/6 stars

11 Transistor is the debut album by the American band Lazlo Bane, which was released on the Almo Sounds label in early 1997.

== Overview ==
According to Lazlo Bane's frontman Chad Fischer most of the record was done on 16 tracks with very few effects with all the songwriting done on an acoustic guitar into a little dictaphone. He also said that the idea was to work with as little as possible and make it sound the best it could, just like old transistor radios.

The album was recorded through 1995 and 1996 with the input from various musicians to the songwriting and recording. They include Chad Fischer's fellow School of Fish band members Josh Clayton-Felt and Josh Freese, Wire Train's Kevin Hunter and Anders Rundblad, Lyle Workman of the Bourgeois Tagg and the most notable being Colin Hay who provides guitar and vocals for Lazlo Bane's version of Men at Work's "Overkill".

11 Transistor features all the songs from the band's previous release, Short Style EP.

== Release and promotion ==
Lazlo Bane was initially signed to an indie label Fish of Death Records and released the song "Buttercup" as a single on vinyl backed with "Overkill".

After signing with Almo Sounds "Buttercup" was included on various promo compilations, including 1996 album titled Swagalicious, which was compiled of the tracks from artists signed to Almo Sounds, Geffen Records, DreamWorks Records and Outpost Recordings. "Overkill" was shifted to the A-side and released as single in some territories in 1997 and 1998, while "I'll Do Everything" was released as promo single in 1997.

Music video for "Overkill" featuring Colin Hay was also released.

The band went on tour in support of the album later in 1997.

Originally released on CD and cassette the album was unavailable digitally until 2020 when it was made available on streaming services and in digital download format. In support of the digital reissue Chad Fischer released a video of the new solo version of the album's opening track "I'll Do Everything".

== Reception ==
The album received positive reviews upon release with critics praising the songs "I'll Do Everything" and "Overkill" the most.

Before the release of the album "I'll Do Everything" was named the Song of the Month by Los Angeles' radio KROQ-FM.

In the review for the Miami New Times, Steven Almond described the album having "great hooks, slinky beats, quirky lyrics" noting, that "the band's playful spirit is best captured on the exuberant opener "I'll Do Everything"". He also called the ballads "dependably entrancing, built around Fischer's mournful melodies and spiced with just enough rhythmic muscle to keep the proceedings from turning maudlin".

Sandra Schulman of the Sun-Sentinel described the album as having "crafting hooky, melodic, slightly quirky pop songs" and also said that "many of these tracks have a rough edge".

Daily Herald's Adam Webb Teen called the album a "stunning debut" and said that Chad Fischer "combines crafty, peppy pop riffs with his mellowing rough-around-the-edges voice. It's a voice that fits perfectly with each song".

In the review for the Lollipop Magazine Sheril Stanford said that "11 Transistor is 99 and 44/100ths percent pure good times" and called a cover of Men at Work's "Overkill" "a truly outstanding track".

On-line magazine babysue rated the album 4 out of 6 stars and described the music as "lush and full of great vocal harmonies" with the songs being "truly catchy tunes" noting "standaout tracks: "Flea Market Girl," "Buttercup," "Sleep," and "Overkill".

A review at ocolly.com described the album as "The quasi-Beatles sound [that] comes together beautifully".

DeadJournalist of the tsururadio.com called "Overkill" "One of my favorite cover songs of all-time".

== Track listing ==
No.	Title	Writer(s)	Length
1.	"I'll Do Everything"	Chad Fischer / Jon Simon	3:21
2.	"Wax Down Wings"	Fischer	4:05
3.	"Flea Market Girl"	Fischer / Kevin Hunter	3:56
4.	"Buttercup"	Fischer / Lyle Workman	3:44
5.	"1975"	Fischer	2:50
6.	"View From The Pavement"	Fischer / Workman	4:26
7.	"Sleep"	Fischer	4:52
8.	"Novakane"	Fischer	2:37
9.	"Last Black Jelly Bean"	Fischer	2:12
10.	"Overkill" (feat. Colin Hay)	Colin Hay	4:14
11.	"Midday Train"	Fischer / Anders Rundblad	3:55
69.	"Prada Wallet" (hidden track)	Fischer / Josh Clayton-Felt / Hunter	1:12

Bonus track on the Japanese edition
No.	Title	Writer(s)	Length
70.	"Mean Mr. Mustard" (The Beatles cover, hidden track)	John Lennon / Paul McCartney	2:24

- On original 11 Transistor US CD after "Midday Train" tracks 12 to 68 are silent and lasting 4 seconds each, making "Prada Wallet" 69th track overall, which starts after 3:48 of silence. The cassette edition simply had 3:48 of silence after "Midday Train".

== Personnel ==
- Lazlo Bane – primary artist
- Jon Simon – guitar and bass on "I'll Do Everything"
- Kevin Hunter – guitar and bass on "Flea Market Girl"
- Princess Fresse – drums on "Buttercup" and "Prada Wallet"
- Lyle Workman – guitar and bass on "Buttercup" and "View From The Pavement"
- Colin Hay – guitar and vocals on "Overkill"
- David Dale – guitar on "Overkill"
- Dave Collins – mastering
- Tony Phillips – mixing
- Chad Fischer – engineer
- Jeff Robinson – assistant engineer

=== Additional personnel ===
- Jill Berliner – legal
- Keryn Kaplan – management
- Paul McGuinness – management
- Paul Kremen – artist & repertoire
- Mary Lynne Barbis – art direction, design
- Patrick Raske – art direction, design
- Mary Kocol – photography
- William Howard – photography
- Lauren Lambert – photography
- Molly Amanda Rubin – photography
