= Guilty Pleasures the 80's Volume 1 =

EP by Lazlo Bane
- Released: October 16, 2012
- Genre: Alternative rock, pop, new wave
- Length: 25:30
- Label: Lookout Sound

Lazlo Bane chronology
Guilty Pleasures (2007)	Guilty Pleasures the 80's Volume 1 (2012)	Someday We'll Be Together (2021)

Guilty Pleasures the 80's [sic] Volume 1 is the second EP by the band Lazlo Bane. It is the follow-up record to the band's previous album of cover versions of songs from the 1970s Guilty Pleasures; consisting of covers of songs originally released in the 1980s.

== Overview ==
For this EP Lazlo Bane chose less charted songs than for the previous covers instalment. Most of the songs on Guilty Pleasures were Top 10 hits in the Billboard Hot 100 US music chart, while only three songs covered on Guilty Pleasures the 80's originally entered the Top 10. The song "Sherlock Holmes", originally by Sparks, hadn't been released as a single at all.

Lyle Workman, the guitarist for Bourgeois Tagg and co-writer of the song "I Don't Mind At All", has previously collaborated with Lazlo Bane on their first album 11 Transistor.

It is unknown whether Volume 2 will follow soon, but CD Baby solicits requests for songs' selections.

== Uses in other media ==
The songs "Take On Me" and "Hold Me Now" have been featured in the Private Practice television series' Season Four episode "Short Cuts" and last season's episode "You Don't Know What You've Got Till It's Gone", which originally aired on September 30, 2010 and October 23, 2012 respectively.

== Track listing ==
No.	Title	Writer(s)	Original Artist	Length
1.	"Space Age Love Song"	Mike Score, Paul Reynolds, Frank Maudsley and Ali Score	A Flock of Seagulls	4:14
2.	"Hold Me Now"	Tom Bailey, Alannah Currie and Joe Leeway	Thompson Twins	4:53
3.	"Take On Me"	Magne Furuholmen, Morten Harket and Pål Waaktaar	A-ha	4:46
4.	"Don't Change"	Garry Gary Beers, Andrew Farriss, Jon Farriss, Tim Farriss, Michael Hutchence and Kirk Pengilly	INXS	4:18
5.	"Sherlock Holmes"	Ron Mael and Russell Mael	Sparks	3:39
6.	"Electric Avenue"	Eddy Grant	Eddy Grant	3:28
7.	"I Don't Mind At All"	Brent Bourgeois and Lyle Workman	Bourgeois Tagg	2:36
Total length:				25:30
