= Nil Lara =

American singer

- Born: 1964 (age 61–62); Newark, New Jersey, US
- Origin: Miami, Florida
- Genres: Rock, blues, country, son cubano
- Occupation: Musician
- Instruments: Singing, guitar, tres, cuatro
- Labels: Metro Blue/Capitol, Beluga Blue
- Formerly of: K.R.U.

Nil Lara (born 1964) is an American musician from Miami, Florida who is a singer, guitarist and songwriter, playing the tres, the six-stringed Cuban guitar, and the cuatro, a Venezuelan guitar.

== Biography ==
Lara was born in Newark, New Jersey, the son of Cuban immigrants, but much of his childhood was spent in Venezuela, moving to Caracas at the age of 7. At 8, he had mastered cuatro - a four-string Venezuelan instrument from which he graduated to the guitar. He moved with his family to Miami when he was in junior high. While studying electrical engineering at the University of Miami in Florida, he rediscovered his Cuban roots in guajiro, the Cuban equivalent of country, and "Son" - Cuban music's answer to the blues. This led him to the tres, a Cuban instrument with a unique sound and with the status of a grassroots instrument in Cuba.

== Career ==
Lara's music is based on Cuban and Venezuelan folklore, with inspiration from Western musicians like Stevie Wonder and Pink Floyd. He formed a group called K.R.U. while at the University of Miami, with whom he released two albums before they disbanded, after which he became a teacher at New World School of the Arts.

In December 1993 Lara released My First Child with his new band, Beluga Blue. He signed to Metro Blue/Capitol Records in 1995, releasing Nil Lara in 1996, produced by Susan Rodgers. He wrote little new material for the next few years, finally releasing Testimony and Da in 2004.

=== Live performances ===
Lara has been touring since 1995, from small acoustic performances to arenas. He has toured with Lenny Kravitz, Blues Traveler, Natalie Merchant and many others. In June and July 1996, Lara toured many festivals in Europe. In August 1996, Lara toured Belgium, the Netherlands, Luxembourg, England, Japan, and Spain. His 1999 summer tour covered 15 cities in the Southeastern USA. He often performs in the Miami area.

=== Television soundtracks ===
Lara's songs have appeared in television shows such as Scrubs ("Fighting for My Love"), Melrose Place ("Fighting for My Love"), Mad About You ("My First Child"), and Cold Case ("Vida mas simple").

== Discography ==
=== Albums ===
- Smile EP (1991)
- My First Child 7-Song EP (1993)
- The Monkey 3-Song EP (1994)
- Nil Lara (1996)
- Testimony (2004)
- DA (2004)

=== DVD ===
- Nil Lara - LIVE @ Sessions at W. 54th Street
