= Big Spill =

Studio album by The Rage
- Released: April 23, 2013
- Genres: Hard rock, rock and roll
- Length: 32:40
- Label: Lookout Mountain

Big Spill is a debut studio album by American hard rock band The Rage, alter ego of the American alternative rock band Lazlo Bane.

== Overview ==
The Rage project was originally started sometime in 2006 as The (Silent) Rage with four songs ("Switch Hitter", "Dirty Old Man", "Big Spill" and "Take No Prisoners") available to listen on the band's Myspace page.

Several music videos were directed by Randy Link in support of the band, including the previously unavailable song "Black Fly".

Since then the band was featured in the 2008 film The Rocker, where another song from the future album, "Tailgate", was briefly played. The film also featured a re-recording of the song "Dirty Old Man" with new lyrics, retitled "Pompeii Nights". The film's soundtrack album was also released and included "Pompeii Nights" and an excerpt of the song "Take No Prisoners".

Between 2009 and 2012 no new releases by The Rage were made, until the release of Big Spill in 2013. The album features previously known band's songs with the addition of new ones, and follows mostly hard rock style except for "One Mistake", the gentle piano song, and "Black Fly", which is a dance influenced track.

== Use in other media ==
The title track was featured in Bruce Leddy's 2006 film Shut Up & Sing also known as The Wedding Weekend.

The song "Tailgate" was used in the 2008 film The Rocker.

== Track listing ==
1. "Switch Hitter" - 2:50
2. "Dirty Old Man" - 2:32
3. "Big Spill" - 2:06
4. "Tailgate" - 2:22
5. "Gamblin' Man" - 2:07
6. "Rock and Roll" - 3:40
7. "Take No Prisoners" - 2:02
8. "Out of Control" - 2:03
9. "One Mistake" - 2:52
10. "King of Scum" - 4:17
11. "Black Nanny Malone" - 2:47
12. "Black Fly" - 3:02
