= The Tao of Steve =

2000 American romantic comedy film

- Theatrical release poster
- Directed by: Jenniphr Goodman
- Written by: Duncan North; Greer Goodman; Jenniphr Goodman
- Produced by: Anthony Bregman
- Starring: Donal Logue; Greer Goodman; Kimo Willis; Ayelet Kaznelson; David Aaron Baker; Nina Jaroslaw
- Music by: Joe Delia
- Production company: Good Machine
- Distributed by: Sony Pictures Classics
- Release date: January 26, 2000 (Sundance Film Festival)
- Running time: 87 min
- Language: English

The Tao of Steve is a 2000 American romantic comedy film written by Duncan North, Greer Goodman, and Jenniphr Goodman, directed by Jenniphr Goodman, and starring Donal Logue and Greer Goodman.

The film was produced by Ted Hope and James Schamus' Good Machine production company and released through Sony Pictures Classics. Logue won the 2000 Sundance Film Festival's Special Jury Prize for outstanding performance in a dramatic film and the film itself was nominated for the Grand Jury Prize. It was filmed in and around Santa Fe, New Mexico, where the story is set. Although the script never mentions St. John's College, the film includes many visual and verbal references to the seminar-based Great Books program taught there.

== Plot ==
Dex is an unlikely Lothario - an overweight, thirty-something part-time kindergarten teacher - who has developed an effective method for seducing women. "The Tao of Steve", Dex's own personal pseudophilosophy on seduction, combines a Taoist outlook with the qualities embodied by TV characters such as Steve Austin (The Six Million Dollar Man) and Steve McGarrett (Hawaii Five-O) and, above all, by the actor Steve McQueen. He meets up with Syd, an old college conquest whom he can't remember, but to whom he is instantly attracted. However, she never forgot him, and is hurt that he got over her so easily. Slowly, Dex subjects Syd to the "Tao of Steve", but Syd is immune to Dex's charms. Gradually, he develops genuine feelings for her.

During a camping trip with Syd, Dex suffers chest pains and has to be taken to the hospital. A doctor informs Dex that what he thought was a heart attack was merely heartburn, but cautions him that his lifestyle is endangering his health. Later, at school, the husband of one of his conquests punches him in the face in front of his students. Syd comes to Dex's house to console him, and they end up sleeping together. The next day, however, she finds out about his "philosophy", and leaves in disgust. Dex finally realizes that he needs to make changes in his life.

Sometime later, Syd is in New York City, working as a set designer. She leaves a message on Dex's answering machine asking him to call her and talk about their relationship - only to see Dex himself standing before her, ready to give them a chance.

== Cast ==
- Donal Logue as Dex
- Greer Goodman as Syd
- David Aaron Baker as Rick
- James 'Kimo' Wills as Dave
- Nina Jaroslaw as Maggie
- Ayelet Kaznelson as Beth

== Production ==
Director Jenniphr Goodman, after finishing her studies at New York University's film school, returned with her husband to her childhood hometown of Santa Fe, where they shared a house with North, a friend from college. Much like his fictional counterpart, North was an overweight kindergarten teacher who nevertheless managed to sleep around, including with two of Goodman's own friends.

Out of work, Goodman began to have long conversations with North over the next two years, fascinated by his success and philosophy. This led to her wanting to make a film about North, either a documentary or some sort of one-man show. When her sister Greer became involved in 1996, they developed the project into a narrative film.

The Goodman sisters and North spent the next two years writing multiple drafts of the script as it evolved from a personal odyssey story into a romantic comedy. Pre-production began in New Mexico, and Jenniphr hired another NYU alumn, Teo Maniaci, as the cinematographer. Unfortunately, the start date for filming had to be pushed back when the actor they wanted for the lead turned out to be unavailable. During this time, Maniaci had given the script to Anthony Bregman, with whom he had just worked on a film that was made for Bregman's employer, Good Machine.

The delay was fortuitous, as Bregman and Good Machine came aboard as producers. The script went through 10 more drafts that year with Bregman, who comments, "That's one of the luxuries about independent film, you often have time to make the script perfect. You're always waiting for something — an actor's schedule to free up, more money to appear — so you have lots of time to reschedule, re-budget, and rewrite."

The actor in question was Donal Logue, who had been off making what would be John Frankenheimer's final film, Reindeer Games. Shooting began on July 7, 1999.

== Music ==
Joe Delia wrote the film's score. Eytan Mirsky wrote the title track "The Tao of Steve (Isn't It Time?)," as well as another song in the film, "(I Just Wanna Be) Your Steve McQueen." Donal Logue wrote and performs three songs in the film.

The Tao Of Steve: Original Motion Picture Soundtrack was released by Milan Records in 2000, and featured the following songs:

1. Eytan Mirsky — "The Tao Of Steve (Isn't It Time?)"
2. Joe Delia — "Opening Titles"
3. Epperley — "Nice Guy Eddie"
4. Donal Logue — "Be Desireless"
5. Lazlo Bane — "Superman"
6. Joe Delia — "Love Theme"
7. Adventures in Stereo — "Down In The Traffic"
8. Donal Logue — "Be Excellent"
9. The Ventures — "Hawaii Five-O Theme"
10. Stereo Total — "Movie Star"
11. Oliver Nelson — "The Six Million Dollar Man Theme"
12. Eytan Mirsky — "(I Just Wanna Be) Your Steve McQueen"
13. Joe Delia — "Lesson Theme"
14. The Lemonheads — "The Outdoor Type"
15. Donal Logue — "Be Gone"
16. The Marathons — "Peanut Butter"
17. Epperley — "You're So 1988"
18. The Blue Hawaiians — "Martini Five-O"

== Reception ==
The film enjoyed mostly positive reviews. On the review aggregator website Rotten Tomatoes, 80% of 49 critics' reviews are positive, with an average rating of 6.8/10. Metacritic, which uses a weighted average, assigned the film a score of 70 out of 100, based on 30 critics, indicating "generally favorable" reviews.

Roger Ebert called it "...an easygoing but bright comedy that focuses on Logue's effortless charm (he won the best actor award at Sundance). It creates the feeling of settling in comfortably with old friends... One of the things I like about the movie is the wit of its dialogue, the way sentences and conversations coil with confidence up to a conclusion that is totally unexpected."

David Edelstein of Slate.com also praised the dialogue: "[The Tao of Steve] has some of the funniest romantic banter in a movie in years..." He says the film "...went down like a slice of warm pecan pie topped with two scoops of Ben & Jerry's Bovinity Divinity."

In reaction to the film's philosophical undertone, Peter Travers of Rolling Stone wrote that "it's pure pleasure" to watch a romantic comedy "with enough verbal smarts to coax laughs out of Lao Tzu, Heidegger, Kierkegaard and Mozart’s Don Giovanni."
