= Lazlo Bane =

American alternative rock band

- Origin: Santa Monica, California, U.S.
- Genres: Alternative rock; power pop; post-grunge
- Years active: 1995–present
- Labels: Fish of Death; Almo Sounds; Lookout Sound; Hollywood
- Members: Chad Fischer; Chris Link; Tim Bright; Robert "Chicken" Burke
- Website: www.lazlobaneofficial.com

Lazlo Bane is an American alternative rock band from Santa Monica, California, United States. They are well known for collaborating with former Men at Work member Colin Hay, and providing the song "Superman" as the theme for the television show Scrubs.

== Background ==
=== Formation and early years ===
The band's origin can be traced back to the efforts of Chad Fischer touring with School of Fish in the early 1990s as a drummer. After a disagreement and falling out with a producer and School of Fish eventual split, Fischer went solo and began writing and recording his material without the benefit of professional mixing or mastering.

Taking the name Lazlo Bane Chad Fischer initially signed to Los Angeles-based indie label Fish of Death Records, and released debut single "Buttercup" backed with a cover of Men at Work's 1983 hit "Overkill". The latter was recorded in conjunction with Men at Work's frontman Colin Hay, with whom Chad Fischer formed a solid relationship and would continue to collaborate in the studio and live to this day.

In 1996, Fischer resigned to a bigger label Almo Sounds, recruiting bass player Chris Link, guitarist Tim Bright, and a drummer nicknamed Chicken to form a band and to share the effort and workload. In August 1996, Lazlo Bane produced an EP Short Style, composed of five tracks, and on January 28, 1997, the band released their first full-length album, 11 Transistor, featuring Fischer originals as well as their proved to be popular cover of "Overkill". The song was released as a single by Almo Sounds and was accompanied by a music video directed by Mark Miremont (again featuring Colin Hay), which eventually reached MTV2's Top 10 of the Year list for 1997.

After the release of the debut album, Lazlo Bane went on tour in the US with Los Angeles band Chalk FarM, particularly participating in the WAXY-FM radio's music festival Buzz Bake Sale in November 1997.

=== All the Time in the World, side projects and Back Sides ===
In the late 1990s, Lazlo Bane began work on the follow-up to 11 Transistor but eventually had to continue without assistance from a major recording label since the band was dropped from Almo after it was bought by Universal Music Group in early 2000. Chad Fischer also self-established the recording studio Lookout Sound, where the work on the Lazlo Bane's second album continued.

The first new release by the band was the song "Superman" which appeared on the soundtrack album to The Tao of Steve in 2000. It soon became the band's most recognizable song because of its use in the hit TV comedy series Scrubs. Series star Zach Braff, who has selective input on songs chosen for the show's soundtrack, was immediately struck by the song, and wanted to use it as the recurring theme song. The band initially was reluctant and declined Braff's request. After a short while, they changed their minds, and Braff and Fischer worked out an arrangement.

The band's second album, All the Time in the World, finally came out in September 2002 as a self-release. The album expanded the arrangements with additional instruments and effects — such as violin, saxophone, and piano — in comparison to their debut album.

Around the same time, Lazlo Bane members started various additional projects. Tim Bright found techno-rock band Samsara, Chris Link joined hard rock supergroup GIVE, Chicken joined George Clinton led Drugs, while Chad Fischer moved to production and film scoring. Lazlo Bane still stayed together as a band and continued releases with a new composition "Sleepless In Brooklyn", that was featured in 2005 film Little Manhattan for which Chad Fischer composed the score as well as several original songs by himself. However, the soundtrack for the film haven't been commercially released and the song "Sleepless In Brooklyn" remains unavailable. Another song from the film, "Map Of My Heart", written and performed solely by Chad Fischer, would be later played live by the band.

Back Sides followed in 2006 and featured tracks that at some point were considered for inclusion in All the Time In the World, but had been dropped and later refined. Back Sides represents the paradigm shift in music marketing as it is a "virtual album", available primarily through online sales outlets instead of traditional, physical retailers.

=== Guilty Pleasures, work outside Lazlo Bane and Guilty Pleasures the 80s ===
In the beginning of 2007, Lazlo Bane started work on a new album of 1970s covers named Guilty Pleasures, which was released on July 10, 2007. In the summer of 2007, Lazlo Bane began touring in support of Guilty Pleasures, opening for Colin Hay on several dates. This was the band's first official tour in ten years.

During the summer tour, Lazlo Bane performed a new original song, "Myspace Page". The next album that should have consisted of original material was in the plans but was postponed due to some work of members of the band outside Lazlo Bane. During that time, Chad Fischer and Tim Bright were scoring the ABC series Private Practice. Fischer also produced the soundtrack and scored the film The Rocker, released in 2008. Several songs for the film were recorded with the participation of Lazlo Bane band members. Chicken worked on music for the 2008 film Paris, directed by Cédric Klapisch and later formed the band The Duke & The King with Simone Felice of the Felice Brothers. By the end of 2009, the only new Lazlo Bane song "Myspace Page" was put on the band's Myspace page and the new album was shelved for an undefined period.

Since 2009, the band has made a few appearances with new covers. They covered Spandau Ballet's song "True" from their album of the same name for the 2009 film I Love You, Beth Cooper, but it was left off the film's official soundtrack.

Another 1980s cover, A-ha's "Take On Me", has been featured in ABC's TV show Private Practice, in the episode "Short Cuts", which originally aired on September 30, 2010.

On October 16, 2012, the band released a follow-up EP to their album Guilty Pleasures titled Guilty Pleasures the 80's Volume 1. It featured "Take On Me" among the tracks, but Lazlo Bane's cover of "True" was left off again.

=== Hiatus, albums reissues, reunion and Someday We'll Be Together ===
Since 2013, the band showed no new activity until the end of 2018, when the vinyl reissue of the All the Time in the World took place.

In 2020, the band reunited for the release of the new version of the song "Superman" as a video. The digital reissue of the Lazlo Bane's debut album 11 Transistor followed in summer, while the video for the new version of "1975" followed in November 2020.

In 2021, Lazlo Bane continued with the video releases: the new version of "Trampoline" and the cover of World Party's "Ship of Fools" came out in March 2021 and August 2021 respectively.

On 29 October 2021, a video for David Bowie's "Life on Mars" was released with the announcement of the new Lazlo Bane album Someday We'll Be Together. The album followed on the next day through streaming platforms. Someday We'll Be Together featured the band's previous video only recordings along with songs Chad Fischer previously released as solo videos.

=== Return to touring and UltraViolet ===
During the appearance in the Dig Me Out podcast in April 2022, Chad Fischer expressed the desire to release new original music by Lazlo Bane.

In December 2022, Lazlo Bane released a holiday-themed video for the song "Thanks for Christmas".

In early 2023, the band announced that they will be opening for Colin Hay's US West Coast tour. The 14-date tour took place in April 2023.

On March 20, 2023 Lazlo Bane released a new single and music video for the original song "Like a Flower"

Lazlo Bane continued touring in 2024 with two short tours traking place in spring and fall.

In early 2026 Lazlo Bane announced a new project, UltraViolet: an animated short film, graphic novel and soundtrack album. The album was released on March 23, 2026.

== Name ==
Lazlo Bane is named after the main character of Rachel Andrews' experimental novel Theme Park Roadkill.

== The (Silent) Rage ==
The (Silent) Rage (T(S)R) is Lazlo Bane's alter ego side project which is stylistically similar to AC/DC. For the project the members of Lazlo Bane switched instruments and took pseudonyms: Dino (Chicken) - vocals, Fuzzy (Tim Bright) - bass, Licks (Chad Fischer) - drums, and Stixx (Chris Link) - guitar.

The band's Myspace page was added in 2006 with four songs available to listen: "Dirty Old Man", "Switch Hitter", "Big Spill" and "Take No Prisoners". Another song titled "Black Fly" was made available as a music video on YouTube in 2007. This song is a dance-influenced track, which is a departure from the hard rock style of T(S)R.

In 2008 The (Silent) Rage was featured in the film The Rocker, starring Rainn Wilson and Teddy Geiger. The songs "Promised Land" and "Pompeii Nights" attributed to the fictional band Vesuvius were written and performed by the members of The (Silent) Rage, with lead vocals sung by Keith England. "Pompeii Nights" is a re-recording of the song "Dirty Old Man" with different lyrics. Another new song featured in the film called "Tailgate" was solely performed by T(S)R. The songs "Promised Land" and "Pompeii Nights" were released on the film's official soundtrack.

The year 2013 finally saw the release of the band's first studio album, Big Spill. However, the word "Silent" was omitted from the band's name making it simply The Rage.

== Discography ==
=== Studio albums ===
Year	Album details
1997	11 Transistor: Released: January 28, 1997; Label: Almo Sounds
2002	All the Time in the World: Released: September 27, 2002; Label: Self-released
2006	Back Sides: Released: April 11, 2006; Label: Self-released
2007	Guilty Pleasures: Released: July 10, 2007; Label: Lookout Sound
2013	Big Spill (The Rage): Released: April 23, 2013; Label: Lookout Mountain
2021	Someday We'll Be Together (Lazlo Bane & Friends): Released: October 30, 2021; Label: Self-released
2026	UltraViolet: Released: March 20, 2026; Label: Self-released

=== Extended plays ===
Year	Album details
1996	Short Style: Released: August 20, 1996; Label: Almo Sounds
2012	Guilty Pleasures the 80's Volume 1: Released: October 16, 2012; Label: Lookout Sound

=== Singles ===
Year	Single	Album
1996	"Buttercup"	11 Transistor
1997	"Overkill"	11 Transistor
2023	"Like a Flower"	UltraViolet

Promotional singles

Year	Single	Album
1997	"I'll Do Everything"	11 Transistor
2002	"Superman"	All the Time in the World

=== Compilation appearances ===
Year	Song	Album	Comment
2000	"Superman"	The Tao of Steve: Original Motion Picture Soundtrack	
2002	"Superman"	Music from [Scrubs]	
2008	"Mama Told Me Not to Come"	Bonneville: Original Motion Picture Soundtrack	
2008	"Promised Land"	The Rocker: Music from the Motion Picture	Songs credited to Vesuvius are performed by Lazlo Bane's alter ego The (Silent) Rage featuring Keith England on lead vocals
2008	"Pompeii Nights"	The Rocker: Music from the Motion Picture	Songs credited to Vesuvius are performed by Lazlo Bane's alter ego The (Silent) Rage featuring Keith England on lead vocals
2014	"Stuck in the Middle with You"	Let's Be Cops: Original Motion Picture Soundtrack	

=== Other recorded songs ===
List of songs recorded by Lazlo Bane, but not featured on music releases
Title	Year	Comment
"Sleepless in Brooklyn"	2005	The song was featured in the film Little Manhattan
"Myspace Page"	2006	The song was available to listen on the band's Myspace page
"True"	2009	The song was featured in the film I Love You, Beth Cooper
"Thanks for Christmas"	2022	The song was released as a music video

== Music videos ==
Year	Song	Director(s)	Album
1997	"Overkill"	Mark Miremont	11 Transistor
2002	"Superman"	Zach Braff	All the Time in the World
2006	"Peace Is Our Profession"		Back Sides
2007	"Big Spill"^{[A]}	Randy Link	Big Spill
2007	"Dirty Old Man"^{[A]}	Randy Link	Big Spill
2007	"Black Fly"^{[A]}	Randy Link	Big Spill
2007	"I'm Not in Love"	Heather Seybolt	Guilty Pleasures
2020	"Superman"^{[B]}	Chad Fischer	Someday We'll Be Together
2020	"1975"^{[B]}	Chad Fischer	Someday We'll Be Together
2021	"Trampoline"^{[B]}	Chad Fischer	Someday We'll Be Together
2021	"Ship of Fools"	Chad Fischer	Someday We'll Be Together
2021	"Life on Mars"	Chad Fischer	Someday We'll Be Together
2022	"Thanks for Christmas"	Chad Fischer	N/A
2023	"Like a Flower"	Chad Fischer	UltraViolet

Notes

- A "Big Spill", "Dirty Old Man" and "Black Fly" are songs by Lazlo Bane's alter ego The (Silent) Rage.
- B "Superman", "1975" and "Trampoline" from the album Someday We'll Be Together are re-recorded versions of the songs from the band's earlier releases.

=== Third party music videos ===
Year	Song	Director(s)	Album
2008	"Superman"	Clay Cow Productions	All the Time in the World
	"Lonely Boy"	Clay Cow Productions	Guilty Pleasures
2011	"Alone Again"	Clay Cow Productions	Guilty Pleasures
	"Scene of the Crime"	Clay Cow Productions	All the Time in the World
2023	"Like a Flower"	Alvaro Ortega	UltraViolet
