= Superman (Lazlo Bane song) =

Song by Lazlo Bane

from the album All the Time in the World and The Tao of Steve: Original Motion Picture Soundtrack
- Released: May 22, 2000
- Recorded: Lookout Sound, Los Angeles, California
- Length: 3:43 (Album version); 3:38 (Soundtrack version); 3:32 (Single version)
- Label: Hollywood
- Songwriters: Chad Fischer; Chris Link; Tim Bright
- Producer: Chad Fischer

Music video
- "Superman" on YouTube

"Superman" (also sometimes titled as "I'm No Superman") is a song by American alternative rock band Lazlo Bane from their album All the Time in the World. It is most noted for being the theme song to the American TV series Scrubs.

== Background and release ==
"Superman" was first released on the soundtrack album for the film The Tao of Steve in 2000, a year prior to its first appearance in Scrubs, though it was not featured in the film itself.

Zach Braff, the star of Scrubs, was impressed by the song and suggested the use of the song as the theme to executive producer Bill Lawrence. "Superman" by Lazlo Bane served as a theme song for eight seasons of Scrubs.

Scrubs proved to be successful, and "Superman" was later issued on the first show soundtrack and as a promotional single. Around the same time, in September 2002, the song was released on Lazlo Bane's second studio album All the Time in the World.

In 2020 the band reunited to record a video for the new version of the song featuring many guest appearances of fellow musicians and friends, including Scrubs cast members Zach Braff and Neil Flynn. The song was later included on the Lazlo Bane 2021 album Someday We'll Be Together.

In 2026, Scrubs returned with a new season and original version of "Superman" was again used as a theme song.

=== Versions and structure ===
The soundtrack version of "Superman", both Scrubs' and The Tao of Steve, has duration 3:38 and omits the intro count-in which is present on the album All the Time in the World, making the duration of the latter 3:43.

The single version of the song also doesn't have the count-in, but it is 5 seconds shorter than the soundtrack version due to slightly faster speed.

The last episode of the eighth season of Scrubs, "My Finale", features a portion of the acoustic instrumental version of "Superman".

"Superman" samples the drum track of "Impeach the President" by '70s soul group The Honey Drippers.

== Music video ==
Zach Braff directed the song's music video. It shows behind-the-scenes footage from the Scrubs set and features several of the show's cast members, including Zach Braff, Sarah Chalke and Ken Jenkins. The video was filmed at the abandoned North Hollywood Medical Center, which doubles as the show's location Sacred Heart Hospital.

A small video productions company, Clay Cow Productions, made their own music video for the song, which was praised by Chad Fischer. The video illustrates the lyrics of the song with plasticine characters and set.

== Reception ==
Chad Fischer, Tim Bright and Chris Link as composers of "Superman" along with Scrubs composer Jan Stevens won BMI TV Music Award of 2003 and 2004 for the show's theme song and music.

"Superman" was ranked No. 2 at the 2004 Just Plain Folks Music Awards in the category College Rock Song.

In 2014 Mashable included the song in their list of 25 iconic TV theme songs of all time.

In 2016 New York Observer ranked the song No. 27 in their list of The 30 Best TV Theme Songs of All Time.

In 2017 Paste magazine ranked the song No. 38 in their list of The 50 Best TV Theme Songs of All Time.

In 2023 American Songwriter magazine ranked the song No. 2 in their list of The Top 10 TV Theme Songs from the 2000s and 2010s.

== Cover versions ==
The song was covered by The Blanks, who portrayed members of Ted Buckland's band, The Worthless Peons, on Scrubs, and was released as the opening track of the band's debut album Riding the Wave in 2004. Their version was also featured as the outro to the final episode of Scrubs season 8, "My Finale", during the run of the blooper reel.

"Superman" was also covered by American singer-songwriter WAZ and released as a digital download single in 2009. This version was used as a theme song for the ninth season of Scrubs.

In 2020 Jack Muskrat released a rock cover of the song accompanied by the music video.
