= Larry Goldings =

American jazz pianist, organist, and composer (born 1968)

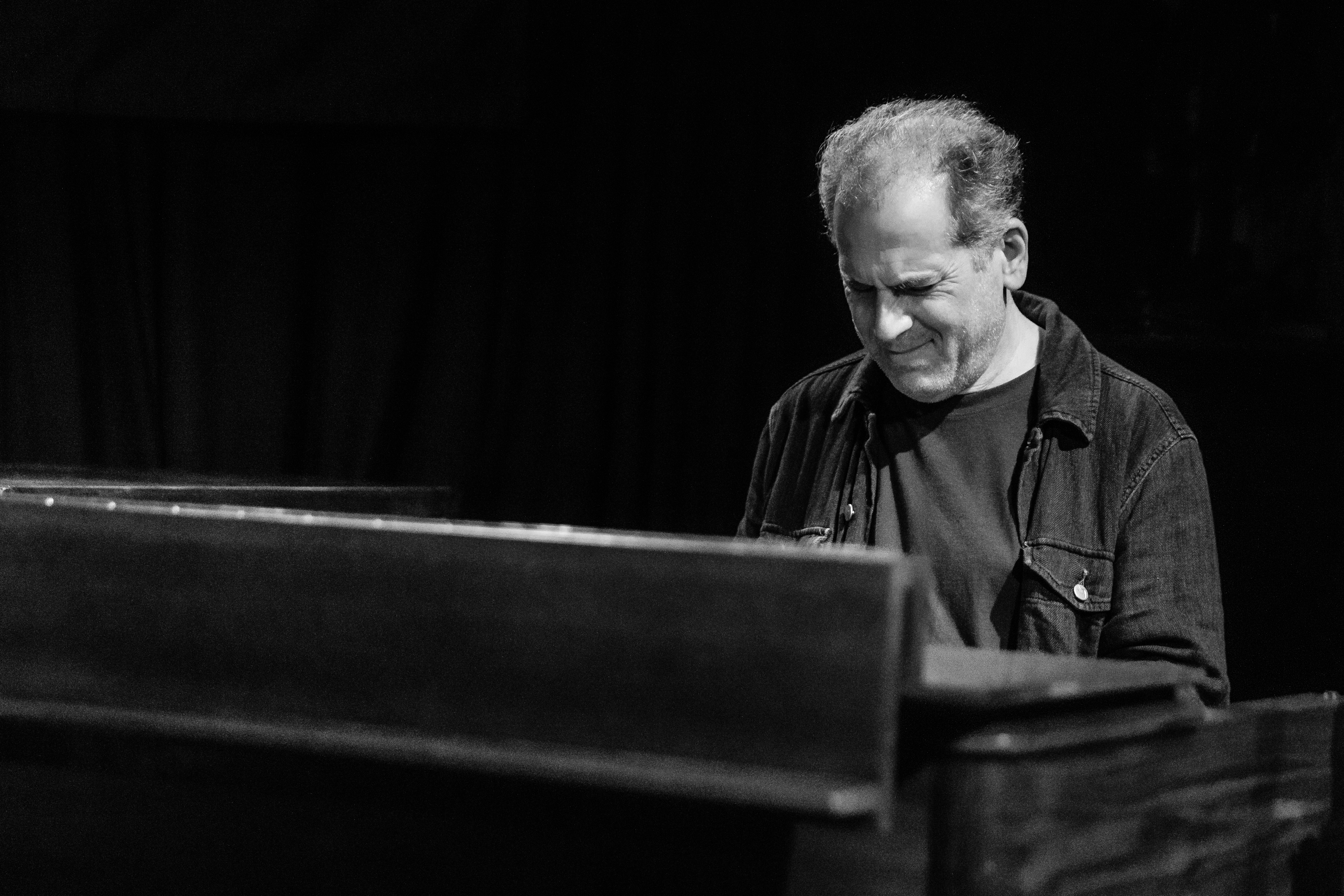

Background information
- Born: Lawrence Sam Goldings; August 28, 1968 (age 58); Boston, Massachusetts, U.S.
- Genres: Jazz; folk; pop
- Occupations: Musician; composer
- Instruments: Piano; organ
- Labels: Warner Bros.; ECM; Verve; Palmetto
- Website: larrygoldings.com

Lawrence Sam Goldings (born August 28, 1968) is a Grammy-nominated American jazz pianist, organist, and composer. His music has explored elements of funk, blues, and fusion. Goldings has a comedic alter ego known as Hans Groiner.

== Life and career ==
Goldings was born in Boston. His father was a classical music enthusiast, and Goldings studied classical piano until the age of twelve. Through his father he met pianist Dave McKenna and studied with pianists Ran Blake and Keith Jarrett. Among his other influences were Bill Evans, Red Garland, Erroll Garner, and Oscar Peterson. After high school, he enrolled in the jazz program at New York's The New School, where he further honed his skills studying with Jaki Byard and Fred Hersch. It was during this period that pianist Roland Hanna invited Goldings to accompany him to Copenhagen for a three-day series of private concerts where Goldings performed with Sarah Vaughan, Kenny Burrell, Tommy Flanagan, Hank Jones, Harry "Sweets" Edison, and Al Cohn. Also prior to graduating, Goldings toured with singer Jon Hendricks, an association that led to an almost three year collaboration with guitarist Jim Hall.

After receiving his degree, he led a trio with guitarist Peter Bernstein and drummer Bill Stewart. His debut album Intimacy of the Blues was released in 1991. Over the course of his career, he also has collaborated with many musicians including Joshua Redman, Maceo Parker, Idris Muhammad, Kurt Rosenwinkel, David Sanborn, Paul Motian, Larry Grenadier, Michael Brecker, Pat Metheny, James Moody, Mark Turner, John Sneider, Ben Allison, Matt Wilson, Harry Allen, Jack DeJohnette, John Scofield, John Pizzarelli, Charlie Haden, Robben Ford, Steve Gadd, Jim Keltner, Anthony Wilson, Pino Palladino, James Taylor, and John Mayer.

Record producers he has worked with include Russ Titelman, Larry Klein, Steve Jordan, Tommy LiPuma, Dave Grusin, Joe Henry, Blake Mills, Mike Viola, and T Bone Burnett. One of Goldings' first collaborations with Larry Klein includes the Madeleine Peyroux recording of Leonard Cohen's "Dance Me to the End of Love" with Goldings on Wurlitzer piano, pump organ, Hammond B3 organ, celeste, and piano solo.

Goldings is known for his gifts as a bass player on the Hammond organ, integral to his collaboration with Michael Brecker and Pat Metheny on Time is of the Essence and evident in the Pat Metheny composition "Extradition" during their 1999–2000 world tour. James Taylor's One Man Band 2007 live album and world tour draws heavily on Goldings' bass playing abilities, making the one man band concept possible. The album and tour also include Goldings' composition "School Song." Larry Goldings' Hammond organ is heard on John Mayer's song "Gravity," on the Grammy award-winning album, Continuum.

In 2007, Larry Goldings, Jack DeJohnette and John Scofield received a Grammy Award nomination in the category of Best Jazz Instrumental Album Individual or Group for their live album, Trio Beyond – Saudades. In 2017, Goldings with the Steve Gadd Band received a Grammy nomination in the category of Best Contemporary Instrumental Album for Way Back Home.

In 2012 and 2013, Goldings was chosen to participate in both the Sundance Institute Documentary Film and Sundance Feature Film Composer Fellowship Programs. At the Documentary Film Lab in Sundance, Utah, Goldings scored scenes from filmmaker Johanna Hamilton's "1971." Goldings continued to work with the Sundance Institute in 2013, at the feature film lab held for the first time at Skywalker Ranch in Marin County. There he collaborated with filmmaker Pamela Romanowsky, scoring scenes from her film The Adderall Diaries. Goldings' advisors in that program included noted film composers Mark Isham, Heitor Pereira, Harry Gregson-Williams, and Thomas Newman.

== Style and influences ==
Goldings' melodic style of organ playing has often been compared to that of Larry Young. On organ Goldings cites as his first inspirations the solo piano style of Dave McKenna "who walks his own bass lines better than anyone" and Billy Preston accompanying Aretha Franklin on "Bridge Over Troubled Water." Other musical influences cited by Goldings include the Wes Montgomery records which feature Mel Rhyne and Jimmy Smith; Shirley Scott; Chester Thompson; Joe Zawinul; and Jack McDuff. Goldings' 1990s collaborations with Maceo Parker provided an authentic understanding of the language of funk music, and the voicings and rhythmic comping on the Hammond B3 organ as passed down by James Brown to Parker.

== Awards and honors ==
- Best Jazz Album of the Year, The New Yorker, Big Stuff (1996), Awareness (1997)
- Organist/Keyboardist of the Year, Jazz Journalists Association, 2000, 2001
- Grammy Award Nomination, Best Jazz Album of the Year, 2007
- Grammy Award Nomination, Best Contemporary Instrumental Album, 2017
- Best Jazz Song, "High Dreams," John Lennon Songwriting Competition, 2019
- Downbeat Critics Poll Organist of the Year, 2024
- Downbeat Readers Poll Organist of the Year, 2024
- Downbeat Critics Poll Organist of the Year, 2025
- Downbeat Readers Poll Organist of the Year, 2025
- Downbeat Critics Poll Organist of the Year, 2026

== Discography ==
=== As leader/co-leader ===
Year recorded	Title	Label	Year released	Personnel
1991	Intimacy of the Blues	Verve	1991	Most tracks trio, with Peter Bernstein (guitar), Bill Stewart (drums); three tracks quartet, with David "Fathead" Newman (tenor sax)
1992	Light Blue	Minor Music	1992	Trio, with Peter Bernstein (guitar), Bill Stewart (drums)
1993	Caminhos Cruzados	Novus/RCA	1994	With Peter Bernstein (guitar), Bill Stewart (drums), Guilherme Franco (percussion); Joshua Redman (tenor sax) on three tracks
1995	Whatever It Takes	Warner Bros.	1995	With Peter Bernstein (guitar), Bill Stewart (drums); plus guests Fred Wesley (trombone), Joshua Redman (tenor sax), David Sanborn and Maceo Parker (alto sax), Richard Patterson (bass)
1996	Big Stuff	Warner Bros.	1996	With Peter Bernstein (guitar), Bill Stewart (drums), Kurt Rosenwinkel (guitar), Idris Muhammad (drums), Bashiri Johnson (percussion), Guilherme Franco (percussion), John McKenna (tenor saxophone)
1996	Awareness	Warner Bros.	1997	With Larry Grenadier (bass), Paul Motian (drums)
1999	Moonbird	Palmetto	1999	Trio, with Peter Bernstein (guitar), Bill Stewart (drums)
2000?	Voodoo Dogs	Palmetto	2000	With Bob Ward (guitarist)
2000	As One	Palmetto	2001	Trio, with Peter Bernstein (guitar), Bill Stewart (drums)
2002	Sweet Science	Palmetto	2002	Trio, with Peter Bernstein (guitar), Bill Stewart (drums)
2004	Saudades	ECM	2006	As Trio Beyond; trio, with John Scofield (guitar), Jack DeJohnette (drums); in concert
2005?	Quartet	Palmetto	2006	Most tracks quartet, with John Sneider (cornet, trumpet), Ben Allison (bass), Matt Wilson (drums); one track quintet, with Madeleine Peyroux (vocals)
2007?	Long Story Short	Sticky Mack	2007	With Peter Bernstein (guitar), Bill Stewart (drums)
2007, 2009	When Larry Met Harry	Café Society	2010	Quartet, with Harry Allen (tenor sax), Doug Weiss and Neil Miner (bass; separately), Andy Watson (drums)
2010 – 2011	In My Room	BFM Jazz	2011	Solo piano
2011	Live at Smalls	Smalls Live	2011	Trio, with Peter Bernstein (guitar), Bill Stewart (drums)
2013	Ramshackle Serenade	Pirouet	2014	Trio, with Peter Bernstein (guitar), Bill Stewart (drums)
2014?	Music from the Front Room	Sticky Mack	2014	Trio, with David Piltch (bass), Jay Bellerose (drums)
2016	Toy Tunes	Pirouet	2018	Trio, with Peter Bernstein (guitar), Bill Stewart (drums)
2017?	Radio Music Vol.1	Bandcamp	2018	All music written and performed by Goldings
2018?	Scary Goldings	Scary Pockets	2018	With Scary Pockets
2019?	Scary Goldings: The Ego Trap	Scary Pockets	2019	With Scary Pockets
2020?	Tie Me to You	Monsoon	2020	With Kathleen Grace
2021?	Earthshine	Colorfield	2021	All music written and performed by Goldings
2021	Perpetual Pendulum	Smoke Sessions	2022	
2025?	Scary Goldings: The Holy Enchilada	Scary Pockets	2025	With Scary Pockets

Main sources:

=== As sideman ===
With Peter Bernstein

- Brain Dance (Criss Cross Jazz, 1996)
- Earth Tones (Criss Cross Jazz, 1998)

With Till Brönner

- Oceana (EmArcy, 2006)
- Rio (Verve, 2008)
- At the End of the Day (Bam Bam, 2010)
- The Good Life (Masterworks, 2016)

With Chris Minh Doky

- Listen Up! (Virgin, 2000)
- Cinematique (Blue Note/Capitol, 2002)
- Scenes from a Dream (Red Dot, 2010)

With Sia

- Colour the Small One (Astralwerks, 2004)
- Some People Have Real Problems (Hear Music, 2008)

With Robben Ford

- Truth (Concord, 2007)
- Soul on Ten (Concord, 2009)
- Bringing It Back Home (Provogue, 2013)

With Steve Gadd

- Gadditude (BFM, 2013)
- Steve Gadd Band 70 Strong (BFM, 2015)
- Way Back Home (BFM, 2016)
- Steve Gadd Band (BFM, 2018)

With Melody Gardot

- My One and Only Thrill (Verve, 2009)
- The Absence (Decca, 2012)
- Currency of Man (Decca, 2015)

With Jesse Harris

- Mineral (Secret Sun, 2006)
- No Wrong No Right (Dangerbird, 2015)

With Jim Hall

- Subsequently (MusicMasters, 1992)
- Something Special (MusicMasters/Limelight, 1993)

With Colin Hay

- Company of Strangers (Lazy Eye, 2002)
- Are You Lookin' at Me? (Compass/Lazy Eye, 2007)
- Next Year People (Compass/Lazy Eye, 2015)

With Adam Levy

- Buttermilk Channel (Lost Wax, 2001)
- Town & Country (Lost Wax, 2014)

With John Mayer

- Continuum (Columbia, 2006)
- The Search for Everything (Columbia, 2017)

With Jessica Molaskey

- Make Believe (PS Classics, 2003)
- Sitting in Limbo (PS Classics, 2007)
- Portraits of Joni (Ghostlight, 2017)

With James Moody

- Young at Heart (Warner Bros., 1996)
- Warner Jams Vol. 2: The Two Tenors (Warner Bros., 1997)

With Maceo Parker

- Roots Revisited (Verve, 1990)
- Mo' Roots (Verve, 1991)
- Life on Planet Groove (Verve, 1992)

With Rebecca Pidgeon

- Behind the Velvet Curtain (Great American Music, 2008)
- Bad Poetry (Toy Canteen, 2014)

With Madeleine Peyroux

- Careless Love (Rounder, 2004)
- Half the Perfect World (Rounder, 2006)
- Bare Bones (Rounder/Decca, 2008)
- The Blue Room (Decca/EmArcy, 2012)

With John Pizzarelli

- Double Exposure (Telarc, 2012)
- Midnight McCartney (Concord, 2015)

With Tim Ries

- Alternate Side (Criss Cross Jazz, 2001)
- The Rolling Stones Project (Concord, 2005)

With Lee Ritenour

- 6 String Theory (Concord, 2010)
- Rhythm Sessions (Concord, 2012)

With John Scofield

- Hand Jive (Blue Note, 1994)
- Groove Elation (Blue Note, 1995)
- Steady Groovin (Blue Note, 2000, compilation)
- That's What I Say (Verve, 2005)
- A Moment's Peace (EmArcy, 2011)
- Country for Old Men (Impulse!, 2016)

With Mark Sholtez

- The Distance Between Two Truths (Warner, 2010)
- The Edge of the Known World (Ambition, 2015)

With Bill Stewart

- Incandescence (Pirouet, 2008)
- Live at Smalls (Smallslive, 2011)
- Ramshackle Serenade (Pirouet, 2014)
- Toy Tunes (Pirouet, 2018)

With Curtis Stigers

- Baby Plays Around (Concord Jazz, 2001)
- Secret Heart (Concord Jazz, 2002)
- You Inspire Me (Concord Jazz, 2003) – also as producer
- I Think It's Going To Rain Today (Concord Jazz, 2005) – also as producer
- Real Emotional (Concord Jazz, 2007) – also as producer
- Lost In Dreams (Concord Jazz, 2009)
- Let's Go Out Tonight (Concord Jazz, 2012)

With Dave Stryker

- Blue Degrees (SteepleChase, 1993) – rec. 1992
- Shades of Miles (SteepleChase, 2000)

With James Taylor

- October Road (Columbia, 2002)
- A Christmas Album (Hallmark, 2004)
- One Man Band (Hear Music, 2007)
- Other Covers (Hear Music, 2009)
- Before This World (Concord, 2015)
- American Standard (Fantasy, 2020)

With Matt Wilson

- As Wave Follows Wave (Palmetto, 1996)
- Arts and Crafts (Palmetto, 2001)

With Lazlo Bane

- All the Time in the World (self-released, 2002)
- Guilty Pleasures (Lookout Sound, 2007)

With Lisa Loeb

- The Way It Really Is (Zoe, 2004)
- Lullaby Girl (Furious Rose Productions, 2017) – also as producer

With Jane Monheit

- Home (EmArcy, 2010)
- The Heart of the Matter (EmArcy, 2013)

With Pomplamoose

- À Cabo (2023)
- Tu Peux Pas Savoir (2023)
- Valse d'Antan (2025) – originally recorded as instrumental composition on "When Harry Met Larry"
- Photogenique (2025) – as composer and perfomer

With others

- Casey Abrams, Casey Abrams (Concord, 2012)
- Priscilla Ahn, A Good Day (Blue Note, 2008)
- Harry Allen, Christmas in Swingtime (Koch Jazz, 2001)
- Herb Alpert, The Christmas Wish (Herb Alpert Presents, 2017)
- India Arie, Acoustic Soul (Motown, 2001)
- Walter Becker, Circus Money (5 Over 12, Mailboat 2008)
- Bob Belden, When Doves Cry (Metro Blue, 1994)
- Carla Bley, 4x4 (ECM, 2000)
- Don Braden, Organic (Epicure, 1995)
- Michael Brecker, Time Is of the Essence (Verve, 1999)
- Brian Bromberg, Compared to That (Artistry Music, 2012)
- Tom Browne, Another Shade of Browne (Hip Bop Essence, 1996)
- Michael Buble, Nobody but Me (Reprise, 2016)
- Dewa Budjana, Joged Kahyangan (Moonjune, 2013)
- Gary Burton, Six Pack (GRP, 1992)
- Chiara Civello, Last Quarter Moon (Verve Forecast, 2005)
- Holly Cole, Holly (Rumpus Room, 2018)
- Luis Conte, En Casa de Luis (BFM, 2011)
- Adam Czerwiński & Darek Oleszkiewicz, Raindance (AC, 2006)
- Nataly Dawn, How I Knew Her (Nonesuch, 2013)
- Lea DeLaria, Play It Cool (Warner Bros., 2001)
- Kat Edmonson, Way Down Low (Okeh/Masterworks, 2013)
- Mark Eitzel, Don't Be a Stranger (Merge, 2012)
- Dominick Farinacci, Short Stories (Mack Avenue, 2016)
- Steve Gadd, Gadditude (BFM, 2013)
- Sara Gazarek, Blossom & Bee (Palmetto, 2012)
- Herbie Hancock, The Imagine Project (Sony, 2010)
- Jon Hendricks, Freddie Freeloader (Denon, 1990)
- Benjamin Herman, Get In (A-, 1999)
- Christopher Hollyday, On Course (Novus, 1990)
- Satoshi Inoue, Plays Satoshi (Paddle Wheel, 1996)
- Jacintha, Jacintha Goes to Hollywood (Groove Note, 2007)
- Javon Jackson, Pleasant Valley (Blue Note, 1999)
- Al Jarreau, Accentuate the Positive (Verve, 2004)
- Elton John, The Diving Board (Mercury, 2013)
- Norah Jones, Not Too Late (Blue Note, 2006)
- Rickie Lee Jones, The Devil You Know (Concord, 2012)
- Michael Landau, Organic Instrumentals (Tone Center, 2012)
- Hugh Laurie, Didn't It Rain (Warner Bros., 2013)
- John Legend, Darkness and Light (Columbia, 2016)
- Kevyn Lettau, Bye-Bye Blackbird (MCG, 2005)
- Joe Magnarelli, Always There (Criss Cross Jazz, 1997)
- Kevin Mahogany, Kevin Mahogany (Warner Bros., 1996)
- Arnold McCuller, Soon As I Get Paid (What's Good, 2011)
- Michael McDonald, Wide Open (Chonin, BMG 2017)
- Vince Mendoza, Nights on Earth (Art of Groove, 2011)
- Lea Michele, Louder (Columbia/Sony, 2014)
- Bette Midler, It's the Girls! (EastWest/Warner Bros., 2014)
- Bob Mintzer, Canyon Cove (Pony Canyon, 2010)
- Gaby Moreno, Ilusíon (Metamorfosis Enterprises, 2016)
- Ronald Muldrow, Gnowing You (Bellaphon/L+R, 1991)
- Alexi Murdoch, Four Songs (Mindblue Music, 2002)
- Leona Naess, Thirteens (Verve Forecast, 2008)
- Josh Nelson, The Sky Remains (Origin, 2017)
- Chris Potter, Pure (Concord Jazz, 1995)
- Bobby Previte, Hue and Cry (Enja, 1994)
- Eros Ramazzotti, Ali e radici (Sony/RCA 2009)
- Jim Rotondi, Introducing Jim Rotondi (Criss Cross Jazz, 1997)
- Leon Russell, Life Journey (Universal, 2014)
- David Sanborn, Closer (Verve, 2005)
- Judi Silvano, Songs I Wrote or Wish I Did (JSL, 2000)
- Luciana Souza, Tide (Verve, 2009)
- John Stein, Portraits and Landscapes (Jardis, 2000)
- Rod Stewart, Fly Me to the Moon... The Great American Songbook Volume V (Sony, 2010)
- Tierney Sutton, After Blue (BFM, 2013)
- Nedelle Torrisi, Only for You (Frenchkiss, 2018)
- Billy Valentine, Billy Valentine & the Universal Truth (Acid Jazz, 2023)
- Doug Webb, Swing Shift (Posi-Tone, 2011)
- Noam Weinstein, Clocked (2012)
- Walt Weiskopf, A World Away (Criss Cross Jazz, 1995)
- Anthony Wilson, Jack of Hearts (Groove Note, 2009)
- Lyle Workman, Harmonic Crusader (Infrared, 2009)
- Nikki Yanofsky, Nikki (Decca, 2010)
- Jacob Young, This Is You (NorCD, 1995)

== Film and TV credits ==
- 2020 Self Made: Inspired by the Life of Madam C.J. Walker (TV series composer)
- 2016 The Founder (soundtrack featuring "In Spite of Everything" composed and performed by Larry Goldings)
- 2015 Trainwreck (soundtrack featuring "The Morning After" composed and performed by Larry Goldings)
- 2014 Neighbors (soundtrack featuring "Tanglefoot Bounce" composed and performed by Larry Goldings)
- 2014 Good Morning America and Walmart Soundcheck (featuring "Battlefield" an original composition performed by Lea Michele)
- 2013 The Mark of Beauty (featuring "Strays" an original composition performed by Larry Goldings)
- 2013 Dealing With Idiots (film composer)
- 2009 The Dream's on Me (featured in film and on soundtrack)
- 2009 Funny People (featuring "Memory" performed by Larry Goldings and Maude Apatow, and "Tuscany" (originally titled "Dario and Bario"), an original composition performed by Larry Goldings)
- 2008 Bernard and Doris (HBO) (soundtrack featuring performance by Larry Goldings )
- 2008 The Office (NBC) (soundtrack featuring performance by Larry Goldings)
- 2008 Great Performances on PBS: James Taylor: One Man Band (featuring Larry Goldings as "One Man Band" and "School Song" an original composition performed by Larry Goldings)
- 2005 Proof (soundtrack featuring "Uganda," an original composition performed by Larry Goldings)
- 2000 Space Cowboys (soundtrack featuring several arrangements of jazz standards performed by Larry Goldings)
