= Zach Braff =

American actor and filmmaker (born 1975)

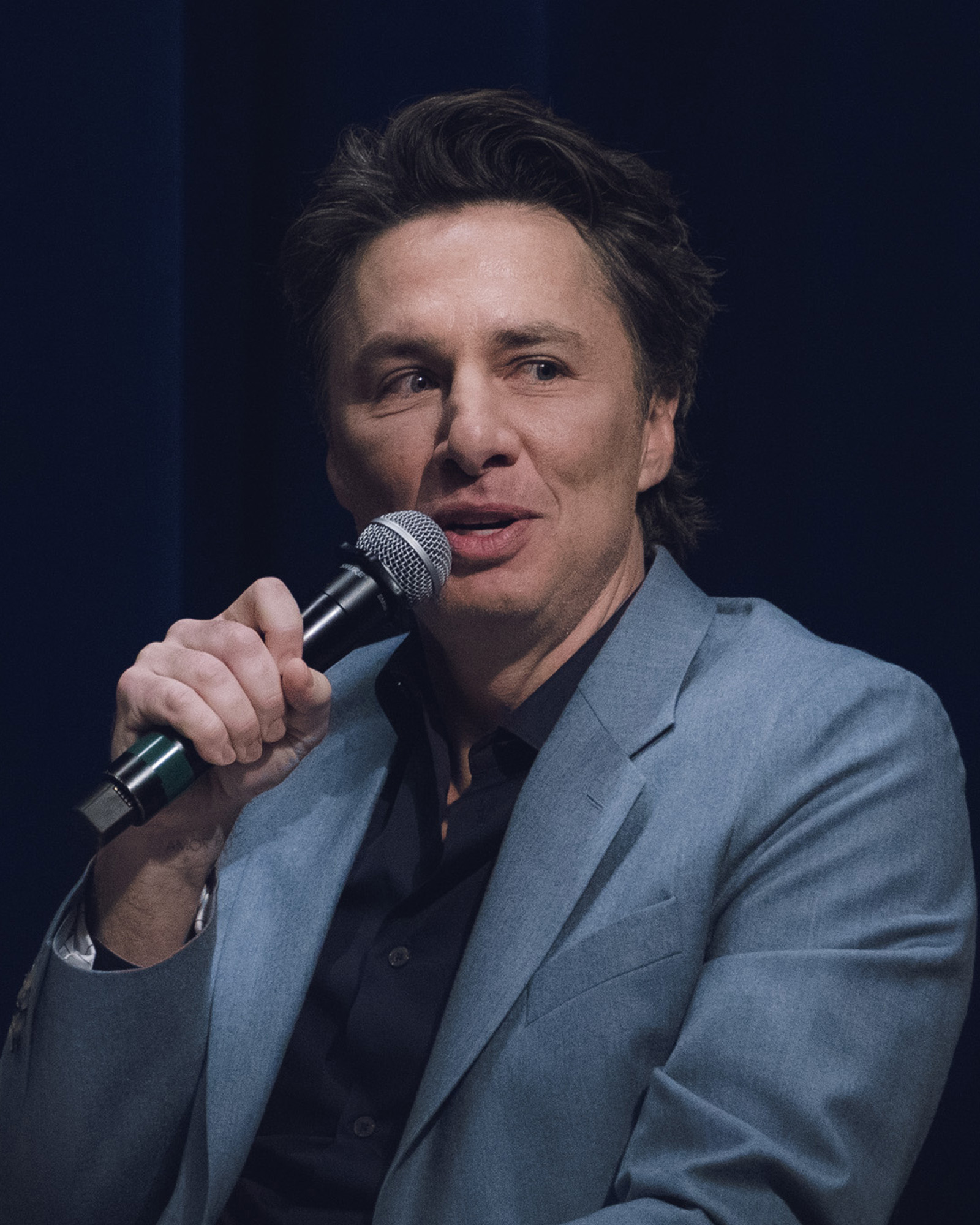
- Braff in 2024
- Born: Zachary Israel Braff; April 6, 1975 (age 51); South Orange, New Jersey, U.S.
- Education: Northwestern University (BA)
- Occupations: Actor; filmmaker
- Years active: 1989–present
- Relatives: Joshua Braff (brother); Jessica Kirson (stepsister)

Zachary Israel Braff (born April 6, 1975) is an American actor and filmmaker. He is best known for his role as Dr. John "J.D." Dorian on the NBC/ABC television series comedy-drama television series Scrubs (2001–2010) and its 2026 revival series, for which he was nominated for the Primetime Emmy Award for Outstanding Lead Actor in a Comedy Series in 2005 as well as for three Golden Globe Awards from 2005 to 2007. He starred in The Broken Hearts Club: A Romantic Comedy (2000), The Last Kiss (2006), The Ex (2006), and In Dubious Battle (2016). He has done voice-work for Chicken Little (2005) and Oz the Great and Powerful (2013).

In 2004, Braff made his directorial debut with Garden State in which he also starred. Additionally, he wrote the screenplay and compiled the soundtrack album. He shot the film in his home state of New Jersey with a budget of $2.5 million. The film made over $35 million at the box office and was praised by critics, leading it to gain a cult following. He won numerous awards for his directing work and also won the Grammy Award for Best Soundtrack Album in 2005. In 2014, Braff directed his second film, Wish I Was Here, which he partially funded with a Kickstarter campaign.

Braff has appeared on stage in the dark comedy All New People, in which he starred, and also wrote. The play premiered in New York City in 2011 before playing in London's West End. He also played the lead role in a musical adaptation of Woody Allen's Bullets Over Broadway in 2014.

== Early life ==
Zachary Israel Braff was born on April 6, 1975, in South Orange, New Jersey, and grew up there and in neighboring Maplewood. His father, Harold Irwin "Hal" Braff (1934–2018), was a trial attorney, professor and alumnus at Rutgers Law School, a founder of the state's American Inns of Court (AIC) and an elected trustee of the National Inns of Court Foundation. His mother, Anne Hutchinson Maynard, worked as a clinical psychologist. His parents divorced and remarried others during Braff's childhood. Braff's father was born into a Jewish family and Braff's mother, originally a Protestant, converted to Judaism before marrying his father. Braff said that he had a "very strong conservative/orthodox [Jewish] upbringing". He had his bar mitzvah service at Oheb Shalom Congregation. In 2005, he said that he was "not a huge organized-religion guy", and, in 2013, that "the religion [Judaism] doesn't necessarily work for me".

Braff's older brother is author Joshua Braff while his other brother, Adam Braff, is a writer and producer. His stepsister, Jessica Kirson, is a stand-up comedian.

Braff wanted to be a filmmaker since his early childhood; he has described it as his "life dream". Braff was diagnosed with obsessive–compulsive disorder at age ten. During his childhood, Braff was a friend of future Fugees member Lauryn Hill at Columbia High School in Maplewood.

Braff attended Stagedoor Manor, a performing arts "training center" for youth actors ages 10 to 18. Stagedoor was where Braff met and befriended actor Josh Charles. Braff also knows Stagedoor alums Natalie Portman, Mandy Moore, and Joshua Radin well. Braff studied film studies at Northwestern University's School of Communication and became a brother of the Phi Kappa Psi fraternity; he graduated in the class of 1997.

== Career ==
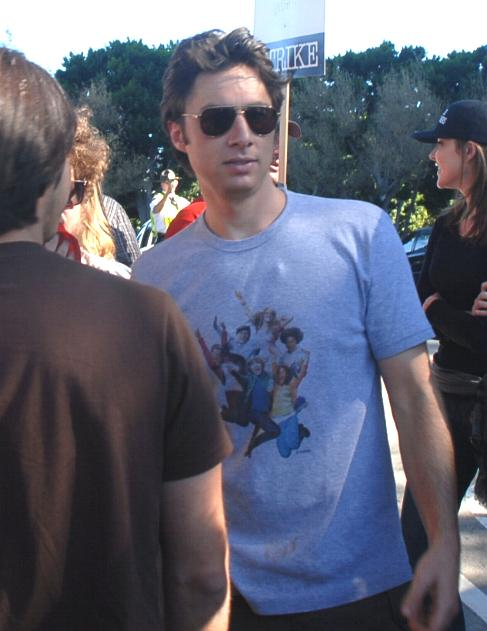
Braff in 2007

=== Early work and breakthrough ===
One of Braff's earliest roles was in High, a proposed 1989 CBS television series with a cast that also included Gwyneth Paltrow and Craig Ferguson; the television pilot never made it on air. Braff appeared in the 1990s series The Baby-sitters Club, in the episode "Dawn Saves the Trees". He appeared in Woody Allen's 1993 film Manhattan Murder Mystery. In 1998, Braff had a part in a George C. Wolfe production of Macbeth for New York City's Public Theater.

Braff played "J.D." (short for the character's full name, John Dorian) on the medical comedy television series Scrubs, which debuted in 2001. The role was Braff's first major role in a television show. Braff was nominated for three Golden Globes and an Emmy for his work on the show. Braff directed several episodes of Scrubs, including the 100th episode, "My Way Home". For the show's ninth season Braff was a cast member for six episodes and also served as one of the executive producers.

=== Filmmaking ===
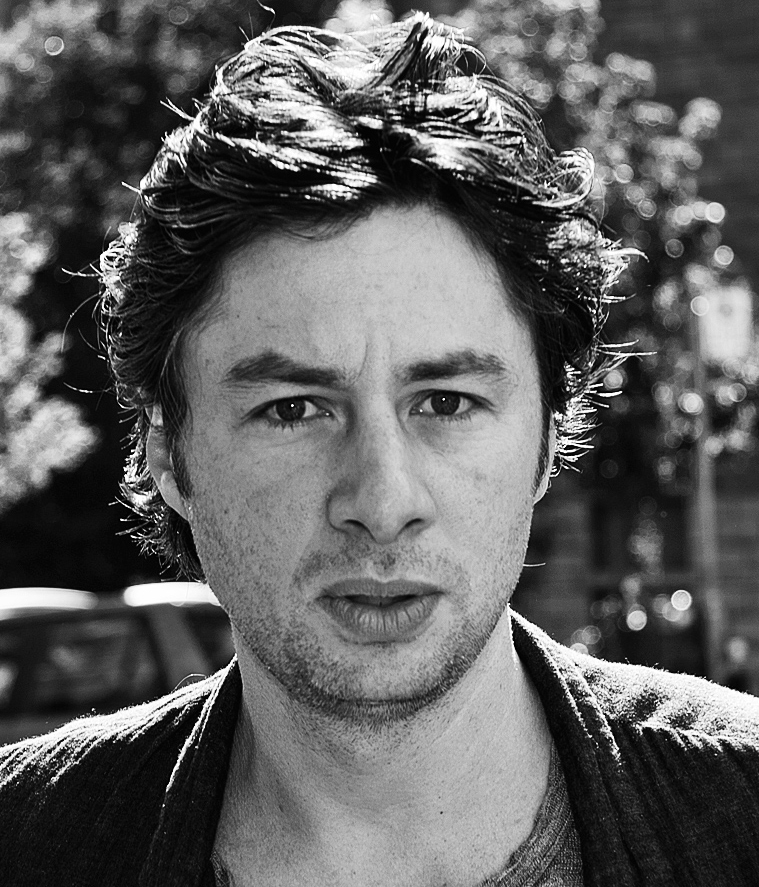
Braff at the 2010 Toronto International Film Festival

Braff starred in Garden State, also directing and producing it. The film was filmed in his home state of New Jersey. Producers were initially reluctant to finance the film; Braff wrote it in six months. At the 2005 Grammy Awards, his "mixtape" won a Grammy for Best Compilation Soundtrack Album for a Motion Picture, Television or Other Visual Media for the Garden State soundtrack.

On April 24, 2013, Braff started a Kickstarter campaign to finance the film Wish I Was Here, based on a script he wrote with his brother Adam. The $2 million goal was reached in three days. He directed and starred in the film which was released in 2014.

Braff was the executive producer of the documentary Video Games: The Movie. He was also one of the executive producers of The Internet's Own Boy: The Story of Aaron Swartz, released in 2014. He has directed several music videos: Gavin DeGraw's "Chariot", Joshua Radin's "Closer", Radin's "I'd Rather Be With You", and Lazlo Bane's "Superman" which is the theme song from Scrubs. His music production led to newfound success for some of the artists featured on his film soundtracks including The Shins, who were prominently featured on the Garden State and Scrubs soundtracks, resulting in the expression "the Zach Braff effect".

In 2020, Braff directed the short film In The Time It Takes To Get There, starring Alicia Silverstone and Florence Pugh. The film was based on a poster created by Sam West, the winner of an Adobe contest in 2018. In 2021, Braff was nominated for a Directors Guild of America Award and a Primetime Emmy Award for Outstanding Directing for a Comedy Series for directing an episode of the Apple TV+ comedy show Ted Lasso, which was co-created by Scrubs creator Bill Lawrence. Braff has also directed at least one episode from each season of the Apple TV series Shrinking, also co-created by Lawrence.

Braff wrote, directed, and produced the drama film A Good Person starring Morgan Freeman and Florence Pugh. It was released on March 24, 2023.

==== In development ====
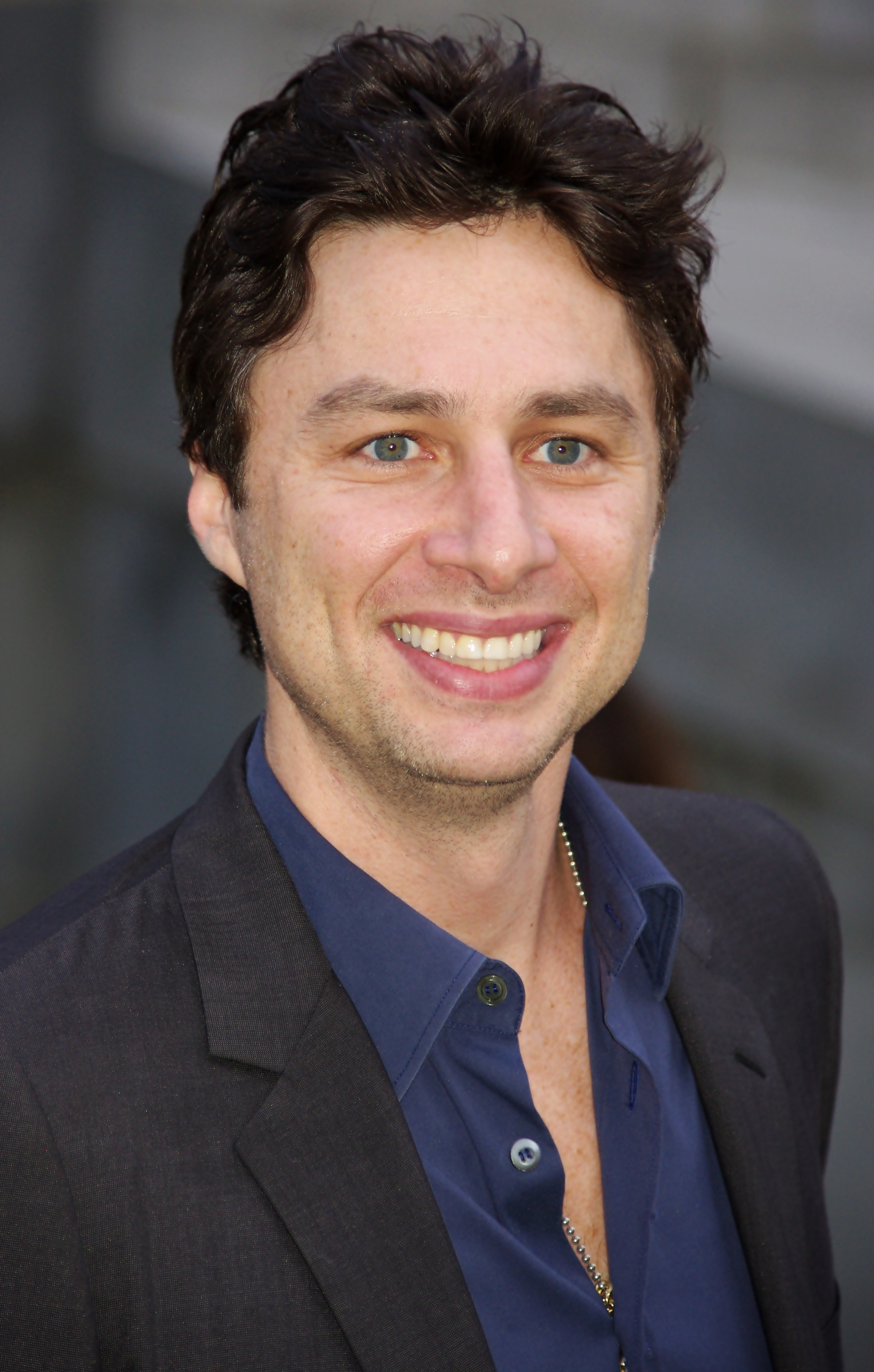
Braff in 2011

Braff was expected to direct Open Hearts, a remake of the 2002 Danish film Elsker dig for evigt (Love You Forever). The film is about a woman who has an affair with her paralyzed husband's doctor, whose wife caused the accident that put her husband in a wheelchair. It was first revealed that Braff was directing Open Hearts in 2006, however, the film was eventually canceled. Braff said "It fell apart at the last second due to scheduling and budget, as so many movies do." At the same time, Braff's film The Last Kiss was being released.

In 2009, Braff was working on the script for Swingles, a film based on a spec script by Duncan Birmingham; he was to direct and star in the film alongside Cameron Diaz. As of 2021, no further public announcements about the film's development status have been released.

=== Other roles ===
Along with other Scrubs cast members, Braff has a cameo role in It's a Very Merry Muppet Christmas Movie.

He also voiced the titular character in the Disney animated film Chicken Little (2005), and has reprised the role in various Disney video games such as Chicken Little, Kingdom Hearts II, Chicken Little: Ace in Action and Kingdom Hearts 2.5 HD ReMIX. Braff has also done voiceovers for commercials, including a PUR water campaign, Wendy's in 2007 and 2008, and in Cottonelle as the voice of the puppy. He also provided the voice of Finley in the Disney film Oz The Great and Powerful (2013). In 2005, Braff was featured on Punk'd when he was tricked into chasing and then beating a supposed vandal who appeared to be spray-painting his brand new Porsche.

Braff was in talks to star in the film Fletch Won and had signed on to play the role eventually played by Dane Cook in Mr. Brooks, but dropped out of both roles to work on Open Hearts, which he adapted from a Danish film and planned to direct. He has also co-written a film version of Andrew Henry's Meadow, a children's book, with his brother, and was scheduled to direct one of the segments for the film New York, I Love You.

In July 2009, he signed on as an executive producer of the documentary Heart of Stone to "help spread the word about it."

Braff starred in the romantic drama The Last Kiss, which opened on September 15, 2006. Braff tweaked several parts of Paul Haggis' script for the film, as he wanted the script to be as "real as possible" and "really courageous" regarding its subject matter. As with Garden State, Braff was involved with the film's soundtrack, serving as executive producer. The film's director, Tony Goldwyn, compared Braff to a younger version of Tim Allen, describing Braff as "incredibly accessible to an audience...a real guy, an everyman."

In 2007, Braff starred in the film The Ex (2007). He also starred in the Canadian indie film The High Cost of Living with Québécois actress Isabelle Blais in 2010. Directed by Deborah Chow, the film was shot in Montreal and principal photography wrapped on March 9, 2010. Braff stated he enjoyed filming in the country in which The Last Kiss was also shot. The film premiered at the Toronto International Film Festival and was also shown at the Tribeca Film Festival.

Braff played the lead role of Alex in Alex, Inc., a television comedy based on a family man who quit his radio career to launch a podcasting company. ABC cancelled the show after one season.

=== Theater ===
Braff returned to the Public Theater in 2002, in a part in Twelfth Night, staged in Central Park. In mid-2010, Braff took a lead role in Trust, at the Second Stage Theatre, a contemporary Off-Broadway theater company. The play ran from July 23 to September 12, extending its scheduled run by one week. Braff wrote on Facebook that he was "Having so much fun doing Trust." The play co-starred Sutton Foster, Ari Graynor, and Bobby Cannavale, was written by Paul Weitz and directed by Peter DuBois. Braff played Henry, a wealthy married man who "looks to find something real in the most unlikely of places."

In early 2011, Braff announced that he had written a play to be performed at the Second Stage Theatre in mid-2011. His play, All New People, is set on Long Beach Island and centers on Charlie, a 35-year-old from Braff's home state New Jersey. The play was directed by Peter DuBois, who directed Braff in Trust the previous year. When announcing the play on Facebook, Braff wrote that 'one of my dreams comes true'. In 2012, Braff moved the play on tour to the UK, playing in Manchester at the Manchester Opera House between February 8–11, Glasgow at the King's Theatre between February 14–18, and finally in London for 10 weeks at the Duke of York's Theatre from February 22.

On April 10, 2014, Braff opened on Broadway in the musical Bullets Over Broadway The Musical, an adaptation of Woody Allen's 1994 film, directed and choreographed by Susan Stroman.

=== Other pursuits ===
In 2009, Braff opened the Mermaid Oyster Bar in New York City with chef and high school friend Laurence Edelman, as well as Danny Abrams.

Proprietors of the Rio Theater in Monte Rio, California, credited Braff with making the donation that put their Kickstarter campaign over the target to buy a digital projector over its $60,000 goal in May 2013.

=== 2020s ===
In March 2020, Braff and Scrubs co-star Donald Faison launched a Scrubs rewatch podcast titled Fake Doctors, Real Friends. Distributed by iHeartRadio, the duo also shares stories and experiences of their time on set. Guests on the podcast include their co-stars Sarah Chalke, Judy Reyes, Neil Flynn, John C. McGinley, Christa Miller, and Ken Jenkins as well as the show's creator, Bill Lawrence and director Michael Spiller.

In 2025, multiple entertainment trade publications confirmed that Braff had been officially attached to a revival of Scrubs produced by ABC and 20th Television. The series premiered on February 25, 2026.

== Personal life ==
Braff dated actress Mandy Moore from 2004 to 2006. He also had a relationship with model Taylor Bagley from 2009 to 2014. His relationship with actress Florence Pugh from 2019 to 2022 generated controversy due to their 21-year age gap; he directed her in his 2019 short film In the Time it Takes to Get There and the drama film A Good Person. Braff primarily lives in Los Angeles and has an apartment in Union Square, Manhattan, New York City previously owned by theatre director Tom O'Horgan which he purchased in 2007.

In November 2008, Braff earned his pilot's license flying a Cirrus SR20.

=== Political views ===
In 2012, Braff endorsed the re-election campaign of President Barack Obama.

== Filmography ==
=== Film ===
| Year | Title | Role | Notes |
|---|---|---|---|
| 1993 | Manhattan Murder Mystery | Nick Lipton | |
| 1994 | My Summer As A Girl | Tony / Tammy | |
| 1999 | Getting to Know You | Wesley | |
| 2000 | Endsville | Dean | |
| 2000 | Blue Moon | Young Fred | |
| 2000 | The Broken Hearts Club: A Romantic Comedy | Benji | |
| 2004 | Garden State | Andrew Largeman | Also director and writer Chicago Film Critics Association Award for Most Promising Filmmaker; Crystal Image Award; Florida Film Critics Circle's Pauline Kael Breakout Award; Hollywood Breakthrough Award for Breakthrough Directing; Independent Spirit Award for Best First Feature (shared with producers Pamela Abdy, Gary Gilbert, Dan Halsted and Richard Klubeck); National Board of Review Award for Best Directorial Debut; Online Film Critics Society Award for Best Breakthrough Filmmaker; Phoenix Film Critics Society Award for Breakout of the Year – Behind the Camera; Nominated – Empire Award for Best Newcomer; Nominated – Humanitas Prize for Sundance Film; Nominated – Independent Spirit Award for Best First Screenplay; Nominated – Online Film Critics Society Award for Best Original Screenplay; Nominated – Sundance Film Festival's Grand Jury Prize; Nominated – MTV Movie Award for Best Kiss (shared with Natalie Portman); Nominated – MTV Movie Award for Best Breakthrough Male Performance; Nominated – Online Film Critics Society Award for Best Breakthrough Performance; Nominated – Teen Choice Award for Choice Movie Actor: Drama; Nominated – Teen Choice Award for Choice Blush Scene; Nominated – Teen Choice Award for Choice Movie: Male Breakout Star; Nominated – Teen Choice Award for Choice Movie Liplock (shared with Natalie Portman); Nominated – Teen Choice Award for Choice Love Scene; Nominated – Writers Guild of America Award for Best Original Screenplay |
| 2005 | Chicken Little | Chicken Little | Voice |
| 2006 | The Last Kiss | Michael | |
| 2006 | The Ex | Tom Reilly | |
| 2010 | The High Cost of Living | Henry | |
| 2012 | The Color of Time | Albert | |
| 2013 | Oz the Great and Powerful | Frank / Finley | Voice |
| 2014 | Wish I Was Here | Aidan Bloom | Also director and writer |
| 2016 | In Dubious Battle | Connor | |
| 2017 | The Disaster Artist | Himself | |
| 2020 | Percy | Jackson | |
| 2020 | The Comeback Trail | Walter Creason | |
| 2022 | Cheaper by the Dozen | Paul Baker | |
| 2022 | Moonshot | Leon Kovi | |
| 2023 | A Little White Lie | Real Shriver | |
| 2024 | French Girl | Gordon Kinski | |
| 2026 | Clean Hands | Kevin Simmers | Also executive producer |
| 2026 | Girls Like Girls | Curtis | |

=== Television ===
| Year | Title | Role | Notes |
|---|---|---|---|
| 1989 | High | Schoolkid | Unaired CBS pilot |
| 1990 | The Baby-Sitters Club | David Cummings | Episode: "Dawn Saves the Trees" |
| 1994 | CBS Schoolbreak Special | Tony / Tammy | Episode: "My Summer as a Girl" |
| 2001–2010 | Scrubs | John "J.D." Dorian | Main role and narrator (175 episodes); Nominated – Golden Globe Award for Best Actor – Television Series Musical or Comedy (2005, 2006, 2007); Nominated – Hollywood Foreign Press Association Award for Best Performance by an Actor in a Television Series – Musical or Comedy (2005, 2006); Nominated – People's Choice Award for Favorite Male Television Star (2005); Nominated – People's Choice Award for Best Leading Star (2005); Nominated – Primetime Emmy Award for Outstanding Lead Actor in a Comedy Series (2005); Nominated – Satellite Award for Best Actor – Television Series Musical or Comedy (2005); Nominated – Teen Choice Award for Choice TV Actor: Comedy (2002, 2003, 2004, 2005, 2006) |
| 2002 | Clone High | Paul Revere / X-Stream Mike | Voice, 2 episodes |
| 2002 | It's a Very Merry Muppet Christmas Movie | Himself/John "J.D." Dorian | Television film |
| 2005–2006 | Arrested Development | Phillip Litt | Uncredited; 2 episodes |
| 2006 | Nobody's Watching | Himself | Television film |
| 2009 | Scrubs: Interns | John "J.D." Dorian | Episode: "Our Meeting with J.D." |
| 2012 | Cougar Town | Pizza Guy | Uncredited; Episode: "A One Story Town" |
| 2012 | The Exes | Chuck Feeney | Episode: "He's Gotta Have It" |
| 2014 | Community | John "J.D." Dorian | Voice, episode: "Repilot"; uncredited |
| 2014 | Inside Amy Schumer | Rob | Episode: "I'm So Bad" |
| 2015 | Undateable | Zach | 2 episodes |
| 2017 | Bill Nye Saves the World | Himself | Episode: "Earth is a Hot Mess" |
| 2017, 2020 | BoJack Horseman | Himself | Voice, 2 episodes |
| 2018 | Alex, Inc. | Alex Schuman | Main role; 10 episodes |
| 2022 | Obi-Wan Kenobi | Freck | Voice, episode: "Part III" |
| 2024 | Bad Monkey | Doctor Israel "Izzy" O'Peele | 2 episodes |
| 2024 | Bookie | Loco Rocco | Episode: "Make It Look Like an Accident" |
| 2025 | Long Story Short | Gilad | Voice, episode: "Hannah's Dance Recital" |
| 2026–present | Scrubs | John "J.D." Dorian | Lead and narrator (11 episodes); Also director (2 episodes) |

=== Video games ===
| Year | Title | Role |
|---|---|---|
| 2005 | Chicken Little | Chicken Little |
| 2005 | Kingdom Hearts II | Chicken Little |
| 2006 | Disney's Chicken Little: Ace in Action | Chicken Little |
| 2014 | Kingdom Hearts HD 2.5 Remix | Chicken Little (archive audio) |
| 2017 | Kingdom Hearts HD 1.5 + 2.5 ReMIX | Chicken Little (archive audio) |

== Theatre ==
| Year | Title | Role | Notes |
|---|---|---|---|
| 1998 | Macbeth | Fleance/Young Siward | Off-Broadway |
| 2002 | Twelfth Night | Sebastian | Off-Broadway |
| 2010 | Trust | Performer | Second Stage Theatre Production |
| 2011 | All New People | Performer | Second Stage Theatre Production |
| 2012 | All New People | Charlie | West End Premiere |
| 2014 | Bullets Over Broadway The Musical | David Shayne | Original Broadway Production |

== Filmmaking credits ==
=== Film ===
| Year | Title | Director | Producer | Writer | Notes |
|---|---|---|---|---|---|
| 1997 | Lionel on a Sunday | Yes | No | Yes | Short film |
| 2004 | Garden State | Yes | Yes | Yes | Executive soundtrack producer |
| 2010 | Positive Comment | No | Yes | No | Short film |
| 2014 | Wish I Was Here | Yes | Yes | Yes | |
| 2014 | Video Games: The Movie | No | Yes | No | Documentary; Executive producer |
| 2017 | Going in Style | Yes | No | No | |
| 2019 | In the Time It Takes to Get There | Yes | No | Yes | Short film |
| 2023 | A Good Person | Yes | Yes | Yes | |
| 2024 | The Mattachine Family | No | Yes | No | |

=== Television ===
| Year | Title | Director | Producer | Writer | Notes |
|---|---|---|---|---|---|
| 2004–2010 | Scrubs | Yes | Yes | No | Director (7 episodes); Executive producer (Season 9) |
| 2008 | Night Life | Yes | Yes | No | Television film |
| 2009 | Scrubs: Interns | No | Yes | No | Executive producer |
| 2015 | Self Promotion | Yes | No | No | Pilot for television series for MTV |
| 2018 | Alex, Inc. | Yes | Yes | No | Director (4 episodes); Executive producer (9 episodes) |
| 2020 | Ted Lasso | Yes | No | No | 1 episode Nominated – Directors Guild of America Award for Outstanding Directing – Comedy Series; Nominated – Primetime Emmy Award for Outstanding Directing for a Comedy Series |
| 2021 | Solos | Yes | No | No | 1 episode |
| 2023–present | Shrinking | Yes | No | No | 5 episodes |
| 2026 | Rooster | Yes | No | No | 2 episodes |
| 2026-present | Scrubs (2026) | Yes | Yes | No | Director (2 episodes); Executive producer |

=== Music videos ===
| Year | Title | Director | Producer | Notes |
|---|---|---|---|---|
| 2002 | Lazlo Bane: "Superman" | Yes | No | |
| 2005 | Gavin DeGraw: "Chariot" | Yes | No | |
| 2008 | Joshua Radin: "I'd Rather Be with You" - First Version | Yes | No | |

== Discography ==
| Year | Album | Notes |
|---|---|---|
| 2004 | Garden State | Compilation producer Grammy Award for Best Compilation Soundtrack Album for a Motion Picture, Television or Other Visual Media |
| 2007 | Scrubs: "My Musical" Soundtrack | |
