= Almo Sounds =

Record label

- Parent company: Universal Music Group
- Founded: 1994
- Founder: Herb Alpert, Jerry Moss
- Status: Defunct
- Distributors: Geffen (1994–1998); Interscope (1998–99)
- Genre: Various

Almo Sounds was a record label which was started in 1994 by Herb Alpert and Jerry Moss after they sold A&M Records to PolyGram. The intent for the label was to recreate the initial concept of A&M Records as a small, "boutique" label.

The label signed artists Gillian Welch, Imogen Heap, Ozomatli and Garbage and several other artists. Psychic TV did demos that were rejected for the label. Herb Alpert himself released his Second Wind, Passion Dance, and Colours albums on the label.

A Nashville division was launched in 1995. Headed by record producer Garth Fundis, it released albums by Paul Jefferson, Billy Yates, and Bekka & Billy.

The label has not released new product since 1999 and in 2000 it was sold to Universal Music Group. Commercially viable catalog albums remain available through Interscope Records, a current sister label to A&M.

== Discography ==
Albums

Year	Artist	Release	Catalogue
1995	Angel Corpus Christi	White Courtesy Phone	AMSD-80000
1995	The Rake's Progress	Altitude	AMSD-80001
1995	Peter Bruntnell	Cannibal	ALMOCD002
1995	Tim Wheater	Tim Wheater	AMSD-80003
1995	Garbage	Garbage	AMSD-80004
1996	Herb Alpert	Second Wind	AMSD-80005
1996	Gillian Welch	Revival	AMSD-80006
1996	Paul Jefferson	Paul Jefferson	AMSD-80007
1996	Gus	Gus	AMSD-80008
1996	Victor DeLorenzo	Pancake Day	AMSD-80009
1997	Lazlo Bane	11 Transistor	AMSD-80010
1997	Pulsars	Pulsars	AMSD-80011
1997	Bekka & Billy	Bekka & Billy	AMSD-80012
1997	ManBREAK	Come and See	AMSD-80013
1997	Herb Alpert	Passion Dance	AMDS-80014
1997	Peter Bruntnell	Camelot In Smithereens	ALMOCD14
1997	Billy Yates	Billy Yates	AMDS-80015
1998	Imogen Heap	iMegaphone	AMSD-80017
1998	Garbage	Version 2.0	AMSD-80018
1998	The Prissteens	Scandal, Controversy & Romance	AMSD-80019
1998	Ozomatli	Ozomatli	AMSD-80020
1998	Gillian Welch	Hell Among the Yearlings	AMSD-80021
1999	Bijou Phillips	I'd Rather Eat Glass	AMSD-80022
1999	Gus	Word of Mouth Parade	AMSD-80023
1999	Various Artists	Return of the Grievous Angel	AMSD-80024
1999	Herb Alpert	Colors	AMSD-80025

EPs

Year	Artist	Release	Catalogue
1996	Pulsars	Submission to the Master	AMSDM-88002
1996	Lazlo Bane	Short Style	AMSDM-88003

== See also ==
- List of record labels
