= Soundclash =

Studio album by Renegade Soundwave
- Released: 20 February 1990
- Recorded: 1986–1989
- Genres: Alternative dance; electronic
- Length: 55:09
- Label: Mute
- Producers: Renegade Soundwave; Flood

Renegade Soundwave chronology
Soundclash (1990)	In Dub (1990)

Singles from Soundclash
- 1. "Space Gladiator" Released: November 1989; 2. "Probably a Robbery" Released: January 1990; 3. "Biting My Nails" Released: July 1990

Soundclash is the debut album by English electronic act Renegade Soundwave, released by Mute Records in February 1990. Co-produced by the band with producer Flood, the material was recorded over several years, and displays the band's unique style of dance music, taking influences from hip hop, rock and dub music. The music incorporates breakbeats, tape loops, stalking basslines and numerous samples sourced from disparate material. The album's lyrics concern social issues, with the band aiming to write lyrics that approach issues from unusual angles.

The album was promoted by three singles, including the UK Top 40 hit "Probably a Robbery" and dancefloor hit "Biting My Nails". Upon release, the album reached number 74 on the UK Albums Chart, and remains their only charting album. Music critics noted the band's hybrid sound and disparate influences. Over time, the album has been regarded as an innovative release, and has influenced numerous electronic acts including the Chemical Brothers and Leftfield. The band followed Soundclash with the remix album In Dub later on in 1990.

== Background and production ==
Formed by multi-instrumentalists Gary Asquith, Danny Briottet (both formerly of Mass) and Carl Bonnie, Renegade Soundwave emerged on the London music scene in the late 1980s, applying the musical styles of punk rock and industrial music to electronic dance floor styles such as dub music, earning them comparisons with Meat Beat Manifesto, Cabaret Voltaire and Skinny Puppy. The band described themselves as a "by-product of punk," explaining: "It forged the way we think, though the sound is nothing to do with it." Their notorious first single, "Kray Twins" (1987), was released on Rhythm King Records and set samples of a television documentary to an underlying throbbing bass line.

Following the release of the similarly notorious "Cocaine Sex," which was released in a cocaine envelope, Renegade Soundwave switched labels to Mute Records as they appreciated the greater eclecticism present in their catalogue. Their first release on Mute was the Biting My Nails EP in 1988. Soundclash was Renegade Soundwave's debut album, and was co-produced by Renegade Soundwave and Flood. Paul Kendall engineered the sessions. Some of the songs on Soundclash date from as early as 1986, as the band spent some two years recording material for the album.

== Composition ==
Soundclash blends together different styles of dance music into the band's distinctive style of alternative dance. The album draws from British dub music, American hip hop and rock music, and incorporates tape loops, samples, clattering breakbeats, and "stalking" bass lines. Asquith's rap vocals are nasal and reminiscent of Madchester music, although writer Greg Kot wrote that the "deadpan" vocals were similar to the Pet Shop Boys. Vocals, dance breaks and guitars are employed more conventionally on "Biting My Nails" and "Probably a Robbery." The album samples from a diverse range of sources, including Queen, Tchaikovsky, Andy Williams and film soundtracks. The usage of several hip hop-oriented samples highlights the influence of golden age rap. The lyrics concern social issues; Asquith said of Soundclash: "It's adult, adult music. Our angle is not the obvious angle. It's a lot more ambiguous. A lot more open. There's a lot more ideas going into it than just one singular one. It's sort of – objectionable."

"Blue Eyed Boy" features a sample later re-used by Public Enemy on their song "By the Time I Get to Arizona." "Probably a Robbery" features a "rueful-vengeful jailbird narrative" that incorporates black humour. Musically, the song features a brass hook, singalong chorus, brittle beats and backing strings. "Murder Music" is a recording of a song Asquith wrote with Rema-Rema for their unreleased album, and samples the introductory drum beat from "The Crunge" by Led Zeppelin. The dance song "Biting My Nails", a Genevieve Waite cover, samples the chord progression and horn riff from Eddie Floyd's "Knock on Wood" (1966), and features lyrics about frustration over nightclub sets. A deconstructed cover version of Andy Williams' "Can't Get Used to Losing You", also a hit for The Beat, exemplifies the band's diverse tastes, and incorporates sinister sound effects, a pulsating bass line and a funky guitar riff reminiscent of Prince.

== Release ==
Released on 20 February 1990, Soundclash was issued via Mute Records, and reached number 74 on the UK Albums Chart, spending one week on the chart. It remains their only charting album. Original British CD copies feature "The Phantom" and "Ozone Breakdown" as bonus tracks that are unlisted besides on a sticker. The release of Soundclash was preceded by several dance floor-orientated singles. "Space Gladiator" was the album's first single; it reached number 81 on the UK Singles Chart in November 1989 and stayed on the charts for four weeks. Even more successful was second single "Probably a Robbery", which spent six weeks on the chart, peaking at number 38 in February 1990. "Biting My Nails" reached number 76 on the chart in July. Adam Higginbotham of Select described "Probably a Robbery" and "Biting My Nails" as appearing to show Renegade Soundwave "on the verge of widespread success as their aggressive sound began to reach a wider audience."

== Critical reception ==
Professional ratings
Review scores
Source	Rating
AllMusic	3/5 stars
The Chicago Tribune	2/4 stars
Sputnikmusic	4/5 stars
The Virgin Encyclopedia of Nineties Music	4/5 stars

In a contemporary review, Option magazine described Renegade Soundwave as "[p]urposely subversive" and "calculatedly audacious," and felt they created "danceable audio barrages, a pummeling sound that conveys a slick, edgy urban hipness, often spiked with a humorous tw[ist]." He felt that, despite its reliance on samples, the music is "a delicious tangle of sensory overload that manages to be cunningly original." In his review for The Chicago Tribune, Greg Kot felt that the "dance noise terrorists" create a "fashionably gloomy atmosphere for their slamming rhythms, but never approach the intensity level of truly menacing industrial beat outfits such as Ministry." In their review, CD Review described Renegade Soundwave as "an aggressive British trio that wants to attack faulty modern sensibilities and safe music by dragging you by your ear onto the dance floor." They felt that Soundclash contains impressive samples, rhythm tracks and lyrics, but felt that "some of the material occasionally feels contrived."

Among retrospective reviews, John Bush of AllMusic said the album covered a lot of territory with a "unique sound aesthetic," and wrote that it featured "a solid focus on the audio terrorism possible from sampling" despite the presence of "subpar" rapping. Tony Flecher of Trouser Press felt the album saw Renegade Soundwave suffer from "identity crisis," adding: "Unsure whether to produce rock songs, dance anthems or dub jams, they experiment with each [...] and just come across confused." Writing in 2010, Sputnikmusic Emeritus writer Iai described Soundclash as an "underground dance classic that, miraculously, still holds up." The writer felt the album "blew away the cobwebs" with its ability and willingness to "drag several different strands of dance into [its] sound, most obviously hip-hop," and complemented the band for not straying from club music territory throughout the album despite its "unusual orbit between genres." They concluded: "I can't even begin to imagine how exciting this must have sounded in 1989, at a time when British music was in the doldrums and independent labels were so far out of sight that it was easy to believe that they didn't even exist; even now, it sounds like the kind of album that could spark a movement." MusicRadar described Soundclash as a "masterpiece of genre-splicing breaks, samples and electronica."

== Legacy ==
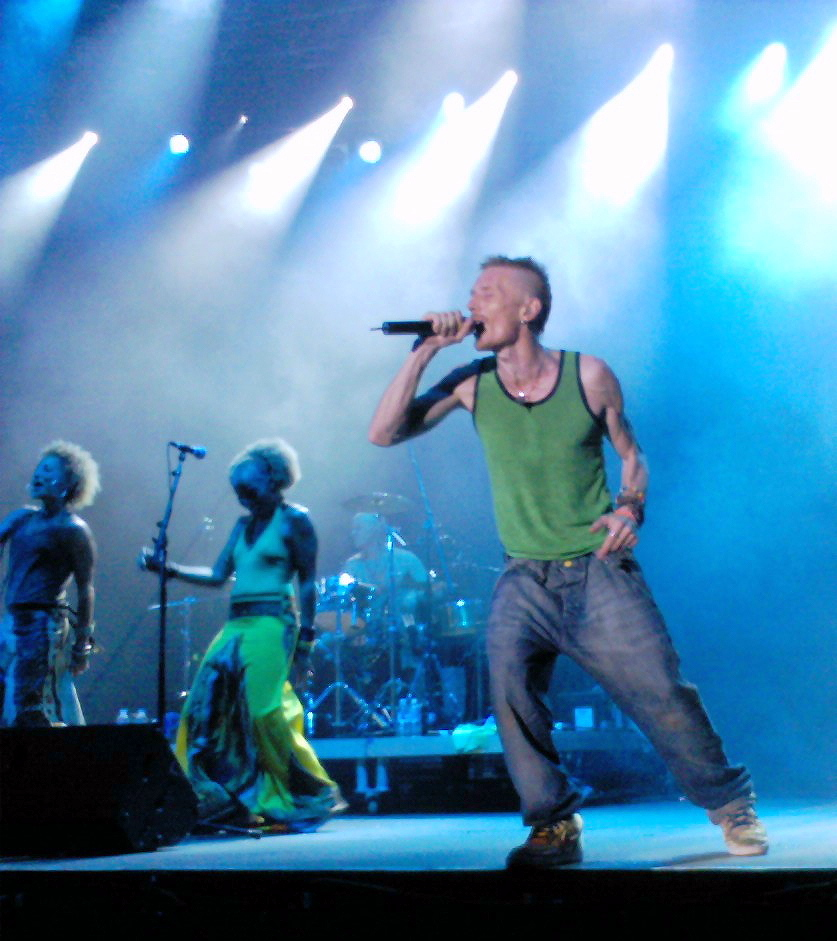
Soundclash has been credited for influencing acts such as Stereo MC's (pictured).

In 1994, Larry Flick of Billboard described Soundclash as innovative for breaking musical barriers, and noted its influence and inspiration on "so many artists and producers." He continued: "A quick stomp through almost any current rave or trance program will turn up a slew of direct descendants of 'Biting My Nails', 'Women Respond to Bass,' and 'Probably a Robbery'." Iai felt the album was influential on big beat, with The Chemical Brothers naming Renegade Soundwave as their main influence and Fatboy Slim also borrowing from the album. They also identified house act Leftfield as being influenced by the album, while crediting the album's "nasal, boozy, quasi-Madchester rapping" as a large influence on EMF and Stereo MCs. In 1999, Tom Ewing of Freaky Trigger ranked "Probably a Robbery" at number 60 in his list of the "Top 100 Singles of the 1990s." In the accompanying write-up, he wrote that Renegade Soundwave were "well ahead of their time, and not just musically. Their tough electro-dub experiments get some credit now for helping to spread the breakbeat virus through British dance music, but their crim-glam stance now seems just as prophetic." He added of the song:

""Probably A Robbery"'s rueful-vengeful jailbird narrative is as sharp as you’d expect but it also catches the thick, black humour that runs through a lot of British crime narratives – just as that title indicates, it’s as much a comedy record as a dance one. It’s also, while completely atypical, RSW’s best commercial shot, with a chantalong chorus and keystone-cops brass hook to sugar the swaggering, brittle beats and background string lurches. It hit the Top 40 at the low end in 1990 and stood out a mile, totally out of step with the times. Now its rolling, easy arrogance sums up this cocksure decade as certainly as anything else you could mention."

In comparing Soundclash to the music of the Clash, writer Chris Knowles described Soundclash as a "landmark album" and felt it was "squarely in the mold of a tightly focused Sandinista!," similarly to Meat Beat Manifesto's Satyricon (1992). Renegade Soundwave followed Soundclash with a "stripped back dub" remix album entitled In Dub (1990), which contained remixes of several songs from the former album, including "Pocket Porn", "Traitor" and "Blue Eyed Boy." In a 2006 interview, Asquith named both Soundclash and In Dub as the albums of which he is most proud of, and expressed an interest in remixing Soundclash with Briottet.

== Track listing ==
All songs written by Renegade Soundwave except where noted.

1. "Blue Eyed Boy" – 4:30
2. "Lucky Luke" – 3:52
3. "On TV" – 2:26
4. "Probably a Robbery" – 4:09
5. "Traitor" – 3:55
6. "Space Gladiator" – 4:36
7. "Murder Music" – 2:35
8. "Biting My Nails" (Renegade Soundwave, Geneviève Waïte) – 3:54
9. "Pocket Porn" – 3:45
10. "Can't Get Used to Losing You" (Doc Pomus, Mort Shuman) – 4:32
11. "Biting My Nails" (Instrumental) – 5:22

=== CD bonus tracks ===
1. "The Phantom" – 4:47
2. "Ozone Breakdown" – 6:46

== Personnel ==
- Renegade Soundwave – production, writing
- Flood – production
- Paul Kendall – engineer
