= Le Coq Musique =

British record label

- Company type: Independent Record Label
- Industry: Entertainment
- Founder: Kevin Mooney of Adam and the Ants; Gary Asquith of Renegade Soundwave
- Headquarters: London, England
- Key people: Kevin Mooney (Director); Gary Asquith (Director); Lee Jason Simeone (Artist / Production Assistant)
- Products: CD, Vinyl Records, Digital Downloads
- Website: lecoqmusique.fr

Le Coq Musique is an English independent record label based in London, which was founded in 1998.

== Company history ==
This English independent record label was established in 1998, by co-founders Kevin Mooney from the band Adam and the Ants and Gary Asquith of Renegade Soundwave. The labels releases have featured Adam Ant, Rammellzee, The Lavender Pill Mob (featuring Mooney, Asquith and Andrew Gray of The Wolfgang Press). Solo artists who appear on Le Coq Musique; Ron Strykert (ex-Men at Work) and Simeone. As of 2011, the label have a new catalogue of releases and have started to issue digital downloads from their back catalogue.

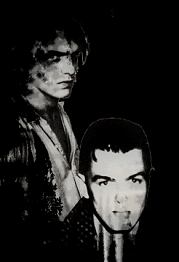
Label founders Kevin Mooney & Gary Asquith, circa 1986.

== Discography ==
- The Lavender Pill Mob – Mikes Bikes CD & MP3 (2003) Adam Ant, Kevin Mooney, Gary Asquith of Renegade Soundwave and Mass, Rema Rema, The Mekon
- The Lavender Pill Mob – The Lavender Pill Mob CD & MP3 (2004) Kevin Mooney, Gary Asquith, Rammellzee, Tokyo Monsters, Zoltar The Magnificent
- Dragon Bass – Cragon Bass 12" EP / CD (2004) Gary Asquith, Drostan Madden
- Tranquil Trucking Company – Tranquil Trucking Company 12" EP (2003) Gary Asquith
- Ron Strykert – Paradise CD (2009) Ron Strykert
- Simeone – The Dream Weaver CD & MP3 (2009) Lee Simeone, Kevin Mooney
- Simeone – An Introduction To CD & MP3 (2011) Lee Simeone, Kevin Mooney, Gary Asquith, Karel Fialka, Alan Rear (New Musik / Search Party / Miguel Bosé)
