= Lee Jason Simeone =

English musician (born 1980)

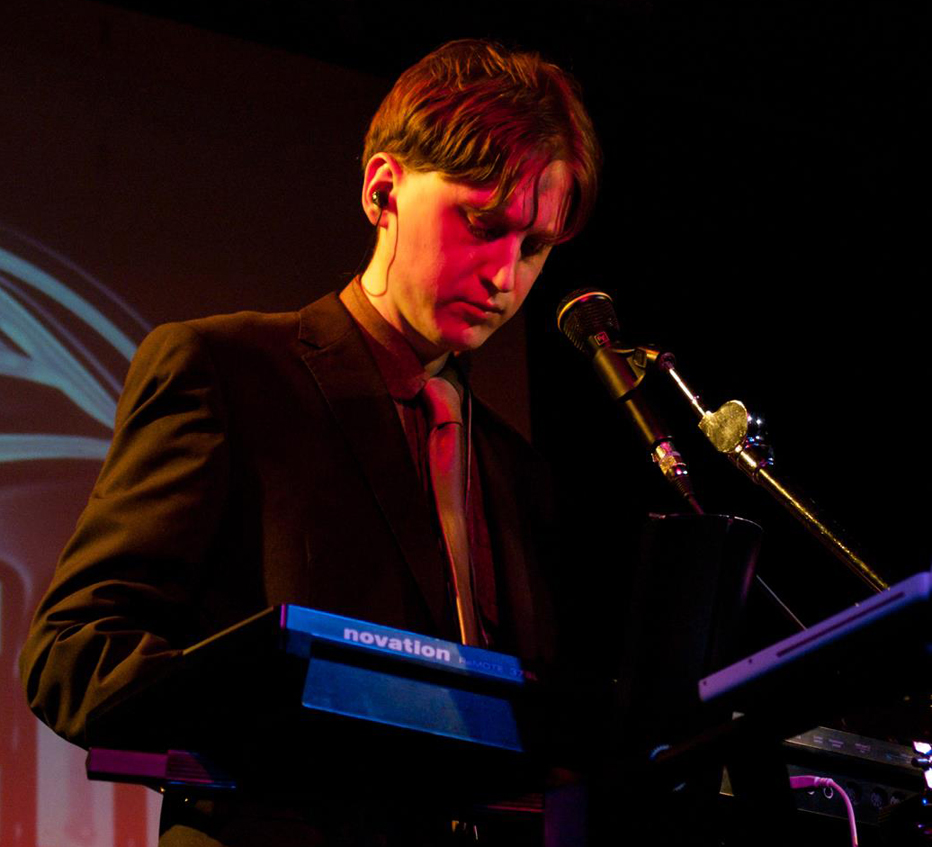
- Simeone performing in 2012

Background information
- Born: 20 March 1980 (age 46); Rochford, Essex, England
- Genres: Electronic; pop; dark wave
- Occupations: Multi-instrumentalist; singer-songwriter; record producer
- Instruments: Vocals; keyboards; drums; guita; harmonica
- Years active: 2002–present
- Labels: Sony Music; Le Coq Musique; Vernal Equinox
- Website: simeone.rf.gd

Lee Jason Simeone (born 20 March 1980 in Rochford, Essex, England) is an English musician, who joined the independent record label Le Coq Musique in 2008. Other artists of the label include Kevin Mooney of Adam and the Ants, Gary Asquith of Renegade Soundwave.

== Solo career ==
Simeone released his debut album The Dream Weaver on the Le Coq Musique label in 2010. The album won rave reviews from Rough Trade Records and Future Music. The album also featured Kevin Mooney of Adam and The Ants on bass for one track titled "Epica".

== Productions and collaborations ==
Simeone's career as a freelance producer/performer had begun when collaborating with various popular artists in 2010, most notably: the electro-pop pioneer Karel Fialka, Kevin Mooney, Paul Reynolds (ex-A Flock of Seagulls), Gary Asquith of Renegade Soundwave, and Alan Rear (Tony Mansfield, Miguel Bosé).

Mooney, Asquith and Fialka featured on Simeone's 2011 release An Introduction to Simeone. A further collaboration with Fialka was to follow where Simeone guesting on drums and backing vocals for his live shows between 2010 and 2011. Simeone's 2016 offering Best Seat in the Dream EP contains six new tracks and featured guest artists namely; former original Cockney Rebel bandmate Milton-Reame James. Simeone has also appeared in an episode of Ashes to Ashes alongside Steve Strange.

In mid 2014, Simeone made a contribution towards production and mastering duties on the Australian rock band Men at Work's Still Life EP, released the same year via Sony/ATV. He also recorded and performed a song for it titled "Star Lane". It came with a remastered vinyl reissue of their 1983 album Cargo. Its A-side also featured the original band album recording of "Blue for You", remastered from the original masters at Abbey Road Studios, with mastering engineer Simon Gibson. The EP also featured an interview that Simeone hosted with the original band member Ron Strykert.

In 2015, Simeone became the executive producer for the award winning documentary film You Better Take Cover. A film about Men at Work, their hit single "Down Under", and the "Kookaburra" controversy. You Better Take Cover won best documentary short at the Melbourne International Film Festival (2016) and winning again at the St Kilda Short Film Festival. A further premiere screening at the Manchester International Festival (2016) was met with rave reviews.

Simeone produced the You Better Take Cover soundtrack album at Abbey Road Studios released via PledgeMusic in 2018 as a tribute to Greg Ham. It successfully reached 105% of its funding goal. The album featured collaborations with three original band members of Men at Work. Simeone composed two original songs for the album and produced a cover version of Ham's "Still Life" from the 1985 album, Two Hearts. You Better Take Cover OST also featured band interviews and material that Ham had worked on before his death in 2012. A percentage of the albums sales were donated to Ham's chosen charity; Turning Point Alcohol and Drug Centre.

Lee formed a tribute band The DNA performing authentic covers of A Flock of Seagulls songs. A live video was recorded in 2025 gaining over three million YouTube streams in under three months.

== Charity work ==
Lee was a former member of staff at Rock 'n' Roll Rescue in Parkway, Camden. The aim of this shop is to support the local food banks and mental health charities. The music charity shop is owned by Knox, founder member of the punk group the Vibrators

Simeone is a member of Neurofibromatosis Inc. (a nonprofit organisation working towards Neurofibromatosis patient support) and supports the charity by making donations from his releases. He is also involved with supporting the Depression Alliance and Turning Point.

== Discography ==
The Dream Weaver (features guest musicians: Karel Fialka and Kevin Mooney)

- Released: 24 August 2009
- Format: CD / MP3 / FLAC
- Label: Le Coq Musique (2009)
- Writer: Lee Simeone
- Producer: Lee Simeone
- Tracks: Six

An Introduction to Simeone (features guest musicians: Gary Asquith, Kevin Mooney and Karel Fialka)

- Released: 13 June 2011
- Format: CD
- Label: Le Coq Musique
- Writer: Lee Simeone
- Producer: Lee Simeone
- Tracks: 21
- Singles: Translucent Track

Men at Work Still Life EP (features guest appearance: Ron Strykert)

- Released: 27 September 2014
- Format: 12" blue / splattered vinyl
- Label: Sony Music Entertainment
- Writer: Colin Hay, Lee Simeone
- Producer: Peter McIan, Lee Simeone
- Tracks: Three

Men at Work You Better Take Cover (OST) (official soundtrack to the 2015 documentary short of the same name)

- Released: 19 April 2018
- Format: CD
- Label: Vernal Equinox Records Ltd. via PledgeMusic
- Writer: Ham, Hay, Strykert, Simeone, Williams, Fox, Scealy, Lowe, Mulry, Phillips
- Producer: Lee Simeone
- Tracks: 15 and four video tracks on bonus disc

Best Seat in the Dream (CD version features guest musician: Milton Reame-James, ex-Cockney Rebel)

- Released: 24 May 2019
- Format: Digital / CD
- Label: Vernal Equinox Records Ltd.
- Writer: Lee Simeone (alias: Future Synth-Smith)
- Producer: Lee Simeone
- Tracks: Five

Before the Internet (features artwork by Charlotte Rainger-Dingle)

- Released: 31 December 2022
- Format: Digital / CD
- Label: Music LCD
- Writer: Lee Simeone (alias: Future Synth-Smith)
- Producer: Lee Simeone
- Tracks: 10

The DNA (Live) (features artwork by Charlotte Rainger-Dingle)

- Released: 9 February 2026
- Format: Digital / CD
- Label: Music LCD
- Writer: A Flock of Seagulls
- Producer: Lee Simeone
- Tracks: 10

Year	Title	Role	Production company
2008	Ashes to Ashes	Dancer	BBC
2015	You Better Take Cover	Executive Producer	Vernal Equinox Records Ltd.
