= Man on the Moon (musical) =

Man On The Moon
- Original Ad Illustrated by Andy Warhol
- Music: John Phillips
- Lyrics: John Phillips
- Book: John Phillips
- Productions: 1975 Little Theatre, New York

Man on the Moon is a 1975 musical written by John Phillips of the Mamas & The Papas and directed by Paul Morrissey. It was produced by Andy Warhol with Richard Turley. The production opened at the Little Theatre in New York City on January 29, 1975, following an extended preview run, and closed after two performances.

The musical follows an American astronaut who leads a mission of interplanetary dignitaries to prevent the destruction of the universe by a bomb planted on the Moon by an evil scientist.

In 2009, a cast album was released through Varèse Sarabande.

== Background ==
Soon after completing work on his debut album John, the Wolf King of L.A., musician John Phillips came up with the idea for a space-themed musical project, inspired by his viewing of the July 1969 TV broadcast of the Apollo 11 Moon landing. The initial title for the project was simply Space. Phillips worked on a script and wrote songs for Space over two years with his wife Geneviève Waïte. Phillips envisioned that the lead role of the astronaut would be played by either Elvis Presley or Ricky Nelson, both of whom he was friendly with.

Initial funding for the project came from producer Michael Butler, who had brought the stage musical Hair to Broadway. Butler hired a young director called Michael Bennett to work on the project, but he and Phillips did not gel and Bennett resigned during dress rehearsals for the production at the Aquarius Theater in Los Angeles. Phillips then attempted to generate interest in a film version of the book with the help of real estate heir Leonard Holzer, producer of the Rolling Stones documentary, Gimme Shelter and the former husband of Warhol superstar Baby Jane Holzer. Holzer took the project to Ray Stark, producer of Funny Girl, who brought the script to the attention of Barbra Streisand, while Holzer tried to hook Jack Nicholson for the male lead. In 1972, Phillips also got a copy of the script to director George Lucas through his daughter Mackenzie Phillips, who was one of the stars of Lucas's film American Graffiti. Phillips would later maintain that Lucas got the idea to make Star Wars from Space.

When financing for the film seemed to be going nowhere, Phillips and Waïte relocated to New York with the intent to raise money. They performed the songs to potential backers as part of their pitch. Waite managed to persuade pop artist Andy Warhol to come on board as a producer. Warhol was responsible for the sets, but attorney Richard Turley, another producer, was in charge of the production's business side. Warhol's film collaborator Paul Morrissey signed on as director of the production, which was then renamed Man on the Moon. Rehearsals took place at Andy Warhol's Factory. Morrissey, concerned about the script, hired Michael O'Donoghue to rewrite much of the dialogue, though these revisions were ultimately not used.

== Plot ==
Set on Earth, the Moon, and Canis Minor, the story revolves around the evil scientist Dr. Bomb, head of the United States space program, who plans to blow up the Moon. He is aided by the diminutive Leroy, a "part-man and part big-red box" human bomb.

== Musical numbers ==
Scene 1 – EARTH

- "Prologue" – Dr Bomb
- "Boys from the South" – Ernie
- "Midnight Deadline Blastoff" – Ernie
- "Mission Control" – Dr. Bomb, Ernie, Leroy, President, Miss America
- "Speed of Light" – Ernie, Leroy

Scene 2 – CANIS MINOR

- "Though I'm a Little Angel" – Angel
- "Girls" – King Can, Venus, Angel
- "Canis Minor Bolero Waltz" – Angel
- "Starburst" – Angel
- "Penthouse of Your Mind" – King Can
- "Champagne and Kisses" – Venus
- "Star Stepping Stranger/Convent" – Ernie, Angel
- "My Name Is Can" – King Can
- "American Man on the Moon" – Angel

Scene 3 – THE MOON

- "Welcome to the Moon" – Company
- "Sunny, Sunny Moon" – Venus, Dr. Bomb
- "Love is Coming Back" – Angel, Ernie
- "Truth Cannot Be Treason" – Leroy
- "Place in Space" – Ernie, Angel

Scene 4 – EARTH

- "Family of Man" – Dr. Bomb
- "Yesterday I Left the Earth" – Company
- "Stepping to the Stars" – Company

== Characters and original cast ==
- Dr. Bomb – Harlan S Foss
- Ernie Hardy – Eric Lang
- Leroy (Little Red Box) – Mark Lawhead
- President and King Can – Denny Doherty (as Dennis Doherty)
- Angel – Geneviève Waïte
- Venus – Monique van Vooren

Celestial Choir

- Mercury and Miss America – Brenda Bergman
- Mars – John Patrick Sundine
- Neptune – Jennifer Elder
- Pluto – E. Lynn Nickerson
- Saturn – Jeanette Chastonay

== Production ==
The production began previews at the Little Theatre in New York City on December 27, 1974, and opened on January 29, 1975. Among the celebrities attending opening night were Warren Beatty, Michelle Phillips, Diane von Furstenberg, Pat Ast, and Sylvia Miles. Following negative opening-night reviews, the musical closed on February 1, 1975, after 21 preview performances and 5 regular performances.

The original cast and preview performances featured Denny Doherty as Dr. Bomb and John Phillips as King Can. Two weeks before opening, Phillips left the production and was replaced by Doherty, his former bandmate in the Mamas & the Papas, while Harlan Foss assumed the role of Dr. Bomb.

== Reception ==
Man on the Moon opened to mostly negative reviews with Douglas Watt of the Daily News calling it a "kiddie musical" and likening it to a "sort of low-budget 'Via Galactica' that seemed to be aimed at grownups."

Emory Lewis of The Record noted that it had a "certain old-fashioned charm. The major problem with this new-old musical is that it can not make up its mind which era it wants to be in. It is best when it is a nostalgic salute to show business of the 1930s. It is weakest when it concentrates on more recent experiments into space."

Newsday critic Allan Wallack called the musical a "conspiracy against the audience." He added, "'Man on the Moon' is the kind of show that ought to be reviewed on the obit page. It simply hurls its dumbness at the audience in Kamikaze waves for an hour and a half, as though it had a built-in death wish."

The New York Times critic Clive Barnes wrote: "For connoisseurs of the truly bad, Man on the Moon may be a small milestone." He was especially scathing of Warhol's participation in the production. "Mr. Warhol's artistic practice – if I have caught his drift alright – is to produce works of art so inept that their ineptitude becomes their value," he said.

In an article for New York Magazine, John Simon criticized the musical, calling it "a crashing, campy, lobotomized bore from beginning to end, with not even a decent song in it." "Isn't it pathetic that the chic crowd of New York pours in by the limousine-load for a piece of junk offered by Andy Warhol, but would let a legitimate opening (other than something British or involving big names) go by unnoticed and unsupported?" he added.

== Soundtrack ==
Phillips recorded demo versions of many of these songs, which were issued for the first time on a 2009 CD entitled Andy Warhol Presents Man on the Moon released by Varèse Sarabande as part of the John Phillips Presents series of CDs. It contains 22 previously unreleased recordings of song demos from the musical recorded by Phillips, along with 6 songs taken from a recording made by Andy Warhol himself at one of the dress rehearsals for Man on the Moon. A multimedia portion of the CD also includes an early script for Space, photos taken of the production and backstage as well as photos of the star-studded opening night party at NYC theatre hangout Sardi's and footage of two songs taken from a video of an early rehearsal of the show.

Some songs were recorded by Geneviève Waïte for her 1974 album Romance Is on the Rise (namely, "Girls", "American Man on the Moon" and "Love is Coming Back". Versions of "Star Stepping Stranger", "Penthouse of Your Mind" and "Yesterday I Left the Earth" appear on the 2007 CD Jack of Diamonds.
