= Mike Sarne =

British actor, writer, producer and director

- Born: Michael Scheuer; 6 August 1940 (age 86); Paddington, London, England
- Education: University College London
- Occupations: Actor, writer, film director, singer
- Years active: 1960–
- Notable work: Come Outside; Joanna (director); Myra Breckinridge (director)

Michael Sarne (born Michael Scheuer; 6 August 1940) is a British actor, singer, writer, producer and director, who also had a brief career as a pop singer in the 1960s. Sarne directed the films Joanna (1968) and Myra Breckinridge (1970). He has appeared as an actor in several films including A Place to Go (1965), Two Weeks in September (1967), and Moonlighting (1982).

== Music career ==
Sarne was born Michael Scheuer at St Mary's Hospital, Paddington, London. He is of Czechoslovak descent. Active in the 1960s as a singer, he is best known for his 1962 UK novelty chart topper, "Come Outside" (produced by Charles Blackwell), which featured vocal interjections by Wendy Richard. He had three more releases which made the UK Singles chart: "Will I What?", in 1962, which featured Billie Davis; "Just for Kicks", in 1963; and "Code of Love", also in 1963.

== TV and film career ==
In the mid-1960s Sarne introduced the ITV children's quiz series Junior Criss Cross Quiz.

As an actor, he has appeared on television, in British series including The Avengers, Man in a Suitcase, Jonathan Creek and The Bill. Sarne also appeared in an episode of Minder as Billy Beesley, an amateur safe blower. His film credits include a starring role in the 1963 film A Place to Go with Rita Tushingham, directed by Basil Dearden, and he also appeared in Invasion Quartet (1961), Every Day's a Holiday (1965), Two Weeks in September (1967), Moonlighting (1982) and Success Is the Best Revenge (1984) for Polish director Jerzy Skolimowski and the Hercule Poirot film Appointment with Death (1988). He also played an SS captain in the TV miniseries War and Remembrance (1988). He later appeared in The Fourth Angel (2001), as Valery in the crime thriller Eastern Promises (2007), as a stage manager in Telstar: The Joe Meek Story (2008), and in 2011 he was the voice of Karla in the spy film Tinker Tailor Soldier Spy. In 2012, he played Father Mabeuf in the film of Les Misérables. In 2013, he was 'Publican No 5' in the British comedy film The World's End.

Films he has directed include Joanna (1968) and Myra Breckinridge (1970), an adaptation of Gore Vidal's book of the same name, starring Raquel Welch, Rex Reed, Mae West, with Farrah Fawcett and Tom Selleck in roles early in their careers. Joanna broke even at the box office, but Myra Breckinridge was a major box-office flop and drew such critical hostility that his career never recovered. A more recent film is The Punk and the Princess (1994), an adaptation of Gideon Sams' young adult novel The Punk, about the romance between a teenage punk rocker and a Sloane Ranger girl. He also directed a documentary about the Glastonbury Music Festival in 1995.

== Personal life ==
He attended the School of Slavonic and East European Studies at University College London, earning a BA. Sarne had a relationship with Brigitte Bardot only a few days after her honeymoon with Gunter Sachs. He has five children – two from his 1969–1978 marriage to Tanya Sarne, founder of the designer label Ghost; and three with second wife Anne Musso, whom he married in 2004 in Chelsea, London.

Sarne had an affair with Genevieve Waite, while directing her in his 1968 film Joanna. He was physically violent towards her during filming; in a 1968 interview with New York Magazine he said of hitting Waïte that it was "the only way to direct this girl, otherwise she's very cheeky. She has to be shown. I mean she knew that unless she behaved herself she'd get slapped down. One is polite to girls so long as they behave themselves" and that he "didn't punch her around as corrective punishment. Only when she annoyed me".

== See also ==
- List of artists who reached number one on the UK Singles Chart
- List of number-one singles from the 1960s (UK)
