= David Andrews (director) =

British actor and director (1935–2026)

- Born: 22 October 1935; Sanderstead, Surrey, England
- Died: January 2026 (aged 90)
- Occupations: Television director; actor; writer
- Years active: 1959–2026
- Children: 5

David Andrews (22 October 1935 – January 2026) was a British television character actor, director and writer. From 1959, he worked almost continuously in television for more than 50 years, 40 of which were spent directing television drama and other genres.

== Early life ==
Born in Sanderstead, Surrey, England of Scottish and Irish descent, Andrews spent his early childhood in Scotland. He was educated at Kings College, Taunton and the Whitgift Middle School, Croydon (now the Trinity School of John Whitgift). In 1958, after National Service in the RAF, he graduated from the Central (now the Royal Central) School of Speech and Drama, winning the gold medal and Rawlings Cup.

== Career ==
David Andrews was originally an actor and had considerable success on television throughout the 1960s. He also appeared on the West End stage, on film and on radio. Offered a place on the BBC's television training course he became a full-time television director in the early 1970s. After graduating from drama school, he was invited by George Devine to join the English Stage Company at the Royal Court Theatre in London, taking part in an actors’ workshop to study Sanford Meisner's improvisation technique under Anthony Page. That led to his first West End part in the historic Willis Hall play, The Long and the Short and the Tall. There followed several more West End roles and the beginning of his television career.

As an actor Andrews starred or featured in dozens of plays, drama series and serials both for BBC and ITV, most notably Z-Cars, The Avengers, Armchair Theatre, Play of the Week, The Sunday Play and Play of the Month. He was often heard in leading roles on BBC radio drama and appeared in several movies, starring in two: ‘Some People’ with Kenneth More and David Hemmings and A Place to Go with Mike Sarne, Rita Tushingham and Bernard Lee. His last starring television appearance was as Honore de St Just, in Danton, with Anthony Hopkins, directed by Stuart Burge for the BBC. Andrews worked with many distinguished directors and actors of his time, and several of his personal friends in the profession became knights and dames of the realm.

His work with Anthony Page at the Royal Court inspired him to become a director and whenever appropriate he applied Page's teaching to his own work. Under the supervision of John Huntley and Michael Balcon, he wrote the screenplay and co-directed, with his then wife Tamara Hinchco, a film for the British Film Institute based on a John Arden one-act play. That led to an offer by John McGrath to write the screenplay and direct a 35mm film for BBC 2 based on a novella by Michael Hastings. Eventually he was offered a place on the BBC Television Directors’ Training Course by Sydney Newman Newman, then BBC TV's Head of Drama.

Andrews' first job as a television director was on the BBC's Thirty Minute Theatre anthology play series and later on The Revenue Men series for BBC Scotland. The legendary Dr Finlay's Casebook series which was also for BBC Scotland (and in which he had appeared as an actor), followed. At Yorkshire Television he directed the Gazette series then went to Granada Television to direct a play in the Murder anthology play series.

In 1972, Andrews joined the Central Office of Information where he directed documentaries for the Police, Prison and Fire Services. He produced promotional films for the Departments of Employment, Energy and Transport but his main portfolio consisted of recruiting commercials for the Army and Army Aviation, the Royal Navy and the Royal Air Force. That was followed by a year directing the AfterNoon magazine programme for Thames Television.

In 1978 he became a Senior Producer-Director on the staff of Scottish Television where he directed about 170 episodes of “Take the High Road”. He also directed the network drama series Charles Endell Esq. and Skin Deep, the award-winning play Extras, the Preview and Dramarama anthology play series and the award-winning 6-part serial for children, Stookie. He made a number of other prime time dramas for STV and many educational, news, current affairs, music and local programmes and programmes for the fast-growing Gaelic audience.

Leaving STV in 1990 Andrews returned to freelance work directing the drama series Jupiter Moon (BSB), Families (Granada) and Grange Hill, EastEnders, River City and Strathblair (BBC). He was also flagship director on The Biz, a six part BBC serial for "kidults". In 1996 he joined Mersey Television as a Senior Director and Depute Producer, directing 220 episodes of Hollyoaks, 30 episodes of the new Grange Hill and producing 30 episodes of Brookside. He resigned from Mersey TV in 2006 after Phil Redmond sold it to All3Media.

Later living in Scotland, Andrews continued working as a writer, doing voice-overs and taking cameo roles on television. Better known in Scotland as Davy Andrews, he was also a singer and headed a traditional band, HAZY DAYS (& Nights!) in Glasgow.

== Personal life and death ==
Andrews was married and divorced twice, first to actress and theatre director Tamara Hinchco, with whom he had a daughter and a son, and then to Anne Vels, with whom he had three children. Andrews died in January 2026, at the age of 90.
