= Kevin Mooney =

English-Irish musician (born 1962)

- Born: 5 May 1962 (age 64); Greenwich, London, England
- Genres: Rock; pop; punk; electronic
- Instruments: Bass; guitar
- Years active: 1980–present
- Labels: RCA; Chrysalis; ZTT; Le Coq Musique
- Spouse: Pamela Rooke (m. 1981; div. 1984)

Kevin Paul Mooney (born 5 May 1962) is an English-Irish punk rock-post-punk bassist and guitarist who has worked with Adam Ant, Sinéad O'Connor, and others.

== Career ==
Born in the Greenwich area of London, Mooney began his musical career in 1977 with the English-Irish punk band The European Cowards, in collaboration with John Keogh and rebel rouser John Herlihy. He was then enlisted as the bass player for Adam and the Ants, between 1980 and 1981, appearing on the album Kings of the Wild Frontier. After leaving the band because of personal conflict and creative differences, he formed the band Wide Boy Awake with best friend John Keogh, Harley Price and Horace Carter Allan. Wide Boy Awake released two EPs in the UK, including songs "Chicken Outlaw", "Billy Hyena", "Bona Venture" and "Slang Teacher", some of which appear on 1980s various-artists compilations. The band were managed by Mooney's then-wife Pamela Rooke. "Billy Hyena" was accompanied by a music video directed by Derek Jarman. Wide Boy Awake disbanded soon after without releasing a full album. During this period, Mooney guested on Sinéad O'Connor's album The Lion and the Cobra, writing and playing guitar on one track "Just Call Me Joe", featuring Leslie Winer on backing vocals.

Next, Mooney formed the band Max (not to be confused with the Japanese vocal group MAX) with Leslie Winer, a former associate of William S. Burroughs, plus John Keogh, Kumar Desai, John Wright, Nik Corfield and Bob Thompson. The group recorded an unreleased album, featuring guitar work by Mooney's former Adam and the Ants bandmate, Marco Pirroni. Mooney formed a new version of Max, which released a drug-induced soft rock middle-of-the-road album called Silence Running, produced by Trevor Horn, but the band dissolved in the wake of money problems and drug-related deaths. Mooney relocated to Florida and then to Boston with Winer but returned to the UK briefly in 2001. He now resides in Berlin.

Mooney worked with Leslie Winer as part of the electronic group "C" on the albums Witch and Spider.

In the early 2000s, Mooney formed another group, the Lavender Pill Mob, led by Gary Asquith, a former member of Rema Rema, Mass and Renegade Soundwave, with Harley Price and Lee Jason Simeone. This group recorded two albums (The Lavender Pill Mob and Mike's Bikes) released independently; the second album featured guest vocals by Adam Ant on one song, "Black Pirates" (a reworking of "Chicken Outlaw").

Preceded by Leigh Gorman	Adam and the Ants bassist 1980 - 1981	Succeeded by Gary Tibbs
