= Joel Lieber =

American novelist

Joel Lieber (died May 3, 1971, age 35) was an American writer whose novel Move! was adapted into a 1970 film starring Elliott Gould, Paula Prentiss and Geneviève Waïte, and directed by Stuart Rosenberg; Lieber wrote the screenplay with Stan Hart.

Born in New York City, Lieber attended DeWitt Clinton High School and Hobart College. He was the author of five novels, numerous reviews and essays for publications such as The New York Times, The Nation, and the Saturday Review, and a Frommer's travel guide, Israel and the Holy Land on $5 and $10 a Day, which grew out of a year that Lieber spent living in Israel.

Lieber fell from his apartment on the Upper West Side on May 3, 1971. According to the NYPD, he left two notes; the death was ruled a suicide. His final novel, Two-Way Traffic, was published posthumously and seen as semi-autobiographical. The New York Times called it "a sad and bitter novel [that] traces the road back from a crack‐up of Jesse Jacobi, who is, like Lieber, a successful novelist." Kirkus Reviews wrote, "One reads this with the literal discomfiture generated by Sylvia Plath's The Glass Bell [sic]—as the late Joel Lieber who appears here as Jesse says—'I am watching a movie of my own life disappearing.'…This is a sad extension of those earlier quixotic and prophetic novels but Lieber's last book is also his strongest showing up everywhere a ravelled urgency and a frenetically slackening lien on reality." In Namedropping: Mostly Literary Memoirs, Richard Elman claimed that Lieber "was the victim of 'cruel advice,' not from me, but from others to whom I inadvertently introduced him," including a psychiatrist to whom Elman's own psychiatrist referred him.

== Works ==
=== Novels ===
- How the Fishes Live (1967)
- Move! (1968)
- The Chair (1969)
- The Circle Game (1970)
- Two-Way Traffic: A Journal (1972)

=== Nonfiction ===
- Israel and the Holy Land on $5 and $10 a Day (1968)
