= Myra Breckinridge (film) =

1970 film by Mike Sarne

- Theatrical release poster
- Directed by: Michael Sarne
- Written by: Michael Sarne; David Giler
- Based on: Myra Breckinridge by Gore Vidal
- Produced by: David Giler; Robert Fryer
- Starring: Mae West; John Huston; Raquel Welch; Rex Reed; Farrah Fawcett; Roger Herren; Calvin Lockhart; John Carradine
- Cinematography: Richard Moore
- Edited by: Danford B. Greene
- Music by: John Phillips
- Production company: 20th Century Fox
- Distributed by: 20th Century Fox
- Release date: June 24, 1970
- Running time: 94 minutes
- Country: United States
- Language: English
- Budget: $5 million
- Box office: $4 million (US/Canada)

Myra Breckinridge is a 1970 American comedy film based on Gore Vidal's 1968 novel of the same name. The film was directed by Michael Sarne, and featured Raquel Welch in the title role. It also starred John Huston as Buck Loner, Mae West as Leticia Van Allen, Farrah Fawcett, Rex Reed, Roger Herren, and Roger C. Carmel. Tom Selleck made his film debut in a small role as one of Leticia's "studs", and Dan Hedaya has his first uncredited appearance as a hospital patient. Theadora Van Runkle was costume designer for the film, though Edith Head designed West's costumes.

Like the novel, the picture follows the exploits of Myra Breckinridge, a transgender woman who has undergone a sex change operation. Claiming to be her own widow, she manipulates her uncle Buck into giving her a position at his acting school, where she attempts to usurp Hollywood's social order by introducing femdom into the curriculum.

The picture was controversial for its sexual explicitness (including acts like female-on-male rape), but unlike the novel, it received little to no critical praise and has been cited as one of the worst films ever made. In subsequent decades, the film has developed a cult following.

== Plot ==
Myron Breckinridge flies to Copenhagen to get a sex change, becoming the beautiful Myra. Returning to America, Myra goes to her uncle Buck Loner's acting school, where she pretends to be her own widow and claims that it was Myron's will that she receive half the school, or $500,000; when Loner demurs, she asks that she be given a teaching job there to provide for herself. Buck reluctantly agrees, while launching an investigation into the veracity of Myra's claims.

Although she is ostensibly assigned an etiquette class, Myra instead philosophizes about the semiotics of the Golden Age of Hollywood while also introducing concepts of femdom into the curriculum. In debates with Myron—who physically manifests to Myra to discuss their plan—it is revealed that Myra has come to the academy with the intention of "the destruction of the last vestigial traces of traditional manhood in the race in order to realign the sexes, thus reducing population while increasing human happiness and preparing for its next stage.”

On campus, Myra becomes obsessed with a pair of young lovers named Rusty Godowski and Mary Ann Pringle, whom she believes embody all the traits of American gender norms. One night, on the pretext of arranging for him to undergo a physical exam, Myra ties Rusty to a table and rapes him with a strap on. The sexual assault causes Rusty to abandon Mary Ann. Myra uses the pair's breakup to move in on Mary Ann herself, encouraging her to experiment with bisexuality. Myra's pursuit of Rusty and Mary Ann is paralleled with the life of Leticia van Allen, a female casting agent who habitually seduces the young men who come to her for auditions. Leticia and Myra briefly cross paths when Leticia comes to the school scouting for talent. Following her assault of Rusty, Myra sends him to Leticia, who claims Rusty as her own lover.

Buck continues his investigation, ultimately uncovering evidence that Myron never died and that no death certificate exists for him. Confronted with the truth, Myra admits to the truth and strips naked before a horrified Buck, revealing the scars from her vaginoplasty.

Myra continues her pursuit of Mary Ann, who turns her down, telling her that she wishes she were a man. The next day, the manifestation of Myron—claiming that Myra has become too ambitious—runs her down in a car.

Myron awakens in the hospital from the beginning of the film, where it's indicated he has been admitted for a car accident, not gender affirmation; his nurse is Mary Ann. Looking at his bedside table, Myron sees a magazine featuring an article on Raquel Welch.

== Cast ==
- Raquel Welch as Myra Breckinridge
  - Rex Reed as Myron Breckinridge
- John Huston as Buck Loner
- Mae West as Leticia Van Allen
- Farrah Fawcett as Mary Ann Pringle
- Roger C. Carmel as Dr. Randolph Spencer Montag
- Roger Herren as Rusty Godowski
- George Furth as Charlie Flager, Jr.
- Calvin Lockhart as Irving Amadeus
- Jim Backus as Doctor
- John Carradine as Surgeon
- Andy Devine as Coyote Bill
- Grady Sutton as Kid Barlow
- Robert Lieb as Charlie Flager, Sr.
- Skip Ward as Chance
- Kathleen Freeman as Bobby Dean Loner
- B.S. Pully as Tex
- Buck Kartalian as Jeff
- Monte Landis as Vince
- Tom Selleck as Stud
- Toni Basil as Cigarette Girl
- Dan Hedaya as Hospital Ward Patient
- William Hopper as Judge Frederic D. Cannon (uncredited)

== Production ==
=== Development ===
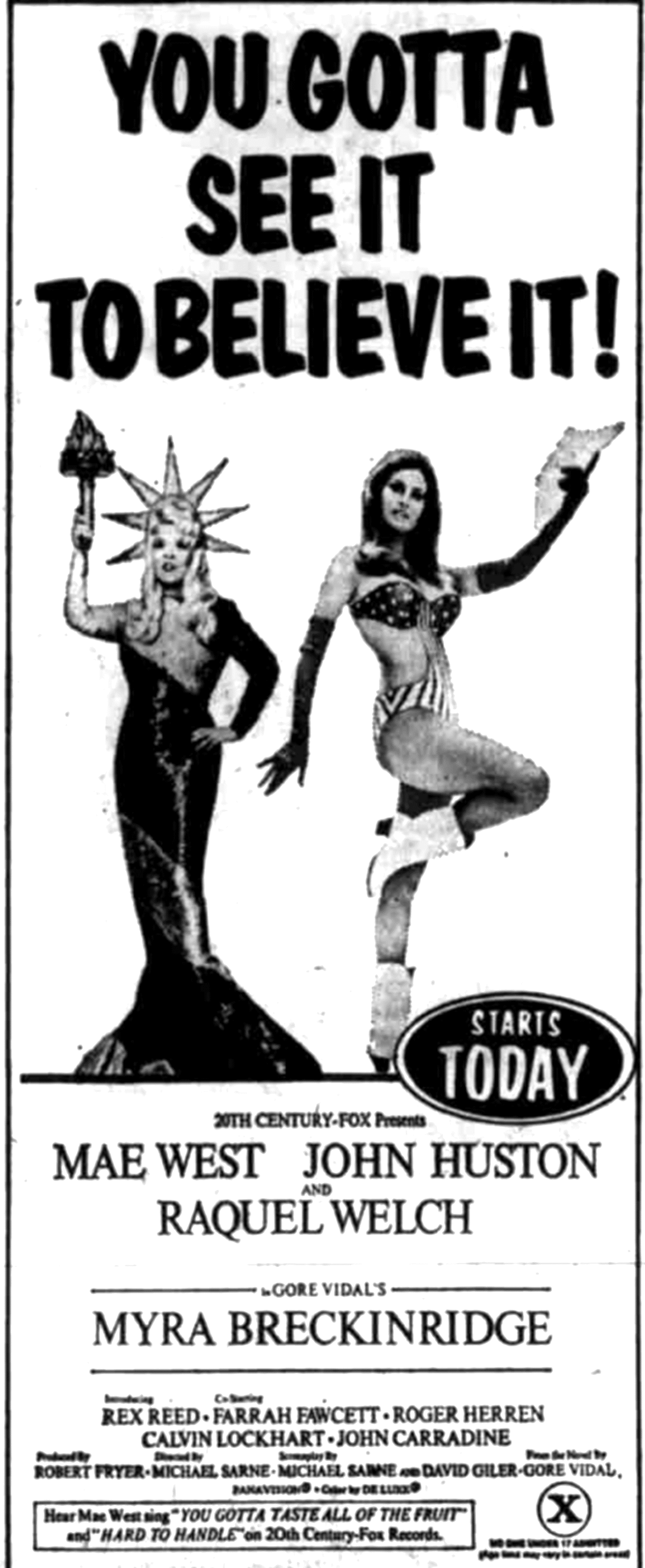
Theatrical advertisement from 1970

Film rights for Gore Vidal's novel Myra Breckinridge were sold for a reported $750,000 - $900,000 including a percentage of the profits and a fee covering Vidal writing the screenplay. Vidal wrote a draft, but the job was ultimately assigned to David Giler, who wrote a draft in three weeks. Vidal told Giler how much he liked the draft.

Michael Sarne had just made Joanna. 20th Century Fox's head of production, Dick Zanuck, said "he came to me when we had two lousy scripts and said he knew how to do it. He had some good ideas." Zanuck introduced Sarne to the film's producer, Robert Fryer, who was so impressed that the studio hired Sarne to write a script. The final draft of the script would be the tenth. The original director was Bud Yorkin. Producer Jim Cresson said "we thought he would play it too safe" and the studio ended up giving the job of directing to Sarne.

The producers conducted approximately 15 to 20 screen tests with drag queens and straight actors for the title role. Warhol superstar Candy Darling also sought the role, and according to Jack Doroshow (Flawless Sabrina), Vidal supported the idea of casting her, having suggested that she be given an audition before Doroshow became involved, but she was not invited to audition. Doroshow was hired as a consultant and traveled to Los Angeles for the auditions, which included Rachel Harlow, winner of the Miss All-America Camp Beauty Contest featured in The Queen (1968). The performers auditioned opposite John Huston, who played Myra's uncle, Buck Loner. Doroshow later recalled that the straight actors were uncomfortable portraying drag queens, while the drag queens were "playing themselves" rather than the character of Myra Breckinridge.

Raquel Welch was cast in July 1969. The next major casting was Mae West, accepting her first film role since 1943. (She said she had turned down Pal Joey and The Art of Love.) West was introduced to producer Robert Fryer via George Cukor. "It's a return, not a comeback," said West. "I've never been away, just busy." The producers allowed her to rewrite her dialogue and sing some songs, including "Hard to Handle". She was paid $350,000. In addition, West was allowed to arrive no earlier than 5 p.m. and had final approval over Welch's wardrobe as well as her own. She was also responsible for getting then-unknown Tom Selleck cast as one of her studs in the film. Farrah Fawcett was also an unknown when she was cast in this movie.

=== Shooting ===
Filming was laden with controversy due to Michael Sarne being granted complete control over the project. Sarne quickly went over budget due to his unorthodox techniques, which included spending up to seven hours at a time by himself, "thinking", leaving the cast to wait around on set for him to return so that filming could commence. Additionally, Sarne spent several days filming tables of food for a dream sequence which, in addition to being non-essential to the plot, appears in the film for only a few seconds. According to many accounts, Sarne encouraged bickering among cast members. After the failure of this film, he was never asked by an American studio to direct another film.

There were also reports of conflicts between Welch and West, who came out of a 27-year retirement to play Leticia Van Allen. Fawcett said that they projected their dislike towards each other onto her and stopped talking to her and that she would cry in her dressing room, afraid to come out. Furthermore, some 1940s- and 1950s-era film actors who appeared in Myra Breckinridge were upset that footage from their old films was inserted into the movie to punctuate some of the gags and the film's rape sequence. After the film was previewed in San Francisco, the White House demanded that footage from the 1937 film Heidi, featuring Shirley Temple, be removed due to Temple's role as a United States ambassador. Loretta Young also successfully sued to have footage of herself from The Story of Alexander Graham Bell removed from the film. Commenting on this, Rex Reed, who co-starred and was then a columnist, said "This was a film where the lawsuits really flew".

"I've never seen so many personality conflicts on one picture," said Richard Zanuck. "Fryer has quit three times. I don't think there's anyone on this movie who hasn't been fired or quit three times. Including me." "I feel sorry for Bob [producer Robert Fryer]," said Zanuck. "Raquel is always nervous during a film. Rex isn't exactly easy. And Sarne is rough. Much tougher than he looks." "Fryer is a really nice man," said Sarne. "We just disagree on everything." "He tells everybody on this picture we're diametrically opposed, which we are," said Fryer. "I want to do a comedy. He wants to do a fantasy. He's trying to superimpose 1964 Fellini—not Fellini, mind you, but 1964 Fellini—on a subject matter which is way out to begin with." "I don't understand it," said Giler. "Bobby Kennedy and Jack Kennedy, they were assassinated. But no one touches Sarne. Sarne's script for Myra should be hermetically sealed."

== Rating ==
Myra Breckinridge was one of two films with an X rating to be released by 20th Century Fox in 1970 (the other being Beyond the Valley of the Dolls, which became a satirical camp classic).

== Release ==
The film premiered at the Criterion Theatre in New York City on the evening of June 23, 1970. A crowd of roughly 2,000 people formed around the barriers of the red carpet to catch a glimpse of Raquel Welch and Mae West, who arrived separately. The crowd became riotous, which led to injuries and arrests, as people smashed windows and clashed with police. Michael Sarne did not attend the premiere. It opened the next day at the Criterion and at Loew's Tower East in New York City, as well as at Loew's Hollywood Theatre in Los Angeles, before expanding nationwide on July 1.

== Reception and legacy ==
Upon its release, the film drew fiercely negative reviews and was a box office flop. Time stated "Myra Breckinridge is about as funny as a child molester. It is an insult to intelligence, an affront to sensibility and an abomination to the eye." The critic added that the film was "so tasteless, it represents some sort of nadir in the history of American cinema". Gene Siskel gave the film half of one star out of four, writing, "Screenwriters David Giler and Michael Sarne have mangled Gore Vidal's sexy and clever novel, Myra Breckinridge, in adapting it for the screen. Gratuitous nudity and oafish direction have replaced wit and mystery." Herb Kelly wrote in The Miami News: "I now nominate Myra Breckinridge as the worst movie ever made ... nothing can touch it for tastelessness and boredom". Variety wrote that the film "plunges straight downhill under the weight of artless direction". The film is also cited in the book The Fifty Worst Films of All Time. Gore Vidal disowned the film, calling it "an awful joke". Film historian Leonard Maltin gave the film a BOMB (his lowest possible score). In his movie guide, he states that the film "tastelessly exploits many old Hollywood favorites through film clips". He also calls the film "as bad as any movie ever made".

In a 2012 interview with Mark Peikert, Welch said of the film, "The only good thing about that was the clothes." Rotten Tomatoes gives the film a rating of 24% from 21 reviews.

== Home media ==
In 2004, Myra Breckinridge was released on DVD with minor changes: to make the film's ending (that the title character never had a sex change) clearer, the ending sequence was changed to a black-and-white format. Since its release, it has developed a fan following.

== See also ==
- List of American films of 1970
- List of 20th century films considered the worst
- New Hollywood
