= Move (1970 film) =

1970 comedy film directed by Stuart Rosenberg

- Film poster
- Directed by: Stuart Rosenberg
- Written by: Joel Lieber; Stanley Hart
- Based on: novel by Joel Lieber
- Produced by: Pandro S. Berman
- Starring: Elliott Gould; Paula Prentiss
- Cinematography: William H. Daniels
- Edited by: Rita Roland
- Music by: Marvin Hamlisch
- Production company: Berman-Century Productions
- Distributed by: 20th Century Fox
- Release date: July 31, 1970
- Running time: 90 min
- Country: United States
- Language: English
- Budget: $2,785,000

Move is a 1970 American comedy film starring Elliott Gould, Paula Prentiss and Geneviève Waïte, and directed by Stuart Rosenberg. The screenplay was written by Joel Lieber and Stanley Hart, adapted from a novel by Lieber.

== Plot ==
The film covers three days in the life of Hiram Jaffe, a would-be playwright who supplements his living as a porn writer and by walking dogs. He and his wife, Dolly, are moving to a new apartment on New York's Upper West Side. Jaffe is beset by problems, including his inability to persuade the moving man to move the couple's furniture, and retreats into fantasy.

== Cast ==
- Elliott Gould as Hiram Jaffe
- Paula Prentiss as Dolly Jaffe
- Geneviève Waïte as Girl
- John Larch as Patrolman
- Joe Silver as Oscar
- Graham Jarvis as Dr. Picker
- Ron O'Neal as Peter
- Mae Questel as Katz
- Garrie Bean as Andrea

== Production ==
=== Original novel ===
The film was based on Move!, a novel by Joel Lieber which was published in 1968. The Chicago Tribune called the novel "largely amusing, sometimes puzzling." The New York Times called it "very funny."

=== Development ===
In February 1968, before the novel had been published, 20th Century Fox announced they had bought the screen rights for $85,000. They called it a "dirty Barefoot in the Park." Stuart Rosenberg was to direct, Pandro Berman to produce and Dustin Hoffman to star. Lieber did the first screenplay.

By February 1969, the lead had become Elliott Gould. In March, Gould signed a non-exclusive four-picture contract with Fox, the first of which was to be MASH and the second was supposed to be Move. Paula Prentiss signed in July. Shortly after, Genevieve Waite, who had been in Joanna, was announced as the third lead.

Gould was going to make Move after MASH when Columbia came to him with Getting Straight so he delayed the film to do that one. "Columbia said if I didn't take the part they'd drop it", he said. "I was the only actor they'd go with. I was never so flattered in my life."

== Reception ==
The film was as a box-office failure. However, according to Fox records the film required $4,905,000 in rentals to break even and by 11 December 1970 had made $5,000,000 so made a small profit to the studio.

Roger Greenspun of The New York Times wrote "Though I can remember some very good moments, I can also remember too many lapses, loose ends, failures in energy and invention...Both Elliott Gould and Paula Prentiss have been shortchanged by their roles, or by their director—to the extent that often you can catch them apparently waiting (in character) for something to do." Arthur D. Murphy of Variety wrote "'Move' walks the tightrope of zany comedy-fantasy, and doesn't it make it across...Gould has to carry the film singlehandedly, and the burden is much too great. Although only 90 minutes, film's pacing is lethargic." Gene Siskel of the Chicago Tribune gave the film two stars out of four and wrote that the fantasy sequences didn't work because "it is not always possible to tell which events are real and which are fantasy. The cause for this is not a clever script, but that one doesn't care to tell the difference. There's no reward. In other words, the central script idea has no meaning other than as a device." Kevin Thomas of the Los Angeles Times declared it "one of those pictures that seem funnier at the time than they are in retrospect, and it has a vivid if familiar central character but virtually no story. It is really but still another variation on '8½,' with a hero in whom you cannot tell when reality leaves off and fantasy begins." Gary Arnold of The Washington Post called it "a trifling new comedy vehicle for Elliott Gould. Although it's easy enough to sit through, the picture is so undemanding and insubstantial that it leaves no impression and no aftertaste."

Gould later said ""there were great elements in it" but felt Rosenberg while "a sweet man and a talented filmmaker...Comedy wasn’t his main field. There was a problem with the script, and I would always defer to the writers, to the director. I didn’t know that I might have gotten involved to develop something that might have fused Move."

Gould later was offered the lead role in Rosenberg's Pocket Money but turned it down because he did not want to work with Rosenberg again.

Lieber committed suicide in May 1971, aged 35.

== See also ==
- List of American films of 1970

== Bibliography ==
- Erens, Patricia (1988). The Jew in American Cinema. Indiana University Press. pp. 304-5. ISBN 9780253204936. - Access date: April 12, 2009
- Goodman, Mark (August 24, 1970). "Granny Knot". Time. Archived from the original on October 30, 2010.
