= John Phillips (John, the Wolf King of L.A.) =

Studio album by John Phillips
- Released: January 25, 1970
- Recorded: 1969
- Genre: Folk, country rock
- Length: 33:29
- Label: Dunhill
- Producer: Lou Adler

John Phillips chronology
John Phillips (John, the Wolf King of L.A.) (1970)	Brewster McCloud (1970)

Professional ratings
Review scores
Source	Rating
AllMusic	4/5 stars
Christgau's Record Guide	B+

John Phillips (John, the Wolf King of L.A.) is the first solo recording by the Mamas & the Papas leader John Phillips. All songs were Phillips originals, dealing mostly with recent events in Phillips' life, including references to his new girlfriend Geneviève Waïte and longtime friend Ann Marshall ("April Anne"). The backing musicians included members of Wrecking Crew. The album has received favorable contemporary reviews. The album was selected as one of ShortList's 55 Coolest Albums Ever.

As Phillips was the backing singer in the Mamas and the Papas, with the other three serving as lead singers, the album mix tends to de-emphasize his lead vocals. Denny Doherty stated that, had the Mamas & the Papas performed this album, it would have been one of their finest, because of the strength of Phillips' songs. "Mississippi" reached number 32 on the Billboard Hot 100 singles chart in the United States. Phillips and the other members of the Mamas & the Papas were threatened with a lawsuit just as the album was released, discouraging the label from promoting the album.

In 2006, the album was reissued by Varèse Sarabande with eight bonus tracks, also mostly Phillips originals.

== Charts ==
Chart (1970)	Peak position
US Billboard 200	181

== Track listing ==
All songs written by John Phillips, except where noted.

1. "April Anne" – 3:22
2. "Topanga Canyon" – 3:53
3. "Malibu People" – 3:41
4. "Someone's Sleeping" – 2:46
5. "Drum" – 3:36
6. "Captain" – 3:25
7. "Let It Bleed, Genevieve" – 2:53
8. "Down the Beach" – 2:52
9. "Mississippi" – 3:36
10. "Holland Tunnel" – 3:41

2006 bonus tracks

1. "Shady" – 3:48
2. "Lonely Children" – 3:44
3. "Lady Genevieve" – 4:30
4. "Black Girl" (Traditional) – 3:29
5. "The Frenchman" – 4:03
6. "16mm Baby" (Matthew Reich) – 2:41
7. "Larry, Joe, Hal and Me" – 2:25
8. "Mississippi" [Single Version] – 3:07

== Personnel ==
- John Phillips – vocals, guitar, harmonica
- Buddy Emmons – pedal steel
- James Burton – guitar, dobro
- Red Rhodes – steel guitar
- Darlene Love – vocals
- Fanita James – vocals
- Jean King – vocals
- Gordon Terry – fiddle, violin
- Hal Blaine – drums
- David Cohen – guitar
- Dr. Eric Hord – guitar
- Larry Knechtel – keyboards
- Joe Osborn – bass

Technical

- Chuck Britz – engineer
- Tom Gundelfinger – photography
