= Charles Blackwell (music arranger) =

English music arranger (1940–2024)

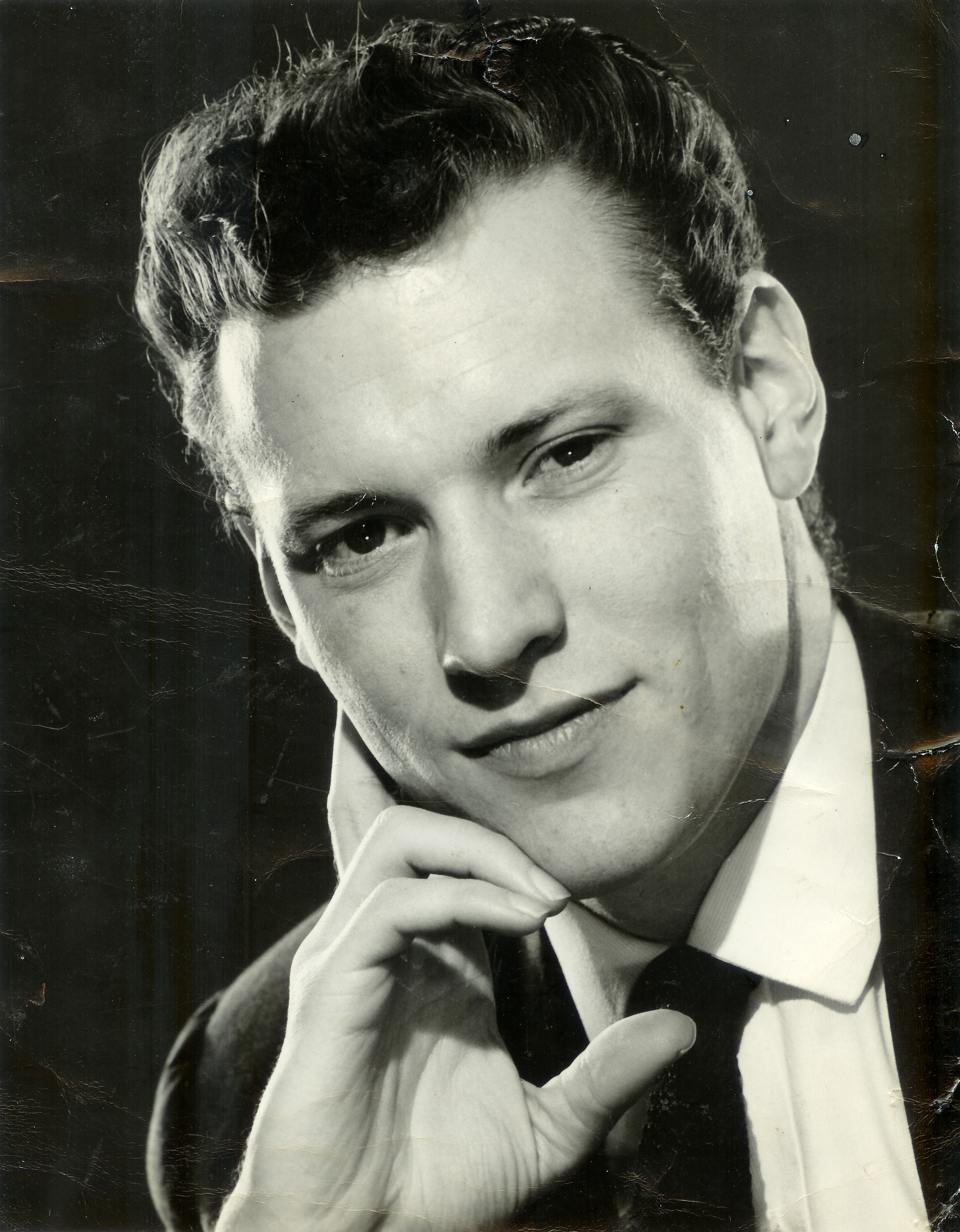
- Blackwell in the 1960s

Background information
- Born: 20 May 1940; Leytonstone, Essex, England
- Died: 14 August 2024 (aged 84)
- Genres: Pop
- Occupations: Music arranger, record producer, songwriter
- Years active: 1960–2024

Charles Blackwell (born Ramsey 20 May 1940 – 14 August 2024) was an English arranger, record producer and songwriter. He began his career in music publishing offices in Denmark Street, London. At the age of 18 he was music director of Joe Meek's record label. He became a prolific studio arranger and record producer in the 1960s and 1970s with a string of hits, and recorded with many famous artistes. He was later commissioned to orchestrate Beethoven's "Ode to Joy" for a recording to be played at every sitting of the European Parliament.

== Early life and career ==
Charles Blackwell was born in Leytonstone, Essex, on 20 May 1940. His parents separated when he was young and he was sent to live with his grandparents, where he found solace in his grandmother's old upright piano and began picking out tunes. When his mother remarried he took his stepfather's surname.

He began taking piano lessons and by the age of 16 was writing his own songs. He sent some to a music publisher in London's Denmark Street (Britain's "Tin Pan Alley"), where music publishers, promoters and agents had their offices. The publisher was impressed by his enthusiasm and took him on as a stock clerk. He had also learned to read and write music and write arrangements and, aged 17, another publisher employed him as a copyist.

In 1957, aged 18, he met record producer Joe Meek and started working for him as an arranger. Meek was in the process of setting up a recording studio and record label. He recognised Blackwell's skills and musical talent and suggested a partnership. Blackwell became musical director at Meek's Triumph Records label and turned Meek's ideas into pop songs with catchy hooks and professional arrangements. TV and record producer Jack Good described Blackwell as "a mastermind and surely the only teenage music director in the business". By 1962, Blackwell had moved on and was working as an arranger for other producers.

Blackwell became one of the most prolific studio arrangers and record producers of the 1960s and 1970s, with a string of hit records to his credit. These included "Johnny Remember Me" by John Leyton; "What's New Pussycat", on which he worked with Burt Bacharach, and "I'll Never Fall in Love Again" by Tom Jones; and "Release Me", "A Man Without Love" by Engelbert Humperdinck. In addition, he was involved in the recordings of "Hold Me" for P.J. Proby, and in a number of hits by Kathy Kirby, including "Secret Love". Blackwell also regularly arranged and conducted studio recordings for francophone artists, including Art Sullivan, Michel Polnareff ("Love Me Please Love Me"), and Françoise Hardy ("Je Veux Qu'il Revienne" / "Only You Can Do It"). He composed a number of hits for Hardy. He had many hits with television producer, Jack Good, producing for Decca Records; these included The Vernons Girls, Jess Conrad, Jet Harris and Karl Denver.

Blackwell had a huge roster of artistes that he has recorded with, including Shirley Bassey, Lena Horne, Buddy Greco, Billy Fury, Adam Faith, Marlene Dietrich, Paul Anka, Françoise Hardy, Brigitte Bardot, Lulu, Vera Lynn, Slim Whitman, Bobby Goldsboro, Dionne Warwick, Gene Pitney, Brook Benton, Del Shannon and Jackie DeShannon. While in Australia in 1963 he produced "Proud of You", the biggest hit of Sydney vocalist Jay Justin's career. Blackwell arranged the title song for the 1960s television series, Fireball XL5, and wrote several film scores including A Place to Go (1963) and Some Girls Do (1969). He also worked with Burt Bacharach on two Peter Sellers' films, What's New Pussycat? (1965) and After the Fox (1966). He wrote the music and lyrics for the 1962 UK chart-topper "Come Outside" recorded by Mike Sarne and Wendy Richards. The million selling "Tchin Tchin" by Richard Anthony was also composed by him. Also in 1962 he was musical director for a Jimmy Savile song "Ahab the Arab". It was released by Decca records on their label.

In 1974, he arranged and conducted the Luxembourg entry ("Bye Bye I Love You") at the Eurovision Song Contest in Brighton. In the 1990s, he co-wrote a number of hits in Europe for David Hasselhoff. In 2005, he was the arranger and musical director of the African dance stage show Sun Dance. He was later commissioned by the European Parliament to orchestrate and conduct the Anthem of Europe ("Ode to Joy" by Beethoven) with a 70-man orchestra, for a new recording that is played at every parliamentary sitting.

Charles Blackwell died on 14 August 2024 at the age of 84.

== Discography ==
- Those Plucking Strings - Charles Blackwell and his Orchestra (2006, RPM Records)
