= Renegade Soundwave =

English band (1987–1995)

- Origin: London, England
- Genres: Alternative dance; breakbeat; dub
- Years active: 1987–1995
- Labels: Rhythm King; Mute
- Past members: Gary Asquith; Carl Bonnie; Danny Briottet

Renegade Soundwave (sometimes shortened to RSW) were an electronic music group. Formed in London in 1986, the group originally consisted of Gary Asquith, Carl Bonnie and Danny Briottet. Their debut LP Soundclash was released in 1990 on Mute Records. It featured the UK top 40 hit "Probably a Robbery" and dancefloor favourite "Biting My Nails".

== History ==
Debuting on Rhythm King label with the "Kray Twins" single, their early records mixed together the sound of the then embryonic dance scene, hip-hop, dub, sampling and electro-industrial noise. Later singles such as "Biting My Nails" (a cover version of a song by Genevieve Waite, from her 1974 album, Romance Is on the Rise, produced by her husband, John Phillips of The Mamas and the Papas) and "The Phantom" became early dancefloor classics, with "Probably a Robbery" eventually reaching number 38 on the UK Singles Chart in 1990, mostly due to the AA side "Ozone Breakdown"; a popular dance track, which featured a sample from the film, The Warriors.

A switch to Mute Records brought the release of the debut long-player Soundclash in 1990, swiftly followed by In Dub. The Japanese version of In Dub featured a second disc of the cuts, previously available only on their early 12" singles. At this point, Bonnie exited to pursue a solo career (citing musical differences), leaving Briottet and Asquith to continue as a duo. After two more albums, the group formally disbanded in 1995, leaving behind a legacy of four albums and 12 singles.

In 2003, Layo and Bushwacka remixed "The Phantom". 2005 saw the appearance of a white label record entitled Robbery, which featured remixed versions of RSW tunes such as "Ozone Breakdown".

Danny Briottet went on to forge a successful career as producer, remixer, composer of soundtracks and international DJ. He is producing and recording/remixing under his own name and various guises including Red Star, Rhythm Riders (with Aswad), 3DB (with collaborator Dan Donovan, formerly of Big Audio Dynamite and Dreadzone) and Subsonic Legacy. Briottet is also creative director of Musicstate Ltd, the provider of global synchronisation music. Briottet's remix and production credits include Depeche Mode, Grace Jones, Orbital, Moby, Cypress Hill, Radiohead, Dreadzone and a host of underground dance records and African and Arabic artists. In 2017, Briottet completed work on the soundtrack to the feature film, 3 Way Week.

As of 2010, Gary Asquith runs Le Coq Musique record label alongside Kevin Mooney formerly of Adam and the Ants and both are in a band called Lavender Pill Mob. Both Asquith and Mooney have worked alongside electro artist Lee Simeone, including a track written by Asquith titled "Ocean".

== Discography ==
=== Albums ===
- Soundclash (Mute, 1990) - UK No. 74
- In Dub (Mute Records, 1990)
- In Dub (Japan-only 2-CD Version) (Mute Records, 1991)
- Howyoudoin? (Mute Records, 1994) - CMJ Radio Top 150 No. 115
- The Next Chapter of Dub (Mute Records, 1995)

=== Compilations ===
- RSW 1987-1995 (Mute Records, 1996)

=== Video collections ===
- In Video (Mute Film, 1991, VHS)

=== Singles ===
- "Kray Twins" (1986)
- "Cocaine Sex" (1987)
- "Biting My Nails" (1988) - US Modern Rock Tracks No. 11
- "Probably a Robbery" (1989) - UK No. 38
- "Space Gladiator" / "The Phantom" (1989)
- "Thunder II" (1990)
- "Women Respond to Bass" (1992)
- "Renegade Soundwave" (1994) - UK No. 64
- "Brixton" (1995)
- "Positive ID" (1995)
- "Positive Dub Mixes" (1995)

=== Remixes ===
- Bassomatic - "Ease On By" (Claudia Canniggia Mix) (1990)
- Double Trouble - "Celebrate" (Renegade Soundwave Mix) (1990)
- Double Trouble - "Celebrate" (Renegade Soundwave Dub Mix) (1990)
- Pop Will Eat Itself - "Touched By The Hand Of Cicciolina" (The Renegade Soundwave Mix (Smoothneck)) (1990)
- Nitzer Ebb - "Lightning Man" (Renegade Soundwave Mix) (1990)
- Bassomatic - "Fascinating Rhythm" (Claudio Caniggia Mix) (1991)
- The Shamen - "Light Span" (Soundwave) (1991)
- Depeche Mode - "I Feel You" (Renegade Soundwave Afghan Surgery Mix) (1993)
- Gary Numan - "Are 'Friends' Electric?" (The Renegade Soundwave 1991 Mix) (1991)
- Soft Ballet - "America" (Remixed by Renegade Soundwave) (1992)

Gary Asquith's remixes include:

- Gary Numan - "Are 'Friends' Electric?" (The Renegade Soundwave 1991 Mix) (1991)

Danny Briottet's remixes include:

- Moby - "Why Does My Heart"
- Cypress Hill - "Freak Dat Funk"
- Depeche Mode - "Only When I Lose Myself"
- Barry Adamson - "What It's Worth"
- Radiohead - "Planet Telex"
- Tappa Zukie - "MPLA"
- Orbital - "Beelzedub"
- Grace Jones - "Corporate Cannibal"
