= Come Outside (song) =

1962 single by Wendy Richard and Mike Sarne

Single by Mike Sarne with accompaniment directed by Charles Blackwell featuring Wendy Richard
- B-side: "Fountain of Love"
- Released: 1962
- Recorded: England
- Genre: Novelty
- Label: Parlophone R4902
- Songwriter: Charles Blackwell
- Producer: Charles Blackwell

Mike Sarne with accompaniment directed by Charles Blackwell featuring Wendy Richard singles chronology
"Come Outside"	"Will I What?"

"Come Outside" is a song written by Charles Blackwell. A recording credited to Mike Sarne with accompaniment directed by Charles Blackwell featuring Wendy Richard reached number one in the UK Singles Chart in 1962. The track stayed at number one for a fortnight during the weeks commencing 28 June and 5 July 1962. The song was placed twelfth on the chart of overall single sales for the calendar year 1962 in the UK.

According to an article in The Daily Telegraph dated 9 May 1998, and cited by Songfacts, the song was originally intended by Blackwell to be a solo. Wendy Richard, then a secretary for the producer Robert Stigwood, was making comments from her desk during the production process and Stigwood decided to include her on the record, apparently despite objections from Blackwell.

In 1962, Alan Klein later of the New Vaudeville Band, made a video of this song with Julie Samuel. In 1991, Samantha Fox, Frank Bruno, Liz Kershaw and Bruno Brookes recorded a cover version as the official Children in Need single of the year.
