= Pamela Rooke =

English model and actress (1955–2022)

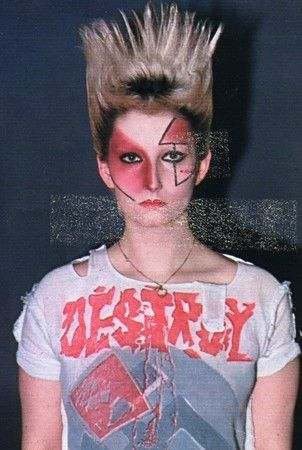
- Rooke in 1978
- Born: 23 June 1955; Seaford, East Sussex, England
- Died: 3 April 2022 (aged 66); Seaford, East Sussex, England
- Other names: Jordan; Jordan Mooney
- Occupations: Model; actress; band manager; singer; author; veterinary nurse
- Years active: 1969–1984
- Employer(s): Vivienne Westwood, Malcolm McLaren
- Known for: Contributions to Punk fashion
- Notable work: Jubilee
- Spouse: Kevin Mooney (m. 1981; div. 1984)

Pamela Rooke (23 June 1955 – 3 April 2022), better known by her mononym Jordan, was an English model and actress known for her work with Vivienne Westwood and the Sex boutique in the Kings Road area of London in the mid-1970s, and for attending many of the early Sex Pistols performances. Her style and dress sense—notably, her bleached platinum-blonde bouffant and excessive dark eye make-up—made her a highly visible icon of the London punk subculture. Alongside Johnny Rotten, Soo Catwoman, and Siouxsie Sioux, she is credited with creating the London punk look.

== Biography ==
Rooke took the single name "Jordan" at the age of 14, in Seaford, East Sussex. When Jordan first walked into 430 King's Road, London, wearing gold stilettos, a see-through net skirt, with a white bouffant hairstyle, it had just changed to Sex,

but there wasn't a position at the time so I got a job in Harrods, on the third floor in a place called Way In. ... A few weeks later I then got a call from Michael [Collins, the manager] asking if I could come in... Malcolm [Maclaren] had been in New York with The New York Dolls when I was hired.

Rooke commuted for two hours each day to London from Seaford. She recalled that her punk image caused problems for her:

I commuted for about two years. I had some real bad dos on the train. I had tourists trying to pay me for my photo ... worse than that, mothers saying that I'm upsetting their children and debauching them and how dare I get on a train looking like that. Somebody tried to throw me off the train one day, literally out the door, so British Rail told me to go sit in first class, get out of trouble.

In early 1977, Rooke served as an early manager for The Ants, later extended to Adam and the Ants. She recorded the track "Lou" (about Lou Reed) as a guest lead vocalist with the band for BBC Radio 1 DJ John Peel's Peel Sessions and often performed the song live with them from mid-1977 up until 14 May 1978, when she left the band after a gig at Roundhouse. In the mid-1980s, she managed her then-husband Kevin Mooney’s band Wide Boy Awake, in which Mooney was the guitarist. Mooney had also previously been in Adam and the Ants as its bassist from 1980 to 1981.

Rooke made a cameo appearance in Derek Jarman's debut film Sebastiane, and played the lead role in his follow-up film Jubilee as the punk "anti-historian" Amyl Nitrate (named after the drug amyl nitrite). She can also be seen in Julien Temple's The Great Rock and Roll Swindle wearing an "Only anarchists are pretty" T-shirt and appearing on stage with the Sex Pistols during their first live television performance of "Anarchy in the U.K." in August 1976.

In 1984, after divorcing Mooney, Rooke returned to Seaford, breeding Burmese cats and working as a veterinary nurse. Rooke's autobiography, Defying Gravity: Jordan's Story, written with Cathi Unsworth, was published by Omnibus Press in 2019.

== Death ==
On 4 April 2022, Rooke’s partner and Brighton and Hove's News journalist Nick Linazasoro announced that following a short period of illness, Rooke had died the previous night in her hometown of Seaford, East Sussex on 3 April 2022 from cholangiocarcinoma at the age of 66.

== In popular culture ==
Maisie Williams portrayed Rooke in the FX Network series Pistol, which portrays Rooke's political influence in the London punk scene and her ethos of turning the male gaze in on itself, thus weaponizing the male gaze.
