= A Place to Go =

1963 British film by Basil Dearden

- UK theatrical release poster
- Directed by: Basil Dearden
- Written by: Clive Exton; Michael Fisher; Michael Relph
- Produced by: Michael Relph
- Starring: Bernard Lee; Rita Tushingham; Mike Sarne
- Cinematography: Reginald H. Wyer
- Edited by: John D. Guthridge
- Music by: Charles Blackwell
- Distributed by: Bryanston Films (UK)
- Release date: July 1963 (UK)
- Running time: 86 minutes
- Country: United Kingdom
- Language: English
- Budget: £155,000

A Place to Go is a 1963 British crime drama film directed by Basil Dearden and starring Bernard Lee, Rita Tushingham and Mike Sarne. It was based on the 1961 novel Bethnal Green by Michael Fisher.

Set in contemporary Bethnal Green in the East End of London, it charts the dramatic changes that were then happening in the lives of the British working class, fitting into the kitchen sink school of film-making that was popular in Britain at the time.

== Plot ==
Ricky Flint dreams of escaping working-class Bethnal Green, where he works in a cigarette factory and shares a crowded terraced house with his middle-aged parents Matt and Lil; his pregnant sister Betsy, who soon gives birth; and Betsy's husband Jim. In order to get the money to leave, Ricky agrees to help a local gangster, Jack Ellerman, to rob the cigarette factory, and also gets Jim, a lorry driver hoping to buy an expensive transport licence, to join the plot. Ricky finds himself attracted to Catherine "Cat" Donovan, who has been dating Charlie Batey, another member of Jack's gang. Cat agrees to date Ricky and even make love with him, but she is fiercely independent and refuses to take orders from him or stop seeing Charlie, pointing out that she and Ricky are not engaged so she is free to do as she likes.

Ricky's father Matt, a dockworker, also wants to leave his insecure job and strike out on his own. He eventually leaves the docks and becomes a busker with a Houdiniesque escape routine. Matt hates Jack Ellerman, who has been more financially successful than himself and was also his rival for Lil's affections many years before. When Matt finds Jack and his gang meeting Ricky and Jim at the Flints' house his anger, on top of the stress of busking, causes him to suffer a fatal stroke.

On the night of the planned robbery Jim decides at the last minute that he cannot go through with it and risk his family's future. Ricky takes Jim's lorry without his knowledge and fills in for Jim, as well as doing his own part by disabling the factory alarm. However, when Jack orders Ricky to stand guard with a lead pipe Ricky finds himself unable to hit a police officer who approaches and disrupts the robbery, thus leaving it to Charlie to knock the officer out. Charlie later takes revenge on Ricky by setting fire to Jim's lorry. Ricky is badly burned attempting to put out the fire and recovers in hospital. Cat visits him there, but also continues seeing Charlie.

Meanwhile, slum clearance forces Lil to move out of her home of 30 years into a new flat in another area. Jim and Betsy use the insurance money from the burned lorry to move into a house of their own, which Betsy had wanted, though now she finds it somewhat lonely. Jim gives up his dream of being a lorry driver for a steady job in a local factory.

After Ricky is released from hospital he finds Cat with Charlie at the pub and attacks Charlie. The police arrive and arrest both men. In court Ricky testifies that he and Cat are engaged, and that he was angry because she was seeing Charlie while he was in hospital. When Cat corroborates Ricky's testimony the judge is lenient and lets Ricky off with a fine. Ricky and Cat then decide to make their engagement a reality.

== Cast ==
- Bernard Lee as Matt Flint
- Rita Tushingham as Catherine Donovan
- Mike Sarne as Ricky Flint
- Doris Hare as Lil Flint
- Barbara Ferris as Betsy
- John Slater as Jack Ellerman
- David Andrews as Jim
- William Marlowe as Charlie Batey
- Michael Wynne as Pug
- Roy Kinnear as Bunting
- Norman Shelley as the magistrate
- Jerry Verno as Nobby Knowles

== Differences between the novel and the film ==
In the book Charlie's character is called Spider. Matt's busking act is fire-breathing, not escapology. When Jim changes his mind about the robbery Jack postpones it, and they set fire to the van that night in revenge. Ricky and Jim go to confront Jack and his gang, but Ricky has a change of heart, leaving Jim to be badly beaten. Ricky flees the scene upset and, longing for his father, tries to simulate Matt's fire-breathing act: that is how he burns his face. The botched robbery goes ahead after Ricky leaves hospital, and the next day, racked with guilt, Ricky and Cat go to apologise to Jack and to tell him that they don't want to be involved in the gang any more. Jack threatens to have Ricky beaten up if he refuses to stay in the gang, but Ricky chooses to take the beating. Afterwards Jack confides that he felt as if Ricky was a son to him, heavily hinting that he is actually his real father. Ricky and Cat escape down the canal on a small boat and plan their future life together. Jack is an overtly Jewish character in the novel, surname Immerman. The story is set at Clare Street, Cambridge Heath, but filmed around Appleby Street, Haggerston, prior to redevelopment.

== Production ==
The greyhound-racing scenes in the film were set at Clapton Stadium.

Pub scenes were mostly filmed at The Acorn, a pub in Bethnal Green demolished in 2019, but there is also an exterior shot of The Angel in City Road, Islington.

The rest of the outdoor shots were filmed on location in Haggerston and Bethnal Green.

== Reception ==
The Monthly Film Bulletin wrote: "Relph and Dearden and 'new realism'. Everything is there, from childbirth at a Christmas party and teenage violence, to union troubles and slum clearance evictions, all glued together with a patronising brand of sentimentality, and punctuated from time to time by those dear old shots of urban chimney-stacks. Rita Tushingham and Mike Sarne are likeable enough, but the acting in general seems daunted by the material. The occasional smartly funny lines are presumably due to Clive Exton's 'additional dialogue'."

Variety wrote: "The experienced team of Michael Relph and Basil Dearden might well have been expected to come across with a more lively, incisive treatment of even such a tired old theme as A Place To Go. But it has defeated them, and despite one or two brisk directorial touches and a few dependable performances, they are left wallowing in cliches. A Place To Go has an apt title, for it is the sort of film that may pass away an hour and a half, providing a person has no place to go but the cinema."

The Radio Times Guide to Films gave the film 2/5 stars, writing: "Michael Sarne goes all mean and moody to unfortunately comic effect as he bids to beat the Bethnal Green blues with an ill-conceived factory heist. Rita Tushingham and Bernard Lee do what they can with a dodgy script, while director Basil Dearden captures something of the flavour of the East End. Lacklustre."

Leslie Halliwell said: "Panorama of London low-life, efficiently varied and well made but not in any way memorable. It Always Rains on Sunday, fifteen years earlier, was better."
