= Some People (film) =

1962 British film by Clive Donner

- Directed by: Clive Donner
- Written by: John Eldridge
- Produced by: James Archibald
- Starring: Kenneth More; Ray Brooks
- Cinematography: John Wilcox
- Edited by: Fergus McDonell
- Music by: Ron Grainer
- Production company: Vic Films Productions
- Distributed by: Anglo-Amalgamated Film Distributors (UK)
- Release date: June 1962
- Running time: 93 min.
- Country: United Kingdom
- Language: English
- Budget: $200,000

Some People is a 1962 film directed by Clive Donner, starring Kenneth More and Ray Brooks. It was written by John Eldridge.

It is centred on the Duke of Edinburgh's Award Scheme.

== Plot ==
Mr Smith is an aircraft engineer, who also acts as a voluntary choirmaster and youth worker. He tries to help a group of teenagers in Bristol, by encouraging positive social development after they lose their motorcycle licences. They are all in dead-end jobs with no home life and on the fringes of petty crime, but are musically talented.

== Cast ==
- Kenneth More as Mr. Smith
- Ray Brooks as Johnnie
- Anneke Wills as Anne Smith
- David Andrews as Bill
- Angela Douglas as Terry
- David Hemmings as Bert
- Timothy Nightingale as Tim
- Frankie Dymon Jnr as Jimmy
- Harry H. Corbett as Johnnie's father
- Fanny Carby as Johnnie's mother
- Richard Davies as Harper
- Michael Gwynn as vicar
- Cyril Luckham as magistrate
- Valerie Mountain dubbed Angela Douglas's singing voice

== Production ==
Director Clive Donner, who had been working in advertising, was approached to make a documentary to promote the Duke of Edinburgh scheme. Donner felt the documentary would only reach people who already knew about the scheme, and suggested they make a dramatic feature instead.

The film was produced by advertising producer James Archibald, who envisioned it as a way to promote the Duke of Edinburgh scheme. He used this to get star Kenneth More to appear for nothing and for Anglo Amalgamated to distribute for free.

Archibald said generous donations such as these enabled the film as "a $700,000 film that will be brought in for less than $200,000 because of the generosity of the film industry and others."

The film was shot entirely on location in Bristol with Anneke Wills recalling that the crew arrived in Bristol three weeks before shooting to get the feel of Bristol with the boys learning the local accent, riding motorbikes and visiting local dance halls with much of the script being ad-libbed. Local filming locations were used including the W.D. & H.O. Wills cigarette factory, Royal York Crescent, Clifton Suspension Bridge, the Theatre Royal, the Palace Hotel, Bristol South public baths, the city docks, The Portway and Lockleaze, with Lockleaze School used for much of the interior filming.

Kenneth More agreed to play his role for nothing apart from his expenses because he had no other offers around the time, and the movie was for a good cause: all proceeds were to go to the Duke of Edinburgh's Award Scheme who commissioned the film and the National Playing Fields Association. During filming he began an affair with one of the cast, Angela Douglas, who became his wife. Donner called More's casting "our ace in the hole."

The film features a test flight of the Bristol 188.

== Music ==
The title song was performed in the film by Valerie Mountain and The Eagles. Pye Records released their version as a single. Other versions were released by Carol Deene and the former bass player for The Shadows, Jet Harris.

== Reception ==
=== Box office ===
According to Kinematograph Weekly the film was considered a "money maker" at the British box office in 1962. The film reportedly made a profit, in part because of its low cost. Donner said the film was a "huge success" which made "a lot of money" for the Duke of Edinburgh Scheme and also reignited his film career.

=== Critical reception ===
Kine Weekly said "Sociological comedy drama with songs given the full Eastman Color treatment. Briskly unfolded against a vivid Bristol city backdrop ... the picture leaves a few things unexplained, but, by and large, it's a laughable and holding working-class mosaic, illuminated by lofty sentiment.

Monthly Film Bulletin wrote "Not without charm and showing, for the most part, a nice attention to detail, this teenage film (the profits of which go to the Duke of Edinburgh Award Scheme) is transparently well-meaning and made with obvious affection. Unfortunately, it has nothing to add to that now painfully familiar delinquency formula which combines a liking for coffee bars, motor bikes and guitars with an inability to talk reasonably to Father. The script fails not because it is heavily weighted in favour of the Kenneth More character but because of the needlessly naive way in which this is done. Relying mainly on superficialities for its effects, the film finally outcasts the one thoroughly rootless delinquent who should have been its main concern."

Variety called it "reasonable entertainment."

Leslie Halliwell said: "Bland propaganda for the Duke of Edinburgh's Award Scheme for young people, quite acceptably presented, with pop music ad lib."

The Radio Times Guide to Films gave the film 3/5 stars, writing: "This coffee bar musical arrived two months before The Beatles, but its moral values are those of the early 1950s: motorbikes and pop music equal juvenile delinquency, and what young tearaways need is spiritual guidance. ... Ray Brooks and David Hemmings are among the boys who are taken under the wing of church organist Kenneth More. Naively charming, with unusual Bristol locations and a bouncy title song.
