= Turning Point Alcohol and Drug Centre =

- Eastern Health

Geography
- Location: Richmond, Melbourne, Victoria, Australia

Organisation
- Type: Specialist

Services
- Speciality: Addiction treatment

History
- Opened: 1994

Links
- Website: www.turningpoint.org.au
- Lists: Hospitals in Australia

Turning Point Alcohol and Drug Centre is an alcohol and other drugs organisation located in the inner Melbourne (Australia) suburb of Richmond. Established in 1994 in Fitzroy, the organisation provides clinical treatment and support to those with substance addiction issues, as well as conducting clinical and epidemiological research and development. In addition, the organisation provides education and training to health and welfare professionals.

The organisation's approach to alcohol and other drugs clinical treatment is primarily based upon the medical model of treatment. This includes using an evidence based approach to treatment services and implementing harm minimisation techniques towards relevant client issues.

The organisation amalgamated with public health provider Eastern Health in October 2009, and is formally affiliated with Monash University. In addition, Turning Point collaborates with international organisations including The United Nations Office of Drugs and Crime (UNODC); International Network of Drug Treatment and Rehabilitation Resource Centres, California State University; Center for Behavioral Research and Services, Yale University; Center for Interdisciplinary Research on AIDS and The International Harm Reduction Association.

Turning Point Alcohol and Drug Centre former home on Gertrude St Fitzroy.

== Services ==
=== Clinical and forensic treatment and support ===
Turning Point provides counselling, case management and primary care services from a wide range of health professionals and practitioners, including; Alcohol and Other Drug Clinicians (more commonly known as Case Managers), Forensic Alcohol and Other Drug Clinicians (Forensic Case Managers) General Practitioners, Psychiatrists, Psychologists (both Clinical and Counselling), Pharmacists and Nurses.

Treatment and support can be provided in the following forms:

- Traditional face to face counselling (see Therapeutic Relationship).
- Group therapy.
- Outreach response.
- Home-based withdrawal.
- Telephone counselling.
- Online counselling.

==== Specialist pharmacotherapy programs ====
Turning Point provides eligible clients access to medically supervised drug substitution pharmacotherapies such as Methadone (see Methadone Maintenance), Suboxone and Subutex.

==== Specialist assessment and consultancy services ====
Turning Point provides services in the following areas:

- Alcohol and other drug use assessment.
- Dual diagnosis (a combination of a mental health issue and a substance use disorder).
- Comorbidity.
- Acquired Brain Injury (ABI).
- Chronic pain.

==== Needle and syringe program (NSP) ====
Turning Point provides a comprehensive program to the local general public, including the supply and exchange of hypodermic needles as well as various other harm minimisation provisions.
