= Rex Reed =

American film critic (1938–2026)

- Reed in 1969
- Born: Rex Taylor Reed; October 2, 1938; Fort Worth, Texas, U.S.
- Died: May 12, 2026 (aged 87); New York City, U.S.
- Education: Louisiana State University
- Occupations: Film critic, writer
- Writing career
- Years active: 1967–2025

Rex Taylor Reed (October 2, 1938 – May 12, 2026) was an American film critic, journalist, actor and media personality. Raised throughout the American South and educated at Louisiana State University, Reed moved to New York City in the early 1960s to begin his career, writing about popular culture, art, and celebrities for a number of newspapers and magazines. He became a public figure in his own right, making regular appearances on television and occasionally acting in films throughout the 1970s and 1980s. Reed was a longtime writer for The New York Observer, where he authored the "Talk of the Town" column. He was known for his blunt style and contrarian tastes, and some of his writing has been criticized for containing factual errors or disparaging remarks about actors. Reed authored eight books, including Do You Sleep in the Nude?, Conversations in the Raw, People Are Crazy Here, and Valentines & Vitriol.

== Early life ==
Reed was born on October 2, 1938, in Fort Worth, Texas, the son of Jewell (née Smith) and James M. Reed, an oil company supervisor. In an interview with The New York Times, Reed stated: "My mother came from a family of 10 in Oklahoma, her second cousins were the Dalton Gang. And when my grandfather was a little boy, he was rocked by Jesse James on his knee." Due to his father's profession, the family moved throughout the U.S. South during Reed's childhood.

He earned his journalism degree from Louisiana State University in 1960. There, he began writing film and play reviews, not only for the university's newspaper, The Daily Reveille, but also for the Baton Rouge newspaper, The Morning Advocate.

== Career ==
Reed moved to New York City after graduating from LSU, hoping to find success as an actor. Instead, he was hired to work at the publicity department of 20th Century Fox. In 1969, he said his job there was to "write those puffy things about Elvis Presley and—you know—Fabian, and tell everybody how great they were when I wouldn't be caught dead seeing their movies myself. [...] Cleopatra came along and rocked the company financially. We were saving on rubber bands and paying Elizabeth Taylor and Richard Burton to float down the Nile while everybody back at Fox was taking salary cuts, and I was the first one to go—the little guy at the $75 salary, the most dispensable item in the company. I was fired." Later in the decade, he provided many interviews for The New York Times and New York, which at the time was the Sunday magazine of the New York Herald Tribune. In 1966, the year in which the Herald Tribune folded, he was hired as one of the music critics for HiFi/Stereo Review (now Sound & Vision), where he remained until 1973.

=== Critic ===
Before becoming a film critic for The New York Observer in 1987, Reed was a film critic for Vogue, GQ, The New York Times, and Women's Wear Daily. For thirteen years, he was an arts critic for the New York Daily News, and for five years was the film critic for the New York Post. He was briefly laid off from the Observer in 2017 but was subsequently rehired and continued to work there until his death in 2026. In addition, Reed served on the jury at the 21st Berlin International Film Festival in 1971, and the 33rd Venice International Film Festival in 1972. Reed was not given a ticket to the world premiere of Last Tango in Paris at the 1972 New York Film Festival as the festival considered him a columnist for the New York Daily News, rather than a regular film critic, as well as describing him as "[not] a friend of the festival".

On October 27, 1974, reviewing Frank Sinatra's performance at Madison Square Garden, Reed called him "a Woolworth rhinestone" and wrote that "his public image is uglier than a first-degree burn, his appearance is sloppier than Porky Pig; his manners are more appalling than a subway sandhog's and his ego bigger than the Sahara (the desert, not the hotel in Las Vegas, although either comparison applies). All of which might be tolerable if he could still sing. But the saddest part of all is the hardest part to face about this once-great idol now living on former glory: the grim truth is that Frank Sinatra has had it. His voice has been manhandled beyond recognition, bringing with its parched croak only a painful memory of burned-out yesterdays." Years later, Reed recalled that Sinatra "was sloppy" and "looked like he'd slept in his clothes. Sinatra was mad at me, but what did he do? He lost 25 pounds!"

In 1986, after Marlee Matlin won the Academy Award for Best Actress for Children of a Lesser God, Reed wrote that Matlin had won because of a "pity vote", and that a deaf person playing a deaf character was not really acting.

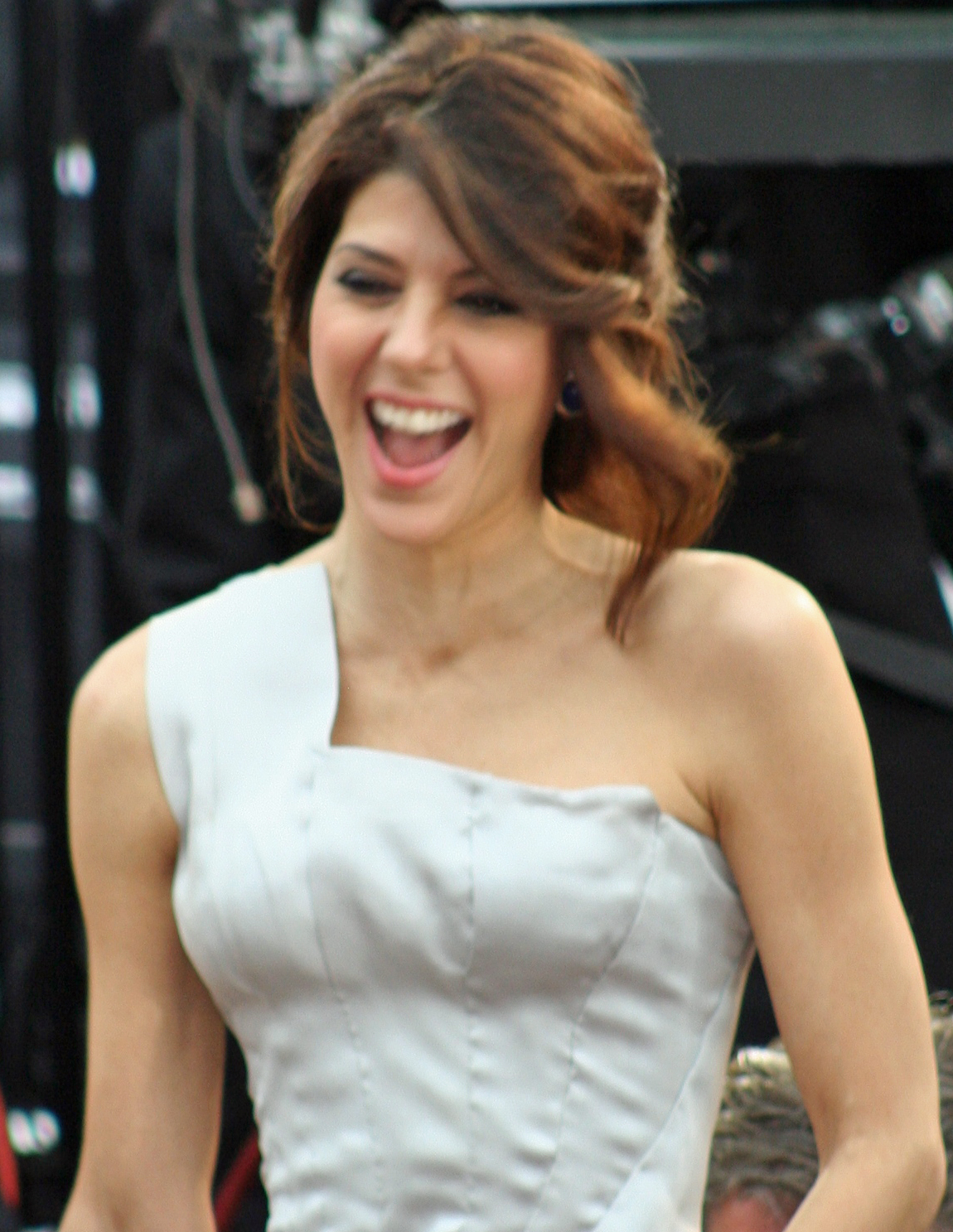
Rex Reed subjected Marisa Tomei (pictured in 2009) to a conspiracy theory regarding her win of the Best Supporting Actress Oscar for her performance in My Cousin Vinny.

After Marisa Tomei won an Oscar for Best Supporting Actress in 1992 for her work in My Cousin Vinny, Reed said publicly that she had not actually won the award, and that presenter Jack Palance had accidentally read the wrong name off the card he was reading. When it was pointed out that the card had only one name on it, Reed changed his theory to say that Palance had read the wrong name off the teleprompter, and claimed (without evidence) that the academy went along with it because they would have been embarrassed to admit that mistake in front of a huge viewing audience. Reed was publicly rebutted by the accounting firm Price Waterhouse, who said that if a presenter ever announced the wrong winner, a PwC representative would go on stage and state that the wrong result had been announced, before either stating the correct result or giving the information to someone on stage to correct it. This is what happened in 2017, when La La Land was mistakenly announced as the winner of Best Picture instead of the true recipient, Moonlight. (Note: When La La Land was incorrectly announced as the 2016 Best Picture winner instead of the actual winner, Moonlight, Price Waterhouse took the same actions to correct the mistake that they had outlined in rebutting Reed's conspiracy theory.) Roger Ebert said that Reed's conspiracy theories were false and unfair to Tomei, and that Reed owed her an apology.

In a 2005 review of the South Korean movie Oldboy, Reed wrote, "What else can you expect from a nation weaned on kimchi, a mixture of raw garlic and cabbage buried underground until it rots, dug up from the grave and then served in earthenware pots sold at the Seoul airport as souvenirs?" The Village Voice, which reported that "online forums erupted in protest" at the review, then mocked Reed by imagining him applying similar logic to films from other countries.

In a 2013 review of Identity Thief, Reed made several references to Melissa McCarthy's weight, referring to her as "tractor-sized", "humongous", "obese", and a "hippo". The review sparked backlash from prominent Hollywood figures and several notable media outlets. Film critic Richard Roeper said, "This just smacks of mean-spirited name-calling in lieu of genuine criticism." The review was referenced at the 85th Academy Awards in February 2013 by host Seth MacFarlane, who joked that Reed would review Adele for singing "Skyfall" at the ceremony. In a column for HuffPost, Candy Spelling likened Reed's review to bullying. Reed stood by his comments and stated his objection to the use of serious health problems such as obesity as comedy talking points. He dismissed the outrage as being orchestrated for publicity, but praised McCarthy for not getting involved in the matter, calling her "completely classy". McCarthy would later respond in a June 2013 interview with The New York Times, expressing surprise that the review was published, stating, "I felt really bad for someone who is swimming in so much hate. I just thought, that’s someone who’s in a really bad spot, and I am in such a happy spot. I laugh my head off every day with my husband and my kids". In a 2017 review of The Shape of Water, he referred to people with disabilities as "defective creatures".

In his later years, Reed's views were often at odds with younger critics. While he was criticised for offensive comments in reviews, he claimed that young critics often lacked knowledge about film history and black-and-white-films. Reed also claimed that American culture saw a decline during his lifetime: "I grew up when things weren't mediocre. Now they are."

Reed was a member of the New York Film Critics Circle. Reed's final review, published on October 24, 2025, was for the film Truth & Treason. His final article overall, published on December 16 of that year, was a tribute to the New York Observer founder Arthur L. Carter.

=== Factual errors in reviews ===
Reed's 2012 review for The Cabin in the Woods contained significant factual inaccuracies in his summary of the film, and exhibited a dismissive attitude towards anyone who disagreed with his negative opinion. L Magazine’s Henry Stewart noted that "his review is literally about 50 percent inaccurate—factually, objectively wrong". His professionalism was also called into question when, in addition to the factual inaccuracies, some felt he was needlessly insulting and mean-spirited towards those who enjoyed the film. In 2013, Reed reviewed V/H/S/2, despite walking out of the film within its first 20 minutes. As a result, his review was brief and incorrectly summarized Jason Eisener's segment of the horror anthology. Some felt that Reed was unprofessional, and journalist Sam Adams stated that Reed was "making a mockery of a noble profession while intelligent critics scramble for crumbs all around him". In November 2017, Reed's review of Three Billboards Outside Ebbing, Missouri included notable confusions of major plotlines, most notably erroneous interpretations of the character arcs and events of the film. In December 2017, Reed's review of The Shape of Water incorrectly referred to writer and director Guillermo del Toro as "Benecio del Toro" (apparently both confusing the director with actor Benicio del Toro, and failing to spell the latter's name correctly), and wrote that he was from Spain; the director is from Mexico and the actor is from Puerto Rico. The same year he included the film Get Out on his list of 10 Worst Films of 2017, and later sardonically stated in a CBS Sunday Morning interview, "I didn't care if all the black men are turned into robots." A writer on Sunday Morning's website noted that there were no robots in the film.

=== Acting career ===
Reed acted occasionally, such as in the movie version of Gore Vidal's Myra Breckinridge (1970). Reed also appeared in the films Superman (1978, as himself), Inchon (1981), and Irreconcilable Differences (1984). He appeared frequently as a judge on the TV game show The Gong Show in the late 1970s. Reed appeared in the 2009 documentary For the Love of Movies: The Story of American Film Criticism explaining how important film critics were in the 1970s, and complaining about the proliferation of unqualified critical voices on the internet.

== Critical style ==
Reed's film reviews are described by their blunt contrarian approach that only prioritizes personal judgements over consensus acclaim, which often delivers fiery condemnations of Hollywood mediocrity. Reed employs acerbic vivid language to eviscerate the types of films he deems artistically deficient, most notably labeling the 2023 Martin Scorsese film Killers of the Flower Moon as being exhausting and incoherent despite the film's pedigree. Reed's own style of film reviewing reflects a pugnacious independence unbound by publicist influence or deference to celebrities, positioning him as a relic of a bygone era of unrestrained criticism in the modern era of tempered discourse.

Reed's reviews contrasted sharply with the praise by the mainstream by targeting blockbusters and genre fare, most notably superhero films and films with fantastical elements, which he disdained for their formulaic execution and their lack of any real substance. In addition, his reviews highlighted the film’s narrative coherence, technical quality, and cultural impact, often drawing on nostalgia for classic Hollywood while condemning the “truckloads of mediocrity” in current cinema. For example, when reviewing more than 60 films in 2023, Reed reserved high praise for films like Christopher Nolan's Oppenheimer for their intellect rigor while savaging other films for their own stylistic excess and for their absence of their own suspense.

Reed's no-holds-barred tenor of criticism extends to a broader cultural critique, where he laments the dilution of cinematic artistry amid an era of celebrity-driven spectacle while maintaining a relentlessly acidic personality which underscores his own commitment to a more substantive evaluation over a more populist appeal. Reed's reviews serve as a polemic against current industry trends, which blends sharp-tongued invective with the demand for an elevated standard, as noted in his more frequent exocoriation of the film's overwrought direction and its incoherent plotting.

== Personal life ==
Reed lived in a two-bedroom apartment at The Dakota building in New York City, which he bought for $30,000 in 1969. He bought the apartment from royalties he earned for the film Myra Breckinridge.

Reed was gay, though he was rather private about the subject. He had a 25-year relationship with the music producer Rick Winter until Winter's death. In 2018, Reed stated, "Love is not something that I've been really good at. I think people are intimidated by people with opinions. How do you go start looking for a wife or a boyfriend or a significant other? It's too late. It would be nice, though, to find somebody who's really handy with a wheelchair, because that day is coming."

=== Shoplifting arrest and disposition ===
In February 2000, Reed was arrested for shoplifting after leaving a Tower Records in Manhattan with compact discs by Mel Tormé, Peggy Lee, and Carmen McRae in his jacket pockets. Reed, who had just purchased two other CDs, said he forgot about the other three CDs and his offer to pay for them was refused. According to Reed, several days after the arrest, Peggy Lee sent him her entire catalog of CDs, because "she was so thrilled I wanted one of her CDs enough to put myself through so much hell". The charges were later dropped.

=== Death ===
After several months of declining health, Reed died at his residence in New York City, on May 12, 2026, at age 87.

== Legacy ==
Following his death, The New York Times and The Hollywood Reporter published obituaries remarking upon Reed's "acerbic" and blunt reviews. The Hollywood Reporter noted that his reviews established Reed as the "bad boy of entertainment journalism".

Shortly after his death, Reed's close friends William Kapfner and Eric Baker launched The Rex Reed Foundation in his honor to support media, arts, journalism, and cultural storytelling in addition to nurturing future generations of creative voices.

In November 2026, Reed's apartment in The Dakota was put up for sale for $6 million, with proceedes going to The Rex Reed Foundation.

== Work ==
=== Selected filmography ===
Year	Title	Role	Notes	Ref.
1970	Myra Breckinridge	Myron Breckinridge		
1974	The Rehearsal	Actor		
1978	Superman	Himself		
1979	An Almost Perfect Affair	Himself	Uncredited	
1981	Inchon	Longfellow		
1984	Irreconcilable Differences	Entertainment Editor		

=== Bibliography ===
- Reed, Rex (1968). Do You Sleep in the Nude?. New York: New American Library. ISBN 978-0-491-00043-7.
- Reed, Rex (1969). Conversations in the Raw. New York: World. ISBN 978-0-9882322-7-3.
- Reed, Rex (1971). Big Screen, Little Screen. New York: MacMillan. ASIN B0006CUEYO. LCCN 77-123526. OCLC 1256497509.
- Reed, Rex (1974). People Are Crazy Here. New York: Delacorte Press. ISBN 978-0-440-07365-9.
- Reed, Rex (1977). Valentines & Vitriol. New York: Delacorte Press. ISBN 978-0-440-09336-7.
- Reed, Rex (1979). Travolta to Keaton. New York: William Morrow. ISBN 978-0-688-03434-4.
- Reed, Rex (1986). Personal Effects. New York: Arbor House. ISBN 978-0-441-66220-3.
- Reed, Rex (1992). Rex Reed's Guide to Movies on TV and Video, 1992-1993. Warner Books. ISBN 978-0-446-36206-1.
