= Romance Is on the Rise =

- cover art by Richard Avedon

Studio album by Genevieve Waite
- Released: July 1974
- Studio: Mediasound, New York City
- Label: Paramour Record Corporation
- Producer: John Phillips

Romance Is on the Rise is an album released in July 1974 by South African actress, singer and model Genevieve Waite. It was produced by her then husband, John Phillips. The album was fairly well received and in 1977 it made number No 98 on Paul Gambaccini's list of the Top 200 Albums of All Time.

An electro-dub cover of the song "Biting My Nails", released in 1987 by Renegade Soundwave, became an underground dance hit.

== Track listing ==
1974 vinyl edition
No.	Title	Writer(s)	Length
1.	"Love Is Coming Back"	Genevieve Waite	2:28
2.	"Transient Friends"	John Phillips	2:48
3.	"Times of Love"	John Phillips	2:27
4.	"Trashy Rumors"	Michelle Phillips	2:10
5.	"Slumming on Park Avenue"	Irving Berlin	2:33
6.	"Biting My Nails"	Genevieve Waite	2:45
7.	"Danny"	Genevieve Waite	3:05
8.	"White Cadillac"	Genevieve Waite	3:00
9.	"American Man on the Moon"	John Phillips	2:28
10.	"Girls"	John Phillips	4:13

2005 CD bonus tracks
No.	Title	Writer(s)	Length
11.	"Mr. Blue"		3:30
12.	"Pink Gin and Lime"		3:21
13.	"Femme Fatale"	Lou Reed	3:24
14.	"Saying Goodbye"		4:18

== Personnel ==
- Genevieve Waite - lead vocals
- David Spinozza, John Tropea - lead guitar
- "Dr" Eric Hord, John Phillips - acoustic guitar
- Andy Muson, Russell George - bass guitar
- Ken Asher - keyboards
- Rick Marotta - drums
- David Spinozza, John Phillips, Ken Asher - orchestral arrangements

Technical

- John Phillips – producer
- Richard Avedon – cover photography
