= Joanna (1968 film) =

1968 British film by Michael Sarne

- Film poster
- Directed by: Michael Sarne
- Written by: Michael Sarne
- Produced by: Michael Laughlin
- Starring: Geneviève Waïte; Christian Doermer; Calvin Lockhart; Donald Sutherland; Glenna Forster-Jones
- Cinematography: Walter Lassally
- Edited by: Norman Wanstall
- Music by: Rod McKuen
- Production company: Laughlin Films
- Distributed by: 20th Century Fox
- Release dates: 24 November 1968 (USA); December 1968 (UK)
- Running time: 108 minutes
- Country: United Kingdom
- Language: English
- Budget: $1.2 million
- Box office: $1.3 million (US/ Canada rentals)

Joanna is a 1968 British comedy-drama film directed and written by Michael Sarne, and starring Geneviève Waïte, Christian Doermer, Calvin Lockhart and Donald Sutherland.

== Plot ==
Joanna, a wide-eyed, naïve art student in Swinging London, has a romantic fling with her teacher, aspiring painter Hendrik Casson. She eventually leaves him for impoverished Dominic while her gold-digging friend Beryl takes up with the quite wealthy Lord Sanderson.

They travel to Sanderson's second home in Morocco, where he reveals that he has a terminal illness and sponsors an exhibit of Hendrik's paintings. Meanwhile, Dominic dumps Joanna because she refuses to stop seeing other men.

Joanna's next lover, Beryl's brother Gordon, impregnates her. Beaten by criminals to whom he is in debt, Gordon takes revenge by killing one of them. He is convicted of murder and sent to prison, leaving Joanna alone with their expected child.

== Cast ==
- Geneviève Waïte as Joanna
- Christian Doermer as Hendrik Casson
- Calvin Lockhart as Gordon
- Donald Sutherland as Lord Peter Sanderson
- Glenna Forster-Jones as Beryl
- David Scheur as Dominic Endersley
- Marda Vanne as Granny
- Geoffrey Morris as the father
- Michelle Cook as Margot
- Manning Wilson as Inspector
- Clifton Jones as black detective
- Dan Caulfield as white detective
- Michael Chow as Lefty
- Anthony Ainley as Bruce
- Jane Bradbury as Angela
- Fiona Lewis as Miranda De Hyde
- Michael Sarne as film director
- Caroline Munro (uncredited)

== Production ==
Sarne had an affair with Waïte during the making of the film and was physically violent towards her during the shoot. In a 1968 interview with New York magazine, he said that hitting Waïte was "the only way to direct this girl, otherwise she's very cheeky. She has to be shown. I mean she knew that unless she behaved herself she'd get slapped down. One is polite to girls so long as they behave themselves". He continued saying he "didn't punch her around as corrective punishment. Only when she annoyed me".

Waïte was paid £2,000 for her work on the film (equivalent to £43,812 in 2023).

Candice Bergen filmed a small scene but it was not included in the final cut due to problems with the studio, 20th Century Fox, and Equity, the British actors' union, because Bergen did not have work permit.

In a 1968 article in The Illustrated London News about film financing in the United Kingdom, Robert Lacey highlighted Joanna as an example of a British film that should have received financing from British rather than American companies. Sarne said that "With an American company you're artistically free … To make a good film you need a touch of the romantic, a streak of the visionary, and you can't have that with your financier tripping over your heels all the time".

== Release ==
It was listed to compete at the 1968 Cannes Film Festival. The festival was cancelled due to the events of May 1968 in France. The film was still shown in an afternoon performance and a premier showing at Cannes.

== Reception ==
=== Box office ===
According to Fox records, the film required $3,800,000 in rentals to break even, and by 11 December 1970 had made $1,900,000.

=== Critical reception ===
The Monthly Film Bulletin wrote: "A tiresome tale for tiny tots about a country mouse who comes to town and has a fine old time before returning sadder and possibly wiser to Daddy. This unnecessarily protracted punishing of a very dead quadruped rejoices in a tediously childish heroine, some very discreet nudity, a fairly neatly observed piece of police routine, tepid dream sequences, and some distinguished photography from Walter Lassally. The actors do what they can in the circumstances, and the failure of most of them to make any impression can be excused on the grounds of inexperience. It is a little more difficult to find anything to say in favour of the director, Michael Sarne, who seems uncertain whether he wants to make his mark as the British Lelouch or the embalmer of Swinging London."

=== Accolades ===
The film was nominated for the Golden Globe for Best Foreign Language Film.
