= Mass (band) =

- Origin: England
- Genres: Post-punk
- Years active: 1980–1981
- Labels: 4AD
- Past members: Gary Asquith; Mick Allen; Mark Cox; Danny Briottet

Mass were an English post-punk band. The band consisted of Gary Asquith, Michael Allen, Mark Cox and Danny Briottet. Asquith, Allen and Cox had been members of Rema-Rema. Mass released a 7" single, "You and I", in 1980 on 4AD record label. They released the Labour of Love LP in 1981, also on 4AD, which saw comparisons made with Joy Division and The Birthday Party. It spent five weeks on the UK Indie Chart, peaking at number 19.

Mass broke up in 1981. Allen and Cox formed The Wolfgang Press in 1983, while Asquith and Briottet went on to form Renegade Soundwave in 1986. Labour of Love was reissued on CD in November 2005, with the two tracks from the single included. It was reissued on vinyl by Desire Records in 2011.

== Discography ==
=== Albums ===
- Labour of Love (May 1981), 4AD

"Mass"
"Why"
"III"
"Why"
"Isn't Life Nice"
"Elephant Talk"
"F.A.H.T.C.F."
"Cross Purposes"
"Innocence"

=== Singles ===
- "You and I"/"Cabbage" (August 1980), 4AD
