= John Phillips (musician) =

American musician (1935–2001)

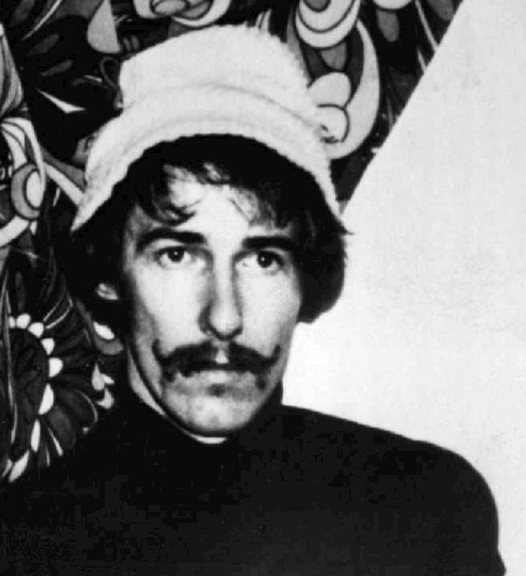
- Phillips in 1967
- Born: John Edmund Andrew Phillips; August 30, 1935; Parris Island, South Carolina, U.S.
- Died: March 18, 2001 (aged 65); Los Angeles, California, U.S.
- Other names: Papa John; Johnny Phillips; Phillips; JP
- Occupations: Singer; musician; songwriter
- Years active: 1960–2001
- Spouses: Susan Adams (m. 1957; div. 1962) Michelle Gilliam (m. 1962; div. 1969) Genevieve Waite (m. 1972; div. 1985) Farnaz Arasteh (m. 1995)
- Children: 5, including Mackenzie, Chynna and Bijou
- Musical career
- Genres: Folk rock; pop
- Instruments: Guitar; vocals
- Label: Dunhill

John Edmund Andrew Phillips (August 30, 1935 – March 18, 2001) was an American musician, singer, and songwriter. He was the leader of the vocal group the Mamas & the Papas and remains frequently referred to as Papa John Phillips. In addition to writing the majority of the group's songs, he wrote "San Francisco (Be Sure to Wear Flowers in Your Hair)" in 1967 for former Journeymen bandmate Scott McKenzie, and the oft-covered "Me and My Uncle", which was a favorite in the repertoire of the Grateful Dead. Phillips was one of the chief organizers of the 1967 Monterey Pop Festival.

== Early life ==
Phillips was born on August 30, 1935 on Parris Island, South Carolina. His father, Claude Andrew Phillips, was a retired United States Marine Corps officer. On his way home from France following World War I, Claude Phillips managed to win a tavern located in Oklahoma from another Marine during a poker game. His mother, Edna Gertrude (née Gaines), who had English ancestry, met his father in Oklahoma. According to Phillips' autobiography, Papa John, his father was a heavy drinker who suffered from poor health.

Phillips grew up in Alexandria, Virginia, where he was inspired by Marlon Brando to be "street tough". From 1942 to 1946, he attended Linton Hall Military School in Bristow, Virginia. According to his autobiography, he "hated the place," citing "inspections," and "beatings," and recalls that "nuns even watched us take showers". He formed a musical group of teenage boys, who sang doo-wop songs. He played basketball at George Washington High School, now George Washington Middle School in Alexandria, Virginia, where he graduated in 1953, and gained an appointment to the United States Naval Academy. However, he resigned during his first (plebe) year. Phillips then attended Hampden–Sydney College, a liberal-arts college for men in Hampden Sydney, Virginia, but dropped out in 1959.

== Career ==
=== Early career ===
Phillips traveled to New York in the early 1960s in the hope of gaining a record contract. His first band, the Journeymen, was a folk trio, with Scott McKenzie and Dick Weissman. They were fairly successful, putting out three albums, and had several appearances on the 1960s TV show Hootenanny. All three albums, as well as a compilation titled Best of the Journeymen, have since been reissued on CD. He developed his craft in Greenwich Village, during the American folk music revival, and met future Mamas & the Papas members Denny Doherty and Cass Elliot there around that time. Lyrics in the group's song "Creeque Alley" describe this period.

=== The Mamas and the Papas ===
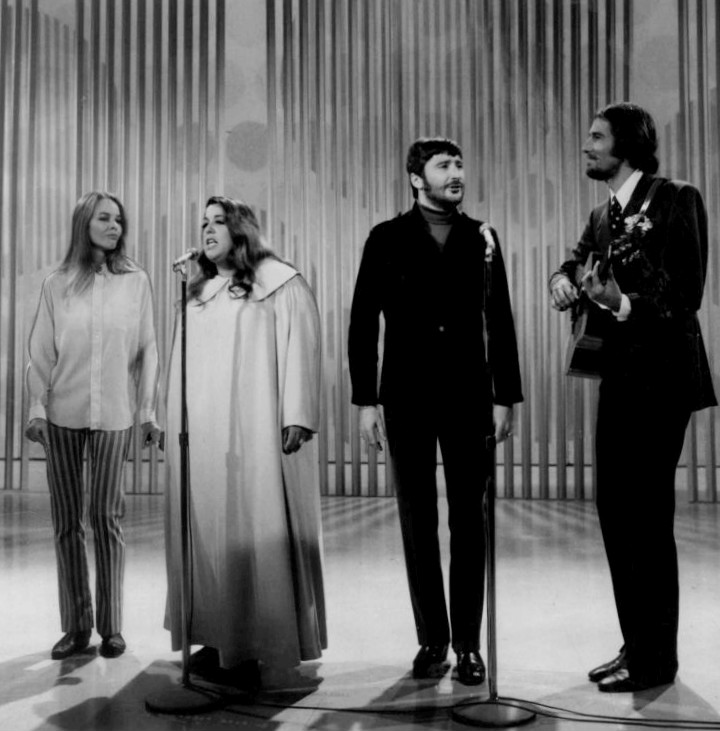
The Mamas and the Papas in 1968: Michelle Phillips, Cass Elliot, Denny Doherty, John Phillips

Phillips was the primary songwriter and musical arranger of the Mamas and the Papas. In a 1968 interview, Phillips described some of his arrangements as "well-arranged two-part harmony moving in opposite directions". After being signed to Dunhill, they had six Billboard Top Ten hits – "California Dreamin'", "Monday, Monday", "I Saw Her Again", "Creeque Alley", "Words of Love" and "Dedicated to the One I Love".

Phillips helped promote the Monterey International Pop Music Festival held June 16– 18, 1967, in Monterey, California; he performed with the Mamas and the Papas as part of the event as well. The festival was planned in just seven weeks, and was developed as a way to validate rock music as an art form in the way jazz and folk were regarded. It was the first major pop-rock music event in history. He also co-produced the film Monterey Pop (1968) with the group's producer Lou Adler.

John and Michelle Phillips became Hollywood celebrities, living in the Hollywood Hills and socializing with stars such as Jack Nicholson, Warren Beatty, and Roman Polanski. The Mamas and the Papas broke up in 1968 largely because Cass Elliot wanted to go solo and because of personal problems between Phillips, his wife Michelle, and Denny Doherty, including Michelle's affair with Doherty. As Michelle Phillips later recounted, "Cass confronted me and said 'I don't get it. You could have any man you want. Why would you take mine?'" Michelle Phillips was fired briefly in 1966 for having affairs with Gene Clark and Doherty. She was replaced for two months by Jill Gibson, their producer Lou Adler's girlfriend. Although Phillips was forgiven and asked to return to the group, the personal problems continued until the group split. Elliot went on to have a successful solo career until her death in 1974.

=== Solo career ===
Phillips released his first solo album, John, the Wolf King of L.A., in 1970. The album was not commercially successful, although it did include the minor hit "Mississippi", and Phillips began to withdraw from the limelight as his use of narcotics increased.

He teamed up with Adler again to produce Robert Altman's 1970 film Brewster McCloud and also wrote the songs for the film.

Phillips produced his third wife Genevieve Waite's album Romance Is on the Rise, and wrote music for films. Between 1969 and 1974, Phillips and Waïte worked on a script and composed over 30 songs for a space-themed musical called Man on the Moon, which was eventually produced by Andy Warhol but played for just two days in New York after receiving disastrous opening night reviews.

Phillips moved to London in 1973, where Mick Jagger encouraged him to record another solo album. It was to be released on Rolling Stones Records and funded by RSR distributor Atlantic Records. Jagger and Keith Richards produced and played on the album, as well as former Stone Mick Taylor and future Stone Ronnie Wood. The project was derailed by Phillips's increasing use of cocaine and heroin, which he injected, by his own admission, "almost every fifteen minutes for two years". In 2001, the tracks of the Half Stoned or The Lost Album album were released as Pay Pack & Follow a few months after Phillips's death. In 1975 Phillips, still living in London, was commissioned to create the soundtrack to the Nicolas Roeg film The Man Who Fell to Earth, starring David Bowie. Phillips asked Mick Taylor to help out; the film was released in 1976.

In 1981, Phillips was convicted of drug trafficking. Subsequently, he and his daughter Mackenzie made the rounds in the media in an anti-drug campaign, helping to reduce his prison time to a month in jail, of which he spent three weeks (one week off for good behavior) at Allenwood Prison Camp, in Allenwood, Pennsylvania. Upon his release, he re-formed the Mamas and the Papas with Mackenzie Phillips, Spanky McFarlane (of the group Spanky and Our Gang) and Denny Doherty. Throughout the rest of his life, Phillips toured with various incarnations of this group.

His autobiography, Papa John, was published in 1986.

With Terry Melcher, Mike Love, and former Journeymen colleague Scott McKenzie, he co-wrote the number-one single "Kokomo" for the Beach Boys. The song was used in the 1988 film Cocktail and was nominated for a Grammy Award (Best Song Written specifically for a Motion Picture or Television) and a Golden Globe Award for Best Song.

== Personal life and death ==
Phillips married Susan Adams of a wealthy Virginia family on May 7, 1957. They had a son, Jeffrey, and a daughter, Mackenzie.

While touring California with The Journeymen, Phillips met teenager Holly Michelle Gilliam, with whom he had an extramarital affair. The affair caused the dissolution of his marriage to Adams; subsequently he married Michelle on December 31, 1962. The couple had one child together, Chynna Phillips, vocalist of the 1990s pop trio Wilson Phillips. Denny Doherty and Michelle started an affair in 1965. Phillips and Michelle divorced in May 1969.

Phillips married his third wife, actress and model Genevieve Waite, on January 30, 1972. The couple had two children, Tamerlane and Bijou Phillips. Phillips and Waite divorced in 1985.

Phillips married his fourth wife, painter and artist Farnaz Arasteh, on February 3, 1995.

=== Health ===
His years of drug addiction resulted in health problems that required a liver transplant in 1992. Several months later, photographs of him drinking alcohol in a bar in Palm Springs, California, were published in the National Enquirer. On March 14, 1994, during his first Howard Stern Show appearance since the transplant, he said, "Occasionally I have a drink", when asked if he still drank.

=== Sexual abuse allegations ===
In September 2009, eight years after Phillips's death, his eldest daughter Mackenzie alleged that she and her father had a 10-year abusive and incestuous relationship. In her memoir High on Arrival, Mackenzie wrote that the relationship began in 1979 when she was 19 years old. She said that the abuse began after her father raped her while they were both under the influence of heavy narcotics on the eve of her first marriage. On The Oprah Winfrey Show on September 23, 2009, Mackenzie Phillips said that John injected her with cocaine and heroin. According to Phillips, the sexual abuse ended when she became pregnant and did not know who had fathered the child; she said these doubts led her to have an abortion her father paid for. She stated, "I never let him touch me again."

Genevieve Waite, John's wife at the time, denied the allegations, saying they were inconsistent with his character. Michelle Phillips, John's second wife, also stated that she had "every reason to believe [Mackenzie's account is] untrue". Chynna Phillips, Michelle Phillips's daughter, stated that she believed Mackenzie's claims and that Mackenzie first told her about the sexual assault during a phone conversation in 1997, approximately 11 years after the events had ended. Bijou Phillips, Mackenzie's half-sister from her father's marriage to Genevieve Waite, has stated that Mackenzie informed her of the sexual abuse when Bijou was 13 years old, and the information had a devastating effect on Bijou's teenage years, stripping her of her innocence and leaving her "wary of [her] father". However, she went on to add, "I'm 29 now, I've talked to everyone who was around during that time, I've asked the hard questions. I do not believe my sister. Our father [was] many things. This is not one of them." Jessica Woods, daughter of Denny Doherty, said that her father had told her that he knew "the awful truth" and that he was "horrified at what John had done".

=== Death ===
Phillips spent his last years in Palm Springs, California, with Farnaz Arasteh, his fourth wife. On March 18, 2001, he died of heart failure in Los Angeles at the age of 65, days after completing recording sessions for a new album. He is interred at Forest Lawn Cemetery in Cathedral City, near Palm Springs where later his third wife Genevieve Waite was buried as well.

== Awards and honors ==
In 1996, a Golden Palm Star on the Palm Springs, California, Walk of Stars was dedicated to Phillips.

The Mamas and the Papas were inducted into the Rock 'n' Roll Hall of Fame on January 12, 1998, and the Vocal Group Hall of Fame in 2000.

== Discography ==
=== Singles ===
Year	Title	Catalog Number	US	US A/C	US Country	Album
1970	"Mississippi"; B-side: "April Anne"	Dunhill 4236	#32	#13	#58	John Phillips
1972	"Revolution on Vacation"; B-side: "Cup of Tea"	Columbia 4-45737				Non-album track

=== Solo ===
Solo work
Year	Name	Type	Label	Additional artist(s)	Notes
1970	John Phillips (John, the Wolf King of L.A.)	Album	Dunhill Records	The backing musicians included members of Wrecking Crew.	Released as part of the John Phillips Presents series of CDs when it was reissued in 2006.
1970	Brewster McCloud	Soundtrack	MGM Records	Merry Clayton on vocals.	CD reissued in 2000.
2001	Pay Pack & Follow	Album	Eagle Rock / Red Ink Records	Mick Jagger on vocals, Keith Richards, Mick Taylor, and Ron Wood on guitar.	Recorded 1973–1979, but released one month after his death in April 2001.
2001	Phillips 66	Album	Eagle Rock / Red Ink Records	Final recording.	Released in August 2001.
2008	Pussycat	Album	Varèse Vintage	Produced by The Glimmer Twins with guitars by Mick Taylor and Ron Wood.	Recorded 1976–77, mixed 1978 and released in September 2008. Released as part of the John Phillips Presents series of CDs.
2009	Andy Warhol Presents Man on the Moon	Musical	Varèse Sarabande	Written by John Phillips and produced by Andy Warhol and directed by Paul Morrissey.	1975 musical. Released as part of the John Phillips Presents series of CDs.
2016	The Man Who Fell to Earth	Soundtrack	UMC	Score produced with Stomu Yamashta and the Bournemouth Symphony Orchestra.	Unreleased until the 40th anniversary.

=== Compilations ===
- 2007: Jack of Diamonds
- 2010: Many Mamas, Many Papas
