= Genevieve Waite =

South African actress, singer, and model (1948–2019)

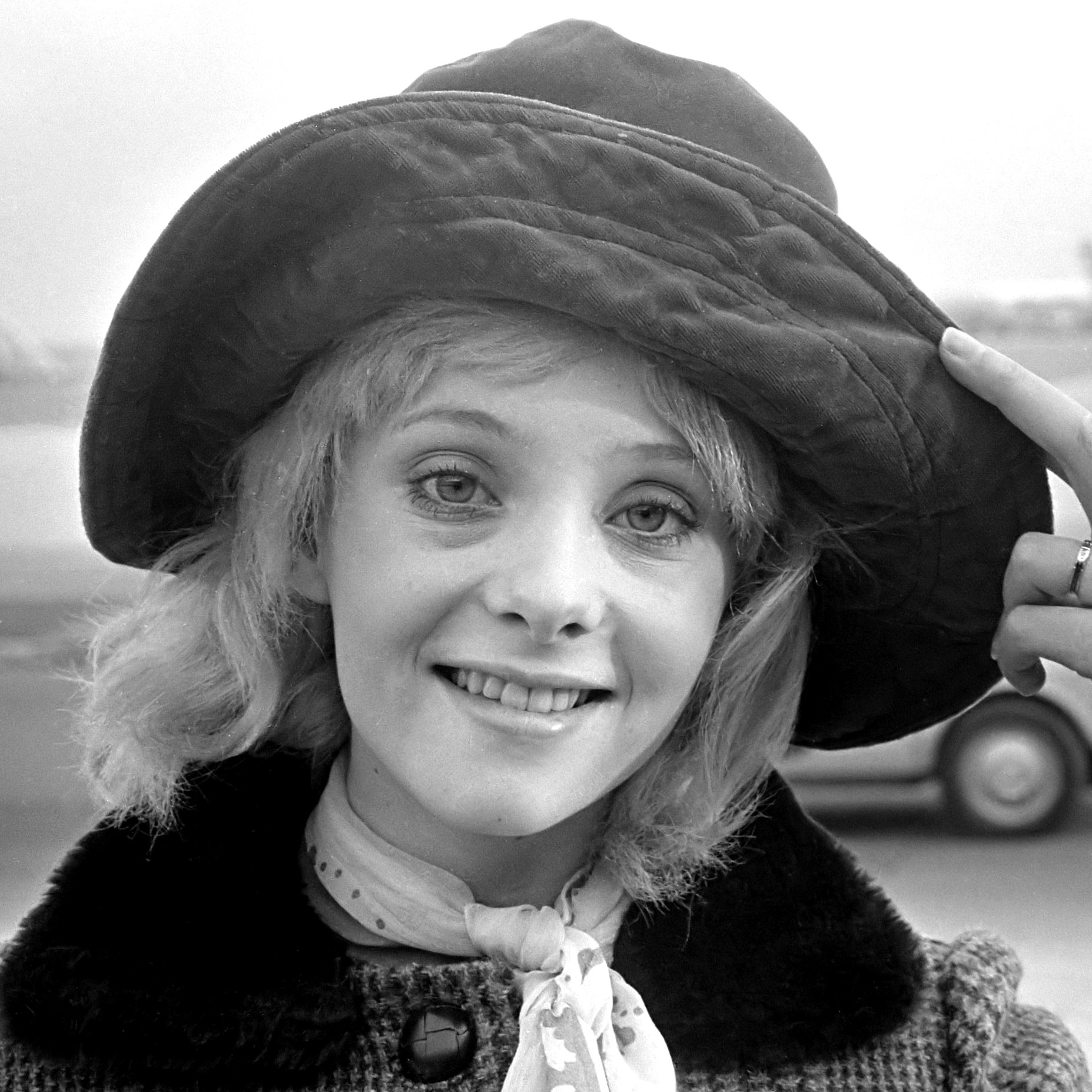
- Waite in 1969
- Born: Genevieve Joyce Weight; 13 February 1948; Cape Town, South Africa
- Died: 18 May 2019 (aged 71); Los Angeles, California, U.S.
- Occupations: Actress; singer; model
- Spouse(s): Matthew Reich (m. 1968; div. 1970) John Phillips (m. 1972; div. 1985) Norman Buntaine (separated)
- Children: Tamerlane Phillips; Bijou Phillips

Geneviève Joyce Waïte (born Genevieve Joyce Weight, 13 February 1948 – 18 May 2019) was a South African actress, singer, and model. Her best-known acting role was the title character in the 1968 film Joanna. In 1974, she released her only solo album, Romance Is on the Rise, which was produced by her husband, John Phillips of the Mamas & the Papas. Her singing voice has been described as "Betty Boop crossed with Billie Holiday". In 1975, she starred in the short-lived Broadway musical, Man on the Moon, which she co-wrote with Phillips.

== Early life ==
Geneviève Weight was born on February 13, 1948, in Cape Town, South Africa. her family moved to Johannesburg when she was a baby.

As a teenager, she had appeared in a few South African films before relocating to England in 1966 to pursue a career as a fashion model.

== Career ==
Weight changed her surname to Waite. She portrayed the title character in the film Joanna (1968), which tells the story of a young art student in London in the swinging 1960s who gets involved with a black nightclub owner (played by Calvin Lockhart). Because it showed an interracial relationship at a time when it was still illegal in some places, like Waite's home country of South Africa, which at the time still under apartheid, the movie caused controversy.

She appears in the films Myra Breckinridge and Move, both released in 1970.

Waite was photographed by Richard Avedon for Vogue magazine in 1971.

In 1974, Waite recorded her only album as a singer, which was produced and co-written by her husband, John Phillips of the Mamas & the Papas. The album, Romance Is on the Rise, was released on Phillips' label Paramour, and featured a cover image of Waite as a Vargas girl shot by Richard Avedon. A 2011 release of the album on CD includes her cover version of the Velvet Underground song "Femme Fatale" as a bonus track.

In 1975, Waite starred in a short-lived Broadway musical, Man on the Moon, which she co-wrote with John Phillips. The set was produced by pop artist Andy Warhol.

Her last movie role was in Short Distance (1989).

== Personal life ==
Waite married Matthew Reich, who appeared in Andy Warhol’s film ‘Bad’ and was known latterly by the nickname ‘Crazy Matty’ in The Andy Warhol Diaries, on 10 December 1968; They later divorced.

Waite then married John Phillips, on 31 January 1972, at a Chinese restaurant in Los Angeles' Chinatown by a one-legged Buddhist priest. They had two children: Tamerlane Phillips (b. 1971) and former actress Bijou Phillips (b. 1980). Their marriage was marred by drug abuse. Waite, John Phillips, and his daughter Mackenzie Philips went for treatment at a New Jersey facility in 1980. In 1981, Philips told People magazine: "I had an insatiable cocaine habit. Genevieve and I were doing a quarter ounce or half ounce a day. We were also taking 60 Dilaudids [a semi-synthetic opioid] a day, 160 milligrams of morphine, heroin and everything else. The only other person I ever heard about who took as many drugs as we did was Elvis." The couple divorced in 1985.

Waite then married Norman Buntaine; they later separated.

== Death ==
On 18 May 2019, Waite died in her sleep in Los Angeles, California. Her daughter, Bijou, announced her mother's death several days later. She is interred at Forest Lawn Cemetery in Cathedral City, near Palm Springs, along with her ex-husband John Phillips.

== Filmography ==
- Joanna (1968) as "Joanna".
- Move (1970) as "The Girl"
- Myra Breckinridge (1970) as the "Dental patient" (uncredited)
- Short Distance (1989) as Mona
