= Rema-Rema =

English post-punk band

- Origin: England
- Genres: Post-punk; new musick; art punk; noise rock; industrial rock; punk funk
- Years active: c. 1979– December 1980
- Labels: 4AD
- Past members: Gary Asquith; Marco Pirroni; Mick Allen; Mark Cox; Dorothy Max Prior

Rema-Rema were an English post-punk group consisting of Gary Asquith (guitar/vocals), Marco Pirroni (guitar), Michael Allen (bass/vocals), Mark Cox (keyboards) and Dorothy Prior –known as "Max"– (drums), .

The group were signed to the English indie label 4AD, and broke up in December 1980. They are today best known for their song "Fond Reflections", reinterpreted as "Fond Affections" and sung by Cindy Sharp for This Mortal Coil's 1984 album It'll End in Tears.

== History ==
Asquith and Allen went to the same school. After his departure from punk band The Models, Allen asked Asquith to join in a new project, called Rema-Rema after a mondegreen of the reversed vocals in Cabaret Voltaire's "Eastern Mantra", from their record Three Mantras. The group dissolved when Marco Pirroni joined Adam and the Ants.

Pirroni had been an original member of Siouxsie and the Banshees, and was a member of Adam and the Ants. Asquith, Allen and Cox went on to form another short-lived band Mass, which then split up to form Renegade Soundwave (Asquith) and The Wolfgang Press (Allen and Cox). Max later joined Psychic TV, and also recorded a single "I Confess" under the name Dorothy, co-written with Alex Fergusson, released on Industrial Records in 1980.

Their sole four-track EP, Wheel in the Roses (released 1980 on 4AD), featured one side of studio recordings and another of live material. Their songs "Fond Affections" and "Rema-Rema" were later covered by This Mortal Coil and Big Black respectively. Two live tracks from the Acklam Hall gig of April 1979, "Why Ask Why?" and "Christopher" appeared on the tape only release, The Men with the Deadly Dreams, on White Stains in 1981.

In 2022, a documentary about the group, What You Could Not Visualise, was directed by Italian-Canadian filmmaker Marco Porsia and premiered on 10 November 2022 at the Doc N Roll Film Festival in London.

== Discography ==
Releases

- Wheel in the Roses EP (1980)
- Fond Reflections 2x CD (2019)

Compilation appearances

- "Feedback Song" on Natures Mortes – Still Lives (1981)
- "Rema Rema" on Silhouettes and Statues: A Gothic Revolution 1978–1986 (2017)

== Sources ==
- Aston, Martin (2013). Facing the Other Way: The Story of 4AD. London: The Friday Project. ISBN 978-0-00-748961-9.
