= Men at Work discography =

Cataloguing of published recordings by Men at Work

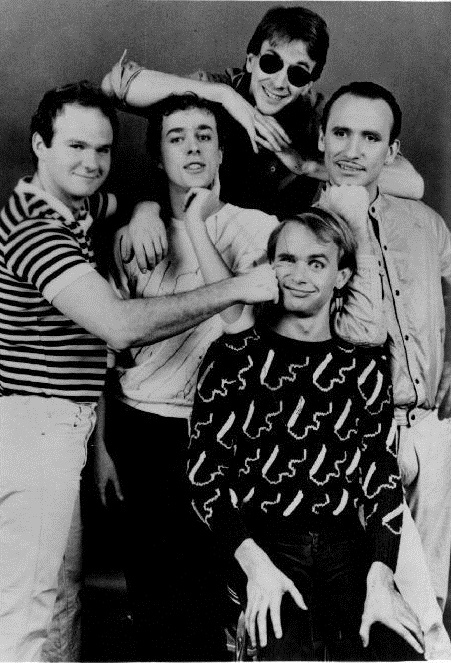
- Men at Work in 1983
- Studio albums: 3
- Extended plays: 3
- Live albums: 3
- Compilation albums: 3+
- Singles: 14
- Video albums: 3
- Music videos: 12

This article presents the discography of all albums and singles released by the Australian pop rock group Men at Work. It includes three studio albums, three live albums, numerous compilation albums, three extended plays, 14 singles, three video albums and 12 music videos.

== Albums ==
=== Studio albums ===
Title	Album details	Chart peak positions						Certifications (sales thresholds)
Title	Album details	AUS	NZ	NOR	SWE	UK	US	Certifications (sales thresholds)
Business as Usual	Released: 9 November 1981; Label: Columbia (SBP 237700); Formats: CD, cassette, LP	1	1	1	15	1	1	AUS: 4× Platinum; BPI: Platinum; RIAA: 6× Platinum
Cargo	Released: 2 May 1983; Label: Columbia (SBP 237833); Formats: CD, cassette, LP	1	2	4	8	8	3	AUS: Platinum; BPI: Gold; RIAA: 3× Platinum
Two Hearts	Released: 23 April 1985; Label: CBS (SBP 8062)); Formats: CD, cassette, LP	16	—	—	37	—	50	RIAA: Gold
"—" denotes releases that did not chart or were not released in that territory.

=== Live albums ===
Title	Album details
Brazil	Released: 1998; Label: Columbia, Legacy (CK 65732)
Hard Labour	Released: 2019
Live in Christchurch 1982	Released: 1 August 2020; Format: CD (limited), DD, streaming; Label: Men at Work, Black Box Records/ MGM Distribution

=== Major compilations ===
Title	Album details	Chart peak positions		Certifications
Title	Album details	AUS	NZ	Certifications
'81–'85	Released: November 1985; Label: Columbia (SBP 82113); Formats: CD, cassette, LP; Note: re-released in 1992 as The Works	42	—	ARIA: Platinum
Contraband: The Best of Men at Work	Released: 1995; Label: Columbia, Legacy (484011 2); Formats: CD, cassette	—	36	
The Essential Men at Work	Released: 2003; Label: Columbia, Legacy (5202492000); Formats: CD	—	—	

== Extended plays ==
Title	Details
Overtime	Released: 1983; Label: Epic (DA 4119); Formats: CD
Solid Gold	Released: 1989; Label: CBS (654850 3); Formats: CD, mini
Still Life EP	Released: 2014; Label: ATV (EPC3372709); Formats: 12"

== Singles ==
Year	Title	Peak chart positions										Certifications (sales thresholds)	Album
Year	Title	AUS	CAN	GER	IRE	NED	NOR	NZ	UK	US	US Rock	Certifications (sales thresholds)	Album
1980	"Keypunch Operator" b/w "Down Under" (original version)	—	—	—	—	—	—	—	—	—	—		Non-album single
1981	"Who Can It Be Now?"	2	8	71	18	49	—	45	45	1	46	AUS: Gold; BPI: Silver; RMNZ: Platinum; MC: Gold	Business as Usual
1981	"Down Under"	1	1	9	1	2	2	1	1	1	1	AUS: Gold; BPI: 3× Platinum; RMNZ: 6× Platinum; MC: Gold; RIAA: Platinum	Business as Usual
1982	"Be Good Johnny"	8	19	—	—	—	—	3	78	—	3		Business as Usual
1982	"Dr. Heckyll & Mr. Jive"	6	26	—	25	—	—	16	31	28	12		Cargo
1983	"Overkill"	5	6	30	9	15	5	24	21	3	3	MC: Gold	Cargo
1983	"It's a Mistake"	34	26	19	11	—	—	43	33	6	27		Cargo
1983	"High Wire"	89	—	—	—	—	—	—	—	—	23		Cargo
1985	"Everything I Need"	37	—	—	—	—	—	—	174	47	28		Two Hearts
1985	"Maria"	—	—	—	—	—	—	—	—	—	—		Two Hearts
1985	"Hard Luck Story"	—	—	—	—	—	—	—	—	—	—		Two Hearts
1985	"Sail to You"	—	—	—	—	—	—	—	—	—	—		Two Hearts
1998	"The Longest Night"	—	—	—	—	—	—	—	—	—	—		Brazil
2000	"Down Under" (re-issue)	69	—	—	—	—	—	—	—	—	—		Business as Usual
"—" denotes releases that did not chart

== Videography ==
=== Video albums ===
- Live in London, Ontario... (1981, VHS)
- Live in San Francisco... Or Was It Berkeley? (1984, VHS/Beta)
- Live in San Bernardino (2010, DVD)

=== Music videos ===
Year	Title	Album
1981	"Who Can It Be Now?"	Business as Usual
1981	"Down Under"	Business as Usual
1982	"Be Good Johnny"	Business as Usual
1982	"Dr. Heckyll & Mr. Jive"	Cargo
1983	"Overkill"	Cargo
1983	"It's a Mistake"	Cargo
1983	"High Wire"	Cargo
1985	"Everything I Need"	Two Hearts
1985	"Maria"	Two Hearts
1985	"Hard Luck Story"	Two Hearts
1985	"Sail to You"	Two Hearts
1985	"Still Life"	Two Hearts
