= The Essential Men at Work =

Greatest hits album by Men at Work
- Released: 2003
- Recorded: 1981–1985
- Genre: Rock
- Length: 53:30
- Label: Columbia; Legacy
- Producer: Peter McIan, Colin Hay, Greg Ham

Men at Work chronology
| Super Hits (2000) | The Essential Men at Work (2003) | Works (Best Of) Men at Work (2004) |

The Essential Men at Work is the eighth compilation album by Australian band Men at Work, released in 2003. It was released by Sony BMG, as part of The Essential series. The album includes 14 tracks from Men at Work three studio albums.

== Reception ==
Professional ratings
Review scores
| Source | Rating |
|---|---|
| AllMusic | 4/5 stars |

Matt Collar of AllMusic stated "The Essential Men at Work features 14 of the iconic '80s band's most memorable tracks" and claims "this is about all the Men at Work you'll ever need.

== Track listing ==
All tracks are written by Colin Hay, except where noted.

| No. | Title | Writer(s) | Original album | Length |
|---|---|---|---|---|
| 1. | "Down Under" | Hay, Ron Strykert | Business as Usual (1981) | 3:43 |
| 2. | "Who Can It Be Now?" | | Business as Usual | 3:23 |
| 3. | "It's a Mistake" | | Cargo (1983) | 4:44 |
| 4. | "Be Good Johnny" | Hay, Greg Ham | Business as Usual | 3:37 |
| 5. | "High Wire" | | Cargo | 3:03 |
| 6. | "Underground" | | Business as Usual | 3:06 |
| 7. | "Blue for You" | | Cargo | 3:56 |
| 8. | "Maria" | | Two Hearts (1985) | 4:37 |
| 9. | "Man with Two Hearts" | | Two Hearts | 3:56 |
| 10. | "I Can See It In Your Eyes" | | Business as Usual | 3:30 |
| 11. | "Overkill" | Hay, Ham | Cargo | 3:47 |
| 12. | "Dr. Heckyll & Mr. Jive" | | Cargo | 4:41 |
| 13. | "Still Life" | Ham | Two Hearts | 3:49 |
| 14. | "Everything I Need" | | Two Hearts | 3:37 |
| Total length: | | | | 53:30 |

== Release history ==
| Country | Date | Label | Format | Catalog |
|---|---|---|---|---|
| Australia | 2003 | Columbia Records, Legacy Records | CD | 104230 |
