= Contraband: The Best of Men at Work =

Greatest hits album by Men at Work
- Released: 1996
- Recorded: 1981–1984
- Genre: Pop rock
- Length: 1:03:52
- Label: Columbia, Legacy
- Producer: Peter McIan, Colin Hay, Greg Ham

Men at Work chronology
The Works (1992)	Contraband: The Best of Men at Work (1996)	Brazil (1998)

Contraband: The Best of Men at Work is the third compilation album by Australian pop rock band Men at Work. It was released in 1996. The album includes 16 tracks from the band's three studio albums. The album reached number 36 on the Official New Zealand Music Chart. It is the first and only album release to feature the rare B-side live version of 'I Like To'.

== Reception ==
Professional ratings
Review scores
Source	Rating
AllMusic	4/5 stars

Stephen Thomas Erlewine from AllMusic said the album does a terrific job of consolidating all of their highlights onto one disc. He suggests that "for most [Men at Work] fans, it will be the only disc they ever need."

== Track listing ==
All tracks are written by Colin Hay, except where noted.

No.	Title	Writer(s)	Album	Length
1.	"Who Can It Be Now?"		Business as Usual, 1981	3:19
2.	"Down Under"	Hay, Ron Strykert	Business as Usual	3:40
3.	"It's a Mistake"		Cargo, 1983	4:31
4.	"Hard Luck Story"		Two Hearts, 1985	3:41
5.	"Still Life"	Greg Ham	Two Hearts	3:49
6.	"Underground"		Business as Usual	3:02
7.	"Upstairs in My House"	Hay, Strykert	Cargo	4:00
8.	"I Like To" (live)	Strykert	"Dr. Heckyll & Mr. Jive" single, 1983	4:25
9.	"High Wire"		Cargo	3:00
10.	"Maria"		Two Hearts	4:34
11.	"Be Good Johnny"	Hay, Ham	Business as Usual	3:33
12.	"Dr. Heckyll & Mr. Jive"		Cargo	4:36
13.	"Overkill"		Cargo	3:43
14.	"Man with Two Hearts"		Two Hearts	3:55
15.	"Snakes and Ladders"	Ham	Two Hearts	3:16
16.	"Down by the Sea"	Hay, Ham, Strykert, Jerry Speiser	Business as Usual	6:48
Total length:				1:03:52

== Charts ==
Chart (1996)	Peak position
New Zealand Albums (RMNZ)	36

== Personnel ==
- Colin Hay – vocals, guitar
- Ron Strykert – guitar, vocals
- Jerry Speiser – drums, vocals
- Greg Ham – saxophone, keyboards, vocals, flute, harmonica
- John Rees – bass, vocals
