= '81–'85 =

- original cover art

Greatest hits album by Men at Work
- Released: November 1986
- Recorded: 1981–1985
- Genre: Pop rock
- Label: Columbia
- Producer: Peter McIan, Colin Hay, Greg Ham

Men at Work chronology
Two Hearts (1985)	'81–'85 (1986)	Contraband: The Best of Men at Work (1996)

'81–'85 is the first greatest hits album by Australian pop rock band Men at Work, released in November 1986. The album includes tracks from the band's three studio albums. The album reached number 42 on the Australian charts.

The album was re-released in 1992 as The Works and was certified platinum in Australia.

== Track listing ==
Side A
No.	Title	Writer(s)	Album	Length
1.	"Down Under"	Hay, Ron Strykert	Business as Usual (1981)	3:40
2.	"Be Good Johnny"	Hay, Greg Ham	Business as Usual	3:35
3.	"Hard Luck Story"	Hay	Two Hearts (1985)	3:41
4.	"It's a Mistake"	Hay	Cargo (1983)	4:31
5.	"Shintaro"	Strykert	non album track	2:52
6.	"Everything I Need"	Hay	Two Hearts	3:35

Side B
No.	Title	Writer(s)	Album	Length
1.	"Who Can It Be Now?"	Hay	Business as Usual	3:31
2.	""Dr. Heckyll & Mr. Jive""	Hay	Cargo	4:14
3.	"Still Life"	Ham	Two Hearts	3:51
4.	"Overkill"	Hay	Cargo	3:45
5.	"Underground"	Hay	Business as Usual	3:04
6.	"The Longest Night"	Ham	live; non album track	4:04

Side C
No.	Title	Writer(s)	Album	Length
1.	"Sail to You" (Extended Mix)	Hay, Ham, Strykert	Two Hearts	5:46

Side D
No.	Title	Writer(s)	Album	Length
1.	"Down Under" (Extended Mix)	Hay, Strykert	"Down Under" 12" single (1981)	5:23

== Charts ==
Chart (1986)	Peak position
Australia (Kent Music Report)	42

== Certifications ==
Region	Certification	Certified units/sales
Australia (ARIA)	Platinum	70,000^{^}
^{^} Shipments figures based on certification alone.
