= List of Men at Work band members =

List of members of the Australian rock band Men at Work

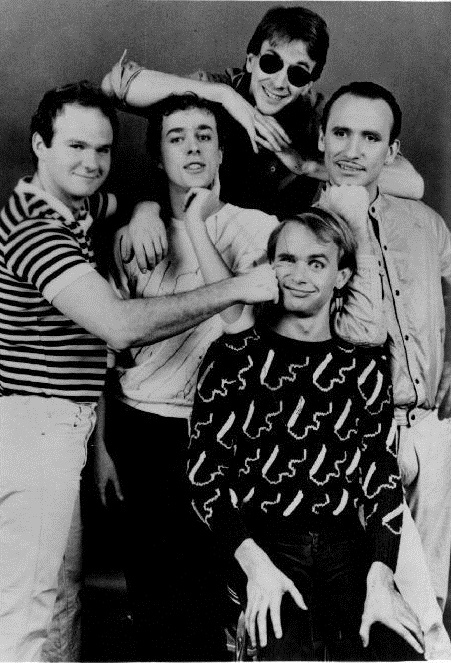
Men at Work in 1983

Men at Work is an Australian pop rock band founded in 1978 in St Kilda, Victoria. The group is best known for several Number 1 singles and studio albums released between 1981 and 1983. The following is a complete chronology of the band's member history. Although active to this day, frontman Colin Hay has been the only constant member throughout the decades.

== Members ==
=== Current ===
Image	Name	Years active	Instruments	Release contributions
	Colin Hay	1978–1986; 1996–2002; 2019–present (occasional performances from 2002–2012)	lead vocals; rhythm guitar; bass	all releases
	Jimmy Branly	2019–present	drums	none to date
	San Miguel Perez	2019–present	guitar; backing vocals	none to date
	Yosmel Montejo	2019–present	bass; backing vocals	none to date
	Cecilia Noël	2019–present	backing vocals	none to date
	Rachel Mazer	2025–present	saxophone; flute; keyboards; harmonica; backing vocals	none to date

=== Former ===
Image	Name	Years active	Instruments	Release contributions
	Ron Strykert	1978–1985	lead guitar; bass; vocals	all studio releases
	Jerry Speiser	1979–1984	drums; percussion; backing vocals	Business as Usual (1981); Cargo (1983)
	Greg Sneddon	1979	keyboards	none
	Greg Ham	1979–1985; 1996–2002 (occasional performances from 2002–2012; his death)	saxophone; keyboards; harmonica; flute; vocals; guitar	all releases from Business as Usual (1981) to Brazil (1998)
	John Rees	1980–1984	bass; backing vocals	Business as Usual (1981); Cargo (1983)
	Jeremy Alsop	1985–1986	bass; backing vocals	Two Hearts (1985)
	James Black	1985–1986	guitar; keyboards; backing vocals	Two Hearts (1985)
	Mark Kennedy	1985 (died 2026)	drums	Two Hearts (1985)
	Colin Bayley	1985–1986	guitar; backing vocals	none
	Chad Wackerman	1985–1986	drums; backing vocals	none
	Paul Williamson	1985–1986	saxophone; keyboards; backing vocals	none
	Simon Hosford	1996–1998; 1999–2001	guitar; backing vocals	Brazil (1998)
	Stephen Hadley	1996–1998; 2001	bass; backing vocals	Brazil (1998)
	John Watson	1996–1997	drums	Brazil (1998)
	Tony Floyd	1997–1998; 1999–2000	drums	Brazil (1998) (one track only)
	Rick Grossman	1998–1999	bass; backing vocals	none
	James Ryan	1998–1999	guitar; backing vocals	none
	Peter Maslen	1998–1999	drums	none
	Stuart Speed	1998–1999	bass; backing vocals	none
	Rodrigo Aravena	2000–2001	bass; backing vocals	none
	Heta Moses	2000–2001	drums	none
	Warren Trout	2001	drums	none
	Scheila Gonzalez	2019–2025	saxophone; flute; keyboards; backing vocals	none

== Line-ups ==
Period	Members	Studio releases
1978–1979	Colin Hay – vocals, guitar; Ron Strykert – guitar, vocals	none
1979	Colin Hay – vocals, guitar; Ron Strykert – bass, guitar, vocals; Jerry Speiser – drums, vocals; Greg Sneddon – keyboards	none
1979–1980 ("Men at Work" name adopted)	Colin Hay – vocals, guitar; Ron Strykert – bass, guitar, vocals; Jerry Speiser – drums, vocals; Greg Ham – saxophone, keyboards, vocals, flute, harmonica	none
1980–1984 (Classic lineup)	Colin Hay – vocals, guitar; Ron Strykert – guitar, vocals; Jerry Speiser – drums, vocals; Greg Ham – saxophone, keyboards, vocals, flute, harmonica; John Rees – bass, vocals	Business as Usual (1981); Cargo (1983)
1984–1985	Colin Hay –vocals, guitar; Ron Strykert – guitar, bass, vocals; Greg Ham – saxophone, keyboards, vocals, flute, harmonica	none
1985	Colin Hay – vocals, guitar; Greg Ham – saxophone, keyboards, vocals, flute, harmonica	none
1985	Colin Hay – vocals, guitar; Greg Ham – saxophone, keyboards, vocals, flute, harmonica; James Black – guitar, keyboards, vocals; Jeremy Alsop – bass, vocals; Mark Kennedy – drums	Two Hearts (1985)
1985	Colin Hay – vocals, guitar; Greg Ham – saxophone, keyboards, vocals, flute, harmonica; James Black – guitar, keyboards, vocals; Jeremy Alsop – bass, vocals; Colin Bayley – guitar, vocals; Chad Wackerman – drums	none
1985–1986	Colin Hay – vocals, guitar; James Black – guitar, keyboards, vocals; Jeremy Alsop – bass, vocals; Colin Bayley – guitar, vocals; Paul Williamson – saxophone, keyboards, vocals; Chad Wackerman – drums	none
1986–1996	Disbanded	
1996–1997	Colin Hay – vocals, guitar; Greg Ham – saxophone, keyboards, vocals, flute, harmonica; Simon Hosford – guitar, vocals; Stephen Hadley – bass, vocals; John Watson – drums	Brazil (2018)
1997–1998	Colin Hay – vocals, guitar; Greg Ham – saxophone, keyboards, vocals, flute, harmonica; Simon Hosford – guitar, vocals; Stephen Hadley – bass, vocals; Tony Floyd – drums	Brazil (2018) (one track only)
1998–1999	Colin Hay – vocals, guitar; Greg Ham – saxophone, keyboards, vocals, flute, harmonica; James Ryan – guitar, vocals; Rick Grossman – bass, vocals; Peter Maslen – drums	none
1999–2000	Colin Hay – vocals, guitar; Greg Ham – saxophone, keyboards, vocals, flute, harmonica; Simon Hosford – guitar, vocals; Stuart Speed – bass, vocals; Tony Floyd – drums	none
2000–2001	Colin Hay – vocals, guitar; Greg Ham – saxophone, keyboards, vocals, flute, harmonica; Simon Hosford – guitar, vocals; Rodrigo Aravena – bass, vocals; Heta Moses – drums	none
2001	Colin Hay – vocals, guitar; Greg Ham – saxophone, keyboards, vocals, flute, harmonica; Simon Hosford – guitar, vocals; Stephen Hadley – bass, vocals; Warren Trout – drums	none
2001–2002 (Occasional reunions until 2012)	Colin Hay – vocals, guitar; Greg Ham – saxophone, keyboards, vocals, flute, harmonica	none
2002–2019	Disbanded	
2019–2025	Colin Hay – vocals, guitar; Scheila Gonzalez – saxophone, keyboards, vocals, flute; San Miguel Perez – guitar, backing vocals; Yosmel Montejo – bass, backing vocals; Jimmy Branly – drums; Cecilia Noël – backing vocals	none
2025–present	Colin Hay – vocals, guitar; Rachel Mazer – saxophone, keyboards, vocals, flute; San Miguel Perez – guitar, backing vocals; Yosmel Montejo – bass, backing vocals; Jimmy Branly – drums; Cecilia Noël – backing vocals	none to date
