= Brazil (Men at Work album) =

Live album by Men at Work
- Released: 25 August 1998
- Recorded: May 1996 – March 1998
- Genre: Pop rock; new wave
- Length: 76:34
- Label: Ariola/BMG (Brazil); Columbia (International)
- Producer: Greg Ham, Colin Hay, "The Longest Night" produced by Greg Ham

Men at Work chronology
Contraband: The Best of Men at Work (1996)	Brazil (1998)	Simply The Best (1998)

Singles from Brazil
- 1. "The Longest Night" Released: 1998

Brazil is a live album by Australian band Men at Work, released in 1998. This album was recorded at a live show at Olympia music venue in Brazil, hence the title. It was first released there as Brazil '96, but for the international release, the year was removed and a new studio recording, "The Longest Night", was added. "The Longest Night" had long been part of the group's live set, being played in concert at least since 1983.

== Reception ==
Professional ratings
Review scores
Source	Rating
AllMusic	4.5/5 stars

In their retrospective review, AllMusic wrote that: "The new members sound almost identical to the originals, and with a stellar set list composed almost entirely of classic material, it's nearly impossible to hear the difference between the Men at Work lineups of 1996 and 1983."

== Track listing ==
No.	Title	Lyrics	Music	Length
1.	"Batucada"			0:23
2.	"Overkill"	Colin Hay	C. Hay	4:19
3.	"Touching the Untouchables"	C. Hay, Ron Strykert	R. Strykert	3:53
4.	"Catch a Star"	C. Hay	C. Hay	3:43
5.	"Into My Life"	C. Hay	C. Hay	5:29
6.	"No Sign of Yesterday"	C. Hay	C. Hay	7:09
7.	"Down Under"	C. Hay	C. Hay, Strykert	7:23
8.	"Underground"	C. Hay	C. Hay	3:50
9.	"Helpless Automaton"	Greg Ham	G. Ham	3:40
10.	"Who Can It Be Now?"	C. Hay	C. Hay	3:57
11.	"No Restrictions"	C. Hay	C. Hay	4:24
12.	"Everything I Need"	C. Hay	C. Hay	3:29
13.	"Dr. Heckyll & Mr. Jive"	C. Hay	C. Hay	4:16
14.	"Down by the Sea"	C. Hay	C. Hay, R. Strykert, G. Ham, Jerry Speiser	6:37
15.	"It's a Mistake"	C. Hay	C. Hay	5:22
16.	"Be Good Johnny"	C. Hay	C. Hay, G. Ham	4:33
17.	"The Longest Night"	G. Ham	G. Ham	4:07

Notes:

- All songs recorded live during Men at Work's tour of Brazil in May '96, except "The Longest Night" which was recorded in Secret Garden Studio (Melbourne) in March '98.

== Personnel ==
- Tony Floyd – drums on "The Longest Night"
- Stephen Hadley – bass, backing vocals
- Greg Ham – flute, guitar, harmonica, keyboards, soprano saxophone, tenor saxophone, vocoder, lead vocal on "Helpless Automaton", backing vocals
- Colin Hay – guitar, lead vocals (except on "Helpless Automaton")
- Simon Hosford – guitar, backing vocals
- John Watson – drums (except on "The Longest Night")

== Production ==
- Producers: Greg Ham, Colin Hay ("The Longest Night" produced by Greg Ham)
- Engineers: David Dale ("The Longest Night" engineered by Graeme Fraser and Greg Ham)
- Mixing: David Dale ("The Longest Night" mixed by Michael Letho)
- Editing: Joe Privitelli ("The Longest Night" edited by Greg Ham)
- Vocal Arranger on "The Longest Night": Toots Wostry
- Coordination: Greg Ham
- Photography: Greg Ham, Ana Hernandez, Isamu Sawa, Lupco Veljanovski
- Art direction: Steve Hunt
- Design: Steve Hunt
- Concept: Greg Ham
