= Ringo Starr & His All-Starr Band 30th Anniversary Tour =

2019 concert tour by Ringo Starr & His All-Starr Band

- Tour by Ringo Starr & His All-Starr Band
- Location: North America, Asia
- Start date: 21 March 2019
- End date: 1 September 2019
- No. of shows: 29

Ringo Starr & His All-Starr Band concert chronology
- Ringo Starr & His All-Starr Band Tour (2018); Ringo Starr & His All-Starr Band 30th Anniversary Tour (2019); Ringo Starr & His All-Starr Band Tour (2022)

The Ringo Starr & His All-Starr Band 30th Anniversary Tour was a concert tour by the rock supergroup Ringo Starr & His All-Starr Band that began on 21 March 2019 at Harrah's Resort Southern California in Valley Center, California, and concluded on 1 September 2019 at the Greek Theatre in Los Angeles, California. With concerts in the United States and Japan, as well as one show in Canada, the tour celebrated the anniversary of frontman Ringo Starr's first All-Starr Band tour in 1989.

The setlist for the tour included songs by Starr—both by his former band the Beatles and from his career as a solo artist—as well as songs by All-Starr band members and their associated bands, including Steve Lukather and Warren Ham of Toto, Gregg Rolie (formerly of Santana and Journey), Colin Hay of Men at Work, and Hamish Stuart (formerly of Average White Band). Drummer Gregg Bissonette also played on the tour.

== Reception ==
Matthew Leimkuehler of The Tennessean, reviewing the 7 August show at Nashville, Tennessee's Ryman Auditorium, characterized Starr's stage presence as modest yet playful, and commended the "jukebox format [that] keeps the 130-minute show moving quickly." He concluded that, "There's a carefree, no-nonsense quality to the show that's easy to embrace; it's plain-and-simple fun."

Dan DeLuca, in his review of 14 August show at Philadelphia, Pennsylvania's Metropolitan Opera House, called Hay "the standout vocalist of the show", but noted that, "By the third go-round of non-Starr tunes, the show started to drag and became something to endure more than enjoy, with the crowd impatiently calling for 'Ringo!' between songs." However, DeLuca concluded that "all was well once the Beatle came down off his drum throne and back into the spotlight [...] That Beatles magic was in the air, and everyone in the room was Ringo's friend."

== Setlist ==
This is the setlist that was performed at the 7 August show at Nashville's Ryman Auditorium, and may not represent the setlist of every show on the tour.

1. "Matchbox"
2. "It Don't Come Easy"
3. "What Goes On"
4. "Evil Ways" (with Gregg Rolie)
5. "Rosanna" (with Steve Lukather)
6. "Pick Up the Pieces" (with Hamish Stuart)
7. "Down Under" (with Colin Hay)
8. "Boys"
9. "Don't Pass Me By"
10. "Yellow Submarine"
11. "Cut the Cake" (with Hamish Stuart)
12. "Black Magic Woman" (with Gregg Rolie)
13. "You're Sixteen"
14. "Anthem"
15. "Overkill" (with Colin Hay)
16. "Africa" (with Steve Lukather)
17. "Work to Do" (with Hamish Stuart)
18. "Oye Como Va" (with Gregg Rolie)
19. "I Wanna Be Your Man"
20. "Who Can It Be Now?" (with Colin Hay)
21. "Hold the Line" (with Steve Lukather)
22. "Photograph"
23. "Act Naturally"
24. "With a Little Help from My Friends" / "Give Peace a Chance"

== Tour dates ==
Date	City	Country	Venue
North America
21 March 2019	Valley Center	United States	Harrah's Resort Southern California
Asia
27 March 2019	Fukuoka	Japan	Fukuoka Sunpalace Hall
29 March 2019	Hiroshima	Japan	Ueno Gakuen Hall
1 April 2019	Sendai	Japan	Tokyo Electron Hall Miyagi
2 April 2019	Kōriyama	Japan	Shimin Center
3 April 2019	Tokyo	Japan	Hitomi Kinen Kodo
5 April 2019	Tokyo	Japan	Tokyo Dome City Hall
9 April 2019	Nagoya	Japan	Zepp Nagoya
10 April 2019	Osaka	Japan	Archaic Hall
11 April 2019	Osaka	Japan	Orix Theater
North America
1 August 2019	Windsor	Canada	Caesars Windsor
3 August 2019	Highland Park	United States	Ravinia Festival
4 August 2019	Highland Park	United States	Ravinia Festival
6 August 2019	Durham	United States	Durham Performing Arts Center
7 August 2019	Nashville	United States	Ryman Auditorium
8 August 2019	Nashville	United States	Ryman Auditorium
10 August 2019	Vienna	United States	Wolf Trap National Park for the Performing Arts
11 August 2019	Vienna	United States	Wolf Trap National Park for the Performing Arts
13 August 2019	Roanoke	United States	Berglund Center Coliseum
14 August 2019	Philadelphia	United States	Metropolitan Opera House
20 August 2019	Champaign	United States	State Farm Center
22 August 2019	Prior Lake	United States	Mystic Lake Casino Hotel
23 August 2019	Council Bluffs	United States	Harrah's Council Bluffs
25 August 2019	Sante Fe	United States	Santa Fe Opera House
26 August 2019	Phoenix	United States	Celebrity Theatre
28 August 2019	Oakland	United States	Paramount Theatre
30 August 2019	Lincoln	United States	Thunder Valley Casino Resort
31 August 2019	Paso Robles	United States	Vina Robles Amphitheatre
1 September 2019	Los Angeles	United States	Greek Theatre
