= Ringo Starr & His All-Starr Band Tour (2022) =

Concert tour by Ringo Starr & His All-Starr Band

- Tour by Ringo Starr & His All-Starr Band
- Poster for the 30 May 2022 concert in Canandaigua, New York
- Location: North America
- Start date: 27 May 2022

Ringo Starr & His All-Starr Band concert chronology
- Ringo Starr & His All-Starr Band 30th Anniversary Tour (2019); Ringo Starr & His All-Starr Band Tour (2022)

The 2022 concert tour by the rock supergroup Ringo Starr & His All-Starr Band began on 27 May 2022 in Rama, Ontario, Canada. The tour was originally scheduled to begin in 2020, but was postponed to 2021 due to the COVID-19 pandemic. In 2021, the group's lead vocalist, Ringo Starr, stated that they would not be touring that year. After the tour eventually commenced in May 2022, it was brought to a halt the following month when All-Starr band members Edgar Winter and Steve Lukather tested positive for COVID-19; the remaining tour dates, originally scheduled for June and July 2022, were postponed to September and October, adding on to the planned autumn leg of the tour.

The tour ended prematurely when, on 13 October 2022, Starr cancelled all remaining dates when he tested positive for COVID-19.

The setlist for the tour included songs by Starr—both by his former band the Beatles and from his career as a solo artist—as well as songs by All-Starr band members and their associated bands, including Winter (formerly of the Edgar Winter Group), Lukather and Warren Ham (both members of Toto), Hamish Stuart (formerly of the Average White Band), and Colin Hay of Men at Work.

== Reception ==
Jane Stevenson of the Toronto Sun, reviewing the 27 May concert at Rama, Ontario, gave the show a rating of three out of four stars, commending Starr's performances of his Beatles-era and solo career songs, as well as Hay's vocals.

The Boston Globe's Mark Hirsh, in his review of the 2 June show at Boston, Massachusetts' Boch Center Wang Theatre, wrote that the lineup of the All-Starr Band "was a bit more seamless than past conglomerations", and that the concert itself is "designed to do little more than wrap the audience in amiably comforting familiarity for an hour and a half." Hirsh concluded that, "as mission statement 'With a Little Help from My Friends' closed out his show (with a 'Give Peace a Chance' chaser) for the umpteenth time, it was clear Starr knows he can't do it alone. It was equally clear he doesn't want to."

Scott Mervis of the Pittsburgh Post-Gazette wrote positively of the 10 September show at Pittsburgh, Pennsylvania's PPG Paints Arena, stating that "[Starr is] as youthful at 82 as anyone could be, and his skills as a brilliant drummer and modest singer are still intact." Mervis praised the performances of the songs on the setlist, writing that the performance of Toto's "Rosanna" "rocked about 10 times harder than the studio version," and noted that, "The crowd got a steady stream of hits but not much in the way of production. It was nothing but a cloth psychedelic backdrop with projections of stars on it. No video screens at all, which is not great for an arena show."

Also reviewing the 10 September concert, The Beaver County Times' Scott Tady praised the setlist, Hay's vocal range, Lukather's "searing guitar work", and Warren Ham's instrumental and vocal contributions. Tady added that "Starr sounded in vintage form singing the final three songs," and summarized the show as "No fancy lights, no nostalgic video projections, no elaborate stage design − just a Beatle and his truly All-Starr Band − playing the hits well, and with enthusiasm, as they brought joy to fans. [...] A Starr-y, Starry-y night to remember warmly."

== Setlist ==
Casino Rama
1. "Matchbox"
2. "It Don't Come Easy"
3. "What Goes On"
4. "Free Ride" (with Edgar Winter)
5. "Rosanna" (with Steve Lukather)
6. "Pick Up the Pieces" (with Hamish Stuart)
7. "Down Under" (with Colin Hay)
8. "Boys"
9. "I'm the Greatest"
10. "Yellow Submarine"
11. "Cut the Cake" (with Hamish Stuart)
12. "Overkill" (with Colin Hay)
13. "Africa" (with Steve Lukather)
14. "Work to Do" (with Hamish Stuart)
15. "I Wanna Be Your Man"
16. "Johnny B. Goode" (with Edgar Winter)
17. "Who Can It Be Now?" (with Colin Hay)
18. "Hold the Line" (with Steve Lukather)
19. "Photograph"
20. "Act Naturally"
21. "With a Little Help from My Friends" / "Give Peace a Chance"
PPG Paints Arena
1. "Matchbox"
2. "It Don't Come Easy"
3. "What Goes On"
4. "Free Ride" (with Edgar Winter)
5. "Rosanna" (with Steve Lukather)
6. "Pick Up the Pieces" (with Hamish Stuart)
7. "Down Under" (with Colin Hay)
8. "Boys"
9. "I'm the Greatest"
10. "Yellow Submarine"
11. "Cut the Cake" (with Hamish Stuart)
12. "Frankenstein" (with Edgar Winter)
13. "Octopus's Garden"
14. "Back Off Boogaloo"
15. "Overkill" (with Colin Hay)
16. "Africa" (with Steve Lukather)
17. "Work to Do" (with Hamish Stuart)
18. "I Wanna Be Your Man"
19. "Johnny B. Goode" (with Edgar Winter)
20. "Who Can It Be Now?" (with Colin Hay)
21. "Hold the Line" (with Steve Lukather)
22. "Photograph"
23. "Act Naturally"
24. "With a Little Help from My Friends" / "Give Peace a Chance"

== Tour dates ==
Date	City	Country	Venue
North America
27 May 2022	Rama	Canada	Casino Rama
28 May 2022	Rama	Canada	Casino Rama
30 May 2022	Canandaigua	United States	CMAC
31 May 2022	Asbury Park	United States	Paramount Theatre
2 June 2022	Boston	United States	Boch Center Wang Theatre
4 June 2022	Gilford	United States	Bank of New Hampshire Pavilion
6 June 2022	New York City	United States	Beacon Theatre
7 June 2022	New York City	United States	Beacon Theatre
8 June 2022	New York City	United States	Beacon Theatre
10 June 2022	Red Bank	United States	Count Basie Theater
5 September 2022 (Note: Originally scheduled to take place on 17 June 2022, before being postponed.)	Lenox	United States	Tanglewood Music Center
6 September 2022 (Note: Originally scheduled to take place on 14 June 2022, before being postponed.)	Baltimore	United States	The Modell Lyric
7 September 2022 (Note: Originally scheduled to take place on 15 June 2022, before being postponed.)	Baltimore	United States	The Modell Lyric
9 September 2022 (Note: Originally scheduled to take place on 11 June 2022, before being postponed.)	Easton	United States	State Theatre
10 September 2022 (Note: Originally scheduled to take place on 18 June 2022, before being postponed.)	Pittsburgh	United States	PPG Paints Arena
11 September 2022 (Note: Originally scheduled to take place on 19 June 2022, before being postponed.)	Philadelphia	United States	Metropolitan Opera House
15 September 2022 (Note: Originally scheduled to take place on 24 June 2022, before being postponed.)	St. Augustine	United States	St. Augustine Amphitheatre
16 September 2022 (Note: Originally scheduled to take place on 26 June 2022, before being postponed.)	Clearwater	United States	Ruth Eckerd Hall
17 September 2022 (Note: Originally scheduled to take place on 25 June 2022, before being postponed.)	Hollywood	United States	Seminole Hard Rock Hotel & Casino Hollywood
19 September 2022 (Note: Originally intended as two dates, scheduled to take place on 21 and 22 June 2022, before being postponed.)	Atlanta	United States	Cobb Energy Performing Arts Centre
20 September 2022	Richmond	United States	Virginia Credit Union Live!
22 September 2022 (Note: Originally scheduled to take place on 12 June 2022, before being postponed.)	Providence	United States	Providence Performing Arts Center
23 September 2022	Bridgeport	United States	Hartford HealthCare Amphitheater
24 September 2022	Atlantic City	United States	Hard Rock Live at Etess Arena
26 September 2022	Laval	Canada	Place Bell
27 September 2022	Kingston	Canada	Leon's Centre
28 September 2022	Toronto	Canada	Massey Hall
30 September 2022	Mount Pleasant	United States	Soaring Eagle Casino & Resort
1 October 2022 (canceled)	New Buffalo	United States	Silver Creek Event Center at Four Winds New Buffalo
2 October 2022 (canceled)	Prior Lake	United States	Mystic Lake Casino Hotel
4 October 2022 (canceled)	Winnipeg	Canada	Canada Life Centre
5 October 2022 (canceled)	Saskatoon	Canada	SaskTel Centre
6 October 2022 (canceled)	Lethbridge	Canada	ENMAX Centre
8 October 2022 (canceled)	Abbotsford	Canada	Abbotsford Centre
9 October 2022 (canceled)	Penticton	Canada	South Okanagan Events Centre
11 October 2022	Seattle	United States	Benaroya Hall – S. Mark Taper Foundation Auditorium
12 October 2022	Portland	United States	Arlene Schnitzer Concert Hall
14 October 2022 (canceled)	San Jose	United States	San Jose Civic
15 October 2022 (canceled)	Paso Robles	United States	Vina Robles Amphitheatre
16 October 2022 (canceled)	Los Angeles	United States	Greek Theatre
19 October 2022 (canceled)	Mexico City	Mexico	Auditorio Nacional
20 October 2022 (canceled)	Mexico City	Mexico	Auditorio Nacional
