= Frost (Australian band) =

- Origin: Melbourne, Victoria, Australia
- Genre: Pop rock
- Years active: 1997–2013
- Labels: Waterfront; Universal
- Past members: Lee Trevena; Tim Powne; Benny Bishop; Andrew McDougall; Jerry Speiser; Rohan Heddle; Rachel Parkinson (Exploding Daisies, Little Feet Music, Rachel Parkinson Band, Rachel Parkinson and The Something Somethings); Joe James

Frost was an Australian indie pop rock band, which formed in 1997 by Benny Bishop on keyboards, Lee "Lemon" Trevena on lead vocals and Tim "Porn" Powne on bass guitar. They have used several drummers including Jerry Speiser (ex-Men at Work) and Rohan Heddle (ex-Cordrazine) from 2002 to 2006.

== History ==
Lee Trevena and Joe James attended Croydon Community School between 1988 and 1993 in Melbourne, Australia. After leaving high school, they formed Frost, as an indie pop rock band in February 1997. The line-up included Lee "Lemon" Trevena on lead vocals and guitar, Tim "Porn" Powne on bass guitar and backing vocals, and Benny Bishop on keyboards (ex-ABBAration). Early on they recorded demos with Peter Reggie Bowman (Southern Sons), one of which contained an early version of the song “Here I Go”, which was later recorded by “Brill” (Brian Canham of Pseudo Echo). The band used several drummers since their inception. In 2002 Jerry Speiser (ex-Men at Work, Ross Hannaford's One World) joined on drums.

The band received high rotation on MTV (Australia) with their song "Candyman" in 2000 and on Nova 100 and SBS Television in 2003 for their single "You and Me", which was featured on the SBS and Universal Records CD, The SBS Whatever Sessions and was released on their four-track extended play The Usual Suspects (September 2004). In 2005 they released their debut self-titled album Frost, which was manufactured and distributed by Shock Records. The single from this album, “Do It In Style”, was produced by Cameron McKenzie (Horsehead/Mark Seymour). Their next EP, 10:06, was released in September 2006.

Speiser was replaced by Rohan Heddle (Cordrazine) on drums, until 2008. Frost appeared on the Sound of Melbourne Records release in 2011.

== Personnel ==
- Benny Bishop – keyboards
- Tim "Porn" Powne – bass guitar, backing vocals
- Lee "Lemon" Trevena – lead vocals, piano, guitar
- Jerry Speiser – drums
- Rohan Heddle – drums
- Rachel Parkinson – drums
- Joe James

== Discography ==
=== Albums ===
- Frost (2005) – Shock Records (LEMR002)

=== Extended plays ===
- The Usual Suspects (12 September 2004) – Lemon Records / MGM Distribution (LEMR001)
- 10:06 (16 September 2006) – Lemon Records / Green Records / Waterfront Records (LEMR003)

=== Other appearances ===
- Cheap 'N' Easy - Unleashed (2002) by US company Gold Record Music
- Independence - Volume One (2003) by Aus company By Design Records & MGM
- The SBS Whatever Sessions (2003) by Aus company Special broadcasting Service and Universal Music Aus
- Sound of Melbourne (2011) by Aus Sound of Melbourne Records

== Member histories ==
- Lee Trevena: In 1997, had his song "Here I Go" recorded on the Brian Canham (Pseudo Echo) self-titled debut album Brill. He performed as one half of the acoustic duo Top Deck with Ando McDougell (Dreadnaught), in which they had a residency at the Parkview Hotel in Fitzroy in 2000. In 2006 he wrote the main theme song for a short film titled Passing the Baton, produced by Department for Victorian Communities / Mushroom Marketing. He also worked with Jess McAvoy on her The Women album, released in 2014, and McDermott & North with their 'The Lemon Tape - Vol 1' debut 2018 release. Trevena has collaborated with various Australian artists. He is currently a Melbourne researcher at the Centre for Design Innovation at Swinburne University.
- Joe James: since leaving Frost has played in numerous cover bands
- Tim 'Porne' Powne: unknown
- Rohan Heddle: was a founding member of Cordrazine. He has played in various jazz groups, one of which was the Mondlarks, which recorded songs at Lemon's home studio in 2013.
- Jerry Speiser: was a founding member of the ARIA Hall of Fame band Men at Work, who won a US Grammy Award in the early 1980s. He continues to play in bands.
- Rachel Parkinson: was a drummer in the band The Mabels, played drums in the all-female band Exploding Daisies in Sydney, and was co-hosting The Comic Box on Channel 31 in Melbourne on Friday nights. Rachel is a children’s entertainer and music educator and founded Little Feet Music in 2005. Rachel has written hundreds of songs, seven of which have been in the semi-finals of the International Songwriting Competition.
- Benny Bishop: worked at Yamaha Music, has worked in music theatre and was in an ABBA cover band. Currently he is the music director at Camberwell Grammar.
