= High Wire (song) =

Single by Men at Work

from the album Cargo
- B-side: "I Like To (Live)"
- Released: November 1983
- Recorded: 1982
- Genre: Pop
- Length: 3:02
- Label: Columbia
- Songwriter: Colin Hay
- Producer: Peter McLan

Men at Work singles chronology
"It's a Mistake" (1983)	"High Wire" (1983)	"Everything I Need" (1985)

"High Wire" is a song by the Australian group Men at Work. The song was written by Men at Work singer/guitarist Colin Hay and the recording was produced by Peter McIan. It was released in November 1983 as the fourth and final single from their album Cargo.

The song reached No. 89 on the Australian Kent Music Report Singles Chart and No. 23 on the US Rock Tracks chart. AllMusic's Stephen Erlewine described it as a tight pop song.

== Track listing ==
=== 7-inch International version ===
1. "High Wire" (Colin Hay) – 3:02
2. "I'd Like To" (Live) (Ron Strykert)

=== 12-inch Australian version ===
1. "High Wire" (Colin Hay) – 3:02
2. "Fallin' Down" (Live) (Jerry Speiser, Johnathan Rees)
3. "I'd Like To" (Live) (Ron Strykert)

== Chart positions ==
Chart (1983)	Peak position
Australia (Kent Music Report)	89
U.S. Top Rock Tracks (Billboard)	23
