= Olympia (São Paulo) =

Olympia was a 5,000-capacity music venue located in the São Paulo, Brazil. It was open from 1988 until 2006. A few of the notable artists that performed at Olympia include The Ramones, David Bowie, Cyndi Lauper, Uriah Heep, Eric Clapton, Deep Purple, Depeche Mode, Jethro Tull, Black Sabbath, Shakira, Pantera, Christina Aguilera, Sting and Men at Work.
