= Kookaburra (song) =

1932 children's song by Marion Sinclair

Song
- Language: English
- Written: 1932
- Songwriter: Marion Sinclair

"Kookaburra" (also known by its first line: "Kookaburra sits in the old gum tree") is an Australian nursery rhyme and round about the laughing kookaburra. It was written by Marion Sinclair (9 October 1896 – 15 February 1988) in 1932.

== Composition ==
Marion Sinclair was a music teacher at Toorak College, a girls' school in Melbourne she had attended as a boarder. In 1920, she began working with the school's Girl Guides company.

One Sunday morning in 1932, Sinclair had an inspiration in church and dashed home to write down the words to "Kookaburra". In 1934, she entered the song into a competition run by the Girl Guides Association of Victoria, with the rights of the winning song to be sold to raise money for the purchase of a camping ground, eventually chosen as Britannia Park. The song was performed for the first time in 1934 at the annual Jamboree in Frankston, Victoria, at which the Baden-Powells, founders of the Scouting and Guiding movements, were present.

The song is performed around the world, particularly in the United States, Canada, New Zealand and the United Kingdom, where the Girl Guide movement has adopted it as a traditional song.

== Copyright status ==
Marion Sinclair died in 1988, so the song is under copyright until 2038, according to copyright law of Australia. The publishing rights are held by Larrikin Music. In the United States, the rights are administered by Music Sales Corporation in New York City.

In June 2009, Larrikin Music sued the band Men at Work for copyright infringement, alleging that part of the flute riff of the band's 1981 single "Down Under" was copied from "Kookaburra". This action followed an episode of Spicks and Specks where this usage was the basis of a panel question. The counsel for the band's record label and publishing company (Sony BMG Music Entertainment and EMI Songs Australia) claimed that, based on the agreement under which the song was written, the copyright was actually held by the Girl Guides Association. On 30 July 2009, Justice Peter Jacobson of the Federal Court of Australia made a preliminary ruling that Larrikin did own copyright on the song, but the issue of whether or not songwriters Colin Hay and Ron Strykert had plagiarised the riff would be determined at a later date. On 4 February 2010, Justice Jacobson delivered his judgment that Men at Work had infringed Larrikin's copyright, and that both recordings submitted to the court "...reproduce a substantial part of Kookaburra". Larrikin subsequently petitioned the court to receive between 40 and 60 percent of the song's royalties backdated to 1981, but on 6 July 2010 Justice Jacobson awarded the company five percent of royalties backdated to 2002—believed to be a six-figure sum.

On 31 March 2011, an appeal by record company EMI was dismissed by Justices Arthur Emmett, Jayne Jagot and John Nicholas, who concluded there had been an infringement of copyright of the tune "Kookaburra Sits in the Old Gum Tree". One of the band's songwriters, Colin Hay, said afterwards the result was disappointing and they would consider their position after reviewing the judgment more closely. In October 2011, the band lost its final court bid when the High Court of Australia refused to hear an appeal.

== Controversy ==
In 2010, Australian primary school principal Gary Martin replaced the lyric "gay your life must be" with "fun your life must be". There was an outcry that he was banning the word "gay". Martin clarified his position. "All I was doing," he stated, "was substituting one word because I knew if we sing 'Gay your life must be' the kids will roll around the floor in fits of laughter."
