= Larrikin Records =

Australian record company

Larrikin Records is a record company founded in 1974 by Warren Fahey. Larrikin started as an independent label and was sold in 1995 to Festival Records.

Artists who have released albums on Larrikin include Eric Bogle, Sirocco, Mike and Michelle Jackson, Bobby McLeod, Kev Carmody, Flying Emus, Robyn Archer, Redgum, Margret RoadKnight, Jeannie Lewis, Mark Atkins, Renée Geyer, Rank Strangers, The Sweets of Sin, Richard Frankland and Currency from Canberra.

In 1990 Larrikin bought the copyright to "Kookaburra", which had been written in 1932, for $6,100. In 2009 they sued Men at Work for including two bars of Kookaburra at the beginning of their song "Down Under", attempting to claim 60% of the profits made by the song. They were awarded 5% of the profits, which was changed to $100,000.

== See also ==
- List of record labels
