= Cargo (album) =

1983 album by Men at Work

Studio album by Men at Work
- Released: 29 April 1983
- Recorded: 1982
- Studios: AAV Studios (Melbourne, Australia); Paradise Studios (Sydney, Australia); Westlake Audio (Los Angeles, California, USA)
- Genres: Pop rock; new wave
- Length: 42:21
- Label: Columbia
- Producer: Peter McIan

Men at Work chronology
Business as Usual (1981)	Cargo (1983)	Two Hearts (1985)

Singles from Cargo
- 1. "Dr. Heckyll & Mr. Jive" Released: October 1982; 2. "Overkill" Released: March 1983; 3. "It's a Mistake" Released: June 1983; 4. "High Wire" Released: November 1983

Cargo is the second album by the Australian pop rock band Men at Work. It was released on 29 April 1983 by CBS Records in Australia and by Columbia Records in the United States and Canada. It peaked at No. 1 on the Australian Kent Music Report Albums Chart, No. 2 in New Zealand, No. 3 on the United States Billboard 200, and No. 8 on the United Kingdom Albums Chart.

Four singles were released from the album, with "Overkill" being an international top 10 hit in Canada, Ireland, Norway, and US Billboard Hot 100.

This was the last Men at Work album to feature the original line-up.

== Background ==
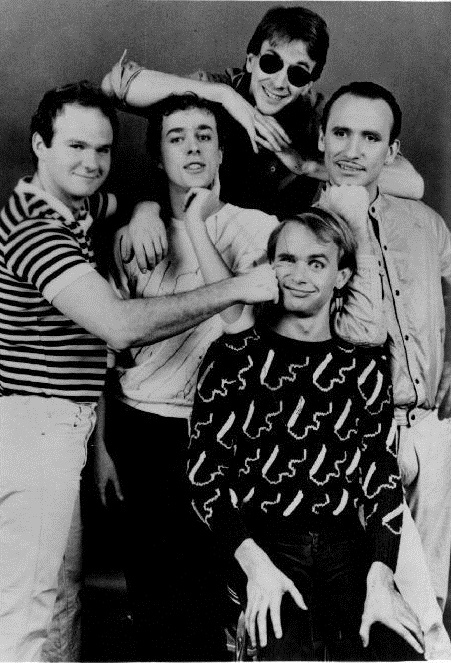
Men at Work in 1983

The Australian pop rock group Men at Work released their second album, Cargo, in April 1983, which peaked at No. 1 – for two weeks – on the Australian Kent Music Report Albums Chart. In New Zealand it reached No. 2. The album was recorded and finished by mid-1982 with Peter McIan producing again, but its release was pushed back due to the continued success of their debut album, Business as Usual. On the international market, where Business as Usual was still riding high, Cargo appeared at No. 3 on the Billboard 200, and No. 8 in the UK. The lead single, "Dr. Heckyll & Mr. Jive", was issued in Australia, ahead of the album, in October 1982; it reached No. 6 there in late 1982 and peaked at No. 28 in the US the following year. The second single "Overkill" was released in March 1983 and made it to No. 5 in Australia, and No. 3 in the US. A third single "It's a Mistake" followed in June and only reached No. 34 in Australia, but peaked at No. 6 in the US. The much less successful fourth and final single "High Wire" was released in late 1983 and only reached No. 89 in Australia, but reached No. 23 on the US Hot Mainstream Rock Tracks. The band toured the world extensively in 1983.

== Reception ==
Professional ratings
Review scores
Source	Rating
AllMusic	4.5/5 stars
Christgau's Record Guide	B
Rolling Stone	4/5 stars
Smash Hits	8/10

In Smash Hits, Fred Dellar praised Cargo as "an immaculately constructed album of outback pop for in-front people". Rolling Stone's Christopher Connelly wrote that Cargo "may lack a track with the body-slamming intensity of 'Who Can It Be Now?' and 'Down Under', but song for song, it is a stronger overall effort than Business as Usual". He chiefly praised the album's dark, paranoid lyrics. John Mendelssohn of Record also felt that none of the tracks measured up to Men at Work's early hits, but went further, saying the album in its entirety is inoffensive but forgettable, with "Upstairs in My House" being the only highlight. He found the band's instrumental solos particularly dull, and assessed that Men at Work's one asset is that "Colin Hay may be the most effortlessly soulful pop singer since Sting".

In a retrospective review, AllMusic's Stephen Thomas Erlewine praised "Overkill" and "It's a Mistake" as "demonstrating more depth than anything on the debut". However, he asserted that the album parallels their debut in that it focuses on two strong singles while it is "weighed down by filler".

== Track listing ==
All tracks are written by Colin Hay except as noted.

Side one
No.	Title	Lyrics	Music	Length
1.	"Dr. Heckyll & Mr. Jive"			4:38
2.	"Overkill"			3:47
3.	"Settle Down My Boy" (extended to 4:10 on the 2003 remaster)	Ron Strykert	Strykert	3:31
4.	"Upstairs in My House"	Hay, Strykert	Strykert	4:03
5.	"No Sign of Yesterday" (extended to 6:34 on the 2003 remaster)			6:15

Side two
No.	Title	Lyrics	Music	Length
6.	"It's a Mistake" (extended to 4:47 on the 2003 remaster)			4:34
7.	"High Wire"			3:02
8.	"Blue for You"			3:55
9.	"I Like To"	Strykert	Strykert	4:03
10.	"No Restrictions"			4:31

2003 remaster bonus tracks
No.	Title	Writer(s)	Length
11.	"Shintaro" (B-side from "It's a Mistake" single)	Strykert	2:52
12.	"'Till the Money Runs Out" (B-side from "Overkill" single)	Hay, Strykert, Greg Ham, Jerry Speiser, John Rees	3:06
13.	"Upstairs in My House" (live; B-side from "Dr. Heckyl & Mr. Jive" 12" (listed as "Upstairs at My House" on the 2003 remaster)	Hay, Strykert	3:13
14.	"Fallin' Down" (live; B-side from "High Wire" Australian single)		7:55
15.	"The Longest Night" (live) (previously unreleased)	Ham	4:04

The live tracks on the 2003 remastered edition are from a concert recorded 28 July 1983 at Merriweather Post Pavilion, Columbia, Maryland (tracks 13 and 14) and from a 1983 concert in Berkeley, California (track 15).

== Personnel ==
Men at Work

- Colin Hay – vocals, guitars
- Greg Ham – keyboards, flute, saxophone, vocals
- Ron Strykert – guitars, vocals
- John Rees – bass, vocals
- Jerry Speiser – drums, vocals

Production

- Peter McIan – producer, engineer
- Paul Ray – additional engineer
- Scott Heming – assistant engineer
- Chip Orlando – assistant engineer
- David Price – assistant engineer
- Greg Noakes – inner sleeve photography
- Ron Strykert – cover artwork
- Russell Deppeler – management
- Nathan D. Brenner – international consultant

== Charts ==
=== Weekly charts ===
Chart (1983–84)	Peak position
Australian Albums (Kent Music Report)	1
Canadian Albums (RPM)	3
Dutch Albums (Album Top 100)	11
German Albums (Offizielle Top 100)	7
Italian Albums (FIMI)	11
New Zealand Albums (RMNZ)	2
Norwegian Albums (VG-lista)	4
Swedish Albums (Sverigetopplistan)	8
UK Albums (Official Charts)	8
US Billboard 200	3

=== Year-end charts ===
Chart (1983)	Position
Canada Top Albums/CDs (RPM)	12
Dutch Albums (Album Top 100)	46
German Albums (Offizielle Top 100)	16
New Zealand Albums (RMNZ)	15
US Billboard 200	39

== Certifications ==
Region	Certification	Certified units/sales
Australia (ARIA)	Platinum	50,000^{^}
Canada (Music Canada)	3× Platinum	300,000^{^}
Japan	—	300,000
New Zealand (RMNZ)	Platinum	15,000^{^}
United Kingdom (BPI)	Gold	100,000^{^}
United States (RIAA)	3× Platinum	3,000,000^{^}
Summaries
Worldwide	—	5,000,000
^{^} Shipments figures based on certification alone.
