= Everything I Need =

Single by Men at Work

from the album Two Hearts
- B-side: "Sail to You"
- Released: May 1985
- Length: 3:35
- Label: Columbia
- Songwriter: Colin Hay

Men at Work singles chronology
"High Wire" (1983)	"Everything I Need" (1985)	"Maria" (1985)

"Everything I Need" is a song by the Australia band Men at Work. The song was written by Men at Work singer/guitarist Colin Hay and the recording was produced by Hay with keyboardist Greg Ham. It was released in May 1985 as the lead single from their album Two Hearts.

The tune is a mid-tempo pop/rock song, and is marked by a loud, thwacking drum rhythm and a prominent slide guitar solo.

"Everything I Need" peaked at #47 on the Billboard Hot 100 and #37 on the Australian chart. It was the last Men at Work single to make the charts.

== Reception ==
Cash Box magazine said "Australia's first big American breaker has fallen from the public eye due to a lack of recent product, but this latest single from the band's upcoming LP recaptures the quirky melodic charm that made the band such a multi-format winner the first time around."

== Track listing ==
=== 7": Epic / A 6276 - UK ===
1. "Everything I Need" (Single version) – 3:35
2. "Sail to You" – 3:25

=== 12": Epic / TA 6276 - UK ===
1. "Everything I Need" (Extended version) – 4:35
2. "Sail to You" – 3:25

=== 12": Columbia / 44 05216 - U.S. ===
1. "Everything I Need" (Extended Version) – 4:35
2. "Everything I Need" (Single Version) – 3:35

== Personnel ==
=== Men at Work ===
- Colin Hay - guitars, drum programming, lead vocals, backing vocals, drums
- Greg Ham - keyboards, saxophone, backing vocals

=== Session musicians ===
- Phil Colson - slide guitar
- Paul Gadsby - bass guitar

== Charts ==
Chart (1985)	Peak position
Australia (Kent Music Report)	37
US Billboard Hot 100	47
US Mainstream Rock (Billboard)	28
