= Overkill (Men at Work song) =

1983 single by Men At Work

Single by Men at Work

from the album Cargo
- B-side: "Till the Money Runs Out"
- Released: March 1983
- Recorded: 1982
- Studio: AAV (Melbourne, Australia); Paradise (Sydney, Australia); Westlake Audio (Los Angeles)
- Length: 3:44
- Label: Columbia
- Songwriter: Colin Hay
- Producer: Peter McIan

Men at Work singles chronology
"Dr. Heckyll & Mr. Jive" (1982)	"Overkill" (1983)	"It's a Mistake" (1983)

Music video
- "Overkill" on YouTube

"Overkill" is a song by the Australian rock band Men at Work. It was released in March 1983 as the second Australian and first American single from their second album Cargo. Written by lead singer Colin Hay, the song reached No. 3 on the US Billboard Hot 100 chart, No. 5 on the Australian Kent Music Report singles chart, and the top 10 in Canada, Ireland, and Norway.

== Background ==
"Overkill" was written by Men at Work frontman Colin Hay, who described the song as being about "stepping into the unknown." He elaborated:

"I was in St. Kilda and I felt that my time there was coming to a close and that I was going to probably leave there quite soon. Just about to leave somewhere, knowing that you're about to step into something that's like leaving your comfort zone, you know? Because you spend a lot of years trying to get something – for example, fame or recognition – or getting to a certain point, and then when you actually achieve it, there's always a certain amount of fear that comes with that. Not necessarily fear, but a sense of loss of control. Because all of a sudden, you're not in control of a situation anymore. There are other people involved so it's much, much less controllable."

Hay said that the song reflected his fear that he might be consumed by success, especially with regard to his tendency toward addiction and how he must avoid the pitfalls of fame. Hay was proud of the song after composing it; he recalled, "That was the first song that I wrote where I thought that maybe I could actually make a living as a songwriter, perhaps. I thought that was a good song that I'd written, one that will stand the test of time. I felt at the time it had something to it. I was very happy with that song."

Men at Work's second studio album, Cargo, was released in Australia in April 1983, reaching No. 1 on the Kent Music Report albums chart. The album's lead single, "Dr. Heckyll & Mr. Jive", was issued in Australia ahead of the album in October 1982 and reached No. 6 on the Kent Music Report singles chart. Despite recording having been completed in mid-1982, Cargo's release was held back due to the continuing international commercial success of the band's 1981 debut album, Business as Usual.

== Release and reception ==
Preceding the album, "Overkill" was released in March 1983 and debuted on the US Billboard Hot 100 chart at No. 28 on 9 April. It peaked at No. 3 in early June. In Canada, the song was ranked No. 55 on the 1983 year-end chart and was certified gold by Music Canada. The band toured the world extensively in 1983 to promote the album and related singles. Critically, Cash Box praised the "supple sax line."

== Music video ==
The video was mostly shot in the Melbourne suburb of St Kilda and featured landmarks such as the Esplanade Hotel and the St Kilda Pier.

== Track listing ==
1. "Overkill" (Colin Hay) – 3:44
2. "Till the Money Runs Out" (Colin Hay, Ron Strykert, Greg Ham, John Rees, Jerry Speiser) – 3:05

== Charts ==
=== Weekly charts ===
Chart (1983)	Peak position
Australia (Kent Music Report)	5
Belgium (Ultratop 50 Flanders)	26
Canada Top Singles (RPM)	6
Ireland (IRMA)	9
Italy (Musica e dischi)	12
Netherlands (Dutch Top 40)	16
Netherlands (Single Top 100)	15
New Zealand (Recorded Music NZ)	24
Norway (VG-lista)	5
South Africa (Springbok Radio)	20
UK Singles (Official Charts)	21
US Billboard Hot 100	3
US Adult Contemporary (Billboard)	6
US Mainstream Rock Airplay (Billboard)	3
West Germany (GfK)	30

=== Year end charts ===
Chart (1983)	Rank
Australia (Kent Music Report)	81
Canada Top Singles (RPM)	55
US Billboard Hot 100	54

== Certifications ==
Region	Certification	Certified units/sales
Canada (Music Canada)	Gold	50,000^{^}
^{^} Shipments figures based on certification alone.

== Lazlo Bane version ==
"Overkill"

Single by Lazlo Bane

from the album 11 Transistor
- Released: 1997
- Genre: Alternative rock
- Length: 4:13
- Label: Almo Sounds, BANG!
- Songwriter: Colin Hay
- Producer: Chad Fischer

Lazlo Bane singles chronology
"Buttercup" (1996)	"Overkill" (1997)	"Like a Flower" (2023)

Music video
- "Overkill" on YouTube

American alternative rock band Lazlo Bane covered the song and released it in 1996 as a B-side of their debut single "Buttercup", through Fish of Death Records.

After the group signed with Almo Sounds, the song was re-released as a promo single and included on the EP Short Style, and it was later released on the band's debut album 11 Transistor, which came out in January 1997. As a commercial single "Overkill" was released in some territories in 1997 and 1998.

The song was recorded with the participation of Colin Hay, who plays guitar on the track and sings the last verse alone, and the last chorus with Chad Fischer.

=== Music video ===
Lazlo Bane's music video, directed by Mark Miremont and also featuring Hay, was released 28 May 1997 and eventually entered MTV2's Top 10 of the 1997.

The video shows Lazlo Bane playing the song in a large hall of a hotel during the night which disturbs other residents who are portrayed by the members of the band. Colin Hay acts as the front desk clerk. During the first half of the song Hay receives several angry calls about the noise but does nothing about it. During the guitar solo the hotel starts to shake, finally forcing Hay to enter the hall where the band is playing, but only to sing the rest of the song together with the band.

=== Track listings ===
1997 CD (Festival Records D1648)

1. "Overkill" (Colin Hay) – 4:14
2. "Flea Market Girl" (Chad Fischer, Kevin Hunter) – 3:56
3. "Buttercup" (Fischer, Lyle Workman) – 3:44
4. "Mean Mr. Mustard" (John Lennon, Paul McCartney) – 2:24

1998 CD (BANG! 20545)

1. "Overkill" (Colin Hay) – 4:14
2. "Novakane" (Chad Fischer) – 2:37
3. "Prada Wallet" (Fischer / Josh Clayton-Felt / Kevin Hunter) – 1:11

== Other versions ==
- In 2003, Colin Hay's Man @ Work album consisted of re-recordings of songs from the Men at Work catalog as well as his solo career. The album featured an acoustic version of "Overkill". An edited version of that track was previously released in September 2002 on Music from Scrubs, the first NBC series Scrubs soundtrack album. Hay also appeared in the series itself, performing an acoustic version of the song in the first episode of season 2, "My Overkill".
- The American rock band Dashboard Confessional covered the tune in 2007 for a compilation album titled The Wire Tapes, Vol. 1.
- In January 2016, Hay performed "Overkill" on The Tonight Show Starring Jimmy Fallon, backed by Fallon's house band the Roots.
- In late 2016, the Canadian choir directors Choir! Choir! Choir! arranged the song for impromptu choir, performing it with Hay on guitar and lead vocals in Brooklyn, joined by hundreds of singing fans. The video amassed more than three million views.
- Hay has recorded many acoustic versions of the song with guitar accompaniment, for instance in June 2019 for Telefunken's Live from the Lab series, in January 2020 for The A.V. Club's "Undercover" series, and in July 2022 for SiriusXM.
