= Business as Usual (Men at Work album) =

- Original Australian cover artwork. Some international versions feature the same artwork tinted yellow.

Studio album by Men at Work
- Released: 9 November 1981
- Recorded: March–September 1981
- Studios: Richmond Recorders (Melbourne, Australia)
- Genres: New wave; reggae rock; pop rock
- Length: 38:00
- Label: Columbia
- Producer: Peter McIan

Men at Work chronology
| Business as Usual (1981) | Cargo (1983) |

Singles from Business as Usual
- 1. "Who Can It Be Now?" Released: June 1981; 2. "Down Under" Released: 2 November 1981; 3. "Be Good Johnny" Released: April 1982

Business as Usual is the debut studio album by the Australian new wave band Men at Work. It was released on 9 November 1981 in Australia by CBS Records, and in April 1982 in the United States and Canada by Columbia Records. It spent nine weeks at the top of the Australian Kent Music Report Albums Chart from December 1981 through to March 1982.

Business as Usual was one of the most successful albums internationally by an Australian group. It spent an unprecedented 15 weeks at No. 1 on the US Billboard 200 from late 1982 to early 1983; and five weeks at No. 1 in the United Kingdom Albums Chart in early 1983. Business as Usual was also one of the highest selling Australian albums in the early 1980s, with 6 million copies shipped in the US.

In October 2010, Business as Usual was listed in the book 100 Best Australian Albums.

The Australian version had a black and white cover design. Some overseas releases had a similar design, but in a black and yellow colour scheme.

== Background ==
By early 1981, Australian new wave group Men at Work consisted of Greg Ham on flute, saxophone, keyboards and vocals; Colin Hay on vocals and guitar; John Rees on bass guitar; Jerry Speiser on drums and backing vocals; and Ron Strykert on lead guitar and vocals. Hay was the group's main songwriter both on his own, with Strykert, or with other bandmates. The group signed with the Australian branch of Columbia Records, which issued their second single, "Who Can It Be Now?", in June that year. As record producer they used United States-born Peter McIan (Franne Golde, Serious Young Insects). The track was one written by Hay alone, and, in August, it peaked at No. 2 on the Australian Kent Music Report Singles Chart.

The group had already returned to the studio to continue working with McIan, who produced their debut album, Business as Usual, which included the earlier single. The second single from the album, "Down Under", was released in November and was a reworked version of the B-side to their debut single, "Keypunch Operator", from the previous year. "Down Under" was co-written by Hay and Strykert, and became the group's first number-one hit in December – which stayed at the top for six weeks. The album was released on 9 November 1981, it entered the top 50 on the Australian Kent Music Report Albums Chart in December peaking at No. 1 for nine weeks and appearing in the top 50 for 118 weeks.

The non-album B-side, the jam-oriented instrumental "Anyone for Tennis", was omitted from the 2003 remaster of Business as Usual (which contained both the other non-album B-sides from this era). It appears only on the B-side to "Who Can it Be Now?".

In February 2010, a Federal Court judge in Sydney found that the flute riff from "Down Under" had been plagiarised from the Australian song "Kookaburra Sits in the Old Gum Tree", written in 1932 by Marion Sinclair. The Federal Court determined that the copyright was still current (Sinclair died in 1988) and had been assigned to Larrikin Music. The judge found that "a substantial amount of the original song" had been reproduced in "Down Under". Larrikin Music had suggested 60% of the royalties would be appropriate compensation, but the court decreed they shall receive only 5%, and only on mechanical rights for the song since 2002, and on future profits.

== Reception ==
Professional ratings
Review scores
| Source | Rating |
|---|---|
| AllMusic | 4.5/5 stars |
| Christgau's Record Guide | B+ |
| Rolling Stone | 4/5 stars |

Australian musicologist Ian McFarlane described Business as Usual: "Aside from the strength of the music, part of the [its] appeal was its economy. The production sound was low-key, but clean and uncluttered. Indeed, the songs stood by themselves with little embellishment save for a bright, melodic, singalong quality". Gerry Raffaele for The Canberra Times felt "[it] generally stays at a high level, tight and jerky, although I still favour the tracks which have appeared as singles ... There is a delicacy about this music – and that is not a thing you can say about too many rock groups".

== Accolades ==
=== Countdown Music and Video Awards ===
| Year | Nominee / work | Award | Result |
|---|---|---|---|
| 1981 | Business as Usual | Best Debut Album | Won |
| 1981 | "Who Can It Be Now?" | Best Debut Single | Won |
| 1981 | Men at Work | Best New Talent | Won |
| 1982 | Men at Work | Most Outstanding Achievement | Won |

=== Grammy Awards ===
| Year | Nominee / work | Award | Result |
|---|---|---|---|
| 1983 | Men at Work (performer) | Best New Artist | Won |

=== Brit Awards ===
| Year | Nominee / work | Award | Result |
|---|---|---|---|
| 1984 | Men at Work (performer) | Best International Artist | Nominated |

== Track listing ==
Business as Usual – Standard edition – Side one
| No. | Title | Writer(s) | Length |
|---|---|---|---|
| 1. | "Who Can It Be Now?" | Colin Hay | 3:21 |
| 2. | "I Can See It in Your Eyes" | Hay | 3:29 |
| 3. | "Down Under" | Hay, Ron Strykert | 3:42 |
| 4. | "Underground" | Hay | 3:03 |
| 5. | "Helpless Automaton" | Greg Ham | 3:21 |

Business as Usual – Standard edition – Side two
| No. | Title | Writer(s) | Length |
|---|---|---|---|
| 6. | "People Just Love to Play with Words" | Strykert | 3:29 |
| 7. | "Be Good Johnny" | Hay, Ham | 3:35 |
| 8. | "Touching the Untouchables" | Hay, Strykert | 3:39 |
| 9. | "Catch a Star" | Hay | 3:28 |
| 10. | "Down by the Sea" | Hay, Strykert, Ham, Jerry Speiser | 6:53 |
| Total length: | | | 38:00 |

Business as Usual – 2003 remaster bonus tracks
| No. | Title | Writer(s) | Length |
|---|---|---|---|
| 11. | "Crazy" | Strykert | 2:37 |
| 12. | "Underground" (live) | Hay | 3:49 |
| 13. | "Who Can It Be Now?" (live) | Hay | 3:58 |
| 14. | "F-19" | Hay, Speiser | 3:52 |
| Total length: | | | 52:16 |

Notes

- "Crazy" is a B-side of the "Down Under" single in Australia and North America.
- The live versions of "Underground" and "Who Can It Be Now?" were recorded at a concert at Olympia in São Paulo, Brazil on May 6, 1996 and are also from the 1998 live album Brazil.
- "F-19" is a B-side of the "Be Good Johnny" single in Australia.

== Personnel ==
Credits adapted from the liner notes of the 2003 remaster of Business as Usual.

=== Musicians ===
- Colin Hay – guitar (all tracks), lead vocals (tracks 1–4, 6–13)
- Greg Ham – flute, keyboards, saxophone, "fiddly things" (attributed in the liner notes) (all tracks), background vocals (tracks 1–4, 6–10, 12–13), lead vocals (tracks 5, 11)
- Ron Strykert – guitar, background vocals (all tracks)
- John Rees – bass, background vocals
- Jerry Speiser – drums, background vocals

=== Technical ===
- Peter McIan – production, engineering
- Jim Barbour – engineering
- Paul Ray – additional engineering

=== Artwork ===
- John Dickson – front cover illustration

== Singles ==
- "Who Can It Be Now?" was the first single released from the album. It was released as a single in Australia in June 1981 and in the U.S. in May 1982. It reached #2 on the Australian Kent Music Report Singles Chart in August 1981.
- "Down Under" was the second single released from the album. It was released as a single on 2 November 1981. The single peaked at #1 on the Australian Kent Music Report Singles Chart for six weeks.
- "Be Good Johnny" was the third single and final single released from the album. It was released in April 1982 and reached #8 on the Australian Kent Music Report Singles Chart.

== Charts ==
=== Weekly charts ===
| Chart (1981–83) | Peak position |
|---|---|
| Australian Kent Music Report | 1 |
| Canadian RPM Albums Chart | 1 |
| Dutch Albums Chart | 2 |
| French SNEP Albums Chart | 16 |
| Italian Albums (Musica e dischi) | 5 |
| Japanese Oricon LP Chart | 3 |
| New Zealand Albums Chart | 1 |
| Norwegian VG-lista Albums Chart | 1 |
| Swedish Albums Chart | 15 |
| UK Albums Chart | 1 |
| US Billboard Top LPs & Tape | 1 |
| West German Media Control Albums Chart | 15 |

=== Year-end charts ===
| Chart (1981) | Position |
|---|---|
| Australian Albums Chart | 93 |
| Chart (1982) | Position |
| Australian Albums Chart | 1 |
| Canadian Albums Chart | 1 |
| German Albums (Offizielle Top 100) | 34 |
| New Zealand Albums (RMNZ) | 1 |
| Chart (1983) | Position |
| Australian Albums Chart | 12 |
| Canadian Albums Chart | 8 |
| French Albums Chart | 75 |
| German Albums (Offizielle Top 100) | 38 |
| Japanese Albums Chart (Oricon) | 26 |
| New Zealand Albums (RMNZ) | 34 |
| UK Albums Chart | 13 |
| U.S. Billboard Year-End | 2 |

=== Decade-end charts ===
| Chart (1980–89) | Position |
|---|---|
| Australian Albums Chart | 9 |

== Certifications and sales ==
| Region | Certification | Certified units/sales |
|---|---|---|
| Australia (ARIA) | 4× Platinum | 200,000 |
| Canada (Music Canada) | 5× Platinum | 500,000^{^} |
| Germany (BVMI) | Gold | 250,000^{^} |
| Hong Kong (IFPI Hong Kong) | Gold | 10,000^{*} |
| Netherlands (NVPI) | Gold | 50,000^{^} |
| New Zealand (RMNZ) | Platinum | 15,000^{^} |
| Japan (Oricon Charts) | — | 266,000 |
| United Kingdom (BPI) | Platinum | 300,000^{^} |
| United States (RIAA) | 6× Platinum | 6,000,000^{^} |
| Yugoslavia | — | 22,513 |
| Zimbabwe | — | 2,000 |
Summaries
| Worldwide | — | 10,000,000 |
^{*} Sales figures based on certification alone.^{^} Shipments figures based on certification alone.
