= Two Hearts (Men at Work album) =

Studio album by Men at Work
- Released: 23 April 1985
- Recorded: September 1984 – February 1985
- Studios: Fast Forward Studios, Melbourne
- Genre: Rock
- Length: 36:34
- Label: Columbia
- Producers: Colin Hay, Greg Ham

Men at Work chronology
Cargo (1983)	Two Hearts (1985)	'81-'85 (1986)

Singles from Two Hearts
- 1. "Everything I Need" Released: May 1985; 2. "Maria" Released: 1985; 3. "Hard Luck Story" Released: August 1985; 4. "Sail to You" Released: October 1985

Two Hearts is the third studio album by Australian rock group Men at Work, released on 23 April 1985. Drummer Jerry Speiser and bassist John Rees had left the band prior to the album's production, while guitarist Ron Strykert left the band during recording sessions. Touring behind the album saw sole remaining members Colin Hay and Greg Ham joined by guest musicians. It peaked at No. 16 in Australia, and No. 50 on the US chart.

== Background ==
During 1984 the band took a break as members pursued other interests. Upon reconvening later that year, tensions during rehearsals between Hay and Speiser over songwriting and the band's management led to a split in the band. Both Rees and Speiser were told they were "not required", as Hay, Ham and Strykert used session musicians in their stead: primarily Jeremy Alsop on bass guitar (ex-Ram Band, Pyramid, Broderick Smith) and Mark Kennedy on drums (Spectrum, Ayers Rock, Marcia Hines). Strykert, though credited as a full band member on the finished album, left the group shortly before the album sessions ended, appearing on eight of the ten tracks.

== Reception ==
Professional ratings
Review scores
Source	Rating
AllMusic	2/5 stars

Cash Box said "Australia's most successful (in America) pop band returns from a lengthy hiatus with a well-polished and oft times hard rocking effort which lends meat to the Men At Work legacy. Colin Hay's quirky and distinctive vocals and lyrics are still intact and the groups' execution is much improved. Look for a good response to the singles 'Everything I Need' and 'Man with Two Hearts'."

In a brief retrospective review, AllMusic's Stephen Thomas Erlewine called it "a bland, synthesized variation on mainstream pop, featuring none of the melodic sensibilities or subtle humor of their first two albums."

== Tour ==
Hay and Ham hired new bandmates to tour in support of Two Hearts, with Alsop and Kennedy joined by James Black on guitar and keyboards (Mondo Rock, The Black Sorrows). Soon after a third guitarist, Colin Bayley (Mi-Sex), was added and Kennedy was replaced on drums by Chad Wackerman (Frank Zappa). Australian singers Kate Ceberano and Renée Geyer had also worked on the album and performed live as guest vocalists. On 13 July 1985 Men at Work performed three tracks for the Oz for Africa concert (part of the global Live Aid program)—"Maria", "Overkill", and an unreleased one, "The Longest Night". They were broadcast in Australia (on both Seven Network and Nine Network) and on MTV in the US. "Maria" and "Overkill" were also broadcast by American Broadcasting Company (ABC) during their Live Aid telecast. Ham left during the band's time touring behind the album. The final Men at Work performances during 1985 had jazz saxophonist Paul Williamson (The Black Sorrows), replacing Ham. By early 1986 the band was defunct and Hay started recording his first solo album, Looking for Jack (January 1987), which had Alsop and Wackerman as session musicians.

== Track listing ==
Side one
No.	Title	Writer(s)	Length
1.	"Man with Two Hearts"	Colin Hay	3:56
2.	"Giving Up"	Greg Ham	3:27
3.	"Everything I Need"	Hay	3:35
4.	"Sail to You"	Hay, Ron Strykert, Ham	3:25
5.	"Children on Parade"	Hay	3:37

Side two
No.	Title	Writer(s)	Length
6.	"Maria"	Hay	4:34
7.	"Stay at Home"	Ham	3:07
8.	"Hard Luck Story"	Hay	3:43
9.	"Snakes and Ladders"	Ham	3:17
10.	"Still Life"	Ham	3:53

== Personnel ==
Men at Work

- Greg Ham – keyboards (1, 2, 4, 5, 7–10), vocals (2, 3, 7, 10), drum programming (2, 9, 10), saxophone (5, 7–9)
- Colin Hay – vocals, keyboards (1), guitars (1, 2, 7, 9), drum programming (1–5, 8), marimba (1), acoustic guitar (3, 5, 6, 8, 10), electric guitar (3, 5, 6), drums (3, 8), electric sitar (6), acoustic piano (8), bass (8)
- Ron Strykert – guitars (1, 2, 4, 7, 8, 10), bass (1), guitar synthesizer (4), electric guitar (5, 6), pedal steel guitar (5), acoustic guitar (6)

Session musicians

- George Butrumlis – piano accordion (6)
- Phil Colson – slide guitar (3)
- James Black – guitars (9)
- Jeremy Alsop – bass (2, 4–7, 9, 10)
- Paul Gadsby – bass (3)
- Mark Kennedy – drums (1, 2, 4, 7), percussion (1, 4–6, 8, 10)
- J. J. Hackett – drums (6), percussion (6)
- Kate Ceberano – vocals (2, 7)
- Renée Geyer – vocals (6)

=== Production ===
- Greg Ham – producer, mixing
- Colin Hay – producer, mixing
- Tim Kramer – engineer, mixing (5)
- Bob Clearmountain – mixing (1–4, 6–10)
- Dave Greenberg – mix engineer
- Karen Hewitt – assistant engineer
- Gary Constable – technical assistant
- Clyde Terry – cover design
- Roger Gould – photography
- Hiro Ito – inside cover photography
- Greg Noakes – inside cover photography
- Russell Deppeler – management

== Charts ==
Chart (1985)	Peak position
Australian (Kent Music Report)	16
Canada Top Albums/CDs (RPM)	48
US Billboard 200	50
