= Jerry Speiser =

Australian drummer (born 1953)

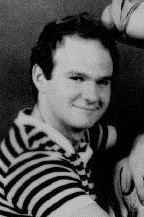
- Speiser in 1983

Background information
- Born: Jerry Harold Speiser; 12 August 1953 (age 72); Australia
- Genres: Pop, new wave
- Occupation: Drummer
- Years active: 1979–present

Jerry Harold Speiser (born 12 August 1953) is an Australian musician. He is best known as the drummer and a founding member of 1980s pop/new wave group Men at Work, which had Australian, US and UK hits with their singles "Who Can It Be Now?" and "Down Under" and their albums Business as Usual and Cargo. He left the band in 1984 and was a member of other groups including FX, One World and Frost.

== Biography ==
In an early session, he played on Greg Sneddon's Mind Stroll album in 1974, Sneddon was also part of the initial Men at Work line-up. He was also a drummer in a local band called Numbers in 1978 and early 1979. He helped form Men At Work in 1979 Along with Colin Hay and Ron Strykert with the latter two having already played as an acoustic duo. They were joined by Greg Ham and John Rees. They released their first two albums. Business as Usual (with their signature hit "Down Under") and Cargo which are both successful. His drumming in the band played a big part in the bands sound. In 1984 while in the process of recording their third album Two Hearts, both he and Rees were asked to leave the band due to disagreements with the band's manager.

Following Men at Work's break-up in 1986, he briefly joined pop band FX (featuring keyboard player John McCubbery), and then Ross Hannaford's band One World as a guitarist. In 1986, he and former Men at Work producer and sound engineer Peter McIan had a short stint with American band The city, where he played the drums while McIan played keyboards and produced the album Foundation. After that, Speiser joined pop rockers Frost where he played the drums in the single "You and Me" from their album The Usual Suspects.

Speiser (drums/vocals) and Ben Fitzgerald (guitars/vocals) co-founded a guitar-driven style rock band Where's Claire? In 1990, they were joined by Andrew Midson (bass guitar/vocals) and Brenden Mason (guitars/vocals) and released their first commercial album, Long Time Coming, in 2002. He also formed his own low keyed rock band The Working Stiffs and had a single called "Who Can It Be Down Under?" By 2012 Speiser was a drummer for an Australian band called After Burner.
