= Dr. Heckyll & Mr. Jive (song) =

- UK 7-inch single sleeve

Single by Men at Work

from the album Cargo
- Released: October 1982
- Genre: Pop rock; new wave
- Length: 4:12 (7-inch single), 4:38 (12-inch single/album)
- Label: Columbia
- Songwriter: Colin Hay
- Producer: Peter McIan

Men at Work singles chronology
"Be Good Johnny" (1982)	"Dr. Heckyll & Mr. Jive" (1982)	"Overkill" (1983)

"Dr. Heckyll & Mr. Jive" is a song by the Australian musical group Men at Work. The song was written by Men at Work singer/guitarist Colin Hay, and the recording was produced by Peter McIan. It was released in October 1982 in Australia as the lead single from their second album Cargo (1983); in the United States it was the band's third single from that album.

The song is about a mad scientist named Dr. Heckyll (played by Men at Work keyboardist Greg Ham in the song's music video) who creates a potion that turns him into a smooth, handsome and talkative man. The title is a parody of Robert Louis Stevenson's 1886 novella The Strange Case of Dr Jekyll and Mr Hyde.

Cash Box said that "sci-fi flick laboratory sounds lend authenticity to an otherwise Men At Work-manlike lively rhythmic and vocal tune."

== Music video ==
The music video shows a Sherlock Holmes-esque detective (Colin Hay) who investigates the case of Dr. Heckyll (Greg Ham), a quirky mad scientist. One night, Heckyll goes out to a party at a house in the neighborhood and takes a swig of the potion he has been working on most recently. Two girls walk in on him, harass him and also take swigs of the drink. They turn into palm trees as a result. Heckyll notices this effect, and transforms into Mr. Jive, a handsome, talkative man who entertains people by playing the piano. The detective, under disguise as a Boy Scouts leader, arrives, but before he can investigate further, Heckyll reverts to normal form and, with his hunchbacked assistant (Jerry Speiser) leaves satisfied and happy into the sunrise.

The video was shot in Los Angeles, California, in 1982.

The band members also appear as Boy Scouts, party guests (Strykert and Hay) and John Reese as a street performer playing a bass harmonica in the intro.

== Track listing ==
=== 7-inch: CBS / BA 222986 Australia 1982 ===
1. "Dr. Heckyll & Mr. Jive" – 4:12
2. "Shintaro" – 2:51

=== 7-inch: Epic / A 6276 Japan 1983 ===
1. "Dr. Heckyll & Mr. Jive" – 4:12
2. "No Restrictions" – 4:29

=== 7-inch: Columbia / TA 6276 USA 1983 ===
1. "Dr. Heckyll & Mr. Jive" – 4:12
2. "I Like To (Live)" – 4:23

=== 12-inch Maxi-Single: Epic / TA 3668 UK 1983 ===
1. "Dr. Heckyll & Mr. Jive" – 4:36
2. "No Restrictions" – 4:29
3. "Down Under (Live Version)" – 4:30
4. "Be Good Johnny (Live Version)" – 4:32

== Charts ==
=== Weekly charts ===
Weekly chart performance for "Dr. Heckyll & Mr. Jive"
Chart (1982–1983)	Peak position
Australia (Kent Music Report)	6
Canada (RPM Magazine)	24
Ireland (IRMA)	25
New Zealand (RIANZ)	16
United Kingdom (The Official Charts Company)	31
U.S. Billboard Hot 100	28
U.S. Cashbox Top 100	26
U.S. Billboard Hot Mainstream Rock Tracks	12

=== Year-end charts ===
Year-end chart performance for "Dr. Heckyll & Mr. Jive"
Chart (1983)	Position
Australia (Kent Music Report)	88
