= It's a Mistake =

Single by Men at Work

from the album Cargo
- B-side: "No Restrictions" (Australia) "Shintaro" (international)
- Released: June 1983
- Recorded: 1982
- Genre: New wave; reggae rock
- Length: 4:33
- Label: Columbia
- Songwriter: Colin Hay
- Producer: Peter McIan

Men at Work singles chronology
"Overkill" (1983)	"It's a Mistake" (1983)	"High Wire" (1983)

"It's a Mistake" is a song by the Australian band Men at Work. The song was written by lead singer and guitarist Colin Hay and the recording was produced by Peter McIan. It was released in June 1983, as the third Australian and second American single from their album Cargo and peaked at #34 in Australia. In the US, it entered the charts at #42 on July 2, 1983, and peaked at #6 on the Billboard Hot 100 in August 1983 becoming the band's fourth and final top 10 hit. It was performed live on Saturday Night Live on 22 October 1983.

== Content ==
"It's a Mistake" is an anti-war song. The song's lyrics deal with the mindset of military men across the world in the 1980s, wondering if and when the countries of NATO and the communist states of the Warsaw Pact would end the Cold War standoff with conventional battle or a nuclear exchange. Hay sings in the persona of a mid-level officer wishing to learn from his superiors if his men are going to war or not.

== Music video ==
The video, which had moderate rotation on MTV (as opposed to the band's singles from their Business as Usual album), told a satirical story of the outbreak of a war between the Eastern and Western blocs. The beginning of the video starts with a stop-motion animation of Eagle Force toy soldiers and some tanks. It cuts to the five band members dressed as children playing "soldiers" and being invited into an officer's tent by an American officer, inside of which are many allied officers of various services drinking and partying. The video then shows four adult men who are working as a businessman, a road worker, a war protester, and a doctor. The video then shows each of them fading into a military uniform vaguely corresponding to each of their peacetime professions with a surprised look on their faces, as to imply they were drafted. Then, they are seen walking through a burnt out forest and come across some elderly women, who beat the soldiers with umbrellas. One of the soldiers takes aim but upon realizing what is happening lowers his weapon. The latter half of the video is mostly set in an underground bunker or "War Room" similar to the NORAD facility of Cheyenne Mountain, and the band seems to engage in a semi-retelling of the 1964 black comedy film Dr. Strangelove. At the end of the video, the officer is nervously tapping his fingers and inadvertently knocks open the protective cover from the nuclear button, which is right next to his ashtray. Then, when he goes to stub out his cigar in the ashtray, he accidentally hits the button instead.

== Track listing ==
=== 7-inch: CBS / BA 223076 Australia 1983 ===
1. "It's a Mistake" (Colin Hay) – 4:33
2. "No Restrictions" (Ron Strykert) – 4:29

=== 7-inch: Epic / 07·5P-235 Japan 1983 ===
1. "It's a Mistake" (Colin Hay) – 4:34
2. "Shintaro" (Ron Strykert) – 2:51

=== 7-inch: Columbia / 38-03959 US 1983 ===
1. "It's a Mistake" (Colin Hay) – 4:33
2. "Shintaro" (Ron Strykert) – 2:51

=== 12-inch Maxi-Single: CBS / 12.3475 Europe 1983 ===
1. "It's a Mistake" (Colin Hay) – 4:33
2. "Shintaro" (Ron Strykert) – 2:51
3. "Be Good Johnny" (Colin Hay, Greg Ham) – 3:34

=== 12-inch Remastered Single: Columbia / 44-03977 US 1983 ===
1. "It's a Mistake" (Colin Hay) – a special re-mastered version of "It's a Mistake" – 4:33
2. "Who Can It Be Now?" (Colin Hay) – a special re-mastered version of "Who Can It Be Now?" – the original version was released on Men at Work's 1981 debut album Business as Usual – 3:21
3. "F 19" (Colin Hay, Jerry Speiser) – previously unreleased – 3:49

== Charts ==
=== Weekly charts ===
Chart (1983)	Peak position
Australia (Kent Music Report)	34
Canada (RPM Magazine)	20
Germany (Media Control Charts)	19
Ireland (IRMA)	11
New Zealand (RIANZ)	43
UK Singles (The Official Charts Company)	33
US Billboard Hot 100	6
US Billboard Adult Contemporary	10
US Billboard Top Rock Tracks	27
US Cash Box Top 100	12

=== Year-end charts ===
Chart (1983)	Rank
U.S. Billboard Hot 100	76
U.S. Cash Box	82
