= Be Good Johnny =

1982 single by Men at Work

Single by Men at Work

from the album Business as Usual
- B-side: "F-19"
- Released: April 1982
- Recorded: 1981
- Genre: Power pop; new wave
- Length: 3:35
- Label: Columbia
- Songwriters: Colin Hay; Greg Ham
- Producer: Peter McIan

Men at Work singles chronology
"Down Under" (1981)	"Be Good Johnny" (1982)	"Dr. Heckyll & Mr. Jive" (1982)

Music video
- "Be Good Johnny" on YouTube

"Be Good Johnny" is a song by Australian band Men at Work, released in April 1982 as the third and final single from their debut album, Business as Usual (1981).

== Content ==
The song is written from the viewpoint of a 9-year-old boy who is constantly being told to be good, but prefers to daydream rather than concentrate in class or play sports. Johnny feels like he understands some of his instructions, but also that he is completely misunderstood by the adult world. The lead singer, Colin Hay, uses his voice in different ways throughout the song to imitate Johnny, Johnny's mother and father, and his teacher. The song also features spoken dialogue by keyboardist Greg Ham as he tries to figure out what Johnny is like. The title of the song is a reference to the Chuck Berry song "Johnny B. Goode".

== Cover versions ==
Colin Hay covered a solo version on his album Man @ Work, and this version is used as the theme song of the American version of the reality TV program Supernanny.

== Charts ==
=== Weekly charts ===
Chart (1982–83)	Peak positions
Australia (Kent Music Report)	8
Canada (RPM)	18
New Zealand (RIANZ)	3
UK Singles (Official Charts Company)	78
U.S. Billboard Top Tracks	3

=== Year-end charts ===
Chart (1982)	Positions
Australia (Kent Music Report)	67
