= Ron Strykert =

Australian musician (born 1957)

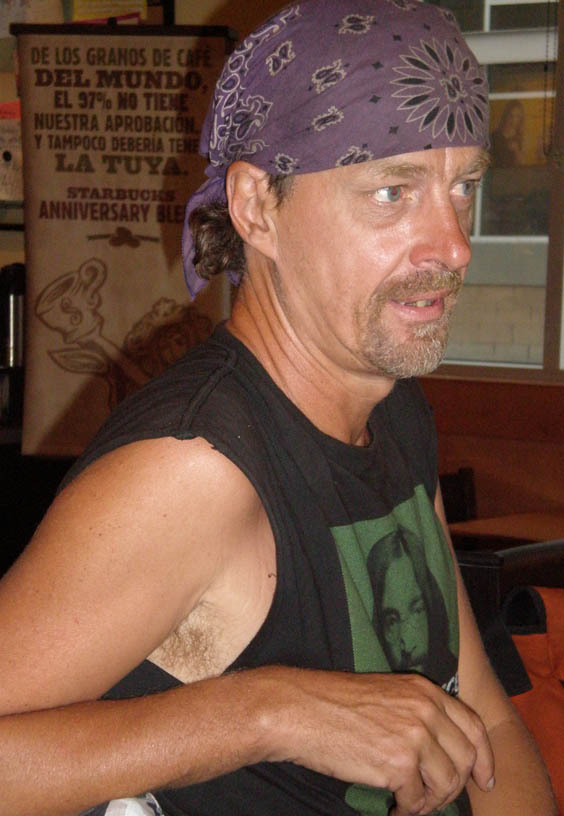
- Strykert in 2009

Background information
- Born: Ronald Graham Strykert; 18 August 1957 (age 69); Korumburra, Victoria, Australia
- Genres: Pop, rock, new wave, acoustic
- Occupations: Singer, songwriter, producer
- Instruments: Vocals, guitar, bass guitar, percussion
- Years active: 1978–present
- Labels: Columbia Records; Le Coq Musique
- Formerly of: Men at Work

Ronald Graham Strykert (born 18 August 1957) is an Australian musician. He is best known for playing lead guitar, co-founding and composing songs with the 1980s band Men at Work.

== Career ==
Strykert co-founded Men at Work with Colin Hay as an acoustic duo in 1978, regularly performing at the Cricketer's Arms Hotel in Richmond, Victoria. From 1979 to 1985 he provided guitar, vocals and bass guitar for that group. He contributed to all three Men at Work studio albums. He wrote or co-wrote many of their songs, including "Down Under" which appears on their first album Business as Usual. He sings lead vocals on "Settle Down My Boy", one of his self composed songs on their second album Cargo.

Strykert played bass guitar on the very first recordings of the early group in a stage musical called Riff Raff in 1979. When bassist John Rees was later added in 1980 to the band, he moved forward to lead guitarist. He developed a unique soaring style of playing which added a high amount of energy to their songs. His signature playing went from long sustained notes, to a rapid fire, staccato lead guitar style, with some similarities to bass technique, most often using a customised Yamaha SC-800 guitar with EMG S pickups. He would often duel with fellow guitarist Hay adding dimension to his presentation as well as blending strong backing vocals. He often weaved his guitar playing around the stylistic playing of Greg Ham on his keyboards, saxophone, clarinet and flute.

As a founding member of the group, Strykert was concerned when the group lost their rhythm section of Jerry Speiser and Rees. During the process of recording their Two Hearts album in 1985, he decided to leave the group.

== Legal troubles ==
On 15 February 2009, Strykert was arrested for allegedly making death threats against former bandmate Colin Hay. Strykert denied making any such threat (which was said to have occurred during a phone call), and Hay told investigators he did not believe the guitarist would carry out the threat.

== Compositions ==
Strykert composed and co-composed 13 songs for Men at Work:

Title	Composed	From
"Keypunch Operator"	Hay & Strykert	Early single
"Down Under"	Hay & Strykert	B side to early single, A side single & Business as Usual
"Anyone for Tennis"	Hay, Strykert, Ham, Speiser & Rees	B side to "Who Can It Be Now?" single
"Crazy"	Strykert	B side to "Down Under" single
"People Just Love to Play with Words"	Strykert	Business as Usual
"Touching the Untouchables"	Hay & Strykert	Business as Usual
"Down by the Sea"	Hay, Ham, Strykert & Speiser	Business as Usual
"Settle Down My Boy"	Strykert	Cargo
"Upstairs in My House"	Hay & Strykert	B side to "Dr. Heckyl & Mr. Jive" 12" & Cargo
"I Like To"	Strykert	Cargo. A live version of this song appears as the US B-Side of "Dr. Heckyl & Mr. Jive".
"Shintaro"	Strykert	B side to "It's a Mistake" single
"'Till the Money Runs Out"	Hay, Strykert, Ham, Speiser & Rees	B side to "Overkill" single
"Sail to You"	Hay, Strykert & Ham	Two Hearts

== Release performance ==
Strykert took part in 13 singles released by Men at Work. Nine of them charted. He took part in three albums released. All three charted.

== Awards ==
Strykert with Men at Work won the following awards:

- 1983 United States Grammy Award for "Best New Artist"
- 1983 Canadian Juno Award for "International LP of the Year" for Business as Usual

Hay and Strykert received the following awards from APRA Awards for their composition "Down Under":

- 1985 Special Award
- No. 4 on the APRA Top 30 Australian songs list

== Solo release ==
In 2003, Strykert released a solo debut titled Paradise on compact disc. It was released by independent label Le Coq Musique and contained the following tracks composed and produced by Strykert:

Track	Title	Time
1	"In The Air"	3:06
2	"Heartbeat"	2:54
3	"Do I Love You?"	3:48
4	"Paradigm Shift"	2:49
5	"Shiva Shambu"	5:02
6	"Show Us The Way Home"	4:52
7	"Love Train"	5:07
8	"Sunrise"	5:42
9	"Eternal Waves"	5:26
