= Who Can It Be Now? =

1981 single by Men at Work

- Australian single sleeve

Single by Men at Work

from the album Business as Usual
- B-side: "Anyone for Tennis" (instrumental)
- Released: 25 May 1981 (Australia); May 1982 (US)
- Recorded: Early 1981
- Genre: Pop rock; new wave
- Length: 3:23
- Label: Columbia
- Songwriter: Colin Hay
- Producer: Peter McIan

Men at Work singles chronology
"Keypunch Operator" (1980)	"Who Can It Be Now?" (1981)	"Down Under" (1981)

"Who Can It Be Now?" is a song by Australian band Men at Work. It was released in Australia in 1981, prior to the recording of their 1981 debut album Business as Usual, on which the track was later included as its opening track.

"Who Can It Be Now?" reached No. 2 on the Australian singles chart in August that year, and was awarded a gold disc for sales of over 50,000 copies in Australia. The song also hit No. 45 in New Zealand. Released in Canada in early 1982, the track peaked at No. 8 in late July. This spurred an American release of the song, and the single, by then well over a year old, went on to hit No. 1 in the US in October 1982. "Who Can It Be Now?", directed by Tony Stevens, was also a modest hit in the UK, reaching No. 45. As one of Men at Work's biggest hits, it was featured on their later compilation albums, and a live version can be found on Brazil. The song remains a popular symbol of new wave music and has been featured on numerous 1980s compilations. The band performed both this song and "Down Under" live on Saturday Night Live on 23 October 1982.

At the 1981 Countdown Australian Music Awards, the song won Best Debut Single.

== Writing and recording ==
Around 1979, lead vocalist Colin Hay wrote the music for "Who Can It Be Now?" in a tree house he and his girlfriend made in Bermagui, New South Wales. The lyrics would not come until 1981, when Hay was living in an apartment complex in St Kilda, Victoria. He lived next to drug dealers, and people would often confuse Hay's apartment for the dealers'. The number of people that would knock on his door unnerved him to the point where he was scared to open his door, regardless of who was there. At the time, Hay was also anxious about his music career, which had yet to take off. In a 2015 interview, Hay explained: "I was trying to get out of the situation I was in, which is that I didn't really have any money...It seemed at that particular time everyone who knocked on my door wanted something from me that I either didn't have or didn't want to give them. That could be money, or it could simply be time that I didn’t want to give them."

Men at Work began recording their debut album Business as Usual, which featured "Who Can It Be Now?", in 1981 with producer Peter McIan. The song opens with a saxophone hook by Greg Ham; Hay had originally written the saxophone section later in the song, but McIan suggested moving the hook to the introduction. While recording the song, McIan wanted a saxophone solo and told Ham to play anything just to get the sound. McIan used Ham's improvised composition as the solo in the song.

== Critical reception ==
David Fricke of Rolling Stone commended it by noting "Ham's blowsy sax and the rousing chorus of voices raised in alcoholic harmony spark the rugged boogie of 'Who Can It Be Now?'"

In a retrospective review, AllMusic's Stephen Thomas Erlewine called the song an "excellent single that merged straight-ahead pop/rock hooks with a quirky new wave production and an offbeat sense of humor."

Heather Phares reviewed the song specifically and summed up by saying "In keeping with current trends but just quirky enough to be instantly memorable, the song seems custom-built for repeated play; it's easy to see why it became one of 1982's biggest hits, as well as a definitive new wave single." By contrast, Barney Hoskyns of NME called it an "abomination".

== Charts ==
=== Weekly charts ===
Chart (1981–1983)	Peak positions
Australia (Kent Music Report)	2
Canada Top Singles (RPM)	8
France (IFOP)	20
Ireland (IRMA)	18
Israel	1
Italy (Musica e dischi)	10
Netherlands (Single Top 100)	49
New Zealand (Recorded Music NZ)	45
South Africa (Springbok Radio)	5
UK Singles (Official Charts)	45
US Billboard Hot 100	1
US Billboard Hot Dance Club Play	33
US Billboard Top Tracks	46
US Cash Box	1
West Germany (GfK)	71

=== Year-end charts ===
Chart (1982)	Rank
Australia (Kent Music Report)	9
Canada Top Singles (RPM)	57
US Billboard Hot 100	30

== Certifications ==
Region	Certification	Certified units/sales
Australia (ARIA)	Gold	50,000^{^}
Canada (Music Canada)	Gold	50,000^{^}
New Zealand (RMNZ)	Platinum	30,000^{‡}
United Kingdom (BPI) Sales since 2004	Silver	200,000^{‡}
^{^} Shipments figures based on certification alone.^{‡} Sales+streaming figures based on certification alone.

== See also ==
- List of Billboard Hot 100 number-one singles of 1982
- List of Cash Box Top 100 number-one singles of 1982
