= Greg Ham =

Australian musician (1953–2012)

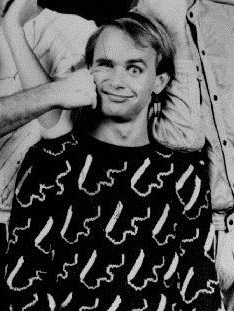
- Ham in a 1983 photoshoot with Men at Work

Background information
- Born: Gregory Norman Ham; 27 September 1953; Melbourne, Victoria, Australia
- Died: 15 April 2012 (aged 58) Carlton North, Victoria, Australia
- Genres: Pop rock; new wave; post-punk; reggae rock
- Occupation: Musician
- Instruments: Keyboards; saxophone; flute; harmonica; guitar; vocals
- Years active: 1979–2012
- Label: EMI

Gregory Norman Ham (27 September 1953 – 15 April 2012) was an Australian musician. He was best known as a member of the 1980s band Men at Work. Besides singing and being occasional lead vocalist of the band, he played saxophone, flute, harmonica, guitar, organ, piano and synthesizer.

== Early life ==
Ham was born in Melbourne and attended Camberwell Grammar School from 1964 to 1971. According to the school's year books, he was remembered for his acting talent in school plays, particularly The World We Live In (the insect comedy) in 1969 where he played the "parasite". In 1970 he played Mr Seekamp, editor of the Ballarat Times, in Lola Montez and, in 1971, Puff in The Critic. In 1967 Ham was photographed airborne by J. Jones in a still photo which won first prize in the Ilford Competition.

== Career ==
=== Men at Work ===
In 1972, Ham met Colin Hay via mutual friend Kym Gyngell. In 1979, he joined the original lineup of Men at Work with Hay, Ron Strykert, and Jerry Speiser. Ham and Hay formed the core of the band from 1979 until 1985 when Ham left, and the band broke up shortly afterward. Ham returned to Men at Work when they reformed in 1996 to tour the United States.

Ham played saxophone, keyboards, flute and harmonica for the group as well as performing backing vocals. He sang lead vocals on songs such as "Helpless Automaton" and "I Like To". He also played the saxophone solo in the song "Who Can It Be Now?" (a rehearsal take was used in the final mix) and improvised the flute riff in the song "Down Under".

In 1983, Ham, as a member of Men at Work, won a Grammy Award for Best New Artist.

=== Lawsuit and plagiarism accusation ===
Larrikin Records bought the rights to the 1930s children's song "Kookaburra" in 1990 for $6,100. In 2009, music publisher Larrikin Music, then headed by Norman Lurie, sued Men at Work and their record label EMI for plagiarism, alleging that the flute riff copied the 1934 nursery rhyme "Kookaburra", to which they owned the publishing rights. The Federal Court of Australia ruled that "Down Under" did infringe the copyright of "Kookaburra" and awarded Larrikin 5% of the song's mechanical royalties backdated to 2002. Several appeals by EMI and Men at Work were unsuccessful. In an interview with The Age newspaper, Ham said he was deeply affected by the judgment and felt it tarnished his reputation, saying: "I'm terribly disappointed that that's the way I'm going to be remembered—for copying something."

=== Later career ===
Ham played brass and keyboard with the R&B band Relax with Max, with frontman Max Vella, girlfriend Linda "Toots" Wostry on saxophone, James Black on keyboard, David Adam and Ross Hannaford on guitar and John James "JJ" Hackett on drums. Relax with Max played at the Metropol in Fitzroy and on ABC's television comedy While You're Down There and at the Falls Creek music festival. They supported Australian artists including Kylie Minogue and American soul singers James Brown and Bo Diddley. Ham also performed regularly with jazz ensemble Miss Dorothy and His Fools in Love. Later in life, Ham taught guitar at Carlton North Primary School and assessed music students for the Victorian Certificate of Education (VCE).

== Death ==
Ham was found dead on 19 April 2012 at his home in Carlton North, Melbourne. Several newspapers listed the cause as a heart attack. Friends of Ham had told newspapers that he had a long battle with heroin addiction, which had escalated after the "Kookaburra" trial. It is known that he was depressed and suffering anxiety over the "Kookaburra" copyright lawsuit.

Ham's private funeral was held at the Fitzroy Town Hall in Melbourne on 2 May 2012. He was survived by his two children. Colin Hay remembered Ham as “a great, great friend and a great guy” who was a "very inspired and instinctive" musician."
