= Down Under (song) =

1981 single by Men at Work

- 7-inch Australian variant of standard artwork

Single by Men at Work

from the album Business as Usual
- B-side: "Crazy" (AUS/US) "Helpless Automaton" (EU) "Anyone for Tennis" (CAN)
- Released: November 2, 1981 (original release) / October 19, 1982 (US)
- Genre: New wave; pop rock; pub rock; reggae
- Length: 3:42
- Label: Columbia
- Composers: Colin Hay; Ron Strykert
- Lyricist: Colin Hay
- Producer: Peter McIan

Men at Work singles chronology
"Who Can It Be Now?" (1981)	"Down Under" (1981)	"Be Good Johnny" (1982)

Audio sample
- file; help

Music videos
- "Down Under" on YouTube

"Down Under" is a song recorded by Australian rock band Men at Work. It was originally self-released in 1980 as the B-side to their first local single, "Keypunch Operator", before the band signed a recording contract with Columbia Records. Both early songs were written by the group's co-founders, Colin Hay and Ron Strykert. The early version of "Down Under" has a slightly slower tempo and different arrangement from the later Columbia release. The best-known version was then released on Columbia in 1981 as the second single from Men at Work's debut studio album, Business as Usual.

The hit song went to number one in their home country Australia in December 1981, and then topped the New Zealand charts in February 1982. The song topped the Canadian charts in October 1982. In the United States, the song debuted on the Billboard Hot 100 on 6 November 1982 at No. 79, and reached No. 1 in January 1983. Topping the US Billboard chart for four non-consecutive weeks, it eventually sold over two million copies in the US alone. Billboard ranked it at No. 4 for 1983. In the UK, the song topped the charts in January and February 1983: the only Men at Work song to make the UK top 20. The song also went to No. 1 in Denmark, Ireland, Italy and Switzerland, and was a top 10 hit in many other countries.

"Down Under" is perceived as a patriotic song in Australia, often jokingly citing the song as "the real Australian National Anthem"; it remains popular and is often played at sporting events. In January 2018, as part of Triple M's "Ozzest 100", the 'most Australian' songs of all time so far, "Down Under" was ranked number 2 behind Cold Chisel's "Khe Sanh".

== Lyrics ==
The lyrics of "Down Under" depict an Australian man travelling the globe (specifically mentioning Brussels and Bombay, as well as the hippie trail), meeting people who are interested in his home country. The story is based in part on singer Colin Hay's own travels abroad, including a prominent reference to a Vegemite sandwich, which derived from an encounter with a tall baker from Brussels who emigrated from Brunswick, Melbourne (Vegemite was not actually available in Belgium at the time the song was written). Hay has said the lyric was partly inspired by Barry Humphries' character Barry McKenzie, a comically stereotypical Australian travelling abroad.

Slang and drug terms are featured in the lyrics. It opens with the singer "travelling in a fried-out Kombi, on a hippie trail, head full of zombie". In Australian slang, "fried-out" at that time meant that it is in really poor condition and overheating (as in a short circuit rather than drunk/high), "Kombi" is short for "Kombinationskraftwagen" and refers to the Volkswagen Type 2, and "full of zombie" refers to the use of a type of marijuana. "Hippie trail" refers to a subcultural tourist route popular in the 1960s and 1970s which stretched from Western Europe to South-East Asia. The song also contains the refrain "where beer does flow and men chunder". To "chunder" means to vomit.

Speaking to Songfacts about the meaning of the lyrics, Hay remarked:

The chorus is really about the selling of Australia in many ways, the overdevelopment of the country. It was a song about the loss of spirit in that country. It's really about the plundering of the country by greedy people. It is ultimately about celebrating the country, but not in a nationalistic way and not in a flag-waving sense. It's really more than that.

The music video comically plays out the events in the lyrics, showing Hay and other band members riding in a Volkswagen Kombi van, eating muesli with a "strange lady", eating and drinking in a café, and lying in an opium den. The band are moved along at one point by a man in a shirt and tie who places a "Sold" sign in the ground. Exterior shots were filmed at the Cronulla sand dunes in Sydney. At the end, the band are seen carrying a coffin across the dunes. Hay explained that was a warning to his fellow Australians that their country's identity was dying as a result of overdevelopment and Americanization. Hay has also stated that the same ominous sentiment lies behind the choral line, "Can't you hear that thunder? You'd better run; you'd better take cover".

== Critical reception ==
Billboard called it a "tongue-in-cheek story song that relies on percussion and vocals more than sax."

== Cultural significance ==
The song is a perennial favorite on Australian radio and television, and topped the charts in the US and UK simultaneously in early 1983. It was later used as a theme song by the crew of Australia II in their successful bid to win the America's Cup in 1983. Men at Work played this song in the closing ceremony of the 2000 Summer Olympics in Sydney, alongside other Australian artists. It was the final song played during the state memorial service of Bob Hawke, held in the Sydney Opera House on June 14th, 2019, headed with a special didgeridoo opening by classical didgeridooist William Barton.

The song is also the walkout music for Australian current, two-time UFC Featherweight Champion Alexander Volkanovski, and for Australian darts player Simon Whitlock.

In May 2001, Australasian Performing Right Association (APRA) celebrated its 75th anniversary by naming the Best Australian Songs from 1926 to 2001, as decided by a hundred-strong industry panel. "Down Under" was ranked as the fourth song on the list.

The song was ranked number 96 on VH1's "100 Greatest Songs of the 1980s" in October 2006.

"Down Under" was added to the National Film and Sound Archive's Sounds of Australia registry in 2007.

"Down Under" was one of the goal songs for Australia during the 2022 FIFA World Cup.

"Down Under" was named the greatest song of all time on Triple M's GOAT 600 countdown in 2024.

In 2025, the song placed 21 in the Triple J Hottest 100 of Australian Songs.

In 2026, Australian baseball player Travis Bazzana used the song as his walk up music.

== Copyright lawsuit ==
In 2007, on the ABC-TV quiz show Spicks and Specks, the question was posed, "Name the Australian nursery rhyme this riff has been based on, as well as the name of the man playing it?" The answer, "Kookaburra", a song rights to which were owned by Larrikin Music, resulted in phone calls and emails to Larrikin the next day. Larrikin Music subsequently decided to take legal action against Hay and Strykert, the song's writers.

Sections of the flute part of the recording of the song were found to be based on "Kookaburra", written in 1932 by Marion Sinclair. In fact, producer Peter McIan remembered the inclusion of the melody being a "musical joke" by flutist Greg Ham – he can even be seen sitting on a gum tree in the song's music video while playing the riff. Sinclair died in 1988 and the rights to "Kookaburra" were deemed to have been transferred to publisher Larrikin Music on 21 March 1990. In the United States, the rights are administered by Music Sales Corporation in New York City.

In June 2009, 28 years after the release of the recording, Larrikin Music sued Men at Work for copyright infringement, alleging that part of the flute riff of "Down Under" was copied from "Kookaburra". The counsel for the band's record label and publishing company (Sony BMG Music Entertainment and EMI Songs Australia) claimed that, based on the agreement under which the song was written, the copyright was actually held by the Girl Guides Association. On 30 July, Justice Peter Jacobson of the Federal Court of Australia made a preliminary ruling that Larrikin did own copyright on the song, but the issue of whether or not Hay and Strykert had plagiarized the riff was set aside to be determined at a later date.

On 4 February 2010, Jacobson ruled that Larrikin's copyright had been infringed because "Down Under" reproduced "a substantial part of 'Kookaburra'".

When asked how much Larrikin would be seeking in damages, Larrikin's lawyer Adam Simpson replied: "anything from what we've claimed, which is between 40 and 60 per cent, and what they suggest, which is considerably less." In court, Larrikin's principal Norman Lurie gave the opinion that, had the parties negotiated a license at the outset as willing parties, the royalties would have been between 25 and 50 per cent. On 6 July 2010, Jacobson handed down a decision that Larrikin receive 5% of royalties from 2002. In October 2011, the band lost its final court bid when the High Court of Australia refused to hear an appeal.

Until this high-profile case, the standing of "Kookaburra" as a traditional song, combined with the lack of visible policing of the song's rights by its composer, had led to the general public perception that the song was within the public domain.

The revelation of the copyright status of "Kookaburra", and more so the pursuit of royalties from it, has generated a negative response among sections of the Australian public. In response to unsourced speculation of a Welsh connection, Rhidian Griffiths pointed out that the Welsh words to the tune were published in 1989, and musicologist Phyllis Kinney stated neither the song's metre nor its lines were typical Welsh.

Colin Hay has since suggested that the deaths of his father, Jim, in 2010, and Men at Work flute player Greg Ham, in 2012, were directly linked to the stress of the court case.

The story of the lawsuit was featured on an episode of Tim Harford's podcast, Cautionary Tales—"The Nursery Rhyme That Ruined a Rock Band."

== Use at protest events ==
On 23 January 2026, Colin Hay denounced the use of "Down Under" at March for Australia anti-immigration demonstrations. According to Seven News, Hay, a Scottish immigrant married to Peruvian-born musician Cecilia Noël, posted on Instagram:

“Let me say that I most strenuously disapprove of any unauthorized, unlicensed use of Down Under, for any ‘March For Australia’ events.

Down Under, a song I co-wrote, does not belong to those who attempt to sow xenophobia within the fabric of our great land, our great people.

Down Under is ultimately a song of celebration. It’s for pluralism and inclusion; unity, not division.

Go write your own song,

leave mine alone.”

– Colin Hay (immigrant)

== Track listing ==
=== 7-inch: CBS / BA 222891 Australia ===
1. "Down Under" – 3:44
2. "Crazy" – 2:34

=== 7-inch: CBS / A 2066 Europe ===
1. "Down Under" – 3:44
2. "Helpless Automaton" – 3:23

=== 7-inch: CBS / 43.539 Brazil ===
1. "Down Under" – 3:44
2. "Who Can It Be Now?" – 3:21

=== 12-inch: CBS / BA 12229 Australia / Promo-release 1986 ===
1. "Down Under (Extended mix)" – 5:30
2. "Sail to You (Extended mix)" – 5:48

=== 7-inch: Columbia / 38-03303 USA ===
1. "Down Under" – 3:44
2. "Crazy" – 2:34

== Charts ==
=== Weekly charts ===
Chart (1981–1983)	Peak position
Australia (Kent Music Report)	1
Belgium (Ultratop 50 Flanders)	6
Canada Top Singles (RPM)	1
Finland (Suomen virallinen lista)	4
France (IFOP)	55
Germany (GfK)	9
Ireland (IRMA)	1
Netherlands (Dutch Top 40)	2
Netherlands (Single Top 100)	2
New Zealand (Recorded Music NZ)	1
Norway (VG-lista)	2
South Africa (Springbok Radio)	2
Sweden (Sverigetopplistan)	6
Switzerland (Schweizer Hitparade)	1
UK Singles (Official Charts)	1
US Billboard Hot 100	1
US Billboard Adult Contemporary	13
US Billboard Hot Dance Club Play	33
US Billboard Mainstream Rock	1
US Cash Box Top 100	1

Chart (2020–2026)	Peak position
Global Excl. US (Billboard)	199
Hungary (Single Top 40)	22
Poland Airplay (ZPAV)	79

=== Year-end charts ===
Chart (1981)	Position
Australia (Kent Music Report)	88

Chart (1982)	Position
Australia (Kent Music Report)	24
Belgium (Ultratop 50 Flanders)	41
Canada Top Singles (RPM)	11
Netherlands (Dutch Top 40)	16
Netherlands (Single Top 100)	15
New Zealand (Recorded Music NZ)	19
South Africa (Springbok Radio)	8
Switzerland (Schweizer Hitparade)	7

Chart (1983)	Position
UK Singles (Official Charts Company)	7
US Billboard Hot 100	4
US Cash Box Top 100	8

== Certifications ==
Region	Certification	Certified units/sales
Australia (ARIA)	Gold	50,000^{^}
Canada (Music Canada)	Gold	50,000^{^}
Denmark (IFPI Danmark)	Platinum	90,000^{‡}
Germany (BVMI)	Platinum	600,000^{‡}
Italy (FIMI)	Gold	50,000^{‡}
New Zealand (RMNZ)	6× Platinum	180,000^{‡}
Spain (Promusicae)	Platinum	60,000^{‡}
United Kingdom (BPI)	3× Platinum	1,800,000^{‡}
United States (RIAA)	Platinum	1,000,000^{^}
^{^} Shipments figures based on certification alone.^{‡} Sales+streaming figures based on certification alone.

== Colin Hay versions ==
An acoustic version of the song was recorded for Colin Hay's eighth studio album Man @ Work, which was released in 2003.

In 2012, a new version of the song was produced by Hay, coinciding with the thirtieth anniversary of the original's release. Requested by Telstra for use in an Australian advertising campaign during the 2012 Summer Olympics period, the song was available through iTunes on 31 July 2012.

In the new version, Hay intentionally changed the flute part that caused the copyright lawsuit and the single cover showed an upside kookaburra bird.

In 2025, a version with re-recorded vocals by Hay was released titled "Down Under 2025", in collaboration with electronic DJ/producers Lizot and Kickbait.

=== Luude featuring Colin Hay ===
"Down Under"
- Digital download

Single by Luude featuring Colin Hay
- Released: 19 November 2021
- Genre: Drum and bass
- Length: 2:38
- Label: Sweat It Out
- Songwriters: Colin Hay; Ron Strykert
- Producer: Luude

Luude featuring Colin Hay singles chronology
"Wanna Stay" (2021)	"Down Under" (2021)	"Big City Life" (2022)

In 2021, Australian producer Luude (real name Christian Benson, from the Tasmanian electronic dance music duo Choomba), remixed "Down Under" as a drum and bass track, with Colin Hay re-recording the vocals for the track's release on the Sweat It Out record label. In January 2022, the drum and bass version of "Down Under" debuted at number 32 on the Official UK Singles Chart Top 40 and at number 48 in Australia. The single climbed into both countries' Top 10 a month later. In New Zealand, the record climbed to number one on the Official Singles Chart, and by 6 February 2022 had spent four weeks at number one. On 22 January 2022, the Luude version of "Down Under" was ranked at number 65 on the Triple J Hottest 100, 2021.

At the 2022 ARIA Music Awards, the song was nominated for Song of the Year, Best Dance/Electronic Release and Best Video and Luude was nominated for Michael Gudinski Breakthrough Artist.

It is also commonly associated with the Agartha Internet meme that started in the 2020s.

==== Charts ====
===== Weekly charts =====
Weekly chart performance for "Down Under" (Luude featuring Colin Hay version)
Chart (2021–2022)	Peak position
Australia (ARIA)	10
Austria (Ö3 Austria Top 40)	4
Belgium (Ultratop 50 Flanders)	25
Czech Republic Airplay (ČNS IFPI)	43
Czech Republic Singles Digital (ČNS IFPI)	38
Germany (GfK)	9
Global 200 (Billboard)	105
Hungary (Single Top 40)	40
Ireland (IRMA)	13
Lithuania (AGATA)	17
Netherlands (Single Tip)	7
New Zealand (Recorded Music NZ)	1
Poland Airplay (ZPAV)	49
Slovakia (Singles Digitál Top 100)	37
Slovakia Airplay (ČNS IFPI)	38
Switzerland (Schweizer Hitparade)	54
UK Singles (Official Charts)	5
UK Dance (Official Charts)	3
UK Independent (Official Charts)	1
US Hot Dance/Electronic Songs (Billboard)	20

===== Year-end charts =====
2022 year-end chart performance for "Down Under"
Chart (2022)	Position
Australia (ARIA)	28
Austria (Ö3 Austria Top 40)	17
Belgium (Ultratop 50 Flanders)	67
Germany (Official German Charts)	46
Lithuania (AGATA)	93
New Zealand (Recorded Music NZ)	4
UK Singles (OCC)	23
US Hot Dance/Electronic Songs (Billboard)	86

==== Certifications ====
Region	Certification	Certified units/sales
Australia (ARIA)	4× Platinum	280,000^{‡}
New Zealand (RMNZ)	5× Platinum	150,000^{‡}
United Kingdom (BPI)	2× Platinum	1,200,000^{‡}
^{‡} Sales+streaming figures based on certification alone.

== King Stingray version ==
"Down Under (Under One Sun)"

Single by King Stingray
- Released: 19 October 2022
- Length: 3:22
- Label: Cooking Vinyl Australia

King Stingray singles chronology
"Lupa" (2022)	"Down Under (Under One Sun)" (2022)	"Lookin' Out" (2023)

Australian rock band King Stingray released a version on 19 October 2022 and featured on the soundtrack of the Tourism Australia short film, Come and Say G'day. "Down Under" is the band's first release since their self-titled debut studio album, which was released in August 2022.

For their iteration, King Stingray had discussions with Colin Hay and recorded their version in a combination of English and their local Indigenous language, Yolŋu Matha, and comes with the subtitle "Under One Sun".

King Stingray performed the song with Colin Hay at the APRA Music Awards of 2023.

== See also ==
- List of number-one singles in Australia during the 1980s
- List of Billboard Hot 100 number ones of 1983
- List of Billboard Mainstream Rock number-one songs of the 1980s
- List of Cash Box Top 100 number-one singles of 1983
- List of number-one singles of 1982 (Canada)
- List of number-one singles of 1983 (Ireland)
- List of number-one singles from the 1980s (New Zealand)
- List of number-one singles of the 1980s (Switzerland)
- List of UK Singles Chart number ones of the 1980s
- List of UK Independent Singles Chart number ones of 2022
