= Men at Work =

Australian rock band

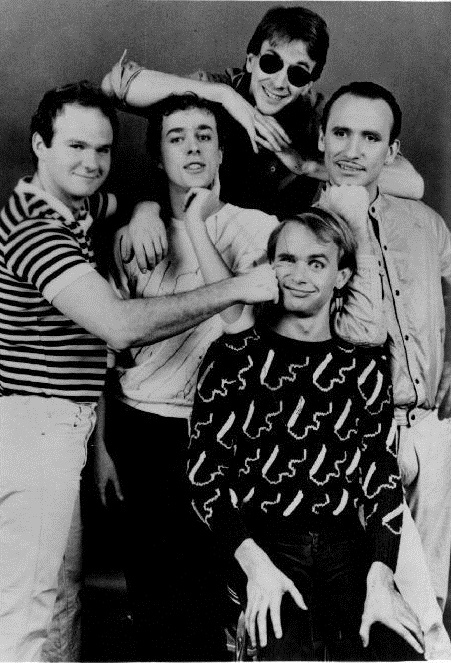
- Men at Work in 1983; Top: John Rees; middle: Jerry Speiser, Ron Strykert, Colin Hay; bottom: Greg Ham

Background information
- Origin: Melbourne, Victoria, Australia
- Genres: New wave; pop rock; reggae rock
- Years active: 1979–1986; 1996–2002; 2019–present (occasional reunions until 2012)
- Labels: Columbia; Epic
- Members: Colin Hay
- Past members: Greg Ham; Jerry Speiser; Ron Strykert; John Rees

Men at Work are an Australian rock band formed in Melbourne in 1979. They were best known for breakthrough hits such as "Down Under", "Who Can It Be Now?", "Be Good Johnny", "Overkill", "It's a Mistake" and "High Wire". The founding member and frontman is Colin Hay, who performs on lead vocals and guitar. After playing as an acoustic duo with Ron Strykert from 1978 to 1979, Hay formed the group with Strykert playing bass guitar and Jerry Speiser on drums. They were soon joined by Greg Ham on flute, saxophone and keyboards and John Rees on bass guitar, with Strykert switching back to lead guitar. The group were managed by Russell Depeller, a friend of Hay whom he met at La Trobe University. This line-up achieved national and international success during the early to mid-1980s.

In January 1983, they were the first Australian artists to have a simultaneous No. 1 album and No. 1 single on the United States Billboard charts: Business as Usual (released on 9 November 1981) and "Down Under" (1981), respectively. With the same works, they achieved the distinction of a simultaneous No. 1 album and No. 1 single on the Australian, New Zealand, and United Kingdom charts. Their second album Cargo (2 May 1983) was No. 1 in Australia, No. 2 in New Zealand, No. 3 in the US, and No. 8 in the UK. Their third album Two Hearts (3 April 1985) reached the top 20 in Australia and top 50 in the US.

They won the Grammy Award for Best New Artist in 1983, were inducted into the ARIA Hall of Fame in 1994 and have sold over 30 million albums worldwide. In May 2001, "Down Under" was listed at No. 4 on the APRA Top 30 Australian songs and Business as Usual appeared in the book 100 Best Australian Albums (October 2010).

In 1984, Speiser and Rees were asked to leave the group, leaving Hay, Ham and Strykert as a trio accompanied by session musicians. During the recording of the Two Hearts album, Strykert decided to leave. Soon after the 1985 release of Two Hearts, Ham left also, leaving Hay as the sole remaining member. Hay elected to work as a solo artist shortly thereafter in early 1986 and the Men at Work name was retired.

From 1996 until 2002, Hay and Ham revived the name and toured the world as Men at Work accompanied by new group members. On 19 April 2012, Ham was found dead at his home from an apparent heart attack.

In 2019, Hay once again revived the Men at Work moniker and began touring with a new lineup.

== History ==
=== Origins ===
The nucleus of Men at Work formed in Melbourne around June 1979 with Colin Hay on lead vocals and guitar, Ron Strykert on bass guitar and Jerry Speiser on drums. They were soon joined by Greg Ham on flute, sax and keyboards and then John Rees on bass guitar, with Strykert switching to lead guitar. Hay had immigrated to Australia in 1967 from Scotland with his family. In 1978, he had formed an acoustic duo with Strykert, which expanded by mid-1979 with the addition of Speiser. Around this time as a side project, keyboardist Greg Sneddon (ex-Alroy Band), a former bandmate of Jerry Speiser, together with Speiser, Hay and Strykert, performed and recorded the music to Riff Raff, a low budget stage musical, on which Sneddon had worked.

Hay asked Greg Ham to join the group, but Ham hesitated as he was finishing his music degree. Ultimately, he decided to join the band in October 1979. John Rees, a friend of Speiser, joined soon after. The name "Men At Work" was thrown into the hat by Hay, and was seconded by Ron Strykert, when a name was required to put on the blackboard outside The Cricketer's Arms Hotel, Richmond. The band built a "grass roots" reputation as a pub rock band. In 1980, the group issued their debut single, "Keypunch Operator" backed by "Down Under", with both tracks co-written by Hay and Strykert. It was self-financed and appeared on their own independent M. A. W. label. Australian musicologist Ian McFarlane felt the A-side was "a fast-paced country-styled rocker with a clean sound and quirky rhythm". Despite not appearing in the top 100 on the Australian Kent Music Report Singles Chart, by the end of that year the group had "grown in stature to become the most in-demand and highly paid, unsigned band of the year".

In July 1980, the band performed at the second "Rock Against Racism" concert at the Northcote Town Hall in Northcote, Melbourne, along with bands including the Aboriginal band No Fixed Address and Ross Hannaford's Lucky Dog, and feminist circus troupe Wimmin's Circus.

=== International success – Business as Usual and Cargo (1981–1983) ===
Early in 1981, Men at Work signed with CBS Records, the Australian branch of CBS Records International, (which became Sony Music) on the recommendation of Peter Karpin, the label's A&R person. The group's first single with CBS Records in Australia, "Who Can It Be Now?", was released in June 1981. It reached No. 2 and remained in the chart for 24 weeks. It had been produced by United States–based Peter McIan, who was also working on their debut album, Business as Usual.

McIan, together with the band, worked on the arrangements for all the songs that appeared on Business As Usual. Their next single was a re-arranged and "popified" version of "Down Under". It appeared in October that year and reached No. 1 in November, where it remained for six weeks. Business as Usual was also released in October and went to No. 1 on the Australian Kent Music Report Albums Chart, spending a total of nine weeks at the top spot. The Canberra Times' Garry Raffaele opined that it "generally stays at a high level, tight and jerky ... There is a delicacy about this music — and that is not a thing you can say about too many rock groups. The flute and reeds of Greg Ham do much to further that". McFarlane noted that "[a]side from the strength of the music, part of the album's appeal was its economy. The production sound was low-key, but clean and uncluttered. Indeed, the songs stood by themselves with little embellishment save for a bright, melodic, singalong quality".

By February the following year both "Down Under" and Business as Usual had reached No. 1 on the respective Official New Zealand Music Charts – the latter was the first Australian album to reach that peak in New Zealand. Despite its strong Australian and New Zealand showing, and having an American producer (McIan), Business as Usual was twice rejected by Columbia's US parent company. Thanks to the persistence of Russell Depeller and Karpin, the album was finally released in the US and the United Kingdom in April 1982 – six months after its Australian release. Their next single, "Be Good Johnny", was issued in Australia in April 1982 and reached No. 8 in Australia, and No. 3 in New Zealand.

Men at Work initially broke through to North American audiences in the western provinces of Canada with "Who Can It Be Now?" hitting the top 10 on radio stations in Winnipeg by May 1982. It peaked at No. 8 on the Canadian RPM Top Singles Chart in July. In August the group toured Canada and the United States to promote the album and related singles, supporting Fleetwood Mac. The band became more popular on Canadian radio in the following months and also started receiving top 40 US airplay by August. In October "Who Can It Be Now?" reached No. 1 on the US Billboard Hot 100, while Canada was one single ahead with "Down Under" topping the Canadian charts that same month. In the following month Business as Usual began a 15-week run at No. 1 on the Billboard 200.

While "Who Can It Be Now?" was still in the top ten in the US, "Down Under" was finally released in that market. It entered the US charts at No. 79 and ten weeks later, it was No. 1. By January 1983 Men at Work had the top album and single in both the US and the UK – never previously achieved by an Australian act. "Be Good Johnny" received moderate airplay in the US; it reached the top 20 in Canada.

"Down Under" gained international media exposure in September 1983 through television coverage of the Australian challenge for the America's Cup yacht trophy in September 1983 when it was adopted as the theme song by the crew of the successful Australia II.

The band released their second album, Cargo, in April 1983, which also peaked at No. 1 – for two weeks – on the Australian charts. In New Zealand it reached No. 2. It had been finished in mid-1982 with McIan producing again, but was held back due to the success of their debut album on the international market, where Business as Usual was still riding high. Cargo appeared at No. 3 on the Billboard 200, and No. 8 in the UK. The lead single, "Dr. Heckyll & Mr. Jive" was issued in Australia ahead of the album in October 1982 and reached No. 6, it peaked at No. 28 in the US the following year as the third single in that country. "Overkill", followed in March 1983 made it to No. 5 in Australia, and No. 3 in the US. "It's a Mistake" reached No. 6 in the US. The band toured the world extensively in 1983.

=== Two Hearts and break-up (1984–1986) ===
In 1984, long standing tensions between Hay and Speiser led to a split in the band. Both Rees and Speiser were told they were "not required", as Hay, Ham and Strykert used session musicians to record their third album, Two Hearts (23 April 1985). Hay later attributed the firing to a dispute over the band's manager, Russell Deppler, stating, "The rhythm section got sacked because they wanted to sack the manager, who was my friend." Speiser opined, "Russell was good for hustling gigs in Melbourne and Sydney but once the band became international and multi-million, the sheep farmer from Warrnambool had no idea." Studio musicians included Jeremy Alsop on bass guitar (ex-Ram Band, Pyramid, Broderick Smith Band); and Mark Kennedy on drums (Spectrum, Ayers Rock, Marcia Hines Band). Two Hearts was produced by Hay and Ham. It was a critical and commercial failure compared to their previous albums and only peaked at No. 16 in Australia, and No. 50 on the US chart. Strykert had left during its production.

Four tracks were released as singles, "Everything I Need" (May 1985), "Man with Two Hearts", "Maria" (August), and "Hard Luck Story" (October); only the lead single charted in Australia (No. 37) and the US (No. 47). The album relied heavily on drum machines and synthesisers, and reduced the presence of Ham's saxophone, giving it a different feel compared to its predecessors. Hay and Ham hired new bandmates, to tour in support of Two Hearts, with Alsop and Kennedy joined by James Black on guitar and keyboards (Mondo Rock, The Black Sorrows). Soon after a third guitarist, Colin Bayley (Mi-Sex), was added and Kennedy was replaced on drums by Chad Wackerman (Frank Zappa). Australian singers Kate Ceberano and Renée Geyer had also worked on the album and performed live as guest vocalists.

On 13 July 1985 Men at Work performed three tracks for the Oz for Africa concert (part of the global Live Aid program)—"Maria", "Overkill", and an unreleased one, "The Longest Night". They were broadcast in Australia (on both Seven Network and Nine Network) and on MTV in the US. "Maria" and "Overkill" were also broadcast by American Broadcasting Company (ABC) during their Live Aid telecast. Ham left during the band's time touring behind the album. The final Men at Work performances during 1985 had jazz saxophonist Paul Williamson (The Black Sorrows), replacing Ham. As of October 1985, the band's official line-up was a sextet of Hay, Alsop, Bayley, Black, Wackerman and Williamson (as pictured on the Australia-only single "Sail To You"), but by early 1986 the band was defunct. At that time, Hay started recording his first solo album, Looking for Jack (January 1987), which had Alsop and Wackerman as session musicians.

=== Partial reunion and second break-up (1996–2002) ===
By mid-1996, after a ten-year absence, Hay and Ham reformed Men at Work to tour South America. They had enjoyed strong fan support there during their earlier career and demands for a reunion had persisted. The 1996 line up had Stephen Hadley on bass guitar and backing vocals (ex-The Black Sorrows, Paul Kelly Band); Simon Hosford on guitar and backing vocals (Colin Hay backing band); and John Watson on drums (The Black Sorrows). The tour culminated in a performance in São Paulo, which was recorded for the Brazilian release of a live album, Brazil '96, in 1997, which was co-produced by Hay and Ham for Sony Music. It was re-released worldwide in 1998 as Brazil with a bonus track, "The Longest Night", the first new studio track since Two Hearts.

In 1997 drummer Tony Floyd replaced Watson but by 1998 the line-up was Hay, Ham, James Ryan (guitar, backing vocals), Rick Grossman (of the Hoodoo Gurus) on bass and Peter Maslen (ex–Boom Crash Opera) on drums. In 1999 Ryan, Grossman and Maslen were out and Hosford and Floyd were back in, along with bassist Stuart Speed. Rodrigo Aravena was brought in on bass in 2000, along with Heta Moses on drums. Moses was replaced by Warren Trout in 2001 as Stephen Hadley returned on bass.

The band toured Australia, South America, Europe and the US from 1998 to 2000. Men at Work performed "Down Under" at the closing ceremony of the 2000 Summer Olympics in Sydney, alongside Paul Hogan of "Crocodile" Dundee (1986).

One of their European tours for mid-2000 was cancelled and the group had disbanded once again by 2002, although Hay and Ham periodically reunited Men at Work with guest musicians (including an appearance in February 2009, when they performed "Down Under" as a duo at the Australia Unites Victorian Bushfire Appeal Telethon).

=== Copyright lawsuit and the death of Greg Ham ===
In February 2010, Larrikin Music Publishing won a case against Hay and Strykert, their record label (Sony BMG Music Entertainment) and music publishing company (EMI Songs Australia), arising from the uncredited appropriation of "Kookaburra", originally written in 1932 by Marion Sinclair, and for which Larrikin owned the publishing rights, as the flute line in the Men at Work song "Down Under". In early 2009 the Australian music-themed TV quiz, Spicks and Specks, had posed a question which suggested that "Down Under" contained elements of "Kookaburra".

Larrikin, then headed by Norman Lurie, filed suit after Larrikin was sold to another company and had demanded between 40% and 60% of the previous six years of earnings from the song. In February 2010, the judge ruled that "Down Under" did contain a flute riff based on "Kookaburra" but stipulated that neither was it necessarily the hook nor a substantial part of the hit song (Hay and Strykert had written the track years before the flute riff was added by Ham). In July 2010, a judge ruled that Larrikin should be paid 5% of past (since 2002) and future profits. Ham took the verdict particularly hard, feeling responsible for having performed the flute riff at the centre of the lawsuit and worried that he would only be remembered for copying someone else's music, resulting in depression and anxiety. Ham's body was found in his Carlton North home on 19 April 2012 after he suffered a fatal heart attack at the age of 58.

=== Post 2012 ===
In June 2019, Hay toured Europe with a group of Los Angeles–based session musicians under the name Men at Work, despite the band featuring no other original members of the band. The new line-up consisted of Hay (vocals, guitar), Scheila Gonzalez (saxophone, keyboards, vocals, flute), San Miguel Perez (guitar, backing vocals), Yosmel Montejo (bass, backing vocals), Jimmy Branly (drums, percussion) and Cecilia Noël (backing vocals).

In 2021 Australian producer Christian "Luude" Benson (from the Tasmanian tech house dance duo Choomba) remixed "Down Under" as a drum and bass track, which became popular online. Hay re-recorded the vocal for the track's official release, now credited to Luude featuring Colin Hay, with the record charting at number 32 on the UK Singles chart on 7 January 2022 and at number 48 in Australia (on the ARIA Top 50 Singles for the week of 10 January 2022).

== Other projects ==
Hay maintained a solo career and has played with Ringo Starr & His All-Starr Band in 2003, 2008 and ongoing since 2018. Strykert relocated to Hobart in 2009 from Los Angeles, and continued to play music and released his first solo album, Paradise, in September that year. He expressed resentment towards Hay, mainly over royalties, but was also arrested for an alleged death threat. Ham remained musically active and played saxophone with the Melbourne-based group The Nudist Funk Orchestra until his death. Rees was a music teacher in Melbourne and also played the violin and bass guitar for the band Beggs 2 Differ. Speiser played drums for the band The Afterburner.

== Awards and nominations ==
=== ARIA Music Awards ===
The ARIA Music Awards is an annual awards ceremony that recognises excellence, innovation, and achievement across all genres of Australian music. They commenced in 1987. Men at Work were inducted into the Hall of Fame in 1994.

Year	Nominee / work	Award	Result
1994	Men at Work	ARIA Hall of Fame	Inductee

=== Countdown Australian Music Awards ===
Countdown is an Australian pop music TV series that aired on national broadcaster ABC-TV from 1974 to 1987, it presented music awards from 1979 to 1987, initially in conjunction with magazine TV Week. The TV Week / Countdown Awards were a combination of popular-voted and peer-voted awards.

Year	Nominee / work	Award	Result
1981	"Down Under"	Best Australian Single	Nominated
1981	Business as Usual	Best Debut Album	Won
1981	"Who Can It Be Now?"	Best Debut Single	Won
1981	Themselves	Best New Talent	Won
1981	Themselves	Most Popular Group	Nominated
1982	Colin Hay (Men at Work)	Best Songwriter	Nominated
1982	Themselves	Most Popular Group	Nominated
1982	Themselves	Most Outstanding Achievement	Won
1983	Cargo	Best Australian Album	Nominated
1983	Themselves	Most Outstanding Achievement	Won
1983	Themselves	Most Popular Group	Nominated

=== Grammy Awards ===
Year	Nominee / work	Award	Result
1983	Men at Work	Best New Artist	Won

=== Other awards ===
In August 1983 they were given a Crystal Globe Award for $100 million worth of record business by their US label. That same year in Canada they were awarded a Juno Award for "International LP of the Year". Men at Work has sold over 30 million albums worldwide.

On 28 May 2001 "Down Under" was listed at No. 4 on the APRA Top 30 Australian songs. In October 2010, Business as Usual was listed in the book, 100 Best Australian Albums.

== Members ==
Current members

- Colin Hay – lead vocals, rhythm guitar (1978–1986, 1996–2002, 2019–present; occasional performances 2002–2012)
- Cecilia Noël – backing vocals, percussion (2019–present)
- Jimmy Branly – drums (2019–present)
- Yosmel Montejo – bass, backing vocals (2019–present)
- Rachel Mazer – saxophone, flute, keyboards, backing vocals (2025–present)
- Allen Hinds – lead guitar (2026–present)

Former members

- Ron Strykert – lead guitar, bass, backing and occasional lead vocals (1978–1985)
- Jerry Speiser – drums, percussion, backing vocals (1979–1984)
- Greg Ham – keyboards, saxophone, harmonica, flute, backing and occasional lead vocals (1979–1985, 1996–2002; occasional performances 2002–2012; died 2012)
- John Rees – bass, backing vocals (1980–1984)
- Jeremy Alsop – bass, backing vocals (1985–1986)
- James Black – guitar, keyboards, backing vocals (1985–1986)
- Colin Bayley – guitar, backing vocals (1985–1986)
- Chad Wackerman – drums, backing vocals (1985–1986)
- Paul Williamson – saxophone, keyboards, backing vocals (1985–1986)
- Scheila Gonzalez – saxophone, flute, keyboards, backing vocals (2019–2025)
- San Miguel Perez – lead guitar, backing vocals (2019–2026)

Former touring musicians

- Mark Kennedy – drums (1985)
- Simon Hosford – guitar, backing vocals (1996–1998, 1999–2001)
- Stephen Hadley – bass, backing vocals (1996–1998, 2001)
- John Watson – drums (1996–1997)
- Tony Floyd – drums (1997–1998, 1999–2000)
- Rick Grossman – bass, backing vocals (1998–1999)
- James Ryan – guitar, backing vocals (1998–1999)
- Peter Maslen – drums (1998–1999)
- Stuart Speed — bass, backing vocals (1998–1999)
- Rodrigo Aravena – bass, backing vocals (2000–2001)
- Heta Moses – drums (2000–2001)
- Warren Trout – drums (2001)

== Discography ==
- Business as Usual (1981)
- Cargo (1983)
- Two Hearts (1985)

== See also ==
- List of artists who have achieved simultaneous UK and US number-one hits
