= Colin Hay discography =

- Studio albums: 16
- Singles: 30
- Video albums: 2
- Music videos: 17

The discography of Colin Hay, a Scottish-born Australian singer, consists of sixteen studio albums, two video albums and twenty-nine singles (including five as a featured artist). Before his solo career commenced in 1986, Hay was the lead vocalist of the band Men at Work.

== Albums ==
=== Studio albums ===
Title	Details	Peak chart positions
Title	Details	AUS
Looking for Jack (as Colin James Hay)	Released: March 1987; Label: CBS (450355 1); Format: LP, Cassette, CD	58
Wayfaring Sons (as Colin Hay Band)	Released: April 1990; Label: MCA (256911-1); Format: LP, Cassette, CD	118
Peaks & Valleys	Released: February 1992; Label: EastWest (903176180-2); Format: CD	126
Topanga	Released: 1994; Label: Lazy Eye Records, Newmarket Music (NEW1063.2); Format: CD	200
Transcendental Highway	Released: February 1998; Label: Lazy Eye Records, Festival Records (D31831); Format: CD	184
Going Somewhere	Released: 2000; Label: Lazy Eye Records, Head Records (HEAD038); Format: CD	—
Company of Strangers	Released: 2002; Label: Lazy Eye Records; Format: CD	—
Man @ Work	Released: July 2003; Label: Lazy Eye Records (7 4365 2); Format: CD	—
Are You Lookin' at Me?	Released: April 2007; Label: Lazy Eye Records, Compass Records (7 4453 2); Format: CD	—
American Sunshine	Released: August 2009; Label: Lazy Eye Records, Compass Records (7 4512 2); Format: CD, DD	—
Gathering Mercury	Released: May 2011; Label: Lazy Eye Records, Compass Records (7 4551 2); Format: CD, DD	—
Next Year People	Released: 13 February 2015; Label: Lazy Eye Records, Compass Records (7 4641 2); Format: CD, DD, LP, streaming	—
Fierce Mercy	Released: March 2017; Label: Lazy Eye, Compass Records (7 4680 2); Format: CD, DD, LP, streaming	44
I Just Don't Know What to Do With Myself	Released: August 2021; Label: Lazy Eye, Compass Records, Sony (7 4781 1); Format: CD, DD, LP, streaming	132
Now and the Evermore	Released: 18 March 2022; Label: Song (19658706062); Format: CD, DD, LP, streaming	—
Man @ Work Volume 2	Released: 18 July 2025; Label: Compass Records; Format: CD digital, LP	—

== Singles ==
=== As lead artist ===
Year	Title	Peak chart positions			Album
Year	Title	AUS	CAN AC	US	Album
1987	"Hold Me"	40	—	99	Looking for Jack
1987	"Looking for Jack"	—	—	—	Looking for Jack
1987	"Can I Hold You?"	—	—	—	Looking for Jack
1990	"Into My Life"	117	—	—	Wayfaring Sons
1990	"Wayfaring Sons"	—	—	—	Wayfaring Sons
1990	"Storm in My Heart"	—	—	—	Wayfaring Sons
1995	"I Haven't Seen You in a Long Time"	—	49	—	Topanga
1997	"Don't Believe You Anymore"	—	—	—	Transcendental Highway
1998	"My Brilliant Feat"	—	—	—	Transcendental Highway
1998	"If I Go"	—	—	—	Transcendental Highway
1999	"Goodbye My Red Rose"	—	—	—	Transcendental Highway
1999	"Misty Bay" (with Cecilia Noël)	—	—	—	Bongoland
2011	"Far from Home"	—	—	—	Gathering Mercury
2011	"Send Somebody"	—	—	—	Gathering Mercury
2012	"Down Under 2012"	—	—	—	Non-album single
2014	"Trying to Get to You"	—	—	—	Next Year People
2016	"Mr. Grogan"	—	—	—	Next Year People
2016	"A Thousand Million Reasons"	—	—	—	Fierce Mercy
2017	"Come Tumbling Down"	—	—	—	Fierce Mercy
2017	"Secret Love"	—	—	—	Fierce Mercy
2017	"Precious Packages - A Plena for Puerto Rico"	—	—	—	non-album
2018	"You Saved Me from Myself"	—	—	—	The Resident: Season 2 (soundtrack)
2020	"Now and the Evermore" (acoustic version)	—	—	—	non-album
2021	"I Just Don't Know What to Do with Myself"	—	—	—	I Just Don't Know What to Do with Myself
2021	"Oh La La"	—	—	—	I Just Don't Know What to Do with Myself
2025	"Down Under 2025" (with Lizot and Kickbait)	—	—	—	non-album

=== As featured artist ===
Year	Title	Peak chart positions			Certifications	Album
Year	Title	AUS	NZ	UK	Certifications	Album
1997	"Overkill" (Lazlo Bane featuring Colin Hay)	—	—	—		11 Transistor
2016	"Un Poquito de Amor Everyday (Everybody Needs Some Love Today)" (San Miguel featuring Colin Hay)	—	—	—		Un Poquito de Amor Everyday
2017	"Now the Time Has Come" (with Ringo Starr, and various artists)	—	—	—		Non-album single
2021	"Overkill" (DJ Chris All featuring Colin Hay)	—	—	—		TBA
2021	"Down Under" (Luude featuring Colin Hay)	10	1	5	ARIA: 4× Platinum; BPI: Platinum	Non-album single
2022	"Colin" (Lime Cordiale featuring Colin Hay)	—	—	—		Enough of the Sweet Talk

=== Other appearances ===
Year	Title	Album
1996	"The Flying Song"	Gold Diggers: The Secret of Bear Mountain
2015	"I'll Never Fall in Love Again" (with Alison Brown)	The Songs of the Banjo
2015	"Are We There Yet?" (with Renee and Friends)	Simpatico
2016	"Who Can It Be Now?" (with Barenaked Ladies)	BNL Rocks Red Rocks
2019	"Next Year People" (with Sara Storer)	Raindance
2019	"What's My Name" (with Ringo Starr)	What's My Name
2019	"I Just Don't Think I'll Ever Get Over You" (with (Gabriel Mann)	A Million Little Things (soundtrack)
2021	"First Class Man" (with Imogen Clarke)	Bastards
2021	"You've Got a Friend" (with Lazlo Bane and Louise Goffin)	Someday We'll Be Together
2025	"Caledonia" (with Swanee)	Believe

== Videography ==
=== Video albums ===
Title	Details
Live at the Continental	Released: 2002; Label: Lazy Eye Records; Format: VHS; Recorded in 2000
Live at the Corner	Released: 2010; Label: Compass Records (7 4546 9); Format: DVD; Recorded in 2007 at The Corner hotel in Melbourne, Australia.

=== Music videos ===
Year	Title	Album
1986	"Looking for Jack"	Looking for Jack
1986	"Hold Me"	Looking for Jack
1986	"Can I Hold You?"	Looking for Jack
1990	"Into My Life"	Wayfaring Sons
1990	"Help Me"	Wayfaring Sons
1998	"Don't Believe You Anymore"	Trascendental Highway
2007	"Are You Lookin' at Me?"	Are You Lookin' at Me?
2011	"Send Somebody"	Gathering Mercury
2011	"Far from Home"	Gathering Mercury
2016	"Mr. Grogan"	Next Year People
2017	"Come Tumblin' Down"	Fierce Mercy
2017	"Secret Love"	Fierce Mercy
2017	"A Thousand Million Reasons"	Fierce Mercy
2020	"Precious Packages - A Plena for Puerto Rico"	non-album
2020	"Now and the Evermore" (acoustic version)	non-album
2022	"Love Is Everywhere"	Now and the Evermore
2024	"We the People" (with Derrick "Solpowa" Rice)	Man @ Work Volume 2

== See also ==
- Men at Work
- Ringo Starr & His All-Starr Band
