= Center of Six =

Studio album by Josh Clayton-Felt and Friends
- Released: 6 May 2003
- Recorded: 1996–1997, 2001, 2002
- Genre: Pop rock
- Label: Talking Cloud Records
- Producer: Josh Clayton-Felt, Patrick Leonard, Tony Phillips, Chad Fischer, Kevin Hunter, R. Walt Vincent, Benjamin Dowling, Sage, Colin Hay, Sean Duane

Josh Clayton-Felt and Friends chronology
Spirit Touches Ground (2002)	Center of Six (2003)	Spirit Shines Through (2013)

Center of Six is a second posthumous release of music by singer-songwriter Josh Clayton-Felt. It features previously unreleased songs by Josh Clayton-Felt and songs by Josh's friends written and recorded for him after his death.

== Recording ==
The first part of the album features songs composed by Josh Clayton-Felt in the winter of 1996–97 in Kinsale, Ireland and recorded by him with his backing band in Los Angeles.

The second part consist of tribute songs written for Josh. The musicians that participated include Raina Lee Scott, who have previously added additional vocals to Spirit Touches Ground, former lead singer of Men at Work Colin Hay, Kevin Hunter of the former San Francisco band Wire Train, the Los Angeles-based musicians Jami Lula Washington and Sage, musician and actor Andras Jones, the Irish musician and composer Linda Buckley, Los Angeles musician Renee Stahl and actress Renee Faia.

== Music and lyrics ==
Josh Clayton-Felt's songs on the album are in search of the self and the journey inward. The title song refers to finding a center in the six Native American directions: North, South, East, West, Up (All Father/Heavens), and Down (Grandmother Earth), and speaks of memory of "when the wind blew... when the sky knew.... when the earth told me not to forget" while on the song "Sacred Mountain" Josh imagines his future. The songs “Forever Self”, “Two Sides”, and “Intermission” head into the direction of Clayton-Felt’s funk-pop interests.

== Release ==
Center of Six was originally intended to be the title of the follow-up record to Josh's debut solo album Inarticulate Nature Boy but during the final stages of work on the album that eventually was released as Spirit Touches Ground both the title Center of Six and the song had been set aside by Josh for a possible future.

After the release of Spirit Touches Ground more tracks by Josh Clayton-Felt were prepared for release. The co-executive producer for the album as well as producer of several tracks was Chad Fischer who previously played with Josh Clayton-Felt in School of Fish and did mixing of Spirit Touches Ground album.

The album was released only on CD with proceeds from sales donated to Descendants of the Earth, a non-profit Native American organization to which Clayton-Felt was dedicated.

Several songs by Josh's friends that were included on the album have been previously released. The song "Complicated O" by andras Jones have been released on his EP Complicated '00 in 2001. The song "Dear J" by Colin Hay was previously released on his 2002 studio album Company of Strangers.

== Reception ==
Patrick Schabe in the PopMatters review wrote that "Center of Six is what a true tribute album really should be all about: celebrating the life of the artist" with "a small but tasty dose of Josh’s own work" and "some wonderfully touching, almost gut-wrenching, eulogies to the man himself".

== Track listing ==
No.	Title	Performer	Writer	Producer	Length
1.	"Center of Six"	Josh Clayton-Felt	Josh Clayton-Felt	Patrick Leonard	4:35
2.	"Flute"	Josh Clayton-Felt	Clayton-Felt	Josh Clayton-Felt and Tony Phillips	0:42
3.	"Forever Self"	Josh Clayton-Felt	Clayton-Felt	Clayton-Felt and Phillips	3:58
4.	"Two Sides"	Josh Clayton-Felt	Clayton-Felt	Clayton-Felt and Phillips	4:23
5.	"Sacred Mountain"	Josh Clayton-Felt	Clayton-Felt	Clayton-Felt and Phillips	4:48
6.	"Intermission"	Josh Clayton-Felt	Clayton-Felt	Clayton-Felt and Phillips	2:48
7.	"You Have Been Freed"	Raina Lee Scott	Raina Lee Scott	Chad Fischer	3:27
8.	"Taking You with Me"	Kevin Hunter	Kevin Hunter	Kevin Hunter	4:35
9.	"Complicated O"	Andras Jones	Andras Jones	Fischer and R. Walt Vincent	4:26
10.	"Waving"	Jami Lula	Jami Lula	Benjamin Dowling	4:29
11.	"Only Love"	Renee Faia and Renee Stahl	Renee Faia and Renee Stahl	Fischer	4:22
12.	"Monday Afternoon"	Sage	Sage	Fischer and Sage	4:32
13.	"Dear J"	Colin Hay	Colin Hay	Colin Hay	2:42
14.	"Anam Cara"	Linda Buckley	Linda Buckley	Linda Buckley	3:40
15.	"Sense of Humor"	Josh Clayton-Felt	Clayton-Felt	Clayton-Felt	0:33

== Personnel ==
=== Josh Clayton-Felt ===
- Josh Clayton-Felt – vocals, guitar, flute
- Paul Bunshell – bass
- Davey Faragher – bass
- Patrick Leonard – keyboards, producer
- Brian McLeod – drums
- Pete Maloney – drums
- DC Collard – organ
- Martin Tillman – cello
- Louise Goffin – keyboards
- Patrick Warren – chamberlin
- Tony Phillips – producer
- Billy Preston – organ

=== Friends ===
- Chad Fischer – keyboards, drums, percussion, piano, vocals, programming, producer, mixing
- Raina Lee Scott – guitar, vocals
- Kevin Hunter – performer, producer
- Andras Jones – guitar, vocals
- R. Walt Vincent – piano, bass, producer
- Jami Lula – guitar, vocals
- Jeffrey Dean – bass
- Benjamin Dowling – loops, producer
- Renee Faia – vocals
- Renee Stahl – vocals
- Gregg Sarfaty – guitar
- Sage – vocals, bass, guitar, strings
- Vinnie Colaiuta – drums
- Alex Alessandroni Jr – piano, keyboards
- Colin Hay – guitar, vocals, producer
- Linda Buckley – performer
- Mel Mercier – performer
- Sean Duane – producer
