= Spirit Touches Ground =

Studio album by Josh Clayton-Felt
- Released: February 12, 2002
- Genre: Pop rock
- Length: 59:37
- Label: DreamWorks
- Producer: Josh Clayton-Felt

Josh Clayton-Felt chronology
Beautiful Nowhere (1999)	Spirit Touches Ground (2002)	Center of Six (2003)

Spirit Touches Ground is the third studio album by singer-songwriter Josh Clayton-Felt, which was released through DreamWorks Records in 2002, two years after his death from cancer.

== Background and recording ==
After the success of his first album, 1996's Inarticulate Nature Boy, Clayton-Felt prepared to release a new batch of songs under the title Center of Six. Record label A&M suspended all contracts and placed a freeze on recordings during their buyout by Universal Records, preventing the release of Center of Six; subsequently, over 200 artists were dropped during the post-acquisition "cleaning house" process, including Clayton-Felt. Further, the new owners refused to allow Clayton-Felt to use or buy back his previously recorded material, and he was contractually prevented from re-recording it for five years, though he continued working on the material.

Over the years following the change of ownership, Clayton-Felt developed new material, self-releasing two recordings – ...Felt Like Making a Live Record and Beautiful Nowhere; whilst also continuing to lobby Universal to release its claim on his earlier work.

Clayton-Felt finished the final mixing and production of Spirit Touches Ground in early December 1999, just one week before being hospitalized with what turned out to be choriocarcinoma (a rare form of testicular cancer with the worst prognosis of all germ-cell cancers); he died at the age of 32 less than a month later. Universal relinquished its claim on his unreleased music while Clayton-Felt was hospitalized in a coma, his family whispering the long-sought news into his ear. Led by Laura Baker, Clayton-Felt's sister, a network of friends and fans lobbied for the promotion and distribution of this long-delayed material, eventually organizing for the album completed shortly before his death to be released under the DreamWorks label in 2002.

Other unreleased material including the song "Center of Six" itself was released by the Talking Clouds Records label in 2003 on the album Center of Six.

== Release and reception ==
Professional ratings
Review scores
Source	Rating
AllMusic	4.5/5 stars
Entertainment Weekly	B+
PopMatters	Favorable
The Wichita Eagle	4.5/5 stars

Spirit Touches Ground received largely positive reviews upon its release on February 12, 2002. Kevin Bronson of the Los Angeles Times wrote the album "brims with grand metaphor and unrelenting hope, the crisp, tuneful work of a singer-songwriter in full bloom."

Randy Krbechek of CD Shakedown wrote, "Despite the turmoil in the background, Spirit Touches Ground, has an uplifting feel."

Vanessa Bormann of Ink 19 wrote:

After his early band, School Of Fish, began to drift apart and he made the decision to go solo, Josh Clayton-Felt was born. He released three discs, all of them increasingly better written, deeper, more touching. But in a rightful crescendo, it is in Josh's case, that the best has been saved for last.

Bradley Torreano of AllMusic gave the album four and a half out of five stars and noted that Clayton-Felt had substantial talent and the potential for a successful career, writing:

If this album is any indication, Clayton-Felt was on his way to becoming the lighthearted alternative to Jeff Buckley. That may seem like an obvious comparison, but the parallels between the two musicians are eerie when viewed side by side. They were both respected guitarists who used their smooth voices and songwriting skills to make some of the best blue-eyed soul of the '90s. And both musicians were sadly taken from the world far too early in their careers, something that has halted any mainstream exposure Clayton-Felt could have received.

Rob Brunner of Entertainment Weekly gave the album a B+ and also noted that his death was a loss to the music world, writing: "Like similarly minded L.A. smart-pop artists Aimee Mann and Jason Falkner, Clayton-Felt writes modest songs that take time to reveal their true depth. It's a real loss that the singer won't get the same chance himself."

Lisa Hummel of Mode Weekly gave an even more favorable review writing:

More than posthumous blabber, the raves being lauded upon Spirit are entirely warranted. Lyrically strong and fundamentally sound, the 14-track disc is at times sweet and spiritual; at others, it is rockin’ and loud. From the first cut, the catchy current single “Building Atlantis” (I hold your hand/As we disappear into the sand/While the rest of the world was drowning around us/Ah, we were building Atlantis/Of all the pieces I’ve lost/Only you fit/Cause we were building Atlantis”), to the last, "Dragon Fly'"(If you want to get through/To the other side/Let the dragonfly/Come and give you a ride/Every day you’re born/And every night you die), Spirit journeys on with a beatnik-folk, soulful feel.

Patrick Schabe of PopMatters gave the album a glowing review, noting influence from some very successful artists:

Spirit Touches Ground reveals elements of John Lennon, Stevie Wonder, Jeff Buckley, and a slew of musical influences, yet always feels like a personal extension of Josh himself rather than imitation. And, as so many have noted in the past, there's his voice. Ever since his days in School of Fish, listeners and critics have noted that Clayton-Felt’s voice possessed a quality of clarity, emotion, and a beauty that helped drive his songs. Personal and intimate, his voice soars through the fourteen tracks of Spirit Touches Ground in a graceful, if unintentional, swan song.

Fufkin.com writer Gary Glauber also gave the album a glowing review, writing "the record stands as an ultimate testament to how much his talents will be missed." He stated the most obvious musical comparison may be Jeff Buckley, though he agreed that Clayton-Felt sounded much lighter. Glauber goes on to write about each of the tracks and what he feels are their strong points before arriving at the following conclusion:

This is gentle intimate pop with a life force and musical intelligence behind it that makes one smile. Let Spirit Touches Ground touch you with its hooks and friendly funky fare, its grooves and hushed ballads, its beauty and fanciful turns and rampant optimism and sweet melodies. Clayton-Felt’s vision, now finally delivered as he wanted it, is a rewarding journey I recommend to one and all. I’m sure Josh Clayton-Felt would agree with my closing dictum: Listen often and enjoy!

== Use in other media ==
The song "Backwards World" was played on Felicity episode "Time Will Tell".

== Track listing ==
All the tracks on the album were written by Josh Clayton-Felt.

No.	Title	Length
1.	"Building Atlantis"	3:35
2.	"Diamond in Your Heart"	3:56
3.	"Backwards World"	4:20
4.	"Invisible Tree"	3:37
5.	"Love Sweet Love"	4:21
6.	"Too Cool for This World"	4:12
7.	"Kid on the Train"	4:58
8.	"Half Life"	4:06
9.	"Deer in the Headlights"	4:12
10.	"Spirit Touches Ground"	4:07
11.	"Night of a Thousand Girls"	3:53
12.	"Already Gone"	4:13
13.	"Waiting to Be"	3:23
14.	"Dragon Fly"	6:44

== Personnel ==
The album's credits and personnel can be obtained from AllMusic.

- Josh Clayton-Felt - vocals, guitar, engineer, producer
- Paul Bushnell - bass guitar
- Davey Faragher - bass guitar
- Jay Bellerose - drums
- Chad Fischer - drums, percussion, mixing
- Brian McCloud - drums
- Billy Goodrum - keyboard
- Martin Tillman - cello
- Raina Lee Scott - additional vocals
- Lynda Buckley - additional vocals
