= Josh Clayton-Felt =

American singer-songwriter

Background information
- Born: Josh Clayton; May 18, 1967; Boston, Massachusetts
- Died: January 19, 2000 (aged 32) Los Angeles, California
- Genres: Alternative rock
- Occupations: Musician, producer, songwriter
- Instruments: Vocals, guitar, bass, drums, keyboard
- Years active: 1987–2000
- Labels: Capitol, A&M, DreamWorks, Talking Cloud
- Formerly of: School of Fish
- Website: www.joshclayton.com

Josh Clayton-Felt (May 18, 1967 – January 19, 2000) was an American singer-songwriter and multi-instrumentalist. He co-founded the alternative rock band School of Fish and later embarked on a solo career.

== Biography ==
=== Early years ===
Clayton-Felt was one of two children along with his sister Laura born to Jewish parents Marilyn (1938–2006), a playwright and John J. Clayton, a writer. His parents later divorced and his mother would eventually remarry Henry Felt, a folk musician who exposed Clayton-Felt to the works of Lead Belly, Woody Guthrie, and Pete Seeger. At the age of 17, Clayton-Felt visited Israel, writing about his experiences. He grew up outside of Boston, Massachusetts, and attended high school at the Cambridge School of Weston. He later enrolled at Brown University.

=== School of Fish ===
Clayton-Felt moved to Los Angeles after leaving Brown to form The Boon with fellow CSW-alumnus Andras Jones. During this time he worked for acclaimed comedy director Robert B. Weide in 1987 as an informal office assistant during the production of Swear to Tell the Truth. He also worked at the Tower Records store on Sunset Boulevard in West Hollywood.

Josh Clayton-Felt and Michael Ward founded the band School of Fish that went on to musical success in America in the late 1980s through the mid-1990s.

=== Solo career ===
After the breakup of School of Fish, Clayton-Felt released an album independently in 1994, and landed a deal with A&M Records in 1996. His album, Inarticulate Nature Boy, was released in February 1996. It scored airplay on college radio, with the track "Window" reaching No. 49 on Radio & Records' Alternative chart, and led to tours with Tori Amos and Del Amitri. The record did not sell well and Clayton-Felt was dropped; he had been writing a follow-up record, to be titled Center of Six, which he continued to work on in 1998 and 1999 with session drummer Steve Scully.

=== Death ===
In December 1999, while still writing for the album, Clayton-Felt was diagnosed with choriocarcinoma, a rare form of a particularly aggressive testicular cancer with the worst prognosis of all germ-cell cancers. He died a month later at the age of 32. Robert B. Weide delivered the eulogy at Clayton-Felt's funeral, in early 2000.

=== Aftermath ===
In 2002, DreamWorks Records released a collection of songs from the unfinished Center of Six sessions under the name Spirit Touches Ground. Talking Cloud Records released an album of additional unreleased material under the Center of Six name (including the title track) in 2003.

== Discography ==
Studio albums

Year	Album details
1996	Inarticulate Nature Boy: Released: March 19, 1996; Label: A&M Records
1999	Beautiful Nowhere: Released: October 18, 1999; Label: Talking Cloud Records
2002	Spirit Touches Ground: Released: February 12, 2002; Label: DreamWorks Records
2003	Center of Six (Josh Clayton-Felt & Friends): Released: May 6, 2003; Label: Talking Cloud Records

Live albums

Year	Album details
1997	...Felt Like Making a Live Record: Released: 1997; Label: Self-released

EPs

Year	Album details
2013	The Spirit Shines Through (Various Artists): Released: 2013; Label: Talking Cloud Records

Promotional singles

Year	Single	Album
1995	"Soon Enough"	Inarticulate Nature Boy
1995	"Window"	Inarticulate Nature Boy
2002	"Building Atlantis"	Spirit Touches Ground

=== With School of Fish ===
Year	Album details
1991	School of Fish: Released: April 1, 1991; Label: Capitol
1993	Human Cannonball: Released: 1993; Label: Capitol

=== With The Boon ===
Year	Album details
1988	The Boon: Released: May 5, 1988; Label: Self-released

=== As composer or session musician ===
Year	Subject	Collaborator	Comment
1996	"Barely Dressed" / "Starfish Girl"	Twig	drums
1997	11 Transistor	Lazlo Bane	co-writer of the song "Prada Wallet"
1998	Spirit	Jewel	electric guitar
2000	Haunted	Poe	co-writer of the song "5&½ Minute Hallway"
