= John J. Clayton =

American novelist

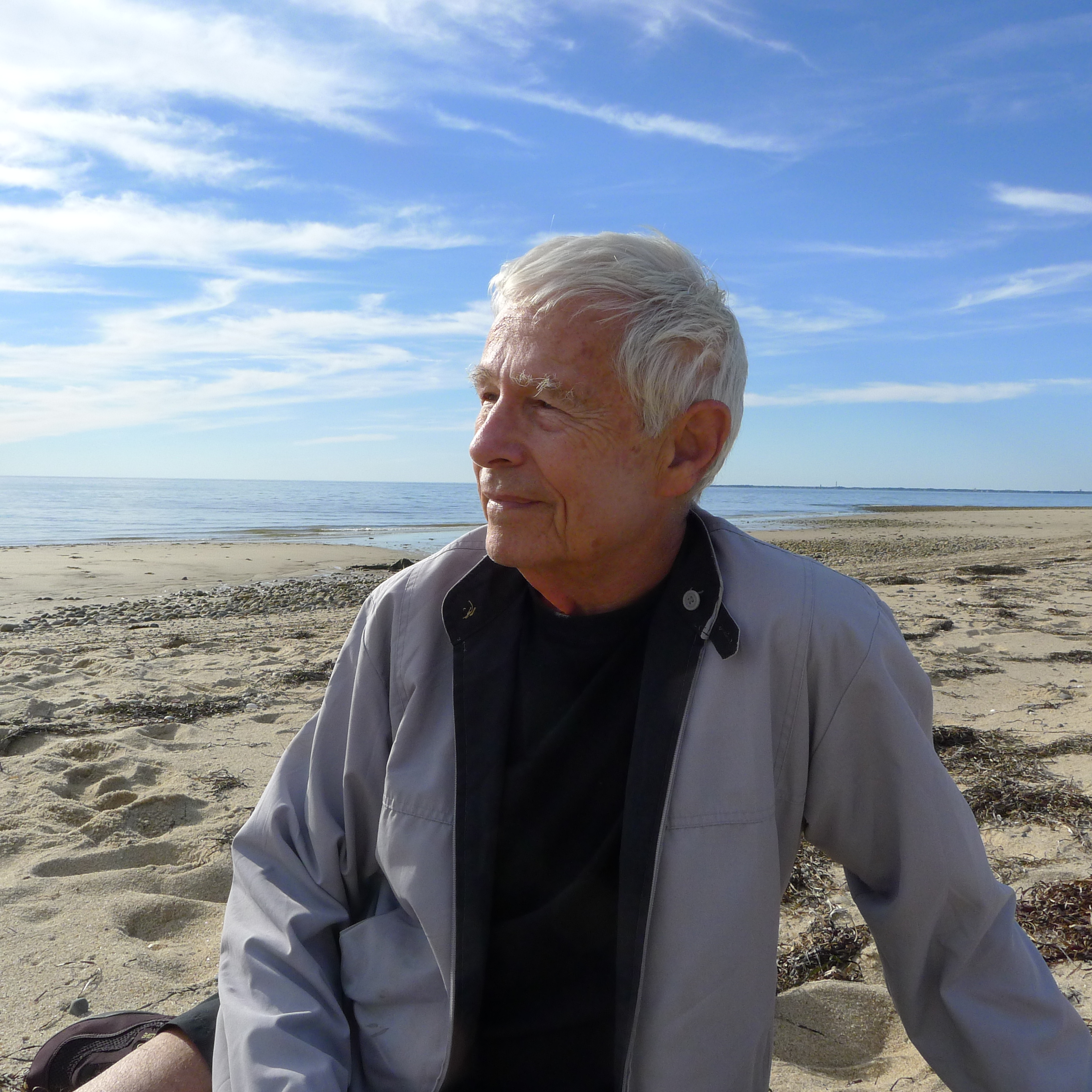
- Born: John Jacob Clayton; January 5, 1935 (age 91); New York City, U.S.
- Education: Columbia University (BA); New York University (MA); Indiana University Bloomington (PhD)
- Occupation: Writer
- Writing career
- Period: 1969-present
- Genre: Literary fiction

John Jacob Clayton (born January 5, 1935) is an American fiction writer, teacher, and editor. He has published four novels including Mitzvah Man (Texas Tech University Press), and Kuperman's Fire (Permanent Press), as well as five collections of short fiction, including Minyan: Ten Interwoven Stories (Paragon House) and Many Seconds into the Future (Texas Tech University Press). He was editor for the Heath Introduction to Fiction, a college anthology published in six editions from 1977 to 1999. In 2020 he published the non-fiction memoir Parkinson's Blues: Stories of My Life.

== Life ==
Clayton was born and raised in Manhattan, the only child of Jewish parents Charles Clayton, born Charles Cohen, and Leah Kaufman. His father, born in Montreal, was the son of immigrants from Odesa, who settled in Chicago. His mother, born as Leibe Barlok in Orhei, Bessarabia, immigrated to the U.S. in 1906, and her family settled in Rochester, New York. Clayton graduated from Columbia University with a B.A., New York University with an M.A. and Indiana University Bloomington with a PhD. His doctoral thesis Saul Bellow: In Defense of Man, published by University of Indiana Press in 1968 was one of the first books of criticism of Bellow's work. In the early 1960s Clayton taught at the University of Victoria, British Columbia, then in Germany for the University of Maryland in Europe. From 1964-1969 he lived in Brookline, Massachusetts, and taught at Boston University. In Fall 1969 he arrived at the University of Massachusetts Amherst, where as professor he taught American and British modern literature and creative writing for over thirty years.

== Literature ==
Clayton's early fiction rendered family life, separation, divorce, and childrearing and their attendant tensions, heartbreak, and growth. It also dealt with disillusionment with political involvement as in his O.Henry prize-winning story "Cambridge is Sinking". Since the early 1990s Clayton's novels and short stories have explored the universal themes of loss and spiritual redemption, acceptance, fading ideals, as well as with contemporary struggles of Jewish life and family. In 2016 Richard L. Rubenstein wrote of Clayton's collection of linked short stories: "If I were asked whether there is one single book I would recommend to anyone interested in learning about the world of contemporary American Jews, I would unhesitatingly recommend John J. Clayton's Minyan." Of the novel Kuperman's Fire Thane Rosenbaum wrote: "Clayton is a masterful observer of the modern world, with all its fears and neuroses—the threats that plague us from afar and from within, and the corruptions that contaminate not only our institutions, but also our spirits."

Clayton's fiction, literary criticism, memoir and journalism have appeared in a wide range of literary and popular magazines and newspapers including: Virginia Quarterly Review, AGNI (magazine), The Sewanee Review, The Georgia Review, TriQuarterly, The Missouri Review, Michigan Quarterly Review, Denver Quarterly, The Antioch Review, Fiction (magazine), Witness (magazine), Playboy, Chronicle of Higher Education and The Washington Post magazine. Beginning in 2003 Commentary magazine has published over twenty of Clayton's stories and memoir pieces

== Personal life ==
Clayton married in 1956 and had two children, Laura and Josh Clayton-Felt (1967-2000), a singer-songwriter who performed lead vocals and guitar for School of Fish. Clayton had two subsequent marriages, and two more sons. Clayton was diagnosed with Parkinson's disease in 2016.

== Works ==
Novels

- Mitzvah Man Texas Tech University Press, 2011.
- Kuperman's Fire Permanent Press, 2007; Blackstone Audio, 2007.
- The Man I Never Wanted to Be Permanent Press, 1998.
- What Are Friends For? Little, Brown and Company, Boston, 1979.

Short story collections

- Minyan: Ten Interwoven Stories Paragon House, 2016.
- Many Seconds into the Future Texas Tech University Press, 2014.
- Wrestling with Angels: New and Collected Stories Toby Press, subsidiary of Koren Publishers Jerusalem, September 2007, and Amazon Publishing, 2011.
- Radiance: Ten Stories Ohio State University Press, 1998.
- Bodies of the Rich University of Illinois Press, 1984.

Criticism and anthology

- Gestures of Healing: Anxiety and the Modern Novel University of Massachusetts Press, 1991.
- Saul Bellow: In Defense of Man University of Indiana Press, 1968; Second edition, revised, 1979.
- Heath Introduction to Fiction D. C. Heath and Company, Six editions 1977-1999.

Non-fiction

- Parkinson's Blues: Stories of My Life Paragon House, 2020
