= Beautiful Nowhere =

Studio album by Josh Clayton-Felt
- Released: 1999
- Recorded: 1993–94
- Genre: Pop rock
- Length: 53:40
- Label: Talking Could Records
- Producer: Josh Clayton-Felt

Josh Clayton-Felt chronology
...Felt Like Making a Live Record (1997)	Beautiful Nowhere (1999)	Spirit Touches Ground (2002)

Beautiful Nowhere is the second studio album by singer-songwriter Josh Clayton-Felt, though it was marketed and released under his birth name Josh Clayton.

== Background and recording ==
After the success of his first album, 1996's Inarticulate Nature Boy, Clayton-Felt prepared to release a new batch of songs under the title Center of Six. However, A&M Records suspended all contracts and placed a freeze on recordings during their buyout by Universal Records, preventing the release of Center of Six. While lobbying Universal Records to release its claim on the songs from the Center of Six sessions, Clayton-Felt continued to write and record a new batch of songs that were ultimately self-released under the title Beautiful Nowhere.

== Track listing ==
All tracks written and played by Josh Clayton-Felt.

No.	Title	Length
1.	"Painted Birds"	5:01
2.	"Right on Time"	4:51
3.	"Writing on a Candle"	4:59
4.	"Disappearing in New York"	4:16
5.	"Down the Same Steps"	4:28
6.	"Over My Shoulder"	3:59
7.	"Beautiful Nowhere"	4:35
8.	"Only Weakness"	3:42
9.	"Invisible World"	5:22
10.	"Superficial Brother"	5:24
11.	"Behind the Wall"	3:31
12.	"Pigeon"	4:08
13.	"Walk on the Water"	4:23

== Production ==
The album's credits can be obtained from the liner notes.

- Produced by Josh Clayon-Felt.
- Mastered by Sean Nova.
- Design by Larimie Garcia and Michelle Horie for Gig Design.
- Photography by Clayon-Felt, Garcia, and Hroie.
