= ...Felt Like Making a Live Record =

Live album by Josh Clayton-Felt
- Released: 1997
- Recorded: October–November 1996
- Genre: Pop rock

Josh Clayton-Felt chronology
Inarticulate Nature Boy (1996)	...Felt Like Making a Live Record (1997)	Beautiful Nowhere (1999)

...Felt Like Making a Live Record is a live album released by singer-songwriter Josh Clayton-Felt.

== Overview ==
The album was recorded during a tour in support of the Josh Clayton-Felt's debut solo album Inarticulate Nature Boy. The album also features covers and a previously unreleased song.

== Track listing ==
All songs by Josh Clayton-Felt except where noted.

No.	Title	Writer(s)	Length
1.	"Doubt"
2.	"What Do I Know"
3.	"Waiting"
4.	"Dead American"
5.	"Paint the Tree Green"
6.	"That's Alright" (Elvis Presley cover)	Arthur Crudup
7.	"Helpless"
8.	"Brick House" (Commodores cover)	Lionel Richie, Milan Williams, Walter Orange, Ronald La Pread, Thomas McClary, William King
9.	"Meet Me (The Get Me Some Blues)" (previously unreleased)
10.	"Soon Enough"
11.	"3 Strange Days" (from School of Fish)	Clayton-Felt / Michael Ward
12.	"Window"
