= American Sunshine =

Studio album by Colin Hay
- Released: 18 August 2009
- Genre: Rock, country rock, blues rock
- Label: Compass, Lazy Eye
- Producer: Colin Hay

Colin Hay chronology
Are You Lookin' at Me? (2007)	American Sunshine (2009)	Gathering Mercury (2011)

American Sunshine is the tenth studio album by Scottish-born Australian-based singer Colin Hay, released on 18 August 2009.

As with all of Colin Hay's music, American Sunshine contains largely personal songs; for example, "There's Water Over You" describes Hay's relationship with his parents. Unlike Going Somewhere, the tracks of American Sunshine are backed by Hay's band. This move away from minimalist, acoustic music is something Colin Hay established with his previous album, Man @ Work. However, Hay performs a great many of these tracks solo at his live appearances.

== Reception ==
Professional ratings
Review scores
Source	Rating
Allmusic	3.5/5 stars
Popmatters	6/10 stars

Allmusic called the album "a cheerfully mellow collection of easy rolling folk-pop", summarizing its mood by commenting that Hay "remains infatuated with what happens under the Southern Californian sun, whether it's rhapsodizing over the state itself or cherishing a flirtation with a shop girl, and it's easy to share his affections thanks to his easy, tasteful tunes." Popmatters also gave a firmly positive assessment of the album, commenting that "Throughout his solo career, Hay has specialized in agreeable, comfortable pop rock in the better sense of the words, and it's safe to say he's been getting better as he goes."

== Track listing ==
All songs written by Colin Hay.

1. "Oh California" – 4:02
2. "Prison Time" – 4:05
3. "There's Water Over You" – 3:57
4. "I Came Into Your Store" – 3:17
5. "No Time" – 3:02
6. "Broken Love" – 3:55
7. "I Can't Get Up Out of This Bed" – 3:31
8. "The End of Wilhelmina" – 3:41
9. "Baby Can I See You Tonight?" – 4:39
10. "Pleased to Almost Meet You" – 3:00
11. "American Sunshine (instrumental)" – 4:06
12. "Love Is Innocent (new recording)" [*] – 2:46
13. "Waiting for My Real Life to Begin (new recording)" [*] – 5:54

[*] Bonus Tracks (iTunes exclusive)
