= Human Cannonball (album) =

Studio album by School of Fish
- Released: February 23, 1993
- Genre: Alternative rock, jangle pop
- Length: 52:31
- Label: Capitol
- Producer: Matt Wallace

School of Fish chronology
School of Fish (1991)	Human Cannonball (1993)

Singles from Human Cannonball
- 1. "Take Me Anywhere" Released: 1993

Human Cannonball is the second and final album by the alternative rock group School of Fish, released in 1993 by Capitol Records.

== Production ==
The album was produced by Matt Wallace. Frontmen and songwriters Josh Clayton-Felt and Michael Ward were joined by a new bassist, John Pierce, and drummer, Josh Freese, for the recording of the album.

== Promotion ==
"Take Me Anywhere" was released as a lead single and peaked at No. 5 on Billboard's Modern Rock Tracks chart. The single featured a non-album track "Unrecognizable". The band supported the album with a North American tour.

== Critical reception ==
Professional ratings
Review scores
Source	Rating
AllMusic	3.5/5 stars
Los Angeles Daily News	3/4 stars

The Kitchener-Waterloo Record called the album "melodic, harmonic rock with an extremely hard edge." The Toronto Star concluded that "Human Cannonball offers a leaner, fresher sound than the band's debut, with a concentration on feel instead of perfection."

The Dallas Morning News wrote that the guitars "reign, at times engulfing singer-guitarist Josh Clayton-Felt's occasionally whiny vocals with little effort." The Los Angeles Daily News opined: "Caked with musical grunge, School of Fish's sophomore effort ... bridges the gap between melodiousness and guitar-driven chaos as well as any album since Nirvana's Nevermind."

== Track listing ==
All tracks written by Felt and Ward.

1. "Complicator" – 3:07
2. "Take Me Anywhere" – 4:44
3. "1/2 a Believer" – 3:17
4. "Fountain" – 6:14
5. "Fuzzed and Fading" – 5:05
6. "Blackout" – 3:29
7. "Everyword" – 3:37
8. "Jump Off the World" – 4:15
9. "Drop of Water" – 3:50
10. "Drag" – 5:20
11. "Stand in the Doorway" – 3:16
12. "Kerosene" – 6:17
13. "Lament" – 2:37

== Personnel ==
- Josh Clayton-Felt – Guitar, Vocals
- Michael Ward – Guitar, Vocals
- John Pierce – Bass, Cello
- Josh Freese – Drums, Dancing

Production

- Tony Phillips – Engineer, Mixing
- Matt Wallace – Production
