= Cecilia Noël =

Peruvian-born American musician

Cecilia Noël is a Peruvian-born Latin music artist, whose work, with her band, The Wild Clams, combines salsa, soul, jazz, funk, and Afro-Cuban traditions. At one time, she was dubbed the Latin Tina Turner. Noël is married to Men at Work singer Colin Hay, with whom she has frequently recorded and toured.

== Biography ==
=== Early life, education, and career ===
Born in Lima, Peru, Noël "first began singing at age 11 in a band named El Polen formed by her cousins". She then studied music in Argentina, and later in Heidelberg, Germany, before returning to Lima at age 14. There, "legendary jazz performer Stan Getz saw her perform, and a year later he invited her to New York to live with his family". She moved to the United States in the late 1980s, settling in Los Angeles in 1989, and debuted in the early 1990s with her band, The Wild Clams. In 1993, Noël sang with Carole King on a bonus tracks on 1993 Japanese edition of King's album, Colour of Your Dreams, on the song "Te Daria La Vida (Amor)" [Spanish Version of "Lay Down My Life"]. She was reviewed in the Los Angeles Times in 1994 as "arguably the most potent Latin sound to emerge from Los Angeles in years". She played at the 16th annual Playboy Jazz Festival in June 1994, and appeared on the Quincy Jones-produced late night talk show, Vibe, in August 1998.

=== Albums and songs ===
Noël released four studio albums, Delivery in 1998, Bongoland in 2003, A Gozar! in 2009, and Havana Rocks in 2014, along with a live album, Live in Hollywood, released in 2007.

In a 2001 project, Hong Kong-based director Wong Kar-wai used Noël's cover of the song "Unicornio", from the album of the same name by Cuban musician Silvio Rodríguez. One review speculated that Wong "deliberately chooses this version because of Cecilia Noël's personal history", noting that "her migratory routes resonate with Wong's 'transregional imagination'". Noël continued adding performers to the Wild Clams, so that by 2002 there were "as many as 18 performers onstage".

In 2003, Noël performed on the recording of a reimagined version of "Down Under" for husband Colin Hay's album Man @ Work, with the remake being described as "more carnivale than outback". In 2007, Noël sang on several tracks on the Lazlo Bane album, Guilty Pleasures, and was a special guest (along with Hay) on the Ringo Starr album, Ringo Starr: Live at Soundstage. She also appeared on a track for the 2008 soundtrack album, The Rocker: Music from the Motion Picture. In 2013, Noël's original song "Del Cielo" from the film Casa de mi padre was named on the 2013 Academy Awards Best Original Song short list, making it eligible for Oscar consideration in that category.

Havana Rocks, produced in 2014 during the Cuban thaw, was recorded in Havana, Cuba. In May 2015, Noël won the Cubadisco International Award, the Cuban equivalent to the Grammy Awards, as a nominee in the "Premios Internacionales" category. In July 2016, Noël and The Wild Clams kicked off the 23rd annual Oxnard Salsa Festival in Oxnard, California.

In 2022, Noël performed the song "Lagrimas Sin Fin" for the soundtrack of the film The Lost City, for which the song was written by Cheche Alara, El David Aguilar, and Pinar Toprak. The Los Angeles Times reported that Spotify's The Envelope listed the song as one of "the most dynamic, haunting and catchy original songs from this year's films".

== Personal life ==
Noël is married to singer Colin Hay of the band Men at Work, and often tours with her husband, providing background vocals for his shows. Noël has also helped to produce Hay's solo albums. For example, Hay said of his solo album, Are You Lookin' at Me? that:

She was really crucial. She was a really great sounding board for me. She's a really good producer in the sense that she's very musical and has a great sense of song structure and so forth. So she was great to bounce ideas off. And she sang on nearly all the songs. So she was really a great part of this record.

Hay has noted that he has also "poached a couple members from her band" for his tours. Hay and Noël live in Topanga Canyon, near Los Angeles, California.
