= Man @ Work =

2003 studio album by Colin Hay

Studio album by Colin Hay
- Released: 22 July 2003
- Genre: Rock, pop rock, acoustic rock
- Length: 38:01
- Label: Compass
- Producer: Colin Hay

Colin Hay chronology
| Company of Strangers (2002) | Man @ Work (2003) | Are You Lookin' at Me? (2007) |

Man @ Work is the eighth studio album by Scottish Australian singer Colin Hay, released by Compass Records in July 2003.

A second volume is scheduled for release on 18 July 2025.

== Overview ==
The album is a career-retrospective for Hay: he is best known as the lead singer for the 1980s Australian pop band Men at Work, and roughly half of the songs on this album are Hay's solo studio renderings of works from the Men at Work catalog, while several others are remixes or re-recordings of material from his solo albums. Some songs are almost identical to the original recordings (e.g. "Be Good Johnny") while others are complete reinterpretations (e.g. acoustic versions of "Down Under" and "Who Can It Be Now?").

The album concludes with a version of "Down Under" recorded with the group Wild Clams.

The album was re-released on vinyl in 2014 with different tracklisting replacing several tracks with new ones.

== Reception ==
Professional ratings
Review scores
| Source | Rating |
|---|---|
| AllMusic | 2.5/5 stars |

AllMusic gave a mostly negative review of the album, saying of the Men at Work covers that "While such acoustic Men at Work tracks as "Overkill" and "Who Can It Be Now?" are quite charming and worth hearing, as well as re-recordings of "Be Good Johnny" and "It's a Mistake" (which are almost identical to the originals) however worthy in their own right." They summarized his solo reworkings as "worth hearing, but of course, they're not up to the high Business as Usual standards." They concluded that the album "will only be of interest to the hardest of hardcore Colin Hay fan."

The Associated Press wrote that, "In the best possible sense, Man @ Work is like Colin Hay's cover version of his own greatest hits album."

== Track listing ==
All tracks written by Colin Hay, except where noted.

CD
| No. | Title | Writer(s) | Original release | Length |
|---|---|---|---|---|
| 1. | "Beautiful World" (alternate mix) | | Company of Strangers | 3:39 |
| 2. | "Down Under" (acoustic version) | Hay, Ron Strykert | Men at Work's Business as Usual | 3:33 |
| 3. | "Overkill" (acoustic version) | | Men at Work's Cargo | 3:47 |
| 4. | "Storm in My Heart" (new recording) | | Wayfaring Sons | 3:09 |
| 5. | "Looking for Jack" (new recording) | Hay, Jeremy Alsop | Looking for Jack | 4:07 |
| 6. | "Don't Be Afraid" | | Previously unreleased | 2:56 |
| 7. | "It's a Mistake" (new recording) | | Cargo | 4:46 |
| 8. | "Waiting for My Real Life to Begin" (re-release) | Hay, Thom Mooney | Going Somewhere | 5:45 |
| 9. | "To Have and to Hold" | | Previously unreleased | 3:29 |
| 10. | "Who Can It Be Now?" (acoustic version) | | Business as Usual | 3:24 |
| 11. | "Be Good Johnny" (new recording) | Hay, Greg Ham | Business as Usual | 3:35 |
| 12. | "Love is Innocent" | | Previously unreleased | 4:43 |
| 13. | "Down Under" (new recording, featuring Cecilia Noël & the Wild Clams) | Hay, Strykert | Business as Usual | 4:48 |

LP Side One
| No. | Title | Writer(s) | Original release | Length |
|---|---|---|---|---|
| 1. | "Beautiful World" (alternate mix) | | Company of Strangers | 3:39 |
| 2. | "Down Under" (acoustic version) | Hay, Strykert | Business as Usual | 3:33 |
| 3. | "Love is Innocent" (re-release) | | Previously unreleased | 4:43 |
| 4. | "It's a Mistake" (acoustic version / new recording) | | Cargo | 4:46 |
| 5. | "Waiting for My Real Life to Begin" (re-release) | Hay, Mooney | Going Somewhere | 5:45 |

Side Two
| No. | Title | Writer(s) | Original release | Length |
|---|---|---|---|---|
| 6. | "Who Can It Be Now?" (acoustic version) | | Business as Usual | 3:24 |
| 7. | "Overkill" (acoustic version) | | Cargo | 3:47 |
| 8. | "I Can See It in Your Eyes" (acoustic version / new recording) | | Business as Usual | 4:30 |
| 9. | "I Just Don't Think I'll Ever Get Over You" (radio edit) | | Transcendental Highway | 4:24 |
| 10. | "Down by the Sea" (acoustic version) | Hay, Strykert, Ham, Jerry Speiser | Business as Usual | 3:35 |

== Personnel ==
- Colin Hay – acoustic guitar, bass, guitar, keyboards, vocals
- Jeff Babko – organ, piano, keyboards
- Luis Conte – percussion
- Jonathan Dresel – drums
- Jimmy Earl — bass
- Bill Esparza – saxophone
- Chad Fischer — percussion, drums, recorder, background vocals
- Mario Gonzales – trumpet
- Greg Ham – flute
- Andrés "Dez" Hernandez – turntables
- Eric Jorgensen – trombone
- Cecilia Noël – piano, background vocals, vocal harmony
- Lee Thornburg – trumpet
- Guillermo Vadala – bass
- Lyle Workman — guitar
- Toshi Yanagi – guitar

== Production ==
- Producer: Colin Hay
- Engineers: Dave Dale, Juan Pablo Fallucca, Chad Fischer, Colin Hay, Edwardo McKinley
- Mixing: Juan Pablo Fallucca, Chad Fischer, Colin Hay, Edwardo McKinley
- Loops: Chad Fischer
- Drum programming: Chad Fischer
- Design: Griffin Norman
- Photography: Gregory Cannon, Cecilia Noël
- Cover painting: Norval
