= Inarticulate Nature Boy =

Studio album by Josh Clayton-Felt
- Released: March 19, 1996
- Recorded: 1993–94
- Genre: Pop rock
- Length: 53:40
- Label: A&M
- Producer: Tony Phillips

Josh Clayton-Felt chronology
Inarticulate Nature Boy (1996)	...Felt Like Making a Live Record (1997)

Inarticulate Nature Boy is the debut solo album by American rock musician Josh Clayton-Felt. It was released on March 19, 1996, through A&M Records.

== Background and recording ==
After the break-up of his group School of Fish, singer-guitarist Clayton-Felt began learning to play keyboards, bass, and drums in addition to guitar. He began recording 25 songs over the next few years. Although his friend and former bandmate Michael Ward added some guitar tracks, and he had a little help on percussion, Clayton-Felt for the most part played all the other instruments off this album. The track "Window" reached No. 49 on Radio & Records' Alternative chart.

== Critical reception ==
Professional ratings
Review scores
Source	Rating
AllMusic	3/5 stars

Critic Roch Pariesien called the album "more casual, relaxed, and eccentric" than Clayton-Felt's work in School of Fish. Pariesien concludes his review by lumping Clayton-Felt "into a loose class of former-band-frontman solo artists" such as Michael Been of the Call and Ian McNabb of the Icicle Works. However, he adds, "If anyone out there, just to prove me wrong, chooses to start a campaign to make Nature Boy a huge hit rather than a tiny cult phenomenon, please let me know so I can be first in line to buy a second copy."

== Track listing ==
All tracks written by Josh Clayton-Felt.

No.	Title	Length
1.	"Window"	5:10
2.	"Soon Enough"	5:40
3.	"Paint the Tree Green"	4:42
4.	"What Do I Know"	4:18
5.	"Dead American"	4:25
6.	"Matchbox Head"	4:55
7.	"Bigger Than Me"	5:02
8.	"Inarticulate Nature Boy"	3:49
9.	"Waiting"	3:08
10.	"Doubt"	3:38
11.	"Helpless"	3:57
12.	"Trumpet"	4:56
