= Peaks & Valleys =

Studio album by Colin Hay
- Released: February 1992
- Recorded: 1991
- Genre: Pop rock
- Length: 48:15
- Label: EastWest
- Producer: Colin Hay

Colin Hay chronology
Wayfaring Sons (1990)	Peaks & Valleys (1992)	Topanga (1994)

Peaks & Valleys is the third solo album by Scottish–Australian singer Colin Hay, released in February 1992. Hay recorded each song in one take, over a seven day period, in a Melbourne recording studio, owned by former Men at Work band member, Greg Ham.

Hay discussing the album in an interview with The Canberra Times in 1992, commented "I want it to be a monumental smash, I doubt it will be, but that's what I would like. I'm prepared to be disappointed but I'm also prepared to be very excited. I don't have any control over what happens to it now, it's in the lap of the gods." He went onto to say "I play the guitar and I sing a song and entertain, that's my job and if people like listening to it - that's great, that makes me feel fulfilled."

The album was re-released in 1996 by BMG, in 1998 by Lazyeye Records and in 2006 by Compasss Records.

== Reviews ==
Professional ratings
Review scores
Source	Rating
AllMusic	3/5 stars

Stephen Thomas Erlewine on AllMusic stated, "Even though it doesn't contain any truly outstanding songs, Peaks & Valleys is a pleasant and engaging collection of jangly, vaguely reggae-ish pop from Colin Hay, demonstrating that his melodic skills have not left him."

== Track listing ==
All songs written by Colin Hay, except where noted.

1. "Into the Cornfields" – 3:56
2. "She Keeps Me Dreaming" (Hay, Deborah Conway) – 3:47
3. "Can't Take This Town" – 3:25
4. "Walk Amongst His Ruins" – 3:29
5. "Hold Onto My Hand" – 4:54
6. "Keep on Walking" – 2:28
7. "Dream On" – 5:16
8. "Boy Boy" – 2:16
9. "Conversation" – 3:13
10. "Melbourne Song" – 2:44
11. "Sometimes I Wish" – 6:26
12. "Go Ask an Old Man" – 2:54
13. "Sea Dogs" – 3:27

== Personnel ==
=== Musicians ===
- Colin Hay – acoustic guitar, guitar, vocals, 12 string acoustic guitar
- Deborah Conway – vocals ("She Keeps Me Dreaming")

=== Production ===
- Colin Hay – producer, mixing
- Martin Pullan – engineer, mastering, mixing

== Charts ==
Chart (1992)	Peak position
Australian Albums (ARIA Charts)	126
