= Gathering Mercury =

Studio album by Colin Hay
- Released: 9 May 2011
- Recorded: The Washroom, Topanga, California; Lookout Sound, Los Angeles, California
- Genre: Rock
- Length: 39:04
- Labels: Compass Records, Lazy Eye
- Producer: Colin Hay

Colin Hay chronology
American Sunshine (2009)	Gathering Mercury (2011)	Next Year People (2015)

Gathering Mercury is the eleventh studio album by Colin Hay, released on 9 May 2011, on Compass Records. Regarding the album's thematic content, Hay said, "I think it’s about life and loss and the injustice of the way the universe is set up; how we lose people we love."

== Background and recording ==
The album is partly inspired by the death of Hay's father in 2010. On the album's release, Hay noted, "The loss of my father last year brought an unavoidable emotional contingent to writing and recording. I don’t have a definitive belief in an afterlife, but I do feel like I had his help when I was working on this album, especially alone late at night, in the studio. [...] The night my father died, I was in Glasgow on the River Clyde, about twenty streets away from where he was born. There’s some kind of bleak poetry in that, very bleak."

Gathering Mercury was recorded at Hay's home studio, The Washroom.

== Reception ==
Professional ratings
Review scores
Source	Rating
The Daily Telegraph	(favorable)
Chicago Sun-Times	2/5 stars
Allmusic	4/5 stars

Allmusic's Stephen Thomas Erlewine gave the album a positive review, writing, "Although it’s a full production with electric guitars, pianos, backing voices, and drums, it leaves the impression of an intimate acoustic performance, partially because the songs are so casually lyrical in their description of the everyday."

== Track listing ==
1. "Send Somebody" (Georgiades, Hay) – 4:37
2. "Family Man" (Hay) – 4:24
3. "Invisible" (Hay) – 4:03
4. "Dear Father" (Hay) – 3:19
5. "Gathering Mercury" (Hay, Noel) – 4:21
6. "Half a Million Angels" (Georgiades) – 4:03
7. "Far from Home" (Hay) – 3:53
8. "Where the Sky Is Blue" (Hay) – 4:05
9. "A Simple Song" (Hay) – 3:30
10. "Goodnight Romeo" (Hay) – 2:49

Deluxe edition tracks

1. "Send Somebody (Stripped Mix)" (Hay) – 4:35
2. "Invisible (Stripped Mix)" (Hay) – 3:51
3. "Half a Million Angels (Stripped Mix)" (Hay) – 4:03
4. "Where the Sky Is Blue (Stripped Mix)" (Hay) – 4:05

== Personnel ==
=== Musicians ===
- Colin Hay - vocals, acoustic and electric guitars, gryphon twelve-string guitar (4), harmonium (4, 10), lap steel guitar (8), banjo (8), woodskin (9)
- Chad Fischer - drums (1, 8) percussion (1, 2, 5, 7) piano (1, 5), backing vocals (1, 5), bass guitar (5), xylophone (1), bells (2), mellotron (4)
- Joe Karnes - bass guitar (1, 7, 8)
- Jeff Babko - piano (2, 6, 8), organ (3, 7)
- Jimmy Earl - bass guitar (2, 3, 6)
- Cecilia Nöel - harmony and backing vocals (3, 6, 7, 8), maracas (9)
- Charlie Paxson - drums (2)
- Michael Georgiades - acoustic and electric guitars (1), backing vocals (1)
- Randy Cooke - drums (3, 6, 7)
- Sean Woolstenhulme - electric guitar (3, 6)
- Luis Conte - percussion (3, 6)
- Oliver Kraus - cello, viola and string arrangements (4)
- Rob Clores - piano and harmonium (5)
- Kaveh Rastegar - double bass (9)

=== Recording personnel ===
- Colin Hay - producer, engineer
- Chad Fischer - co-producer (1, 5), additional engineering, mixing
- Randy LeRoy - mastering

=== Artwork ===
- Martin Smith - photography
- Robert Hakalski - package design, booklet photos
