= Topanga (album) =

Studio album by Colin Hay
- Released: 7 December 1994
- Genre: Pop rock
- Length: 50:40
- Labels: Lazy Eye Records, Newmarket Records
- Producer: Colin Hay

Colin Hay chronology
Peaks & Valleys (1992)	Topanga (1994)	Transcendental Highway (1998)

Topanga is the fourth solo album by Scottish-Australian singer Colin Hay, released in 1994. It was the first released on his own label Lazy Eye Records.

According to Australian musicologist, Ian McFarlane, it "sold well in Canada, Germany and Brazil. In July, Hay set off on his solo Man at Work Australian tour."

The songs "Into the Cornfields" and "Can't Take This Town" appeared in different versions on Hay's previous album, Peaks & Valleys.

== Track listing ==
All songs written by Colin Hay, except where noted.

1. "I Haven't Seen You in a Long Time" – 3:19
2. "Into the Cornfields" – 4:09
3. "Waiting for My Real Life To Begin" (Hay, Mooney) – 4:57
4. "Can't Take This Town" – 4:51
5. "I Think I Know" – 3:59
6. "Against the Tide" (Clifforth, Hay) – 4:53
7. "I Don't Miss You Now" – 2:55
8. "She Put the Blame on You" – 3:48
9. "Woman's Face" – 5:14
10. "Lost Generation" (Capek, Hay) – 3:57
11. "Road to Mandalay" – 3:47
12. "Ooh, Ooh, Ooh, Ooh Baby" – 4:51

Bonus track on the 2003 German edition

13. "Overkill (Acoustic version)" – 3:46

Bonus track on the 2009 re-mastered deluxe edition

13. "Spencer The Rover" – 4:35

== Personnel ==
- Colin Hay – acoustic guitar, guitar, bass, electric guitar, vocals, slide guitar
- Phil Butson – electric guitar
- John Clifforth – acoustic guitar, keyboards
- Joe Creighton – bass
- Chad Fischer – drums, tambourine
- Paul Gadsby – bass
- Gerry Hale – fiddle, mandolin
- Greg Ham – saxophone
- Bruce Haymes – organ, piano
- Martin Tillman – cello

== Production ==
- Producer: Colin Hay
- Mixing: Phil Butson
- Engineer: Phil Butson
- Mastering: Stephen Marcussen
- Engineer: Micajah Ryan
- Photography: Isamu Sawa

== Charts ==
Chart (1994/1996)	Peak position
Australian Albums (ARIA Charts)	200
