= Transcendental Highway =

Studio album by Colin Hay
- Released: February 1998
- Genre: Pop rock
- Length: 56:45
- Labels: Lazy Eye Records, Festival Records
- Producers: Colin Hay, Dave Dale

Colin Hay chronology
Topanga (1994)	Transcendental Highway (1998)	Going Somewhere (2000)

Professional ratings
Review scores
Source	Rating
Allmusic	4/5 stars

Transcendental Highway is the fifth studio album by Scottish-Australian singer Colin Hay, released in February 1998.

== Track listing ==
All songs written by Colin Hay except where noted:

1. "Transcendental Highway" (Dave Dale, Hay) – 5:49
2. "Don't Believe You Anymore" (Dale, Hay) – 3:56
3. "My Brilliant Feat" (Hay, Colin Talbot) – 5:48
4. "Goodbye My Red Rose" – 3:32
5. "If I Go" (Dale, Hay, Bobby Z.) – 4:27
6. "I'm Doing Fine" – 4:59
7. "Wash It All Away" (Dale, Hay) – 3:24
8. "Cactus" – 4:43
9. "Death Row Conversation" – 4:55
10. "I'll Leave the Light On" – 4:39
11. "Freedom Calling" – 5:05
12. "I Just Don't Think I'll Ever Get Over You" – 5:19
13. "You Hold On to Me [Demo] – 2:04 (hidden track)

== Personnel ==
- Colin Hay – acoustic guitar, bass, piano, electric guitar, vocals, e-bow, baritone guitar
- Dave Dale – percussion, cymbals, drums, electric guitar, background vocals, chamberlin, tape effects
- Chad Fischer – percussion, concertina, cymbals, drums, electric guitar, background vocals
- Glen Holmen – bass
- Ethan Johns – harmonium
- Robbie Kilgore – organ, piano, keyboards
- Dan Rothchild – bass
- Lynne Davis – bass
- Martin Tillman – cello

== Production ==
- Producers: Colin Hay, Dave Dale
- Engineers: Colin Hay, Dave Dale
- Mixing: Colin Hay, Dave Dale
- Mastering: Gavin Lurssen
- Drum programming: Dave Dale
- Loops: Dave Dale

== Charts ==
Chart (1998)	Peak position
Australian Albums (ARIA Charts)	184
