= School of Fish (album) =

Studio album by School of Fish
- Released: April 1991
- Recorded: 1990
- Genre: Rock
- Length: 44:14
- Label: Capitol
- Producer: John Porter

School of Fish chronology
School of Fish (1991)	Human Cannonball (1993)

Singles from School of Fish
- 1. "3 Strange Days" Released: 1991

School of Fish is the debut studio album by the American band School of Fish. It was released in April 1991.

== Promotion ==
The album was supported by the single "3 Strange Days", which peaked at No. 12 on the Mainstream Rock Tracks. The single included two non-album tracks: the original composition "Where Have I Been" and the cover of Prince's "Let's Pretend We're Married".

== Critical reception ==
Professional ratings
Review scores
Source	Rating
AllMusic	4/5 stars
Calgary Herald	C

The Calgary Herald noted that "neo-psychedelic guitar-grunge swirls beneath the surface of each song." The San Diego Union-Tribune concluded that the band "concocted an irresistible brew of tough-guy guitars, sweet vocals and thoughtful lyrics that sounds like a cross between Free, the Babys and Crowded House."

== Track listing ==
All tracks written by Josh Clayton-Felt & Michael Ward, except where noted.

1. "Intro" - 1:42
2. "3 Strange Days" - 5:12
3. "Talk Like Strangers" - 3:37
4. "Deep End" - 4:54
5. "King of the Dollar" (Felt/Jagger/Richards/Ward) - 2:47
6. "Speechless" - 4:56
7. "Wrong" - 4:28
8. "Rose Colored Glasses" - 3:43
9. "Under the Microscope" - 4:34
10. "Fell" - 2:50
11. "Euphoria" - 5:45

== Personnel ==
School of Fish

- Josh Clayton-Felt – vocals, guitar, drum box
- Michael Ward – lead guitar, background vocals, drum box
- M.P. – drums
- Dominic Nardini – bass guitar

Production

- Produced by John Porter
- Engineered by Dave "Death" Pine, assisted by Ken Paulakovich and Lee Manning
- Mixed at Chapel Studio
- Art direction – Tommy Steele
- Design – Heather Van Haaften
- Photography – Dennis Keeley

== Charts ==
Year	Chart	Position
1991	US Heatseekers Albums	5
1991	US The Billboard 200	142
