= Looking for Jack =

Studio album by Colin James Hay
- Released: January 1987
- Genre: Pop rock
- Length: 47:19
- Label: Columbia
- Producer: Robin Millar

Colin Hay chronology
Looking for Jack (1987)	Wayfaring Sons (1990)

Looking for Jack is the debut solo album by Men at Work lead singer Colin Hay (under his full name), released in January 1987.

Though the album was originally released with ten songs, the B-side to the single "Can I Hold You?", "Nature of the Beast" (cowritten by Jeremy Alsop), was included as track 6 on some CD releases. Musician credits for the song are unknown.

== Reception ==
Professional ratings
Review scores
Source	Rating
AllMusic	3/5 stars

In their retrospective review, AllMusic criticised the album's "big drum sound and big rock arrangements", which they said "threaten at times to overshadow Hay's songwriting and singing." However, they praised the title track and "Circles Erratica" as highlights of Hay's career.

== Track listing ==
All tracks are written by Colin Hay, except where noted.

Side One
No.	Title	Writer(s)	Length
1.	"Hold Me"		4:09
2.	"Can I Hold You?"		3:35
3.	"Looking for Jack"	Jeremy Alsop, Hay	4:10
4.	"Master of Crime"		4:57
5.	"These Are Our Finest Days"		4:07

Side Two
No.	Title	Length
6.	"Puerto Rico"	4:28
7.	"Ways of the World"	4:05
8.	"I Don't Need You Anymore"	3:04
9.	"Circles Erratica"	4:02
10.	"Fisherman's Friend"	5:31

== Personnel ==
Credits adapted from original CD release.

- Colin Hay - vocals (all tracks), acoustic guitar (1, 6–9), electric guitar, (1–9) keyboards (2, 8), 12-string guitar (1), E-Bow (2, 8–10)

Musicians

- Jeremy Alsop - bass (all tracks), keyboards (1, 2, 4, 5–8), bass synthesizer (10)
- Dave Bitelli - baritone saxophone (4), tenor saxophone (1, 9)
- Mike Brittain - double bass (10)
- Raul d'Oliveira - trumpet (1, 4, 9)
- Herbie Hancock - piano (3)
- Ginya Joseph - backing vocals (1)
- Chris Laurence - double bass (10)
- Joe Legwabe - backing vocals (1)
- Dee Lewis - backing vocals (2, 4, 6, 7)
- Linda Lewis - backing vocals (2, 4, 6, 7)
- Helen Liebmann - cello (10)
- Martin Loveday - cello (10)
- Ashley Maher - backing vocals (1)
- Noel McCalla - backing vocals (2, 4, 6, 7)
- Robbie McIntosh - electric guitar (2), lead guitar (7)
- Morris Michael - vocals (2, 4, 6, 7)
- Robin Millar - keyboards (2)
- Nick Payn - tenor saxophone (4)
- Nick Pentelow - tenor saxophone (4)
- Rufus Sefothoma - backing vocals (1)
- Steve Sidwell - trumpet (1, 4, 9)
- Rick Taylor - trombone (1, 4, 9)
- Chad Wackerman - drums (all tracks), percussion (1, 4, 6, 9)
- Paul "Wix" Wickens - Hammond organ Russell Hitchcock - vocals

Production

- Producer, Horn and String Arranger: Robin Millar
- Engineer: Tim Kramer
- Assistant engineers: Dave Anderson, Phil Legg, Nick Sykes
- Mixing Engineer: Warne Livesey
- Photography: David P. Bailey
- Studio artwork: Bill Smith

== Charts ==
Chart (1987)	Peak position
Australian (Kent Music Report)	58
US (Billboard 200)	126
