= Going Somewhere =

Studio album by Colin Hay
- Released: 24 April 2001
- Recorded: 2000–2001
- Genre: Pop rock
- Length: 49:43
- Label: Lazy Eye
- Producer: Colin Hay

Colin Hay chronology
Transcendental Highway (1998)	Going Somewhere (2001)	Company of Strangers (2002)

Professional ratings
Review scores
Source	Rating
Allmusic	2.5/5 stars

Going Somewhere is the sixth solo album by Scottish–Australian singer Colin Hay, released in 2001.

== Track listing ==
All songs written by Colin Hay, except where noted.

1. "Beautiful World" – 4:04
2. "Looking for Jack" (Alsop, Hay) – 2:56
3. "Going Somewhere" – 2:40
4. "Wayfaring Sons" – 3:42
5. "Children on Parade" – 3:38
6. "My Brilliant Feat" (Hay, Talbot) – 3:26
7. "Waiting for My Real Life to Begin" (Hay, Mooney) – 5:46
8. "Don't Wait Up" – 4:00
9. "Lifeline" (Fischer, Hay) – 4:02
10. "Circles Erratica" – 4:05
11. "Water Song" – 4:10
12. "Maggie" – 4:21
13. "I Don't Know Why" – 2:53

An extended version of the album features two bonus tracks:

1. "Waiting for My Real Life to Begin" (Radio Edit) – 3:40
2. " Just Don't Think I'll Ever Get Over You" (Radio Edit) – 4:29

A special Australian tour edition added an acoustic reworking of Overkill as the first track, in response to Hay's appearance performing the song on the television show Scrubs. The track later reappeared on the 2003 album Man @ Work.

== Legacy ==
The song "Waiting for My Real Life to Begin" has been featured in a number of television series: Scrubs (sung by the cast), Dawson's Creek, The Hills, What About Brian, Cane, The Cleaner, Judging Amy (Season 2, Episode 22 'Hold on Tight' end sequence), Miami Medical, and Brothers & Sisters and A Million Little Things (2020).

The song was also featured in the films Penguin Bloom, Morning Glory, and Words & Pictures.

In December 2005, Hay and Heather Mills digitally re-released "My Brilliant Feat" as a charity single as a tribute to the late footballer George Best who died on 25 November 2005. Proceeds went to the Donor Family Network supporting organ donor families and promoting organ and tissue donation.
