= Wayfaring Sons =

Studio album by Colin Hay Band
- Released: 1990
- Recorded: 1989
- Genre: Pop
- Length: 38:21
- Label: MCA
- Producers: Elliot Scheiner, Colin Hay

Colin Hay Band chronology
Looking for Jack (1987)	Wayfaring Sons (1990)	Peaks & Valleys (1992)

Wayfaring Sons is the second solo album by the Scottish-Australian singer Colin Hay, released in 1990. The album peaked at number 118 on the ARIA charts.

== Critical reception ==
Professional ratings
Review scores
Source	Rating
AllMusic	2.5/5 stars
Calgary Herald	C−
Windsor Star	C

The Calgary Herald wrote: "From Australia, basic pop music that owes a lot to what are allegedly the traditional sounds of Scotland." The Globe and Mail opined that "numbers such as the title cut and 'Ya (Rest in Peace)' offer the best fusion of traditional sounds and modern rock this side of The Waterboys." The Windsor Star concluded that, "like Men at Work, there's a hollowness about the music that keeps it from being anything more than mildly diverting."

== Track listing ==
All songs written by Colin Hay, except where noted.

1. "Wayfaring Sons" – 3:31
2. "Into My Life" – 4:20
3. "Storm in My Heart" – 3:33
4. "Dream On (In the Night)" – 4:56
5. "Not So Lonely" (Hay, Robert Dillon, Paul Gadsby, Gerry Hale) – 4:16
6. "Don't Drink the Water" – 3:43
7. "Help Me" – 3:04
8. "Dreamtime in Glasgow" – 3:51
9. "Back in My Loving Arms" (Hay, Dillon, Gadsby, Hale) – 3:31
10. "Ya (Rest in Peace)" – 3:53

== Personnel ==
- Colin Hay – vocals, acoustic 12-string guitar, acoustic 6-string guitar, electric guitar, E-Bow
- Gerry Hale – violin, mandolin, background vocals
- Paul Gadsby – bass guitar, background vocals
- Robert Dillon – drums, percussion
- Robby Kilgore – keyboards
- Jann Karam – background vocals ("Not So Lonely")

== Charts ==
Chart (1990)	Peak position
Australian Albums (ARIA Charts)	118
