= Are You Lookin' at Me? =

Studio album by Colin Hay
- Released: 24 April 2007
- Genre: Rock, pop rock
- Label: Compass, Lazy Eye
- Producer: Colin Hay, Chad Fischer

Colin Hay chronology
Man @ Work (2003)	Are You Lookin' at Me? (2007)	American Sunshine (2009)

Professional ratings
Review scores
Source	Rating
Allmusic	4/5 stars
Popmatters	7/10 stars
StarPulse	3.5/5 stars

Are You Lookin' at Me? is the ninth studio album by Scottish-Australian musician, Colin Hay. It was released by Compass Records on 24 April 2007.

== Reception ==
Stephen Erlewine of AllMusic said of the album, "Released in the spring of 2007, Are You Lookin' at Me? is his ninth solo album, but there is a difference in his approach on this record. Here, he sounds relaxed, comfortable with his status as a cult singer/songwriter, so he's not trying to have hits or sound hip, he's simply lying back and writing songs that are wry, easy, and quite charming. There are some echoes of mortality that ring throughout this record -- from the title track, which looks back at his childhood, to passing references to death, or even his acknowledgement that he doesn't think there are better days to come on "Land of the Midnight Sun"—but this is hardly a dour, depressive album. It's the opposite: it's warm and witty, tuneful and engaging. Even when he's mining a sad vein, he tempers it with his mildly cynical humor, which gives this a distinct lyrical world view, but what really sets Are You Lookin' at Me? apart from his other solo albums is that it gels as a singer/songwriter album. He's no longer trying too hard to be either commercial or introspective; he's letting his music flow easily, and supported by a very good road band, it makes for his best solo album to date."

== Track listing ==
All songs written by Colin Hay.

1. "Are You Lookin' at Me?" - 4:14
2. "Lose to Win" - 4:00
3. "Here in My Hometown" - 5:26
4. "Up in Smoke" - 3:39
5. "No One Knows" - 4:01
6. "This Time I Got You" - 4:10
7. "Lonely Without You" - 3:56
8. "What Would Bob Do?" - 4:49
9. "Pure Love" - 3:27
10. "Me and My Imaginary Friend" - 3:05
11. "Land of the Midnight Sun" - 4:30
12. "I Wish I Was Still Drinking" - 4:14

== Personnel ==
- Colin Hay - vocals, guitar, drums, bass, vox organ, concertina, mandolin
- Chad Fischer - drums on "This Time I Got You" and "Me and My Imaginary Friend", percussion on "This Time I Got You", co-producer on "This Time I Got You" and "I Wish I Was Still Drinking"
- Larry Goldings - piano, organ on "I Wish I Was Still Drinking"
