= Company of Strangers (Colin Hay album) =

Company Of Strangers

Studio album by Colin Hay
- Released: September 2002
- Recorded: Igloo Music, Burbank; Lookout Sound, Los Angeles; The Wash Room, Topanga
- Genres: Rock, pop rock
- Length: 47 min
- Label: Lazy Eye

Colin Hay chronology
Going Somewhere (2000)	Company Of Strangers (2002)	Man @ Work (2003)

Professional ratings
Review scores
Source	Rating
Allmusic	3.5/5 stars

Company Of Strangers is the seventh solo album by Scottish-Australian singer Colin Hay. It was released in 2002 on Hay's independent record label, Lazy Eye.

== Reception ==
In Erelwine's Allmusic review he indicates that whilst the album was largely unnoticed in 2002, it did become a minor pivotal moment in Hay's career. "At this time, he had yet to become a regular on L.A.’s Largo-based singer-songwriter scene and was still struggling to shake off the stigma of being a new wave relic. While he was struggling to hit upon the right image, he had found the right sound, creating nicely crafted mature music that swayed between sunbleached strummed acoustics and clever little pop numbers."

Other reviews of the album describe it as a powerful blend of acoustic guitars, rock and R&B styles, lush string arrangements, storytelling lyrics and distinctive vocal melodies, with highlights including the hard driving rocker, "I Got Woken Up", the delicate "Company of Strangers" and the colorful "Beautiful World".

== Release ==
In 2010 the album was remastered, re-packaged in an Eco wallet and re-issued by Compass Records, with the inclusion of a bonus track, an acoustic re-working of "Company of Strangers".

== Uses in other media ==
"Beautiful World" featured in the final episode, "My Last Day", of the first season of Scrubs, originally broadcast on 21 May 2002 on NBC; it also appeared on the 2002 Music from Scrubs soundtrack.

== Track listing ==
All songs written by Colin Hay, except where noted.

1. "I Got Woken Up" – 3:40
2. "Small Town Big Hell" – 4:24
3. "Lucky Bastard" (Hay, Paul Kelly) – 4:02
4. "Company of Strangers" – 4:47
5. "No Win Situation" (Hay, Chad Fischer) – 3:00
6. "Dear J" – 3:17
7. "Small Price To Be Free" – 4:55
8. "How Long Will It Last" (Hay, Fischer) – 3:38
9. "Lifeline" (Hay, Fischer) – 3:51
10. "Don't Wait Up" – 5:26
11. "Beautiful World" – 3:40
12. "And If You Only Knew" – 3:05

== Personnel ==
- Colin Hay – vocals, guitar
- Toshi Yanagi – guitar
- Albert Wing – saxophone
- Chad Fischer – piano, drums, percussion, background vocals, engineer, mixing
- Jeff Babko – keyboards
- Larry Goldings – piano on "Small Price To Be Free" and "Don't Wait Up"
