= Colin Hay =

Scottish-Australian musician (born 1953)

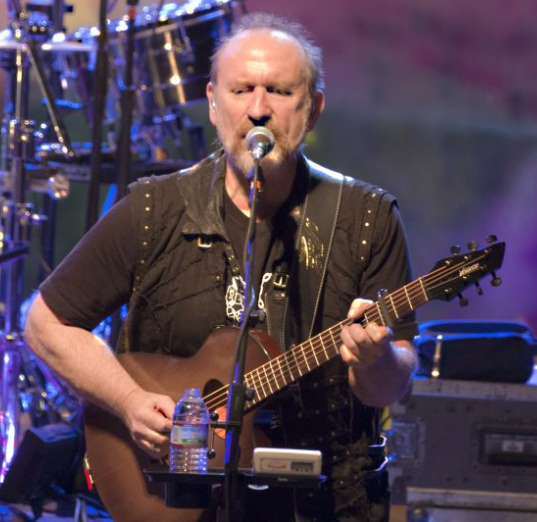
- Hay performing in 2018

Background information
- Born: Colin James Hay; 29 June 1953 (age 73); Kilwinning, Ayrshire, Scotland
- Origin: Melbourne, Victoria, Australia
- Genres: Rock; pop rock; new wave
- Occupations: Singer; musician; songwriter; actor
- Instruments: Vocals; guitar
- Years active: 1978–present
- Labels: CBS; MCA; Compass; Lazy Eye
- Member of: Men at Work; Ringo Starr & His All-Starr Band
- Spouse: Cecilia Noël
- Website: colinhay.com

Colin James Hay (born 29 June 1953) is a Scottish-Australian musician. He came to prominence as the lead vocalist and the sole continuous member of the band Men at Work, and later as a solo artist. Hay is a member of Ringo Starr & His All-Starr Band.

Hay has made appearances in films such as Cosi (1996) and in television shows such as The Resident, The Larry Sanders Show, JAG, The Mick Molloy Show, A Million Little Things, and Scrubs. In Scrubs, he performs an acoustic version of the Men at Work hit "Overkill" in the first episode of the second season, "My Overkill", along with a bit of the acoustic version of "Down Under" during a cutaway of the second episode of the seventh season, "My Hard Labor." His music also appeared in the television series What About Brian, The Black Donnellys, Cane, and the BBC medical drama Casualty.

== Early life ==
Colin James Hay was born on 29 June 1953 in Kilwinning, North Ayrshire, Scotland to James and Isabella Hay. In 1967, when he was 14, the Hays emigrated to Melbourne in Australia. His parents owned a small music shop; his father, a piano tuner, had been a stage singer and dancer in Glasgow.

== Career ==
=== 1978–1986: Men at Work ===
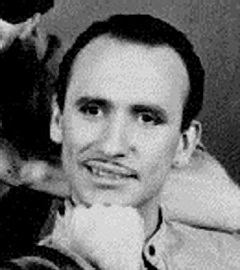
Hay in 1983

In 1978, Hay met Ron Strykert and they formed an acoustic duo. In 1979, Hay and Strykert added Jerry Speiser and Greg Ham and started composing songs for what would become Men at Work.

The band released their debut studio album, Business as Usual, in 1981, which was followed by Cargo (1983) and Two Hearts (1985) before breaking up in January 1986.

In 1986, Hay joined as guest vocalist with the Incredible Penguins for a cover of "Happy Xmas (War Is Over)", a charity project for research on little penguins, which peaked at No. 10 on the Australian Kent Music Report in December 1985.

=== 1987–1993: Solo career beginnings ===
Following the break-up of Men at Work in 1986, Hay released his debut single "Hold Me" in January 1987. The song peaked at number 40 on the Kent Music Report. His debut studio album, Looking for Jack was released in January 1987 and peaked at number 58.

Hay relocated to Los Angeles in 1989. He settled in the Topanga region of the city and has resided in the United States since. In January 2016, he became a US citizen.

In March 1990, Hay released "Into My Life", the lead single from his second studio album, Wayfaring Sons, which was released in April 1990. Neither single nor album reached the ARIA top 100. The album was credited to the Colin Hay Band, which consisted of Gerry Hale, Paul Gadsby and Robert Dillon.

In 1992, Hay released the acoustic album Peaks & Valleys. The album featured Hay's sister, Carol on vocals.

=== 1994–2004: ARIA Hall of Fame and Lazy Eye Records ===
At the ARIA Music Awards of 1994, Hay was inducted into the ARIA Hall of Fame as a member of Men at Work.

In 1994, Hay established his own recording label, Lazy Eye Records, and released his fourth studio album, Topanga.

In 1996, Hay reunited with Men at Work and toured South America, which led to the live Men at Work album, Brazil.

In October 1998, Hay released his fifth studio album, Transcendental Highway and in 1999 recorded and released the song "Misty Bay" with his girlfriend, Cecilia Noël.

On 1 October 2000, Hay performed with Men at Work at the 2000 Summer Olympics closing ceremony. In 2001, Hay released his sixth studio album, Going Somewhere.

In 2002, Hay released his seventh studio album Company of Strangers and the video album Live at the Continental recorded in 2000.

In July 2003, Hay released his eighth studio album, Man @ Work, re-recording some Men at Work hits and his solo songs, including a reimagined version of "Down Under" recorded with Hay's wife, Cecilia Noël, described as "more carnivale than outback". Hay toured North America with former Beatle Ringo Starr, as a member of his Ringo Starr & His All-Starr Band.

In 2004, Hay launched his one-man show named Man at Work, a mixture of songs and stories.

=== 2005–2020: Continued success ===
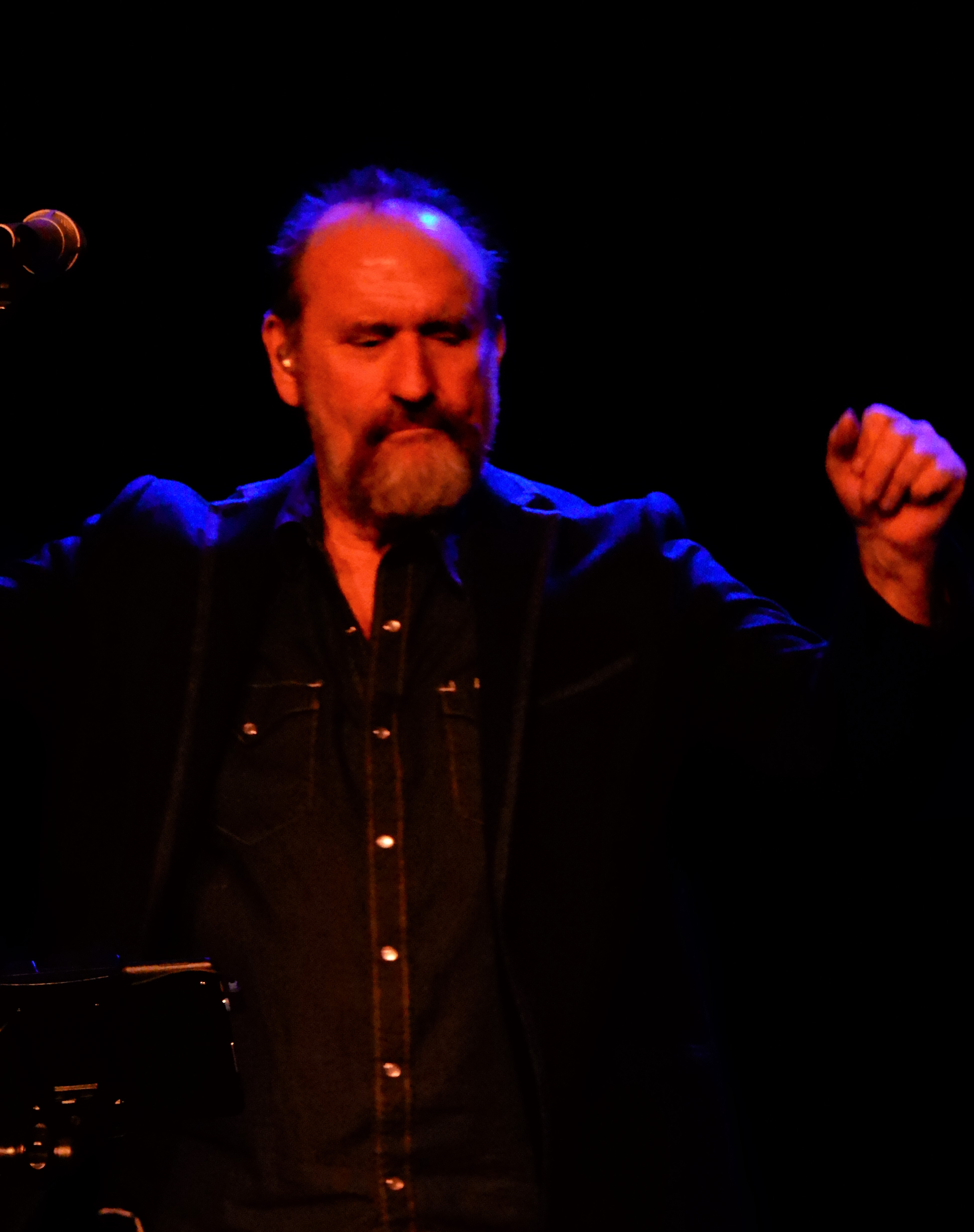
Hay performing in 2017

In 2006 Hay provided his voice for one of the characters in the animated film The Wild.

In April 2007, Hay released his ninth studio album, Are You Lookin' at Me?. In 2008, Hay played the role of Nick at the horror movie The Uninvited.

In May 2009, Hay performed at the Artist for the Arts Foundation benefit at Barnum Hall, Santa Monica High School, Santa Monica, California. Performing alongside Curt Smith of Tears for Fears, Fee Waybill of the Tubes, Venice, and over 70 members of the Santa Monica High School Orchestra and Girls Choir, the benefit helped to provide funds for the continuation of music education in public schools.

In August 2009, Hay released his tenth studio album, American Sunshine.

In 2010, Hay released the live album, Live at the Corner, filmed in 2007 at the Corner Hotel in Melbourne, Australia.

In August 2010, Hay performed in Missoula, Montana with a Los Angeles roots rock band named Patrolled By Radar.

In May 2011, Hay released his eleventh studio album Gathering Mercury. In 2011, Hay commented on his early solo career, stating, "After Men at Work, for the better part of a decade, I was stumbling around being unfocused. It was pre-internet; I really had to try to find my audiences by going out on tour. Men at Work really didn't build a foundational audience. We came in as a pop band with enormous radio success; once that goes away and the band breaks up the audience tends to go away with it. You're left with what you want to make of it. When you start out doing those tours, you start again [and] you tend not to attract a very big number of people. I'd play to a hundred people or sometimes less".

In December 2013, Hay announced on his website that he was done touring "for the time being" and would spend 2014 writing and recording.

In February 2015, Hay released his twelfth studio album, Next Year People. The album was preceded by the single "Trying to Get to You".

On 4 August 2015, Colin Hay: Waiting for my Real Life, a documentary film about Hay, debuted at the Melbourne International Film Festival.

On 27 January 2017, he released the first single, "A Thousand Million Reasons", from his thirteenth studio album Fierce Mercy, released in March 2017. Fierce Mercy debuted at number 44 on the ARIA chart, becoming his second solo chart entry in Australia. The album was promoted with his segments on Julia Zemiro's Home Delivery and Sunday Night.

Also in 2017, Hay released his first audiobook, Aesop's Fables with Colin Hay, published by Devault-Graves Digital Editions, for which he narrated 24 of Aesop's Fables written by author Tom Graves.

=== 2021–present: "Down Under" remix, and other successes ===
In August 2021, Hay released his fourteenth studio album, I Just Don't Know What to Do with Myself. The album features 10 versions of some of Hay's favourite songs from the Beatles (Norwegian Wood, Across the Universe) Blind Faith, Del Amitri, Dusty Springfield, Faces, Gerry and the Pacemakers (Don't Let the Sun Catch You Crying), Glen Campbell (Wichita Lineman), Jimmy Cliff (Many Rivers to Cross) and the Kinks (Waterloo Sunset).

In late 2021, Australian producer Christian "Luude" Benson (from the Tasmanian electronic dance music duo Choomba) remixed Men at Work's "Down Under" as a drum and bass track, with Hay re-recording the vocal for the track's release on the Sweat It Out record label. "Down Under" by Luude featuring Colin Hay charted at number 32 on the UK Singles chart on 7 January 2022 and at number 48 in Australia (ARIA Top 50 Singles for week of 10 January 2022).

Hay's fifteenth studio album, Now and the Evermore, was released on 18 March 2022.

In 2022, Australian rock band Lime Cordiale released their song "Colin" from their album Enough Of The Sweet Talk. Hay lends vocals to the song, and part of the music video was filmed at his house.

== Personal life ==
Hay is married to singer Cecilia Noël, who often provides backing vocals at his shows. Noël has also helped with production on Hay's solo studio albums. Hay said of his ninth solo studio album, Are You Lookin' at Me? (2007) that "She was really crucial. She was a really great sounding board for me. She's a really good producer in the sense that she's very musical and has a great sense of song structure and so forth. So she was great to bounce ideas off. And she sang on nearly all the songs. So she was really a great part of this record." Hay and Noël live in Topanga Canyon in the Los Angeles area.

On 13 February 2009, former Men at Work band member Ron Strykert was arrested for allegedly making death threats against Hay.

Hay became an American citizen in 2016. He also has a residence in St Kilda, Melbourne.

== Discography ==
- Looking for Jack (1987)
- Wayfaring Sons (1990)
- Peaks & Valleys (1992)
- Topanga (1994)
- Transcendental Highway (1998)
- Going Somewhere (2001)
- Company of Strangers (2002)
- Man @ Work (2003)
- Are You Lookin' at Me? (2007)
- American Sunshine (2009)
- Gathering Mercury (2011)
- Next Year People (2015)
- Fierce Mercy (2017)
- I Just Don't Know What to Do with Myself (2021)
- Now and the Evermore (2022)
- Man @ Work Vol. 2 (2025)

== Acting ==
After performing in Men at Work, Hay performed in a number of films and TV shows, usually in small roles.

Year	Film/Show	Role	Notes
1985	Wills & Burke	Publican	Australian black comedy film
1988	Raw Silk	Parker	Australian film
1994–95	Blue Heelers	Brad Fielding and George Patterson	2 episodes
1996	Cosi	Zac	Australian comedy-drama film
1997	JAG: Judge Advocate General	Miles	Episode – "Trinity"
1997	Heaven's Burning	Jonah	Australian crime film
1998	The Larry Sanders Show	himself	S6E2
1999	The Craic	Barry	Australian comedy film
1999	The Mick Molloy Show	Gary Builder and himself	S1E2 and S1E4
2002–2009	Scrubs		4 episodes
2006	The Wild	Fergus Flamingo (voice)	Cameo
2008	The Uninvited	Nick	American horror thriller film
2012	Jack Irish – Bad Debts	Tony Baker	Australian television drama series
2017	FishCenter Live	himself	
2018	The Resident	Rhys Barrett (musician)	S2E4
2022	A Million Little Things	himself	S4E16

== Awards and nominations ==
=== APRA Awards ===
The APRA Awards are presented annually from 1982 by the Australasian Performing Right Association (APRA), "honouring composers and songwriters".

Year	Nominee / work	Award	Result
2020	Colin Hay	Distinguished Services Award	awarded
2023	Colin Hay	Ted Albert Award for Outstanding Services to Australian Music	awarded

=== ARIA Music Awards ===
The ARIA Music Awards is an annual awards ceremony that recognises excellence, innovation, and achievement across all genres of Australian music. They commenced in 1987. Men at Work were inducted into the Hall of Fame in 1994.

Year	Nominee / work	Award	Result	Ref.
1994	(as a member of) Men at Work	ARIA Hall of Fame	Inductee	
1998	Transcendental Highway	Best Adult Contemporary Album	Nominated	
2011	Gathering Mercury	Best Adult Contemporary Album	Nominated	
2022	"Down Under" (Luude featuring Colin Hay)	Song of the Year	Nominated	
2022	"Down Under" (Luude featuring Colin Hay)	Best Dance / Electronic Release	Won	
2022	"Down Under" (featuring Colin Hay) (Luude, Peter Hume)	Best Video	Nominated	

=== Australian Songwriters Hall of Fame ===
The Australian Songwriters Hall of Fame was established in 2004 to honour the lifetime achievements of some of Australia's greatest songwriters.

Year	Nominee / work	Award	Result
2020	Colin Hay	Australian Songwriters Hall of Fame	inducted

=== Country Music Awards of Australia ===
The Country Music Awards of Australia is an annual awards night held in January during the Tamworth Country Music Festival. Celebrating recording excellence in the Australian country music industry. They commenced in 1973.

Year	Nominee / work	Award	Result	Ref.
2020	"Next Year People" (with Sara Storer)	Vocal Collaboration of the Year	Nominated	

=== Countdown Australian Music Awards ===
Countdown was an Australian pop music TV series on national broadcaster ABC-TV from 1974 to 1987, it presented music awards from 1979 to 1987, initially in conjunction with magazine TV Week. The TV Week / Countdown Awards were a combination of popular-voted and peer-voted awards.

Year	Nominee / work	Award	Result
1982	himself (Men at Work)	Best Songwriter	Nominated
1983	himself	Songwriter of the Year	Nominated
