= School of Fish =

American alternative rock band

- School of Fish, 1991. L-R: Michael Ward, Dominic Nardini, Michael Petrak, and Josh Clayton-Felt.

Background information
- Origin: Los Angeles, California
- Genres: Alternative rock, jangle pop
- Years active: 1989–1994, 2020
- Label: Capitol Records

School of Fish was an alternative rock band which formed in 1989 and disbanded in 1994. The core members were Josh Clayton-Felt (lead vocals and guitar) and Michael Ward (guitar). School of Fish released two albums and are remembered for the 1991 hit single "3 Strange Days".

== History ==
Clayton-Felt and Ward started as a duo who would play club dates in Los Angeles, California, accompanied by programmed drums and bass.

Recruiting drummer Michael Petrak and bassist David Lipson, the band signed with Capitol Records in 1990 and released their first single in the same year on 7-inch vinyl. Their self-titled debut was released in March 1991, followed by their first single, "3 Strange Days". Also during 1991, they appeared on a KROQ-FM concert disc called the Acoustic Christmas.

After the release of the first album, the rhythm section of Petrak and Nardini was replaced by Chad Fischer and Chris MacDonald, respectively. However the new members did not play on the band's second album, which featured session musicians Josh Freese and John Pierce. Nevertheless, Fischer stayed with the band to play live.

School of Fish's second album, Human Cannonball, was released in 1993. The album did not sell well and was not as successful as the self-titled album. Shortly thereafter, the band broke up.

== Aftermath ==
=== Members’ careers ===
Singer Josh Clayton-Felt embarked on a solo career and released two studio albums and one live album before he was diagnosed with cancer in 1999. He died on January 19, 2000, at the age of 32. His estate has since overseen three posthumous releases.

Guitarist Michael Ward went on to play with John Hiatt and eventually became a member of the Wallflowers. After the Wallflowers split, Ward spent many years as a member of Ben Harper's band, the Innocent Criminals. He was also a sought-after session guitarist in Los Angeles, and the author of the children's books Mike and the Bike and Mike and the Bike Meet Lucille The Wheel. Ward died on April 1, 2024.

Chad Fischer went on to form the band Lazlo Bane, known for the original theme song of the TV show Scrubs. He also established himself as a record producer and composer.

Christopher MacDonald, who played bass with the band on tour, but did not play on any School of Fish recordings, records synthesizer space music under the name Telomere.

Dominic Nardini is still a bass player and plays shows in New England.

=== Releases ===
Two previously unreleased songs were released as downloads circa 2007. "Broken Arm" (recorded before the Human Cannonball sessions) and "Goodbye Green World" (recorded before the self-titled album sessions).

The idea of releasing a rarities compilation was in talks with surviving past members but was aborted completely.

Two songs performed by Josh Clayton-Felt and Michael Ward, "Goodbye Green World" and "Who Am I Today", were issued on Clayton-Felt's third posthumous release, the EP The Spirit Shines Through.

In 2020 Chad Fischer reunited with the classic lineup of School of Fish—Ward, Nardini, and Petrak—to record a new version of the song "3 Strange Days", which was released as a video in tribute to Josh Clayton-Felt. The track was later included on the 2021 Lazlo Bane album Someday We'll Be Together.

== Members ==
- Josh Clayton-Felt – vocals, guitars (1989-1994: died 2000)
- Michael Ward – guitars, vocals (1989-1994, 2020: died 2024)
- David Lipson – bass (1989)
- Craig Aaronson – drums (1989)
- Dominic Nardini – bass, tambourine (1990-1991, 2020)
- Michael Petrak (a.k.a. M.P.) – drums (1990-1991, 2020)
- John Pierce – bass, cello (1992-1994)
- Josh Freese – drums (1992-1993, appears on Human Cannonball only)
- Chad Fischer – live drums (1991-1994) vocals, guitar (2020)
- Chris MacDonald – live bass (1991-1992)

== Discography ==
=== Studio albums ===
Year	Album	Chart peaks	
Year	Album	US	US Heat
1991	School of Fish	142	5
1993	Human Cannonball	-	16

=== Singles ===
Year	Title	Chart peaks		Album
Year	Title	US Mod	US Main	Album
1991	"3 Strange Days"	6	12	School of Fish
1993	"Take Me Anywhere"	5	-	Human Cannonball

Promotional Singles

Year	Single	Album
1991	"Wrong"	School of Fish
1991	"King of the Dollar"	School of Fish
1993	"Jump Off the World"	Human Cannonball
1993	"Everyword"	Human Cannonball

=== Promotional EPs ===
Year	Title	Content
1991	The Wrong Sampler	The five-track EP features 4 previously unreleased songs, 3 originals by Josh Clayton-Felt and Michael Ward ("The Greatest Living Englishman", "The Turtle Song", "Disconnected") and The Kinks cover "This is Where I Belong". The fifth track is radio edit of "Wrong" from School of Fish.
1991	Live in L.A.	The six-track EP features 5 exclusive live songs and the song "King of the Dollar" from School of Fish.

=== Other appearances ===
Year	Title	Album
2021	"3 Strange Days" (with Lazlo Bane)	Someday We'll Be Together

=== Music videos ===
Year	Song	Director(s)	Album
1991	"3 Strange Days"	Kevin Kerslake	School of Fish
1991	"King of the Dollar"		School of Fish
1993	"Take Me Anywhere"	Kevin Kerslake	Human Cannonball

== In media ==
- "Rose Colored Glasses" appears in the 1991 film Point Break
- "3 Strange Days" appears in the 1990 film Reversal of Fortune
