= Michael Ward (musician) =

American guitarist (1967–2024)

- Born: February 21, 1967; Minneapolis, Minnesota, U.S.
- Died: April 1, 2024 (aged 57)
- Genres: Rock, alternative rock, blues, gypsy punk, country, folk
- Occupations: Musician, producer, songwriter
- Instrument: Guitar
- Years active: 1989–2024
- Labels: Capitol; Interscope
- Formerly of: School of Fish, The Wallflowers, Gogol Bordello
- Website: www.wardworldwide.com

Michael Ward (February 21, 1967 – April 1, 2024) was an American guitarist from Minneapolis, Minnesota, who was best known as a member of the 1990s alternative rock group The Wallflowers.

== Biography ==
Ward was born in Minneapolis in 1967. He was a founding member of the early 1990s alternative rock band School of Fish on Capitol Records, his unique tone provided the underpinning hook for the band’s hit single "3 Strange Days".

Michael's innovative approach to the guitar has captured the attention of several producers such as Matt Wallace (Faith No More, Maroon 5, Deftones, R.E.M) and Mark Endert (Madonna, Train, Miley Cyrus) leading to over 50 studio album recordings throughout his 35-year career.

With Matt Wallace, Ward recorded the John Hiatt album Perfectly Good Guitar, including the hit title track. Along with Mark Endert, he recorded the Gavin DeGraw album Chariot, which featured the smash hit "I Don’t Wanna Be".

In 1995, Ward was approached by Jakob Dylan to join The Wallflowers and record the album Bringing Down the Horse, selling over 5 million copies and earning Michael a Grammy Award for "One Headlight" in the category of Best Rock Performance by a Duo or Group with vocal.

Following the Wallflowers, Ward joined Ben Harper as one of the Innocent Criminals, contributing to Both Sides of The Gun, Lifeline, Call It What It Is, along with Ben Harper and The Blind Boys of Alabama, where he earned an NAACP Image Award as Outstanding Gospel Artist for the album There Will Be a Light.

Ward played in over 50 countries worldwide. When not touring, he resided in Los Angeles, playing as a studio session musician and guitar instructor.

In 1995 he played guitar for Adam Ant (an acoustic version of his song "Wonderful") on the Howard Stern radio show.

On April 1, 2024, Michael Ward died at the age of 57 due to complications from diabetes. His sister Tracy Ward Hartfiel announced his death on Facebook, stating, “Michael Ward has left this plane. It’s with tremendous sorrow that I let you know complications from diabetes took his life last night.” The news was later confirmed by the Wallflowers on their official Facebook page, where they shared a tribute to Ward, expressing their love and gratitude for his contributions to the band.

== Discography ==
Year	Album details	Band	Notes
1991	School of Fish: Released: April 1, 1991; Label: Capitol	School of Fish	
1993	Human Cannonball: Released: 1993; Label: Capitol	School of Fish	
1993	Perfectly Good Guitar: Released: September 7, 1993; Label: A&M	John Hiatt	
1994	Hiatt Comes Alive at Budokan?: Released: November 22, 1994; Label: A&M	John Hiatt	
1996	Bringing Down the Horse: Released: May 21, 1996; Label: Interscope	The Wallflowers	4× Platinum
2000	(Breach): Released: September 26, 2000; Label: Interscope	The Wallflowers	US: Gold
2006	Both Sides of the Gun: Released: March 21, 2006; Label: Virgin	Ben Harper	
2007	Lifeline: Released: August 28, 2007; Label: EMI	Ben Harper	
2013	The Blessed Unrest: Released: July 16, 2013; Label: Epic	Sara Bareilles	
2016	Call It What It Is: Released: April 8, 2016; Label: Stax	Ben Harper	Co-producer
