= I Wanna Go Backwards =

2007 box set by Robyn Hitchcock

Compilation album by Robyn Hitchcock
- Released: November 13, 2007
- Genre: Rock
- Label: Yep Roc Records

Professional ratings
Review scores
Source	Rating
Allmusic	link
The A.V. Club	A

I Wanna Go Backwards is a Robyn Hitchcock box set released in 2007 on Yep Roc Records. The set contains reissues of three of Hitchcock's albums, each with bonus tracks, and also a two-disc rarities set, While Thatcher Mauled Britain. The set consists of five CDs, and was also released as a limited edition of eight vinyl LPs.

== Disc 1 — Black Snake Dîamond Röle ==
The first disc of the set consists of Hitchcock's first album, Black Snake Dîamond Röle, originally released in 1981. Tracks 1–10 comprise the original album, and tracks 11–18 are bonus tracks.

1. "The Man Who Invented Himself"
2. "Brenda's Iron Sledge"
3. "Do Policemen Sing?"
4. "The Lizard"
5. "Meat"
6. "Acid Bird"
7. "I Watch The Cars"
8. "Out of the Picture"
9. "City of Shame"
10. "Love"
11. "All I Wanna Do is Fall in Love"
12. "A Skull, a Suitcase & a Long Red Bottle of Wine"
13. "It Was The Night"
14. "I Watch The Cars No. 2"
15. "Give Me a Spanner Ralph"
16. "It's a Mystic Trip"
17. "Grooving On a Inner Plane"
18. "Happy The Golden Prince"

== Disc 2 — I Often Dream of Trains ==
The second disc contains Hitchcock's third album, I Often Dream of Trains, originally released in 1984. Tracks 1–14 comprise the original album, and tracks 15–24 are bonus tracks.

1. "Nocturne (prelude)"
2. "Sometimes I Wish I Was a Pretty Girl"
3. "Cathedral"
4. "Uncorrected Personality Traits"
5. "Sounds Great When You're Dead"
6. "Flavour of Light"
7. "Ye Sleeping Nights of Jesus"
8. "This Could Be The Day"
9. "Trams of Old London"
10. "Furry Green Atom Bowl"
11. "Heart Full of Leaves"
12. "Autumn Is Your Last Chance"
13. "I Often Dream of Trains"
14. "Nocturne (Demise)"
15. "Winter Love"
16. "The Bones in the Ground"
17. "My Favourite Buildings"
18. "I Used To Say I Love You"
19. "Chant/Aether"
20. "Heart Full of Leaves" (Alternate)
21. "I Often Dream of Trains" (Demo)
22. "Not Even a Nurse"
23. "Slow Chant/That's Fantastic Mother Church"
24. "Traveller's Fare"

== Disc 3 — Eye ==
The third disc contains Hitchcock's 1990 album, Eye. Tracks 1–17 comprise the original CD version of the album, and tracks 18–21 are bonus tracks. The original CD release also contained a track called "College of Ice", which is instead included on disc 5 of I Wanna Go Backwards.

1. "Cynthia Mask"
2. "Certainly Cliquot"
3. "Queen Elvis"
4. "Flesh Cartoons"
5. "Chinese Water Python"
6. "Executioner"
7. "Linctus House"
8. "Sweet Ghost of Light"
9. "Transparent Lover"
10. "Beautiful Girl"
11. "Clean Steve"
12. "Raining Twilight Coast"
13. "Agony of Pleasure"
14. "Glass Hotel"
15. "Satellite"
16. "Aquarium"
17. "Queen Elvis II"
18. "Century"
19. "Shimmering Distant Love"
20. "Lovers Turn to Skulls"
21. "The Beauty of Earl's Court"

== Disc 4 — While Thatcher Mauled Britain ==
Disc 4 is a rarities disc compiled for this set.

1. "She Reached for a Light"
2. "August Hair"
3. "Take Your Knife Out Of My Back"
4. "Fiend Before The Shrine"
5. "Raymond Chandler Evening"
6. "Birdshead"
7. "Victorian Squid"
8. "You've Got"
9. "Captain Dry"
10. "Raining Twilight Coast" (Demo)
11. "Point It at Gran"
12. "Vegetable Friend"
13. "Flesh Number 1"
14. "Surgery"
15. "I Got a Message For You"
16. "If I Could Look"
17. "Parachutes & Jellyfish"
18. "Queen Elvis" (Demo)
19. "Nothing"
20. "Stranded in the Future"
21. "Melting Arthur"
22. "The Abandoned Brain"
23. "You're So Repulsive"
24. "Opiatrescence"

== Disc 5 — While Thatcher Mauled Britain ==
Disc 5 is a second disc of rarities compiled for this set.

1. "September Cones"
2. "Lovely Golden Villains"
3. "Dr Sticky" (live)
4. "Toadboy"
5. "Trash"
6. "Pit of Souls" (Country Version)
7. "Mr Deadly"
8. "Let There Be More Darkness"
9. "Listening To The Higsons"
10. "College of Ice"
11. "My Favourite Buildings" (Demo)
12. "Lightplug"
13. "Sleeping Knights of Jesus" (Demo)
14. "Insect Mother"
15. "I Wanna Go Backwards"

== Sources ==
- https://web.archive.org/web/20080229012450/http://store.yeproc.com/album.php?id=12810
- https://web.archive.org/web/20080406022114/http://www.pitchforkmedia.com/article/news/46008-robyn-hitchcock-looks-ibackwardi-on-retrospective
