= Spooked (album) =

2004 album by Robyn Hitchcock

Studio album by Robyn Hitchcock
- Released: October 5, 2004
- Recorded: 2004
- Studio: Woodland (Nashville, Tennessee)
- Label: Yep Roc
- Producer: David Rawlings

Robyn Hitchcock chronology
Luxor (2003)	Spooked (2004)	Olé! Tarantula (2006)

Professional ratings
Review scores
Source	Rating
AllMusic	4/5 stars
Pitchfork	7.2/10

Spooked is the fourteenth studio album by Robyn Hitchcock. It was recorded in collaboration with Gillian Welch and David Rawlings at Woodland Studio in Nashville, Tennessee in 2004, and released later that year. The set comprises twelve new recordings, all Hitchcock compositions with the exception of "Tryin' to Get to Heaven Before They Close the Door", a cover of a Bob Dylan song.

The tracks revisit Hitchcock's 1980s style, containing in their lyrics portrayals of several eccentric characters, surreal situations and scenarios, and several references to death, one of Hitchcock's most enduring themes. The packaging too is retrospective, its green and yellow packaging falling in line with previous solo-acoustic albums such as Eye and Moss Elixir. The painting on the front is a detail from one of Hitchcock's own, featuring an enlarged cat-like creature looming from behind a wall.

Hitchcock dedicates the album to 'The Dark Princess', using the title of a track from 1999's Jewels for Sophia as a pseudonym for his partner Michele Noach.

== Track listing ==
All songs by Robyn Hitchcock except where noted

1. "Television" – 6:22
2. "If You Know Time" – 3:32
3. "Everybody Needs Love" – 3:17
4. "English Girl" – 3:21
5. "Demons and Fiends" – 2:14
6. "Creeped Out" – 3:15
7. "Sometimes a Blonde" – 4:53
8. "We're Gonna Live in the Trees" – 3:24
9. "Tryin' to Get to Heaven Before They Close the Door" (Bob Dylan) – 6:00
10. "Full Moon in My Soul" – 3:02
11. "Welcome to Earth" – 0:49
12. "Flanagan's Song" – 4:39
