= Robyn Hitchcock (disambiguation) =

Robyn Hitchcock is an English singer-songwriter and guitarist.

Robyn Hitchcock may also refer to:

- Robyn Hitchcock (1995 album), a compilation album by Robyn Hitchcock
- Robyn Hitchcock (2017 album), a studio album by Robyn Hitchcock
