= Greatest Hits (Robyn Hitchcock and The Egyptians album) =

1996 compilation album by Robyn Hitchcock and the Egyptians

Greatest hits album by Robyn Hitchcock
- Released: 1996
- Recorded: 1988–1992
- Genre: Alternative rock
- Label: A&M

Greatest Hits is a collection of material by Robyn Hitchcock and the Egyptians from the A&M period 1988–1992, spanning the albums Globe of Frogs, Queen Elvis, Perspex Island, and Respect.

The collection also includes various hard-to-find B-Sides, which acted as a strong selling point for Hitchcock's fans, including Legalized Murder, Ruling Class, Dark Green Energy and Bright Fresh Flower. In addition, two cover songs are included – Bryan Ferry's More Than This and a live recording of the Byrds' Eight Miles High.

It was released as part of A&M's Backlot Digital Remasters Series on September 9, 1996.

== Track listing ==
1. Balloon Man 03:34
2. Vibrating 03:01
3. Flesh Number One (Beatle Dennis) 02:40
4. A Globe of Frogs (electric version) 04:29 (B-side for Balloon Man single 1988)
5. Legalized Murder 04:08 (B-side for Flesh Number One (Beatle Dennis) single 1988)
6. Intro to "Eyes" 02:44 live intro to One Long Pair of Eyes. (Excerpt from Madonna of the Wasps EP 1989)
7. One Long Pair Of Eyes 04:59
8. Madonna Of The Wasps 03:06
9. Wax Doll 04:14
10. More Than This 03:52 (by Bryan Ferry) (From Madonna of the Wasps EP 1989)
11. Ruling Class 03:25 (B-Side for Madonna of the Wasps single, 1989)
12. So You Think You're In Love 02:35
13. Oceanside 03:45
14. Ride 05:01
15. She Doesn't Exist 04:26
16. Dark Green Energy 03:14 (B-side for So You Think You're In Love single 1991)
17. Eight Miles High 03:58 (by Clark, David Crosby and McGuinn) (from So You Think You're In Love CD single)
18. Driving Aloud (Radio Storm) 04:00
19. The Yip Song 03:08
20. Alright, Yeah 02:57 (B-side for Driving Aloud single 1992)
21. Bright Fresh Flower 03:22 (B-side for The Yip Song single 1992)

All songs by Robyn Hitchcock except where indicated.
