= Uncorrected Personality Traits =

1997 compilation album by Robyn Hitchcock

Compilation album by Robyn Hitchcock
- Released: 1997
- Genre: Alternative rock
- Label: Rhino

Uncorrected Personality Traits is a compilation album by Robyn Hitchcock, released in 1997 on Rhino Records. Following A&M's 1996 Greatest Hits, this compilation was assembled from earlier, pre-A&M recordings, spanning 1981 to 1995 and selected personally by Hitchcock.

There are no previously unreleased tracks on the collection, and the title itself comes from one of his early solo recordings, made as an a cappella psycho-analytic comedy number for I Often Dream Of Trains.

The album includes three instrumentals and mixes solo work with tracks recorded by Robyn Hitchcock & The Egyptians in the 1980s.

== Track listing ==
1. Bass
2. Fifty Two Stations
3. Acid Bird
4. Egyptian Cream
5. Uncorrected Personality Traits
6. Heart Full Of Leaves
7. The Man With The Lightbulb Head
8. Queen Elvis II
9. She Reached For A Light
10. Airscape
11. My Wife And My Dead Wife (Live Version)
12. Night Ride To Trinidad
13. Raymond Chandler Evening
14. Linctus House
15. Beautiful Girl
16. Heaven
17. If You Were A Priest
18. Autumn Is Your Last Chance
19. City Of Shame
20. Nocturne (Demise)
