= Mossy Liquor =

1996 outtakes album by Robyn Hitchcock

Compilation album by Robyn Hitchcock
- Released: 1996

Robyn Hitchcock chronology
Moss Elixir (1996)	Mossy Liquor (1996)	Jewels for Sophia (1999)

Mossy Liquor is the title of a vinyl LP released by Robyn Hitchcock in 1996. The album preceded the release of the Moss Elixir CD by a few weeks, and half of it was made up of demos or alternative versions of the Moss Elixir material.

Opening with a Swedish language rendition of "Alright, Yeah", side one also features four all new tracks, including the instrumental "Shuffling over the Flagstones", the casual "Cool Bug Rumble", and two particularly strong songs in "Wide Open Star" and "Each of Her Silver Wands", the latter remade several years later by a reunited Soft Boys line up.

The rest of the new material includes "As Lemons Chop" and the archaeological comedy "Trilobite", rounded off with a previously unheard and untitled guitar instrumental acting as an extended coda to the demo version of "Heliotrope".

The sleeve was created by switching the front and back images from Moss Elixir.

== Track listing ==
1. "Alright, Yeah" (in Swedish)
2. "Beautiful Queen" (Demo)
3. "Shuffling over the Flagstones"
4. "Cool Bug Rumble"
5. "Wide Open Star"
6. "Each of Her Silver Wands"
7. "DeChirico Street" (Demo)
8. "As Lemons Chop"
9. "Sinister but She Was Happy" (Demo)
10. "Trilobite"
11. "The Devil's Radio" (Demo)
12. "Heliotrope" (Demo)
