= Robyn Hitchcock (1995 album) =

1995 compilation album by Robyn Hitchcock

Compilation album by Robyn Hitchcock
- Released: 1995
- Genre: Alternative rock
- Label: Sequel Records

Robyn Hitchcock was the first official collection of pre-released Robyn Hitchcock material, issued in 1995 by Sequel Records.

This little-noted compilation was worthy of particular attention, being the only Hitchcock album to include the studio recording "Statue With a Walkman", a humorous depiction of a haemoglobin-counting figure found resting at the bottom of a garden. (Hitchcock would re-write the song with new sections, for the Storefront Hitchcock project a few years later.). This recording ended up on Shadow Cat in slightly edited form in 2008 (shortened by 63 seconds), making this compilation much less desirable.

The rest of the CD includes titles from his 1980s albums, nine of which had recently undergone repackaging and re-release. There is one title pulled from each, and the insert to this CD advertises and illustrates them all.

== Track listing ==
1. "City of Shame"
2. "Night Ride to Trinidad"
3. "Heartful of Leaves"
4. "I'm Only You"
5. "Listening to the Higsons"
6. "Airscape"
7. "I Got a Message for You"
8. "Queen Elvis III"
9. "Surgery"
10. "Statue with a Walkman"

Notes: "Queen Elvis III" is actually "Queen Elvis II".

"Heartful Of Leaves" is listed as coming from Fegmania! instead of I Often Dream Of Trains.
