= Give It to the Thoth Boys – Live Oddities =

1993 live album by Robyn Hitchcock and the Egyptians

Give It To The Thoth Boys - Live Oddities

Live album by Robyn Hitchcock and the Egyptians
- Released: 1993
- Recorded: 1991, 1992
- Genre: Rock
- Length: 48.00
- Label: BL1
- Producer: Andy Metcalfe

Robyn Hitchcock and the Egyptians chronology
Respect (1993)	Give It To The Thoth Boys - Live Oddities (1993)	The Kershaw Sessions (1994)

Give It to the Thoth Boys – Live Oddities is a live recording of Robyn Hitchcock and the Egyptians recorded in 1991 and 1992 at various locations. It was released on cassette only and sold on the Respect tour in 1993. It was compiled by Andy Metcalfe from soundboard tapes done by the band themselves. There is a companion cassette released of the reformed Soft Boys tour called "Where Are The Prawns?".

== Track listing ==
All songs written by Robyn Hitchcock, except *.

=== Side One ===
1. "Egyptian Cream" (Tempe '92)
2. "My Wife & My Dead Wife" (Dallas '92)
3. "Clean Steve" (Tempe '92)
4. "Glass Hotel" (Minneapolis '92)
5. "When I Was Dead" (NY '92)
6. "City of Shame" (NY '92)

=== Side Two ===
1. "Only the Stones Remain" (NY '92)
2. "The Live-In Years" (LA '92)
3. "Globe of Frogs" (San Francisco '92)
4. "Somewhere Apart" (London '91)
5. "Freeze" (London '91)
6. "A Day in the Life" (Dallas '92) *

== Personnel ==
- Robyn Hitchcock - vocals, guitar
- Andy Metcalfe - bass, keyboards, vocals
- Morris Windsor - drums, vocals
