= Luminous Groove =

2008 box set by Robyn Hitchcock and the Egyptians

Box set by Robyn Hitchcock and the Egyptians
- Released: August 19, 2008
- Recorded: 1984–86
- Genre: Rock
- Label: YepRoc
- Producer: Robyn Hitchcock; Andy Metcalfe

Professional ratings
Review scores
Source	Rating
AllMusic	4.5/5 stars

Luminous Groove is a 2008 compilation box set of the albums Fegmania! (March 1985), Gotta Let This Hen Out (October 1985) and Element of Light (1986) by Robyn Hitchcock and the Egyptians. The box set was issued on CD and vinyl. The versions included in the CD box set are the extended reissues from YepRoc. The set also includes 2 discs of B-sides and rarities called Bad Case of History. (The vinyl set had all the extra tracks from the extended CDs removed. These were re-assembled onto three LPs, with another two LPs of B-sides and rarities, as per the CD set.)

== Track list ==
=== Disc One: Fegmania! ===
- Recorded at Alaska Studios
1. "Egyptian Cream"
2. "Another Bubble"
3. "I'm Only You"
4. "My Wife and My Dead Wife"
5. "Goodnight I Say"
6. "The Man With the Lightbulb Head"
7. "Insect Mother"
8. "Strawberry Mind"
9. "Glass"
10. "The Fly"
11. "Heaven"
12. "(untitled)"
13. "Bells of Rhymney"
14. "Some Body"
15. "Heaven"
16. "The Pit of Souls"
17. "The Drowning Church"
18. "The Man With the Lightbulb Head (instrumental)"
19. "Lady Obvious"

=== Disc Two: Gotta Let This Hen Out ===
- Recorded live April 27, 1985, The Marquee, London
1. "Sometimes I Wish I Was a Pretty Girl"
2. "Kingdom of Love"
3. "Acid Bird"
4. "The Cars She Used to Drive"
5. "My Wife and My Dead Wife"
6. "Brenda's Iron Sledge"
7. "The Fly"
8. "Only the Stones Remain"
9. "Egyptian Cream"
10. "Leppo and the Jooves"
11. "America"
12. "Heaven"
13. "Listening to the Higsons"
14. "The Face of Death"
15. "If You Were a Priest"
16. "Freeze"
17. "I'm Only You"
18. "Unsettled"
19. Egyptian Cream #2

=== Disc Three: Element of Light ===
1. "If You Were a Priest"
2. "Winchester"
3. "Somewhere Apart"
4. "Ted, Woody and Junior"
5. "The President"
6. "Raymond Chandler Evening"
7. "Bass"
8. "Airscape"
9. "Never Stop Bleeding"
10. "Lady Waters and the Hooded One"
11. "The Black Crow Knows"
12. "The Crawling"
13. "The Leopard"
14. "Tell Me About Your Drugs"
15. "Sprinkling Dots"
16. "Upside-Down Church Blues"
17. "Into It"
18. "Neck"
19. "Bass" (Demo)
20. "Lady Waters and the Hooded One" (remix)

=== Disc Four: Bad Case of History Disc 1 ===
1. "Bad Case of History"
2. "In Agony of Pleasure"
3. "Poisonous Angel"
4. "Live Man Die"
5. "Furry Baby"
6. "Evil Guy"
7. "Hangin' Out With Dad"
8. "Wild Mountain Thyme"
9. "Ivy Alone"
10. "I Am Not Me"
11. "Surfer Ghost"
12. "Beautiful Queen"
13. "Testosterone Blues"
14. "Zipper In My Spine"
15. "Lost Tribes"

=== Disc Five: Bad Case of History Disc 2 ===
1. "Child of the Universe"
2. "Freeze"
3. "Veins of the Queen"
4. "The Ruling Class"
5. "So You Think You're In Love"
6. "Driving Aloud"
7. "Wax Doll"
8. "The Living Years"
9. "Eight Miles High"
10. "Chimes of Freedom"
11. "Railway Shoes"
12. "Arms of Love"
13. "The Moon Inside"
14. "Globe of Frogs"
15. "Vegetation and Dimes"
16. "Wafflehead"
17. "The Wreck of the Arthur Lee"
