= Propellor Time =

2010 studio album by Robyn Hitchcock & the Venus 3

Studio album by Robyn Hitchcock & the Venus 3
- Released: 22 March 2010
- Recorded: 2006
- Studios: Figaro Plinth; Stwdio Penty; Gravity Shack
- Length: 40:20
- Label: Sartorial

Robyn Hitchcock chronology
Goodnight Oslo (2009)	Propellor Time (2010)	Tromsø, Kaptein (2011)

Propellor Time is the seventeenth studio album by Robyn Hitchcock, the third and last recorded with the Venus 3 (Peter Buck of R.E.M., Scott McCaughey of Young Fresh Fellows and Bill Rieflin of Ministry and R.E.M.). It was released on 22 March 2010 via Sartorial Records.

Additionally, an array of guest musicians collaborated with Hitchcock on Propellor Time; selected tracks feature contributions (some dating back to the Olé! Tarantula era) from John Paul Jones, Johnny Marr, Nick Lowe and former Soft Boys/Egyptians bandmate Morris Windsor.

Different versions of "The Afterlight", "Luckiness" and "Sickie Boy" had appeared on previous releases. Outtakes from the Propellor Time recording sessions are available on tracks 2, 5, 6 and 12 of the 2010 Hitchcock rarities compilation, Trolley Bus 2.

== Critical reception ==
Professional ratings
Aggregate scores
Source	Rating
Metacritic	75/100
Review scores
Source	Rating
AllMusic	4.5/5 stars
Classic Rock	7/10 stars
Under the Radar	7/10

According to the review aggregator Metacritic, Propellor Time received "generally favorable reviews" based on a weighted average score of 75 out of 100 from 7 critic scores.

== Track listing ==
All tracks are written by Robyn Hitchcock, except where noted.

Propellor Time track listing
No.	Title	Music	Length
1.	"Star of Venus"		4:21
2.	"The Afterlight"		3:51
3.	"Luckiness"		3:13
4.	"Ordinary Millionaire"	Johnny Marr	3:52
5.	"John in the Air"		2:56
6.	"Propellor Time"	Peter Buck	5:13
7.	"Primitive"		3:42
8.	"Sickie Boy"		3:59
9.	"Born on the Wind"		5:15
10.	"Evolove"		3:58
Total length:			40:20

== Personnel ==
Credits are adapted from the CD liner notes.

=== Robyn Hitchcock & the Venus 3 ===
- Robyn Hitchcock – lead vocals, guitar, harmonica, keyboards
- Peter Buck – 12-string electric guitar, 6-string acoustic guitar
- Scott McCaughey – bass, vocals
- Bill Rieflin – drums

=== Additional musicians ===
- Chris Ballew – acoustic guitar, vocal harmonies (tracks 1, 2, 10); piano (5), electric guitar (6)
- Nick Lowe – vocal harmonies (1, 2, 8)
- Morris Windsor – vocal harmonies (1, 2, 8)
- Neill MacColl – banjo (2, 3)
- John Paul Jones – mandolin (3, 10)
- Ruby Wright – musical saw (3, 10)
- Kate St John – cor anglais (4), treated accordion (7)
- Johnny Marr – electric guitar, acoustic guitar (4)
- Charlie Francis – Mellotron (10)

=== Technical and design ===
- Charlie Francis – recording at Figaro Plinth, mixing and overdubbing at Stwdio Penty
- Jessica Corcoran – additional recording at Gravity Shack
- Chris Wainwright – cover photographs
- Michele Noach – other photograph, back cover, sleeve design
- Robyn Hitchcock – sleeve design
- Manny Thanks – sleeve design
