= The Kershaw Sessions =

The Kershaw Sessions is the name of several albums based on sessions done for the radio DJ Andy Kershaw including:

- The Kershaw Sessions (Robyn Hitchcock album), an album by Robyn Hitchcock and the Egyptians released in 1994, comprising nineteen titles recorded live between 1985 and 1991
- The Kershaw Sessions: Live at the BBC, an album by Ted Hawkins released in 2000, comprising titles recorded live 1986–1989
- The Kershaw Sessions (Martin Carthy), an album by Martin Carthy released in 1994, comprising titles recorded live in 1987 and 1988
