= Tim Keegan =

British musician

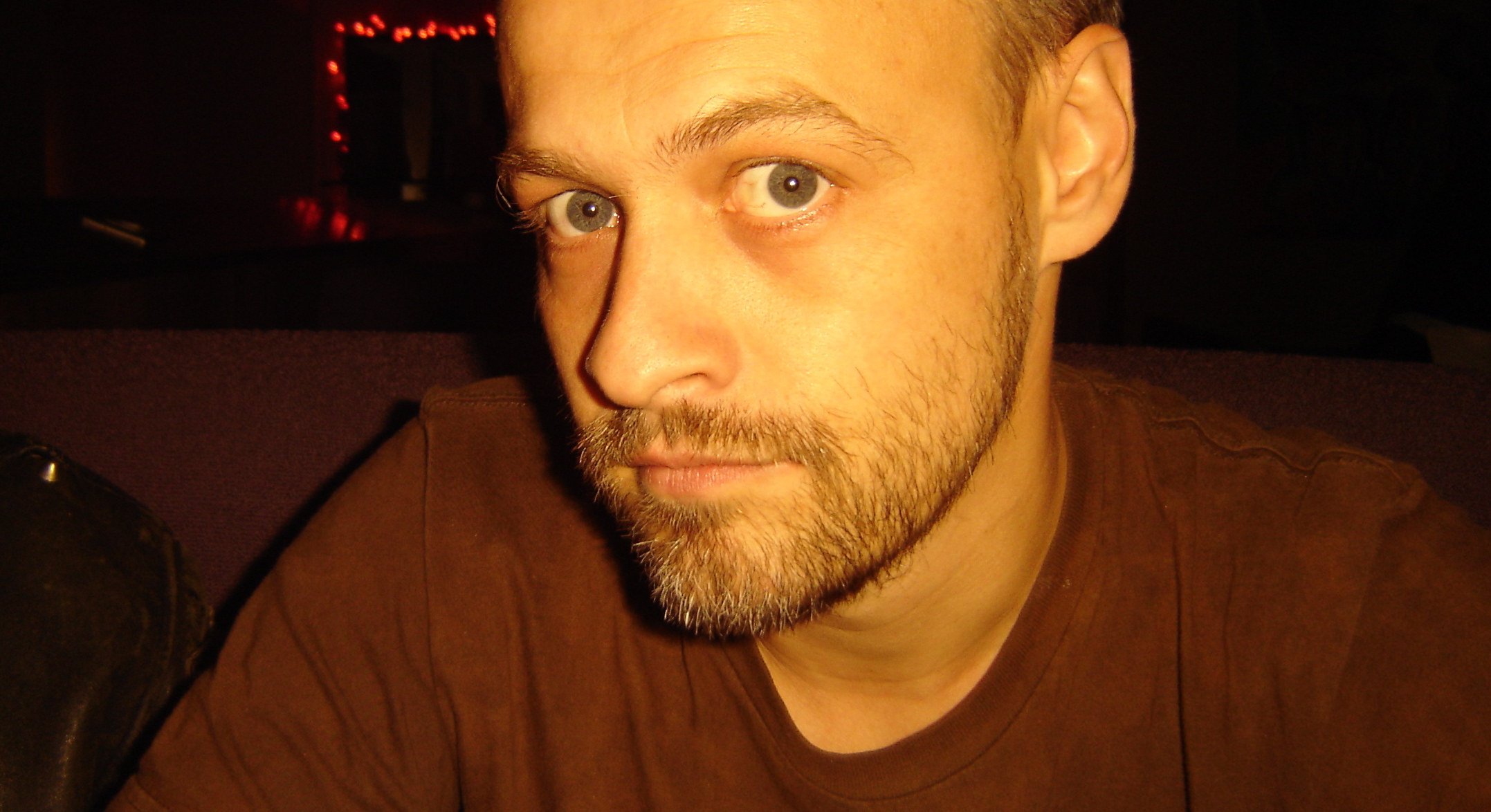
Tim Keegan at the Jazz Café London

Tim Keegan is an English musician. Vocalist and principal songwriter with Departure Lounge since 1999, Keegan has recorded and performed with various bands and as a solo artist. He has worked with a number of musicians including Robyn Hitchcock; he can be seen in Jonathan Demme's film about Hitchcock, Storefront Hitchcock – and played guitar on the Blue Aeroplanes' Rough Music album.

== Biography ==
Keegan's first band was Railroad Earth, formed in 1988 in Guildford, Surrey. Keegan sang and played rhythm guitar. The other members in the original line-up were Duncan Smith (vocals and guitar), Liz Waller (piano and keyboards) and David Ashford (bass guitar).

In 1992, Railroad Earth changed their name to Ringo and released their only album, Call It Home. The other members of Ringo were Patrick Ranscombe (lead guitar), Andy Prins (bass guitar) and Graham Russell (drums). The album was recorded by alt-rock producer Gary Smith at his Fort Apache Studios. The album was released on Dog Gone Records, a label owned and run by REM's former manager Jefferson Holt. Two singles were released from the record, "Cuckoo" and "Railroad Earth".

Ringo split up in 1994 and Keegan continued to work solo and in combination with a number of other musicians. His first post-Ringo band was Homer, consisting of Keegan, Patrick Hannan (of The Sundays), Andy Metcalfe (of the Soft Boys and Robyn Hitchcock and the Egyptians), Jake Kyle and Andrew Claridge. Homer released two singles in 1995, "Lucky Thirteen" and "Superkeen". During this period, the band served as the backing band for Robyn Hitchcock, and played on several of the tracks on Hitchcock's Moss Elixir album. Additionally, the band toured with Hitchcock, and played small dates throughout the south of England in the summer of 1995. The shows typically featured an opening Homer set, followed by a Robyn Hitchcock set. During the late 1990s, both Tim Keegan and Jake Kyle accompanied Hitchcock, including the 1997 and 1998 fan shows.

Keegan's next group formation recorded under the name Tim Keegan & the Homer Lounge and featured Keegan (vocals and guitar), Jake Kyle (bass guitar), Daron Robinson Drugstore (lead guitar) and Lindsay Jamieson (drums and keyboards). Tim Keegan & the Homer Lounge released two CD EPs (Disconnected and Save Me From Happiness) and a US only mini-album on CD (Long Distance Information). Most of the tracks on these releases were subsequently released under the name Tim Keegan & Departure Lounge.

Keegan's next and most critically successful band was Departure Lounge. Departure Lounge featured Keegan (vocals and guitar), Jake Kyle (bass guitar), Chris Anderson (piano, keyboards and guitar) and Lindsay Jamieson (drums). Keegan, with Departure Lounge, supported Robyn Hitchcock on a US tour in 1999. Departure Lounge released three albums: Out Of Here on their own Meek Giant label in 1999 (the US version, Out Of There (Flydaddy, 2000), featured a revised track listing), the instrumental album Jetlag Dreams (Bella Union/Naive, 2001) and the Kid Loco-produced Too Late To Die Young (Bella Union/Naive/Nettwerk, 2002). These albums all received warm critical praise. Too Late To Die Young was made Album of the Week on BBC 6 Music.

Departure Lounge disbanded in 2003 and since then Keegan has worked on solo projects and has also appeared as guest vocalist on other artists' releases.

His first solo album, Foreign Domestic (recorded in Nashville, Paris and London) was released in 2007, receiving positive reviews in the British and French press. His cover version of the Destiny's Child song "Survivor" appeared on the compilation albums La musique de Paris Dernière 4 in France and Tory Burch Foundation: Volume 1 in the US.

Keegan continued to perform with Hitchcock into the 2000s, including on tours reviving his I Often Dream of Trains album, appearing in John Edgington's live performance film I Often Dream Of Trains In New York, which was released as a DVD and CD in 2009.

A second solo album, The Long Game (Label Of Love), was released in the UK in 2015 and featured Hitchcock on the track "Trouble Again".

Jetlag Dreams was re-issued on limited edition clear vinyl by Bella Union for Record Store Day in 2016.

in September 2019 Departure Lounge reunited for live shows in Worthing, Brighton and London to celebrate the twentieth anniversary of Out Of Here .

In March 2021, Departure Lounge released their fourth album, Transmeridian (Violette Records), featuring R.E.M. guitarist Peter Buck on the single, "Australia".

Keegan lives in the UK on the West Sussex coast, with his wife and two children.

== Discography ==
with Ringo

- Call It Home (Dog Gone Records, 1993)

Solo

- Foreign Domestic (Label of Love, 2007)
- The Long Game(Meek Giant, 2015)
