= Live at the Cambridge Folk Festival =

1998 live album by Robyn Hitchcock and the Egyptians

Live album by Robyn Hitchcock & The Egyptians
- Released: 1998
- Recorded: 1992
- Genre: Alternative rock

Live At The Cambridge Folk Festival is a 1998 album by Robyn Hitchcock & The Egyptians, containing live recordings from the Cambridge Folk Festival of Hitchcock's back catalogue.

Hitchcock hails from the city of Cambridge and has made several appearances at the city's annual festival, this particular recording dating to 1992. The Asking Tree dates the appearance as circa Fri., 31 July 1992.

The CD includes ten tracks, from different stages of Hitchcock's solo career, most of which do not differ substantially from the original recordings, but for the fact that they feature acoustic guitars in place of electric as a consequence of the festival's folk theme. (None could rightly be termed folk music, however.)

Only "Satellite" is radically different from the original, filled out here with a full band arrangement in contrast to the minimal reading on Hitchcock's solo album Eye.

Hitchcock provides sleeve notes, and the track listing below conforms to that stated on the CD cover, which is not sequenced in accordance with the disc's contents.

== Track listing ==
1. "So You Think You're in Love"
2. "Driving Aloud"
3. "Uncorrected Personality Traits"
4. "Satellite"
5. "Birds in Perspex"
6. "Railway Shoes"
7. "The Yip! Song"
8. "Egyptian Cream"
9. "Globe of Frogs"
10. "Oceanside"

== Sources ==
- "Official Robyn Hitchcock website". Archived from the original on 12 October 1999.
