= A Star for Bram =

2000 outtakes album by Robyn Hitchcock

Studio album by Robyn Hitchcock
- Released: 2000
- Genre: Folk pop

Robyn Hitchcock chronology
Jewels for Sophia (1999)	A Star for Bram (2000)	Robyn Sings (2002)

Professional ratings
Review scores
Source	Rating
Allmusic	link

A Star for Bram is an album released by Robyn Hitchcock in 2000, comprising outtakes from his then recent Jewels for Sophia. It was issued on Hitchcock's own Editions PAF! label. The cover art matches its partner album, but is printed in different colours.

Although nominally outtakes, several of the tracks which appear are as strong as those on Jewels for Sophia, and include a formal recording of "1974", previously only available as a live track.

"I Saw Nick Drake" has garnered the most attention, being a plaintive ballad about English guitar legend Nick Drake, whilst "Nietzsche's Way" references the group Spirit, and their classic "Nature's Way". "Antwoman" references the Bob Marley song "Punky Reggae Party".

== Track listing ==
1. "Daisy Bomb"
2. "I Saw Nick Drake"
3. "Adoration of the City"
4. "1974"
5. "I Wish I Liked You"
6. "Nietzsche's Way"
7. "The Philosopher's Stone"
8. "The Green Boy"
9. "Judas Sings (Jesus & Me)"
10. "Antwoman (Dub)"
11. "I Used to Love You"
12. "The Underneath"

== Sources ==
- "Official Robyn Hitchcock website". Archived from the original on 7 March 2000.
