= Storefront Hitchcock (soundtrack) =

2000 soundtrack album by Robyn Hitchcock

Soundtrack album by Robyn Hitchcock
- Released: 2000
- Label: Warner Bros.

Storefront Hitchcock is the title of a soundtrack album by Robyn Hitchcock, released subsequent to the 1998 film of the same name, which was directed by Jonathan Demme.

Recorded by John Hanlon and David Hewitt on Remote Recording Services' Silver Truck, the soundtrack CD features twelve songs, interspersed with several ad-libbed Hitchcock monologues.

The songs themselves include five not previously released in any form by Hitchcock, one of which is an acoustic cover of Jimi Hendrix' "The Wind Cries Mary". Hitchcock would make full studio recordings of a couple of others for subsequent albums, although "Let's Go Thundering" and "Where Do You Go When You Die" remain unavailable elsewhere. The concurrent double-LP vinyl edition contains additional songs, some not found in the film.

== CD track listing ==
All tracks composed by Robyn Hitchcock; except where indicated

1. "1974"
2. "Let's Go Thundering"
3. "I'm Only You"
4. "Glass Hotel"
5. "I Something You"
6. "The Yip! Song"
7. "Freeze"
8. "Alright Yeah"
9. "Where Do You Go When You Die?"
10. "The Wind Cries Mary" (Jimi Hendrix)
11. "No, I Don't Remember Guildford"
12. "Beautiful Queen"

== LP track listing ==
Side One

1. "1974"
2. "Let's Go Thundering"
3. "Filthy Bird"
4. "Statue With a Walkman"

Side Two

1. "I'm Only You"
2. "Glass Hotel"
3. "I Something You"
4. "The Yip! Song"
5. "You and Oblivion"

Side Three

1. "Freeze"
2. "Airscape"
3. "Alright Yeah"
4. "Where Do You Go When You Die?"

Side Four

1. "The Wind Cries Mary"
2. "No, I Don't Remember Guildford"
3. "Eerie Green Storm Lantern"
4. "Beautiful Queen"

== Personnel ==
- Robyn Hitchcock - vocals, narrator, acoustic guitar, electric guitar, harmonica
- Tim Keegan - guitar, vocals
- Deni Bonet - violin

== Sources ==
- "Official Robyn Hitchcock website". Archived from the original on 12 October 1999.
