= Gravy Deco =

1995 compilation album by Robyn Hitchcock

Gravy Deco (The Complete Groovy Decay/Decoy Sessions)

Compilation album by Robyn Hitchcock
- Released: 1995
- Genre: Alternative rock

Professional ratings
Review scores
Source	Rating
Allmusic	link

Gravy Deco (The Complete Groovy Decay/Decoy Sessions) is an album by Robyn Hitchcock, issued by Rhino Records during a spell of intense re-issuing of his work in the mid-1990s. The album's material had surfaced in the early 1980s, initially as Groovy Decay, and then later, substantially remixed, as Groovy Decoy.

Gravy Deco can therefore be seen as a compilation, bringing together all versions of all tracks on a single CD. Due to its nature, there are two different versions of several titles, and a couple of additional 'bonus' numbers sourced from old singles recorded at around the same time.

The CD appeared during 1995.

== Track listing ==
1. "The Rain"
2. "The Cars She Used to Drive"
3. "It Was the Night"
4. "Young People Scream"
5. "How Do You Work This Thing?"
6. "When I Was a Kid"
7. "Midnight Fish"
8. "Night Ride to Trinidad"
9. "Fifty Two Stations"
10. "Young People Scream"
11. "The Rain"
12. "America"
13. "The Cars She Used to Drive"
14. "Grooving on an Inner Plane"
15. "St. Petersburg"
16. "When I Was a Kid"
17. "Midnight Fish"
18. "Night Ride to Trinidad" (special disco mix)
19. "Kingdom of Love" (previously unissued mix)
