= This Is the BBC =

2006 live album by Robyn Hitchcock

Live album by Robyn Hitchcock
- Released: April 2006
- Recorded: 1995–1999
- Genre: Alternative rock
- Label: Hux Records

This Is the BBC is an album by Robyn Hitchcock, released on the Hux Records label in April 2006.

It rounds up fourteen tracks recorded for radio, primarily with Andy Kershaw between 1995 and 1999. It can therefore be viewed as a sequel piece to The Kershaw Sessions.

The tracks cover Hitchcock's contemporary material at the time of recording, and include a version of the evocative "I Saw Nick Drake" with lyrical amendments. It also includes a cover of Bob Dylan's "It Takes a Lot to Laugh, It Takes a Train to Cry".

The packaging features Hitchcock's artwork and significantly utilises a painting by his father Raymond as a cover, which dates to 1954. (Raymond Hitchcock is also pictured in the booklet.)

AllMusic noted about the album, "Casual fans may not find much to sink their teeth into, but longtime Hitchcock collectors will find This Is the BBC to be an above-average oddity."

== Track listing ==
1. "Man With a Woman's Shadow"
2. "Heliotrope"
3. "De Chirico Street"
4. "The Cheese Alarm"
5. "Jewels for Sophia"
6. "Polly on the Shore"
7. "Where Do You Go When You Die?"
8. "I Saw Nick Drake"
9. "It Takes a Lot to Laugh, It Takes a Train to Cry"
10. "Andy Kershaw Jingle"
11. "Birds in Perspex"
12. "Sally Was a Legend"
13. "Elizabeth Jade"
14. "Madonna of the Wasps"
