= Tromsø, Kaptein =

2011 album by Robyn Hitchcock

Studio album by Robyn Hitchcock
- Released: 2011
- Genre: Jangle pop
- Label: Hype City
- Producer: Paul Noble

Robyn Hitchcock chronology
Propellor Time (2010)	Tromsø, Kaptein (2011)	Love from London (2013)

Tromsø, Kaptein is the eighteenth studio album by Robyn Hitchcock, released and recorded on the Norwegian label Hype City Records in 2011. The album's title refers to the city of Tromsø in northern Norway.

The lyrics are in English, except 'Godnatt Oslo' ("Goodnight Oslo") where Hitchcock sings in Norwegian.

== Track listing ==
1. "Light Blue Afternoon"
2. "Raining Twilight Coast"
3. "Savannah"
4. "Dismal City"
5. "Old Man Weather"
6. "Erasing Your Life"
7. "August in Hammersmith"
8. "Everything About You"
9. "The Abyss"
10. "Godnatt Oslo"
