= Obliteration Pie =

2005 Japanese outtakes album by Robyn Hitchcock

Compilation album by Robyn Hitchcock
- Released: 2005
- Genre: Alternative rock

Obliteration Pie is an album by Robyn Hitchcock, released in Japan in 2005.

Not released in the UK or America, the set nonetheless contains six otherwise unavailable titles, and re-makes of several tracks from Hitchcock's catalogue such as "Madonna Of The Wasps" and "My Wife And My Dead Wife", the latter song introduced with one of his live spoken monologues.

The album includes a cover of the Lipps Inc. disco classic "Funkytown", the result of his latter-day interest in remaking unlikely 1970s tracks for live audiences.

This is the first Hitchcock release to include video footage on the disc, in this case promo clips for "I Often Dream Of Trains" and "The Man With The Lightbulb Head", both of which date to the mid-1980s, and originally appeared on the video release of Gotta Let This Hen Out.

The booklet contains lyrics in English and Japanese.

== Track listing ==
1. "Madonna of the Wasps" (New Version)
2. "City of Women"
3. "I Fall Into Your Eyes"
4. "Arms of Love" (New Version)
5. "A Man's Gotta Know His Limitations, Briggs"
6. "Madelaine"
7. "Let The Sun Begin"
8. "My Dreams Are Scars"
9. "Frank Sinatra Intro to 'Wife'"
10. "My Wife and My Dead Wife" (Live)
11. "Chinese Bones" (Live)
12. "Funkytown"
13. "Butterfly"
14. "Queen Elvis" (New Version)
