= The Man Upstairs (album) =

2014 album by Robyn Hitchcock

Studio album by Robyn Hitchcock
- Released: 2014
- Recorded: 2013
- Genre: Folk pop
- Label: Yep Roc
- Producer: Joe Boyd

Robyn Hitchcock chronology
Love from London (2013)	The Man Upstairs (2014)	Robyn Hitchcock (2017)

Professional ratings
Aggregate scores
Source	Rating
Metacritic	(70/100)
Review scores
Source	Rating
Allmusic	3/5 stars

The Man Upstairs is the twentieth studio album by Robyn Hitchcock. It was released on August 26, 2014 on the Yep Roc Records label. The album comprises ten acoustic songs, all produced by Joe Boyd, noted for his work with various folk acts in the 1970s.

It contains five original songs by Hitchcock and five covers of songs by the Psychedelic Furs, Roxy Music, Grant-Lee Phillips, Norwegian indie-rock band I Was a King, and The Doors. I Was a King's Anne Lise Frøkedal also plays guitar and sings vocal harmonies on the album. The album's cover was created by musician and artist Gillian Welch.

In 2020, Hitchcock released an album of outtakes from the Man Upstairs sessions, The Man Downstairs: Demos & Rarities.

== Reception ==
The album was well received by critics: according to Metacritic, the album has received an average review score of 70/100, based on 17 reviews.

== Track listing ==
No.	Title	Composer	Length
1.	"The Ghost in You"	Richard Butler, Tim Butler	4:28
2.	"San Francisco Patrol"	Robyn Hitchcock	4:19
3.	"To Turn You On"	Bryan Ferry	4:10
4.	"Trouble in Your Blood"	Robyn Hitchcock	4:42
5.	"Somebody to Break Your Heart"	Robyn Hitchcock	2:21
6.	"Don't Look Down"	Grant-Lee Phillips	5:08
7.	"Ferries"	Anne Lise Frøkedal, Frode Strømstad	3:02
8.	"Comme Toujours"	Robyn Hitchcock	3:08
9.	"The Crystal Ship"	The Doors, Jim Morrison	2:27
10.	"Recalling the Truth"	Robyn Hitchcock	4:26

== Charts ==
Chart (2018)	Peak position
UK Independent Albums (OCC)	49
US Top Current Albums (Billboard)	184
US Heatseekers Albums (Billboard)	11
US Independent Albums (Billboard)	45
