= Goodnight Oslo =

2009 album by Robyn Hitchcock & the Venus 3

Studio album by Robyn Hitchcock & The Venus 3
- Released: 17 February 2009
- Recorded: 2008
- Genre: Folk pop
- Label: Yep Roc
- Producer: Kurt Bloch

Robyn Hitchcock & The Venus 3 chronology
Olé! Tarantula (2006)	Goodnight Oslo (2009)	Propellor Time (2010)

Professional ratings
Review scores
Source	Rating
Allmusic	4/5 stars
The Onion	(A)
Pitchfork Media	(6.5/10)
HonestTune.com	

Goodnight Oslo is the sixteenth studio album by Robyn Hitchcock, and his second with The Venus 3. Recorded with Peter Buck of R.E.M., Scott McCaughey of Young Fresh Fellows and Bill Rieflin of Ministry and R.E.M., who are billed collectively as The Venus 3. Colin Meloy of The Decemberists provided one of the backup vocals in "Saturday Groovers", as Hitchcock provided guitar for a track on the Decemberists' album The Hazards of Love.

== Track list ==
1. "What You Is" (Hitchcock) – 3:26
2. "Your Head Here" (Hitchcock) – 3:48
3. "Saturday Groovers" (Hitchcock) – 2:48
4. "I'm Falling" (Hitchcock) – 4:34
5. "Hurry for the Sky" (Hitchcock) - 3:11
6. "Sixteen Years" (Hitchcock, Peter Buck) – 4:24
7. "Up to Our Nex" (Hitchcock) – 3:47
8. "Intricate Thing" (Hitchcock) – 3:31
9. "TLC" (Hitchcock) – 3:46
10. "Goodnight Oslo" (Hitchcock) – 6:01
