= Planet England =

EP by Robyn Hitchcock & Andy Partridge
- Released: September 6, 2019
- Genre: Alternative rock
- Length: 16:56
- Label: Ape House

Robyn Hitchcock chronology
| Robyn Hitchcock (2017) | Planet England (2019) | The Man Downstairs: Demos & Rarities (2020) |

Andy Partridge chronology
| Gonwards (with Peter Blegvad) (2012) | Planet England (2019) |

Planet England is a collaborative EP by English alternative rock songwriters Robyn Hitchcock and Andy Partridge. It was released September 6, 2019 by Partridge's label, Ape House.

== Recording and songwriting process ==
The recordings were first made in 2006 in Partridge's backyard home studio in Swindon, England, which Hitchcock jokingly described in one interview as "two old psychedelic pensioners rocking away in a shed in a back garden," but also noted that Partridge's well-known production and technical skills made his back-garden shed "the equivalent of the entire firepower of Abbey Road's Studio One." The songs were written together around Partridge's kitchen table, in what Partridge described as a "genuine 50/50 collaboration." Both men sang and played guitar; Partridge played bass and drum programming, and did most of the post-production. The recordings were not completed until 2018, when Hitchcock and Partridge got back together to mix them.

Both Hitchcock and Partridge remarked in the press that their collaborative songwriting came unexpectedly easily, perhaps because of their similar life experience as vanguards of the 1970s/1980s alternative rock movement and similar set of influences, including Syd Barrett, The Beatles, The Kinks, and Captain Beefheart. (The title of "Turn Me On, Deadman" references the backwards-masked phrase that can supposedly be heard in the Beatles' "Revolution No. 9.") Another collaborative album is planned.

== Critical reception ==
Mark Smotroff of Audiophile Review said that the EP "initially underwhelmed me, but on subsequent listens [its] charms and strengths emerge," giving particular praise to how well the singers' voices work together, and the "unexpected chord changes [and] harmonic shifts" of the "McCartney-esque" song "Got My..." Record Collector magazine said the EP was "a small eternity in gestation but is eminently worth the wait; a plump, luscious yield."

== Track listing ==
All tracks are written by Robyn Hitchcock and Andy Partridge.

| No. | Title | Length |
|---|---|---|
| 1. | "Turn Me On, Deadman" | 3:34 |
| 2. | "Flight Attendants, Please Prepare for Love" | 3:59 |
| 3. | "Got My..." | 3:40 |
| 4. | "Planet England" | 5:43 |
