= Groovy Decay =

1982 album by Robyn Hitchcock

Studio album by Robyn Hitchcock
- Released: 1982
- Recorded: Advision Studios, London
- Genre: Rock
- Label: Albion Records; Combat; Yep Roc
- Producer: Steve Hillage

Robyn Hitchcock chronology
Black Snake Diamond Role (1981)	Groovy Decay (1982)	I Often Dream of Trains (1984)

Professional ratings
Review scores
Source	Rating
AllMusic	2/5 stars
The Rolling Stone Album Guide	2.5/5 stars

Groovy Decay was the second solo album by Robyn Hitchcock, released in 1982. His backing band for the record featured Sara Lee of Gang of Four on bass and Anthony Thistlethwaite later of the Waterboys on saxophone.

Hitchcock refuted claims that he held contempt for the record itself in a 1990 interview. He explained, "The recording of Groovy Decay was a drag, so we released the demos for it and called it Groovy Decoy because it was fractionally different ... I'm quite happy with all of it. I don't sit around wishing I hadn't done it." Groovy Decoy was issued in 1986 with completely different cover art, substituted demo versions of five of the tracks, and a different playing order. A Rhino CD reissue in 1995 incorporated the two sets of tracks together under the title Gravy Deco.

In 2007, Yep Roc Records remastered Groovy Decay and made it available exclusively as a digital download on its website. The download includes the bonus tracks, "How Do You Work this Thing?", "It Was the Night", and "Falling Leaves", as well as demo versions of four of the album's tracks as previously issued on Groovy Decoy. The demo of "Midnight Fish" is the only Groovy Decoy track not included on this re-issue.

== Track listing ==
All songs written by Robyn Hitchcock, except as indicated.

=== Groovy Decay ===
==== Side one ====
1. "Night Ride to Trinidad"
2. "Fifty Two Stations"
3. "Young People Scream"
4. "The Rain"
5. "America"

==== Side two ====
1. "The Cars She Used to Drive"
2. "Grooving on an Inner Plane"
3. "St. Petersburg"
4. "When I Was a Kid"
5. "Midnight Fish" (Hitchcock, Dan Discovert)

==== 1st CD issue bonus tracks (Albion Records 1985) ====
1. "How Do You Work This Thing" - originally B-side to "America" single, 1982
2. "It Was The Night" - originally B-side to "America" single, 1982

=== Groovy Decoy (Midnight Records 1986) ===
==== Side one ====
1. "Fifty Two Stations"
2. "St. Petersburg"
3. "America"
4. "Night Ride to Trinidad"
5. "How Do You Work This Thing"
6. "The Cars She Used to Drive" (Demo)

==== Side two ====
1. "It Was The Night"
2. "Young People Scream" (Demo)
3. "The Rain" (Demo)
4. "When I Was a Kid" (Demo)
5. "Midnight Fish" (Demo)

==== 2nd CD issue bonus tracks (Midnight Records 1986) ====
1. "Grooving On a Inner Plane" (Single version)

=== Gravy Deco (Rhino Records 1995) ===
1. "The Rain" (Demo)
2. "The Cars She Used to Drive" (Demo)
3. "It Was The Night"
4. "Young People Scream" (Demo)
5. "How Do You Work This Thing"
6. "When I Was a Kid" (Demo)
7. "Midnight Fish" (Demo)
8. "Night Ride to Trinidad"
9. "Fifty Two Stations"
10. "Young People Scream"
11. "The Rain"
12. "America"
13. "The Cars She Used to Drive"
14. "Grooving on an Inner Plane"
15. "St. Petersburg"
16. "When I Was a Kid"
17. "Midnight Fish"

==== CD issue bonus tracks (Rhino Records 1995) ====
1. "Night Ride to Trinidad" (Special disco Mix)
2. "Kingdom of Love" (Previously Unissued Mix)

Notes: This release has all versions, except "Grooving On a Inner Plane" (Single version) which was moved to Black Snake Diamond Role

==== Download Only version (Yep Roc Records 2007) ====
1. "Night Ride to Trinidad"
2. "Fifty Two Stations"
3. "Young People Scream"
4. "The Rain"
5. "America"
6. "The Cars She Used to Drive"
7. "Grooving on an Inner Plane"
8. "St. Petersburg"
9. "When I Was a Kid"
10. "Midnight Fish"
11. "How Do You Work this Thing?"
12. "It Was the Night"
13. "Falling Leaves" - originally B-side to "The Bells of Rhymney" single, 1984
14. "The Rain" (Demo)
15. "The Cars She Used to Drive" (Demo)
16. "Young People Scream" (Demo)
17. "When I Was a Kid" (Demo)

Notes:

"Midnight Fish" (Demo) dropped from Yep Roc Release.
"Falling Leaves" also appears on Invisible Hitchcock CD

== Personnel ==
- Robyn Hitchcock - guitars, vocals
- Sara Lee - bass
- Matthew Seligman - bass
- Anthony Thistlethwaite - saxophone
- Rod Johnson - drums
- Chris Cox - trumpet on "America"
- James A. Smith - backing vocals on "Nightride to Trinidad", "Grooving On an Inner Plane" and "Midnight Fish" (uncredited)

Technical

- Nick Cook - engineer
- Ken Ansell, Robyn Hitchcock - cover sleeve
- Gavin Cochrane - photography
