= Olé! Tarantula =

2006 album by Robyn Hitchcock & the Venus 3

Studio album by Robyn Hitchcock & the Venus 3
- Released: 3 October 2006
- Recorded: 2006
- Genre: Alternative rock
- Label: Yep Roc
- Producer: Kurt Bloch

Robyn Hitchcock & the Venus 3 chronology
Spooked (2004)	Olé! Tarantula (2006)	Goodnight Oslo (2009)

Professional ratings
Review scores
Source	Rating
AllMusic	4/5 stars
The A.V. Club	B
The Phoenix	3.5/4 stars
Pitchfork Media	7.6/10
PopMatters	8/10 stars
Rolling Stone	4/5 stars
Slant Magazine	4/5 stars
Stylus Magazine	B

Olé! Tarantula is the fifteenth studio album by Robyn Hitchcock, recorded with Peter Buck of R.E.M., Scott McCaughey of Young Fresh Fellows, and Bill Rieflin of Ministry. Together, they are known as Robyn Hitchcock and The Venus 3. It was recorded in Seattle, Washington, in 2006, the same year of its release.

The album contains ten original compositions, continuing largely in the vein of Hitchcock's Spooked, which was also made in close collaboration with other musicians. Of the tracks, "Adventure Rocket Ship" was pulled for a single and released with an animated promotional video. Several other tracks including "Olé Tarantula" and "(A Man's Gotta Know His Limitations) Briggs" had been in Hitchcock's live act for some time prior to this release. ("Briggs" had already seen the light of day on Obliteration Pie.) The track "N.Y. Doll" is a eulogy of sorts to Arthur Kane, the New York Dolls bassist who had recently died.

Other guest musicians include former Soft Boys Morris Windsor and Kimberley Rew.

The cover image and internal cartoons are drawn by Hitchcock.

== Track list ==
All tracks written by Robyn Hitchcock, except where noted.

1. "Adventure Rocket Ship" – 2:50
2. "Underground Sun" – 3:57
3. "Museum of Sex" – 4:00
4. "Belltown Ramble" – 6:15
5. "Olé! Tarantula" – 3:51
6. "(A Man's Gotta Know His Limitations) Briggs" – 5:34
7. "Red Locust Frenzy" – 3:00
8. "'Cause It's Love (Saint Parallelogram)" (lyrics: Hitchcock; music: Hitchcock, Andy Partridge) – 3:23
9. "The Authority Box" – 4:13
10. "N.Y. Doll" – 3:45
