= Luxor (album) =

2003 album by Robyn Hitchcock

Studio album by Robyn Hitchcock
- Released: 2003
- Genre: Folk pop
- Label: Editions PAF!

Robyn Hitchcock chronology
Jewels for Sophia (1999)	Luxor (2003)	Spooked (2004)

Professional ratings
Review scores
Source	Rating
Allmusic	link

Luxor is the thirteenth studio album by Robyn Hitchcock, released in March 2003 on Hitchcock's own Editions PAF! label.

The album contains thirteen self-composed tracks, including the instrumental title song and several love songs to Hitchcock's partner Michele Noach. One of these, "One L" makes reference to the spelling of her name, whilst "Ant Corridor" was written around one of Noach's off-hand comments. Another instrumental, "The Wolf House", is a guitar-based composition drawing on the repeating figures heard in the coda of "You Remind Me of You". The album features a guest appearance by multi-instrumentalist/producer Jon Brion on the track "You Remind Me of You".

Despite being predominantly an acoustic set, several of these songs are up-tempo, and the album as a whole lacks Hitchcock's usual sense of minute observation. It comes packaged with a full colour booklet containing several of Noach's photographic portraits of Hitchcock.

== Track listing ==
1. "The Sound of Sound"
2. "One L"
3. "Penelope's Angles"
4. "The Idea of You"
5. "You Remind Me of You"
6. "Luxor"
7. "Keep Finding Me"
8. "Maria Lyn"
9. "Round Song"
10. "Ant Corridor"
11. "Idonia"
12. "The Wolf House"
13. "Solpadeine"

== Sources ==
- "Official Robyn Hitchcock website". Archived from the original on 12 October 1999.
