= Shufflemania! =

Studio album by Robyn Hitchcock
- Released: 18 October 2022
- Recorded: 2021
- Studios: Hitchcock's home studio, Nashville, Tennessee, US; Abbey Road Studios, London, England, UK ("Socrates in Thin Air"); Individual musicians contributing from their homes or local studios
- Genre: Power pop
- Language: English
- Label: Tiny Ghost Records
- Producers: Robyn Hitchcock; Emma Swift

Robyn Hitchcock chronology
The Man Downstairs: Demos & Rarities (2020)	Shufflemania! (2022)	Life After Infinity (2023)

Shufflemania! is the twenty-second studio album by Robyn Hitchcock. It was released on 18 October 2022 on Tiny Ghost Records and has received positive reviews from critics.

== Reception ==
According to the review aggregator Metacritic, Shufflemania! received "universal acclaim" based on a weighted average score of 88 out of 100 from 9 critic scores. Editors at AllMusic rated this album 4 out of 5 stars, with critic James Christopher Monger writing that this release "delivers a more than worthy successor to his acclaimed 2017 self-titled effort" that "is comprised primarily of dazzling power pop bangers... and spare, moving ruminations on death and oblivion". The music department of The Daily Telegraph included this among the best releases of the week and Andrew Perry scored it 3 out of 5 stars and he characterized this work as "an English one-off, in fine voice". In Glide Magazine, Shawn Donohue characterized this music as "a kaleidoscope, throwback pop rock record, [with] ten songs from various inspiration, attitude, and emotion" and compared individual songs to The Beatles and Pink Floyd. Writing for Mojo, Victoria Segal gave this album 4 out of 5 stars, stating that "none of [the guest musicians] crowd out Hitcheock’s sensitive songwriting". At PopMatters, John Garratt called this one of Hitchcock's best albums and probably his most consistent, garnering an 8 out of 10.

In Record Collector, Chris Roberts gave Shufflemania! 4 out of 5 stars and praised the diverse moods and sounds on this work, including "heavy skiffle to serpent gods to ponderings on Pacino, noir and mortality, this charms and challenges". The Shepherd Express' Jon M. Gilbertson stated that the songwriting on this release "stirs the motes of mysticism floating in everyday air, and his voice, while not technically dazzling when holding a note or melody, emanates immense expressiveness, quavering toward a falsetto" and praised how Hitchcock can retain comedy and airiness in his lyrics while he "remains serious about his craft and decidedly unsolemn about almost everything else". This was an Editor Pick in Spill Magazine, where Ljubinko Zivkovic gave it a 9 out of 10, noting the consistently high quality throughout Hitchcock's career, ending that "again, it seems he knocks these gems out with ease, something some other artists can only strive for and rarely reach". Tom Pinnock of Uncut rated Shufflemania! an 8 out of 10, writing that "10 short, snappy songs home-recorded in Nashville lockdown" that were "spruced up" that makes for an album that is not quite as striking as its predecessor".

== Track listing ==
All compositions by Robyn Hitchcock.

1. "The Shuffle Man" – 2:40
2. "The Inner Life of Scorpio" – 3:52
3. "The Feathery Serpent God" – 4:01
4. "Midnight Tram to Nowhere" – 4:02
5. "Socrates in Thin Air" – 3:19
6. "Noirer Than Noir" – 4:48
7. "The Man Who Loves the Rain" – 4:11
8. "The Sir Tommy Shovell" – 3:22
9. "The Raging Muse" – 4:15
10. "One Day (It's Being Scheduled)" – 3:44

== Personnel ==
"The Shuffle Man"

- Robyn Hitchcock – electric guitar, vocals
- Brendan Benson – bass guitar, electric guitar, organ, drums, percussion, harmony vocals

"The Inner Life of Scorpio"

- Robyn Hitchcock – acoustic guitar solo, vocals
- Charlie Francis – electric guitar, percussion
- Anne Lise Frøkedal – harmony vocals
- Johnny Marr – acoustic guitar, electric guitar, bass guitar, strings, piano, drums, backing vocals
- Patrick Sansone – baritone guitar, keyboards, percussion

"The Feathery Serpent God"

- Robyn Hitchcock – electric guitar, vocals
- Ryan Brewer – drums, percussion
- Anne Lise Frøkedal – choral vocals in the coda
- Patrick Sansone – baritone guitar, keyboards
- Kelley Stoltz – shruti box, sitar
- Emma Swift – harmony vocals

"Midnight Tram to Nowhere"

- Robyn Hitchcock – acoustic guitar, electric guitar, harmonica, vocals
- Ryan Brewer – drums, percussion
- Tristen Gaspadarek – harmony vocals
- Buddy Hughen – harmony vocals
- Patrick Sansone – 12-string guitar, electric guitar, Moog synthesizer, vocal treatments

"Socrates in Thin Air"

- Robyn Hitchcock – acoustic guitar, electric guitar, harmonica, vocals
- Charlie Francis – bass guitar, keyboards
- Kimberley Rew – electric guitar
- Eric Slick – drums, percussion
- Emma Swift – harmony vocals

"Noirer Than Noir"

- Robyn Hitchcock – acoustic guitar, electric guitar, vocals
- Charlie Francis – bass guitar, marimba, percussion

"The Man Who Loves the Rain"

- Robyn Hitchcock – acoustic guitar, electric guitar, vocals
- Ryan Brewer – piano, drums, percussion
- Charlie Francis – keyboards
- Patrick Sansone – bass guitar
- Emma Swift – harmony vocals

"The Sir Tommy Shovel"

- Robyn Hitchcock – electric guitar, vocals
- Brendan Benson – acoustic guitar, electric guitar, bass guitar, drums, percussion, harmony vocals
- Kimberley Rew – electric guitar

"The Raging Muse"

- Robyn Hitchcock – electric guitar, vocals
- Ryan Brewer – drums, percussion
- Charlie Francis – bagpipes, percussion
- Davey Lane – electric guitar
- Patrick Sansone – bass guitar, percussion

"One Day (It’s Being Scheduled)"

- Robyn Hitchcock – electric guitar, vocals
- Charlie Francis – bass guitar, percussion
- Sean Ono Lennon – bass guitar, bells, celesta, clavinet, Mellotron, vibraphone, vocoder, keyboards, drums
- Patrick Sansone – keyboards
- Morris Windsor – harmony vocals

Technical personnel

- Chris Bolster – audio engineering on "Socrates in Thin Air"
- Tim Bond – audio engineering for Kimberly Rew
- Charlie Francis – mixing at Stwdio Penty, Cardiff, Wales, United Kingdom
- Robyn Hitchcock – production, photography
- Scott Hollingsworth – audio engineering for Sean Ono Lennon
- Kyle Ryan – audio engineering for Eric Slick
- Steve Stewart – audio engineering for Kimberly Rew
- Emma Swift – production, photography
- Johnny Whitman – layout, design
- Gaz Williams – audio mastering at Fliskin Manor, Bristol, England, United Kingdom
