= Love from London =

2013 studio album by Robyn Hitchcock

Studio album by Robyn Hitchcock
- Released: 5 March 2013
- Recorded: 2013
- Length: 40:36
- Label: Yep Roc
- Producer: Paul Noble

Robyn Hitchcock chronology
Tromsø, Kaptein (2011)	Love from London (2013)	The Man Upstairs (2014)

Love from London (stylised as Love from Londøn in all caps) is the nineteenth studio album by Robyn Hitchcock, released on 5 March 2013 on the label Yep Roc Records.

== Critical reception ==
According to the review aggregator Metacritic, Love from London received "generally favorable reviews" based on a weighted average score of 77 out of 100 from 16 critic scores.

Professional ratings
Aggregate scores
Source	Rating
Metacritic	77/100
Review scores
Source	Rating
The A.V. Club	B+
AllMusic	3.5/5 stars
American Songwriter	4/5 stars
Consequence of Sound	B−
Filter	78%
God Is in the TV	4/5 stars
MusicOMH	4/5 stars
PopMatters	7/10
Record Collector	4/5 stars
Rolling Stone	4/5 stars

In The Sunday Times, Stewart Lee said, "Hitchcock has abandoned the toy town imagery of his ever maturing acid-pop for personal tones, though pterodactyls still stalk the dark skies of "Harry's Song". He remains possessed of an effortlessly psychedelic voice, somewhere between John Lennon, a Cambridge don and a woodland shaman, proceeding directly from his septum to your cerebellum."

== Track listing ==
All tracks are written by Robyn Hitchcock.

No.	Title	Length
1.	"Harry's Song"	4:20
2.	"Be Still"	4:14
3.	"Stupefied"	3:02
4.	"I Love You"	3:32
5.	"Devil on a String"	4:47
6.	"Strawberries Dress"	3:28
7.	"Death and Love"	4:09
8.	"Fix You"	3:51
9.	"My Rain"	2:56
10.	"End of Time"	6:26
