= The Man Downstairs: Demos & Rarities =

Compilation album of outtakes by Robyn Hitchcock
- Released: August 7, 2020
- Recorded: 2013
- Genre: Alternative rock
- Label: Tiny Ghost Records

Robyn Hitchcock chronology
Planet England (2019)	The Man Downstairs: Demos & Rarities (2020)	Shufflemania! (2022)

The Man Downstairs: Demos & Rarities is an album of outtakes by alternative rock singer and guitarist Robyn Hitchcock. It was released August 7, 2020 by Tiny Ghost Records, a label run by Hitchcock and his partner Emma Swift. It consists of material largely recorded in 2013, in Cardiff, Wales, as demos for Hitchcock's 2014 album The Man Upstairs. Following what Hitchcock called the "Judy Collins 1965-era" concept for The Man Upstairs, consisting of half covers and half originals, The Man Downstairs included previously unreleased versions of Nick Drake's "River Man" and Pink Floyd's "Arnold Layne" as well as a number of Hitchcock's own songs.

== Track listing ==
No.	Title	Composer	Length
1.	"All Love and No Peace"	Robyn Hitchcock	2:52
2.	"River Man"	Nick Drake	4:27
3.	"Arnold Layne"	Syd Barrett	3:17
4.	"Cavendish Square"	Robyn Hitchcock	2:52
5.	"The Threat of Freedom"	Robyn Hitchcock	3:14
6.	"The Tower Song"	Townes Van Zandt	4:40
7.	"I Pray When I'm Drunk"	Robyn Hitchcock	2:14
8.	"On Seeing Your Photograph"	Robyn Hitchcock	4:58
9.	"Born in Time"	Bob Dylan	3:39
10.	"Recalling the Truth"	Robyn Hitchcock	5:00
