= Robyn Hitchcock =

British musician (born 1953)

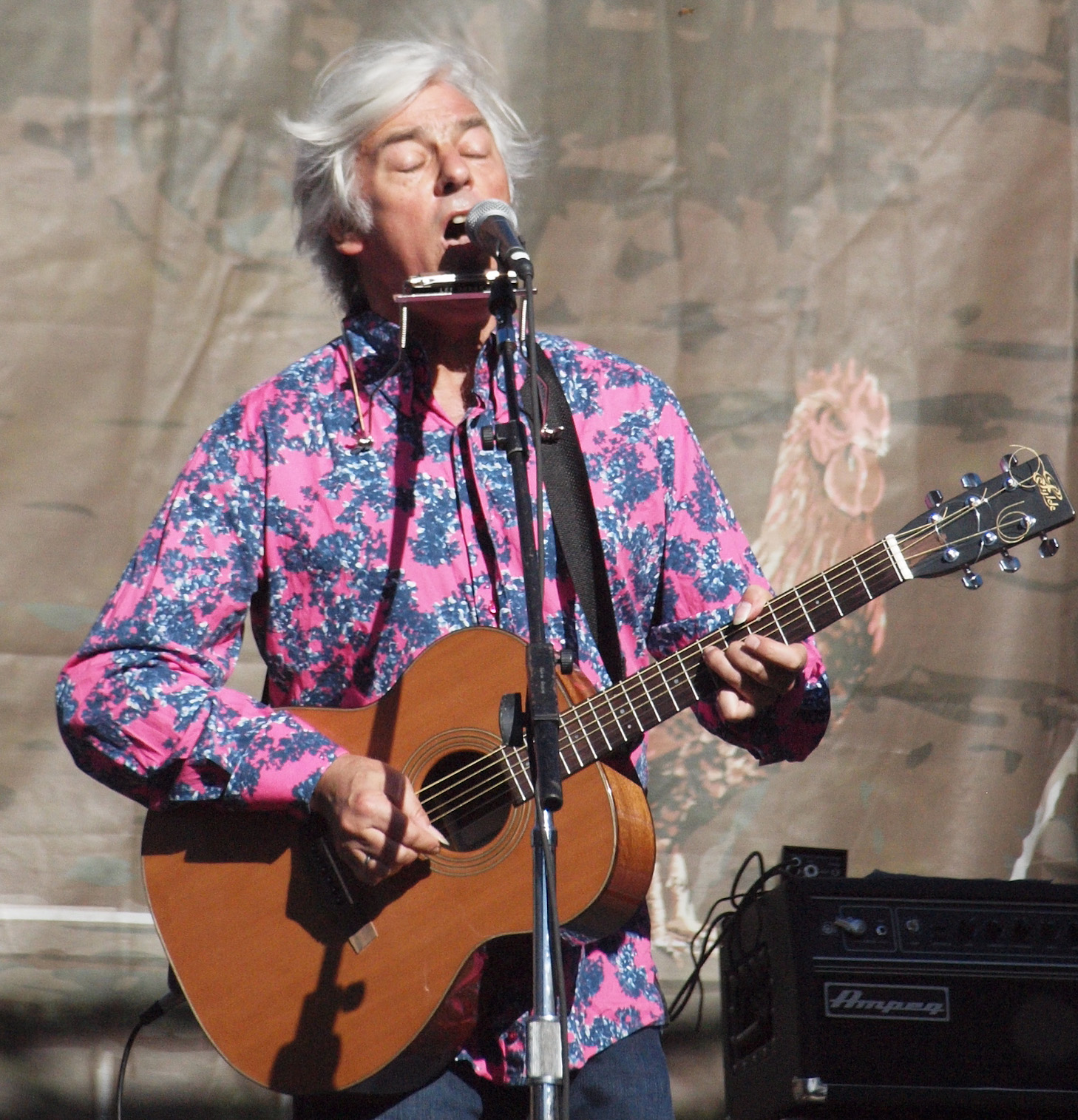
- Hardly Strictly Bluegrass festival, 6 October 2012

Background information
- Born: Robyn Rowan Hitchcock; 3 March 1953 (age 73); Paddington, London, England
- Genres: Alternative rock; jangle pop; psychedelic folk; post-punk
- Occupations: Musician; singer
- Instruments: Vocals; guitar; piano; harmonica; bass
- Labels: Tiny Ghost; Yep Roc; Rhino; Slash; Relativity; A&M; Sequel
- Formerly of: The Soft Boys
- Website: robynhitchcock.com

Robyn Rowan Hitchcock (born 3 March 1953) is an English singer-songwriter and musician. Known for his rich, surrealistic lyrical style and influenced by the psychedelic rock era, he led The Soft Boys in the late 1970s before initiating a prolific solo career. He recorded, initially with backing by The Egyptians, for two major American labels (A&M Records and Warner Bros.) over the course of the 1980s and 1990s and achieved college radio success in America. The subject of Jonathan Demme's live performance film Storefront Hitchcock (1998), Hitchcock has been acknowledged as a significant influence on alternative rock and folk performers including R.E.M. He continues to tour and record prolifically with collaborators including his wife Emma Swift and retains a dedicated cult following.

== Career ==
=== The Soft Boys to the Egyptians (1972–1993) ===
While at art school in London around 1972, Hitchcock was a member of the college band the Beetles. In 1974, he moved to Cambridge, where he did some busking, and joined a series of local bands: B.B. Blackberry and the Swelterettes, the Worst Fears, and Maureen and the Meatpackers. His next group, Dennis and the Experts, became the neo-psychedelia band The Soft Boys in 1976, recording their first EP, "Give It to The Soft Boys", at Spaceward studios, Cambridge, in 1977. After recording A Can of Bees (1979) and Underwater Moonlight (1980), the latter of which was described in Rolling Stone as a "classic" and influential on bands such as R.E.M. and The Replacements, the group broke up in 1981.

In 1981, Hitchcock released his solo debut, Black Snake Diamond Röle, which included instrumental backing by several former Soft Boys. He followed it in 1982 with the generally critically maligned Groovy Decay. Following his solo acoustic album I Often Dream of Trains in 1984, he formed a new band, The Egyptians, comprising former members of The Soft Boys (Andy Metcalfe and Morris Windsor, supplemented at first by early keyboardist Roger Jackson and very early saxophonist James Fletcher), resulting in their 1985 debut Fegmania!, which featured typically surrealist Hitchcock songs such as "My Wife and My Dead Wife" and "The Man with the Lightbulb Head". (A live album, Gotta Let This Hen Out!, was released at the end of that year.) Their popularity grew with the 1986 album Element of Light and they were subsequently signed to A&M Records in the U.S. The album Globe of Frogs, released in 1988, further expanded their reach, as the single "Balloon Man" became a college radio and MTV hit, followed in 1989 by "Madonna of the Wasps" from their Queen Elvis album. In 1989, they also teamed up with Peter Buck of R.E.M. and Peter Holsapple of The dB's, playing two gigs as Nigel and the Crosses, mostly covers.

At the beginning of 1990, Hitchcock took a break from the Egyptians and A&M Records to release another solo acoustic album, Eye, then resumed with the band's Perspex Island release in 1991. 1993's Respect, influenced a great deal by his father's death, marked the last Egyptians release and the end of his association with A&M Records.

=== Reunions and solo career, 1994–2006 ===
Early in 1994, after disbanding the Egyptians, Hitchcock embarked on a short reunion tour with The Soft Boys. His work received a slight boost in 1995 when his back catalogue (including both solo releases and Egyptians albums) were re-packaged and re-issued in the United States by the respected Rhino Records label. For the rest of the decade, he continued recording and performing as a solo artist, releasing several albums on Warner Brothers Records, such as 1996's Moss Elixir (which featured the contributions of violinist Deni Bonet and guitarist Tim Keegan), and the soundtrack from the Jonathan Demme-directed concert film Storefront Hitchcock in 1998. The 1999 release Jewels for Sophia, also on Warner, featured cameos from Southern California-based musicians Jon Brion and Grant-Lee Phillips, both of whom often shared the stage with Hitchcock when he played Los Angeles nightclub Largo. An album of outtakes from the Sophia sessions called A Star for Bram followed, released on Hitchcock's own label.

In 2000, the Italian music writer Luca Ferrari released a long interview with Hitchcock, A Middle Class Hero (Stampa Alternativa), in the form of a 96-page booklet in English and Italian accompanying a three-song CD of unreleased tracks.

In 2001, Hitchcock reunited and toured with Kimberley Rew, bassist Matthew Seligman, and Morris Windsor for The Soft Boys' re-release of their best-known album, 1980's Underwater Moonlight. The following year they recorded and released a new album, Nextdoorland, accompanied by a short album of outtakes, Side Three. The reunion was short-lived.

The 2002 double album Robyn Sings comprised cover versions of Bob Dylan songs, including a live re-creation (performed in 1996) of Dylan's so-called Live at the Royal Albert Hall 1966 concert. Hitchcock celebrated his 50th birthday in 2003 with a concert at the Queen Elizabeth Hall in London at which his then-new solo acoustic album Luxor was given away as a gift to all those attending, and an original poem of his was read by actor Alan Rickman. He continued collaborating with a series of different musicians, as on the album Spooked, which was recorded with country/folk duo (and longtime Hitchcock fans) Gillian Welch and David Rawlings.

=== The Venus 3 to present ===
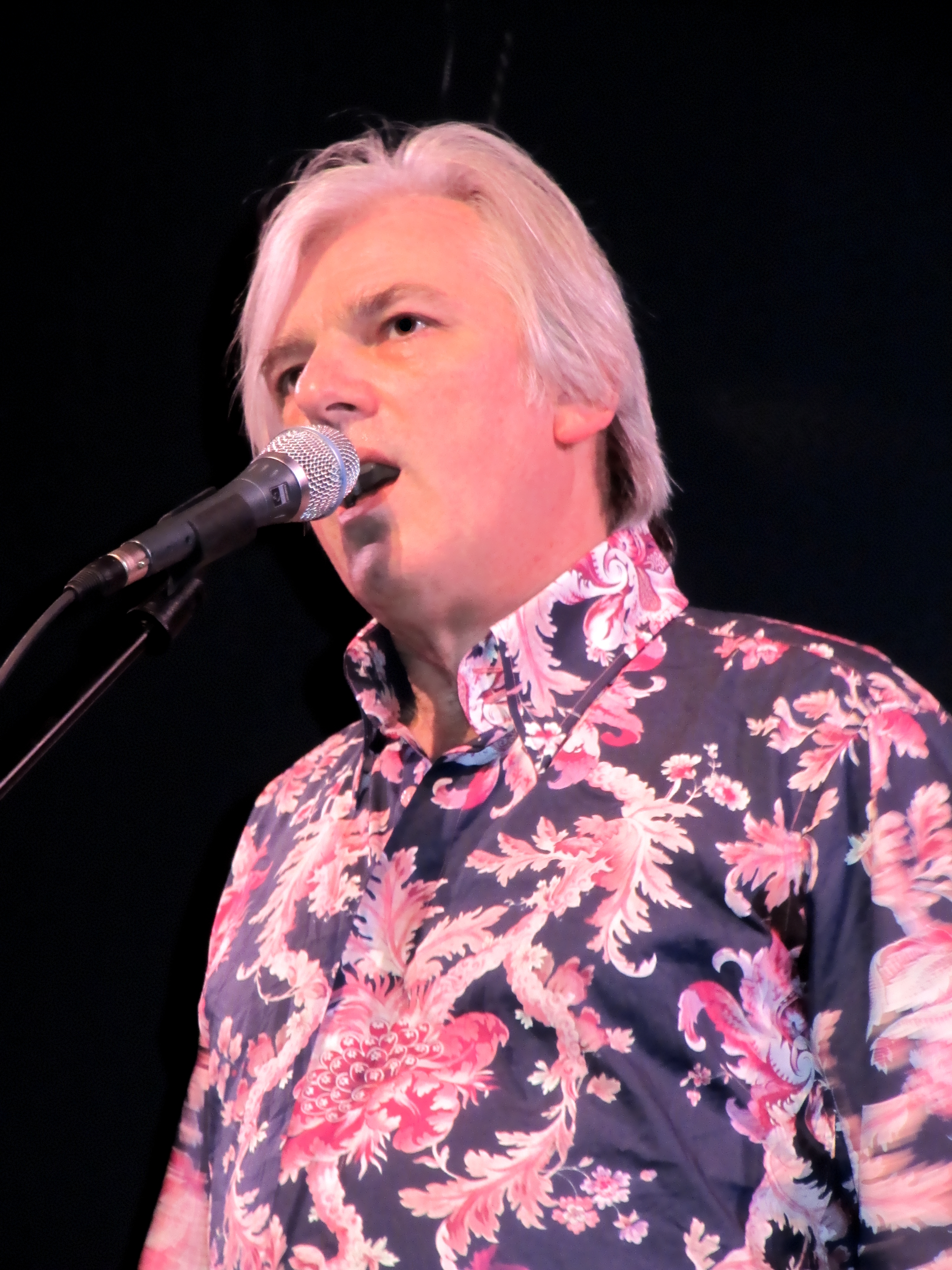
Hitchcock at Coolidge Corner Theatre in 2010

In 2006, Olé! Tarantula was released with the Venus 3, a band which consisted of longtime friends and collaborators R.E.M.'s Peter Buck and Young Fresh Fellows' frontman Scott McCaughey, as well as Ministry's Bill Rieflin (by then also R.E.M.'s full-time drummer). The song "'Cause It's Love (Saint Parallelogram)" was written with Andy Partridge of XTC.

In 2007, he was the subject of a documentary, Robyn Hitchcock: Sex, Food, Death... and Insects, directed by John Edginton, shown on the U.S. Sundance Channel and in the UK on BBC Four (and later released on DVD). "Food, sex and death are all corridors to life if you like. You need sex to get you here, you need food to keep you here and you need death to get you out and they’re the entry and exit signs." The filmmaker eavesdrops on Hitchcock at work on his latest collection of songs with contributors including Nick Lowe, former Led Zeppelin bassist John Paul Jones, Peter Buck and Gillian Welch. The film culminates with Hitchcock and the band taking the songs on the road in America. A live EP with The Venus 3, Sex, Food, Death... and Tarantulas, was released in conjunction with the documentary. The film also includes candid interviews with Hitchcock, who reveals much about the source of his work: "At heart I'm a frightened angry person. That's probably why my stuff isn't totally insubstantial. I'm constantly, deep down inside, in a kind of rage."

Late in 2007, Hitchcock's music was again re-packaged and re-released in the U.S.; Yep Roc Records began an extensive reissue campaign with three early solo releases and a double-CD compilation of rarities, which would be available separately or as part of a new boxed set release, I Wanna Go Backwards. In 2008, that boxed set was followed up with Luminous Groove, a boxed set of three early Egyptians releases and two further discs of rarities. In 2009, the electro-pop artist and remixer Pocket released an EP featuring Hitchcock called "Surround Him With Love", while Hitchcock released an entirely separate new album, Goodnight Oslo, with the Venus 3. At the end of the year, a live album called I Often Dream of Trains in New York documented the late-2008 onstage re-creation of his acclaimed 1984 acoustic album (a limited-edition deluxe version also included the materials to construct a kind of moving-image generator called a phenakistoscope). In 2009, he contributed to The Decemberists' concept album The Hazards of Love, performing the short instrumental solo "An Interlude." Also in 2009, Hitchcock provided the score for the film Women in Trouble, a feminist/exploitation "chick flick".

Concurrent with the redesign of his official website in early 2010, Hitchcock began to offer a series of "Phantom 45s" as downloads, each "45" being two newly recorded songs that would initially be offered as a free download. He also released the Propellor Time album, containing new material partially based on the "Sex, Food, Death" sessions shown in the 2007 documentary, but mainly featuring the Venus 3. In 2011, he released Tromsø, Kaptein, an album of songs written in Norway, and released physically only in that country. Hitchcock was chosen by Jeff Mangum of Neutral Milk Hotel to perform "I Often Dream of Trains" at the All Tomorrow's Parties festival, to be curated by Mangum in March 2012 in Minehead, England. The album Love from London (working title: File Under Pop) was released on Yep Roc Records on 5 March 2013. The label also released his subsequent record, The Man Upstairs, on 26 August 2014. April 2015 saw Hitchcock team up with Emma Swift to release a limited Record Store Day 7" single "Follow Your Money", backed with a stripped back cover of Neil Young's "Motion Pictures." The pair subsequently toured, releasing another 7" single double A side with the songs "Love Is A Drag" and "Life Is Change", produced by Teenage Fanclub's Norman Blake. In 2017, he released his eponymous album Robyn Hitchcock, with guest appearances from Gillian Welch and Emma Swift.

Hitchcock wrote the song "Sunday Never Comes" for the 2018 film Juliet, Naked, which was sung in the movie by Ethan Hawke's character, an aging, reclusive musician. He later released a companion video of his own version of the song.

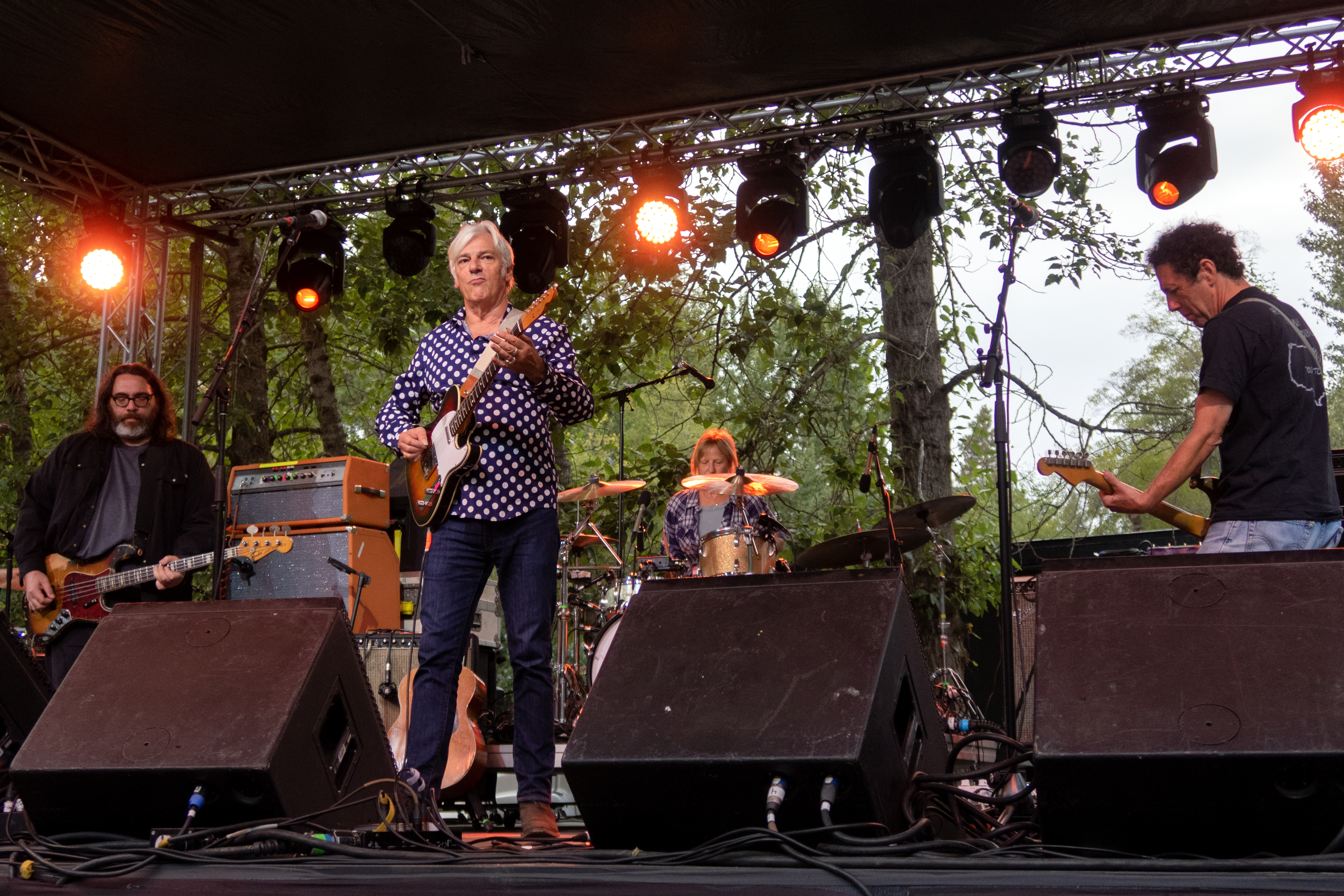
Hitchcock backed by Yo La Tengo in 2019 at Huichica Walla Walla, Washington

In September 2019, Hitchcock collaborated with XTC frontman Andy Partridge on a four-song EP Planet England, co-writing the songs and both singing. In 2020, he released The Man Downstairs: Demos & Rarities, an album of outtakes recorded in 2013 as demos for The Man Upstairs. He also appeared on Emma Swift's album of Bob Dylan covers, Blonde on the Tracks, recorded between 2017 and 2020 in Nashville, Tennessee and produced by Wilco's Pat Sansone.

== Personal life ==
Hitchcock was born in Paddington in West London, son of novelist Raymond Hitchcock (writer of Percy). He grew up in the small village of Abbots Worthy, Hampshire, near Winchester. He was educated at Winchester College, where he was a "groovy and alternative" friend of writer Julia Darling, daughter of a physics teacher at the college; his song "Underground Sun" is about her.

While at Winchester College, Hitchcock introduced to Aldous Huxley's autobiographical tale of drug use, The Doors of Perception. He also discovered the music of Bob Dylan, The Beach Boys, The Beatles, Jimi Hendrix, and Pink Floyd. Even though he objected to worship, Hitchcock joined in singing a "cornucopia of tunes" of Church of England hymns including "Eternal Father, Strong to Save", "Guide Me, O Thou Great Redeemer", and "Jerusalem", which he describes as "fabulous, permanent songs". After leaving Winchester in 1972, he went to art school in London.

In 1998, he collaborated with film director Jonathan Demme on a number of projects. In 1998, they collaborated for a live concert and film Storefront Hitchcock. He also appeared in Demme's 2004 remake of The Manchurian Candidate, in which he played the small role of double agent Laurent Tokar. Hitchcock also appeared in Demme's Rachel Getting Married in 2008, singing and playing guitar in a wedding-party band.

In September 2008, he joined the Disko Bay Cape Farewell expedition to the West Coast of Greenland. Cape Farewell is a UK-based arts organisation that brings artists, scientists and communicators together to instigate a cultural response to climate change. In August 2015, he moved to Nashville, Tennessee.

As of 2024, Hitchcock lived in East Nashville with his wife Emma Swift and their cats. He had a daughter, Maisie, from a previous relationship; she died in 2023 of peritoneal cancer.

In his 2024 memoir 1967: How I Got There and Why I Never Left, Hitchcock stated "I am what would in the twenty-first century be called 'on the spectrum': it turns out that I have most of the symptoms of Asperger's, at the high-functioning end of autism."

== Discography ==
=== Studio albums ===
- Black Snake Diamond Röle (1981)
- Groovy Decay (1982)
- I Often Dream of Trains (1984)
- Fegmania! (1985) – with the Egyptians
- Element of Light (1986) – with the Egyptians
- Globe of Frogs (1988) – with the Egyptians
- Queen Elvis (1989) – with the Egyptians
- Eye (1990)
- Perspex Island (1991) – with the Egyptians
- Respect (1993) – with the Egyptians
- Moss Elixir (1996)
- Jewels for Sophia (1999)
- Luxor (2003)
- Spooked (2004)
- Olé! Tarantula (2006) – with the Venus 3
- Goodnight Oslo (2009) – with the Venus 3
- Propellor Time (2010) – with the Venus 3
- Tromsø, Kaptein (2011)
- Love from London (2013)
- The Man Upstairs (2014)
- Robyn Hitchcock (2017)
- Shufflemania! (2022)
- Life After Infinity (2023)
- 1967: Vacations in the Past (2024)
- The Confuser (2026)

=== EPs ===
- Eaten by Her Own Dinner (1982) – 7"
- I Something You (1995) – 7"
- Planet England (with Andy Partridge) (2019)

=== Compilations ===
- Groovy Decoy (1985) – A re-worked version of Groovy Decay, featuring demo versions of many of that album's songs)
- Invisible Hitchcock (1986) – Outtakes and rarities: 1980–1986
- Gravy Deco (1995) – A compilation of the Groovy Decay and Groovy Decoy sessions
- You & Oblivion (1995) – Outtakes and rarities: 1981–1987
- Mossy Liquor (1996) – Outtakes and demo versions from Moss Elixir
- A Star for Bram (2000) – Outtakes from Jewels for Sophia
- A Middle-Class Hero (2000) – Italian-English authorised interview book written by Luca Ferrari with CD-EP of outtakes included
- Obliteration Pie (2005) – Japan-only collection of live tracks, rarities, and new studio re-recordings
- I Wanna Go Backwards (2007) – Boxed set of reissued albums, with many previously unreleased outtakes and rarities
- Shadow Cat (2008) – Outtakes and rarities: 1993–1999
- Luminous Groove (2008) – Boxed set of reissued albums, with many previously unreleased live performances, outtakes and rarities
- There Goes the Ice (2013) – Vinyl-only collection of rarities, most previously issued as digital-only tracks between 2010 and 2013
- The Man Downstairs: Demos & Rarities (2020) – Outtakes and demos recorded in 2013 for the Man Upstairs sessions

=== Live albums ===
- Gotta Let This Hen Out! (1985) – with the Egyptians
- Give It to the Thoth Boys - Live Oddities (1993) – cassette-only release sold on tour in 1993
- The Kershaw Sessions (1994) – with the Egyptians
- Live at the Cambridge Folk Festival (1998) – with the Egyptians
- Storefront Hitchcock (2000) – soundtrack to the concert film
- Robyn Sings (2002) – Double live album of Bob Dylan cover songs
- This Is the BBC (2006)
- Sex, Food, Death... and Tarantulas (2007) – Live EP
- I Often Dream of Trains in New York (2009) – CD+DVD

=== Best-of compilations ===
- Robyn Hitchcock (1995)
- Robyn Hitchcock & The Egyptians: Greatest Hits (1996) – with the Egyptians
- Uncorrected Personality Traits (1997) – Rhino Records best-of compilation of solo material
- Chronolology (2011) – Yep Roc best-of including Soft Boys, Egyptians, and solo material

=== Compilation appearances ===
- Time Between - A Tribute to the Byrds (Imaginary Records, 1989) – "Wild Mountain Thyme"
- Pave the Earth (A&M Records, 1990) – "Birdshead (live)"
- Alvin Lives (In Leeds): Anti Poll Tax Trax (Midnight Music, May 1990) – "Kung Fu Fighting"
- The Best of Mountain Stage, Volume 2: Live (Blue Plate Music, 1991) – "The Arms Of Love"
- The Bob No. 42 (1991) – "A Day In The Life"
- The Bob No. 54 (1997) – "Alright, Yeah (German version)"
- Succour: The Terrascope Benefit Album (Flydaddy Records, September 1996) – "She Was Sinister But She Was Happy"
- More Oar: A Tribute to the Skip Spence Album (Birdman Records, 1999) – "Broken Heart"
- Ernie: Songs of Ernest Noyes Brookings (Gadfly Records, 2001) – "Book"
- Listen to What the Man Said: Popular Artists Pay Tribute to the Music of Paul McCartney (Oglio Records, 2001) – "Let Me Roll It"
- Wig in a Box (Off Records, October 2003) – "City Of Women"
- Terry Edwards Presents... Queer Street: No Fish Is Too Weird for Her Aquarium Vol. III (Sartorial Records, February 2004) – "Are 'Friends' Electric?"
- This One's for the Fellows: A Sonic Salute to the Young Fresh Fellows (BlueDisguise Records, April 2004) – "Mamie Dunn, Employee of the Month / Good Times Rock & Roll"
- Live at WMSE Vol. 10 (April 2009) – "NY Doll"
- Abbey Road Now! (Mojo Magazine Free CD, October 2009) – "I Want You (She's So Heavy)"
- The Madcap Laughs Again! (Mojo Magazine Free CD, Mar 2010) – "Dark Globe"
- All Ready for the 25th? (Sartorial Records, 2012) – "There Ain't No Santa Claus on the Evenin' Stage"
- Son of Rogues Gallery: Pirate Ballads, Sea Songs & Chanteys (ANTI-Records, February 2013) – "Sam's Gone Away"
- Way To Blue: The Songs Of Nick Drake (Story Sound Records, April 2013) – "Parasite"
- Songs in the Key of Paul (Mojo Magazine free CD, November 2013) – "Let Me Roll It"
- An Autumn Almanac (Uncut Magazine free CD, December 2010) Robyn Hitchcock and the Venus 3 – "Belltown Ramble"
- Ramble On! (Uncut Magazine free CD, September 2014) – "Trouble in Your Blood"

=== Charting albums ===
| Year | Album | Peak chart positions |
| Year | Album | Billboard 200 (US) |
|---|---|---|
| 1988 | Globe of Frogs | 111 |
| 1989 | Queen Elvis | 139 |

=== Charting singles ===
| Year | Title | Peak chart positions | Album |
| Year | Title | Alternative (Modern Rock Tracks) (US) | Album |
|---|---|---|---|
| 1989 | "Madonna of the Wasps" | 2 | Queen Elvis |
| 1991 | "So You Think You're in Love" | 1 | Perspex Island |
| 1991 | "Oceanside" | 29 | Perspex Island |
| 1992 | "Ultra Unbeleivable Love" | 23 | Perspex Island |
| 1993 | "Driving Aloud (Radio Storm)" | 19 | Respect |

== Sources ==
- Hitchcock, Robyn (28 June 2024). 1967: How I Got There and Why I Never Left. London, England: Constable. ISBN 978-1-4087-2055-4.
