= Queen Elvis =

Studio album by Robyn Hitchcock and The Egyptians
- Released: February 28, 1989
- Genre: Alternative rock
- Length: 46:26
- Label: A&M
- Producer: Robyn Hitchcock, Andy Metcalfe

Robyn Hitchcock chronology
Globe of Frogs (1988)	Queen Elvis (1989)	Eye (1990)

Professional ratings
Review scores
Source	Rating
AllMusic	4/5 stars
Chicago Tribune	3.5/4 stars
Los Angeles Times	3/5 stars
Rolling Stone	4/5 stars
The Rolling Stone Album Guide	4/5 stars

Queen Elvis is the seventh studio album by English musician Robyn Hitchcock, released on A&M Records in 1989. It is his fourth studio album to be released with his band The Egyptians.

Having signed to A&M in 1988, this second set for the label was unreleased in Hitchcock's home country the UK. The album's cover depicts Hitchcock in a red telephone box, illuminated from the inside. Tracks 11 and 12 below are remixes of 2 album tracks ("Veins of the Queen" and "Freeze"), and were included on the original A&M US CD release.

The track "Queen Elvis" appears on his next album, Eye, with a second version "Queen Elvis II" available as a bonus track.

== Track listing ==
All songs written by Robyn Hitchcock.

1. "Madonna of the Wasps" – 3:05
2. "The Devils Coachman" – 2:33
3. "Wax Doll" – 4:12
4. "Knife" – 3:24
5. "Swirling" – 3:38
6. "One Long Pair of Eyes" – 4:57
7. "Veins of the Queen" – 3:24
8. "Freeze" – 4:46
9. "Autumn Sea" – 4:23
10. "Superman" – 3:48
11. "Veins of the Queen" (Royal mix) – 4:00
12. "Freeze" (Shatter mix) – 4:16

== Charts ==
Chart performance for Queen Elvis
Chart (1989)	Peak position
US Billboard 200	139

=== Singles ===
Year	Song	Chart	Position
1991	"Madonna of the Wasps"	Alternative (Modern Rock Tracks) (US)	2
