= Storefront Hitchcock =

1998 American film by Jonathan Demme

- DVD cover
- Directed by: Jonathan Demme
- Produced by: Peter Saraf
- Starring: Robyn Hitchcock
- Edited by: Andy Keir
- Music by: Robyn Hitchcock
- Production company: Orion Pictures
- Distributed by: MGM Distribution Co. (United States); United International Pictures (international)
- Release dates: March 19, 1998 (SXSW Film Festival); November 18, 1998 (United States)
- Running time: 77 minutes
- Country: United States
- Language: English

Storefront Hitchcock is a 1998 American concert film featuring Robyn Hitchcock and directed by Jonathan Demme. It was conceived as "a document not a documentary", and the performance was shot in New York City in December 1996, in an abandoned used clothing store on 14th Street. Over the course of the performance, simple props and set pieces are varied, such as a bare lightbulb and a tomato sculpture, and occasionally a passerby on the street glances in.

Demme met Hitchcock after he attended a live show and offered to direct a live performance video for a song, which was then revised to be a full concert. Demme was inspired to film in the storefront setting by a Hungarian theatre group, Squat Theatre, who operated in New York City in the 1970s and 80s and typically performed in a storefront against a large plate glass window facing the street.

Demme subsequently cast Hitchcock in small roles in two other films, The Manchurian Candidate and Rachel Getting Married, and used one of his songs in The Truth About Charlie.

== Setlist ==
All songs composed by Robyn Hitchcock.

1. "Devil's Radio"
2. "1974"
3. "Filthy Bird"
4. "Let's Go Thundering"
5. "I'm Only You"
6. "Glass Hotel"
7. "I Something You"
8. "The Yip! Song"
9. "I Am Not Me"
10. "You and Oblivion"
11. "Airscape"
12. "Freeze"
13. "Alright Yeah"
14. "No, I Don't Remember Guildford"

== Personnel ==
- Robyn Hitchcock - vocals, acoustic guitar, electric guitar, harmonica
- Tim Keegan - guitar, vocals
- Deni Bonet - violin

== Release ==
The film premiered at the SXSW Film Festival on March 19, 1998. It was funded by Orion Pictures just before it declared bankruptcy and was bought by MGM, and did not receive the hoped-for distribution or promotion in the United States. In Hitchcock's words, "when MGM kind of unzipped their stomachs to see what they'd swallowed, they pulled out Orion, and they cut open Orion's stomach. And inside Orion's stomach was wriggling Storefront Hitchcock, a little kind of minuscule million-dollar project that MGM wasn't particularly interested in." In fact, in its original US release, it only played in one theater in New York City, Film Forum, for one week starting on November 18, 1998.

The film was released on DVD in 2000 by MGM.

== Reception ==
Dennis Harvey in Variety said that Hitchcock's "rich, supple voice shines, and his seemingly impromptu between-song patter suggests a pleasing form of mild insanity" also saying that "the songs are the real attraction here, and they provide a good overview of a large personal catalog." Stephen Holden in The New York Times wrote that the film "captures the sensibility of this smart, quirky folk-rocker in the most appealing possible light", while Scott Tobias in The A.V. Club wrote that "Demme's relaxed, ego-free direction is a reminder that the quirky humanist behind Melvin and Howard and Married to the Mob hasn't lost his touch", and "his clean, elegant compositions enhance the intimacy of the performance". However, Douglas Wolk of The Village Voice described it as a "simple but nicely presented document of a middling Hitchcock solo performance", complaining that "the set list dips generously into his lamest recent material".
