= Globe of Frogs =

Studio album by Robyn Hitchcock and The Egyptians
- Released: 1988
- Recorded: 1987
- Studio: Alaska Studios and The Greenhouse
- Genre: Rock
- Length: 36:07
- Label: A&M
- Producer: Pat Collier; Robyn Hitchcock; Andy Metcalfe; Morris Windsor

Robyn Hitchcock and The Egyptians chronology
Element of Light (1986)	Globe of Frogs (1988)	Queen Elvis (1989)

Professional ratings
Review scores
Source	Rating
AllMusic	3.5/5 stars
Chicago Sun-Times	3.5/4 stars
Chicago Tribune	2/4 stars
Los Angeles Times	3/4 stars
NME	5/10
Rolling Stone	4/5 stars
The Rolling Stone Album Guide	3/5 stars

Globe of Frogs is the sixth album released by Robyn Hitchcock and his third with his backing band The Egyptians, released on A&M Records in 1988. Made in London, it was recorded by the Egyptians (Robyn Hitchcock, Andy Metcalfe, and Morris Windsor) along with Pat Collier, and emerged as the group's debut after signing to major label A&M.

The album features Peter Buck from R.E.M. guesting on guitar as well as Squeeze's Glenn Tilbrook dueting with Hitchcock on "Flesh Number One (Beatle Dennis)". Frequent Hitchcock collaborator Chris Cox also appears.

The album also includes the minor college radio hit "Balloon Man". Originally written for The Bangles, the single reached #1 on Gavin Report's Alternative music chart. Despite this, when asked if he hated any of his own songs in an A.V. Club interview in 2013, Hitchcock said it was a song he'd "be happy to never hear again, although I do like the money I get from the royalties."

"Chinese Bones" has proved perhaps the most durable from the album, becoming one of Hitchcock's more frequently performed concert numbers.

The album was packaged in dark green, with one of Hitchcock's paintings on the front. The sleeve notes consist of his "manifesto" in which Hitchcock advocates "the organic" as opposed to the big business of "insanity" and implores listeners to bury their televisions:

"All of us exist in a swarming, pulsating world, driven mostly by an unconscious that we ignore and misunderstand. Within the framework of 'civilisation' we remain as savage as possible. Against the dense traffic of modern life, we fortify our animal selves with video violence, imaginary sex, and music...but our inflamed and disoriented psyches smoulder on beneath the wet leaves of habit."

== Track listing ==
1. "Tropical Flesh Mandala"
2. "Vibrating"
3. "Balloon Man"
4. "Luminous Rose"
5. "Sleeping with Your Devil Mask"
6. "Unsettled"
7. "Chinese Bones"
8. "A Globe of Frogs"
9. "The Shapes Between Us Turn into Animals"
10. "Flesh Number One (Beatle Dennis)"

== Personnel ==
- Robyn Hitchcock: vocals, guitars, piano, harmonica
- Andy Metcalf: bass guitar, accordion, keyboards, backing vocals
- Morris Windsor: drums, backing vocals

with guests:

- Chris Cox: Mandolin
- Peter Buck: guitar
- Glenn Tilbrook: harmony vocals

== Charts ==
Chart performance for Globe of Frogs
Chart (1988)	Peak position
US Billboard 200	111
