= Perspex Island =

1991 album by Robyn Hitchcock & The Egyptians

Studio album by Robyn Hitchcock and The Egyptians
- Released: 1991
- Genre: Alternative rock
- Label: Go! Discs
- Producer: Paul Fox

Robyn Hitchcock chronology
| Eye (1990) | Perspex Island (1991) | Respect (1993) |

Perspex Island is the ninth studio album by English musician Robyn Hitchcock and his fifth with backing band, The Egyptians, released on Go! Discs in 1991.

The group's third under their contract to A&M Records, it contains eleven Hitchcock originals. It was recorded in Los Angeles in 1991, and features guest appearances by Hitchcock fans Michael Stipe and Peter Buck of R.E.M. The associated single "So You Think You're in Love" peaked #1 on the Modern Rock Tracks chart in the U.S.

The album carries a Hitchcock oil painting on its front cover, depicting the mythological figure Thoth, which The Egyptians had once used as a group logo.

== Reception ==
Professional ratings
Review scores
| Source | Rating |
|---|---|
| AllMusic | 3/5 stars |
| Chicago Tribune | 3/4 stars |
| Entertainment Weekly | B+ |
| NME | 5/10 |
| The Rolling Stone Album Guide | 4.5/5 stars |
| Select | 4/5 |

Perspex Island received generally positive reviews, though it was not as well-received as many of Hitchcock's other albums. Stewart Mason's review for AllMusic stated the "glossy sound doesn't obscure the typically high quality of Hitchcock's songs, and there are times... where the two complement each other perfectly". In a 1991 review for Entertainment Weekly, Gina Arnold wrote that "Longtime fans... may find they miss Hitchcock's impenetrable surreal lyrics, which always seemed to mask deep and moving insights", though she named "Ultra Unbelievable Love" and "Earthly Paradise" as highlights.

== Track listing ==
All tracks composed by Robyn Hitchcock.

1. "Oceanside" – 3:48
2. "So You Think You're in Love" – 2:34
3. "Birds in Perspex" – 3:54
4. "Ultra Unbelievable Love" – 3:49
5. "Vegetation and Dimes" – 4:58
6. "Lysander" – 4:36
7. "Child of the Universe" – 4:21
8. "She Doesn't Exist" – 4:25
9. "Ride" – 5:04
10. "If You Go Away" – 4:55
11. "Earthly Paradise" – 6:34

=== Singles ===
| Year | Song | Chart | Position |
|---|---|---|---|
| 1991 | "So You Think You're in Love" | Alternative (Modern Rock Tracks) (US) | 1 |
| 1991 | "Oceanside" | Alternative (Modern Rock Tracks) (US) | 29 |
| 1992 | "Ultra Unbeleivable Love" | Alternative (Modern Rock Tracks) (US) | 23 |
