= Invisible Hitchcock =

1986 outtakes album by Robyn Hitchcock

Compilation album by Robyn Hitchcock
- Released: 1986
- Recorded: 1981–1985
- Genre: Rock
- Length: 69:19 (CD version)
- Label: Glass Fish

Professional ratings
Review scores
Source	Rating
AllMusic	4/5 stars
Trouser Press	Favorable

Invisible Hitchcock is a studio album by Robyn Hitchcock. A collection of leftovers and out-takes recorded from 1981 to 1985, Hitchcock's sleeve notes explain that the album was assembled because the songs "didn't fit in with what I was doing at the time and do fit in with each other now".

The US version of the LP (on Relativity) replaced "It's a Mystic Trip" with "Grooving on a Inner Plane". The CD versions of the album omit "Grooving on a Inner Plane" but include additional tracks. Some CD versions of the Glass Fish release incorrectly labeled on the disk as "Element of Light". All other information was listed correctly.

== Track listing ==
All songs written by Robyn Hitchcock

=== Side one ===
1. "All I Wanna Do Is Fall in Love" – 3:46
2. "Give Me a Spanner, Ralph" – 2:36
3. "A Skull, a Suitcase, and a Long Red Bottle of Wine" – 4:58
4. "My Favourite Buildings" – 3:12
5. "It's a Mystic Trip" – 2:57 [UK LP] / "Grooving on a Inner Plane" (alternate version) – 4:10 [US LP]
6. "The Pit of Souls" (country version) – 5:56

=== Side two ===
1. "Trash" – 2:51
2. "Mr. Deadly" – 4:13
3. "Star of Hairs" – 3:15
4. "I Got a Message For You" – 3:05
5. "Vegetable Friend" – 2:12
6. "Point It at Gran" – 2:02
7. "Let There Be More Darkness" – 2:57
8. "Blues in A" – 3:26

=== Glass Fish CD (1986) bonus tracks ===
1. "Falling Leaves" – 4:25
2. "Eaten by Her Own Dinner" – 4:28
3. "Messages of Dark" – 3:51
4. "The Abandoned Brain" – 2:53

=== Rhino CD (1995) bonus tracks ===
1. "Falling Leaves" – 4:25
2. "Eaten by Her Own Dinner" – 4:28
3. "Messages of Dark" – 3:51
4. "The Abandoned Brain" – 2:53
5. "Listening to the Higsons" – 2:46
6. "Dr. Sticky" – 3:33
