= Shadow Cat =

2008 outtakes album by Robyn Hitchcock

Compilation album by Robyn Hitchcock
- Released: 2008
- Genre: Alternative rock
- Label: Sartorial
- Producer: Robyn Hitchcock

Professional ratings
Review scores
Source	Rating
Allmusic	3.5/5 stars

Shadow Cat is an album by Robyn Hitchcock, released in England in 2008.

This was released in the UK by Sartorial Records, distributed by Cargo, and is available in America through Red Eye distribution. The set contains otherwise unavailable titles, as well as an edited version of 'Statue With a Walkman' (63 seconds shorter, and omitting the spoken-word interludes featured in the original).

== Track listing ==
1. "For Debbie Reynolds"
2. "Never Have to See You Again"
3. "Love Affair"
4. "The Wind Cries Mary"
5. "High On Yourself"
6. "Because You're Over"
7. "The Cat Walks Her Kind of Line"
8. "Statue With a Walkman"
9. "The Green Boy"
10. "Real Dot"
11. "Nothing But Time"
12. "Beautiful Shock"
13. "Baby-Doll"
14. "Shadow Cat"
