= Fegmania! =

1985 album by Robyn Hitchcock & The Egyptians

Studio album by Robyn Hitchcock and the Egyptians
- Released: March 1985
- Recorded: Alaska Studios, Waterloo, London
- Genre: Jangle pop; psychedelic folk
- Length: 73:54
- Label: Midnight Music; Slash; Rhino; YepRoc
- Producer: Robyn Hitchcock and the Egyptians

Robyn Hitchcock and the Egyptians chronology
I Often Dream of Trains (1984)	Fegmania! (1985)	Gotta Let This Hen Out! (1985)

Professional ratings
Review scores
Source	Rating
AllMusic	4.5/5 stars
Chicago Tribune	4/4 stars
The Rolling Stone Album Guide	4/5 stars

Fegmania! is the fourth studio album by Robyn Hitchcock and his first with his backing band The Egyptians.

The Egyptians included the former Soft Boys Andy Metcalfe and Morris Windsor.

"The Man with the Lightbulb Head" was conceived on Archway Road in London and provided a springboard for Hitchcock's first attempt at film making for a promotional video. Stills from the video were reproduced as cover art for the front and back of the LP sleeve.

The album was quickly followed by the live album, Gotta Let This Hen Out!, recorded at one gig at The Marquee Club in Wardour Street, London.

== Reissues ==
Eight bonus tracks were added to the subsequent Rhino CD reissue of the album, including an acoustic demo of "Insect Mother" which had been recorded for possible inclusion in the earlier I Often Dream of Trains, and "The Pit of Souls", a lengthy psychedelic instrumental in four 'movements'. Two alternative versions of "Egyptian Cream" appear as bonus tracks.

The 2008 YepRoc reissue added seven bonus track to the original album. The outro which previously appeared as a hidden track after "Heaven" is now included as a separate, twelfth untitled song. This reissue was also included in the retrospective Robyn Hitchcock & the Egyptians boxset Luminous Groove.

== Reception ==
John Leland of Spin wrote, "Unpredictably brilliant songs, synapse-bending lyrics, and vigorously inventive guitar. This is still the music of a man who refuses to grow up, but however dark Hitchcock's paranoid delusions, all of his songs have pretty elements: a Merseybeat harmony, a pristine organ part, or a neatly resolved guitar line."

== Track listing ==
All songs written by Robyn Hitchcock except as indicated.

=== Side one ===
1. "Egyptian Cream" – 3:33
2. "Another Bubble" – 2:46
3. "I'm Only You" – 4:28
4. "My Wife & My Dead Wife" – 4:19
5. "Goodnight I Say" – 3:14

=== Side two ===
1. "The Man with the Lightbulb Head" – 3:05
2. "Insect Mother" – 1:54
3. "Strawberry Mind" – 2:50
4. "Glass" – 3:12
5. "The Fly" – 3:50
6. "Heaven" – 4:41

=== Midnight CD bonus tracks ===
1. "Bells of Rhymney" (Idris Davies, Pete Seeger; arranged by Roger McGuinn)) – 3:30 (single)
2. "Dwarfbeat" – 3:00 (B-side from "Heaven" single)
3. "Some Body" – 3:24 (B-side from "Heaven" single)

=== Rhino CD reissue bonus tracks ===
1. "Bells of Rhymney" (Idris Davies, Pete Seeger) – 3:30
2. "Dwarfbeat" – 3:00
3. "Some Body" – 3:24
4. "Egyptian Cream" [Demo] – 4:35
5. "Heaven" [Live]
6. "Insect Mother" [Demo] – 4:53
7. "Egyptian Cream" [Live]
8. "The Pit of Souls [Parts I-IV]" – 9:57

=== YepRoc CD reissue bonus tracks ===
1. "Bells of Rhymney" (Idris Davies, Pete Seeger) – 3:30
2. "Some Body" – 3:20
3. "Heaven" [Live] – 4:55
4. "The Pit of Souls [I-IV]" – 9:59
5. "The Drowning Church" – 3:12
6. "The Man with the Lightbulb Head" [Instrumental] – 2:52
7. "Lady Obvious" – 3:21

Note: "Dwarfbeat" was dropped from this release.

== Personnel ==
Robyn Hitchcock and the Egyptians

- Robyn Hitchcock - vocals, guitars, bass guitar on "The Man with the Lightbulb Head"
- Morris Windsor - drums
- Andy Metcalfe - bass guitar, keyboards on "I'm Only You", "My Wife & My Dead Wife", "Goodnight I Say", "Insect Mother" and "Heaven"
- Roger Jackson - keyboards on "Strawberry Mind", "Glass", "The Fly" and "Heaven"

with:

- John Kingham - drums on "The Man with the Lightbulb Head"
- James Fletcher - saxophone on "Dwarfbeat"
- James A. Smith - guitar on "The Pit of Souls" Part I
- Justin Grimaldi - guitar on "The Pit of Souls" part II

Technical

- Pat Collier - recording
