= Robyn Hitchcock (2017 album) =

2017 album by Robyn Hitchcock

Studio album by Robyn Hitchcock
- Released: 21 April 2017
- Studios: Readymade Studios, Nashville
- Genres: Psychedelic rock, pop rock
- Label: Yep Roc
- Producers: Robyn Hitchcock, Brendan Benson

Robyn Hitchcock chronology
The Man Upstairs (2014)	Robyn Hitchcock (2017)	Planet England (2019)

Professional ratings
Aggregate scores
Source	Rating
Metacritic	(80/100)
Review scores
Source	Rating
AllMusic	4/5 stars
Paste Magazine	8.7 stars on a 10 point scale

Robyn Hitchcock is the twenty-first studio album by British musician Robyn Hitchcock. It was released in 2017 through Yep Roc. The album, largely rooted in psychedelic rock, represents a stylistic change from his previous LP, The Man Upstairs, which was entirely acoustic.

== Reception ==
The album received generally positive reviews. Jon Young, writing for Paste Magazine, noted that the album "feels familiar and utterly fresh at once", also being "a perfect summation of the artist, as the title suggests". AllMusic reviewer James Christopher Monger called it "easily his most vibrant collection of new music since the early 1990s".

== Track listing ==
All compositions by Robyn Hitchcock.

1. "I Want to Tell You About What I Want"
2. "Virginia Woolf"
3. "I Pray When I'm Drunk"
4. "Mad Shelley's Letterbox"
5. "Sayonara Judge"
6. "Detective Mindhorn"
7. "1970 in Aspic"
8. "Raymond and the Wires"
9. "Autumn Sunglasses"
10. "Time Coast"

== Personnel ==
- Robyn Hitchcock – guitar, keyboards, vocals
- Anne McCue – guitar
- Jon Estes – bass
- Jon Radford – drums
- Russ Pahl – pedal steel
- Emma Swift & Pat Sansone – harmony vocals on "Sayonara Judge", "Time Coast", "Detective Mindhorn", and "1970 In Aspic"
- Grant Lee Phillips – harmonies on "I Pray When I'm Drunk" and "Raymond And The Wires"
- Gillian Welch – harmonies on "Autumn Sunglasses"
