= Element of Light =

1986 album by Robyn Hitchcock & The Egyptians

Studio album by Robyn Hitchcock and The Egyptians
- Released: 1986
- Recorded: Alaska Studios; Berry Street Studios; Live recordings at The Town & Country Club
- Genre: Rock
- Length: 68:31
- Label: Midnight Music; Relativity; Rhino
- Producer: Robyn Hitchcock & Andy Metcalfe

Robyn Hitchcock and The Egyptians chronology
Gotta Let This Hen Out! (1985)	Element of Light (1986)	Globe of Frogs (1988)

Professional ratings
Review scores
Source	Rating
AllMusic	4.5/5 stars
Chicago Tribune	3.5/4 stars
The Rolling Stone Album Guide	4.5/5 stars
Sounds	4/5 stars

Element of Light is the fifth studio album by singer-songwriter Robyn Hitchcock and his second with his backing band, the Egyptians. It was released in 1986.

Most of the album was recorded at Alaska Studios and Berry Street, but two tracks, "The President" and "Lady Waters & The Hooded One", were live recordings made for the BBC, with overdubs recorded on BBC Mobile and at Alaska.

The album title derives from the song "Airscape", which has been cited several times by Hitchcock as a favourite among his own compositions, and a live rendition was tagged on to later CD editions. "Airscape" concerns his "favourite beach", Compton Beach on the Isle of Wight, which also provided a backdrop for the cover shots. He was inspired by learning about the erosion of the cliffs, and imagining the ghosts of people who had walked the cliffs centuries ago now suspended over the water.

The song "The President" makes reference to Ronald Reagan's visit to Bitburg, where members of the Waffen-SS were buried. In 2020 he re-recorded the song with altered lyrics referring to then-U.S. President Donald Trump.

The song "Raymond Chandler Evening" is an homage to the world-weary novels of mystery writer Raymond Chandler. The title was later used as the name for a sidequest in Cyberpunk 2077 also homaging the author.

Originally running to ten songs, the first CD edition included extra bonus tracks, all taken from singles, while later pressings have added a further six, including the comedic spoken number "The Can Opener".

The album was produced by Robyn and Andy Metcalfe, with input from long-time colleague Pat Collier.

== Track listing ==
All songs written by Robyn Hitchcock.

=== Side one ===
1. "If You Were a Priest"
2. "Winchester"
3. "Somewhere Apart"
4. "Ted, Woody and Junior"
5. "The President"

=== Side two ===
1. "Raymond Chandler Evening"
2. "Bass"
3. "Airscape"
4. "Never Stop Bleeding"
5. "Lady Waters & the Hooded One"

=== Midnight CD bonus tracks ===
1. "The Black Crow Knows"
2. "The Crawling"
3. "The Leopard"
4. "Tell Me About Your Drugs"

=== Rhino CD reissue bonus tracks ===
1. "The Black Crow Knows"
2. "The Crawling"
3. "The Leopard"
4. "Tell Me About Your Drugs"
5. "The Can Opener"
6. "Raymond Chandler Evening" (Demo)
7. "The President" (Demo)
8. "If You Were a Priest" (Demo)
9. "Airscape" (Live)
10. "The Leopard" (Demo)

=== YepRoc CD reissue bonus tracks ===
1. "The Black Crow Knows"
2. "The Crawling"
3. "The Leopard"
4. "Tell Me About Your Drugs"
5. "Sprinkling Dots"
6. "Upside Down Church Blues"
7. "Into It"
8. "Neck"
9. "Bass" (Demo)
10. "Lady Waters Mix 1" ("Lady Waters & The Hooded One" demo)"

== Personnel ==
- Robyn Hitchcock – guitar, vocals, upright piano on "Somewhere Apart", bass on "Tell Me About Your Drugs"
- Andy Metcalfe – bass, vocals on "If You Were A Priest", "Winchester", "Ted, Woody and Junior", "Bass", "Airscape", "Lady Waters & the Hooded One", "The Black Crow Knows", "Tell Me About Your Drugs", piano on "Winchester", "Ted, Woody and Junior", bass keyboard on "Raymond Chandler Evening", keyboards on "Never Stop Bleeding" and "The Leopard", drums on "Tell Me About Your Drugs"
- Morris Windsor – drums, vocals on "Ted, Woody and Junior", "Bass", "Airscape" and "Lady Waters & the Hooded One", electric guitar on "Tell Me About Your Drugs"
- Roger Jackson – keyboards, glass harmonica on "Airscape", vocals on "Lady Waters & the Hooded One"
