= Eye (Robyn Hitchcock album) =

1990 album by Robyn Hitchcock

Studio album by Robyn Hitchcock
- Released: March 12, 1990
- Recorded: 1988–89
- Studio: Hyde Street Studios, San Francisco
- Genre: Folk rock
- Length: 63:57
- Label: Twin/Tone

Robyn Hitchcock chronology
Queen Elvis (1989)	Eye (1990)	Perspex Island (1991)

Professional ratings
Review scores
Source	Rating
AllMusic	4/5 stars
Chicago Sun-Times	4/4 stars
Chicago Tribune	3.5/4 stars
Entertainment Weekly	A−
The Rolling Stone Album Guide	3.5/5 stars
Select	4/5

Eye is the eighth studio album and fourth solo album by Robyn Hitchcock. It was released in 1990 on Glass Fish (UK) and Twin/Tone Records (US). This was Hitchcock's only solo album released between 1985 and 1995, a period in which he recorded most of his music with his backing band, the Egyptians.

Hitchcock wrote in 2025, "Eye was my attempt to be personal, and vulnerable, inasmuch as my uptight English carapace would allow. ... I was in the throes of breaking up with two people at once ... On Eye I did my best to capture those ugly feelings and bottle them raw, like acid fireflies, forever flaming in my repertoire."

Eye was recorded acoustically in the style of I Often Dream of Trains (1984) with which it shares a similar green/gold sleeve design, and could therefore be seen as a sequel piece. Eye is entirely self-composed and ran to fourteen songs (vinyl) and eighteen (CD). Hitchcock plays all instruments (mostly guitars), and sings all the vocals.

Eye was reissued in 1995 by Rhino and added the tracks "Raining Twilight Coast (demo)", "Agony of Pleasure (demo)", and "Queen Elvis (demo)". A third CD edition saw the previous demo bonus tracks dropped, along with "College of Ice", while adding yet more.

== Track listing ==
All songs written by Robyn Hitchcock.

=== Side one ===
1. "Cynthia Mask" – 4:35
2. "Certainly Clickot" – 2:14
3. "Queen Elvis" – 4:22
4. "Flesh Cartoons" – 4:22
5. "Chinese Water Python" – 2:12
6. "Executioner" – 3:43
7. "Linctus House" – 5:12

=== Side two ===
1. "Beautiful Girl" – 2:12
2. "Raining Twilight Coast" – 4:38
3. "Clean Steve" – 3:51
4. "Agony of Pleasure" – 2:23
5. "Glass Hotel" – 3:26
6. "Satellite" – 1:43
7. "Aquarium" – 4:19

=== 1st issue CD bonus tracks ===
1. "Sweet Ghost of Light" – 3:07
2. "College of Ice" – 3:41
3. "Transparent Lover" – 3:35
4. "Queen Elvis II" – 4:37

=== 2nd issue CD bonus tracks (Rhino Records 1995) ===
1. "Sweet Ghost of Light" – 3:07
2. "College of Ice" – 3:41
3. "Transparent Lover" – 3:35
4. "Queen Elvis II" – 4:22
5. "Raining Twilight Coast" (Demo) – 4:38
6. "Agony of Pleasure" (Demo) – 2:40
7. "Queen Elvis" (Demo) – 4:32

=== 3rd issue CD bonus tracks (Yep Roc Records 2007) ===
1. "Sweet Ghost of Light" – 3:07
2. "Transparent Lover" – 3:35
3. "Queen Elvis II" – 4:22
4. "Century" – 3:41
5. "Shimmering Distant Love" – 3:21
6. "Lovers Turn to Skulls" – 1:40
7. "The Beauty of Earls Court" – 3:59

The sleeve notes erroneously omit the first two bonus tracks.
"College of Ice", "Raining Twilight Coast" (Demo), "Queen Elvis" (Demo) moved to "While Thatcher Mauled Britain".
"Agony of Pleasure" (Demo) dropped.
