= Respect (Robyn Hitchcock album) =

1993 album by Robyn Hitchcock & The Egyptians

Studio album by Robyn Hitchcock and the Egyptians
- Released: 23 February 1993 (US)
- Recorded: 1992
- Genre: Alternative rock
- Label: A&M
- Producer: John Leckie

Robyn Hitchcock and the Egyptians chronology
| Perspex Island (1991) | Respect (1993) | Moss Elixir (1996) |

Singles from Respect
- 1. "Driving Aloud (Radio Storm)" Released: 1993

Professional ratings
Review scores
| Source | Rating |
|---|---|
| AllMusic | 3.5/5 stars |
| Chicago Tribune | 3/4 stars |
| Entertainment Weekly | A− |
| Rolling Stone | 4/5 stars |
| The Rolling Stone Album Guide | 4/5 stars |

Respect is the tenth studio album by Robyn Hitchcock and his sixth with backing band, the Egyptians, released on A&M in 1993.

== Background ==
"Respect" was the group's fourth and final studio album under contract to A&M, and Hitchcock's last record with the Egyptians. The album contains ten Hitchcock originals.

The album has a Hitchcock oil painting on its front cover entitled "Red Lemon Days", which was the original title for the album. The release includes a Hitchcock written short story, "Moose Mark and the Prince of Cones", in its inlay.

The album was written and recorded in the period following the death of Hitchcock's father, and several songs reflect this explicitly, particularly the opening track.

A promotional version of the album titled "Spectre: Robyn Hitchcock Explains the Songs on 'Respect'" was released by A&M records. On this version each song is preceded by a brief spoken commentary by Robyn exploring the track's lyrical themes and song structure.

== Recording ==
The album was recorded using a mobile studio, hired from the BBC, at Hitchcock's home in Yarmouth on the Isle of Wight. Hitchcock explained the decision by saying, "I've never really cared much for going in and recording in the studio, so it seemed like the easiest solution was to have the studio come to record with us." The band rehearsed at the house over the summer and then when it came time to record, the group and their respective wives, family and friends all stayed at the house while production took place. Most of the recording was done in the living room, where the furniture had been removed and carpets pulled up. The kitchen was chosen for the vocals because of its good acoustics.

Hitchcock has said that he does not like the record. Although he thinks the songs are good he was not happy with the result. He partly blames this on how unsettled his life was at that time, saying: "I was ... at a bit of a fault line in my life. I was going back and forth across the Atlantic all the time, and wasn’t really properly focused on how it came out." The extended time it took to record the album meant that he lost focus and since then has made a point of making records in short two- or three-day bursts.

== Track listing ==
1. "The Yip Song" — 3:08
2. "Arms of Love" — 4:19
3. "The Moon Inside" — 4:28
4. "Railway Shoes" — 3:35
5. "When I Was Dead" — 3:34
6. "The Wreck of the Arthur Lee" — 3:29
7. "Driving Aloud (Radio Storm)" — 3:59
8. "Serpent at the Gates of Wisdom" — 4:09
9. "Then You're Dust" — 2:30
10. "Wafflehead" — 4:03

== Personnel ==
- Robyn Hitchcock - vocals, guitar, harmonica and phone calls, vocal bass drum on "Wafflehead"
- Andy Metcalfe - harmonies, bass guitar, keyboards, computer, water jug on "Wafflehead", wine glasses and harmony serpent guitar on "Arms of Love"
- Morris Windsor - harmonies, digital drums, percussion, cheese grater on "Wafflehead", sauce and frying pans on "Driving Aloud", acoustic 12-string on "Then You're Dust"

Additional personnel

Musicians:

- Roddy Lorrimer - trumpet on "Arms of Love" and "The Wreck of the Arthur Lee"
- Bill Lyons - shawm on "When I Was Dead"
- Electra Strings on "The Wreck of the Arthur Lee" and "The Yip Song"

Electra Strings:

- Sonia Slany - 1st violin
- Ann Wood - 2nd violin
- Jocelyn Pook - viola
- Caroline Lavelle - cello

BBC Transcription Unit Recording Engineers

- Gareth Watson
- Peregrine Andrews

=== Singles ===
| Year | Song | Chart | Position |
|---|---|---|---|
| 1991 | "Driving Aloud (Radio Storm)" | Alternative (Modern Rock Tracks) (US) | 19 |
