= The Kershaw Sessions (Robyn Hitchcock album) =

1994 live album by Robyn Hitchcock and the Egyptians

Live album by Robyn Hitchcock and the Egyptians
- Released: 1994
- Recorded: 1985–1991
- Genre: Alternative rock
- Label: BBC Radio Recordings

The Kershaw Sessions is an album by Robyn Hitchcock and the Egyptians, comprising nineteen titles recorded live between 1985 and 1991. The album was released in 1994.

The 'Kershaw' of the title refers to UK radio DJ Andy Kershaw, although not all of the sessions were recorded for his show. Two, "Brenda's Iron Sledge" and the ever-popular "Heaven", were in fact pulled from the group's much earlier live album Gotta Let This Hen Out.

The tracks are all Hitchcock originals which had been recorded and released previously, bar "Open the Door, Homer", covered from Bob Dylan's The Basement Tapes and a jokey reading of "The Banana Boat Song". This is the only Hitchcock album on which either may be heard.

Sleeve notes are by group members Andy Metcalfe and Morris Windsor.

== Track listing ==
1. "Brenda's Iron Sledge" (3:45)
2. "Veins of the Queen" (3:35)
3. "Lady Waters and the Hooded One" (5:46)
4. "So You Think You're in Love" (2:33)
5. "Bass" (2:45)
6. "Sleeping with Your Devil Mask" (3:17)
7. "Open the Door, Homer" (3:05)
8. "52 Stations" (3:47)
9. "Birds in Perspex" (3:35)
10. "If You Were a Priest" (2:50)
11. "Acid Bird" (4:20)
12. "Arms of Love" (3:48)
13. "Superman" (3:35)
14. "Tropical Flesh Mandala" (2:55)
15. "Oceanside" (3:37)
16. "Madonna of the Wasps" (3:25)
17. "The Banana Boat Song" (1:40)
18. "Listening to the Higsons" (2:35)
19. "Heaven" (3:52)
