= Black Snake Diamond Röle =

1981 album by Robyn Hitchcock

Black Snake Dîamond Röle

Studio album by Robyn Hitchcock
- Released: May 1981
- Recorded: June 1980–January 1981
- Studio: The Barge; Alaska Studios, Waterloo, London; Music Works, London N7
- Genre: Neo-psychedelia
- Length: 57:49
- Label: Armageddon
- Producer: Pat Collier; Matthew Seligman; Jim Neill (reissue)

Robyn Hitchcock chronology
Black Snake Dîamond Röle (1981)	Groovy Decay (1982)

Professional ratings
Review scores
Source	Rating
AllMusic	3.5/5 stars
Chicago Sun-Times	3.5/4 stars
Chicago Tribune	4/4 stars
The Rolling Stone Album Guide	3.5/5 stars

Black Snake Dîamond Röle is the debut solo album by former Soft Boys frontman Robyn Hitchcock.

Backed on various tracks by his former Soft Boy mates Kimberley Rew, Matthew Seligman and Morris Windsor, Hitchcock confessed satisfaction at being able to record an album with only his own artistic goals to cater to, whereas previously he had been compelled to write for the band. Vince Ely of the Psychedelic Furs, Knox and Pat Collier of the Vibrators, Gary Barnacle and Thomas Dolby also make guest backing appearances. The sessions were recorded from June 1980 to January 1981 at the Barge, Alaska Studios in Waterloo, London, and Music Works with Pat Collier producing ("with a little help from Matthew Seligman").

The ensuing set falls somewhere between the harder edged style of The Soft Boys and Hitchcock's more reflective and melodic work with The Egyptians a few years later. Released in May 1981, the album included ten original Hitchcock compositions. Key tracks include concert favourites "Acid Bird" and the rocker "Brenda's Iron Sledge", plus some of Hitchcock's patent comedy in "Do Policemen Sing?" and "The Man Who Invented Himself".

The album's working title "Zinc Pear" is retained in the cover art, although the title eventually settled on refers instead to the early Soft Boys recording "Black Snake Diamond Rock". (Another working title had it listed as "The Perfumed Corpse".) The cover art and calligraphy are Hitchcock's work (credited as "R.R.H."), and the inner sleeve of the LP featured an original, cosmic Hitchcock pen-and-ink comic titled The Enchanted Sewer.

The album has subsequently re-emerged on CD three times, with a mixture of bonus titles, pulled from B sides and outtakes. The 2nd and 3rd CD issues include a different mix of "The Man Who Invented Himself" sans horns, the original master having been lost in the intervening fourteen years.

In 2017, Hitchcock sporadically performed the album in-full live alongside Yo La Tengo.

== Track listing ==
All songs written by Robyn Hitchcock.

=== Side one ===
1. "The Man Who Invented Himself"
2. "Brenda's Iron Sledge"
3. "Do Policemen Sing?"
4. "The Lizard"
5. "Meat"

=== Side two ===
1. "Acid Bird"
2. "I Watch the Cars"
3. "Out of the Picture"
4. "City of Shame"
5. "Love"

=== 1st CD issue bonus tracks (Aftermath Records 1987) ===
1. "Dancing on God's Thumb" - originally B-side to "The Man Who Invented Himself" single, 1981

=== 2nd CD issue (Rhino Records 1995) ===
1. "The Man Who Invented Himself" (Zinc Pear mix)

=== 2nd CD issue bonus tracks (Rhino Records 1995) ===
1. "Dancing on God's Thumb" - originally B-side to "The Man Who Invented Himself" single, 1981
2. "Happy the Golden Prince"
3. "I Watch the Cars 2" (previously unissued version)
4. "It Was the Night" (previously unissued version)
5. "Grooving on a Inner Plane" (Single version)

=== 3rd CD issue bonus tracks (Yep Roc Records 2007) ===
1. "All I Wanna Do Is Fall in Love" *
2. "A Skull, a Suitcase, and a Long Red Bottle of Wine" *
3. "It Was the Night" (previously unissued version)
4. "I Watch the Cars 2" (previously unissued version)
5. "Give Me a Spanner Ralph" *
6. "It's a Mystic Trip" *
7. "Grooving on a Inner Plane" (Single version)
8. "Happy the Golden Prince"

* denotes previous availability on Invisible Hitchcock

"Dancing on Gods Thumb" is dropped.
The other bonus tracks previously available on the Rhino version have their stereo fields reversed compared to that release.
Album tracks are same as Rhino version, i.e. still Zinc Pear mix of "The Man Who Invented himself".

== Personnel ==
- Robyn Hitchcock - piano, bass, lead guitar, artwork
- Morris Windsor - drums, backing vocals
- Gary Barnacle - saxophone on "The Man Who Invented Himself"
- Matthew Seligman - bass, overbass on "Love"
- Vince Ely - drums on "Brenda's Iron Sledge", "Do Policemen Sing?", "The Lizard" and "I Watch the Cars"
- Kimberley Rew - guitar on "Do Policemen Sing?", "The Lizard", "I Watch the Cars" and "City of Shame"
- Knox - guitar on "Meat" and "Out of the Picture"
- Robb Appleton - backing vocals on "Love"
- Howie Gilbert - backing vocals on "Love"
- Tom Dolby - keyboards/ocean on "Love"

Technical

- Andy Llewellyn, Jo Julian, Pat Collier - engineer
