= I Often Dream of Trains =

1984 album by Robyn Hitchcock

Studio album by Robyn Hitchcock
- Released: September 1984
- Recorded: 1984
- Studios: Smithsound Recording, Ledbury, Herefordshire
- Genres: Psychedelic folk, psychedelic rock
- Label: Midnight Music
- Producer: Robyn Hitchcock

Robyn Hitchcock chronology
Groovy Decay (1982)	I Often Dream of Trains (1984)	Fegmania! (1985)

Professional ratings
Review scores
Source	Rating
AllMusic	4.5/5 stars
Chicago Sun-Times	4/4 stars
Chicago Tribune	4/4 stars
The Rolling Stone Album Guide	2.5/5 stars

I Often Dream of Trains is the third album by Robyn Hitchcock, released in 1984. It is Hitchcock's first acoustic-based album.

After the break-up of The Soft Boys, Hitchcock recorded two solo albums — 1981's Black Snake Diamond Role and 1982's poorly received Groovy Decay — before hitting an artistic slump mitigated only by some collaborations with Captain Sensible. Hitchcock worked odd jobs, including a stint as a gardener and a journalist. Hitchcock felt compelled to return to music after listening to Wading Through a Ventilator, a 1984 EP that compiles The Soft Boys' early singles. He wanted to make a fully solo album that, he would later comment, "only I could be blamed for".

The vinyl album was fourteen tracks, bookended by the piano-based instrumental "Nocturne". In 1986, the album was reissued on CD with tracks taken from Hitchcock's recent B-sides. A later CD edition saw yet more extras thrown in, all of which were demos of tracks originally included, bringing the listing to a total of twenty-four tracks. A third CD edition dropped the previous demo bonus tracks, along with "Mellow Together", but added more unreleased songs.

In 2009 a live recording titled I Often Dream of Trains in New York was released by Yep Roc, recorded at a 2008 concert at which Hitchcock performed almost every song from I Often Dream of Trains, as well as other songs from the era and one contemporary song.

== Recording ==
The album was recorded in the space of a few days under the working title Crystal Branches (taken from a line in the song "Winter Love", not originally included in the track listing). Hitchcock contributes vocals, acoustic and electric guitar and piano.

Hitchcock sad, "I hadn't done any recording for two or three years, so it wasn't a chore. I didn't have a group. I didn't have any dates to perform, and I had no career, I had nothing at all at that point, apart from my life. And the songs were really written just for their own sake, so the stuff was very unadulterated. I had no deadline, no input from anybody else. I had no goal. I had nothing. It just existed entirely for its own sake."

== Reception ==
Profiling the album in 2007 for The A.V. Club's "Permanent Records" feature, "an ongoing closer look at the records that matter most", Christopher Bahn wrote:

The spare, quiet, even solemn quality of Trains, which sounds like it was recorded in a church graveyard at midnight in November, proved to be the perfect framework for Hitchcock's crystalline songs. His offbeat lyrical sensibility was in particularly fine form here, laced with Freudian symbolism as well as melancholy–but sardonically funny–psychedelia.

American music critic Jim DeRogatis called the album "the best of [Hitchcock's] solo albums", while the All Music Guide to Rock said it is "one of Hitchcock's most introspective and charming records" and a "kaleidoscopic journey through a colorfully twisted world". Canadian music magazine Exclaim! called it "arguably Robyn Hitchcock's finest album".

== Track listing ==
All songs written by Robyn Hitchcock.

Side one
No.	Title	Length
1.	"Nocturne (Prelude)"	1:36
2.	"Sometimes I Wish I Was a Pretty Girl"	1:59
3.	"Cathedral"	3:40
4.	"Uncorrected Personality Traits"	1:43
5.	"Sounds Great When You're Dead"	3:20
6.	"Flavour of Night"	2:55
7.	"Ye Sleeping Knights of Jesus"	3:59

Side two
No.	Title	Length
1.	"This Could Be the Day"	2:44
2.	"Trams of Old London"	3:27
3.	"Furry Green Atom Bowl"	3:14
4.	"Heart Full of Leaves"	2:27
5.	"Autumn Is Your Last Chance"	3:29
6.	"I Often Dream of Trains"	2:23
7.	"Nocturne (Demise)"	1:52

=== Bonus tracks ===
1986 CD (Midnight Records)
No.	Title	Length
1.	"Mellow Together"
2.	"Winter Love"
3.	"The Bones in the Ground"
4.	"My Favourite Buildings"
5.	"I Used To Say I Love You"

1995 CD (Rhino Records)
No.	Title	Length
1.	"Mellow Together"
2.	"Winter Love"
3.	"The Bones in the Ground"
4.	"My Favourite Buildings"
5.	"I Used To Say I Love You"
6.	"Ye Sleeping Knights of Jesus" (Demo)
7.	"Sometimes I Wish I Was a Pretty Girl" (Demo)
8.	"Cathedral" (Demo)
9.	"Mellow Together" (Demo)
10.	"The Bones in the Ground" (Demo)

2007 CD (Yep Roc Records)
No.	Title	Length
1.	"Winter Love"
2.	"The Bones in the Ground"
3.	"My Favourite Buildings"
4.	"I Used To Say I Love You"
5.	"Chant/Aether"
6.	"Heart Full of Leaves" (Alternative Version)
7.	"I Often Dream of Trains" (Demo)
8.	"Not Even A Nurse"
9.	"Slow Chant / That's Fantastic Mother Church"
10.	"Traveller's Fare"

== Personnel ==
- Robyn Hitchcock - vocals, acoustic and electric guitar, piano

with:

- James Fletcher - saxophone on "Flavour of Night"
- Chris Cox - bass on "Ye Sleeping Knights of Jesus"

Technical

- Iain O'Higgins, Pascal Gabriel, Pat Collier - engineer
