= Jewels for Sophia =

1999 album by Robyn Hitchcock

Studio album by Robyn Hitchcock
- Released: 20 July 1999
- Genre: Folk rock, folk pop
- Label: Warner Bros.
- Producer: Robyn Hitchcock, Jon Brion, Pete Gerrald, Charlie Francis, Pat Collier

Robyn Hitchcock chronology
Moss Elixir (1996)	Jewels for Sophia (1999)	Luxor (2003)

Professional ratings
Review scores
Source	Rating
AllMusic	4/5 stars
Pitchfork Media	8.9/10

Jewels for Sophia is the twelfth studio album by Robyn Hitchcock, released on Warner Records on 20 July 1999.

Since Respect (1993), the hitherto prolific Hitchcock had released just one studio album (Moss Elixir in 1996), the rest of his recent output consisting largely of repackages and live recordings. Jewels For Sophia however contained a dozen tracks, only one of which ("No, I Don't Remember Guildford") had been recorded previously, and two extras not listed on the cover, and hidden away after a substantial pause following the album's "last" track.

Tracks include a paean to cheese in all its forms, with a sub-text of the global power struggle, and the quasi-nonsensical title number, whose lyric is rather pointed, in a similar vein to John Lennon's "I Am the Walrus". The two hidden extras are "Mr. Tongs" and "Don't Talk to Me About Gene Hackman".

== Personnel ==
Hitchcock recorded for the album in several sessions with different backing musicians. In Los Angeles, California he collaborated with guitarist Grant Lee Phillips and multi-instrumentalist Jon Brion; and in Seattle, Washington with guitarist Peter Buck and members of The Young Fresh Fellows. Kimberley Rew, Hitchcock's erstwhile collaborator in The Soft Boys, also appears on two songs, the first time in nearly 20 years the pair had recorded together.

== Track listing ==
All tracks composed by Robyn Hitchcock

1. "Mexican God"
2. "The Cheese Alarm"
3. "Viva! Sea-Tac"
4. "I Feel Beautiful"
5. "You've Got a Sweet Mouth on You, Baby"
6. "NASA Clapping"
7. "Sally Was a Legend"
8. "Antwoman"
9. "Elizabeth Jade"
10. "No, I Don't Remember Guildford"
11. "Dark Princess"
12. "Jewels for Sophia"
13. (Unlisted) "Mr. Tongs"
14. (Unlisted) "Don't Talk to Me About Gene Hackman"

== Personnel ==
ALL TRACKS

- Robyn Hitchcock - lead vocals, acoustic guitar (#1,2,3,4,5,9,10,11,12), electric guitar (#2,3,4,6,7,8,10,11), bass guitar (#2,12), backing vocals (#2,10), harmonica (#5,6,10), piano (#10,12), handclaps (#12)
- Tim Keegan - backing vocals (#2,3,8,10,11,12), acoustic guitar (#3,10,12), pop (#4), piano (#8), electric guitar (#9), shaker (#11)

TRACKS 1,2,4,5,8,11 – PRODUCED BY JON BRION IN LOS ANGELES

- Jon Brion - bass guitar (#1,11), drums (#1,2,8,11), keyboards (#2,8,11), marimba (#4), low sonic wobble (#4), marxophone (#4), vocals (#5), percussion (#5), organ (#11)
- Aloke Dutta - tabla (#2)
- Grant Lee Phillips - backing vocals (#4,8), bass guitar (#8)

TRACKS 3,9,12 – PRODUCED BY PETE GERRALD & ROBYN HITCHCOCK IN SEATTLE

- Scott McCaughey - bass guitar (#3,9,12), backing vocals (#3), handclaps (#12)
- Tad Hutchinson - drums (#3,9), handclaps (#12), percussion (#12)
- Peter Buck - electric guitar (#3,9,12)
- Kurt Bloch - organ (#3,9), handclaps (#12), percussion (#12)

TRACKS 6,7 – PRODUCED BY CHARLIE FRANCIS & ROBYN HITCHCOCK IN LONDON

- John Fell - bass guitar (#6,7)
- Rob Alum - drums (#6,7)
- Kimberley Rew - electric guitar (#6,7), backing vocals (#7)

TRACK 10 – PRODUCED BY PAT COLLIER & ROBYN HITCHCOCK IN LONDON

- Jake Kyle - bass guitar (#10)
- Patrick Hannan - drums (#10)
- James Fletcher - saxophone (#10)
