= Moss Elixir =

1996 album by Robyn Hitchcock

Studio album by Robyn Hitchcock
- Released: 1996
- Genre: Folk rock, folk pop, alternative rock
- Label: Warner Bros.
- Producer: Robyn Hitchcock

Robyn Hitchcock chronology
| Respect (1993) | Moss Elixir (1996) | Jewels for Sophia (1999) |

Professional ratings
Review scores
| Source | Rating |
|---|---|
| AllMusic | 3.5/5 stars |
| The Encyclopedia of Popular Music | 3/5 stars |
| Rolling Stone | 3.5/5 stars |

Moss Elixir is an album by English singer-songwriter Robyn Hitchcock, released in 1996. It contains twelve original compositions, predominantly acoustic.

Moss Elixir came packaged in green and gold, continuing the theme of his earlier solo acoustic albums, I Often Dream of Trains and Eye. The CD insert includes a short story: a vaguely autobiographical, surrealist account of Hitchcock in the afterlife, which weaves several images and titles from the album's contents into its storyline, including the elixir of the album's title.

"De Chirico Street" alludes to metaphysical painter Giorgio de Chirico. The album's first single was "Alright, Yeah".

== Production ==
Following the loss of his father, Hitchcock had recorded little in the preceding five years. When he re-emerged, he had dispensed with old group the Egyptians and begun working with new musicians, including Deni Bonet, a violinist with whom Hitchcock would collaborate several times in the years following.

"Man with a Woman's Shadow" was coproduced by Calvin Johnson.

== Critical reception ==
The Chicago Reader wrote that Hitchcock's "ringing guitar and gently Lennon-influenced singing are right up front, and other instruments appear only when the songs really ask for them ... Hitchcock hasn't sounded so engaged since 1990's Eye."

== Track listing ==
All tracks composed by Robyn Hitchcock

1. "Sinister but She Was Happy"
2. "The Devil's Radio"
3. "Heliotrope"
4. "Alright, Yeah"
5. "Filthy Bird"
6. "The Speed of Things"
7. "Beautiful Queen"
8. "Man with a Woman's Shadow"
9. "I Am Not Me"
10. "De Chirico Street"
11. "You and Oblivion"
12. "This Is How It Feels"
