= Gotta Let This Hen Out! =

1985 live album by Robyn Hitchcock & The Egyptians

Live album by Robyn Hitchcock and the Egyptians
- Released: October 1985
- Recorded: 27 April 1985, The Marquee, London "Repaired" at Alaska Studios; 15 June 1989, The Ritz, New York City
- Genre: Rock
- Length: 49:46
- Label: Midnight Music; Relativity Records; Rhino/WEA
- Producer: Pat Collier, Roger Jackson, Andy Metcalfe

Robyn Hitchcock and the Egyptians chronology
Fegmania! (1985)	Gotta Let This Hen Out! (1985)	Element of Light (1986)

Professional ratings
Review scores
Source	Rating
AllMusic	4.5/5 stars
Chicago Tribune	3.5/4 stars
The Rolling Stone Album Guide	4.5/5 stars

Gotta Let This Hen Out! is a live recording of Robyn Hitchcock and the Egyptians recorded in April 1985, shortly after the group had come together for Fegmania!.

The set was recorded at the Marquee and the tapes cleaned up for release at Alaska Studios with minor drop-in overdubs. The gig was also videotaped and appeared on VHS with a few additional numbers, interspersed with several studio recordings available through their promo videos.

The material selected for this album includes titles ranging through Hitchcock's back catalogue, from Soft Boys songs ("Kingdom Of Love", "The Face Of Death") through his first solo album ("Acid Bird", "Brenda's Iron Sledge") and up to the recently released Fegmania! ("Heaven", "My Wife and My Dead Wife"). The live recording captures the new band just it was defining its sound and fairly documents the highlights of Hitchcock's live set and musical focus in the mid-1980s.

The cover features a painting by Hitchcock depicting airborne fish, jellyfish and an array of ducks and chickens. As with a number of his albums, Hitchcock handwrote the liner notes. The album title is taken from the lyric of the song "Listening to the Higsons", the penultimate track on the album. Hitchcock has stated that this lyric comes from mishearing the chorus to the Higsons' "Gotta Let This Heat Out."

The Midnight CD issue adds "Egyptian Cream", "The Fly", and a staple of his live sets, the Soft Boys' "Only the Stones Remain", as does the 1995 Rhino reissue. The Yep Roc issue adds a further 5 tracks from a June 1989 gig at The Ritz, New York.

== Track listing ==
All songs written by Robyn Hitchcock.

=== Side one ===
1. "Sometimes I Wish I Was a Pretty Girl" (2:03)
2. "Kingdom of Love" (4:04)
3. "Acid Bird" (4:25)
4. "The Cars She Used to Drive" (2:44)
5. "My Wife and My Dead Wife" (3:54)
6. "Brenda's Iron Sledge" (2:57)

=== Side two ===
1. "Leppo and the Jooves" (4:52)
2. "America" (4:08)
3. "Heaven" (3:40)
4. "Listening to the Higsons" (2:36)
5. "The Face of Death" (3:13)

=== 1st and 2nd CD issue bonus tracks (Midnight Records 1986/Rhino Records 1995) ===
1. "The Fly"
2. "Only the Stones Remain"
3. "Egyptian Cream"

=== 3rd CD issue bonus tracks (Yep Roc Records 2008) ===
1. "The Fly"
2. "Only the Stones Remain"
3. "Egyptian Cream"
4. "If You Were A Priest"
5. "Freeze"
6. "I'm Only You"
7. "Unsettled"
8. "Egyptian Cream 2"

Sleeve erroneously omits last track "Egyptian Cream 2", and as such, lists the 'new' bonus tracks as 14-18 not 15-19.

== Personnel ==
- Robyn Hitchcock - vocals, guitar
- Roger Jackson - keyboards
- Andy Metcalfe - bass, vocals
- Morris Windsor - drums, ice cream
