= Greatest Hits (Baby Animals album) =

Greatest hits album by Baby Animals
- Released: 15 February 2019
- Recorded: 1990–2018
- Label: Bloodlines Records

Baby Animals chronology
| The Essential Five (2018) | Greatest Hits (2019) |

Singles from Greatest Hits
- 1. "Tonight" Released: 2 February 2018; 2. "How Do I Make You" Released: 15 February 2019

Greatest Hits is the first greatest hits album by Australian hard rock band Baby Animals. The album includes tracks from the band's four studio albums to date, and three new singles. The album was released digitally on 15 February 2019 to celebrate the band's 30th anniversary.

Lead singer Suze DeMarchi said "The whole 30-year thing to me is a little hard to wrap my head around because I don't feel any different; obviously we're older but our reason for doing it all is just for fun and we've always said that."

The album was supported with an Australian tour in May 2019, with special guest Killing Heidi. DeMarchi said "We are so pumped for this tour, and to share the stage with Killing Heidi – can't wait to get out there and play live again!"

== Background and release ==
Baby Animals were formed in Sydney in 1989 and released their self-titled debut studio album in September 1991, which peaked at number 1 on the ARIA Charts, was certified 8× platinum and the band won three ARIA Music Awards at the Awards of 1992, including the Album of the Year. The band's second studio album, Shaved and Dangerous was released in 1993, peaked at number 2 and was certified gold, before disbanding in 1996. In 2007, the band reformed and released an acoustic album, titled Il Grande Silenzio, before an album of new music in 2013, titled This Is not the End, which peaked at number 19. In 2016, the band re-released their debut album, under the title BA25. Baby Animals have continued to tour, having just come off the Red Hot Summer Tour performing alongside the likes of Suzi Quatro, The Screaming Jets and The Angels.

The album was announced alongside the album's second single "How Do I Make You", a cover of a Linda Ronstadt song. On social media, DeMarchi wrote "Our new single... from our Greatest Hits album [was] originally recorded by the beautiful Linda Ronstadt, one of my childhood inspirational women"

== Track listing ==
| No. | Title | Writer(s) | Album | Length |
|---|---|---|---|---|
| 1. | "Early Warning" | Suze DeMarchi; Dave Leslie; Eddie Parise | Baby Animals | 3:56 |
| 2. | "Rush You" | DeMarchi; Leslie; Parise | Baby Animals | 4:08 |
| 3. | "Painless" | DeMarchi; Parise | Baby Animals | 3:41 |
| 4. | "One Word" | DeMarchi; Steve Elson | Baby Animals | 3:56 |
| 5. | "Working for the Enemy" | DeMarchi; Parise | Baby Animals | 4:30 |
| 6. | "Break My Heart" | DeMarchi; Parise | Baby Animals | 4:02 |
| 7. | "Ain't Gonna Get" | DeMarchi; Elson | Baby Animals | 2:58 |
| 8. | "Impossible to Fly" | DeMarchi; Elson | non-album single | 3:22 |
| 9. | "Don't Tell Me What to Do" | DeMarchi; Leslie; Parise | Shaved and Dangerous | 4:11 |
| 10. | "At the End of the Day" | DeMarchi; Parise | Shaved and Dangerous | 2:51 |
| 11. | "Lights Out at Eleven" | DeMarchi; Leslie; Parise | Shaved and Dangerous | 5:28 |
| 12. | "Backbone" | DeMarchi; Leslie; Parise | Shaved and Dangerous | 5:15 |
| 13. | "Email" | DeMarchi; Leslie | This Is not the End | 3:45 |
| 14. | "Stitch" | DeMarchi | This Is not the End | 3:45 |
| 15. | "Invisible Dreamer" | DeMarchi; Leslie | This Is not the End | 3:44 |
| 16. | "Got It Bad" | DeMarchi; Leslie | This Is not the End | 3:38 |
| 17. | "Tonight" | | Greatest Hits | 3:36 |
| 18. | "How Do I Make You" | Billy Steinberg | Greatest Hits | 2:15 |
| 19. | "The Long Goodbye" | | Greatest Hits | 3:57 |
| 20. | "Satellite" | DeMarchi; Leslie | Il Grande Silenzio | 3:10 |

== Release history ==
| Region | Date | Format | Label |
|---|---|---|---|
| Australia | 15 February 2019 | digital download; streaming | Bloodlines |
