= BA25 (album) =

Studio album (reissue) by Baby Animals
- Released: 20 May 2016
- Recorded: 1992
- Studio: Nashville and Boston, United States
- Genre: Rock
- Label: Liberation
- Producer: Mike Chapman

Baby Animals chronology
This Is Not the End (2013)	BA25 (2016)	Baby Animals Live (2017)

BA25 is the 25th-anniversary edition reissue of Australian rock band Baby Animals' self-titled debut studio album. The original album sold 600,000 copies and peaked at number 1 on the Australian ARIA Charts, where it remained for six weeks and was the second biggest selling album in Australia in 1991.

Lead singer Suze DeMarchi said: "I look back on that whole time with great affection, it was a really thrilling time for all of us. I always said that Baby Animals was the only band for me, and it really has been the only band for me."

The album contains 10 tracks from the original release as well live songs, B-sides and pre-studio demos. The live recordings are taken from a concert in Boston when the band was on tour with Van Halen in 1992.

The band performed two live shows in Melbourne and Sydney in May 2016 to promote the album.

The album debuted at number 73 in Australia.

== Track listing ==
=== Original album ===
1. "Rush You" (Suze DeMarchi, Dave Leslie, Eddie Parise) – 4:11
2. "Early Warning" (DeMarchi, Leslie, Parise) – 3:57
3. "Painless" (DeMarchi, Parise) – 3:42
4. "Make It End" (DeMarchi, Steve Elson) – 4:09
5. "Working for the Enemy" (DeMarchi, Leslie) – 4:32
6. "One Word" (DeMarchi, Elson) – 3:58
7. "Break My Heart" (DeMarchi, Parise) – 4:03
8. "Waste of Time" (DeMarchi, Leslie, Parise, Celenza) – 3:38
9. "One Too Many" (DeMarchi, Elson) – 5:08
10. "Ain't Gonna Get" (DeMarchi, Elson) – 2:58

=== Live from Boston, 5 March 1992 ===
Van Halen F.U.C.K Tour Side-show.

1. "Rush You" (Live from Boston)
2. "Somethings Are Better" (Live from Boston)
3. "Baby Animals" (Live from Boston)
4. "Working for the Enemy" (Live from Boston)
5. "Big Boys (Big Time Friends)" (Live from Boston)
6. "Smile on My Face" (Live from Boston)
7. "Painless" (Live from Boston)
8. "One Word" (Live from Boston)
9. "Waste of Time" (Live from Boston)
10. "One Too Many" (Live from Boston)
11. "Ain't Gonna Get" (Live from Boston)
12. "Impossible to Fly" (Live from Boston)
13. "Early Warning" (Live from Boston)
14. "Fire" (Live from Boston)

=== Bonus tracks ===
1. "Baby Animals" ('Early Warning' b-side)
2. "Dedicate" ('Painless' b-side)
3. "One Word" (Demo)
4. "Make It End" (Demo)

== Charts ==
Chart (2016)	Peak position
Australian Albums (ARIA)	73

== Release history ==
Country	Date	Format	Label	Catalogue
Australia	20 May 2016	CD, digital download	Liberation	LMCD0288
