= Il Grande Silenzio =

Studio album by Baby Animals
- Released: 21 January 2008
- Recorded: March 2007
- Studio: Stellasound Studio, Los Angeles
- Genre: Acoustic
- Length: 36:56
- Label: Liberation Records
- Producer: Justin Stanley

Baby Animals chronology
Shaved and Dangerous (1993)	Il Grande Silenzio (2008)	This Is Not the End (2013)

Il Grande Silenzio is the third studio album by Australian band the Baby Animals, released in January 2008. The album peaked at number 78 in Australia. The band appeared live on the Australian breakfast TV program Sunrise on 22 January 2008.

== Background ==
From 1989 to 1996, Baby Animals toured and promoted music from their two ARIA Award-winning studio albums. In 1996, the band broke up and lead singer Suze DeMarchi went solo and raised a family. In 2005, Liberation Records asked if Baby Animals would record an acoustic album, to which DeMarchi said repeatedly 'No'. However, in March 2007, DeMarchi found herself (with bandmates Frank Celenza, Dave Leslie and Eddie Parise) in producer Justin Stanley's backyard recording studio, making an acoustic record.

Commercially released in 2008, the finished album features acoustic renditions of six tracks from the band's 1991 self titled debut album, one track ("Don't Tell Me What To Do") from 1993's Shaved And Dangerous album, two tracks from DeMarchi's 1999 solo album Telelove ("Satellite" and "Submarine"), and two new tracks, "Stitch" and "U Still Need Me".

== Track listing ==
1. "One Word" - 3:20
2. "Early Warning" - 3:05
3. "Stitch" - 3:21
4. "Rush You" - 3:04
5. "Make It End" - 3:24
6. "Painless" - 4:14
7. "Submarine" - 4:54
8. "U Still Need Me" - 2:44
9. "Satellite" - 3:09
10. "Don't Tell Me What To Do" - 2:59
11. "Working for the Enemy" - 2:42

== Charts ==
Chart (2008)	Peak position
ARIA Albums Chart	78

== Credits ==
- Suze DeMarchi – lead vocals, guitar
- Dave Leslie – guitar
- Frank Celenza – drums, percussion
- Eddie Parise – bass guitar
- Cello – Cameron Stone
- Guitar [Dobro] – Doyle Bramhall
- Violin – Charlie Bisharat
- Tabla - Satnam Ramgotra
- Drums on "Painless" - Nuno Bettencourt
- Additional Instrumentation - Justin Stanley
