= ARIA Award for Song of the Year (Songwriter) =

Former Australian music award

- 1998 winner the Whitlams
- Country: Australia
- Presented by: Australian Recording Industry Association (ARIA)
- First award: 1987
- Final award: 1998
- Currently held by: The Whitlams, "No Aphrodisiac" (1998)

Highlights
- Most wins: Crowded House (2)
- Most nominations: Crowded House (5)
- Website: www.ariaawards.com.au

The ARIA Music Award for Song of the Year (Songwriter) was an award presented at the annual ARIA Music Awards, which recognises "the many achievements of Aussie artists across all music genres", since 1987. It was awarded by the Australian Recording Industry Association (ARIA), an organisation whose aim is "to advance the interests of the Australian record industry."

Song of the Year (Songwriter) was given as an industry voted award from 1987 until 1998, when it was discontinued. Crowded House were both the only artist to win the award twice and the only artist to receive more than two nominations in this category, with five. Members Neil and Tim Finn were also the only musicians nominated both as solo artists and members of a group. Savage Garden were the only artist to receive two nominations in the same year, as in 1997 they won for "To the Moon and Back" and were also nominated for "Truly Madly Deeply", though in 1994 Tim Finn was nominated both as a solo artist and a member of Crowded House.

The ARIA Award for Single of the Year was renamed to Song of the Year in 2012.

== Winners and nominees ==
In the following table, the winner is highlighted in a separate colour, and boldface; the nominees are those that are not highlighted or in boldface. All reliable sources used in this article make no mention of other nominees for the year 1987.

Winner marked in a separate colour

Year	Winner(s)	Song title
**1987** (1st)	**Crowded House**	**"Don't Dream It's Over"**
**1988** (2nd)
**1988** (2nd)	**Midnight Oil**	**"Beds Are Burning"**
**1988** (2nd)	Dave Dobbyn with Herbs	"Slice of Heaven"
**1988** (2nd)	Icehouse	"Crazy"
**1989** (3rd)
**1989** (3rd)	**Crowded House**	**"Better Be Home Soon"**
**1989** (3rd)	The Go-Betweens	"Streets of Your Town"
**1989** (3rd)	INXS	"Never Tear Us Apart"
**1989** (3rd)	John Farnham	"Age of Reason"
**1989** (3rd)	The Church	"Under the Milky Way"
**1990** (4th)
**1990** (4th)	**Ian Moss**	**"Tucker's Daughter"**
**1990** (4th)	The Black Sorrows	"Chained to the Wheel"
**1990** (4th)	Hunters and Collectors	"When the River Runs Dry"
**1990** (4th)	Peter Blakeley	"Crying in the Chapel"
**1990** (4th)	Paul Kelly & The Messengers	"Careless"
**1991** (5th)
**1991** (5th)	**John Farnham**	**"Burn for You"**
**1991** (5th)	The Black Sorrows	"Harley + Rose"
**1991** (5th)	Wendy Matthews	"Token Angels"
**1991** (5th)	Midnight Oil	"Blue Sky Mine"
**1991** (5th)	Hunters and Collectors	"Turn a Blind Eye"
**1992** (6th)
**1992** (6th)	**Yothu Yindi**	**"Treaty (Filthy Lucre Remix)"**
**1992** (6th)	Baby Animals	"Early Warning"
**1992** (6th)	Crowded House	"Fall At Your Feet"
**1992** (6th)	Deborah Conway	"It's Only the Beginning"
**1992** (6th)	Southern Sons	"Hold Me in Your Arms"
**1993** (7th)
**1993** (7th)	**Weddings Parties Anything**	**"Fathers Day"**
**1993** (7th)	Baby Animals	"One Word"
**1993** (7th)	Crowded House	"Weather With You"
**1993** (7th)	Diesel	"Tip of My Tongue"
**1993** (7th)	Rockmelons featuring Deni Hines	"That Word (L.O.V.E.)"
**1994** (8th)
**1994** (8th)	**The Cruel Sea**	**"The Honeymoon Is Over"**
**1994** (8th)	Crowded House	"Distant Sun"
**1994** (8th)	The Cruel Sea	"Black Stick"
**1994** (8th)	Diesel	"Never Miss Your Water"
**1994** (8th)	Tim Finn	"Persuasion"
**1995** (9th)
**1995** (9th)	**Tina Arena**	**"Chains"**
**1995** (9th)	Christine Anu	"Island Home"
**1995** (9th)	Max Sharam	"Coma"
**1995** (9th)	Merril Bainbridge	"Mouth"
**1995** (9th)	Silverchair	"Tomorrow"
**1996** (10th)
**1996** (10th)	**Nick Cave & The Bad Seeds** and **Kylie Minogue**	**"Where the Wild Roses Grow"**
**1996** (10th)	Powderfinger	"Pick You Up"
**1996** (10th)	Tim Finn & Neil Finn	"Suffer Never"
**1996** (10th)	Tina Arena	"Wasn't It Good"
**1996** (10th)	Swoop	"Apple Eyes"
**1997** (11th)
**1997** (11th)	**Savage Garden**	**"To the Moon and Back"**
**1997** (11th)	**Savage Garden**	"Truly Madly Deeply"
**1997** (11th)	Nick Cave & the Bad Seeds	"Into My Arms"
**1997** (11th)	Paul Kelly	"How to Make Gravy"
**1997** (11th)	Powderfinger	"D.A.F."
**1998** (12th)
**1998** (12th)	**The Whitlams**	**"No Aphrodisiac"**
**1998** (12th)	Monique Brumby	"The Change in Me"
**1998** (12th)	The Fauves	"Surf City Limits"
**1998** (12th)	The Living End	"Prisoner of Society"
**1998** (12th)	The Mavis's	"Cry"

== Artists with multiple nominations ==
6 nominations

- Neil Finn (Note: Including five as a member of Crowded House.)

5 nominations

- Crowded House

4 nominations

- Tim Finn (Note: Including two as a member of Crowded House in 1992 and 1993.)

2 nominations

- Baby Animals
- Tina Arena
- The Black Sorrows
- The Cruel Sea
- Diesel
- John Farnham
- Hunters & Collectors
- Paul Kelly
- Midnight Oil
- Nick Cave & the Bad Seeds
- Powderfinger
- Savage Garden
