= Troy Newman (singer) =

- Born: Troy Adrian Newman; 1964; Perth, Western Australia, Australia
- Died: March 1997 (aged 32–33) Sydney, New South Wales, Australia
- Genre: Rock
- Years active: 1986–1997
- Labels: Warner, EastWest, Curb, Edel

Troy Adrian Newman (1964 – March 1997) was an Australian singer-songwriter and musician who was a member of Perth pop, rock band Boys from 1987 to 1988 and also had a solo career, releasing two albums, Gypsy Moon (1991) and It's Like This (1995) before he died in March 1997.

== Biography ==
Newman was born in Perth, Western Australia. He began writing songs while attending Hollywood Senior High School and, in his earlier years, fronted The Exdreamists. At age seventeen he joined popular local Perth band Boys as a vocalist, when they reformed in 1987 with Camillo Del Roio and Lino Del Roio on guitar, Eddie Parise on bass guitar, drummer Frank Celenza and Tony Celiberti as keyboardist. A year later the band changed their name to Boyschool but split soon after, with Parise and Celenza moving to form Bamboo Curtain, before joining Baby Animals.

Following the break-up of Boys, Newman moved from Perth to Sydney, where he signed a deal with Warner Music. In September 1989 Newman appeared in the controversial stage musical, Bad Boy Johnny and the Prophets of Doom alongside Daniel Abineri, Wendy Stapleton, Gary Olsen, Steve Bastoni and Nadine Garner – he took over the lead role from Russell Crowe. The musical spawned a cast album on WEA Records and a Top 40 single, "Enemy the Sun", (November 1989) performed by Newman.

The label flew Newman to Los Angeles where he recorded his debut solo album, Gypsy Moon, with session musicians, Craig Fall, Luis Conte, Bob Glaub, Jerry Goodman, Russ Kunkel, C. J. Vanston and Waddy Wachtel, and guest appearances from Rick Vito and Billy Burnette. The album was produced by Greg Ladanyi (Jackson Browne, Toto, Fleetwood Mac, Don Henley), except "Raining" by Richard Clapton and "Drive My Car" by Ladanyi and Kunkel. It was released 14 May 1991 in Australia by Warner and also in the United States through Atlantic imprint EastWest Records. The album spent five weeks in the Australian album charts, peaking at No. 42. The first single released, "Love Gets Rough", reached No. 22 on the Australian Singles charts and charted at No. 92 on the Billboard Top 100. Other singles from the album, "God Only Knows" (Australia No. 85) and "Whisper" (Australia No. 73), released later that year, fared less-well on the charts. His song, "Raining", was used on television series, Heartbreak High (Season 1, 1994, episode 10).

Warner Music offered Troy a second album deal, but stipulated he had to return to Australia to record the album with a different Producer (which he declined). A battle ensued and East/West & Warner Music dropped him from the label just as he was gaining momentum. Warner Music placed the cost of producing the Gypsy Moon album onto any future recording contracts and labels which, in turn, made it virtually impossible for Newman to get a second record deal.

After a lengthy legal battle and change of Management, Newman issued It's Like This on 18 July 1995 on the Curb Records/Edel Records labels. Newman had recorded the album in Los Angeles again, with Wachtel, Glaub, Kunkel, Conte and Vanston. It was produced by Ladanyi and Wachtel but failed to emulate the success of his debut album and didn't chart. Linda Ronstadt later covered Newman & Wachtel's track "I go to pieces" on her "We Ran" album. Newman's track "Don't Make Me Ask" also appeared in the film "Two If by Sea" (also known in the United Kingdom as Stolen Hearts), a 1996 American romantic comedy film directed by Bill Bennett, and starring Sandra Bullock and Denis Leary.

In August 1996, Ladanyi & Newman teamed up again - This time at 301 Studios, Sydney Australia to record a 10 track demo entitled "Velvet Hammer." Lineup: Troy Newman: Vocals/Guitar, (Former Baby Animals Bass Guitarist) Eddie Parise, (Former Baby Animals Drummer) Frank Celenza & Current Baby Animals Guitarist Dave Leslie. After recording Ladanyi returned to Los Angeles to remaster the demos personally. Being devastated after Newman's death, Ladanyi shelved the project.

Troy Newman died in Sydney in March 1997. As his body was found with a toxic combination of prescription drugs, there was speculation that he committed suicide however the autopsy was inconclusive. Newman had also contracted Hepatitis A which may have contributed to his death.

Troy Newman left a legacy of published and unpublished songs - many of which have never been heard.

Newman's last album finally surfaced in 2018 called Postcards from L.A containing 10 tracks.

== Discography ==
=== Studio albums ===
List of albums, with selected details and chart positions
Title	Album details	Peak chart positions
Title	Album details	AUS
Gypsy Moon	Released: July 1991; Label: Warner (9031-73778-2); Format: CD, cassette	42
It's Like This	Released: October 1995; Label: Mega Pop (MP7502D); Format: CD, cassette	163
Postcards from L.A	Released: August 2018; Format: Digital	—

=== Singles ===
List of singles, with selected chart positions
Title	Year	Peak chart positions	Album
Title	Year	AUS	Album
"Enemy the Sun"	1989	—	Non-album single
"Love Gets Rough"	1991	22	Gypsy Moon
"God Only Knows"	1991	85	Gypsy Moon
"Whisper"	1992	73	Gypsy Moon
"The Missing Years"	1995	173	It's Like This
"World Gone Crazy"	1995	165	It's Like This
"Don't Make Me Ask"	1996	—	It's Like This

== Awards and nominations ==
=== ARIA Music Awards ===
The ARIA Music Awards is an annual awards ceremony that recognises excellence, innovation, and achievement across all genres of Australian music. They commenced in 1987.

Year	Nominee / work	Award	Result	Ref.
1992	"Love Gets Rough"	Breakthrough Artist - Single	Nominated	
