= Home (Suze DeMarchi album) =

Studio album by Suze DeMarchi
- Released: 24 July 2015
- Genre: Rock
- Length: 35:52
- Label: Social Family Records
- Producer: Shane Nicholson

Suze DeMarchi chronology
Telelove (1999)	Home (2015)

Home is the second studio album by Suze DeMarchi, lead singer of Australian band the Baby Animals, released in July 2015. The album features 11 cover songs that all centre around the theme of home. Upon release DeMarchi said “I’ve always been drawn to stories about Home, and love many songs about Home that resonate with me now as much as they did during the years I was away. I find myself humming them daily. To celebrate my journey I’ve recorded an album of some of those songs, with some friends, and with those I admire.”

== Reception ==
Professional ratings
Review scores
Source	Rating
The Music Au	3.5/5 stars

Paul Barbieri from The Music AU said "Her voice perfectly suits alt.country and versions of Ryan Adams' Come Home and The Box Tops' The Letter are pretty awesome." Rob Stewart from Gove FM said "Never before has Suze’s range and dexterity been best displayed than on this new LP" praising "Safe European Home". 100% Rock said "Home is a bold stab from one of our more talented rockstars, and even if it plays too safe in its first half, DeMarchi should be applauded for trying to do something different and interesting."

== Track listing ==
1. "Our House" (featuring Russell Morris) - 4:03
2. "Come Home" - 4:13
3. "Home" (West Coast Version) - 3:59
4. "Hometown Glory" - 3:48
5. "Get Home" - 3:17
6. "Home" (East Coast Version) - 3:56
7. "The Letter" (featuring Tex Perkins) - 2:45
8. "The House is Rockin'" (featuring Diesel and Jimmy Barnes) - 2:26
9. "Safe European Home" (featuring Dallas Frasca) - 3:10
10. "Homeless" (featuring Mick Skelton) - 4:20

== Charts ==
Chart (2015)	Peak position
Australian Albums (ARIA)	26

== Release history ==
Country	Date	Format	Label	Catalogue
Australia	24 July 2015	CD, digital download, Vinyl	Social Family Records	SFR0033
