= Sugar Box =

Song by Then Jerico

Single by Then Jerico

from the album The Big Area
- Released: 1989
- Genre: Pop rock
- Length: 3:47
- Label: London Records
- Songwriter(s): Then Jerico
- Producer(s): Rick Nowels

Then Jerico singles chronology
"What Does It Take" (1989)	"Sugar Box" (1989)

"Sugar Box" is a song by British band Then Jerico, released as the third single from their 1989 album The Big Area. The song peaked at No. 22 on the UK Singles Chart in August 1989. It is the band's third biggest hit, after "Big Area" (No. 13) and their 1987 song "The Motive (Living Without You)" (No. 18).
