= At the End of the Day / Backbone =

1993 single by Baby Animals

"At the End of the Day" / "Backbone"
- CD single cover

Single by Baby Animals

from the album Shaved and Dangerous
- B-side: "Wodge" (live); "One Too Many" (live); "Ain't Gonna Get" (live)
- Released: 18 October 1993
- Length: 2:50 ("At the End of the Day"); 5:18 ("Backbone")
- Label: Imago
- Songwriter(s): Suze DeMarchi; Eddie Parise; Dave Leslie ("Backbone" only)
- Producer(s): Ed Stasium

Baby Animals singles chronology
| "Don't Tell Me What to Do" (1993) | "At the End of the Day" / "Backbone" (1993) | "Lights Out at Eleven" (1994) |

Alternative cover
- CD single cover

"At the End of the Day" and "Backbone" are two songs by Australian rock band Baby Animals, released as a double A-side single. It was released in October 1993 as the second single from their second studio album, Shaved and Dangerous (1993). The single peaked at number 60 on the Australian Singles Chart. "At the End of the Day" is entirely sung in French except for the chorus line, "At the end of the day the sun goes down".

== Track listing ==
CD single

1. "At the End of the Day" – 2:52
2. "Backbone" – 5:17
3. "Wodge" (live) – 3:13
4. "One Too Many" (live) – 5:28
5. "Ain't Gonna Get" (live) – 3:35
- All live tracks were recorded at the Newcastle Civic Theatre in June 1992.

== Charts ==
| Chart (1993) | Peak position |
|---|---|
| Australia (ARIA) | 60 |
