= Boys (Australian band) =

Australian hard rock band

- Origin: Perth, Western Australia, Australia
- Genre: Hard rock
- Years active: 1977–1983, 1987–1988
- Label: Parole
- Past members: see Members list
- Website: Official website

Boys were an Australian hard rock band originally from Perth, Western Australia.

== History ==
Boys originally formed by guitar playing siblings, Lino and Camillo Del Roio, whilst still at high school as the Rockhouse Corporation in 1977 and started out as a cover band playing mostly top 40 rock but then progressed into playing original songs. "When You’re Lonely" was the first single released in August 1980, with the single going to No. 1 on the local charts and reaching No. 52 on the national singles charts. In September 1980 the band appeared on Countdown. The Boys released two further singles, "Hurt Me Babe" in March 1981 and "Weoh Weoh Weoh" in September 1981, which reached No. 57 and No. 76 on the national charts. The band released their self-titled debut in November 1981. In September 1982 they released, "Don't Say No", which was followed by their second album, Inside the Cage, in December 1982,. The band's original singer for the first album, Brent Lucanus, was replaced by Wayne Green (Wayne Green and the Phantoms) on their second album. A further single, "Lonely Dreamers", was released in March 1983, The original band went through several line-up changes but brothers Camillo Del Roio and Lino Del Roio were constant members throughout. The band split in 1983 but reformed in 1987 with Camillo and Lino on guitar, Eddie Parise on bass, drummer Frank Celenza, Tony Celiberti as keyboardist, and singer, Troy Newman (Extremists). A year later the band changed their name to Boyschool but split soon after.

Following the band's break up guitar playing brothers Camillo and Lino formed D.D and the Rockmen with Celenza and the DeMarchi sisters Suze and Denise. The band's drummer and bassist, Celenza and Parise, went on to form Bamboo Curtain, before joining Baby Animals. Troy Newman moved to Sydney following the band's break up and found moderate success as a solo performer, scoring a Billboard hit with the single "Love Gets Rough" and the album Gypsy Moon in 1991, released through Atlantic imprint East West Records and by Warner Music in Australia. He released a second album, It's Like This, in 1996. Newman died in March 1997.

Lino Del Roio was appointed sales manager for Kosmic Sound (a music equipment supply company), in the late 1980s, which the two brothers subsequently bought (?), acquiring a number of other dealerships of leading brands of the time including exclusive dealerships for Steinberger and Ken Smith basses. They both played guitar for Western Australian hard rock outfit The Jets in the early 1990s. Tony Celeberti is an arranger for sheet music transcriptions who has worked on material by Guy Sebastian and Powderfinger, amongst others, for Australian publisher Music Sales. Brent Lucanus went on to play in a few bands around Perth, notably Change Alley with Gary Dunn.

== Members ==
- Frank Celenza — drums (1981–1983, 1987–88)
- Tony Celiberti — keyboards (1987–88)
- Tony Cimino — drums (1977–79)
- Camillo Del Roio — guitar, vocals (1977–1983, 1987–88)
- Lino Del Roio — guitar, vocals (1977–1983, 1987–88) (Deceased 2021)
- Wayne Green — vocals (1982–1983)
- Brent Lucanus — vocals (1977–1981) (Deceased 2021)
- Troy Newman — vocals (1987–88) (Deceased 1997)
- Eddie Parise — bass (1987–1988)
- Carmelo Sallazzo — drums (1979–1981)
- Roberto Salpietro — bass, vocals (1977–1983)

== Discography ==
=== Studio albums ===
Inside The Cage

List of albums, with selected chart positions
Title	Album details	Peak chart positions
Title	Album details	AUS
Boys	Released: November 1981; Label: Parole (L-37675)	49
Inside the Cage - Parole Records Australia 1982 Track Listing 1.Inside The Cage 2.When The Storm Breaks 3.My Heart Strays (Just A Little) 4.Don't Say No 5.Angels Of Mercy 6.Lonely Dreamers 7.Hiding In The Wings 8.Chances Are 9.I Wait To Find You Gone 10.Sorry	Released: December 1982; Label: Parole (L37912)	91

=== Singles ===
List of singles, with selected chart positions
Year	Title	Peak chart positions	Album
Year	Title	AUS	Album
1980	"When You're Lonely"/"It Doesn't Matter"	52	Boys
1981	"Hurt Me Babe"/"Coming Home"	57	Boys
1981	"Weoh, Weoh, Weoh"/"One Way"	76	Boys
1982	"Don't Say No"/"Why'd Ya Do That"	-	Inside the Cage
1983	"Lonely Dreamers"/"Cold Mind"	-	Inside the Cage
