= Bad Boy Johnny and the Prophets of Doom =

Australian rock stage musical

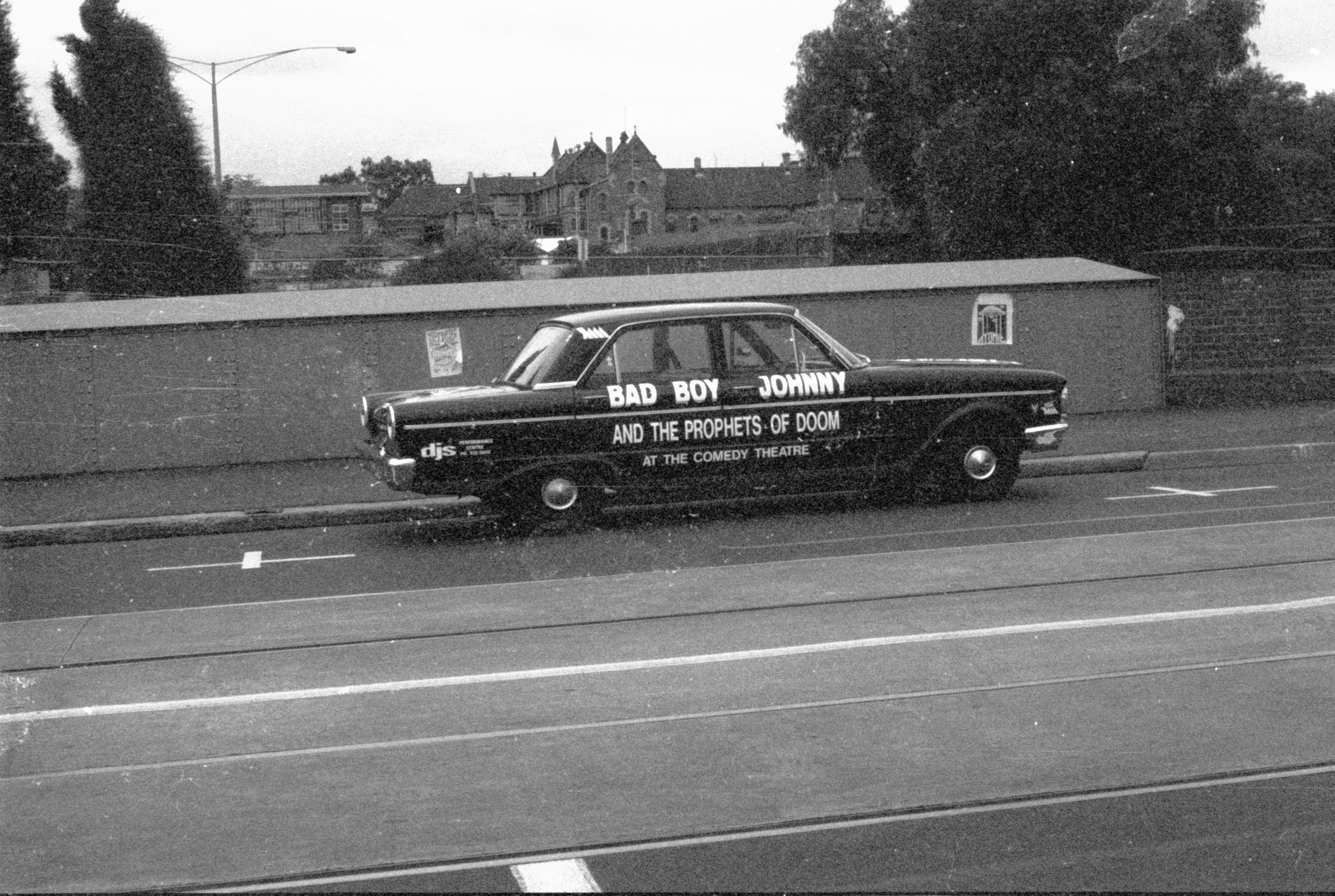
Bad Boy Johnny and the Prophets of Doom, 1989

Bad Boy Johnny and the Prophets of Doom is a rock stage musical first performed in Australia in 1989. It is a satire on religion and rock and roll.

== History ==
Written in 1986 by Daniel Abineri, it premiered in Melbourne in 1989 and featured Russell Crowe in the title role. Bad Boy Johnny enjoyed a six-month run in Melbourne and Sydney, won two International Pater Awards for best libretto and score, and spawned a cast album on WEA and a single "Enemy The Sun". The late Australian pop singer Troy Newman who took over the title role, is heard on the official cast album and single in place of Russell Crowe.

In April 1993 a showcase performance of the musical, directed by Daniel Abineri was performed at Jacksons Lane Community Theatre N6. Performing in the cast were 1980s pop band Then Jerico singer Mark Shaw in the title role, Daniel Abineri as Father McLean, with Elizabeth Carling from the TV drama series Boon, Sebastian Abineri as Pope Liberty III, Jody Saron as Desire and Cathy Murphy and Matt Selby in supporting roles.

On 26 January 1994, Bad Boy Johnny was re-mounted as a five-week limited showcase run at The Union Chapel in Islington London, again directed by Daniel Abineri and starring Craig Ferguson and Mark Shaw. It also featured Cornel John as Charlie Fortune, Anna Jacysaon as Mary, Eve Barker as Desire, Stephen Marcus as Pope Liberty, and Sandra Bee, Perry Benson, Louisa Casano, Mark Frost, Daniel Kyle and Louise Anne Wesley as the ensemble.

The 1994 London production made national news when it caused grave offence to the Roman Catholic Church and was closed down after just nine performances.

== Synopsis ==
Born on the wrong side of the tracks to a single mother and part-time prostitute called Mary, who died when he was little, Johnny steals his first guitar and forms a band, the Prophets of Doom. He is discovered and managed by his evil parish priest Father MacLean.

Booked onto an X Factor-type show called Have Your Say, Johnny is voted by the public as the person the world would like to see as the new Pontiff. However, the current incumbent, the obese Pope Liberty III, is not going to step down. Enter Johnny's number one fan Desire who, disguised as a nun, tries to seduce Liberty, leading him to die of a massive heart attack.

So Johnny is ordained as the people's Pope. However, he learns that MacLean raped his mother in the confessional box when she was just sixteen and that he is in fact Johnny's father. Things get even worse for Johnny when it then transpires that Maclean murdered Mary in order to get his hands on Johnny. Johnny swears revenge, so MacLean plans to have his client assassinated live on his TV show, The Vatican Tonite.

== Original song list ==
Taken from the 1990 CD recording.

- Let us Pray performed by Father MacLean
- Another Day performed by Mary
- Bad Boy Johnny performed by Johnny and the Prophets of Doom
- What U Want performed by Charlie Fortune and the Prophets of Doom
- Have Your Say performed by Johnny and the Prophets of Doom
- Maybe He's The One performed by the Cardinals
- Enemy The Sun performed by Johnny
- Kissing God performed by Desire
- Make me Divine performed by Mary and Father MacLean
- Bye Bye Johnny performed by Father Maclean
- I Believe performed by Johnny

== Song list (2010 UK tour) ==
- Intro performed by Johnny
- Let Us Pray performed by Father MacLean
- Another Day performed by Mary
- Sweet Virgin Mary performed by Johnny
- Kissing God (once) performed by Desire
- Bad Boy Johnny performed by Johnny and the Prophets of Doom
- What U Want performed by Johnny
- Have Your Say performed by Charlie Fortune
- Nobody Told Me performed by Pope Liberty
- Have Your Say (reprise) performed by Charlie Fortune and the Prophets of Doom

Interval

- Maybe He's The One performed by the Cardinals
- Johnny Is The King performed by Father MacLean
- Enemy The Sun performed by Johnny
- Kissing God (twice) performed by Desire
- Make Me Divine performed by Mary and Father MacLean
- Bye Bye Johnny performed by Father MacLean
- The Power & the Glory performed by Johnny
- Let Us Pay performed by Father MacLean
- I Believe performed by Johnny

== Productions ==
1989 Australian Cast

- Russell Crowe as Johnny
- Troy Newman as Johnny
- Daniel Abineri as Father MacLean
- Wendy Stapleton as Mary
- Gary Olsen as Pope Liberty III
- Steve Bastoni as Charlie Fortune
- Nadine Garner as Desire
- Brian Mannix, Wayne Pygram and Michael-John Hurney as The Cardinals

1993 London showcase cast

- Mark Shaw as Johnny
- Daniel Abineri as Father MacLean
- Elizabeth Carling as Mary
- Matt Selby as Charlie Fortune
- Sebastian Abineri as Pope Liberty
- Jody Saron as Desire

1994 London cast

- Mark Shaw as Johnny
- Craig Ferguson as Father MacLean
- Stephen Marcus as Pope Liberty
- Cornel John as Charlie Fortune
- Anna Jacysaon as Mary
- Eve Barker as Desire
- Sandra Bee, Perry Benson, Louisa Casano, Mark Frost, Daniel Kyle and Louise Anne Wesley as Cardinals/Ensemble

2010 UK touring cast Directed by Daniel Abineri

- Steve Steinman as Father Maclean
- Dawn Spence as Mary
- Henry Bird as Bad Boy Johnny
- Emily Clark as Desire
- Mike Taylor as Pope Liberty

Band

- Jordan Bracewell (guitar)
- Ben Grimsley (bass guitar)
- Nickky Miller (drums)
- Arthur Bird (keys)
- Laura Manship (sax)

Nuns backing vocals

- Jodie Cooper
- Chloe Bass
- Emily Clark
- Shereen Webb

== Cast recordings ==
In 1989 an LP cast recording of the 1989 Australian production was released on WEA 903171155–1.

In 1990 a CD cast recording of the 1989 Australian production was released on WEA 003171155–2.

Although it is noted that the title of the show differs and is called "Bad Boy Johnny and the Profits of Doom" and not "Prophets"

Extra songs "Sweet Virgin Mary" performed by Johnny in the show and "Nobody Told Me" performed by Pope Liberty did not feature on either the LP or CD.

=== Singles ===
List of singles, with selected chart positions
Title	Year	Peak chart positions
Title	Year	AUS
"Enemy the Sun"	1989	78
