= BA25 =

BA25 may refer to:

- Brodmann area 25 (BA25) area in the cerebral cortex of the brain
- Breda Ba.25 Italian two-seat biplane trainer designed and built by the Breda company
- BA25 (album), album by the Baby Animals
