= Telelove =

Studio album by Suze DeMarchi
- Released: March 1999
- Recorded: Longview Farm Recording Studios, Massachusetts; Rocking Horse Studios, Byron Bay, Australia
- Genre: Rock
- Length: 50:16
- Label: Mushroom
- Producer: Nuno Bettencourt

Suze DeMarchi chronology
| Telelove (1999) | Home (2015) |

Singles from Telelove
- 1. "Satellite" Released: November 1998; 2. "Karma" Released: March 1999; 3. "Open Windows" Released: July 1999

Professional ratings
Review scores
| Source | Rating |
|---|---|
| AllMusic | 3/5 stars |

Telelove is the debut solo album by Suze DeMarchi, lead singer of Australian band the Baby Animals, released in March 1999.

== Track listing ==
All tracks written by Suze DeMarchi, Dave Rankin and Eddie Parise unless otherwise noted.

1. "Karma" – 4:15
2. "Satellite" (Suze DeMarchi, Dave Rankin) – 4:22
3. "Open Windows" (DeMarchi, Nuno Bettencourt) – 4:36
4. "Mainline" (DeMarchi, Rankin) – 4:36
5. "Telelove" (DeMarchi, Bettencourt) – 4:39
6. "Psychic" – 5:24
7. "Down" – 3:09
8. "Colour of Love" (Bettencourt) – 5:23
9. "Fresh" – 4:48
10. "Trapped in Amber" – 3:46
11. "Submarine" (DeMarchi, Rankin, Bettencourt) – 5:22

== Charts ==
| Chart (1999) | Peak position |
|---|---|
| Australian Albums (ARIA) | 40 |

== Personnel ==
- Jose Barros – Hammond
- Nuno Bettencourt – acoustic guitar, guitar, mellotron, bass, vocals
- Frank Celenza – drums
- Dave Descenzo – drums
- John DeChristopher – strings, cymbals, stick
- Suze DeMarchi – guitar, vocals
- Tony Italia – drums
- Dave Leslie (Rankin) – guitar, vocals
- Mike Levesque – drums
- Bill O'Meara – strings, cymbals, stick
- Eddie Parise – bass, vocals
- Anthony J. Resta – programming, sampler, synthesizers
- Jake Shapiro – cello
- Oksana Solovieva – violin
