= The Big Area =

1989 studio album by Then Jerico

Studio album by Then Jerico
- Released: 20 February 1989
- Studio: The Manor; Maison Rouge; Olympic; Abbey Road; Westside; Outside; Townhouse; Air; RAK; (United Kingdom): Larabee; Sunset Sound; Westlake; Summa; Sound Castle; The Hit Factory; (United States)
- Genre: Rock
- Label: London; MCA
- Producer: Rhett Davies; Peter Henderson; Bruce Lampcov; Gary Langan; Rick Nowels; Mark Shaw

Then Jerico chronology
First (The Sound of Music) (1987)	The Big Area (1989)	Electric (1994)

Professional ratings
Review scores
Source	Rating
AllMusic	3/5 stars
Record Mirror	4/5 stars

The Big Area is the second album by English rock band Then Jerico, released in 1989. It includes three singles which reached the UK top 40: "Big Area" (No. 13; the band's biggest single to date), "What Does It Take" (featuring backing vocals by Belinda Carlisle; No. 33) and "Sugar Box" (No. 22). The album reached No. 4 in the UK Albums Chart.

== Track listing ==
All tracks written by Then Jerico (lyrics by Mark Shaw), except where noted.

No.	Title	Writer(s)	Length
1.	"Big Area"		4:49
2.	"What Does It Take"	Sandy Stuart; David Munday	3:50
3.	"You Ought to Know"		4:14
4.	"Song for the Brokenhearted"		4:31
5.	"Darkest Hour"	Shaw; Scott Taylor; Chris Youdell	4:33
6.	"Reeling"		5:39
7.	"Where You Lie"		4:56
8.	"Sugar Box"		3:46
9.	"Helpless"		4:09
10.	"Under Fire"		6:03

Note

- Track 10 not available on some formats of the album.

== Personnel ==
Adapted from album liner notes and AllMusic.

- John Brough – engineer
- Paul Buckmaster – string arrangements
- Belinda Carlisle – background vocals ("What Does It Take")
- Rhett Davies – producer
- Robert Downes – guitar
- Peter Henderson – engineer, producer
- Charles Judge – keyboards
- Bruce Lampcov – producer
- Gary Langan – producer
- Rick Nowels – producer
- Mark Shaw – producer, vocals
- Jason Stainthorpe – bass guitar
- Stuart – performer, primary artist
- Richard Sullivan – engineer
- Scott Taylor – rhythm guitar, performer, primary artist
- Then Jerico – primary artist
- Steve Wren – drums, percussion
- Chris Youdell – keyboards
