= Abineri =

Abineri is a surname. Notable people with the surname include:

- Daniel Abineri (born 1958), English songwriter, actor, narrator, director, and playwright
- John Abineri (1928–2000), English actor, father of Daniel
