= Rubbery Figures =

Australian puppet television series

- Genre: Adult puppeteering Political satire
- Country of origin: Australia
- Original language: English

Original release
- Network: ABC; Seven Network

Rubbery Figures was a satirical rubber puppet series and segment that screened in Australia in various forms from 1984 to 1990. The series ran on the ABC until 1988, when it was axed and subsequently revived as a segment on Seven Network's Fast Forward in April 1989. It featured puppets of major political and social characters.

== Production ==
The Rubbery Figures programs were made in the Melbourne film studio of Peter Nicholson, who also made the puppets themselves. Almost all the character voices for the puppets were performed by Melbourne voice actor Paul Jennings.

== Fast Forward's Rubbery Figures ==
Steve Vizard, the man behind Channel Seven's Fast Forward, had seen Rubbery Figures on the ABC and thought they would make a good point of difference from competing comedy sketch series. Due to budget constraints, Peter Nicholson semi-autonomously produced five minute segments that could be inserted into the program. During this period the figures expanded into less current political satire; for example the puppets of Prime Minister Bob Hawke and then Treasurer Paul Keating played the parts of Captain Kirk and Mr Spock on board the enterprise.

=== Characters ===
==== Australian politicians ====
The primary characters of Rubbery Figures were politicians native to Australia. The Rubbery Figures political characters included:

- Bob Hawke – portrayed as a self-centred, power-hungry opportunist
- Paul Keating – depicted as Hawke's down-to-earth but ambitious crony
- John Howard – an irritating, nerdy loser
- Andrew Peacock – vain and snobbish, often seen filing his nails
- Sir Joh Bjelke-Petersen – senile and rambling, with a tendency for malapropism ("you mark my verbs")
- John Elliott – a beer-swilling "yobbo", with his catchphrase of "pig's arse"

==== International politicians ====
Rubbery Figures also satirised prominent world politicians of the time, among them were:

- Margaret Thatcher – the then-Prime Minister of the United Kingdom; an eccentric profiteer, eager to sell to the Australian government
- Ronald Reagan – the then-President of the United States; portrayed as a lumberjack, making decisions based on his horoscope
- Mikhail Gorbachev – former General Secretary of the Communist Party of the Soviet Union; an easygoing liberal who was always giving himself time off
- David Lange – the Prime Minister of New Zealand from 1984 to 1989; portrayed as obese and haughty. Often the butt of jokes regarding New Zealand, such as the 1985 sinking of the Rainbow Warrior and French nuclear testing in the South Pacific.
- Muammar al-Gaddafi – former ruler of Libya, whose puppet was permanently impaled by a missile with the letters "USA" painted on one side

== Comparison with Spitting Image ==
The Sunday Mail noted in 1988 that "People think creator Peter Nicholson borrowed the idea for Rubbery Figures from the British puppet show Spitting Image. But Nicholson quickly points out he created his puppets before Spitting Image was shown in Australia". Nicholson told the Herald: "The programs are from slightly different traditions...Ours springs more from the newspaper political cartoon than the comedy tradition of Spitting Image. They are probably more gratuitous. Their people are a bit unkind. They set out to deliberately make people look terrible, whereas I think our people should look a bit redeemable".

== Music ==
In 1991, a music track called "The Recession Rap" with the rubbery figures was released. The music and lyrics were written by David Atkin, Peter Benson and Troy Hazard, the music was produced by David Atkin and Peter Benson and the characters were sung by Paul Jennings. It reached #60 on the ARIA Chart in August.

== On Exhibition ==
Although no longer being viewed on television, the Figures appeared at several exhibitions in the 1990s. In 1993, they were recast and refurbished to take part in "The Exhibition We Had To Have" at the National Gallery of Victoria as part of the Melbourne Comedy Festival. In 1994, "The Rubbery Years" in conjunction with the National Museum ran for six months at Old Parliament House in Canberra.

== Discography ==
=== Singles ===
Title	Year	Peak chart positions
Title	Year	AUS
"The Recession Rap"	1991	60

== Awards ==
=== ARIA Music Awards ===
The ARIA Music Awards are a set of annual ceremonies presented by Australian Recording Industry Association (ARIA), which recognise excellence, innovation, and achievement across all genres of the music of Australia. They commenced in 1987.

Year	Nominee / work	Award	Result	Ref.
1992	"The Recession Rap"	Best Comedy Release	Nominated	

== See also ==
- List of Australian television series
