= Big Area =

Single by Then Jerico

from the album The Big Area
- Released: 16 January 1989
- Length: 4:46
- Label: London
- Songwriters: Mark Shaw; Jasper Stainthorpe; Steve Wren; Scott Taylor; Rob Downes; Alex Mungo
- Producer: Gary Langan

Then Jerico singles chronology
"Muscle Deep" (1987)	"Big Area" (1989)	"What Does It Take" (1989)

"Big Area" is a song by English rock band Then Jerico, released on 16 January 1989 as the first single from their second studio album, The Big Area. The song was their biggest UK hit, reaching No. 13 on the UK Singles Chart in January 1989.

== Critical reception ==
Upon its release, Jerry Smith of Music Week called it an "anthemic track" that "sounds promising in a blusteringly catchy sort of way".

== Track listing ==
12-inch single

A. "Big Area" (12-inch mix)
B1. "The Big Sweep" (dance mix)
B2. "The Motive" (USA mix)
