= How Do I Make You =

Single by Linda Ronstadt

from the album Mad Love
- B-side: "Rambler Gambler"
- Released: January 1980
- Genre: Rock; power pop; new wave
- Length: 2:25
- Label: Asylum
- Songwriter: Billy Steinberg
- Producer: Peter Asher

Linda Ronstadt singles chronology
"Alison" (1979)	"How Do I Make You" (1980)	"Hurt So Bad" (1980)

"How Do I Make You" is a song composed by Billy Steinberg and recorded by Linda Ronstadt in 1980, reaching the top 10 in the United States.

== Writing and recording ==
Steinberg stated that he was "a little bit influenced" by the Knack hit "My Sharona" in writing "How Do I Make You". He originally recorded the song with his band Billy Thermal as one of several demos produced while the band was signed to Planet Records. The label ultimately did not release these songs. However, several Billy Thermal demos, including "How Do I Make You", were eventually included on a Billy Thermal EP released by Kinetic Records, a Los Angeles-based independent label.

According to Steinberg, the song's later rise to fame was born from a relationship between Billy Thermal's guitarist, Craig Hull, and Wendy Waldman, a backing vocalist for Linda Ronstadt's live shows: "without asking my permission or anything, Wendy and Craig played the Billy Thermal demos for Linda Ronstadt, and Linda liked the song 'How Do I Make You.'"

== Release ==
"How Do I Make You", which featured Nicolette Larson on backing vocals, was released as an advance single from the album Mad Love. It exemplified Ronstadt's change to a harder-edged style, propelling her stardom briefly in the direction of new wave. Shipped on January 15, 1980, "How Do I Make You" hit number 6 on the Cash Box Top 100 chart. On the Billboard Hot 100, it reached a peak of number 10.

A non-album track, Ronstadt's version of the traditional "Rambler Gambler", was the B-side of "How Do I Make You" and was serviced to C&W radio, charting on the Billboard C&W chart at number 42.

"How Do I Make You" appeared in the U.S. Top 10 for several weeks during March and April 1980. The track hit number 1 on many AOR (Album Oriented Rock) stations' charts. The single was also successful in Australia (number 19) and New Zealand (number 3).

A live version, recorded for an HBO special in April 1980, is included in the 2019 release "Live In Hollywood".

== Critical reception ==
AllMusic critic Mike DeGagne assessed "How Do I Make You" as "a far cry from the ballads, the love songs, and the ample amount of cover versions that [Ronstadt] had charted with in the past" saying "[the track's] quick tempo and pulsating pace had Ronstadt showing some new wave spunk mixed with a desire to rock out a little." However, Rolling Stone critic Stephen Holden, felt that on "How Do I Make You" Ronstadt "frankly imitates Deborah Harry," the lead vocalist of defining new wave act Blondie. He further described the song as "Buddy Holly-like" and that it roughly brackets "How Do I Make You" with earlier Ronstadt hits "That'll Be the Day" (1976) and "It's So Easy" (1977), both remakes of Buddy Holly records.

== Cover versions ==
The 1980 album Chipmunk Punk by Alvin and the Chipmunks featured a cover of How Do I Make You.

In 2019, Australian hard rock band Baby Animals released a version as the lead single from their first greatest hits album.

== Charts ==
=== Weekly charts ===
Chart (1980)	Peak position
Australia (Kent Music Report)	19
Canada Top Singles (RPM)	15
New Zealand (Recorded Music NZ)	30
US Billboard Hot 100	10

=== Year-end charts ===
Year-end chart (1980)	Rank
US Top Pop Singles (Billboard)	68
