= Don't Tell Me What to Do (Baby Animals song) =

1994 single by Baby Animals

- Australian CD single cover

Single by Baby Animals

from the album Shaved and Dangerous
- B-side: "Harmony Children"
- Released: 28 June 1993
- Length: 4:11
- Label: Imago
- Songwriter(s): Suze DeMarchi; Eddie Parise; Dave Leslie
- Producer(s): Ed Stasium

Baby Animals singles chronology
"Impossible to Fly" (1992)	"Don't Tell Me What to Do" (1993)	"At the End of the Day" / "Backbone" (1993)

"Don't Tell Me What to Do" is a song by Australian rock band Baby Animals. It was released in June 1993 as the first single from their second studio album, Shaved and Dangerous (1993). The song peaked at number 24 on the Australian ARIA Singles Chart.

== Track listings ==
CD single

1. "Don't Tell Me What to Do" – 4:11
2. "Harmony Children" – 3:32

== Charts ==
Chart (1993)	Peak position
Australia (ARIA)	24
