= Hipnotation =

Album by Dale Barlow

Studio album by Dale Barlow
- Released: 1991
- Recorded: July 1990
- Studio: Sound on Sound, New York City
- Genre: Jazz
- Label: Spiral Scratch
- Producer: Dale Barlow, Matt Dickson

Dale Barlow chronology
Horn (1990)	Hipnotation (1991)	Dale Barlow Live (1995)

Hipnotation is a studio album by Australian jazz musician Dale Barlow, and released in 1991.

At the ARIA Music Awards of 1992 the album won the ARIA Award for Best Jazz Album.

== Track listing ==
1. "Thick As Thieves" (Dale Barlow) - 8:08
2. "Hipnotation" (Barlow) - 9:01
3. "Nothing's Enough" (Barlow) - 6:14
4. "Bunyip" (Barlow) - 9:52
5. "The Brahmin's Son" (Kevin Hays) - 9:31
6. "Paradisiac" (Barlow) - 7:31

== Personnel ==
- Dale Barlow - saxophone
- Essiet Okon Essiet - bass
- Billy Drummond - drums
- Kevin Hays - piano
- Eddie Henderson - trumpet
