= Ain't Gonna Get =

- Australian CD single cover

Single by Baby Animals

from the album Baby Animals
- Released: 6 April 1992
- Recorded: Bearsville (Woodstock, New York); Second City (Long Island, New York)
- Length: 2:57
- Label: Imago
- Songwriter(s): Suze DeMarchi; Steve Elton
- Producer(s): Mike Chapman

Baby Animals singles chronology
| "One Word" (1992) | "Ain't Gonna Get" (1992) | "Impossible to Fly" (1992) |

"Ain't Gonna Get" is a song by Australian rock band Baby Animals. It was released in April 1992 as the fifth and final single from their debut studio album, Baby Animals (1991). The song peaked at number 65 on the Australian ARIA Singles Chart.

== Track listings ==
Australian CD single

1. "Ain't Gonna Get" – 2:57
2. "Rush You" (live) – 4:18
3. "Early Warning" (live) – 4:05
4. "Painless" (live) – 4:08
- Live tracks were recorded at Network Nine, Melbourne, on 25 September 1991

== Charts ==
| Chart (1992) | Peak position |
|---|---|
| Australia (ARIA) | 65 |
