= This Is Not the End (Baby Animals album) =

Studio album by Baby Animals
- Released: 31 May 2013
- Recorded: Blackfoot Sound, Sydney
- Genre: Rock
- Length: 46:50
- Label: Social Family Records
- Producer: David Nicholas

Baby Animals chronology
Il Grande Silenzio (2008)	This Is Not the End (2013)	BA25 (2016)

Singles from This Is Not the End
- 1. "Email " Released: 12 April 2013; 2. "Stitch " Released: 8 July 2013

This Is Not the End is the fourth studio album by Australian band Baby Animals, released in May 2013. The album comes two decades since their last full-length studio album. The album debuted and peaked at number 19, becoming the band's third top 20 album. The album debuted at number 3 on the Australian indie chart.

The band promoted the album with the "Feed the Birds" tour throughout Australia in 2013.

== Commercial performance ==
This Is Not the End debuted at number 19 in Australia. Lead singer Suze Demarchi said: "Somehow cracking the top twenty this time around feels better than hitting number one all those years ago. When people tell you it can't be done, it can, and you can do it your way. You can't do it alone but you don't have to compromise".

== Track listing ==
1. "Email" (Dave Leslie, Suze DeMarchi) – 3:42
2. "Bonfires" (Dave Leslie, Suze DeMarchi) – 4:40
3. "Under Your Skin" (Dave Leslie, Suze DeMarchi) – 3:49
4. "Stitch" (Suze DeMarchi) – 3:43
5. "Invisible Dreamer" (Dave Leslie, Suze DeMarchi) – 3:46
6. "Warm Bodies" (Dave Leslie, Suze DeMarchi) – 4:13
7. "Things That Make You Stay" (Dave Leslie, Suze DeMarchi) – 3:46
8. "Priceless" (Dave Leslie, Suze DeMarchi) – 3:15
9. "Hot Air Balloon" (Justin Stanley, Suze DeMarchi) – 4:27
10. "Got It Bad" (Dave Leslie, Suze DeMarchi) – 3:39
11. "Winters Day" (Dave Leslie, Suze DeMarchi) – 4:04

== Personnel ==
- Dave Leslie – guitar, backing vocals
- Dario Bortolin – bass
- Mick Skelton – drums, percussion
- David Nicholas – engineer, producer, mixer
- Stu Hunter – keyboards
- Suze DeMarchi – lead vocals, guitar
- Don Bartley – mastering
- Jez Smith – photography

== Charts ==
Chart (2013)	Peak position
Australian Albums (ARIA)	19

== Release history ==
Country	Date	Format	Label	Catalogue
Australia	31 May 2013	CD, digital download	Social Family	SFR0002
