= 1992 ARIA Music Awards =

Annual Australian music awards

- Date: 6 March 1992
- Venue: World Congress Centre, Melbourne, Victoria

Highlights
- Most wins: Yothu Yindi (5)
- Most nominations: Yothu Yindi (7)
- Website: ariaawards.com.au

Television/radio coverage
- Network: Nine Network

The Sixth Australian Recording Industry Association Music Awards (generally known as the ARIA Music Awards or simply the ARIAs) was held on 6 March 1992 at the World Congress Centre in Melbourne. Hosts were international guest, Julian Lennon and local Richard Wilkins, they were assisted by presenters, Spinal Tap, Rod Stewart, Mick Jones and others to distribute 24 awards. There were live performances and for the first time the awards were televised.

In addition to previous categories, a "Special Achievement Award" was presented to entrepreneur Michael Gudinski and his label Mushroom Records. The ARIA Hall of Fame inducted only one act: Skyhooks.

== Presenters and performers ==
The ARIA Awards ceremony was co-hosted by singer-songwriter Julian Lennon and TV personality Richard Wilkins. Presenters and performers were:

| Presenter(s) | Performer(s) | Ref. |
|---|---|---|
| Phil Collins | Jimmy Barnes | |
| Tim Farriss, Kirk Pengilly | Jimmy Barnes | |
| Dave Faulkner | James Blundell, James Reyne | |
| Tim Finn | James Blundell, James Reyne | |
| Colin Hay | Deborah Conway, Vika and Linda – "Release Me" | |
| Mick Jones | Crowded House | |
| Grace Knight | Diesel | |
| Sophie Lee | Diesel | |
| Craig McLachlan | Tommy Emmanuel | |
| Martika | Tommy Emmanuel | |
| Molly Meldrum | Julian Lennon, Jenny Morris | |
| Dannii Minogue | Wendy Matthews | |
| Doc Neeson | Noiseworks | |
| Troy Newman | Noiseworks | |
| Rubbery Figures | Margaret Urlich | |
| Spinal Tap | Margaret Urlich | |
| Rod Stewart | Rockmelons | |
| Margaret Urlich | Rockmelons | |
| Anthony Warlow | Yothu Yindi | |

== Awards ==
Nominees for most awards are shown in plain, with winners in bold.

=== ARIA Awards ===
- Album of the Year
  - **Baby Animals – Baby Animals**
    - Jimmy Barnes – Soul Deep
    - Deborah Conway – String of Pearls
    - Crowded House – Woodface
    - Died Pretty – Doughboy Hollow
- Single of the Year
  - **Yothu Yindi – "Treaty (Filthy Lucre Remix)"**
    - Baby Animals – "Early Warning"
    - Jimmy Barnes & John Farnham – "When Something Is Wrong with My Baby"
    - Daryl Braithwaite – "The Horses"
    - Deborah Conway – "It's Only the Beginning"
- Highest Selling Album
  - **Jimmy Barnes – Soul Deep**
    - Cold Chisel – Chisel
    - Crowded House – Woodface
    - Ratcat – Blind Love
    - Noiseworks – Love Versus Money
    - John Farnham – Full House
- Highest Selling Single
  - **Melissa – "Read My Lips"**
    - Daryl Braithwaite – "The Horses"
    - Jimmy Barnes & John Farnham – "When Something Is Wrong with My Baby"
    - Screaming Jets – "Better"
    - Jenny Morris – "Break in the Weather"
- Best Group
  - **INXS – Live Baby Live**
    - Baby Animals – Baby Animals
    - Black Sorrows – "Never Let Me Go"
    - Crowded House – Woodface
    - Hunters & Collectors – "Where Do You Go?"
- Best Female Artist
  - **Deborah Conway – String of Pearls**
    - Kate Ceberano – Think About It!
    - Kylie Minogue – Let's Get to It
    - Wendy Matthews – "Let's Kiss (Like Angels Do)"
    - Jenny Morris – Honeychild
- Best Male Artist
  - **Jimmy Barnes – Soul Deep**
    - Daryl Braithwaite – "The Horses"
    - Tommy Emmanuel – Determination
    - John Farnham – Full House
    - Richard Pleasance – Galleon
- Best New Talent
  - **Underground Lovers – Underground Lovers**
    - Degenerates – Out of My Head
    - Euphoria – "Love You Right"
    - Melissa – "Read My Lips"
    - Jo Beth Taylor – "99 Reasons"
- Breakthrough Artist – Album
  - **Baby Animals – Baby Animals**
    - Clouds – Penny Century
    - Deborah Conway – String of Pearls
    - Ratcat – Blind Love
    - Richard Pleasance – Galleon
- Breakthrough Artist – Single
  - **Baby Animals – "Early Warning"**
    - Deborah Conway – "It's Only the Beginning"
    - Maybe Dolls – "Nervous Kid"
    - Troy Newman – "Love Gets Rough"
    - Richard Pleasance – "Sarah (I Miss You)"
- Best Country Album
  - **Anne Kirkpatrick – Out of the Blue**
    - James Blundell – "Time on His Hands"
    - Graeme Connors – Tropicali
    - Keith Urban – "Only You"
    - John Williamson – Waratah St
- Best Independent Release
  - **Not Drowning, Waving – Proof**
    - The Aints – Ascension
    - Def FX – Water
    - Ed Kuepper – Honey Steel's Gold
    - Underground Lovers – Underground Lovers
- Best Indigenous Release
  - **Yothu Yindi – Tribal Voice**
    - Archie Roach – "Down City Streets"
    - Kev Carmody – Eulogy (For a Black Person)
    - Shane Howard – "Escape from Reality"
    - Not Drowning, Waving & The Musicians of Rabaul, Papua New Guinea featuring George Telek – Tabaran
- Best Adult Contemporary Album
  - **Tommy Emmanuel – Determination**
    - Debbie Byrne – Caught in the Act
    - Grace Knight – Stormy Weather
    - Monica & the Moochers – Cotton on the Breeze
    - John Williamson – Waratah St
- Best Comedy Release
  - **John Clarke & Bryan Dawe – The Annual Report**
    - Agro – Agro Too
    - Rodney Rude – A Legend
    - Rubbery Figures – "Recession Rap"
    - Kevin Bloody Wilson – Let's Call Him Kev

=== Fine Arts Awards ===
- Best Jazz Album
  - **Dale Barlow – Hipnotation**
    - James Morrison – Manner Dangerous
    - Mike Nock Quartet – Dark and Curious
    - Carl Orr – Seeking Spirit
    - Ten Part Invention – Ten Part Invention
- Best Classical Album
  - **Stuart Challender, Sydney Symphony Orchestra – Vine: 3 Symphonies**
    - Australian Ensemble – Cafe Concertino
    - The Australian Opera – Mozart Arias & Scenes
    - Geoffrey Lancaster – Fortepiano
    - Roger Woodward – Prokofiev Piano Works
- Best Children's Album
  - **Peter Combe – The Absolutely Very Best of Peter Combe (So Far) Recorded in Concert**
    - Agro – Agro Too
    - Ruth Cracknell – Paul Gallico's The Snow Goose
    - Noni Hazlehurst – Noni Sings Day and Night Songs and Rhymes from Play School
    - Franciscus Henri – Dancing in the Kitchen
- Best Original Soundtrack / Cast / Show Recording
  - **Mario Millo – Brides of Christ**
    - Jan Castor – Red Express
    - Not Drowning, Waving – Proof Soundtrack
    - Original Australian Cast – Return to the Forbidden Planet
    - Original Motion Picture Soundtrack for Philip Judd – Death in Brunswick

=== Artisan Awards ===
- Song of the Year
  - **Mandawuy Yunupingu, Gurrumul Yunupingu, Milkayngu Mununggurr, Stuart Kellaway, Paul Kelly, Cal Williams – Yothu Yindi – "Treaty"**
    - Phil Buckle – Southern Sons – "Hold Me in Your Arms"
    - Suze DeMarchi, Eddie Parise, Dave Leslie – Baby Animals – "Early Warning"
    - Deborah Conway, Scott Cutler – Deborah Conway – "It's Only the Beginning"
    - Neil Finn – Crowded House – "Fall at Your Feet"
- Producer of the Year
  - **Simon Hussey** – **Craig McLachlan** – **"On My Own"**; **Daryl Braithwaite** – **"The Horses"**, **"Higher than Hope"**, **"Don't Hold Back Your Love"**; **James Reyne** – **"Slave"**
    - Mark Moffatt, Gavin Campbell, Robert Goodge, Paul Main – Yothu Yindi – "Treaty (Filthy Lucre Remix)"
    - Nick Mainsbridge – Def FX – "Water"; – Ratcat – "Blind Love Don't Go Now"; – Tall Tales and True – "Lifeboat"
    - Richard Pleasance – Richard Pleasance – "Don't Cry"; Deborah Conway – "It's Only the Beginning", "Release Me", "White Roses"
    - Ross Fraser – Southern Sons – "Hold Me in Your Arms"; John Farnham – "In Days to Come", "That's Freedom"
- Engineer of the Year
  - **David Price, Ted Howard, Greg Henderson, Simon Polinski – Yothu Yindi – "Maralitja", "Dharpa", "Treaty", "Treaty (Filthy Lucre Remix)", "Tribal Voice"**
    - Peter Cobbin – Grace Knight – "Crazy", "Fever", "Stormy Weather", "That Ole Devil Called Love"
    - Paul Kosky – Crowded House – "Chocolate Cake", "Woodface"
    - Nick Mainsbridge – Def FX – "Water"; – Ratcat – "Blind Love Don't Go Now"; – Tall Tales and True – "Lifeboat"
    - Doug Roberts – Deborah Conway – "Release Me", "White Roses", "Someday"
- Best Video
  - **John Hillcoat – Crowded House – "Chocolate Cake"**
    - Paul Elliott – Boom Crash Opera – "Holywater"
    - Stephen Johnson – Yothu Yindi – "Treaty (Filthy Lucre Remix)"
    - Marcel Lunam – Died Pretty – "D.C."
    - Brendon Young – Tall Tales and True – "Lifeboat"
- Best Cover Art
  - **Louise Beach, Mushroom Art – Yothu Yindi – Tribal Voice**
    - Pierre Baroni, Mushroom Art – Jimmy Barnes – Soul Deep
    - Pierre Baroni, Mushroom Art – Deborah Conway – String of Pearls
    - Richard Pleasance, Ross Hipwell – Richard Pleasance – Galleon
    - Tommy Steele, Nick Seymour – Crowded House – Woodface

== Special Achievement Award ==
- Michael Gudinski & Mushroom Records

== ARIA Hall of Fame inductee ==
The Hall of Fame inductee was:

- Skyhooks
