= Impossible to Fly =

1992 single by Baby Animals

- Australian CD single cover

Single by Baby Animals
- Released: 19 October 1992
- Length: 3:15
- Label: Imago
- Songwriter(s): Suze DeMarchi; Steve Elton
- Producer(s): Mike Chapman

Baby Animals singles chronology
"Ain't Gonna Get" (1992)	"Impossible to Fly" (1992)	"Don't Tell Me What to Do" (1993)

"Impossible to Fly" is a song by Australian rock band Baby Animals. It was released in October 1992 and was the first new music from the band since the release of the multi-platinum selling debut studio album, Baby Animals (1991). The song peaked at number 48 on the Australian Singles Chart.

== Track listings ==
Australian CD single

1. "Impossible to Fly" – 3:15
2. "Waste of Time" (Live) – 5:03
3. "Big Time Friends" (Live) – 6:25
4. "Impossible to Fly" (Live) – 3:57
- Live tracks were recorded at Newcastle Civic Theatre, New South Wales in June 1992.

== Charts ==
Chart (1992)	Peak position
Australia (ARIA)	48
