= Shaved and Dangerous =

Studio album by Baby Animals
- Released: 30 August 1993
- Recorded: Compass Point Studios, Nassau; Bearsville Studio, New York
- Genre: Rock
- Length: 44:15
- Label: BMG Arista/Ariola Limited
- Producer: Ed Stasium, Nuno Bettencourt

Baby Animals chronology
Baby Animals (1991)	Shaved and Dangerous (1993)	Il Grande Silenzio (2008)

Singles from Shaved and Dangerous
- 1. "Don't Tell Me What to Do" Released: June 1993; 2. "At the End of the Day / Backbone" Released: October 1993; 3. "Lights Out at Eleven" Released: January 1994

Professional ratings
Review scores
Source	Rating
Allmusic	3/5 stars

Shaved and Dangerous is the second studio album by Australian band the Baby Animals, released in August 1993.

== Track listing ==
All tracks written by Suze DeMarchi, Dave Leslie and Eddie Parise unless otherwise noted.

1. "Backbone" - 5:18
2. "Stoopid" (Suze DeMarchi, Eddie Parise) - 2:48
3. "Don't Tell Me What to Do" - 4:11
4. "Lights Out at Eleven" - 5:29
5. "At the End of the Day" (Suze DeMarchi, Eddie Parise) - 2:50
6. "Lovin' Lies" (Suze DeMarchi, Steve Elson, Frank Celenza, Dave Leslie, Eddie Parise) - 3:32
7. "Bupata" - 3:58
8. "Nervous at Night" - 4:00
9. "Because I Can" (Nuno Bettencourt, Suze DeMarchi) - 3:38
10. "Life From a Distance" - 4:26
11. "Be My Friend" (Andy Fraser, Paul Rodgers) - 4:04

== Charts and certifications ==
=== Weekly charts ===
Chart (1993)	Peak position
Australian Albums (ARIA)	2

== Certifications ==
Region	Certification	Certified units/sales
Australia (ARIA)	Gold	35,000^{^}
^{^} Shipments figures based on certification alone.

== Personnel ==
- Dave Leslie - Guitar, Vocals
- Frank Celenza - Drums
- Suze DeMarchi - Vocals, Guitar
- Eddie Parise - Bass, Vocals
- Nuno Bettencourt - Guitar (Acoustic), Guitar, Vocals
- John DeChristopher - Strings, Cymbals, Stick
- Tony Italia - Drums
- Bill O'Meara - Strings, Cymbals, Stick

== Credits ==
- Michael Halsband - Photography
- Paul Hamingson - Engineer
- Gail Marowitz - Art Direction, Design
- Carl Nappa - Assistant Engineer
- Richard Parsons - Engineer, Assistant Engineer
- Bob St. John - Engineer
- Ed Stasium - Producer, Engineer, Mixing
- Nuno Bettencourt - Producer
