= First (The Sound of Music) =

Studio album by Then Jerico
- Released: 21 September 1987
- Genre: Rock, new wave
- Label: London; MCA
- Producer: Owen Davies; Steve Brown

Then Jerico chronology
First (The Sound of Music) (1987)	The Big Area (1989)

First (The Sound of Music) is the debut album by English rock band Then Jerico, released in 1987. The album includes four singles which reached the UK Singles Chart: "Muscle Deep" (No. 85, re-release No. 48), "Let Her Fall" (No. 65), "Prairie Rose" (No. 89), and "The Motive" (No. 18). The album reached No. 35 on the UK Albums Chart.

== Track listing ==
All tracks written by Then Jerico, except where noted.

1. "Let Her Fall"
2. "Blessed Days"
3. "Laughter Party"
4. "Stable Boy"
5. "The Motive"
6. "Muscle Deep"
7. "A Quiet Place (Apathy and Sympathy)"
8. "Play Dead"
9. "The Hitcher"
10. "Prairie Rose" (Bryan Ferry, Phil Manzanera)
11. "Blessed Days (The Tokyo Mix)"
12. "Fault (Dub)" (produced by Martin Rushent)
