= Lights Out at Eleven =

- Australian CD single cover

Single by Baby Animals

from the album Shaved and Dangerous
- B-side: "Indian Mystery"
- Released: 10 January 1994
- Length: 5:31
- Label: Imago
- Songwriter(s): Suze DeMarchi; Eddie Parise; Dave Leslie
- Producer(s): Ed Stasium

Baby Animals singles chronology
"At the End of the Day" / "Backbone" (1993)	"Lights Out at Eleven" (1994)	"Email" (2013)

"Lights Out at Eleven" is a song by Australian rock group Baby Animals. It was released in January 1994 as the third and final single from their second studio album, Shaved and Dangerous (1993). The group's last single for 19 years, "Lights Out at Eleven" peaked at number 54 on the Australian ARIA Singles Chart.

On the inside sleeve of the single is written:

"You can't confide in suicide
You can't pretend it's a justified end
Look for the spirit by your side
He's holding hands with you my friend"

== Track listings ==
CD single

1. "Lights Out at Eleven" – 5:31
2. "Indian Mystery" – 3:57

== Charts ==
Chart (1994)	Peak position
Australia (ARIA)	54
