= The Motive (song) =

Single by Then Jerico

from the album First (The Sound of Music)
- Released: 1987
- Genre: Pop rock, alternative rock, new wave
- Length: 4:46
- Label: London Records
- Songwriter: Then Jerico
- Producers: Owen Davies, Mark Shaw

Then Jerico singles chronology
"Prairie Rose" (1987)	"The Motive" (1987)	"Muscle Deep" (1987)

"The Motive", also titled as "The Motive (Living Without You)", is a song by English rock band Then Jerico, released as a single from their debut album, First (The Sound of Music). The song was their first hit single, reaching the top 20 and peaking at No. 18 on the UK Singles Chart in July 1987.

== Music video ==
The official music video for the song was directed by Andy Morahan.

== Track listing ==
12" single

A. "The Motive" (Extended) - 5:55
B1. "The Word" - 3:51
B2. "The Motive" (Midnight Mix) - 5:55

== Charts ==
=== Weekly charts ===
Chart (1987–1988)	Peak position
Australia (Kent Music Report)	89
Italy Airplay (Music & Media)	4
UK Singles (OCC)	18
