= Then Jerico =

English rock band

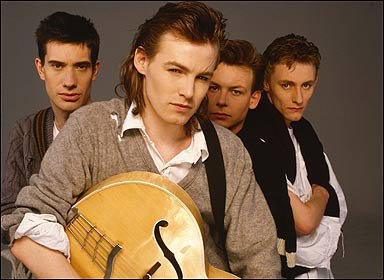

Background information
- Origin: London, England
- Genres: Alternative rock; pop rock; new wave
- Years active: 1983–1990, 1998–present
- Label: London Records
- Members: Mark Shaw; Magnus Box (bass); Ryan Williams (guitar); Paul Davis (drums)
- Past members: Jasper Stainthorpe; Scott Taylor; Steve Wren; Rob Downes; Mark Sanderson; Ben Angwin; Chris Youdell; Alex Mungo; Keith Airey; John Miller; Justin McConville
- Website: www.thenjerico.com

Then Jerico are an English rock band. They had five top 50 hits in the UK during the 1980s.

== Career ==
The band's early line-up included singer Mark Shaw, bassist Jasper Stainthorpe, drummer Steve Wren, and guitarist Scott Taylor.

The band played at The Limelight Club in New York in 1983 and signed to London Records in 1984. The single "The Big Sweep" was recorded for London but they objected to the lyrical subject matter (an anti-Robert Maxwell/Rupert Murdoch statement). It was initially released by the track's producer Martin Rushent on his own Immaculate label in 1985 and later as a limited edition by London Records along with the new song "Fault".

The band's songs "Muscle Deep" and "The Motive" charted in 1987. They enjoyed success with two albums, First (The Sound of Music) (1987) co-produced by Shaw and Owen Davies, which reached number 35 in the UK Albums Chart, followed by The Big Area in 1989 that went gold and reached number 4 in the UK Albums Chart. Rick Nowels produced several tracks on the album - this led to the appearance of Belinda Carlisle on background vocals on "What Does It Take", released as the second single.

Released in 1988, ahead of the group's second album, "Big Area" achieved their greatest chart success, peaking at number 13 in the UK Singles Chart.

The original Then Jerico line-up split up in early 1990, with Mark Shaw leaving the band to pursue a solo career. He released his only studio album, Almost, for EMI in 1991. It was produced by guitarist Andy Taylor and included two singles, "Love So Bright" and "Under Your Spell". Shaw performed a few small club gigs in 1993 with Taylor under the name "Then Jerico 2".

In 1998, Shaw re-activated Then Jerico, writing the material for Orgasmaphobia, a self-financed album released on Eagle Rock. The album was co-produced by Mark Shaw and Andy Taylor with collaborations from Taylor, Simple Minds' keyboard player Mick MacNeil and author Iain Banks. In 2000, a live album, Alive & Exposed, was released by Yeaah! Records credited to 'Then Jerico... Mark Shaw Etc.'. It was a recording made in the summer of 1992 of a concert at the Grand Theatre, Clapham in London. It contained a new song, "Step into the Light".

Shaw embarked on a new Then Jerico tour in 2012 with an original line-up of the band, made up of Mark Shaw, guitarists Rob Downes and Scott Taylor, bass player Jasper Stainthorpe and drummer Steve Wren.

A 'Reprise Tour' was launched for 2013 to promote the release of the Reprise compilation album on Warner / Rhino Music with a number of appearances including at Henley's Rewind the 80s Music and at the Let's Rock Bristol festivals.

In February 2014, the 'original' Then Jerico discontinued; however, lead singer Mark Shaw continued, as he vowed to do, with a new line-up to fulfill Let's Rock festival dates in May, June and July that year. In 2015, Shaw played club shows prior to a performance at "Let's Rock London", on Clapham Common, London, on 16 July 2016. Mark Shaw has also worked intermittently with singer Tony Hadley and the SAS Band.

On 27 April 2020, guitarist Scott Taylor died at the age of 58 from a brain tumour.

== Band members ==
=== Current ===
- Mark Shaw (born Mark Robert Tiplady, 10 June 1961, Chesterfield, Derbyshire, England) – vocals (1983–1990, 1998–present)
- Ryan Williams – guitar
- Magnus Box – bass
- Paul Davis – drums

=== Former ===
- Jasper Stainthorpe (born 18 February 1958, Tonbridge, Kent, England) – bass (1983–1989 / 2012–2013)
- Steve Wren (born 26 October 1962, Lambeth, London, England) – drums (1983–1989 / 2012–?)
- Scott Taylor (31 December 1961, Redhill, Surrey, England – 27 April 2020) – guitar (1984–1989 / 2012–2020)
- Cliff Lawrence – guitar (1983)
- Mark Sanderson (born 1961) – keyboards (1983)
- Ben Angwin – keyboards (1984–1985)
- Alex Mungo – keyboards (1985–1988)
- Bari Goddard – backing vocals (live performances, 1980s)
- Steve Lee – backing vocals (live performances, 1980s)
- Rob Downes (born 7 December 1961, Cheadle Hulme, Cheshire, England) – guitar (1987–1989 / 2012–?)
- Chris Youdell – keyboards (1988–1989)
- Keith Airey (replaced Scott Taylor on guitar for the Big Area tour in 1989)
- Justin McConville (2010s shows)
- John Miller (2010s shows)
- Paul Davis (2010s shows)
- PJ Phillips – bass/backing vocals (1998–2016)

== Discography ==
=== Albums ===
Year	Album	UK
1987	First (The Sound of Music)	35
1989	The Big Area	4
1991	Almost... (Mark Shaw, solo)	—
1994	Electric	—
1997	Radio Jerico (2 CD)	—
1998	Orgasmaphobia	—
1999	The Best Of...	—
2000	Alive & Exposed	—
2012	First (The Sound of Music) (25th Anniversary Expanded Edition)	—
2012	Jewels in Time: Rarities & Unreleased Tracks	—
2012	Big Area (reissue)	—
2012	Acoustic Live (CD/DVD)	—
2013	Reprise (compilation)	—
2013	Acoustic: Live London 2012 (CD only)	—
2024	Before the Future 1984-1989	50
"—" denotes releases that did not chart.

=== Singles ===
Year	Single	Peak chart positions					Album
Year	Single	AUS	BE	IRE	NL	UK	Album
1985	"The Big Sweep"	—	—	—	—	—	Non-album single
1985	"Fault"	—	—	—	—	—	First (The Sound of Music)
1986	"Muscle Deep"	—	—	—	—	85	First (The Sound of Music)
1987	"Let Her Fall"	—	—	—	—	65	First (The Sound of Music)
1987	"Prairie Rose"	—	—	—	—	89	First (The Sound of Music)
1987	"The Motive"	89	37	8	32	18	First (The Sound of Music)
1987	"Muscle Deep" (reissue)	—	—	—	—	48	First (The Sound of Music)
1989	"Big Area"	—	—	10	—	13	The Big Area
1989	"What Does It Take?" (featuring Belinda Carlisle)	154	—	26	—	33	The Big Area
1989	"Sugar Box"	—	—	—	—	22	The Big Area
1996	"The Motive '96" (Spain-only release)	—	—	—	—	—	Non-album single
1997	"Big Area '97" (Spain-only release)	—	—	—	—	—	Non-album single
"—" denotes releases that did not chart or were not released in that territory.
