= Social Family Records =

- Industry: Music, entertainment
- Founded: 2012
- Headquarters: Sydney, North Sydney, Australia
- Products: Music, entertainment
- Website: Official website

Social Family Records is an independent record label in Australia. All Social Family Records releases are distributed in Australia by EMI Music Australia/Universal Music Australia and internationally by The Orchard.Social Family Records is fully accredited by ARIA and report sales daily for chart inclusion.

The first album released by Social Family Records was This Is not the End by Baby Animals in May 2013. The album peaked at 19 on the ARIA Chart.

== Current artists ==
- Caroline Jones
- Cormac Neeson
- Glenn Shorrock
- Shannon Noll
- Gretta Ziller
- Andrew Swift
- Hayley Jensen
- Jetty Road
- Kirsty Lee Acres
- Neilly Rich
- Emily Hatton
