= Mark Shaw (singer) =

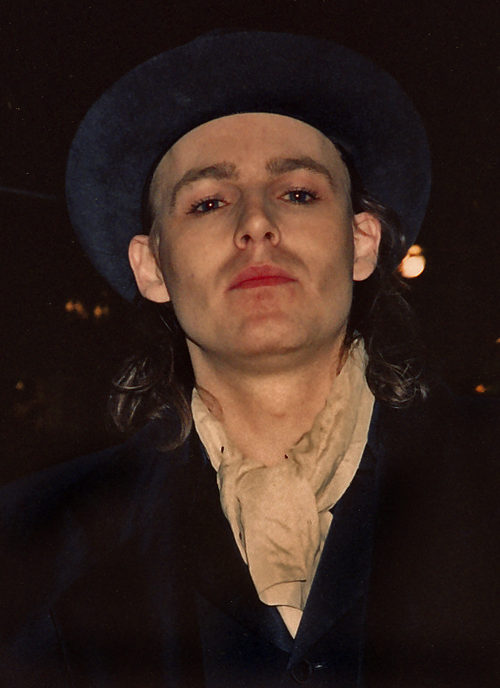
- Mark Shaw of Then Jerico, Newcastle upon Tyne, 1988

Background information
- Born: Mark Robert Tiplady; 10 June 1961 (age 65); Chesterfield, Derbyshire, England
- Genres: Rock, pop rock
- Occupations: Singer, songwriter, actor
- Instrument: Vocals
- Years active: 1983–present
- Labels: EMI, Eagle, Murder Records
- Website: http://www.thenjerico.com

Mark Shaw (born Mark Robert Tiplady on 10 June 1961 in Chesterfield, Derbyshire, England) is an English singer and songwriter who formed the 1980s rock band Then Jerico, which he continues to front.

== Music career ==
After the original Then Jerico line-up split in early 1990, Shaw went solo releasing his only studio album, Almost for EMI in 1991.

A live album, Alive & Exposed, recorded in the summer of 1992 at The Grand Theatre, Clapham, London was released by Murder Records in 2000 under the 'Mark Shaw Etc., Then Jerico' banner featuring new song "Step into the Light".

On 12 December 2012, via the official Then Jerico website, Shaw announced details of a 2013 "Reprise" tour consisting of 13 dates around the United Kingdom, culminating in a show at the Clapham Grand in London.

Shaw later toured with a new line-up of Then Jerico. A number of acoustic shows were scheduled to take place in 2018.

In 2022, Shaw was part of Music 4 Ukraine's charity single "Heal This Broken Land". This was a version of "Broken Land" by Northern Irish band The Adventures, which also featured other artists including Nick Heyward, Carol Decker, The Christians and Nathan Moore of Brother Beyond.

== Acting roles ==
In January 1994, Shaw made his acting debut as Johnny in the London production of Bad Boy Johnny and the Prophets of Doom by Daniel Abineri.

== Other activities ==
In 2003, Shaw appeared in the Reborn in the USA reality television series, but abruptly quit the show after just one day of filming.

On 16 May 2020, Then Jerico appeared remotely on the line-up for the 80s Lockdown Fest organised by Let's Rock The Retro Festival. The event raised money for the Child Bereavement UK charity.

== Discography ==
=== Albums ===
- Almost (EMI, 1991)
- Alive & Exposed - as Mark Shaw Etc. (Murder Records, 2000) (re-issued by Then Jerico Music in 2011)

=== Singles ===
- "Love So Bright" (EMI, 1990)
- "Under Your Spell" (EMI, 1991)
