= Rush You =

- Australian CD single cover

Single by Baby Animals

from the album Baby Animals
- B-side: "Big Time Friends"
- Released: 5 August 1991
- Studio: Bearsville (Woodstock, New York); Second City (Long Island, New York)
- Length: 4:10
- Label: Imago
- Songwriter(s): Suze DeMarchi; Eddie Parise; Dave Leslie
- Producer(s): Mike Chapman

Baby Animals singles chronology
"Early Warning" (1991)	"Rush You" (1991)	"Painless" (1991)

"Rush You" is a song by Australian rock band Baby Animals. It was released in August 1991 as their second single from their debut studio album, Baby Animals (1991). The song peaked at number 30 on the Australian ARIA Singles Chart.

== Track listing ==
Vinyl and CD single

1. "Rush You" – 4:10
2. "Big Time Friends" – 4:54

== Charts ==
Chart (1991)	Peak position
Australia (ARIA)	30
