= Early Warning (Baby Animals song) =

- Australian CD single cover

Single by Baby Animals

from the album Baby Animals
- B-side: "Baby Animals"
- Released: 15 April 1991
- Genre: Rock
- Length: 4:02
- Label: Imago; BMG
- Songwriter(s): Suze DeMarchi; Eddie Parise; Dave Leslie
- Producer(s): Mike Chapman

Baby Animals singles chronology
"Early Warning" (1991)	"Rush You" (1991)

Alternative cover
- UK single cover

"Early Warning" is a song by Australian rock band Baby Animals. It was released in April 1991 as their debut single from their debut studio album Baby Animals (1991). The song peaked at number 21 on the Australian ARIA Singles Chart. At the ARIA Music Awards of 1992, the song was nominated for Single of the Year and Song of the Year, losing to "Treaty" by Yothu Yindi.

== Background ==
Baby Animals were formed by Suze DeMarchi, Dave Leslie, Frank Celenza and Eddie Parise in 1989. In August 1990, the president of the newly formed Imago Records, Terry Ellis signed the band after attending a gig. Ellis described the performance, "the band was great, the songs were terrific and to me Suze clearly had that indefineable magic that separates one artist from the crowd and makes them a star." The band flew to New York City to record an album.

== Track listings ==
7-inch single; Australian CD and cassette single

1. "Early Warning"
2. "Baby Animals"

UK CD single

1. "Early Warning"
2. "Baby Animals"
3. "Ain't Gonna Get"
4. "Rush You"

UK 12-inch single

A1. "Early Warning"
B1. "Baby Animals"
B2. "Ain't Gonna Get"

== Charts ==
Chart (1991)	Peak position
Australia (ARIA)	21
