= Daniel Abineri =

English actor, songwriter, playwright

Daniel Abineri (born 8 August 1958) is an English songwriter, actor, director, narrator and playwright known for writing the book, music and lyrics for the controversial rock musical Bad Boy Johnny and the Prophets of Doom. The 1994 London production made national news when it caused grave offence to the Roman Catholic Church and was closed down after just nine performances.

== Career ==
Abineri's father was actor John Abineri and his mother was actress Hilary Bamford. From 1974 to 1998, Abineri worked as an actor, starting his career in repertory theatre in England. He starred as Father Neil opposite Arthur Lowe in the 1970s TV comedy Bless Me, Father, which led to a leading role opposite Tatum O'Neal in International Velvet. In 1979, at the age of 21, he was cast as Frank-n-Furter in the first British tour of The Rocky Horror Show, a role he played subsequently in the West End and over three thousand times on several tours of Australia and New Zealand, which he also directed.

He played the villainous Jake Sanders in the 1980s Australian TV series Return to Eden. He is also credited with giving Russell Crowe his first professional acting role in a production of The Rocky Horror Show in New Zealand in 1986, and he subsequently cast Crowe as the lead in Bad Boy Johnny and The Prophets of Doom in 1989.

Other works as an actor include roles in Noises Off, Secret Army, The Bill, King Cinder, alongside Rik Mayall in Bring Me the Head of Mavis Davis Arnold Beckoff in the Australian production of Torch Song Trilogy and Ben Elton's Popcorn in London's West End.

Abineri has produced and directed several television documentaries, including One Hit Wonders for the BBC in 1997, Walk on the Wild Side for Granada TV, and Murder and Celebrity for UKTV and A Conversation With James Lovelock for Network Films. He is married to TV executive Claudia Rosencrantz, with whom he has one daughter, singer songwriter Lola Aviva. He has three children from a previous marriage: Jennifer, Kate and Joe.

On 20 September 2013, Abineri released a new country/folk-rock album of his songs titled Honey For Sale.
