= Painless (song) =

- Australian CD single cover

Single by Baby Animals

from the album Baby Animals
- B-side: "Dedicate"
- Released: 7 October 1991
- Studio: Bearsville (Woodstock, New York); Second City Studio (Long Island, New York)
- Length: 3:41
- Label: Imago
- Songwriter(s): Suze DeMarchi; Eddie Parise
- Producer(s): Mike Chapman

Baby Animals singles chronology
"Rush You" (1991)	"Painless" (1991)	"One Word" (1992)

Alternative cover
- US single cover

"Painless" is a song by Australian rock band Baby Animals. It was released in October 1991 as the third single from their debut studio album, Baby Animals (1991). The song peaked at number 49 on the Australian ARIA Singles Chart. It became the band's single to chart in New Zealand and on the Billboard Album Rock Tracks chart in 1992 after performing the track on Late Night with David Letterman.

== Track listings ==
Vinyl and CD single

1. "Painless" – 3:41
2. "Dedicate" – 4:53

US CD single

1. "Painless" – 3:41
2. "Album Preview" (mix of "Rush You", "One Word", "Break My Heart") – 5:59

== Charts ==
Chart (1991–1992)	Peak position
Australia (ARIA)	49
New Zealand (Recorded Music NZ)	31
US Album Rock Tracks (Billboard)	29
