= One Word (Baby Animals song) =

- Australian CD single cover

Single by Baby Animals

from the album Baby Animals
- Released: January 1992
- Studio: Bearsville Studio, Woodstock, New York; Second City Studio, Long Island
- Genre: Hard rock; alternative rock
- Length: 4:00
- Label: Imago
- Songwriters: Suze DeMarchi; Steve Elson
- Producer: Mike Chapman

Baby Animals singles chronology
"Painless" (1991)	"One Word" (1992)	"Ain't Gonna Get" (1992)

Alternative cover
- US single cover

"One Word" is a song by Australian rock band Baby Animals. It was released in January 1992 as their fourth single from their debut studio album Baby Animals (1991). The song peaked at number 15 on the ARIA Singles Chart, becoming the band's first top-20 single.

At the ARIA Music Awards of 1993, the song was nominated for Single of the Year and Song of the Year, but lost to "The Day You Went Away" by Wendy Matthews. The song earned Baby Animals a nomination for Best Group, but lost out to "Weather with You" by Crowded House.

On 1 October 2019, the Angels released a version of "One Word" to promote their co-headlines tour with the Baby Animals.

== Track listings ==
Australian CD single (25007)

1. "One Word" – 4:00
2. "One Word" (live) – 3:41
3. "Waste of Time" (live) – 3:54

US CD single (IM 28023)

1. "One Word" (album version) – 3:59
2. "One Word" (edit) – 3:33
3. "One Word" (top 40 edit) – 3:14

== Charts ==
Chart performance for "One Word"
Chart (1992)	Peak position
Australia (ARIA)	15
