= ARIA Awards =

Annual Australian music industry awards

ARIA Music Awards
- Current: 2026 ARIA Music Awards
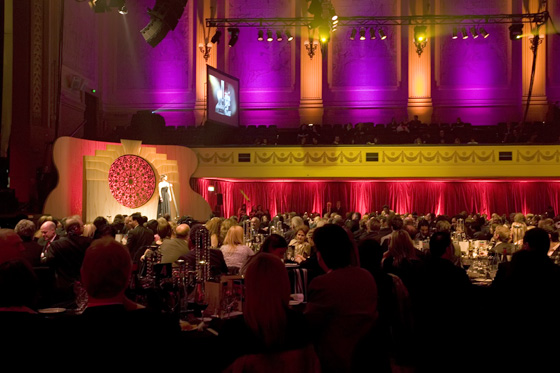
- 2008 ARIA Hall of Fame, at Melbourne Town Hall
- Awarded for: Excellence and innovation in all genres of Australian music.
- Location: Sydney Olympic Park, New South Wales,
- Country: Australia
- Presented by: Australian Recording Industry Association
- First award: 1987; 39 years ago
- Final award: Current
- Website: ariaawards.com.au

Television/radio coverage
- Network: Network 10 (1992–2000, 2002–08, 2010, 2014–16, 2025–present); Nine Network (2001, 2009, 2017–2024); GO! (2011–13); YouTube (2021–present); Stan (2023–24); Paramount+ (2025–present)

Most recent ARIA Award winners
- 18 November 2026
Award	Album of the Year	Best Group
Winner	Tame Impala (Deadbeat)	DMA's (DMA's)
Award	Best Artist
Winner	Tame Impala (Deadbeat)
Previous Album of the Year
Cartoon Darkness
Album of the Year
Deadbeat

The Australian Recording Industry Association Music Awards (commonly known informally as ARIA Music Awards, ARIA Awards, or simply the ARIAs) is an annual series of awards nights celebrating the Australian music industry, put on by the Australian Recording Industry Association (ARIA). The event has been held since 1987 and encompasses the general genre-specific and popular awards (these are what is usually being referred to as "the ARIA awards") as well as Fine Arts Awards and Artisan Awards (held separately from 2004), Achievement Awards and ARIA Hall of Fame – the latter were held separately from 2005 to 2010 but returned to the general ceremony in 2011. For 2010, ARIA introduced public voted awards for the first time.

Winning, or even being nominated for, an ARIA award results in a lot of media attention and publicity on an artist, and usually increases recording sales several-fold, as well as chart significance – in 2005, for example, after Ben Lee won three awards, his album Awake Is the New Sleep jumped from No. 31 to No. 5 in the ARIA Charts, its highest position. In October 1995 singer-songwriter Tina Arena became the first woman to win Album of the Year for Don't Ask (1994) and Song of the Year for "Chains". Before the ceremony the album had achieved 3× platinum (for shipment of 210,000 copies) and by year's end it was 8× platinum (560,000 copies) and had topped the end of year albums chart.

== History ==
In 1983, the Australian Recording Industry Association (ARIA) was established by the six major record companies then operating in Australia, EMI, Festival Records, CBS (now known as Sony Music), RCA (now known as BMG), WEA (now known as Warner Music) and PolyGram (now known as Universal) replacing the Association of Australian Record Manufacturers (AARM) which was formed in 1956. It later included smaller record companies representing independent acts/labels and has over 100 members.

Australian TV pop music show Countdown presented its own annual awards ceremony, Countdown Music and Video Awards, which were co-produced by Carolyn James (also known as Carolyn Bailey) from 1981 to 1984 and, in the latter two years, in collaboration with ARIA. ARIA provided peer voting for some awards, while Countdown provided coupons in the related Countdown Magazine for viewers to vote for populist awards. At the 1985 Countdown awards ceremony, held on 14 April 1986, fans of INXS and Uncanny X-Men scuffled during the broadcast and as a result ARIA decided to hold their own awards. Australian music journalist, Anthony O'Grady, described the fans of Uncanny X-Men, "screeching dismay and derision every time their heroes were denied a prize. Finally, when INXS were announced Best Group and Michael Hutchence walked towards the stage, X-Men fans unfurled a 2-metre banner reading: '@*l! OFF POCK FACE'".

After that ceremony ARIA withdrew their support for the Countdown awards. Meanwhile, four music industry representatives had met in Sydney: a talent manager Peter Rix and three record company executives Brian Harris, Peter Ikin and Gil Robert. Rix summarised the outcome, "the industry deserved a peer-voting Awards night and it needed to be sanctioned by" ARIA. Its "primary purpose was to strive for some sort of objective overview of excellence in recording". Rather than the ARIA board pay the entire cost of the event, "we cooked up a scheme whereby the ARIA Awards would be funded by individual record companies buying tickets for a dinner." Rix and his group approached ARIA board members, Paul Turner (also managing director of WEA) and Brian Smith (BMG's managing director) then-chairperson of ARIA. After several months of arguing for the change, Rix was appointed chair of "a committee to convene the inaugural ARIA Awards".

Starting with the first ceremony, on 2 March 1987, ARIA administered its own entirely peer-voted ARIA Music Awards, to "recognise excellence and innovation in all genres of Australian music" with an annual ceremony. Initially included in the same awards ceremonies, it established the ARIA Hall of Fame in 1988, it held separate annual ceremonies from 2005 to 2010, the Hall of Fame returned to the general ceremony in 2011. The ARIA Hall of Fame "honours Australian musicians' achievements [that] have had a significant impact in Australia or around the world".

The first ceremony, in 1987, featured Elton John as the compere and was held at the Sheraton Wentworth Hotel, Sydney. There were no live performances at the early ARIAs, music for both walk on/walk off was supplied by a nightclub dj, Rick Powell. All subsequent ceremonies were held in Sydney except the 1992 event at World Congress Centre, Melbourne. For 2010, ARIA introduced public voted awards for the first time. Winning, or even being nominated for, an ARIA award results in a lot of media attention and publicity on an artist, and may increase recording sales several-fold, as well as chart significance – in 2005, for example, after Ben Lee won three awards, his album Awake Is the New Sleep jumped from No. 31 to No. 5 in the ARIA Charts, its highest position.

=== Broadcast history ===
The first five ARIA Awards were not televised, at the very first award ceremony on 2 March 1987, the host, Elton John, advised the industry to keep them off television "if you want these Awards to stay fun". In June of that year Countdown still had its own awards ceremony, which was televised, "so there was no thought of going to TV". The first televised ARIA Awards ceremony occurred in 1992, all subsequent ceremonies were televised. They were broadcast on Network Ten from 2002 to 2008 and returned in 2010. Nine Network aired the ceremony on 26 November 2009, its digital channel, GO!, aired the 2011 ARIA Music Awards on 27 November 2011. The 2023 and 2024 ceremonies aired live on Stan with a delayed broadcast on Nine Network and YouTube. In 2025 the awards aired live on Paramount+ with a delayed broadcast on Network 10.

=== Controversy ===
At the 1988 ceremony a fracas developed between band manager, Gary Morris, accepting awards for Midnight Oil, and former Countdown compere, Molly Meldrum, who was presenting. They conflicted over visiting United Kingdom artist, Bryan Ferry, who had also presented an award. Morris objected to Ferry's presence and insulted him, Meldrum defended Ferry and then scuffled with Morris. Also in that year Midnight Oil were nominated for Best Indigenous Record for Diesel and Dust despite having no Indigenous members. Morris objected to that decision by ARIA, "an Indigenous Award should go to an indigenous band". In 1995 electronic music group, Itch-E and Scratch-E, won the inaugural award for "Best Dance Release" for their single, "Sweetness and Light". Band member, Paul Mac thanked Sydney's ecstasy dealers for their help. One of the sponsors of the awards, that year, was the National Drug Offensive. In 2005 Mac explained that he did not expect to win and so had not prepared a speech. His speech was bleeped for the TV broadcast.

During the 2004 voting process, former 3RRR radio DJ Cousin Creep (also known as Craig Barnes), published his user name and password on a music site, Rocknerd, allowing public votes, before being removed from voting two days later. The 2007 ARIA Awards telecast was marred by controversy after it was revealed by the ABC's Media Watch programme that Network Ten had used subliminal advertising during the course of the broadcast, which under the Australian Media and Broadcasting rules is illegal. Network Ten disputed the finding; however, their basis for defence was criticised by Media Watch, demonstrating an ignorance of the rules.

Tony Cohen, a record producer and audio engineer for Nick Cave and the Cruel Sea, who won three Artisan Awards in mid-1990s, described the ARIA Board's determination of general award winners, "I find them a bit hypocritical those ARIAs. I mean, the awards for the technical people are quite honest but the ones for the actual artists, basically the record companies just sit down at a meeting and decide which one of their acts are going to win this year and all, that sort of thing. It's like a promotion thing." He specifically pointed to Gabriella Cilmi's winning six trophies in 2008, "like that girl who won everything... who only had one song. It's a great song but, I mean, I'd rather see a little longevity first... I wish her luck and everything but you just don't, especially with kids that young."

The 2010 telecast was criticised in media reports: Crikey's Neil Walker decried the "infamously shambolic Sydney Opera House fiasco", The Punch's Rebekah Devlin speculated on it being the worst ever telecast, "it felt like we'd stumbled into some raging A-list party and we definitely weren't invited [...] Guests who were there said it was a great night, but it reignites the debate of what the Arias are actually all about... is it an event staged for the musicians and the people there, or is it for a TV audience?", while Daily Telegraph's Kathy McCabe felt the "underlying problem with the past two years' telecasts is they have tried to be all things to all people and do way too much" and advised that ARIA should get "professionals to do the job professionally, give them ample time to rehearse and allow them to protest when the words just don't work". In 2011 Dallas Crane's vocalist and guitarist, Dave Larkin hoped for improvement from ARIA and the telecast, "[s]o gross was last year's 'stubby-on-the-opera-house-steps' screaming match, that it still burns a brutal reflux just thinking what horrible depths our embattled industry and its unfortunate viewership plummeted to on that grievous evening of small screen hell" and felt their main flaw was that the "ARIAs never seem to take enough time or pride educating the masses on our local industry legends ... There never seems to be enough reference or homage paid to great Aussie pop and rock trailblazers who made and continue to make Australian music what it is today".

== Nomination process ==
To be eligible, a release must be commercially available within the specified period for a given year. Material must be previously unrecorded, thus ruling out most live albums. A recording can be nominated within multiple categories, but only one genre category (for example, an album could not be simultaneously nominated for Best Pop Release and Best Dance Release). Re-released recordings are not eligible and compilations are not eligible.

Artists must either be Australian citizens, or have applied for or attained permanent resident status and have resided in Australia for at least six months within the specified period. For bands, at least half the members of the group must meet this requirement. If a recording refers to both an individual and a band (for example, Dan Kelly & the Alpha Males), it must be nominated only the basis of the individual or the band, not mixed or both.

Some categories have further requirements as specified below:

- Album/Single of the Year: Recording must appear in the ARIA Top 100 Albums or Singles chart respectively during the specified period.
- Breakthrough Artist (Album/Single): Artist must not have previously reached the final five nominations in any ARIA awards category for any release, or have been in a group that has done so, or have a previous release in the Top 50 release charts.
- Best Rock Album: "Recording must be directed toward Contemporary Rock, Modern Rock and Active Rock formats."
- Best Adult Contemporary Album: "Recording must be directed toward Adult Contemporary formats."
- Best Pop Release: "Recording must be directed toward CHR/Top 40 formats."
- Best Independent Release: Recording must be released and funded by an ARIA member that is not a member of a multinational corporation.
- Best Music DVD: Compilations may enter this category. Content must be at least 60% original. The release must be eligible to appear on the ARIA Music DVD chart (this means most "bonus disc" releases are unlikely to be eligible).
- Best Comedy Release: Compilations are acceptable. Album, single and DVD releases are all eligible. Content must be 100% original.
- Best Children's Album: Compilations are acceptable (but content must be 100% original, having been recorded specifically for that album). Form and content must be aimed at a pre-teen audience.
- Best Dance Release: Compilations are acceptable. "Artists working primarily within the dance genre, e.g.: House, Techno, Trance, Hardcore, Garage, Breakbeat, Drum & Bass, Disco and Electronica are eligible. In the case of a remixed album or single, the production team(s) and the original recording artist(s) must both meet the artist eligibility criteria, and the release must qualify for inclusion in either the ARIA Album or Single chart."
- Best Urban Release: "Artists working primarily within the urban genre, e.g.: R&B, hip-hop, soul, funk, reggae, and dancehall, are eligible. In the case of a remixed album or single, the production team(s) and the original recording artist(s) must both meet the artist eligibility criteria, and the release must qualify for inclusion in either the ARIA Album or Single chart. The ARIA member must also nominate whether the production team or the original recording artist would be the recipient of the award." This category was discontinued in 2018 and replaced by Best Hip Hop Release and Best Soul/R&B Release from 2019.
- Sales awards: A company may enter up to five recordings in a category. For these categories, the recording does not have to be first released during the specified period, so these categories are two of the few where recordings can be nominated more than once. These categories were discontinued in 2010.

== Judging process ==
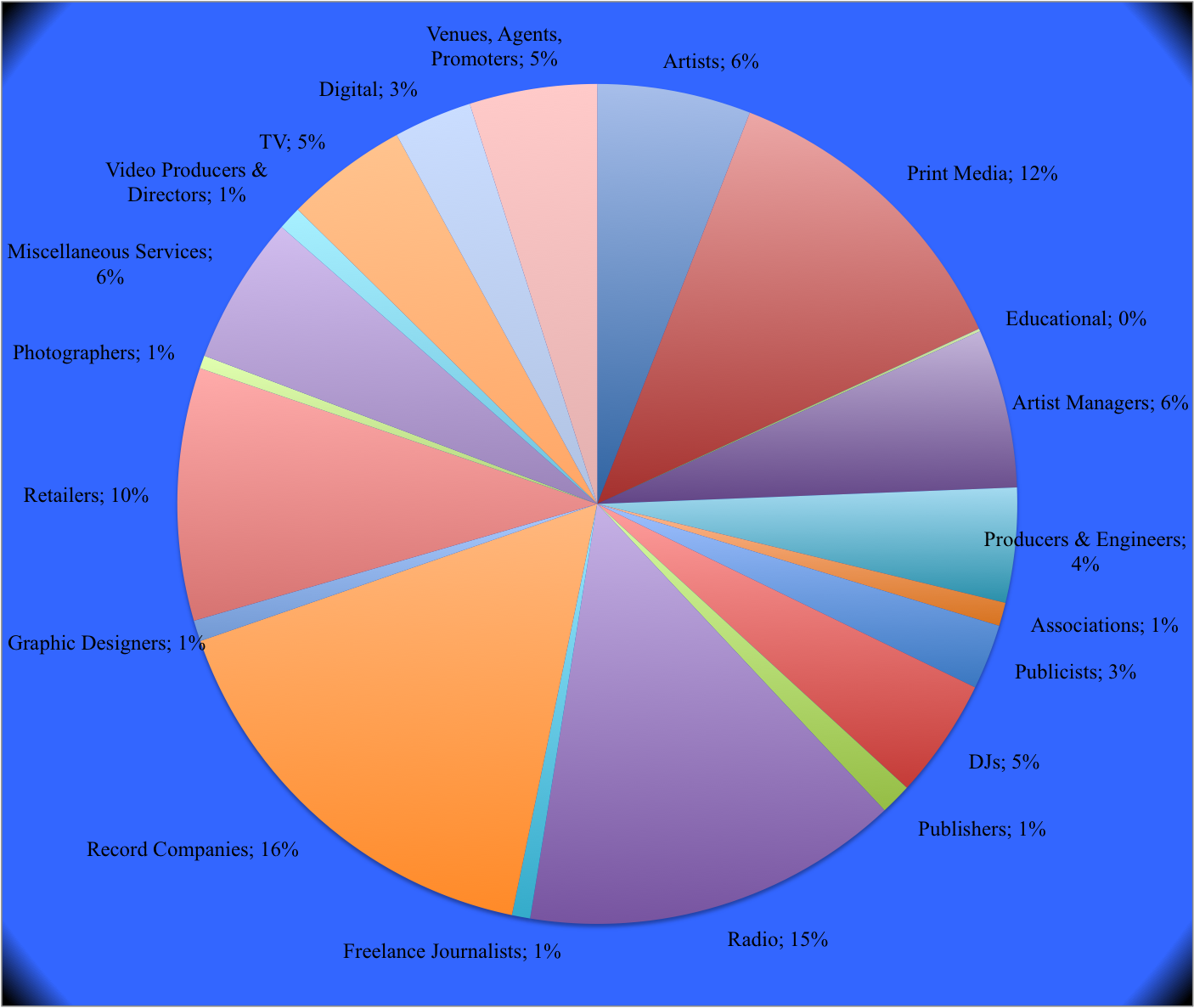
A breakdown of the 2009 judging academy.

Sales awards are judged by an independent audit. The Hall of Fame and Lifetime Achievement awards are awarded at the discretion of the ARIA Board. Genre categories are judged by "voting schools" that consist of 40–100 representatives from that genre. The remaining generalist categories are the "voting academy", which, in 2009, consisted of 1106 representatives from across the music industry.

Members of the academy are kept secret. Membership is by invitation only. An individual record company may have up to eight members on the academy. The only artists eligible to vote are winners and nominees from the previous year's awards.

== Categories ==
The ARIA Awards are given in four fields: ARIA Awards (for general and genre categories), Fine Arts, Artisan and Public Vote. With the exception of the Public Vote field, all award winners and nominees are determined by either a "voting academy" or a "judging school"; the nominees for the public voted categories are determined by ARIA with the public choosing the winner. In the following tables, all the categories are listed in order of the year they were first given; any box in the "last awarded" column that says "N/A" is a current award. The years are linked to their corresponding ceremony and the ordinal numbers beside the year correspond to the order they were presented.

=== Current ===
Category	First awarded	Notes
General Awards
Album of the Year	1987 (1st)	Originally named Best Australian Album (1987–1998)
Best Group	1987 (1st)	Originally named Best Australian Group (1987–1998)
Best Adult Contemporary Album	1987 (1st)	Originally named Best Australian Adult Contemporary Record (1987–1994) and Best Australian Adult Contemporary Release (1995–1998)
Best Country Album	1987 (1st)	Originally named Best Australian Country Record (1987–1994) and Best Australian Country Release (1995–1998)
Best Children's Album	1988 (2nd)	Originally named Best Australian Children's Record (1988–1994) and Best Australian Children's Release (1995–1998). This award was presented in the Fine Arts field from 1988 to 2000.
Best Independent Release	1989 (3rd)	Originally named Best Australian Independent Record (1989–1994) and Best Australian Independent Release (1995–1998)
Best Pop Release	1994 (8th)	Originally named Best Australia Pop Dance Record (1994) and Best Australian Pop Release (1995–1998)
Best Dance Release	1995 (9th)	Originally named Best Australian Dance Release (1995–1998) and Best Dance Artist Release (1999–2003)
Best Rock Album	1998 (12th)	Originally named Best Australian Rock Release (1998)
Best Blues and Roots Album	1999 (13th)	
Breakthrough Artist – Release	2010 (24th)	Originally named Breakthrough Artist (2010), then Breakthrough Artist – Release (2012–2013) and in 2014, it returned to its current title. Not presented in 2011 but reinstated in the following year.
Best Hard Rock or Heavy Metal Album	2010 (24th)	
Best Hip Hop Release	2019 (33rd)	
Best Soul/R&B Release	2019 (33rd)	
Best Artist	2021 (35th)	Originally named Best Male Artist and Best Female Artist (1987-2020)
Fine Arts Awards
Best Classical Album	1987 (1st)	Originally named Best Australian Classical Record (1987–1994) and Best Australian Classical Release (1995–1998)
Best Jazz Album	1987 (1st)	Originally named Best Australian Jazz Record (1987–1994) and Best Australian Jazz Release (1995–1998)
Best Original Soundtrack, Cast or Show Album	1987 (1st)	Originally named Best Australian Soundtrack/Cast/Show Record (1987–1994) and Best Australian Soundtrack/Cast/Show Release (1995–1998); between 1999 and 2003, separate awards were given for Best Original Soundtrack Album and Best Original Show/Cast Album. Since 2017 it was named Best Original Soundtrack or Musical Theatre Cast Album.
Best World Music Album	1995 (9th)	Originally named Best Folk/World/Traditional Release (1995–1998)
Artisan Awards
Best Cover Art	1987 (1st)	Originally named Best Australian Cover Artwork (1987–1998)
Engineer of the Year	1987 (1st)	Originally named Best Australian Engineer (1987–1998)
Producer of the Year	1987 (1st)	Originally named Best Australian Producer (1987–1998)
Public Voted Awards
Single of the Year/Song of the Year	1987 (1st)	Originally named Best Australian Single (1987–1998) and Record of the Year (1999-2001). Winners and nominees were determined by peer voting (in the general field) until 1998 when it was discontinued under the name Song of the Year (Songwriter). The accolade was re-introduced in 2012 as a public-voted category and was changed to Song of the Year. (Note: In 2016 Apple Music partnered with ARIA to sponsor the Song of the Year category: in order to vote the public could listen to their chosen song inside Apple Music or they could vote through ARIA's website in the regular way.)
Best Video	1987 (1st)	Originally named Best Australian Video (1987–1998); From 1987 to 2011, Best Video was a peer voted accolade in the artisan field. From 2012 onward, the winners are public-voted from ten nominees.
Best International Artist	2010 (24th)	Originally named Most Popular International Artist (2010–2011)
Best Australian Live Act	2011 (25th)	Originally named Most Popular Australian Live Artist (2011)
Music Teacher of the Year	2017 (31st)	

=== Retired ===
Category	First awarded	Last awarded	Notes
General Awards
Song of the Year (Songwriter)	1987 (1st)	1998 (12th)	It was named Australian Song of the Year (1987–1998) when the category was for song-writing until it was discontinued
Best Indigenous Release	1987 (1st)	1998 (12th)	Originally named Best Australian Indigenous Record (1987–1994) and Best Aboriginal/Islander Release (1995). Some nominated bands had no Indigenous Australian members
Best New Talent	1987 (1st)	1998 (12th)	Originally named Best Australian New Talent (1987–1998)
Highest-Selling Album	1987 (1st)	2011 (25th)	Originally named Highest Selling Australian Album (1987–1998). Not presented in 2010.
Highest-Selling Single	1987 (1st)	2011 (25th)	Originally named Highest Selling Australian Single (1987–1998). Not presented in 2010.
Breakthrough Artist – Album	1989 (3rd)	2011 (25th)	Originally named Best Australian Debut Album (1989–1998) and Best New Artist – Album (1999–2003). Not presented in 2010.
Breakthrough Artist – Single	1989 (3rd)	2011 (25th)	Originally named Best Australian Debut Single (1989–1998) and Best New Artist – Single (1999–2003). Not presented in 2010.
Best Adult Alternative Album	1994 (8th)	2016 (30th)	Originally named Best Australian Alternative Record (1994), Best Australian Alternative Release (1995–1998) and Best Alternative Release (1999–2001). After being discontinued during 2002–2009, the award was re-introduced as Best Adult Alternative Album in 2010. Award was discounted again during 2012–2015.
Best Urban Release	2004 (18th)	2018 (32nd)	Originally named Best Urban Release (2004-2009) changed to Best Urban Album (2010–2017), and then in 2018, it returned to original name as Best Urban Release, but after the retirement, it was split in two categories, Best Soul/R&B Release and Best Hip Hop Release.
Best Male Artist	1987 (1st)	2020 (34th)	Originally named Best Australian Male Artist (1987–1998), merged into Best Artist in 2021
Best Female Artist	1987 (1st)	2020 (34th)	Originally named Best Australian Female Artist (1987–1998), merged into Best Artist in 2021
Best Comedy Release	1987 (1st)	2020 (34th)	Originally named Best Australian Comedy Record (1987–1994) and Best Australian Comedy Release (1995–1998)
Fine Arts Awards
Best Music DVD	2004 (18th)	2011 (25th)	Originally held in the general ceremony from 2004 to 2010, in 2011, it was held early at the nominations event.
Public Voted Awards
Most Popular Australian Album	2010 (24th)	2010 (24th)	
Most Popular Australian Single	2010 (24th)	2010 (24th)	

- Note: Originally awarded at the same ceremony as the ARIA Awards, the ARIA Fine Arts and Artisan Awards have been awarded at a separate ceremony from 2004. In 2020 both Fine Arts and Artisan Awards returned to the general ceremony.

=== Hall of Fame and achievement awards ===
ARIA Hall of Fame inductees have been installed annually from the category's inception, as from 1988 except 2000 and 2021 (no inductees), ARIA Outstanding Achievement Awards (periodically, first in 1988), ARIA Special Achievement Awards (periodically, first awarded in 1989), ARIA Lifetime Achievement Awards (periodically, first awarded in 1991) and ARIA Icon Awards (first in 2013).

Originally artists were inducted into the Hall of Fame at the same ceremony as the ARIA Awards, in 2005 the inaugural ARIA Icons: Hall of Fame ceremony was held separately with another inductee at the later ARIA Awards ceremony — from 2008 to 2010 the ARIA Hall of Fame ceremony was a stand-alone event with no later inductees. From 2011 the Hall of Fame ceremony was held at the same time as the ARIA Awards.

== The trophy ==
The ARIA award trophy, used since 1990, is a tall triangular pyramid made of solid stainless steel. The 1987–1989 trophies were designed by Philip Mortlock, while the 1990 design was by Mark Denning. The Channel V award which is V-shaped, and silver, or in the case of the award of 2008, red. As from 2005, The Hall of Fame trophy, from the Denning design, was golden coloured metal with ARIA printed in black near the base on two sides, on the third side is the award title (ARIA ICONS: HALL OF FAME), awardee name and date printed on a plaque.

== ARIA Music Awards by year ==
To see the full article for a particular year, please click on the year link.

Year	Album of the Year	Single of the Year	Hall of Fame
1987	John Farnham; Whispering Jack	John Farnham "You're the Voice"	ARIA Hall of Fame not established
1988	Icehouse; Man of Colours	Midnight Oil "Beds Are Burning"	AC/DC; Col Joye; Dame Joan Sutherland; Johnny O'Keefe; Slim Dusty; Vanda & Young
1989	Crowded House; Temple of Low Men	The Church "Under the Milky Way"	Nellie Melba; Ross Wilson
1990	Ian Moss; Matchbook	Peter Blakeley "Crying in the Chapel"	Sherbet; Percy Grainger
1991	Midnight Oil; Blue Sky Mining	Absent Friends "(I Don't Want to Be With) Nobody But You"	Billy Thorpe; Don Burrows; Glenn Shorrock; Pete Dawson
1992	Baby Animals; Baby Animals	Yothu Yindi "Treaty" (Filthy Lucre Remix)	Skyhooks
1993	Diesel; Hepfidelity	Wendy Matthews "The Day You Went Away"	Peter Allen; Cold Chisel
1994	The Cruel Sea; The Honeymoon Is Over	The Cruel Sea "The Honeymoon Is Over"	Men at Work
1995	Tina Arena; Don't Ask	Silverchair "Tomorrow"	The Seekers
1996	You Am I Hourly, Daily	Nick Cave and Kylie Minogue "Where the Wild Roses Grow"	Australian Crawl; Horrie Dargie
1997	Savage Garden; Savage Garden	Savage Garden "Truly Madly Deeply"	Paul Kelly; Graeme Bell; Bee Gees
1998	Regurgitator; Unit	Natalie Imbruglia "Torn"	The Masters Apprentices; The Angels
1999	Powderfinger; Internationalist	Powderfinger "The Day You Come"	Jimmy Little; Richard Clapton
2000	Killing Heidi; Reflector	Madison Avenue "Don't Call Me Baby"	no inductees
2001	Powderfinger; Odyssey Number Five	Powderfinger "My Happiness"	The Saints; INXS
2002	Kasey Chambers; Barricades & Brickwalls	Kylie Minogue "Can't Get You Out of My Head"	Olivia Newton-John
2003	Powderfinger; Vulture Street	Delta Goodrem "Born to Try"	John Farnham
2004	Jet; Get Born	Jet "Are You Gonna Be My Girl"	Little River Band
2005	Missy Higgins; The Sound of White	Ben Lee "Catch My Disease"	Jimmy Barnes; Smoky Dawson; Renée Geyer; Normie Rowe; Split Enz; The Easybeats; Hunters and Collectors
2006	Bernard Fanning; Tea and Sympathy	Eskimo Joe "Black Fingernails, Red Wine"	Midnight Oil; Divinyls; Rose Tattoo; Helen Reddy; Daddy Cool; Icehouse; Lobby Loyde
2007	Silverchair; Young Modern	Silverchair "Straight Lines"	Frank Ifield; Hoodoo Gurus; Marcia Hines; Jo Jo Zep & The Falcons; Brian Cadd; Radio Birdman; Nick Cave
2008	The Presets; Apocalypso	Gabriella Cilmi "Sweet About Me"	Dragon; Russell Morris; Max Merritt; The Triffids; ~~Rolf Harris~~^{1}
2009	Empire of the Sun; Walking on a Dream	Empire of the Sun "Walking on a Dream"	Kev Carmody; The Dingoes; Little Pattie; Mental As Anything; John Paul Young
2010	Angus & Julia Stone; Down the Way	Angus & Julia Stone "Big Jet Plane"	The Church; The Loved Ones; Models; John Williamson; Johnny Young
2011	Boy & Bear; Moonfire	Gotye featuring Kimbra "Somebody That I Used to Know"	Kylie Minogue; The Wiggles
2012	Gotye; Making Mirrors	Matt Corby "Brother"	Yothu Yindi
2013	Tame Impala; Lonerism	Matt Corby "Resolution"	Air Supply
2014	Sia; 1000 Forms of Fear	5 Seconds of Summer "She Looks So Perfect"	Molly Meldrum; Countdown
2015	Tame Impala; Currents	Conrad Sewell "Start Again"	Tina Arena
2016	Flume; Skin	Troye Sivan "Youth"	Crowded House
2017	Gang of Youths; Go Farther in Lightness	Peking Duk (featuring Elliphant) "Stranger"	Daryl Braithwaite
2018	Amy Shark; Love Monster	5 Seconds of Summer "Youngblood"	Kasey Chambers
2019	Dean Lewis; A Place We Knew	Guy Sebastian "Choir"	Human Nature
2020	Tame Impala; The Slow Rush	5 Seconds of Summer "Teeth"	Archie Roach
2021	Genesis Owusu; Smiling with No Teeth	Spacey Jane "Booster Seat"	no inductees
2022	Baker Boy; Gela	Tones and I "Cloudy Day"	no inductees
2023	Genesis Owusu; Struggler	Troye Sivan "Rush"	Jet
2024	Troye Sivan; Something to Give Each Other	G Flip "The Worst Person Alive"	Missy Higgins
2025	Amyl and the Sniffers; Cartoon Darkness	The Kid Laroi "Girls"	You Am I
2026	Tame Impala; Deadbeat	Tame Impala "Dracula"	Gurrumul, Jenny Morris, Kate Ceberano, Spiderbait, The Living End, Vika and Linda

1 Rolf Harris was stripped of his induction in 2014 after being convicted for indecent assault.

== Most awards/nominations ==
Highest number of awards received by an artist with the number of their nominations: (up until 2026)

Artist	Wins	Nominations	References
John Farnham	22	65	
Tame Impala	22	41	
Silverchair	21	49	
Kylie Minogue	18	62	
Powderfinger	18	47	
The Wiggles	18	35	
Paul Kelly	17	65	
Kasey Chambers	15	34	
Crowded House	14	43	
Savage Garden	14	26	
Gotye	13	21	
Flume	12	33	
Missy Higgins	12	32	
Midnight Oil	11	38	
You Am I	11	33	
Geoffrey Gurrumul Yunupingu	11	23	
Hilltop Hoods	10	43	
Sia	10	33	
Troye Sivan	10	28	
Archie Roach	10	23	
Nick Cave	9	35	
Delta Goodrem	9	26	
Yothu Yindi	9	14	
Amy Shark	8	38	
Eskimo Joe	8	35	
Empire of the Sun	8	22	
Joseph Tawadros	8	21	
The Cruel Sea	8	19	
Natalie Imbruglia	8	14	
Jet	8	11	
Guy Sebastian	7	35	
John Butler	7	35	
The Living End	7	31	
Jimmy Barnes	7	27	
Genesis Owusu	7	27	
Regurgitator	7	23	
Wendy Matthews	7	22	
Tina Arena	7	20	
INXS	7	18	
Richard Tognetti	7	18	
Paul Grabowsky	7	17	
The Presets	7	17	
Sydney Symphony Orchestra	7	17	
Amyl and the Sniffers	7	16	
Courtney Barnett	6	24	
Tones & I	6	23	
Angus & Julia Stone	6	21	
Diesel	6	20	
Baker Boy	6	20	
The Teskey Brothers	6	17	
Troy Cassar-Daley	6	16	
5 Seconds of Summer	6	15	
Gabriella Cilmi	6	6	

== See also ==
- Music of Australia
