= Baby Animals (album) =

Studio album by Baby Animals
- Released: 2 September 1991
- Studio: Bearsville (Bearsville, New York)
- Genre: Rock
- Length: 44:37
- Label: Imago
- Producer: Mike Chapman

Baby Animals chronology
| Baby Animals (1991) | Shaved and Dangerous (1993) |

Singles from Baby Animals
- 1. "Early Warning" Released: 15 April 1991; 2. "Rush You" Released: 5 August 1991; 3. "Painless" Released: 7 October 1991; 4. "One Word" Released: January 1992; 5. "Ain't Gonna Get" Released: 6 April 1992

Professional ratings
Review scores
| Source | Rating |
|---|---|
| AllMusic | 3/5 stars |
| Kerrang! | 5/5 stars |

Baby Animals is the debut album by Australian band Baby Animals, released in September 1991. The album debuted at number six on the ARIA Albums Chart and spent six weeks at number one, eventually going eight times platinum and becoming the highest-selling debut Australian rock album until the release of Jet's Get Born album 12 years later. In October 2010, Baby Animals was listed in the book, 100 Best Australian Albums.

== Track listing ==
1. "Rush You" (Suze DeMarchi, Dave Leslie, Eddie Parise) – 4:11
2. "Early Warning" (DeMarchi, Leslie, Parise) – 3:57
3. "Painless" (DeMarchi, Parise) – 3:42
4. "Make It End" (DeMarchi, Steve Elson) – 4:09
5. "Big Time Friends" (DeMarchi, Parise, Frank Celenza) – 4:54
6. "Working for the Enemy" (DeMarchi, Leslie) – 4:32
7. "One Word" (DeMarchi, Elson) – 3:58
8. "Break My Heart" (DeMarchi, Parise) – 4:03
9. "Waste of Time" (DeMarchi, Leslie, Parise, Celenza) – 3:38
10. "One Too Many" (DeMarchi, Elson) – 5:08
11. "Ain't Gonna Get" (DeMarchi, Elson) – 2:58

== Personnel ==
Baby Animals

- Suze DeMarchi – guitar, vocals
- Dave Leslie – guitar
- Eddie Parise – bass
- Frank Celenza – drums

Technical personnel

- Mike Chapman – producer, mixing
- Kevin Shirley – engineer
- Rick O'Neil – mastering engineer
- Mario Vasquez – assistant engineer
- Rob Marinissen, Chrystene Carroll – photography

== Charts ==
=== Weekly charts ===
Weekly chart performance for Baby Animals
| Chart (1991–1992) | Peak position |
|---|---|
| Australian Albums (ARIA) | 1 |
| New Zealand Albums (RMNZ) | 21 |
| Swedish Albums (Sverigetopplistan) | 50 |
| UK Albums (Official Charts) | 70 |

=== Year-end charts ===
Year-end chart performance for Baby Animals
| Chart (1991) | Position |
|---|---|
| Australian Albums (ARIA) | 2 |
| Chart (1992) | Position |
| New Zealand (RIANZ) | 50 |

== Certifications ==
Certifications for Baby Animals
| Region | Certification | Certified units/sales |
|---|---|---|
| Australia (ARIA) | 4× Platinum | 280,000^{^} |
^{^} Shipments figures based on certification alone.
