= Baby Animals =

Australian hard rock band

- Also known as: Woody's Heroes
- Origin: Sydney, New South Wales, Australia
- Genre: Hard rock
- Years active: 1989–1996, 2007–present
- Labels: Imago/BMG; Social Family Records
- Members: Suze DeMarchi; Dave Leslie; Dario Bortolin; Ricki Rae
- Past members: Frank Celenza; Eddie Parise; Matt Cornell; Mick Skelton
- Website: thebabyanimals.com

The Baby Animals are an Australian hard rock band active from October 1989 to 1996 and reformed in 2007. The original line-up was Frank Celenza on drums, Suze DeMarchi on lead vocals and guitar, Dave Leslie on guitar and backing vocals, and Eddie Parise on bass guitar and backing vocals. They recorded two studio albums, Baby Animals (September 1991) – which peaked at No. 1 on the ARIA Albums Chart, and Shaved and Dangerous (August 1993) – which reached No. 2. At the ARIA Music Awards of 1992 the group won three trophies: Album of the Year and Breakthrough Artist – Album for Baby Animals and Breakthrough - Single for "Early Warning". Baby Animals was listed in the 100 Best Australian Albums (October 2010). The reunited line-up are DeMarchi, Leslie, Dario Bortolin on bass guitar and Mick Skelton on drums and percussion. Their fourth studio album, This Is Not the End, was issued in May 2013, which reached the top 20.

== Biography ==
=== Early history: 1989–1990 ===
The Baby Animals were formed in Sydney in October 1989 by Frank Celenza on drums (ex-Boys, Bamboo Curtain, DD and the Rockmen); Suze DeMarchi on lead vocals and guitar (ex-Photoplay, the Kind, DD and the Rockmen), Dave Leslie on guitar and backing vocals (ex-Swingshift); and Eddie Parise on bass guitar and backing vocals (ex-Boys, Bel Aires, Bamboo Curtain). De Marchi, from Perth, had previously recorded three solo singles with EMI in the United Kingdom.

Upon her return to Perth in July DeMarchi contacted former bandmate Celenza to form a new band in Sydney. He was initially reluctant to go but recommended another former bandmate, Parise. In Sydney, DeMarchi approached her then-manager, John Woodruff (The Angels, Diesel [ex-the Kind, with DeMarchi]), who signed the new group and referred Leslie to her. Celenza then officially joined. Woodruff later recalled "I'd seen [DeMarchi] in London performing some bad Stock Aitken and Waterman tunes on television late one night. I found her and she turned out to be Australian. She also turned out to have a lot of attitude. I brought her back to Australia and put a band together around her."

The band's first performance was in November 1989 at the Kardomah Café in Sydney, where they were billed as Woody's Heroes, then they worked the city's pub and club circuit. According to Kerrang! magazine's writer, Celenza provided the new name, Baby Animals, after seeing an ad for a local TV show, Wheel of Fortune, hosted by "Baby" John Burgess. Another version suggests the name came from a calendar in a mall. In a New Zealand magazine, RTR Sounz, DeMarchi indicated that they changed the story of the name's origins in different interviews as they were bored with that question.

Baby Animals were assisted by the Angels including one of their demos, "Break My Heart", on the B-side of the established band's single, "Dogs Are Talking" (April 1990). "Break My Heart" was co-written by DeMarchi and Parise. The single also included a track each, from two other new rock and roll bands – the Desert Cats and the Hurricanes – a national tour by the Angels followed with all three new bands supporting.

In August 1990 Baby Animals signed a publishing deal with SBK Songs (later EMI Music Publishing). After attending a gig, Terry Ellis, president of newly formed Imago Recording Company, signed them to his label, funded by BMG. Ellis described the performance, "the band was great, the songs were terrific and to me Suze clearly had that indefineable magic that separates one artist from the crowd and makes them a star."

=== Debut album: 1991–1992 ===
The band flew to New York to record their debut eponymous album, Baby Animals, at Bearsville Studios, Woodstock and Second City Studio, Long Island with ex-pat Australian Mike Chapman producing. DeMarchi said of the production process: "He very rigidly made us pull things back and just concentrate on the essence of the song rather than being fancy. Mike was the taskmaster – 'Let me hear the hooks'. Like Early Warning - that tag at the beginning 'too young to know too old to listen' - Mike said 'I'm going to take that part of the chorus, let's put that at the front; that's the hook'."

Woodruff had organised for his band to work with Chapman and Kevin "Caveman" Shirley (audio engineer): "I had never met [Chapman], I knew his work. I'd listened to everything he'd ever done... I thought 'if we can drag him out of retirement to get the song structure right'... Susie was writing great songs and great sentiments, but the structure wasn't quite there. I thought if I can then convince him to work with a young rude engineer, which turned out to be [Shirley], and you couldn't get much younger or ruder than that, then I'm going to end up with a record that has an edge to it, that has some tone to it, that has some rock and roll and that has some feel to it that's as edgy as she is but with great songs."

Their debut single, Early Warning (April 1991), reached the Top 30 on the ARIA Singles Chart. The track was written by DeMarchi, Parise and Leslie. After the release of the single, the band flew to the United States for a series of showcases for the Imago/BMG people, to coincide with the earlier release of the album there. Their second single, "Rush You", was issued in August, which also reached the Top 30.

Baby Animals was released in September 1991, which debuted at No 6 on the ARIA Albums Charts. In the following February–March it spent six weeks at No 1. It spent a total of 46 weeks in the top 50 and was certified four times platinum by ARIA for shipment of over 280,000 units. It remained the highest-selling debut Australian rock album until the release of Jet's effort, Get Born (September 2003) – twelve years later. Baby Animals also appeared in the top 30 on the Official New Zealand Music Chart and top 50 on the Swedish Albums Chart. Australian musicologist Ian McFarlane felt it "showcased the band's confident and melodic brand of hard rock and, in particular, highlighted DeMarchi's provocative vocal growl."

After listening to the album, Bryan Adams asked them to join his European tour. Whilst overseas, in November 1991, they won the Best New Act category at the inaugural Australian Music Awards. By Christmas that year the band were back in Australia for more national touring, and the release of two more singles, "Painless" (November) and "One Word" (February 1992); the latter peaked at No. 15 on the ARIA Singles Chart – their highest position. Baby Animals' Let Go of My Ears Tour had them playing to sell out crowds.

In 1992 the band joined Black Crowes on tours of Australia and New Zealand. In the US they appeared on Late Night with David Letterman and performed "Painless". At the ARIA Music Awards of 1992 they won trophies for Album of the Year and Breakthrough Artist – Album for Baby Animals and Breakthrough Artist – Single for "Early Warning". The band then toured as a support act for Van Halen's For Unlawful Carnal Knowledge Tour across the US from 28 January to 31 May, playing to arena-size audiences. Eddie Van Halen requested their presence after his wife Valerie had heard their album, and suggested them. Australian Rolling Stone placed DeMarchi on the cover. It was the first time they had put an Australian artist or group on the cover on the merits of a debut album. The band had played over 500 shows when they ended that tour in August 1992.

In November 1992, Baby Animals released a new single, titled "Impossible to Fly". It peaked at No. 48 on the ARIA Singles Chart.

=== Shaved and Dangerous and disbandment: 1993–1996 ===
In 1993 Baby Animals returned to Bearsville Studios, to start work on their second album, Shaved and Dangerous (August 1993), with two weeks of pre-production. They went to the Bahamas and spent two months recording at Compass Point Studios with Ed Stasium producing (Ramones, Living Colour, Hoodoo Gurus). Next, they travelled to Los Angeles, where they worked with Nuno Bettencourt (of Extreme); he provided song writing and guitar on "Because I Can" and produced "Life From a Distance" and "Be My Friend".

McFarlane described the album as "a more adventurous progressive rock album. It had less of a commercial feel, and Leslie layered the songs with snaking guitar solos." Daniel Gioffre of AllMusic felt that "For the most part, the songwriting here is topnotch, with most of the songs showcasing fairly sophisticated harmonic and rhythmic ideas. Despite the proggy nature of some of the compositions, the mix is total pop, with DeMarchi way up front. However, this is a good thing, as she has a very strong, if sometimes overemotive, singing voice." The album peaked at No. 2 in Australia. Bettencourt also contributed to "She Does Whatever" on the Shaved and Dangerous Tour CD. At the ARIA Music Awards of 1993 the group received two nominations for "One Word": Single of the Year and Best Group.

During mid-1993 Baby Animals supported Robert Plant's US tour, before returning to Australia late in the year to prepare for a 27-date Australian tour. The tour was cut short when DeMarchi experienced throat problems, vocal fold nodules, which required her to undertake surgery on her vocal cords. At the ARIA Music Awards of 1994 they received another nomination for Best Group – this time for Shaved and Dangerous.

In August 1994 Baby Animals shared the stage with Extreme in a concert on the Azores island of São Miguel. In that month DeMarchi and Bettencourt married and the couple moved to Boston. Song writing and recording for a proposed third album was anticipated for November. In 1995 on the verge of their first major US tour, US-based Imago Records folded after losing support from BMG. In early 1996 Baby Animals officially disbanded as the band members undertook separate projects.

=== Reformed and new albums: 2007–2017 ===
Baby Animals reformed in 2007 in the US with all four original members: Celenza, DeMarchi, Leslie and Parise. They released an acoustic CD of their previous hits, Il Grande Silenzio, on 19 January 2008, as part of the Liberation Blue Acoustic Series. The band appeared live on Australian breakfast TV program, Sunrise, three days later, and confirmed local tour dates for that year. In the following January they announced another national tour throughout that year, which was subsequently sold out.

Early in 2009 internal conflicts become apparent, Celenza and Parise eventually left. In April that year Demarchi and Leslie continued the group with Matt Cornell on bass guitar and vocals, and Mick Skelton in drums. Cornell was later replaced by Dario Bortolin.

In April 2013 the Baby Animals line-up of Bortolin, Demarchi, Leslie and Skelton released their first new single in 20 years, "Email". It was followed by the release of a new album, This Is Not the End, in late May. This was the first album released by new label Social Family Records, which peaked at No. 19.

In May 2016 the Baby Animals re-released Baby Animals as Baby Animals 25th Anniversary (or BA25), to celebrate 25 years since the original release of their debut. This expanded version includes live songs, unreleased tracks, B-sides and pre-studio demos. Also in that month they provided two gigs with the original line-up performing the debut album in full and the new line-up playing tracks from This Is Not the End. Baby Animals performed a national headline tour with The Screaming Jets in June and July 2017. A live album was released in November 2017.

=== Greatest Hits: 2018–present ===
In February 2018, Baby Animals released "Tonight" which lead singer Suze DeMarchi wrote after her father died suddenly. In January 2019, the band announced their first greatest hits would be released in February 2019. The album will include three new recordings including a cover of Linda Ronstadt's "How Do I Make You". From November 2019, The Baby Animals co-headlined the "They Who Rock 2019" tour with The Angels. To promote the tour, The Angels released a cover of The Baby Animals' "One Word" and the Baby Animals covered The Angels' "Marseilles", both released on 1 October 2019. In 2020 the Baby Animals were part of the Red Hot Summer Tour series of outdoor shows around Australia, alongside Boom Crash Opera, Killing Heidi, The Angels, The Living End, James Reyne and headliner, Hunters and Collectors.

== Members ==
Current members

- Suze DeMarchi – lead vocals, guitar (1989–1996, 2007–present)
- Dave Leslie – guitars (1989–1996, 2007–present)
- Dario Bortolin – bass guitar, backing vocals (2011–present)
- Ricki Rae – drums, percussion (2024–present)

Former members

- Frank Celenza – drums, percussion (1989–1996, 2007–2009, 2016)
- Eddie Parise – bass guitar (1989–1996, 2007–2009, 2016)
- Matt Cornell – bass guitar, backing vocals (2009–2010)
- Mick Skelton – drums, percussion (2009–2024)

Timeline

== Discography ==
=== Studio albums ===
List of studio albums, with selected chart positions and certifications
Title	Album details	Peak chart positions				Certifications
Title	Album details	AUS	NZ	SWE	UK	Certifications
Baby Animals	Released: 2 September 1991; Label: Imago (72787-21002); Formats: CD	1	21	50	70	ARIA: 8× Platinum
Shaved and Dangerous	Released: 30 August 1993; Label: Imago (74321-16262); Formats: CD	2	—	—	—	ARIA: Gold
Il Grande Silenzio	Released: 21 January 2008; Label: Liberation Blue (BLUE 152.2); Formats: CD, digital download	78	—	—	—	
This Is Not the End	Released: 31 May 2013; Label: Social Family (SFR0002); Formats: CD, digital download	19	—	—	—	

=== Re-issues ===
List of re-issues, with selected chart positions
Title	Album details	Peak chart positions
Title	Album details	AUS
BA25	Released: 20 May 2016; Label: Liberation (LMCD0288); Formats: CD, digital download, streaming	73

=== Live albums ===
List of live albums
Title	Details
Baby Animals Live	Released: 21 November 2017; Label: Bloodlines; Format: Digital download

=== Compilation albums ===
List of compilation albums
Title	Details
Greatest Hits	Released: 15 February 2019; Label: Bloodlines; Format: Digital download

=== Extended plays ===
List of extended plays
Title	Details
The Essential Five	Released: 16 February 2018; Label: Bloodlines; Format: Digital download

=== Singles ===
List of singles, with selected chart positions and certifications
Title	Year	Peak chart positions			Album
Title	Year	AUS	NZ	US Rock	Album
"Early Warning"	1991	21	—	—	Baby Animals
"Rush You"	1991	30	—	—	Baby Animals
"Painless"	1991	49	31	29	Baby Animals
"One Word"	1992	15	—	46	Baby Animals
"Ain't Gonna Get"	1992	65	50	—	Baby Animals
"Impossible to Fly"	1992	48	—	—	non-album single
"Don't Tell Me What to Do"	1993	24	—	—	Shaved and Dangerous
"At the End of the Day / Backbone"	1993	60	—	—	Shaved and Dangerous
"Lights Out at Eleven"	1994	54	—	—	Shaved and Dangerous
"Email"	2013	—	—	—	This Is Not the End
"Stitch"	2013	—	—	—	This Is Not the End
"Tonight"	2018	—	—	—	Greatest Hits
"How Do I Make You"	2019	—	—	—	Greatest Hits
"Marseilles"	2019	—	—	—	non-album single
"Ace of Spades" (with Chris Cheney)	2025	—	—	—	non-album single

== Awards and nominations ==
=== APRA Awards ===
The APRA Awards are presented annually from 1982 by the Australasian Performing Right Association (APRA), "honouring composers and songwriters".

Year	Nominee / work	Award	Result	Ref.
2019	"Tonight" (Suze DeMarchi / Dave Leslie)	Urban Work of the Year	Shortlisted	

=== ARIA Music Awards ===
The ARIA Music Awards is an annual awards ceremony that recognises excellence, innovation, and achievement across all genres of Australian music. They commenced in 1987. Baby Animals have won three awards.

Year	Nominee / work	Award	Result	Ref.
1992	Baby Animals	Album of the Year	Won	
1992	Baby Animals	Best Group	Nominated	
1992	Baby Animals	Breakthrough Artist - Album	Won	
1992	"Early Warning"	Single of the Year	Nominated	
1992	"Early Warning"	Song of the Year	Nominated	
1992	"Early Warning"	Breakthrough Artist - Single	Won	
1993	"One Word"	Best Group	Nominated	
1993	"One Word"	Single of the Year	Nominated	
1993	"One Word"	Song of the Year	Nominated	
1994	Shaved and Dangerous	Best Group	Nominated	

== Notes ==
Taken from the book Baby Animals Guitar Tablature, Published by EMI
