= Suze DeMarchi =

Australian singer-songwriter

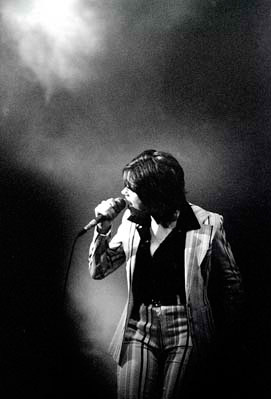
- DeMarchi in 1991

Background information
- Born: 14 February 1964 (age 62); Perth, Western Australia, Australia
- Genres: Hard rock, rock, pop
- Occupations: Singer-songwriter
- Instruments: Vocals, guitar
- Years active: 1980–present
- Labels: Mushroom Records, Social Family Records
- Spouse: Nuno Bettencourt (m. 1994; div. 2013)

Suze DeMarchi (born 14 February 1964) is an Australian singer-songwriter, best known for fronting the band Baby Animals (1989–1996, 2007–present).

== Early life ==
DeMarchi was born on 14 February 1964 in Perth, Western Australia, to Walter, a panel beater, and Shirley DeMarchi, a singer, and has three older siblings; her sister Denise is also a singer. She grew up in Karrinyup, where she attended Newman College. DeMarchi began her singing career in the early 1980s when she was 17, playing in local band Photoplay, with Mark Lizotte, and subsequently local cover band, the Kind.

Her paternal grandfather was Italian. She also has French, German and Irish heritage and holds an Irish passport.

== Career ==
=== Early years and Baby Animals ===
In 1985, she moved to London, England, where she was signed to EMI and had a fairly successful solo career in pop music, where she released a number of singles: "Young Hearts", "Big Wednesday" and "Dry Your Eyes".

Disheartened by the record company's attempt to slide her into a pop career, along with missing working with a band, she returned to Australia in mid-1989, where she and fellow Perth musicians Frank Celenza, Eddie Parise and Dave Leslie formed the band Baby Animals. The band met with success in their native Australia, releasing two albums, touring with Van Halen, and winning various awards before permanently disbanding in 1996. This was mostly due to legal battles with their record label Imago and Suze having nodules in her throat – she even had to stop singing for a short while because of them – in 1993, which forced the band to cut short the tour for their second album.

In 1994, DeMarchi collaborated with her husband Nuno Bettencourt on the song "God Took a Picture", which appeared in the film Highlander III: The Sorcerer.

=== Solo career: 1996–2007 ===
After the demise of Baby Animals in 1996, DeMarchi pursued a solo career. Although living in Boston with her husband and young daughter (apparently temporarily in her mother-in-law's basement at one point), she signed to Mushroom Records Australia and released 1999's Telelove, produced by Bettencourt, and the single "Satellite". DeMarchi supported the album with a May tour around Australia as the singles "Karma" and eventually "Open Windows" hit the shelves. DeMarchi was also nominated for an ARIA Award for Best Female Artist.

In 2001, it was rumoured that DeMarchi would be joining INXS as their new front person to replace Michael Hutchence, who died in 1997, following her performance with them at a concert in December 2000 where she sang "Shine Like It Does", "Never Tear Us Apart", and dueted with Jon Stevens (frequent replacement frontman for INXS, and formerly of the band Noiseworks) for "Good Times" and "Don't Change".

In June 2004, DeMarchi was recognised by the West Australian Music Industry Association and inducted as one of the inaugural inductees into the WAM Hall of Fame. In 2007, DeMarchi collaborated again with Bettencourt on several songs for the soundtrack of the motion picture Smart People, on which Bettencourt was credited for the musical score.

=== Baby Animals reunion: 2007–present ===
In 2007, Baby Animals reunited and released a third studio album. In 2015, DeMarchi released her second studio album Home, which debuted at number 26.

== Personal life ==
In the late 1980s, DeMarchi dated Gavin Rossdale, lead singer and guitarist for the band Bush. Bush's songs "Comedown" and "Glycerine" from 1994's Sixteen Stone are about their relationship.

In 1993, DeMarchi met Nuno Bettencourt, guitarist at that time for hard rock band Extreme. They co-wrote and performed the song "Because I Can" for Baby Animals' second record Shaved and Dangerous. On 27 August 1994, the couple married in the Azores, where Bettencourt's family is from. In 1996, they had their first child, a daughter Bebe Bettencourt. In 2002, DeMarchi and Bettencourt had their second child, a son, in Los Angeles. The couple separated in 2009 and announced their divorce in 2013.

== Discography ==
=== Albums ===
List of studio album, with selected chart positions
Title	Album details	Peak chart positions
Title	Album details	AUS
Telelove	Released: 17 March 1999; Label: Mushroom Records (MUSH33205.2); Formats: Compact Disc	40
Home	Released: 24 July 2015; Label: Social Family Records (SFR0033); Formats: CD, digital download,	26

=== Singles ===
List of lead singles, with selected chart positions
Title	Year	Peak chart positions	Albums
Title	Year	AUS	Albums
"Young Hearts"	1986	—	non-album single
"Big Wednesday"	1987	—	non-album single
"Dry Your Eyes"	1988	—	non-album single
"Satellite"	1998	59	Telelove
"Karma"	1998	204	Telelove
"Open Windows"	1999	—	Telelove

==== Charity singles ====
List of charity singles
Title	Year	Peak chart positions	Notes
Title	Year	AUS	Notes
"I Touch Myself" (as part of the I Touch Myself Project)	2014	72	The I Touch Myself Project launched in 2014 with a mission to encourage young women to touch themselves regularly to find early signs of cancer.

== Awards ==
=== APRA Awards ===
The APRA Awards are presented annually from 1982 by the Australasian Performing Right Association (APRA), "honouring composers and songwriters".

Year	Nominee / work	Award	Result	Ref.
2019	"Tonight" by Baby Animals (Suze DeMarchi / Dave Leslie)	Song of the Year	Shortlisted	

=== West Australian Music Industry Awards ===
The West Australian Music Industry Awards are annual awards celebrating achievements for Western Australian music. They commenced in 1985.

Year	Nominee / work	Award	Result
1994	Suze DeMarchi	Rock 'n' Roll of Renown	inductee
