= Gerry Hale =

- Born: Gerald Richard Hale; 1959 (age 66–67); Newmarket, Suffolk, England
- Genres: Bluegrass
- Occupations: Musician, producer, actor, comedian
- Instruments: Violin, mandolin
- Years active: 1975–present

Gerald Richard "Gerry" Hale (born 1959, Newmarket, Suffolk) is an English-born, Australian-based multi-instrumentalist and vocalist. He has worked as a session musician for the Soft Boys (1978–80) and was a band member of Bouncing Czecks (fl. 1984) before relocating to Australia in 1987. He has provided violin and mandolin for Colin Hay Band (1988–90, 1994, 1998) and Broderick Smith Band (1990, 1994, 1996). Hale formed a bluegrass group, Uncle Bill, in 1996 which has had a variable line up. The group worked with Paul Kelly and together they released an album, Smoke (October 1999), which peaked at No. 36 on the ARIA Albums Chart. On that album, Hale provided guitar, mandolin, fiddle, dobro, lap steel, vocals and he co-produced it with Kelly.

== Biography ==
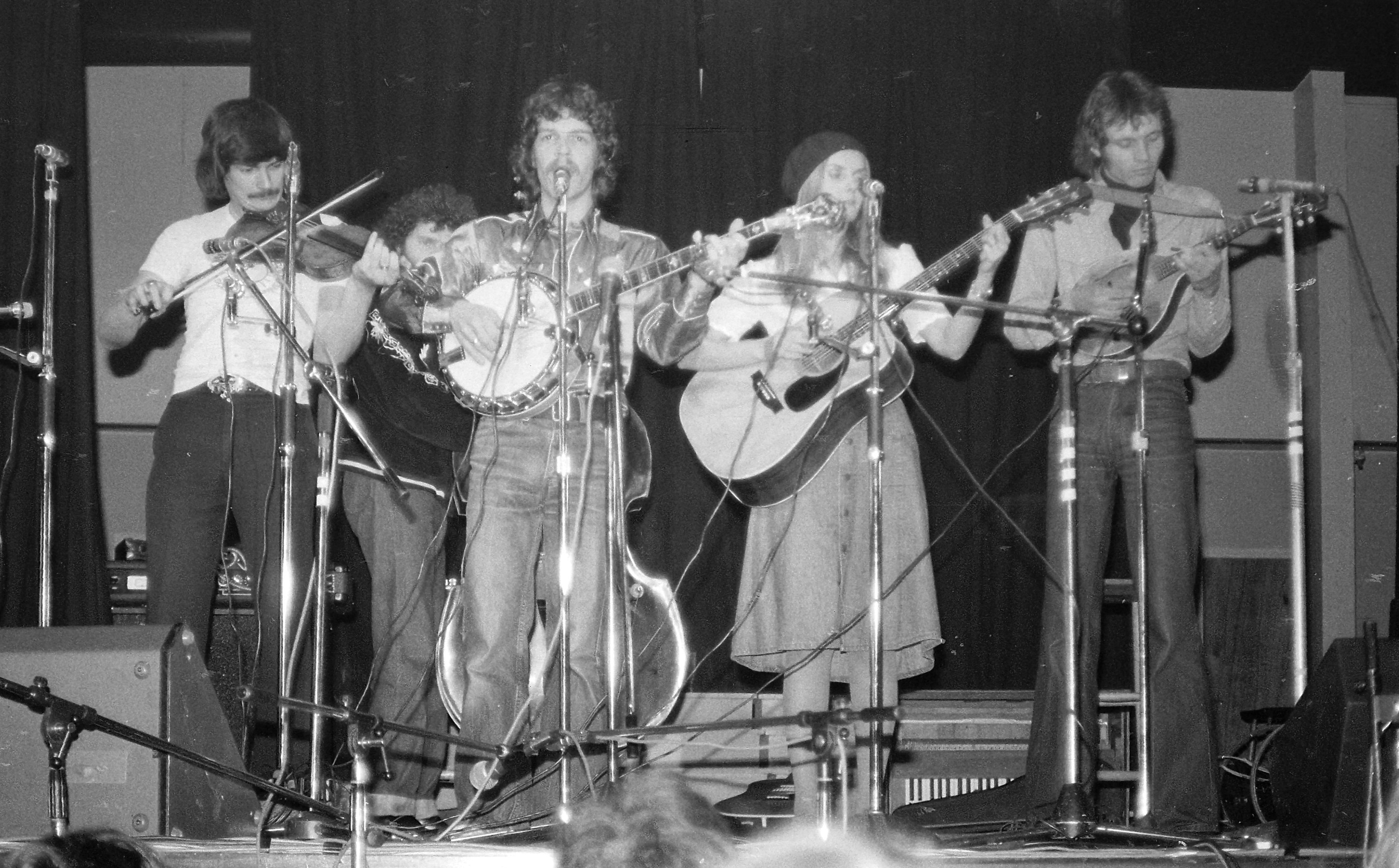
Hale (at left) performing with Telephone Bill and the Smooth Operators, 1977

Gerry Hale grew up in Newmarket, Suffolk and started playing music at the age of twelve, he turned professional at fifteen, spending three years touring rural England. He performed with American bluegrass pioneer, Bill Monroe, in 1975, at age sixteen. Hale worked in Cambridge from the mid-1970s, where he was a founding member of Telephone Bill and the Smooth Operators in 1975 on vocals, mandolin and fiddle, with Robb Appleton on vocals and harmonica, Anne Baker on vocals, acoustic guitar, mandolin, bass and percussion, Nick Barraclough on vocals, banjo, mandolin, guitar and bass, and Chris Cox on vocals, mandolin, banjo and double bass. Their first gig, in October, was at Mumford Theatre, Cambridge. He left the group after they had issued their first two albums, Pretty Slick, Huh? (1979) and Lounge Music (1980).

Hale was also a member of High and Lonesome. He was a session musician, providing violin, for Cambridge band, the Soft Boys, on their first two albums, A Can of Bees (1979) and Underwater Moonlight (June 1980).

In 1982 the Bouncing Czecks were formed in London as a cabaret, comedy group by Brian Bowles on lead guitar and Ricky Piper on lead vocals. They were joined, in 1984, by Hale on fiddle, Richard Lee on double bass (also ex-Telephone Bill and the Smooth Operators), and Australian-born Warren Wills on piano. The ensemble performed at the 1985 Edinburgh Festival and then toured Australia in October. Hale relocated to Melbourne. In October 1987 he competed at the second annual Tulip Time Bluegrass festival in Mittagong, where he won first prize in fiddle and in mandolin. One of the judges, Tim O'Brien (of US bluegrass group, Hot Rize) opined, "The musicians here seem to be developing real fast. There are a few really good players, and some that are coming along."

From December 1987 to January 1988, he was a musician, composer and musical arranger for a stage presentation of The Three Musketeers at Melbourne's Playhouse Theatre. From March to April he worked on a stage comedy, Tristram Shandy – Gent, at the Russell Street Theatre. In March 1988 he joined the Colin Hay Band on mandolin, violin and backing vocals alongside Hay on lead vocals and guitar (ex-Men at Work), Robert Dillon on drums and percussion (ex-Mike Rudd and the Heaters, Broderick Smith Band), Paul Gadsby on bass guitar and backing vocals (ex-Paul Kelly and the Dots, Broderick Smith Band) and Bryce Philby on lead guitar. Also in that year he provided banjo for the Black Sorrows' fifth studio album, Hold On to Me (September 1988).

Hale, on fiddle and mandolin, joined a bluegrass band, Rank Strangers, in 1988 with Philomena Carroll on vocals and bass guitar, Gary Forrester (a.k.a. Eddie Rambeaux) on vocals and guitar, Andrew Hook on mandolin and Peter Somerville on vocals and banjo. Rank Strangers won Best Group, Best Male Vocalist, and Best Composition for their album, Dust on the Bible, at the Australian Gospel Music Awards in Tamworth, New South Wales. In December 1988 Mike Jackson of The Canberra Times described their album, Uluru, which "features some delightful lead breaks on mandolin [Hook], banjo [Somerville] and fiddle (Gentleman Gerry Hale) and some rock-solid accompaniment from guitarist [Rambeaux] and bass player [Carroll]. [It] is worth buying for the fiddle playing alone. Hale shows great technique and a flair for appropriate harmony lines while matching the punch of the mandolin and banjo well."

Hale appears on Hay's second solo album, Wayfaring Sons (April 1990), after which Hay relocated to the United States. Hale then joined Broderick Smith Band on violin and mandolin during 1990. Also in April of that year he provided electric guitar, acoustic guitar and fiddle for Archie Roach's debut solo album, Charcoal Lane (1990), which was co-produced by Paul Kelly and Steve Connolly.

Hale returned to working with the Bouncing Czechs, from April to May 1991 at the Last Laugh Theatre Restaurant, in Collingwood. He was a comedian, singer, musician and divisor alongside fellow members of that ensemble: Gadsby, Piper and Adam Gare, to provide The Bouncing Czecks Are Greedy. From July to August 1992 he acted in, and was musical director for, King of Country, at the CUB Malthouse. He took an acting role in the Glenn Elston-directed version of Shakespeare's Twelfth Night from December to March 1993 at the Royal Botanic Gardens, Melbourne. Hale was recorded on Smith's album, My Shiralee (1994), playing autoharp, mandolin, acoustic guitar, violin and banjo. Hay had returned to Australia and Hale provided fiddle and mandolin for that artist's fourth album, Topanga (December 1994).

Hale formed another bluegrass group, Uncle Bill, in Melbourne, in 1996: their first gig was at the Terminus Hotel, Abbotsford. In 1997 Uncle Bill contributed two tracks for a various artists' compilation album, Where Joy Kills Sorrow, via the W. Minc label: "The World's Got Everything in It" and their collaboration with Kelly, "Thanks a Lot". Hale provided another track, "Roll It", on the limited edition's bonus disc. In August 1998 Uncle Bill released their debut album, Special Treatment, a set of cover versions of tracks by Australian songwriters, which was recorded at Red Heeler Studios, Preston. The title track, "40 Miles to Saturday Night" and "Maybe this Time for Sure" were originals by Kelly; "Don't Drink the Water" and "Overkill" were written by Hay; and "Stella Joy" was co-written by Smith and Randy Bulpin.

Uncle Bill and Kelly collaborated again in 1998 for the Slim Dusty tribute album, Not So Dusty, covering "The Sunlander". At the ARIA Music Awards of 1999 Not So Dusty was nominated for Best Country Album. Late in that year Uncle Bill released their second album, One Day at Adelphia...; its seventeen tracks were recorded live-in-the-studio at Adelphia Studio, Fitzroy, on 10 November of that year.

By 1999, the line up of Uncle Bill was Hale on guitar, mandolin, fiddle, dobro, lap steel and vocals, Gare on fiddle, mandolin and vocals, Somerville on banjo and vocals and Stuart Speed on double bass. They teamed with Kelly, again, for a bluegrass album, Smoke (October 1999), co-produced by Hale and Kelly, it appeared on the latter's own label Gawdaggie via EMI. Hale and Kelly co-wrote a track, "Night After Night". The album peaked at No. 36 on the ARIA Albums Chart. At the 2000 Victorian Country Music Awards Smoke won three awards, Best Group (Open), Best Group (Victorian) and Album of the Year. In December that year Uncle Bill released their third album, Heartbreak Train, which was recorded between July and November 2000 at Red Heeler Studio, Preston.

In early 2001, Hale disbanded Uncle Bill, and went on to appear on Deborah Conway's covers album of Patsy Cline's songs, PC: The Songs of Patsy Cline, which was released in August 2001. Hale joined her backing band, Deborah Conway and the Patsy Clones which toured Australia to promote the album. In the same year Hale co-composed the soundtrack for the feature film Silent Partner with Kelly. In 2003 Hale toured with Conway, again, promoting her compilation album, Only the Bones and he co-composed the soundtrack for the film Ned, with Willy Zygier – Conway's domestic and musical partner. Hale also performed and co-produced a number of tracks on Conway and Zygier's 2004 album, Summertown.

Hale on mandolin and guitar formed a new band, Gerry Hale's Innocent Bystanders, with Shane Ryall (guitar), Nigel MacLean (violin), Kimberly Wheeler (vocals/double bass) and Amelia Barden (vocals/percussion), their first performance was at the Czech Club in North Melbourne on 29 October 2004. In April 2006 they released, Vivando, a seventeen song tribute album to Dan Hicks. In 2009 Hale (guitar) re-formed Uncle Bill with Kim Wheeler (bass), John Gray (banjo), John Kendall (fiddle, mandolin), Kat Mear (vocals) and Pepita Emmerichs. In May 2012 they released an EP, Blue Mule.
