= The Sugarplastic =

- Origin: Los Angeles, California, U.S.
- Genres: Alternative rock, power pop, indie rock
- Years active: 1989–present
- Labels: DGC Records, Geffen, TallBoy Records
- Members: Ben Eshbach; Kiara Geller; David Cunningham
- Past members: Josh Laner

The Sugarplastic is an American alternative rock band founded in Los Angeles, California, in 1989.

== History ==
Founding members Ben Eshbach and Kiara Geller met in the late 1980s. Geller, who was still learning to play bass at the time, was impressed by Eshbach's guitar playing and encouraged him to form a band. The two bonded over similar tastes in music and began jamming informally with drummer Josh Laner in December 1989. The trio rehearsed in a local appliance store owned by Laner's father and went through a multitude of names before finally settling on The Sugarplastic. After failing to find a suitable lead singer, the band played only instrumentals for its first year of existence until Eshbach stepped up to sing. In 1991, the band recorded a demo tape and began performing live around Los Angeles. Shortly thereafter, the band gained attention and was asked by Pronto Records to release an EP of original material. "Ottawa Bonesaw", a collection of six singles, was released in 1993, followed by two more singles released by indie label Small-Fi.

The band entered the studio along with engineer Casey Neiditch to begin recording their debut album, Radio Jejune. During the sessions, they were approached by Geffen Records and agreed to sign on the condition that "Radio Jejune" be released by their current label, Sugarfix Records. Their major-label debut, "Bang, the Earth is Round" followed in 1996 and was produced by Ben Eshbach. The single "Polly Brown" was sent to radio, though it garnered little airplay. For their next album, the band chose to work with producer Andy Metcalfe, formerly of Squeeze and The Soft Boys. The sessions were drawn out by the departure of drummer Josh Laner and a contract renegotiation that allowed the band to be released from Geffen. Furthermore, the band wished to take their time in assembling a coherent collection of songs as their first two albums had only compiled material written at different times. Pat Mastelotto provided drums and percussion on two early tracks. David Cunningham, a long-time friend of Eshbach's, soon replaced Laner on drums as a full-time member. The band's third album, Resin, was finally released in 2000. The song "Don't Look Down" was recorded for The Powerpuff Girls in 2001.

For their fourth album, the band chose to release an A-side/B-side single every three months for a two-year period, culminating in "7x7x7", an album collection containing all seven singles. Their fifth and latest album, "Will", was released in 2005. The title is dedicated to William Glenn, a former engineer and friend of the band who died four years prior.

== Discography ==
=== Studio albums ===
- Radio Jejune (1995)
- Bang, the Earth is Round (1996)
- Resin (2000)
- Will (2003)

=== Compilations ===
- Primitive Plastic (Demos and B-Sides) (2001)
- 7x7x7 (2003)

=== EPs and singles ===
- "Ottawa Bonesaw" (EP) (1993)
- "Sheep/Superball" (single) (1993)
- "The Sugarplastic" (single) (1994)
- "Polly Brown" (single) (1996)
- "Montebello" / "Polly Brown" (single) (1996)
