= My Third Husband =

Studio album by Deborah Conway
- Released: October 1997
- Recorded: RAK, Red Bus and West Heath, London
- Genre: Rock; alternative rock
- Label: Mushroom Records
- Producer: Dave Anderson

Deborah Conway chronology
Epic Theatre (1994)	My Third Husband (1997)	Exquisite Stereo (2000)

Singles from My Third Husband
- 1. "Only the Bones (Will Show)" Released: September 1997; 2. "2001 Ultrasound" Released: January 1998; 3. "It’s a Girl Thing" Released: 1998

"My Third Husband" is the third studio album by Australia rock singer-songwriter and guitarist, Deborah Conway. The album was released in October 1997 and peaked at number 79 on the Australian ARIA Charts. It was the final release of Conway's on the Mushroom Records label. Conway described the album as a "dark, throbbing, hypnotic and dreamy kind of a record. A late night spin."

== Background and release ==
Following the release of Conway's second studio album, Bitch Epic, in 1993, Conway formed an experimental band Ultrasound with Willy Zygier, Bill McDonald and Paul Hester. The band released an album in 1995. Conway recorded My Third Husband in London and included a new recording of the Ultrasound song called "Only the Bones (Will Show)" which was released as the first single late in September 1997.

== Critical reception ==
Anni Prasad from It's a Girl Thing said; "My Third Husband is a significant step forward in her sonic evolution. Unlike its predecessors, it's fueled less by catchy-pop melodies and more by richly-textured, forward-looking atmospheres. The disc takes listeners on an unpredictable aural journey through tranquil and turbulent soundscapes. It derives its diversity from a mix of hypnotic rhythms, ambient synthwork and processed guitars—most of which are courtesy of Willy Zygier, her partner in crime and d'amour."

== Track listing ==
1. "All Of The Above"
2. "Only The Bones (Will Show)"
3. "Everything You Want It To Be"
4. "Here In My Arms"
5. "2001 Ultrasound"
6. "Feathers In My Mouth"
7. "The Way You Look Tonight"
8. "It's a Girl Thing"
9. "It's Only a Dream"
10. "Bag of Sweets"
- all tracks written by Deborah Conway and Willy Zygier

== Charts ==
Chart (1997)	Peak position
Australia (ARIA)	79

== Credits ==
Adapted from album liner.

- Engineer – Jock Loveland
- Mix assistants – Nick and Rafi
- Mastering – Ian Cooper
- Programming, Keyboards, Bass – Dave Anderson
- Programming – Andy Cox
- Drums – Roy Dodds
- Bass – Martain Swain
- Arrangements, programming, guitars, synthesisers, samplers and vocals – Willy Zygier
