= Philip Hyde =

Philip Hyde or Hide may refer to:

- Philip Hyde (actor) (born 1958), Australian actor
- Philip Hyde (photographer) (1921–2006), American landscape photographer
- Phil Hyde (cricketer), Australian cricketer
- Philip Hide in 2000 Grand National
- Phillip Hyde grant, see Amy Gulick
- Phil Hyde, songwriter on My Shiralee
