= Only the Bones =

Only the Bones - Deborah Conway's Greatest Hits

Greatest hits album by Deborah Conway
- Released: 15 July 2002
- Recorded: 1985–2001
- Genre: Pop
- Label: Festival Mushroom Records

Deborah Conway chronology
PC: The Songs of Patsy Cline (2001)	Only the Bones - Deborah Conway's Greatest Hits (2002)	Summertown (2004)

Only the Bones – Deborah Conway's Greatest Hits is the first greatest hits album by Australian artist Deborah Conway, released in July 2002. Conway toured Australia in support of the album. It was re-released, with a different cover, in July 2004 as The Definitive Collection.

Australian freelance music journalist, Debbie Kruger of Melbourne Weekly Bayside, described how Conway "put together a greatest hits collection of her work, Only the Bones, and then drew a line, as many mature artists do, from which she could move forward, redefined." Michael Dwyer opined that "It's 20 years since Deborah Conway's first EPs with Do Re Mi; an even dozen since her smash solo debut, String of Pearls. Last year's Only the Bones compilation summed up a commercially erratic but always interesting career." The original cover art, by Pierre Baroni, of Only the Bones depicts Conway at a table picking over a meal (see infobox).

== Track listing ==
1. "Man Overboard" (by Do-Re-Mi)
2. "It's Only the Beginning"
3. "Release Me"
4. "White Roses"
5. "Alive and Brilliant"
6. "Today I Am a Daisy"
7. "She Prefers Fire"
8. "3 Love" (by Ultrasound)
9. "Only the Bones (Will Show)"
10. "All of the Above"
11. "Here in My Arms"
12. "Radio Loves This"
13. "Never Far Away"
14. "Exquisite Stereo"
15. "Walking After Midnight"
16. "Sweet Dreams"
17. "Everybody Wants to Touch Me"
18. "It’s Only the Beginning" (Show Us Your Hits Mix)
