= A Can of Bees =

1979 album by the Soft Boys

Studio album by The Soft Boys
- Released: 24 April 1979
- Recorded: August–November 1978
- Studio: Spaceward Studios, Cambridge
- Genre: Post-punk
- Length: 40:46
- Label: Two Crabs; CLAW 1001 (original UK release)
- Producer: Spaceward

The Soft Boys chronology
A Can of Bees (1979)	Underwater Moonlight (1980)

Professional ratings
Review scores
Source	Rating
Allmusic	4/5 stars
Alternative Rock	5/10
The Encyclopedia of Popular Music	3/5 stars
The Great Rock Discography	7/10
Indiana Daily Student	B
MusicHound Rock	3/5
The New Rolling Stone Album Guide	3.5/5 stars
Pitchfork	7.5/10
Popmatters	8/10

A Can of Bees is the 1979 debut album by English rock band The Soft Boys. The album was reissued in 1984 with a different track listing on the second side. Both versions of side two appear on the CD reissue first put out by Two Crabs in 1990, subsequently reissued by Rykodisc in 1992, and Yep Roc in 2010.

== Track listing ==
All tracks are written by Robyn Hitchcock, except where noted.

No.	Title	Writer(s)	Length
1.	"Give It to the Soft Boys"		1:57
2.	"The Pig Worker"		4:30
3.	"Human Music"		4:30
4.	"Leppo and the Jooves"		5:27
5.	"The Rat's Prayer"		3:19
6.	"Do the Chisel"		3:03
7.	"Sandra's Having Her Brain Out"		3:47
8.	"The Return of the Sacred Crab"		2:54
9.	"Cold Turkey" (Live)	John Lennon	4:17
10.	"School Dinner Blues" (Live)		2:26
11.	"Wading Through a Ventilator" (Live)		4:08

=== 1984 reissue track listing ===
No.	Title	Writer(s)	Length
1.	"Give It to the Soft Boys"		1:57
2.	"The Pigworker"		4:29
3.	"Human Music"		4:31
4.	"Leppo & The Jooves"		5:29
5.	"The Rats Prayer"		3:19
6.	"Do the Chisel"		3:03
7.	"Sandra's Having Her Brain Out"		3:39
8.	"Fatman's Son"		2:38
9.	"(I Want to Be An) Anglepoise Lamp" (Live)		2:51
10.	"Ugly Nora" (Live)		3:05
11.	"Cold Turkey"	John Lennon	4:16

=== 1992 CD reissue track listing ===
No.	Title	Writer(s)	Length
1.	"Give It to the Soft Boys"		1:57
2.	"The Pig Worker"		4:30
3.	"Human Music"		4:30
4.	"Leppo and the Jooves"		5:27
5.	"The Rat's Prayer"		3:19
6.	"Do the Chisel"		3:03
7.	"Sandra's Having Her Brain Out"		3:47
8.	"The Return of the Sacred Crab"		2:54
9.	"Cold Turkey" (Live)	John Lennon	4:17
10.	"School Dinner Blues" (Live)		2:26
11.	"Wading Through a Ventilator" (Live)		4:08
12.	"Leppo & The Jooves"		5:29
13.	"Sandra's Having Her Brain Out"		3:39
14.	"School Dinner Blues"		2:14
15.	"Fatman's Son"		2:38
16.	"(I Want to Be An) Anglepoise Lamp" (Live)		2:51
17.	"Ugly Nora" (Live)		3:05

== Personnel ==
- Robyn Hitchcock – guitar, vocals
- Kimberley Rew – guitar
- Jim Melton – harmonica, percussion
- Gerry Hale – violin
- Andy Metcalfe – bass
- Morris Windsor – drums

Technical

- Mike Kemp – engineer
