= Summertown (album) =

Summertime

Studio album by Deborah Conway and Willy Zygier
- Released: August 2004
- Genre: Alternative rock music; rock; acoustic
- Label: Another Intercorps Production
- Producer: Deborah Conway; Willy Zygier; Gerry Hale

Deborah Conway chronology
Only the Bones (2002)	Summertime (2004)	Half Man Half Woman (2010)

"Summertown" is the collaborative studio album by Australian singer songwriter Deborah Conway and Willy Zygier. It was released in August 2004 via Another Intercrops Production. It is Conway's sixth studio album.

A music video for "Something's Right" was released in 2004 to promote the album.

== Background and release ==
Upon release, Conway and Zygier said; "We started talking about songs we liked from a pre-electronic era; artists like Simon & Garfunkel, The Mammas and the Pappas, Jimmy Webb, James Taylor & Carole King all came up in our conversations along with many others. We didn’t want to recreate them but we wanted to evoke that spirit, that approach to song-craft; beautifully realised verses, choruses and bridges that seem to have always belonged together even before they came into being. Also a certain gentleness and warmth that we hadn’t explored seemed like the path that was beckoning. We’ve been angst, brittle, pissed off and depressed, let’s give peace a chance." adding "We expressly wanted to make an acoustic record and upright bass was the obvious route to take."

== Critical reception ==
Kathy Macabe from Daily Telegraph said; "Blessed with an angelic voice, deft at lyrical wordplay and armed with a seemingly inexhaustive melody well, Conway – and partner Zygier – create songs which become best friends for life. You can hear the influence of her Patsy Cline tribute shows lingering in "One Chance", while "Accidents Happen In The Home" recalls Martha Davis. Beautifully played, you can hear every single note and the care taken to let the songs breathe." Annette Basile from Rolling Stone Australia said; "There are two potentially scary aspects about Summertown. Firstly, Deb Conway wants to be "mature"; and secondly, it's incredibly ambitious to aim to write songs as perfect as those of Carole King, James Taylor et al. But these fears are unfounded. Apart from the odd uneasy moment, Summertown is magical." adding "Conway and Zygier create upbeat gems, dramatic ballad, lullabies and pop with country music being an almost unconscious influence." Barry Divola from Who Magazine said; "Conway's storytelling ability has developed to a point where she's not afraid to tackle the big old genres" adding " I've ploughed through many, many albums by female singer-songwriters of late that are either overly flowery or cloyingly self-obsessed, so it's pleasant to hear Conway tiptoeing a fairly steady line between heartbreak and infatuation with barely a hiccup."

== Track listing ==
1. "Stay On Track"
2. "Accidents Happen In The Home"
3. "Any Fool"
4. "Try To Save Your Song"
5. "Something's Right"
6. "Sunday Morning" (featuring Toni Collette)
7. "One Chance"
8. "Sleepwalker"
9. "I Love You But"
10. "It Doesn't Work That Way" (with Paul Kelly)
11. "Heartache"
12. "Here And Now"
- all tracks written by Conway and Zygier.

== Credits ==
- Backing Vocals – Kim Wheeler
- Musicians - Deborah Conway, Willy Zygier, Gerry Hale, James Black, Shannon Birchall
- Additional musicians: Dave Williams, Toni Collette, Paul Kelly, Kim Wheeler, Michael Barker
