= Under My Skin (Deborah Conway song) =

1991 single by Deborah Conway

- CD single cover

Single by Deborah Conway

from the album String of Pearls
- B-side: "It's All Part of My Education"
- Released: 23 September 1991
- Label: Mushroom
- Songwriter(s): Dorland Bray; Deborah Conway; Scott Cutler
- Producer(s): Joe Hardy

Deborah Conway singles chronology
"It's Only the Beginning" (1991)	"Under My Skin" (1991)	"Release Me" (1992)

"Under My Skin" is a song by Australian singer-songwriter Deborah Conway. It was released as the second single from her debut studio album String of Pearls (1991). It peaked at number 34 in Australia in December 1991.

== Track listing ==
7-inch and CD single

1. "Under My Skin" – 3:36
2. "It's All Part of My Education" – 4:34

== Charts ==
Chart (1991)	Peak position
Australia (ARIA)	34
