= Smoke (Paul Kelly album) =

Studio album by Paul Kelly
- Released: October 1999
- Recorded: Adelphia Studios
- Genre: Bluegrass, Pop
- Length: 40:58
- Label: Gawdaggie; EMI
- Producer: Paul Kelly & Gerry Hale

Paul Kelly chronology
| Words and Music (1998) | Smoke (1999) | ...Nothing but a Dream (2001) |

Smoke is an album by Paul Kelly and Melbourne bluegrass band, Uncle Bill, which was composed of Gerry Hale on guitar, dobro, mandolin, fiddle and vocals, Adam Gare on fiddle, mandolin and vocals, Peter Somerville on banjo and vocals and Stuart Speed on double bass. The album featured a mix of old and new Kelly songs treated in classic bluegrass fashion.

Kelly had previously recorded with Uncle Bill, "Thanks a Lot" for the 1997 compilation, Where Joy Kills Sorrow, on the W.Minc label, and "Sunlander" in 1998 for the Not So Dusty (Slim Dusty) tribute album.

It was released on Kelly's new label, Gawdaggie, through EMI Records in Australia in October 1999 and peaked at #36 on the national chart.

"Our Sunshine" draws upon the story of Ned Kelly's life, in particular the 1991 book by Robert Drewe, Our Sunshine and Ned Kelly: A Short History by Ian Jones.

Smoke won three awards from the Victorian Country Music Association Best Group (Open), Best Group (Victorian), and Album of the Year in 2000.

== Track listing ==
All tracks written by Paul Kelly, except where noted.

| No. | Title | Writer(s) | Length |
|---|---|---|---|
| 1. | "Our Sunshine" | Paul Kelly, Mick Thomas | 4:22 |
| 2. | "You Can't Take It with You" | | 2:51 |
| 3. | "Until Death Do Them Part" | | 3:14 |
| 4. | "I Can't Believe We Were Married" | | 3:28 |
| 5. | "I Don't Remember a Thing" | | 3:11 |
| 6. | "Teach Me Tonight" | | 2:43 |
| 7. | "Sydney from a 747" | | 2:28 |
| 8. | "Night After Night" | Paul Kelly, Gerry Hale | 2:59 |
| 9. | "Whistling Bird" | | 3:22 |
| 10. | "Stories of Me" | | 2:14 |
| 11. | "Taught by Experts" | | 3:09 |
| 12. | "Gathering Storm" | Paul Kelly, Jex Saarelaht | 2:35 |
| 13. | "Shy Before You Lord" | | 3:58 |

== Personnel ==
- Paul Kelly – vocals, guitar
- Gerry Hale – guitar, mandolin, fiddle, dobro, lap steel, vocals
- Adam Gare – mandolin, fiddle, vocals
- Peter Somerville – banjo, vocals
- Stuart Speed – double bass, vocals

== Credits ==
- Produced by Paul Kelly and Gerry Hale
- Mixed by Simon Polinski
- Assisted by Christian Scallon & Adam Rhodes
- Mastered by Ross Cockle
- Design & Photography - Ben Cunningham
- Cover Art by Reg Mombassa

== Charts ==
| Chart (1999) | Peak position |
|---|---|
| Australian Albums (ARIA) | 36 |

== Certifications ==
| Region | Certification | Certified units/sales |
|---|---|---|
| Australia (ARIA) | Gold | 35,000^{‡} |
^{‡} Sales+streaming figures based on certification alone.
