= Epic Theatre (EP) =

EP by Deborah Conway
- Released: May 1994
- Recorded: 13/14 May 1994 at Athenaeum Theatre, Melbourne
- Genre: Rock; pop; alternative rock; acoustic music
- Label: Mushroom Records
- Producer: William Zygier

Deborah Conway chronology
Bitch Epic (1993)	Epic Theatre (1994)	My Third Husband (1997)

Alternative cover
- Bitch Epic plus Epic Theatre Live Double CD Pack

"Epic Theatre" is the live extended play by Australia rock singer-songwriter and guitarist, Deborah Conway. The EP was recorded over two Athenaeum shows in Melbourne on 13 and 14 May 1994, during the promotional tour of the Bitch Epic album.

The album was released individually and as a double pack with the Bitch Epic album.

== Track listing ==
1. "Buried Treasure" (Conway)
2. "Madame Butterfly is in Trouble" (Conway)
3. "Parabasis" (Conway/Zygier)
4. "Will You Miss Me When You're Sober" (Conway)
5. "White Roses" (Conway/Bray)
6. "Get Stripped" (Zygier)
7. "String of Pearls" (Conway)
8. "Today I am a Daisy" (Conway/Zygier)
