= Rank Strangers =

The Rank Strangers Bluegrass Band
- From left to right: Gary Forrester, Philomena Carroll, Peter Somerville, Andrew Hook

Background information
- Origin: Melbourne, Australia
- Genres: Bluegrass
- Years active: 1988–1992

Disambiguation note: This Australian group should not be confused with the Swedish group Rank Strangers, formed in the 1960s, nor groups who later adopted the same name, including a Minneapolis-based indie-rock group, a Rhode Island bluegrass band, and an Oregon acoustic group.

The Rank Strangers were an Australian bluegrass band that won multiple national and international awards during the late 1980s and early 1990s. Random House’s 1991 book Australian Country Music declared the Rank Strangers to be among the major figures of the 1990s Australian music scene, along with Keith Urban and country legend Slim Dusty. Australian Country Music observed that "the Rank Strangers have a musical immediacy that typifies the best of bluegrass and recalls such players as The Stanley Brothers and Bill Monroe."

== Members ==
- Peter Somerville (vocals and banjo)
- Philomena Carroll (vocals and bass)
- Andrew Hook (mandolin)
- Eddie Rambeaux (stage name for Gary Forrester) (songwriter, singer, and guitarist)
- Gerry Hale (fiddle and mandolin)

The Rank Strangers on stage in Iowa during their 1990 USA tour

Other occasional members included Belinda Moody on bass, Ian Tritt on mandolin, Di McNicol on guitar and vocals, and other Australian and American instrumentalists.

== Work ==
The bulk of their record albums consisted of original material, although they also included time-honoured bluegrass standards in their repertoire. Following the band’s break-up in the early 1990s, Somerville and Hale went on to lead bands of their own, while Forrester embarked on a career as a writer. His 2006 novel Houseboating in the Ozarks includes a fictionalized account of the Rank Strangers.

The Rank Strangers at the IBMA Bluegrass Fan Fest in Kentucky, 1990, with Alison Krauss's songwriter and bass player, Jon Pennell, on bass

In 1988, the Rank Strangers swept the Australian Gospel Music Awards in Tamworth, New South Wales, winning Best Group, Best Male Vocalist, and Best Composition. In 1989 and 1990, Dust on the Bible (RCA Records, Nicholls & Dimes) and Uluru (Larrikin Records) both placed in the top five for the overall Australian Country Music Awards.

In 1990-91, their third album, Kamara, was released to coincide with tours of Australia and the USA. These tours culminated in performances before the International Bluegrass Music Association (IBMA) in Owensboro, Kentucky, alongside Emmylou Harris, Bill Monroe, Alison Krauss, Ralph Stanley, Doyle Lawson, Hot Rize, Peter Rowan, and others. The Rank Strangers were also headliners at the Station Inn in Nashville, and the IBMA Bluegrass Fan Fest in Louisville, Kentucky, supporting guitar legend Tony Rice's bluegrass band.

Bluegrass Unlimited, the bible of bluegrass music, declared that "the Rank Strangers have a unique angle on bluegrass music, and ought to be proud of making their own brand of music come out on top in the Land Down Under." BU described "Uluru" as "one of the most intellectually stimulating bluegrass works of recent years, and it cannot be restricted to mere national boundaries." The band was the subject of a feature article in the December 1988 issue of the magazine. In 1990, the Rank Strangers finished second in the world (to a Czech band), in an international competition sponsored by the IBMA.

== Selected discography ==
- Dust on the Bible. RCA (Nicholls and Dimes) (1988) (finalist, Australian Country Music Awards)
- Uluru. Larrikin Records (Australia) (1989) (finalist, Australian Country Music Awards)
- Kamara. Troubadour Records (Australia) (1990)
