= String of Pearls (album) =

String Of Pearls

Studio album by Deborah Conway
- Released: October 25, 1991
- Recorded: 1990−91
- Studio: Metropolis Audio, Melbourne; Ardent Studios, Memphis
- Genre: Rock; pop; adult contemporary
- Label: Mushroom Records
- Producer: Joe Hardy; Michael den Elzen; Richard Pleasance

Deborah Conway chronology
String Of Pearls (1991)	Seven Deadly Sins (1993)

Singles from String of Pearls
- 1. "It's Only the Beginning" Released: June 1991; 2. "Under My Skin" Released: September 1991; 3. "Release Me" Released: January 1992; 4. "White Roses" Released: May 1992

String of Pearls is the debut studio album by the Australian rock singer-songwriter and guitarist Deborah Conway, released on 25 October, 1991, by Mushroom Records. The album is a Rock, pop and adult contemporary record.

The platinum-selling album is Conway's most successful album to date and peaked at number twenty on the Australian ARIA Charts. At the ARIA Music Awards of 1992, the album was nominated for four awards; Breakthrough Artist – Album, Album of the Year, Best Cover Art, and Best Female Artist. It won Best Female Artist.

In June 2015, Conway celebrated the 25th anniversary of the album by performing the entire album in Melbourne.

== Background ==
Conway worked on the album for three years prior to its release. In the cover notes, Conway detailed how the album timeline had entailed "six producers, four false starts, three continents and two record companies."

The album's release was preceded by the release of the first single in June 1991, It's Only the Beginning, which became a radio hit.

== Track listing ==
No.	Title	Writer(s)	Length
1.	"Release Me"	Deborah Conway; Scott Cutler	4:45
2.	"It's Only the Beginning"	Conway; Cutler	4:39
3.	"Under My Skin"	Conway; Cutler; Dorland Bray	3:28
4.	"Buried Treasure"	Conway	3:34
5.	"Will You Miss Me When You’re Sober"	Conway	3:54
6.	"White Roses"	Conway; Bray	3:48
7.	"For All the Wrong Reasons"	Conway	4:08
8.	"Someday"	Conway; Paul Kelly; Bray	3:38
9.	"King of Jordan"	Conway; Richard Pleasance	4:03
10.	"Deborah Conway’s Nightmare #347"	Conway	3:36
11.	"String of Pearls"	Conway	6:03
12.	"Last to Know"	Conway; Kelly	3:25

== Critical reception ==
Professional ratings
Review scores
Source	Rating
Allmusic	4/5 stars

Upon its release, the album received praise from music critics across Australia.

Jonathan Lewis from AllMusic said "String of Pearls ranges from the melodic pop of the most successful single "It's Only the Beginning" to the rock of "Under My Skin". Much of the rest of the album is acoustic pop and gentle ballads, with the superb "Release Me" being the best example. Conway's voice is what holds the album together. Her voice is strong and suited to these songs. In the hands of a lesser singer String of Pearls would not have been anywhere near as effective. Instead, Conway manages to cover the slight lack of originality in songwriting by her strong presence and produces a memorable set of songs."

David Harris of The Australian Jewish News wrote a positive review, comparing her vocal performance with Carly Simon and praising her "versatility and talent".

== Charts ==
Chart (1991/92)	Peak position
Australian Albums (ARIA)	20

== Certifications ==
Region	Certification	Certified units/sales
Australia (ARIA)	Gold	35,000^{^}
^{^} Shipments figures based on certification alone.

== Credits ==
- Accordion – Dror Erez, Rick Staff
- Autoharp – Michael den Elzen
- Bass – Dave Cochrane, Michael den Elzen, Nigel Griggs, Richard Pleasance
- Cello – Peter O'Reilly
- Drums – Greg Morrow, Peter Jones
- Drums [Snare] – Peter Maslen
- Engineer – Doug Roberts, Joe Hardy
- Guitar – Michael den Elzen, Richard Pleasance, Deborah Conway
- Harmonica – Chris Wilson
- Mandolin – Richard Pleasance
- Organ – Alan Harding, Lawrence Maddy, Mick O'Connor, Rick Staff
- Percussion – Greg Morrow, Michael den Elzen, Peter Maslen, Richard Pleasance
- Piano – Alan Harding, Dror Erez, Richard Pleasance
- Tambourine – Peter Maslen
- Trumpet – Vince Jones
- Violin – Ann Hickey, Tom Fitzgerald
- Vocals (backing) – Deborah Conway, Joe Hardy, Linda Bull, Michael den Elzen, Richard Pleasance, Vika Bull, Vince Jones
