= Underwater Moonlight =

1980 album by the Soft Boys

Studio album by the Soft Boys
- Released: June 1980
- Recorded: June 1979 – June 1980
- Studios: Spaceward (Cambridge); Alaska (London); James Morgan (London)
- Genres: Neo-psychedelia; post-punk; new wave; psychedelic pop; jangle pop; power pop
- Length: 36:00
- Label: Armageddon
- Producers: Pat Collier; Spaceward staff

The Soft Boys chronology
A Can of Bees (1979)	Underwater Moonlight (1980)	Invisible Hits (1983)

Underwater Moonlight is the second studio album by English rock band the Soft Boys, released in June 1980 by record label Armageddon. The album received little critical notice and was a commercial failure, and the band split up a few months after its release. However, Underwater Moonlight has retrospectively been viewed as a psychedelic classic, influential on the development of the neo-psychedelia music genre and on a number of bands, especially R.E.M.

== Recording ==
The album was recorded in June 1979 at Spaceward Studios in Cambridge, and between January and June 1980 at the Alaska and James Morgan studios in London. The London sessions were produced by Pat Collier, while the Cambridge sessions were produced by Spaceward Studios staff. The recordings were made on 4-track and 8-track, and only cost £600.

== Release ==
Underwater Moonlight was released in June 1980 by Armageddon Records.

The album was initially unsuccessful commercially, especially in the United Kingdom, where over half the sales were exports to America.

== Music ==
Garrett Martin of Paste Magazine explained: "Today it’s hard to understand how the lightly psychedelic pop-rock of the Soft Boys was ever considered anything close to punk. Frontman Robyn Hitchcock is basically just Elvis Costello without the need to appear at every all-star jam."

== Critical reception ==
Underwater Moonlight's release in June 1980 coincided with a printers' strike in the UK that halted production of IPC Media's magazines, including NME and Melody Maker, for six weeks until July. Consequently, there were few contemporary reviews of the album in the UK. Melody Maker reviewed the album when it returned, with Paul Tickell praising the production but saying "the impact wears off once you get used to the novelty of a band not so much capturing a fully-blown late Sixties psychedelia, as searching for the moment when mid-Sixties bands were teetering on its mushrooming brink". Tickell said the best tracks were the ones that felt most contemporary, but concluded, "By the end of Underwater Moonlight you're left with the feeling of some good ideas and songs blighted. The Soft Boys have yet to sort out the points where excess and mannerism ruin rock 'n' roll and where they enhance it."

In the short-lived music magazine New Music News, Mark Ellen gave an enthusiastic review of the album, describing it as "another headlong plunge into the acid-rock grotesque" and the lyrics as "another gonzo Bosch landscape". Ellen said that the band "raze the whole apparatus of rock 'n' roll and cultivate weeds round the foundations. They juggle with its time signatures, and – when the going gets straight – they throttle it with dischords", concluding that they "compound something fiercely mutant but still funny (very), easy to absorb, commercial (yes!), and a lot less elite and sarcastic than you might be led to believe" and that the album "has more than flashes of brilliance". Music Week described the record as "a fine second album", saying "Crossing over from the late Sixties-orientated rock in the vein of Syd Barrett and sometimes Lou Reed to the British new wave, their music is slightly avant garde, yet flows well".

Professional ratings
Legacy reviews
Review scores
Source	Rating
AllMusic	5/5 stars
Chicago Tribune	4/4 stars
Entertainment Weekly	A
Mojo	5/5 stars
NME	8/10
Pitchfork	9.0/10
The Rolling Stone Album Guide	4.5/5 stars
Select	5/5
Spin	9/10
Uncut	5/5 stars

Legacy reviews have overwhelmingly praised the album. Reviewing the 1990 reissue on Glass Fish Records, Henry Williams of Q gave the record four stars out of five and called it "one of the period's best, if unsung, albums". Reviewing the 2001 expanded version Underwater Moonlight... And How It Got There for the same magazine, Martin Aston said that it was "suave and sparkly, essentially the template for '80s college rock". Bill Holdship of Rolling Stone, in his 2001 review, wrote that the album "offers modern listeners some great, great rock songs". In his retrospective review, Stephen Thomas Erlewine, writing for AllMusic, felt that the music on the album showed the influence of the Beatles, the Byrds and Syd Barrett. In 2016, Garrett Martin of Paste said, "Underwater Moonlight sounds like the best bar band in the world playing hits from a world that's better than our own. 'I Wanna Destroy You' and 'Queen of Eyes', especially, should be radio staples." It is included in Robert Dimery's 1001 Albums You Must Hear Before You Die.

== Legacy ==
Whilst commercially unsuccessful originally, Underwater Moonlight has gone on to be viewed as a one-off psychedelic classic. Matt LeMay of Pitchfork, in a 2010 review, felt that the album was commercially unsuccessful because the timing was wrong: at the time of its release, audiences had little interest in "music that incorporated the indelible harmonies of the Byrds and the surrealism of Syd Barrett", but that anyhow the album is "best considered with the benefit of hindsight, and for all the famous music it inspired, there is still nothing quite like Underwater Moonlight". In 2001, Bill Holdship of Rolling Stone wrote that the album's influences could be detected "on bands ranging from R.E.M. and the Replacements to the Stone Roses and the Pixies". According to Stephen Thomas Erlewine of AllMusic, Underwater Moonlight "influenced the jangle pop of R.E.M. and other underground pop of the 1980s."

== Track listing ==
All tracks are written by Robyn Hitchcock, except as noted.

Side A
No.	Title	Length
1.	"I Wanna Destroy You"	2:52
2.	"Kingdom of Love"	4:10
3.	"Positive Vibrations"	3:10
4.	"I Got the Hots"	4:42
5.	"Insanely Jealous"	4:15

Side B
No.	Title	Writer(s)	Length
1.	"Tonight"		3:44
2.	"You'll Have to Go Sideways"	Hitchcock, Kimberley Rew	2:57
3.	"Old Pervert"	Hitchcock, Rew, Matthew Seligman, Morris Windsor	3:52
4.	"Queen of Eyes"		2:01
5.	"Underwater Moonlight"		4:17

Reissue bonus tracks: Album outtakes
No.	Title	Writer(s)	Length
11.	"He's a Reptile" (from Invisible Hits album, 1983; not included on the 1990 Glass Fish and 1992 Rykodisc CDs)		4:27
12.	"Vegetable Man" (from Canadian and German editions of Underwater Moonlight, 1980; Near the Soft Boys EP, 1980)	Syd Barrett	2:59
13.	"Strange" (from German edition of Underwater Moonlight, 1980; Near the Soft Boys)		2:59
14.	"Only the Stones Remain" (from Two Halves for the Price of One album, 1981)		2:50
15.	"Where Are the Prawns?" (from Two Halves for the Price of One)		6:06
16.	"Dreams" (from Underwater Moonlight 1990 reissue)		4:37
17.	"Black Snake Diamond Rock" (from Two Halves for the Price of One)		4:24
18.	"There's Nobody Like You" (from Two Halves for the Price of One)		3:11
19.	"Song #4" (single B-side, 1983)		4:35

Matador reissue bonus disc: ... And How It Got There
No.	Title	Writer(s)	Length
1.	"Old Pervert – Section 1"	Hitchcock, Rew, Seligman, Windsor	1:38
2.	"Like a Real Smoothie"		3:43
3.	"Alien"		3:13
4.	"Bloat (Extract)"	Hitchcock, Rew, Seligman, Windsor	1:00
5.	"Underwater Moonlight"		6:24
6.	"She Wears My Hair"		5:22
7.	"Wang Dang Pig"		3:56
8.	"Old Pervert – Section 2"	Hitchcock, Rew, Seligman, Windsor	1:31
9.	"Insanely Jealous"		5:03
10.	"Leave Me Alone"	Lou Reed	6:45
11.	"Goodbye Maurice or Steve"		3:14
12.	"Old Pervert – Section 3"	Hitchcock, Rew, Seligman, Windsor	0:36
13.	"Cherries"	Hitchcock, Rew, Seligman, Windsor	2:54
14.	"Amputated"		4:22
15.	"Over You"	Bryan Ferry, Phil Manzanera	4:00
16.	"I Wanna, Er ... (Extract)"	Hitchcock, Rew, Seligman, Windsor	0:42
17.	"Old Pervert – Section 4"	Hitchcock, Rew, Seligman, Windsor	1:24

All the tracks on this disc were taken from rehearsal recordings.

Matador 3-LP reissue bonus 7" single
No.	Title	Writer(s)	Length
1.	"Innocent Boy" (Studio outtake)	Hitchcock, Martin Stanway-Mayers
2.	"Zip-Zip" (Recorded live at Maxwell's, Hoboken, NJ, 1980)	James A. Smith
3.	"Astronomy Domine" (Recorded live at Maxwell's, Hoboken, NJ, 1980)	Barrett

== Personnel ==
Credits adapted from the 2001 Matador reissue liner notes.

The Soft Boys

- Robyn Hitchcock – guitar, vocals, rhythm bass (5)
- Kimberley Rew – guitar, vocals, bass (7), synthesiser (7)
- Matthew Seligman – bass
- Morris Windsor – drums, vocals

Additional personnel

- Gerry Hale – violin (5, 10)
- Andy King – sitar (3)

Technical personnel

- Pat Collier – production (1–3, 5, 6, 8–10, 12–18), engineering (1, 8, 12–18)
- James Morgan – engineering (2, 3, 5, 6, 9, 10)
- Mike Kemp – production, engineering (4, 7, 11, 19)
- The Soft Boys – production (4, 7, 11, 19)

Production notes

- Disc 1: tracks 4, 7, 11, 19 recorded June 1979 at Spaceward Studios, Cambridge; all other tracks, except track 14, recorded January–June 1980 at Alaska and James Morgan studios, London; track 14 recorded July 1980 at Alaska, London
- Disc 2: rehearsals taped on a boombox or recorded on a two-track machine at the Cambridge Rowing Club Boathouse, September 1979–July 1980
