= PC: The Songs of Patsy Cline =

Studio album by Deborah Conway
- Released: August 2001
- Genre: Pop rock; theatrical
- Label: Another Intercorps Production
- Producer: Cameron Reynolds; Willy Zygier

Deborah Conway chronology
Exquisite Stereo (2000)	PC: The Songs of Patsy Cline (2001)	Only the Bones (2002)

PC: The Songs of Patsy Cline is the fifth studio album by Australia rock singer-songwriter and guitarist, Deborah Conway. It was released in August 2001 via Another Intercrops Production.

This album was made while Conway was in the stage show of Always…Patsy Cline, in which Conway sang of Cline's songs and received rave reviews and a nomination for the Helpmann Award for Best Female Actor in a Musical. The album is not the recording from the show itself, rather a studio recordings of Patsy Cline songs.

== Track listing ==
1. "I Fall to Pieces"
2. "Back In Baby's Arms"
3. "Crazy"
4. "Sweet Dreams (Of You)" (featuring Glenn Richards)
5. "Lovesick Blues"
6. "Eyes Of A Child"
7. "So Wrong"
8. "Your Cheating Heart"
9. "Walkin' After Midnight"
10. "She's Got You"

== Credits ==
- Deborah Conway - vocals
- Rebecca Barnard - vocals
- Glenn Richards - vocals ("Sweet Dreams (Of You)")
- Edmond Ammendola - bass
- Gerry Hale - fiddle, mandolin, banjo
- Tim Neal - Hammond organ, piano, alto saxophone ("Walking After Midnight")
- Russell Smith - trombone ("Walking After Midnight")
- Willy Zygier - producer
- Cam Reynolds - producer
- Tony 'Jack the Bear' Mantz - mastering
- Chris Thompson - mixing
