= Gary Jeshel Forrester =

American poet

Gary (Jeshel) Forrester
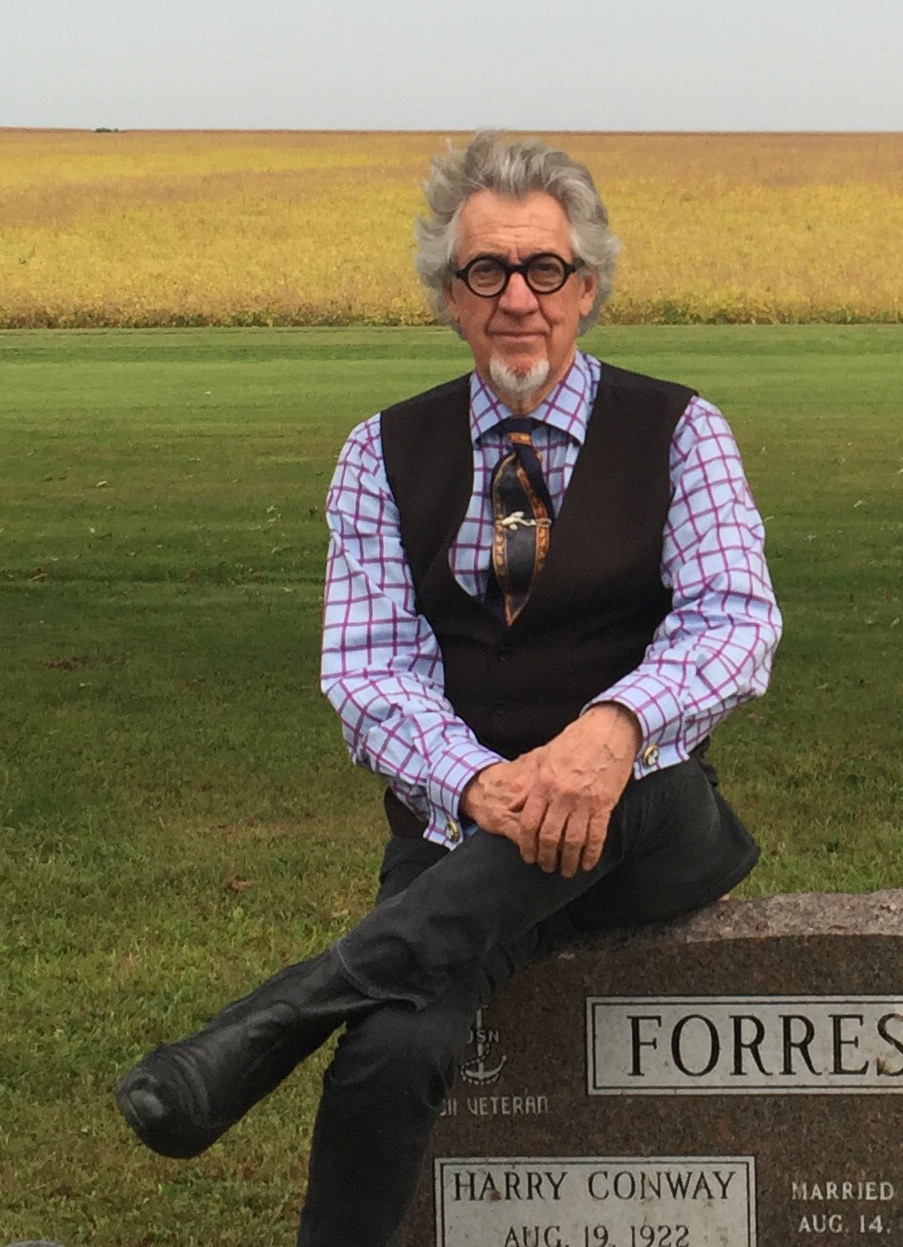
- Forrester in Morrisonville, Illinois 2016
- Born: 3 July 1946 (age 80); Decatur, Illinois, U.S.
- Occupations: Musician; writer; public servant; academic; lawyer; organic farmer
- Writing career
- Genres: Novels, poetry, short stories, memoirs, bluegrass

Gary (Jeshel) Forrester (born 3 July 1946) is a musician, writer, and academic from Rotorua, New Zealand. He was profiled by Random House Australia (Australian Country Music, 1991) as one of the major figures in the Australian music scene during the 1980s and 1990s, and in New Zealand by FishHead: Wellington's Magazine as a "modern Renaissance man." In a 2018 interview with New Zealand's leading newspaper, Forrester was described by the Sunday Star-Times as "a Native American descendant, on his mother's side ... who settled in New Zealand in 2006. [He is] a published author and poet and has released three solo albums in the past three years."

According to Fishhead, in addition to his teaching fellowship lecturing in legal ethics at the Victoria University of Wellington Law School from 2008 to 2016, Forrester had published "three novels and a book of poems, [was] a successful bluegrass composer and musician, an advocate for indigenous rights, and a father of six children." He taught at the University of Melbourne from 1976 to 1980, at the Northwestern School of Law in Oregon from 1983 to 1985, at Deakin University from 1991 to 1992, at the University of Illinois from 2000 to 2003, at Victoria University of Wellington from 2008 to 2016, and, from 2024 to 2026, at Batumi Shota Rustaveli State University in the Transcaucasian country of Georgia. The latter position with Batumi Shota Rustaveli State University was undertaken by Forrester, initially, as a Peace Corps Volunteer, 55 years after he first served in the Peace Corps in Guyana, South America, in the 1960s. At the age of 78, he became one of the oldest of the 250,000 persons to have served in the Peace Corps' 62-year history.

Beginning in the 1980s, he represented Indian tribes in securing restoration legislation through the United States Congress; authored a text on American Indian law; and wrote numerous articles on the rights of indigenous peoples, the environment, civil procedure, and other legal topics.

Strangers To Us All: Lawyers and Poetry said that "Forrester is a hard man to pigeon-hole. He has practiced law, taught law, and spent time away from the legal profession. He is a singer, musician, poet, and writer."

== Bluegrass, folk, and Americana music ==
Forrester's bluegrass compositions were recorded (under his "nom de guitar" Eddie Rambeaux) on the albums Dust on the Bible (RCA Records, 1987), Uluru (Larrikin Records, 1988) and Kamara (Troubadour Records, 1990).

In 1988, Forrester's single "Uluru" was featured on two national commemorative albums by the Australian Broadcasting Corporation (the ABC), as "the cream of a very rich mix" of Australian country music. The ABC observed: "Like our landscape, the history of Australia is best told by our poets, and this recording offers a unique slice... of our bushland, our people, our dreams, and our extraordinary sense of humour." Forrester's music also appeared on the Larrikin Records 1996 composite album, Give Me a Home Among the Gum Trees.

The Rank Strangers toured Australia and America. The American tour included appearances at the Station Inn in Nashville and the IBMA Fan Fest in Owensboro, Kentucky, as well as headlining at the Louisville Bluegrass and American MusicFest in Kentucky.

Between 2015 and 2018, Forrester issued his first three solo albums, Alma Rose, Jeshel, and The Old Churchyard (Te Ahumairangi Records), featuring 30 new compositions.

The Rank Strangers at the IBMA Bluegrass Fan Fest in Kentucky, 1990. Filling in on bass is Alison Krauss's bass player and songwriter Jon Pennell.

In 2020, while in isolation during New Zealand's COVID-19 lockdown, Forrester put together a new solo acoustic album of 11 original songs and 2 covers, for non-commercial release on the Bandcamp online music streaming website. During the lockdown, the only available recording device at his lakeside cabin was a cell phone, so the new collection of songs was titled The Covid Phone Album.

=== Awards ===
In 1988, the Rank Strangers won Best Group, Best Male Vocalist, and Best Composition at the Australian Gospel Music Awards. In 1990, the Rank Strangers finished second in an international competition sponsored by the International Bluegrass Music Association (IBMA), Nashville, Tennessee.

=== Critical reception ===
In 1988, Forrester's single "Uluru" was featured on two national commemorative albums by the Australian Broadcasting Corporation (the ABC), as "the cream of a very rich mix" of Australian country music. The ABC observed: "Like our landscape, the history of Australia is best told by our poets, and this recording offers a unique slice... of our bushland, our people, our dreams, and our extraordinary sense of humour."

Random House Australia's 1991 profile declared that "the most striking aspect of the albums, apart from their frequency, is the exceptionally high standard of songwriting." Australian Country Music observed that the bluegrass band fronted by Forrester (as lead singer and guitarist), the Rank Strangers, "have a musical immediacy that typifies the best of bluegrass and recalls such players as The Stanley Brothers and Bill Monroe."

According to Country Beat, Australia's country music journal, Dust on the Bible was "one of the best bluegrass-country albums released in Australia" in 1987, and Forrester was "one of the best songwriters living in Australia." In December 1988, Mike Jackson of The Canberra Times wrote that the Rank Strangers' second album, Uluru (the Aboriginal name for Australia's central Ayers Rock), "featured some delightful lead breaks on mandolin (Andrew Hook), banjo (Peter Somerville) and fiddle (Gerry Hale), and some rock-solid accompaniment from guitarist (Forrester) and bass player (Philomena Carroll)." Jackson said that the album was "worth buying for the fiddle playing alone. Hale shows great technique and a flair for appropriate harmony lines while matching the punch of the mandolin and banjo well."

Bluegrass Unlimited said that "the Rank Strangers have a unique angle on bluegrass music, and ought to be proud of making their own brand of music come out on top in the Land Down Under." BU described Uluru as "one of the most intellectually stimulating bluegrass works of recent years, and it cannot be restricted to mere national boundaries." The Rank Strangers were the subject of a feature article in the December 1988 issue of Bluegrass Unlimited. In a 2011 retrospective, BU featured the career of the Rank Strangers' banjo guru Peter Somerville, and recalled Forrester as "an excellent songwriter" of "challenging original material."

International Country Music News wrote that the compositions contained "archetypal elements of nostalgia, humour and religion", as well as themes that were "contemporary and Australian in influence." Eberhard Finke, writing in Bluegrass-Bühne, identified the source of some of the compositions: "In 1987 when his grandfather died in Illinois, he put his grief into writing songs. Not that they are sad songs – there are swinging happy ones, with plenty of religious overtones that brought him closer to his grandfather's legacy. He tuned his guitar to double drop-D, DADGBD, making the G-run more difficult, but better suiting his words and melodies."

Jeff Harford, writing in the Otago Daily Times, reviewed Forrester's 2015–2017 solo material as follows: "For every nugget of truth in a great song, a corresponding seam of life experience is commonly found in its writer", and "Forrester brings a hatful of both to this Americana-folk release. The composer, novelist, poet, academic, and legal advocate for indigenous peoples takes a sideways step from his bluegrass past with the Rank Strangers to deliver a no-frills set that is, for the most part, nothing more than the man, his guitar and harmonica. That his ... originals sit comfortably alongside covers of Bob Dylan, Nanci Griffith and Gillian Welch songs says much about their strength."

Colin Morris, writing in Wellington's The Dominion Post, wrote that "Forrester is a damn fine guitar picker .. with an innate sense of rhythm coupled with fine lyrics and a story to tell. His Rosa Sharon is redolent of Johnny Cash singing Hurt."

In a 5-star review of Forrester's 2017 double CD, Jeshel, Mike Alexander of The Sunday Star-Times wrote: "There's something almost serendipitous about 'Jeshel' Forrester posting his latest album with little or no fanfare. He's one of those people you might meet only to find that beyond the lack of self-important promotion, his life's work, influence and achievements are those of someone who has already left a footprint (as an activist, academic, novelist, poet and musician). As a reference point only, Forrester evokes the ghosts of pre-electric Dylan, whose Girl of The North Country he covers, early Johnny Cash and the melodic sensibilities of Willie Nelson and Kris Kristofferson. ... Forrester's music is simple and down-to-earth, just straightforward honesty. What surprises is that there are no swines among these 25 pearls."

James Belfield in the New Zealand Listener described Jeshel as a "stunning double album of country folk", with "relentless storytelling skills" – the "easy acoustic strum and fingerpicking drift behind a clear, authoritative voice that tells outlaw country tales the equal of those by Waylon Jennings, Kris Kristofferson, Willie Nelson and Johnny Cash."

NZ Musician described the 2017 album Jeshel as "packed with well-written and performed songs", and noted that "Forrester has had an intriguing career in and out of the music industry, recording country albums in Australia in the mid-1980s, both as a solo artist and as part of the award-winning Rank Strangers." NZ Musician described Forrester's solo compositions as "lovely" and "surprisingly complex."

An article in the Sunday Star-Times praised the "sparseness and emotional directness of the storytelling on the exquisite Jeshel", and stated that the songs "mesmerisingly weave their own stories."

The Sunday Star-Times rated The Old Churchyard as a 4.5-star album (out of 5), stating that "Forrester is a throwback, in the most respectful way, to a time when songwriters had something to say and were armed with just an acoustic guitar and a suitcase full of songs. Think early Bob Dylan or Johnny Cash and a smattering of Glen Campbell or Jim Croce. ... What makes Forrester so compelling is, aside from some beautifully accomplished guitar work, that he possess a voice that is melodic, warm and fragile."

NZ Musician magazine declared that The Old Churchyard was "in the same vein as late-career Johnny Cash – bare bones recordings of a bared heart."

In 2018, Forrester joined with Talei Shirley to form The Dunning-Kruger Effect, an acoustic duo, which recorded the album, "... and with no craven." The album features historical songs from ancient England, Ireland, Scotland, and Scandinavia, as well as idiosyncratic versions of more recent folk songs. Mike Byrne of the McLeod Newsletter described "... and with no craven" as "melancholic and elegiac."

== Literature ==
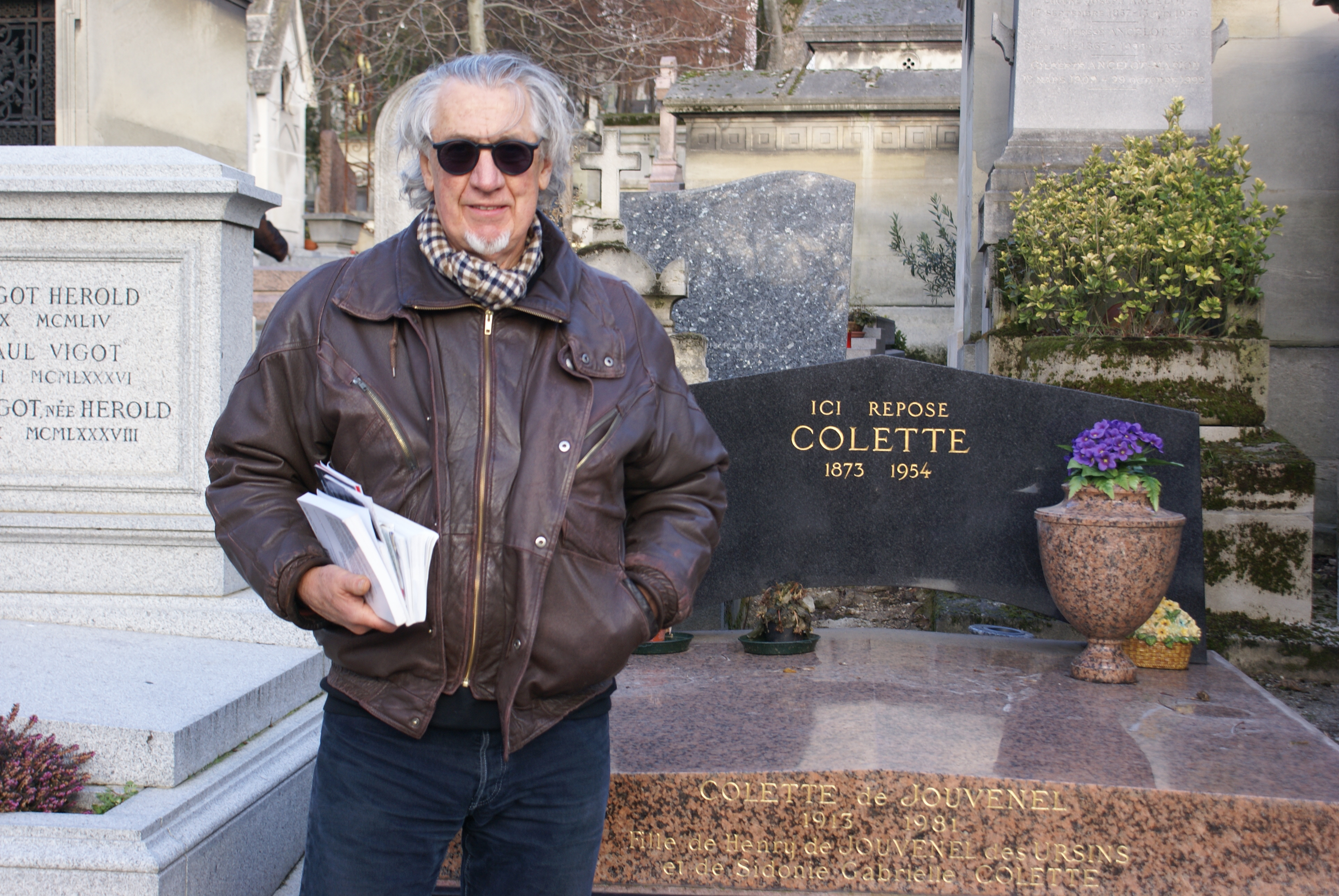
Forrester at the tomb of French novelist Sidonie-Gabrielle Colette, Cimetière du Père-Lachaise, Paris, 2012

Following the demise of the Rank Strangers in the 1990s, Forrester turned to writing novels and poetry, with a focus on music and family. The St. Louis Post-Dispatch found his first novel, Houseboating in the Ozarks, idiosyncratic but engaging.

His second novel, The Connoisseur of Love, was published in New Zealand in 2012.

FishHead: Wellington's Magazine described The Connoisseur of Love as a "comprehensive love song" to New Zealand's capital city, which "exudes Wellington." According to FishHead, "it's not just a novel about Wellington, it's a novel for Wellington." A review in the Emerging Writers Network declared Connoisseur to be "smartly written in Forrester's straightforward clear sentences which have always had the echo of Vonnegut".

A lengthy extract from his third novel, Begotten, Not Made, was published in 2007 by the University of Nebraska Press, in Scoring from Second, an anthology featuring the works of "thirty accomplished writers" from North America, including Michael Chabon, Andre Dubus, and others. Begotten, Not Made is written "entirely in free verse in the voice of a demented Brer Rabbit."

Forrester's fourth novel, More Deaths than One, was published in 2014 in a special edition of The Legal Studies Forum. According to the New Zealand writer and poet Jillian Sullivan, More Deaths than One "is amazing; so beautifully cadenced and such clear, intelligent writing. It reads like a classic. It is one man's honest and vulnerable take on life (and an intelligent, educated, thoughtful take)."

Poems from Forrester's 2009 New Zealand book of verse, The Beautiful Daughters of Men: A Novella in Short Verse from Tinakori Hill, have appeared in the South Dakota Review, Poetry New Zealand, JAAM (Just Another Art Movement), the Earl of Seacliffe Art Workshop, and Voyagers: A New Zealand Science Fiction Poetry Anthology. The complete poems were published in January 2009, in The Legal Studies Forum.

In 2011, Forrester's initial memoir, Blaw, Hunter, Blaw Thy Horn, was published in America. In reviewing the book, the Quincy Herald-Whig noted the groundbreaking work by Forrester's father, Coach Harry Forrester, in support of racial justice during the 1950s at Quincy College: "Harry Forrester did not spend much time in Quincy, but it's safe to say his impact will be remembered forever".

Forrester's story "A Kilgore Trout Moment" appeared in The Legal Studies Forum in 2010. In 2012, Forrester's story "Tulips" was also featured in The Legal Studies Forum.

In 2019, Forrester's book Dave Thorp as Metaphor, a history of Rotorua's McLeods bookstore, was published by McLeods Booksellers.

In 2023, Forrester's biography of Philip F. Deaver, One Dog Barked, the Other Howled: A Meditation on Several Lives of a Minor American Writer, was published by Hardie Grant Books with the following description: "Philip F. Deaver’s writing won America’s Flannery O’Connor and O. Henry awards. For 20 years, he was the writer-in-residence and creative writing professor at Florida’s prestigious Rollins College, until frontotemporal degeneration (FTD) robbed him of his ability to write or speak."

In 2026, his volume of poetry, The Ancient Light of the Dead, was published by Hardie Grant Books; the book was described as "a lyrical collection of poetic portraits drawn from a lifetime of encounters across continents. Through vivid, fragmentary glimpses of ordinary and extraordinary lives, these poems explore memory, mortality, and the shared human journey."

== Representation of US Indian tribes ==
Forrester, a descendant (on his mother's side) of Cherokee tribal members and Appalachian Melungeons, learned bluegrass music in the early 1980s from two members of the Lakota tribe, Cheeto Mestes (1928–2018) and Mervin Frazier (1935–2012), while defending Indian tribal rights in South Dakota. During these years, while living on the Cheyenne River Indian Reservation in Eagle Butte, South Dakota, he also advised members of the American Indian Movement, including activist Kenny Kane and others, and assisted Lakota clients, including Kane, Russell Means, Madonna Thunder Hawk, and spiritual leader Sidney Uses Knife Keith prepare for interviews and participation in Peter Matthiessen's landmark 1983 book, In the Spirit of Crazy Horse.

As director of the Native American Program for Oregon Legal Services (NAPOLS) in the mid-1980s, he represented several American Indian tribes, notably as tribal attorney assisting the Confederated Tribes of the Grand Ronde Community of Oregon and the Klamath Tribes before the United States Congress in securing federal legislation restoring treaty rights following generations of "termination." In advocating before Congress for the restoration of these tribal governments, he worked with activist (and later Congresswoman) Elizabeth Furse, tribal leaders Kathryn Jones Harrison (Grand Ronde) and Charles Kimbol (Klamath), Congressman Les AuCoin, and Senators Mark Hatfield and Ted Kennedy.

Forrester represented Indian clients in a number of litigated cases. He also argued successfully before Judges Richard Posner, Diane Wood, and Daniel Anthony Manion in the United States Court of Appeals for the Seventh Circuit in Cavalieri v. Shepard, establishing that where the police were "deliberately indifferent" to a prisoner's health and safety, they had violated his constitutional rights. Following the Seventh Circuit's decision, Forrester successfully opposed the writ of certiorari filed on behalf of the police in the U.S. Supreme Court.

His 1990 text Digest of American Indian Law: Cases and Chronology (republished in 2012 by William S. Hein & Co. as part of its online American Indian Library) derived from his Oregon lectures at the Northwestern School of Law in Portland. He also taught law at the University of Melbourne, the University of Illinois in Champaign-Urbana, Deakin University, and Victoria University of Wellington, and wrote extensively on indigenous rights and other matters.

Forrester was given the honorary Lakota name "Jeshel" (meaning both "meadowlark" and "messenger") following an unusual incident at a sundance in Green Grass, South Dakota, in the summer of 1981.

== Life ==
The Rank Strangers Bluegrass Band, Australia 1990

Forrester was born in Decatur, Illinois, "the soy-bean capital of the world." He grew up in Effingham, Quincy, and Tuscola in central Illinois, but spent most of his adult life overseas.

After graduating from Tuscola High School in 1964, Forrester became a conscientious objector and anti-war activist during the Vietnam War, and performed alternative volunteer service in the Peace Corps teaching mathematics in Guyana, South America.

Following a BSc degree in mathematics, Forrester was awarded a Master of Arts degree in English Literature He then obtained a Juris Doctor degree from the University of Illinois College of Law, where he served as an editor on the law review. He worked for Judge Henry Seiler Wise as a law clerk in the U.S. District Court for the Eastern District of Illinois, before emigrating to Australia where he taught at the University of Melbourne and befriended Aboriginal leader Brian Kamara Willis in Alice Springs. Through Kamara Willis, Forrester became interested in the rights of indigenous peoples, and left Australia in 1980 to work on Indian reservations in the states of South Dakota and Oregon in the USA. (The album Kamara is dedicated to the memory of Kamara Willis.) In 1984 he joined Oregon native Mindy Leek in supporting the final presidential campaign of South Dakota's Senator George McGovern.

Upon the successful restoration of Oregon's Grand Ronde and Klamath tribes, Forrester wrote his book on Indian law and returned to Australia to form the Rank Strangers and represent Aboriginal clients and others. He was also politically active, advising Australian Democrats leaders Senator Don Chipp and Senator Janine Haines in regard to the Aboriginal Affairs portfolio and the Democrats' successful campaign to save the Franklin River in Tasmania.

Throughout the 1990s, with the assistance of international WWOOFERS ("Willing Workers on Organic Farms"), Forrester (a vegetarian) and his family (including six children) operated a communal 80-acre (320,000 m^{2}) organic farm in an Australian eucalypt forest in the Shire of Hepburn, Victoria, based on principles developed by permaculture designer and fellow Shire of Hepburn resident David Holmgren. During this time, he also worked with Father Bob Maguire on behalf of homeless children in Melbourne, studied theology under Veronica Lawson RSM at the Australian Catholic University, lectured in law at Deakin University (1991–92), and wrote weekly newspaper columns in Central Victoria.

In 2000, Forrester accepted a professorship at the Law School of the University of Illinois. In 2006, following the completion of his first two novels and several years of anti-war protests against the USA's invasion of Iraq, he left America to live on Tinakori Hill in Wellington, New Zealand, where he wrote the poems collected in The Beautiful Daughters of Men, his memoir Blaw, Hunter, Blaw Thy Horn, and his Wellington novels, The Connoisseur of Love and More Deaths than One.

From 2007 to 2016, he served as a Teaching Fellow at Victoria University of Wellington, lecturing in ethics, contract law, and writing. He also provided legal advice and representation to the Wellington Community Law Centre and various public service organizations.

In 2024–2025, Forrester taught literature at Batumi Shota Rustaveli State University in the Transcaucasian country of Georgia. His position with Batumi Shota Rustaveli State University was undertaken as a Peace Corps Volunteer, 55 years after he first served in the Peace Corps in Guyana, South America, in the 1960s; at the age of 78, he became one of the oldest volunteers ever to serve in the Peace Corps' 62-year history.

== Australia's longest-running defamation suit ==
In 1990, Forrester led a group of eleven public service colleagues in mounting legal and political challenges to improprieties and mismanagement within the State of Victoria's accident compensation scheme, known at the time as "WorkCare." Approximately 25 court cases were lodged, based on allegations of racism, workplace espionage by WorkCare's fraud investigations unit, and other improprieties. Following airing of these grievances in the Victorian parliament on 29 March 1990, and a nationally screened report by ABC television on 31 July 1990, the management of Victoria's Accident Compensation Commission (ACC) mounted Australia's longest-running defamation case, against the ABC, in Victoria's Supreme Court.

Victoria's State Ombudsman found that an ACC general manager had ordered one of his fraud investigators, Gary Mutimer, to spy on the ACC's chairman Professor Ronald Sackville. Spy operations were also carried out against John Halfpenny, secretary of the Victorian Trades Hall Council, an ex-offico member of the ACC board.

Following repeated urgings by Supreme Court Justice David Byrne, the ACC/ABC defamation case eventually settled on 28 March 1992, when the ABC issued an "apology" to the ACC's former managing director and two other managers. However, the ABC declined to pay any financial compensation to the three, and the ABC's chairman, David Hill, told the Australian Senate that the apology was simply a "commercial decision." The case had cost the taxpayers of Victoria over two million dollars in legal costs.

In separate litigation in the Federal Court of Australia, Forrester was awarded a six-figure settlement by the ACC in November 1992. In a case before the Equal Opportunity Board, Forrester's colleague, African-born lawyer Dr. Nii Wallace-Bruce, received $33,000 in costs in July 1991, in the course of settling his claims of racism and other improprieties. Gary Mutimer was awarded compensation for stress caused by being required to carry out improper surveillance operations on Professor Sackville. The ACC general manager who had ordered the spying operations submitted his resignation from ACC in March 1990. On 25 July 1991, the ACC's managing director was removed from office by Victoria's State Government.

== Selected bibliography ==
- The Ancient Light of the Dead. Hardie Grant Books. 2026. ISBN 9781761453311.
- One Dog Barked, the Other Howled: A Meditation on Several Lives of a Minor American Writer. Hardie Grant Books. 2023. ISBN 9781761450525.
- The Connoisseur of Love. Steele Roberts. 2012. ISBN 978-1-877577-72-7.
- Houseboating in the Ozarks. Dufour Editions. 2006. ISBN 978-0-8023-1341-6.
- Blaw, Hunter, Blaw Thy Horn. Mayhaven Publishing, Inc. 2011. ISBN 978-1-932278-68-2.
- Dave Thorp as Metaphor. McLeods Booksellers Ltd. 2019. ISBN 978-0-473491-00-0.
- Digest of American Indian Law: Cases and Chronology. Fred B. Rothman & Co. 1990. ISBN 0-8377-0684-X. (with H. Barry Holt); republished in 2012 by William S. Hein & Co. as part of its online American Indian Library (https://www.wshein.com/; https://www.wshein.com/blog/).
- More Deaths than One (novel). The Legal Studies Forum, Volume XXXVIII, No. 2, West Virginia University (2014) (special edition).
- "Begotten, Not Made" (excerpt from novel), in: Philip F. Deaver, ed. (2007). Scoring from Second: Writers on Baseball. University of Nebraska Press. ISBN 978-0-8032-5991-1.
- "The Beautiful Daughters of Men: A Novella in Short Verse from Tinakori Hill." The Legal Studies Forum, Volume XXXIII, Supplement No. 2, West Virginia University (2009), ISSN 0894-5993 (a journal established by the American Legal Studies Association to promote humanistic, critical, trans-disciplinary writing, and featuring works of poetry, essays, memoirs, stories, and criticism).
- "A Kilgore Trout Moment" (story). The Legal Studies Forum, Volume XXXIV, No. 2, West Virginia University (2010), ISSN 0894-5993.
- "Tulips" (story). The Legal Studies Forum, Volume XXXV, West Virginia University (2012), ISSN 0894-5993.

== Selected discography ==
Forrester with Bill Monroe, Owensboro, Kentucky, 1990

Forrester with Ralph Stanley on the banks of the Ohio River, Owensboro, Kentucky, 1990

Albums

- Dust on the Bible. RCA (Nicholls and Dimes) (1988) (finalist, Australian Country Music Awards).

Back in Illinois
Jesus Is a Travelling Man (best vocalist, Australian Gospel Music Awards)
Hannah Cried
Dust on the Bible
A Hundred Miles an Hour to the Throne
Singing in the Family Circle
Matthew Chapter Three (best song, Australian Gospel Music Awards)
Elva
Greater Country 3UZ
Seventh Heaven (final five, "Best New Talent", Australia Country Music Awards)

- Uluru. Larrikin Records (Australia) (1989) (finalist, Australian Country Music Awards).

Uluru (final five for song of the year, Australian Country Music Awards – based on the trial of Lindy and Michael Chamberlain)
TV Preacher
Grampa Grundy
JFK
Two Dollar Bill (a/k/a "Long Journey Home")
Alma Rose
Mekong
King O'Malley
Take Me Home
Ice in Her Veins
Rain and Snow (written by Dock Boggs)
Talking in Tongues

- Kamara. Troubadour Records (Australia) (1990).

Love Please Come Home (written by Bill Monroe)
Kamara (based on the life of Aboriginal leader Brian Kamara Willis)
White Freight Liner (written by Townes Van Zandt)
East Virginia Blues (trad.)
Walking at Midnight
You've Got a Lover (written by Ricky Skaggs)
Come Home Angeline
Nella Dan (based on the story of the great Australian explorer ship)
Catfish John (written by Bob McDill and Alan Reynolds)
Ross River Fever
Rose Anne's Getting Married Today
Glendale Train (written by John Dawson)
Memories of Mother and Dad (written by Bill Monroe)

- Alma Rose. Te Ahumairangi Studios (New Zealand) (2015) (https://garyforrestermusic.bandcamp.com/album/alma-rose).

Black Top Road
Rosa Sharon
Love at the Five & Dime (written by Nanci Griffith)
Careless
Koori Man
Anathea (traditional with new lyrics)
Lay Me Down
Eyes of Stone
Oliver Eastman
Weathergirl
Seeing Double
Girl of the North Country (written by Bob Dylan)
Scarlet Town (written by Gillian Welch)
Kamara
Alma Rose

- Jeshel. Te Ahumairangi Studios (New Zealand) (2016)

Rest for the Weary
Hoka Hey
Hannah Cried
Wide River to Cross (written by Buddy Miller and Julie Anne Miller)
Maurita Cortez
Selma's Waltz
The House Carpenter (traditional)
The Ballad of Polly Kincaid
Annabelle (written by Gillian Welch)
Blue Eyed Boy

- The Old Churchyard. Sonorous Circle Studio (New Zealand) (2018)

Raylene
Sally Corn
Joseph
Lester
Amy Winehouse
Maude Gonne (words by W. B. Yeats, re-arranged)
Sam and Leo
Danny (words by R. Kipling)
The Old Churchyard (Traditional)

- ... and with no craven, by The Dunning-Kruger Effect (Talei Shirley and "Jeshel" Forrester). Sonorous Circle Studio (New Zealand) (2018) (https://thedunning-krugereffect.bandcamp.com/releases)

Bonnie George Campbell (16th century Scottish ballad)
Can You Hear Me? (written by Justin Walshe)
Stand By Me (written by Ben E. King)
Little Bird (written by Lisa Hannigan)
The Death of Queen Jane (16th century English ballad)
Donal Og (8th century Irish ballad)
I Will Follow You into the Dark (written by Ben Gibbard)
Earl Brand (15th century Scandinavian ballad)
Boots of Spanish Leather (written by Bob Dylan)

- The Covid Phone Album. Sonorous Circle Studio (New Zealand) (2020) (https://jeshelforrester.bandcamp.com)

Death of My Father
Answered Prayer
Reverie
Reckoning
The Ballad of Dylan Thomas and Liz Reitell
The Town of Kilcullen
Wayfaring Stranger (Traditional)
Daughter
Thelma
Woke
The Natural Kind
Cheeto Mestes
After the Gold Rush (written by Neil Young)

Composite Albums

- That's Australia. Larrikin Records (Australia) (1988) (composite album produced by ABC Television).
- Music Deli. Larrikin Records (Australia), Larrikin LRF 227 (1988) (composite album of music "borrowing from different traditions and creating new forms").
- Give Me a Home Among the Gum Trees. Larrikin Records, 1996.
