= Exquisite Stereo =

Studio album by Deborah Conway
- Released: May 2000
- Recorded: Studios 301, Sydney
- Genre: Alternative rock
- Label: Another Intercrops Production/ Shock Records

Deborah Conway chronology
My Third Husband (1997)	Exquisite Stereo (2000)	PC: The Songs of Patsy Cline (2001)

Singles from Exquisite Stereo
- 1. "Radio Loves This" Released: 2000; 2. "She's Coming for It" Released: 2000; 3. "Exquisite Stereo" Released: 2001

"Exquisite Stereo" is the fourth studio album by Australia rock singer-songwriter and guitarist, Deborah Conway. The album was released in May 2000 via Another Intercrops Production and distributed independently through Shock Records. The album features adventurous, sometimes subversive arrangements.

In a 2010 interview, Conway said; "My Third Husband and Exquisite Stereo had a relationship that was intricately connected. My Third Husband was such a “production in a box.” It barely involved any live musicians. We used some in the end, but the album was mostly designed before that. With Exquisite Stereo, we took the exact opposite approach."

== Critical reception ==
Juice Magazine gave the album 7 out of 10. It was Shaun Carney from The Green Guide's album of the week. Australian Women’s Forum gave it 4 out of 4, saying; "It’s been a long time between hits for Deborah Conway, but this CD deserves more than just critical acclaim. Yes, it is exqusite stereo – Conway’s voice is brilliant and she’s somehow ended up with all the passion that Mariah Carey and Celine Dion had surgically removed. “Radio Loves This” is a stand-out track that radio, surely, will have to love."

== Track listing ==
1. "Interzone"
2. "Exquisite Stereo" (featuring Neil Finn)
3. "Radio Loves This"
4. "Novocaine"
5. "You Come to Earth"
6. "She's Coming For It"
7. "So Sweet"
8. "The Freeway is Falling"
9. "Never Far Away"
10. "I Lay My Head Down on My Pillow and I Cried All Night"
11. "Pass the Sugar"
12. "Dust to Dust"
- all tracks written by Deborah Conway and Willy Zygier
