= Bouncing Czecks =

- Origin: United Kingdom
- Genres: Pop
- Labels: RCA Records

The Bouncing Czecks were a British male vocal/instrumental cabaret group, made up of Ricky Piper (vocals), Brian Bowles (guitar), Richard Lee (double bass), Gerry Hale (violin) and Warren Wills (piano). Their one chart success was a novelty single called "I'm a Little Christmas Cracker" in the UK Singles Chart, featuring Charlene Ducall on vocals. It was released on the RCA label, entered the chart on 29 December 1984, and peaked at number 72; it was in the chart for one week.

They toured Australia in 1983, playing at the Last Laugh Theatre Restaurant. Ricky Piper went on to perform several roles with Bell Shakespeare Company in Australia.
