= Deborah Conway =

Australian rock musician (born 1959)

Deborah Conway AM
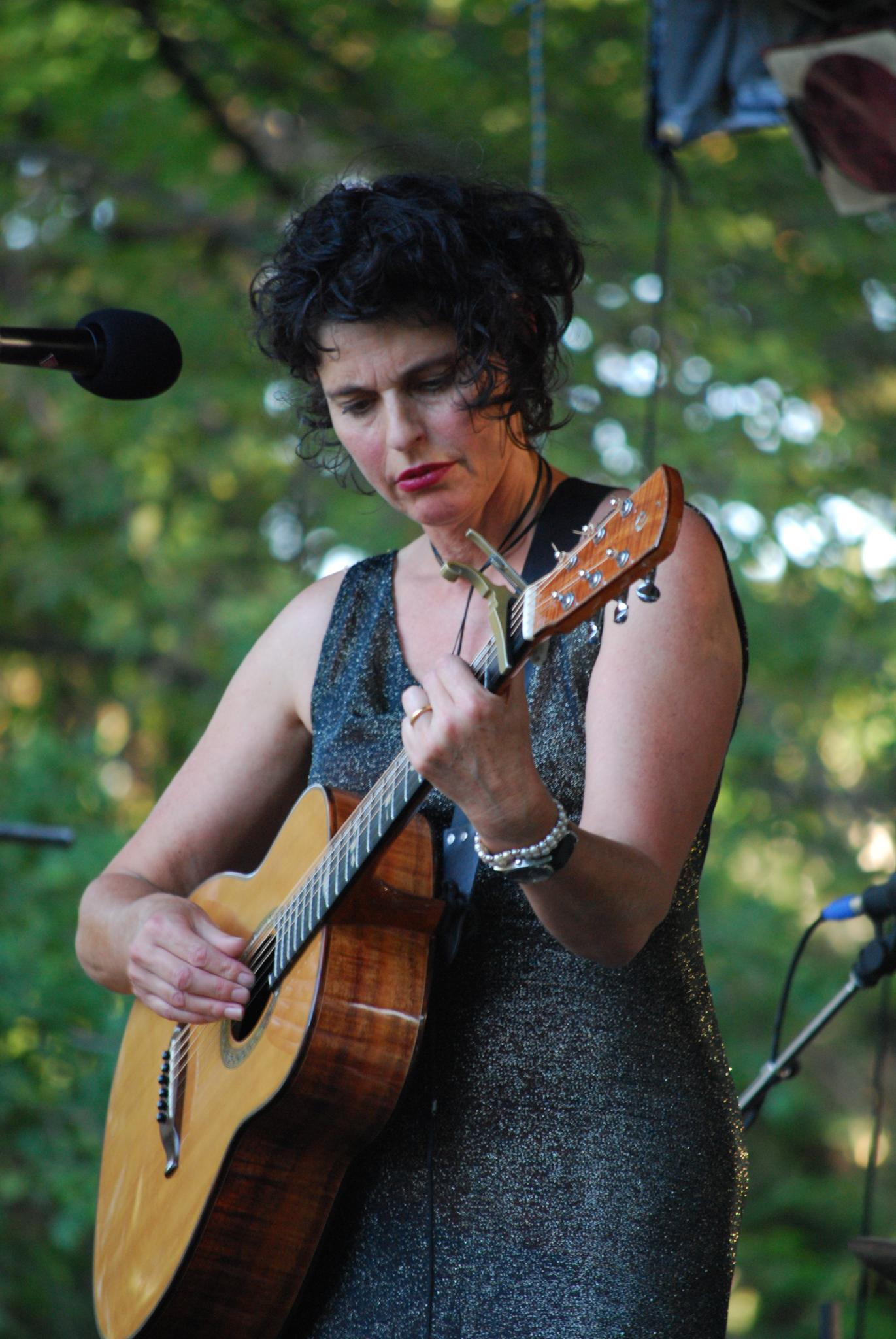
- Conway performing at Fitzroy Gardens in January 2010

Background information
- Also known as: DC
- Born: Deborah Ann Conway; 8 August 1959 (age 67); Melbourne, Victoria, Australia
- Genres: Rock; pop; country
- Occupations: Singer; musician; songwriter; model; actress; record producer
- Instruments: Vocals; guitar
- Years active: 1979–present
- Labels: Virgin; Mushroom; Shock; Another Intercorps
- Formerly of: The Benders; Do-Ré-Mi; Ultrasound
- Website: www.deborahconway.com

Deborah Ann Conway (born 8 August 1959) is an Australian rock singer-songwriter and guitarist, and had a career as a model and actress. She was a founding member of the 1980s rock band Do-Ré-Mi with their top-5 hit "Man Overboard".

Conway performs solo and has a top-20 hit single with "It's Only the Beginning" (1991). The associated album, String of Pearls, also peaked in the top 20. She won the ARIA Award for Best Female Artist at the 1992 awards. Her next album, Bitch Epic, reached the top 20 in November 1993. Conway organised and performed on the Broad Festivals from 2005 to 2008—show-casing contemporary Australian female artists.

== Early life and education ==
Deborah Ann Conway was born on 8 August 1959 in Melbourne, Victoria, to Jewish parents. Her father Carl (died 2011) was born in Leeds to a family that fled to England from Russia after the pogroms in the 1900s. Carl later changed his surname "Cohen" to "Conway" and moved to Australia, where he became a lawyer, entrepreneur, realtor and stockbroker in Toorak. Conway attended Lauriston Girls' School—photos of her as a schoolgirl were displayed at the Sydney Jewish Museum.

She started Media Studies at Royal Melbourne Institute of Technology (RMIT) but left in 1979. Next, she attended University of Melbourne for an arts degree with modelling and singing to support her way through. A billboard campaign for Bluegrass jeans featured Conway's nude backside and the phrase "Get yours into Bluegrass". Other ads with Conway as a model include Big M and Crunchie.

== Career ==
=== 1959–1980: Early years and The Benders ===
At the age of 18, Conway started playing guitar, and in 1980 she joined the Benders as a vocalist whilst still at university. Her father was so concerned when she joined the pop band that he sent her to a psychiatrist. Other members of The Benders included Neville Aresca (bass guitar), Les Barker (guitars, vocals), Dorland Bray (drums, vocals), John Campbell, Daniel Solowiej and Greg Thomas (guitar, keyboards). They performed mostly in Melbourne pubs playing original material—mostly written by Conway and Thomas as well as Blondie and Devo cover versions. Conway also wrote songs with Bray.

Conway had minor roles in the films Mallacoota Stampede (1979) and Hard Knocks (1980).

=== 1981–1991: Do-Ré-Mi to Rose Amongst Thorns ===
In 1981, Conway and Bray relocated to Sydney and formed pop rock band Do-Ré-Mi, with Helen Carter on bass guitar and Stephen Philip on guitar. They recorded two albums, Domestic Harmony (1985) and The Happiest Place in Town (1988), and eight singles. Their best performed hit, "Man Overboard", peaked at No. 5 on the Australia Kent Music Report Singles Chart and became the eighth-highest-positioned Australian song on the 1985 End of Year Chart. In the early 1980s, Conway was the domestic partner of Paul Hester, drummer for Deckchairs Overboard, Split Enz, and a founding member of Crowded House with whom he left Australia in 1985 to promote the band internationally, settling in Los Angeles to record there and undertake promotional touring of the United States.

Conway played the lead role of "Julie" in an Australian teenage road movie called Running on Empty, which was released in 1982.

In late 1983, Conway supplied vocals for actor Tracy Mann's singing in the ABC Television series Sweet and Sour (1984), including the hit title song, "Sweet and Sour". Two soundtrack albums and three singles from the series were credited to The Takeaways (and various artists). Conway sang lead vocals on half the songs and backing vocals on almost all the rest. She had a minor role, credited as Debbie Conway, in The Coca-Cola Kid (1985).

In 1986 Conway performed with The Rock Party, a charity project initiated by The National Campaign Against Drug Abuse, which included many Australasian musicians: Neil Finn, Eddie Rayner, Tim Finn, Nick Seymour and Hester (all from Crowded House); Geoff Stapleton, Robbie James and Mark Callaghan (all from GANGgajang); Reg Mombassa and Martin Plaza (both from Mental As Anything); Andrew Barnum and Lissa Barnum (Vitabeats); Mary Azzopardi (Rockmelons), Michael Barclay, Peter Blakeley, Jenny Morris, Danny De Costa, Greg Herbert (The Promise), Spencer P Jones, Sean Kelly (Models), John Kennedy, Paul Kelly, Robert Susz (Dynamic Hepnotics) and Rick Swinn (The Venetians). The Rock Party released a 12" single "Everything to Live For", which was produced by Joe Wissert, Phil Rigger and Phil Beazley.

Do-Ré-Mi disbanded in 1988 not long after their second album was released. Rolling Stone (Australia) named Conway 'Best Australian Female Singer' for that year.

While Do-Ré-Mi were working in England in 1988, Conway became involved in Pete Townshend's project The Iron Man: The Musical by Pete Townshend. Shortly afterwards she recorded an album of dance music in Los Angeles which was not released except for a solo single, a cover of Bad Company's "Feel Like Makin' Love" (1990), produced by Scott Cutler.

In 1990, Conway formed Drawcards as a semi-acoustic band with Vika and Linda, Stephen Cummings, Dror Erez, Tim Finn, Ross Hannaford, Peter Jones, Shane O'Mara and Chris Wilson. Almost immediately it split with half its members—Conway, Hester, Erez, Jones and Wilson—forming Rose Amongst Thorns as a pub rock band from 1990 to 1991.

=== 1991–1996: String of Pearls & Bitch Epic ===
In 1991, Conway played Juno in Peter Greenaway's Prospero's Books, singing a setting of William Shakespeare's masque from The Tempest to music by Michael Nyman.

Deborah Conway's debut solo album was released in October 1991, titled String of Pearls, which peaked at No. 20 on the ARIA Albums Chart. The album was produced by Richard Pleasance, Joe Hardy and Michael den Elzen. Singles from the album include "It's Only the Beginning" which reached No. 19 on the ARIA Singles Chart in August, "Under My Skin" (December) and "Release Me" (February 1992), all three of which were co-written with Scott Cutler. For her work on the album, she won ARIA Award for Best Female Artist at the ARIA Music Awards of 1992. To support the releases, Deborah Conway and the Mothers of Pearl was formed with Alan Harding (keyboards), Peter Jones (drums, ex-Drawcards and Rose Amongst Thorns), Bill McDonald (bass guitar) and Willy Zygier (guitar). Conway and Zygier became domestic partners and have written and performed much of Conway's subsequent material.

Conway released her second album Bitch Epic in 1993, which peaked at No. 18 and was produced by Jim Rondinelli and Zygier. The cover features an upper body shot of a topless Conway, covered in Nutella and cream, as she is about to eat a slice of cake thereby illustrating the concept of Gluttony for ABC TV mini-series Seven Deadly Sins (1993). Conway, Paul Kelly, Vika Bull and Renée Geyer provided vocals and song writing for the related soundtrack. An eight-track extended play of live songs was added to Bitch Epic to form 1994's Epic Theatre, which was produced by Zygier. Her backing band were Zygier, Harding, McDonald and Hughie Benjamin (ex-Yothu Yindi) on drums.

Ultrasound, an experimental band, with Conway, Zygier, McDonald and Hester, recorded and produced their self-titled album, Ultrasound (1995).

=== 1997–2003: My Third Husband to Only the Bones ===
Conway recorded a new album My Third Husband with Dave Anderson producing and, after returning to Australia in mid-1997, it was released in October 1997.

In May 2000, Conway released her fourth studio album, Exquisite Stereo, on Shock Records. Her backing band, Deborah Conway and the City of Women, was Zygier, Cameron Reynolds (samples), Edmond Amendola (bass guitar) and Dave Williams (drums)—the latter two are members of Augie March. This was much more of a rock record than previous releases, it "was a mature album featuring a wide variety of styles, from acoustic love song ("You Come to Earth") and Radiohead-styled epics ("Interzone") to full tilt rockers ("I Lay Down on My Pillow and Cried All Night")".

Following Exquisite Stereo, Conway played the lead role of Patsy Cline in the Australian stage production of Always... Patsy Cline and recorded a covers album of Cline's songs, called PC: The Songs of Patsy Cline (2001), which was produced by Zygier and Reynolds. She supported the release by touring as Deborah Conway and the Patsy Clones which contained Zygier and Reynolds, and Gerry Hale.

Only the Bones is Conway's compilation album which was released in 2002. The cover showed Conway at a table picking over a meal. The album was re-titled Definitive Collection, with a different cover, and re-released in 2004.

Conway performed Dreaming Transportation: Voice Portraits of the First Women of White Settlement at Port Jackson which was scripted and directed by Andrée Greenwell. The performance premiered at the Sydney Festival in 2003 and a year later was staged again, at the Sydney Opera House. Performing with Conway were Susan Prior, Christine Douglas, Amie McKenna and Jeannie Van de Velde and musicians, Hope Csuturos (violin), James Nightingale (clarinet, saxophone), Jane Williams (cello), Kim Poole (guitar/mandolin), Denise Papaluca (piano), Mardi Chillingworth (double bass) and Jared Underwood (percussion). The work was inspired by a series of poems by Jordie Albiston.

=== 2004–2016: Conway and Zygier ===
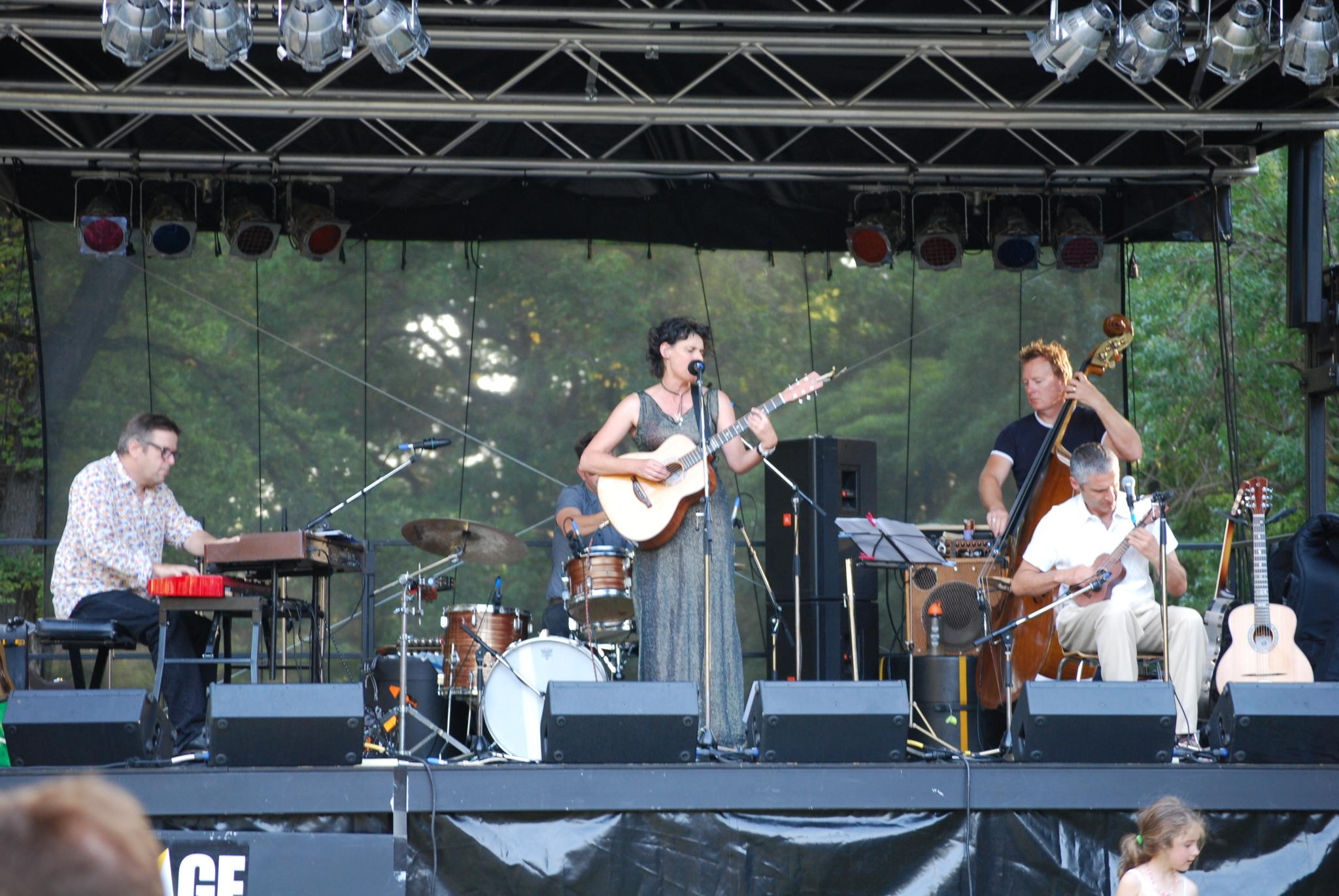
Deborah Conway & Willy Zygier, January 2010

In August 2004, Conway released Summertown, under the name of Conway and Zygier on the Another Intercorps label and was produced by Conway, Zygier and Hale. It has a 1960s folk-pop sound to it. Conway and Zygier supported sales by appearing in fans' homes. Brisbane group, george, recorded Do-Ré-Mi's hit single "Man Overboard", with Conway providing vocals, on their 2004 single "Still Real". Katie Noonan from george also performed with Conway in 2005. In 2005, Conway provided vocals for Man Bites God's single "Bride of the Dragon" from their album The Popular Alternative.

From 2005 to 2008, Conway collaborated with different female artists to tour Australia as part of the Broad Festival project. Each year's roster performed their own and each other's songs: Sara Storer, Katie Noonan, Ruby Hunter, Conway, and Clare Bowditch in 2005; Melinda Schneider, Mia Dyson, Kate Miller-Heidke, Conway, and Ella Hooper in 2006; Anne McCue, Sally Seltmann, Conway, Jade Macrae, and Abbe May in 2007; and Laura Jean, Elana Stone, Liz Stringer, Dianna Corcoran, and Conway in 2008.

In 2008, Conway was appointed artistic director of the Queensland Music Festival, which runs biennially in late July in odd-numbered years.

In May 2010, Conway and Zygier released Half Man Half Woman, which was produced by James Black (from stage band for RocKwiz) who also provided keyboards. The album included a track, "Into the Blue" recorded with Conway and Zygier joined by their three daughters, Syd, Alma and Hettie on vocals. The Age's Michael Dwyer observed that Conway and Zygier did not compromise, "from [Zygier's] jaunty Wes Montgomery-styled instrumental overture to a charming banjo lullaby featuring their three daughters, it fairly saunters with a relaxed resolve to be whatever it wants to be".

Stories of Ghosts, released in February 2013, explored Old Testament themes, and received positive reviews in the Australian music press.

In August 2016, Conway announced the release of her ninth studio album Everybody's Begging on 2 September 2016. The album is a collection of mainly acoustic songs about an unbeliever's take on Old Testament themes from a Jewish perspective. This was accompanied by a tour in August and September.

=== 2023: Book of Life ===
In September 2023, Conway and Zygier premiered their musical theatrical show, Songs From The Book of Life, at the Brisbane Festival, based on Conway's forthcoming memoir. On 3 October 2023, Conway published her memoir, Book of Life. It was shortlisted for the 2024 Nib Literary Award.

In August 2025, Conway and Zygier released the album Right Wing Propaganda.

== Portraits and other recognition ==
In 1996, a portrait of Conway as Medusa, painted by Rosemary Valadon, was a finalist in the Archibald Prize. The prize is awarded for the "best portrait painting preferentially of some man or woman distinguished in Art, Letters, Science or Politics".

A portrait of Conway by Lewis Miller was a finalist in the 2022 Archibald Prize.

== Personal life ==
Conway was in a relationship with Paul Hester before he moved to Los Angeles in 1985. Conway is married to guitarist and musical collaborator Willy Zygier. The pair had met in 1991 when Conway was vetting guitarists for her touring band, they formed a domestic partnership in that decade and married in 2007. As of September 2016, they have three adult daughters, Syd, Alma and Hettie, who are all musicians.

Conway identifies as a Zionist and a Jewish atheist. In a radio interview with ABC in 2023, she disputed the large number of children being killed by Israel: "It depends what you call kids. You see 16-, 17-year-olds, young boys, toting rifles. Unfortunately Hamas recruits boys that are not men yet," she said. In 2024 in the context of reactions to the Gaza war, Conway described her efforts to expose "the antisemitism among the 'good', the 'kind', the 'righteous', the 'educated' - people I never imagined would fall for it".

== Discography ==
=== Studio albums ===
List of studio albums, with selected chart positions and certifications
Title	Album details	Peak chart positions	Certifications
Title	Album details	AUS	Certifications
String of Pearls	Released: 14 October 1991; Label: Mushroom (D30601); Formats: CD, Cassette	20	ARIA: Gold
Bitch Epic	Released: 1 November 1993; Label: Mushroom (TVD91047); Formats: CD, CD+EP	18	ARIA: Gold
My Third Husband	Released: October 1997; Label: Mushroom (MUSH33055.2); Formats: CD	79	
Exquisite Stereo	Released: 2000; Label: Another Intercorps Production / Shock (SHOCK0399); Formats: CD	-	
PC: The Songs of Patsy Cline	Released: July 2001; Label: Another Intercorps Production; Formats: CD, DD	-	
Summertown (with Willy Zygier)	Released: August 2004; Label: Another Intercorps Production (INTERCORPS001); Formats: CD, DD	-	
Half Man Half Woman (with Willy Zygier)	Released: 3 May 2010; Label: Another Intercorps Production (INTERCORPS002); Formats: CD, DD	-	
Stories Of Ghosts (with Willy Zygier)	Released: 15 February 2013; Label: Another Intercorps Production (INTERCORPS004); Formats: CD, DD	-	
Everybody's Begging (with Willy Zygier)	Released: 2 September 2016; Label: Another Intercorps Production (INTERCORPS005); Formats: CD, DD, streaming	-	
The Words of Men (with Willy Zygier)	Released: 15 February 2019; Label: Another Intercorps Production (INTERCORPS006); Formats: CD, DD, streaming	-	
Right Wing Propaganda (with Willy Zygier)	Released: 8 August 2025; Label: Deborah Conway and Willy Zygier; Formats: CD, DD, streaming	-	

=== Soundtrack albums ===
List of soundtrack albums, with selected details
Title	Album details	Peak chart positions
Title	Album details	AUS
Seven Deadly Sins (with Paul Kelly, Vika and Linda, and Renée Geyer)	Released: February 1993; Label: Australian Broadcasting Corporation (514463-2)	71

=== Compilation albums ===
List of compilation albums, with selected details
Title	Album details
Only the Bones – Deborah Conway's Greatest Hits	Released: 17 July 2002; Label: Festival Mushroom Records (335282); Formats: CD, DD
The Definitive Collection	Released: 2004; Label: Festival Mushroom Records (337702); Formats: CD, DD

=== EPs ===
List of EPs, with selected details
Title	Album details
Epic Theatre	Released: 17 July 2002; Label: Mushroom (TVD93416); Formats: CD; Notes: This was released as a double CD pack with Bitch Epic

=== Singles ===
List of singles, with selected chart positions and certifications
Title	Year	Peak chart positions	Album
Title	Year	AUS	Album
"Feel Like Makin' Love"	1990	—	non-album single
"It's Only the Beginning"	1991	19	String of Pearls
"Under My Skin"	1991	34	String of Pearls
"Release Me"	1992	58	String of Pearls
"White Roses"	1992	87	String of Pearls
"He Can't Decide" (with Paul Kelly, Renee Geyer and Vika Bull)	1993	112	Seven Deadly Sins
"Alive and Brilliant"	1993	64	Bitch Epic
"Today I am a Daisy"	1994	98	Bitch Epic
"Consider This"/"Now That We're Apart"	1994	141	Bitch Epic
"Only the Bones (Will Show)"	1997	196	My Third Husband
"2001 Ultrasound"	1998	189	My Third Husband
"It's a Girl Thing"	1998	—	My Third Husband
"Happy New Year"	1999	—	non album single
"Radio Loves This"	2000	63	Exquisite Stereo
"She's Coming for It"	2000	—	Exquisite Stereo
"Exquisite Stereo"	2001	—	Exquisite Stereo
"Accidents Happen in the Home" (with Willy Zygier)	2004	—	Summertown
"Something's Right" (with Willy Zygier)|	2004		Summertown
"I Am Woman" (with Judith Lucy)	2015	—	non album single

=== Charity singles ===
List of charity singles
Title	Year	Peak chart positions	Notes
Title	Year	AUS	Notes
"I Touch Myself" (as part of the I Touch Myself Project)	2014	72	The I Touch Myself Project launched in 2014 with a mission to encourage young women to touch themselves regularly to find early signs of cancer.

== See also ==
- Do-Re-Mi (band)

== Awards and nominations ==
Conway was honoured as a Member of the Order of Australia in January 2020, "For significant service to the performing arts as a singer, songwriter and producer." In December 2022 she was inducted into the Music Victoria Hall of Fame.

=== ARIA Music Awards ===
The ARIA Music Awards is an annual awards ceremony that recognises excellence, innovation and achievement across all genres of Australian music. They Commenced in 1987.

Year	Nominee / work	Award	Result
1992	Strings of Pearls	Best Female Artist	Won
1992	Strings of Pearls	Album of the Year	Nominated
1992	Strings of Pearls	Best Cover Art	Nominated
1992	Strings of Pearls	Breakthrough Artist - Album	Nominated
1992	"It's Only the Beginning"	Single of the Year	Nominated
1992	"It's Only the Beginning"	Breakthrough Artist - Single	Nominated
1993	"Release Me"	Best Female Artist	Nominated
1994	Bitch Epic	Best Female Artist	Nominated
1994	Bitch Epic	Best Cover Art	Won

=== Australian Women in Music Awards ===
The Australian Women in Music Awards is an annual event that celebrates outstanding women in the Australian Music Industry who have made significant and lasting contributions in their chosen field. They commenced in 2018.

Year	Nominee / work	Award	Result	Ref.
2024	Deborah Conway	Lifetime Achievement Award	Nominated	

=== Countdown Music Awards ===
Countdown was an Australian pop music TV series on national broadcaster ABC-TV from 1974 to 1987, it presented music awards from 1979 to 1987, initially in conjunction with magazine TV Week. The TV Week / Countdown Awards were a combination of popular-voted and peer-voted awards.

Year	Nominee / work	Award	Result
1986	Deborah Conway in "Guns and Butter" by Do-Ré-Mi	Best Female Performance in a Video	Nominated

=== Don Banks Music Award ===
The Don Banks Music Award was established in 1984 to publicly honour a senior artist of high distinction who has made an outstanding and sustained contribution to music in Australia. It was founded by the Australia Council in honour of Don Banks, Australian composer, performer and the first chair of its music board.

Year	Nominee / work	Award	Result
2020	Deborah Conway	Don Banks Music Award	awarded

=== Helpmann Awards ===
The Helpmann Awards is an awards show, celebrating live entertainment and performing arts in Australia, presented by industry group Live Performance Australia since 2001. Note: 2020 and 2021 were cancelled due to the COVID-19 pandemic.

Year	Nominee / work	Award	Result	Ref.
2002	Deborah Conway - Always... Patsy Cline	Best Female Actor in a Musical	Nominated	
2017	Deborah Conway - The Beginning & The End (with Willy Zygier)	Best Australian Contemporary Concert	Nominated	

=== Music Victoria Awards ===
The Music Victoria Awards are an annual awards night celebrating Victorian music. They commenced in 2005.

Year	Nominee / work	Award	Result	Ref.
2022	Deborah Conway	Hall of Fame	inductee	

=== National Live Music Awards ===
The National Live Music Awards (NLMAs) are a broad recognition of Australia's diverse live industry, celebrating the success of the Australian live scene. The awards commenced in 2016.

Year	Nominee / work	Award	Result
2019	Deborah Conway	Live Legends (Hall of Fame)	inductee
