= Bitch Epic =

Studio album by Deborah Conway
- Released: November 1993
- Genre: Rock; pop; alternative rock
- Length: 47:27
- Label: Mushroom Records
- Producer: Jim Rondinelli; William Zygier

Deborah Conway chronology
Seven Deadly Sins (1993)	Bitch Epic (1993)	Epic Theatre (1994)

Singles from Bitch Epic
- 1. "Alive and Brilliant" Released: October 1993; 2. "Today I am a Daisy" Released: January 1994; 3. "Consider This / Now That We're Apart" Released: July 1994

Bitch Epic is the second studio album by Australia rock singer-songwriter and guitarist, Deborah Conway. The album was released in November 1993 and peaked at number 18 on the Australian ARIA Charts. This remains Conway's highest-charting album.

The cover art features Conway topless and covered in Nutella. According to Conway, the title comes from "random words, cut up and pulled from a hat".

At the ARIA Music Awards of 1994, the album was nominated for two awards, Best Cover Art and Best Female Artist, winning for Best Cover Art.

== Track listing ==
No.	Title	Writer(s)	Length
1.	"Alive and Brilliant"	Deborah Conway; Willy Zygier	4:04
2.	"I'm Not Satisfied"	Conway; Zygier	3:51
3.	"Consider This" (featuring Vika and Linda Bull)	Conway; Zygier	3:43
4.	"She Prefers Fire" (featuring Vika and Linda Bull)	Conway; Zygier	5:30
5.	"Today I am a Daisy"	Conway; Zygier	3:34
6.	"Now That Were Apart"	Conway; Zygier	3:56
7.	"World of Love" (featuring Christine Anu)	Conway; Zygier	4:33
8.	"Holes In the Road"	Conway; Zygier	4:23
9.	"One More Time" (featuring Vika and Linda Bull)	Conway	3:38
10.	"Only Girl"	Zygier	3:39
11.	"Madame Butterfly is In Trouble" (featuring Vika and Linda Bull)	Conway	4:28
12.	"Deborah Conway's Nightmare #348"	Conway	2:02

== Charts ==
Chart (1993/94)	Peak position
Australian Albums (ARIA)	18
New Zealand Albums (RMNZ)	39

== Certifications ==
Region	Certification	Certified units/sales
Australia (ARIA)	Gold	35,000^{^}
^{^} Shipments figures based on certification alone.
