= Release Me (Deborah Conway song) =

1992 single by Deborah Conway

Single by Deborah Conway

from the album String of Pearls
- B-side: "Will You Miss Me When You're Sober"; "In April"
- Released: 20 January 1992
- Recorded: Metropolis Audio (Melbourne, Australia)
- Label: Mushroom
- Songwriter(s): Deborah Conway; Scott Cutler
- Producer(s): Richard Pleasance

Deborah Conway singles chronology
"Under My Skin" (1991)	"Release Me" (1992)	"White Roses" (1992)

"Release Me" is a song by Australian singer-songwriter Deborah Conway. It was released as the third single from her debut studio album, String of Pearls (1991), in January 1992. It peaked at number 58 in Australia in the following month. In March 1992, Conway performed it with Vika and Linda at the ARIA Music Awards of 1992. Dan Condon of Double J, in 2019, rated it as one of seven great performances at the ARIA Awards over 33 years. At the ARIA Music Awards of 1993, the song earned Conway a nomination for Best Female Artist, losing to Lily by Wendy Matthews.

== Track listings ==
CD and cassette single

1. "Release Me"
2. "Will You Miss Me When You're Sober" (recorded for MCM Networking's 'Rocksat')
3. "In April" (recorded with Shane O'Mara)
4. "Release Me" (acoustic)

== Weekly charts ==
Chart (1992)	Peak position
Australia (ARIA)	58
