= It's Only the Beginning =

1991 single by Deborah Conway

- CD single cover

Single by Deborah Conway

from the album String of Pearls
- B-side: "Deborah Conway's Nightmare #347"
- Released: 27 May 1991
- Label: Mushroom
- Songwriter(s): Deborah Conway, Scott Cutler
- Producer(s): Richard Pleasance

Deborah Conway singles chronology
| "Feel Like Makin' Love" (1990) | "It's Only the Beginning" (1991) | "Under My Skin" (1991) |

"It's Only the Beginning" is a song by Australian singer-songwriter Deborah Conway. It was released as the first single from her debut studio album, String of Pearls (1991), and peaked at number 19 in Australia in August 1991. At the ARIA Music Awards of 1992, the song was nominated for four awards: Single of the Year and Song of the Year, losing out to Yothu Yindi's "Treaty", and Breakthrough Artist – Single, losing out to Baby Animals' "Early Warning", while Richard Pleasance was nominated for Producer of the Year but lost to Simon Hussey.

== Background ==
The song was written by Deborah Conway and American songwriter Scott Cutler. When the song was first completed, Conway said she felt "embarrassed", lamenting to her former Do-Re-Mi bandmate Dorland Bray: "It's so happy, I can't cope, what am I doing?". Together, they rewrote the song. "I tried to cloak it, disguise its happiness," Conway recalls, but she finally gave in to the joy of it. "The recorded version is the original lyric without the de-happifying of it."

== Track listings ==
7-inch, CD, and cassette single

1. "It's Only the Beginning"
2. "Deborah Conway's Nightmare #347"

== Charts ==
| Chart (1991) | Peak position |
|---|---|
| Australia (ARIA) | 19 |

== Cover versions ==
- Beccy Cole covered the song for her 2010 album Preloved.
