= My Shiralee =

Studio album by Broderick Smith
- Released: 1994
- Recorded: Newmarket Studios, North Melbourne
- Genre: Blues, country
- Length: 47:58
- Label: Newmarket
- Producer: The Guild

Broderick Smith chronology
Suitcase (1992)	My Shiralee (1994)	Songster (1995)

My Shiralee is a studio album by Australian blues and country musician, Broderick Smith, which was released in 1994 (see Music in 1994) on the Newmarket Music label. Smith provided lead vocals, harmonica and wrote lyrics for ten of the twelve tracks. His backing band included Tony Day on drums; Gerry Hale on mandolin, fiddle and autoharp; Michel Rose on pedal steel; and Matt Walker on acoustic guitar, dobro, lap steel. The Age's Mike Daly rated the album as one of his top ten releases of the year. A CD version of My Shiralee was issued in 1998.

== Track listing ==
All lyrics are written by Broderick Smith, unless otherwise indicated

No.	Title	Music	Length
1.	"My Shiralee"	Randy Bulpin	4:01
2.	"A Perfect World"	Matt Walker	5:43
3.	"Stella Joy"	Bulpin	4:12
4.	"Crystal"	Bulpin	2:49
5.	"All I Saw Was Blue"	Phil Hyde	3:52
6.	"Tonight a Star Was Born"	Nick Smith	3:28
7.	"No Sleep at the Cross" (Phil Hyde)	Hyde	3:48
8.	"A Storm Is Coming"	N Smith, R O'Connell	3:23
9.	"Tomorrow Wendy" (Andy Prieboy)	Prieboy	4:39
10.	"Stealing from the Devil's Garden"	Richard Pleasance	4:06
11.	"Holy Duty"	Hyde	3:16
12.	"Beulah River"	B Smith	4:08

== Personnel ==
My Shiralee by Broderick Smith is credited to:

Musicians

- Broderick Smith – vocals, harmonica
- Randy Bulpin – guitar, gut string guitar, slide guitar
- Tony Day – drums
- Robert B. Dillon – drums
- Gerry Hale – autoharp, mandolin, acoustic guitar, violin, banjo
- Phil Hyde – acoustic guitar, backing vocals
- Joe Imbroll – bass guitar
- Michael Rose – pedal steel
- Nick Smith – backing vocals
- Kirk Steele – accordion
- Matt Walker – lap steel, dobro

Recording details

- Producer – The Guild
- Engineer, mixer, digital master – Robert B. Dillon
- Recording studio – Newmarket Studios, North Melbourne, Victoria

Artwork

- Front cover photography – Vicki Bell
- Inside black & white photo of children – Brod's Dad
- Additional black & white photography – Tim Riches
- Man & boy shot – Mick O’Connor
- Design – Jane Ferrusi (Dex Audio)
