= Andy Metcalfe =

British musician (born 1956)

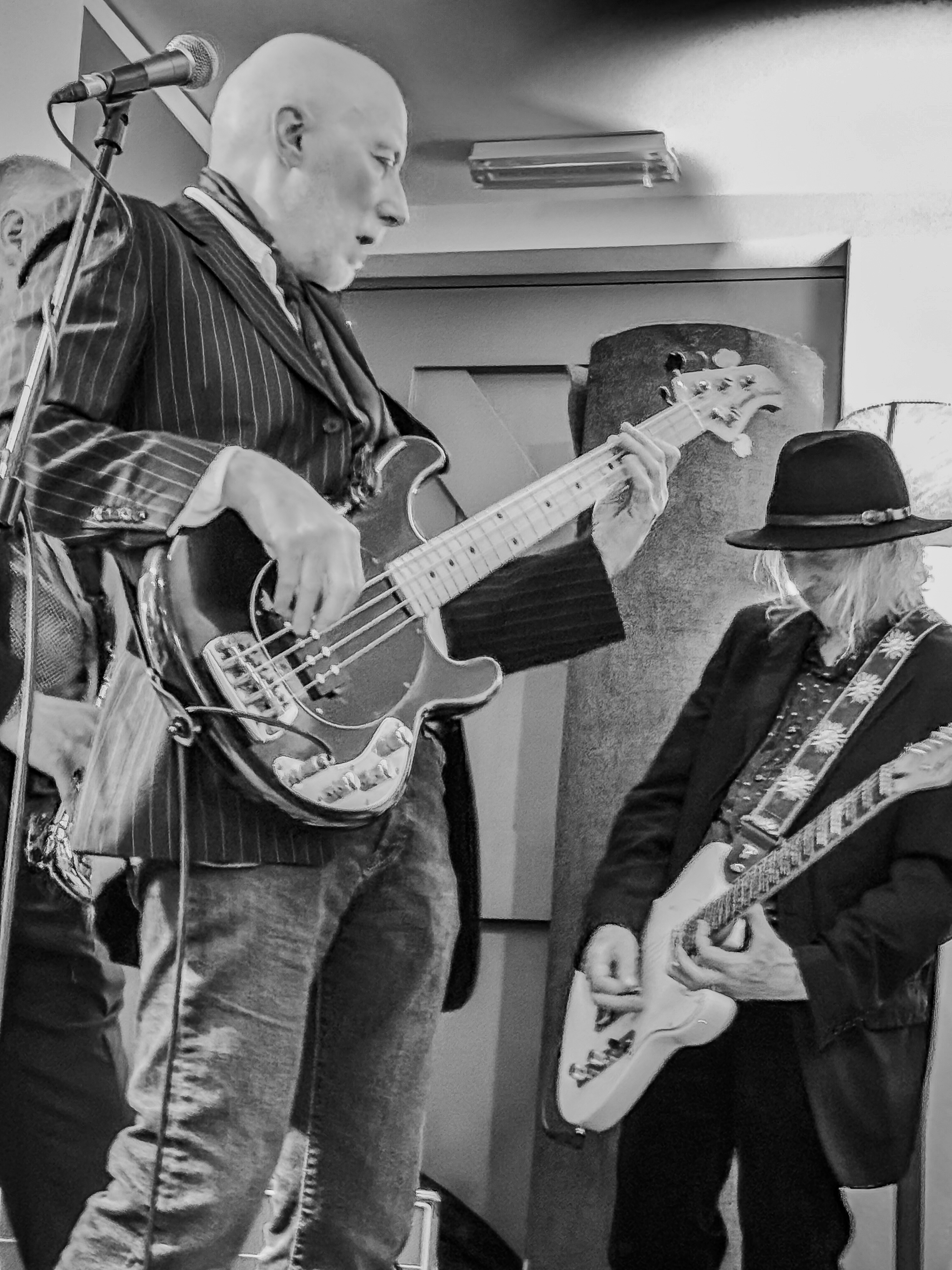
- Former Soft Boys Metcalfe & Kimberley Rew (2026) play together in Crediton, Devon

Background information
- Born: 3 March 1956 (age 70); Bristol, England
- Genres: Pop rock, new wave
- Occupations: Musician, producer
- Instruments: Bass, keyboards, guitar
- Years active: 1976–present

Andy Metcalfe (born 3 March 1956, Bristol, England) is an English bassist, keyboardist, and producer, who played mainly with The Soft Boys (with Robyn Hitchcock, 1976–1979), Robyn Hitchcock and the Egyptians (1984–1994), and with Squeeze off and on during the period 1985–1994.

He co-produced several of the Egyptians albums (Gotta Let This Hen Out!, Element of Light, Globe of Frogs and Queen Elvis), contributing guitars, keyboards and string arrangements along with his melodic bass lines. Since the break-up of the Egyptians, his production credits include Glenn Tilbrook, The Autumns, Terry Edwards, The Sugarplastic, Kimberley Rew, Plainsong, Julian Dawson, Clear, Jazz Passengers with Debbie Harry, Helen Roche; often playing bass and keyboards on the sessions. His guest appearances on albums include David Gray, Nick Harper, Tim Keegan and he was music director and keyboard player for Channel 4's Vic Reeves Big Night Out, also being a producer on Reeves' only album, I Will Cure You.

He occasionally appeared as a side man on tours, including with Peter Rowan in the UK playing accordion in 1981 and 1982, Sandie Shaw in Japan on keyboards in 1989, and Tasmin Archer also on keyboards in 1996.

Metcalfe played in Three Minute Tease – a trio with songwriter Anton Barbeau and fellow Soft Boys/Egyptians drummer Morris Windsor – and co-produced the band's debut album, Three Minute Tease, released in April 2012. In 2014, the trio released Bite The Hand, their second album. Metcalfe additionally appears on Barbeau's solo albums, including 2023's Morgenmusik / Nachtschlager. In 2024, Metcalfe appeared on Barbeau's single, "Bop".
