= The Soft Boys =

English psychedelic/folk-rock band led by Robyn Hitchcock

- From left to right: Kimberley Rew, Robyn Hitchcock, Matthew Seligman, and Morris Windsor

Background information
- Origin: Cambridge, England
- Genres: Post-punk; alternative rock; neo-psychedelia; new wave
- Years active: 1976–1981; 1994; 2001–2003
- Labels: Two Crabs; Armageddon; Matador
- Past members: Robyn Hitchcock; Morris Windsor; Andy Metcalfe; Rob Lamb; Alan Davies; Kimberley Rew; Matthew Seligman

The Soft Boys were an English rock band led by guitarist Robyn Hitchcock.

The band formed in 1976 in Cambridge, England and released two albums before disbanding in 1981. Though the Soft Boys’ initial career was brief, their style of psychedelic music and retro folk-rock had a big influence on the development of jangle pop, indie rock, and neo-psychedelia during the 1980s and beyond.

== Early band history ==
The Soft Boys formed in 1976 in Cambridge, England, initially calling themselves Dennis and the Experts. Their first lineup comprised Hitchcock on guitar, Rob Lamb (half-brother of radio host and author Charlie Gillett) on guitar, Andy Metcalfe on bass, and Morris Windsor on drums. Alan Davies replaced Lamb after only four gigs in late 1976, and Kimberley Rew eventually replaced Davies. It was this lineup of Hitchcock, Rew, Metcalfe, and Windsor that recorded the Soft Boys' debut album, A Can of Bees, released 1979.

Matthew Seligman replaced Metcalfe on bass in 1979. The band broke up in 1981 after the release of their second album, Underwater Moonlight.

== Post-Soft Boys and reunions ==
Rew formed the more mainstream pop group Katrina and the Waves. Hitchcock went on to a prolific career with a similar whimsical, surrealistic style. In 1984, he formed Robyn Hitchcock and the Egyptians with fellow Soft Boys Morris Windsor and Andy Metcalfe and went on to tour and record for ten years. They were briefly joined by Rew, Jim Melton and Seligman in a re-formed Soft Boys for a UK tour in 1994 to mark the release of a box set of their work. They briefly came together again in 2001 without Metcalfe for the 20th anniversary of Underwater Moonlight and the release of a new album, 2002’s Nextdoorland. They disbanded once again in 2003.

Seligman died in 2020 of complications from COVID-19.

== Circle Jerks cover ==
"I Wanna Destroy You" was later re-recorded by the Circle Jerks with backing vocals from pop singer/songwriter Deborah Gibson. This version appears in their compilation album Oddities, Abnormalities and Curiosities. The video for the song was also featured on an episode of Beavis and Butt-Head.

== Discography ==
=== Albums ===
- A Can of Bees (1979)
- Underwater Moonlight (1980)
- Nextdoorland (2002)

=== Compilation and live albums ===
- Two Halves for the Price of One (1981) (Studio rarities and live tracks)
- Live at the Portland Arms (cassette, 1983; LP, 1988)
- Invisible Hits (1983)
- Wading Through a Ventilator (EP) (1984) (Contains Give It To The Soft Boys EP, plus extra tracks)
- Raw Cuts (EP) (1989) (A retitled version of Wading Through a Ventilator)
- 1976-81 (2 CD) (1993) (Best-of, plus rarities, out-takes and live tracks)
- Where Are The Prawns (cassette, 1994)
- Underwater Moonlight... And How It Got There (2 CD) (2001) (Contains all of Underwater Moonlight, plus an additional disc of demos, rehearsals, and out-takes)

=== Singles and EPs ===
- Give It To The Soft Boys 7-inch EP: "Wading Through a Ventilator" b/w "The Face of Death" and "Hear My Brane" (1977)
- "(I Want to Be An) Anglepoise Lamp" b/w "Fatman's Son" (1978)
- Near the Soft Boys 7-inch EP: "Kingdom of Love" b/w "Vegetable Man" & "Strange" (1980)
- "I Wanna Destroy You" b/w "Old Pervert" (1980)
- "Only the Stones Remain" b/w "The Asking Tree" (1981)
- "Love Poisoning" (1982)
- "He's a Reptile" b/w "Song No. 4" (1983)
- "The Face of Death" b/w "The Yodelling Hoover" (1989)
- Side Three (CD EP) (2002)

An album financed by Radar Records was recorded at Rockfield Studios in 1978, at the same time Rush was recording Hemispheres there. The resultant album was never released, although one or two of the tracks have had subsequent release as part of compilations.
