= The Confuser =

Studio album by Robyn Hitchcock
- Released: 24 July 2026
- Recorded: October 2025 – unknown
- Studios: Alex the Great (Nashville, Tennessee); The Duck (Nashville, Tennessee)
- Genres: Psychedelic rock; jangle rock
- Length: 39:47
- Label: Tiny Ghost
- Producers: Brad Jones; Robyn Hitchcock

Robyn Hitchcock chronology
1967: Vacations in the Past (2024)	The Confuser (2026)

Singles from The Confuser
- 1. "I Am This Thing" Released: 27 March 2026; 2. "My Dead Astronaut" Released: 27 April 2026; 3. "How to Feel Alright" Released: 9 June 2026; 4. "Yesterday's Rain" Released: 7 July 2026

The Confuser is the twenty-fifth studio album by English singer-songwriter Robyn Hitchcock, released on 24 July 2026 through Tiny Ghost Records and produced by Brad Jones with Hitchcock. Led by the singles "I Am This Thing", "My Dead Astronaut", "How to Feel Alright", and "Yesterday's Rain", the album was met with very positive reception from critics and reached No. 60 on the UK Album Downloads Chart upon release. A main theme of the record revolves around the subject of life and death.

Described as psychedelic rock and jangle rock, the album was primarily recorded in Nashville, Tennessee, originally with Jones and a backing band consisting of Todd Bolden (bass), Jeremy Fetzer (guitar), and Eric Slick (drums). Further Nashville sessions were recorded with Jordan Lehning. Guest appearances include guitarist and former Soft Boys bandmate Kimberley Rew on five tracks and singer Gillian Welch on "Ghost in Sunlight".

== Background and recording ==
The Confuser is Hitchcock's fourth album in as many years, following Shufflemania! in 2022, the instrumental Life After Infinity in 2023, and 1967: Vacations in the Past, a covers album accompanying his memoir, in 2024. As such, it is his first set of original song-based material in nearly four years. Recording began in October 2025 at Alex the Great Recording in his home base of Nashville, Tennessee. The sessions lasted about two and a half days with producer Brad Jones and a Nashville-based backing band, consisting of Todd Bolden on bass, Jeremy Fetzer on guitar, and Eric Slick on drums.

Taking the advice of his wife Emma Swift, a singer-songwriter and the record's executive producer, Hitchcock sent a copy of the tapes to former Soft Boys bandmate Kimberley Rew, who overdubbed guitar and returned the recordings. Roughly a quarter of his contributions remained on the final product, ultimately appearing on half of the tracks. Swift also recommended that Hitchcock should continue working on the vocals. Additional sessions for the album took place at The Duck, also in Nashville, with Jordan Lehning, who produces for Swift. Singer and frequent collaborator Gillian Welch contributed vocals to the song "Ghost in Sunlight".

== Title ==
The title is in reference to a nickname given to him by his wife, Emma Swift. It is also a reference to the album The Convincer (2001) by Nick Lowe. Swift elaborated that people have often noted visual similarities between Hitchcock and Lowe, to the point that it has become a "running joke among fans" of both artists. In fact, Hitchcock told The Guardian that he is sometimes mistaken for Lowe whenever he is recognised in public.

== Composition ==
Critic have described the album musically as psychedelic rock, though Hitchcock himself described it as a "jangle-rock LP". While it was not constructed specifically as a concept album, a common theme that revolves throughout is the narrator's ruminations about life and death. The opener "I Am This Thing" begins with the line "I owe a lot to a dead man's cock", a reference to the novel Percy, which was written by Hitchcock's father and was subsequently adapted into a 1971 film that the Kinks provided the soundtrack to.

== Singles and release ==
On 27 March 2026, Hitchcock announced The Confuser and led it with the single "I Am This Thing" and an accompanying music video. "My Dead Astronaut" and "How to Feel Alright" respectively followed as singles on 27 April and 9 June. The final single in the lead-up to album, "Yesterday's Rain", was released on 7 July with a music video filmed in Nashville, Tennessee, and directed by Scott Jacobson, otherwise known as a comedy writer and for directing videos for artists such as the National, Nick Lowe, and Stephen Malkmus. Amongst the cast, Maria Bamford, David Herman, and Eugene Mirman have cameos.

The Confuser was released on 24 July 2026 through Tiny Ghost Records, a label operated by Hitchcock and his wife, Emma Swift. The album peaked on the UK Album Downloads Chart at No. 60.

== Critical reception ==
Professional ratings
Aggregate scores
Source	Rating
AnyDecentMusic?	7.9/10
Metacritic	86/100
Review scores
Source	Rating
AllMusic	4/5 stars
Clash	8/10
Classic Pop	4/5 stars
Classic Rock	4/5 stars
God Is in the TV	8/10
Louder Than War	4.5/5 stars
Mojo	4/5 stars
Record Collector	4/5 stars
Shindig!	4/5 stars
Uncut	9/10

According to the review aggregator Metacritic, The Confuser received "universal acclaim" based on a weighted average score of 86 out of 100 from six critic scores. Another aggregator, AnyDecentMusic?, gave it a weighted average score of 7.9 out of 10 from seven critic reviews.

In a four-star review for the magazine Classic Rock, David Quantick considered it to be Hitchcock's best album the 21st century thus far, with songs such as "I Am This Thing" and "How to Feel Alright" demonstrating his melodicism and lyricism at their best. Editors at AllMusic also rated the album four stars, with critic Mark Deming opining that while it may not quite reach the "heady joys" of Underwater Moonlight (1980), Hitchcock maintains the consistently high standard of quality he has set throughout his career, concluding that The Confuser "is the work of a legitimately great vocalist, guitarist, and songwriter who hasn't fallen into a rut or lost the plot".

== Track listing ==
All tracks are written by Robyn Hitchcock.

The Confuser track listing
No.	Title	Length
1.	"I Am This Thing"	2:35
2.	"My Dead Astronaut"	4:02
3.	"Yesterday's Rain"	3:55
4.	"Breathless"	4:40
5.	"Ghost in Sunlight"	4:51
6.	"Building from the Ruins"	5:25
7.	"The Vanishing Kind"	4:18
8.	"How to Feel Alright"	3:23
9.	"Monday for Me"	3:13
10.	"Wasted"	3:20
Total length:		39:47

== Personnel ==
Credits are adapted from the CD liner notes.

=== Musicians ===
- Robyn Hitchcock – vocals (all tracks), electric guitar (except 5), keyboards (5, 7), acoustic guitar (9)
- Eric Slick – drums (all tracks)
- Jeremy Fetzer – electric guitar (except 5), keyboards (4), percussion (7)
- Todd Bolden – bass (1–4, 6–8, 10)
- Brad Jones – keyboards (1, 6), upright bass (5)
- Jordan Lehning – keyboards (2, 4, 5, 7–10), bass (9)
- Kimberley Rew – electric guitar (3–6, 8)
- Gillian Welch – vocals (5)

=== Technical and design ===
- Brad Jones – production; recording and mixing at Alex the Great, Nashville, Tennessee
- Robyn Hitchcock – production
- Jordan Lehning – additional recording at The Duck, Nashville, Tennessee
- John Baldwin – mastering at Infrasonic Sound
- Fetzer Design – design, photography
- Emma Swift – executive producer

== Charts ==
Chart performance for The Confuser
Chart (2026)	Peak position
UK Album Downloads (Official Charts)	60
UK Folk Albums (Official Charts)	9
UK Independent Albums (Official Charts)	31
