= That Old Black Hole =

2011 single by Dr. Dog

Single by Dr. Dog

from the album Be the Void
- Released: November 29, 2011
- Recorded: 2011
- Studio: Meth Beach, Philadelphia, Pennsylvania
- Genre: Indie rock; roots rock
- Length: 3:21
- Label: Anti-
- Songwriters: Toby Leaman, Scott McMicken
- Producers: Dr. Dog, Nathan Sabatino

Music video
- "That Old Black Hole" on YouTube

"That Old Black Hole" is a song by the American indie rock band Dr. Dog from their seventh album Be the Void (2012). The song was recorded at Meth Beach in Philadelphia, and released on November 29, 2011 by Anti-.

== Music video ==
The music video for "That Old Black Hole" was directed by George Salisbury and released in January 2012. The video shows Dr. Dog performing the song in a studio, with frequent changes in costumes, arrangements and camera perspectives. Salisbury said the video was filmed over two days and involved 144 complete takes of the song. He described the process as "exhausting", with the intense performance intended to capture the disorienting quality of the song and its lyrics.

== Reception ==
Written by Stereogum praised "That Old Black Hole" for its catchy rock sound and vintage feel. American Songwriter pointed to the song's quick pace and rootsy sound. Pitchfork criticized the lyrics for being too clever and hard to follow.

The Phoenix included the song among the album's guitar-heavy tracks. It also pointed to the strange lyrics and the bursts of noise heard throughout the song. Paste described the song as combining jam-oriented hand drums and a psychedelic soundscape with Scott McMicken's vocals, calling the result characteristic of the band's sound.

== Personnel ==
Credits adapted from the credits for Apple Music.

Dr. Dog

- Toby Leaman – bass, vocals
- Scott McMicken – guitar, vocals
- Frank McElroy – guitar
- Zach Miller – keyboards
- Eric Slick – drums
- Dimitri Manos – percussion

Production

- Dr. Dog – producer
- Nathan Sabatino – producer and engineering

== Charts ==
Chart performance for "That Old Black Hole"
| Chart (2012) | Peak position |
|---|---|
| Scenes 'n' Soundwaves 100 | 31 |

== Release history ==
The song was first released on November 29, 2011, as the first song made available from Be the Void. It was subsequently included as the second track on the album, which was released on February 7, 2012.

| Region | Date | Format | Label |
|---|---|---|---|
| United States | November 29, 2011 | Digital download | Anti- |
| United States | February 7, 2012 | Be the Void | Anti- |
