= Passed Away, Vol. 1 =

Compilation album by Dr. Dog
- Released: March 4, 2008
- Recorded: 2002–2007, Philadelphia
- Genre: Psychedelic rock, indie rock
- Length: 38:41
- Label: Park the Van

Dr. Dog chronology
We All Belong (2007)	Passed Away, Vol. 1 (2008)	Fate (2008)

Passed Away, Vol. 1 is a digital compilation by Dr. Dog. The album, which was released March 4, 2008, is a collection of songs from a variety of times and places, found on old tapes and demos, that the band wished to release. The songs are more lo-fi than the latter releases of Dr. Dog, comparable to their early work. Dr. Dog's traditional style of frequent doo-wop melodies occur as well, which becomes a highly noticeable characteristic for the album. All of the songs have been streaming prior to their release, at the promotional website for their previous record, We All Belong.

== Track listing ==
No.	Title	Length
1.	"Oh Me Oh My"	4:39
2.	"Going Home"	3:14
3.	"The Man Who Was Wrong"	7:14
4.	"I'm Standing in the Light"	3:58
5.	"A Long Time Ago"	3:46
6.	"Oh My God"	2:38
7.	"Me and My Girl"	3:27
8.	"Eyesing the Blues"	3:30
9.	"Little Bird"	3:55
10.	"Beer Can"	1:20
Total length:		38:41

== Personnel ==
Dr. Dog is:

- Toby "Tables" Leaman – writing, bass, vocals
- Scott "Taxi" McMicken – writing, lead guitar, vocals
- Frank "Thanks" McElroy – rhythm guitar, vocals
- Zach "Text" Miller – piano, keyboards, harpsichord
- Juston "Triumph" Stens - drums, percussion, vocals
