= Takers and Leavers =

EP by Dr. Dog
- Released: September 12, 2006
- Genre: Psychedelic rock, indie rock
- Length: 28:23
- Label: Park the Van PTV706
- Producer: Bill Moriarty

Dr. Dog chronology
Easy Beat (2005)	Takers and Leavers (2006)	We All Belong (2007)

Professional ratings
Review scores
Source	Rating
Rolling Stone	3/5 stars

Takers and Leavers is an EP by Dr. Dog. It was released a year before their LP, We All Belong, which re-released "Ain't It Strange" and "Die Die Die".

The first 1000 copies had custom covers, which featured various images and assortments of random art. The standard EP was produced later that month.

== Track listing ==
No.	Title	Length
1.	"Ain't It Strange"	4:28
2.	"Goner"	4:16
3.	"I've Just Got to Tell You"	2:51
4.	"Die Die Die"	3:01
5.	"California"	3:09
6.	"Livin' a Dream"	5:48
Total length:		28:23

== Personnel ==
Dr. Dog is:

- Toby "Tables" Leaman: bass, vocals
- Scott "Taxi" McMicken: lead guitar, vocals
- Zachery "Text" Miller: keyboards
- Juston "Triumph" Stens: drums, vocals
- Francis "Thanks" McElroy: rhythm guitar, vocals

Additional Musicians:

- Harmonica John: harmonica on Livin' A Dream

== Title of EP ==
The title Takers and Leavers is from a poem recited at the end of Livin' a Dream, the final track of the EP.

Well, I know there's always been greed and green acres, and war and peace makers. And then there's your takers and your leavers, your havers and your needers.

The poem was written by Dr. Dog's Scott McMicken.
