= Dr. Dog (album) =

Studio album by Dr. Dog
- Released: July 19, 2024
- Length: 39:58
- Label: We Buy Gold

Dr. Dog chronology
Critical Equation (2018)	Dr. Dog (2024)

Dr. Dog is the eleventh album by American psychedelic rock band Dr. Dog. It was released on July 19, 2024, on the We Buy Gold label.

== Production ==
In 2021, Dr. Dog announced their final tour, citing their wishes to maintain creative purity and focus on their personal lives. A period of exploration followed, leading to the creation of a new record, a self-titled album released on July 19, 2024.

The sessions for Dr. Dog began at bassist and co-songwriter Toby Leaman's uncle's cabin in Forksville, Pennsylvania. The recording process for this album was influenced by guitarist and co-songwriter Scott McMicken's experience recording with Big Thief, with McMicken taking over as producer for the project.

== Release ==
The album was released on July 19, 2024. The announcement of a new record came as a surprise to many fans who had assumed the band had effectively quit music after their "final tour".

== Track listing ==
All tracks are written by Dr. Dog.

Dr. Dog track listing
No.	Title	Length
1.	"Authority"	3:30
2.	"Lost Ones"	4:30
3.	"Fat Dog"	4:30
4.	"Talk is Cheap"	4:30
5.	"What a Night'll Do"	3:37
6.	"Tell Your Friends"	2:34
7.	"Still Can't Believe"	3:22
8.	"Fine White Lies"	3:55
9.	"White Dove"	2:23
10.	"Handyman"	3:41
11.	"Love Struck" (featuring M. Ward)	3:20
Total length:		39:58

== Personnel ==
Dr. Dog

- Toby Leaman – vocals, bass
- Scott McMicken – vocals, guitar
- Zach Miller – keys
- Frank McElroy – guitar, vocals
- Eric Slick – drums, vocals on "Tell Your Friends"

Additional personnel

- M. Ward – vocals on "Love Struck"
