= Pat Finnerty =

American YouTube personality (born 1980)

- Born: Patrick Quinn Finnerty; 1979 or 1980 (age 46–47)
- Occupations: Musician; YouTuber; podcast host
- Years active: 2004–present
- Musical career
- Genres: Indie rock; alternative rock; pop punk
- Instruments: Guitar; vocals; bass
- Member of: Pat Finnerty and the Full Band; August Is Falling
- Formerly of: Okay Paddy; And the Moneynotes

YouTube information
- Channel: Pat Finnerty
- Genres: Vlog; music
- Subscribers: 230 thousand
- Views: 14.8 million
- Last updated: April 25, 2026

Patrick Quinn Finnerty (born February 13, 1980) is an American musician and YouTube personality based in Philadelphia. As a singer-guitarist, his projects include Okay Paddy, And the Moneynotes, Pat Finnerty and the Full Band, and August is Falling. On social media channels, Finnerty is known for posting original song compositions and giving critical reviews of popular music songs in the What Makes This Song Stink series.

== Early life and education ==
Finnerty spent his early life in Scranton, Pennsylvania, United States. He began playing live music in bands at the age of 16, Finnerty has said in the past that he was inspired to start playing by acts like Weezer, Ween, and Nirvana. Finnerty later attended Temple University. By 2010, Finnerty lived in West Philadelphia, where he still resided as of August 2020.

== Career ==
=== Musical projects ===
Finnerty has been based in Philadelphia since about 2010 (he currently resides in West Philadelphia, though he was not born nor raised there). His musical projects have included Okay Paddy, And The Moneynotes, Heavy Blonde, The Tom Petty Appreciation Band, and Pat Finnerty and the Full Band. In 2015, The Lid, a rock opera by Pat Finnerty, had a three-night run at the Underground Arts theater. Finnerty has also taken on gigs as a sideman guitarist, such as performing onstage with members of Dr. Dog and touring as a guitarist with Strand of Oaks.

=== YouTube and Instagram ===
Finnerty joined YouTube in 2009. By the early 2020s, Finnerty's viral online content and musical performances had made him a renowned singer-guitarist in the Philadelphia music scene. Toward the end of 2023, he had over 166,000 subscribers and over 7.74 million total views.

Finnerty is known to use social-media platforms to release original song recordings. In 2014, he released the humorous songs "Raggae Dog" and "Raggae Dog II: Reflection" via YouTube.

His social-media channels gained national acclaim in May 2020 when he posted videos online of his band performing live, rooftop concerts in Philadelphia that complied with COVID-19 social-distancing measures and that supported Black Lives Matter.

On the Instagram platform, Finnerty's presence is branded as "The Pat Finnerty Show". In August 2020, Finnerty staged a 24-hour Instagram livestream event referred to as "Grohlathon" in an attempt to get the attention of Foo Fighters' front man Dave Grohl. At the nine-hour mark of his stream, to the surprise of Finnerty, Grohl joined via chat while hosting a dinner party with his friends. Grohl and Finnerty chatted for several minutes, and Grohl played part of the Dire Straits' song, "Money for Nothing", at the request of Finnerty.

Finnerty became well known for his video series What Makes This Song Stink, a spoof of YouTuber Rick Beato's series "What Makes This Song Great?", where he analyzes the musical concepts in popular songs and offers social commentary about the song's lyrics and commercial appeal. The series has reviewed "Kryptonite" by 3 Doors Down, "All Summer Long" by Kid Rock, "Beverly Hills" by Weezer, "Hey, Soul Sister" by Train, multiple songs by Lenny Kravitz, "Dani California" by the Red Hot Chili Peppers, "Emo Girl" by Machine Gun Kelly, "Try That In A Small Town" by Jason Aldean and "Lonely Road" by Machine Gun Kelly and Jelly Roll. Finnerty also releases "Little Stinkers", which are shorter videos than the approximately 45-minute videos of the main series including songs by artists such as Nickelback, Walker Hayes & Monster Truck. In 2022, Finnerty adapted the What Makes This Song Stink series as a podcast.

Finnerty's videos are characterized by his niche humor, social interaction with people on the street and running gags, such as saying "Beato!" after mentioning music theory concepts.

In April 2021, Finnerty's critical review video of the Weezer song "Beverly Hills" helped popularize the term, "The Weezer Conversation", about the complicated relationship fans of the band Weezer have with how the band's songwriting and album development have progressed over the band's tenure.

Finnerty is good friends with members of rock band Dr. Dog and to support his critical review video of Train's "Hey, Soul Sister", he convinced the band to release a cover of "Here Comes the Hotstepper" by reggae singer Ini Kamoze.

=== August is Falling ===
Finnerty founded August is Falling, a pop-punk, emo-style music project. Finnerty wrote the songs and played guitars and sang vocals, and Eric Slick played drums, on the band's The Simple Plan EP that was released independently in 2022. Lyrics of the songs on the EP take aim at the popular music industry, internet culture, and the state of the emo movement. The EP's fifth song track, "August is Falling", was mixed by acclaimed music producer Butch Walker.

A running gag on Finnerty's social media channels was that he hoped to earn enough money from The Simple Plan EP to purchase a hot tub. As of December 2023, he has achieved his goal of acquiring a hot tub, in the form of an inflatable non-permanent hot tub in the confines of his garage.

== Discography ==
=== Okay Paddy ===
- Hunk (2004)
- Snow Tracks (2016)

=== And the Moneynotes ===
- This Year We Hunt (2007)
- New Cornucopia (2008)
- On The Town, on The Vine (2009)

=== Pat Finnerty and the Full Band ===
- "The Weezer Conversation" (2014)
- The Lid (2018 digital release)
- "Lake House" (2020)
- "Tough Gig" (2020)
- "Rest of It" (2022)
- "Sniffin'" (2026)

=== Other projects ===
- Pat Finnerty, "Reggae Dog" and "Reggae Dog II: Reflection" (2014)
- Heavy Blonde, compilation of 11 song tracks (2015)
- Tortured Agony, "Dead Man Trail" (2021)
- August is Falling, The Simple Plan EP (2022)

=== Other credits ===
- Toby Leaman, Military Applications (2022)—lead guitar

== See also ==
- Machine Gun Kelly (musician)
- Dr. Dog
- Red Hot Chili Peppers
- August Is Falling
- Lenny Kravitz
- Ini Kamoze
- 3 Doors Down
- Rick Beato
