= Where'd All the Time Go? =

2010 song by Dr. Dog

Song by Dr. Dog

from the album Shame, Shame
- Released: April 6, 2010
- Recorded: 2009
- Studio: Meth Beach, Philadelphia, Pennsylvania
- Genre: Baroque pop
- Length: 3:55
- Label: Anti-

"Where'd All the Time Go?" is a song by the American indie rock band Dr. Dog from their sixth studio album Shame, Shame (2010). It was released on April 6, 2010, through Anti-. In 2024, Billboard Philippines included the song in its "graduation playlist", and popularity on TikTok.

The song was featured in the second season of Outer Banks specifically in Episode 203 "Prayers".

== Reception ==
In a review of Shame, Shame, Zach Kelly of Pitchfork described the song as a "euphoric farmhouse jam" that recalls the Flaming Lips at their most anthemic. In a review for Paste, the song was described as featuring Scott McMicken's vocals, a mellotron, backing harmonies and guitar licks, with a sound compared to a track from Pet Sounds by the Beach Boys.

In 2010, NPR described the song as a swirling baroque pop track and compared it to the work of the Left Banke. In 2024, American Songwriter included the song in a list of modern songs that resemble the music of the Beatles.

== Credits ==
Credits adapted from the credits for Apple Music.

Dr. Dog

- Frank McElroy – backing vocals, rhythm guitar
- Juston Stens – drums, percussion
- Scott McMicken – guitar, vocals
- Toby Leaman – bass, vocals
- Zach Miller – backing vocals, keyboards

Production

- Dr. Dog – producer
- Rob Schnapf – producer
- Dough Boehm – engineer
- Bill Moriarty – mixing engineer
- Justin Chapman – assistant mixing engineer

== Charts ==
"Where'd All the Time Go?" reached number 12 on the UK Official Independent Singles Breakers Chart, where it spent two weeks.

Chart performance for "Where'd All the Time Go?"
Chart (2021)	Peak position
UK Official Charts	12
