= Be the Void =

Studio album by Dr. Dog
- Released: February 7, 2012
- Genres: Indie rock, blues rock, neo-psychedelia
- Length: 47:42
- Label: Anti-

Dr. Dog chronology
Shame, Shame (2010)	Be the Void (2012)	B-Room (2013)

Be the Void is the seventh album by psychedelic rock band Dr. Dog. It was released on February 7, 2012. It is the band's second release on the Anti- record label after moving from Park the Van, and was co-produced by Nathan Sabatino and Dr. Dog.

== Album info ==
The band "lusted after 'the immediacy, looseness, loudness, chaos, fast tempos and dirtier' nature of their live performances, where they leave behind any 'perfectionist attitudes' in favor of spontaneous passion." Tracking for the album took place at Nathan Sabatino's Loveland Studio in Tucson, AZ as well as Dr. Dog's Meth Beach Studio in Philadelphia, PA. Mixing was completed at The Studio, Philadelphia PA by Nathan Sabatino and Dr. Dog.

== Reception ==
Professional ratings
Review scores
Source	Rating
AllMusic	4/5 stars
The A.V. Club	A−
Beats Per Minute	(85%)
Boston Phoenix	4/5 stars
Paste Magazine	(7.5/10)
Pitchfork Media	(5.7/10)
Under The Gun Review	8/10

Matt Rice said in his review for VZ Magazine "Be the Void is excellent. The first track, “Lonesome,” is as perfect as folky indie gets, and the album just gets better and better as it goes on."

== Track listing ==
All songs written by Toby Leaman and Scott McMicken.

1. "Lonesome" - 3:19
2. "That Old Black Hole" - 3:21
3. "These Days" - 2:47
4. "How Long Must I Wait?" - 3:40
5. "Get Away" - 4:01
6. "Do The Trick" - 4:33
7. "Vampire" - 4:27
8. "Heavy Light" - 3:41
9. "Big Girl" - 5:03
10. "Over Here, Over There" - 4:01
11. "Warrior Man" - 4:58
12. "Turning The Century" - 3:50

Deluxe Edition bonus tracks

13. "Exit For Sale" - 5:01
14. "Control Yourself" - 3:36
15. "What A Fool" - 2:42

== Personnel ==
Dr. Dog

- Toby Leaman - bass, lead and backing vocals, guitar, and wurlitzer
- Scott McMicken - lead guitar, lead and backing vocals, percussion, bass, keyboards, and banjo
- Frank McElroy - rhythm guitar, backing vocals, lap steel guitar, and electrical sitar
- Zach Miller - keyboards, pianos, organs, guitar, and backing vocals
- Eric Slick - drums, percussion, secret voices, and cello
- Dimitri Manos - percussion, tape loop effects, drums, and guitar

Additional Musicians:

- Janka Perniss - violin on "Get Away"
- Nathan Sabatino - cello on "Get Away"
- Sean Rogers - bass on "How Long Must I Wait?"
- Forrest Reda - backing vocals on "Lonesome"

== Charts ==
Chart (2012)	Peak position
Billboard 200 (U.S.)	45
Billboard Top Independent Albums (U.S.)	6
Billboard Top Rock Albums (U.S.)	12
Billboard Top Alternative Albums (U.S.)	8
Billboard Tastemaker Albums (U.S.)	8

Singles:

Single	Chart	Position
"That Old Black Hole"		-
