= Shame, Shame =

Studio album by Dr. Dog
- Released: April 6, 2010
- Studios: Dreamland (West Hurley); Meth Beach (Philadelphia); The Studio (Philadelphia)
- Genres: Psychedelic rock; indie rock
- Length: 39:25
- Label: Anti-
- Producers: Dr. Dog; Rob Schnapf

Dr. Dog chronology
Fate (2008)	Shame, Shame (2010)	Be the Void (2012)

Professional ratings
Review scores
Source	Rating
AllMusic	4.5/5 stars
American Songwriter	4/5 stars
The A.V. Club	B+
Consequence of Sound	4.5/5 stars
Drowned in Sound	8/10
One Thirty BPM	65%
Pitchfork	6.7/10
Spin	3.5/5 stars
Toro	4.0/5 stars

Shame, Shame is the sixth album by the American psychedelic rock band Dr. Dog. It was released on April 6, 2010, and is the band's first release under Anti- after leaving Park the Van.

== Album information ==
The band hoped to more accurately recreate the energy of their live shows on the album. "We were taking those experience on stage as reference points, rather than shedding them when we go into the studio, which is what we would always do," co-frontman Scott McMicken said. "We chose a batch of songs that are a little darker, or a little bit more heart-on-your-sleeve kind of stuff."

The album also contains the most emotional lyrical content of the band's career. On Dr. Dog's website, McMicken said of the song "Jackie Wants a Black Eye": "It's one of the most literal songs that I’ve ever written, and it was important for me because I had been in a bad state for awhile." Toby Leaman, the other frontman, also claims that "Station" is the only song he has ever written about touring and "leaving over and over again".

Many of the songs had been in the works for years. In an interview with ACRN, McMicken said that "Station" and "Unbearable Why" had been originally recorded for other albums, and "Where'd All the Time Go?" had been written eight years prior.

In 2021, "Where'd All the Time Go?" was "widely used" in TikTok videos showing changes in the creators' lives over time. In June 2023, the song was certified platinum by the RIAA.

== Track listing ==
All tracks are written by Dr. Dog; "Shadow People" written with Dan Auerbach.

Shame, Shame – Standard edition
No.	Title	Length
1.	"Stranger"	3:43
2.	"Shadow People"	4:13
3.	"Station"	3:11
4.	"Unbearable Why"	3:11
5.	"Where'd All The Time Go?"	3:52
6.	"Later"	3:07
7.	"I Only Wear Blue"	3:42
8.	"Someday"	3:21
9.	"Mirror, Mirror"	2:48
10.	"Jackie Wants a Black Eye"	3:03
11.	"Shame, Shame"	5:14
Total length:		39:25

Shame, Shame – Deluxe edition bonus tracks
No.	Title	Length
12.	"It"	3:52
13.	"What a Strange Day"	2:59
14.	"Oh Man"	3:42
15.	"Take Me Into Town"	4:23
16.	"Black-Red"	4:07
17.	"Nobody Knows Who You Are"	3:59
18.	"The Sound"	4:07
Total length:		66:34

== Personnel ==
Credits are adapted from the album's liner notes, Tidal, and PopMatters.

=== Dr. Dog ===
- Toby Leaman – bass guitar, vocals, production, engineering, mixing, artwork
- Frank McElroy – guitar, production, engineering, mixing, artwork
- Scott McMicken – guitar, vocals, production, engineering, mixing, artwork
- Zach Miller – keyboards, production, engineering, mixing, artwork
- Eric Slick – drums, production, engineering, mixing, artwork

=== Additional contributors ===
- Rob Schnapf – production
- Bill Moriarty – mixing
- Adam Armstrong – studio assistance
- Elijah Walker – studio assistance
- Justin Chapman– mixing assistance
- Greg Calbi – mastering
- Israel J. Molina – artwork
- Tom Bendel – drums on "Station"
- Gregg Mervine – drums on "Unbearable Why"
- Eliza Jones on "Mirror, Mirror"
- Jackie Jugan – vocals on "Jackie Wants a Black Eye"
- John Balzarini – vocals on "Jackie Wants a Black Eye"
- Jim James – background vocals on "Shame, Shame"
