= The Shadow People =

The Shadow People may refer to:

== "The Shadow People" ==
- The Shadow People (audiobook), a 2009 Sarah Jane Adventures audiobook
- "The Shadow People", a 1952 The Hall of Fantasy radio drama featuring a character from the Sheridan Le Fanu novel Carmilla
- The Shadow People, a 1969 novel by Margaret St. Clair

== "Shadow people" ==
- Shadow people, a paranormal or supernatural belief
- Shadow People (film), a 2013 American film
- "Shadow People" (Dr. Dog song), a 2010 song from the album Shame, Shame by Dr. Dog
- "Shadow People", a 2025 song from the album Para Bellum by the thrash metal band Testament
