= Shadow People (Dr. Dog song) =

2010 single by Dr. Dog

Single by Dr. Dog

from the album Shame, Shame
- Released: February 16, 2010
- Recorded: 2010
- Studio: Meth Beach, Philadelphia, Pennsylvania
- Genre: Indie rock
- Length: 4:13
- Label: Anti-
- Songwriters: Scott McMicken, Toby Leaman, Frank McElroy, Dan Auerbach
- Producer: Rob Schnapf

Music video
- "Shadow People" on YouTube

"Shadow People" is a song by the American rock band Dr. Dog from their sixth studio album Shame, Shame (2010). It was released as the album's first single on February 16, 2010, through Anti-.

"Shadow People" was written by Scott McMicken, Toby Leaman, Frank McElroy, and Dan Auerbach. The song appeared on several radio station year-end countdowns in 2010. According to RockLists, it reached number three on WXPN's Year in Review: Top 100 Songs of 2010.

== Content ==
"Shadow People" was the first single from their sixth album Shame, Shame. The song was recorded in 2010 at Meth Beach in Philadelphia, Pennsylvania, and released digitally on February 16, 2010, through Anti-. In a 2010 article for Stereogum, Amrit Singh described the song as a "West Philly diary", linking it to the people and places in West Philadelphia. KUTX later reported that the song was originally about the West Philadelphia neighborhood of co-singer Scott McMicken.

== Music video ==
The music video for "Shadow People" was directed by Ted Passon and premiered on September 15, 2010. The video shows the band visiting the Holiday Skating Center, where they spend time with people who regularly visit the venue.

== Reception ==
Josh Keller of Reviler praised the song's bass lines, vocal harmonies and keyboard parts. He also described it as a strong example of the band's sound. Edith Zimmerman of Vulture described "Shadow People" as an uplifting song. Brandon Stosuy of Stereogum described the song as a laid-back rock song.
