= The Simple Plan =

2022 EP by August is Falling

EP by August Is Falling
- Released: September 2, 2022
- Recorded: 2022
- Genre: Pop punk, emo pop
- Length: 13:43
- Producer: Pat Finnerty; Butch Walker

Singles from The Simple Plan
- 1. "August Is Falling"

The Simple Plan is an EP released independently in 2022 by August Is Falling, a pop-punk/emo music project led by American singer-guitarist Pat Finnerty. All of the EP's tracks were written by Finnerty, who played guitar and sang lead vocals on the recording. Music producer Butch Walker mixed the EP's single, "August Is Falling". The EP also features appearances from Eric Slick and Toby Leaman of Dr. Dog and from Kim Whitehill.

== Development and release ==
In mid 2022, Philadelphia-based musician and YouTube personality Pat Finnerty founded August Is Falling, a pop-punk, emo-style music project. Finnerty wrote the songs, played guitars and sang vocals on the band's The Simple Plan EP that was released independently on September 2, 2022. The EP featured Toby Leaman, Kim, and Butch Walker on tracks, as well as an appearance by Eric Slick on drums. Musical artist Harsh Symmetry appeared on the EP's cover. The EP's fifth song track, "August Is Falling", was mixed by acclaimed music producer Butch Walker and released as a single. A lyrics video of the same track was produced by J. Gonzo.

According to Finnerty, the title of the EP spoofs Canadian pop punk band Simple Plan. Lyrics of the songs on the EP take aim at the popular music industry, internet culture, and the state of the emo movement. The EP both lampoons and pays homage to emo/pop-punk bands.

The EP's independent release was backed by a grassroots movement to promote it on YouTube. The single, "August is Falling", garnered 140,000 views on YouTube in its first week after release with August is Falling trending as the Number 1 punk band on BandCamp, and the EP was featured on Spotify's new pop punk playlist at the time.

== Critical reception ==
The band and EP received praise from the Darkness front man Justin Hawkins after its release. The website Craig's Music Review rated the EP 8 out of 10.

Music critic Mark Rowland of Penny Black Music said the EP "sounds like it’s dumbing itself down somewhat to meet the expectations of the genre – to the point of parody in places – but at the same time, the songs are genuinely well constructed and catchy".

Music commentator Allan Raible of ABC News ranked the EP #45 on his list of the top 50 albums of 2022. Raible said about The Simple Plan EP on the Good Morning America website, "Weirdly, it is supposed to be a joke, but Finnerty is a great musician and songwriter, creating five songs that both lampoon the genre and pay fitting, pitch-perfect, wonderfully immature homage to bands like Blink-182. Armed with skill and heart, this EP is infinitely more than a sarcastic footnote."

The video debut of August is Falling and The Simple Plan was named best on YouTube for the MidRange Awards 2022.

== Track listing ==
All tracks are written by Pat Finnerty

The Simple Plan EP (2022)
No.	Title	Length
1.	"The Simple Plan"	2:49
2.	"Mad This Summer"	2:46
3.	"Btgg" (featuring Toby Leaman)	2:33
4.	"Don't Click the Link" (featuring Kim)	2:39
5.	"August Is Falling" (featuring Butch Walker)	2:56
Total length:		13:43

== Personnel ==
Musicians

- Pat Finnerty – lead vocals, guitars (all tracks); bass (tracks 1, 2, 4, 5), drums (tracks 1, 4)
- Pat Berkery – drums (track 2)
- Toby Leaman – bass guitar, vocals (track 3)
- Travis Harrison – drums (track 3)
- Balzman – background vocals (track 3)
- Zach Miller – keyboards (track 4)
- Kim – vocals (track 4)
- Eric Slick – drums (track 5)

Technical

- Pat Finnerty – production (tracks 1–4), engineering (all tracks), mixing (tracks 1, 4)
- Butch Walker – production, mixing (track 5)
- Travis Harrison – mastering (all tracks), mixing (track 3)
- Tim "BigTimmy11" Phillips – mixing (track 2)

== See also ==
- "Emo Girl", a 2022 song by Machine Gun Kelly
