= Easy Beat =

Easy Beat may refer to:

- Easy Beat (album), a 2005 album by Dr. Dog
- Easy Beat (BBC radio), a programme broadcast 1960–1967
- The Easybeats, an Australian rock band 1964–1969
