= We All Belong =

Studio album by Dr. Dog
- Released: February 27, 2007
- Genre: Rock, psychedelic rock
- Length: 38:27 (w/o bonus tracks); 46:50 (w/ bonus tracks)
- Label: Park the Van

Dr. Dog chronology
Takers and Leavers - EP (2006)	We All Belong (2007)	Passed Away, Vol. 1 (2008)

Professional ratings
Review scores
Source	Rating
AllMusic	4/5 stars
Entertainment Weekly	A-
Rolling Stone	3.5/5 stars

We All Belong is the fourth album by Dr. Dog. It was released on February 27, 2007. The album finds the band adding more to their typical indie-rock sound, including a wider variety of instruments and psychedelic group harmony. The entire record, as well as the preceding Takers and Leavers EP, was recorded on 24-track tape. This album was number 39 on Rolling Stone's list of the Top 50 Albums of 2007. The song "Old News" was number 40 on Rolling Stone's list of the 100 Best Songs of 2007. The album was twice sampled, by rapper Chiddy Bang, "Ain't It Strange" on "Grab a Plate" and "My Old Ways" by The Preview's "Old Ways".

== Track listing ==
1. "Old News" – 1:51
2. "My Old Ways" – 3:31
3. "Keep a Friend" – 3:32
4. "The Girl" – 3:28
5. "Alaska" – 3:59
6. "Weekend" – 2:44
7. "Ain't It Strange" – 4:28
8. "Worst Trip" – 3:00
9. "The Way the Lazy Do" – 3:37
10. "Die, Die, Die" – 3:04
11. "We All Belong" – 5:17
12. "I Hope There's Love" – 4:08 (Bonus track available on iTunes and a limited edition 7")
13. "Goner" – 4:17 (Bonus track available on limited edition 7", and from Takers and Leavers)

== Personnel ==
Dr. Dog is:

- Toby "Tables" Leaman – writing, bass, vocals
- Scott "Taxi" McMicken – writing, lead guitar, vocals
- Frank "Thanks" McElroy – rhythm guitar, vocals
- Zach "Text" Miller – piano, keyboards, harpsichord
- Juston "Triumph" Stens - drums, percussion, vocals

Additional musicians:

- Brendan Cooney - string/horn arrangement (track 11), trombone
- Dan Scofield - tenor/alto/baritone sax
- John Petit - trumpet
- Carlos Santiago - violins
- Mel Leaman - backing vocals (track 6)
