= Fate (Dr. Dog album) =

Studio album by Dr. Dog
- Released: July 22, 2008
- Genre: Indie rock, Americana, neo-psychedelia, chamber pop
- Length: 44:15
- Label: Park the Van

Dr. Dog chronology
Passed Away, Vol. 1 (2008)	Fate (2008)	Shame, Shame (2010)

Fate is the fifth album by Philadelphia indie rock band Dr. Dog. It was released on July 22, 2008. The album introduces some new studio elements to their established indie rock sound.

== Background ==
Pre-orders from the album, depending on where it was pre-ordered, included signed CD art, a signed or unsigned 7" with two new songs ('The Dearly Departed' and 'Is It Worth My Time'), stickers, posters, t-shirts, and the album on vinyl.

The song "My Friend" was featured in trailers for the Judd Apatow film Funny People.

== Album cover ==
The cover is a picture of a painting with the outlines sewn on done by Chicago native Ken Ellis. It was directly inspired by a picture of ill-fated outlaw duo Bonnie and Clyde. When the members of Dr. Dog saw the painting at Chicago's Rainbo Club, where Ellis bartended, they quickly bought it from him. They then used it as the album cover because they thought it fit with the general aesthetic of the album.

Professional ratings
Review scores
Source	Rating
AbsolutePunk.net	(88%)
Allmusic	3.5/5 stars
Billboard	(Positive)
Entertainment Weekly	(A−)
Filter	(93%)
Rolling Stone	3.5/5 stars
Pitchfork Media	(5.5/10)

== Track listing ==
All tracks are written by Dr. Dog.

No.	Title	Length
1.	"The Breeze"	3:59
2.	"Hang On"	4:01
3.	"The Old Days"	3:41
4.	"Army of Ancients"	4:05
5.	"The Rabbit, the Bat, and the Reindeer"	3:29
6.	"The Ark"	3:37
7.	"From"	4:39
8.	"100 Years"	4:06
9.	"Uncovering the Old"	3:21
10.	"The Beach"	3:41
11.	"My Friend"	5:36
Total length:		44:15

Bonus tracks on Japanese CD version
No.	Title	Length
12.	"The Dearly Departed"	3:00
13.	"Is It Worth My Time?"	3:56

Bonus tracks on iTunes version
No.	Title	Length
12.	"The Dearly Departed"	3:14
13.	"Drop Me Off"	4:03
14.	"From (alternate version)"	5:10

== Personnel ==
Dr. Dog is:

- Toby "Tables" Leaman - vocals, bass, upright bass
- Scott "Taxi" McMicken - vocals, lead guitar, piano
- Frank "Thanks" McElroy - rhythm guitar, vocals
- Zach "Text" Miller - keyboards, piano, guitar
- Juston "Triumph" Stens - drums, percussion, vocals

Additional Musicians:

- Danny Scofield - saxophones
- Janka Perniss - violin
- Tommy Bindle - percussion
- Steve Duffy - trombone
- Kimbal Brown - trumpet
- John Pettit - trumpet
- Heather Fortune - flute
- Laura Foxx - clarinet
- Victoria Baltimore - cello
- Megan Smith - oboe
- Eliza Jones - vocals

Additional Production:

- Brendan Cooney - string and horn arrangements
- Greg Calbi – mastering
- Ken Ellis – paintings
- Bill Moriarty – mixing
- T. William Moriarty – production coordination
- Kyle Pulley – production assistant, mixing assistant
