= Deleted Scenes (band) =

- Origin: Washington, D.C., United States
- Genre: Rock
- Years active: 2005–2014
- Labels: Park the Van, Sockets, What Delicate Recordings, Echelon Productions
- Members: Dan Scheuerman; Matt Dowling; Dominic Campanaro; Ricardo Lagomasino
- Website: www.deletedscenesmusic.com

Deleted Scenes were an American art rock band formed in 2005. The band were disbanded in 2014.

== Background ==
The band formed in 2005 in Washington, D.C. by three members of the short-lived Olney, MD, band Fell off the Face of the Earth: Dan Scheuerman (lead vocals and guitar), Matt Dowling (bass, keyboards, guitar and backing vocals), and Dominic Campanaro (guitar and keyboards). Ricardo Lagomasino (drums) joined in 2012, replacing Brian Hospital. The art rock style of Deleted Scenes is, according to Lane Billings of Paste Magazine, "nearly impossible to categorize," combining elements of rock, punk, avant-garde, pop, noise, psych, math rock, and Americana. Frontman Dan Scheuerman contributes confessional, poetic lyrics to the songs.

In January 2009, Deleted Scenes' debut album Birdseed Shirt came out on Brooklyn label What Delicate Recordings. It was engineered in part by J. Robbins and produced and mixed by L Skell. Pitchfork awarded the album with an 8.0, calling it "ferocious, brave, and a well-balanced demonstration of both thoughtful existentialism and strange, drowsy downers." NPR noted its "playfully unpredictable songs that veer in unexpected directions while remaining completely infectious." The title of the record was taken from Jonathan Safran Foer's novel Extremely Loud and Incredibly Close.

In the fall of 2010, the band convened in a disused garden center in Hockessen, DE with Birdseed Shirt producer L. Skell and Nick Krill of The Spinto Band to record their second album, Young People's Church of the Air. The resulting album, released by Sockets Records in 2011 and re-released by Park the Van in 2012, "balances out the group's experimental impulses with an uncanny knack for pop hooks," according to Paste. In his 7.8 review for Pitchfork, Aaron Leitko praised Scheuerman's "gift for distilling complex thought into everyday language"."

In March 2013, Deleted Scenes began recording sessions in Philadelphia, PA with Brian McTear and Jon Low, a production duo who have worked with Kurt Vile, Sharon Van Etten, The War on Drugs, and The National.

On December 29, 2014, the band announced their disbandment on their Facebook page, stating "We're done. Called it in August. Thanks to everyone to whom it mattered."

Dowling currently performs in the EFFECTS, who released a full-length album on Dischord Records in 2017.

== Discography ==
- Deleted Scenes EP (2007, Echelon Productions)
- Birdseed Shirt (2009, What Delicate Recordings)
- Young People's Church of the Air (2012, Park the Van Records)
- Lithium Burn (2014, Park the Van Records)
