= Easy Beat (album) =

Studio album by Dr. Dog
- Released: March 15, 2005
- Genre: Psychedelic rock
- Length: 37:52
- Label: Park the Van

Dr. Dog chronology
Toothbrush (2002)	Easy Beat (2005)	Takers and Leavers - EP (2006)

Professional ratings
Review scores
Source	Rating
AllMusic	4.5/5 stars
Pitchfork	4.4/10

Easy Beat is the second studio album by Dr. Dog. It was released March 15, 2005 on CD and vinyl. It was the first release on Park the Van Records, as well as the band's first official release on a record label.

== Recording ==
The album was written and recorded entirely with 1/4-inch eight track tape at Dr. Dog's home studio.

== Track listing ==
All tracks are written by Dr. Dog.

No.	Title	Length
1.	"The World May Never Know"	3:02
2.	"The Pretender"	5:31
3.	"Oh No"	4:05
4.	"Easy Beat"	4:55
5.	"Dutchman Falls"	4:12
6.	"Fools Life"	2:26
7.	"Say Something"	5:38
8.	"Today"	3:23
9.	"Wake Up"	4:40
Total length:		37:52

== Personnel ==
Dr. Dog is:

- Toby "Tables" Leaman – bass, vocals
- Scott " Taxi" McMicken – guitar, vocals
- Zach "Text" Miller – keyboard
- Juston "Triumph" Stens – drums, vocals
- Andrew "Trial" Jones – guitar

Additional Musicians:

- Jesse Moynihan – violin
- Bill Moriarty – mixing
- Uncle Mark – bowed bass
- Steven Vertel – mastering
- Brendan Cooney – string arrangements
- Dimitri Manos – drums (track 5)
- Dr. Dog – engineer
