= B-Room =

Studio album by Dr. Dog
- Released: October 1, 2013
- Genres: Indie rock, blues rock, neo-psychedelia
- Length: 47:42
- Label: Anti-
- Producer: Nathan Sabatino

Dr. Dog chronology
| Be The Void (2012) | B-Room (2013) | The Psychedelic Swamp (2016) |

Professional ratings
Aggregate scores
| Source | Rating |
|---|---|
| Metacritic | 73/100 |
Review scores
| Source | Rating |
| AllMusic | 4.5/5 stars |
| American Songwriter | 3.5/5 stars |
| Clash | 3/10 |
| Consequence of Sound | 3/5 stars |
| Exclaim! | 6/10 |
| Filter | 81% |
| Paste | 7.7/10 |
| Pitchfork Media | 5.4/10 |
| Popmatters | 7/10 |
| Under the Radar | 7/10 |

B-Room is the seventh studio album by psychedelic rock band Dr. Dog. It was released on October 1, 2013. It is the band's third release on the Anti- record label, and the first album they recorded in their newly built studio. It was co-produced, engineered and mixed by Nathan Sabatino. The album reached No. 50 on the Billboard Hot 200

== Album info ==
According to Spin, the new record was a much more collaborative process, as the band “worked together from scratch, mimicking the manner in which they built their studio.”

Dr. Dog released the first track from the album - "The Truth" - on July 22, 2013.

Dr. Dog released the second track from the album - "Broken Heart" - on August 26, 2013.

Dr. Dog released the eleventh track from the album - "Love" - on September 17, 2013.

Dr. Dog made all of B-Room available for streaming on Rolling Stone's website as well as Pandora Radio Premieres, on September 24, 2013.

== Track listing ==
1. The Truth - 4:26
2. Broken Heart - 3:37
3. Minding the Usher - 3:27
4. Distant Light - 3:24
5. Phenomenon - 3:55
6. Too Weak to Ramble - 3:57
7. Long Way Down - 3:52
8. Cuckoo - 4:05
9. Twilight - 3:35
10. Rock & Roll - 3:08
11. Love - 3:42
12. Nellie - 3:38

iTunes/Deluxe Download bonus tracks

1. Mt. Slippery - 1:48
2. Can't Remember - 3:54
3. Humble Passenger - 6:36

== Personnel ==
Dr. Dog

- Toby Leaman - vocals, bass, guitar
- Scott McMicken - vocals, guitar, bass, Casio, banjo, percussion, autoharp, samples
- Frank McElroy - guitar, vocals
- Zach Miller - keyboards, piano, vocals, air organ, guitar
- Eric Slick - drums, percussion, marimba, synth, saxophone, samples
- Dimitri Manos - percussion, marimba, drums, effects, samples, autoharp
