= Abandoned Mansion =

Studio album by Dr. Dog
- Released: November 29, 2016
- Recorded: Clifton Heights, PA
- Studio: Mt. Slippery
- Genre: Indie rock, blues rock, neo-psychedelia
- Length: 40:34
- Label: We Buy Gold Records
- Producer: Nathan Sabatino

Dr. Dog chronology
The Psychedelic Swamp (2016)	Abandoned Mansion (2016)	Critical Equation (2018)

Abandoned Mansion is the ninth studio album by psychedelic rock band Dr. Dog. It was released on November 29, 2016, and is the band's first on the We Buy Gold Records record label. The album was produced and engineered by Nathan Sabatino and recorded in 2014 in the band's Mt. Slippery studio in Clifton Heights, PA.

== Album information ==
On November 29, 2016, Dr. Dog dropped a surprise album on Bandcamp titled Abandoned Mansion. The album was made available to stream for free and all proceeds received through January 31, 2017 would benefit the Southern Poverty Law Center.

== Track listing ==
All tracks are written by Dr. Dog, except where noted

No.	Title	Length
1.	"Casual Freefall"	3:09
2.	"Ladada"	3:38
3.	"Jim Song"	5:23
4.	"Survive"	4:04
5.	"I Saw Her for the First Time"	4:18
6.	"Peace of Mind"	3:43
7.	"Could've Happened to Me"	3:01
8.	"Both Sides of The Line"	3:45
9.	"I Know"	4:15
10.	"Abandoned Mansion"	5:23
Total length:		40:34

== Personnel ==
Dr. Dog is:

- Toby Mark Leaman — vocals, bass
- Scott Anthony McMicken — vocals, guitar
- Zachery Ulrich Miller — keys
- Francis Xavier McElroy — guitar, vocals
- Eric James Marshall Slick — drums
- Dimitri Robert Manos — percussion, drums, guitar

Additional Musicians:

- Conner Gallaher—pedal steel on “Both Sides of the Line”
- String quartet Sarah Larsen (viola), Valerie Vuolo (violin), Kaveh Saidi (violin), John Thorell (cello) on “I Saw Her for the First Time”
- Arranged by: Sarah Larsen.
