= The EFFECTS =

American math rock band

- Origin: Washington, DC, United States
- Genres: Rock, math rock
- Years active: 2014–present
- Label: Dischord Records
- Members: Devin Ocampo; Matthew Dowling; David Rich
- Website: the-effects.com

The Effects (stylized as the EFFECTS) are a Washington, D.C.–based math rock band consisting of Devin Ocampo, Matthew Dowling, and David Rich. They have released four digital EPs and a full-length album, Eyes to the Light, on Dischord Records.

Formed in Washington, D.C. in 2014, the band's music takes inspiration from indie rock, post-hardcore, and progressive rock and has been described as providing an "updated take on the D.C. sound."

Ocampo is a former member of the Washington, D.C. groups Faraquet, Medications, Smart Went Crazy, and Deathfix. Additionally, he has toured and recorded with Beauty Pill, Mary Timony, and J. Robbins. Dowling was a member of D.C.-based indie rock band, Deleted Scenes and Rich performed in the band Buildings.

The trio's debut album was greeted with praise in Washington City Paper, Bandcamp Daily, and Post-Trash.

== Discography ==
Studio albums

- Eyes to the Light (Dischord Records, 2017)

Singles and EPs

- "Blister" b/w "Old Soul" (self-released, 2014)
- "Essentially Broken" b/w "The Clarity Of Open Spaces" (self-released, 2015)
- "Fix As The Reason" b/w "Close The Gap" (self-released, 2015)
