= Critical Equation =

Studio album by Dr. Dog
- Released: April 27, 2018
- Recorded: Fillipinotown, CA
- Studio: Sargent Recorders
- Genre: Indie rock, blues rock
- Length: 40:27
- Label: Thirty Tigers
- Producer: Gus Seyffert

Dr. Dog chronology
Abandoned Mansion (2016)	Critical Equation (2018)	Live 2 (2019)

Critical Equation is the tenth album by American psychedelic rock band Dr. Dog. It was released on April 27, 2018 on the Thirty Tigers label. The album was met with generally favorable reviews, reaching 68 on Metacritic.

== Production ==
After band member Dimitry Manos left the band for other projects and frustrations about how their previous label had handled the release of their previous two albums The Psychedelic Swamp and Abandoned Mansion, the band decided to change their recording process, recording exclusively on 16-track analog tape and worked with a new producer, Gus Seyffert, in a new studio, Sargent Recorders, in California in late 2017.

On NPR's Live from Here percussionist Eric Slick stated “We were either going to break up or make our best record" given the stress of the production process.

== Release ==
The album was made available for streaming on OPB's website on April 23, 2018, 4 days before it was released. Four tracks were also made available prior to the album's release: "Listening In" was released on January 15, "Go Out Fighting" on February 15, "Buzzing in the Light", on March 15, and "Heart Killer" on April 6.

== Track listing ==
All tracks are written by Dr. Dog.

No.	Title	Length
1.	"Listening In"	4:53
2.	"Go Out Fighting"	3:24
3.	"Buzzing in the Light"	4:02
4.	"Virginia Please"	4:02
5.	"Critical Equation"	3:59
6.	"True Love"	2:51
7.	"Heart Killer"	3:33
8.	"Night"	6:01
9.	"Under the Wheels"	3:50
10.	"Coming Out of the Darkness"	3:41
Total length:		40:27

== Personnel ==
Dr. Dog

- Toby Leaman – vocals, bass
- Scott McMicken – vocals, guitar
- Zach Miller – keys
- Frank McElroy – guitar, vocals
- Eric Slick – drums

Production

- Sean Cook – engineering
- Dave Cooley – mastering
- Leann Cornelius – artwork, design
- Dr. Dog – artwork, design
- Gus Seyffert – engineering, mixing, production
