= Toothbrush (album) =

Studio album by Dr. Dog
- Released: January 1, 2002
- Recorded: 2001
- Genre: Psychedelic rock, Indie rock
- Label: self-released

Dr. Dog chronology
Toothbrush (2002)	Easy Beat (2005)

Toothbrush is the first studio album by Dr. Dog. It was self-released in 2002 by Dr. Dog, although the official release date and record label is speculated. Little is known on the official release and mass distributions of the album.

Stylistically, the 60s pop roots of Dr. Dog's style are apparent, presented in a lo-fi quality for which they are renowned. The album is considered more of a debut than Psychedelic Swamp mainly due to its availability on the iTunes Music Store and major online music retailers, such as Amazon .

== Track listing ==
No.	Title	Length
1.	"I Can't Fly"	4:58
2.	"Mystery to Me"	5:13
3.	"How Dare"	2:42
4.	"Say Ahhh"	4:12
5.	"Jealous Man"	4:38
6.	"The ABCs"	4:40
7.	"Swamp Livin'"	4:41
8.	"Adeline"	3:19
9.	"County Line"	4:29
10.	"Heaven"	6:58

== Recording ==
Toothbrush being Dr. Dog's 1st official debut album is the closest to where they're accredited for their lo-fi descriptions of their sound. This album was a strong yet mostly rediscovered gem amongst the most hardcore fans. It is also the reason they are said to be compared to lo-fi pioneers like Pavement, Sebadoh and Guided by Voices. It also shows the bands talent of whole band member harmonies and the band 1st blending of 1990's indie rock pioneers with rarely or not as popularly known Beach Boys albums such as The Beach Boys Love You, Wild Honey (the Beach Boys white soul album), Smiley Smile, Sunflower & Friends. There also are hints of The Beatles, which become more acknowledged by "We All Belong" widely compared to The Beatles White Album along w/ being compared with the sounds of many rare and well known 60s & 70s classic rock bands & 90's indie rock acts. Toothbrush is the perfect preview into the modern day Dr. Dog. Also it belonged to no label upon its 2001/2002 release, it therefore can be speculated that it was 1st released on cd-r, recorded on 8 track and believed to 1st be handed out amongst their family and friends and sold at the bands local small venue Philly shows and among small East Coast venues touring up and down the East Coast and at various house shows.

== Personnel ==
Dr. Dog is:

- Scott "Taxi" McMicken: most of the instruments and vocals
- Toby "Tables" Leaman: the rest of the instruments and vocals
- Zach "Text" Miller: not on record
- Doug "Truck" O'Donnell: not on record
- Ted "Today" Mark: not on record
- All tracks written and recorded by: Dr. Dog

Additional Musicians:

- Artwork by: W. Ben Smith
