= Percy (novel) =

1969 novel by Raymond Hitchcock

- Author: Raymond Hitchcock
- Language: English
- Genre: Comedy
- Publisher: Ebury Publishing
- Publication date: 1969
- Publication place: United Kingdom
- Media type: Print
- Followed by: Percy's Progress

Percy is a 1969 comedy novel by the British writer Raymond Hitchcock. It recounts the story of a British man who has the world's first penis transplant, following an accident.

Hitchcock followed it with a 1972 sequel Percy's Progress.

== Adaptation ==
In 1971 it was made into a British film of the same title directed by Ralph Thomas and starring Hywel Bennett, Denholm Elliott, and Elke Sommer.

== Bibliography ==
- Goble, Alan. The Complete Index to Literary Sources in Film. Walter de Gruyter, 1999.
