= The Psychedelic Swamp =

Studio album by Dr. Dog
- Released: February 5, 2016
- Genres: Indie rock; blues rock; neo-psychedelia
- Length: 38:55
- Label: Anti-
- Producers: Dr. Dog; Nathan Sabatino

Dr. Dog chronology
B-Room (2013)	The Psychedelic Swamp (2016)	Abandoned Mansion (2016)

The Psychedelic Swamp is the eighth album by psychedelic rock band Dr. Dog. It was recorded in 2001 and intended to be their debut album, but was rehashed, reproduced, and eventually released on February 5, 2016. It is the band's fourth release on the Anti- record label, and is a revamped version of their unreleased debut LP. The album was produced and engineered by Nathan Sabatino.

== Release ==
The album was made available for streaming on NPR's website on January 27, 2016, 9 days before it was released. Two tracks were also made available prior to the album's release - "Badvertise" was released on November 6, 2015, followed with "Bring My Baby Back" on January 5, 2016.

== Reception ==
Professional ratings
Aggregate scores
Source	Rating
Metacritic	72/100
Review scores
Source	Rating
AllMusic	3.5/5 stars
The A.V. Club	A−
Consequence of Sound	C−
Drowned in Sound	7/10
Under the Radar	7/10 stars

The Psychedelic Swamp received positive reviews from critics. On Metacritic, the album holds a score of 72/100 based on 9 reviews, indicating "generally favorable reviews".

== Track listing ==
All tracks are written by Dr. Dog, except where noted

No.	Title	Length
1.	"Golden Hind" (Doug O'Donnell)	3:12
2.	"Dead Record Player"	3:31
3.	"Swampadelic Pop"	3:42
4.	"Bring My Baby Back"	3:48
5.	"Holes in My Back"	2:34
6.	"Fire on My Back"	2:37
7.	"Swamp Descent" (Doug O'Donnell)	1:28
8.	"Engineer Says"	4:09
9.	"In Love"	3:07
10.	"(swamp inflammation)"	0:42
11.	"Badvertise"	3:24
12.	"Good Grief"	2:59
13.	"Swamp Is On" (Dr. Dog & Doug O'Donnell)	3:42
Total length:		38:55

== Personnel ==
Dr. Dog

- Toby Leaman - bass, vocals, production, engineering
- Scott McMicken - guitar, vocals, production, engineering
- Doug O'Donnell - guitar, vocals, engineering
- Frank McElroy - guitar, vocals, production, engineering
- Zach Miller - keyboards, production, engineering
- Eric Slick - drums, production, engineering
- Dimitri Manos - percussion, Meatball's palace, production, engineering

Additional personnel

- Nathan Sabatino – production, engineering
- Brian Lucey – mastering
- Tom Beach – technical assistance
- Matt Saunders – artwork
- Mary McCool – backing vocals (4, 6, 8)
- Mel Krodman – backing vocals (4, 6, 8)
- Eppchez – backing vocals (4, 6, 8)
- Mr. Tidypaws – saxophone (8)
