= Raymond Hitchcock (author) =

English novelist, screenwriter, and cartoonist

Raymond John Hitchcock (9 February 1922 – 23 February 1992) was an English novelist, screenwriter, and cartoonist, He is best remembered for his novel Percy, which was the basis for a 1971 film of the same name. Several of his earlier books were light-hearted sexual farces; his later titles included several thrillers. He was the father of English musician Robyn Hitchcock.

Hitchcock was born in Calcutta, India in 1922 to English parents. At age 22, his right knee was hit by shrapnel during the Battle of Normandy, leaving him unable to bend it for the rest of his life. He spent 9 months in hospital recovering, and very nearly had to have the leg amputated.

He trained as an engineer, working in telecommunications, before abandoning this career to concentrate on creating cartoons. From there he drifted into writing, his first novel being successful enough to be turned into a film of the same title. Apart from writing novels, he wrote the screenplays of several short plays which appeared in such series as Play for Today and Thirty-Minute Theatre.

Hitchcock died of cancer in Winchester, England in 1992 shortly after his 70th birthday.

== Books ==
- Percy (1969)
- The Gilt Edged Boy (1971)
- Percy's Progress (1972)
- There's a Girl in My Soup (1972) (novelisation of the film of the same name;)
- Venus 13: A Cautionary Space Tale (1972)
- Attack the Lusitania! (1979) (later retitled The Lusitania Plot)
- The Canaris Legacy (1980)
- Sea Wrack (1982)
- Archangel 006 (1983)
- The Tunnellers (1986)
- Checkmate Budapest (1988)
- Fighting Cancer: A Personal Story (1989) (memoir)
