= Percy (1971 film) =

1971 British comedy film directed by Ralph Thomas

- DVD Cover
- Directed by: Ralph Thomas
- Written by: Hugh Leonard; Michael Palin; Terence Feely
- Based on: Percy by Raymond Hitchcock
- Produced by: Betty E. Box; Nat Cohen
- Starring: Hywel Bennett; Denholm Elliott; Elke Sommer; Britt Ekland; Cyd Hayman
- Cinematography: Ernest Steward
- Edited by: Roy Watts
- Music by: Ray Davies
- Production company: Welbeck Films
- Distributed by: Anglo-EMI Film Distributors
- Release date: 11 February 1971
- Running time: 103 minutes
- Country: United Kingdom
- Language: English
- Budget: £300,000

Percy is a 1971 British comedy film directed by Ralph Thomas starring Hywel Bennett, Denholm Elliott, Elke Sommer and Britt Ekland.

The film is based on the 1969 novel of the same name by Raymond Hitchcock, and features a soundtrack by The Kinks. It was followed by a 1974 sequel, Percy's Progress.

== Plot ==
Edwin Anthony is an innocent and shy young man who is hit by a nude man falling from a high-rise building while carrying a chandelier. Edwin's penis is mutilated in the accident and has to be amputated; the falling man is killed.

Edwin becomes the recipient of the world's first penis transplant: he receives the very large penis of the womanizer killed in the same accident. With his new bit of anatomy (which he names "Percy"), Edwin follows the womanizer's footsteps, meeting all his women friends, before settling happily with the donor's mistreated widow.

== Cast ==
- Hywel Bennett as Edwin Anthony
- Denholm Elliott as Emmanuel Whitbread
- Elke Sommer as Helga
- Britt Ekland as Dorothy Chiltern-Barlow
- Cyd Hayman as Moira Warrington
- Janet Key as Hazel Anthony
- Tracey Crisp as Miss Elder
- Antonia Ellis as Rita La Rousse
- Tracy Reed as Mrs. Penney
- Patrick Mower as James Vaile
- Pauline Delaney as Sister Flanagan
- Adrienne Posta as Maggie Hyde
- Julia Foster as Marilyn
- Sheila Steafel as Mrs. Gold
- Arthur English as Pub Comic
- Angus MacKay as TV producer
- Rita Webb as Mrs. Hedges
- Charles Hodgson as TV interviewer
- Sue Lloyd as Bernice
- Denise Coffey as Operator #1
- Edward Malin as Elderly patient
- Margaretta Scott as Rita's Mother
- Graham Crowden as Alfred Spaulton
- T. P. McKenna as Meet the People Compere
- Tony Haygarth as Purdey
- Jane Carr as Nurse
- Ronnie Brody as Reporter
- Penny Brahms as Football Spectator
- George Best as himself

== Production ==
Producer Betty E. Box discovered the novel when she and director Ralph Thomas were meeting a publisher about optioning the film rights for another book. They were not available at the time, but the publisher gave them a manuscript by Raymond Hitchcock about a penis transplant. Box took it back to the office to read. "I zipped through it, laughing aloud as I read", she wrote. "Very unusual. I might sometimes smile at a book, but I hadn't laughed like this since I read Richard Gordon's Doctor in the House."

Ralph Thomas enjoyed the book too so they decided to option the rights. These ended up costing four times more than Box originally thought after Hitchcock had his own agent, as opposed to the publisher, do the negotiations. Box and Thomas paid for the rights themselves "not without a fair amount of heart-searching", Box wrote, "as we didn't expect it to be a straightforward financing operation – with the amount required to make a film it seldom is – but this was certainly not a subject I expected Rank, our traditional partners, to finance. They very soon turned it down without even reading it."

In June 1969 it was announced Box had bought the rights for £30,000 (the novel was not published until November). "I know people are saying this is the film that cannot be made," said Box. "But we have already thrashed out a makeshift formula... It will be a comedy film with sex, not a sex film... We are only dealing with something that every man has." "This is a tale of exploration," said Ralph Thomas.

Finance was obtained from Nat Cohen at EMI Films - they provided the entire budget. The poster was designed by John Troke, a publicist who had introduced Box to the book of Doctor in the House 15 years earlier. A script was prepared by Hugh Leonard while Thomas and Box filmed Doctor in Trouble.

"Five years ago I doubt we could have gotten away with it," said Box. "But today it is time we made the human male organ a subject for open, straightforward conversation. I mean, really it is a thing that has been sacred too long."

The script was rewritten by Michael Palin and Terry Jones. They met with Thomas and Box at Pinewood in May 1970 and rewrote the script that month.

The film was shot in June 1970 being finished by September. It took place at Elstree Studios and on location in London. The film's sets were designed by the art director Robert Jones. Ray Davies of The Kinks wrote the film's soundtrack Percy.

"I realise this is an adult film," said Box, "but I do insist that it is not a sexy one."

During the making of the film, another comedy about a penis was being shot, The Statue. Box always regarded this as a rip off.

Box says that Raymond Hitchcock was delighted with the film and thought Hywel Bennett was very close to his original James Anthony.

Thomas and Box agreed to make a sequel provided Nat Cohen finance a film they wanted to make about the Byron-Shelley story, The Reckless Years. However Cohen reneged on the deal and only made the sequel.

== Soundtrack ==
A 1971 film soundtrack album, Percy, was performed by the English rock group the Kinks with additional orchestral arrangements conducted by Stanley Myers. It was released as the band's ninth official studio album. The songs were written by Ray Davies and include both standard rock/pop songs and instrumental numbers.

== Release ==
The film was not screened in Australia until the "R" certificate was introduced.

== Reception ==
=== Critical ===
The Monthly Film Bulletin wrote: "The advertising campaign which paved the way for Percy by inviting us to guess its length seemed reprehensible enough but was still inadequate preparation for the unadulterated salacity of the film itself. Edwin's first waking vision of the Post Office Tower sets the tone for a fusillade of barrack-room humour that repeats and twists practically every joke ever made about male genitalia, then caps this by having comedian Arthur English stand up and recite what would appear to be an anthology of the gags that didn't make the grade for the scenario. Depressing enough when it forms the mainstay of the hospital situation comedy, this monotonous level of wit becomes still more wearying as an attempt to enliven Edwin's apparently pointless quest for his donor. Director Ralph Thomas never misses an opportunity to leer at an undraped statue or the phallic objects that litter the sets and tower from the hoardings, though he does find time to make reproving digs at the amorality of television and the tabloid press. In the face of such banality, accomplished performers like Denholm Elliott and Adrienne Posta just fall by the wayside, although Cyd Hayman as the melancholy widow manages to make the best of things."

=== Box office ===
Percy was the 8th most popular film at the British box office in 1971. By June 1972, it had earned EMI a profit of £43,000. Eventually, according to Nat Cohen, it made a profit of £500,000.
