= Scott McMicken =

American musician

- McMicken in 2018

Background information
- Born: Scott Anthony McMicken
- Genres: Indie rock; psychedelic rock; lo-fi; folk rock; psychedelic pop
- Occupations: Musician; singer; songwriter; record producer
- Instruments: Vocals; guitar; bass; keyboards
- Years active: 1999–present
- Labels: Park the Van; Anti-; Thirty Tigers
- Member of: Dr. Dog; Scott McMicken & the Ever-Expanding; The Hypos
- Formerly of: Raccoon; Unleash The Bastards

Scott Anthony McMicken is an American singer, songwriter, guitarist, and record producer. He is best known as the co-founder, co-lead vocalist, and guitarist of the Philadelphia based-rock band Dr. Dog, a collaboration that began in his teenage years with Toby Leaman in Delaware.

McMicken also launched the side project Scott McMicken and The Ever-Expanding, and releasing their debut album Shabang (2023). He also formed the home-recorded duo The Hypos with Greg Cartwright.

== Biography ==
=== Early career ===
Scott Anthony McMicken was raised in Newark, Delaware. His musical partnership with co-frontman Toby Leaman began when the two met in the eighth grade at the age of 14. They focused exclusively on writing and recording their own material from the outset, with McMicken citing "recording music as his primary creative obsession" since the age of twelve.

The duo attended West Chester University in West Chester, Pennsylvania, where the project evolved from their earlier band Raccoon into the formal lineup of Dr. Dog.

=== Dr. Dog ===
McMicken performing with Dr. Dog in 2016

McMicken has served as a co-frontman, lead guitarist, and primary songwriter for Dr. Dog in 1999, splitting the songwriting and lead vocal duties with Toby Leaman. Their contrasting writing styles are considered essential to the band's balance.

In the band's initial phase, McMicken was instrumental in establishing their signature "lo-fi" and "experimental" recording style on their self-released albums, including the original recordings of The Psychedelic Swamp (2001; later released in 2016) and Toothbrush (2002). The album started as a home-recorded tape made by McMicken, Leaman, and Doug O'Donald, exploring patchy psychedelic sounds and a story about a man sending a message through music, a concept the band later returned to when making the album version. The band's breakthrough came with their first official release, Easy Beat (2005), which gained them national attention after an invitation to tour with My Morning Jacket. According to Pitchfork, the album carried many of the loose and unpolished traits that could make their live shows feel either endearing or frustrating, including enthusiastic interband calls, uneven playing, and moments that did not always connect with audiences.

Over the following years, McMicken continued to contribute heavily as a writer and vocalist across subsequent albums, including We All Belong (2007) and Fate (2008). He guided the evolution of their sound on albums like Shame, Shame (2010), which he described as having a more modern, punk rock feel to better reflect the band's live show. This was followed by Be the Void (2012), which featured his prominent single, "That Old Black Hole". His commitment to self-sufficiency led him to be a key figure in the band's decision to construct their own recording facility, nicknamed "Mount Slippery", where B-Room (2013) was recorded.

The band later re-released a re-recorded version of The Psychedelic Swamp (2016), followed by the surprise release of Abandoned Mansion (2016) and their album Critical Equation (2018), which was produced by Brad Cook. According to McMicken, the album Critical Mansion has been noted for its sound reminiscent of early 1970s R&B bands stretching out, plugging in, and experimenting with extended grooves. In 2024, McMicken took on the role of producer for the band's final self-titled album, which he stated had an intentionally loose and live recording process influenced by his solo work.

=== Solo career and side projects ===
In 2012, McMicken with fellow member Eric Slick took part in The Complete Last Waltz at the Warfield Theatre in San Francisco, a three-and-a-half-hour tribute to the Band's 1976 swan song. The event featured all 41 songs from the original concert, with special guests performing iconic parts. McMicken contributed by invoking Bob Dylan on "Forever Young", alongside other highlights from artists covering Dr. John and Van Morrison.

Following Dr. Dog's announcement of their retirement from touring in 2021, McMicken concentrated on solo projects. He formed Scott McMicken and The Ever-Expanding, releasing the debut album Shabang (2023) on ANTI- Records, which features 13 songs. McMicken described the recording as a deeply engaging experience: "Such an incredible spectrum of emotion passed through me while making this album. There was this lightness and un-self seriousness. I feel like music and life cruises at that spot: everybody was so wholeheartedly invested and open." McMicken also maintains a side project called The Hypos with Asheville-based artist Greg Cartwright, which focuses on a raw, minimalist, home-recorded aesthetic.

In 2023, McMicken featured on singer-songwriter M. Ward's single "New Kerrang". Along with McMicken, M. Ward also included contributions from Jim James of My Morning Jacket, First Aid Kit, Shovels & Rope, Neko Case, and other guest artists on the album Supernatural Thing.

== Equipment ==
McMicken in 2016

McMicken plays a variety of guitars, often favoring older or modified instruments. He has used rubber-bridge acoustics built by Reuben Cox, a Partscaster Telecaster assembled from different components, a 1980s Fender Stratocaster, and an Oahu acoustic. His amplifiers include a 1965 Fender Princeton and a 1967 Fender Champ.

For effects, he has used pedals such as the ZVEX Super Duper 2-In-1, Strymon Deco, and Electro-Harmonix Micro Synth, though he has recently reduced his use of delay. He often tunes his guitars down to C♯ standard, uses heavy picks, and plays with .013 gauge strings, including flatwounds on the rubber-bridge baritone.

== Discography ==
=== Solo album ===
- IT (2015)
- In Your Dreams (2017)
- Original Love (2020)

=== With Dr. Dog ===
- The Psychedelic Swamp (original recordings, 2001; re-recorded and released 2016)
- Toothbrush (2002)
- Easy Beat (2005)
- We All Belong (2007)
- Fate (2008)
- Shame, Shame (2010)
- Be the Void (2012)
- B-Room (2013)
- Abandoned Mansion (2016)
- Critical Equation (2018)
- Dr. Dog (2024)

=== With Scott McMicken and The Ever-Expanding ===
- Shabang (2023)
- When It's Happening (2024)
- New Purple Dress (2025)

=== With The Hypos ===
- The Hypos (2025)

=== Collaborations ===
- New Kerrang (2023) with M. Ward
