= Eric Slick =

American singer, songwriter and drummer (born 1987)

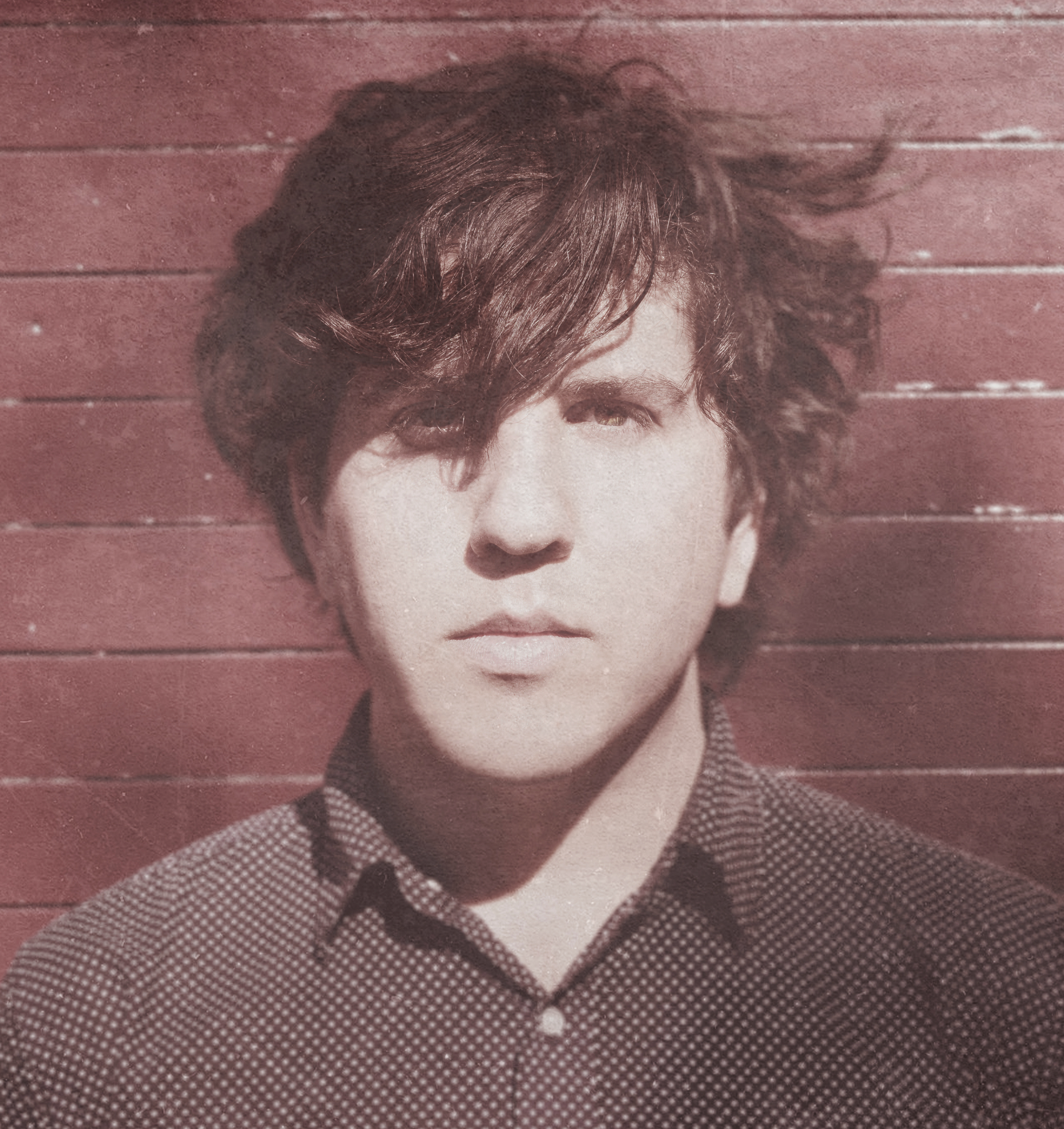
- Slick in 2012

Background information
- Born: Eric James Marshall Slick; May 15, 1987 (age 39)
- Origin: Philadelphia, Pennsylvania, United States
- Genres: Indie rock
- Occupations: Musician, songwriter, singer
- Instruments: Drums, vocals
- Years active: 2010–present
- Website: www.ericslick.com

Eric James Marshall Slick (born May 15, 1987) is an American singer, songwriter and drummer. He is the drummer of Dr. Dog, performing on their albums Shame, Shame (2010), Be The Void (2012), B-Room (2013), The Psychedelic Swamp (2016) Abandoned Mansion (2016). and Critical Equation (2018). Slick released his debut solo album Palisades on April 21, 2017, to positive reviews from Consequence of Sound, Relix and Tidal, in which Greg Saunier of Deerhoof rated the album "10 out of 10 stars."

== Early life ==
Slick is a native of Philadelphia, Pennsylvania and began playing drums at age 5. As a teenager, he was a student of the original Paul Green School of Rock Music, and appeared with his sister Julie Slick in the 2005 documentary Rock School.

== Career ==
Aside from Dr. Dog and solo records, Slick has also performed/recorded with Adrian Belew, Nels Cline (Wilco), Daniel Rossen (Grizzly Bear), R. Stevie Moore, Cass McCombs, Ween, and Ruston Kelly; he played drums on the 2021 Taylor Swift track “You All Over Me”, produced by Aaron Dessner.

Slick also operates a vinyl label, Least Records.

On June 24, 2019, Eric Slick took to Twitter to announce his marriage to fellow musician, Natalie Prass. They later collaborated in 2020 on Slick's solo album, Wiseacre (2020) with the feature track, Closer to Heaven.

In 2022, Slick played drums on The Simple Plan EP by August is Falling, a pop-punk, emo-style music project.

In 2026, Slick played drums on the Robyn Hitchcock album, The Confuser.

== Discography ==
=== As solo artist ===
- Out of Habit (2014)
- Four Track Demos Vol. 1 and 2 (2015)
- Palisades (2017)
- Bullfighter EP (2018)
- Wiseacre (2020)
- New Age Rage (2024)

=== With The Adrian Belew Power Trio ===
- Side Four (2007)
- e (2009)

=== With Lithuania ===
- Heavy Hands (2010)
- Hardcore Friends (2015)
- White Reindeer (2017)

=== With August Is Falling ===
- The Simple Plan EP (2022)
