= Dr. Dog =

American rock band

- Dr. Dog in 2018

Background information
- Origin: Philadelphia, Pennsylvania, U.S.
- Genres: Indie rock, psychedelic rock, baroque pop, indie folk, Americana, neo-psychedelia, lo-fi (earlier years)
- Years active: 1999–present
- Labels: Park the Van Records; Anti-; Thirty Tigers
- Members: Scott McMicken; Toby Leaman; Zach Miller; Eric Slick; Frank McElroy; Michael Libramento
- Past members: Dimitri Manos; Doug O'Donnell; Ted Mark; Kyle Staska; Andrew Jones; Juston Stens; Griffin Forberg
- Website: drdogmusic.com

Dr. Dog is an American rock band based in Philadelphia. Its lineup consists of Toby Leaman (bass), Scott McMicken (lead guitar), Frank McElroy (rhythm guitar), Zach Miller (keyboard), Eric Slick (drums), and Michael Libramento (percussion, lap steel, acoustic guitar, bass). Lead vocal duties are shared between Leaman and McMicken, and all members contribute harmonies. In addition, each band member has a nickname beginning with the letter T and they have explained that friends of the band also receive nicknames, which are drawn from aspects of their lives and personalities. (Former member Andrew "Trial" Jones, for example, is a licensed attorney.)

The band's musical styling of indie rock is strongly influenced by bands of the 1960s and 1970s, such as the Beatles, the Beach Boys, and Big Star, but they have also touched upon more unrelated genres since their inception. Their earlier recordings show influence of the lo-fi sound and pop sensibilities of indie rock bands of the 1990s, including Sonic Youth, Guided by Voices, and Pavement, although recent albums have featured more polished production.

== History ==
=== Origins ===
The origins of Dr. Dog trace back to Toby Mark Leaman and Scott Anthony McMicken first playing music together in eighth grade. The two never played covers, instead opting to write all of their own music. The band began as an offshoot of Leaman's and McMicken's earlier music project, during college at West Chester University in West Chester, Pennsylvania, called Raccoon. Dr. Dog formed with the addition of keyboardist Zachery Ulrich Miller, drummer Ted Mark, and guitarist Douglas O'Donnell also while attending West Chester. Their early recordings were experimental and recorded on eight track. They self-recorded and self-released their first album The Psychedelic Swamp in 2001. Beginning in 2002, Leaman, McMicken, and O'Donnell regularly played bluegrass with friends at the London Grill in the Fairmount Section of Philadelphia under the pseudonym "Conowingo Homeboys". Meanwhile, Leaman and O'Donnell split time in both Dr. Dog and another band, Doublehorse! They released Toothbrush in 2002. Mark left the band in 2003 and O'Donnell left in 2004. Juston Stens replaced Ted Mark on drums. The band was mostly in Philadelphia during their early years, where they developed a small but dedicated fanbase touring with other local bands such as The Teeth.

In 2004, My Morning Jacket invited them on two tours after a copy of Toothbrush was given to Jim James after a My Morning Jacket show. Soon after, The New York Times music critic Kelefa Sanneh praised the group's album Easy Beat in a December 2004 article, leading to attention from other critics. They signed with Park The Van Records, who released the album Easy Beat, and completed their first cross-country tour in 2005. A music video was released for the song "Fool's Life". In late 2005 Jones, who became a full-time lawyer, left. Jones was replaced by Francis Xavier McElroy, a friend of Stens from New Jersey. The band continued to tour heavily as their popularity grew, due in part to their use of the internet to promote their growing catalog.

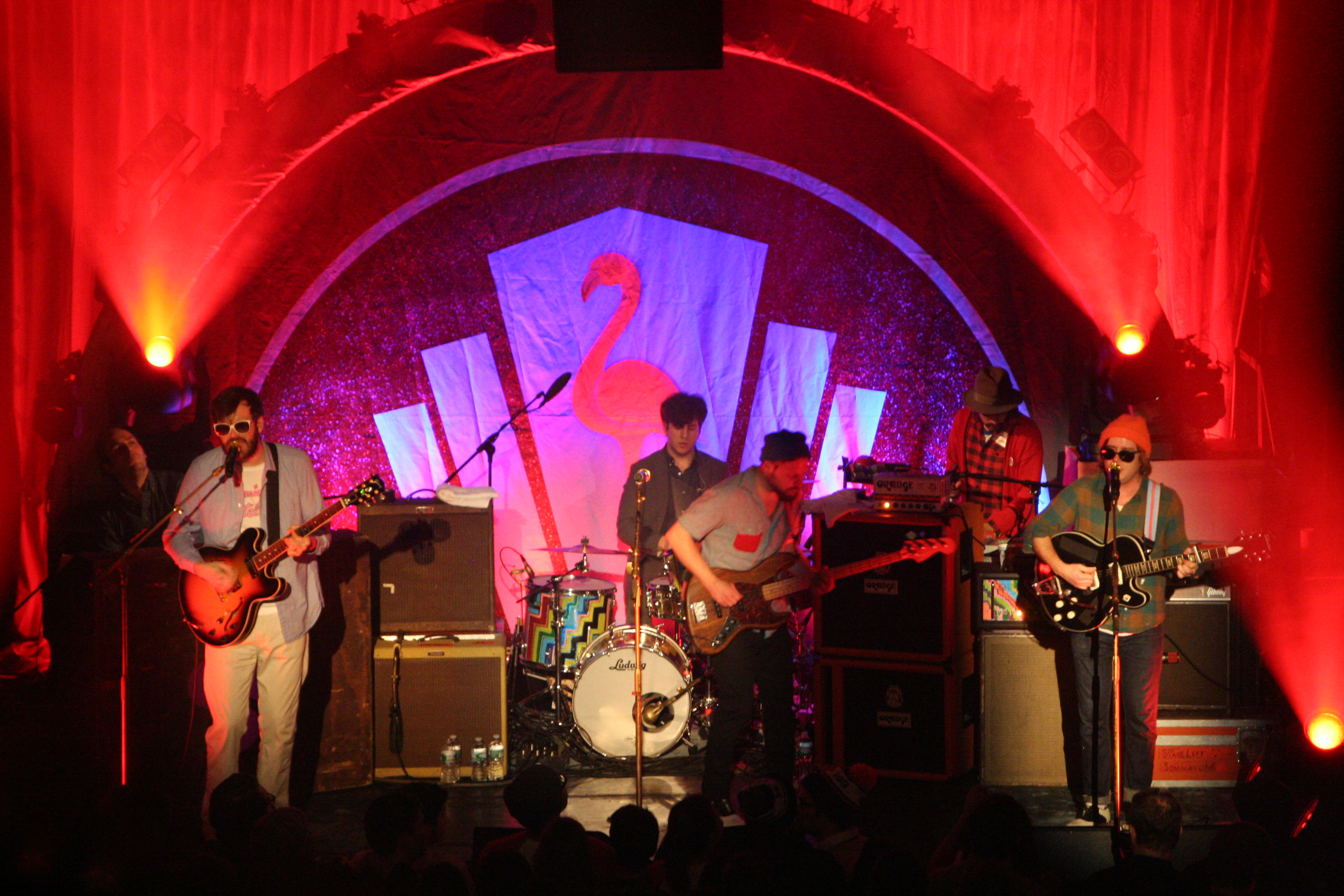
Dr. Dog performing at Bowery Ballroom in Manhattan, New York, February 2015

=== With Park the Van (2006–2009) ===
By 2006, Dr. Dog started using a new studio as well as new recording equipment. Philadelphia engineer/producer Bill Moriarty, who they share the studio with, is credited in helping the members use this new equipment to create particular sounds they wanted in their new recordings due to his vast knowledge in recording tools and methods. That year, they released the Takers and Leavers EP. Two of the tracks on the EP would later be released on their next album. In 2007, they released We All Belong, which has a markedly cleaner production compared to earlier albums. They appeared on the Late Show with David Letterman in support of the album.

Through the late summer of 2007, Dr. Dog streamed ten unreleased tracks on their website, with a new song debuting weekly. Songs were posted each Monday from July 2 until September 3. The recordings were later released as an album titled Passed Away, Vol. 1. In 2008, the band released Fate. They appeared again on Late Night with Conan O'Brien on July 17, 2008, in support of the album and on Late Night with Jimmy Fallon on April 2, 2009, as well as The Late Late Show with Craig Ferguson. The band then toured with The Cave Singers, a Seattle indie band, and label-mates Golden Boots.

=== With Anti- (2009–2016) ===
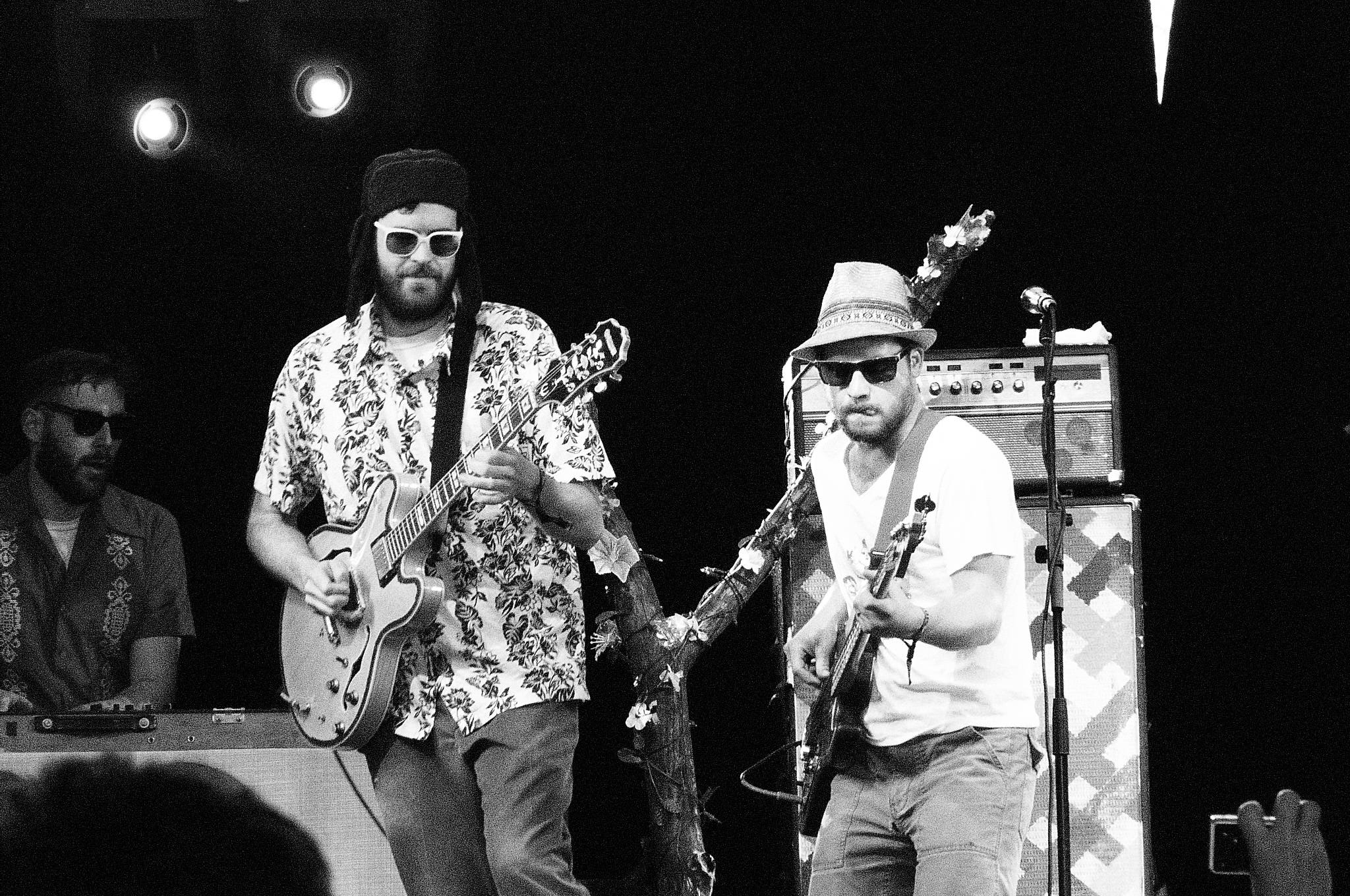
Dr. Dog performs at Coachella 2009

On July 29, 2009, Dr. Dog signed to Anti- Records. The first album on their new label, titled Shame, Shame, was released on April 6, 2010. Scott McMicken characterized the album as more modern, and a little more punk rock, more prominently featuring electric guitars, so as to accurately reflect the band's live show. In early 2010, Eric James Marshall Slick replaced Juston Stens on drums for the Shame, Shame tours although Stens plays most of the drums on the record. Stens continues to make music with Juston Stens and the Get Real Gang. Dr. Dog toured in support of Shame, Shame for about two years and performed again on The Late Late Show with Craig Ferguson. For 2010's Black Friday Record Store Day, the band released a limited red and blue 7" collection of four tracks recorded in summer 2011. These were the first songs recorded with Slick on drums. They were later rereleased with Shame, Shame as a deluxe edition of the album.

On October 26, 2011, McMicken announced that their new album, Be the Void would be released in February 2012. Recorded at the band's "Meth Beach" studio and co-produced by Nathan Sabatino of Golden Boots. This was the first full album made with Dimitri Robert Manos, also in the band Golden Boots, as an official member of the band. He played drums on Easy Beat and once filled in for Juston Stens last minute for a whole tour. They released a new 7" on a variety of colors for the November 2011 Record Store Day including the tracks "Warrior Man" and "Control Yourself" which would appear on Be The Void. On January 31, 2012, Be The Void was first available to be streamed on Conan O'Brien's website one week before its official release. It was officially released on February 7 on ANTI- Records. They performed the song "That Old Black Hole" on Conan, February 8 and "Lonesome" on Late Night with Jimmy Fallon, on March 23. Performances in Los Angeles' Orpheum Theatre during their tour were also shown on Last Call with Carson Daly. On September 27, 2012, Dr. Dog announced on their Facebook page that their new EP, Wild Race, would be released digitally on October 2. The EP was recorded and mixed with Nathan Sabatino during the sessions for Be the Void.

On July 22, 2013, the band announced their next album, B-Room and the lead single "The Truth". To record the album the band built an all-new studio in February 2013 in Clifton Heights, Pennsylvania nicknamed "Mount Slippery. All songs were tracked live in the room which eventually led to the album's name. B-Room was released on October 1, 2013, after streaming for free for one week on Rolling Stone's website. The album received generally positive reviews. Dr. Dog's first live album, Live at a Flamingo Hotel became available of January 13, 2015. The album was assembled from performances over 20 concerts during the B-Room tour.

In September 2015, Leaman revealed that the band has revisited 2001's Psychedelic Swamp, and the album would finally get an official release in 2016. He told Kelly Rae Smith of the Charleston City Paper, "It's actually weird working on that stuff, because you know usually when you're working on a record—or almost always when you're working on a record—you're working on new tunes. And with this one, we're working on the oldest Dr. Dog tunes around. It's really interesting. You're almost treating your own songs like they're cover songs, and it's songs that we didn't even really play live, so we didn't have any real concept of what the arrangement would end up being like." The album The Psychedelic Swamp was released on February 5, 2016, on the Anti- label and was produced by Nathan Sabatino.

=== Abandoned Mansion and Critical Equation (2016–2020) ===
On November 29, 2016, Dr. Dog dropped a surprise album on Bandcamp titled Abandoned Mansion. The album was made available to stream for free and all proceeds received through January 31, 2017, would benefit the Southern Poverty Law Center. The album was released on the band's new label We Buy Gold Records as they previously ended their relationship with Anti- over the priorities of Abandoned Mansion against Psychedelic Swamp. The band did not tour in support of Mansion and took a brief hiatus.

On January 3, 2018, the band teased their new album titled Critical Equation on their website and on Twitter. The album was officially announced for an April 27, 2018, release on We Buy Gold via Thirty Tigers. Press and reviews for Critical Equation was generally positive. On February 8, 2019, the band released Critical 7" featuring two songs from the Critical Equation sessions. In October 2019 the band announced a 15-city winter 2020 tour which concluded in late February 2020 before the COVID-19 pandemic in the United States disrupted the live music business.

=== End of touring and Dr. Dog (2021–present) ===
On January 29, 2021, the band made their 2019 Record Store Day album Live 2 available for streaming and digital purchase. On June 7, 2021, the band announced they were retiring from touring but were not disbanding and would perform one final tour in autumn 2021 across 31 cities in North America, concluding with a five-night residency in their hometown of Philadelphia.

On September 14, 2022, the band announced their February 2020 residency at The Independent, a club in San Francisco would be released monthly as four live albums, titled Four Nights Live in San Francisco, from September 14 to December 5. In the email newsletter announcement they said that each individual member of the band is pursuing solo work but they planned to record new music together as Dr. Dog in 2023.

On March 20, 2024, the band released the single "Still Can't Believe" on streaming services. On April 24 they released the single "Talk Is Cheap," as well as announcing their self titled album to be released July 19. On May 15, the band released the single "Tell Your Friends" on streaming services. On July 19, 2024, they released their self-titled, eleventh studio album.

== Members ==
=== Current members ===
- Toby Leaman – vocals, bass, guitar (1999–present)
- Scott McMicken – vocals, lead guitar, bass, piano, banjo, keyboards, Omnichord (1999–present)
- Zach Miller – keyboards, piano, organ, guitar, banjo, backing vocals, accordion (1999–present)
- Frank McElroy – rhythm guitar, backing vocals, keyboards, Omnichord (2005–present)
- Eric Slick – drums, percussion, backing vocals, guitar (2010–present)
- Michael Libramento – percussion, lap steel, acoustic guitar, bass, backing vocals (c. 2019–present)

=== Former members ===
- Ted Mark – drums, percussion, backing vocals (1999–2003)
- Doug O'Donnell – guitar, backing vocals (1999–2004)
- Juston Stens – drums, percussion, backing vocals, guitar, bass (2003–2010)
- Andrew Jones – guitar, backing vocals (2004–2005)
- Dimitri Manos – percussion, electronics, effects, guitar, Meatball Palace, bass, Omnichord, Optigan, drums (2011–2017; touring member 2010–2011)

== Discography ==
=== Studio albums ===
Title	Album details	Peak chart positions	
Title	Album details	US	US Indie
Toothbrush	Released: January 1, 2002; Label: Self-released	—	—
Easy Beat	Released: March 15, 2005; Label: Park the Van Records	—	—
We All Belong	Released: February 27, 2007; Label: Park the Van	—	—
Fate	Released: July 22, 2008; Label: Park the Van	86	12
Shame, Shame	Released: April 6, 2010; Label: Anti-	44	6
Be the Void	Released: February 7, 2012; Label: Anti-	45	6
B-Room	Released: October 1, 2013; Label: Anti-	50	7
The Psychedelic Swamp	Released: February 5, 2016; Label: Anti-	172	8
Abandoned Mansion	Released: November 29, 2016; Label: We Buy Gold Records	—	—
Critical Equation	Released: April 27, 2018; Label: We Buy Gold	91	4
Dr. Dog	Released: July 19, 2024; Label: We Buy Gold	—	—
"—" denotes album that did not chart or was not released

=== Live albums ===
- Live at a Flamingo Hotel (January 13, 2015)
- Live 2 (April 13, 2019)
- Four Nights Live in San Francisco: Night 1 (September 14, 2022)
- Four Nights Live in San Francisco: Night 2 (October 10, 2022)
- Four Nights Live in San Francisco: Night 3 (November 7, 2022)
- Four Nights Live in San Francisco: Night 4 (December 5, 2022)

=== EPs ===
- Takers and Leavers (2006)
- Wild Race (2012)
- Live @ Google (2012)
- Oh My Christmas Tree (2013)
- Oh My Christmas Tree Volume 2 (2019)

=== Compilations ===
- Passed Away, Vol. 1 (2008)
- 10 Dr. Dog songs, for you (Promotional)
- Twistable Turnable Man: A Musical Tribute to Shel Silverstein (2010)

=== 7" vinyl ===
- "Al Thomas and the Robot" (by the M's)/"Me and My Girl" (2006)
- "Goner"/"I Hope There's Love" (2006)
- "The Girl"/"Heart It Races" (Architecture in Helsinki cover) (2007)
- "The Dearly Departed"/"Is It Worth My Time?" (2008)
- "The Breeze (performed by Floating Action)"/"Don't Stop Loving Me Now (performed by Dr. Dog)" (2009)
- "Take Me into Town"/"Black-Red and Nobody Knows Who You Are"/"The Sound" (2010)
- "Control Yourself/Warrior Man" (2011)
- "Can She Dance"/"Can't Catch Me" (2019)

== Other appearances ==
- Since early 2015, "Warrior Man" has been the entrance theme for Matt Sydal in the wrestling promotion, Ring Of Honor.
- Their song "My Old Ways" is featured in the full season 4 trailer of Fear the Walking Dead, which first aired on March 25, 2018.
- Their song "We All Belong" is featured in season 5 episode 22 of How I Met Your Mother.
- The song "Exit for Sale" is featured in season 1 episode 16 of Elementary.
- The song "What a Fool" appears in season 2 episode 10 of New Girl.
- The song "Phenomenon" appears in season 5 episode 19 of Parenthood.
- The song "Warrior Man" appears in season 6 episode 9 of Californication.
- The song "Black-Red" appeared in an episode of House of Cards.
- Their song "Where'd All the Time Go" was featured in the second season of Outer Banks.
- The song "Jackie Wants a Black Eye" appeared in season three of Eastbound & Down.
