= Park the Van =

American record label

Park the Van Records
- Founded: 2004
- Founder: Christopher Watson
- Genre: Indie rock
- Country of origin: U.S.
- Location: New Orleans and Sacramento, California
- Official website: parkthevan.com

Park the Van Records was an American record label and management company from New Orleans which was formed in 2004 by Christopher Watson to release music by the band, Dr. Dog. After Hurricane Katrina, the office was moved to Schwenksville, Pennsylvania southeast of Reading, and back to New Orleans in 2008, where the label discovered and signed the indie pop duo Generationals from New Orleans.

In late 2010 the label expanded services to represent independent musicians as managers, adding artists including Broncho, Scott H. Biram, and Pigeon John. In 2012 Watson left Park the Van and the label was run by Zach Fischel, Jeff Olson, and Corey Watson in Santa Monica, California. In 2017, Chris Watson returned to Park The Van, alongside Zach Fischel, Olson, and Phil Jones. The offices were split between Sacramento, Long Beach, California and London. The company dissolved in 2023.

== Label roster ==
- Best Move
- Boyo
- BRONCHO
- Capitol Years
- Carter Tanton
- Cayucas
- Chief Cleoptra
- Deleted Scenes, an art rock band from Washington, D.C.
- Drew Citron
- Drugs
- Dr. Dog
- Dustin Lovelis
- Frank Jordan
- The High Strung
- Eagle Winged Palace
- Emily Edrosa
- Empress Hotel
- Floating Action
- Generationals
- Giant Cloud
- Golden Boots
- Honyock
- Imaginary Tricks
- Johnny Aries
- Lampland
- Mae Powell
- Mediocre Cafe
- minihorse
- Nari
- National Eye
- Native America
- Neighbor Lady
- Night Palace
- Nik Freitas
- Oh, Rose
- Okey Dokey
- The Peekers
- Pepi Ginsberg
- Petite Amie
- Mae Powell
- R. Stevie Moore
- Seth Kauffman
- Spencer Hoffman
- Steven Bamidele
- The Magic Numbers
- The Spinto Band
- The Teeth
- Tino Drima
- Tulsa

== Management roster ==
- Dreamgirl
- Caregiver
- Pigeon John
- The Magic Numbers, an alternative rock band from West London, England
- La Luz
- Yumi Zouma from Christchurch, New Zealand
- So Much Light
- Hot Flash Heat Wave
- Yeasayer
- Anand Wilder
- Tino Drima
- Ailbhe Reddy
- Nia Wyn
- Steven Bamidele

== See also ==
- List of record labels
